= Rob Tapert =

American film producer (born 1955)

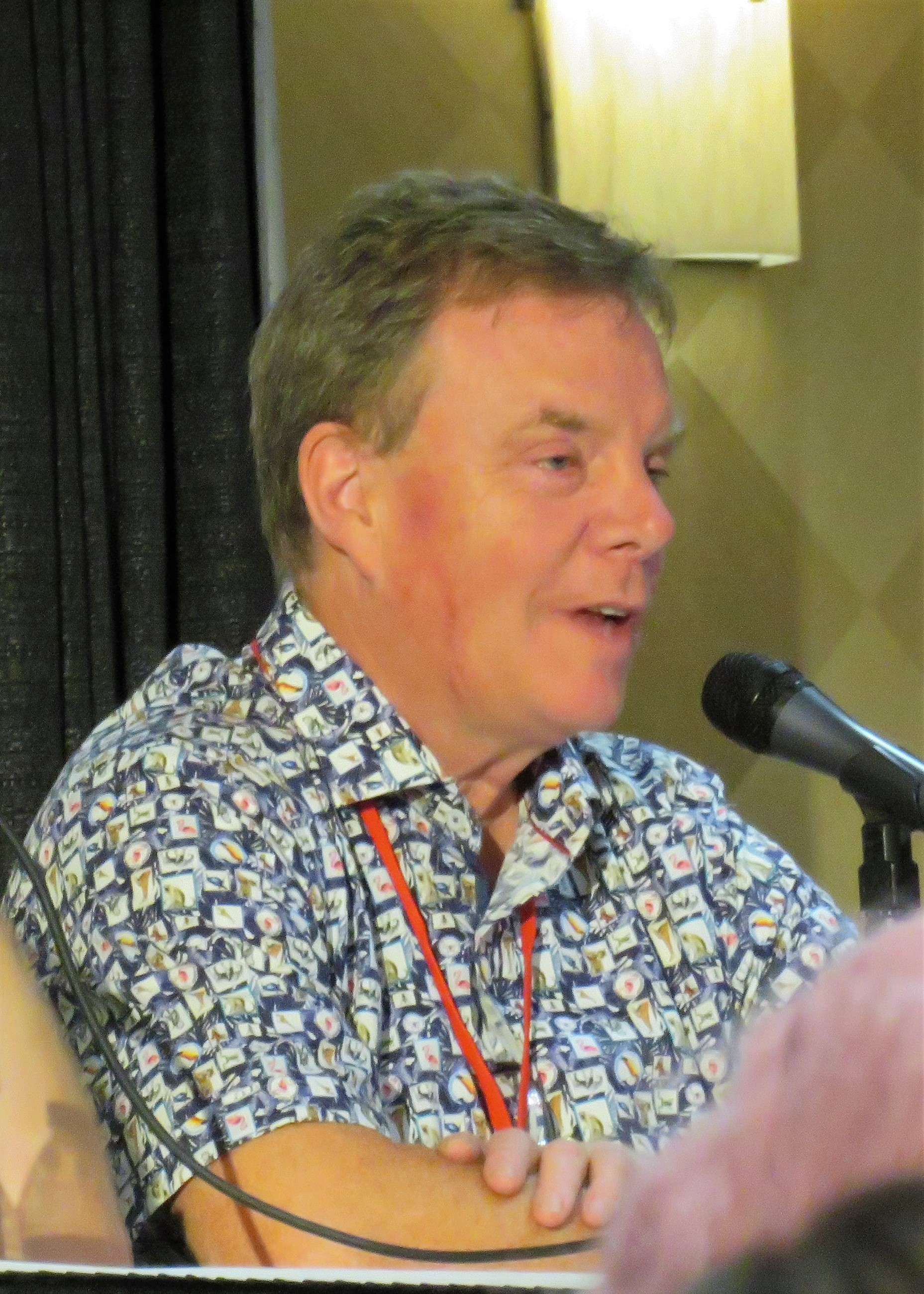
- Tapert in 2018
- Born: Robert Gerard Tapert; May 14, 1955 (age 71); Royal Oak, Michigan, U.S.
- Other name: Robert G. Tapert
- Education: Michigan State University
- Occupations: Film and television producer, screenwriter, television director
- Spouse: Lucy Lawless (m. 1998)
- Children: 2
- Website: robtapert.com

Robert Gerard Tapert (/ˈtæpərt/; born May 14, 1955) is an American film and television producer, writer and director. He is best known for co-creating the television series Xena: Warrior Princess.

== Career ==
=== Film ===
Tapert first became involved with filmmaking while attending Michigan State University where he was studying economics. Through his friend and roommate Ivan Raimi, Tapert would meet future longstanding filmmaking partners Sam Raimi and Bruce Campbell.

Tapert and director Sam Raimi experimented on several short films before endeavoring on their first feature-length picture, a graphic horror film titled The Evil Dead, which Tapert produced, Raimi directed, and Bruce Campbell starred. It was a success with the crowd at the Cannes Film Festival in France, and a glowing review from horror author Stephen King saw the film given a cinematic release in the USA, and later internationally.

Although not a favorite of critics at the time, it gained a cult following and was later critically acclaimed as a horror classic. The film spawned a franchise of five films and a television series, of which Tapert has been involved as a producer in all of them.

Tapert continued on to produce numerous other films, typically involving Raimi or Campbell (or both) in some capacity, such as Crimewave, Easy Wheels, Darkman, Hard Target, Timecop, The Quick and the Dead, A Simple Plan, and The Gift.

Tapert co-founded film production company Ghost House Pictures in 2002. Their first release, The Grudge, grossed nearly $200 million internationally. They followed up that success with Boogeyman, Rise, The Messengers, 30 Days of Night, Drag Me to Hell which Raimi directed, The Possession, and a remake of Tobe Hooper's seminal film Poltergeist.

In 2013, Tapert and Raimi tapped Uruguayan director Fede Álvarez, after seeing his short, Ataque de pánico!, to reimagine The Evil Dead. Diablo Cody contributed a polish to help Americanize the script.

Tapert would re-collaborate with Álvarez and writer Rodo Sayagues in 2016 on the breakout film Don't Breathe that grossed $157 million worldwide. He returned as producer in its 2021 sequel.

=== Television ===
In the 1990s, Tapert produced and/or wrote several television series, including Hercules: The Legendary Journeys, M.A.N.T.I.S., Spy Game, and American Gothic. Tapert also co-created the prequel series Young Hercules that starred Ryan Gosling.

During Hercules, Tapert created the character of Xena which he later spun off into a separate series, Xena: Warrior Princess. The franchise has been referred to as ground-breaking and the character as a feminist and lesbian icon. Xena: Warrior Princess has been credited by many, including Buffy the Vampire Slayer creator Joss Whedon, with blazing the trail for a new generation of female action heroes such as Buffy, Max of Dark Angel, Sydney Bristow of Alias, and the Bride in Quentin Tarantino's Kill Bill. After serving as Lucy Lawless's stunt double on Xena, stunt woman Zoë E. Bell was recruited to be Uma Thurman's stunt double in Tarantino's Kill Bill. By helping to pave the way for female action heroes in television and film, Xena also strengthened the stunt woman profession.

In 2008, Tapert produced Legend of the Seeker, the television adaptation of the popular Sword of Truth books by Terry Goodkind for ABC Studios.

Tapert followed with the Roman epic Spartacus for Starz in 2010, including Spartacus: Blood and Sand, Spartacus: Gods of the Arena, Spartacus: Vengeance, and Spartacus: War of the Damned.

Tapert's most recent television project is Ash vs Evil Dead based on the Evil Dead film franchise that premiered on Starz in 2015.

== Personal life ==
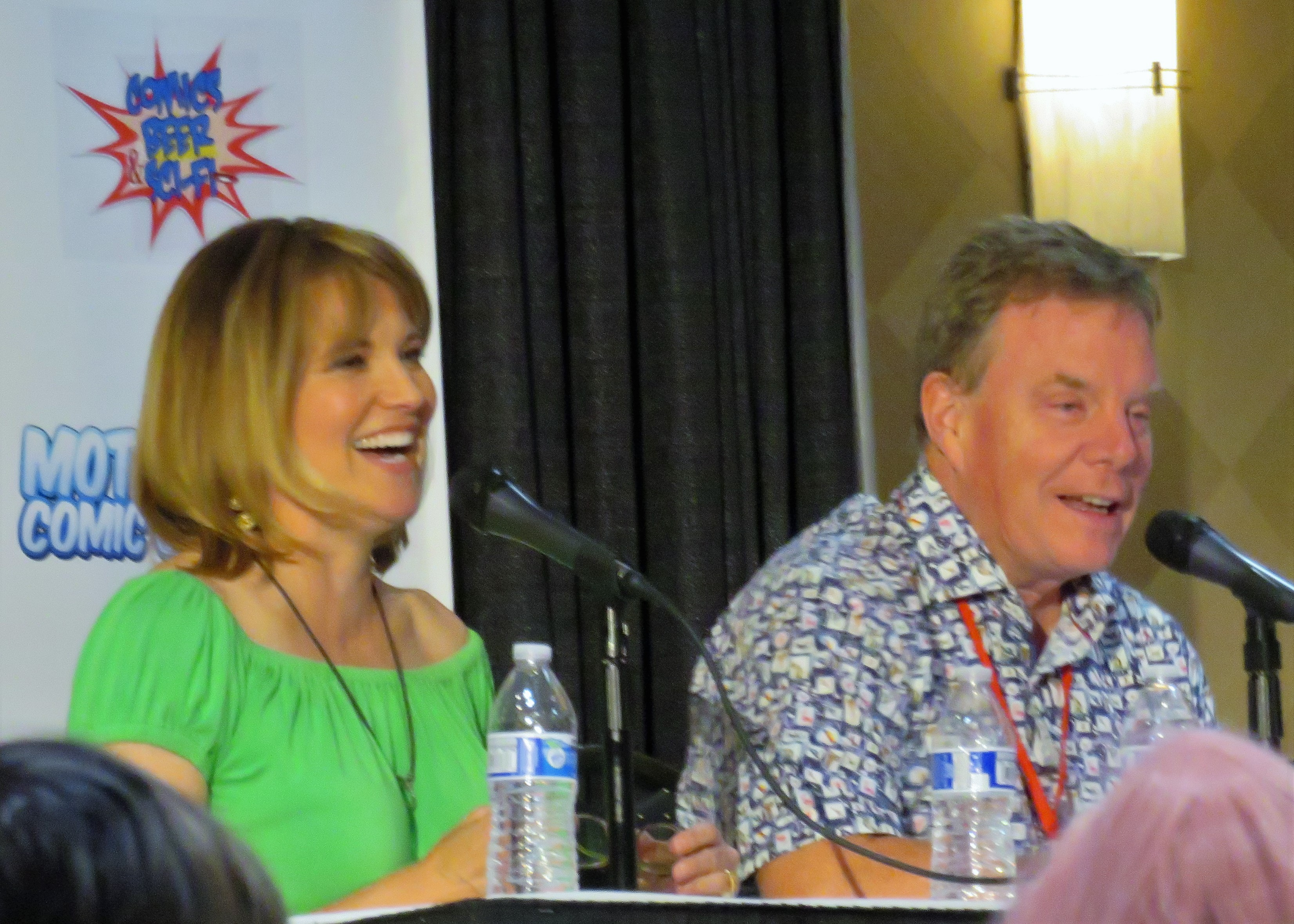
Tapert with his wife Lucy Lawless in 2018

He has been married to actress Lucy Lawless since March 28, 1998; the couple has two sons. Lawless played the title character in Xena: Warrior Princess.

== Filmography ==
=== Film ===
Producer

- Crimewave (1986)
- Evil Dead II (1987)
- Easy Wheels (1989)
- Darkman (1990)
- Army of Darkness (1992)
- Timecop (1994)
- The Grudge (2004)
- Boogeyman (2005)
- The Grudge 2 (2006)
- The Messengers (2007)
- 30 Days of Night (2007)
- Drag Me to Hell (2009)
- The Possession (2012)
- Evil Dead (2013)
- Poltergeist (2015)
- Don't Breathe (2016)
- The Grudge (2019)
- The Unholy (2021)
- Don't Breathe 2 (2021)
- Evil Dead Rise (2023)
- Evil Dead Burn (2026)
- Evil Dead Wrath (2028)
- Play Dead (TBA)

Executive producer

- Within the Woods (1979) (Short film)
- The Evil Dead (1981)
- Lunatics: A Love Story (1991)
- Hard Target (1993)
- The Quick and the Dead (1995)
- The Gift (2000)
- Rise: Blood Hunter (2007)
- Boogeyman 2 (2007)
- Nightbooks (2021)

Acting roles

Year	Title	Role	Notes
1977	The Happy Valley Kid	N/A	Short film
1977	It's Murder!	N/A	
1980	The Blind Waiter	The Deaf Manager	Short film
1981	The Evil Dead	Local Yokel	Uncredited
1981	Torro. Torro. Torro!	N/A	Short film
1982	Cleveland Smith: Bounty Hunter	N/A	Short film
1984	Going Back	Man with Glasses in Bar	Uncredited
1985	The Sappy Sap	N/A	Short film
1986	Crimewave	Bar patron in Rialto	Uncredited
1987	Evil Dead II	Airport Worker	Uncredited

Other roles

Year	Title	Role	Notes
1977	It's Murder!	Sound utility	Uncredited
1979	Within the Woods	Presenter	Short film

=== Direct-to-video ===
Producer

- Battle the Big Tuna (1991) (Documentary film)
- 30 Days of Night: Dark Days (2010)

Executive producer

- Darkman II: The Return of Durant (1995)
- Darkman III: Die Darkman Die (1996)
- Hercules and Xena – The Animated Movie: The Battle for Mount Olympus (1998)
- Messengers 2: The Scarecrow (2009)

=== Television ===
Year(s)	Title	Director	Writer	Executive Producer	Notes
1992	Darkman	No	No	Yes	TV movie
1994–1995	M.A.N.T.I.S.	No	No	Yes	23 episodes
1994–1999	Hercules: The Legendary Journeys	Yes	Yes	Yes	Wrote and directed episode "Once a Hero"
1995–1998	American Gothic	No	No	Yes	22 episodes
1995–2001	Xena: Warrior Princess	Yes	Yes	Yes	Wrote 15 episodes Directed 4 episodes
1997	Spy Game	No	No	Yes	13 episodes
1997	Amazon High	No	Story	No	TV movie
1998–1999	Young Hercules	No	Yes	Yes	Wrote 3 episodes
2000	Jack of All Trades	No	No	Yes	22 episodes
2000–2001	Cleopatra 2525	No	Yes	Yes	Wrote episode "Quest for Firepower"
2005	Alien Apocalypse	No	Uncredited	No	TV movie
2008–2010	Legend of the Seeker	No	No	Yes	44 episodes
2009	13: Fear Is Real	No	No	Yes	8 episodes
2010	Zombie Roadkill	No	No	Yes	6 episodes
2010–2013	Spartacus	No	No	Yes	39 episodes
2015–2018	Ash vs Evil Dead	No	No	Yes	30 episodes

Acting roles

Year	Title	Role	Notes
1995	Hercules: The Legendary Journeys	Crowd Member (uncredited)	Episode "Gladiator"
1997	Xena: Warrior Princess	Himself	Episode "The Xena Scrolls"

=== Video game ===
Year	Title	Role
2005	Evil Dead: Regeneration	Supervising producer

== Musical ==
Tapert produced the stage musical Pleasuredome as a love story to 1980's New York City incorporating songs from the era. The play, which was based on Tapert's personal experiences, successfully premiered in 2017 to critical acclaim and sold-out crowds in Tapert's home of Auckland, New Zealand and stars Lucy Lawless.

57,000 tickets were sold during its first 13-week run.
