= Evil Dead (soundtrack) =

Evil Dead (Original Motion Picture Soundtrack)

Film score by Roque Baños
- Released: April 9, 2013
- Genre: Film score
- Length: 43:04
- Label: La-La Land

Roque Baños chronology
The Oxford Murders (2008)	Evil Dead (2013)	Oldboy (2013)

Evil Dead (Original Motion Picture Soundtrack) is the soundtrack to the 2013 film Evil Dead directed by Fede Álvarez and featured musical score composed by Roque Baños. The film is the fourth instalment in the Evil Dead franchise and a "reimagining" of Sam Raimi's The Evil Dead (1981).

== Development ==
Evil Dead is Baños' first score for an American feature film; being a fan of the first three films of the Evil Dead franchise, he contacted Álvarez through Facebook who accepted his request and eventually agreed on his involvement to score music for the film. After convincing the producers, by using one of Baños' pre-existing composition for the edit, the makers agreed to have him on board. Baños found it as a risky process for producing a fresh score for a remake as he had to introduce new thematic ideas, but also revisit on the classical sounds produced by Joseph LoDuca for the 1981 film, with more contemporary language presenting a fresh orchestral texture. Baños eventually conducted a huge orchestra to expand the film's gothic nature. Álvarez and Baños wanted to bring the scariest music possible based on the degree of horror being very extreme, he did not find it to be over-the-top. As a result of scoring the film, Baños recalled that he had nightmares for two weeks after finishing the film's music and had to close his eyes several times during that period; he found the score to be scarier than his prior horror film compositions.

== Critical reception ==
Gregory Heaney of AllMusic wrote "although not as fun or inventive as Joseph LoDuca's score for the original, Baños' version is a fitting soundtrack to the film's slick reimagining." Mike Gencarelli of Media Mikes wrote "Evil Dead takes the cake and kicks that score in the balls". Michael Gingold of Fangoria found it to be "genuinely frightening". Joe Leydon of Variety and Manohla Dargis of The New York Times also described it to be "thrilling" and "nerve-jangling".

== Track listing ==
The original score was released through La-La Land Records digitally on April 9, 2013, four days after the film. A deluxe edition of the album with the cues different from that of the digital version was released on CD on April 23.

Evil Dead (Original Motion Picture Soundtrack)
No.	Title	Length
1.	"I'll Rip Your Soul Out" (extended)	5:28
2.	"Sad Memories"	5:21
3.	"Finding the Book"	2:09
4.	"Demon Possession"	2:23
5.	"She Tried to Kill Me"	2:31
6.	"He Won't Let You Out"	2:45
7.	"Three Ways of Saving Her Soul"	4:01
8.	"I'll Do What I Gotta Do"	5:09
9.	"Come Back to Me"	3:01
10.	"Abominations Rising"	6:56
11.	"The Pendant / Evil Tango"	3:20
Total length:		43:04

Evil Dead (Original Motion Picture Soundtrack) – Deluxe edition
No.	Title	Length
1.	"I'll Rip Your Soul Out"	4:50
2.	"Sad Memories"	5:21
3.	"Don't Say It, Don't Write It, Don't Hear It"	4:42
4.	"Demon Possession" (extended)	4:21
5.	"Get Me Out of Here"	5:24
6.	"He Won't Let You Out"	2:45
7.	"Bloody Kiss"	2:23
8.	"Three Ways of Saving Her Soul"	4:01
9.	"Natalie Hunting"	5:34
10.	"I'll Do What I Gotta Do" (extended)	8:42
11.	"Come Back to Me"	3:01
12.	"He's Coming"	3:21
13.	"Abominations Rising"	6:56
14.	"The Pendant / Evil Tango"	3:20
15.	"The Evil Dead Main Theme"	1:41
16.	"Come Back to Me" (alternate)	2:01
Total length:		68:23

== Accolades ==
It has been shortlisted as one among the 114 contenders for Academy Award for Best Original Score at the 86th Academy Awards.

Accolades for Evil Dead (Original Motion Picture Soundtrack)
Year	Award	Category	Recipient	Result
2013	International Film Music Critics Association	Best Original Score for a Fantasy/Science Fiction/Horror Film	Roque Baños	Won
2013	International Film Music Critics Association	Film Music Composition of the Year	Roque Baños for the composition track "Abominations Rising"	Won
2013	International Film Music Critics Association	Film Score of the Year	Roque Baños	Nominated
