= Don't Breathe 2 =

2021 film by Rodo Sayagues

- Theatrical release poster
- Directed by: Rodo Sayagues
- Written by: Fede Álvarez; Rodo Sayagues
- Based on: Characters by: Fede Álvarez; Rodo Sayagues
- Produced by: Fede Álvarez; Sam Raimi; Rob Tapert
- Starring: Stephen Lang; Brendan Sexton III; Madelyn Grace
- Cinematography: Pedro Luque
- Edited by: Jan Kovac
- Music by: Roque Baños
- Production companies: Screen Gems; Stage 6 Films; Ghost House Pictures; Bad Hombre
- Distributed by: Sony Pictures Releasing
- Release date: August 13, 2021
- Running time: 98 minutes
- Country: United States
- Language: English
- Budget: $15 million
- Box office: $53.8 million

Don't Breathe 2 is a 2021 American horror film directed by Rodo Sayagues, who co-wrote it with Fede Álvarez. It is the sequel to Don't Breathe (2016) and the second installment in the Don't Breathe franchise. The film stars Stephen Lang, reprising his role as Norman Nordstrom, with Brendan Sexton III and Madelyn Grace in supporting roles.

After the critical and commercial success of the first film, talks for a sequel began in November 2016, with Álvarez then set to return as the film's director. In January 2020, the project was green-lit, with Sayagues replacing Álvarez as director and Lang reprising his role. Principal photography began in August 2020, in Belgrade, Serbia, and wrapped in October.

Don't Breathe 2 was released in the United States on August 13, 2021, by Sony Pictures Releasing. The film grossed over $53 million worldwide and received mixed reviews from critics.

== Plot ==
Eight years after the events of the first film, blind Navy SEAL veteran Norman Nordstrom lives with his 11-year-old daughter Phoenix and his rottweiler Shadow in a Detroit suburb. Norman tells Phoenix that her birth mother died in a fire in their old house.

Hernandez, Norman's only connection with society and a veteran Army Ranger, convinces Norman to let Phoenix accompany her on an errand in town to have some time out of the house. Whilst on their trip, Hernandez lets Phoenix visit her old burnt down house where her mom supposedly died. A gangster named Raylan attempts to abduct Phoenix but is scared away by Shadow. His gang follows Hernandez's van back to Norman's where they wait for her to drop Phoenix off, before proceeding to block off the road with their vans and murder Hernandez by bashing her to death with a hammer. They lure Shadow away and kill him off-screen. When Norman goes outside to look for Shadow, the gang breaks in to kidnap Phoenix. A struggle ensues between Norman and the gang, and Raylan tells Phoenix that he is her real father, confirming it by showing they both have a streak of white hair.

It is revealed that Phoenix's house burned down after a meth lab explosion in the basement, and Raylan had been jailed for eight years. Norman found Phoenix unconscious in the wreckage and took her home to take the place of his dead daughter. Upon release, Raylan saw Phoenix alive when she left flowers at her mother's memorial. Phoenix is chloroformed by a henchman. Raylan sets his own dog to kill Norman, who traps the animal in the attic. The gang sets the house on fire and leaves with Phoenix. Norman befriends the dog as they escape together, and it leads him to the gang's hotel hideout.

At the hotel, Raylan reveals Phoenix's real name is Tara and introduces her to her mother, who is alive but terminally ill. She explains that she triggered the explosion while cooking meth, resulting in the poisoning of her internal organs. Tara's parents have abducted her in order to transplant her compatible organs for Tara's mother. Due to a lack of drugs and facilities, Tara will be alive and awake while her heart is removed. Norman arrives and shuts the power off, preventing the procedure. Raylan's men are ambushed by Norman, who exploits the dark to pick them off one by one. Norman also kills the surgeon, and a stray gunshot kills Tara's mother. Norman gouges out Raylan's eyes and leaves him for dead.

A badly wounded Norman confirms to Tara that her father was telling the truth. He confesses his crimes, including murder and rape, and tells her to flee to safety. Raylan appears and stabs Norman, only to be fatally stabbed by Tara. She attempts to help Norman, claiming she can save him, to which he replies she already has, before apparently succumbing to his wounds. Tara leaves and heads to a children's home she had seen earlier. She approaches a group of children playing and introduces herself as Phoenix.

== Cast ==
- Stephen Lang as Norman Nordstrom/"The Blind Man": A blind U.S. Navy SEAL veteran who recovered from his injuries in the first film, and now lives in an isolated home with his adopted daughter Phoenix, whom he rescued from a house fire.
- Brendan Sexton III as Raylan: A gang leader, former convict, and Phoenix's biological father who kidnaps her so he can transfer her heart to his paralyzed wife Josephine.
- Madelyn Grace as Phoenix / Tara: Norman's adopted daughter.
- Adam Young as Jim Bob: Raylan's main thug.
- Bobby Schofield as Jared: Jim Bob's brother who is also a thug working for Raylan.
- Rocci Williams as Duke: One of Raylan's thugs.
- Christian Zagia as Raul: One of Raylan's thugs, who eventually teams up with Norman having found out Raylan's true motives. Zagia is the only other actor to reprise his role from the first film.
- Steffan Rhodri as The Surgeon/Dr. Thomas Hanniman: A surgeon who works on the operation in trying to remove Phoenix's heart so it can be transferred to Josephine.
- Stephanie Arcila as Hernandez: A former US Army Ranger and friend of Norman.
- Diaana Babnicova as Billie
- Fiona O'Shaughnessy as Josephine: Phoenix's paralyzed biological mother and Raylan's wife.

== Production ==
In November 2016, writer Fede Álvarez announced that a sequel to Don't Breathe was in the works, and that he was set to return as director. Producer Sam Raimi called it "only the greatest idea for a sequel I've ever heard. I'm not kidding." In November 2018, Álvarez discussed sequels to both his Don't Breathe and Evil Dead, saying, "They're just ideas right now. Nothing to announce officially. We do have a script for Don't Breathe 2. That's the only difference. We don't have a script for Evil Dead 2. But we do have a script for Don't Breathe 2 that we wrote." He also said, "When I tweeted that I was interested in seeing what people prefer. We were having some internal debates about what people would be interested in most. Unfortunately, Evil Dead 2 won. Which, I guess I would have preferred Don't Breathe 2 to win because it's one of my own creations. Obviously Evil Dead has the bigger following."

In January 2020, Álvarez was replaced as director by Rodo Sayagues, the co-writer of both Don't Breathe films, making his directorial debut. In a March 2021 interview, Stephen Lang stated that in preparation for reprising the role of Norman Nordstrom, he worked with The Northeastern Association for the Blind in Albany, New York to accurately depict the mannerisms of someone afflicted with being blind.

Principal photography began on August 7, 2020, in Belgrade, Serbia, with Pedro Luque serving as cinematographer, returning from the previous film. Production was previously set to begin in April 2020, but was delayed due to the COVID-19 pandemic. In July 2020, prior to filming, Stephen Lang quarantined himself for ten days after arriving in Serbia. Lang revealed that filming wrapped on October 8, 2020. By March 2021, post-production on the film was said to be finished, according to Álvarez, who "watched it not too long ago," calling it "fantastic," and later stating he thinks it's better than the first film. In May 2021, Roque Baños was revealed to have composed the score for Don't Breathe 2, having returned from the first film. During post-production, Jan Kovac served as lead editor.

== Release ==
Don't Breathe 2 was theatrically released in the United States on the Friday the 13th of August 2021, by Sony Pictures Releasing.

=== Home media ===
The film was released on video-on-demand on September 3, 2021, and selected on rent and digital download on October 12, 2021, while 4K Ultra HD, Blu-ray and DVD on October 26, 2021, by Sony Pictures Home Entertainment. Special features include a filmmaker audio commentary, a never-before-seen alternate ending, three featurettes of a Friends & Filmmakers, a Bad Man and Designing Deception.

The alternate ending shows Tara being dropped off by Raul, one of Raylan's former thugs, at a children's home.

== Reception ==
=== Box office ===
Don't Breathe 2 grossed $32.7 million in the United States and Canada, and $21.1 million in other territories, for a worldwide total of $53.8 million.

In the United States and Canada, Don't Breathe 2 was released alongside Free Guy and Respect, and was projected to gross $8–12 million from 3,005 theaters in its opening weekend. The film made $4.4 million on its first day, including $965,000 from Thursday night previews. It went on to debut to $10.6 million, finishing in second place behind Free Guy. The film made $5.1 million in its second weekend (a drop of 51%), finishing fourth, then $2.8 million in its third weekend.

=== Critical response ===
On review aggregator Rotten Tomatoes, the film holds an approval rating of 43% based on 82 reviews, with an average rating of 4.90/10. The website's critics consensus reads, "Stephen Lang remains a thrillingly imposing presence in Don't Breathe 2, but this sequel's story strains to find a sensible way forward for his character." On Metacritic, the film has a weighted average score of 46 out of 100 based on 19 critics, indicating "mixed or average" reviews. Audiences polled by CinemaScore gave the film an average grade of "B" on an A+ to F scale (down from the "B+" earned by its predecessor), while PostTrak reported 73% of audience members gave it a positive score, with 55% saying they would definitely recommend it.

John DeFore of The Hollywood Reporter wrote: "Where the first film offered genuine scares, this one is suspenseful at best, snicker-worthy at worst, and will beg viewers to recall the time Fonzie got on water skis and tried not to get eaten by a shark." Benjamin Lee of The Guardian gave the film a score of 1/5 stars, praising Lang as "an effectively imposing physical presence", but described the film as "an unforgivably dull piece of product that should never have breathed in the first place", and said that the antagonists were "made as cartoonishly awful as possible", adding: "their ultimate plan for the girl [is] so laughably repulsive that suddenly, problematically, Nordstrom is made to seem like the better option." William Bibbiani of TheWrap praised Lang and Grace's performances, but described the film as "a clunky home-invasion thriller", adding: "it seems more like the filmmakers wanted to purge their creation of its wickedness than tell a story about that wickedness which makes sense."

Jesse Hassenger of The A.V. Club was more positive in his review of the film, giving it a grade of B−. He wrote: "Don't Breathe 2 is more effective—maybe even a little mischievously insidious—in its attempted villain rehab when it sticks to smaller gestures, like Norman's already established affinity for cuddly canine sidekicks." Christy Lemire, writing for RogerEbert.com, gave the film a score of 2.5/4 stars, praising Lang's performance and writing: "the most daring feat of all in Don't Breathe 2 is its attempt to completely rehabilitate Norman. It's admirable and even unusual that a studio movie would offer such moral ambiguity in its horror hero—and that's definitely what he is here, comparatively—but the cause for his torment lingers until the end."

=== Accolades ===
The film was nominated for "Worst Film of 2021" at the Hawaii Film Critics Society.

== Sequel ==
In August 2021, Álvarez and Sayagues expressed interest in developing a sequel, acknowledging that Rocky from the first movie may appear in a future film. The filmmakers elaborated that there are plans to explore additional characters from the first movie, stating that by the end of Don't Breathe, the stories of Norman Nordstrom / "The Blind Man" and Jane Levy's Roxanne "Rocky" were intentionally left open-ended, as both characters got away with different illegal activities. The pair stated that they intend to explore the consequences that both characters face for their criminal actions, with each of their pasts catching up to them in different movies. Sayagues stated that they intend to continue Roxanne's story in the future. That same month, in a number of interviews, Lang expressed interest in reprising his role in additional movies.

By August 2022, it was reported that a third film was officially in development. In October 2022, Lang confirmed that he is currently preparing to reprise his role in a third film. By June 2025, Stephen Lang acknowledged that the concept for the third film was complete, but stated that progress had backtacked. The actor expressed continued interest in the film completing the trilogy, and suggested that he would want his character to die in the sequel.

In September 2026, Álvarez announced that the third movie was once again in active development. The filmmaker announced that he had completed the script, while also confirming that Lang and Jane Levy will reprise their roles from previous installments.
