= It's Murder! =

- Film poster
- Directed by: Sam Raimi
- Written by: Sam Raimi; Scott Spiegel
- Produced by: Sam Raimi; Scott Spiegel
- Starring: Scott Spiegel; Sam Raimi; Bruce Campbell; Ted Raimi
- Cinematography: Bruce Campbell; John Cameron; Mike Ditz; Ted Raimi
- Distributed by: Sam Raimi
- Release date: 1978
- Running time: 71 minutes
- Language: English

It's Murder! is a 1978 amateur Super 8 crime comedy film directed by Sam Raimi while he was a student at Michigan State University. It was co-written and produced by Raimi and Scott Spiegel, and stars both Raimi and Spiegel alongside their frequent collaborator Bruce Campbell. Raimi's first feature-length film, it was screened publicly at both Groves High School and MSU, but was never distributed commercially.

== Plot ==
The film tells the story of a family whose uncle is murdered. The son (Sam Raimi) gets everything because he is in the will. A detective (Scott Spiegel) is trying to find out who murdered the uncle while avoiding ending up dead as well.

== Cast ==
- Scott Spiegel
- Sam Raimi
- Cheryl Guttridge
- Richard Smith
- Matt Taylor
- Bill Aaron
- Ted Raimi
- Bruce Campbell
- Ivan M. Raimi
- William E. Kirk
- Robert Tapert
- Tim Quill
- Jon Page
- Josh Becker
- Bill Ward
- Paul Krispin
- Clay Warnock
- Mike Ditz

== Production ==
It's Murder! was mostly shot in the summer of 1977. In the fall, when much of the cast and crew had to go back to school, Campbell and Spiegel "wound up running around grabbing shots on weekends and sending them to Sam so he could cut them in." It was shot on Super 8 film with a budget of $2,000.

== Release ==
It's Murder! was screened publicly at both Michigan State University and Wylie E. Groves High School in late 1978 and early 1979, but it was never distributed commercially. Raimi would refer to the film as "terrible" in a later interview, with the only other audience member during an initial screening walking out and leaving Raimi by himself, who stated that the experience "was a very sad forty minutes watching the rest of that movie, alone in that theater in the darkness, thinking I've got to make better movies than this because I can’t live like this. It’s too awful."
