= Ataque de pánico! =

- Screenshot from the film
- Directed by: Fede Álvarez
- Written by: Fede Álvarez; Rodo Sayagues
- Produced by: Emiliano Mazza; Fede Álvarez
- Starring: Christian Zagia; Sergio Rondan; Diego Garrido; Ariadna Santini; Rodo Sayagues; Martín Sarthou
- Cinematography: Pedro Luque
- Edited by: Fede Álvarez
- Music by: John Murphy; Rodrigo Gómez
- Production company: MURDOC Films
- Release date: October 31, 2009 (Buenos Aires Rojo Sangre)
- Running time: 4:48
- Country: Uruguay
- Language: Spanish
- Budget: $300

Ataque de pánico! (English: Panic Attack!) is a 2009 Uruguayan science fiction short film directed by independent filmmaker Fede Álvarez.

== Plot ==
Giant robots appear out of the mist and attack Montevideo, the capital of Uruguay. Accompanied by a squadron of spacecraft, they fire weapons at the city and destroy key buildings, leading to mass panic. The military fights back to little avail. At the end of the film, the robots fuse together to form a giant sphere, which then detonates and engulfs the city in a fireball. No explanation is given for the attack.

== Production ==
A trailer of the film was uploaded to YouTube in October 2006, with some scenes from the finished version. The official production budget of the film was stated as only $300. In addition to writing, editing and directing the film, Álvarez created the visual effects based on computer-generated imagery.

== Release ==
The film was premiered on October 31, 2009, at the Buenos Aires Rojo Sangre film festival and uploaded to YouTube on November 3, 2009. Following widespread media coverage, Álvarez was offered a 30-million-dollar Hollywood deal to develop and direct a full-length film.

== Soundtrack ==
The music accompanying most of the short is "In the House – In a Heartbeat", an instrumental piece by John Murphy. The music was originally composed for the 2002 film 28 Days Later.

== Reaction ==
After being uploaded to YouTube, the film's reputation spread by word of mouth, and received a boost when it was linked from the blog of Kanye West. Fede Álvarez stated in a BBC interview: "I uploaded Panic Attack! on a Thursday and on Monday my inbox was totally full of e-mails from Hollywood studios."

As a result of the popularity of the short, Ghost House Pictures signed with Álvarez for him to develop a new project. The resulting film was Evil Dead, the fourth film in the Evil Dead franchise, released in the United States on April 5, 2013.

The film has been cited as an example of the increasing influence of the Internet in finding new talent for Hollywood studios.

== Cast ==
- Diego Garrido
- Pedro Luque
- Ariadna Santini
- Rodo Sayagues
- Martín Sarthou (real-life Uruguayan news anchor)
