= Don't Breathe =

2016 film by Fede Álvarez

- Theatrical release poster
- Directed by: Fede Álvarez
- Written by: Fede Álvarez; Rodo Sayagues
- Produced by: Sam Raimi; Rob Tapert; Fede Álvarez
- Starring: Jane Levy; Dylan Minnette; Daniel Zovatto; Stephen Lang
- Cinematography: Pedro Luque
- Edited by: Eric L. Beason; Louise Ford; Gardner Gould
- Music by: Roque Baños
- Production companies: Screen Gems; Stage 6 Films; Ghost House Pictures
- Distributed by: Sony Pictures Releasing
- Release dates: March 12, 2016 (SXSW); August 26, 2016 (United States)
- Running time: 88 minutes
- Country: United States
- Language: English
- Budget: $9.9 million
- Box office: $157.8 million

Don't Breathe is a 2016 American horror film co-produced and directed by Fede Álvarez, who co-wrote it with Rodo Sayagues. It is the first installment in the Don't Breathe franchise. The film stars Jane Levy, Dylan Minnette, Daniel Zovatto, and Stephen Lang, and focuses on three home intruders who find themselves trapped and hunted in the home of their blind target.

The project, originally titled A Man in the Dark, was announced in early 2014, with Álvarez directing, Sayagues writing, and Levy starring. In contrast to his previous work on Evil Dead (2013), which Levy also starred in, Álvarez decided the project would have less blood, an original storyline, more suspense, and no dependence on supernatural elements—which he felt were overused. Principal photography began in June 2015, and wrapped in July in Detroit.

Don't Breathe premiered at South by Southwest on March 12, 2016, and was theatrically released on August 26, by Sony Pictures Releasing. The film grossed over $157 million worldwide and received positive reviews from critics. A sequel, Don't Breathe 2, was released in August 2021.

== Plot ==
Rocky, Alex, and Money are three Detroit delinquents who make a living by breaking into houses and stealing valuables. Rocky longs to move to California with her younger sister, Diddy, and escape from their abusive mother and her alcoholic boyfriend. To the trio's frustration, their fence keeps undervaluing the items they bring.

Money receives a tip from their fence that Gulf War veteran Norman Nordstrom has $300,000 in cash in his house in an abandoned Detroit neighborhood. It was reportedly a settlement after a wealthy young woman, Cindy Roberts, killed Norman's daughter in a car accident. The three spy on the house and learn that Norman is blind (due to both his eyes being injured by exploded grenade shrapnel during his tour of duty in Iraq).

At night, the gang approach the house, drug Norman's rottweiler, then break in. Money puts a sleeping gas bottle in Norman’s bedroom. Seeing a locked basement door, he assumes the loot is hidden in there and shoots the lock. The noise wakes up Norman, who overpowers Money, takes the gun, and kills him while Rocky, horrified, watches silently.

Rocky witnesses Norman open a hidden safe to check his valuables. After he leaves, she opens it and takes the cash. However, he finds her and Money’s shoes and realizes there are more intruders, then returns to find the safe empty.

Rocky and Alex evade Norman and enter the basement. There, they find a restrained and gagged pregnant woman who reveals herself to be Cindy Roberts. Rocky and Alex free her and attempt to open the storm cellar door. Norman shoots at them, unintentionally killing Cindy. He breaks down and cries in distress over her body. Norman then shuts off the lights, plunging the basement into darkness. After a blind chase and struggle, Alex knocks him out and they flee upstairs.

After blocking the basement door, they encounter the dog, who has awakened, and flee into the bedroom. Rocky escapes the room through a ventilation duct. Alex falls out of a window onto a skylight and is knocked out. When he awakens, Norman shoots out the skylight, corners him in the utility room, and stabs him with a pair of garden shears. The dog pursues Rocky through the vents before she is captured by Norman.

Rocky wakes up restrained in the basement. Norman reveals that Cindy was pregnant with a "replacement" for his daughter. He then prepares to artificially inseminate her using a turkey baster, promising to let her go after she gives him a child. Alex, who survived by tricking Norman into stabbing Money's corpse, saves Rocky and handcuffs Norman.

Rocky and Alex try to leave through the front door. Norman breaks free and shoots Alex dead. Rocky flees as the dog pursues her. She traps it in her car trunk but gets captured again by Norman. After being dragged back inside his house, she disorients him by setting off the alarm system, then hits him repeatedly in the head with a crowbar and pushes him into the basement. The gun fires into Norman's side as he falls. Believing him dead, Rocky escapes before the police arrive.

Later, Rocky, in a cafe train station with Diddy and their pack belongings, see a news report about the incident. Norman, who is recovering in the hospital and in stable condition, is reported to have killed two intruders (Alex and Money) in self-defense. He does not mention Rocky, Cindy nor the stolen cash. Rocky, never looking back at the ordeal again, and Diddy are on their way to their train to California.

== Cast ==
- Jane Levy as Rocky, a Detroit thief who wants to escape to California for a better life
- Dylan Minnette as Alex, a Detroit thief and Rocky's friend
- Daniel Zovatto as Money, a Detroit thief and Rocky's boyfriend
- Stephen Lang as The Blind Man / Norman Nordstrom, a veteran of the Gulf War who was blinded by shrapnel
- Franciska Törőcsik as Cindy, who is connected to the Blind Man through tragedy
- Emma Bercovici as Diddy, Rocky's younger sister
- Christian Zagia as Raul, a fence
- Katia Bokor as Ginger, Rocky's abusive mother
- Sergej Onopko as Trevor, Ginger's boyfriend

== Production ==
=== Development ===
Fede Álvarez noted that making the film was, in some ways, a reaction to his debut film Evil Dead (2013), specifically the criticisms that the film had too much blood, focused too much on shocking the audience, and was a remake. In response, Álvarez decided to make Don't Breathe, an original story that contained less blood and focused more on suspense over shocking audiences. He wanted to avoid making a film dealing with the supernatural, as he felt that was too trendy.

Choosing to make the antagonist blind was a result of deliberately taking abilities away from him; Álvarez explained

"Sometimes you naturally give them powers and make them more menacing than a normal person, so we thought what if we do the other way around and take his eyes out and make him a blind person."

Álvarez has called the film an "exercise in reversal" noting that the film deliberately subverts tropes such as the fact that the house in question is a "nice house on a scary street" as opposed to the opposite, or that the movie is a home invasion story told from the point of view of the invaders.

=== Casting ===
On May 1, 2015, Daniel Zovatto joined the cast. On May 22, 2015, Dylan Minnette was cast in the film, and on June 18, 2015, Jane Levy and Stephen Lang joined the cast.

=== Filming ===
Principal photography began on June 29, 2015. Though the film is set in Detroit, it was primarily shot in Hungary; only a few views of Detroit were actually filmed there. Álvarez estimated that the film cost roughly half as much as Evil Dead, and welcomed the change, as it allowed for less studio interference. Filming wrapped in August 2015.

== Release ==
The film premiered at South by Southwest on March 12, 2016, and was theatrically released on August 26, 2016, by Screen Gems.

=== Home media ===
The film was released on Digital HD on November 8, 2016, and on DVD and Blu-ray on November 29, 2016.

== Reception ==
=== Box office ===
Don't Breathe grossed $89.2 million in North America and $67.9 million in other territories for a worldwide total of $157.1 million, against a production budget of $9.9 million. Due to its low production budget, the film became a sleeper hit and was considered a large financial success, with a net profit of $59.1 million, when factoring together all expenses and revenues. For Sony Pictures, it became their second late-summer surprise hit of 2016, following Sausage Party.

Don't Breathe was released in the United States and Canada on August 26, 2016, and was originally projected to gross $11–14 million from 3,051 theaters in its opening weekend, with some estimates going as high as $20 million, and many publications noting it could be the first film to dethrone Suicide Squad from the top of the box office. It made $1.9 million from Thursday night preview screenings, at 2,500 theaters, and $10 million on its opening day. It fell just 1.5% on Saturday, earning $9.8 million, which is uncommon as R-rated horror films tend to do well on their first day and drop sharply in revenue from their second day onward. Compared to other 2016 horror films, Lights Out had a drop of 22%, while The Conjuring 2 fell by 15%. In total, it grossed $26.4 million in its opening weekend, far above initial projections by 120% and easily displacing Suicide Squad to take the top spot at the box office. It was the biggest original horror debut of the year (besting 10 Cloverfield Lane), the biggest Screen Gems August opening ever (beating Takers) and the biggest debut for an R-rated original horror film since The Conjuring in 2013. Following its first-place finish, the film continued to dominate the box office for the second weekend, earning $15.8 million and an estimated $19.7 million for the four day Labor Day holiday, one of the best numbers ever for the long holiday weekend. As a result, it became only the second horror film to top the weekend box office two weekends in a row since 2014. The second weekend drop was only -40%, a remarkable feat considering the fact that horror films typically tumble at least 60% or more in their second weekend. The gradual drop was due to the holiday. It took only 11 days to surpass Álvarez's previous film, the Evil Dead reboot.

Although the film fell to third place in its third weekend as a result of being overtaken by Sully and When the Bough Breaks, it continued to witness strong holds by falling 49% after adding another 333 theaters.

Outside North America, the film's biggest debuts were in the United Kingdom ($1.3 million), Germany ($1.3 million), Brazil ($1.2 million) Mexico ($1.2 million) and Australia ($1 million). It scored the third biggest opening of the year for a Hollywood film in Korea with $4.5 million. It's on pace to become the highest-grossing horror film in Uruguay.

=== Critical response ===
On review aggregation website Rotten Tomatoes, the film has an approval rating of 88% based on 244 reviews, with an average rating of 7.10/10. The site's critical consensus reads, "Don't Breathe smartly twists its sturdy premise to offer a satisfyingly tense, chilling addition to the home invasion genre that's all the more effective for its simplicity." Metacritic, which assigns a rating to reviews, gives the film a score of 71 out of 100, based on 39 critics, indicating "generally favorable" reviews. Audiences polled by CinemaScore gave the film an average grade of "B+" on an A+ to F scale.

Dennis Harvey of Variety called Don't Breathe "a muscular exercise in brutal, relentless peril that should please genre fans." Jim Vejvoda of IGN awarded 8.8/10 and wrote, "Director Fede Álvarez delivers a lean, very mean thrill ride with Don't Breathe, tapping into several primal human fears and further establishing himself as one of the genre filmmakers to keep an eye on in the years ahead." Peter Travers of Rolling Stone gave the film 3 out of 4 stars, writing: "This is some weird, twisted shit. Don't groan when I say Don't Breathe is a home-invasion thriller. Director Fede Álvarez is as good as it gets when it comes to playing with things that go bump in the night."

Amy Nicholson of MTV wrote in a positive review, "Álvarez knows the size of his ambitions. He's written one great ghoul, surrounded him with targets, and simply let him let rip." The Verge called it "an impressive script-flip from the 1967 classic Wait Until Dark". Álvarez says he wrote the script before watching Wait Until Dark. Jim Hemphill of Filmmaker Magazine called it "the best American horror film in twenty years."

=== Accolades ===
Award	Date of ceremony	Category	Recipient(s)	Result	Ref.
Critics' Choice Movie Awards	December 11, 2016	Best Sci-Fi/Horror Movie	Don't Breathe	Nominated	
Empire Awards	March 19, 2017	Best Horror	Don't Breathe	Nominated	
Fangoria Chainsaw Awards	October 2, 2017	Best Film	Don't Breathe	Nominated	
Fangoria Chainsaw Awards	October 2, 2017	Best Supporting Actor	Stephen Lang	Won	
Saturn Awards	June 28, 2017	Best Horror Film	Don't Breathe	Won	
St. Louis Gateway Film Critics Association	December 18, 2016	Best Horror/Science-Fiction Film	Don't Breathe	Nominated	

== Sequel ==
In November 2016, writer and director Fede Álvarez announced that a sequel was in the works. Producer Sam Raimi commented on the sequel and was quoted saying, "It's only the greatest idea for a sequel I've ever heard. I'm not kidding." In November 2018, Álvarez announced the script for the sequel was completed.

In January 2020, the title was announced as Don't Breathe 2. The film was to begin principal photography in April 2020, with a script co-written by Rodo Sayagues and Álvarez, but was delayed due to the COVID-19 pandemic. Eventually, Sayagues served as director, while the latter served as a producer. On October 8, 2020, Lang revealed filming had completed. The film was released on August 13, 2021.

== See also ==
- List of films featuring home invasions
- List of films featuring psychopaths and sociopaths
