= In the Heart of the Sea (soundtrack) =

In the Heart of the Sea (Original Motion Picture Soundtrack)

Film score by Roque Baños
- Released: December 4, 2015
- Recorded: 2015
- Genre: Film score
- Length: 88:51
- Label: WaterTower Music
- Producer: Roque Baños

Roque Baños chronology
Regression (2015)	In the Heart of the Sea (2015)	Risen (2016)

In the Heart of the Sea (Original Motion Picture Soundtrack) is the soundtrack to the 2015 film of the same name directed by Ron Howard. Featuring original score composed by Roque Baños, the soundtrack featuring 16 tracks was released by WaterTower Music on December 4, 2015, with a deluxe edition containing six bonus tracks was released on December 11.

== Development ==
Howard wanted his regular collaborator Hans Zimmer to score music for the film. Zimmer instead recommend Roque Baños to score for the film. During a discussion with Howard, Baños recalled that the music will be another actor in the film, covering over 50 percent of the film and insisted a dramatic but modern sound, and should not rely on old classical themes. He further suggested him that the music should also convey the peril and passion of the story. Baños used an array of instruments, ranging from ethnic to electrical and orchestral to traditional.

The ethnic flutes were used to convey the force of nature, while the traditional instrument didgeridoo was used to represent the whale. He further used electric cellos and orchestral guitars, but Baños found the percussion as the unusual one saying that he did not want to use percussion on the action sequences, but instead something special, thereby asking Howard to use the objects in the ship for the shooting, including the sails, ropes, hull and various others. He further spent two days recording a pallette of sounds from the ship, which he described it "recording the sounds from the nature" mostly water and air. Furthermore, putting all the sounds used a lot of mixing, which was a "huge experiment". Banos felt that, "there is always a way to combine extremely different instruments. I also created a big library of sounds so then I convert them into notes so then it could be used as music".

== Track listing ==
In the Heart of the Sea (Original Motion Picture Soundtrack)
No.	Title	Length
1.	"Arriving Nickerson's Lair"	2:51
2.	"Chase Walking Nantucket"	2:05
3.	"Farewell"	2:47
4.	"Young Nickerson"	2:16
5.	"Essex Leaving Harbor"	3:06
6.	"The Knockdown"	6:15
7.	"Blows"	7:07
8.	"A Thousand Leagues Out"	3:23
9.	"Lower Away"	3:54
10.	"The Attack"	5:48
11.	"Abandon Ship"	6:09
12.	"Separations"	4:29
13.	"Stand Off"	3:10
14.	"Homecoming"	7:32
15.	"The Story Is Told"	6:41
16.	"The White Whale Chant"	4:38
Total length:		67:33

Bonus tracks
No.	Title	Length
17.	"Meeting Old Nickerson"	2:26
18.	"The Second Attack"	4:19
19.	"Lost at Sea"	2:50
20.	"Desert Island"	3:44
21.	"Finding The Dead"	2:04
22.	"End Credits (Alternate Version)"	1:17
Total length:		88:51

== Reception ==
James Southall of Movie Wave wrote: "With entirely generic modern action music, the orchestra buried behind the standard ubiquitous synth percussion, rather overcooked dramatic swells that occur so often they lose impact, the score is largely without nuance or seemingly any particular regard to the specifics of the film." Pete Simons of Synchrotones called the score as "magnificent" and "one of the best scores of the year". Justin Chang of Variety commented it as "strenuous plucking of every heartstring". Matt Edwards of Den of Geek wrote: "The score picks it up some, too. Created by Roque Baños, it's at times grand and majestic, at others spooky and haunting, selling the isolation of being at sea." Tasha Robinson of The Verge called the score as "frantic" and "insistent".

The score was longlisted among 112 other contenders for the Best Original Score at the 88th Academy Awards.
