= Suburban Hell =

2022 novel by Maureen Kilmer

- First edition cover
- Author: Maureen Kilmer
- Cover artist: Tal Goretsky
- Language: English
- Genre: Horror comedy
- Publisher: G. P. Putnam's Sons
- Publication date: August 30, 2022
- Publication place: New York
- Media type: Print (paperback)
- Pages: 336
- ISBN: 978-0-593-42237-3
- OCLC: 1291310279
- Dewey Decimal: 813/.6
- LC Class: PS3612.I635 S83 2022

Suburban Hell is a horror comedy novel written by first-time author Maureen Kilmer. It was published in 2022 by G. P. Putnam's Sons. The story follows a woman named Amy, and her friends Melissa and Jess, as they battle with their friend Liz's unexpected demonic possession. As Liz's condition worsens, the community of Whispering Farms in the suburban town of Winchester, Illinois is plagued by strange occurrences and disturbing situations such as the death of baby bunnies, an inflatable bouncy house mishap, and exploding bottles of wine.

== Plot ==
Amy is stuck in suburbia where every day is surrounded by PTA meetings, block parties with various dips, and women in black leggings at Target, which Amy refers to as "the community watering hole." The days are monotonous, and with her failing to find a job in social work, Amy's only solace comes from spending time with her best friends, Melissa, Jess, and Liz. The foursome gather every month at Liz's home for snacks, wine, and movies.

Unfortunately, their gathering takes a disastrous turn one night when Liz, who is building what she calls a "She Shed" for them to use as a hangout in the backyard, is unexpectedly inhabited by some kind of demonic force. Melissa and Jess don't believe there is any evil entity at first, but after some digging and research, the friends discover that Liz is inhabited by the spirit of a woman named Mavis, who went mad and killed her entire family.

Now Amy, Melissa, and Jess must do whatever it takes to stop Mavis, save Liz, and reclaim their safe and comfortable suburban lives in the Whispering Farms neighborhood in Winchester, Illinois.

== Reception ==
The book received a starred review from Library Journal where Elyssa Everling called it an entertaining debut that mixed humor and horror well. Publishers Weekly found the same mix of comedy and chiller to be more awkward and found the story "playful but poorly executed."

== Film adaptation ==
The novel was optioned for a feature film adaptation by Legendary Entertainment, Feigco Entertainment and Ghost House Pictures with Joanna Calo writing the script.
