= Sam Raimi =

American filmmaker (born 1959)

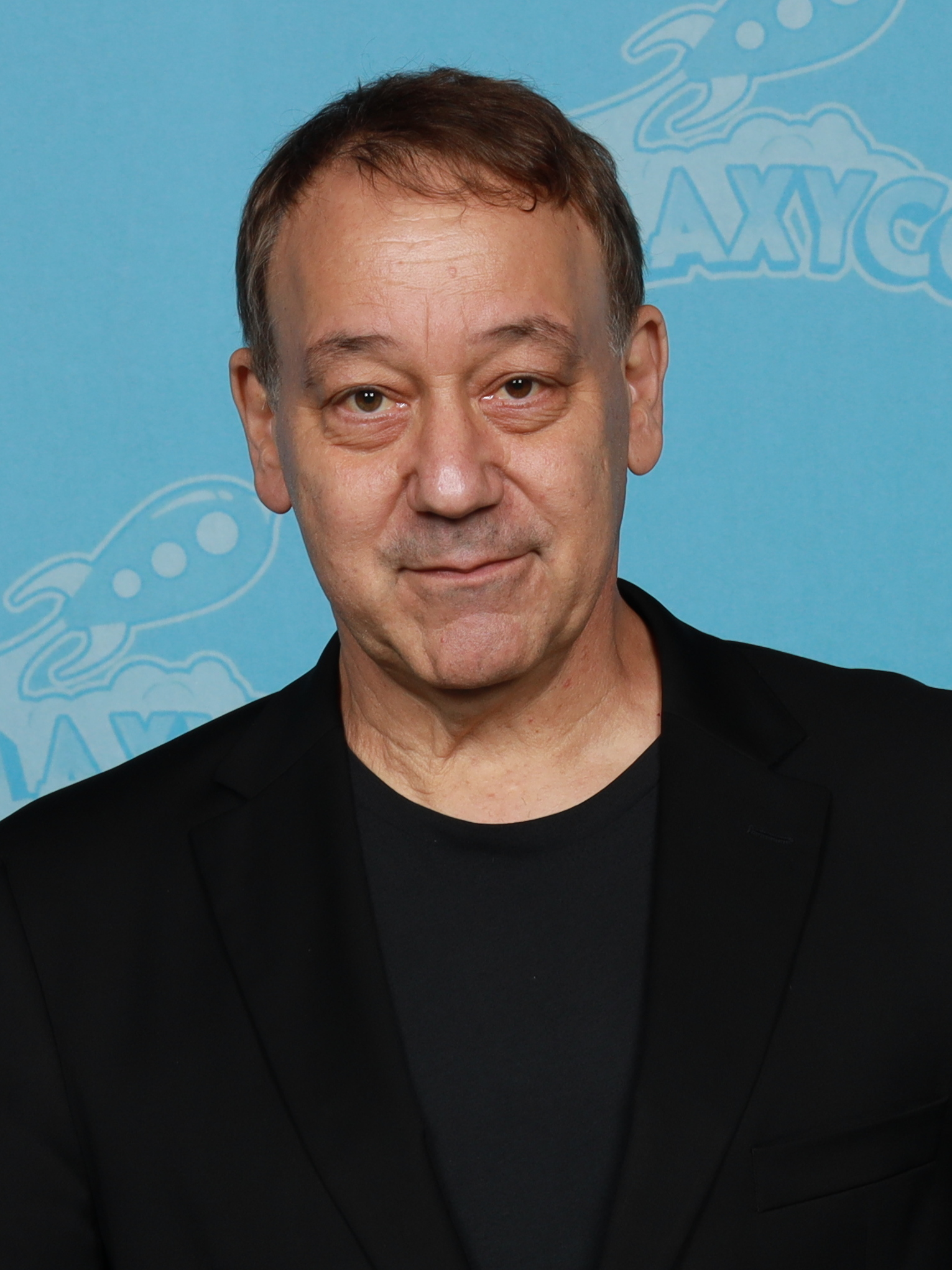
- Raimi at GalaxyCon Raleigh in 2024
- Born: Samuel M. Raimi; October 23, 1959 (age 66); Royal Oak, Michigan, U.S.
- Occupations: Film director; film producer; screenwriter; actor
- Years active: 1972–present
- Spouse: Gillian Greene (m. 1993; sep. 2024)
- Children: 5
- Relatives: Ted Raimi (brother); Ivan Raimi (brother); Lorne Greene (father-in-law)

Samuel M. Raimi (Note: Although some contemporary sources have identified Raimi's middle name as "Marshall", Raimi himself denies this, stating that he merely goes by the middle initial "M".) (/ˈreɪmi/ RAY-mee; born October 23, 1959) is an American filmmaker. He is best known for writing and directing the Evil Dead trilogy (1981–1993) and directing the Spider-Man trilogy (2002–2007). He also directed Darkman (1990), The Quick and the Dead (1995), A Simple Plan (1998), The Gift (2000), Drag Me to Hell (2009), Oz the Great and Powerful (2013), Doctor Strange in the Multiverse of Madness (2022) and Send Help (2026).

His films are known for their highly dynamic visual style, inspired by comic books and slapstick comedy. He founded the production companies Renaissance Pictures in 1979 and Ghost House Pictures in 2002. Raimi has also produced several successful television series, including Hercules: The Legendary Journeys (1995–1997), its spin-off Xena: Warrior Princess (1995–2001), and Ash vs Evil Dead (2015–2018) starring longtime friend and collaborator Bruce Campbell reprising his role in the Evil Dead franchise.

== Early life ==
Samuel M. Raimi was born on October 23, 1959, in Royal Oak, Michigan, a suburb of Detroit. His family was Conservative Jewish. He is a son of merchants Celia Barbara (née Abrams) (1929–2016) and Leonard Ronald Raimi (1926–2021). His ancestors were Jewish immigrants from Russia and Hungary. His younger brother Ted is an actor, and his older brother Ivan is a screenwriter and physician. His older sister, Andrea Raimi Rubin, is a court reporter. Another older brother, Sander, died at 15 in an accidental drowning in Israel; Raimi has said that the trauma knitted the remaining family closer together and "colored everything he's done for the rest of his life." Raimi also mentioned that Sander first introduced him to Spider-Man, igniting his love for comics.

Raimi graduated from Groves High School and later went on to attend Michigan State University and later Università Bocconi in Milan, Italy, where he studied English but left after three semesters to film The Evil Dead.

== Career ==
=== Film ===
Raimi became fascinated with making films when his father brought a movie camera home one day. He began to make Super 8 movies with his friend Bruce Campbell, whom he met in 1975. In college, he collaborated with his brother's roommate Robert Tapert and Campbell to shoot Within the Woods (1979), a 32-minute horror film which raised $375,000, as well as his debut feature film It's Murder!. During that time, he also shot the seven-minute short film Clockwork (1979), starring Scott Spiegel (who had appeared in Within the Woods) and Cheryl Guttridge. Through family, friends, and a network of investors, Raimi was able to finance production of the highly successful horror film The Evil Dead (1981), which became a cult hit and effectively launched Raimi's career.

He began work on his third film Crimewave (1985), which he co-wrote with the then-unknown Coen brothers, shortly after. Intended as a live-action comic book, the film was unsuccessful, partly due to unwanted studio intervention. Raimi then returned to the horror genre with the seminal Evil Dead II (which added slapstick humor to the over-the-top horror, showcasing his love of the Three Stooges). With his brother Ivan Raimi (and crediting himself as Celia Abrams), Sam Raimi also wrote Easy Wheels (1989), which parodied the Outlaw biker film genre. A long-time comic book buff, he then attempted to adapt "The Shadow" into a movie but was unable to secure the rights, so he created his own superhero, Darkman (1990). The film was his first major studio picture, and was commercially successful, spawning two sequels. Through it he was still able to secure funding for Evil Dead III, which was retitled Army of Darkness and largely steered away from horror towards fantasy and comedy elements. Army of Darkness, the final movie in the Evil Dead trilogy, commercially underperformed, yet on video became a cult classic.

In the 1990s, Raimi moved into other genres, directing such films as the western The Quick and the Dead (starring Sharon Stone and Gene Hackman), the highly acclaimed crime thriller A Simple Plan (1998) (starring Bill Paxton and Billy Bob Thornton), and the romantic drama For Love of the Game (1999) (starring Kevin Costner).

Raimi has frequently collaborated with Joel and Ethan Coen, beginning when Joel was one of the editors of Evil Dead. The Coens co-wrote Crimewave and The Hudsucker Proxy with Raimi in the mid-1980s (though Hudsucker was not produced for almost a decade). Raimi made cameo appearances in Miller's Crossing, The Hudsucker Proxy, and with Joel Coen in Spies Like Us. The Coen brothers gave Raimi advice on shooting in snow for A Simple Plan, based on their experiences with Fargo.

Raimi has worked in front of the camera in The Stand as a dimwitted hitman, John Carpenter's Body Bags as a murdered gas station attendant, and Indian Summer in what is perhaps his biggest role as a bumbling assistant to Alan Arkin. The film was written by his childhood friend, writer-director Mike Binder, and shot at the camp that they both attended when they were younger.

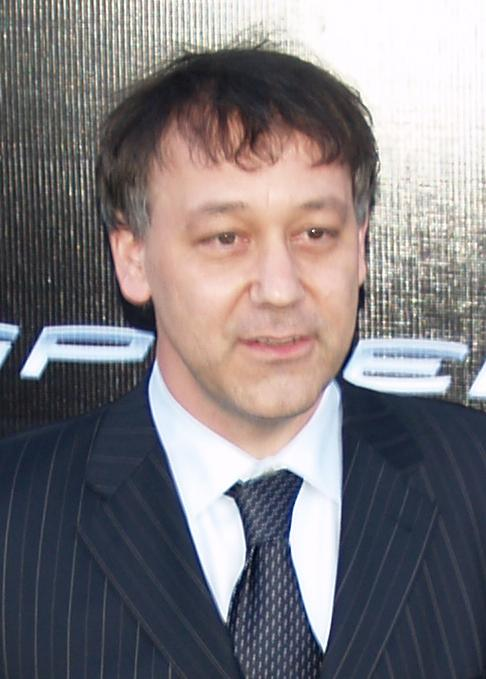
Raimi in 2007

Raimi achieved great critical and commercial success with the blockbuster Spider-Man (2002), which was adapted from the comic book series of the same name. The movie grossed over US$800 million worldwide, spawning two sequels: Spider-Man 2 and Spider-Man 3, both directed by Raimi and each grossing approximately $800 million. After the completion of the third Spider-Man film, he planned on producing two more sequels (although Sony Pictures planned three sequels) but could not find a satisfactory script. In 2022, reflecting on Spider-Man 3, Raimi told Rolling Stone: "It was a very painful experience for me. I wanted to make a Spider-Man movie to redeem myself for that. [The aborted] Spider-Man 4 — that was really what that was about. I wanted to go out on a high note. I didn't want to just make another one that pretty much worked. I had a really high standard in my mind. And I didn't think I could get that script to the level that I was hoping for by that start date." He, along with Marc Webb, were both brought on as creative consultants for Marvel Studios' Spider-Man: No Way Home, directed by Jon Watts.

Raimi produced the entire English-language The Grudge franchise, based on the original Japanese films. On December 11, 2006, the website SuperHeroHype reported that director Sam Raimi and Michael Uslan would co-produce a new film version of The Shadow for Columbia Pictures. On October 16, 2007, Raimi stated that: "I don't have any news on The Shadow at this time, except that the company that I have with Josh Donen, my producing partner, we've got the rights to The Shadow. I love the character very much and we're trying to work on a story that'll do justice to the character." According to Entertainment Weekly, Raimi had expressed an interest in directing a film version of The Hobbit, the prequel to the Lord of the Rings trilogy. In 2008, it was reported Guillermo del Toro would direct with Peter Jackson as the executive producer, though Jackson ultimately directed The Hobbit film series. In 2008, it was reported Raimi might direct By Any Means Necessary, the next film based on the "Jack Ryan" CIA character created by Tom Clancy for Paramount Pictures. Disney also approached him to direct W.I.T.C.H.: The Movie, based on the popular comic.

Raimi directed the horror film Drag Me to Hell, released in 2009 to critical acclaim. Blizzard Entertainment announced on July 22, 2009, that Raimi would be directing a film adaptation of the Warcraft video game series, but at the 2012 San Diego Comic-Con, it was revealed that he would not be the director.

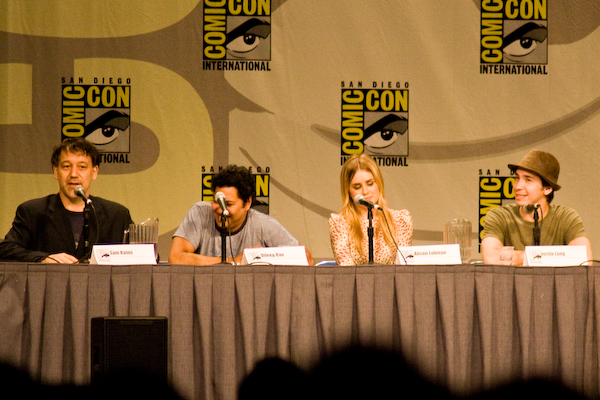
Raimi (far left) at the Drag Me to Hell film discussion panel at the 2008 San Diego Comic-Con

In 2009, it was reported Raimi would produce the British supernatural thriller Refuge, which would be directed by Corin Hardy and published by Mandate Pictures, and the remake of the Danish thriller The Substitute, which would be directed by Scott Derrickson, under his new label Spooky Pictures. In 2010, it was reported he would produce the British thriller flick Burst 3D with his company Ghost House Pictures, directed by Neil Marshall.

Raimi directed Oz the Great and Powerful, which was released on March 8, 2013, by Walt Disney Pictures and grossed $493 million worldwide. He said he would not be directing the planned sequel.

Raimi, along with Bruce Campbell and Rob Tapert, produced 2013's Evil Dead, a remake of Raimi's original film. First-time feature filmmaker Fede Álvarez wrote and directed, and Diablo Cody was also brought in to revise/rewrite the script. Raimi confirmed plans to write Evil Dead 4 with his brother; it was later specified that this film would be Army of Darkness 2. Álvarez revealed that Raimi would direct the sequel to Army of Darkness. However, in a 2014 interview, Bruce Campbell announced that Army of Darkness 2 is not happening, saying "It's all internet b.s. There's no reality whatsoever. These random comments slip out of either my mouth, or Sam Raimi's mouth, next thing you know, we're making a sequel."

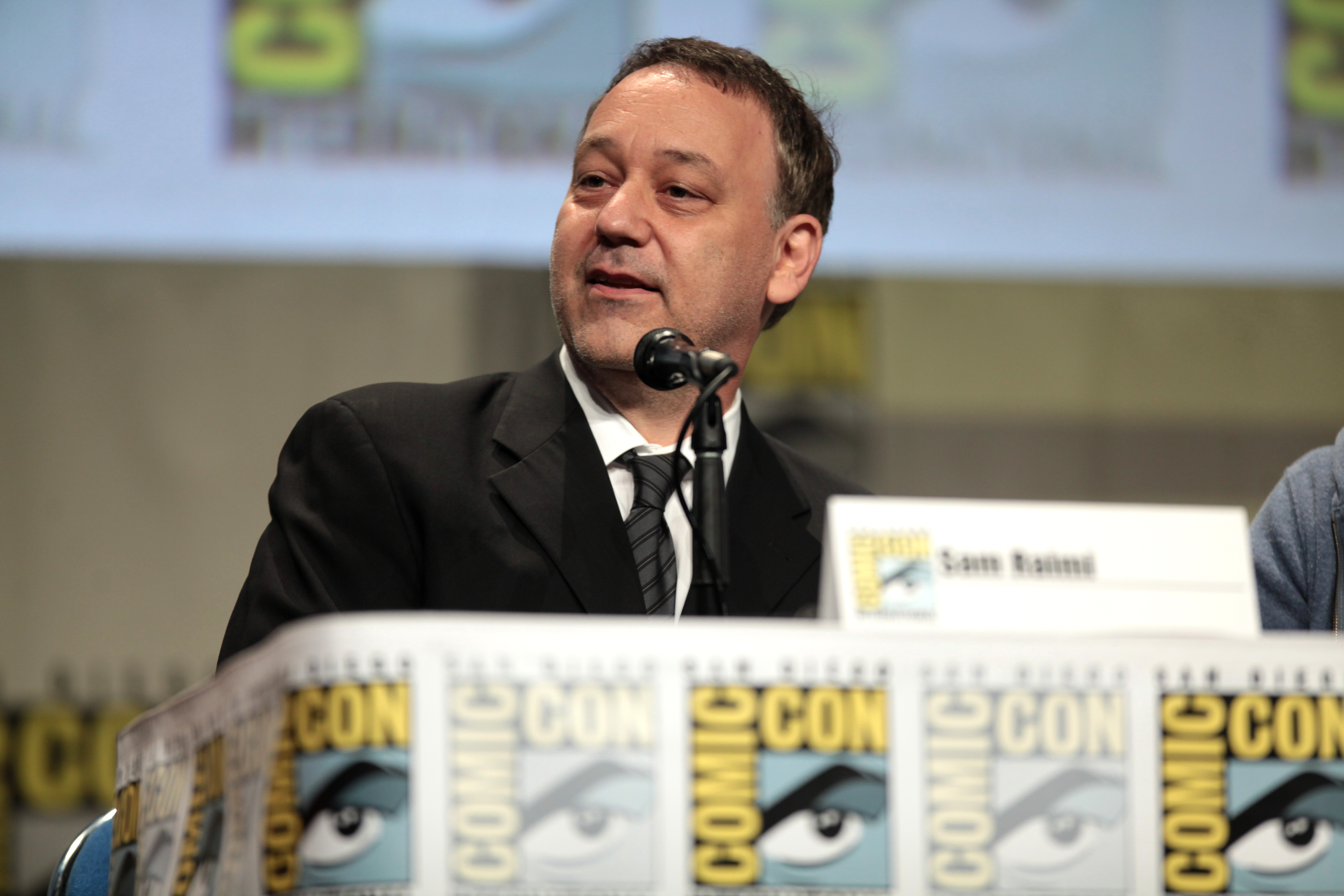
Raimi speaking at the 2014 San Diego Comic-Con

On February 26, 2016, it was confirmed that Raimi was attached to direct the upcoming film World War 3 for Warner Bros. The film would be based on a possible future inspired by the book The Next 100 Years by George Friedman. On February 16, 2017, it was reported that Raimi would be directing a thriller about the Bermuda Triangle for Skydance Media, with the script being written by Doug Miro and Carlo Bernard. By January 29, 2018, Raimi was set to direct the first in the movie adaptations of Patrick Rothfuss's Kingkiller Chronicle series, The Name of the Wind, with Rothfuss and Lin-Manuel Miranda serving as executive producers.

On February 5, 2020, it was announced that Raimi was in talks with Marvel Studios to direct Doctor Strange in the Multiverse of Madness, and Raimi confirmed his involvement in April 2020. This marked Raimi's return to the superhero film genre after more than 15 years following Spider-Man 3 in 2007 and his first feature film directorial effort since 2013's Oz the Great and Powerful.

Raimi next directed the horror-thriller film Send Help, starring Rachel McAdams and Dylan O'Brien. The film was released in theatres by 20th Century Studios on January 30, 2026.

=== Television ===
In addition to film, Raimi has worked in television, producing such series as Hercules: The Legendary Journeys and its spin-off Xena: Warrior Princess, both featuring his younger brother Ted Raimi and long-time friend Bruce Campbell, American Gothic, Cleopatra 2525, M.A.N.T.I.S., 13: Fear Is Real, Young Hercules, and Jack of All Trades. In 2008, Raimi executive-produced a syndicated TV series called Legend of the Seeker, based on Terry Goodkind's best-selling The Sword of Truth fantasy series. He also executive produced the Starz original television series Spartacus: Blood and Sand, Spartacus: Gods of the Arena, Spartacus: Vengeance and Spartacus: War of the Damned. He directed the pilot episode of Ash vs Evil Dead for Starz.

== Personal life ==
In 1993, Raimi married Gillian Greene, the daughter of Canadian actor Lorne Greene. They have five children; their three eldest, daughter Emma Rose and sons Lorne and Henry, appeared as extras in Drag Me to Hell and during the final battle in Spider-Man 3. Greene filed for divorce on May 8, 2024, citing irreconcilable differences. His daughter, Emma Raimi appeared in his 2026 film, Send Help.

=== Political donations ===
In 1995, Raimi donated $450 to the campaign of then-Republican Senator Arlen Specter. In 2002, he donated $1,000 to Democratic Senator Barbara Boxer. During the 2004 election cycle, Raimi donated $1,000 to Republican President George W. Bush. Most recently, Raimi donated $2,950 to Hillary Clinton's campaign early in the 2016 election cycle.

== Filmography ==
=== Film ===
Year	Title	Director	Writer	Producer	Notes
1978	It's Murder!	Yes	Yes	Yes	Amateur film; also uncredited editor and sound mixer
1981	The Evil Dead	Yes	Yes	Executive	
1985	Crimewave	Yes	Yes	No	
1987	Evil Dead II	Yes	Yes	No	
1989	Easy Wheels	No	Yes	No	Credited as "Celia Abrams"
1990	Darkman	Yes	Yes	Executive	
1992	The Nutt House	No	Yes	No	Credited as "Alan Smithee Jr."
1992	Army of Darkness	Yes	Yes	No	Also editor (credited as "R.O.C. Sandstorm")
1994	The Hudsucker Proxy	2nd unit	Yes	No	
1995	The Quick and the Dead	Yes	No	No	
1998	A Simple Plan	Yes	No	No	
1999	For Love of the Game	Yes	No	No	
2000	The Gift	Yes	No	No	
2002	Spider-Man	Yes	No	No	
2004	Spider-Man 2	Yes	No	No	
2005	Man with the Screaming Brain	No	Story	No	Credited as "R.O.C. Sandstorm"
2007	Spider-Man 3	Yes	Yes	No	
2009	Drag Me to Hell	Yes	Yes	No	
2013	Oz the Great and Powerful	Yes	No	No	
2022	Doctor Strange in the Multiverse of Madness	Yes	No	No	
2026	Send Help	Yes	No	Yes	

Producer only
Year	Title	Director
1994	Timecop	Peter Hyams
2004	The Grudge	Takashi Shimizu
2005	Boogeyman	Stephen T. Kay
2006	The Grudge 2	Takashi Shimizu
2007	The Messengers	The Pang Brothers
2007	30 Days of Night	David Slade
2012	The Possession	Ole Bornedal
2013	Evil Dead	Fede Álvarez
2014	Murder of a Cat	Gillian Greene
2015	Poltergeist	Gil Kenan
2016	Don't Breathe	Fede Álvarez
2019	Crawl	Alexandre Aja
2020	The Grudge	Nicolas Pesce
2021	The Unholy	Evan Spiliotopoulos
2021	Don't Breathe 2	Rodo Sayagues
2021	Nightbooks	David Yarovesky
2022	Umma	Iris K. Shim
2023	65	Scott Beck; Bryan Woods
2023	Boy Kills World	Moritz Mohr
2024	Don't Move	Adam Schindler; Brian Netto
2025	Locked	David Yarovesky
2026	Evil Dead Burn	Sébastien Vaniček
2027	Crawl 2	Alexandre Aja
2028	Evil Dead Wrath	Francis Galluppi

Executive producer only
Year	Title	Director	Notes
1989	The Dead Next Door	J. R. Bookwalter	
1991	Lunatics: A Love Story	Josh Becker	
1993	Hard Target	John Woo	
1995	Darkman II: The Return of Durant	Bradford May	Direct-to-video
1996	Darkman III: Die Darkman Die	Bradford May	Direct-to-video
1998	Hercules and Xena – The Animated Movie: The Battle for Mount Olympus	Lynne Naylor	Direct-to-video
1998	Young Hercules	T. J. Scott	Direct-to-video
2002	Xena: Warrior Princess – A Friend in Need	Robert G. Tapert	Direct-to-video
2007	Rise: Blood Hunter	Sebastian Gutiérrez	
2023	Evil Dead Rise	Lee Cronin	

Acting roles
Year	Title	Role	Notes
1978	It's Murder!	Uncle Jasper	
1981	The Evil Dead	Hitchhiker	Uncredited
1983	Hefty's	Cook No. 2	
1985	Spies Like Us	Drive-in guard No. 2	
1987	Evil Dead II	Knight hailing Ash	Uncredited
1987	Thou Shalt Not Kill... Except	Cult leader	
1988	Maniac Cop	News Reporter	
1989	Intruder	Randy	
1990	Miller's Crossing	Snickering Gunman	
1990	Maniac Cop 2	Newscaster	
1992	Innocent Blood	Roma Meats Man	
1992	Army of Darkness	Knight in Sweatshirt and Sneakers	Uncredited
1993	Indian Summer	Stick Coder	
1993	Body Bags	Dead Bill	Segment: "The Gas Station"
1994	The Hudsucker Proxy	Hudsucker Brainstormer	
1994	The Flintstones	Cliff Vandercave Look-A-Like	
1995	Galaxis	Nervous Official	
2002	Spider-Man	Popcorn-Throwing Wrestling Fan	Offscreen
2009	Drag Me to Hell	Ghost at Seance	Uncredited
2013	3 Geezers!	Sam	
2016	The Jungle Book	Giant Squirrel	Voice role

=== Short film ===
Year	Title	Director	Writer	Producer	Notes
1972	Out West	Yes	Yes	No	Also cinematographer
1975	The Great Bogus Monkey Pignuts Swindle	Yes	No	No	
1976	Uncivil War Birds	Yes	No	No	
1976	The James R. Hoffa Story, Part II	Yes	No	No	
1976	Mystery No Mystery	Yes	No	No	
1976	Attack of the Pillsbury Doughboy	Yes	No	No	
1977	The Happy Valley Kid	Yes	No	No	
1977	Six Months to Live	Yes	No	No	
1977	Picnic	Yes	No	No	
1977	Civil War Part II	Yes	No	No	
1979	Clockwork	Yes	Yes	Yes	
1979	William Shakespeare: The Movie	Yes	No	No	
1979	Within the Woods	Yes	Yes	Executive	Also editor
1985	The Sappy Sap	Yes	No	No	
2017	The Black Ghiandola	Yes	No	No	

Acting roles
Year	Title	Role
1978	Attack of the Helping Hand	Milk Man
1978	Shemp Eats the Moon	Angelo the Knife
1982	Cleveland Smith: Bounty Hunter	Nazi

=== Television ===
Year	Title	Director	Writer	Executive Producer	Creator	Notes
1994–1997	M.A.N.T.I.S.	No	Story	Yes	Yes	Wrote story for "Pilot"
1995–2001	Xena: Warrior Princess	No	No	Yes	Developer	
1997	Spy Game	No	No	Yes	Yes	
2008–2010	Legend of the Seeker	No	No	Yes	Yes	
2014	Rake	Yes	No	Yes	No	2 episodes
2015–2018	Ash vs Evil Dead	Yes	Yes	Yes	Developer	Wrote and directed episode: "El Jefe"
2020	50 States of Fright	Yes	Yes	Yes	No	3 episodes

Executive producer only
Year	Title	Notes
1994	Hercules and the Lost Kingdom	TV movie
1994	Hercules and the Circle of Fire	TV movie
1994	Hercules in the Underworld	TV movie
1994	Hercules in the Maze of the Minotaur	TV movie
1995–1996	American Gothic	
1995–1999	Hercules: The Legendary Journeys	
1998–1999	Young Hercules	
2000	Jack of All Trades	
2000–2001	Cleopatra 2525	
2009	13: Fear Is Real	
2010	Zombie Roadkill	
2011	Spartacus: Gods of the Arena	
2013	Spartacus: War of the Damned	

Acting roles
Year	Title	Role	Notes
1993	Journey to the Center of the Earth	Collins	TV movie
1994	The Stand	Bobby Terry	Miniseries
1997	The Shining	Gas Station Howie	Miniseries

== Awards and nominations ==
Year	Association	Category	Work	Result	Ref.
1982	Sitges Film Festival	International Critics' Award	The Evil Dead	Won	
1990	Sitges Film Festival	Best Director	Darkman	Won	
1992	Sitges Film Festival	Honorary Time Machine Award	—N/a	Won	
1992	Brussels International Fantastic Film Festival	Golden Raven	Army of Darkness	Won	
1992	Avoriaz International Fantastic Film Festival	Grand Prize	Army of Darkness	Nominated	
1992	Fantasporto	Critics Award	Army of Darkness	Won	
1999	Cognac Festival du Film Policier	Special Jury Prize	A Simple Plan	Won	
2001	Saturn Awards	The George Pal Memorial Award	—N/a	Honored	
2003	Saturn Awards	Best Director	Spider-Man	Nominated	
2005	Empire Awards	Best Director	Spider-Man 2	Won	
2005	Saturn Awards	Best Director	Spider-Man 2	Won	
2007	Scream Awards	Best Director	Spider-Man 3	Nominated	
2008	Saturn Awards	Best Director	Spider-Man 3	—N/a	
2014	Comic-Con	Inkpot Award	—N/a	Honored	
2016	Motion Picture Sound Editors	Filmmaker Award	—N/a	Honored	

== See also ==
- Sam Raimi's unrealized projects
