= Easy Wheels =

1989 film

- Film poster
- Directed by: David O'Malley
- Written by: Ivan Raimi; Celia Abrams; David O'Malley
- Produced by: Dimitri Villard; Robby Wald; Rob Tapert
- Starring: Paul LeMat; Eileen Davidson; Marjorie Bransfield; Barry Livingston; George Plimpton
- Cinematography: James Lemmo
- Edited by: John Currin
- Music by: John Ross
- Production company: New Star Entertainment
- Distributed by: Fries Entertainment
- Release date: September 29, 1989
- Running time: 94 minutes
- Country: United States
- Language: English

Easy Wheels is a 1989 American comedy film directed by David O'Malley and written by Ivan Raimi, Sam Raimi (credited as Celia Abrams, the name of his mother), and O'Malley.

== Plot ==
The story is a satire of the outlaw biker film genre. It follows two biker gangs, one male and one female.

The male biker gang are the "Born Losers". They are good guys with three missions in life: Find the evil, Destroy the evil, and find a really great lite beer. Their leader, played by Paul LeMat, has visions because of a steel plate in his head. He is being studied by one of his fellow bikers from MIT.

The female biker gang are the "Women of the Wolf". Their leader, played by Eileen Davidson, was abandoned by her parents and raised by wolves. She plans to create a new generation of fearless independent women by kidnapping baby girls and taking them to the woods to be raised by wolves. Male babies are sold on the black market.

In the inevitable clash, the leader of the "Woman of the Wolf" must choose between the attraction she feels for the leader of the Born Losers, and the culmination of her allegedly feminist ideals.

Mark Holton also appeared in the film.
