= The Last House in the Woods =

The Last House in the Woods, also Il bosco fuori
- Directed by: Gabriele Albanesi
- Produced by: Gregory J. Rossi
- Starring: Daniela Virgilio; Daniele Grasseti; Gennaro Diana
- Distributed by: Lionsgate; Ghost House Underground
- Release date: 6 August 2006
- Running time: 85 minutes
- Country: Italy
- Language: Italian

The Last House in the Woods (Italian: Il bosco fuori) is a 2006 Italian horror film, which was directed by Gabriele Albanesi and stars Daniela Virgilio, Daniele Grasseti and Gennaro Diana.

== Plot ==
A young couple gets beat up by some aggressive young men. They are saved by a seemingly nice older couple who take them back to their house for shelter. While there, the wounded woman begins to realize that some evil things are occurring within the "Last House in the Woods".

== Release ==
The film premiered on 6 October 2006 at Ravenna Nightmare Film Festival. It was distributed only on DVD in the United States by Ghost House Underground, a division of Ghost House Pictures (Sam Raimi). The Unrated DVD was released on 24 August 2007 and contains different material that is not included in the theatrical version.
