= Roque Baños =

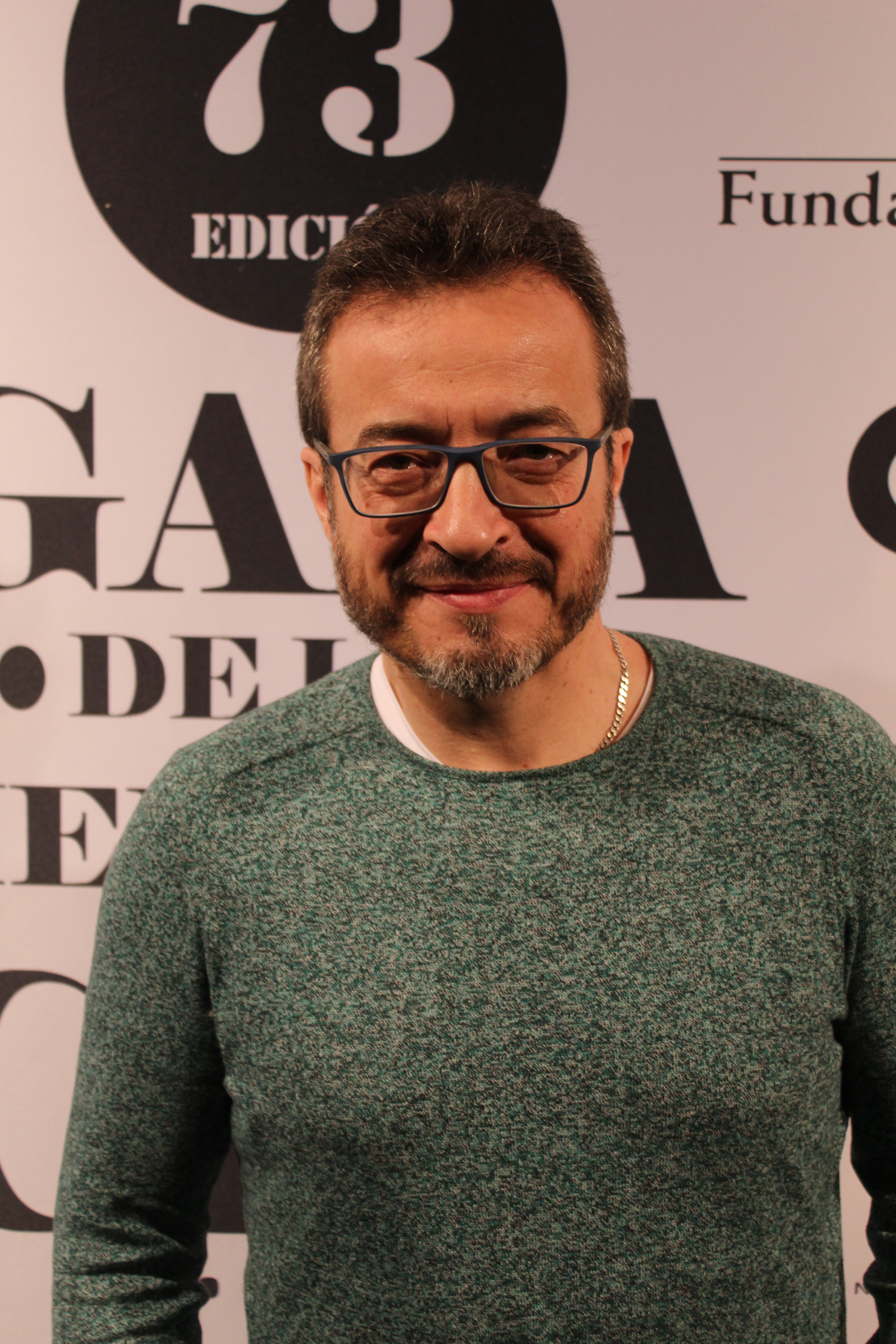
- Baños in 2018, at the 73rd Premios CEC awards ceremony

Background information
- Born: Roque Baños López; Jumilla, Murcia, Spain
- Genres: Jazz, film music
- Occupations: Composer, conductor
- Instrument: Saxophone
- Website: www.roquebanos.es

Roque Baños López is a Spanish music composer. Baños graduated from Boston's Berklee College of Music in 1995 and has since scored both Spanish and English-language films. He has received numerous awards for his compositional work, including the Spanish Goya Award for Best Original Score in both 2008 and 2009.

== Early life and education ==
Born in Jumilla, Baños has been involved in music his whole life, his father being a saxophonist, and he himself completed a basic saxophone degree at the Upper Music Conservatory of Murcia. In 1986, Baños moved to Madrid where he attended the Real Conservatorio Superior and continued his musical studies, obtaining professional degrees in the saxophone, piano, harmony, counterpoint, composition, instrumentation and conducting. In 1993 he received a grant from the Ministry of Culture to study at the prestigious Berklee College of Music, and it was as a student at Berklee that he would develop his aspirations to compose film scores and jazz.

== Professional career ==
Although Baños initially developed his skills as a concert musician, he soon decided to focus on composition. His approach to film music is due to his education at the Berklee College of Music in Boston, USA. There, he studied music composition with David Spear and orchestral direction with Gregory Fridge, specializing in composition for film scores and jazz, winning several awards, among them the Robert Share Award for showing the highest dramatic level in the area of film score. He graduated with summa cum laude in the branches of film score and jazz composition.

Back in Spain, after a brief period in the short film scene, he began to compose for the big screen thanks to actor Gabino Diego. Since then he has composed many works along with fellow Spanish composer Alberto Iglesias.

In 2008, he received the Goya Award for Best Original Score for the soundtrack of Las 13 rosas.

He scored an English-language major studio film for the first time with the 2013 horror film Evil Dead.

== Musical influences ==
His music is notable for a great jazz influence, as showed in the majority of his works and especially in El robo más grande jamás contado (The Biggest Robbery Never Told).

== Filmography ==
English language

Key
†	Denotes films that have not yet been released

Year	Title	Director(s)	Notes
2000	Sexy Beast	Jonathan Glazer	
2004	The Machinist	Brad Anderson	
2008	The Oxford Murders	Álex de la Iglesia	
2013	Evil Dead	Fede Álvarez	IFMCA Award for Best Original Score for a Fantasy/Science Fiction/Horror Film; Nominated — IFMCA Award for Film Score of the Year; Nominated — Fright Meter Award for Best Score
2013	Oldboy	Spike Lee	
2015	Regression	Alejandro Amenábar	
2015	In the Heart of the Sea	Ron Howard	
2016	Risen	Kevin Reynolds	
2016	Don't Breathe	Fede Álvarez	
2018	The Commuter	Jaume Collet-Serra	
2018	The Miracle Season	Sean McNamara	
2018	The Man Who Killed Don Quixote	Terry Gilliam	Nominated — Goya Award for Best Original Song (Shared with Tessy Díez)
2018	The Girl in the Spider's Web	Fede Álvarez	
2020	Come Play	Jacob Chase	
2020	His House	Remi Weekes	
2021	Don't Breathe 2	Rodo Sayagues	
2022	Umma	Iris K. Shim	
2024	The Killer's Game	J. J. Perry	
2025	Bone Lake	Mercedes Bryce Morgan	
2025	Afterburn	J. J. Perry	

Spanish language

- Carreteras secundarias (1997)
- No se lo digas a nadie (1998)
- Una pareja perfecta (1998)
- Torrente, el brazo tonto de la ley (1998)
- Muertos de risa (1998)
- Segunda piel (1999)
- Goya en Burdeos (1999)
- El corazón del guerrero (1999)
- El árbol del penitente (1999)
- Tuno negro (2000)
- Obra maestra (2000)
- Lázaro de Tormes (2000)
- La Comunidad (2000)
- Torrente 2, misión en Marbella (2001)
- No somos nadie (2001)
- No debes estar aquí (2001)
- Chica de Río (2001)
- Salomé (2002)
- El robo más grande jamás contado (2002)
- El otro lado de la cama (2002)
- Deseo (2002)
- 800 balas (2002)
- El maquinista (2003)
- La Flaqueza del Bolchevique (2003)
- Isi/Disi. Amor a lo bestia (2004)
- El séptimo día (2004)
- Crimen Ferpecto (2004)
- Torrente 3: El protector (2005)
- Rosario Tijeras (2005)
- Frágiles (2005)
- La caja Kovak (2006)
- Alatriste (2006)
- Las 13 rosas (2007)
- Diario de una ninfómana (2008)
- Celda 211 (2009)
- Rosa y negro (2009)
- 7 Minutos (2009)
- Balada triste de trompeta (2010)
- Torrente 4: Lethal Crisis (2011)
- Ocho apellidos catalanes (2015)
- Padre no hay más que uno (2019)
- Adú (2020)
