= Jane Levy =

American actress (born 1989)

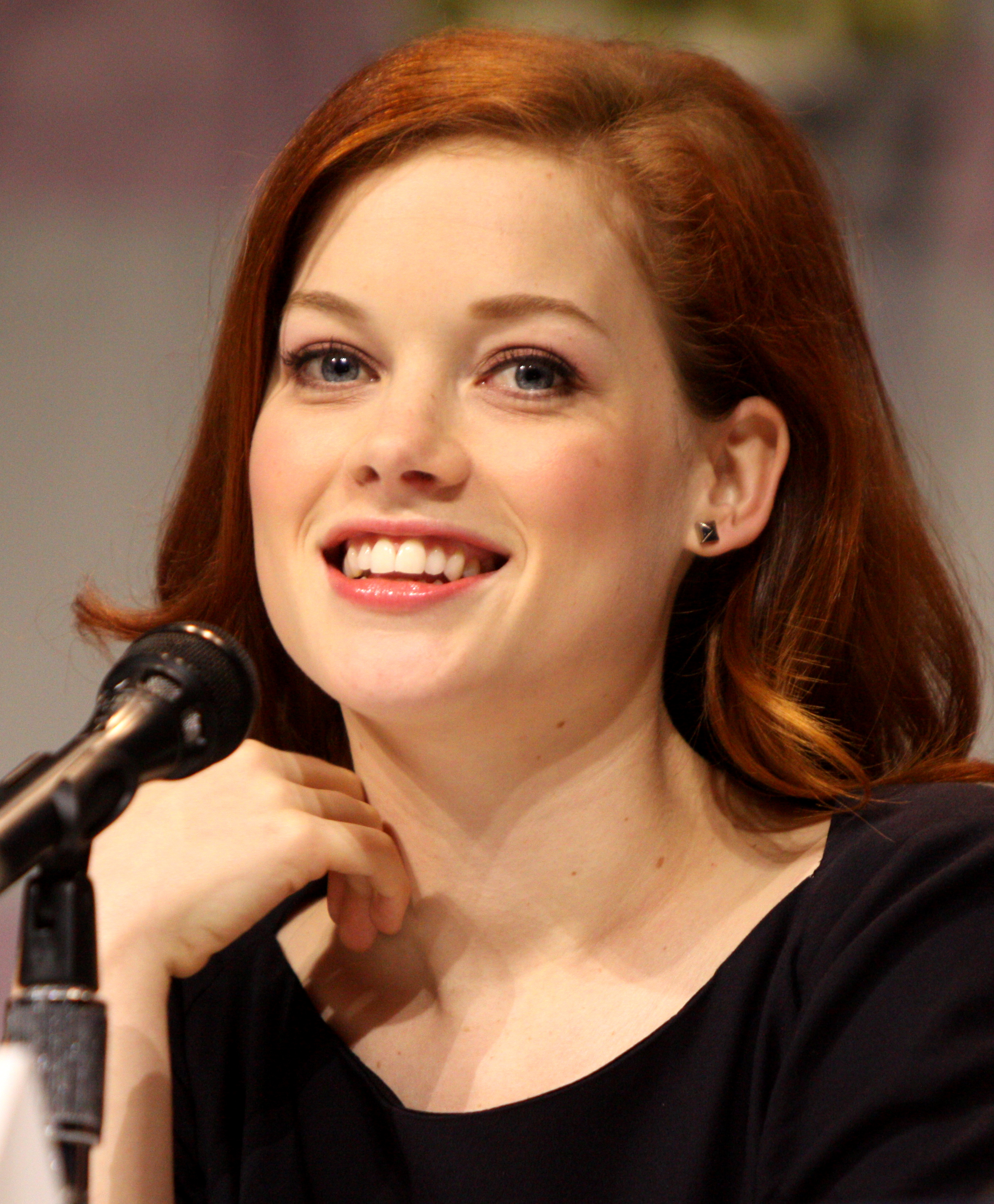
- Levy in 2013
- Born: Jane Colburn Levy; December 29, 1989 (age 36); Santa Monica, California, U.S.
- Education: Stella Adler Studio of Acting
- Occupation: Actress
- Years active: 2010–present
- Spouse: Jaime Freitas (m. 2011; div. 2013)
- Partner: Thomas McDonell (2011–present)
- Children: 1

Jane Colburn Levy (Note: Pronunciation: /ˈliːvi/, LEE-vee; Levy said her own name near the end of an interview on Today, broadcast on January 4, 2021. Asked about any relationship to the actors Dan and Eugene Levy, she said, "My last name is LEE-vee, theirs is LEV-ee".) (born December 29, 1989) is an American actress. After attending the Stella Adler Studio of Acting, she debuted as the original Mandy Milkovich on the Showtime comedy-drama Shameless (2011). Levy left Shameless following its first season to portray the lead of the ABC sitcom Suburgatory from 2011 to 2014.

Transitioning to film, Levy collaborated with director Fede Álvarez as the lead of the horror films Evil Dead (2013) and Don't Breathe (2016). She returned to television with series regular roles on the Hulu comedy-drama There's... Johnny! (2017) and horror fantasy Castle Rock (2018), in addition to headlining the Netflix thriller miniseries What/If (2019). From 2020 to 2021, Levy portrayed the title character of the NBC musical comedy-drama Zoey's Extraordinary Playlist, for which she received a Golden Globe nomination for Best Actress – Television Series Musical or Comedy.

== Early life and education ==
Jane Colburn Levy was born on December 29, 1989 in Santa Monica, California, the second child of Mary (née Tilbury), an artist and florist, and Lester Levy, a musician turned mediator. When Levy was an infant, her family relocated to northern California, settling in San Anselmo, where she was raised. Her father is Jewish, and her mother is of English, Scottish, and Irish descent. She has one elder brother, Simon. She attended Sir Francis Drake High School, where she was on the hip hop dancing team and was captain of the soccer team; she began playing soccer at age five.

Levy attended Goucher College in Baltimore, Maryland, for one year, where she played on the Division III varsity women's soccer team. After experiencing significant depression during her first year of studies, Levy chose to drop out of Goucher College and instead opted to study acting. She subsequently transferred to the Stella Adler Studio of Acting in New York City, where she graduated from the Conservatory.

== Career ==
=== 2010–2015 ===
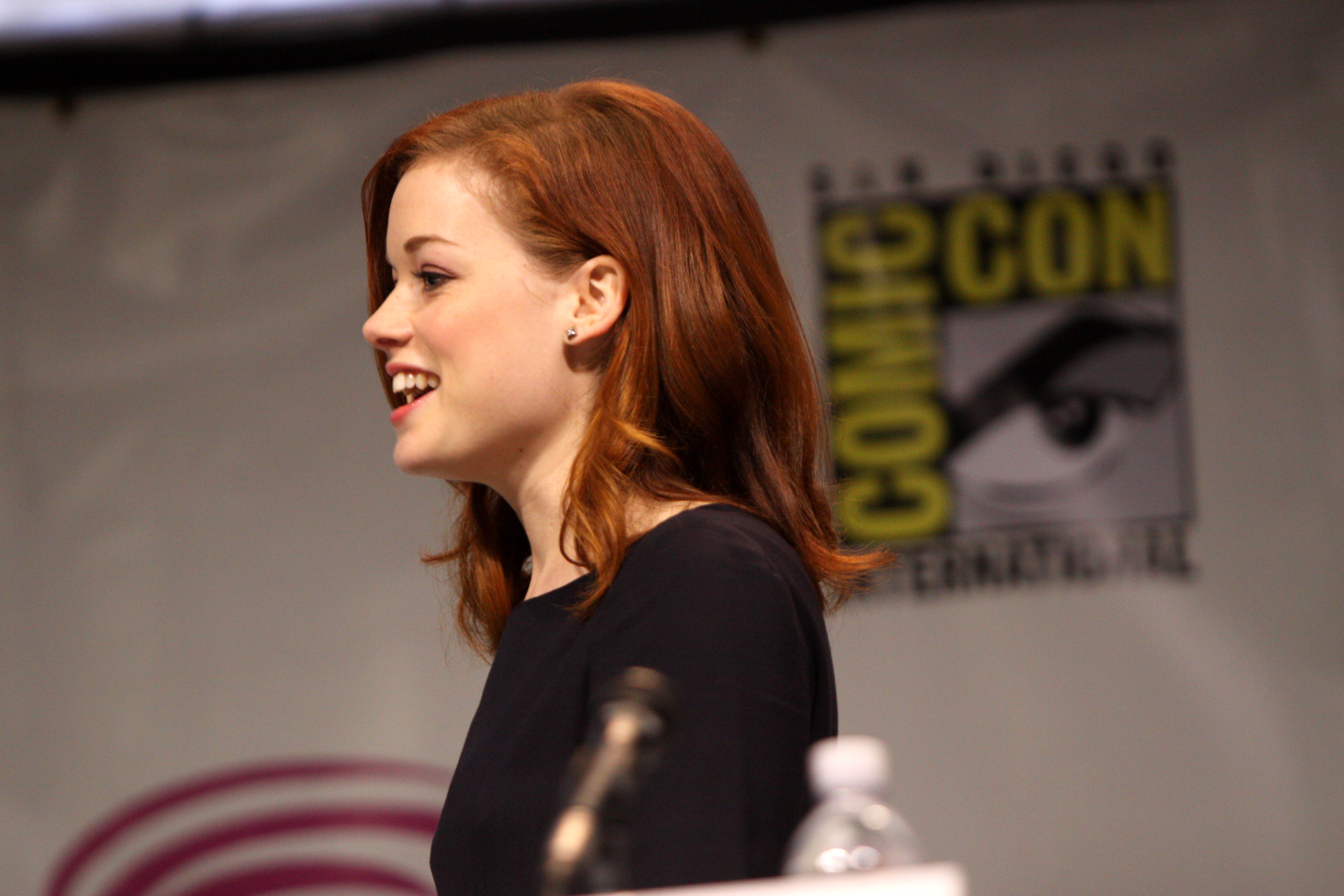
Levy in 2013

Levy moved to Los Angeles after two years in New York City. She played the recurring character Mandy Milkovich, her first TV role, during the first season of the Showtime comedy-drama Shameless in early 2011. In March 2011, she landed the first lead role of her career on the sitcom Suburgatory, with Jeremy Sisto and Cheryl Hines, resulting in Emma Greenwell replacing Levy in her Shameless role for season 2 onward. On May 9, 2014, Suburgatory was canceled by ABC after three seasons.

Levy was named by both TV Guide and TheInsider.com as one of the breakout stars of 2011, and was included on the top eleven list of funniest women compiled by AOL. Forbes named her as one of the handful of entertainment stars on their list of 30 under 30 who are "reinventing the world" (a list of the brightest stars of the future). Noting that Suburgatory was "one of the big hits of the new [TV] season" and that Levy would be seen in two upcoming films, Forbes called her "one to watch".

Levy appeared in two films in 2012: Fun Size, the first feature from Gossip Girl creator Josh Schwartz, and Nobody Walks directed by Ry Russo-Young and written by Lena Dunham. Levy later starred in the 2013 remake of the horror classic The Evil Dead, as the drug-dependent Mia, replacing Lily Collins, who had originally been cast. The following year, she starred in two independent films, About Alex and Bang Bang Baby. In 2015, Levy co-starred opposite Rene Russo and Oliver Platt in Frank and Cindy.

=== 2016–present ===
In 2016, Levy teamed up again with Evil Dead director Fede Álvarez, starring in horror film Don't Breathe, which tells the story of three friends breaking into the house of a wealthy blind man. A sleeper hit, Don't Breathe received critical acclaim and grossed over $156 million. That same year, she starred with Lucas Till in Monster Trucks, Paramount Animation's first live-action/CGI film, directed by Ice Age's Chris Wedge.

In 2017, Levy appeared as Dez in I Don't Feel at Home in This World Anymore directed by Macon Blair, and as Elizabeth in an episode of Showtime series Twin Peaks. In November 2017, Levy starred in Hulu's There's...Johnny! as Joy Greenfield, the female lead. That year, Levy also co-starred with Glenn Close in the Amazon pilot Sea Oak, written by George Saunders and directed by Hiro Murai.

In 2018, Levy appeared in Sony Crackle's zombie comedy Office Uprising, and starred as Jackie Torrance, niece of Stephen King's Jack Torrance, in Hulu's critically acclaimed Castle Rock, also inspired by King's work. Levy starred in Mike Kelley's Netflix thriller miniseries What/If alongside Renée Zellweger and Blake Jenner. She appeared in James Franco's romantic drama Pretenders as Catherine, the female lead. From 2020 to 2021, she starred as the titular character in Zoey's Extraordinary Playlist from NBC, which ran for two seasons.

== Personal life ==
On March 3, 2011, Levy married actor Jaime Freitas. According to court documents, the couple separated on October 31, 2011. In April 2013, Levy filed for divorce, citing irreconcilable differences.

Levy has been in a relationship with actor and artist Thomas McDonell since they met on the set of the film Fun Size in 2011. They have a son named Desmond, born in 2024.

== Filmography ==
Key
†	Denotes films that have not yet been released

=== Film ===
Year	Title	Role	Director(s)	Notes	Ref.
2012	Nobody Walks	Caroline	Ry Russo-Young		
2012	Fun Size	April Martin-Danzinger-Ross	Josh Schwartz		
2013	Evil Dead	Mia Allen	Fede Álvarez		
2014	About Alex	Kate	Jesse Zwick		
2014	Bang Bang Baby	Stepphy Holiday	Jeffrey St. Jules		
2015	Nicholas & Hillary	Hillary	Elizabeth Orr	Short film	
2015	Here Now	Mel	Gregg Araki	Short film	
2015	Frank and Cindy	Kate	G.J. Echternkamp		
2016	Don't Breathe	Rocky	Fede Álvarez		
2016	Monster Trucks	Meredith	Chris Wedge		
2017	I Don't Feel at Home in This World Anymore	Dez	Macon Blair		
2018	Office Uprising	Samantha	Lin Oeding		
2018	Pretenders	Catherine	James Franco		
2023	A Little Prayer	Tammy	Angus MacLachlan		
2023	The Toxic Avenger	Cheerful Insurance Rep	Macon Blair	Voice	
2023	The Problem with People	Natalya	Chris Cottam		
2025	Atropia	Nancy	Hailey Gates		
2026	River	Lucy	Joshua Giuliano		
2026	Whalefall	Eva Gardiner	Brian Duffield		

=== Television ===
Year	Title	Role	Notes	Ref.
2011	Shameless	Mandy Milkovich	5 episodes	
2011–2014	Suburgatory	Tessa Altman	Main cast; 57 episodes	
2014	Kroll Show	Madison	Episode: "Krolling Around with Nick Klown"	
2016	Swedish Dicks	Taylor Slow / Ruth	Episode: "Howl Like a Big Dog"	
2017	Twin Peaks	Elizabeth	Episode: "Part 5"	
2017	Sea Oak	Min	Television film	
2017	There's... Johnny!	Joy Greenfield	Main cast; 7 episodes	
2018	Castle Rock	Diane "Jackie" Torrance	Main cast; 10 episodes	
2019	What/If	Lisa Donovan	Main cast; 10 episodes	
2020–2021	Zoey's Extraordinary Playlist	Zoey Clarke	Main cast; 25 episodes	
2021	Zoey's Extraordinary Christmas	Zoey Clarke	Television film	
2023	Dave	Brittany Parker	Episode: "Harrison Ave"	

== Awards and nominations ==
Year	Award	Category	Work	Result	Ref.
2021	Golden Globe Awards	Best Actress – Television Series Musical or Comedy	Zoey's Extraordinary Playlist	Nominated	
2021	Hollywood Critics Association TV Awards	Best Actress in a Broadcast Network or Cable Series, Comedy	Zoey's Extraordinary Playlist	Won	
2025	Independent Spirit Awards	Best Supporting Performance	A Little Prayer	Nominated	
