= Office Uprising =

2018 American horror comedy film

- Directed by: Lin Oeding
- Written by: Peter Gamble Robinson; Ian Shorr
- Produced by: Giulia Prenna; William Clevinger; Sean Lydiard; Jim Steele
- Starring: Brenton Thwaites; Jane Levy; Karan Soni; Kurt Fuller; Alan Ritchson; Gregg Henry; Ian Harding; Zachary Levi
- Cinematography: Robert Brinkmann
- Music by: Tim Jones
- Production companies: Mind the Gap Productions; Rumble Riot Pictures
- Distributed by: Sony Crackle
- Release date: July 19, 2018
- Running time: 92 minutes
- Country: United States
- Language: English

Office Uprising is an American horror comedy directed by Lin Oeding and written by Peter Gamble Robinson and Ian Shorr that premiered on July 19, 2018, on Sony Crackle. The film stars Brenton Thwaites, Jane Levy, Alan Ritchson, Zachary Levi, Karan Soni and Ian Harding.

== Plot ==
Desmond is a slacker who is always late. He works at a corporate office and factory for Ammotech, one of the world's leading weapons manufacturers. His boss, Adam Nusbaum, calls Desmond into his office to discuss a pending company merger and warns him that he needs to do better at work. It appears that some of his colleagues have already been let go. As a result, Desmond and others spend time planning what they will do next.

After attending a company seminar with his friend/crush Samantha, Desmond notices pallet loads of drinks being unpacked in a corridor. He gets called back to Adam's office, where he finds that Adam has killed his coworker. Desmond flees after his spelling and grammar in his report are criticized, and the entire department chases him. Other colleagues started acting aggressively after drinking the new energy drink. When Desmond tries to ring for help, the switchboard refuses to allow him to call out without clearance from a supervisor due to company policy. Desmond sneaks upstairs, finds Samantha working, and stops her from finishing her energy drink. However, at this point, she is already experiencing violent episodes and has to be restrained. Desmond's colleagues from accounting team up with the advertising department, after killing the head of the department, Bob.

Desmond's friend Mourad finds them hiding in a cupboard, and Mourad has not drunk the energy drink. They try to exit the building, but additional security is triggered when they break an external window. They act crazy and make it to the HR department, where they find Edward. Desmond uses the tannoy system to pretend to be Adam and rescue Edward. The four of them create makeshift weapons, fight to CEO Franklin Gantts' office, and demand to know what has been put in the Zolt energy drinks. Franklin tells them that the drink was created to make staff more alert. But this first batch has been altered by a recently fired scientist who held a grudge and has turned the staff violent.

Adam demands that Franklin lift the security on the building so everyone can leave, and his mob breaks into the office, killing Franklin and Edward and announcing that they all want to resign from the company. Adam leads his mob down to the ground level and lifts the security on the building using Franklin's finger for identification. Meanwhile, another colleague, Nicholas, admits that the drink was altered due to deadlines and having to 'make do' on the order. Nicholas says there is an antidote, and Desmond and Mourad head downstairs to get it to cure Samantha, but they are seen on CCTV. A fight ensues, and they distract staff with additional Zolt energy drinks, and Mourad takes some of the cure back to Samantha.

Adam fights Desmond, who taunts him about how little work he has done during his time at the company, and blows him to smithereens with a land mine. Mourad, Samantha, and Desmond shoot the remaining violent employees and run out the front exit of the building. Samantha kisses Desmond, telling him not to wait so long in the future to make a move, and together they watch as emergency services arrive.

== Cast ==
- Brenton Thwaites as Desmond Brimble
- Jane Levy as Samantha
- Karan Soni as Mourad Haryana
- Zachary Levi as Adam Nusbaum
- Kurt Fuller as Lentworth
- Ian Harding as Nicholas Frohm
- Gregg Henry as Franklin Gantt
- Alan Ritchson as Bob
- Sam Daly as Marcus Gantt
- Ashton McClearin as Lisa
- Stephen Oyoung as Joe
- Barry Shabaka Henley as Clarence
- Roger J. Timber as Jerry Solomon
- Mickey Gooch Jr. as Ralph
- Kenneth Choi as Freddy Wong
- Tyron Woodley as Mario
- Travis Berens as Cloud

== Production ==
=== Development ===
On October 26, 2016, it was announced that stunt performer Lin Oeding would direct a zombie film Office Uprising.

=== Filming ===
Principal photography on the film began in early-December 2016 in Alabama.

== Release ==
The film released on Crackle on July 19, 2018.

== See also ==
- The Belko Experiment, a 2016 film with a similar premise
- Mayhem, a 2017 film with a similar premise
