= Cleveland Smith: Bounty Hunter =

1982 American short film

- Directed by: Josh Becker
- Written by: Josh Becker; Scott Spiegel
- Produced by: Scott Spiegel
- Starring: Bruce Campbell; Cheryl Guttridge; Sam Raimi
- Cinematography: Josh Becker; Tim Philo
- Edited by: Josh Becker
- Music by: Filmhaus Music
- Distributed by: Action Pictures
- Release date: 1982
- Running time: Nine minutes
- Language: English

Cleveland Smith: Bounty Hunter (also known as Cleveland Smith: Bounty Hunter: Episode 36) is a 1982 short film written and directed by Josh Becker and starring Bruce Campbell.

== Plot ==
Bruce Campbell plays an Indiana Jones-type explorer named Cleveland Smith, exploring a dark cave and avoiding oncoming boulders, evading chasing Indians and crossing the river in a canoe to escape them. When one of their spears springs a leak in his canoe, he jumps onto a rock that turns out to be a dinosaur, which he also escapes from, only to land in quicksand. When confronted by a nazi (Sam Raimi), Smith hooks his whip on a plane flying low, only to crash into a tree near a native camp, holding Smith's love interest Sally (Cheryl Guttridge) hostage. Smith scares some of the natives off with a ventriloquist dummy, fights off a swordsman and a giant native and finally saves Sally while retrieving a pair of pants known as the "Waders of the Lost Park". Smith falls off a cliff and Sally is captured by the Nazi from before, but springs a trap in the process.

== Cast ==
- Bruce Campbell as Cleveland Smith
- Cheryl Guttridge as Sally
- Sam Raimi as the Nazi

=== Natives ===
- Robert Tapert
- Nathan Allen
- Brian Chambers
- Bill Aaron
- Scott Spiegel
- Bridget Hoffman
- Mark Lyman
- Bart Pierce
- Clay Warnock
- Ted Raimi
- Bruce Jones
