= Ghost House Pictures =

American horror film production company

- Type: Private
- Industry: Film; Television
- Founded: 2002; 24 years ago
- Founders: Sam Raimi; Robert Tapert
- Headquarters: Los Angeles, California, United States
- Key people: Sam Raimi; Robert Tapert
- Divisions: Ghost House Underground

Ghost House Pictures is an American film and television production company founded in 2002 by Sam Raimi and Robert Tapert. It produces horror films such as The Grudge, 30 Days of Night, Drag Me to Hell, Evil Dead and Don't Breathe.

The company was originally formed in 2002 as a joint venture with Senator International to finance the company's motion pictures. Also that year, the company had bought the rights to the graphic novel 30 Days of Night.

== Ghost House Pictures ==
Release date	Film	Director(s)	Budget	Gross	Distributor(s)
October 22, 2004	The Grudge	Takashi Shimizu	$10 million	$187.3 million	Sony Pictures Releasing
February 4, 2005	Boogeyman	Stephen Kay	$20 million	$67.2 million	Sony Pictures Releasing
October 13, 2006	The Grudge 2	Takashi Shimizu	$20 million	$70.7 million	Sony Pictures Releasing
February 2, 2007	The Messengers	Pang brothers	$16 million	$55.1 million	Sony Pictures Releasing
June 1, 2007	Rise: Blood Hunter	Sebastian Gutierrez	—N/a	$2.9 million	Destination Films; Samuel Goldwyn Films
October 19, 2007	30 Days of Night	David Slade	$30 million	$80.3 million	Sony Pictures Releasing
January 8, 2008	Boogeyman 2	Jeff Betancourt	$4.5 million	$1.8 million	Sony Pictures Home Entertainment
January 20, 2009	Boogeyman 3	Gary Jones	—N/a	$156,941	Sony Pictures Home Entertainment
May 12, 2009	The Grudge 3	Toby Wilkins	—N/a	$1.9 million	Sony Pictures Home Entertainment
May 29, 2009	Drag Me to Hell	Sam Raimi	$30 million	$91.4 million	Universal Pictures
July 22, 2009	Messengers 2: The Scarecrow	Martin Barnewitz	—N/a	$1.5 million	Sony Pictures Home Entertainment
October 5, 2010	30 Days of Night: Dark Days	Ben Ketai	—N/a	—N/a	Sony Pictures Home Entertainment
August 31, 2012	The Possession	Ole Bornedal	$14 million	$85.4 million	Lionsgate
April 5, 2013	Evil Dead	Fede Álvarez	$17 million	$97.5 million	Sony Pictures Releasing
May 22, 2015	Poltergeist	Gil Kenan	$35 million	$95.7 million	20th Century Fox
August 26, 2016	Don't Breathe	Fede Álvarez	$9.9 million	$158.9 million	Sony Pictures Releasing
January 3, 2020	The Grudge	Nicolas Pesce	$10 million	$49.5 million	Sony Pictures Releasing
April 2, 2021	The Unholy	Evan Spiliotopoulos	$10 million	$30.8 million	Sony Pictures Releasing
August 13, 2021	Don't Breathe 2	Rodo Sayagues	$15 million	$53.8 million	Sony Pictures Releasing
September 15, 2021	Nightbooks	David Yarovesky	—N/a	—N/a	Netflix
April 21, 2023	Evil Dead Rise	Lee Cronin	$15 million	$146.5 million	Warner Bros. Pictures
July 24, 2026	Evil Dead Burn	Sébastien Vaniček	$20 million	$71.3 million	Warner Bros. Pictures
April 7, 2028	Evil Dead Wrath	Francis Galluppi	—N/a	—N/a	Warner Bros. Pictures
—N/a	Play Dead	Jaume Collet-Serra	—N/a	—N/a	Netflix
—N/a	Watchful Eye	Kris J. Cummins	—N/a	—N/a	Firebrand Media Group
—N/a	99 Nights in the Forest	—N/a	—N/a	—N/a	20th Century Studios
—N/a	Portrait of God	Dylan Clark	—N/a	—N/a	Lionsgate

== Ghost House Underground ==
Release date	Film	Director(s)
June 24, 2008	The Tattooist	Peter Burger
October 14, 2008	Brotherhood of Blood	Peter Scheerer; Michael Roesch
October 14, 2008	Dark Floors	Pete Riski
October 14, 2008	Room 205	Martin Barnewitz
October 14, 2008	The Substitute	Ole Bornedal
October 14, 2008	Trackman	Igor Shavlak
October 14, 2008	The Last House in the Woods	Gabriele Albanesi
October 14, 2008	No Man's Land: The Rise of Reeker	Dave Payne
October 14, 2008	Dance of the Dead	Gregg Bishop
October 6, 2009	Seventh Moon	Eduardo Sánchez
October 6, 2009	Offspring	Andrew van den Houten
October 6, 2009	The Children	Tom Shankland
October 6, 2009	The Thaw	Mark A. Lewis
February 14, 2011	Stag Night	Peter A. Dowling
February 22, 2011	Psych: 9	Andrew Shortell

== Television series ==
Year	Series	Creator(s)	Network
2007	Devil's Trade	Toby Wilkins	Fearnet
2007	30 Days of Night: Blood Trails	Víctor Garcia	Fearnet
2008	30 Days of Night: Dust to Dust	Ben Ketai	Fearnet
2009	13: Fear Is Real	Gunnar Wetterberg	The CW
2010	Zombie Roadkill	Dave Green	Fearnet
2010	The Resistance	Adrian Picardi	Starz

== See also ==
- Renaissance Pictures
- Blumhouse Productions
- Dark Castle Entertainment
- Gold Circle Films
- Platinum Dunes
- Twisted Pictures
- Atomic Monster
