= Ivan Raimi =

American osteopathic physician and screenwriter

- Born: Ivan Mitchell Raimi; June 21, 1956 (age 70); Royal Oak, Michigan, U.S.
- Education: Michigan State University; Des Moines University
- Occupations: Screenwriter; emergency medicine physician
- Relatives: Sam Raimi (brother); Ted Raimi (brother)

Ivan Mitchell Raimi (born June 21, 1956) is an American emergency medicine physician and screenwriter, and an older brother of filmmaker Sam Raimi and actor Ted Raimi. Ivan works as an emergency physician in Chicago, traveling to Los Angeles occasionally to work in Hollywood.

== Early life and education ==
Ivan M. Raimi was born in Royal Oak, Michigan. He is third of five children born to Celia Barbara (née Abrams), who owned lingerie shops, and Leonard Ronald Raimi, who owned home furnishing stores. Ivan was raised in Conservative Judaism, and his ancestors emigrated from Russia and Hungary. His sister remains in Michigan. He is a graduate of Michigan State University and received his medical degree from the Des Moines University medical school in 1984. Raimi then completed an emergency medicine residency at the Southside Medical Center. He is dually board certified by the American Board of Internal Medicine and the American Osteopathic Board of Emergency Medicine.

== Career ==
Raimi sometimes collaborates on projects with brothers Sam Raimi and Ted Raimi, and his work Army of Darkness is the sequel to the horror films The Evil Dead and Evil Dead II. He also co-wrote the comic book adaptation of Army for Dark Horse Comics. His work in the entertainment industry has been sparse due to his primary career as a doctor.

Prior to these successes, Dr. Raimi also contributed to several of the films that his brother Sam had made in his early career. Some of these were amateur efforts produced in suburban Michigan; some of them professional, theatrical efforts like Easy Wheels (though the script was heavily altered from the one the Raimis submitted). They also worked together on The Nutt House, which was, again, heavily altered—so much so that all those who worked on the script used pseudonyms. Raimi was credited as "Alan Smithee, Sr."

Raimi also co-wrote Darkman, a collaboration with Sam which also featured Ted. He created the short-lived television series Spy Game and co-wrote the stories and screenplays for Spider-Man 3 and Drag Me to Hell, both projects directed by Sam Raimi and featuring Ted Raimi.

== Filmography ==
Year	Film	Notes
1989	Easy Wheels	
1990	Darkman	
1992	The Nutt House	Credited as Alan Smithee
1993	Army of Darkness	
1997	Spy Game	TV series; Co-creator
2007	Spider-Man 3	
2009	Drag Me to Hell	
2015-2018	Ash vs Evil Dead	TV series; Developed By
2020	50 States of Fright	TV series; 3 episodes
