= Evil Dead (2013 film) =

Film by Fede Álvarez

- Theatrical release poster
- Directed by: Fede Álvarez
- Screenplay by: Fede Álvarez; Rodo Sayagues
- Based on: The Evil Dead by Sam Raimi
- Produced by: Rob Tapert; Sam Raimi; Bruce Campbell
- Starring: Jane Levy; Shiloh Fernandez; Lou Taylor Pucci; Jessica Lucas; Elizabeth Blackmore
- Cinematography: Aaron Morton
- Edited by: Bryan Shaw
- Music by: Roque Baños
- Production company: Ghost House Pictures
- Distributed by: TriStar Pictures (through Sony Pictures Releasing) (Note: Released through a collaboration with FilmDistrict. Excluding the United Kingdom and France, where distribution is handled by StudioCanal UK and Metropolitan Filmexport, respectively.)
- Release dates: March 8, 2013 (SXSW); April 5, 2013 (United States)
- Running time: 92 minutes
- Country: United States
- Language: English
- Budget: $17 million
- Box office: $97.5 million

Evil Dead is a 2013 American supernatural horror film directed by Fede Álvarez, in his feature directorial debut, who co-wrote the screenplay with Rodo Sayagues. It is a soft reboot and the fourth installment in the Evil Dead film series and stars Jane Levy, Shiloh Fernandez, Lou Taylor Pucci, Jessica Lucas, and Elizabeth Blackmore. The story follows a group of five people under attack by a corpse-animating demonic entity in a remote cabin in the woods.

Talks for a fourth Evil Dead film began in 2004, with original film actor Bruce Campbell about the possibility for a next film in the franchise. The project was officially announced in July 2011, with Ghost House Pictures producing it, Diablo Cody in the process of revising the script, and Fede Álvarez chosen as the director. Much of the cast joined from January to February 2012. Principal photography took place in March 2012 and wrapped in May in New Zealand outside of Auckland, lasting about a month.

Evil Dead had its premiere at South by Southwest on March 8, 2013, and was released in the United States on April 5, by Sony Pictures Releasing through their TriStar Pictures label. The film received mixed reviews from critics and grossed $97 million worldwide against a production budget of $17 million. A fifth installment, titled Evil Dead Rise, was released by Warner Bros. Pictures, on April 21, 2023, while a sixth installment, titled Evil Dead Burn, was co-released by Warner and Sony, on July 10, 2026.

== Plot ==
A young woman in the woods is captured and held hostage in the cellar of a remote cabin, where an old woman recites incantations from a book in the Welsh language. The young woman begs for her mother before revealing her demonic possession. Her father, Harold, sets her ablaze before shooting her dead.

Some time later, David, his girlfriend Natalie, and their dog Grandpa arrive at the cabin, which is his family's holiday home. They reunite with David's estranged younger half-sister, Mia, and their friends, high school teacher Eric and nurse Olivia. They plan to stay in the cabin while Mia overcomes her heroin addiction. Olivia tells David that this isn't Mia's first attempt at quitting, and Eric adds that Mia's last attempt resulted in her relapsing and legally dying before being revived.

David discovers that the cabin had been broken into, finding the cellar littered with rotting animal corpses, a worn double-barrel shotgun, and a book called the Naturom Demonto. Eric reads an incantation from the book, awakening a malevolent force. Mia begins seeing a demonic doppelgänger of herself in the woods and tries to leave using Eric's car, crashing into a nearby swamp, and is chased by the demon. She is trapped by vines that sexually assault her, and she is possessed.

David finds Grandpa beaten to death, and discovers Mia scalding herself in the shower with boiling water. David tries to take Mia to a hospital, but is forced to return to the cabin due to flooded roads. Olivia administers Mia a sedative, knocking her out. Later that night, Mia wounds David with the shotgun and vomits into Olivia's mouth before being locked in the basement by Eric. A now-possessed Olivia mutilates her face and stabs Eric before he bludgeons her to death. Mia lures Natalie into the cellar and bites her hand before slicing her own tongue.

David rescues Natalie, and Eric explains, per the book, that the Taker of Souls must claim five souls to unleash the Abomination. He further explains that to stop Mia, they must purify her by either live burial, dismemberment, or burning. Meanwhile, Natalie's wound becomes infected, causing it to become possessed. She attempts to amputate it with an electric knife, causing a power outage in the cabin. Natalie, now fully possessed, attacks the pair with a nail gun, but David shoots her other arm off; Natalie bleeds to death from her injury.

David begins dousing the cabin in gasoline, but decides to bury Mia instead. He digs a grave but Mia tries to drown him, and Eric is fatally stabbed saving him. David sedates and buries Mia but after hearing her heartbeat stop, digs her back up and attempts to resuscitate her with a homemade defibrillator; bringing her back to life. Furious at being driven out of Mia and so close to being resurrected, the wrathful Taker of Souls is forced to possess the corpse of Eric before attacking David in the cabin when he comes to retrieve his car keys. David shoots a gasoline can, sacrificing himself to defeat the possessed Eric.

With David's death being the fifth claimed soul, blood begins to rain from the sky and the Taker of Souls rises as the Abomination. During the ensuing battle, Mia manages to sever the Abomination's legs with a chainsaw obtained from a tool shed, but it overturns David's Jeep onto her left arm, crushing it in the process. After Mia's hand is torn off while freeing herself, she bisects the Abomination's head and torso with the chainsaw before it sinks back into the ground and the blood rain ceases. An exhausted Mia leaves, unaware the Naturom Demonto is still intact.

In a post-credits scene, an older Ash Williams (the protagonist of the original three Evil Dead films) is seen in shadowed profile. He says his signature catchphrase, "Groovy."

== Cast ==
- Jane Levy as Mia Allen
- Shiloh Fernandez as David Allen
- Lou Taylor Pucci as Eric
- Jessica Lucas as Olivia
- Elizabeth Blackmore as Natalie
- Jim McLarty as Harold
- Phoenix Connolly as Harold's Daughter
- Sian Davis as Old Woman
- Stephen Butterworth as Toothless Redneck
- Karl Willetts as Long Haired Redneck
- Jack Walley as Billy Bob
- Rupert Degas as Demon Voice

Additionally, Bruce Campbell appears uncredited in the post-credits scene as Ash Williams. Briefly reprising their roles from the original film through archival recordings, Bob Dorian voices Professor Raymond Knowby and Ellen Sandweiss voices Cheryl Williams, who warns the main characters that they will die.

== Production ==
=== Writing ===
Fede Álvarez and Rodo Sayagues co-wrote the script, which was then doctored by Diablo Cody in an effort to Americanize the dialogue since English was not the writers' first language. The film was produced by Sam Raimi, Bruce Campbell and Robert G. Tapert, who are the producers of the original Evil Dead trilogy.

Raimi and Campbell had planned a remake for many years, but, in 2009, Campbell stated the proposed remake was "going nowhere" and had "fizzled" due to extremely negative fan reaction. However, in April 2011, Bruce Campbell stated in an AskMeAnything interview on Reddit: "We are remaking Evil Dead. The script is awesome ... The remake's gonna kick some ass — you have my word." The film was officially announced that July.

In November 2018, Álvarez confirmed the film's relationship to the original:

It continues the first one. The coincidences on events between the first film and mine are not coincidences, but more like dark fate created by the evil book. (Ash [sic] car is still there rusting away.)

=== Casting ===
Actor Shiloh Fernandez was cast in the lead male role of David. Initially, Lily Collins was scheduled to play the lead female role of Mia, but dropped out in January 2012, with Jane Levy replacing her the next month. Lou Taylor Pucci, Elizabeth Blackmore, and Jessica Lucas later joined the cast.

=== Filming ===
Álvarez, who also has a background in CGI, also confirmed in an interview that the film does not employ CGI (except for touch-ups): "We didn't do any CGI in the movie ... Everything that you will see is real, which was really demanding. This was a very long shoot, 70 days of shooting at night. There's a reason people use CGI; it's cheaper and faster, I hate that. We researched a lot of magic tricks and illusion tricks."

== Release ==
=== Theatrical ===
TriStar Pictures released the film theatrically on April 5, 2013, in the United States, with Sony Pictures handling other markets. Fede Álvarez tweeted on January 28, 2013, that the film first received an NC-17 rating, which prompted cuts in order to obtain the contractually obligated R-rating. The film has been rated uncut as an 18 by the BBFC for containing strong "bloody violence, gory horror and very strong language". StudioCanal handled the release of Evil Dead in the United Kingdom.

Evil Dead premiered at the SXSW Film Festival in Austin, TX on March 8, 2013. The music for Evil Dead, composed by Roque Baños, was released by La-La Land Records in a 40-minute digital form and a 70-minute physical release, on April 9, 2013.

=== Home media ===
Evil Dead was released on DVD and Blu-ray, on July 16, 2013. The Blu-ray exclusives include commentary from three of the cast, and screenwriters Fede Álvarez and Rodo Sayagues and five featurettes, while the regular DVD includes only three of the featurettes. Shout! Factory released a 4K Ultra HD Blu-ray containing both cuts of the film and an exclusive poster on September 27, 2022 under their Scream Factory sub label.

=== Extended Cut ===
An "extended version" featuring an alternative ending (a deleted mid-credits scene) and various other deleted clips and dialogue, some of which were featured in the original trailer but subsequently removed from the theatrical version, was aired in the UK on Channel 4 on January 25, 2015.

On October 10, 2018, Sony Pictures announced the release of the Unrated Cut on Blu-ray Disc in a two-disc manufacture on demand combo pack with the theatrical version. It was released on October 23, 2018. The extended cut is 96 minutes compared to the 91-minute theatrical cut.

== Reception ==
=== Box office ===
The film grossed $25.8 million in its opening weekend, finishing first at the box office. It went on to gross $54.2 million domestically and $43.3 million internationally, for a worldwide take of $97.5 million against its $17 million budget, making it a box office success.

=== Critical response ===
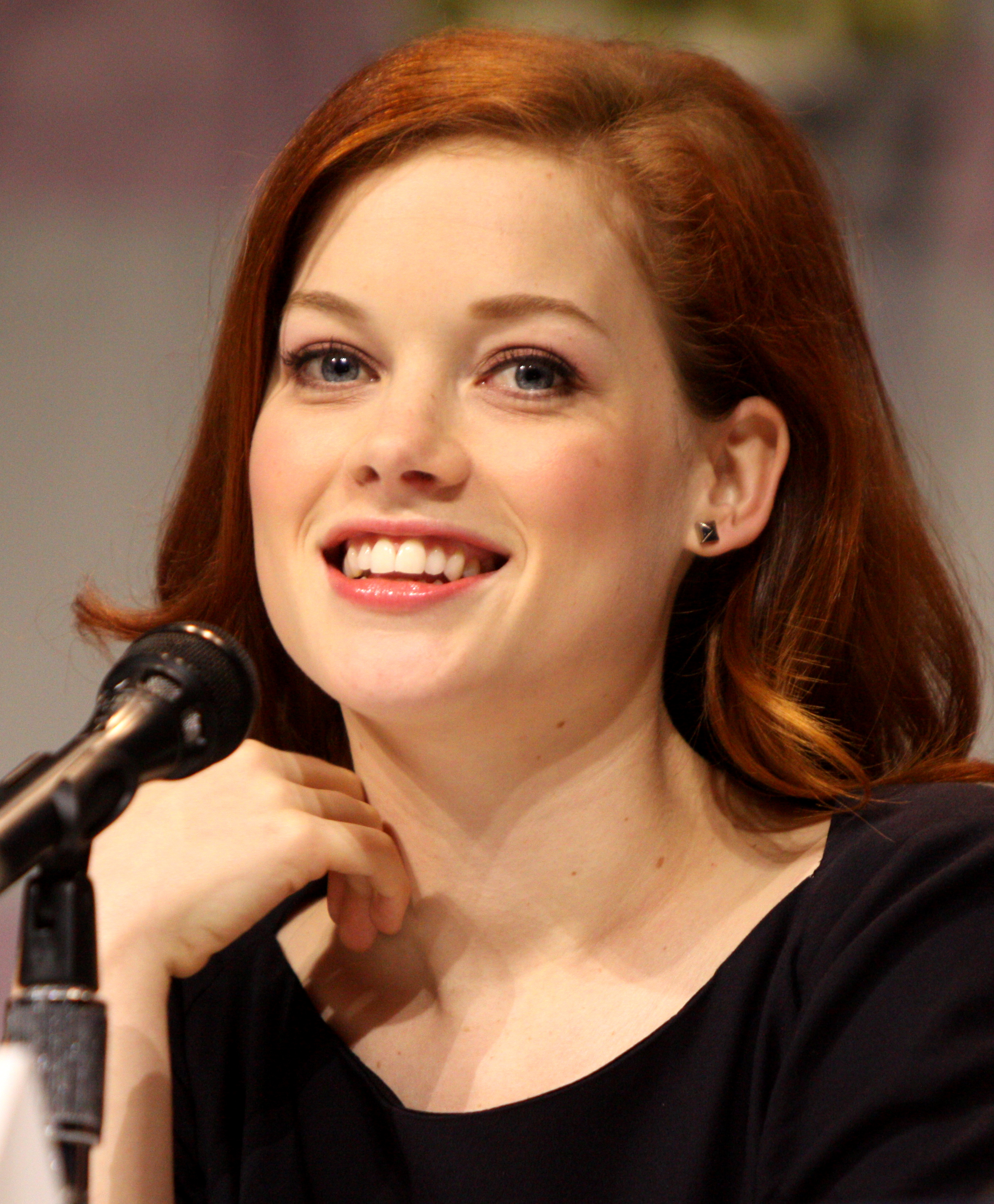
Jane Levy's performance as Mia was widely praised by both critics and audiences alike, commending her portrayals of the addict, the villainous deadite and tormented final girl.

On Rotten Tomatoes, the film has an approval rating of 64% based on 203 reviews and an average rating of 6.2/10. The critics consensus states: "It may lack the absurd humor that underlined the original, but the new-look Evil Dead compensates with brutal terror, gory scares, and gleefully bloody violence." On Metacritic, the film has a weighted average score of 57 out of 100 based on 38 critics, indicating "mixed or average" reviews. Audiences polled by CinemaScore gave the film an average grade of "C+" on an A+ to F scale.

Evan Dickson from Bloody Disgusting reviewed the film at SXSW and went on to say, "Evil Dead is amazingly gory and fun" and gave the film 4/5 stars. Chris Tilly of IGN gave Evil Dead 9/10 and called the movie a "terrifying, exhilarating and relentlessly entertaining new chapter in the Evil Dead story". John DeFore of The Hollywood Reporter also gave the film a positive review, calling it a "remake that will win the hearts of many of the original's fans." Independent horror review site HorrorTalk gave the film four stars out of five, saying it is "the most unrelenting and bloody horror film to come out of a major studio in a very long time". Emma Simmonds of The List commented: "Evil Dead has ample cheap shocks and few bloodcurdling frights but it builds to something gorily bravura and, if that's your bag, you'll come away satisfied. It's a while before anyone picks up a chainsaw, but boy is it worth it when they do." Matt Singer called the film "an assault on the senses" and "a success, one that out-Evil Deads the original movie with even more gore, puke, blood, and dismembered limbs. It may not be wildly inventive, but it is effective, and plenty faithful to the spirit — and tagline — of the first 'Ultimate Experience in Grueling Terror.'"

Richard Roeper rated the film one star out of four, criticizing the film's unoriginality, the characters' lack of intelligence, and the film's reliance on gore for what he felt were cheap scares. He concluded his review by saying: "I love horror films that truly shock, scare and provoke. But after 30 years of this stuff, I'm bored to death and sick to death of movies that seem to have one goal: How can we gross out the audience by torturing nearly every major character in the movie?"

=== Accolades ===
Year	Award	Category	Recipient	Result
2013	Golden Trailer Awards	Best Horror TV Spot	TriStar Pictures and mOcean for "Everything's Fine"	Nominated
2013	Fright Meter Award	Best Makeup	Evil Dead	Won
2013	Fright Meter Award	Best Special Effects	Evil Dead	Won
2013	Fright Meter Award	Best Ensemble Cast	Cast of Evil Dead	Nominated
2013	Fright Meter Award	Best Horror Movie	Evil Dead	Nominated
2013	Fright Meter Award	Best Director	Fede Álvarez	Nominated
2013	Fright Meter Award	Best Actress	Jane Levy	Nominated
2013	Fright Meter Award	Best Supporting Actor	Lou Taylor Pucci	Nominated
2013	Fright Meter Award	Best Score	Roque Baños	Nominated
2013	Fright Meter Award	Best Editing	Bryan Shaw	Nominated
2013	Golden Schmoes Award	Best Horror Movie of the Year	Evil Dead	Runner-up
2013	International Film Music Critics Award	Best Original Score for a Fantasy/Science Fiction/Horror Film	Roque Baños	Won
2013	International Film Music Critics Award	Film Music Composition of the Year	Roque Baños for the composition track "Abominations Rising"	Won
2013	International Film Music Critics Award	Film Score of the Year	Roque Baños	Nominated
2013	IGN Summer Movie Award	Best Horror Movie	Evil Dead	Nominated
2013	Key Art Award	Best Audio/Visual Technique	Screen Gems & mOcean for the trailer "Filthy"	Nominated
2014	Empire Award	Best Horror	Evil Dead	Nominated
2014	Fangoria Chainsaw Award	Best Makeup/Creature FX	Roger Murray; Jane O'Kane	Won
2014	Fangoria Chainsaw Award	Best Wide-Release Film	Fede Álvarez	Runner-up
2014	Fangoria Chainsaw Award	Best Supporting Actor	Lou Taylor Pucci	Runner-up
2014	Fangoria Chainsaw Award	Worst Film	Evil Dead	3rd place
2014	Saturn Award	Best Make-Up	Patrick Baxter; Jane O'Kane; Roger Murray	Nominated

== Sequel ==
In October 2019, Raimi announced at the New York Comic Con, that a new Evil Dead film was officially green-lit and in development, with Robert G. Tapert as producer, while Raimi and Campbell served as executive producers only, all under their Ghost House Pictures banner. In June 2020, Lee Cronin was chosen as a director with a script he wrote. Officially titled Evil Dead Rise, the project was developed by New Line Cinema. Alyssa Sutherland and Lily Sullivan were cast in the film, and filming concluded on October 27, 2021. Evil Dead Rise was theatrically released on April 21, 2023.
