= Rodo Sayagues =

Uruguayan screenwriter and producer

- Occupations: Writer; producer; film director; songwriter
- Years active: 2005–present
- Notable work: Evil Dead; Don't Breathe; Don't Breathe 2; Alien: Romulus

Rodo Sayagues is a Uruguayan writer, producer, film director, and songwriter. He is best known for his work as a co-writer on the Fede Álvarez-directed films Evil Dead (2013), Don't Breathe (2016), and Alien: Romulus (2024), and for directing Don't Breathe 2 (2021).

== Career ==
After writing short films, Sayagues wrote his feature film debut, Evil Dead (2013), which serves as a remake to the 1981 film. He reteamed with Evil Dead director Fede Álvarez to write the 2016 horror film Don't Breathe. On May 3, 2016, Warner Bros. hired Sayagues and Álvarez to co-write the script for Monsterpocalypse. On October 11, 2016, Columbia Pictures acquired the rights to Incognito and hired Sayagues, Daniel Casey and Álvarez to write the screenplay. In July 2017, Sayagues and Álvarez were hired to produce an untitled techno thriller film, with Jason Eisener directing, from a script by Simon Barrett.

In November 2018, Sayagues and Álvarez were brought on board to co-write the sequel to their 2013 film, Evil Dead. In September 2019, Sayagues and Álvarez were hired to co-write the 2022 Texas Chainsaw Massacre sequel. In January 2020, Sayagues was hired to direct and co-write the sequel Don't Breathe 2, making his directorial debut. The film was released on August 13, 2021. In April 2020, Sayagues signed on to produce the Lionsgate zombie film 16 States. In March 2023, it was announced that Sayagues and Álvarez would be co-writing Alien: Romulus (2024).

== Filmography ==
Short film

Year	Title	Writer	Producer	Notes	Ref.
2005	El Cojonudo	Yes	Yes		
2009	Ataque de pánico!	Yes	No	Also actor (Role: Guy at the Phone)	

Feature film

Year	Title	Director	Writer	Co-Producer	Notes	Ref.
2013	Evil Dead	No	Yes	No	Also writer of the song "Baby, Little Baby"	
2016	Don't Breathe	No	Yes	Yes		
2021	Don't Breathe 2	Yes	Yes	Yes	Also electric guitar player in soundtrack	
2022	Texas Chainsaw Massacre	No	Story	Yes		
2024	Alien: Romulus	No	Yes	No		

Other credits

Year	Title	Role	Notes	Ref.
2017	Get the Weed	Executive producer		
2018	The Girl in the Spider's Web	Songwriter	Wrote and produced the song "Theta"	
2021	Calls	Co-executive producer	Also wrote episode "Me, Myself & Darlene"	

== Accolades ==
In 2016, for his work on Don't Breathe, he was nominated at the Fright Meter Awards for "Best Screenplay". In 2022, for his work on Calls, he was nominated at the 74th Writers Guild of America Awards for "Best Short Form New Media – Adapted".
