= Fede Álvarez =

Uruguayan filmmaker (born 1978)

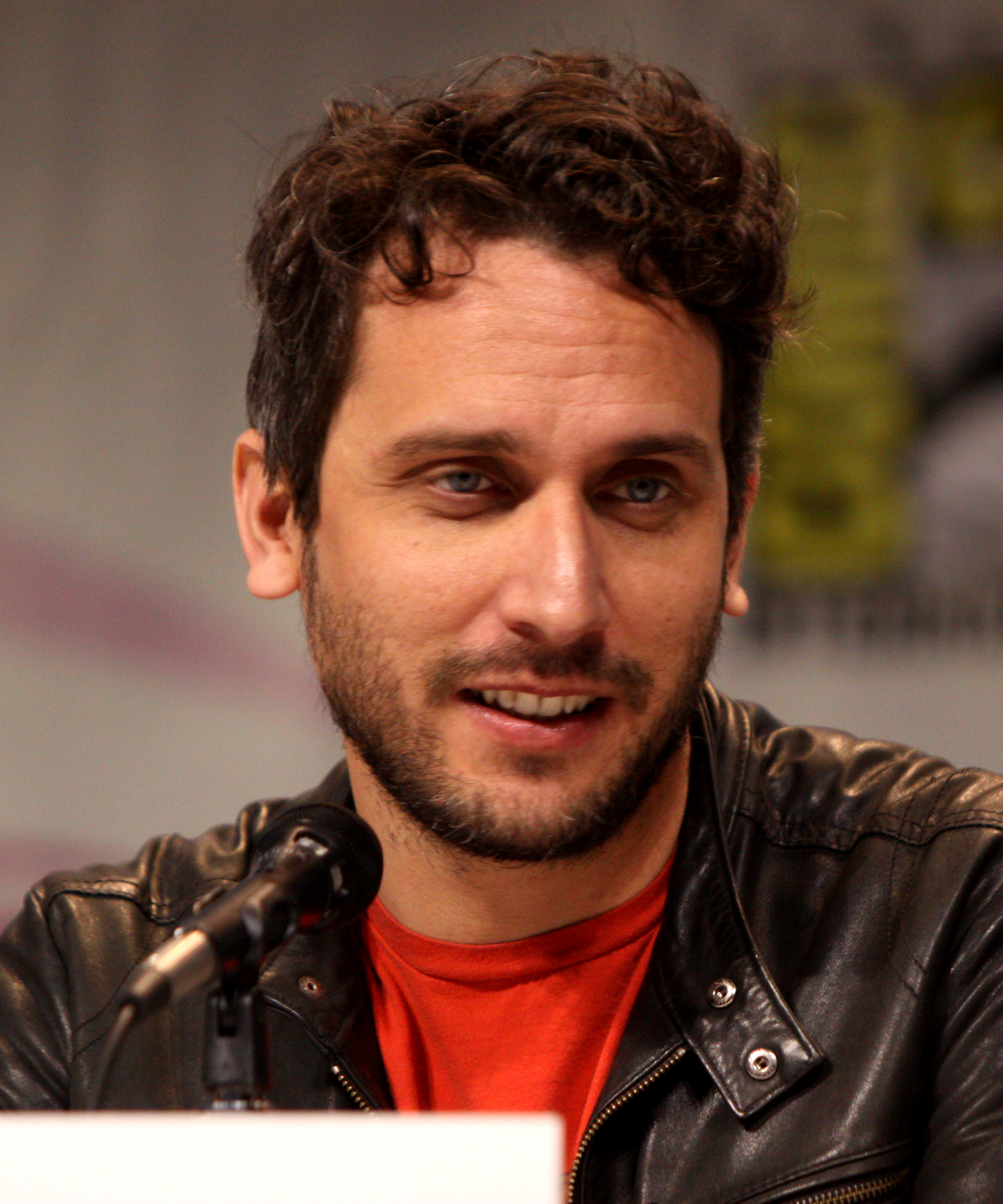
- Álvarez in 2013
- Born: Federico Javier Álvarez Mattos; February 9, 1978 (age 48); Montevideo, Uruguay
- Citizenship: Uruguay; United States
- Occupations: Director; screenwriter; producer
- Years active: 2001–present

Federico Javier Álvarez Mattos (Spanish: [ˈfeðe]; born February 9, 1978) is a Uruguayan filmmaker based in the United States. He is best known for directing the horror films Evil Dead (2013), Don't Breathe (2016), and Alien: Romulus (2024).

== Early life ==
Álvarez was born in Uruguay. He cited viewing Alien when he was a 12-year-old in 1990 as a key experience in his upbringing that subsequently saw him use a VHS camcorder plenty of times in his hometown of Montevideo with his friends. In his twenties, he spent time as a director for commercials.

== Career ==
In 2009, Álvarez released his short film Ataque de Pánico! on YouTube. Before premiering online, the film screened on October 31, 2009, at the Buenos Aires Rojo Sangre film festival. A few weeks later, Álvarez made a deal with Ghost House Pictures to direct a $30–$40 million sci-fi film. His first project with Ghost House ended up being the direction and co-writing of the Evil Dead remake. After the release of Evil Dead, Álvarez stated that he had "had the temptation to do big franchises", but instead directed and co-wrote the relatively low budget horror film Don't Breathe (2016), which received positive reviews. Álvarez later revealed that during this period he was approached by Marvel Studios to direct an unspecified movie; however, he declined, feeling he would have little creative control over it. In 2017, Álvarez teamed up with Good Universe to set up their own production company, Bad Hombre.

Álvarez directed The Girl in the Spider's Web, a reboot of the English-language The Girl with the Dragon Tattoo series, based on the novel of the same name. The film featured an entirely new cast compared to the 2011 film, and it was released on November 9, 2018. In April 2019, Álvarez, alongside Doug Liman, directed reshoots for the 2021 film Chaos Walking, which added an additional $15 million to the film's budget.

In 2021, Álvarez directed all nine episodes of Calls for Apple TV+, a primarily audio-based series with animated visual components. He also co-wrote and co-produced Don't Breathe 2, which was released on August 13, 2021, directed by Rodo Sayagues. In 2024, he wrote and directed Alien: Romulus. Later that year, he presented the Fangoria Chainsaw Awards. Álvarez is writing the script for the sequel to Alien: Romulus but is stepping down as director but will remain as a producer.

=== Unrealized projects ===
Álvarez was attached to direct a live-action adaptation of the video game Dante's Inferno for Universal Pictures in September 2013, however no further updates have been provided since the announcement. In May 2016, Álvarez was attached to direct an adaptation of Monsterpocalypse for Warner Bros. In October 2016, Álvarez was brought on to direct an adaptation of Incognito for Sony Pictures, based on a script by Daniel Casey. Álvarez was considered to replace Ben Affleck as director for The Batman.

On April 13, 2017, Álvarez was confirmed to direct and co-write a spin-off to Labyrinth with Nicole Perlman and Jay Basu. However, in April 2020, Álvarez announced that he had stepped down as director.

== Personal life ==
He is the son of Uruguayan journalist, writer, and professor Luciano Álvarez. He lives in Los Angeles.

He is a fan of Peñarol and has included symbols of the club in films such as Alien: Romulus.

== Filmography ==
=== Feature films ===
Year	Title	Director	Writer	Producer	Notes
2013	Evil Dead	Yes	Yes	No	Also writer of the song "Baby, Little Baby"
2016	Don't Breathe	Yes	Yes	Yes	Also viola soloist in soundtrack
2018	The Girl in the Spider's Web	Yes	Yes	No	
2021	Don't Breathe 2	No	Yes	Yes	
2022	Texas Chainsaw Massacre	No	Story	Yes	
2024	Alien: Romulus	Yes	Yes	Executive	

=== Television ===
Year	Title	Creator	Director	Writer	Executive Producer	Notes
2014	From Dusk till Dawn: The Series	No	Yes	No	No	Episode: "La Conquista"
2021	Calls	Yes	Yes	Yes	Yes	9 episodes, Writer (7 episodes); Voice role as Jesus (1 episodes)

=== Short films ===
Year	Title	Director	Writer	Producer	Editor	Notes
2001	Los Pocillos	Yes	No	No	Yes	
2003	El Último Alevare	Yes	Yes	No	Yes	
2005	El Cojonudo	Yes	Yes	Yes	Yes	
2009	Ataque de pánico!	Yes	Yes	Yes	Yes	Also visual effects supervisor & animator

=== Other credits ===
Year	Title	Role	Notes
2017	La peste	Composer	Short film
2020	My Heart Goes Boom!	Thanks	
2021	Chaos Walking	Director of reshoots	
