= J. R. Bookwalter =

American filmmaker

- Born: August 16, 1966 (age 59); Akron, Ohio
- Other names: Lance Randas
- Occupations: Director; writer; producer
- Years active: 1985-present

J. R. Bookwalter (born August 16, 1966) is an American filmmaker, screenwriter, and producer from Akron, Ohio. He is best known for directing low-budget horror, action, and science fiction films, including The Dead Next Door, Robot Ninja (both 1989), Ozone (1993), and Polymorph (1996). He is the founder of Tempe Entertainment which ran from 1988 until 2019 when the company's name changed to Makeflix.

== Career ==
J. R. Bookwalter began his career at the age of 19 in 1985 with The Dead Next Door. The film was an independent production shot on Super 8 film in Akron, Ohio, over the course of four years. It was executive produced by Sam Raimi, with Bruce Campbell supervising post-production sound as well as providing the overdubbed voices of two of the lead characters. Bookwalter wrote, directed, edited, and composed the score for the film. The Dead Next Door has gone on to amass a cult following and has been noted as being the most expensive shot on Super-8 film ever made.

During post-production on The Dead Next Door, Bookwalter wrote and directed the low-budget superhero action film Robot Ninja, which was executive produced by David DeCoteau. The film was released in 1989 and features cameos from Scott Spiegel, Burt Ward, and Linnea Quigley. In the years since its release, Robot Ninja achieved cult status on the video collector market. In a review for the 30th anniversary Blu-ray release, Rue Morgue states, "Splishy gore, body horror, off-kilter performances, and a self-reflexive edge make Robot Ninja a cut above your average exploitation movie fare."

Bookwalter produced Skinned Alive in 1990. The film stars Scott Spiegel and Mary Jackson.

Beginning in the early 1990s, Bookwalter directed a handful of low-budget shot-on-video films including Zombie Cop (1991), Maximum Impact, and Humanoids from Atlantis (both 1992), often times crediting himself under the pseudo name "Lance Randas".

In 1993, Bookwalter directed Ozone starring James R. Black. In their review for the film, Film Threat called it "A dreamy descent into Cronenberg-esque madness."

In 1996, Bookwalter directed Polymorph; written by and starring frequent collaborator James L. Edwards.

In the late 1990s and early 2000s, Bookwalter worked for Full Moon Pictures, producing and directing multiple projects for founder Charles Band including Witchouse 2: Blood Coven, Witchouse 3: Demon Fire, and Mega Scorpions (also known as Stingers).

== Filmography ==
Year	Title	Director	Writer	Notes	Ref(s)
1989	The Dead Next Door	Yes	Yes		
1989	Robot Ninja	Yes	Yes		
1991	Zombie Cop	Yes	Yes	Credited as "Lance Randas"	
1991	Kingdom of the Vampire	Yes	Yes		
1992	Maximum Impact	Yes	Yes	Credited as "Lance Randas"	
1992	Humanoids from Atlantis	Yes	Yes	Credited as "Lance Randas"	
1992	Galaxy of the Dinosaurs	Yes	No	Credited as "Lance Randas"	
1993	Ozone	Yes	Yes		
1995	The Sandman	Yes	Yes		
1996	Polymorph	Yes	Yes		
1997	Bloodletting	No	No	Executive producer	
2000	Witchouse 2: Blood Coven	Yes	No		
2001	Witchouse 3: Demon Fire	Yes	Yes		
2003	Mega Scorpions	Yes	Yes	Also known as Stingers	
2024	Side Effects May Vary	Yes	No		
