= James L. Edwards (actor) =

American actor and filmmaker

- Born: November 26, 1972 (age 53)
- Occupations: Actor; director; writer
- Years active: 1985-present

James L. Edwards (born November 26, 1972) is an American actor, screenwriter, and filmmaker from Akron, Ohio. He is best known for his acting roles in independent shot-on-video horror films, including The Dead Next Door (1989), Ozone (1993), Polymorph (1996), and Bloodletting (1997), as well as writing, directing, and starring in Her Name Was Christa (2020), Brimstone Incorporated (2021), and the forthcoming Trivial.

== Biography ==
Edwards began acting as a teenager making his debut in J. R. Bookwalter's 1989 zombie film The Dead Next Door and proceeding to star in a string of independent shot on video horror films throughout the 1990s, including Ozone (1993), Polymorph (1996), and Bloodletting (1997). After a hiatus, he returned to acting in the mid 2000's and in 2020 made his directorial debut with Her Name Was Christa which he also wrote and starred in along with Brimstone Incorporated and the upcoming Trivial. In 2021, he directed and starred in the music video for the song Stitch from the band Sponge. Edwards co-stars in the David Ellefson produced and Drew Fortier directed found footage horror film Dwellers portraying a fictionalized version of himself.

== Filmography ==
=== Actor ===
Year	Title	Role	Notes
1989	The Dead Next Door	Dead kid in farmhouse	Multiple roles & behind the scenes
1989	Robot Ninja	Sculley	
1990	Skinned Alive	The Walkman Victim	
1991	Zombie Cop	Sculley	
1992	Maximum Impact	Richie	
1992	Humanoids from Atlantis	Ken Adams	
1992	Chickboxer	Billy Anderson	
1992	Galaxy of the Dinosaurs	Graft/Gurtorius Gonimus	
1993	Ozone	Sam DeBartolo - The Drug Lord/Spikes	
1995	The Sandman	Gerald Rivers	
1996	Polymorph	Ted	
1997	Bloodletting	Butch Harlow / Walt Lipsky	
2005	The Red Skulls	Jack	
2007	Cordoba Nights	Pizza Customer	
2008	June 9	The Stranger	
2008	Poison Sweethearts	Boss	
2015	Milfs vs Zombies	Reverend Nathan Ashberry	
2017	Killer Campout	Samson Del Marr	
2018	WrestleMassacre	Reverend Nathan Ashberry	
2018	Pharisee	Street Mugger 1	Cameo
2020	Her Name Was Christa	Stephen Booth	
2020	Deathboard	Merle Del Marr	
2021	Dwellers	James	
2021	Brimstone Incorporated	Richard Hackett	Segment: First Date
2022	Shriekshow	Shepard	
2022	Hell Van	Officer Walt	
2024	Trivial	Dean Mathers	
2024	Side Effects May Vary	Glenn Rollins	
2026	Bunker Heights	Bellini	

=== Director ===
Year	Title	Notes
2020	Her Name Was Christa	
2021	Brimstone Incorporated	
2021	Sponge - Stitch	Music video
2024	Trivial	
2025	The Lucid - Maggot Wind	Music Video

=== Writer ===
Year	Title	Notes
1989	Interzone	Uncredited
1996	Polymorph	
1998	Psycho Sisters	
2016	Fiendish Fables	
2017	Killer Campout	
2020	Her Name Was Christa	
2021	Brimstone Incorporated	
2024	Trivial	
2024	Side Effects May Vary	
