= Robot Ninja =

1989 film by J. R. Bookwalter

- Promotional release poster
- Directed by: J. R. Bookwalter
- Written by: J. R. Bookwalter
- Produced by: J. R. Bookwalter; David DeCoteau
- Starring: Michael Todd; Bogdan Pecic; James L. Edwards; Maria Markovic; Floyd Ewing Jr.; Scott Spiegel; Burt Ward; Linnea Quigley
- Cinematography: Michael Tolochko
- Edited by: J. R. Bookwalter
- Music by: J. R. Bookwalter
- Release date: December 4, 1989 (United States)
- Country: United States
- Language: English
- Budget: $15,000

Robot Ninja is a 1989 American superhero action horror film written, produced, directed and edited by J. R. Bookwalter. The film stars Michael Todd, Bogdan Pecic, James L. Edwards, Scott Spiegel, Burt Ward, and Linnea Quigley.

== Plot ==
Leonard is a depressed and embittered comic book artist resentful toward his agent and publisher for capitalizing on the success of his comic book series Robot Ninja. After witnessing the brutal rape and murder of a young couple, a socially frustrated Leonard turns to Dr. Hubert Goodknight to help turn him into a real life version of his own creation, Robot Ninja, to take to the streets and inflict revenge on a group of disturbed thugs.

== Cast ==
- Michael Todd as Leonard Miller / Robot Ninja
- Bogdan Pecic as Dr. Hubert Goodknight
- James L. Edwards as Sculley
- Maria Markovic as Gody Sanchez
- Floyd Ewing Jr. as Officer Hickox
- Bill Morrison as Buddy Revelle
- Scott Spiegel as Marty Coleslaw
- Burt Ward as Stanley Kane
- Linnea Quigley as Miss Barbeau

== Production ==
=== Development ===
During the post-production of The Dead Next Door in 1989, producer David DeCoteau offered J. R. Bookwalter a $15,000 budget to write and direct a film with the title Robot Ninja. DeCoteau served as an executive producer on Robot Ninja.

=== Filming ===
Robot Ninja was shot in Ohio, in the townships of Springfield and Green, as well as in the cities of Kent and Cuyahoga Falls.

== Reception ==
In 2014, Felix Vasquez Jr. of Cinema Crazed wrote "As noted, most of the narrative is all over the place, with the movie showing its bottom of the barrel budget. In one scene, a truck speeding through a highway obviously is just being rocked back and forth by stage hands while the actors mimic driving. Robot Ninja is embarrassing D grade slop best suited for the bold and masochistic movie geek."

In 2019, Rocco T. Thompson of Rue Morgue gave the film a positive review, writing, "A cult film in the truest sense, Robot Ninja has been out-of-print since its initial run from Cinema Home Video, making it something of a rare gem to VHS aficionados, who helped keep its memory on life support despite its myriad presentational flaws." Thompson continues, "Robot Ninja is the real deal: a charmingly lowbrow cult actioner that sits perfectly in that delicious liminal space between postmodernism and excessive 80's earnestness that all those turbo kids and hobos with shotguns are trying so hard to emulate."

== Release ==
Robot Ninja was released on VHS in 1989 by Cinema Home Video and quickly went out of print. It has gone on to become a rare and valuable VHS cult title amongst media collectors.

In 2019, a 2K restoration of the film remastered from its original 16 mm negative was released on Blu-ray and DVD by Tempe Digital.
