= Arthouse musical =

Genre of film

Arthouse musical (or experimental musical) is a combination of an art film and a film musical.

== Notable arthouse musicals ==
=== 20th Century ===
- The Umbrellas of Cherbourg (Jacques Demy, 1964)
- The Young Girls of Rochefort (Jacques Demy, 1967)
- Cabaret (Bob Fosse, 1972)
- The Rocky Horror Picture Show (Jim Sharman, 1975)
- New York, New York (Martin Scorsese, 1977)
- All That Jazz (Bob Fosse, 1979)
- Bubble Bath (György Kovásznai, 1979)
- Pennies from Heaven (Herbert Ross, 1981)
- Forbidden Zone (Richard Elfman, 1982)
- Possibly in Michigan (Cecelia Condit, 1983)
- Golden Eighties (Chantal Ackerman, 1986)
- Under the Cherry Moon (Prince, 1986)
- Strictly Ballroom (Baz Luhrmann, 1992)
- Everyone Says I Love You (Woody Allen, 1996)
- Little Voice (Mark Herman, 1998)

=== 21st Century ===
- Billy Elliot (Stephen Daldry, 2000)
- Dancer in the Dark (Lars von Trier, 2000)
- Moulin Rouge (Baz Luhrmann, 2001)
- 8 Femmes (François Ozon, 2002)
- Once (John Carney, 2007)
- The Lure (Agnieszka Smoczyńska, 2015)
- Cyrano (Joe Wright, 2021)
- Annette (Leos Carax, 2022)

== Notable arthouse musical directors ==
- Leos Carax
- Jacques Demy
- Bob Fosse
- Baz Luhrmann

== See also ==
- Postmodernist film
  - Modernist film
- Arthouse action film
- Arthouse animation
- Art horror
- Arthouse science fiction film
- New Hollywood
