= Habfürdő =

1979 Hungarian experimental animated film musical

Habfürdő (also known as Foam Bath & Bubble Bath in English) is a 1979 Hungarian experimental animated film musical from Pannonia Film Studio directed by renowned painter György Kovásznai.

== Summary ==
Anikó, a medical student, is visited by a soon-to-be-wed Zsolt, a would-be artist getting cold feet about his upcoming wedding to society girl Klári. Unwilling to confront Klári himself, Zsolt begs Anikó to make a phone call telling Klári that he cannot go through with the wedding. As Anikó delays making the call and Zsolt delays his decision on whether to reunite with Klári for their wedding, the two open up about their careers, personal lives, and visions for the future, told through experimental animated musical numbers.

== Voice cast ==
- Kornél Gelley as Zsolt Mohai (speaking voice)
- Albert Antalffy as Zsolt Mohai (singing voice)
- Lenke Lorán as Klári Horváth (speaking voice)
- Kati Bontovits as Klári Horváth (singing voice)
- Katalin Dobos as Anikó "Anna/Annie" Parádi (speaking voice)
- Anna Papp as Anikó "Anna/Annie" Parádi (singing voice)
- Arany Szögi as Aunt Zsófia
- Vera Venczel

== See also ==
- Arthouse animation
- Arthouse musical
- Modernist film
