= Shot-on-video film =

Type of film shot on camcorder

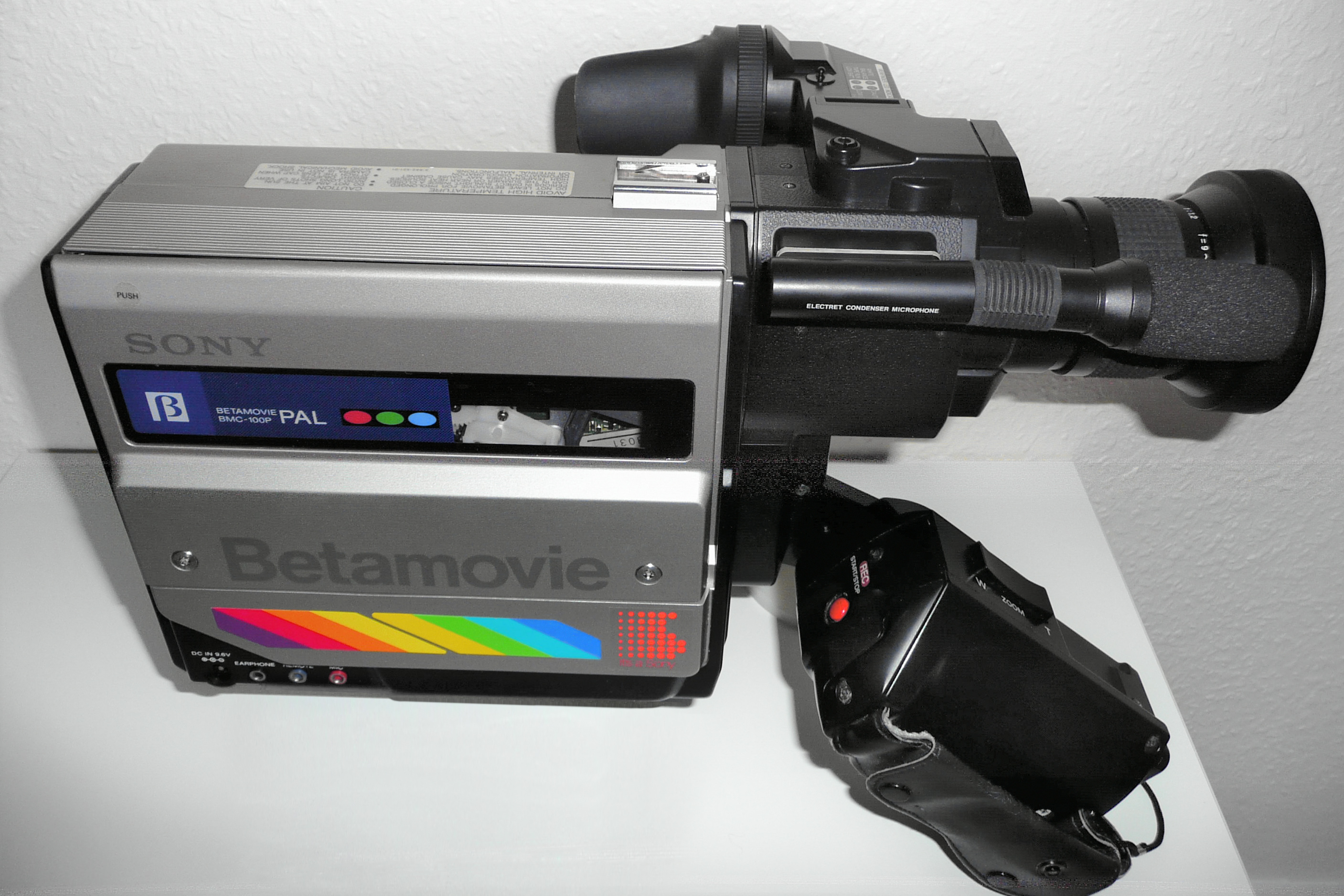
The Sony Betamovie BMC-110, released in 1983 as the first consumer-grade camcorder.

A shot-on-video (SOV) film, also known as a shot-on-VHS film or a camcorder film, is a film shot using camcorders and consumer-grade equipment, as opposed to film stock or high-end digital movie cameras.

== History ==
The first theatrically-released films shot on videotape pre-date the invention of the camcorder and related consumer video technology, starting with the Electronovision process developed by film producer and entrepreneur H. William "Bill" Sargent, Jr. around 1964. Electronovision used conventional analog Image Orthicon-based studio video cameras (RCA TK-60 cameras in Electronovision's case), recording video from them to an Ampex high-band 2" Quadraplex-format video tape recorder (VTR), all configured to use the black-and-white 819-line interlaced 25 frame per second (FPS) video standard, used in France for TV broadcasting at the time. The videotaped 819-line footage was then edited, with the final cut being transferred from tape to film stock via a kinescope process. The 819-line video standard was chosen by Electronovision over the regular 525-line 30 FPS video standard in use in the US at the time, due to its higher resolution and closer frame rate to motion picture film's 24 FPS, making it a better fit for transfer to film.

A few films were shot and released using the Electronovision process, such as The TAMI Show, (1964), Hamlet (1964), and Harlow (1965).

Around 1969, The Vidtronics Company, a division of Technicolor, had also developed a process for transferring color videotape to film, this time using standard 525-line NTSC color video gear. To demonstrate the potential of their process, they produced The Resurrection of Zachary Wheeler (1971). The picture was shot by the crew from the TV series Death Valley Days, transferred and processed by Technicolor, and distributed by a Technicolor subsidiary, Gold Key Entertainment. It was not successful in theatres, but was frequently shown in TV syndication and 16mm rentals.

Other films using Vidtronics' tape-to-film process were Why? (1971), and 200 Motels (1971), the latter being shot using the 625-line PAL color video standard at Pinewood Studios in the UK.

In 1973, Hollywood actor/producer Ed Platt, made famous by his role as "The Chief" in the NBC-TV series Get Smart, raised the money to produce Santee, starring Glenn Ford. Platt saw the advantages of using videotape over film, and used the facilities of Burbank's Compact Video Systems to shoot the western on location in the California and Nevada deserts. The motion picture was shot with Norelco PCP-70 portable plumbicon NTSC cameras and portable Ampex VR-3000 2" VTRs, then transferred to film at Consolidated Film Industries in Hollywood. The film was not commercially successful.

Feminist filmmaker JoAnn Elam weaved together kinescoped video interviews of three women (each passing the handheld camera to one another) with 16mm film imagery on her 1975 experimental documentary Rape.

== Examples ==
Shot-on-video films became more common in the wake of the release of Sony's professional-grade Betacam and consumer-grade Betamovie camcorders in 1983. Many shot-on-video films were low-budget and belong to the horror genre. Filmmaker siblings the Polonia brothers were known for their shot-on-video horror films, such as Splatter Farm (1987) and Feeders (1996). A non-horror example of SOV cinema includes the meditative video art of Bill Viola who was one of the first to enthusiastically experimented with the then-new format.

=== Theatrically released examples ===
The scenes in Bill Gunn's 1980 film Personal Problems were shot using a videocassette recorder which was a new technology at the time (as most previous films were shot using film stock).

The 1994 documentary film Hoop Dreams was one of the first shot-on-video documentaries to receive a wide theatrical release. The 1999 film The Blair Witch Project was shot on both 16 mm film and the consumer-grade Hi8 video format, which was transferred to film for its national theatrical release. An international example is Danish filmmaker Lars von Trier's minimalist film The Idiots (1998; aka Dogme #2).

=== List of other notable shot-on-video films ===
- 200 Motels (1971)
- Mayday Raw 1971 (1971)
- Adland (1974)
- The Amputee (1974)
- Lord of the Universe (1974)
- Julia Reichert's Academy Award-nominated Union Maids (1976)
- The Police Tapes (1977)
- Mr. Mike's Mondo Video (1979)
- The Reflecting Pool (1979)
- Boardinghouse (1982)
- Possibly in Michigan (1983)
- Sledgehammer (1983)
- The Emmy Award-winning Special Bulletin (1983)
- Suffer Little Children (1983)
- Black Devil Doll from Hell (1984)
- Blonde Death (1984)
- Overdrawn at the Memory Bank (1984)
- Rock My Religion (1984)
- Screambook (1984)
- Blood Cult (1985)
- The Ripper (1985)
- Cards of Death (1986)
- Heavy Metal Parking Lot (1986)
- Redneck Zombies (1987)
- Tales from the QuadeaD Zone (1987)
- Video Violence (1987)
- We, the Normal (1987)
- 555 (1988)
- Rob Nilsson's Sundance-winning Heat and Sunlight (1988)
- Tongues Untied (1988)
- Twisted Issues (1988)
- Woodchipper Massacre (1988)
- Citizen Tania (1989)
- Houseboat Horror (1989)
- The McPherson Tape (1989)
- Sir Drone (1989)
- It's Only a Movie! (1990)
- Bossy Burger (1991)
- Wax or the Discovery of Television Among the Bees (1991)
- The controversial 1992 BBC One TV movie Ghostwatch
- Heidi, Midlife Crisis Trauma Center and Negative Media-Engram Abreaction Zone (1992)
- Ozone (1993)
- Traces of Death (1993)
- Conrad Brooks vs. the Werewolf (1994)
- Without Warning (1994)
- Bloody Muscle Body Builder in Hell (1995)
- Spin (1995)
- Polymorph (1996)
- Bloodletting (1997)
- Ernest Borgnine on the Bus (1997)
- Premutos (1997)
- Rollergator (1997)
- Waco: The Rules of Engagement (1997)
- Jan-Gel: The Beast from the East (1999)
- Genghis Blues (1999)
- Praise You (1999)
- In the Dark (2000)
- I Never Left The White Room (2000)
- August Underground (2001)
- Gozu (2003)
- The Columbine-inspired video diary Zero Day (2003)
- Each Time I Kill (2007)
- Harmony Korine's Trash Humpers (2009)

== Legacy ==
Union Maids, Tongues Untied and Hoop Dreams are each inducted into the National Film Registry.

Possibly in Michigan first gained notoriety on social media in 2015, and has gained popularity among Gen Z teens.

Some SOV films like Feeders and Rollergator were spoofed by RiffTrax, consisting of former Mystery Science Theater 3000 alumni Kevin Murphy, Bill Corbett and Michael J. Nelson.

Heavy Metal Parking Lot was positioned at #67 by Rolling Stone on their list of 70 greatest music documentaries.

Trailers for some SOV titles like Death Nurse (1987) and Cannibal Campout (1988) were featured on the 2021 compilation film The AGFA Horror Trailer Show: Videorage.

== See also ==
- 480i, the video mode used for standard-definition digital video
- Analog horror
- Found footage film
- Cinéma vérité
- Snuff film
- Mockumentary
- Postmodernist film
- Video art
- Vulgar auteurism
- Video essay
