= Boardinghouse (film) =

- Directed by: John Wintergate
- Written by: John Wintergate
- Produced by: Peter Baahlu
- Starring: John Wintergate: Kalassu; Alexandra Day
- Cinematography: Jan Lucas: Obee Ray
- Edited by: Jim Balcom; Johnny Kay
- Production company: Blustarr
- Distributed by: Coast Films
- Release date: April 15, 1983
- Running time: 88 minutes (Note: The original theatrical cut of the film runs approximately 88 minutes in length. However, the home video cut that appears on VHS releases of the film is longer, running approximately 99 minutes. Both of these cuts are presented on the 2021 Blu-ray release from the American Genre Film Archive, in addition to a third alternate cut titled Psycho Killer. An extended 157-minute cut of the film—deemed the "director's cut"—was made available in 2015 on the Slasher//Video DVD release, though this was an unofficial composite cut featuring footage from various sources.)
- Country: United States
- Language: English
- Budget: US$10,000

Boardinghouse (Note: The film's title is sometimes stylized as BoardingHouse; it was also released as Housegeist, as well as in an alternate cut known as Psycho Killer in 1984.) is a 1982 American supernatural slasher film directed, written by, and starring musician John Wintergate. Its plot follows a group of aspiring actresses and models who begin to die mysteriously in a Los Angeles boarding house, which was once the site of a series of bizarre deaths. It carries the distinction of being the first horror film to be shot-on-video.

The film was released on DVD by Code Red in 2008. In 2015, Slasher//Video issued a two-disc edition of the film on DVD, featuring both the 98-minute theatrical cut, and an unofficial extended 157-minute version deemed the "director's cut." The American Genre Film Archive (AGFA) released the film on Blu-ray in 2021 featuring three cuts of the film: The 88-minute theatrical cut; the 98-minute home video cut, and an alternate cut released in 1984 under the title Psycho Killer.

== Plot ==
On September 18, 1972, Dr. Hoffman and his wife, both of whom specialized in the study of telekinesis and the occult, are found dead in their Mulholland Drive ranch home on the night of their anniversary party. Their deaths, ruled a double suicide, were witnessed by the couple's thirteen-year-old daughter, Debbie, who was institutionalized due to a subsequent nervous breakdown. A couple who subsequently purchase the home also suffer gruesome, unexplained deaths in it, as does the following buyer, Herman Royce.

In 1982, the residence is reopened as a boarding house by Jim Royce, nephew of Herman, who has inherited the home. Jim, a playboy who himself is obsessed with the occult and telekinesis, places a newspaper ad encouraging young, single women to move in. Various young aspiring actresses and models—Sandy, Suzie, Cindy, Gloria, Pam, and Terri—respond and move into the home. After they settle in, an English woman, Debbie, arrives, pleading to move in; she agrees to stay in the sole remaining cramped spare room in the house.

Meanwhile, Detective Richard Grant is casing the home for unknown reasons. He sends a private investigator to the house, but he is electrocuted in a bathtub before being buried in the backyard by an unseen assailant. Meanwhile, Jim exhibits his own telekinetic powers to Victoria, an aspiring singer. She is fascinated by his abilities. That night, she suffers a vivid nightmare of being dragged into the grave of Dr. Hoffman. Richard eventually arrives at the house to visit Cindy, who is revealed to be his ex-girlfriend. Richard chastises Cindy for her new living arrangement and for having fled upon his marriage proposal.

Inspired by Jim and jealous of the other women in the house, Victoria begins attempting to hone her own supernatural powers. She soon discovers she too has the ability to harness telekinesis. Cindy mysteriously vanishes on the beach while having a rendezvous with Jim. A note left behind indicates she has reunited with Richard. The next day, Jim and the women prepare for a housewarming party they are holding that night. While cleaning the house, Victoria suffers another terrifying vision in which a looming, monstrous entity chases her through the house. Later, she finds her pet cat, Pumpkin, dead.

At the housewarming party, Jim's college friend, a police officer, arrives to tell him that Cindy's body was recovered from the beach. He also informs him that it is the tenth anniversary of the Hoffman deaths. Outside, the officer is overcome by a supernatural force which makes him shoot a partygoer before killing himself. Meanwhile, Pam gets into an argument with Debbie, and upon returning inside, is overcome by the supernatural force, which causes her to claw her own eyeballs out. Shortly after, the house's gardener is found stabbed to death by the pool. Debbie soon reveals herself to Jim as Deborah Hoffman, the daughter of Dr. Hoffman, returning to claim her home. It is also revealed she had an incestuous relationship with her father, and was responsible for the deaths of him and his mother. Using her supernatural powers, she has been killing the boardinghouse tenants one by one, deeming them trespassers. Jim and Victoria bond together and engage in a psychic battle with Debbie, and ultimately are able to defeat her.

A postscript reveals that the Hoffman residence burned to the ground the night of the party, and that Jim is now working professionally as a programmer, while Victoria is a successful singer. Debbie Hoffman's body is yet to be found.

== Cast ==
- Kalassu as Victoria Spelling
- Alexandra Day as Debbie Hoffman
- Mary McKinley as Cindy
- John Wintergate as James "Jim" Royce/Gardener (as Hawk Adly)
- Joel Riordan as Joel Weintraub
- Brian Bruderlin as Richard
- Mary McKinley as Cindy
- Tracy O’Brian as Suzie
- Rosane Woods as Gloria
- Cindy Williamson as Pam
- Jim Vincenzo as Officer Paul
- Christopher Conlan as Christopher
- Elizabeth Hall as Terri
- Tom Mones as The Agent
- Dean Dissico as Harris
- Elliot Van Koghbe as Officer Weston

== Production ==
The original idea for the project was developed by John and Kalassu Wintergate at the end of 1978 and the script was started with the idea to film a comedy horror movie. A year or so later Elliot Van Koghbe read an article in American Cinematographer. The article mentioned that George Lucas was experimenting with producing films shot originally on video. Wintergate also had the same idea, because the large funds for a 35 mm production was not yet available. So after researching the idea more closely Wintergate decided to venture into producing a low-budget comedy horror film on video reserving the major portion of the budget for the expense of making the transfer to film. J & K Wintergate funded the project and wrote the script. As an assistant casting director in Hollywood, Van Koghbe had experience with video equipment that was helpful. He, under an alternate name (Obee Ray), also shot a couple of extra sequences for the eventual re-edit which the distributor insisted on. The distributor, in order to make it strictly horror, insisted for most of the real comedy scenes to be cut, which was virtually impossible since everything had been shot with the underlying comedy aspect. This made it into a quirky somewhat puzzling film but it inadvertently helped the film to become an eventual cult classic all over the world.

Boardinghouse is notable for being the first horror film to be shot on video.

The film also used a movie gimmick titled Horror Vision, wherein a warning would pop up on the screen to let audiences know that a violent scene was happening soon.

== Release ==
Despite being a shot-on-video project, Boardinghouse was blown up to 35mm film and was given a limited release theatrically in the United States by Coast Films, with screenings beginning in Knoxville, Tennessee on April 15, 1983.

=== Home media ===
The film was released on VHS by Paragon Video Productions.

It was officially released on DVD by Code Red in 2008.

On February 25, 2013, Slasher//Video founder Jesús Terán announced via YouTube that he had obtained the rights to release Boardinghouse for its 30th anniversary. The film was remastered from the original Betacam tape. The special features include a never before seen Director's Cut which is twice the length of the original cut, featuring several scenes cut from the previously released version due to the distributor's request. Other features include a brand new commentary with director John Wintergate and actress/wife Kalassu, two never before seen interviews, two music videos made the same time as Boardinghouse, an extensive group of trailers and television spots, photo gallery, and more. The DVD was released on July 22, 2013 by Slasher//Video, being the first ever DVD to feature a Microsoft Xbox 360 Platinum Hits keep case.

On October 26, 2021, the American Genre Film Archive (AGFA) released the film for the first time on Blu-ray, featuring a 2K scan of an original 35mm theatrical print, as well as the film's original home video cut, transferred from the master tape; additionally, another alternate cut of the film released in 1984 under the title Psycho Killer is included on a secondary disc. According to Joseph Ziemba, a contributing writer for the horror website Bleeding Skull, the previously released 157-minute version of the film dubbed the "director's cut" was an unauthorized version of the film, more akin to a fan edit, that had been put together in iMovie using footage from various sources. This cut of the film is not included on the AGFA Blu-ray release.

=== Critical reception ===
A contemporaneous review published in Cinefantastique noted: "This film is a perfect example of why horror grosses have plummeted at the box-office. Charging anyone to see this crap is a crime. Special effects, acting and production values are non-existent."

In anticipation for a 2017 revival screening, the Chicago Film Society wrote of the film: "Boardinghouse is an essential piece of lunatic cinema, complete with requisite high levels of gore and camp." Noel Murray of The A.V. Club described the film as "a shotgun marriage of Halloween, Carrie and The Amityville Horror." In his book The Gorehound’s Guide to Splatter Films of the 1980s, film scholar Scott Aaron Stine called the film "godawful lousy."

== Sources ==
- Stine, Scott Aaron (2003). The Gorehound's Guide to Splatter Films of the 1980s. McFarland. ISBN 978-1-476-61132-7.
