= Peter Wayne =

Peter Wayne may refer to:

- Stage name of Karl Swenson
- Peter Wayne, character in 555 (1988 film)
