= Her Name Was Christa =

American horror film

- Directed by: James L. Edwards
- Written by: James L. Edwards
- Starring: Shianne Daye; James L. Edwards; Drew Fortier; Rick Jermain; Kaylee Williams
- Cinematography: Gordon Cameron
- Edited by: Jason Kasper
- Music by: Matthew Sturgeon
- Production company: Buffalora Entertainment Group
- Release date: February 14, 2020
- Country: United States
- Language: English

Her Name Was Christa is an American horror film written by, directed by, and starring James L. Edwards. The plot of the film follows a lonely middle aged man who falls in love with a prostitute and is faced with a horrific choice after their arrangement takes a turn for the worse. The film stars Shianne Daye, James L. Edwards, and Drew Fortier.

== Plot ==
Stephen, a lonely and jaded middle-aged telemarketer, begins seeing prostitutes at the behest of his coworker Nick. Stephen eventually settles on one named Candy, paying her to act as his girlfriend. He and Candy gradually develop genuine romantic connection.

Stephen requests days off from work to take Candy on vacation, but is rejected. Furious, he attacks his superior and is subsequently fired. Stephen confesses to Candy that he has lost his job and can no longer afford her, but she assures him that she is genuinely in love with him and will continue seeing him regardless, and reveals that her real name is Christa. The two agree to have sex, then Stephen falls asleep while Christa showers. When Stephen wakes, he discovers that Christa has secretly taken drugs in the shower and died from an overdose.

Devastated, Stephen begins hallucinating that Christa is still alive and resolves to keep her body. Over the course of the next months, he continues a romantic and sexual relationship with Christa's decomposing corpse under the delusion that she lives, and the smell begins attracting the suspicion of his neighbors. The hallucinatory Christa informs Stephen that her body will eventually completely decompose, and that he must commit suicide for the two to continue to be together. Stephen resolves to shoot himself, but just before he could do so, he is arrested by the police.

Stephen is taken to a mental hospital, where he willingly commits himself. Two doctors discuss his case, revealing that his coworker from his telemarketing job, Nick, does not exist. Stephen imagines himself with Christa again, then secretly kills himself by slitting his wrist in order to reunite with her.

== Cast ==
- Shianne Daye as Christa Sullivan
- James L. Edwards as Stephen Booth
- Drew Fortier as Nick Perkins
- Rick Jermain as Blaze
- Kaylee Williams as Raven

== Production ==
Shooting took place over 18 non consecutive days between September 2017 and November 2018. A long hiatus took place during the middle of production due to the original actress set to portray Christa pulling out of the project citing creative differences over the graphic nature of the content in the film.

== Release ==
The film was released on February 14, 2020 on Blu-ray, DVD, and digital streaming.

== Reception ==
Reviews for the film were positive with Pophorror.com calling it "Both Brutally Honest And Strangely Comforting".

Horrornews.net concluded that, "Her Name Was Christa is nothing short of amazing. While I’m not certain I would call it a horror movie it is a twisted love story that contains horror elements as well as its share of disturbing and shocking scenes. I haven’t had a film impact me this much since I saw the likes of Make-out with Violence, The Dead Girl, and Megan Is Missing. Even though I loved this film I felt the need to check out some cartoons after I watched it just so I felt a little better."

Myindieproductions.com stated that, "With Her Name Was Christa, James manages to deliver an effective gut-punch and give us an eerie spin on the festering, debilitating effects of loneliness and loss."
