= Brimstone Incorporated =

2021 film by James L. Edwards and Brad Twigg

- Directed by: James L. Edwards; Brad Twigg
- Written by: James L. Edwards; Jonathan Moody
- Produced by: James L. Edwards; Gordon Cameron; Brad Twigg
- Starring: see below
- Cinematography: Gordon Cameron; Juan Sanchez
- Edited by: Gordon Cameron; George Milnes II; Brad Twigg
- Music by: Matthew Sturgeon
- Production company: Buffalora Entertainment
- Release date: April 13, 2021 (United States)
- Country: United States

Brimstone Incorporated is a 2021 horror anthology film directed by James L. Edwards and Brad Twigg. The film's cast includes Sasha Graham, Kaylee Williams, Drew Fortier, and James L. Edwards.

Brimstone Incorporated consists of three short stories: "First Date", "Mama's Boy", and "Skunk Weed" with the film bookended by a wraparound titled "Tempter and Associates" featuring the character Gregory Asmodeus (Drew Fortier), an employee of Damien Tempter who interviews characters from each segment allowing them to plead their case in regards to their placement in Hell.

== Plot ==
The film is presented as an anthology of short horror films told via a frame narrative which links each story together.

=== "Tempter and Associates" (Wraparound) ===
- Written and directed by James L. Edwards

The wraparound focuses on Gregory Asmodeus (Drew Fortier) who is tasked with interviewing the newly deceased in Hell; allowing them to explain their side of their story in an effort to try to prove that they do not belong in Hell.

=== "First Date" ===
- Written and directed by James L. Edwards

At a quiet diner, Richard (James L. Edwards) is on an awkward blind date with Renee (Shianne Daye) whose off-putting overbearing nature toward Richard escalates into her taking the whole diner hostage when she finds out her date does not feel the same way she does.

=== "Mama's Boy" ===
- Directed by James L. Edwards
- Written by James L. Edwards and Jonathan Moody

Priscilla Parker (Sasha Graham) is an overprotective mother whose son, Justin (Tim Hale), blames her for not being able to keep a girlfriend because of how off-putting she is. It is revealed that she has been protecting her son from a demon who has a vendetta against her and has been tormenting her by possessing all of her son's dates for whom she must murder to keep him safe.

=== "Skunk Weed" ===
- Directed by Brad Twigg
- Written by James L. Edwards

Bennie Simmons, an agoraphobic who writes jingles for a living, receives a care package from his brother that includes a new strain of marijuana. After smoking it, Bennie begins seeing creatures and morbid hallucinations that lead him to self destruct. We find out that Bennie's misfortunes are due to him not receiving a notice to vacate his apartment for fumigation.

== Cast ==
Tempter and Associates (Wraparound Story)

- Drew Fortier as Gregory Asmodeus
- Geoff Burkman as Damien Tempter
- Adam Scott Clevenger as Donald Midian
- Tim Novotny as John
- Tharasa DiMeo as Lilith
- Douglas Esper as Goon

First Date

- James L. Edwards as Richard
- Shianne Daye as Renee
- Christine Morrison as Mother
- Ron George as Cell Phone Patron
- Shari Rose as Waitress
- Gordon Cameron as Trucker
- Mike Vamos as EMT
- David Bachmeier as Fat Boy Diner Patron
- Katie Gennero as Horror Punk Diner Patron
- Harlowe Edwards as Sophia

Mama's Boy

- Sasha Graham as Priscilla Parker
- Tim Hale as Justin Parker
- Kaylee Williams as Brittany

Skunk Weed

- Rick Jermain as Bennie Simmons

== Release ==
Brimstone Incorporated was released on Blu-ray and DVD on April 13, 2021.

== Reception ==
In a review for Horror News, Todd Martin wrote, "Each segment is great in its own unique way and you can tell that everyone involved with this film put their hearts and souls into it, and it really shows. I honestly can’t say anything bad about this film and hope it gets the love and respect that it deserves as it truly is an awesome movie."

Horror Society's Blacktooth reviewed the film concluding that, "The film isn’t that gory but if you are look for some fun kills and decent make-up effects then I highly suggest giving this one a spin. Overall, Brimstone Incorporated is a fantastic horror anthology that is a lot of fun. I highly recommend checking this one out. You will not be disappointed."
