= QT8: The First Eight =

American documentary film

- Theatrical release poster
- Directed by: Tara Wood
- Produced by: Tara Wood; Jake Zortman
- Cinematography: Jake Zortman
- Edited by: Eric Myerson; Jeremy Ward
- Music by: Doran Danoff; Tyler Wenzel
- Distributed by: Entertainment Squad; Wood Entertainment
- Release date: October 21, 2019
- Running time: 104 minutes
- Country: United States
- Language: English
- Box office: $101,346

QT8: The First Eight (Note: Originally titled 21 Years: Quentin Tarantino, stylized as QT8 | Quentin Tarantino: The First Eight) is a 2019 American documentary film co-produced and directed by Tara Wood. The documentary chronicles the life of filmmaker Quentin Tarantino, from his start at Video Archives up to the release of Once Upon a Time in Hollywood (2019). The film features interviews from the frequent collaborators of his films.

== Appearances ==
- Samuel L. Jackson
- Tim Roth
- Jennifer Jason Leigh
- Diane Kruger
- Kurt Russell
- Christoph Waltz
- Jamie Foxx
- Lucy Liu
- Bruce Dern
- Robert Forster
- Zoë Bell
- Eli Roth
- Michael Madsen
- Stacey Sher
- Scott Spiegel
- Richard N. Gladstein
- Louis Black

== Production ==
=== Development ===
In November 2015, about a month away from the release of Tarantino's The Hateful Eight, Tara Wood announced the making of a documentary on Tarantino. Originally titled 21 Years: Quentin Tarantino, it continues Wood's 21 Years documentary series after the release of the 2014 documentary dedicated to Richard Linklater. Early reports mentioned that it would have included interviews from John Travolta, Kerry Washington, Uma Thurman, Brad Pitt (who was busy due to promoting By the Sea), and Pam Grier (who was on the fence to appear).

=== Distributor ===
In 2016, the documentary was picked up by The Weinstein Company, who had collaborated on all of Tarantino's films at the time, for an international release, with the exception on the French-speaking market. The film was picked up at that year's Cannes Film Festival.

Following the Harvey Weinstein scandal breaking loose in late 2017, Wood tried to reclaim ownership to the project in the hopes to "allow the project to be handled with the care and consideration it, Mr. Tarantino, and all the participants deserve." The Weinstein Company refused, and the company filed for bankruptcy in March 2018. In July of that same year, the studio's successor Lantern Entertainment was formed and relinquished the film out of the sale by September. Following the ownership return, Wood said in a statement:

We are thrilled, and eager to conduct our final interviews and complete the documentary, free from Harvey Weinstein and his complicit cohorts. We look forward to finding a new distribution partner, timed with the July 2019 release of Quentin’s next film, Once Upon a Time in Hollywood.

The director's company, Wood Entertainment, partnered with Entertainment Squad to release the films in theaters and on demand.

== Release ==
Entertainment Squad released the film in theaters for a one night Fathom Events showing on October 21, 2019.

== Reception ==
=== Box office ===
Under the Fathom Events showing, the film earned a total gross of $101,346. Playing in over 458 theaters, the film earned a domestic gross of $51,896, and earned $49,450 internationally.

=== Critical reception ===
The film has received positive reviews. On Rotten Tomatoes, the film has earned a 92% critical rating based on 25 reviews, with an average rating of 7.3/10.

Tarantino himself gave a positive response to the film. At a screening of the film, he said:

Tara Wood did a really, really good job with this film... one of the things I think is interesting about the film, as opposed to everybody else who does a movie about filmmakers, she never asked to interview me, which I liked. I thought that was really cool. Normally that's the hook that everyone hangs their hat on.
