= Possibly in Michigan =

1983 short horror film

- Possibly in Michigan YouTube thumbnail
- Directed by: Cecelia Condit
- Written by: Cecelia Condit
- Starring: Bill Blume; Jill Sands; Karen Skladany
- Edited by: David Narosny
- Music by: Karen Skladany
- Release date: 1983
- Running time: 11:45 minutes.
- Country: United States
- Language: English

Possibly in Michigan is a 1983 American shot-on-video musical horror short film written and directed by Cecelia Condit, with music by Karen Skladany, who starred in the film as Janice. The film follows two women looking for perfumes in a department store, being stalked by a masked, cannibalistic murderer.

Condit considers it to be part of the "Jill Sands trilogy". This refers to three of her films which star the actress Jill Sands: Beneath the Skin, Possibly in Michigan, and Not a Jealous Bone.

== Plot ==
Two women, Sharon and Janice, are shopping at an empty department store for perfume, followed by a man in a mask, mouth agape, wearing a black suit. Both women are said to have a reputation for attracting violent men and making the violence seem to be the man's idea. Arthur (credited as "Prince Charming"), the man following them, is introduced as sharing the same inclinations as Sharon and Janice: violence and perfume.

Janice notices Arthur, recognizing him as someone she may have met in Michigan, and both women flee the department store. Sharon and Janice part ways after driving home, as Arthur follows them and stands outside Sharon's house, waiting for Janice to leave. A voiceover explains that Arthur has worn so many masks that he has forgotten who he is. "He imagined himself a frog, turned into a prince charming." He approaches the front door, appearing as a normal man, and rings the doorbell.

Janice is seen shooting at various masked figures at her home; the instant she shoots one, it disappears, and another appears in a different spot. Sharon, asleep, wakes up and goes to answer her door. When she sees who it is, she immediately drops to the ground and calls Janice on the phone. While they speak on the phone, Arthur picks up a stone from Sharon's yard, revealing a rotting mask beneath it. He shatters the bedroom window and breaks in, leaving glass and worms on her bed. Janice is seen shooting at more masked figures. As Sharon describes Arthur's appearance to Janice on the phone, he unexpectedly comes up behind Sharon and says, "the better to eat you with, my dear", in a distorted voice. Sharon turns around as Arthur kisses her.

Repeatedly pushing Sharon onto her bed, Arthur claims that she has two options: he will either eat her immediately or slowly dismember her, then eat her, claiming to do so for love; she protests, but he seems to ignore her. Janice shoots another masked figure and arrives at Sharon's front door. Arthur, now holding a knife, pins Sharon to her bed and begins choking her. He tells her that he has done this to six other women. Janice aims her pistol at Arthur and fatally shoots him. Sharon gets up and looks at Arthur's corpse in disgust.

The women lay Arthur's body out atop spread newspapers and begin to dismember him, making soup from his body parts. Nude, the women eat his remaining limbs, feeding scraps to their dog. While the two smoke cigarettes, Janice notices another masked man outside the window. She signals to Sharon, but the figure hides before Sharon can see. After eating, the women wrap Arthur's bones in newspapers and throw them into a trash bag. After putting the bag on the curb, a garbage truck comes and collects it, destroying the evidence.

== Cast ==
- Bill Blume as Arthur (listed as Prince Charming), the man stalking Sharon and Janice. Blume only appears at the very end of the film, as writer/director Cecelia Condit played Arthur throughout the entire time he’s masked, but is uncredited in the role.
- Jill Sands as Sharon, Janice's best friend.
- Karen Skladany as Janice, Sharon's best friend. Skladany also composed the music for the film.

== Reception and legacy ==
The film received funding from the National Endowment for the Arts and the Ohio Arts Council. The year the film was released, its final scene was shown on CBN and The 700 Club, where it was described as gay, anti-family, and anti-men. A year later, the short film was read as lesbian by the National Endowment for the Arts and was shown at the Museum of Modern Art.

The short film first gained notoriety on social media in 2015 and has gained popularity among Gen Z. Joanne Morreale called the film an example of a revenge fantasy for feminists, and Chris Straayer said the film was about male violence against women.

== See also ==
- Arthouse musical
- Avant-garde
