= Attack of the Helping Hand =

- Directed by: Scott Spiegel
- Written by: Scott Spiegel
- Produced by: Scott Spiegel
- Starring: Linda Quiroz; Sam Raimi
- Cinematography: Bruce Campbell; Sam Raimi (uncredited)
- Distributed by: The Metropolitan Film Group
- Release date: 1979
- Running time: Six minutes
- Language: English

Attack of the Helping Hand is a 1979 American dark comedy horror short film written and directed by Scott Spiegel and starring Linda Quiroz and Sam Raimi.

== Plot ==
Linda Quiroz plays a woman at home who prepares to make "Hamburger Helper." When she sets the box on the countertop and turns away, the Hamburger Helper Helping Hand materializes out of nowhere next to it. It comes to life, talks to her, and tries to molest her. She tries drowning it in the kitchen sink, which doesn't work; it appears dead for a moment, but then spits the water in her face, runs away and hides.

While she searches for it, the milkman shows up with a delivery. He touches her on the shoulder, and she mistakes him for the helping hand, then wrestles him to the floor. When he tells her where the hand is hiding, it then proceeds to kill the milkman with a kitchen knife in retaliation for "telling on him". The woman resorts to trapping the Hand in a bucket. The Hand screams that it is suffocating and plays dead. As she searches for a trash bag to dispose of the dead Hand, it escapes. She catches it and puts it through the blender, killing it. She then proceeds to continue preparing her meal, and opens a can of biscuit dough, only to find the Pillsbury Doughboy on her countertop, presumably starting her ordeal all over again.

== Cast ==
- Linda Quiroz
- Sam Raimi
- Bruce Campbell as the Hamburger Helper Helping Hand and the Pillsbury Doughboy (uncredited)
