= The Sandman (1995 film) =

- Directed by: J. R. Bookwalter
- Written by: J. R. Bookwalter; Matthew Jason Walsh
- Produced by: J. R. Bookwalter; James L. Edwards; Linda Weaver
- Starring: A.J. Richards; Rita Gutowski; Terry J. Lipko; James Viront; Barbara Katz-Norrod; Stan Fitzgerald
- Cinematography: Ron Bonk
- Edited by: J. R. Bookwalter
- Music by: Matthew Jason Walsh
- Production company: Suburban Tempe Company
- Distributed by: Tempe Video
- Release date: December 1995
- Running time: 90 minutes
- Country: United States
- Language: English

The Sandman is a 1995 American horror thriller film directed by J. R. Bookwalter and written by Bookwalter and Matthew Jason Walsh, starring A.J. Richards, Rita Gutowski, Terry J. Lipko, James Viront, Barbara Katz-Norrod and Stan Fitzgerald.

== Cast ==
- A.J. Richards as Gary
- Rita Gutowski as Maris
- Terry J. Lipko as Bud
- James Viront as Zachariah
- Barbara Katz-Norrod as Mrs. Martinak
- Stan Fitzgerald as The Sandman
- Matthew Jason Walsh as Ozzy
- Mary Wilkerson as Bizzare
- Jennifer Barrett as Bimbo Model
- Lisa Neeld as Bedelia
- Nicholas Cleland as Pugsley
- James L. Edwards as Gerald Rivers
- Lawrence Latsko as Joyner
- George Abrams as Hershberger
- Hal Vandersall as Hooper
- Douglas Bouslough as Merle

== Production ==
The film was shot in Ohio. It marked the first collaboration between Bookwalter and actress Ariauna Albright, who appeared on the box art and served as an associate producer. They were introduced to each other after Walsh had arranged for them to meet. She would later go on to star in several of his films.

== Reception ==
John Thornen of Cinefantastique wrote: "Clever dialogue, solid performances and slick editing...director J.R. Bookwalter has redefined outlaw filmmaking!" Writer Annie Choi wrote that the "real criticism might be that Booklwater set out to create something he thought would have commercial appeal" and that he "certainly doesn't push any boundaries or tread new territory as he has done in the past." She concluded that while the film is "not gory, shocking or outrageous", it is "impressive."

Bill Gibron of DVD Talk rated the film 2 stars out of 5 and wrote: "In truth, there is a lot to appreciate in this movie, from its seedy trailer park backdrop to its title terror. Had a little more attention been paid to those elements that undermine most homemade horror movies – uneven scripting, awkward acting, narrative gaps and production mistakes – we'd have a real winner on our hands." Shock Cinema wrote that Bookwalter "pumps out his movies with all the finesse of a dog taking a dump on the sidewalk" and opined that the film "stumbles on every conceivable level, and doesn’t even have the good sense to pander to the viewer with cheap gore ‘n’ sex."
