= Suffer Little Children (film) =

1983 British film

- DVD cover
- Release date: 1983
- Country: United Kingdom
- Language: English

Suffer Little Children is a 1983 British shot-on-video horror film created by a cast of intergenerational students of South London's Meg Shanks Drama School (with a narrative inspired by films including Carrie, Psycho, Halloween and Mad Max) supervised by director Alan Briggs.

== Summary ==
A reconstruction of unreported events involving Elizabeth, a mute child with demonic powers, arriving at a children's home to terrorize others.

== Home media ==
Previously unavailable except on bootleged VHS copies, Intervision, part of Severin Films, released an official uncut version of the film on DVD on 29 August 2017.

== See also ==
- Analog horror
- Creepypasta
- Video nasty
