= Polymorph (film) =

- Directed by: J. R. Bookwalter
- Written by: J. R. Bookwalter; James L. Edwards
- Produced by: J. R. Bookwalter; David A. Wagner
- Starring: James L. Edwards; Ariauna Albright; Tom Hoover; Sasha Graham; Joseph A. Daw; Jennifer Huss; Pam Zitelli; Leo Anastasio; Pete Jacelone
- Cinematography: J. R. Bookwalter
- Edited by: J. R. Bookwalter
- Music by: Matthew Jason Walsh
- Production company: Suburban Tempe Company
- Distributed by: E.I. Independent Cinema
- Release date: 29 October 1996
- Running time: 87 minutes
- Country: United States
- Language: English

Polymorph is a 1996 American science fiction thriller film directed by J. R. Bookwalter, starring James L. Edwards, Ariauna Albright, Tom Hoover, Sasha Graham, Joseph A. Daw, Jennifer Huss, Pam Zitelli, Leo Anastasio and Pete Jacelone.

== Cast ==
- James L. Edwards as Ted
- Ariauna Albright as Donna
- Tom Hoover as Carlos
- Sasha Graham as Tarper
- Joseph A. Daw as Bill
- Jennifer Huss as Alice
- Pam Zitelli as Regine
- Leo Anastasio as Franco
- Pete Jacelone as Dr. Lester Clark
- Michael Raso as Womeldorf

== Reception ==
Film critic Joe Bob Briggs wrote that the "inspired" dialogue and how "the innocent suffer" allow the film to "rise above the run-of-the-mill shish-kebabbed-campers flick."

Robert Firsching of AllMovie called the film "entertaining and highly watchable."

TV Guide wrote that while the film "may not have too much on its mind", it "puts many higher-budgeted projects to shame for pure entertainment value."

Bill Gibron of DVD Talk rated the film 3 stars out of 5 and wrote that it is "So Bad, It's Good".

Shock Cinema wrote that the film is "Low on budget, but high on predictability".
