= My Brothers' Crossing =

- Poster
- Directed by: Ricky Borba
- Based on: In the Blink of an Eye by J.T. Clark
- Produced by: Tony White; Edna White
- Starring: Daniel Roebuck; James R. Black
- Distributed by: Atlas Distribution
- Release date: September 3, 2020
- Running time: 98 minutes
- Country: United States
- Language: English

My Brothers' Crossing is a 2020 American drama film directed by Ricky Borba and starring Daniel Roebuck and James R. Black. It is based on J.T. Clark's book In the Blink of an Eye.

== Cast ==
- Daniel Roebuck as J.T. Clark
- James R. Black as C.J. Martin

== Production ==
The film was shot in Franklin County, Virginia and Henry County, Virginia.

== Release ==
The film was released on September 3, 2020.
