= Bloodletting (film) =

1997 American horror film

- DVD cover
- Directed by: Matthew Jason Walsh
- Written by: Matthew Jason Walsh
- Starring: James L. Edwards; Ariauna Albright
- Distributed by: Tempe Video
- Release date: 1997
- Country: United States
- Language: English

Bloodletting is a 1997 American direct-to-video horror film written and directed by Matthew Jason Walsh and executive produced by J. R. Bookwalter. The film was shot-on-video, and stars James L. Edwards as Butch Harlow, a serial killer who is blackmailed by young woman Serena Stalin (Ariauna Albright) into taking her on as his apprentice.

Bloodletting was preceded by a 1995 short film, I've Killed Before, also directed by Walsh and starring Edwards and Albright.

== Cast ==
- James L. Edwards as Butch Harlow
- Ariauna Albright as Serena Stalin
- Nina Angeloff as Bobbie Jo
- Sasha Graham as Patti
- Randy Rupp
- Scooter McCrae

== Reception ==
Cinefantastique and Video Movie Guide both commended the performances of the film's cast. A reviewer for Fangoria described Bloodletting as having "a smart script, a playful sense of humor and a solid rapport between the leads", praising its editing and noting "plenty of amusing twists and gruesome FX". John W. Bowen of Rue Morgue called the film "so much more tightly focused than most of its peers", writing: "If microbudget shot-on-vid horror is to remain viable, a lot of filmmakers would do well to study the ways in which Bloodletting compensates for its low production values with solid performances and tight scripting, neither of which costs a dime." The film received moderate praise from critic Joe Bob Briggs, who complimented its gore but asserted that it "ends up with a 'Who will they kill next?' plot that doesn't always hold your attention."

== Home media ==
On August 19, 2003, Bloodletting received a "special edition" DVD release by Tempe Video. In 2022, Tempe Digital and Makeflix restored and released the film on Blu-ray.
