= Beneath the Skin (film) =

- Directed by: Cecelia Condit
- Written by: Cecelia Condit
- Starring: Jill Sands; Jennifer Dunegan; Marian Condit; Mary Jo Toles; Stephen Vogel; Robert Biederman; Lisa Kohn; Judith Allston
- Music by: Karen Skladany, Alice Malloy
- Release date: 1981
- Running time: 11:30
- Country: United States
- Language: English

Beneath the Skin is a 1981 short film created by Cecelia Condit. It follows a woman's thoughts and musings towards a recent incident in which she discovered that her boyfriend was hiding the body of his ex-girlfriend in his closet.

== Background ==
Beneath the Skin is based on a real-life incident that occurred in Condit's life when she dated Ira Einhorn, also known as the Unicorn Killer. Ira had murdered his ex-girlfriend, Holly Maddux, and hidden her corpse in his closet. Condit, who began dating Einhorn, never found Maddux's corpse due to being on medication that hindered her sense of smell.

Condit considers it to be part of the "Jill Sands trilogy", which refers to three of her films which star the actress Jill Sands; Beneath the Skin, Possibly in Michigan, and Not a Jealous Bone.

== Plot ==
The movie follows the narration an unnamed woman recounting a series of events surrounding her four-year relationship with an unnamed man, and how the corpse of his ex-girlfriend was discovered in his apartment after other tenants began to complain of a pungent smell.

== Reception ==
The film was noted for its humorous play with the macabre. Its feminist approach was also commented on.
