= Dan Graham =

American artist (1942–2022)

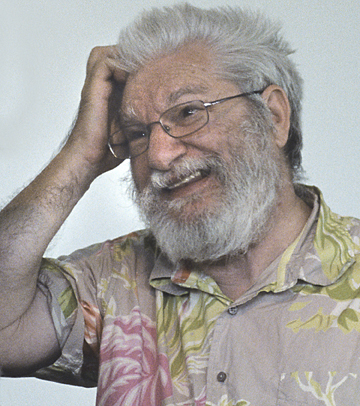
- Graham in 2007 (photo: Monica Boirar)
- Born: March 31, 1942; Urbana, Illinois, U.S.
- Died: February 19, 2022 (aged 79); New York City, U.S.
- Education: Self-taught
- Known for: Conceptual art, installation art, sculpture, photography, writing, video art, performance art, education, art critic, closed-circuit television
- Notable work: Performer/Audience/Mirror, Rock My Religion, Two-way Mirror Cylinder Inside Cube, Don't Trust Anyone Over 30, Yin/Yang
- Movement: Minimalism, conceptual art
- Awards: Coutts Contemporary Art Foundation Award, Skowhegan Medal for Mixed Media, French Vermeil Medal

Daniel Graham (March 31, 1942 – February 19, 2022) was an American visual artist, writer, and curator in the writer-artist tradition. In addition to his visual works, he published a large array of critical and speculative writing that spanned the spectrum from heady art theory essays, reviews of rock music, Dwight D. Eisenhower's paintings, and Dean Martin's television show. His early magazine-based art predates, but is often associated with, conceptual art. His later work focused on cultural phenomena by incorporating photography, video, performance art, glass and mirror installation art structures, and closed-circuit television. He lived and worked in New York City.

== Childhood and early career ==
Dan Graham was born in Urbana, Illinois, the son of a chemist and an educational psychologist. When he was 3, Graham moved from Illinois to Winfield Township, New Jersey, and then to nearby Westfield. He had no formal education after high school and was self-educated. During his teens, his reading included Margaret Mead, Claude Lévi-Strauss, the literary critic Leslie Fiedler, and the French Nouveau Roman writers.

== Work ==
Graham began his art career in 1964, at the age of 22, when he founded the John Daniels Gallery in New York City. He worked there until 1965, when he started creating his own conceptual pieces. During his time at the gallery, he exhibited works by minimalist artists such as Carl André, Sol LeWitt—LeWitt's first solo gallery show, Donald Judd, Robert Smithson, and Dan Flavin. In 1968 Graham's work was published in 0 to 9 magazine, an avant-garde journal that experimented with language and meaning-making.

When making his own work, Graham proved himself to be a wide-ranging post-conceptual artist who worked at the intersection of minimalism and conceptual art. His work consisted of performance art, installations, video, sculpture, and photography. Commissioned work included Rooftop Urban Park Project for which he designed the piece Two-Way Mirror Cylinder Inside Cube and Video Salon (1981–1991). Some other commissions in the U.S. are Yin/Yang at MIT, the labyrinth at the Minneapolis Sculpture Garden, and at Middlebury College, and in Madison Square Park.

Graham's work was always firmly based within conceptual art or post-conceptual art practice. Early examples were photographs and numerological sequences, often printed in magazines, such as Figurative (1965) and Schema (1966). With the latter, Graham drew on the actual physical structure of the magazine in which it is printed for the content of the work itself. As such the same work changes according to its physical/structural location within the world. His early breakthrough-work however was a series of magazine-style photographs with text, Homes for America (1966–67), which counterpoints the monotonous and alienating effect of 1960's housing developments with their supposed desirability and the physical-geometry of a printed article. Graham's other works include Side Effects/Common Drugs (1966) and Detumescence (1966).

After this Graham broadened his conceptual practice with sculpture, performance, film, video including perhaps his best known works Rock My Religion (1984) and Performer/Audience/Mirror (1975). His installations, such as Public Space/Two Audiences (1976) or Yesterday/Today (1975), further inspired his working on indoor and outdoor pavilions. His many conceptual pavilions, including Two Way Mirror with Hedge Labyrinth (1989) and Two Way Mirror and Open Wood Screen Triangular Pavilion (1990), increased his popularity as an artist. Graham's first sculpture building project was Café Bravo at Kunst-Werke Institute for Contemporary Art in Berlin. After a lecture at the Berlin University of the Arts, Klaus Biesenbach invited Graham to conceive the pavilion for Kunst-Werke, which Biesenbach founded, and he assisted Graham in the realization of the project.

=== Influences ===
In Sarah Lehrer-Graiwer's publication Pep Talk in 2009, Graham gave "Artists' and Architects' Work That Influenced Me" (in alphabetical order): Michael Asher, Larry Bell, Flavin, Itsuko Hasegawa, LeWitt, Roy Lichtenstein, Robert Mangold, Bruce Nauman, Claes Oldenburg, Kazuo Shinohara, Michael Snow, Mies van der Rohe, and Robert Venturi.

Writer Brian Wallis said that Graham's works “displayed a profound faith in the idea of the present, [he] sought to comprehend post-war American culture through imaginative new forms of analytical investigation, facto-graphic reportage, and quasi-scientific mappings of space/time relationships.” Graham's work was influenced by the social change of the Civil Rights Movement, The Vietnam War, the Women's liberation movement as well as many other cultural changes. These prolific events and changes in history affected the conceptual art and minimalist movements.

Graham exhibited a predominantly minimalist aesthetic in his earlier photographs and prints. His prints of numeric sequences, words, graphs, and graphics strongly reflect his minimalist qualities. His later works became very conceptual, and examine the relationships between interior space, exterior space, and the perception of the viewer when anticipated boundaries are changed.

=== Photography ===
Soon after he left the John Daniels Gallery, Graham started a series of photographs which began in the nineteen sixties and continued into the early twenty first century. Of his magazine work, Graham said,

There was this whole idea of defeating monetary value in the air in the ’60s, so my idea was to put things in magazine pages where they'd be disposable with no value. And that was a hybrid also because the work was a combination of art criticism and essay: magazine page as an artwork.

These photographs question the relationship between public and private architecture and the ways in which each space affects behavior. Some of his first conceptual works dealt with different forms of printed artwork of numeric sequences. In 1965 Graham began shooting color photographs for his series Homes for America. All the photographs taken were of single-family homes around the American suburbs. This photo series, one of the first artworks in the space of text, was published as a twopage spread in Arts Magazine. The "article" is an assembly of texts including his photographs. The photographs were also chosen for the exhibition "Projected Art" at the Finch College Museum of Art. In 1969, Graham focused on performance and film that explored the social dynamic of the audience, incorporating them into the work, leading to an 80 ft photo series, Sunset to Sunrise.

=== Performance, film, and video ===
From the late 1960s into the late 70's, Graham shifted toward a largely performance-based practice, incorporating film and the new medium of video in his systematic investigations of cybernetics, phenomenology, and embodiment. In 1969, he made his first film Sunset to Sunrise, in which the camera moves opposite to the course of sun, inverting the progression of time. This piece is emblematic of his filmic work that would extend into the early 1970s, in which he would explore “subjective, time-based processes” through perceptual, kinetic exercises, using the camera as an extension of his body and implicating the subjectivity of the viewer. His other films from this period include Two Correlated Rotations (1969), Roll (1970), and Body Press (1970–72), all three featuring the interaction of two cameras or the juxtaposition of two films. Roll (1970) was a performance exercise in phenomenology similar to Bruce Nauman's early films. Body Press, in which a naked man and woman stand back-to-back in a cylinder lined with concave mirrors filming themselves and their distorted reflections, introduces the mirrored image as a prominent theme for Graham, which he would explore extensively in his performance and video practice as well as his later architectural work.

Graham stated that his works are “models to define the limits of an idea of representation as the conventional limits which necessarily define the situation between the artist and spectator,” and his performances in the 1970s foreground this relational approach. In these works Graham explicitly invoked theories of structural linguistics, especially the work of Jacques Lacan. Graham's 1972 performance piece Two Consciousness Projections underscores a preoccupation with phenomenological aspects of relationality, utilizing the reflective capacities of video feedback. In the performance, a woman sits in front of a monitor displaying her image from the live feed of a video camera held by a man behind the monitor and attempts to narrate her conscious mind, while the man describes her as he watches through the camera. This work presents an experiment in self-perception and representation, modulated by numerous mirroring agents—the woman's own image on the monitor, the “image” of her depicted by the man, as well as both performers’ awareness of the audience. In his own writings, Graham articulated an interest in deconstructing the divisions between interior intention and visible behavior formed when looking at one's reflection in a mirror, and proposed video feedback as both a technical and conceptual means by which to achieve this. Many of Graham's performance pieces work to exhibit and exploit the spontaneous interaction between thought and expression, inside and outside, extending this dissolution of barriers to dichotomies of performer and audience, private and public. Graham's most complex interrogation of this is the performance Performer/Audience/Mirror (1977), in which he stood between a large mirror and an audience, describing himself, the audience, his reflection, and the audience's reflection in sequential phases of continuous commentary. Expanding upon the themes in Two Consciousness Projections, this work implicates the audience in their own feedback cycle of self-perception.

Graham produced a number of videos that documented his performance works, such as the 1972 Past Future Split Attention, in which the conversation of two acquaintances becomes a cacophony of simultaneous speech and interruption. One other major example of a documented performance by Graham Performance/Audience/Mirror (1975).

Graham also incorporated video into installations, where he created environments in which video technology is used to alter the viewer's own bodily experience. In 1974, he created an installation with a series of videos called "Time Delay Room", which used time-delayed Closed-circuit television cameras and video projections.

Lastly, Graham produced a number of video documentaries, such as Rock My Religion from (1983–84) and Minor Threat (1983). Rock My Religion (1984) explores rock music as an art form and draws a parallel between it and the development of the Shaker religion in the United States. He observed the changes in beliefs and superstitions in the Shaker religion since the 18th century, and related them to the development of rock culture. The film has been distributed widely, and has included screenings at both institutional and counter-cultural venues across Europe and the U.S., including Lisson Gallery, Auto Italia South East, Whitney Museum of American Art, and Château de Montsoreau-Museum of Contemporary Art. Minor Threat documents the youth culture surrounding the band of the same name. In it, Graham analyses the social implications of this subculture, treating it "as a tribal rite, a catalyst for the violence and frustration of its predominantly male, teenage audience."

=== Pavilions ===
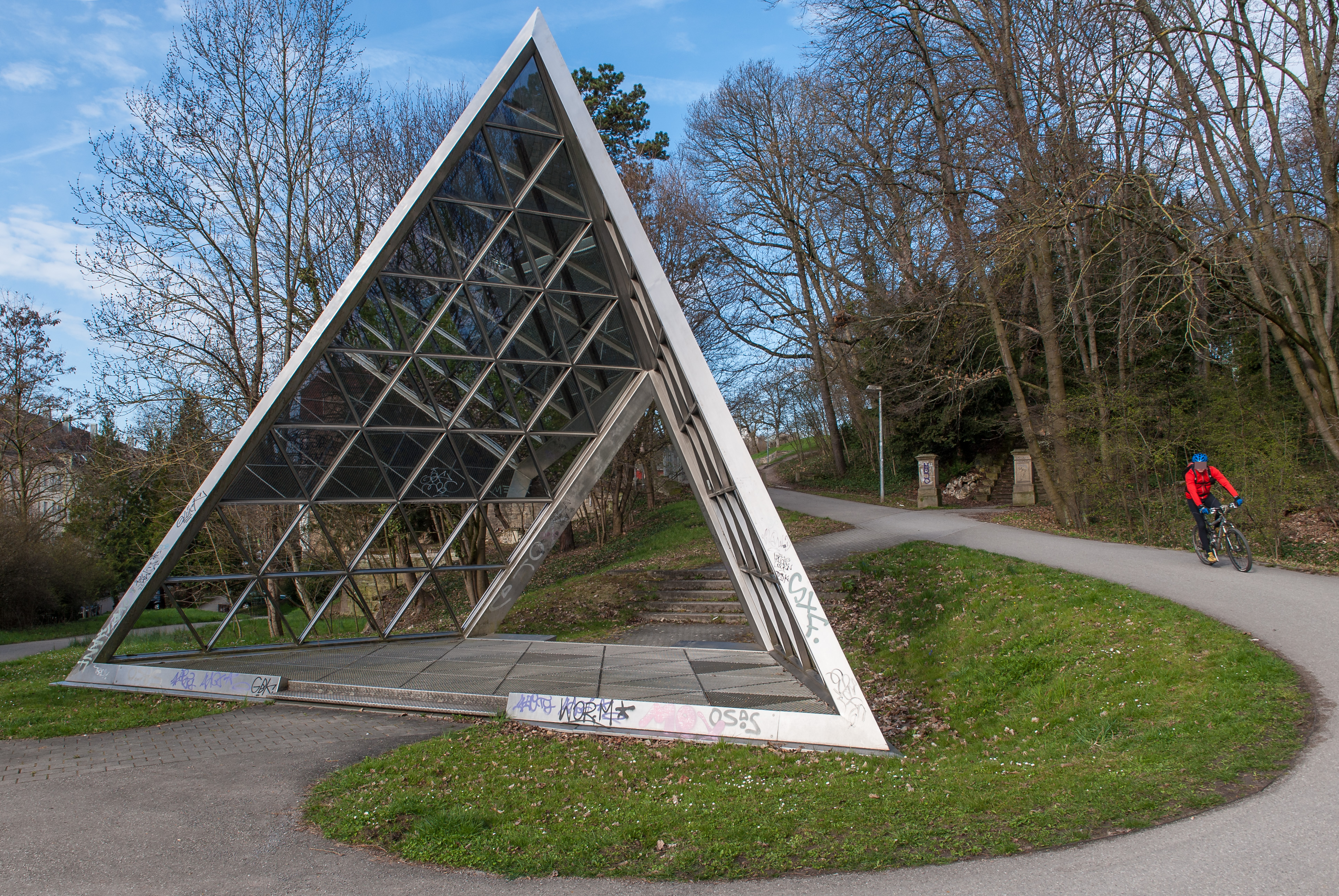
Gate of Hope (1993) in Stuttgart, Germany

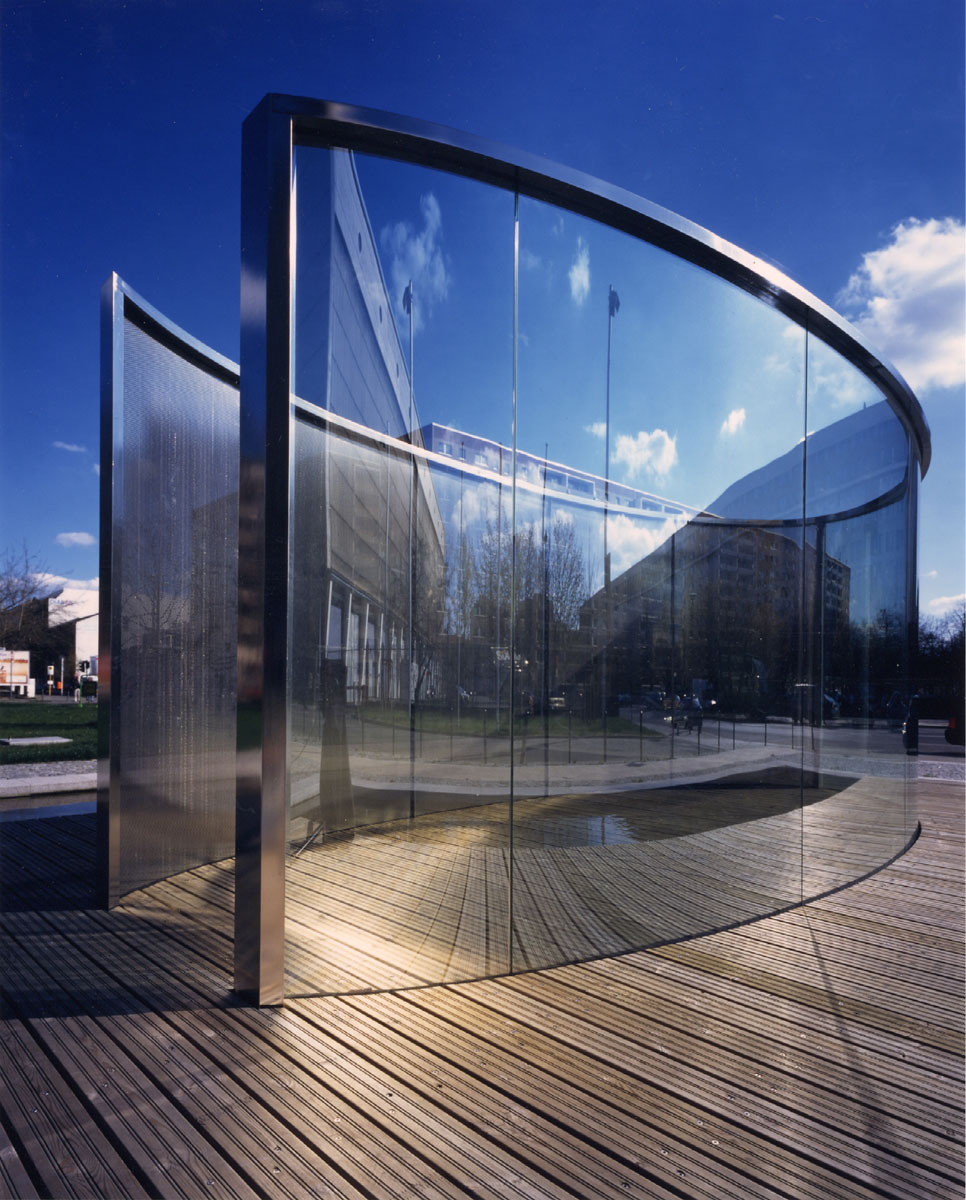
Pavilion in Berlin, Germany

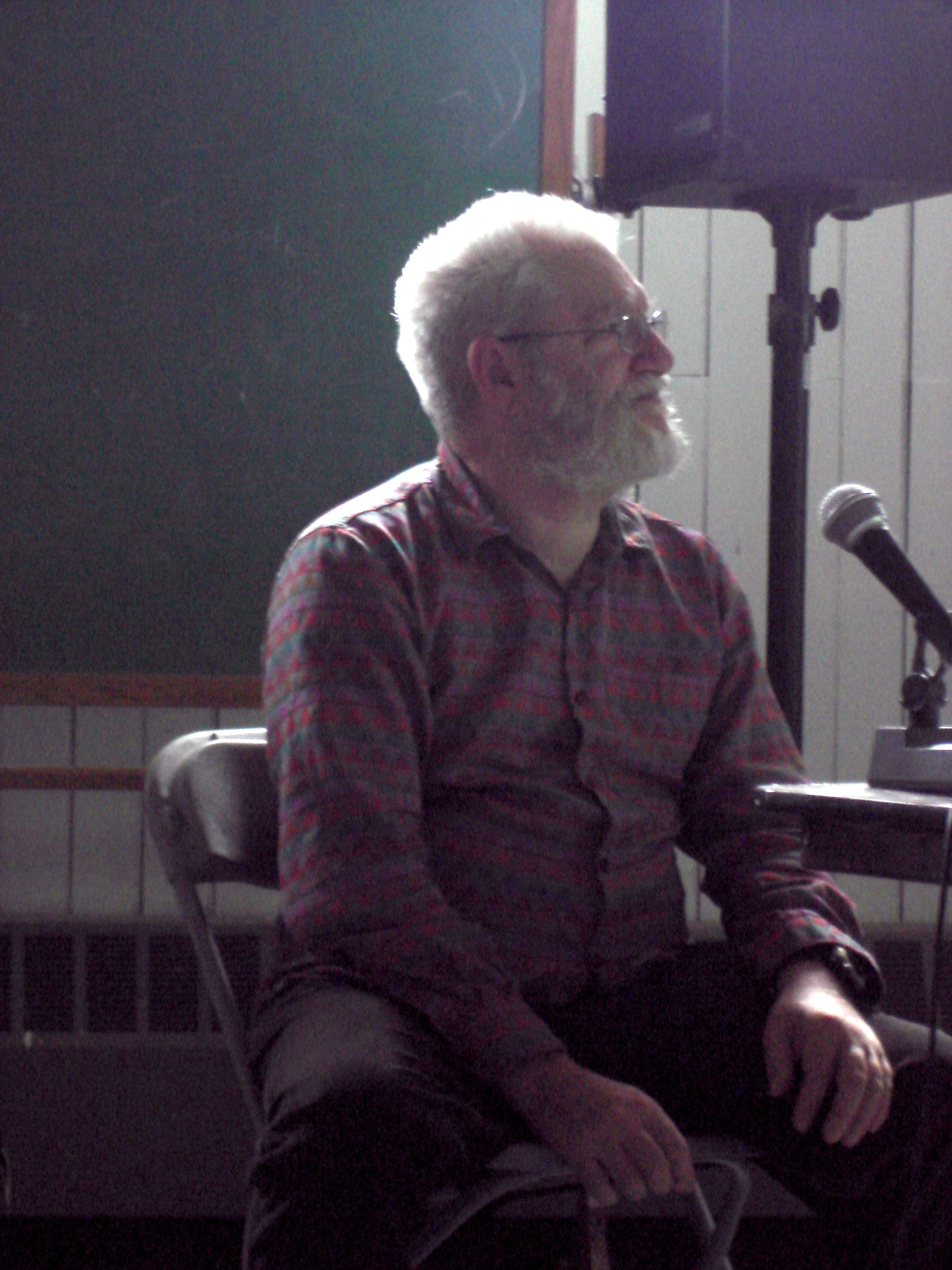
Dan Graham 2007 in Portland

Two-Way Mirror Punched Steel Hedge Labyrinth. Family in a box, Minneapolis photo by Wendy Seltzer

Some of Graham's artworks are said to blur the line between sculpture and architecture. From the 1980s on, Graham worked on an ongoing series of freestanding, sculptural objects called pavilions. Graham's popularity grew after he started his walk-in pavilions and he received commissions all over the world. His pavilions are steel and glass sculptures which create a different space which disorients the viewer from his or her usual surroundings or knowledge of space. They are made of a few huge panes of glass or mirror, or of half-mirrored glass that is both reflective and transparent. Wooden lattice and steel are other materials most commonly used in his work.

The List Visual Arts Center at MIT calls his pavilions rigorously conceptual, uniquely beautiful, and insistently public. The pavilions create a unique experience for the viewer. His pavilions are created for the public experience. His pavilions combine architecture and art. Dan Graham's pavilion works have been compared to Ryue Nishizawa and Kazuyo Sjima's work on the 21st Century Museum of Contemporary Art, Kanazawa. The glass wall of the structure reflects and distorts light much like Graham's sculptures. The layered, but simplistic quality is said to be very much like Graham's. The structures are similar in their study of space and light.

In 1981, Graham started work on a decade long project in New York City. The work Two-Way Mirror Cylinder Inside Cube and Video Salon was part of the Rooftop Urban Park Project. Graham worked on the piece in collaboration with architects Mojdeh Baratloo and Clifton Balch. This transparent and reflective pavilion transformed the roof of 548 West 22nd Street into a rooftop park. The pavilion captures the surrounding landscape and changes of light creating an intense visual effect with the sky. The Two-Way Mirror Cylinder Inside Cube and Video Salon has become one of his most well-known works throughout his art career.

After numerous commissions in Europe, the Children's Pavilion (1988–93) was the first piece Graham was commissioned to do in the United States. A collaboration with Jeff Wall, the pavilion is a conceptual piece relating to the children of the nation. It is a circular shaped room with an oculus that is both transparent and reflective at the top, so the viewers on the outside of the building could look inside as well. Wall's nine circular framed photographs of children belonging to many nationalities and ethnic backgrounds surround the room. Each child is shown half-length and viewed from below against the background of a sky. In each image Wall chooses a different sky. In 1991, the Witte de With Center for Contemporary Art attempted to realise the pavilion in Rotterdam's Ommoord district; the plan was eventually abandoned in 1994. Related works include Children's Pavilion (Chambre d'Amis) (1986), Skateboard Pavilion (1989), and Funhouse for the Children of Saint-Janslein (1997–99).

In 2014, a temporary installation by Graham called Hedge Two-Way Mirror Walkabout (2014) was created on the roof of the Metropolitan Museum of Art in collaboration with the Swiss landscape architect Günther Vogt. The pavilion consists of an S-shaped curve of slightly reflective glass, bookended by two parallel ivy hedgerows. Later, Graham worked with the British fashion designer Phoebe Philo to create an S-shaped steel-and-glass pavilion in which to show her spring/summer 2017 collection.

==== Selected pavilions ====
Other realized pavilions by Graham include:

- Crazy Spheroid – Two Entrances (2011), originally designed for the New York Botanical Garden, now at DeCordova Museum and Sculpture Park, Lincoln, MA;
- Norwegian Wood Lattice Bisected By Curved 2-way-mirror, 2010 on the banks of Lake Lemonsjøen, Norway
- Kaleidoscope/Doubled (2010), La Rochelle, France;
- Half Cylinder/ Perforated Steel Triangular Enclosure, Kortrijk, Belgium;
- Two V's and 2 Half-Cylinders off-Aligned, Brussels, Belgium;
- One Straight Line Crossed by One Curved Line (2009) Novartis HQ, Basel, Switzerland;
- Dhaka Pavilion (2008), Museo Nacional Centro de Arte Reina Sofía, Madrid, Spain;
- Two Half Cylinders (2008) at Bob Rennie's Rennie Collection, Vancouver, BC;
- Half Square/Half Crazy at Casa del Fascio, Como, Italy;
- From Mannerism to Rococo (2007);
- Homage to Vilanova Artigas (2006), the São Paulo Biennial 2006;
- Bisected Triangle, Interior Curve (2002), Inhotim, Brumadinho;
- Bisected Triangle Inside Curve (2002), Madison Square Park, New York;
- Waterloo Sunset (2002–2003), Hayward Gallery, London;
- Yin/Yang Pavilion (1997/2002), MIT, Cambridge, Massachusetts (in Steven Holl's dormitory);
- Two-Way Mirror / Hedge - Almost Complete Circle (2001), K21 Ständehaus, Düsseldorf, Germany;
- S-Curve for St. Gallen (2001), Hauser & Wirth Collection, St Gallen;
- Rivoli Gate Pavilion (2000), Castello di Rivoli, Torino, Italy;
- Curved Two-Way Mirror Triangle, One Side Perforated Steel (2000), Museum of Contemporary Art, Tokyo, Japan;
- Two Different Anamorphic Surfaces (2000), Wanås Castle, Sweden;
- Walkway for Hypo-Bank (1999), Munich, Germany;
- Star of David Pavilion (1999), Tel Aviv Museum of Art;
- Elliptical Pavilion (1995/1999), Vattenfall Europe, Michaelkirchstrasse, Berlin;
- Café Bravo (1998), Kunst-Werke Institute for Contemporary Art, Berlin;
- Two-Way Mirror Curved and Straight and Open Shōji Screen Triangle (1998), Museum Ludwig, Cologne;
- Argonne Pavilion II (1998), private owner
- Triangular Solid With Circular Insert (1997), Chiba City Museum of Art, Hikari, Areba;
- Two Two-Way Mirrored Parallelograms Joined with One Side Balanced Spiral Welded Mesh (1996), National Galleries of Scotland, Edinburgh;
- Two-Way Mirror Curved Hedge Zig-Zag Labyrinth (1996), Middlebury College, Middlebury;
- Two-Way Mirror Triangle with One Curved Side (1996), Vågan, Norway;
- Two-Way Mirror and Punched Aluminum Solid Triangle (1996), originally created for the garden of the Royal Shooting Club in Copenhagen, now at the Arken Museum of Modern Art;
- Parabolic Triangular Pavillon I (1996), Nordhorn;
- Two-Way Mirror Punched Steel Hedge Labyrinth (1994–1996), Walker Art Center, Minneapolis;
- Star of David Pavillon for Schloss Buchberg (1991–1996), Gars am Kamp;
- Double Exposure (1995/2003), initially proposed for a 1995 exhibition in Germany, later installed at Serralves Foundation, Porto;
- Cylinder Bisected by Plane (1995), Benesse House Museum, Naoshima;
- Double Cylinder (The Kiss) (1994), San Francisco Museum of Modern Art;
- New Labyrinth for Nantes (1992–1994), Place Commandant Jean l'Herminier, Nantes;
- Triangular Bridge Over Water (1990), Laumeier Sculpture Park, St. Louis;
- Star of David Pavillon/Triangular Pavilion with Triangular Roof Rotated 45° for Hamburg (1989/99), Hamburg;
- Triangular Solid with Circular Inserts, Variation D (1989), Carnegie Museum of Art, Pittsburgh;
- Triangular Solid with Circular Inserts (1989), Peggy Guggenheim Collection, Venice;
- Triangular Pavilion with Circular Cut-Out (1989–2000), various places;
- Skateboard Pavilion (1989), various places;
- Octagon for Münster (1987), Münster, Germany;
- Two-Way Mirror Pergola Bridge I, Fonds Régional d’Art Contemporain des Pays de la Loire, Clisson, France;
- Pavilion Sculpture II (1984), Moderna Museet, Stockholm, Sweden;
- Rooftop Urban Park Project (1981/91-2004) for Dia:Chelsea, New York;
- Two Adjacent Pavilions (1981), Rijksmuseum Kröller-Müller, Otterlo, Netherlands;
- Pavilion / Sculpture for Argonne (1978–81), Argonne National Laboratory, Argonne, Illinois;
- Gate of Hope (1993), Leibfriedscher Garten, Stuttgart, Germany.

=== Writings ===
Graham produced a notable body of writing. He worked as an art critic, writing revealing articles about fellow artists, art, architecture, video, and rock music. His writings and works are collected in several catalogues and books as "Dan Graham Beyond" (MIT Press 2011), Rock My Religion. Writings and Projects 1965–1990, edited by Brian Wallis and Two Way Mirror Power: Selected Writings by Dan Graham on His Art.

=== Collaborations ===
For the 2007 Performa, Graham designed the stage set made for New York City based band Japanther's performance. Graham collaborated previously with Japanther on the rock puppet opera Don't Trust Anyone Over Thirty: Entertainment by Dan Graham with Tony Oursler and Other Collaborators (2004).

== Personal life and death ==
Graham died in New York City on February 19, 2022, at the age of 79.

== Select artworks ==
- Homes for America, 1967, John Gibson
- Piece, 1969, Cindy Hinant, New York.
- Opposing Mirrors and Video Monitors on Time Delay, 1974, San Francisco Museum of Modern Art.
- Yesterday/Today, 1975, Stedelijk Van Abbe Museum, Eindhoven, the Netherlands.
- Back-Yard New Housing Project, 1978, Lisson Gallery, London.
- Two Way Mirror with Hedge Labyrinth, 1989, Lisson Gallery.
- Pavilion Influenced by Moon Windows, 1989.
- Untitled sculpture, 1996, installed in Vågan, North Norway.
- Triangular Pavilion with Circular Cut-Out Variation C, 1989–2000, Lisson Gallery Swimming Pool/Fish Pond, 1997, Patrick Painter Editions.
- Two Way Mirror with Lattice with Vines Labyrinth, 1998, Lisson Gallery.
- Girls Make-Up Room, 1998–2000, Hauser & Wirth Zürich London.
- Greek Meander Pavilion, Open, 2001, Lisson Gallery.
- Bisected Triangle, Interior Curve, 2002, Madison Square Park.
- Waterloo Sunset at the Hayward Gallery, London, 2002–03.
- Terminal 5 In 2004, the dormant Saarinen-designed TWA Flight Center (now Jetblue Terminal 5) at JFK Airport) briefly hosted an art exhibition called Terminal Five, curated by Rachel K. Ward and featuring the work of 18 artists including Dan Graham. The show featured work, lectures and temporary installations drawing inspiration from the terminal's architecture — and was to run from October 1, 2004, to January 31, 2005 — though it closed abruptly after the building itself was vandalized during its opening gala.
- Sculpture or Pavillion?, 2015, Museum De Pont

== Exhibitions ==
Graham's first solo show was held in 1969 at the John Daniels Gallery in New York. In 1991, an exhibition of his pavilions and photographs was held at the Lisson Gallery in London. Another important exhibition featuring Graham was "Public/Private", an exhibition that traveled to four different venues. The show, which included his pavilions, architectural photographs and models, performances, and video installations, had its opening in 1994 at the Moore College of Art and Design. In 2001, a retrospective was held covering his 35-year career. The museums holding the event included the Musee d'Art Moderne de la Ville in Paris, Kroller-Muller Museum in Otterlo, the Netherlands, and Kiasma Museum in Helsinki, Finland. In 2009, another major retrospective was mounted in the U.S., showing at the Museum of Contemporary Art, Los Angeles; Whitney Museum of American Art, New York and the Walker Art Center, Minneapolis. Graham's work has also been exhibited at the Venice Biennale (1976, 2003, 2004 and 2005), documentas V, VI, VII, IX and X (1972, 1977, 1982, 1992 and 1997), and at Skulptur Projekte Münster '87 and '97.

== Bibliography ==
- Alberro, Alexander and Graham, Dan Dan Graham - Models to Projects (Marian Goodman Gallery 1998) ISBN 0-944219-13-6
- Alberro, Alexander, Dan Graham, and Friedrich W. Heubach. "Dan Graham: Half Square Half Crazy". Barcelona: Poligrafa, Ediciones, S.a., 2001.
- Charre, Alain, Marc Perelman, and Marie-Paule Macdonald. "Dan Graham." Paris: Editions Dis Voir, 1995.
- Dreher, Thomas: Außenwelt im Kubus. In: NIKE, Nr.13/Mai-Juni 1986, p. 39f. (In German)
- Dreher, Thomas: Pavillons. In: das kunstwerk, Februar 1989 (Nr.6/XLI), p. 90s. (In German)
- Dreher, Thomas: Sculptural Models as Bridgeable Historical Metaphors. In: Artefactum, Nr.30/1989, September/October 1989, p. 15-20,48-50 (English translation at the end of the German text)
- Francis, Mark, Beatriz Colomina, Birgit Pelzer, and Dan Graham. "Dan Graham." New York City: Phaidon P, Inc., 2001.
- Graham, Dan Dan Graham Interviews, Dan Graham; (Hatje Cantz 1995) ISBN 3-89322-318-5
- Graham, Dan, Adachiara Zevi, Brian Hatton, and Mark Pimlott. "Dan Graham: Architecture." London: Architectural Association, 1997.
- Graham, Dan, and Adachiara Zevi. "Dan Graham: Half Square Half Crazy". New York City: Charta, 2005.
- Graham, Dan, and Brian Wallis. "Rock My Religion: Writings and Projects" 1965–1990. Boston: MIT P, 1994.
- Graham, Dan. "Two-Way Mirror Power." Boston: MIT P, 1999.
- Graham, Dan, Two-Way Mirror Power: Selected Writings by Dan Graham on His Art, (MIT Press 1999) ISBN 0-262-57130-7
- Graham, Dan, Dan Graham: Catalogue Raisonné, (Richter Verlag 2001) ISBN 3-933807-31-X
- Graham, Dan, Valle, Pietro, Zevi, Adachiara, Dan Graham: Half Square Half Crazy (Charta 2005) ISBN 88-8158-520-0
- Jodidio, Philip. "Architecture: Art." New York: Prestel. 86–87.
- Simpson, Bennett; Iles, Chrissie, eds. (2009). Dan Graham: Beyond. The MIT Press. ISBN 978-1-933751-12-2.
- Smith, Matt Dan Graham's Rock My Religion, The Nonnus Blog. 26 Mar. 2008.
- Wallis, Brian, Rock My Religion: Writings and Projects 1965-1990 by Dan Graham, (MIT Press 1994) ISBN 0-262-57106-4
