= Scott Spiegel =

American film director (1957–2025)

- Born: December 24, 1957; Birmingham, Michigan, U.S.
- Died: September 1, 2025 (aged 67)
- Occupations: Screenwriter, film director, producer, actor
- Years active: 1977–2022

Scott Spiegel (December 24, 1957 – September 1, 2025) was an American screenwriter, film director, producer and actor. He co-wrote the screenplay for Evil Dead II with longtime friend, film director Sam Raimi, with whom he attended Wylie E. Groves High School in Birmingham, Michigan. Spiegel played the role of Scotty in Raimi's Within the Woods, which served as a precursor to The Evil Dead, where Spiegel was replaced by Richard DeManincor (Hal Delrich).

== Early life ==
Spiegel was born on December 24, 1957. He grew up in Birmingham, Michigan. He attended Walnut Lake Elementary School and West Maple Jr. High School, where he met Sam Raimi and Bruce Campbell. Spiegel worked at the grocery market across from Walnut Lake Elementary School.

== Career ==
When Spiegel first moved to Los Angeles, he shared a house with film directors Raimi, Joel Coen and Ethan Coen and actresses Holly Hunter, Frances McDormand and Kathy Bates. He shared yet another house with roommate and film editor Bob Murawski (Spider-Man). In the early 1990s, he introduced film director Quentin Tarantino to producer Lawrence Bender, who helped Tarantino get Reservoir Dogs made.

In 1999, Spiegel directed the direct-to-video sequel From Dusk Till Dawn 2: Texas Blood Money. Spiegel formed the production company Raw Nerve with film directors Eli Roth and Boaz Yakin. Raw Nerve produced the film Hostel (2005), directed by Roth.

== Death ==
Spiegel died of a heart attack on September 1, 2025 at the age of 67. Send Help was dedicated in his memory.

== Filmography ==
Year	Film	Director	Writer	Producer	Actor	Role	Notes
1977	It's Murder!		Yes	Yes	Yes	Detective	Short film
1978	Clockwork				Yes	The Killer	Short film
1979	Attack of the Helping Hand	Yes	Yes	Yes			Short film
1979	Within the Woods				Yes	Scotty	Short film
1980	The Blind Waiter	Yes	Yes	Yes	Yes	Chef	Short film
1982	Cleveland Smith: Bounty Hunter		Yes	Yes	Yes	Native	Short film
1985	Thou Shalt Not Kill... Except		Yes	Yes	Yes	Pin Cushion	
1987	Evil Dead II		Yes				
1989	The Dead Next Door				Yes	Richards	
1989	Intruder	Yes	Yes		Yes	Bread Man	
1989	Robot Ninja				Yes		
1990	The Rookie		Yes				
1990	Lionheart				Yes	Pool Fight Bookie	
1990	Darkman				Yes	Dockworker #5	
1992	The Nutt House	Yes	Yes				Credited as Peter Perkinson
1995	The Quick and the Dead				Yes	Gold Teeth Man	
1999	From Dusk Till Dawn 2: Texas Blood Money	Yes	Yes				
2002	Spider-Man				Yes	Marine Cop	
2004	Spider-Man 2				Yes	Rooftop Pizza Thief	
2004	My Name Is Modesty	Yes					Direct-to-DVD
2005	2001 Maniacs			Yes			
2005	Hostel			Executive			
2007	Hostel: Part II			Executive			
2009	Drag Me to Hell				Yes	Mourner at Death Feast	
2011	Hostel: Part III	Yes		Yes			Direct to DVD
2017	Cain Hill			Executive			Direct to DVD
2019	QT8: The First Eight				Yes	Himself	Documentary
2022	Doctor Strange in the Multiverse of Madness				Yes	Souls of the Damned	Voice
TBA	Spring Break '83	Yes					Filmed in 2010, unreleased
