= Lenke Lorán =

Hungarian actress (1927–2017)

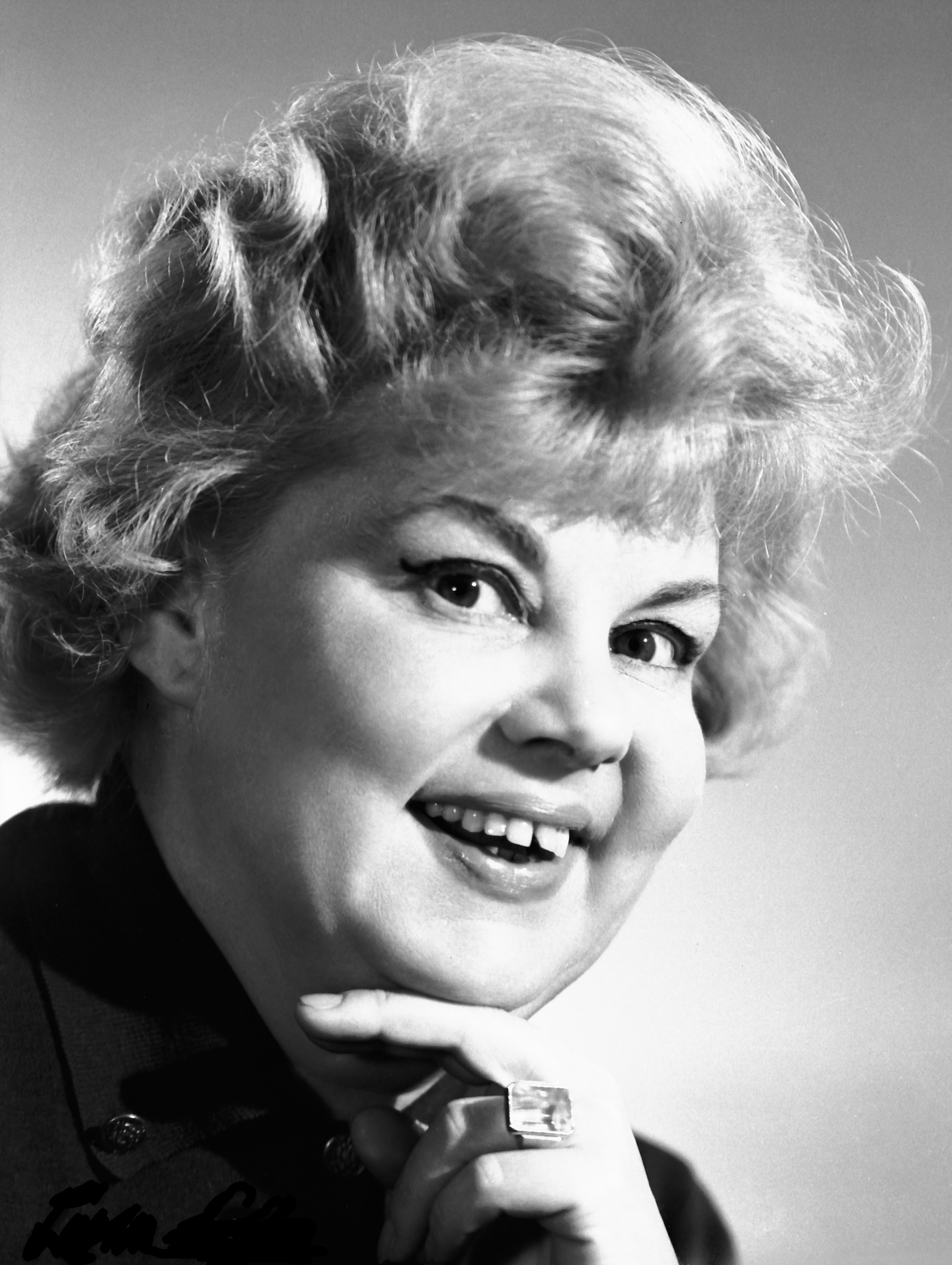
- Lorán in the 1940s
- Born: 1 May 1927; Győr, Hungary
- Died: 27 August 2017 (aged 90); Budapest, Hungary
- Resting place: St. Stephen's Basilica
- Occupation: Actress
- Years active: 1935–2015
- Spouse(s): Dezső Lemhényi (m. 19??; div. 1952); László Kozák (m. 19??; died 1997)
- Children: 1

Lenke Lorán (1 May 1927 – 27 August 2017) was a Hungarian actress. She was born in Győr, Hungary. Her career began in 1935.

Lorán played mostly comedies, but she also performed memorably in more serious films as well. Her best known roles were in Nyári játék, Entanglement, and in 7-es csatorna.

Between 1945 and 1966, she was a member of the Theater of the Hungarian People's Army and the Petőfi Theater. Between 1966 and 1998, she played on the Amusement Stage. Between 1998 and 2011, she was a member of the Microscope Stage. She retired in 2014.

Lorán died of heart failure on 27 August 2017 in Budapest, Hungary at the age of 90.
