= 555 (1988 film) =

1988 American horror film directed and produced by Wally Koz

- Standard Edition DVD released by Massacre Video
- Directed by: Wally Koz
- Written by: Roy Koz
- Story by: Wally Koz
- Produced by: Wally Koz
- Starring: Mara Lynn Bastian; Charles Fuller; Greg Kerouac; Greg Neilson; B.K. Smith; Bob Grabill
- Cinematography: Lamar Bloodworth
- Edited by: Pat Mongoven
- Music by: Frankie Rodriguez
- Production company: King Video Productions
- Distributed by: Slaughterhouse Entertainment
- Release date: 1988 (United States)
- Running time: 80 minutes
- Country: United States
- Language: English

555 is a 1988 American horror film directed by Wally Koz and written by Roy Koz. A direct-to-video release, it stars Mara Lynn Bastian, Charles Fuller, Greg Kerouac, Greg Neilson, B.K. Smith, and Bob Grabill. The plot involves the police searching for a murderous necrophile who, every five years, murders five couples over the course of five nights, with the latest killing spree taking place in Chicago, Illinois.

== Plot ==
On a beach in Chicago, a couple is murdered by a man dressed like a hippie, with the only witness to the crime being Colonel Peter Wayne, a retired veteran of the Vietnam War. Wayne is questioned by Sergeant Connor, Connor's partner, Detective Johnny Haller, and Assistant District Attorney Ralph Kennedy, whose girlfriend, a reporter named Susan Rather, is also investigating the double homicide committed by the so-called "Lakefront Butcher." Over the next two nights, two more couples are murdered by the Lakefront Butcher, who always decapitates the male victims before tying up, torturing, and having sex with the bodies of the female ones, a modus operandi that matches a series of unsolved murders that always involve five couples being killed every five years over the course of five nights, with the earliest known spate of homicides having occurred in 1968 in Springfield, Massachusetts.

When another couple is killed, this time during a home invasion, Colonel Wayne is arrested as the prime suspect after it is discovered he was stationed in two of the other cities terrorized by the Lakefront Butcher. After Colonel Wayne is released due to lack of evidence, Connor and Haller are approached by Susan, who has unearthed information that suggests the Lakefront Butcher is actually Ralph, who has the same birth name, Joseph Ralph Dwyer, as the boyfriend of the first victim killed in Springfield. Ralph's girlfriend cheated on him, so he got revenge by killing her and her lover and has spent the last twenty years recreating the murders as the Lakefront Butcher.

After Ralph kills another couple in an abandoned factory, he is shot to death during a confrontation with Connor and Haller.

== Cast ==
- Mara Lynn Bastian as Susan Rather
- Charles Fuller as Colonel Peter Wayne
- Greg Kerouac as Sergeant Connor
- Greg Neilson as ADA Ralph Kennedy
- B.K. Smith as Detective Johnny Haller
- Bob Grabill as The Lakefront Butcher/Police Officer
- Scott Hermes as Tommy
- Anne Walker as Tommy's Girlfriend
- Richard Orchard as Angie's Boyfriend/Coroner's Attendant
- Christine Cabana as Angie
- Frankie Rodriguez as Vito
- Wally Koz as Captain Luca

== Release ==
Wally Koz distributed the film's 500 VHS tapes through his own distribution company, Slaughterhouse Entertainment, in 1988.

In 2012, the film was rereleased on DVD, in both standard and big box editions, and VHS (in a run limited to fifty copies) by Massacre Video. Louis C. Justin, the owner of Massacre Video, acquired the rights to the film from Roy Koz. A week after negotiations stalled, Justin received an email from Koz, offering him the rights to the film for the price of a new engine, as "the diesel motor on his boat broke." The film's master tape was heavily degraded, so Justin resorted to splicing its usable footage with footage taken from an original VHS copy of 555. Massacre Video reissued the film on Blu-ray in 2024.

== Reception ==
Scott Aaron Stine, author of The Gorehound's Guide to Splatter Films of the 1980s, found the film's acting and "splashy" gore effects unconvincing and wrote, "Being a shot on video production, no one will--or should--have high expectations for this number." Sean Leonard of Horror News criticized many aspects of the film but admitted it was not "by any means a horrible movie" and concluded, "Is it worth paying a lot of money to own? No, not at all. But is it worth a view? Definitely, if for no other reason to appreciate the love of the genre that is evident throughout." Peter Normanton, author of The Mammoth Book of Slasher Movies, gave the film a score of 3/5 and opined that it was "unabashed in its excessive indulgence of misogynistic sleaze and gore" before concluding, "For sure it was low-budget exploitation, but no one could deny the Koz family's boundless enthusiasm." In a retrospective written for Rue Morgue, the film was deemed "so bad it's good" and a "cult classic" due to its prevalent gore, as well as the "blood-spattered boobies, errant boom mikes, mismatched screams and hilarious dialogue."

555 was one of the early direct-to-video films selected for inclusion in the Sterling Memorial Library at the Yale University Library.
