= Chicago Film Society =

The Chicago Film Society (CFS) is a not-for-profit organization dedicated to promoting and preserving celluloid film and celluloid film culture. Widely known for historically informed screenings of 35mm, 70mm, 16mm and 8mm films, the CFS also maintains a film archive and has collaborated on many film restorations.

== Influence ==
The Chicago Film Society plays an acknowledged role in Chicago's cultural life, with screenings frequently featured in prominent lists of highly recommended upcoming events. Michael Phillips of the Chicago Tribune has described them as "invaluable" and praised their "valiant, savvily curated" programming. The Film Society was chosen by NewCity Film in 2017 to be among the "50 Chicago Screen Gems", and co-founder Becca Hall's involvement with the Chicago Film Society was highlighted in the 2012 "People Issue" of the Chicago Reader.

== Projects ==
The Chicago Film Society maintains a large archive of Leader Lady images, has collaborated on the restoration of the Robert Altman film "Corns-a-poppin", cosponsors the annual Chicago Home Movie Day with the Chicago Film Archives and the Chicago Historical Society, and received multiple grants, including National Film Preservation Foundation grants in 2019, 2020, 2021,, 2022, 2023, and 2025 along with a multi-year Andy Warhol Foundation grant in 2022.
