= Mary Jackson (actress) =

American actress (1910–2005)

- Jackson in The Waltons, 1977
- Born: November 22, 1910; Milford, Michigan, U.S.
- Died: December 10, 2005 (aged 95); Los Angeles, California, U.S.
- Education: Western Michigan University
- Occupation: Actress
- Years active: 1950–1997

Mary Jackson (November 22, 1910 – December 10, 2005) was an American character actress whose nearly fifty-year career began in 1950 and was spent almost entirely in television. She is best known for the role of the lovelorn Emily Baldwin in The Waltons and was the original choice to play Alice Horton in the daytime soap opera Days of Our Lives, playing the part in the unaired pilot. The role was instead given to Frances Reid.

== Biography ==
Jackson was born in the village of Milford, Michigan on November 22, 1910. She graduated from Western Michigan University with a bachelor's degree 1932. She worked for one year as a schoolteacher during the Great Depression before pursuing her interest in theatre.

She returned to college, enrolling in Michigan State University's fine arts program and subsequently beginning her performing career in summer stock theatre in Chicago. She embarked on a television career in New York City in the 1950s, during the first Golden Age of Television, before beginning work in Hollywood in the 1960s.

Jackson appeared on Broadway in such hits as “Kiss and Tell” and “Eastward in Eden,” was standby for Wendy Hiller in “Flowering Cherry” on Broadway, playing the role twice. She toured nationally in “Apple of His Eye” with Edward Arnold, and in “The Heiress” with Basil Rathbone. Jackson was a member of the Chicago company of Tennessee Williams' “Garden District” and also toured with the play; was featured with Shirley Booth in Chicago in “The Desk Set.” (Jackson would later be a guest star on Booth's TV show, Hazel.) Her many stock engagements included the Ann Arbor Spring Festival, Bucks County Playhouse, Ogunquit Playhouse, Alley Theatre in Houston. For the 1962 and 1963 Summer stock seasons she performed at the Elitch Theatre.

Always close to her Michigan roots, Jackson was a charter member of the Milford Historical Society. In 1988, Jackson was instrumental in raising money to rebuild the Oak Grove Cemetery Bridge over the Huron River - a bridge that connects her hometown of Milford to its oldest burial grounds.

Jackson was married to Griffin Bancroft Jr. on July 4, 1937. She died from Parkinson's disease in Los Angeles, two and a half weeks after her 95th birthday.

== Select filmography ==
=== 1950s ===
- The Philco Television Playhouse (1952, TV Series) as Aunt Edna
- Robert Montgomery Presents (1955–1956, TV Series) as Mrs. Gross
- Alfred Hitchcock Presents (1956, TV Series) (Season 1 Episode 36: "Mink") as Mrs. J. Wilson

=== 1960s ===
- General Electric Theater (1960, TV Series) as Phyllis Barton
- The Barbara Stanwyck Show (1960, TV Series) as Mrs. Krieger
- Route 66 (1961, TV Series) as Judge Mary Lindstrom
- Hazel (1961, TV Series) as Flora Duncan
- My Three Sons (1961–1962, TV Series) as Irene / Selena Bailey
- Stoney Burke (1962, TV Series) as Mrs. Carrol
- The Twilight Zone (1963, TV Series, Episode: "Of Late I Think of Cliffordville") as Miss Pepper (uncredited)
- The Andy Griffith Show (1964–1966, TV Series) as Miss Vogel / Mrs. Parnell Rigsby
- The Outer Limits (1964, TV Series) as Mrs. McCrae
- The Fugitive (1964–1966, TV Series) as Carolyn Fletcher / Nurse Oberhansly / Ellie Parker
- Please Don't Eat the Daisies (1965, TV Series) as Mrs. MacIntyre
- The F.B.I. (1965–1972, TV Series) as Ruth Mason / Nurse / Mrs. Dreiser / Mrs. Corman / Mrs. Howard / Mrs. Otto Foshay
- Do Not Go Gentle Into That Good Night (1967) as Mrs. Stone
- Insight (1967, TV Series)
- The Second Hundred Years (1967, TV Series) as Mother Superior
- The Invaders (1967–1968, TV Series) as Hattie Willis / Nurse
- Targets (1968) as Charlotte Thompson
- Lancer (1969, TV Series) as Harpy / Maude Bigelow

=== 1970s ===
- Airport (1970) as Sister Felice
- Mary Tyler Moore (1971, TV Series) as Mrs. Arnell
- The Name of the Game (1971, TV Series) as Jaimie White
- Wild Rovers (1971) as Sada's Mother
- Cannon (1971, TV Series) as Mrs. Wells
- The Failing of Raymond (1971, TV Movie) as Latin Teacher
- Return to Peyton Place (1972, TV Series) as Nell Abernathy (1973–1974)
- The Trial of the Catonsville Nine (1972) as Witness
- The Waltons (1972–1981, TV Series) as Emily Baldwin
- Kid Blue (1973) as Mrs. Evans
- Blume in Love (1973) as Louise
- Barnaby Jones (1973–1977, TV Series) as Mary Jackson / Hilda Forbes / Karen's Landlady
- Our Time (1974) as Miss Moran
- The Rookies (1974, TV Series) as Mrs. Callender / Woman
- Fun with Dick and Jane (1977) as Jane's Mother
- Audrey Rose (1977) as Mother Veronica
- The Bionic Woman (1977, TV Series) as Martha
- Coming Home (1978) as Fleta Wilson
- Letters from Frank (1979, TV Movie) as Edna Miller
- The Rockford Files (1979, TV Series) as Postal Supervisor

=== 1980s ===
- A Small Killing (1981, TV Movie) as Rose
- Hart to Hart (1981, TV Series) as Phony Grandma
- A Wedding on Walton's Mountain (1982, TV Movie) as Emily Baldwin
- Quincy The Flight of the Nightingale (1982, TV Series) as Mrs. Shanley
- Between Two Brothers (1982, TV Movie) as Eddy Frazer
- Some Kind of Hero (1982) as Frances
- A Day for Thanks on Walton's Mountain (1982, TV Movie) as Emily Baldwin
- Family Ties (1982, TV Series) as Edna
- Magnum, P.I. (1983, TV Series) as Grandmother MacKenzie
- Hardcastle and McCormick (1983, TV Series) as Sarah Wicks
- The Snow Queen (1985, TV Series) as Grandmother
- Space (1985, TV Mini-Series) as Frankie
- Scarecrow and Mrs. King (1985–1986, TV Series) as Lois Mendelson
- The Jeffersons (1985, TV Series) as Mrs. Donahue
- My Town (1986, TV Series) as Mrs. McDaniel
- Highway to Heaven (1986, TV Series) as Rose
- Hill Street Blues (1987, TV Series)
- Hunter (1987, TV Series) as Clara
- Big Top Pee-wee (1988) as Mrs. Dill
- L.A. Law (1989, TV Series) as Mrs. Weedon

=== 1990s ===
- Parenthood (1990–1991, TV Series) as Great Grandma Greenwell
- Skinned Alive (1990) as Crawldaddy
- The Exorcist III (1990) as Mrs. Clelia
- Criminal Behavior (1992, TV Movie) as Mrs. Cline
- Leap of Faith (1992) as Emma Schlarp
- A Walton Thanksgiving Reunion (1993, TV Movie) as Emily Baldwin
- Christy (1994, TV Series) as Aunt Polly Teague
- A Walton Wedding (1995, TV Movie) as Emily Baldwin
- Ozone (1995) as Cleaning Lady
- A Family Thing (1996) as Carrie
- A Walton Easter (1997) as Emily Baldwin (final film role)
