= Video Violence =

1987 horror film

- Directed by: Gary Cohen
- Written by: Gary Cohen; Paul Kaye
- Starring: Gary Schwartz; Chick Kaplan
- Distributed by: Camp Video
- Release date: December 2, 1987
- Running time: 90 minutes
- Country: United States
- Language: English
- Budget: Unknown ($6 according to Cohen)

Video Violence, also known as Video Violence... When Renting is Not Enough, is a 1987 American horror film directed by Gary Cohen and starring Gary Schwartz and Chick Kaplan. The film was shot entirely on a VHS camcorder.

== Cast ==
- Gary Schwartz as 1st Store Owner
- Chick Kaplan as 2nd Store Owner
- Robin Leeds as Customer
- Paige Price as 1st Victim
- Kevin Haver as Rick Carlson
- Art Neill as Steven Emory
- Bill Biach as 1st Yokel
- Uke as Eli
- Bart Sumner as Howard
- Joseph Kordos as Reggie Hobbs
- Chris Williams as Desk Sergeant
- William Toddie as Chief of Police
- Jackie Neill as Rachel Emory
- Ricky Kotch as Young Boy
- Jennifer Biach as Dog
- Bonnie Schedin as Young Actress
- Madison Schedin as Baby
- Judy Seplowin as Lori Edwards
- Karen Oujo as 2nd Yokel
- Linda Herman as Mrs. Carlson
- Cara Biach as Secretary
- Joann Poll as Telephone Operator
- O. Selig Stokes as Fraud Hobbs
- Susan Speidel as 3rd Yokel
- Marci Garfinkel as 4th Yokel
- Jerry Kopf as Man in Jeep
- Christa Somma as 1st Girl in Jeep
- Susan Stern as 2nd Girl in Jeep
- Mike Yonone as Patrolman
- Barbara Brunnquell as Old Lady
- Bob Brunnquell as Deli Owner
- Richard 'Dick' Haig as Deli Assistant
- Ray Clark as Home Owner
- Ellen Dreyer as Legless Girl
- Lori Andres as 5th Yokel
- David Christopher as Vampire
- Richard Johnson as Young Man
- Lisa Cohen as Joanna Barker

== Production ==
Writer and director Gary Cohen came up with the idea for the film while working as a video store clerk. A fan of the Golden Age of Hollywood, he was disheartened by the fact that horror films, particularly slashers, were the most popular films among his clientele. The idea for the film came about one afternoon when a young mother with her children asked if the film I Dismember Mama contained any sex. Cohen informed her that he was unsure about the film's sexual content but that he knew it contained graphic violence. The woman decided to rent the film, telling Cohen that as long as the film was devoid of sex, she considered it appropriate viewing for her children. The same exchange occurs in Video Violence, concerning the film Blood Cult.

Cohen had initially secured the use of a local access television station to edit the film over the course of two six-hour shifts. When the station owner found out that Cohen was editing a horror film, he reneged on the agreement and only permitted Cohen the use of the station for two hours during the second shift. After the film's editing was complete, Cohen shopped it around to multiple distributors, only two of which responded. Cohen sold the rights to Camp Video because they were the only ones to offer to design video box art.

Cohen has claimed that the film had a budget of $6.

== Release ==
Video Violence was first released in 1987 and per Brian Albright, was "one of the most widely distributed SOV horror films of the era". The movie's video jacket featured an endorsement from the parody religious group, the Church of the SubGenius, and the claim that Camp Video released "more movies by low-budget auteur Ray Dennis Steckler than anyone else in the world."

In 2007, Camp Motion Pictures released the film on special edition DVD including the sequel Video Violence 2. Cohen also directed a sequel: Video Violence 2 as well as Captives, shot between the two VV films. All three have since been re-released by Camp Video as part of their Basement collection. Video Violence has been screened several times at Alamo Drafthouse Cinema locations as part of film festivals and retrospectives such as the 2018 film festival VHStival in Raleigh and the "Killer Tapes and Shattered Screens" series in Yonkers.

In 2013 Cohen screened Video Violence: Redux Deluxe, a mashup of the first two films, at the Cinedelphia Film Festival.

In 2022, boutique label TerrorVision released Video Violence on a Blu Ray 2-pack with the sequel.

=== Soundtrack ===
The film score for Video Violence was released in 2020 through Graveface Records's Terror Vision imprint. The label also held a limited screening of the film in October of the same year.

== Reception ==
Bleeding Skull reviewed the film in 2018, stating that it "should be admired for its prominence in SOV history, rather than its actual entertainment value." A reviewer for DVD Talk was highly critical, writing "a big, fat, hairy, parasite-infested and pus laden set of sores on anyone who believed that this pair of productions had any meaningful motion picture merit whatsoever". The Oklahoma Gazette reviewed both Video Violence and its sequel as part of a set released by Camp Motion Pictures, noting that the first film "takes itself seriously, whereas 'Video Violence 2' somehow realized there was a joke at stake, and it was past time to get into it."

Cohen has referred to Video Violence as "a piece of wonderful, campy trash".
