= James R. Black =

American actor and football player (born 1962)

James Black
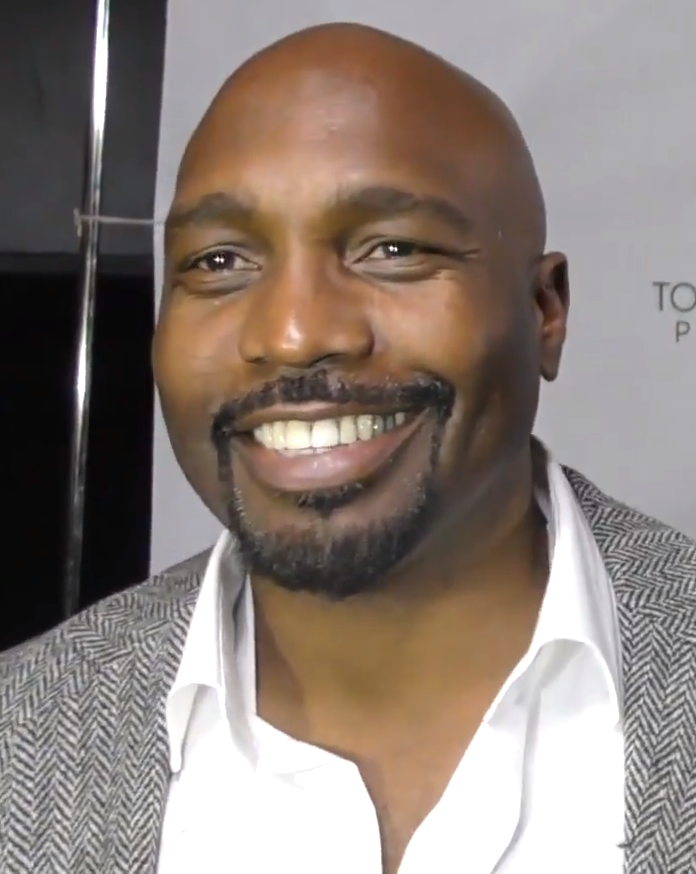
- Black in 2016
- Born: James Richard Black; April 3, 1962 (age 64); Lima, Ohio, U.S.
- Occupations: Actor, football player
- Years active: 1987–present
- Football career

No. 35
- Position: Running back

Personal information
- Listed height: 5 ft 11 in (1.80 m)
- Listed weight: 198 lb (90 kg)

Career information
- High school: Dover (OH)
- College: Akron
- NFL draft: 1984: undrafted

Career history
- Cleveland Browns (1984)

Awards and highlights
- 2x First-team All-OVC; Ohio Valley Conference Offensive Player of the Year (1983)
- Stats at Pro Football Reference

James Richard Black (born April 3, 1962) is an American actor and former professional football player.

== Early life ==
Black was born in Lima, Ohio. He attended Dover High School in Dover, Ohio, where he was a star athlete. He graduated in 1980.

== College career ==
Black played college football for Akron. He was named the Ohio Valley Conference Offensive Player of the Year as a senior in 1983 after leading the conference in rushing with 1,568 yards. In a November 5, 1983, game against Youngstown State, Black set the Akron school record for rushing yards in a game when he rushed 40 times for 246 yards. In his final college game, on November 19, he set conference and school records for most rushing attempts in a game with 52. He was named an Associated Press honorable mention Division I-AA All-American after the season, and finished his college career as Akron's all-time rushing leader with 3,054 yards.

== Professional career ==
Black signed with the Cleveland Browns as an undrafted free agent on May 5, 1984, after also receiving interest from the Green Bay Packers, New York Giants, and New York Jets. He was waived before the start of the regular season during final roster cuts on August 20, 1984, but was re-signed on November 7, 1984. He played in two games for the Browns in 1984, becoming the first Akron football player to play in the NFL. He was waived by the Browns on November 24, 1984. He re-signed with the Browns after the season, but was waived during training camp on August 5, 1985.

== Acting career ==
Black may be best known for his leading role as Agent Michael Hailey on the UPN science fiction drama The Burning Zone. He has also had roles in numerous other television series and films. His television appearances include V.I.P., Fashion House, Anger Management, All of Us, Star Trek: Deep Space Nine, Strong Medicine, Tyler Perry's House of Payne, Six Feet Under, Burn Notice, "The Closer", and Murder in Mexico: The Bruce Beresford-Redman Story

In motion pictures, he had the leading role of Victor Erickson in the 1998 direct-to-video film Cappuccino, the screenplay of which was based upon a story by author Eric Jerome Dickey. Black has also appeared in The Replacements, Out of Sight, Love and a Bullet, and Universal Soldier: The Return. He portrayed boxer Earnie Shavers in the HBO TV movie Don King: Only in America.

== Filmography ==
=== Film ===
Year	Title	Role	Notes
1991	A Triumph of the Heart: The Ricky Bell Story	Special Ed Teacher	TV movie
1991	Hard Promises	Gameshow Husband	
1991	Zombie Cop	Doctor Death	
1992	Maximum Impact	Mr. Huntsacker	Video
1992	The Windy City	Marco	
1992	Galaxy of the Dinosaurs	Kronik	
1992	Chickboxer	Colt Jackson	
1993	Ozone	Eddie Boone	
1994	Witness to the Execution	Chaplain	TV movie
1994	The Chase	Finale Cop 2	
1995	With Criminal Intent	FBI Agent Johnson	
1995	Scot-free	Edwards	
1997	Don King: Only in America	Ernie Shavers	TV movie
1998	Surface to Air	Captain Slocomb	
1998	Godzilla	Soldier	
1998	Out of Sight	Himey	
1998	Cappuccino	Victor Erickson	
1998	Soldier	Riley	
1998	The First 9½ Weeks	Maurice Boudreau	Direct-to-video film
1999	Universal Soldier: The Return	Sergeant Morrow	
1999	Standing on Fishes	Henry	
1999	The Substitute 3: Winner Takes All	Rahmel	TV movie
2000	The Replacements	Ref #3	
2000	Odessa	Leonard	Short
2000	Unshackled	Doc	
2000	Stop It, You're Killing Me	Eric Jameson	
2001	Horrorvision	Bradbury	Video
2001	The Vault	Bradbury	Video
2002	Love and a Bullet	Vaughn	
2004	In Your Eyes	Will	
2004	Mean Jadine	New Ron	Short
2004	Roscoe's House of Chicken n Waffles	Tooky	Video
2005	One More Round	Ronny "Super Ron"	
2005	Pinkerton	Detective Jack Garver	Short
2006	Restraining Order	Dexter	
2006	Saturday Night Life	The Admirer	Short
2007	Agenda	Four Shure	
2007	Spin	James	Short
2008	The Pitch	Peter	Short
2008	The Mortgage Guy	Captain Henry	Short
2008	3 Days Gone	Teddy Shark	Video
2009	Afro Ninja	Black Lightning	Video
2011	Detention	Coach Cooper	
2011	King of the Underground	Mr. Hollywood	
2011	Repeat Offenders: Jamais Vu	Mason	
2012	The Perfect Fit	Party Friend	Short
2012	The Phoenix Rises	Bob Smith	
2012	Boosters	-	
2014	Crossroads	Capricorn Diego	
2015	Why She Cries	Chris Owens	
2015	Beautiful Thorn	Devon	Short
2015	Her First Black Guy	Winston	Short
2015	Welcome to the Family	Preston	TV movie
2015	Murder in Mexico: The Bruce Beresford-Redman Story	Dorian	TV movie
2015	The Man in 3B	Ben	
2016	Black Tar Road	Jimmy	
2016	Virtual High	Andy	Short
2016	Better Criminal	Detective Albert Pierce	
2016	90 Minutes of the Fever	-	
2016	Legends of the Hidden Temple	Tourist	TV movie
2017	The Preacher's Son	Deacon Emerson	
2018	The Choir Director	Deacon Emerson	
2018	Dr. Sugar	CJ	Short
2019	After We Leave	Carrington	
2019	The Thin Orange Line	Detective Hart	Short
2020	Three Days Gone: Based on the Life of Lucas Snow	Teddy Shark	Short
2020	My Brothers' Crossing	CJ Martin	
2021	Writing Around the Christmas Tree	Irving Leighton	TV movie
2022	Boosters LA	HNIC	
2022	Uncommon Negotiator	Chief Wells	Short
2023	Lethal Legacy	James	

=== Television ===
Year	Title	Role	Notes
1987	Houston Knights	Suspect	Episode: "Mirrors"
1995	Walker, Texas Ranger	John Halbert	Episode: "Trust No One"
1995	Living Single	Orville	Episode: "Come Back Little Diva"
1996	Renegade	Orlando Missions	Episode: "Hound Downtown"
1996	Babylon 5	Security Guard #1	Episode: "Voices of Authority"
1996	Sisters	Orderly	Episode: "A Little Snag"
1996	Space: Above and Beyond	Security Operator	Episode: "The Angriest Angel"
1996	Silk Stalkings	Tony Stockton	Episode: "Body Electric"
1996	Pacific Blue	Johnny Lane	Episode: "No Man's Land"
1996	The Sentinel	Antoine Hollins	Episode: "The Debt"
1996	Star Trek: Deep Space Nine	Helmsman	Episode: "Shattered Mirror"
1996	Women: Stories of Passion	Police Officer	Episode: "Gun Shy"
1996	Night Stand	Wrigley	Episode: "Affirmative Action Show"
1996–97	The Burning Zone	Agent Michael Hailey	Main Cast
1997	The Wayans Bros.	D.J.	Episode: "Prom Fright"
1997	Mike Hammer, Private Eye	Security Guard	Episode: "A Penny Saved"
1998	Nash Bridges	Tommy-Kareem	Episode: "Cuda Grace"
1999	Martial Law	David	Episode: "Painted Faces"
1999	For Your Love	Firefighter	Episode: "The Height of Passion"
1999	The Pretender	Sgt. Reed	Episode: "Survival"
1999	V.I.P.	Elwood Snow	Episode: "The Quick and the Dead"
1999–2001	The PJs	Tarnell (voice)	Recurring Cast
2001	Sheena	Shakoro	Episode: "Cult of One"
2001	JAG	Capt. Tripp	Episode: "Measure of Men"
2001	Will & Grace	Anthony Dukane	Episode: "Prison Blues"
2001	Hollywood 7	Chairman Gordon	Recurring Cast
2002	One on One	Black Gold Member	Episode: "Me & My Shadow"
2002	Son of the Beach	Busta Hyman	Episode: "In the Line of Booty"
2003	Strong Medicine	Joey	Episode: "Intensive Care" & "Degeneration"
2003	10-8: Officers on Duty	Xavier	Episode: "Mercy, Mercy Me"
2003	NCIS	Crewman	Episode: "Sub Rosa"
2004	Charmed	Swarm King	Episode: "Used Karma"
2004	CSI: Miami	DEA Agent Brody	Episode: "Invasion"
2004	Summerland	Dalton	Episode: "The Grass Is Greener Than You Think"
2004	Six Feet Under	Duane	Recurring Cast: Season 4
2004	Malcolm in the Middle	Sgt. Rick	Episode: "Reese Comes Home"
2004	The Young and the Restless	Cop #1	Episode: "Episode #1.8026" & "#1.8027"
2005	Listen Up	Jevon	Episode: "Ebony and Irony"
2005	The Bad Girl's Guide	Warren	Episode: "The Guide to Baby Talk"
2006	The Closer	Detective Lawrence Xavier	Episode: "Blue Blood"
2006	Twenty Good Years	George	Episode: "The Elbow Incident"
2006	Fashion House	Rodney	Recurring Cast
2007	Lincoln Heights	David	Episode: "Obsession"
2007	CSI: NY	Luther Vandeross	Episode: "A Daze of Wine and Roaches"
2007	All of Us	Benjamin Thibodeaux	Recurring Cast: Season 4
2008	Bones	Chief Jack Cutler	Episode: "Player Under Pressure"
2008	Shark	Jerry Davis	Episode: "Leaving Las Vegas"
2008	Criminal Minds	Sacramento PD	Episode: "Catching Out"
2008	The Starter Wife	Felix Soel	Recurring Cast
2009	Burn Notice	Jean Pierre Duman	Episode: "Truth and Reconciliation"
2009	Trust Me	-	Episode: "Way Beyond the Call"
2009	Tyler Perry's House of Payne	Reverend Jordan	Episode: "Payne Speaking"
2010	Southland	Detective Roberts	Episode: "Maximum Deployment"
2011	Desperate Housewives	Alan	Episode: "And Lots of Security..."
2011	Cursed	Gerrard Washington	Main Cast
2011–13	Necessary Roughness	Kojo Liberty	Guest Cast: Season 1–2
2012	CSI: Crime Scene Investigation	Jackory	Episode: "Willows in the Wind"
2012–14	Anger Management	Cleo/Derek	Recurring Cast
2013	Castle	Darius Carson	Episode: "Under the Influence"
2014	NCIS: Los Angeles	Lee Stevens	Episode: "SEAL Hunter"
2015	Scorpion	Agent Miller	Episode: "Charades"
2015	Rizzoli & Isles	Ernie Priest	Episode: "A Bad Seed Grows"
2016	Lady Dynamite	Richard	Episode: "A Vaginismus Miracle"
2017	NCIS: New Orleans	Special Agent Perkins	Episode: "Hell on the High Water"
2017	Lethal Weapon	Benny Barns	Episode: "Unnecessary Roughness"
2018	Five Points	Coach Magee	Episode: "Everybody Knows"
2018–22	The Family Business	Rob	Main Cast: Season 1, Recurring Cast: Season 2 & 4, Guest: Season 3
2019–21	All American	Reggie Cooper	Recurring Cast: Season 1, Guest: Season 2 & 4
2020	Two Degrees	JB	Episode: "Dr. Abigail & Me"
2020	Sydney to the Max	Henry	Episode: "Slurping with the Enemy"
2020	Days of Our Lives	Luca	Recurring Cast
