= Ozone (film) =

1993 film by J. R. Bookwalter

- Directed by: J. R. Bookwalter
- Written by: J. R. Bookwalter; David A. Wagner
- Produced by: J. R. Bookwalter; Scott P. Plummer; Douglas Snauffer; David A. Wagner
- Starring: James R. Black; Tom Hoover; James L. Edwards; Bill Morrison; Mary Jackson
- Cinematography: J. R. Bookwalter (as Lance Randas)
- Edited by: J. R. Bookwalter
- Music by: Jens C. Moller
- Distributed by: Suburban Tempe Company
- Release date: June 20, 1993 (United States)
- Country: United States
- Budget: $3,500

Ozone is a 1993 American independent horror film written, produced, and directed by J. R. Bookwalter. The film stars James R. Black, Tom Hoover, James L. Edwards, Bill Morrison, and Mary Jackson.

== Plot ==
While on a stake out with his partner, Detective Eddie Boone is stabbed with a needle containing a new street drug called "ozone". Boone has to fight the narcotic's effects in an effort to find his now missing partner while trudging through a city full of mutated "ozone" addicted vagrants who answer to a drug king pin known as Sam DeBartolo.

== Cast ==
- James R. Black as Eddie Boone
- Tom Hoover as Mike Weitz
- James L. Edwards as Sam DeBartolo / "Spikes"
- Bill Morrison as Richter / "Stitches"
- Mary Jackson as Cleaning Lady

== Production ==
Unhappy with the results after making a series of six unsuccessful shot on video films between August 1991 and March 1992 for a total of $15,000 from Cinema Home Video, director J. R. Bookwalter along with producer David A. Wagner wrote and self-financed what would become Ozone in 1993; the film was shot on S-VHS-C in Akron Ohio with a budget of $3,500.

== Release ==
Ozone was released on VHS in 1993 by Suburban Tempe Company and later on DVD by Tempe Entertainment. The film was completely remastered from its source material for a collector's edition Blu-ray release in 2020.

== Reception ==
Film Threat wrote, "Those who have had any doubts about Tempe's films should see this movie and put those feelings to rest. This is the one that proves what Tempe and its crew is capable of achieving when working with the right script and actors. For a company that has had its share of misses, this is a solid hit."

In a review by Horror Society, Blacktooth wrote, "Drugs that kill people or turn them into mindless drones/zombies is nothing new, especially by the mid-90s, but once you throw in the Tempe Video style you get an oozing mess of sci-fi horror that genre fans of the video store age will truly appreciate."

== Legacy ==
Ozone placed at #46 on Bleeding Skull's "Bleeding Skull 50: The Best Shot-On-Video Films" list.
