= Rock My Religion =

Artistic documentary about rock music and religion

Rock My Religion is a 1984 no wave experimental art film by Dan Graham. It is also the title of a collection of essays written by Dan himself from 1965 to 1990.

== Form and content ==
Created between 1982 and 1984 using television archives, the film is primarily made up of photographic and audiovisual montage and contains original music by Glenn Branca (Theme for a Drive Through Suburbia) and Sonic Youth (Shaking Hell and Brother James). It begins by concentrating on religious revivals and demonstrates interesting ties between religion and rock music beginning with Shakers ecstatic trance dancing. and continuing with the Ghost Dance.

== Production ==
The movie was produced by Dan Graham and the Moderna Museet. It was edited by Matt Danowski, Derek Graham, Iam Murray and Tony Oursler. Rough editing was done at Nova Scotia College of Art and Design and at Young Filmmakers in New York City. Post-production was done at Electronic Arts Intermix, at Charles Street Video in Toronto and at Number Seventeen Video Facility in New York City.

== Funding ==
- Modern Museet, Stockholm, Sweden
- NYSCA
- CAPS Grant
- Women's Interart Center

== See also ==
- List of American films of 1984
- Mudd Club
- Tier 3
- Just Another Asshole
- No wave cinema
- Post-punk
- Video essay
