= Cecelia Condit =

American video artist (born 1947)

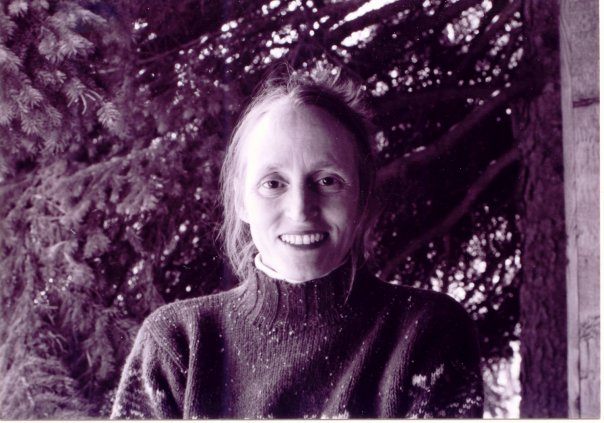
- Condit in June 2017
- Born: Cecelia Ann Condit; December 15, 1947 (age 78); Philadelphia, Pennsylvania, U.S.
- Occupations: Video Artist and Professor Emerita at the University of Wisconsin–Milwaukee
- Years active: 1981–present
- Known for: Short film, surrealist film
- Notable work: Possibly in Michigan; Beneath the Skin; Not a Jealous Bone

Cecelia Ann Condit (born December 15, 1947) is an American video artist. Condit's films are noted for their subversion of traditional mythologies of female representation and psychologies of sexuality and violence.

Condit has received awards from the Guggenheim Foundation, American Film Institute, National Endowment for the Arts, Mary L. Nohl Foundation, and Wisconsin Arts Council, and the National Media Award from the Retirement Research Foundation. Her work has been shown internationally in festivals, museums and alternative spaces and is represented in collections including the Museum of Modern Art in NYC and Centre Georges Pompidou Musée National d'Art Moderne, Paris, France. In 2008, Condit had her first solo show exhibition at the CUE Art Foundation in New York.

== Early life and education ==
Condit was born in Philadelphia on December 15, 1947. She studied at Pennsylvania Academy of the Fine Arts and the University of Pennsylvania. She earned a Bachelor of Fine Arts in sculpture from the Philadelphia College of Art, which is now part of the University of the Arts. Condit then earned a Master of Fine Arts in photography from the Tyler School of Art and Architecture at Temple University.

== Career ==
Condit served as professor and director of the graduate program in the Department of Film, Video, Animation, and New Genres at the University of Wisconsin-Milwaukee.

=== Works ===
==== Beneath The Skin ====
Beneath the Skin is her first work. A short film, it follows a woman's thoughts and musings towards a recent incident in which she discovered that her boyfriend was hiding the body of his ex-girlfriend in his closet.

It is based on a real-life incident that occurred in Condit's life when she dated Ira Einhorn, also known as the Unicorn Killer. Ira had murdered his ex-girlfriend, Holly Maddux, and hidden her corpse in his closet. Condit, who began dating Einhorn, never found Maddux's corpse due to being on medication that hindered her sense of smell.

==== Possibly in Michigan ====
Possibly in Michigan is her second work which follows two women, Janice and Sharon, shopping in a mall who are stalked by a masked cannibal named Arthur. Both of the girls later killed Arthur and eat him.

Most of the dialogue in the movie is also based on the time when she was dating Ira Einhorn. The song from the movie Animal Cannibal also gained attraction.

== Videography ==
Year	Title
1981	Beneath the Skin
1983	Possibly in Michigan
1987	Not a Jealous Bone
1996	Suburbs of Eden
1990/2008	Oh, Rapunzel
2003	Why Not a Sparrow
2004	All About a Girl
2005	Little Spirits
2008	Annie Lloyd
2015	Pulling Up Roots
2016	Some Dark Place
2017	Pizzly Bear
2019	We Were Hardly More Than Children
2020	I've Been Afraid
2021	AI and I
2024	A Parable of Now
2025	Monster in Me

Condit considers the following films to be part of the "Jill Sands trilogy", which refers to three of her films which star the actress Jill Sands; Beneath the Skin, Possibly in Michigan, and Not a Jealous Bone.

== Select Installations ==
Condit has created a number of video installations including:

- First Dream After Mother Died (2010), a three-channel video installation that was exhibited at the North Dakota Museum of Art
- Within a Stone's Throw (2012), a three-channel video installation exhibited at the Nevada Museum of Art, the Madison Museum of Contemporary Art, and the Burren College of Art in Ireland
- Tales of Future Past (2017), a two-channel video installation exhibited at the Lynden Sculpture Garden

== Personal life ==
Condit has two grown sons, Schuyler Vogel, the chaplain at Carleton College, and Lloyd Vogel, chief executive officer at Garage Grown Gear.
