= The Dead Next Door =

1989 film

- DVD cover
- Directed by: J. R. Bookwalter
- Written by: J. R. Bookwalter
- Produced by: J. R. Bookwalter
- Starring: Bruce Campbell (voice only); Pete Ferry; Bogdan Pecic; Michael Grossi; Phil Critchfield
- Cinematography: Michael Tolochko Jr.
- Edited by: J. R. Bookwalter
- Music by: J. R. Bookwalter
- Production companies: Amsco Studios; Suburban Tempe Company
- Release date: 1989
- Running time: 84 minutes
- Country: United States
- Language: English

The Dead Next Door is a 1989 zombie horror film written, produced and directed by J. R. Bookwalter.

== Plot ==
In the near future, the world falls victim to a plague of violent carnivorous undead humans, and a black-ops elite team of soldiers, nicknamed the "Zombie Squad", has been enlisted by the government as exterminators to control the growing epidemic. While on a series of routine containment missions, the soldiers stumble upon a mysterious religious cult which wishes to protect and enable the zombies, believing them to be a punishment ordained by God. Within their compound may be a cure to the virus causing the plague.

== Cast ==
- Pete Ferry as Raimi
- Bogdan Pecic as Dr. Moulsson
- Michael Grossi as Mercer
- Jolie Jackunas as Kuller
- Robert Kokai as Rev. Jones
- Floyd Ewing Jr. as Capt. Kline
- Scott Spiegel as Richards
- Michael Tolochko as Randalls
- Bruce Campbell as Raimi and Cmdr. Carpenter (voice only)

== Production ==
Sam Raimi served as executive producer on the film under the pseudonym 'The Master Cylinder' using a portion of his payment from Evil Dead II. Bruce Campbell supervised post-production sound and dubbed the voices of two characters, Raimi and Cmdr. Carpenter. The movie was produced over nearly four years, in Akron, Ohio. Although unsure of the exact figure, in an interview director J. R. Bookwalter estimated that the film cost $125,000 to produce.

The film was shot on Super-8, which is an amateur grade film generally only used for making home movies. Everyone involved worked on the film for a deferred salary. The film is notable for highly graphic gore effects.

== Critical reception ==
AllMovie wrote, "very stylish for what is essentially an epic-scale home movie [...], this remains Bookwalter's best effort", comparing the film's fast pace to that of a "live-action video game".

== Soundtrack ==
The score for the film was composed by director J. R. Bookwalter. In September 2026, Mystic Vault Records released the soundtrack on vinyl, restored from Bookwalter's original recordings..
