= 30 Days of Night (disambiguation) =

30 Days of Night is a horror comic book mini-series.

30 Days of Night may also refer to:

- Works based on the book series:
  - 30 Days of Night (film), a 2007 horror film based on the comic book
  - 30 Days of Night (novelization), the novelization of the 2007 film
  - 30 Days of Night: Blood Trails, a 2007 miniseries (prequel of the 2007 film)
  - 30 Days of Night: Dust to Dust, a 2008 miniseries (sequel of the 2007 film)
  - 30 Days of Night: Dark Days, a 2010 horror film based on the comic book (sequel of the 2007 film)
