= 30 Days of Night (franchise) =

American horror media franchise

- Official franchise logo
- Based on: An original story by Steve Niles & Ben Templesmith
- Release date: October 19, 2007
- Country: United States
- Language: American English

The 30 Days of Night franchise is a horror fiction concept created by Steve Niles and Ben Templesmith. The plot centers around an unsuspecting isolated town in Alaska, United States which is overtaken by a swarm of vampires during a thirty-day polar night period of time, showing events from the perspective of both humans and vampires.

The franchise debuted in 2002 as a graphic novel miniseries, and was later adapted to a feature film and other media.

The franchise has an overall mixed critical reception. The first movie in 2007 initially earned mixed to poor reviews, though its reception has improved over time and it is now often seen as a horror classic. In contrast, its sequel and the limited series expansions which included the involvement of franchise creator Steve Niles, had greater negative critical reviews. Financially, the franchise turned a profit for the studio at the box office.

== Origin ==
The 2002 successful American miniseries, written by Steve Niles and illustrated by Ben Templesmith, and published by IDW Publishing, resulted in the 2007 feature film and its subsequent continuations. Originally developed as film pitch, the comic book series was a critical and financial success, followed by various spin-offs and expansions. The plot centers around a small community in Alaska, that is violently hunted by vampires, during a full month of darkness.

== Films ==
Film	U.S. release date	Director	Screenwriters	Producer(s)
30 Days of Night	October 19, 2007	David Slade	Steve Niles, Stuart Beattie & Brian Nelson	Sam Raimi and Robert Tapert
30 Days of Night: Dark Days	October 5, 2010	Ben Ketai	Steve Niles & Ben Ketai	Robert Tapert

=== 30 Days of Night (2007) ===
Once a year the remote small town of Barrow, Alaska experiences a month of darkness. Though many of its citizen travel southward during this month, Sherriff Eben Oleson and his estranged wife the deputy sheriff named Estella are among those charged with monitoring the town. A seemingly routine season turns into a living nightmare as its citizens begin getting killed one by one in with violently gory evidence. As the pair begin their investigation, they find that supernatural means may be the source of the town's terror. A group of hungry vampires who with their leader Marlow have begun a feeding spree. Forced to overcome their differences and work together, Eben and Estella band together with the remaining townspeople to fight back against the monstrous creatures with hours until dawn, and create a plan to escape with their lives.

=== 30 Days of Night: Dark Days (2010) ===
Estella mourns the passing of her husband one year ago, when he sacrificed himself to save his neighbors from the vampiric massacre at Barrow, Alaska that nearly decimated the population during its annual month-long darkness. Through her grief, she travels the world attempting to convince others of the supernatural events that occurred in her town, resulting in her arrest and questioning of her sanity given the demonic nature of her story. After learning that the vampires who attacked Barrow were under the direction of their queen named Lilith, she assembles a small team to hunt down her location and end their monstrous reign of terror. Determined to exact revenge, Estella travels to the underworldly organizations of Los Angeles with a resolve to find a means of bringing back her husband.

== Television ==
Series	Season(s)	Episodes	Originally released			Showrunners	Executive producers	Status
Series	Season(s)	Episodes	First released	Last released	Network	Showrunners	Executive producers	Status
30 Days of Night: Blood Trails	1	7	September 13, 2007	October 18, 2007	Fearnet	Steve Niles & Ben Ketai	Jim Burns, Rob Sebastian, Steve Niles and Steve Hein	Ended
30 Days of Night: Dust to Dust	1	6	July 17, 2008	August 28, 2008	Fearnet	Ben Ketai & Ed Fowler	Jim Burns, Rob Sebastian, Steve Niles, Steve Hein, Jonathan Dana and Shawnee Smith	Ended

=== 30 Days of Night: Blood Trails (2007) ===
A young drug addict named George is hired by a weary vampire hunter from New Orleans, to acquire covert information. Determined to remain sober and to leave town to change his life forever, George takes one final assignment. The job quickly escalates, when vampiric monster begin pursuing him and his contacts are murdered. George fights to stay alive while maintaining his sobriety, and attempts to warn humanity of an impending "feeding" frenzy in Barrow, Alaska.

=== 30 Days of Night: Dust to Dust (2008) ===
One month after the horrific massacre in Alaska, George Fowler is ruled a convicted murderer and sentenced to prison. Though he tries to warn others about the reality of vampires, they question his sanity. In the process, a nurse at the facility named Sara and a number of security guards are ambushed by a vampire. During the attack Sara's throat is slashed, while George escapes the prison. Her brother Nick, who was previously a police officer, investigates the event believing that the escaped prisoner is responsible. When Nick confronts the escaped prisoner, the same vampire once again attacks. After Sara begins to turn into one of the monsters herself, she calls her brother for help. Together Nick and George race to find her, trying to save her from the nightmarish reality she faces.

== Main cast and characters ==
List indicators

This section includes characters who will appear or have appeared in the franchise in main roles.

- An empty grey cell indicates the character was not in the film, or that the character's official presence has not yet been confirmed.
- ^{V} indicates a voice-only role.

Character	Film		Television	
Character	30 Days of Night	30 Days of Night: Dark Days	30 Days of Night: Blood Trails	30 Days of Night: Dust to Dust
Principal cast
Sher. Eben Oleson	Josh Hartnett	Stephen Huszar		
Stella Oleson	Melissa George	Kiele Sanchez		
Jake Oleson	Mark Rendall			
Dep. William "Billy" Kitka	Manu Bennett			
Beau Brower	Mark Boone Junior			
Doug Hertz	Joel Tobeck			
Gail	Rachel Maitland-Smith			
Marlow	Danny Huston			
the Stranger	Ben Foster			
Dane		Ben Cotton		
Paul		Rhys Coiro		
Lilith the Vampire Queen		Mia Kirshner		
Agent Norris		Troy Ruptash		
George Fowler			Andrew Laurich	Andrew Laurich
Jenny			Danielle Joy Foley	
Det. Nick Maguire				Christopher Stapleton
Sara Maguire				Mimi Michaels
Supporting cast
Denise	Amber Sainsbury			
Lucy Ikos	Elizabeth Hawthorne			
Carter Davies	Nathaniel Lees			
Wilson Bulosan	Craig Hall			
Isaac Bulosan	Chic Littlewood			
John Riis	Peter Feeney			
Iris	Megan Franich			
Arven	Andrew Stehlin	Andrew Stehlin^{A}		
Zurial	John Rawls			
Seth	Jacob Tomuri			
Amber		Diora Baird		
Todd		Harold Perrineau		
Jennifer		Katie Keating		
Stacey		Katharine Isabelle		
Jane		Stacey Roy		
Sandbag		Tapas Choudhury		
Eben		Stephen Huszar		
Axel		Marco Soriano		
Gunther		John De Santis		
Eddie			Trip Hope	
Chad			Geoff Stirling Jr.	
Cal			Shawn G. Smith	
Luis			Jeremy Lee Shranko	
Pat			T.J. Zale	
Judith Ali			Marilyn Johnson	
Vampire 1			Patrick Logan Pace	
Vampire 3			Tiffany Barrett	
Jim Maguire				Al Burke
Susan Maguire				Angelique Yalda
Det. Gina Harcourt				Shawnee Smith
Tracy				Rainie Davis

== Additional crew and production details ==
Title	Crew/Detail					
Title	Composer	Cinematographer	Editor	Production companies	Distributing companies	Running time
30 Days of Night	Brian Reitzell	Jo Willems	Art Jones	Columbia Pictures; Dark Horse Entertainment; Ghost House Pictures	Sony Pictures Releasing	1 hr 54 mins
30 Days of Night: Blood Trails	Jermaine Stegall	Nelson Cragg	Art Jones	FEARnet Productions; Ghost House Pictures; Sony Pictures Television	Fearnet	3 hrs 30 mins (30 mins/episode)
30 Days of Night: Dust to Dust	Andres Boulton	Mike Williamson	Art Jones	FEARnet Originals; Ghost House Pictures; Sony Pictures Television	Fearnet	3 hrs (30 mins/episode)
30 Days of Night: Dark Days	Andres Boulton	Eric Maddison	Ben Ketai	Sony Pictures; Ghost House Pictures; Stage 6 Films; RCR Media Group	Sony Pictures Home Entertainment	1 hrs 32 mins

== Reception ==
=== Box office and financial performance ===
Film	Box office gross			Box office ranking		Video sales gross	Worldwide total gross income	Budget	Worldwide total net income	Ref.
Film	North America	Other territories	Worldwide	All time North America	All time worldwide	North America	Worldwide total gross income	Budget	Worldwide total net income	Ref.
30 Days of Night	$39,569,000	$40,707,160	$80,276,160	#2,275	#2,194	$27,907,720	$108,183,880	$30,000,000	$78,183,880	
Totals	$39,569,000	$40,707,160	$80,276,160	x̄ #1,138	x̄ #1,097	>$27,907,720	>$108,183,880	>30,000,000	≥78,183,880	

=== Critical and public response ===
Title	Rotten Tomatoes	Metacritic	CinemaScore
30 Days of Night	51% (158 reviews)	53/100 (29 reviews)	C
30 Days of Night: Dark Days	17% (6 reviews)	(4 reviews)	—N/a

== Novels ==
To coincide with the film's release, a novelization by Tim Lebbon was published by Pocket Star on September 25, 2007. Alongside the novelization, a book series published in collaboration by IDW and Pocket Star publishing was released.

The series of novels include:

- 30 Days of Night (2007) by Tim Lebbon, winner of the Scribe Award in 2008.
- 30 Days of Night: Rumors of the Undead (2006) by Steve Niles and Jeff Mariotte
- 30 Days of Night: Immortal Remains (2007) by Steve Niles and Jeff Mariotte
- 30 Days of Night: Eternal Damnation (2008) by Steve Niles and Jeff Mariotte
- 30 Days of Night: Light of Day (2009) by Jeff Mariotte
- 30 Days of Night: Fear the Dark (2010) by Tim Lebon
