= Kiele Sanchez =

American actress (born 1977)

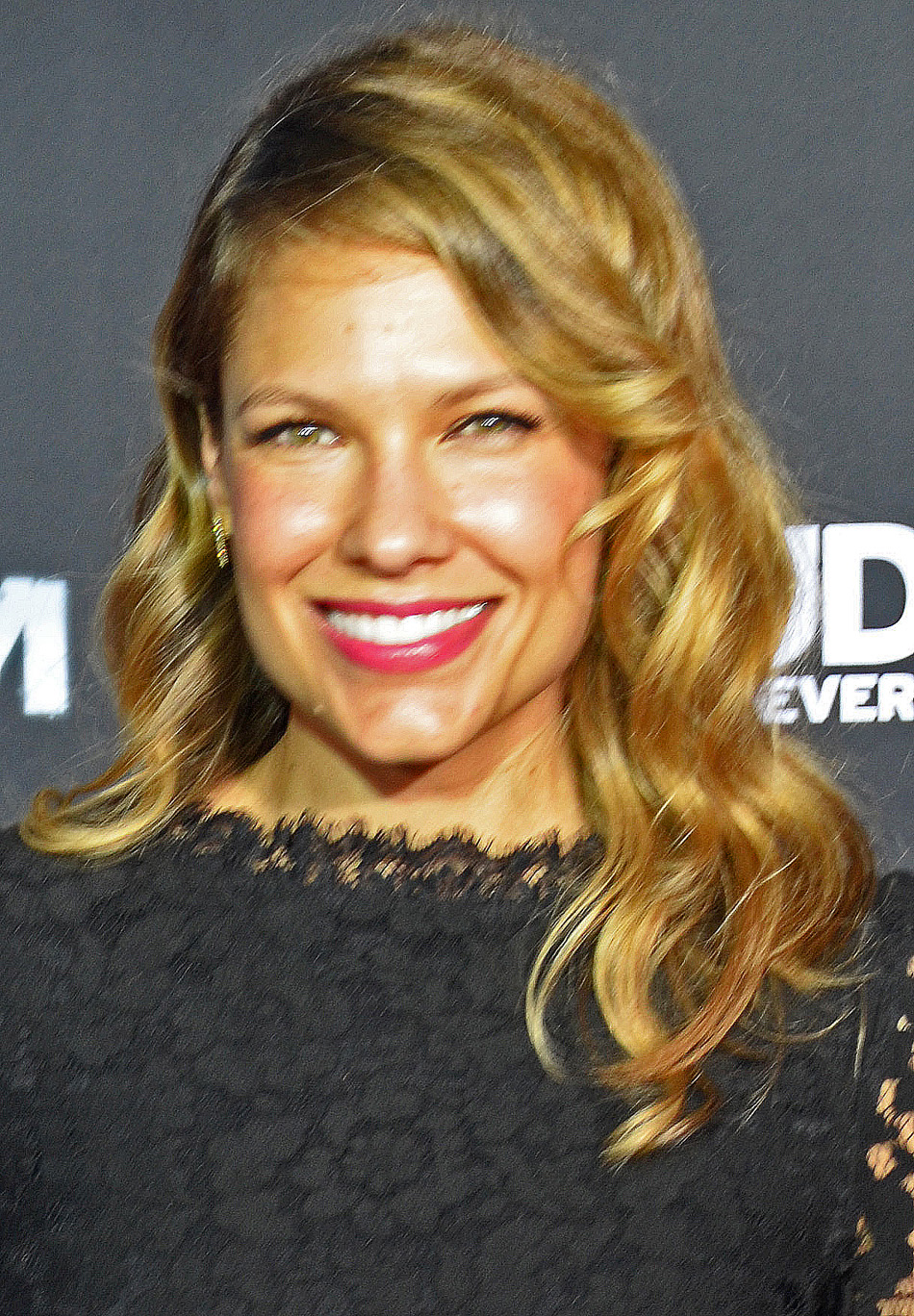
- Sanchez at the premiere of Kingdom in 2014
- Born: October 13, 1977 (age 48); Chicago, Illinois, U.S.
- Occupation: Actress
- Years active: 2000–present
- Spouses: Zach Helm (m. 2001; div. 2008); Zach Gilford (m. 2012; sep. 2025)
- Children: 2

Kiele Sanchez (/ˈkiːli/ KEE-lee; born October 13, 1977) is an American actress who starred in the A&E Network drama The Glades. Previously, she had starred as Anne Sorelli in The WB comedy-drama Related and as Nikki Fernandez on the main cast in the third season of the ABC television drama series Lost. She also starred in the DirecTV drama series Kingdom on the Audience Network.

== Early life and education ==
Sanchez was born in Chicago. Her father, Oscar Sanchez, is a racetrack jockey agent. She is one of four children, and is of Puerto Rican descent. Sanchez began her acting career at Glenbard North High School in Carol Stream, Illinois, when she performed in a school production of The Grapes of Wrath. Her performance helped her overcome her stage fright, with which she struggled at the time.

== Career ==
In 2000, Sanchez auditioned for MTV's Wanna Be a VJ contest in New York. She was selected as one of the five finalists, but did not win the competition. However, an agent who had seen her on MTV expressed interest in representing her.

After her agent recommended a move to Los Angeles, Sanchez auditioned and landed roles in the short-lived drama series That Was Then, and the sitcom Married to the Kellys. In 2003, Sanchez appeared in the film Stuck on You. She joined the cast of the hit ABC show Lost, for the series' third season, as Nikki Fernandez, but she was killed off six episodes after her first appearance. She had a recurring role on the ABC show Samantha Who?, and played a leading role in the 2008 film Insanitarium, alongside Jesse Metcalfe. She co-starred as Gina in the 2009 thriller A Perfect Getaway.

Sanchez starred in the 2010 film 30 Days of Night: Dark Days, taking over the role of Stella Oleson from Melissa George, who played her in the first film. Sanchez also starred in the DirecTV drama series Kingdom which premiered on the Audience Network in the fall of 2014. She also played a lead role in The Glades, which ran for four years.

In February 2020, she was cast as Lorna Crane, Mickey Haller's second ex-wife and office manager in the CBS series The Lincoln Lawyer, which is based on the 2005 novel of the same name by Michael Connelly. The series did not go into production at CBS and was picked up by Netflix, who announced in February 2021 that Becki Newton would replace Sanchez.

In November 2022, Sanchez joined her husband Zach Gilford in a recurring role as Sydney Voit, the wife of Gilford's character Elias Voit in Criminal Minds: Evolution.

== Personal life ==
She was married to screenwriter and director Zach Helm from 2001 to 2008.

In 2010, Sanchez began dating actor Zach Gilford, with whom she co-starred in the ABC television pilot The Matadors. The couple became engaged in November 2011, and married on December 29, 2012. The couple also co-starred in The Purge: Anarchy. In August 2015, Sanchez announced that she and Gilford were expecting their first child, a son, that November. In October 2015, the couple announced that Sanchez had suffered a late-term miscarriage. In November 2017, the couple had a daughter, born via surrogate. Their second child, a son, was born in June 2021. They filed for divorce on April 19, 2025.

== Filmography ==
=== Film ===
Year	Title	Role	Notes
2000	Migrating Forms	Dream Woman	
2001	The Kiss	Girl	Short
2001	Stealing Time	Emily	
2003	Stuck on You	Pepper Spray Cutie	
2007	Mr. Magorium's Wonder Emporium	Mrs. Goodman	
2008	Insanitarium	Lily	Video
2009	A Perfect Getaway	Gina	
2010	Redemption Road	Hannah	
2010	30 Days of Night: Dark Days	Stella Olemaun	Video
2014	The Purge: Anarchy	Liz	
2018	Benji	Whitney Hughes	

=== Television ===
Year	Title	Role	Notes
2000	Live Girls	Lynne	Television film
2001	Class Warfare	Amber Whidden	Television film
2002	That Was Then	Claudia Wills-Glass	7 episodes
2003	Young MacGyver	Taylor	Unaired TV Pilot
2003–2004	Married to the Kellys	Susan Wagner	21 episodes
2005–2006	Related	Anne Sorelli	19 episodes
2006	Four Kings	Jen	Episode: "Pilot"
2006	Modern Men	Lisa	Episode: "Pilot"
2006	Girls on the Bus	Ronnie Sarazen	Episode: "Pilot"
2006–2007	Lost	Nikki Fernandez	Main cast (season 3); 6 episodes
2007	Football Wives	Donna Reynolds	Unsold TV pilot
2007–2008	Samantha Who?	Chloe	4 episodes
2008	The End of Steve	Emily Green	Television film
2010	Matadors	Natalie Munoz	Television film
2010–2013	The Glades	Callie Cargill	49 episodes
2011	Burn Notice: The Fall of Sam Axe	Amanda Maples	Television film
2014–2017	Kingdom	Lisa Prince	40 episodes
2019	Drunk History	Emma Pulaski	Episode: "Good Samaritans"
2019	The Lost Boys	Lucy	Unsold TV pilot
2020	The Lincoln Lawyer	Lorna	Unsold TV pilot
2022–2024	Criminal Minds: Evolution	Sydney Voit	Recurring role
2023–2024	Station 19	Kate Powell	Recurring role
2023	The Fall of the House of Usher	—N/a	Co-writer: "The Raven"

== See also ==
- List of Puerto Ricans
