= Brian Nelson (screenwriter) =

American screenwriter

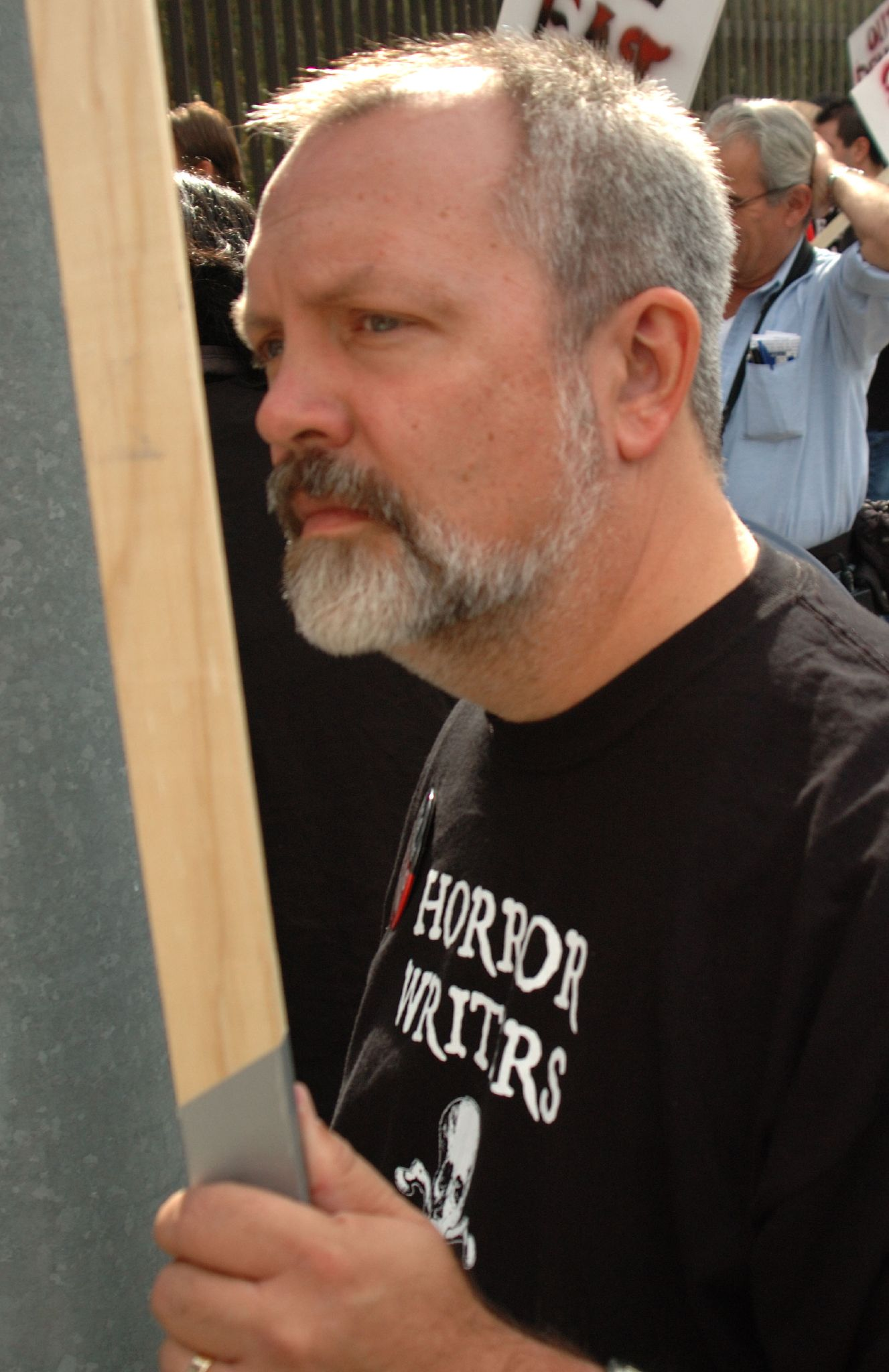
- 2007 Writers Guild of America strike
- Born: United States
- Occupation: Writer

Brian Nelson is an American screenwriter.

== Early life ==
Nelson holds degrees from Yale University and from UCLA. He worked as a drama instructor at Langley High School in McLean, Virginia in the early 1980s, where he taught Gilmore Girls actress Lauren Graham, Little Miss Sunshine screenwriter Michael Arndt, and UCLA screenwriting instructor Brian David Price.

== Writing career ==
Nelson's numerous writing credits include episodes of the television series Lois & Clark: The New Adventures of Superman, Gene Roddenberry's Earth: Final Conflict, JAG and the Disney television series' So Weird and In a Heartbeat as well as the feature film Hard Candy. He also wrote the play "Overlooked" and co-wrote the script for the vampire film 30 Days of Night, which was released in late 2007 and helmed by Hard Candy director David Slade. Nelson wrote the script for the M. Night Shyamalan-produced thriller Devil. Nelson wrote episodes 3 and 8 of the Netflix original series Altered Carbon, as well as executive-producing the show.

He was an executive producer for 2016 miniseries 11.22.63.

== Filmography ==
- Hard Candy (2005) (Also co-producer)
- 30 Days of Night (2007)
- Devil (2010)
- Rupture (2016)
- 11.22.63 (2016) (Executive producer)
