= Redemption Road =

- Directed by: Mario Van Peebles
- Written by: Morgan Simpson; George Richards
- Story by: Morgan Simpson
- Produced by: Jeff Balis; Rhoades Rader; Morgan Simpson
- Starring: Michael Clarke Duncan; Morgan Simpson; Kiele Sanchez; Taryn Manning; Luke Perry; Tom Skerritt
- Cinematography: Matthew Irving
- Edited by: Mark Conte
- Music by: Tree Adams
- Production companies: Liberty Road Entertainment; Heavy Duty Entertainment; MVP Films
- Distributed by: Freestyle Releasing
- Release dates: April 17, 2010 (NaFF); August 26, 2011 (United States)
- Running time: 95 minutes
- Country: United States
- Language: English
- Budget: $2.3 million
- Box office: $29,384

Redemption Road (also Black, White and Blues) is a 2010 American film directed by Mario Van Peebles and starring Michael Clarke Duncan and Luke Perry.

== Premise ==
In Tennessee, Bailey, a debt-straddled blues guitarist, is escorted across the state by a man named Augy so that he can collect his inheritance from his recently deceased grandfather.

== Cast ==
- Michael Clarke Duncan as Augy
- Morgan Simpson as Bailey
- Luke Perry as Boyd
- Tom Skerritt as Santa
- Taryn Manning as Jackie
- Kiele Sanchez as Hannah
- Melvin Van Peebles as Elmo
- Cassandra Lawson as Bailey’s Young Mother

== Release ==
After it played at film festivals such as the Nashville Film Festival and Hollywood Film Festival in 2010, it received a limited theatrical release in the United States on August 26, 2011.

== Reception ==
On Rotten Tomatoes it has an approval rating of 57% based on reviews from 7 critics, with an average rating of 4.5/10. On Metacritic it has a score of 44 out of 100 based on 5 reviews, indicating "mixed or average reviews".

Joe Leydon of Variety called it an "emotionally satisfying tale about a young man in need of a mentor and an older fellow in search of forgiveness." Duane Byrge of The Hollywood Reporter called it a "battling-buddy road movie [that] carries viewers on an entertaining ride into blues country." Kimberley Jones of the Austin Chronicle rated it 1 out of 5 stars and called it a mawkish melodrama sunk by Simpson's poor acting.
