= 30 Days of Night (film) =

2007 American horror film by David Slade

- Theatrical release poster
- Directed by: David Slade
- Screenplay by: Steve Niles; Stuart Beattie; Brian Nelson
- Based on: 30 Days of Night by Steve Niles; Ben Templesmith
- Produced by: Sam Raimi; Robert Tapert
- Starring: Josh Hartnett; Melissa George; Danny Huston; Ben Foster; Mark Boone Junior
- Cinematography: Jo Willems
- Edited by: Art Jones
- Music by: Brian Reitzell
- Production companies: Columbia Pictures; Ghost House Pictures; Dark Horse Entertainment
- Distributed by: Sony Pictures Releasing (North America and select international territories); Mandate International (International)
- Release date: October 19, 2007
- Running time: 114 minutes
- Country: United States
- Language: English
- Budget: $30 million
- Box office: $75.5 million

30 Days of Night is a 2007 American horror film based on the 2002 comic book miniseries of the same name by Steve Niles, who also co-wrote the film's screenplay. Directed by David Slade and starring Josh Hartnett and Melissa George, the story focuses on an Alaskan town beset by vampires as it enters into a 30-day-long polar night.

The film was released by Sony Pictures Releasing on October 19, 2007 to mixed critical reviews, and grossed $75.5 million against a budget of $30 million. Its success resulted in a franchise, including a two television miniseries, Blood Trails and Dust to Dust, and a sequel film, Dark Days.

== Plot ==
As the town of Barrow, Alaska prepares for the annual month-long polar night, a stranger arrives from a large icebreaker ship that is hidden some ways off and walks into town. Evading detection, he begins sabotaging means of communication and transportation by stealing/burning all of the satellite phones, destroying a helicopter, and killing all of the sled dogs.

Barrow's sheriff, Eben Oleson, is busy investigating the seemingly separate instances of sabotage with his deputy, Billy Kitka, when he learns that his estranged wife, Stella, is in town on her rounds as a fire marshal. She tells him that she needs a ride to catch the last plane out, or she will be forced to stay for the month. Eben has another urgent call that he must attend, but sends Billy to give Stella a ride. Billy, however, deliberately takes too long, and Stella misses her flight.

As darkness falls, things around town begin to rapidly escalate, and Eben runs into Stella when she assists him in corralling the stranger, who he finds harassing the waitress, Lucy, at the local diner. After taking him back to the police station and locking him in a holding cell, the phone lines and internet go down. Eben heads out alone to check on Gus, the technician in charge of Barrow’s telecommunications station. Unbeknownst to anyone but the stranger, a band of vampires arrives from the ship, prepared for an attack. After killing Gus and destroying the equipment, they leave his head on a spike outside the building. When Eben shows up and sees this, he rushes back to town, stopping only to tell some concerned citizens that they should return home, lock their doors, load their firearms, and wait for more information, or meet at the diner if they don't have generators.

As he returns to the police station, still unaware of what is coming, the slaughter of the townspeople commences, beginning with Ellie Riis, who is dragged out of her house through her kitchen window. Her husband, John, is injured and left for dead while trying to save her.

Eben arrives back just in time to stop the stranger from strangling his younger brother, Jake, and demands to know who killed Gus. The man, enraged by being shot, simply tells him, "You're all dead men! I don't talk to dead men!"

With no information, Eben decides to go out and search for whoever else is new in town, planning on doing a sweep with Stella and Billy. While Stella is driving, Eben spots movement and tells her to stop the truck. They both step out, and Stella uses binoculars to see something ahead in the road, frantically telling Eben to get back in the truck before trying to speed away. One of the vampires catches the vehicle and jumps on, but they escape when Eben shoots him through the roof, and he falls off. They then hear Eben's grandmother, Helen, over the radio, crying for help before the line goes dead.

When they arrive back at the police station, Jake and Helen are gone, leaving nothing but a large amount of blood and the stranger, who is still handcuffed in the cell. Eben is distraught over the thought that his brother is dead, and is almost convinced by the stranger to kill him, until Stella snaps him out of it.

At the diner, Eben and Stella find Jake, along with several other survivors who have evaded the vampires, and they decide to take shelter in a boarded-up house with a hidden attic. As the group prepares to move to the attic hideout, Eben separates from them to try and go collect weapons, and Stella joins him. Before they can accomplish anything, however, their SUV is ambushed by the band of vampires, who flip the vehicle over and drag them out. Beau Brower, the town snowplow operator, arrives, using his plow to kill some of the vampires and drive Eben and Stella to safety before joining them at the house where they were supposed to meet the others.

After a large-scale massacre in the streets, Marlow, the leader of the vampires, enters the police station holding cell, where he finds the stranger, who believes the vampires will "turn" him as a reward for his help. However, Marlow shows disapproval at how trusting and stupid humans are, and snaps his neck instead.

As time passes in the attic, things begin to get tense. With limited supplies and after seeing that the vampires are raiding nearby houses in search of survivors, the group decides that they cannot remain there indefinitely, and plan to use the next snowstorm as cover to move.

On day seven, the vampires use a survivor as bait in an attempt to lure out any others in hiding, allowing her to walk through the streets calling out for help, while vampires shadow her from the rooftops. Eben sees the trap, but goes out to save her anyway. After realizing that he's too late for her, he instead takes the opportunity to save another resident he finds hiding underneath a house, John Riis. However, Eben is horrified to see that John has been turned, and reluctantly kills him in self-defense, returning to the house in the midst of an asthma attack before telling Stella and Beau that "John Riis became one of them".

Marlow and his mate, Iris, find John's body, and Marlow, upon seeing that he had been turned, looks disquieted.

While Eben is resting and Stella is on watch, Isaac Bulosan, an elderly man with dementia, leaves the attic. Stella wakes up and tries to stop him, but he tricks her and his son, Wilson, climbing out of the bathroom window. Discovering his father is gone, Wilson frantically rushes to find him, knocking Stella down as she tries to stop him. He runs out into the open, leaving the door open. Eben is woken by the impact of Stella hitting her head and comes down to find her stunned on the floor. She tells him what happened, and they hear something approaching. A particularly vicious vampire, Arvin, enters the house and almost finds them hiding in the bathroom, but he hears Wilson yelling outside and leaves to find him. Shortly after, Stella and Eben hear Wilson's screams as he is caught and killed. Stella blames herself for Wilson's death, saying that she should have fought harder.

Sometime later, the blizzard the survivors have been waiting for hits the town, causing a whiteout. Under the cover of the storm, the group goes to the general store for supplies, but are attacked by a vampire child, whom Jake has to kill, and end up stranded there after the blizzard abruptly ends.

On day eighteen, the group decides they must try to head for the police station even though another whiteout hasn't happened. Carter, the manager of the utilidor, a power and sewage treatment station, suggests that they could make it if someone creates a diversion. Eben takes it upon himself and lures the vampires to his grandmother's house, where there are ultraviolet grow lights, and uses one to burn Iris when she tries to rush in after him. Severely burned by the light, Iris is on the ground, thrashing in pain and whimpering, which forces Marlow to mercy-kill her.

Eben, having fled the house and escaped immediate capture, radios Stella that there are too many vampires out and he can't get away cleanly. Hearing that, Beau steps up to help, taking weapons and dynamite in a back loader tractor equipped with a chain trencher and going out to kill as many vampires as possible. When he crashes into a building, Beau attempts a suicide bombing to kill the remaining vampires. However, Beau and the vampires survive the explosion, and Marlow crushes his skull as he tries to escape the flames.

Eben returns to the station alone and informs the others that Beau didn't make it, at which point Carter stands up and reveals that he was scratched at the store and is changing. He admits that his wife and kids never came up to join him because they were killed by a drunk driver, and asks Eben to kill him so he can go be with them, which Eben does. Then, seeing from a window that Billy is signaling them with a flashlight from his home across the street, Stella and Eben go to get Billy and bring him back to the station.

The trio returns to find the others have gone. They guess that they have made for the utilidor, since that still has power, and head over there. On the way, Stella splits from the group to save a young girl, Gail Robbins, who she sees wandering down the road covered in blood after her family was slaughtered. Before they can hide, however, they are spotted by a vampire who was pursuing the girl, and Eben comes out to distract the vampire so that they can get away. Billy stumbles out after him and runs off, forcing Eben to flee too.

Eben makes it to the utilidor to find the group, but not Stella or Gail. Billy arrives shortly after, and they are all attacked by the vampire Arvin, who followed him there. Billy is bitten, but manages to kill Arvin by tackling him into the industrial grinder as he attacks Eben. Eben is then forced to kill Billy when he starts to turn.

At some point, Stella manages to raise Eben on a radio, informing him that she and Gail are alive, but trapped under a wrecked truck out on the main road. Jake identifies the vehicle, as they can see it out a window. Confirming that the vampires are everywhere, Eben tells Stella to stay put and turn off her radio before they hear her.

As the month ends, and the sunrise approaches, Marlow and the vampires plan to cut the oil pipeline line running through the town and ignite everything, using fire to destroy any evidence of their existence.

Eben and the survivors in the utilidor see oil filling the streets. Realizing Stella and Gail are trapped in the fire zone and that he cannot beat the vampires in his current state, Eben injects himself with Billy's blood. Newly turned vampire Eben emerges, planning to confront Marlow in order to give Stella and Gail an opportunity to run for safety. Although losing most of the fight, Eben manages to kill Marlow, leaving the vampires without a leader and causing those remaining to flee. With the attack over, Eben and Stella, now among the town's only survivors, decide to spend the last of their time together watching the sunrise. As the light hits them, Eben's body burns to ash in Stella's arms.

== Cast ==
- Josh Hartnett as Sheriff Eben Oleson
- Melissa George as Stella Oleson
- Danny Huston as Marlow
- Ben Foster as the Stranger
- Mark Boone Junior as Beau Brower
- Mark Rendall as Jake Oleson
- Elizabeth McRae as Helen Munson
- Amber Sainsbury as Denise
- Manu Bennett as Deputy Billy Kitka
- Elizabeth Hawthorne as Lucy Ikos
- Megan Franich as Iris
- Joel Tobeck as Doug Hertz
- Nathaniel Lees as Carter Davies
- Craig Hall as Wilson Bulosan
- Chic Littlewood as Isaac Bulosan
- Peter Feeney as John Riis
- Min Windle as Ally Riis
- Andrew Stehlin as Arvin
- John Rawls as Zurial
- Jared Turner as Aaron
- Kelson Henderson as Gabe
- Pua Magasiva as Malekai Hamm
- Grant Tilly as Gus
- Rachel Maitland-Smith as Gail Robbins
- Kate Elliott as Dawn
- Jacob Tomuri as Seth
- Camille Keenan as Kirsten Toomey

== Production ==
=== Development ===
30 Days of Night author Steve Niles conceived of the story in the form of a comic, but after meeting a lack of interest in initial pitches, tried to pitch it as a film. When this did not work out, Niles shelved the idea until he showed it to IDW Publishing. IDW published the comic and Ben Templesmith provided the artwork. When Niles and his agent, Jon Levin, shopped the comic around again as a potential film adaptation, Niles found that the idea "went shockingly well", with Sam Raimi and Senator International picking up the property rights based on the original concept and Templesmith's unique mood and concepts for the vampires.

According to Raimi, the potential project was "unlike the horror films of recent years".

Following the publication of the 30 Days of Night comic book miniseries in 2002, studios, including DreamWorks, MGM, and Senator International, bid in the $1 million range for rights to a potential vampire film based on the story. Raimi expressed interest in adapting the miniseries and was negotiating a production deal with his producing partner Robert Tapert to establish a label with Senator Entertainment, of which Senator International is the sales division. In July 2002, Senator International acquired the rights for 30 Days of Night in a seven-figure deal with Raimi and Tapert attached as producers.

By October 2002, Niles was working on adapting 30 Days of Night for the big screen, keeping the film true to the miniseries, though fleshing out the characters more significantly in the adaptation process. In February 2003, Columbia Pictures partnered with Senator International to work on 30 Days of Night, which was developing under Senator International's newly established production company, Ghost House Pictures. Mike Richardson, the Dark Horse Comics publisher who supported the adaptation project from the beginning, after having turned down an offer to initially publish the project, was attached as executive producer. The following March, Richardson revealed that Steve Niles had turned in the initial draft for the 30 Days of Night screenplay. In March 2004, however, Columbia Pictures requested that Niles's initial screenplay to be rewritten in preparation for production. Sue Binder, the business manager of Ghost House Pictures, indicated that filming for 30 Days of Night was still at least a year away, as Ghost House planned to produce three films before the vampire thriller. The following May, Stuart Beattie, one of the writers for Pirates of the Caribbean: The Curse of the Black Pearl, was rewriting Niles' 30 Days of Night draft for production. Niles was pleased with Beattie's faithfully rewritten script, which was submitted to the studio in October 2004. Adi Hasak also made uncredited contributions to the script.

In September 2005, director David Slade was announced to have signed on to 30 Days of Night, which would be distributed by Columbia Pictures mainly in North America and Mandate Pictures in international territories. In March 2006, Slade revealed that screenwriter Brian Nelson, who wrote the screenplay for Slade's previous film Hard Candy, was writing a new draft of the 30 Days of Night script, replacing Beattie's draft. The director said that filming would begin in summer 2006 in Alaska and New Zealand.

=== Casting ===
In June 2006, Josh Hartnett was announced as having been cast as the husband of the married couple who serves as the town's sheriff team. Some criticized the choice because the main character (Eben Olemaun, with the last name changed to Oleson for the motion picture adaptation) was originally Inuk in the comics. Melissa George joined the 30 Days of Night cast as a sheriff and wife of Hartnett's character. Danny Huston joined the cast as the leader of the vampires.

=== Filming ===
Filming did not begin immediately, but in a September 2006 interview, executive producer Mike Richardson said that 30 Days of Night would be shot on 35 mm film, though discussion had occurred to shoot the film on Genesis. In an interview prior to filming, Slade explained that the illustrations by Ben Templesmith would be reflected in production design. Slade also considered Nelson's draft to be the most faithful to the graphic novel. He also stated his intention to make a "scary vampire film", of which he did not think many existed. "The rest of them, they fall into all kinds of traps. We're going to try to do our best... and one of the ways we have to do it is be more naturalistic than the graphic novel, because it's very over-the-top," said Slade. Also, concern was expressed that while the vampires needed to communicate, talking might lessen the effect. To counter this, a fictional vampire language, with click consonants, was constructed with the help of a professor of linguistics and the nearby University of Auckland. Slade explained, "we designed this really simple language that didn't sound like any particular accent that you would be aware of, that was based around really simple actions, eating, hunting, yes, no, really basic, because that's what vampires do."

=== Post-production ===
By February 2007, the production phase was completed, and a rough cut of the film was prepared. In April, composer Brian Reitzell was hired to score the film.

=== Music ===
Brian Reitzell composed the film's score, with Justin Meldal-Johnsen performing. A soundtrack was released by Invada Records, with an artwork by Marc Bessant in summer 2015 on vinyl.

== Novelization ==
To coincide with the film's release, a novelization by Tim Lebbon was published by Pocket Star on September 25, 2007. It is one of six novels based on the franchise.

== Release ==
=== Box office ===
30 Days of Night was released in 2,855 cinemas in the United States and Canada on October 19, 2007. In its opening weekend, the film grossed $16 million, placing first in the box office. The film grossed $39.7 million in the United States and Canada and $35.7 million overseas for a total of $75.3 million worldwide.

=== Critical reception ===
On the review aggregation site Rotten Tomatoes, the film has an approval rating of 50% based on 156 reviews, with an average rating of 5.5/10. The site's critics consensus states: "While 30 Days of Night offers a few thrills, it ultimately succumbs to erratic execution." Metacritic reports a weighted average score of 53 out of 100 based on 29 critics, indicating "mixed or average" reviews. Audiences polled by CinemaScore gave the film an average grade of "C" on an A+ to F scale.

Roger Ebert gave the film 2.5 stars out of a possible 4. He criticized several plot holes, such as the vampires moving with supernatural speed in some attacks, but ponderous slowness in others, but also singled out Danny Huston for being "quite convincing" as the vampire leader, and summed up the film as "well-made, well-photographed, and plausibly acted, and is better than it needs to be."

=== Home media ===
30 Days of Night was released February 26, 2008 on DVD, Blu-ray, and UMD for PlayStation Portable in the United States. The video sold 1,386,716 copies earning a profit of over $26,524,542.

== TV series, prequels, and sequel ==
A prequel miniseries Blood Trails was released in 2007.

A sequel miniseries Dust to Dust was released in 2008.

A straight-to-DVD sequel entitled Dark Days was released on October 5, 2010. The script for the sequel was written by Steve Niles and Ben Ketai with Ketai also positioned as director. When filming began on October 20, 2009, Rhys Coiro and Mia Kirshner were named as leads, with Kirshner playing the lead vampire villain Lilith. Other cast named included Harold Perrineau, Kiele Sanchez, Diora Baird, and Monique Ganderton. Three days after filming began, Niles revealed that Kiele Sanchez replaced Melissa George in the role of Stella Oleson. The sequel was produced on a lower budget, but being straight-to-video allowed the writers to more closely follow the comic book.

== See also ==
- Frostbite, a Swedish 2006 vampire film with a similar theme
- Vampire film
