= Josh Braaten =

American actor

- Education: Winona State University
- Occupation: Actor
- Years active: 2001–present

Josh Braaten is an American actor.

== Early life and education ==
Braaten grew up in Blooming Prairie, Minnesota, and graduated from Blooming Prairie High School in 1995. He graduated in 1999 from Winona State University, where he performed on stage in a production of Shakespeare's Macbeth, playing the title character.

== Career ==
Braaten has appeared in the TV shows CSI: Miami, This is Us, That 80's Show, Spin City, American Horror Story: Hotel, Boston Legal, Psych, The Ex List, Criminal Minds, and The Mentalist. He has also appeared in the films Dumb and Dumberer: When Harry Met Lloyd, The Frequency of Claire, and Big Shot: Confessions of a Campus Bookie. He played of the role the Flint Tropics player, Twiggy Munson in the 2008 film Semi-Pro and the role of Derek in the film Overnight. He played the role of Andy in "Katie," the second episode of the second season of New Girl. Also played the role of David in season three, episode 22: "School Recital" of Mike & Molly

Braaten is also a stage actor, performing at The Mark Taper Forum and North Coast Rep. He is a frequent contributor to "Bumper to Bumper with Dan Barreiro" on KFAN in the Twin Cities.

== Filmography ==
=== Film ===
Year	Title	Role	Notes
2003	Dumb and Dumberer: When Harry Met Lloyd	Toby	
2008	Semi-Pro	Twiggy Munson	
2012	Overnight	Derek	
2016	Love Meet Hope	Aaron	

=== Television ===
Year	Title	Role	Notes
2001	Spin City	Carson	Episode: "Minor League"
2002	Big Shot: Confessions of a Campus Bookie	Billy	Television film
2002	That '80s Show	Owen	7 episodes
2002–2005	Less than Perfect	Charlie Bobbernick	8 episodes
2003	Buffy the Vampire Slayer	Torg	Episode: "Showtime"
2003–2004	Married to the Kellys	Chris	22 episodes
2004	CSI: Miami	Brian	Episode: "Pirated"
2004	Educating Lewis	Peter Marks	Television film
2005	Life on a Stick	Brad	Episode: "Breaking Away"
2006	Boston Legal	Scott Warner	Episode: "Stick It"
2006	Modern Men	Tim Clark	7 episodes
2006	Without a Trace	Paul Duncan	Episode: "All the Sinners, Saints"
2008	Mad Men	Walt	Episode: "The Mountain King"
2008–2009	The Ex List	Marty	7 episodes
2009	The Bridget Show	Chris Hopper	Television film
2010	Psych	Scott Seaver	Episode: "A Very Juliet Episode"
2010	Criminal Minds	Colby Bachner	Episode: "Remembrance of Things Past"
2010	The Mentalist	Todd Johnson	4 episodes
2011	Game Time: Tackling the Past	Dean Walker	Television film
2011	Harry's Law	Blake Cassidy	Episode: "Purple Hearts"
2011	Criminal Behavior	Jonas Rendell	Television film
2012	Castle	Kyle Jennings	Episode: "Undead Again"
2012	New Girl	Andy	Episode: "Katie"
2013	Nikita	Jason Decker	Episode: "Survival Instincts"
2013	Mike & Molly	David	Episode: "School Recital"
2013	Horizon	Joe McNeil	Television film
2014	Perception	Derek Shelton	Episode: "Dirty"
2014	Happyland	Jack	2 episodes
2015	NCIS: Los Angeles	Adam	2 episodes
2015	American Horror Story: Hotel	Douglas Pryor	2 episodes
2016	Terry & Sherry Are Married	Aaron	Television film
2017	This Is Us	Steve Kolachek	Episode: "The 20's"
2018	Code Black	JT / Frank	Episode: "One of Our Own"
2019	Hawaii Five-0	Nate	Episode: "Kuipeia E Ka Makani Apaa"
2020	9-1-1: Lone Star	Andy	Episode: "Studs"
2021–2023	Secrets of Sulphur Springs	Ben Campbell	Main role
2022	Dahmer – Monster: The Jeffrey Dahmer Story	Young Lionel Dahmer	2 episodes
