= A Perfect Getaway =

2009 film by David Twohy

- Theatrical release poster
- Directed by: David Twohy
- Written by: David Twohy
- Produced by: Ryan Kavanaugh; Mark Canton; Tucker Tooley; Robbie Brenner
- Starring: Timothy Olyphant; Milla Jovovich; Kiele Sanchez; Steve Zahn; Marley Shelton; Chris Hemsworth
- Cinematography: Mark Plummer
- Edited by: Tracy Adams
- Music by: Boris Elkis
- Production companies: Rogue Pictures; Relativity Media; QED International
- Distributed by: Universal Pictures
- Release date: August 7, 2009
- Running time: 97 minutes
- Country: United States
- Language: English
- Budget: $14 million
- Box office: $22.9 million

A Perfect Getaway is a 2009 American thriller film written and directed by David Twohy and starring Timothy Olyphant, Milla Jovovich, Kiele Sanchez, and Steve Zahn.

Three sets of vacationing couples in Hawaii find their lives in danger when murders begin to occur on one of the islands, leading to suspicions over one of the couples being the killers.

Shot in Hawaii and Puerto Rico, A Perfect Getaway was released on August 7, 2009, in the United States. It received generally positive reviews from critics and grossed $22 million on a $14 million budget.

== Plot ==
For their honeymoon, newlyweds Cliff and Cydney travel to Hawaii. After making a travel video in the car, they spend the night in a hotel before driving off in order to start hiking towards a remote beach. The two encounter another couple: kind-hearted Cleo who attempts to hitchhike with them and hot-headed Kale who takes her away from them.

On the hike, they are befriended by tourist Nick and his girlfriend Gina. The two couples go forward on their journey together, but tensions begin to arise in the group when a double homicide of an unidentified couple is reported in Hawaii, with a man and woman being suspected as the killers. When the four arrive at a waterfall; Kale and Cleo are also there.

Kale makes vague threats to Cydney, which seemingly worries Cliff. Nick, discovering that Cliff is a screenwriter, attempts to convince him to write a script about him; he was a soldier and had his skull crushed, but survived thanks to an operation where metal plates were put in his head. Cliff lets Nick continue on about this throughout the journey, despite having no interest in making a movie about him.

After moving on, the four go deeper into the jungle and become wary of each other due to the reported murders. However, the tensions die down after they witness Kale and Cleo being arrested for the murders after some teeth were found in Kale's backpack.

Arriving at their destination, Cliff convinces Nick to explore a marine cave with him while Cydney and Gina wait behind on the beach. After Gina looks through photos in a camera, she suddenly screams at Nick and Cliff. However they ignore her, so she begins to scale a cliff after them with Cydney in pursuit.

Once alone with Cliff in the cave, Nick realizes that he has been tricked as Cliff draws a gun. It is revealed that the real Cliff and Cydney were the unidentified victims of the double homicide, murdered by their impostors. The impostor Cliff is Rocky, the high school boyfriend of the imposter of Cydney, and the two are meth addicts who have been committing the murders to assume their victims' identities - getting the victims' life stories by pretending to be scriptwriters.

Gina, who saw the wedding photos with the real Cliff and Cydney on the camera, witnesses Rocky shoot Nick and attempts to escape. She fights off Rocky's girlfriend 'Cydney', who stabs her in the leg before she is able to fling her into the sea. Before Gina can get off the cliff, Rocky climbs it and shoots. After fighting him off, she manages to run into the jungle and lower herself below. Rocky tells 'Cydney' to mislead the police about the transpiring events while he chases after Gina.

Gina finds some men but Rocky kills them all and seriously injures her before she manages to escape. Rocky's pursuit of her is stopped by the emergence of Nick, who survived the gunshot due to the previously mentioned metal plates. Nick gains the upper hand and holds Rocky at gunpoint, but a police helicopter contacted by 'Cydney' arrives on the scene, warning Nick that he will be shot if he does not release Rocky.

As Rocky tries to goad Nick into killing him, Gina gets Nick to back down. Realizing that she can stop Rocky, who is extremely abusive, and save two people who love each other, Rocky's girlfriend tells the police Rocky is the murderer, prompting them to shoot him when he tries to retrieve his gun.

Travelling back on a helicopter, Nick finally proposes to Gina. She accepts, and they mutually agree not to go on a honeymoon.

== Cast ==
- Steve Zahn as Cliff Anderson / Rocky
- Timothy Olyphant as Nick Bennett
- Milla Jovovich as Cydney Anderson
- Kiele Sanchez as Gina Stone
- Marley Shelton as Cleo
- Chris Hemsworth as Kale Garrity

Additionally, Anthony Ruivivar plays Chronic, a guide, and Dale Dickey and Peter Tuiasosopo appear as convenience store employees Earth Momma and Supply Guy. Holt McCallany and Isaac Santiago portray the police lieutenant and the police shooter, while Tory Kittles plays Sherman, one of the kayakers. The real Cliff and Cydney, referred to in the credits as "Groom" and "Bride", are portrayed by Ryan Gessell and Evelyn Lopez.

== Soundtrack ==
1. "Hey, Hey, Hey" – Tracy Adams
2. "Paradise" – RooHub
3. "Need Your Love" – Aswad
4. "Boom Chic Boom Chic" – Tracy Adams
5. "Red Dress Baby Doll" – Tracy Adams
6. "Ghetto Chronic" – Tracy Adams
7. "The Wretched" – Nine Inch Nails
8. "I'm Yours" – Jason Mraz

== Marketing ==
The film was promoted with several videos posted to YouTube. The reports, attributed to the fictional news agency Global Digital News created by Universal Pictures, detailed a string of homicides targeting honeymooning couples. They were posted to a YouTube channel designed to look like a local news station.

== Release ==
The film was released in the United States on August 7, 2009 and grossed $5,948,555 in its opening weekend. The film made £418,703 in its first week in the United Kingdom and reached number 10 at the UK box office. Worldwide, it grossed $22,852,638.

The unrated director's cut DVD and Blu-ray were released on December 29, 2009.

== Reception ==
On Rotten Tomatoes the film holds an approval rating of 62% based on 138 reviews, with an average rating 5.8/10. The site's critics consensus reads: "While smarter than the average slasher film, A Perfect Getaway eventually devolves into a standard, predictable, excessively violent thriller." Metacritic assigned the film a weighted average score of 63 out of 100, based on 22 critics, indicating "generally favorable" reviews. Audiences polled by CinemaScore gave the film an average grade of "B−" on an A+ to F scale.

The New York Times referred to the film as a "genuinely satisfying cheap thrill". More mixed reviews include the Times Online, which gave the film 3 out of 5 stars, adding that it is a "smart" thriller but is a "little too tricky for its own good". Additionally, The Guardian rated the film 60% and said that the film is a "flawed but entertaining thriller". Michael Phillips gave the film 2 1/2 stars (out of four) and stated that A Perfect Getaway "has the fortitude to venture off the beaten path of formula."

Timothy Olyphant was the first runner-up for Toronto Film Critics Association Award for Best Supporting Actor.

== See also ==
- Fear Island
