= Insanitarium =

- DVD Cover
- Directed by: Jeff Buhler
- Written by: Jeff Buhler
- Produced by: Chris Bender; Andrew Golov; Mason Novick; Larry Schapiro; J.C. Spink; Michael J. Zampino
- Starring: Jesse Metcalfe; Kiele Sanchez; Peter Stormare; Kevin Sussman; Olivia Munn; Carla Gallo; Kurt Caceres; Mark Kelly; Evan Parke; Lisa Arturo
- Cinematography: Robert Hauer
- Edited by: Janice Hampton
- Music by: Paul D'Amour
- Production company: Stage 6 Films
- Distributed by: Sony Pictures Home Entertainment
- Release date: July 15, 2008
- Running time: 89 minutes
- Country: United States
- Language: English

Insanitarium is a 2008 American direct-to-video horror-thriller film starring Jesse Metcalfe, Kiele Sanchez, Kevin Sussman, Olivia Munn, Carla Gallo and Peter Stormare. The film is directed by Jeff Buhler.

== Plot ==
Jack (Jesse Metcalfe) goes undercover as a new patient in order to save his sister, Lily (Kiele Sanchez), who has been involuntarily institutionalized for reasons unknown. The siblings soon find that a mad doctor at the asylum, Dr. Gianetti (Peter Stormare), has been testing an experimental compound, orphium, on the patients that seems to be turning them into flesh-eating zombies; Loomis (Kurt Caceres), another patient, spreads the infection. The two siblings band together with a terminally paranoid man, Dave (Kevin Sussman), and a helpful nurse, Nancy (Olivia Munn), in the hopes of finding a way out of the asylum. They are attacked by most of the prisoners and staff, who kill Nancy; while on the 4th floor, they encounter Gianetti, who gives Dave an icepick lobotomy, incapacitating him; he attempts to get Jack too, but ends up being infected by Loomis. At the end of the film, the two siblings flag down a pair of officers (Mark Kelly & Sharon Schaffer) in their police car and ask for their help, but when the officers arrive at the asylum to investigate, they accidentally let the patients escape into the outside world. It ends with a panning shot, revealing the city below the asylum's hillside location.

The secondary plot focuses on the affair between Charles (Evan Parke) and Heather (Lisa Arturo).

== Cast ==
- Jesse Metcalfe as Jack
- Kiele Sanchez as Lily
- Peter Stormare as Dr. Gianetti
- Kevin Sussman as Dave
- Olivia Munn as Nancy
- Evan Parke as Charles
- Carla Gallo as Vera Downing
- Armin Shimerman as Hawthorne
- Lisa Arturo as Heather
- Kurt Caceres as Loomis
- Molly Bryant as Nurse Henderson

== Production ==
The film was shot during August/September 2007 with the majority of filming taking place at the abandoned RFK Memorial Hospital in Hawthorne, California. The "maximum security" set and the "laundry chute" were both constructed from scratch on site in an empty wing of the hospital.

Mathew Mungle Creations, the same special effects company that supplied the notorious effects for the Jeff Buhler written Midnight Meat Train, also supplied the special effects for Insanitarium. Nearly everything was done using practical effects and prosthetics with very little contribution from CGI, including the decapitation of a fake cat.

Stormare improvised many parts of his role, including the "panties in the mouth" scene with Carla Gallo, who plays Vera, his research assistant. She comments on this scene in the behind the scenes DVD extras.
