= Kurt Caceres =

American actor

- Born: Kurt Heinzman; October 18, 1972 (age 53); Napa, California, U.S.
- Education: California State University, Sacramento
- Occupation: Actor
- Years active: 1998-present

Kurt Caceres (born Kurt Heinzman; October 18, 1972) is an American actor of German and Mexican descent. He is best known for his role as Hector Avila on the hit Fox drama Prison Break.

== Life and career ==
He was also a standout football player during his college days while attending Sacramento State University. He also stars in the video game in the Need for Speed franchise Need for Speed: Undercover as Hector Maio, a street racer/car thief.

== Filmography ==
=== Television ===
Year	Title	Role	Notes
1998	Pensacola: Wings of Gold	Corporal Brock	
1998	Profiler	Officer Platt	
1998	Silk Stalkings	Paramedic	
1999	JAG	Lt. Frank Grady	
2002	All My Children	Mateo Santos	Unknown Episodes
2003-2004	Threat Matrix	Tim Vargas	9 episodes
2004	ER	Luis Sanchez	
2004-2005	The Shield	Juan Lozano	5 episodes
2005-2006	Prison Break	Hector Avila	5 episodes
2008	Ghost Whisperer	Det. Carl Neely	5 episodes
2009	CSI: Crime Scene Investigation	Billy Ray Hatford	
2009	Lie To Me	Jack Garcia	
2009	Dollhouse	Gabriel Crestejo	
2011	General Hospital	Javier	9 episodes
2012	Sons of Anarchy	Renaldo	2 episodes
2013	Dexter	Officer martinez	2 episodes
2016	Better Call Saul	Assistant DA	
2016	The Bold and the Beautiful	Ed De La Rosa	2 episodes
2016	Days of Our Lives	Guillermo	4 episodes
2016-2018	T@gged	Officer Fricks	22 episodes

=== Films, Specials, Documentaries and Made-for-TV Movies ===
Year	Title	Role	Notes
2000	Blood Money	Raoul Restrelli	TV movie
2002	Save the Last Dance		TV movie
2008	The Last Word	Sammy	
2008	Insanitarium	Loomis	Direct-to-video
2019	Boris and the Bomb	Rafael	

=== Web ===
Year	Title	Role	Notes
2008	Takedown	Hector	4 episodes

=== Videogames ===
Year	Title	Role
2008	Need for Speed: Undercover	Hector Maio (voice)
2011	L.A. Noire	Male Pedestrian 16 (voice)
