= Devil (2010 film) =

2010 film by John Erick Dowdle

- Theatrical release poster
- Directed by: John Erick Dowdle
- Screenplay by: Brian Nelson
- Story by: M. Night Shyamalan
- Produced by: M. Night Shyamalan; Sam Mercer
- Starring: Chris Messina; Logan Marshall-Green; Geoffrey Arend; Bojana Novakovic; Jenny O'Hara; Bokeem Woodbine; Matt Craven; Jacob Vargas
- Cinematography: Tak Fujimoto
- Edited by: Elliot Greenberg
- Music by: Fernando Velázquez
- Production companies: Media Rights Capital; The Night Chronicles
- Distributed by: Universal Pictures
- Release date: September 17, 2010 (United States)
- Running time: 80 minutes
- Country: United States
- Language: English
- Budget: $10 million
- Box office: $63.4 million

Devil is a 2010 American supernatural horror film directed by John Erick Dowdle. The screenplay by Brian Nelson was derived from a story by M. Night Shyamalan. Starring Chris Messina, Logan Marshall-Green, Geoffrey Arend, Bojana Novakovic, Jenny O'Hara, Bokeem Woodbine, Matt Craven, and Jacob Vargas. The film revolves around five strangers who become trapped in an elevator, with the Devil suspected to be among them.

Devil was released on September 17, 2010, by Universal Pictures. The film received mixed reviews from critics, but grossed $63.4 million on a budget of $10 million. It is the first and only installment of The Night Chronicles, a planned trilogy of standalone horror films produced by Shyamalan.

== Plot ==
A narrator (later revealed to be Ramirez) relates a story (a fictional Mexican folklore) about his childhood, where his mother would explain to him and his siblings the circumstances that surround the Devil roaming the Earth, searching for the souls of unrepentant people to take to Hell. A man jumps to his death from a Philadelphia skyscraper, leaving a suicide note about the Devil's approaching presence.

Shortly thereafter, an elevator in the same skyscraper becomes stuck with five people inside: a temporary security guard, a mechanic/Marine veteran, a mattress salesman, a young woman, and an old woman. While the repairman, Dwight, attempts to fix the elevator, one of the security guards, Ramirez, watching through the security camera, sees a face on the monitor he believes is the Devil while the lights flicker, but his partner Lustig doubts it. When the lights return, the young woman has a bite mark on her back and the salesman has blood on his hands. Detective Bowden, who was investigating the earlier suicide and grappling with the death of his wife and son from a hit-and-run five years earlier, is called to the scene.

The lights go out again; when they return, the mattress salesman's jugular vein is impaled with a broken mirror shard, killing him and rendering the elevator a crime scene. The passengers begin to suspect each other, while the security guards monitoring through the camera talk to them one-way via the speaker, as they cannot hear the passengers. As the group argues, Dwight falls to his death on top of the elevator, terrifying the occupants. Ramirez unsuccessfully tries to convince the detectives that this could be "the Devil's Meeting". An unknown woman attempts to enter the building but is barred, and she goes around to the back.

Bowden and his partner use the sign-in sheet and elevator camera to identify the group. The temporary guard is identified as Benjamin "Ben" Larson, who has a criminal record of assault and beating someone into a coma; the mattress salesman is Vince McCormick, who lost many people their assets through a Ponzi scheme; the young woman is Sarah Caraway, who is married to a rich man and plans on leaving him after stealing his money, as she has done before; the elderly old woman is identified as Jane Kowski, who was caught on the lobby security camera stealing a woman's wallet. The mechanic cannot be identified due to him not signing in and leaving a bag in the lobby bathroom, making him the main suspect. When the lights flicker again, the older woman is seen hanging from the ceiling by her neck via a light cable.

Ben and the mechanic get in a fight, each suspecting the other as the killer. Sarah tells Ben to kill the mechanic before he kills them and Ben attacks the mechanic, but Bowden comes back to the control room and defuses the situation by having the passengers put their hands on the wall. Lustig goes into the basement to shut off the power where the firefighters are drilling into the wall. He notices a shorted wire in a puddle on the floor and attempts to move it, electrocuting himself.

After learning Sarah's husband owns the building's security company, they suspect the husband hired Ben to kill Sarah and that he killed the others to cover it up. However, the subsequent power outage ends with Ben's neck broken. The mechanic and Sarah suspect each other, arming themselves with mirror shards; the lights go out again, and Sarah's throat is slit.

The unknown woman from before is brought into the control room. She tells them that the Marine is her fiancé, and tells the detectives that his name is Anthony "Tony" Janekowski. The detectives realize he signed in after all, and that "Jane Kowski"—the elderly woman's presumed identity—was not real, as the Devil manifests in the form of the elderly woman. When Tony says he deserves to be punished, the Devil screams at him and causes the elevator to fall several floors and suddenly stop, causing the Dwight's radio to fall into the elevator cab. Tony grabs the radio and confesses to the hit-and-run that killed Bowden's family. Unable to claim Tony's soul due to his confession, the Devil vanishes and Bowden is able to get into the elevator and takes Tony into custody.

While en route, Bowden reveals to Tony that it was his family that he killed in that accident. Much to his own surprise, he forgives Tony. Ramirez concludes the film by saying that his mother would comfort him and his siblings after her scary story, telling them not to worry, because if the Devil is real, then God is real too.

== Cast ==
- Chris Messina as Detective Bowden
- Logan Marshall-Green as Anthony "Tony" Janekowski, Mechanic / Marine Veteran
- Geoffrey Arend as Vincent "Vince" McCormick, Salesman
- Bojana Novakovic as Sarah Caraway, Young Woman
- Jenny O'Hara as Jane Kowski, Old Woman / Devil
- Bokeem Woodbine as Benjamin "Ben" Larson, Guard
- Matt Craven as Lustig, Building Security
- Jacob Vargas as Ramirez, Building Security / Narrator
- Joe Cobden as Dwight, Elevator Repairman
- Caroline Dhavernas as Elsa Nahai
- Josh Peace as Detective Markowitz
- Zoie Palmer as Cheryl
- Vincent Laresca as Henry
- Craig Eldridge as Donnelly
- Rudy Webb as Old Janitor
- Genadijs Dolganovs as Janitor
- Robert Lee as Chinese Man
- Joe Pingue as Business Bureau Clerk
- Killian Gray as Uni
- Michael Rhoades as Fire Captain
- Kelly Jones as Firefighter Kurtzy
- Jay Hunter as Firefighter #1
- Lee Oliveira as Firefighter #2
- Jonathan Potts as Wayne Kazan
- Alice Poon as Officer Choi
- Stacy Chbosky as Mrs. Bowden, Car Crash Woman
- Gage Munroe as Jesse Bowden (uncredited)
- Farzad Sadrian as Man (uncredited)
- Mark Baldesarra as Coroner (uncredited)
- Shannon Garnett as The Executioner (uncredited)
- Kimberly Ables Jindra as Black Tears Woman (uncredited)
- Mark Behar as Security - Elevator (voice)

== Production ==
In October 2008 M. Night Shyamalan and Media Rights Capital announced that Devil would be made with the Dowdle brothers as directors and Brian Nelson as screenwriter.

Filming started on October 26, 2009, in Toronto with John Erick Dowdle as director and Drew Dowdle as an executive producer. There was additional shooting for the film several months later in Los Angeles and Philadelphia.

Joe Cobden had to train for four months to prepare for his role. He said that preparing for his death scene, which took four days to shoot, was the hardest scene to shoot except for the introduction and closing.

== Story sources ==
John Erick Dowdle and Drew Dowdle said that the movie is based on a Devil's Meeting, which is a premise that the Devil is on Earth to test evildoers by tormenting them. Shyamalan acknowledged that the basic structure of the story was "an Agatha Christie nod." In Christie's 1939 novel And Then There Were None, as in Devil, a group of people with guilty pasts are trapped in an isolated area and begin to die one by one.

== Release ==
The film was set to have a release date on September 17, 2010. The film's trailer debuted online on July 13, 2010.

=== Critical response ===
The film was not screened to critics in advance. On the review aggregator website Rotten Tomatoes, 49% of 98 critics' reviews are positive, with an average rating of 5.2/10. The website's consensus reads: "It's better than many of the other films M. Night Shyamalan has been associated with, but Devil never gets more than a few low-budget thrills out of its fiendishly promising premise." Metacritic, which uses a weighted average, assigned the film a score of 44 out of 100, based on 14 critics, indicating "mixed or average" reviews. Audiences polled by CinemaScore gave the film an average grade of "C+" on an A+ to F scale.

Dennis Harvey of Variety gave Devil a lukewarm review, saying "Like the solid B-thrillers of yore that often outshone A-pics topping double bills, M. Night Shyamalan-produced Devil is nothing very special or original, but it gets the job done briskly and economically."

=== Home media ===
Devil was released to DVD and Blu-ray Disc on December 21, 2010.

== Unproduced sequels ==
Devil was intended to be the first of The Night Chronicles trilogy, which involved the supernatural within modern urban society. In June 2010, Shyamalan announced the second film titled 12 Strangers, later changed to Reincarnate. The film was about a jury discussing a case dealing with the supernatural. Chris Sparling was set to write the script and Daniel Stamm would direct. Shyamalan also confirmed that the story for the currently untitled third installment was going to be taken from the abandoned sequel to Unbreakable. As of 2026, neither film has been produced, but his unused Unbreakable sequel idea later became the basis for Split.
