= Mind the Gap (novel) =

2008 novel by Bantam Dell

Mind the Gap is a novel published in June 2008 by Bantam Dell. It's a work of collaboration by authors Christopher Golden and Tim Lebbon.

== Synopsis ==
The book tells the story of Jazz, a teenage girl whose mother is murdered. Her mother's last message, written in her own blood, says "Jazz hide forever." So Jazz runs away from the mysterious Uncles who have both protected and terrified her mother. She ends up hiding in the London Underground, where she joins up with a group of runaways known as the United Kingdom. As she spends more time there, she learns that everything is connected and begins to uncover the secrets around her life and the death of her father.

== Reception ==
Publishers Weekly gave the book a positive review, stating that "occasional gaps in the story logic are easy to miss amid the super-fast pacing and creepy touches that give this teen adventure plenty of character". Johnny Butane of Dread Central praised the characterisation and the "vibrant" worldbuilding. Charles de Lint of F&SF wrote that Golden and Lebbon "do a wonderful job with this book, pulling you in with a strong opening and a likable protagonist in Jazz, and then maintaining the story with an array of mysteries and puzzles, and a cast of engaging characters."
