= Married to the Kellys =

American sitcom

- The main characters of Married to the Kellys, (from left to right) Mary, Josh, Bill, Sandy, Lewis, and Tom & Susan (in front).
- Also known as: Back to Kansas
- Genre: Sitcom
- Created by: Tom Hertz
- Starring: Breckin Meyer; Kiele Sanchez; Nancy Lenehan; Emily Rutherfurd; Joshua "Josh" Braaten; Derek Waters; Sam Anderson; Richard Riehle
- Theme music composer: Brian Adler
- Country of origin: United States
- Original language: English
- No. of seasons: 1
- No. of episodes: 22

Production
- Executive producer: Tom Hertz
- Camera setup: Multi-camera
- Running time: 22–24 minutes
- Production companies: Brad Grey Television; Game Six Productions; 20th Century Fox Television

Original release
- Network: ABC
- Release: October 3, 2003 – April 23, 2004

Married to the Kellys is an American sitcom that aired on ABC from October 3, 2003 to April 23, 2004 with a run of 22 episodes. Set in a Kansas suburb of Kansas City, Kansas, the series stars Breckin Meyer and Kiele Sanchez. The show was a part of the TGIF Friday night line up, after Hope & Faith, airing at 9:30 EST. The show earned fair enough ratings to get picked up for a whole season, but it was cancelled at the end of the season.

The series followed the adventures of a single-child New Yorker adjusting to life with his wife's large, close-knit suburban family.

The show was originally to be titled Back to Kansas.

== Premise ==
The sitcom centers on New York novelist and loner Tom (Breckin Meyer) who was raised as an only child. After he marries Susan (Kiele Sanchez), a woman raised in the Midwest by a large family, the couple moves to Kansas so they can be closer to them. Tom has to quickly adjust to life with a big, caring, and somewhat creepy family. He initially dislikes and is uncomfortable around the family, but Susan forces him to spend time with the Kellys and try to please them.

When Tom married Susan he thought he was only getting a new wife. He never even considered that he would be getting a brand-new family as well. Sandy is the mother and rule-maker of the house and Bill, the father and an only child himself, could be the person Tom can relate to the most. Mary is Susan's competitive, condescending, and envious sister who fancies herself a polymath. She has a whipped, frat-boy type husband Chris, who considers himself Bill and Sandy's favorite son-in-law, find Tom as somewhat of a threat. Susan's brother Lewis, a shy and awkward young man, has made a career of collecting bugs. He is the only family member Tom finds a real relationship with. Other family members who occasionally drop by include Uncle Dave, the big-shot banker of the family, and Lisa, the youngest daughter who wants to backpack around Europe and become an art major.

When Married to the Kellys premiered Fridays at 8:30pm/7:30 central during ABC's fall 2003 season, it aired after George Lopez, where ABC brought back its famed TGIF block along with the new Kelly Ripa comedy Hope & Faith and Life with Bonnie. Originally bought by ABC as The Untitled Tom Hertz Project the show needed a quick title in order for the series to be promoted in time for the network to unveil its new line-up. So they decided on the tentative title Back to Kansas. Although the series does take place in Kansas the title didn't quite work since the main character isn't really returning to Kansas (his wife is) and the show wasn't really about the wife's "return" to Kansas but more about the entire Kelly family and the main character's efforts in trying to fit into a new situation. The show soon acquired the more appropriate and fitting title “Married to the Kellys“.

Producer Tom Hertz loosely based this comedy on his life experiences. Not only were real-life situations used as inspiration for this sitcom, he also used real-life family members. All the characters in the series were named after Tom Hertz, his wife, and his in-laws (with the exception of Lewis).

Married to the Kellys also starred Josh Braaten, Nancy Lenehan, Emily Rutherfurd, Sam Anderson, and Derek Waters.

== Cast ==
- Breckin Meyer as Tom Wagner
- Kiele Sanchez as Susan Wagner
- Nancy Lenehan as Sandy Kelly
- Emily Rutherfurd as Mary
- Joshua "Josh" Braaten as Chris
- Derek Waters as Lewis Kelly
- Sam Anderson as Bill Kelly
- Richard Riehle as Uncle Dave

=== Guest stars ===
- Ashley Johnson as Shari
- Eddie McClintock as Bob
- Seth Green as Dr. Jim Coglan
- Stephen Tobolowsky as Henry Conway
- Tinsley Grimes as Lisa Kelly
- Lee Majors as himself
- Tony Gonzalez as himself
- Michele Lee as Maggie Wagner
- Tony Roberts as Martin Wagner
- Keith Coogan as Customer

== Characters ==
=== Tom and Susan ===
Tom is a quirky, sometimes-sardonic only child from New York who marries Kansas-raised Susan Kelly and decides to move back to her home so they can be closer to her family. Tom is a writer with a New York Times best-selling novel under his belt as well as a column in the New York Times as well as the Kansas City Times and Susan just lives off Tom's success. She works very briefly as a hostess.

=== Chris and Mary ===
Chris is the whipped and sappy son-in-law who married Mary Kelly (who kept her last name Kelly while she teaches at a university) and who fixes all of the problems around the house. Tom is usually trying to get Chris to stop being so scared and henpecked. Mary on the other hand is trying to get Chris to be like a dog to his master and ends up winning anyway.

=== Lewis ===
Lewis is Mary and Susan's younger brother. He has a strange obsession with his bugs, Skyler and Göran, and a secret girlfriend named Shari who is a colleague.

=== Bill and Sandy ===
Bill and Sandy Kelly are the average all-American parents. Bill works a normal job and Sandy stays home and takes care of the home. Sandy loves collecting coupons and has one for every occasion. The two are usually seen smiling and joking, saying words that haven't been included in the dictionary since the 1950s.

== Episodes ==
No.	Title	Directed by	Written by	Original release date	Prod. code	Viewers (millions)
1	"Pilot"	Ted Wass	Tom Hertz	October 3, 2003	1AJF79	8.04
Tom Wagner, a young, bright but somewhat lazy New York author who just tasted success with one bestselling book, gives in to his wife's homesick demands: they move to her native Kansas, close to her parents’ home. Soon the big city individualist finds his anonymous life is turned upside down as they spend more time at his in-laws' (her parents, siblings and others) and obligatory local community events then in their own home or alone, and the old-fashioned social pressure is quite alarming for a Big Apple-free spirit.
2	"Barbecue"	Mark Cendrowski	David Richardson	October 10, 2003	1AJF01	7.73
Tom hosts a barbecue in an attempt to fit in with the family but cannot assemble his new grill so he gets Susan to do it. In return Tom decides to make the dinner that the family is expecting Susan to prepare. Lewis must hide from the collection agents dispatched to recover his massive gambling debts.
3	"Lewis May Have a Girlfriend"	Philip Charles MacKenzie	Steve Holland	October 17, 2003	1AJF04	8.11
Tom meets a girl in a clothing store and decides to set her up with his socially awkward brother-in-law Lewis. The date seems to go well until Lewis reveals to Tom that he already has a girlfriend.
4	"Corrupting Chris"	Joe Regalbuto	Tom Hertz	October 24, 2003	1AJF03	7.85
Susan is sick and tired of hearing her sister Mary's husband Chris is so perfect, in fact slavishly house-trained, while her unemployed Tom is very inventive in finding ways and reasons to get out of any chores. So Tom decides to get the inconvenient 'good example' Chris to become less helpful and spend some time drinking. It works like a charm, but to Tom's horror Mary finds Chris being in the dog house makes him sexy, so he stops helping out and the Kelly parents expect him to take over.
5	"Tom Makes a Friend"	Shelley Jensen	Jason Gelles & Mike Haukom	October 31, 2003	1AJF06	6.44
Tom finds an obnoxious customer in the deli is a fellow New Yorker married into Kansas, Bob Lydecker, and even Susan is actually delighted to have another city couple to double date with - till she meets them and thus finds out Bobs local wife is actually Trish Arnold, who was in high-school with her, and tore up Mary's school presidential campaign posters, leading to a fight for which Susan was suspended, her most heroic youth-deed. Still her attempt to lay a guilt-trip on him doesn't stop Tom from accepting Bobs invitation to go to his company's VIP-box in the sports stadium, but when the incident between their wives, about which Mary confesses something at home, gets mentioned. Lewis is released from debtors' prison.
6	"Awkward Silence"	Andrew Tsao	Hayes Jackson	November 7, 2003	1AJF08	7.21
Tom learns he's not the only one wrestling with the must-status of countless traditions. Everyone pretends to like Sandy's ham balls family recipe, but even Susan would eat anything at home to get rid of the taste. As always it's worse for Chris- Mary isn't content to drag him to the annual Lithuanian folk-dance, because of her rivalry with Bonnie McClintock she's determined to erase the memory of his one step wrong last year by winning flat out. Tom worries he has nothing to talk about with dad Bill, so he's eager to fill in for Chris at Bill's office's softball team; it's a big hit- on Bill's ankle! So Tom stays home with Bill while everyone else sees Lewis have a ball as MC while Mary drives Chris crazy, but is satisfied when Bonnie slips over a dried fish. Back home Tom discovers Bill only pretended to be badly hurt so he could avoid the Lithuanian drag. Tom and Bill forge a relationship.
7	"The New Car"	Mark Cendrowski	Perry Rein & Gigi McCreery	November 14, 2003	1AJF07	6.78
Susan assures Tom he shouldn't feel manipulated by her family just because every choice he makes seems to make them jump to conclusions, e.g. after he didn't eat a whole giant T-bone, mother Kelly makes chicken “because Tom doesn't like steak”. When they decide to buy a new car, everyone has suggestions, but Susan tells Tom to make his own choice. Once they bring the car they both like home, everyone inspects it, except Lewis whose only question about any car is whether he fits in the trunk. However mother quickly jumps to an exceptionally serious conclusion: Tom bought a two-seater, so he doesn't want kids- the others and even Susan are inclined to believe her.
8	"The Apartment"	Gail Mancuso	Perry Rein & Gigi McCreery	November 21, 2003	1AJF11	6.42
When Lewis picks up Toms mail and opens some, it's obvious even to him Tom still has his New York apartment, but agrees not to tell; however when Lewis takes off to it just before Thanksgiving, the family soon finds out and get him back. Tom invites him over for a 'vacation' on his couch, but gets anxiety attacks after Susans whining about him needing psychological backup and not wanting to live in Kansas made him cancel his lease. Lewis tries to cheer him up by visiting 'awesome' Kansas spots such as the Worlds Largest Barn, but it only makes Lewis happy as he finally gets to cross the county border. However the Kelly's changing the traditional Thanksgiving to a celebration of New York's five boroughs does help Tom.
9	"Susan's Secret"	Wil Shriner	Michelle Nader	November 28, 2003	1AJF02	7.38
As each year, Mary makes Chris' official birthday presents list- and as Tom suspects, leaves out the best gifts for herself, so he ignores the list and gives a more original gift. At the party, Toms New York stories are a great success, but when he adds to the way he got his scar that Susan has a tattoo at the same spot, that proves to be one of Susan's best-kept secrets, especially shocking to her mother. The tempting idea of coming clean with the truth tricks several other Kelly's into confessions they are soon made to regret.
10	"A Kelly Carol"	Gail Mancuso	Michelle Nader	December 12, 2003	1AJF12	6.58
Christmas at the Kelly's is a communal series of traditions, so half-Jewish Tom can forget about anything of his own, even watching 'A Carol Christmas' on TV at home. The family is devoted, with a budget doubled since last year, to finally making the local top ten of Christmas-decorated homes, and since mother Sandy is down on the first Christmas after her ma's death, Mary takes charge in penal camp drill style of operation take over every single imaginable task, while Lewis concentrates on straying the stall figures in the wackiest places. When they're finally all off to mass, Tom sneaks on to 'Father Christmas's chair' to watch his movie, but finds this overloads the electricity, so even with Chris' expert help it's touchdown to repair it before the judges pass by; then he discovers Sandy's mother-daughter shopping tradition.
11	"Tom Doesn't Get It"	Philip Charles MacKenzie	Reese Bryant	January 9, 2004	1AJF05	6.84
Tom tells Susan that he is skipping dinner with her family so that he can concentrate on writing his book but she soon finds him out having beers and watching a game with the utility man instead. Tom thinks he knows the real reason Susan is upset but in reality he doesn't get it.
12	"Whose Pants Are Smarter?"	Gail Mancuso	Tasha Goldstone	January 23, 2004	1AJF10	7.44
The rivalry between Tom and Mary heats up when he shows her up at her own award presentation and is invited to be a guest speaker at her university. Mary especially seethes with jealousy when Tom is a favorite and they offer him a position there. Meanwhile, Lewis decides that it is time for a name change so he asks everyone to start calling him Lew.
13	"The Contractor"	Andrew Tsao	Hayes Jackson	January 30, 2004	1AJF09	6.96
When Tom decides to have a room fit for him to write and be himself in, Susan decides to give the job to Mike Evans, a locally very popular former class mate, once believed the most promising of his year - unfortunately he turns out to be the worst in the business, not even licensed... This episode's plot has a few more surprising twists.
14	"A Portrait of Susan"	Gail Mancuso	Jason Gelles & Mike Haukom	February 6, 2004	1AJF17	6.48
When Tom consults the young doctor Jim Coglan, he's a little worried how eagerly he's told to drop trou and gripped in his intimate region, but when the MD calls at the Kelly house, being another local acquaintance, it soon turns out he took his fiancée Trudy only as the best available copy of Susan, apparently his only love, and even dumps Trudy 'for her' on the spot - yet Tom soon discovers his intentions are even more twisted but innocent.
15	"Lewis Turns Twenty-Fun"	Mark Cendrowski	Reese Bryant	February 13, 2004	1AJF14	6.58
Susan spends too much time and (his) money at the mall for Tom's taste, so he puts it she has way too much spare time- to his surprise she decides to look for a job. For Lewis' twenty-first birthday the Kellys plan the usual kids party in the pizzeria; Mary has coined and even registered the term 'twenty-fun'. Tom convinces Chris that even Lewis must be ready for a more manly celebration at 21, so they first plan a (more frat style?) evening at a bar. Mary is green with envy when Susan lands the only job she was ever fired from: hostess; it's at Mario's restaurant, so the Kellys reserve a table for Lewis' birthday party there. Unfortunately the drinking turns out dry -thrown out of the bar as Lewis is still a few hours under age- and painful: he gets accidents sending him to the ER twice, losing each eye-brew. Finally at the restaurant, another family tradition, ma's birthday cake in the form of a bug, is against the restaurants policy not to allow any brought-along food, which tests Susan's loyalty to family or employer.
16	"Double Dating"	Jerry Zaks	Tasha Goldstone	February 20, 2004	1AJF16	6.16
When Tom finally finds an old male friend in Kansas, and they talk sports and other guy stuff in a bar all night instead of the Kelly's stuff such as food, Susan gets enough of a taste of his conversational boredom to realize he needs a friend, but in order for her not be left out they figure the only solution is to match up Bob with one of her female friends so they can go out as two couples. Mary and Chris host a fancy dress-up 'Oscar night' by the TV, but Sandy is worried when Lewis finds money in his tuxedo which he thinks someone gave him as a present at Marys wedding. On the Oscar evening Susan tries to match Bob with her school friend Julie as subtly as a hurricane, and Mary introduces Bob to Justine, a divorce-gloomy super-nag. Lewis discovers on the wedding pictures it was the priest who didn't get paid. When the couples double-date, Bob and Justine have a surprising announcement.
17	"Chris and Mary Fight"	Mark Cendrowski	Steve Holland	February 27, 2004	1AJF13	7.06
As Tom is quite happy constantly bickering with Susan like lovers only allow each other, he secretively encourages his docile brother-in-law Chris to stand his ground for once against his ever bossy wife Mary, but in that couple it soon leads to the first-ever break-up lasting over three hours, just when the Kelly parents plan a 'perfect' dinner for the first girl-friend that Lewis might even seem a wedding option for. Meanwhile Mary stays at their place, and overcomes Tom initial aversion by showing how much better she's at housework then either he or Susan even knew was possible, and waiting on him as she did with Chris. But will these role reversals keep satisfying everyone?
18	"Talk Radio"	Gail Mancuso	Hayes Jackson	March 5, 2004	1AJF18	5.36
Tom Wagner is delighted to hear he may finally write an article for a paper in his native New York, but as the Kellys find out they not only expect him to mention them, but Mary arranges -behind his back- an interview for him on a popular radio talk show; as the presenter is a frustrated would-be author envious of Tom’s success, he tricks Tom into insulting all Kansas so the whole family is shunned, just when dad hoped to become treasurer of his club. Meanwhile 'baby brother' Lewis is told by ma, being a major now he should start buying things himself, but rather tricks Susan into doing it for him (at Toms expense) by appealing to her maternal and shopping instincts.
19	"The Other Sister"	Mark Cendrowski	Liz Astrof	March 19, 2004	1AJF15	6.45
When Susan and Mary's younger sister Lisa returns home from classes in London, she is welcomed as the 'baby girl', but Tom soon finds out she has grown up and wants to accept an invitation to join friends on a sightseeing trip through Europe and study art history, not nursing nor commuting with the car her parents have ready for her. Chris warns him in-laws like them have no real vote in family affairs, but Tom tries to enlist everyone to encourage Lisa to stand up for her dream against their parents' expectations.
20	"The Plan"	Gail Mancuso	Michelle Nader	March 26, 2004	1AJF19	6.69
Tom and Susan ponder what to do with his tax refund. Lewis's sleeping is so excessive even his parents feel it's time to force him to get active by charging rent- he immediately announces to move out; when ma puts dad in the doghouse for the idea, Lewis decides to milk him big-time for accepting to stay. Chris waited a month before telling Mary her master-plan for their entire lives is down the drain because he lost his job; Mary is a raging wreck for days. Susan starts her own plan and economizing. Tom convinces Chris to admit he doesn't want to stay in computers, but what then? Tom makes Susan give up the plan in exchange for diamond earrings. Chris decides to get no job, but buy, fix up and sell houses instead- then he's offered his old job back, to Mary's delight...
21	"The Good Son-in-Law"	Gail Mancuso	Perry Rein & Gigi McCreery	April 16, 2004	1AJF20	5.72
When Toms symbol is eliminated from the dog house system for being the only repeat offender ever, he decides to ingratiate himself again. First he agrees to loan Chris $10,000 for his first house fix & re-sale project, but when Susan accepts Mary's condition not to tell the family, he needs an alternative and decides to pretend he's accepting to ghost-write sports hero Tony Gonzalez' book just to impress everyone. Chris is delighted to be the boss for once, but soon finds the family volunteers completely ignore his precise instructions. Toms plan B tumbles down as his lies get known, but so does the truth.
22	"Kansas v. Tom's Parents"	Gail Mancuso	Liz Astrof	April 23, 2004	1AJF21	5.91
At his retirement party, Tom's pa state it is about time for Tom to move back to New York now he has been offered a job and a relation's prestigious flat is about to be available, but Susan decides to convince them that is unnecessary by inviting -well, ordering- them to attend her parents' wedding anniversary which is held in 'Horace', the house Chris has bought and fixed up but is emotionally not ready to part with. As Lewis does not know how to tell his parents he wants to move in with his girlfriend, he just moves out the content of his room piece by piece. Yet Tom is not at ease with the coming of his folks, realizing they will see how much warmer the Kelly family is than theirs ever was.
