= Brian David Price =

American screenwriter

Brian Price is an American screenwriter, film & commercial director, and author of Classical Storytelling and Contemporary Screenwriting. He also teaches film and screenwriting at several institutions. He is currently the Director of the Graduate Screenwriting and Film Program at Hollins University and teaches screenwriting at UCLA and Yale University.

== Career ==
He sold his first screenplay, "The Many Lives of Bobby Ivers" to Universal Pictures (Hal Lieberman, producer) while still a student at UCLA. Price received his BA from Yale University in 1988 and his MFA in Screenwriting from the UCLA School of Theater, Film and Television in 1998.

His film "Bottomfeeders" won the Audience Award and Frank Capra Award at the DC Independent Film Festival, the Indie Spirit Award at the Planet Indie Film Festival in Toronto, and was a featured selection at the Philadelphia, Palm Beach, and Sarasota Film Festivals. His screenplay "Whale Farts" won the 10th annual Scriptapalooza Screenwriting Competition.

=== Teaching ===
He is currently the Chair of the Graduate Screenwriting and Film Program at Hollins University in Roanoke, VA. He also regularly teaches at Yale University, Johns Hopkins University, and the UCLA School of Film, Television and New Media. He developed and oversaw the MFA Screenwriting program at the Brooks Institute. His book Classical Storytelling and Contemporary Screenwriting was released by Focal Press in January 2018.
