= Monique Ganderton =

Canadian director, stunt woman and actress

- Born: August 6, 1980 (age 46); Edmonton, Alberta, Canada
- Occupations: Stunt performer; actress
- Years active: 2000–present
- Height: 1.8 m (5 ft 11 in)

Monique Ganderton (born August 6, 1980) is a Canadian stunt performer and actress who works in television and film.

Ganderton was born in Edmonton, Alberta. She started out in modeling before moving to stunt work. Standing 5 ft 11 in (1.8 m) tall, she has doubled for tall actresses like Tricia Helfer, Rachel Nichols, Leelee Sobieski, Bridget Moynahan, Daryl Hannah, Rebecca Romijn and Famke Janssen. In 2009, she was cast in the recurring role of Alia in Season 9 of Smallville. In the 2019 film Avengers: Endgame, Ganderton performed and coordinated stunts. David Fincher cast her as the dominatrix in the rifle sight of the hitman played by Michael Fassbender, in the 2023 film The Killer.

== Filmography ==
=== Stunt work on TV ===
- Masters of Horror (2002)
- Battlestar Galactica (2003–2004)
- Supernatural (2005)
- The 4400 (2007)
- Flash Gordon (2007–2008)
- Blood Ties (2007)
- Samurai Girl (2008)
- Smallville (2008)
- Stargate Universe (2009)
- Human Target (2010)
- Continuum (2013)

=== Stunt work on film ===
- The Recruit (2003)
- White Chicks (2004)
- I, Robot (2004)
- Resident Evil: Apocalypse (2004)
- Fantastic Four (2005)
- Underworld: Evolution (2006)
- Final Days of Planet Earth (2006)
- Engaged to Kill (2006)
- X-Men: The Last Stand (2006)
- A Girl Like Me: The Gwen Araujo Story (2006)
- 12 Hours to Live (2006)
- The Wicker Man (2006)
- Underfunded (2006)
- In the Name of the King: A Dungeon Siege Tale (2007)
- White Noise: The Light (2007)
- Butterfly on a Wheel (2007)
- When a Man Falls in the Forest (2007)
- 88 Minutes (2007)
- Fantastic Four: Rise of the Silver Surfer (2007)
- Alien Agent (2007)
- Postal (2007)
- Walk All Over Me (2007)
- Devil's Diary (2007)
- Battlestar Galactica: Razor (2007)
- Another Cinderella Story (2008)
- Joy Ride 2: Dead Ahead (2008)
- Watchmen (2009)
- The Imaginarium of Doctor Parnassus (2009)
- 2012 (2009)
- Tron: Legacy (2010)
- Dancing Ninja (2010)
- The Cabin in the Woods (2011)
- American Ultra (2015)
- Suicide Squad (2016)
- Atomic Blonde (2017)
- Avengers: Endgame (2019) - additionally the stunt coordinator

=== Actress on TV ===
- Hendrix (2000)
- Leap Years (2001)
- Mutant X (2001)
- 1-800-Missing (2004)
- The L Word (2005)
- The 4400 (2006)
- Blood Ties (2007)
- Fallen (2007)
- Supernatural (2007)
- Smallville (2009–2010)
- Continuum (TV series) (2012) as Yvonne Ducelle
- Sleepy Hollow (2013) as Serilda
- The Tomorrow People (2014) as Nelly
- The 100 (2014, 2020) as Aurora Blake
- Unreal (2016) as Brandi

=== Actress on film ===
- Chicago (2002)
- The Wicker Man (2006)
- The Secrets of Comfort House (2006)
- A.M.P.E.D. (2007)
- When a Man Falls in the Forest (2007)
- Numb (2007)
- Inseparable (2008)
- Another Day in Hell (2009)
- Merlin and the Book of Beasts (2009)
- The King of Fighters (2010)
- Icarus (2009)
- Bad Meat (2009)
- 30 Days of Night: Dark Days (2010)
- The Twilight Saga: Eclipse (2010)
- Unrivaled (2010)
- Hard Ride to Hell (2010)
- The Cabin in the Woods (2011)
- Hansel & Gretel: Witch Hunters (2013)
- The Package (2013)
- American Ultra (2015)
- X-Men: Apocalypse (2016)
- S.W.A.T.: Under Siege (2017)
- The Killer (2023)
