= 30 Days of Night =

Horror comic book mini-series by Steve Niles

- Cover to 30 Days of Night trade paperback (art by Ben Templesmith)

Publication information
- Publisher: IDW Publishing
- Schedule: Monthly
- Format: Mini-series
- Genre: Horror
- Publication date: August – October 2002
- No. of issues: 3

Creative team
- Created by: Steve Niles; Ben Templesmith
- Written by: Steve Niles; Matt Fraction; Dan Wickline; Kelly Sue DeConnick; Ben Templesmith
- Artist(s): Ben Templesmith; Szymon Kudranski; Brandon Hovet; Josh Medors; Kody Chamberlain; Nat Jones; Milx; Alex Sanchez; Justin Randall; Bill Sienkiewicz

Collected editions
- 30 Days of Night: ISBN 0-9719775-5-0

30 Days of Night is a three-issue vampire comic book miniseries written by Steve Niles, illustrated by Ben Templesmith, and published by American company IDW Publishing in 2002. All three parties co-own the property.

The series takes place in Barrow, Alaska, so far north that during the winter, the sun does not rise for 30 days. In the series, vampires, being vulnerable to sunlight, take advantage of the prolonged darkness to openly kill the townspeople and feed at will.

Initially an unsuccessful film pitch, the series became a breakout success story for Steve Niles, whose previous works had received relatively little attention. It was also the first full-length work by co-creator Ben Templesmith. The series has been followed by numerous sequel series, and in 2007, was adapted into a film of the same name.

== Plot summary ==
Vampires flock to Barrow, Alaska, where the sun sets for about 30 days, allowing them to feed without the burden of sleep to avoid lethal sunlight. When the vampire elder Vicente learns of this plan, he travels to Barrow to end the feeding, to preserve the secrecy of vampires. Because of the cold, the vampires' senses are weakened and a few of the town's residents are able to hide. One such resident is Sheriff Eben Olemaun, who saves the town by injecting vampire blood into his veins. He uses his enhanced strength to fight Vicente, saving the lives of the few remaining townspeople, including his wife Stella. Suffering the same weakness as all vampires, Eben allows himself to die and turns to ash when the sun rises.

== Characters ==
=== Humans ===
- Eben Olemaun
- Stella Olemaun
- Jason Clifton
- Agent Andy Gray
- Jose Alex Diaz
- Chris Johnson

=== Vampires ===
The Nosferatu were once ruled by a "Council of Elders" led by Vicente. When the council decided to make themselves known to the human race, humanity rebelled and persecuted most of their race. After a millennium, only a handful survived, led by Vicente.

In the series, vampirism is portrayed as a virus, one that can be spread through scratches, bites, and contact with vampire blood. The disease turns humans who contract it undead and gives them a mouthful of shark-like fangs and black eyes, as well as superhuman strength and speed, an aversion to sunlight, and superhumanly acute senses of sight, smell, and hearing. However, these senses can be weakened by extreme cold. Also, some vampires possess additional powers, such as teleportation, telepathy, and the ability to disguise oneself. Vampires in the series differ in many ways from their mythological counterparts: impaling them with a wooden stake will not, on its own, kill them; neither will exposing them to garlic or even fire. They are extremely resilient, capable of withstanding grenades going off on their bodies, or surviving after losing half of their faces to explosions. The only way to kill them is to behead them, or expose them to the vitamins generated in direct sunlight, which sets them on fire, and burns them to ash rapidly. Also, large amounts of ultraviolet light burns them and probably can kill them, but they can never stay dead for long; if blood hits their ashes, they will regenerate.

- Vicente
- Marlow
- Lilith
- Agent Norris
- Santana
- Dane
- Billy
- Zurial
- Thomas Ramandt
- Eben Olemaun
- Stella Olemaun

== Collected editions ==
30 Days of Night was originally published as several miniseries of 22-page comic books from IDW Publishing. These single issues are now collected in several trade paperbacks, as well as hardcover collections.

- 30 Days of Night (30 Days of Night #1-3, June 2004, ISBN 0-9719775-5-0)
  - Vampires flock to Barrow, Alaska, where the sun sets for about 30 days, allowing them to feed without the burden of sleep to avoid lethal sunlight. When the vampire elder Vicente learns of this plan, he travels to Barrow to end the feeding, in order to preserve the secrecy of vampires.
- 30 Days of Night: Dark Days (Dark Days #1-6, April 2004, ISBN 1-932382-16-X)
  - This series featured the exploits of Stella Olemaun after surviving the attack on Barrow in the original series. After publishing an account of the attack (30 Days of Night), Stella draws the attention of the Los Angeles vampire population, as well as the lover of Vicente, the head vampire from the original series.
- 30 Days of Night: 2004 Annual (Collects The Book Club, The Hand That Feeds, Agent Norris: MIA, and The Trapper January 2004)
  - The Book Club: A suburban book club's discussion of Stella Olemaun's book (also titled 30 Days of Night) arouses suspicion about a shut-in neighbor, leading to his murder.
  - The Hand That Feeds: Dane seeks a hand transplant from an eccentric doctor.
  - Agent Norris: MIA: Agent Norris's transformation from a "scout" or "bug eater" to a full-blown vampire.
  - The Trapper: The introduction of John Ikos, a Barrow resident turned vampire hunter (and a main character in later series).
- 30 Days of Night: Return to Barrow (Return to Barrow #1-6, October 2004, ISBN 1-932382-36-4)
  - Brian Kitka, the brother of a Barrow victim, becomes Barrow's new sheriff after moving there with his son to investigate his brother's demise. Kitka's skepticism about the claims of a vampire attack disappears when he discovers his deceased brother's journal, which includes a full account of the attack.
- 30 Days of Night: Bloodsucker Tales (Collects Dead Billy Dead and Juarez, or Lex Nova and the Case of the 400 Dead Mexican Girls, September 2005, ISBN 1-932382-78-X)
  - Dead Billy Dead: A young man named Billy is turned into a vampire and later kidnapped, along with his girlfriend Maggie, by a vampire-obsessed scientist. Meanwhile, Goodis, a police officer whom Maggie had called when approached by the vampiric Billy, discovers Stella Olemaun's book.
  - Juarez, or Lex Nova and the Case of the 400 Dead Mexican Girls: Lex Nova's investigation of the disappearance of hundreds of girls in Juarez, Mexico. A group of vampires called the Zero Family Circus arrives in Mexico at the same time, believing the deaths to be caused by an estranged vampire.
- 30 Days of Night: Dead Space (Dead Space #1-3, February 2006)
  - After a self-imposed hiatus following the tragic events of the last shuttle mission, NASA prepares to launch the Icarus on a simple mission to help restore the nation's confidence in the space program. But their worst fears are realized when it is discovered that something has gotten aboard the shuttle, something ferocious, something with fangs and a taste for blood.
- 30 Days of Night: Three Tales (Collects Annual #2, Dead Space, and Picking up the Pieces, July 2006, ISBN 1-933239-92-1)
  - 30 Days of Night Annual #2: "The Journal of John Ikos" - Written by Steve Niles, art by Nat Jones.
  - 30 Days of Night: Dead Space - Written by Steve Niles and Dan Wickline, art by Milx.
- 30 Days of Night: Spreading the Disease (paperback, collects Spreading the Disease #1-5, July 2007, ISBN 1-60010-085-6). Written by Dan Wickline, art by Alex Sanchez.
- 30 Days of Night: Eben and Stella (paperback, collects Eben and Stella #1-4, November 2007, ISBN 1-60010-107-0). Written by Steve Niles and Kelly Sue DeConnick, art by Justin Randall.
- 30 Days of Night: Red Snow (paperback, collects Red Snow #1-3, January 2008, ISBN 1-60010-149-6). Written and illustrated by Ben Templesmith.
- 30 Days of Night: Beyond Barrow (paperback, collects Beyond Barrow #1-3, March 2008, ISBN 1-60010-155-0). Written by Steve Niles.
- 30 Days of Night: 30 Days 'Til Death (paperback, collects 30 Days 'Til Death #1-4, June 2009, ISBN 1-60010-441-X). Written and illustrated by David Lapham.
- 30 Days of Night Deluxe Edition: Book One (October 2023, ISBN 979-8887240473)
  - Collects 30 Days of Night, Dark Days, 2004 Annual, and Return to Barrow
- 30 Days of Night Deluxe Edition: Book Two (August 2024, ISBN 979-8887241050)
  - Collects Bloodsucker Tales, Annual #2, Dead Space, Picking Up the Pieces, and Spreading the Disease
- 30 Days of Night Deluxe Edition: Book Three (May 2026, ISBN 979-8887244198)
  - Collects Eben and Stella, Red Snow, and Beyond Barrow
- 30 Days of Night Deluxe Edition: Book Four (October 2026, ISBN 979-8887244921)
  - Collects 30 Days 'Til Death, Night Again, and 30 Days Of Night (2017–2018)

== Awards ==
30 Days of Night: Return to Barrow garnered Steve Niles and Ben Templesmith's first Eisner Award nominations in 2005. These included:

- Nomination, Best Limited Series
- Nomination, Best Writer (Steve Niles)
- Nomination, Best Painter/Multimedia Artist (Ben Templesmith)

== Adaptations ==
=== Audio ===
Audible produced a full-cast audio dramatization released in 2017.

=== Films ===
A film adaptation of the original 30 Days of Night miniseries was produced by Columbia Pictures and Ghost House Pictures. The screenplay went through several versions and writers, among them Steve Niles and Stuart Beattie. The film was directed by David Slade and stars Hollywood actors Josh Hartnett and Melissa George. It was released on October 19, 2007, and was filmed at Henderson Valley Studios in Auckland, New Zealand. A sequel to the film was released in October 2010. 30 Days of Night: Dark Days was directed by Ben Ketai and stars Kiele Sanchez as Stella Oleson.

=== Novels ===
- 30 Days of Night (film novelization) by Tim Lebbon ISBN 978-1-4165-4497-5
