= Modern Men =

American television sitcom

- Genre: Sitcom
- Created by: Ross McCall; Aaron Peters; Marsh McCall
- Starring: Eric Lively; Josh Braaten; Max Greenfield; Jane Seymour
- Country of origin: United States
- Original language: English
- No. of seasons: 1
- No. of episodes: 7

Production
- Executive producers: Jerry Bruckheimer; Jonathan Littman; Marsh McCall
- Camera setup: Multi-camera
- Running time: 30 minutes
- Production companies: Jerry Bruckheimer Television; Marsh McCall Productions; Warner Bros. Television

Original release
- Network: The WB
- Release: March 17 – April 28, 2006

Modern Men is an American television sitcom that premiered March 17, 2006, on The WB. The series stars Eric Lively, Josh Braaten, and Max Greenfield as three single men and lifelong friends, who hire a life coach to help them with their love lives. Wendie Malick played the life coach in the pilot episode, but when her series Jake in Progress was renewed, the role was recast with Jane Seymour. Marla Sokoloff and George Wendt are also part of the cast.

The series was created by writers Ross McCall and Aaron Peters. It is the first situation comedy by executive producer Jerry Bruckheimer. The show was canceled due to poor ratings.

== Cast ==
- Jane Seymour as Dr. Victoria Stangel
- Josh Braaten as Timothy "Tim" Clarke
- Max Greenfield as Kyle Brewster
- Eric Lively as Douglas "Doug" Reynolds
- Marla Sokoloff as Molly Clarke
- George Wendt as Tug Clarke
- Deanna Wright as Allie

== Episodes ==
No.	Title	Directed by	Written by	Original release date	Prod. code
1	"Pilot"	James Widdoes	Ross McCall & Aaron Peters & Marsh McCall	March 17, 2006	2T7100
2	"The Breakup"	Terry Hughes	Ross McCall & Aaron Peters	March 24, 2006	2T7103
3	"Sexual Healing"	Terry Hughes	Craig Doyle	March 31, 2006	2T7104
4	"Timmy, Can You Hear Me?"	Terry Hughes	Mike Teverbaugh	April 7, 2006	2T7102
5	"Kyle Dates Up"	Terry Hughes	Bonnie Kallman	April 14, 2006	2T7105
6	"The Homewrecker"	Terry Hughes	John Mankiewicz	April 21, 2006	2T7106
7	"Give 'Til You Learn"	Terry Hughes	Miriam Trogdon	April 28, 2006	2T7101
