= Andrew Stehlin =

New Zealand actor and stuntman

- Born: New Zealand
- Occupations: Actor, stuntman
- Years active: 2001–present
- Children: 3

Andrew Stehlin is a New Zealand actor and stuntman. He started his career as a set builder and stunt performer but found a way to combine his interest in acting with his stuntwork and became a part-time actor. He received a minor cult following after playing the vicious vampire beta male Arvin in the horror film 30 Days of Night (2007). In 2019, Stehlin portrayed the X-Men mutant Ariki in Dark Phoenix (2019).

== Career ==
He started his career as a hairdresser and had appeared on Hercules: The Legendary Journeys and Xena: Warrior Princess as an extra. Stehlin was attracted to the stunt roles and opted to pursue a career as a stunt man due to having a martial arts background. He was contacted by a friend to help form a stunt team for The Lord of the Rings: The Fellowship of the Ring because the original team was ironically working on the shows that Stehlin was an extra on.

== Filmography ==
=== Stunts ===
- The Lord of the Rings: The Fellowship of the Ring
- The Lord of the Rings: The Two Towers
- King Kong
- 10,000 BC
- Underworld: Rise of the Lycans
- The Warrior's Way
- Spartacus: Blood and Sand
- Spartacus: Vengeance
- Spartacus: War of the Damned
- The Hobbit: The Battle of the Five Armies
- Ghost in the Shell (2017)
- Dark Phoenix (2019)

=== Actor ===
Television roles
| Year | Title | Role | Notes |
|---|---|---|---|
| 2009 | Power Rangers R.P.M. | Hector | 2 episodes |
| 2010 | Legend of the Seeker | Guard | 3 episodes; Uncredited in 2 episodes |
| 2010-2013 | Spartacus | Rabanus | 5 episodes; Uncredited |
| 2017 | The Shannara Chronicles | Elven Man Bounty Hunter | Episode: Druid |

Film roles
| Year | Title | Role | Notes |
|---|---|---|---|
| 2001 | Trolley Boy | Thug | Short film |
| 2001 | The Lord of the Rings: The Fellowship of the Ring | Uruk-hai | Uncredited |
| 2003 | Final Combat | Kasu | |
| 2005 | Hidden | Man | |
| 2007 | 30 Days of Night | Arvin | |
| 2008 | 10,000 BC | Mammoth Hunter | Uncredited |
| 2008 | Jinx Sister | Painter 2 | |
| 2011 | Killer Elite | Dutchy | |
| 2014 | The Dark Horse | Vagrant Heavy | |
| 2016 | Crouching Tiger, Hidden Dragon: Sword of Destiny | Black Tiger | |
| 2016 | Mechanic: Resurrection | Rio Thug #5 | |
| 2017 | Ghost in the Shell | No Pupils | |
| 2019 | Dark Phoenix | Ariki | |
