= Tim Lebbon =

British horror and dark fantasy writer (born 1969)

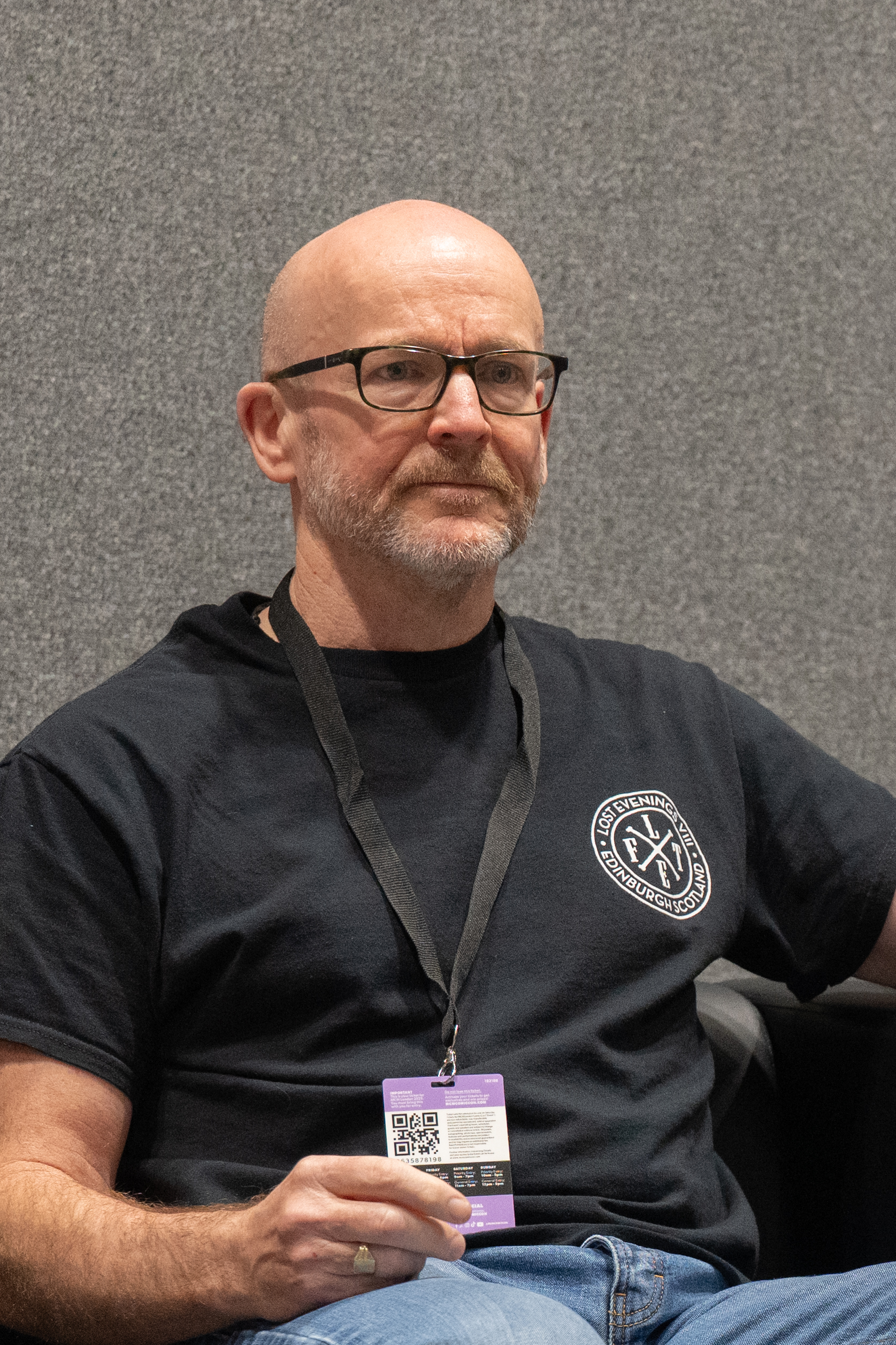
- At MCM London Comic Con, 25 October 2025
- Born: 28 July 1969 (age 57); London
- Occupation: Writer
- Writing career
- Genres: Horror fiction, Dark fantasy
- Website: www.timlebbon.net

Tim Lebbon (born 28 July 1969, London) is a British horror and dark fantasy writer.

== Life ==
Lebbon was born in London. He lived in Devon until he was eight and then in Newport until the age of 26. He now lives in Goytre, Monmouthshire with his wife and two children.

== Career ==
Lebbon's short story ″Reconstructing Amy″ won the Bram Stoker Award for Short Fiction in 2001, his novel Dusk won the 2007 British Fantasy Award for Best Novel (August Derleth Award). His novelization of the film 30 Days of Night became a New York Times bestseller and won a Scribe Award in 2008.

The film Pay the Ghost (2015) directed by Uli Edel and starring Nicolas Cage is based on Lebbon's short story of the same name. The Silence was made into a film by John R. Leonetti and was released 10 April 2019 on Netflix. Lebbon also made a cameo as a corpse in the film.

His Firefly novel Generations (fourth in series) won the 2021 Dragon Award for Best Media Tie-In Novel.

== Bibliography ==
=== Novels ===
- Mesmer (1997)
- Flesh (1999)
- The Nature of Balance (2000)
- Hush (2000, with Gavin Williams)
- Face (2001)
- Until She Sleeps (2001)
- Berserk (2005)
- Desolation (2005)
- Hellboy Novels series:
  6. Hellboy: Unnatural Selection (2006)
  12. Hellboy: The Fire Wolves (2009)
- Tales of Noreela series:
  1. Dusk (2006) – August Derleth Award winner
  2. Dawn (2007) ISBN 978-0-553-38365-2
  2.5. After the War: Two Tales of Noreela (2008), collection of 2 novellas:
  "Vale of Blood Roses", "The Bajuman"
  3. Fallen (2008) ISBN 978-0-553-38467-3
  4. The Island (2009) ISBN 978-0-553-38468-0
  - "Chanting the Violet Dog Down" (2006), short story
- 30 Days of Night series:
  - 30 Days of Night (2007)
  - 30 Days of Night: Fear of the Dark (2010)
- The Everlasting (2007)
- Bar None (2008)
- Hidden Cities series (with Christopher Golden):
  1. Mind the Gap (2008)
  2. The Map of Moments (2009) ISBN 978-0-553-38470-3
  3. The Chamber of Ten (2010)
  4. The Shadow Men (2011)
- Echo City series:
  - Echo City (2010) ISBN 978-0-553-59322-8
  - "The Deification of Dal Bamore: A Tale from Echo City" (2010), short story
- The Secret Journeys of Jack London series (with Christopher Golden):
  1. The Wild (2010)
  2. The Sea Wolves (2012)
  3. White Fangs (2013)
- The Cabin in the Woods (2011)
- Coldbrook (2012)
- The Heretic Land (2012)
- Toxic City series:
  1. London Eye (2012)
  2. Reaper's Legacy (2013)
  3. Contagion (2013)
- Canonical Alien Trilogy:
  - 1. Alien: Out of the Shadows (2013)
- Star Wars Legends series:
  - Star Wars: Dawn of the Jedi – Into the Void (2013)
- The Silence (2015)
- The Hunt (2015)
- Rage War series:
  1. Predator: Incursion (2015)
  2. Alien: Invasion (2016)
  3. Alien Vs Predator: Armageddon (2016)
- The Family Man (2016)
- Indigo (2017, with Kelley Armstrong, Christopher Golden, Charlaine Harris, Jonathan Maberry, Seanan McGuire, James A. Moore, Mark Morris, Cherie Priest, Kat Richardson)
- Kong: Skull Island (2017), novelization of film Kong: Skull Island (2017)
- Relics / Angela Gough series:
  1. Relics (2017)
  2. The Folded Land (2018)
  3. The Edge (2019)
- Blood of the Four (2018, with Christopher Golden)
- Firefly series:
  4. Generations (2020)
- Eden (2020)
- Halo series:
  1. Halo: Parasite’s Wake (2026)

=== Short stories ===
Collections:

- Faith in the Flesh (1998), collection of 2 novellas:
  "The First Law", "From Bad Flesh"
- As the Sun Goes Down (2000), collection of 15 short stories and 1 novella:
  "The Empty Room", "Life Within", "The Butterfly", "Endangered Species in C Minor", "Dust", "Fell Swoop", "Recent Wounds", "The Repulsion", "Unto Us", "The Last Good Times", "King of the Dead", "Recipe for Disaster", "The Beach", "Reconstructing Amy", "The Unfortunate" (novella), "Bomber's Moon"
- White, and Other Tales of Ruin (2002), collection of 3 short stories and 3 novellas:
  "White" (novella), "From Bad Flesh" (novella), "Hell", "The First Law" (novella), "The Origin of Truth", "Mannequin Man and the Plastic Bitch"
- Fears Unnamed (2004), collection of 4 novellas:
  "Remnants", "White", "Naming of Parts", "The Unfortunate"
- After the War: Two Tales of Noreela (2007), collection of 2 novellas of Tales of Noreela series:
  "Vale of Blood Roses", "The Bajuman"
- Last Exit for the Lost (2010), collection of 12 short stories and 7 novellas/novelettes:
  "Last Exit for the Lost", "The Cutting", "Pay the Ghost" (novelette), "Kissing at Shadows", "Hell Came Down", "Black" (novelette), "The Stuff of the Stars, Leaking", "Life Rained Off", "Skins", "The Horror of the Many Faces" (novelette), "Making Sense", "In Perpetuity" (novella), "Casting Longer Shadows", "A Ripple in the Veil", "Forever" (novelette), "Old Light", "Body", "The Evolutionary" (novelette), "Nothing Heavenly" (novella)
- Nothing as it Seems (2012), collection of 12 short stories and 3 novellas/novelettes:
  "Discovering Ghosts", "The God of Rain", "Bleeding Things", "Falling Off the World", "Making Room", "Chanting the Violet Dog Down", "Meat", "The Glass Road" (novelette), "In the Valley, Where Belladonna Grows" (novella), "The Flames Beneath the Light", "The Body Lies", "Slaughterhouse Blues", "Into The Trees", "Just Breathe", "The Reach of Children" (novella)
- Borrowed Time (2015), collection of 3 novellas of The Apocalypse trilogy:
  1. "Naming of Parts", 2. "Changing of Faces", 3. "Shifting of Veils"

Uncollected short stories:

- "Everyday Folk" (1994)
- "Floaters" (1994)
- "Slipstream: Caged" (1994)
- "The Rep" (1994)
- "Unwilling Blood" (1994)
- "Simon Says" (1994)
- "Old Treasure" (1994)
- "Grieving the Bone" (1994)
- "How Do You Eat?" (1994)
- "First Taste" (1994)
- "Breeding Ground" (1995)
- "Arm" (1996)
- "Tumblers" (1996)
- "Companions" (1996)
- "Redemption, Resurrection and the Priest" (1996)
- "The Guilty" (1996)
- "In Puris Naturalibus" (1997)
- "Sordid Limbs" (1997, with D. F. Lewis)
- "Tales of Woe" (1997)
- "Paula" (1997)
- "Bolt" (1997)
- "Wasted Meals" (1998, with D. F. Lewis)
- "Bonded in Fire" (1998)
- "Dead Echoes" (1998)
- "Mr Sneakalong" (1998)
- "Song" (1998)
- "Loved Ones" (1999)
- "Clear Thinking" (1999)
- "Spiteful Tables" (1999, with D. F. Lewis)
- "Dirty Pipes" (1999, with D. F. Lewis)
- "Pelts" (1999)
- "Detection Perfection" (1999)
- "Wordless Waffles" (1999, with D. F. Lewis)
- "Curves and Sharp Edges" (2000)
- "Going Gently" (2000)
- "Three" (2000)
- "Empty Breakfasts" (2000, with D. F. Lewis)
- "Devil Walking" (2001)
- "Inky Stories" (2001, with D. F. Lewis)
- "Cemetery Snake" (2002, with John B. Ford)
- "Fodder" (2002, with Brian Keene)
- "Exorcising Angels" (2003, with Simon Clark), novella
- "Fruiting Body Syndrome" (2003)
- "Shoes" (2004, with Brett Alexander Savory)
- Assassin series (novellas):
  1. "Dead Man's Hand" (2004)
  2. "Pieces of Hate" (2005)
  3. "A Whisper of Southern Lights" (2007)
- "Looking Glass" (2006, with Gary A. Braunbeck, Kealan Patrick Burke, Dominick Cancilla, Ray Garton, Joe Hill, Brian Keene, Thomas F. Monteleone, Robert Morrish, Thomas Piccirilli, Al Sarrantonio, John Skipp, Bev Vincent), novella
- "Children of the New Disorder" (2009, with Lindy Moore), novella
- "Every Wrong Turn" (2009)
- "The Language of the Land" (2009)
- "In the Dust" (2010)
- "The Thief of Broken Toys" (2010), novella ISBN 978-0-9812978-9-7
- "Another Hope" (2010), novella
- "Zmbs" (2010)
- "Trick of the Light" (2011)
- "Into the Death Zone" (2012)
- "Sleeper" (2012)
- "The Gleeful Ones" (2013)
- "Still Life" (2013), novella
- "Branches, Curving" (2014, with Michael Marshall Smith)
- "The Flow" (2014)
- "Embers" (2014)
- "Skin and Bone" (2015)
- "Fault Lines" (2015, with Christopher Golden), novelette
- "Strange Currents" (2015)
- "Flotsam" (2015)
- "May the End Be Good" (2015)
- "Clown's Kiss" (2015)
- "Catatonia" (2015)
- "The Protector" (2016)
- "RIME" (2016), novella
- "A Hole in the World" (2016, with Christopher Golden), novelette
- "Everybody Hates a Tourist" (2016)
- "In Stone" (2017)
- "Strings" (2017)
- "Spite" (2017)
- "Devil Dogs" (2017)
- "Spite" (2017)
- "Devil Dogs" (2017)
- Joe Ledger series:
  - "Target Acquired" (2017, with Christopher Golden)
- "Emergence" (2018)
- "A Man Walking His Dog" (2018)
- " Home" (2018)
- Firefly series:
  3. "Firefly: Generations" (2019), novella

=== Poems ===
- "A Meal Made Raw" (1998)

== Novelizations ==
- 30 Days of Night, novelization of film 30 Days of Night (2007)
- The Cabin in the Woods, novelization of film The Cabin in the Woods (2012)
- Kong: Skull Island, novelization of film Kong: Skull Island (2017)

== Adaptations ==
- Pay the Ghost (2015), film directed by Uli Edel, based on novelette "Pay the Ghost"
- The Silence (2019), film directed by John R. Leonetti, based on novel The Silence
