= Geraldine Chaplin =

American-born actress (born 1944)

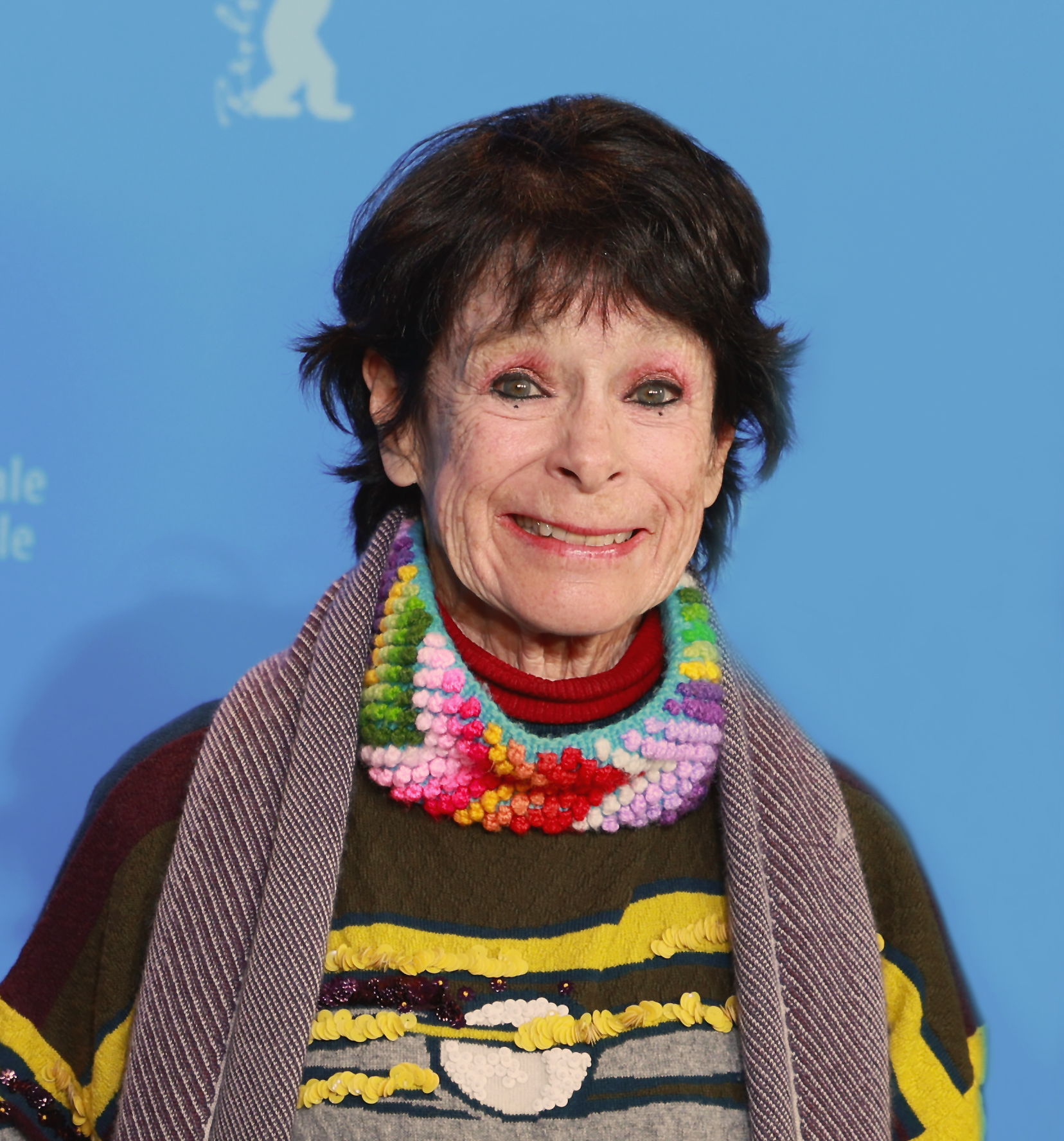
- Chaplin in 2023
- Born: Geraldine Leigh Chaplin; July 31, 1944 (age 82); Santa Monica, California, U.S.
- Citizenship: United States; United Kingdom; Spain
- Occupation: Actress
- Years active: 1952–present
- Spouse: Patricio Castilla (m. 2006)
- Partner: Carlos Saura (1967–1979)
- Children: 2, including Oona Chaplin
- Parents: Charlie Chaplin; Oona O'Neill
- Family: Chaplin family

Geraldine Leigh Chaplin (born July 31, 1944) is an actress whose extensive career has included multilingual roles in English, Spanish, French, Italian, and German films. Born in the United States and raised in the United Kingdom and Switzerland, she holds American, British, and Spanish citizenship. She is the daughter of Charlie Chaplin, the first of his eight children with his fourth wife, Oona O'Neill, and thus a granddaughter of playwright Eugene O'Neill.

After beginnings in dance and modeling, she turned her attention to acting, and made her English-language acting debut (and came to prominence in what would be a Golden Globe–nominated role) as Tonya in David Lean's Doctor Zhivago (1965). She made her Broadway acting debut in Lillian Hellman's The Little Foxes in 1967, and played ancient Egyptian Queen Nefertiti in Raúl Araiza's Nefertiti and Akhenaton (Nefertiti y Aquenatos) (1973) alongside Egyptian actor Salah Zulfikar. Chaplin received her second Golden Globe nomination for Robert Altman's Nashville (1975). She received a BAFTA nomination for her role in Welcome to L.A. (1976). She played her grandmother Hannah Chaplin in the biopic Chaplin (1992), for which she received her third Golden Globe nomination.

Chaplin has appeared in a wide variety of critically recognized Spanish and French films. She starred in The Ones and the Others (Les Uns et les Autres) (1981), Life Is a Bed of Roses (La vie est un roman) (1983) and the Jacques Rivette experimental films No King (Revenge) (Noroît (Une vengeance)) (1976) and Love on the Ground (L'Amour par terre) (1984). She was the partner of director Carlos Saura for 12 years until 1979, starring in his films Ana and the Wolves (Ana y los lobos) (1973), Raise Ravens (Cría Cuervos) (1976), Elisa, My Life (Elisa, vida mía) (1977), and Mama Turns 100 (Mamá cumple cien años) (1979). She was awarded a Goya Award for her role in In the City Without Limits (En la ciudad sin límites) (2002), and was nominated again for The Orphanage (El orfanato) (2007). Her contribution to Spanish cinema culminated in her receiving the gold medal from the Spanish Academy of Cinematographic Arts and Sciences in 2006. In 2018, she starred in Red Land (Rosso Istria), an Italian film by Maximiliano Hernando Bruno based on Norma Cossetto and the foibe massacres. In 2019, she played the Duchess of Windsor in season 3 of the Netflix period drama series The Crown.

== Early life and education ==
Geraldine Leigh Chaplin was born on July 31, 1944, in Santa Monica, California, the fourth child of actor and filmmaker Charlie Chaplin, and the first child of his fourth wife, Oona O'Neill, whom he married in 1943. Charlie Chaplin was 55 when Geraldine Chaplin was born and Oona was 19 years old. Geraldine was the first of their eight children. Her paternal grandparents were English Charles Chaplin Sr. and Hannah Chaplin (born Hannah Harriet Pedlingham Hill), and her maternal grandparents were Nobel and Pulitzer Prize-winning Irish-American playwright Eugene O'Neill and English-born writer Agnes Boulton.

When Geraldine was eight years old, her father took the family on vacation to Britain and other parts of Europe. Two days after the family set sail, the U.S. Attorney General James P. McGranery signed an order refusing Chaplin permission to re-enter the country. Chaplin's father moved the family to Switzerland. She attended boarding school there, where she became fluent in French and Spanish. Also in this time period, Geraldine appeared in her father's film Limelight (1952).

== Career ==
=== Dance and modeling ===
At 17 years of age, Chaplin decided to forgo college to pursue dance instead, and studied ballet for two years in England, including a period in 1961 at the Royal Ballet School, London. She then danced professionally for a year in Paris. Although a good dancer, she felt she had not trained from an early enough age to excel at it and so gave up ballet.

Chaplin then found work as a fashion model in Paris.

=== Early acting, 1965–1969 ===
When her dream of becoming a ballet dancer ended, Chaplin followed her father into what was to become a prolific acting career. She came to prominence in the role of Tonya in David Lean's Doctor Zhivago (1965). Lean chose her to play the main character's wife, for which she received a Golden Globe Award nomination in the category, "Most Promising Female Newcomer". In an interview to publicize the film, she explained, "Because of my name, the right doors opened."

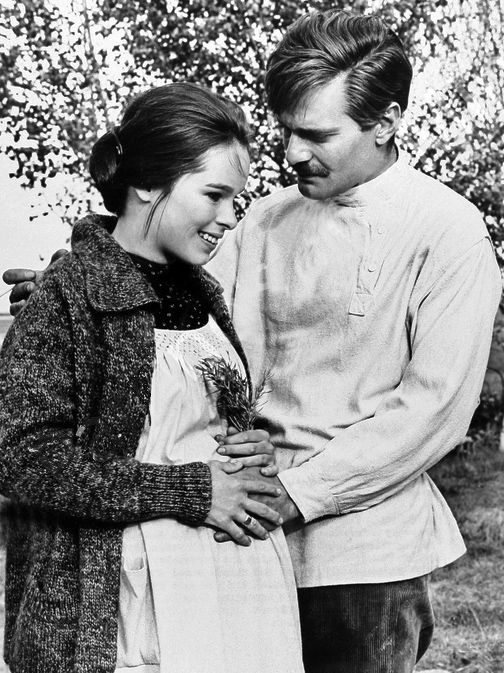
With Omar Sharif in Doctor Zhivago (1965)

In 1967, she made her Broadway debut in Lillian Hellman's The Little Foxes. Her performance was praised by Clive Barnes in a New York Times review, where he noted that Chaplin "acts with spirit and force... with a magnificently raw-voiced sincerity" giving a performance of "surprising power".

She also started what would become a major collaboration that year, starring in Spanish film director Carlos Saura's psychological thriller Peppermint Frappé (1967) and playing two women in the film, Ana and Elena.

=== The Hawaiians through Cría Cuervos, 1970–1979 ===
Chaplin starred alongside Charlton Heston in the American historical film The Hawaiians (1970). Chaplin then appeared in The Three Musketeers (1973), and Nefertiti y Aquenatos (1973), directed by Raúl Araiza in which she played the role of ancient Egyptian queen Nefertiti alongside Egyptian movie star Salah Zulfikar, as well as the sequel, The Four Musketeers (1974). Chaplin was cast as the obnoxious BBC reporter Opal in Robert Altman's Nashville (1975), for which she received her second Golden Globe nomination, for Best Supporting Actress. She went on to star in the Altman films Buffalo Bill and the Indians, or Sitting Bull's History Lesson (1976), and then A Wedding (1978), doing Roseland (1977) in between. Chaplin later occasionally co-wrote scripts for and starred in several later Saura films—for these, receiving her greatest critical success such as Ana and the Wolves (1973), Cría Cuervos (1976), Elisa, vida mía (1977), and Mamá cumple cien años (1979). Cría Cuervos won the Special Jury Prize Award at the 1976 Cannes Film Festival. Critic Vincent Canby praised Chaplin's "superb" performance.

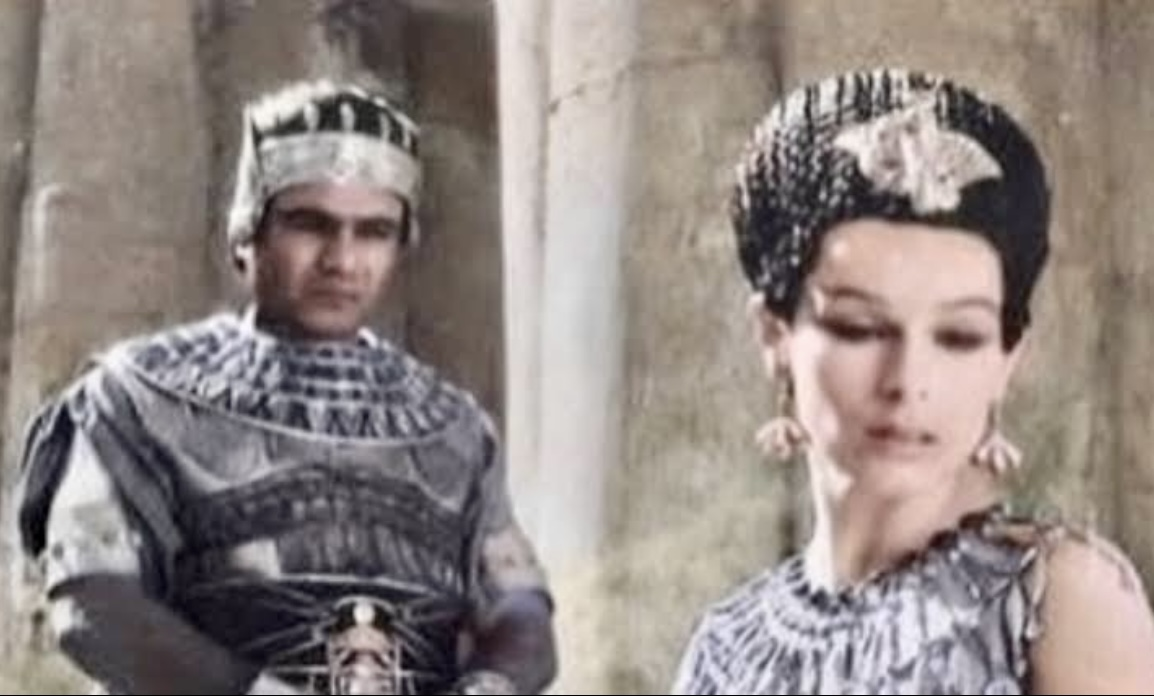
With Salah Zulfikar in Nefertiti y Aquenatos (1973)

Chaplin starred in several films produced by Altman and directed by Alan Rudolph, with a BAFTA-nominated role in Welcome to L.A. (1976), in which she played a housewife addicted to cab rides. She received critical acclaim for her role in Remember My Name (1978), in which she played Anthony Perkins' murderous estranged wife.

In an interview with The New York Times in 1977, Chaplin cited that her career was going more successfully in Europe than in the United States. She complained that "I only seem to work with Altman here ... I don't have any offers in this country, none. Not even an interesting script to read. The only person who ever asks me is Altman—and James Ivory."

=== French-language and other roles, 1980–1989 ===
In the 1980s, Chaplin starred in several French-language roles, including Claude Lelouch's Les Uns et les Autres (1981), Alain Resnais' Life Is a Bed of Roses (1983), Jacques Rivette's experimental Love on the Ground (1984), and then the American film, I Want to Go Home (1989).

Chaplin also starred in Rudolph's 1920s-set film, The Moderns (1988).

=== Chaplin, Scorsese, and Zeffirelli, 1990–1999 ===
In the biographical film about her father, Chaplin (1992), she played her grandmother Hannah Chaplin, for which she was nominated for her third Golden Globe Award. Soon after, she was directed by Martin Scorsese in The Age of Innocence (1993), and appeared in Franco Zeffirelli's version of Jane Eyre (1996).

Chaplin went on to appear in Mother Teresa: In the Name of God's Poor (1997).

=== The Spanish period, 2000–present ===
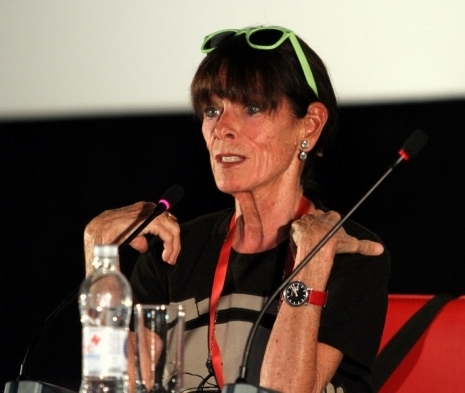
Geraldine Chaplin at the Odesa International Film Festival 2012

Chaplin received a Goya Mejor Actriz de Reparto for her role in Spanish-Argentine thriller En la ciudad sin límites (In the City Without Limits, 2002). Other notable Spanish films she collaborated with and appeared in Pedro Almodóvar's Talk to Her (2002), and Juan Antonio Bayona's The Orphanage (2007), for which she received a second Goya Award nomination. She also starred in the Catalan drama, The Mosquito Net (2010), for which she was awarded the Crystal Globe.

In 2006 Chaplin was awarded the gold medal by the Academia de las Artes y las Ciencias Cinematográficas de España—the Spanish Academy of Cinematographic Arts and Sciences—for her contribution to Spanish cinema.

Chaplin appeared in The Wolfman, in 2010.

In Americano, she appeared with Salma Hayek, and featured with Jane Fonda in All Together (both 2011). She reunited with Juan Antonio Bayona for the films The Impossible (2012), A Monster Calls (2016), and Jurassic World: Fallen Kingdom (2018). Chaplin received the Best Actress Award at the Havana Film Festival for her role in the Dominican Republic film Sand Dollars (2014).

In 2018, she starred in Red Land (Rosso Istria), an Italian movie by Maximiliano Hernando Bruno based on Norma Cossetto and the foibe massacres.

In 2022, she appeared in the music video for the song "Pure", by Swiss artist Gjon's Tears.

== Personal life ==
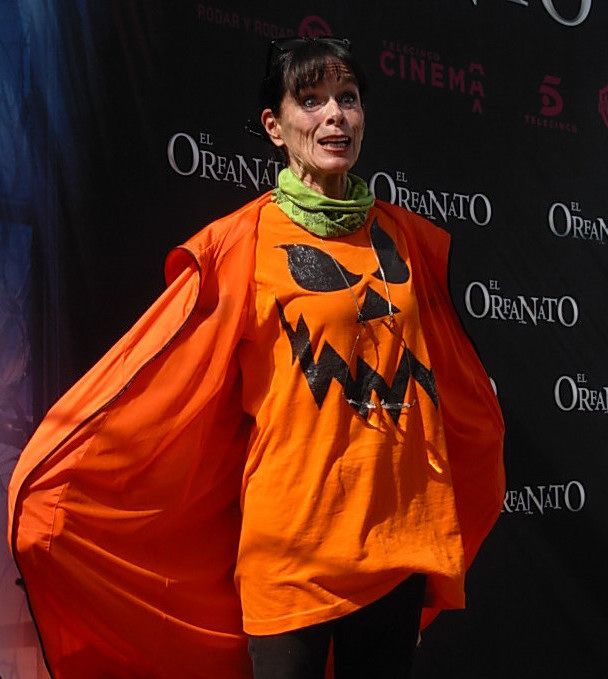
Chaplin at a screening of The Orphanage in Madrid in 2007

Chaplin has two children, Shane and Oona. Her son Shane Saura Chaplin was born in 1974. His father is Spanish film director Carlos Saura, who directed several films Chaplin appeared in. Her daughter Oona is now an actress in British and Spanish films. Chaplin married Oona's father, Chilean cinematographer Patricio Castilla, in 2006.

In 1978, the Chaplin family were the victims of a failed extortion plot by kidnappers who had stolen the body of Charlie Chaplin. Geraldine Chaplin negotiated with the kidnappers, who had also threatened her infant son.

As of 2011, Chaplin has maintained a home in Miami. She also was spending time in residences between Madrid and Corsier-sur-Vevey, Switzerland (the latter near the former long-time home of her parents).

== Filmography ==
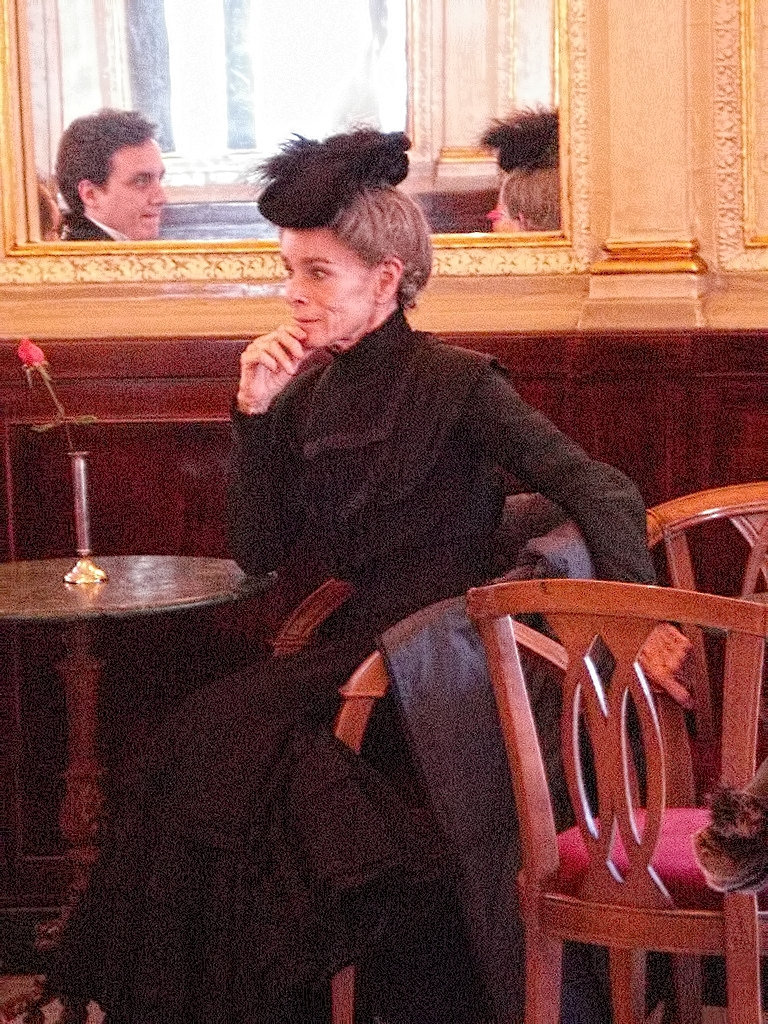
Chaplin in a break on the set at the Caffè Gambrinus in Naples, Italy

=== Film ===
Year	Film	Role	Director	Notes
1952	Limelight	Little Girl in Opening Scene	Charles Chaplin	Uncredited
1965	Crime on a Summer Morning	Zelda	Jacques Deray	
1965	Doctor Zhivago	Tonya Gromeko	David Lean	Nominated – Golden Globe Award Most Promising Newcomer
1966	Andremo in città	Lenka	Nelo Risi	
1967	Casino Royale	Keystone Kop	Ken Hughes; John Huston; Joseph McGrath; Robert Parrish; Richard Talmadge	Uncredited
1967	I Killed Rasputin	Mounia Golovine	Robert Hossein	
1967	Stranger in the House	Angela Sawyer	Pierre Rouve	
1967	A Countess from Hong Kong	Girl at Dance	Charlie Chaplin	
1967	Peppermint Frappé	Elena / Ana	Carlos Saura	
1968	Stress Is Three	Teresa	Carlos Saura	
1969	Honeycomb	Teresa	Carlos Saura	
1970	The Hawaiians	Purity Hoxworth	Tom Gries	
1970	The Garden of Delights	Woman in Church	Carlos Saura	Uncredited
1971	Perched on a Tree	Mrs. Muller	Serge Korber	
1972	Innocent Bystanders	Miriam Loman	Peter Collinson	
1972	Z.P.G.	Carol McNeil	Michael Campus	Maria Award for Best Actress
1972	A House Without Boundaries	Lucía Alfaro	Pedro Olea	
1973	Ana and the Wolves	Ana	Carlos Saura	
1973	The Three Musketeers	Anne of Austria	Richard Lester	
1973	Marriage a la Mode	Marie des Anges	Michel Mardore	
1973	Yankee Dudler	Kate Elder	Volker Vogeler	
1974	The Four Musketeers	Anne of Austria	Richard Lester	
1974	¿...Y el prójimo?	Luisa	Ángel del Pozo	
1974	Sommerfuglene	Anne Zimmler	Chris Boger	
1975	Cría cuervos	Ana / Maria	Carlos Saura	
1975	Nashville	Opal	Robert Altman	Nominated – Golden Globe Award for Best Supporting Actress
1976	Buffalo Bill and the Indians, or Sitting Bull's History Lesson	Annie Oakley	Robert Altman	
1976	Welcome to L.A.	Karen Hood	Alan Rudolph	Nominated – BAFTA Award for Best Supporting Actress
1976	Scrim	Ann	Jacob Bijl	
1976	Noroît	Morag	Jacques Rivette	
1977	Roseland	Marilyn	James Ivory	
1977	Elisa, vida mía	Elisa Santamaria / Elisa's Mother	Carlos Saura	
1977	In Memoriam	Paulina Arevalo	Enrique Brasó	
1978	Remember My Name	Emily	Alan Rudolph	Miami International Film Festival Award for Best Actress; Paris Film Festival Award for Best Actress
1978	A Wedding	Rita Billingsley	Robert Altman	
1978	One Page of Love	Lise	Maurice Rabinowicz	
1978	Blindfolded Eyes	Emilia	Carlos Saura	
1979	L'Adoption	Catherine	Marc Grunebaum	
1979	Mama Turns 100	Ana	Carlos Saura	
1979	The Widow of Montiel	Adelaida	Miguel Littín	
1979	Mais ou et donc Ornicar	Isabelle	Bertrand Van Effenterre	
1980	Le Voyage en douce	Lucie	Michel Deville	
1980	The Mirror Crack'd	Ella Zielinsky	Guy Hamilton	
1983	Life Is a Bed of Roses	Nora Winkle	Alain Resnais	
1984	Love on the Ground	Charlotte	Jacques Rivette	
1984	Les Uns et les Autres	Suzanne / Sara Glenn	Claude Lelouch	
1987	White Mischief	Nina Soames	Michael Radford	
1988	The Moderns	Nathalie de Ville	Alan Rudolph	
1989	The Return of the Musketeers	Queen Anne of Austria	Richard Lester	
1989	I Want to Go Home	Terry Armstrong	Alain Resnais	
1990	Gentille Alouette	Angela Duverger	Sergio Castilla	
1990	The Children	Joyce Wheater	Tony Palmer	
1991	Buster's Bedroom	Diana Daniels	Rebecca Horn	
1992	Off Season	The Anarchist	Daniel Schmid	
1992	Chaplin	Hannah Chaplin	Richard Attenborough	Nominated – Golden Globe Award for Best Supporting Actress
1993	A Foreign Field	Beverly	Charles Sturridge	
1993	The Age of Innocence	Mrs. Welland	Martin Scorsese	
1994	Words Upon the Window Pane	Miss McKenna	Mary McGuckian	
1995	Para recibir el canto de los pájaros	Catherine	Jorge Sanjinés	
1995	Home for the Holidays	Aunt Gladys	Jodie Foster	
1996	Jane Eyre	Miss Scatcherd	Franco Zeffirelli	
1996	Os Olhos da Ásia	Jane Powell	João Mário Grilo	
1996	Crimetime	Thelma	George Sluizer	
1997	The Odyssey	Eurycleia	Andrei Konchalovsky	
1998	Cousin Bette	Adeline Hulot	Des McAnuff	
1998	Finisterre, donde termina el mundo	Mother	Xavier Villaverde	
1999	To Walk with Lions	Victoria Anrecelli	Carl Schultz	
1999	Beresina, or the Last Days of Switzerland	Charlotte De	Daniel Schmid	
2000	¿Tú qué harías por amor?	Madre	Carlos Saura Medrano	
2002	The Faces of the Moon	Joan Turner	Guita Schyfter	
2002	In the City Without Limits	Marie	Antonio Hernández	Goya Award for Best Supporting Actress
2002	Talk to Her	Katerina Bilova	Pedro Almodóvar	
2004	The Bridge of San Luis Rey	The Abbess	Mary McGuckian	
2005	Heidi	Rottenmeier	Paul Marcus	
2005	BloodRayne	Fortune Teller	Uwe Boll	
2005	Oculto	Adele	Antonio Hernández	
2005	Melissa P.	Nonna Elvira	Luca Guadagnino	
2007	The Orphanage	Aurora	J. A. Bayona	Nominated – Goya Award for Best Supporting Actress
2007	Theresa: The Body of Christ	Priora	Ray Loriga	
2007	Miguel y William	La dueña	Inés París	
2007	Los Totenwackers	Salgado	Ibón Cormenzana	
2007	Boxes	Mother	Jane Birkin	
2008	Inconceivable	Frances Church-Chappel	Mary McGuckian	
2008	Parlami d'amore	Amelie	Silvio Muccino	
2008	Parc	Marteau's Mother	Arnaud des Pallières	
2008	Ramírez	Galerist	Albert Arizza	
2008	Diary of a Nymphomaniac	Abuela de Valére	Christian Molina	
2009	The Island Inside	Victoria	Dunia Ayaso; Félix Sabroso	
2009	Imago Mortis	Contessa Orsini	Stefano Bessoni	
2010	The Making of Plus One	Geri	Mary McGuckian	
2010	The Wolfman	Maleva	Joe Johnston	
2010	There Be Dragons	Abileyza	Roland Joffé	
2010	The Mosquito Net	María	Agustí Vila	
2010	The Trick in the Sheet	Alma	Alfonso Arau	
2011	¿Para qué sirve un oso?	Josephine	Tom Fernández	Málaga Spanish Film Festival Award for Best Supporting Actress
2011	The Monk	L'abbesse	Dominik Moll	
2011	Americano	Linda	Mathieu Demy	
2011	All Together	Annie	Stéphane Robelin	
2011	Memories of My Melancholy Whores	Rosa Cabarcas	Henning Carlsen	
2012	O Apóstolo	Dosinda (voice)	Fernando Cortizo	
2012	Un amor de película	Jean	Diego Musiak	
2012	The Impossible	Old Woman	J. A. Bayona	
2013	The Return	Coco Chanel	Karl Lagerfeld	Short film
2013	Three-60	Jean Christophe	Alejandro Ezcurdia	
2013	Another Me	Mrs. Brennan	Isabel Coixet	
2014	Amapola	Memé	Eugenio Zanetti	
2014	Sand Dollars	Anne	Laura Amelia Guzmán; Israel Cárdenas	Nominated – Ariel Award for Best Actress
2015	Marguerite & Julien	Lefebvre's mother	Valérie Donzelli	
2015	Valentin Valentin	Jane	Pascal Thomas	
2015	The Forbidden Room	The Master Passion / Nursemaid / Aunt Chance	Guy Maddin	
2015	Me and Kaminski	Therese	Wolfgang Becker	
2016	A Monster Calls	The Head Teacher	J. A. Bayona	
2017	Anchor and Hope	Germaine	Carlos Marques–Marcet	
2018	Jurassic World: Fallen Kingdom	Iris	J. A. Bayona	
2018	Red Land	Giulia Visantrìn Adulta	Maximiliano Hernando Bruno	
2019	Holy Beasts	Vera V.	Laura Amelia Guzmán; Israel Cárdenas	
2019	The Barefoot Emperor	Lady Liz	Jessica Woodworth	
2019	Los Rodríguez y el Más Allá	Isabel	Paco Arango	
2021	98 Segundos Sin Sombra	Clara Luz	Juan Pablo Richter	
2023	Luka	The General	Jessica Woodworth	
2023	Seneca – On the Creation of Earthquakes	Cecilia	Robert Schwentke	

=== Television ===
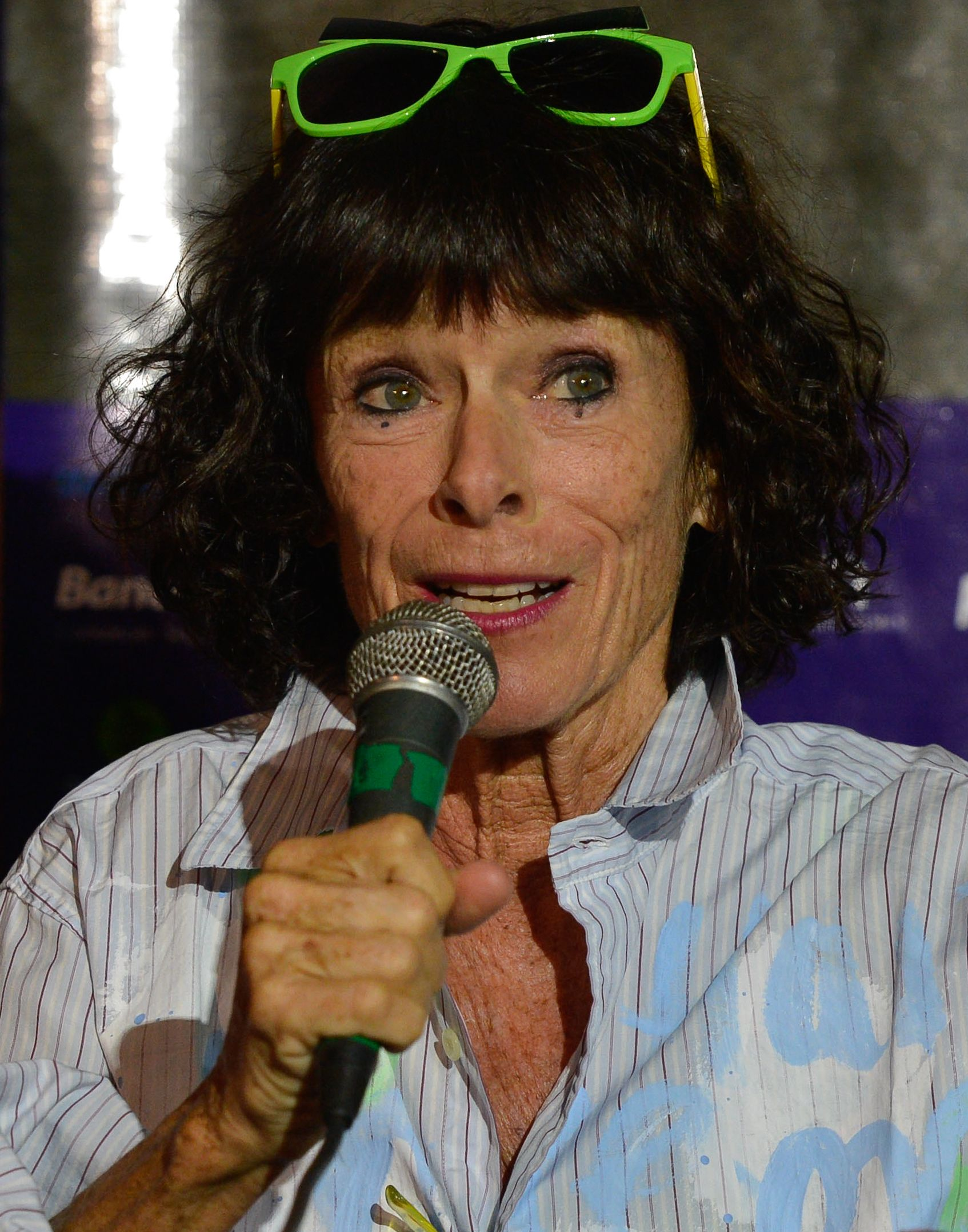
Chaplin in 2014

Year	Film	Role	Notes
1967	La familia Colón	Silvia	Episode: "Esa muchacha llamada Silvia como una golondrina"
1967	The Danny Thomas Hour	Donna (Hippie Girl)	Episode: "The Scene"
1971	Carlos	Lisa	Television film
1973	Nefertiti y Aquenatos	Nefertiti	Television film
1978	The Word	Naomi Dunn	Miniseries; 4 episodes
1978	Short Letter to the Long Goodbye	Judith Seldan	Television film
1981	The House of Mirth	Lily Bart	Television film
1983	My Cousin Rachel	Contessa Rachel Sangalletti	Miniseries; 4 episodes
1985	The Corsican Brothers	Madame Savilia de Franchi	Television film
1991	Duel of Hearts	Mrs. Miller	Television film
1993	Screen One	Beverly	Episode: "A Foreign Field"
1996	Gulliver's Travels	Empress Munodi	Miniseries; 1 episodes
1997	The Odyssey	Eurycleia of Ithaca	Miniseries; 2 episodes
1997	Mother Teresa: In the Name of God's Poor	Mother Teresa	Television film
1999	Mary, Mother of Jesus	Elizabeth	Television film
2000	In the Beginning	Jochebed	Miniseries; 2 episodes
2002	Dinotopia	Oriana	Miniseries; 1 episode
2003	Winter Solstice	Gloria Blundell	Television film
2004	A Christmas Carol	Ghost of Christmas Yet to Come / Blind Beggarwoman	Television film
2006	Agatha Christie's Marple	Mrs. Fane	Episode: "Sleeping Murder"
2006	Les Aventuriers des mers du Sud	Maggie	Television film
2012	The Hollow Crown	Alice	Episode: "Henry V"
2013	Jo	Liliane Coberg	Episode: "Place de la Concorde"
2016	Beyond the Walls	Rose	Miniseries; 3 episodes
2017	Electric Dreams	Irma	Episode: "Impossible Planet"
2019	The Crown	Wallis, Duchess of Windsor	Supporting role (season 3); 2 episodes
2020	Britannia	Queen Mother of Amena	Season 2, Episode 5
