= Alcove Entertainment =

Film production company

- Industry: Film
- Founded: 2005
- Headquarters: London, United Kingdom, Dubai, United Arab Emirates
- Key people: Amina Dasmal; Robin Fox
- Website: Official website UK, Official website UAE

Alcove Entertainment is an independent film production and finance company, based in the UK and the UAE. Alcove Entertainment has occasionally acted as a distributor for its own films. The company was founded by Amina Dasmal and Robin Fox in 2005.

== Company ==
Alcove Entertainment was co-founded by producer and UAE native Amina Dasmal and producer Robin Fox in 2005.

Alcove Entertainment produced The Double, a comedy co-written and directed by BAFTA-award nominated Richard Ayoade and co-developed and co-financed by Film 4. Based on an original idea by Avi Korine, The Double, co-written by Ayoade and Korine and inspired by Fyodor Dostoyevsky's novella of the same name, tells the story of an insignificant man driven to near breakdown by the appearance of his doppelganger. Jesse Eisenberg and Mia Wasikowska lead the cast that includes Yasmin Paige, James Fox, Wallace Shawn, Noah Taylor and Cathy Moriarty.

The Double debuted at the 2013 Toronto International Film Festival to critical acclaim and has been selected to screen in competition at both London Film Festival 2013 and Tokyo International Film Festival. The film is being released through StudioCanal in the UK in Spring 2014.

Alcove Entertainment's first feature Cochochi, a production with Gael García Bernal and Diego Luna's production company Canana, won the Discovery Award at the 2007 Toronto International Film Festival, in addition to the Grand Jury Prize at the Miami International Film Festival in 2008. Subsequent films include Harmony Korine's Trash Humpers, which was awarded the Grand Jury prize at the CPH:DOX Film Festival in 2009. The film was distributed on DVD and VHS in the UK with Warp Films. The Caller, a supernatural thriller directed by Matthew Parkhill and written by Sergio Casci, starring Rachelle Lefevre, Stephen Moyer and Luis Guzman was picked up by Sony Pictures for distribution after premiering at the 2011 Berlinale Film Market.

Alcove Entertainment has made forays into theatre, beginning with the production and finance of James Fox's Lara & Zhivago, an adaptation of Boris Pasternak's Doctor Zhivago, and Nina Raine's Tiger Country at London's Hampstead Theatre

== Filmography ==
- The Boy in the Oak
- The Caller
- Cochochi
- The Double
- A Gaza Weekend
- Siren
- Trash Humpers
- Victoria Station
