= Kim Yeonkyung =

South Korean Russian literature scholar (born 1975)

Kim Yeonkyung (Korean: 김연경; born 1975) is a Korean writer, Russian literature scholar, and translator. As a translator, she has been mostly translating Dostoevsky's works into Korean. She also teaches Russian literature in university.

== Life ==
Kim was born in 1975 in Geo-chang, Gyeongsangnam-do, as the eldest daughter of a poor household, and grew up in Busan In 1993, she entered the Department of Russian Language and Literature, Seoul National University. During her college years, her elitism and sense of responsibility led her to think that "she should represent the less privileged." So she engaged in student activism, but she felt it was nothing but a series of chants detached from reality and became disillusioned.

Her career as a writer began after the literary journal Literature and Society published her short story "'Urineun he-eo-jyeotjiman, neo-ui chosangeun', geu sireul chajaseo (<우리는 헤어졌지만, 너의 초상은>, 그 시를 찾아서, In Search of the Poem 'We're Apart, but Your Countenance')", in its 1996 summer edition. Around that time, she started writing the novel Geureoni naega eojji nareul yongseohal su itgetneunga (그러니 내가 어찌 나를 용서할 수 있겠는가, So How Can I Forgive Myself), and made up her mind to finish writing the novel as well as a book about Dostoevsky's romanticism. The novel was published in 2003, seven years after her resolution.

Kim received a scholarship from the Russian government and got into Moscow State University of Education to study Dostoevsky's work. She obtained a doctor's degree and came back to Korea in 2004. While studying in Russia, she was busy translating Dostoevsky's novel Demons into Korean and writing her dissertation and novel. Since her return to her home country, she has continued to teach Russian literature at Seoul National University, to translate it, and to write her own stories and novels.

== Writing ==
Kim Yeonkyung's first short story collection, Goyang-i-ui goyang-i-e uihan goyang-i-reul wihan soseol (고양이의 고양이에 의한 고양이를 위한 소설, The Story of the Cat by the Cat for the Cat), poses persistent questions about self identity and explores the relationship between the self and the others. Especially, her debut work which is published in the collection, "'Urineun he-eo-jyeotjiman, neo-ui chosangeun', geu sireul chajaseo", drew the attention of critics at the time of her debut for "its fresh prose and unique style." Her following short story collections, Miseongnyeon (미성년, Underage) and Nae anaeui modeun geot (내 아내의 모든 것, All About My Wife), also stand out in their original prose and provocative experiment in style.

Her first full-length novel, Geureoni naega eojji nareul yongseohal su itgetneunga, tells the story of an unknown person who goes to a therapist after a 'suicide attempt' and the therapist who listens to the patient. Its prominent features are the conflict between the autobiographical and meta-fictional stories laid between the prologue and the epilogue, which is the first and the last chapter, respectively, and also its alternating storylines and statements told by different voices.

Her next novel, Dasi, Seuchimdeul (다시, 스침들 Again, Encounters), published in 2018, is set in a cafe called "Moby Dick" and tells a story about people who frequent that place. The daily lives in the big city and people with their own taste appear all over the book. The cafe Moby Dick, frequented by the five main characters, symbolizes a womb, a place where writing is born and resumed.

As a Russian literature scholar and translator, Kim has focused on studying and translating Dostoevsky's works. She acquired her doctor's degree for her research on The Double and wrote a number of papers on Russian literature. Her distinctive prose that puts significance on small things and the fact that some of her stories are set in Saint Petersburg are related to her experience of studying abroad and translating.

== Works ==
=== Short story collections ===
- 《고양이의 고양이에 의한 고양이를 위한 소설》, 문학과지성사, 1997 / Goyang-i-ui goyang-i-e uihan goyang-i-reul wihan soseol (The Story of the Cat by the Cat for the Cat), Moonji, 1997
- 《미성년》, 문학과지성사, 2000 / Miseongnyeon (Underage), Moonji, 2000
- 《내 아내의 모든 것》, 문학과지성사, 2005 / Nae anaeui modeun geot (All About My Wife), Moonji, 2005
- 《파우스트 박사의 오류》, 강, 2016 / Pa-u-seuteu baksa-ui oryu (The Fallacy of Doctor Faust), Gang, 2016

=== Novels ===
- 《그러니 내가 어찌 나를 용서할 수 있겠는가》, 문학과지성사, 2003 / Geureoni naega eojji nareul yongseohal su itgetneunga (So How Can I Forgive Myself), Moonji, 2003
- 《고양이의 이중생활》, 민음사, 2009 / Goyang-i-ui ijung saenghwal (The Double Life of a Cat), Mineumsa, 2009
- 《다시, 스침들》, 강, 2018 / Dasi, Seuchimdeul (Again, Encounters), Gang, 2018

=== Anthologies ===
- <불안>, 박성원 외, 《이상한 가역반응》, 문학과지성사, 2000 / "Buran (Anxiety)", Pak Seong-won et al., Isanghan gayeok baneung (Strange Reversible Reactions), Moonji, 2000
- <내 몸속의 곰팡이>, 강영숙 외, 《이상한 오렌지》, 이룸, 2001 / "Nae momsogui gompang-i (Mold in My Body)", Gang Yeong-suk et al., Isanghan oren-ji (Strange Orange), Irum, 2001

=== Prose collections ===
- 《살다, 읽다, 쓰다-세계문학 읽기 길잡이》, 민음사, 2019 / Salda, irkda, sseuda: segye munhak irkgi giljabi (Live, Read, Write: Manual for Reading World Literature), Mineumsa, 2019

=== Translations ===
- Фёдор Достоевский, Бесы, 1872 / 《악령》 상⸱하, 김연경 역, 열린책들, 2002
- Фёдор Достоевский, Бра́тья Карама́зовы, 1880 / 《카라마조프 가의 형제들》 1-3, 김연경 역, 민음사, 2007
- Фёдор Достоевский, Записки изъ подполья, 1864 / 《지하로부터의 수기》, 김연경 역, 민음사, 2010
- Михаи́л Ле́рмонтов, Герой нашего времени, 1840 / 《우리 시대의 영웅》, 김연경 역, 문학동네, 2010
- Фёдор Достоевский, Преступленіе и наказаніе, 1866 / 《죄와 벌》 1-2, 김연경 역, 민음사, 2012
- Бори́с Пастерна́к, До́ктор Жива́го, 1957 / 《닥터 지바고》, 김연경 역, 민음사, 2019
