= Nefertiti y Aquenatos =

1973 film

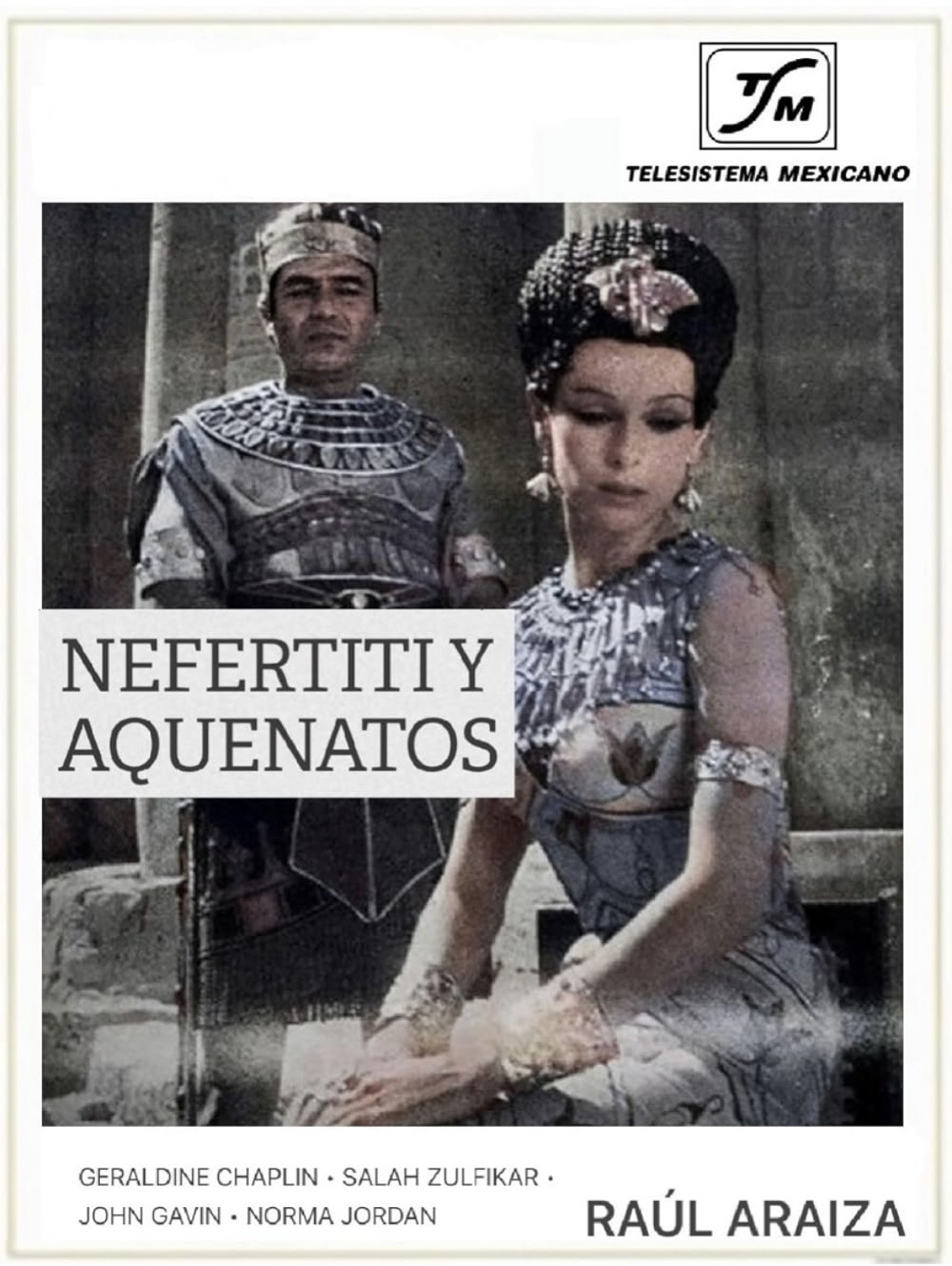
- Screenplay by: Myron J. Gold
- Directed by: Raúl Araiza
- Starring: Geraldine Chaplin; Salah Zulfikar
- Country of origin: Mexico
- Original language: Spanish

Production
- Producers: Miguel Alemán Velasco; Óscar Dancigers
- Cinematography: Álex Phillips Jr.
- Running time: 30 minutes
- Production company: Telesistema Mexicano S.A.

Original release
- Release: 18 September 1973

Nefertiti y Aquenatos (English: Nefertiti and Akhenaten) is a 1973 Mexican television short film directed by Raúl Araiza. It stars Geraldine Chaplin as Nefertiti, Salah Zulfikar as Horemheb and John Gavin as Akhenaten. The film was produced by Telesistema Mexicano S.A.

== Cast ==
- Geraldine Chaplin as Nefertiti
- Salah Zulfikar as Horemheb
- John Gavin as Akhenaten
- Norma Jordan as Unknown character

== See also ==
- Short film
- 1973 in film
- Salah Zulfikar filmography
