= Holy Beasts =

2019 film

- Film poster
- Spanish: La Fiera y la Fiesta
- Directed by: Laura Amelia Guzmán and Israel Cárdenas
- Starring: Geraldine Chaplin; Udo Kier
- Release date: 8 February 2019 (Berlin)
- Running time: 90 minutes
- Country: Dominican Republic
- Language: Spanish

Holy Beasts (Spanish: La Fiera y la Fiesta; lit. 'The Fiera and the Party') is a 2019 Dominican drama film directed by Laura Amelia Guzmán and Israel Cárdenas. It was selected as the Dominican entry for the Best International Feature Film at the 94th Academy Awards.

== Plot ==
Vera, a former celebrated actress, is preparing to shoot her final film, which serves as a tribute to one of her closest friends, the filmmaker Jean-Louis Jorge. In order to complete the project, she must confront and overcome the unresolved traumas and memories from her distant past.

== Cast ==
- Geraldine Chaplin as Vera
- Udo Kier as Henry

== See also ==
- List of submissions to the 94th Academy Awards for Best International Feature Film
- List of Dominican submissions for the Academy Award for Best International Feature Film
