= Trash Humpers =

2009 American film by Harmony Korine

- Theatrical release poster
- Directed by: Harmony Korine
- Written by: Harmony Korine
- Produced by: Charles-Marie Anthonioz; Amina Dasmal; Robin Fox
- Starring: Rachel Korine; Brian Kotzur; Travis Nicholson; Harmony Korine
- Cinematography: Harmony Korine
- Edited by: Leo Scott
- Production companies: Alcove Entertainment; Warp Films; O' Salvation
- Distributed by: Drag City
- Release date: September 12, 2009 (TIFF)
- Running time: 78 minutes 97 minutes (2010)
- Country: United States
- Language: English

Trash Humpers is a 2009 American experimental black comedy film written and directed by Harmony Korine. Shot on worn VHS home video, the film features a "loser-gang cult-freak collective" engaging in bizarre and destructive behavior on the streets of Nashville, Tennessee.

== Plot ==
The film opens with multiple shots of a gang of elderly individuals humping trash cans. The gang is then shown trespassing, partaking in vandalism, destruction of property and disturbing the peace on the streets of Nashville. They interact with a young boy, both mocking him for failing to shoot baskets and encouraging his own violent and disturbing tendencies, and celebrate the birthday of their oldest member Buddy, who spends much of the celebration on the toilet suffering constipation.

Throughout the film, the characters participate in a variety of depraved and unpleasant activities, like making two men (wearing hospital gowns and adjoining hats) eat pancakes covered in dish soap. All their activities involve elements of peer pressure or ritualistic antics. Baby dolls are a recurring motif, which the Trash Humpers destroy by dragging behind their bicycles or "asphyxiating" them with plastic bags. The Trash Humpers meet a cross-dressing poet (played by Chris Gantry), whom they later accidentally kill, and a "comedian" whose jokes consist of crude, bigoted statements with no punchlines.

Hervé, the Trash Humper who has been "filming" much of the activity, gives a speech expounding on the group's philosophy. Momma, the only female Trash Humper, asks God for guidance; she decides to kidnap an actual baby from a home, and the film ends with Momma singing a lullaby to the baby in the street.

== Cast ==
- Rachel Korine as Momma
- Brian Kotzur as Buddy
- Travis Nicholson as Travis
- Harmony Korine as Hervé

== Production ==
Walking his dog late at night in the back alleys of his hometown of Nashville, Korine encountered trash bins strewn across the ground in what he imagined as a war zone. Overhead lights beamed down upon the trash in a Broadway-style that Korine found very dramatic. They began to resemble human form, beaten, abused and "very humpable". Korine remembered, as a teenager growing up in Nashville, a group of elderly peeping toms who would come out at night. He has described them as "the neighborhood boogeymen who worked at Krispy Kreme and would wrap themselves in shrubbery, cover themselves with dirt, and peep through the windows of other neighbors." Putting these two ideas together, Korine found conception for the film.

As a child of the 1980s, Korine grew up in the age of VHS. He remembers his first camera, given to him by his father, and reusing the tape over and over again. "There was something interesting about certain images or scenes bubbling up to the surface." On the rationale for using V.H.S. as the medium for Trash Humpers, Korine stated "There's this obsession nowadays with technology and the fact that everything looks so clear. Everything needs to be so high-definition. There was a strange beauty in the analog. You almost have to squint to see things through the grain and the mist. There's something sinister about it."

Upset over the bureaucracy in producing his previous and still most expensive feature, Mister Lonely, Korine aimed to make his next film as fast as he could, analogous to the free-form immediacy of painter and canvas. As a self-proclaimed "mistakist artist", Korine encouraged spontaneity. Like Julien Donkey-Boy, the script was merely a collection of written-down ideas. Before filming, Korine shot lo-fi images of people in costumes late at night to help find his aesthetic.

Filming lasted only a couple of weeks. "Once everyone was in their character and their costume, and I had figured out the structure of it, the randomness, the anti-aesthetic, it was really the performers, the Trash Humpers, walking around at night, videotaping each other doing these things," Korine recalled. "We would just walk around and sleep under bridges or behind a strip mall somewhere. We'd get these big tractor tires and make a nest to sleep in." Korine adds, "it was pretty intense because there were no breaks. It was just constant. Korine says that he didn't think traditionally about scenes, sounds, or color during filming, but more about being true to a feeling. "If it feels right to me. If there is some strong, palpable, raw quality in the moment then I won't question it." Korine himself plays as one of the Trash Humpers.

Korine cut the film on two VCRs to instill an approximate randomness. "I wanted a kind of incidental awkwardness, like maybe the guy taping it had turned it off and on." Korine often cites that in the creation of the film he aimed to mimic a found object or artifact. He even flirted with the idea of "leaving the film on a sidewalk somewhere" or placing various parts of the film at different flea markets to be unearthed at random and eventually put together as a whole, but ultimately decided he would claim ownership when he realized the copyright could not hold that way.

At the film's premiere in Toronto, Korine informed the audience that the title was to be taken literally and those likely to walk out were given due warning. In an interview, he stated, "That's why I named it Trash Humpers, because I didn't want to fool anyone." There were only four months between the beginning of filming and the world premiere.

For Korine, Trash Humpers is an elaborate portrait of the "American Landscape": a series of "park garages, back alleyways, and beautiful lamp posts that light up the gutter." Korine has repeatedly emphasized his use of street lamps and how they are for him deeply representative of America.

Korine sees the film as an ode to vandalism. "I have a real deep love and admiration for these characters. Not for what they do, but for the way they do it." "There can be a creative beauty in their mayhem and destruction. You could say these characters are poets or mystics of mayhem ... comedic with a vaudevillian horror." Korine wondered "whether this might make mainstream society envious of their social freedom."

== Reception ==
On review aggregator Rotten Tomatoes, Trash Humpers holds a 59% approval rating, based on 39 reviews, and an average rating of 5.5/10. Its consensus reads, "It's oddly affecting in a deeply discomforting way, but Trash Humpers pales in comparison with Harmony Korine's earlier, truly transgressive work." On Metacritic, the film holds a score of 33 out of 100 based on 11 reviews from critics, indicating "generally unfavorable reviews".

Rob Nelson of Variety remarked that the film is highly unlikely to gratify all audiences, and questioned what its notability would have been without the director's "hipster celebrity". However, intrigued by the film, he commented the cinematography as having "no small share of perverse beauty, particularly for those who miss the charming imperfections of videocassettes in this squeaky-clean digital era."

Jim Emerson of RogerEbert.com said of the film: "It's like watching a homemade VHS made by some anonymous high school gang of mildly pervy, goofball friends to amuse themselves one weekend when they had nothing better to do," and "Like all of Korine's output, Trash Humpers is art presented as trash or the other way around – in this case, something like pretentious 1980s 'performance art' captured on VHS."

The film won the DOX Award at the Copenhagen International Documentary Festival in November 2009.

== Soundtrack ==
The soundtrack to the film was released by Drag City on 7" in a limited run of 500 copies, with each sleeve "hand-filthed" and signed by director Harmony Korine.

1. "Trashy Torch Song Lullaby" (1:21)
2. "Rumble" (0:22)
3. "Night Time" (1:16)
4. "Three Little Devils" (0:50)
5. "Chitshit" (0:49)
6. "Kitchen Strangulation" (2:07)
7. "You Girls Sure Suck Large Fat Penis" (5:06)
8. "Sweet Night" (0:51)
9. "Sleep My Darlin" (2:11)
