= Rachelle Lefevre =

Canadian actress (born 1979)

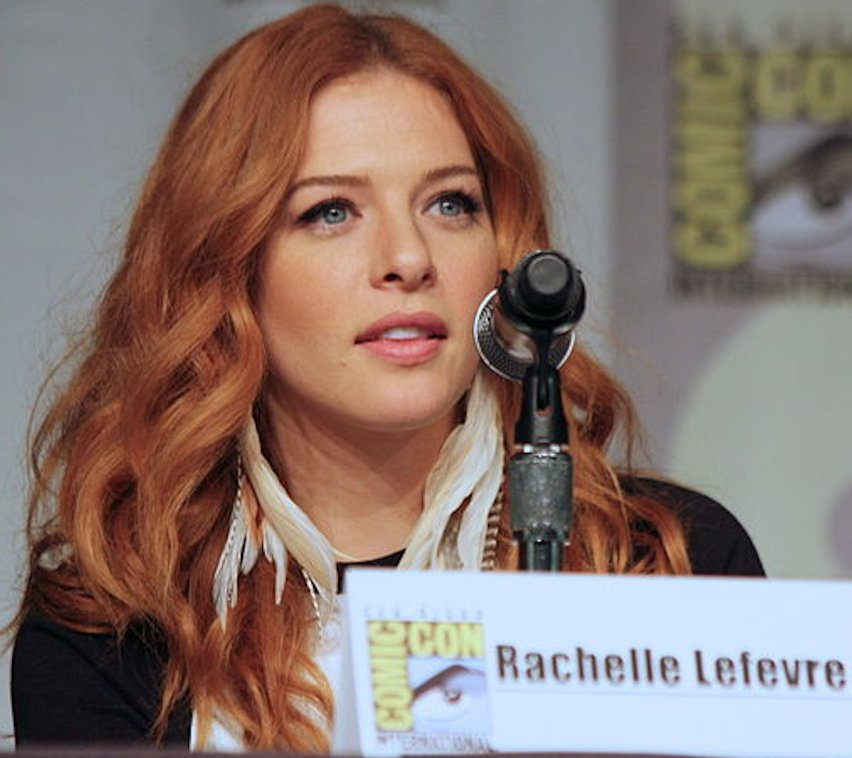
- Lefevre at the 2013 San Diego Comic-Con
- Born: Rachelle Marie Lefevre; February 1, 1979 (age 47); Montreal, Quebec, Canada
- Citizenship: Canada; United States
- Occupation: Actress
- Years active: 1999–present
- Spouse: Chris Crary (m. 2015)
- Children: 2

Rachelle Marie Lefevre (/ləˈfɛv/ lə-FEV, French: [ʁaʃɛl maʁi ləfɛvʁ]; born February 1, 1979) is a Canadian actress. She starred in the first season of the television series Big Wolf on Campus (1999) and had recurring roles in What About Brian, Boston Legal, and Swingtown. She played the vampire Victoria in the first two films of the Twilight saga. In 2011, she starred in the ABC medical drama Off the Map, followed by the CBS series A Gifted Man (2011–2012) and Under the Dome (2013–2015). In 2019, she starred in the FOX legal series Proven Innocent.

== Early life ==
Lefevre was born in Montreal, Quebec, where she was raised by an English teacher father and a psychologist mother. Her father's family was originally from France and Northern Ireland, and her mother is Jewish. Her stepfather is a rabbi. Lefevre was raised in a non-denominational household, and identifies as Jewish. She has three sisters and speaks both English and French, though she grew up mostly speaking English. Lefevre attended Centennial Academy, a private high school, and later studied creative arts at Dawson College. She studied theater for two summers at the Walnut Hill School in Natick, Massachusetts, and began a degree in education and literature at McGill University.

== Career ==
=== Early acting career ===
While working as a waitress at a sushi bar in Westmount, a regular customer, a Canadian television producer, overheard Lefevre telling the hostess that she wanted to be an actress. The producer got Lefevre her first audition, for a role in the sitcom Student Bodies. She did not yet have a head shot, so she turned in a Polaroid picture. She did not land the part, but got a call back from the casting director, leading to a role in the Canadian TV series Big Wolf on Campus in 1999, playing Stacey Hanson. Lefevre continued attending McGill between shoots, but never finished her degree.

Lefevre appeared in the film Confessions of a Dangerous Mind, directed by George Clooney, in 2002. She appeared in the television movies Picking Up and Dropping Off with Scott Wolf, and See Jane Date, and had a role in the romantic comedy Hatley High in 2003. In 2004, she played Etta Place in the Calgary-filmed TV movie The Legend of Butch and Sundance. Lefevre moved to West Hollywood that year and appeared in the films Noel, directed by Chazz Palminteri and starring Penélope Cruz, and Head in the Clouds, also starring Cruz and Charlize Theron. In April 2004, Lefevre filmed the mystery-thriller The River King in Halifax, opposite Edward Burns.

Lefevre starred on the Fox sitcom Life on a Stick in 2005, playing Lily Ashton, a mall fast-food restaurant employee, and then appeared on the Fox series Pool Guys. She has guest-starred on numerous other TV series, including: Charmed, playing Olivia Callaway on the episode "Love's a Witch", playing Annie Isles in season five of Undressed, and appearing on the short-lived ABC series What About Brian for 11 episodes. Lefevre was cast as Annie Cartwright, the female lead in ABC's Life on Mars, a David E. Kelley remake of the original British TV series. She shot a pilot episode, but was replaced by Gretchen Mol when the series was revamped.

=== Twilight ===
Lefevre played the renegade vampire Victoria in the film Twilight (2008), based on the novel of the same name by Stephenie Meyer. Lefevre wrote an impassioned letter to the director, explaining her desire to work with the filmmaker. Lefevre described the essence of her character as "pure evil, pure instinct, pure malice, and very feline". After reading that the author used the word "feline" to describe her character's agility, Lefevre watched lion attacks on YouTube to separate the movements of her character from those of normal people. She also took trapeze classes in preparation for the wire work in the film. Lefevre spent hours working on the costumes for her character, and described herself as "obsessed" with vampires after reading Bram Stoker's Dracula at the age of 14.

Lefevre was, at times, overwhelmed by the scrutiny she received from her involvement with Twilight. She participated in a promotional tour in November 2008, where she met and signed autographs for Twilight fans at Hot Topic stores in the U.S. "It's the closest I will ever come in my life to being a rock star," she told The Canadian Press, describing an appearance on MuchMusic, where over 1,500 fans showed up in Toronto. Over 2,500 fans showed up at a Wal-Mart in Salt Lake City, where Lefevre appeared to promote the DVD release of the film. Overall though, Lefevre described herself as delighted by the attention and excitement of the fans. She appeared in New Moon, the film's sequel, based on Meyer's second novel, which she completed shooting in Vancouver in May 2009.

Lefevre did not reprise her role of Victoria in Eclipse, the third film of the Twilight series, and was replaced by Bryce Dallas Howard. Summit Entertainment, the studio behind the films, attributed the change to scheduling conflicts; Eclipse and Barney's Version, an independent Canadian feature Lefevre had signed on to, both began filming on August 17, 2009. Lefevre responded that she was "stunned" by the decision and "greatly saddened" not to continue her portrayal of Victoria, and never thought she would "lose the role over a 10 day overlap", in a statement to Access Hollywood. The studio responded in a counter-statement, "The Twilight Saga: Eclipse is an ensemble production that has to accommodate the schedules of numerous actors while respecting the established creative vision of the filmmaker and most importantly the story." Lefevre had appeared at the 2009 San Diego Comic-Con to promote New Moon the weekend before she was replaced.

Enthusiastic fans of the series reacted to the news of Lefevre's replacement with online petitions urging her return, and "Bring Back Rachelle" became a top-trending topic on Twitter on the afternoon of July 29, 2009. Lefevre told Extra that she was "absolutely blown away" by support from fans, who also made her a tribute video on YouTube. Lefevre did not attend the Los Angeles premiere of New Moon, tweeting that the event "was just 2 emotional 4 me & I couldn't manage it."(sic)

=== 2009–present ===
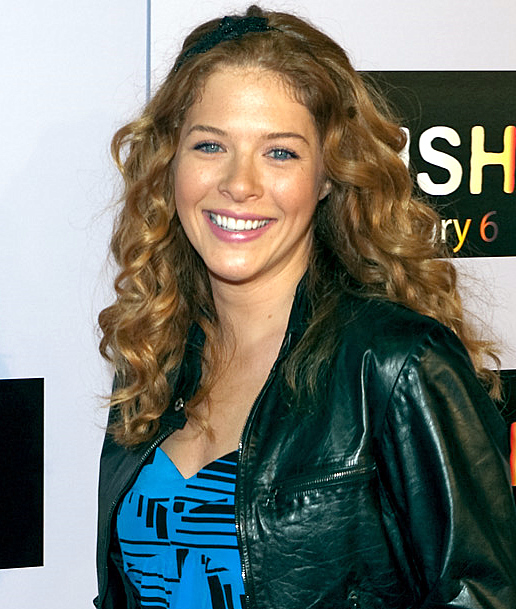
Lefevre at the film premiere for Push in January 2009

In 2009, Lefevre appeared in the CBC Television miniseries The Summit, filmed in Ontario, and completed the film Casino Jack, starring Kevin Spacey. In Casino Jack, she plays Emily J. Miller, a former press secretary for U.S. congressman Tom DeLay, who helped convict lobbyist Jack Abramoff (Kevin Spacey) in a political scandal involving Native American tribes.

Lefevre appeared in Barney's Version, a film adaptation of the award-winning Canadian novel by Mordecai Richler. Lefevre plays Clara, a manic depressive feminist poet who becomes the first wife of protagonist Barney Panofsky (Paul Giamatti). Her scenes were filmed in Rome in August 2009. The production continued on location in Montreal and New York City. Soon after the shoot, in November 2009, Lefevre shot the suspense film The Caller in Puerto Rico along with actors Lorna Raver and Stephen Moyer. She replaced Brittany Murphy, who had exited the project.

Lefevre appeared in the pilot episode of the ABC drama series The Deep End on January 21, 2010. She starred in the drama series Off the Map as Dr. Ryan Clark, a young doctor working in a South American medical clinic. Developed by Grey's Anatomy creator Shonda Rhimes, the series was filmed in Hawaii, debuted on January 12, 2011 and ran for 13 episodes before being canceled. Lefevre was the voice of the 31st annual Genie Awards in March 2011, along with host William Shatner. She was also cast in the NBC pilot, Reconstruction (working title: The Crossing), a drama set during the American Civil War. Lefevre plays Anna, a widow who begins an affair with a soldier.

In 2011, Lefevre joined the cast of the CBS TV drama, A Gifted Man, playing a doctor. Beginning in June 2013, Lefevre starred in the CBS summer thriller, Under the Dome, based on the 2009 best-selling novel of the same name by Stephen King. Lefevre joined an ensemble cast. The series was filmed in Wilmington, North Carolina, which lasted for three seasons on the network, ending in September 2015.

In 2017, Lefevre joined the cast of Global's critically acclaimed original TV series, Mary Kills People for season two, premiering in January 2018. The series stars Caroline Dhavernas as Mary. Lefevre plays Olivia, sister of a victim from season one, who attempts to blackmail Mary.

In 2019, she played the lead role of Madeline Scott in the Fox legal drama Proven Innocent. The show was cancelled after one season.

== Personal life and charity work ==
In 2009, Lefevre donated $100 for every 10,000 people who followed her on Twitter to Susan G. Komen for the Cure, a breast cancer charity. She also launched an eBay auction for the charity School on Wheels in August 2009, which provides tutoring to homeless children in Southern California. Lefevre sold t-shirts and other merchandise signed by her fellow cast members from Twilight. She is also an active supporter of Best Friends Animal Society, appearing in a public service announcement on behalf of the organization in November 2009, urging the public to adopt their next pet. Lefevre is a socialist. She became an American citizen and endorsed Senator Bernie Sanders for president in the 2016 U.S. presidential election.

She is married to Chris Crary and has two children.

== Filmography ==
=== Film ===
Year	Title	Role	Notes
1999	The Legend of Sleepy Hollow	Katrina Van Tassle	
2000	Stardom	Catherine	
2001	Life in the Balance	Kristy Carswell	
2001	Dead Awake	Randi Baum	
2002	Abandon	Eager Beaver	
2002	Confessions of a Dangerous Mind	Tuvia, Age 25	
2003	Deception	Denise	Straight-to-DVD film
2003	Hatley High	Hyacinthe Marquez	
2004	The Big Thing	Sarah	
2004	Head in the Clouds	Alice	
2004	Noel	Holly	
2005	The River King	Carlin Leander	
2005	Pure	Julie	
2007	Suffering Man's Charity	Elaine	
2007	Fugitive Pieces	Naomi	
2008	Prom Wars	Sabina	
2008	Twilight	Victoria	
2009	The Twilight Saga: New Moon	Victoria	Teen Choice Award for Choice Movie Villain; Teen Choice Award for Most Fanatic Fans (Shared with the Twilight cast)
2010	Barney's Version	Clara	Nominated — ACTRA Montreal Award for Outstanding Performance – Female; Premiered at 67th Venice International Film Festival
2010	Casino Jack	Emily Miller	also known as Bagman
2011	The Pool Boys	Laura	also known as American Summer
2011	The Caller	Mary Kee	
2012	Omertà	Sophie	also known as Omertà: The Movie
2012	The Twilight Saga: Breaking Dawn – Part 2	Victoria (original incarnation)	Archive footage
2013	White House Down	Melanie	
2013	Pawn Shop Chronicles	Sandy	
2013	Homefront	Susan Hetch	
2013	The Legend of Sarila	Apik	Voice role
2014	Reclaim	Shannon	
2016	Edge of Winter	Karen	also known as Backcountry
2017	Hollow in the Land	Charlene	
2025	Ethan Bloom	Rabbi Dani	

=== Television ===
Year	Title	Role	Notes
1999	Big Wolf on Campus	Stacey Hanson	Main role (season 1)
1999	The Legend of Sleepy Hollow	Katrina Van Tassel	Television film
2000	The Hunger	Smallpox Woman	Episode: "Double"
2002	Bliss	Marine	Episode: "The Value of X"
2002	Galidor: Defenders of the Outer Dimension	Tyreena	Episode: "Relativity"
2002	Undressed	Annie Isles	6 episodes
2003	Largo Winch	Catarina	Episode: "Skin Deep"
2003	See Jane Date	Eloise	Television film
2003	Charmed	Olivia Callaway	Episode: "Love's a Witch"
2003	Picking Up & Dropping Off	Georgia	Television film
2004	Petits mythes urbains	Receptionist #1	Episode: "Scalpel illégitime"
2004	The Legend of Butch & Sundance	Etta Place	Television film
2005	Pool Guys	Alana	Unsold TV pilot
2005	Life on a Stick	Lily	Main role
2005	Bones	Amy Morton	Episode: "A Man on Death Row"
2006	Veronica Mars	Marjorie	Episode: "My Big Fat Greek Rush Week"
2006	The Class	Sue	2 episodes
2006	Four Kings	Lauren	2 episodes
2006	What About Brian	Heather	Main role (season 2), 11 episodes
2007	How I Met Your Mother	Sarah	Episode: "Moving Day"
2007	The Closer	Michelle Morgan	Episode: "Saving Face"
2007	CSI: NY	Devon Maxford	Episode: "You Only Die Once"
2008	Boston Legal	Dana Strickland	3 episodes
2008	Life on Mars	Annie Cartwright	Unaired pilot
2008	Swingtown	Melinda	Recurring role, 5 episodes
2008	Eli Stone	Candace Bonneville	Episode: "Should I Stay or Should I Go?"
2008	The Summit	Leonie Adderly	Television miniseries
2009	Do You Know Me	Elsa Carter / Sophie Marsaretti	Television film
2009	Better Off Ted	Rebecca	Episode: "Secrets and Lives"
2009	CSI: Crime Scene Investigation	Kumari	Episode: "Leave Out All the Rest"
2010	The Deep End	Katie Campbell	2 episodes
2011	Off the Map	Dr. Ryan Clark	Main role
2011	Reconstruction	Anna	Television film
2011–2012	A Gifted Man	Dr. Kate Sykora	Main role
2013–2015	Under The Dome	Julia Shumway	Main role
2015	King of the Nerds	Herself	Episode: "Nuclear Nerd Games"
2017	Law & Order: Special Victims Unit	Nadine Lachere	Episode: "Chasing Theo"
2017	Philip K. Dick's Electric Dreams	Katie	Episode: "Real Life"
2017	Battle of the Network Stars	Herself	Episode: "Doctors vs. Famous TV Families"
2018	Mary Kills People	Olivia Bloom	Main role (season 2)
2019	Proven Innocent	Madeline Scott	Main role
2020	The Sounds	Maggie Cabbott	Main role
2022	Law & Order	Nina Ellis	Episode: "Impossible Dream"
2022	Moriah's Lighthouse	Moriah	Main role, television film
2022	The Secrets of Bella Vista	Tess	Main role, television film
2024	Holidazed	Sylvie Woods	3 episodes
2025	Law & Order Toronto: Criminal Intent	Ellen Stewart	Episode: "Digital Lipstick"
2026	North of North	Kati Bloom	6 episodes
