= The Double (2013 film) =

2013 British film by Richard Ayoade

- British poster
- Directed by: Richard Ayoade
- Written by: Richard Ayoade; Avi Korine
- Story by: Avi Korine
- Based on: The Double by Fyodor Dostoyevsky
- Produced by: Robin C. Fox; Amina Dasmal
- Starring: Jesse Eisenberg; Mia Wasikowska; Wallace Shawn; Noah Taylor; Cathy Moriarty; James Fox
- Cinematography: Erik Wilson
- Edited by: Chris Dickens; Nick Fenton
- Music by: Andrew Hewitt
- Production companies: Alcove; BFI; Film4
- Distributed by: StudioCanal
- Release dates: 7 September 2013 (TIFF); 4 April 2014 (United Kingdom)
- Running time: 93 minutes
- Country: United Kingdom
- Language: English
- Box office: $2.3 million

The Double is a 2013 British black comedy thriller film written and directed by Richard Ayoade and starring Jesse Eisenberg and Mia Wasikowska. It is based on the 1846 novella The Double by Fyodor Dostoyevsky, about a man driven to breakdown when he is usurped by a doppelgänger. It was produced by Alcove Entertainment, with Michael Caine, Graeme Cox (Attercop), Tessa Ross (Film4) and Nigel Williams as executive producers.

== Plot ==
Downtrodden Simon James has worked at his office for seven years, but he is ignored by his boss, named The Colonel, and colleagues. From his apartment he spies on a beautiful co-worker he admires, Hannah, who lives in the apartment opposite him. He sees her throwing away art and secretly retrieves and admires it. One night, Simon sees a man jump to his death from the floor above Hannah's apartment. He talks to detectives, who explain that if the man had jumped a few feet to the right, he would have been badly hurt but would have survived. Simon takes Hannah to a restaurant where the waitress, Kiki, informs him that he has a call from his mother. When he returns to the table, Hannah is gone. Simon then trades his television in for money and buys a gift for Hannah.

At work, Simon's boss announces the arrival of a new employee, James Simon, who looks identical to Simon, which causes Simon to faint upon first glance. Assertive and charming, James is Simon's polar opposite. Much to Simon's annoyance, James not only gets respect from their co-workers but no one seems to notice that they are identical in appearance. James, on the other hand, does notice this and sees Simon's pain. Out of pity, he decides to buddy-up with Simon and the two have breakfast at Kiki’s restaurant. Later, they go to a bar where James gives Simon advice about how to seduce Hannah. Hannah then asks James on a date through Simon. On the date, Simon pretends to be James, with the real James giving him instructions via earpiece. When Simon becomes nervous, the two swap places and James kisses Hannah, angering Simon. James asks Simon to take an aptitude test in his place and seduces their boss's surly, rebellious daughter, Melanie, whom Simon was instructed to tutor, something he is reluctant to do.

Simon gets his revenge on James by revealing to Hannah that James is cheating on her with Melanie. Furious, James blackmails Simon for his apartment keys using explicit photos he took of himself with Melanie, knowing their boss will believe it is Simon in the photos. At work, Simon accuses James of being an imposter and is fired after going on a maniacal tirade. As he is about to kill himself, he sees Hannah lying unconscious in her apartment. He calls an ambulance and accompanies her to the hospital, where it is revealed that she not only overdosed but also miscarried (she had become pregnant after a sexual encounter with James). Simon then takes Hannah back home, relieved that she has survived. Still upset, however, Hannah states that she wanted to die and she suggests that Simon kill himself. She goes through Simon's jacket pockets and discovers earrings he had bought for her and her salvaged art.

Simon learns his mother has died and finds James at her funeral. Simon punches him and discovers that they share injuries; as James's nose bleeds, so does Simon's. He finds Hannah and tells her he wants to be noticed. He goes to his apartment and handcuffs the sleeping James to his bed, then goes to the ledge above Hannah's apartment, steps to the right, and jumps. He is badly hurt. Hannah runs to him and an ambulance arrives. Lacking medical attention, the handcuffed James appears to be on the brink of death as he lies motionless on the apartment floor.

Inside the ambulance, The Colonel and Hannah watch over Simon. The Colonel tells Simon that he is "special", to which the latter responds with a half-smile, "I'd like to think I'm pretty unique".

== Cast ==
- Jesse Eisenberg as Simon James/James Simon
- Mia Wasikowska as Hannah
- Wallace Shawn as Mr. Papadopoulos
- Noah Taylor as Harris
- Cathy Moriarty as Kiki
- James Fox as The Colonel
- Yasmin Paige as Melanie Papadopoulos
- Phyllis Somerville as Mrs. James
- Kobna Holdbrook-Smith as Guard/Doctor
- Tony Rohr as Rudolph
- Susan Blommaert as Liz
- Jon Korkes as Detective
- Tim Key as Care Worker
- Lloyd Woolf as Investigator
- Lydia Ayoade as Test Invigilator
- Sally Hawkins as Receptionist at Ball
- Saul Williams as Security at Ball
- J Mascis as Janitor
- Christopher Morris as Official
- Chris O'Dowd as Nurse
- Craig Roberts as Young Detective
- Kierston Wareing as Funeral Date
- Paddy Considine as Jack/PT Kommander
- Gemma Chan as Glamorous Judge
- Rade Šerbedžija as Frightening Old Man

== Production ==
In February 2012 it was reported that Richard Ayoade would direct The Double, starring Jesse Eisenberg and Mia Wasikowska, in the United Kingdom. Principal photography began on 20 May 2012 in London.

== Soundtrack ==
The score by Andrew Hewitt features a recurring progression of heavy chords played by strings. The chord progression comes from the song "Der Doppelgänger" by Franz Schubert.

== Release ==
The Double premiered at the Toronto International Film Festival on 7 September 2013. On 15 October 2013, it was announced that Magnolia Pictures had acquired the US rights for a 2014 release. The earliest general release occurred in the United Arab Emirates on 3 April 2014.

== Reception ==
=== Box office ===
The film opened in seventy one cinemas in the United Kingdom on 4 April 2014 to $467,074 on its first weekend, going on to gross $1,272,555 during its total run. The film opened in two cinemas in the United States, grossing $200,406 in North America. The international box office total came to $2,266,181.

=== Critical reception ===
The film received positive reviews from critics and has a rating of 83% on Rotten Tomatoes, based on 131 reviews, with an average rating of 6.9/10. The consensus states "Hauntingly bleak and thrillingly ambitious, The Double offers Jesse Eisenberg a pair of compelling roles while reaffirming writer-director Richard Ayoade's remarkable talent." The film also has a score of 68 out of 100 on Metacritic, based on 31 critics.

Jon Espino from TheYoungFolks.com gave the film nine out of ten, stating:

Writer/Director Richard Ayoade had really outdone himself. The way he re-imagined and modernized Fyodor Dostoevsky's novella The Double, is a pure artistic vision. The dark tones are only enhanced by the light notes of humor throughout the film. Ayoade's avant garde, experimental style and minimalist set design sound like an odd couple, but they actually work great together.

He also goes on to praise Eisenberg's performance, saying:

In his best work since The Social Network, Eisenberg portrays the polarized personalities of Simon and James with such ease. The story basically rests on his shoulders as we follow him on his descent into madness. In between the fast-paced dialogue and front-lit shots there is also a very complex story that leaves the ending open to interpretation.
