= Drag Me to Hell =

2009 film by Sam Raimi

- Theatrical release poster
- Directed by: Sam Raimi
- Written by: Sam Raimi; Ivan Raimi
- Produced by: Robert Tapert; Grant Curtis
- Starring: Alison Lohman; Justin Long; Lorna Raver; Dileep Rao; David Paymer; Adriana Barraza
- Cinematography: Peter Deming
- Edited by: Bob Murawski
- Music by: Christopher Young
- Production company: Ghost House Pictures
- Distributed by: Universal Pictures (North and Latin America, Germany, Austria, Switzerland and Spain); Mandate International (International)
- Release dates: March 15, 2009 (SXSW); May 29, 2009 (United States)
- Running time: 99 minutes
- Country: United States
- Languages: English; Spanish
- Budget: $30 million
- Box office: $90.8 million

Drag Me to Hell is a 2009 American supernatural horror film directed and co-written by Sam Raimi with Ivan Raimi, starring Alison Lohman, Justin Long, Lorna Raver, Dileep Rao, David Paymer, and Adriana Barraza. The story focuses on a loan officer who, in an effort to prove to her boss that she can make the "hard decisions" at work, chooses not to extend an elderly woman's mortgage. The old woman places a retaliatory curse on her that, after three days of escalating torment, will plunge her into the depths of Hell to burn for eternity.

Drag Me to Hell was developed by Sam and his brother, Ivan, who wrote the script for a film titled The Curse in the 1990s as a dark, cautionary fable. Conceived as a "cruel morality tale", the script was intentionally designed to punish a well-intentioned protagonist for making a single selfish mistake, capturing the visceral, slapstick-horror tone of Raimi’s earlier Evil Dead films. However, they shelved the project to focus on other films, eventually completing the script in 2007. Following the massive commercial success of his Spider-Man film trilogy (2002–2007), Sam Raimi wanted to return to his low-budget, independent horror roots. He partnered with Ghost House Pictures to produce the film independently from major studio constraints. It was shot in Tarzana, California in 2008 with a budget of $30 million.

Drag Me to Hell premiered at the SXSW on March 15, 2009, and was theatrically released in the United States on May 29, 2009, by Universal Pictures. The film received positive reviews from critics and grossed $90.8 million worldwide. It won the Saturn Award for Best Horror Film at the 36th Saturn Awards.

== Plot ==
In 1969 Pasadena, a Hispanic couple seek help from young medium Shaun San Dena, claiming their son Juan is hearing evil voices after having stolen a silver necklace from a Romani woman's wagon, despite his attempts to return it. San Dena prepares a séance, but an unseen force attacks them and drags Juan to Hell. San Dena vows to fight the demon again one day.

Forty years later, in present-day Los Angeles, bank loan officer Christine Brown vies for a promotion to assistant branch manager with her co-worker, Stu Rubin. Her boss, Jim Jacks, advises her to demonstrate tough decision-making. When Sylvia Ganush, an elderly and disheveled Romani woman, asks for a third extension on her mortgage due to economic problems resulting from an illness, Christine, against her better judgement, denies her request, and Sylvia desperately begs not to have her house repossessed. As security guards escort her out, she accuses Christine of publicly shaming her. Later, in the parking garage, Sylvia attacks her as she is leaving. After a struggle, Sylvia rips a button from Christine's coat and places a curse on it. After she returns it, she warns that Christine will soon come begging to her.

Christine and her boyfriend Clay Dalton, a college professor, visit fortune teller Rham Jas, who discovers an omen upon Christine and sends her on her way with a refund. The next morning, Christine visits Rham again and he explains that a dark spirit has latched onto her. At home, the entity tortures Christine; at work, she suffers a violent nosebleed while hallucinating about Sylvia. As she leaves, Stu covertly takes a file from her desk. Christine visits Sylvia's granddaughter Ilenka, intending to apologize to Sylvia, but Ilenka reveals Sylvia has recently died. She inadvertently embarrasses the attendees at her funeral, and Ilenka warns her that she deserves her eventual fate. Jas explains to Christine that she has been inflicted with the curse of the Lamia or "Black Goat", an ancient and powerful demon that torments its victims for three days before literally dragging them to Hell. Following his suggestion of an appeasatory sacrifice, Christine reluctantly kills her pet kitten before meeting Clay's wealthy parents Trudy and Leonard at their house for dinner, during which grotesque hallucinations torment her further.

Jas offers to introduce a furious Christine to San Dena for $10,000. Christine fails to raise the funds and her bank denies her the loan, but a sympathetic Clay pays on her behalf. Revealing that she has been awaiting vengeance against the Lamia, San Dena and her assistant prepare a séance, attempting to trap the spirit in a goat and kill the animal to destroy the demon, but the entity possesses her, the goat and her assistant, the last of whom vomits up the corpse of Christine's deceased cat. After successfully banishing the Lamia, she dies soon afterwards. Jas seals the button in an envelope and tells Christine that she can remove the curse by giving the button to someone else, thus transferring the curse to them.

At a 24-hour diner, Christine telephones Stu, accusing him of stealing her file and demanding he meet her there, intending to present the cursed button to him. When he arrives, he successfully implores her to pity him and abstain from notifying Jacks about his transgressions. Consulting Jas, Christine learns she can formally offer the curse to the deceased, so she exhumes Sylvia's corpse and forces the envelope into her mouth. A massive downpour nearly traps her in the grave, but she successfully manages to escape.

Returning home, she ventures to Union Station, where she buys a new coat and Clay intends to propose to her. Jacks also informs Christine that she has received the promotion, Stu having been dismissed for stealing her file. At the station, Clay presents her with an envelope he had discovered in his car which contains her cursed coat button; before exhuming Sylvia, she had mistaken it for a similar envelope containing a rare coin and had given to Clay earlier. Horrified, she stumbles backwards onto the tracks; as a train speeds towards her, a portal of demonic hands emerge from the ground and drag her into Hell below. A horrified Clay, having watched from above, holds the button.

== Cast ==
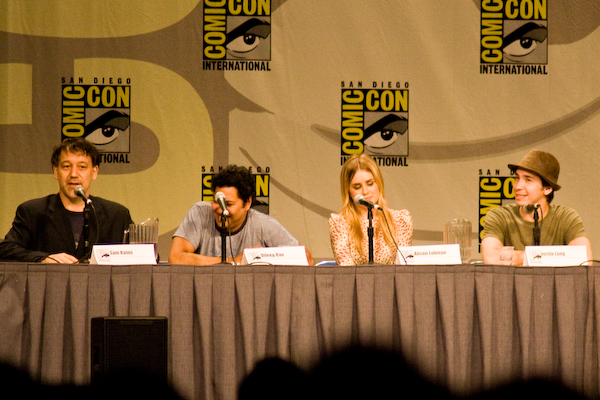
Director Sam Raimi and actors Dileep Rao, Alison Lohman, and Justin Long discussing the film at San Diego Comic-Con in 2008

- Alison Lohman as Christine Brown, a bank loan officer who is placed under the Lamia curse when up for a promotion to assistant bank manager.
- Justin Long as Professor Clayton "Clay" Dalton, a college professor and Christine’s boyfriend
- Lorna Raver as Mrs. Sylvia Ganush, an elderly Romani woman who places the Lamia curse on Christine in retaliation for not helping her pay her mortgage.
- Dileep Rao as Rham Jas, a fortune teller who discovers the affliction Christine was cursed with
- David Paymer as Mr. Jim Jacks
- Adriana Barraza as Shaun San Dena, a witch set on banishing the Lamia
- Bojana Novakovic as Ilenka Ganush, Sylvia's granddaughter
- Reggie Lee as Stu Rubin, Christine's co-worker and rival for a promotion position
- Chelcie Ross as Leonard Dalton
- Molly Cheek as Trudy Dalton
- Art Kimbro as the voice of Lamia, a powerful demonic being that torments its victims for three days before dragging them into Hell.
- Octavia Spencer as a bank co-worker
- Alex Veadov as the man with ponytail at the wake

The film includes cameo appearances by Raimi himself as an uncredited ghost at the séance, his younger brother Ted as a doctor, and his eldest children Emma, Henry, and Lorne in minor roles. Frequent Raimi collaborator Scott Spiegel appears as a mourner at the death feast, while fellow frequent Raimi collaborator John Paxton and Irene Roseen appear as the old couple at the diner.

== Themes and interpretations ==
Drag Me to Hell has been noted for its relevance to the subprime mortgage crisis and more broadly, the Great Recession, which were ongoing at the time of the film's release. Director Sam Raimi reportedly considered this a coincidence, stating, "We just wanted to tell the story of a person who wants to be a good person but who makes a sinful choice out of greed, for their own benefit, and pays the price for it."

Also shortly after the film's release, a fan theory garnered attention online, positing that Christine—who is depicted as having been overweight in her youth—is experiencing hallucinations as a result of an eating disorder rather than a supernatural curse, with her delusions repeatedly involving food or vomiting.

== Production ==
=== Background ===
The original story for Drag Me to Hell was written ten years before the film went into production and was written by Sam Raimi and his brother Ivan Raimi. The film went into production under the name The Curse. The Raimis wrote the script as a morality tale, desiring to write a story about a character who wants to be a good person, but makes a sinful choice out of greed for her own betterment and pays the price for it. The Raimis tried to make the character of Christine the main focal point in the film and tried to have Christine in almost all the scenes in the film. Elements of the film's story are drawn from the British horror film Night of the Demon such as the similar-shaped demons and the three-day curse theme in the film. The most significant parallel is that both stories involve the passing of a cursed object, which has to be passed to someone else, or its possessor will be devoured by one or more demons. Unlike his past horror films, Raimi wanted the film to be rated PG-13 and not strictly driven by gore, stating, "I didn't want to do exactly the same thing I had done before."

After finishing the script, Raimi desired to make the picture after the first draft of the script was completed, but other projects such as the Spider-Man film series became a nearly decade-long endeavor, pushing opportunities to continue work on Drag Me to Hell to late 2007. Raimi offered director Edgar Wright the opportunity to direct Drag Me to Hell which Wright turned down as he was filming Hot Fuzz and felt that "If I did it, it would just feel like karaoke." After the previous three Spider-Man films, Raimi came back to the script of Drag Me to Hell, wanting to make a simpler and lower-budget film. In 2007, Sam Raimi's friend and producer Robert Tapert of Ghost House Pictures had the company sign on to finance the film. Universal Studios agreed to distribute domestically.

=== Casting ===
After completing the script and having the project greenlit, Raimi started casting the film. Elliot Page was originally cast for the main role of Christine, but dropped out of the project due to SAG strike-related scheduling issues. The main role eventually went to Alison Lohman, who did not enjoy horror films, but enjoyed doing the stunts during filming. Stage actress Lorna Raver would audition for the role of Mrs. Ganush. Raver was not aware of the specific nature of her character until being cast, stating that all she had read was "about a little old lady coming into the bank because they're closing down her house. It was only later that I saw the whole script and said, 'Oh my!'". To prepare for this role, Raver met with a Hungarian dialect coach and asked to have portions of the script translated into Hungarian. Raimi would later ask Raver to use some of the Hungarian words in the scenes of Ganush's attacking Christine. Dileep Rao, who plays Rham Jas, made producer Grant Curtis mildly hesitant in casting him, stating that during his audition "he was a little bit younger than he read in the script. But as we were looking at his reading, Sam said, 'There's no minimum age requirement on wisdom.' Dileep has that wisdom and presence on screen, and that's what made him right. Once he got on camera, he brought that shoulder for Alison to lean on." Many of the actors playing secondary characters in Drag Me to Hell have appeared previously in Raimi's films, including Joanne Baron, Tom Carey, Molly Cheek, Aimee Miles, John Paxton, Ted Raimi, Bill E. Rogers, Chelcie Ross, and Octavia Spencer.

=== Filming ===
Raimi said he set out to create "a horror film with lots of wild moments and lots of suspense and big shocks that'll hopefully make audiences jump. But I also wanted to have a lot of dark humor sprinkled throughout. I spent the last decade doing Spider-Man and you come to rely on a lot of people doing things for you and a lot of help, but it's refreshing and wonderful to be reminded that, as with most filmmakers, the best way to do it is yourself, with a tight team doing the main jobs."

Production for Drag Me to Hell began on location in Tarzana, California. The production team included director of photography Peter Deming, production designer Steve Saklad and visual effects supervisor Bruce Jones. The film was produced by Grant Curtis and Rob Tapert. Tapert and Raimi are longtime collaborators, having attended college together in Michigan.

=== Editing ===
Drag Me to Hell was edited by Bob Murawski, who has collaborated with Raimi on several films including the Spider-Man series, The Gift, and Army of Darkness. Raimi has said of working with Murawski on Drag Me to Hell, "He'd come (down to the set) to see how things were going and to let me know if he'd just cut something that wasn't working the way he'd wanted it to, or to suggest a pick-up shot I should get for a piece he felt we needed in a sequence I hadn't realized I needed. He's very detail-oriented... So we're very close collaborators." Raimi finds editing with Murawski to be "relaxing", adding, "I love it. For me, it's so relaxing, unlike pre-production, which is fraught with anxiety and fear about how we're going to do things, and production, which is so rushed and a sleepless time and you're just racing to finish every shot and worrying about focus and so on. So post is soothing and I can watch the film come together, so it's a time of discovery for me as Bob and I fit all the pieces together. I see new possibilities in post, as Bob puts the film together, sometimes in a way I never imagined..." The film was edited by Murawski on an Avid computer system in a West Los Angeles facility. The color grading was completed at Company 3 with colorist Stephen Nakamura. Nakamura used DaVinci Resolve. It was CO3's first start-to-finish feature in 4K resolution. "For us, post is a very creative time where it's not just about this factory producing the blueprinted product. It's really a very creative, experimental time where we try and take everything that's been written and then shot to the next level," said Raimi. The final sound mix was completed at the Dub Stage in Burbank with mixers Marti Humphrey and Chris Jacobson.

=== Visual effects ===
The visual effects in Drag Me to Hell were created in many different ways, including greenscreen, puppets, prosthetics and CGI. Bruce Jones was the visual effects supervisor on the film. Of Jones, Raimi commented, "He brought a great can-do approach to the film... He's got a great team of artists and technicians with him, and he's got great instincts."

There were hundreds of visual effects in the film, and different effects houses were used. According to Raimi, the Bay Area's Tippett Studio was a big player. "We also had work done by Amalgamated Pixels, Ghost VFX, KNB Effects, Home Digital, Cinesoup and IE Effects," said Raimi. According to Raimi, "Bob (Murawski) and I kept adding visual effects as post proceeded. In this film, the supernatural, the unseen, is almost another character, so sequences were developed—even in post—that would suggest the presence of the supernatural, and we kept on adding. The same with the sound effects, so it was a very ongoing, very live process in post."

Director of photography Peter Deming tried to use realistic lighting in the film. Said Deming, "Normally, you'd put all corrected bulbs in, but we went with what was there, including the shots in the street. We used the streetlight look and mixed that with interior lighting. There were a lot of odd color sources that we chose to leave the way they would be naturally. It's a heightened sense of realism." One of the earliest projects the visual effects teams did was the scene in which Mrs. Ganush attacks Christine in her car. To film the action, which included close-ups of Christine jamming her foot on the pedal, hitting the brake, and shifting gears, the team created a puzzle car which allowed the front engine compartment and back trunk—as well as all four sides and doors—to come away from the car. The roof came off in two directions.

In 2024, The Independent reported that the maggots sprayed into Allison Lohman's mouth were live. However, the American Humane Society's page for the film states that the "[p]roduction provided documentation that the flies, worms and maggots [...] were all fake."

=== Soundtrack ===
The film score was composed by Christopher Young. Young has collaborated with director Raimi previously on his films The Gift and Spider-Man 3. The soundtrack was released on June 2, 2009, and later in a vinyl edition by Waxwork Records in 2018. Sam Raimi stated that emphasis was on using the soundtrack to create a world that didn't exist, a world of the "supernatural". The score contains elements of Young's previous work on Flowers in the Attic. This is particularly apparent in the utilization of the ethereal childlike soprano vocals that feature prominently throughout the soundtrack.

== Release ==
Drag Me to Hell was first shown to the public as a "Work in Progress" print at the South by Southwest festival on March 15, 2009. The film debuted in its full form at the 2009 Cannes Film Festival, where it was shown out of competition on May 20, 2009, as a midnight screening. It was released on May 29, 2009.

=== Home media ===
Drag Me to Hell was released on DVD and Blu-ray Disc in the US on October 13, 2009. For home video, an unrated edition was made available in addition to the theatrical version, the unrated version containing some additional moments of gory violence. In its first two weeks the DVD sold 459,217 copies generating $7.98 million in sales. It has since accumulated $13.9 million in DVD sales in the United States.

On February 13, 2018, Scream Factory released a two-disc Collector's Edition of Drag Me to Hell, which included both the theatrical and unrated versions of the film remastered from the 2K digital intermediate, archival interviews and featurettes and all-new interviews with Alison Lohman, Lorna Raver and Christopher Young. They would also later issue an Ultra HD Blu-ray edition on October 29, 2024, including all previous bonus features and a new director and editor-approved 4K remaster of both versions of the film, based on a scan of a preservation film negative.

== Reception ==
=== Box office ===
The film was released in the United States on May 29, 2009. The film opened at #4 with $15.8 million from 2,900 screens at 2,508 theaters, an average of $6,310 per theater ($5,457 average per screen). In its second weekend, it dropped 56%, falling to #7, with $7 million, for an average of $2,805 per theater ($2,514 average per screen), and bringing the 10-day gross to $28,233,230. Even though its two-week initial performance was described as "disappointing", Drag Me to Hell closed on August 6, 2009, with a final gross in the United States and Canada of $42.1 million, and an additional $48.7 million internationally for a total of $90.8 million worldwide.

=== Critical response ===
On Rotten Tomatoes, the film has an approval rating of 92% based on 270 reviews, and an average rating of 7.6/10. The site's critical consensus states, "Sam Raimi returns to top form with Drag Me to Hell, a frightening, hilarious, delightfully campy thrill ride." On Metacritic, the film has a weighted average score of 83 out of 100, based on 32 critics, indicating "universal acclaim". Audiences polled by CinemaScore gave the film an average grade of "B−" on an A+ to F scale.

Owen Gleiberman of Entertainment Weekly gave the film an "A" rating, stating that "Raimi has made the most crazy, fun, and terrifying horror movie in years." Betsy Sharkey of the Los Angeles Times praised the film, writing that it "should not be dismissed as yet another horror flick just for teens. The filmmakers have given us a 10-story winding staircase of psychological tension that is making very small circles near the end." Michael Phillips of the Chicago Tribune described the film as a "hellaciously effective B-movie [that] comes with a handy moral tucked inside its scares, laughs and Raimi's specialty, the scare/laugh hybrid." Roger Ebert of the Chicago Sun Times gave the film 3 out of 4 stars, and stated that the film "is a sometimes funny and often startling horror movie. That is what it wants to be, and that is what it is." In a positive review, Variety said of the film: "Scant and barren of subtext, the pic is single-mindedly devoted to pushing the audience's buttons... Still, there's no denying it delivers far more than competing PG-13 thrillers." Bloody Disgusting gave the film four and a half stars out of five, with the review calling it "quite simply the most perfect horror film I've seen in a long, long while... [It's] a blast and moved quickly from start to finish [and] is well on its way to becoming an immediate classic." The film was then ranked thirteenth in Bloody Disgusting's list of the 'Top 20 Horror Films of the Decade'.

Rex Reed of The New York Observer thought that the plot wasn't believable enough, and Peter Howell of The Toronto Star disliked Lohman's performance and thought the film was "just not very funny".

Some reviews considered the film a comedy horror in the style that Raimi is known for. The film "blends horror and humor so well that viewers don't know whether to laugh or scream", noted TV Guide, which also hailed it as "a popcorn film that aims to entertain—nothing more, nothing less—and it achieves that goal admirably. Few films, horror or otherwise, can boast such a claim, making Raimi's self-described 'spook-a-blast' an excellent example of a film where ambition and execution come together in perfect harmony." Vic Holtreman of Screen Rant stated that the film blends comedy and horror in a similar fashion to the way Army of Darkness does. According to a reviewer at UGO Networks, the film is primarily a comedy rather than a horror, and this is consistent with Raimi's directing style, which has not included any "true horror" films.

== Accolades ==
The film was nominated for "Choice Movie: Horror/Thriller" at the 2009 Teen Choice Awards, which the film lost to Friday the 13th (2009). At the 2009 Scream Awards show, Drag Me to Hell won the awards for Best Horror Movie and Best Scream-play. The film also won Best Horror Film at the Saturn Awards.

At the 17th Fangoria Chainsaw Awards, the film was nominated for Best Wide Release, Best Supporting Actress (Lorna Raver), and Best Score, winning all three.

== Potential sequel ==
In March 2023, Raimi revealed that Ghost House Pictures was actively trying to come up with ideas for a potential sequel for the film.

== See also ==
- Hellbound, a 2021 South Korean TV series with a similar plot
- Inferno, a 2016 film with a similar theme
- Night of the Demon, a 1957 film with a similar plot
