= Maria Pasquinelli =

Italian teacher and murderer (1913–2013)

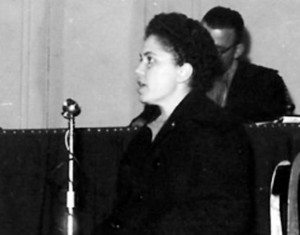
- Born: 16 March 1913; Florence, Italy
- Died: 3 July 2013 (aged 100); Bergamo, Italy
- Citizenship: Italy
- Occupation: Teacher
- Known for: Killing Robert de Winton
- Status: Deceased
- Motive: Anger over Istrian–Dalmatian exodus
- Conviction: Murder
- Penalty: Death; commuted to life imprisonment

Details
- Victims: Robert de Winton, 38
- Date: 10 February 1947

Maria Pasquinelli (16 March 1913 – 3 July 2013) was an Italian teacher and member of the Fascist party convicted for the killing of British Brigadier Robert de Winton in Pola on 10 February 1947. She carried out the assassination in protest of the Istrian–Dalmatian exodus.

== Biography ==
Maria Pasquinelli was born in Florence, Italy on 16 March 1913. As a teenager, she was a member of the Italian Fascist Party. She served as a nurse in Libya during World War II. In 1942 Pasquinelli went to work as an Italian teacher in Split, Croatia, where she denounced the killings of Italian civilians in Dalmatia and Istria that occurred between 1943 and 1945, most of them perpetrated by Yugoslav partisans. The attempts of Pasquinelli to rouse the Italian population led to her arrest by German occupation troops. In early 1945 she tried unsuccessfully to unite all the Italians of Istria – both fascist soldiers, as well as Catholic and Communist partisans – against the annexation of Istria by the Yugoslavians under the leadership of Josip Broz Tito.

=== Killing of Brigadier Robert de Winton ===
On 10 February 1947, in protest against the Istrian–Dalmatian exodus, Pasquinelli went to the Istrian city of Pola, where she shot and killed the commander of the British garrison in the area, Brigadier Robert de Winton. The Brigadier was in the process of reviewing his troops when he was hit by three shots in the back that killed him instantly. One British soldier was wounded by a stray bullet. As Allied supreme commander in Istria, de Winton was about to transfer power to Yugoslav authorities.

Pasquinelli was sentenced to death by a British military court at Trieste in 1947. However, her life was spared and she was handed over to the new Italian republican government, on the promise that she would serve life imprisonment. She was in jail for 17 years following the assassination, and upon her release by presidential pardon in 1964. Pasquinelli lived in Bergamo, where she remained until her death at age 100.

== See also ==
- Norma Cossetto
- Istrian–Dalmatian exodus

== Bibliography ==
- Petacco, Arrigo. L'Esodo, La tragedia negata degli italiani d'Istria, Dalmazia e Venezia Giulia. Mondadori Editore. Milano, 1999
- Zecchi, Stefano. Maria. Una storia italiana d'altri tempi. Vertigo editoriale. Trieste, 2004.
