= Cochochi =

- Directed by: Laura Amelia Guzmán; Israel Cárdenas
- Screenplay by: Israel Cardenas; Laura Amelia Guzman
- Produced by: Pablo Cruz; Donald Ranvaud
- Starring: Antonio Lerma Batista; Evaristo Lerma Batista
- Cinematography: Israel Cardenas; Laura Amelia Guzman
- Edited by: Israel Cardenas; Laura Amelia Guzman; Yibran Asuad
- Music by: Israel Cardenas
- Production companies: Alcove Entertainment; Canana Films; Buena Onda Americas
- Release date: September 3, 2007 (Venice)
- Running time: 97 minutes
- Country: Mexico
- Language: Rarámuri

Cochochi is a Mexican drama film, directed by Laura Amelia Guzmán and Israel Cárdenas and released in 2007. Set among the Rarámuri people of northwest Mexico, the film stars Antonio Lerma Batista and Evaristo Lerma Batista as two young brothers who are sent by their grandfather to bring medicine to a relative in another town, but get lost after taking a wrong turn en route; they then lose the horse they are riding and themselves become separated, and must figure out how to reunite and get back to safety.

== Distribution ==
The film premiered on September 3, 2007, in the Orizzonti program at the 64th Venice International Film Festival.

== Critical response ==
Alissa Simon of Variety called it an attenuated and simplistic tale that "has a stiff, stagy feel, its energy level further sapped by amateur thesps who frequently seem uncomfortable in front of the camera."

David Wiegand of SFGate wrote that the film resembled something that Damon Runyon might have written if his typical subject matter had been Mexican rather than New York City culture.

Carlos Bonfil of Ibermedia Digital referred to it as "a story of extreme simplicity, as minimalist and suggestive as the lyrical-didactic films of the Iranian Abbas Kiarostami”.

== Awards ==
At the 2007 Toronto International Film Festival, the film won the Discovery Award.

It received two Ariel Award nominations, for Best Original Screenplay and Best First Work, in 2008.
