= Red Land =

- Directed by: Maximiliano Hernando Bruno
- Written by: Antonello Belluco; Maximiliano Hernando Bruno
- Produced by: Maximiliano Hernando Bruno; Alessandro Centenaro
- Starring: Geraldine Chaplin; Franco Nero; Antonio Scarpa; Maximiliano Hernando Bruno; Sandra Ceccarelli; Francesca Amodio
- Cinematography: Giovanni Andreotta
- Edited by: Marco Spoletini; Francesco Tasselli
- Music by: Michele Bettali; Stefano Carrara; Fabrizio Castania
- Release date: 15 November 2018
- Running time: 150 minutes
- Country: Italy
- Language: Italian

Red Land (Italian: Rosso Istria) is a 2018 film directed, written, and produced by Maximiliano Hernando Bruno. Released in Italy on November 15, 2018, the film focuses on World War II in Istria following September 8, 1943—immediately after Italy signed the separate armistice with the Anglo-American Allies—and on the life of Norma Cossetto, a young Istrian student who was killed by Yugoslav partisans in October 1943 at the age of 23.

== Plot ==
On July 25, 1943, Benito Mussolini is arrested, and on September 8, the Armistice of Cassibile (signed on September 3) was announced, plunging the situation into chaos. The Royal Italian Army no longer knew who was an enemy and who an ally, leaving soldiers to fend for themselves across various theaters of war. Civilian populations in Istria, Fiume, Venezia Giulia, and Dalmatia faced a fraught relationship with the Yugoslav partisans (led by Josip Broz Tito), who were advancing through the region while fighting against Nazi-Fascist forces.

Against this dramatic historical backdrop, the film highlights the story of Norma Cossetto, a young Istrian student nearing graduation at the University of Padua. She was arrested and killed—after suffering abuse at the hands of the partisans—due to her father's role as a local official in the Fascist Party. In 2005, Norma Cossetto was posthumously awarded the gold medal for Civil Valor by the President of the Republic, Carlo Azeglio Ciampi.

== Cast ==
- Geraldine Chaplin as Giulia Visantrin
- Franco Nero as Professor Ambrosin
- Antonio Scarpa as Titino
- Maximiliano Hernando Bruno as Giorgio Staniscia
- Sandra Ceccarelli as Mother Visantrin
- Francesca Amodio as Lucia Visantrin
- Selene Gandini as Norma Cossetto

== Production ==
Maximiliano Hernando Bruno's screenplay is based on a "diary" written by Norma Cossetto's cousin, Giuseppe (1920–2017); he wrote it at his daughter's urging the year before his death, at the age of 96. The film was announced in 2015, initially with Antonello Belluco as director (he later became the producer); filming began in Trieste in November 2015, followed by shooting in Padua in early April 2016. Filming concluded in the Veneto region in early September 2017, including at Castello Papadopoli Giol in San Polo di Piave (Treviso).

The film was partially funded by the Lazio Region.

== Distribution ==
A press conference and a private screening of the film were held on September 7, 2018, during the 75th Venice International Film Festival. On November 6, 2018, the film was presented in the Caduti di Nassiriya Hall of the Senate. The official premiere took place in Rome that same day, followed by a release in select Italian cinemas on November 15.

On January 14, 2019, the Unione Italiana acquired the rights for distribution in Slovenia and Croatia later that year; the first screenings took place on February 22 and 23 at the Oden Cinema in Izola (Isola d'Istria), in the Slovenian part of Istria.

To mark the Day of Remembrance (Giorno del Ricordo), the film was broadcast on Rai Tre on February 8, 2019, drawing an audience of 871,000 viewers, representing a 3.7% audience share.

== Reception ==
=== Box Office ===
In Italy, the film grossed €56,600 during its opening weekend and a total of €183,000 over a fourteen-week theatrical run.

=== Critical reception ===
Mymovies awarded the film 3.5 out of 5 stars, writing that: "Maximiliano Hernando Bruno largely succeeded in finding the right approach to tell the story of those days and events—that is, to fulfill one of cinema's many roles: preserving memory. We say 'largely' because there are some melodramatic flourishes (the Titoist leader is portrayed as absolute evil, while the Italian communist is depicted as a traitor to his own people—partly due to romantic resentment—yet offered a chance at final redemption, much like in opera). Overall, however, the screenplay strikes a balanced tone in portraying both the sense of bewilderment following September 8th and the inner motivations of the various parties involved. General Esposito voices the Army's deep misgivings regarding a misguided war instigated by Fascism, while the regime's years-long policy of forced Italianization in the region is not glossed over."

In Croatia, the film received a positive reception from the Istrian daily newspaper La Voce.

=== Remarks from political figures ===
The Fratelli d'Italia party immediately pledged its support for increasing screenings and showing the film in schools as well. Matteo Salvini—former Deputy Prime Minister and Minister of the Interior, representing the Lega Nord—spoke of a boycott against the film; he lashed out at "left-wing politicians and intellectuals who did everything to hide the truth [about the Foibe massacres]" and urged people to go see the film. Mattia Mor, a Democratic Party MP at the time, praised the film, describing it as harrowing yet necessary.

Conversely, far-left essayist and historian Alessandra Kersevan—who has frequently faced criticism for positions deemed revisionist by some—described it as "a film of pure fascist propaganda". Meanwhile, activists from the Pordenone branch of the Communist Party distributed leaflets at the entrance of a cinema showing the film; these flyers highlighted Norma Cossetto's adherenceq to Fascism and the reprisals carried out by the Nazis in response to her death. Historian Eric Gobetti—labeled "pro-Tito" by some right-wing outlets and criticized by many right-wing figures for arguments deemed apologetic—harshly criticized the film, writing that it is not "merely an implausible and brutal movie: it is an out-and-out piece of propaganda." Gobetti drew an unfavorable comparison between Red Land and the 2005 television miniseries Il cuore nel pozzo, writing that in Red Land "certain clichés are strikingly similar to those in the earlier film: the Yugoslav communist partisans (the 'Titoists') are bloodthirsty beasts driven by innate sadism; they possess no humanity, and there is no logic to their behavior—only a primal instinct driving them to violence. The few Italians who side with the Resistance are portrayed as naive individuals blinded by ignorance, ideology, stupidity, or terror". However, Gobetti continues, whereas Il cuore nel pozzo "presented a scenario of 'Slav-communist' violence striking an entire people—simply because they were Italian—suddenly and without provocation," in Red Land "the violence targets not Italians in general, but avowed Fascists. Thus, in the 2019 film, the victims, the heroes, and the characters with whom the viewer is encouraged to identify are no longer ordinary Italians, as they were in 2005: they are Fascists." According to Gobetti, Red Land makes "a very clear ideological choice," in which "Fascism and Communism are not equated, because the latter is portrayed as far worse than the former." In conclusion, Gobetti questions how it is possible that "the Italian State, through its public broadcaster, helped produce this film." It is the first Italian film since 1942 to portray Nazi troops as liberators and restorers of civil order (specifically in the town of Visinada, in Istria) during the Second World War and the early stages of the War of Liberation in Italy.

To mark the 2021 Day of Remembrance, the municipality of Merano screened the film on its website.
