= Sand Dollars (film) =

2014 film

- Film poster
- Directed by: Laura Amelia Guzmán; Israel Cárdenas
- Written by: Laura Amelia Guzmán; Israel Cárdenas
- Based on: Les Dollars des sables by Jean-Noël Pancrazi
- Starring: Geraldine Chaplin
- Production companies: Aurora Dominicana; Canana; Rei Cine
- Distributed by: FiGa
- Release date: 7 September 2014 (TIFF)
- Running time: 80 minutes
- Countries: Dominican Republic; Argentina; Mexico
- Language: Spanish

Sand Dollars (Spanish: Dólares de arena) is a 2014 internationally co-produced drama film directed by Laura Amelia Guzmán and Israel Cárdenas. It was screened in the Contemporary World Cinema section at the 2014 Toronto International Film Festival. It was selected as the Dominican entry for the Best Foreign Language Film at the 88th Academy Awards. In 2016, director Laura Amelia Guzmán announced she was working on a sequel called Noelí Overseas.

== Historical Background ==
Set in the Dominican Republic, Sand Dollars (Spanish: Dólares de arena) exposes the harsh realities of tourism in the Caribbean, with specific attention to the rise of sex tourism and its connections to global economic inequality. Tourism in the Dominican Republic has functioned as a continuation of colonial relationships, where instead of an exchange of labor and land, there is a circulation of bodies. In this way, tourism is understood not only as an economic activity, but a form of neocolonial exchange that is shaped by disparities between tourists and locals.

The cultural concept of transactional intimacy is central to understanding the relationship of Anne and Noelí. Rather than their relationship existing as purely romantic or economic, it exists in a space where affection, dependency, and financial exchange intersect. This reflects broader structures of inequality in the Caribbean, where race, class, gender, and nationality influence who has power and who is left vulnerable.

The film also engages with cultural aspects like dance, particularly the bachata, as a historically embedded form of communication. Rather than serving as a form of mindless entertainment, dance is used as a symbol of language through which intimacy and power are expressed. Key scenes involves bachata reflect deeper cultural histories tied to tourism, power, class, social standing, and identity in the Dominican Republic.

Together, these elements situate Sand Dollars within a context of neocolonial economic, where tourism, particularly sex tourism, reshapes hierarchies into new forms of economic and emotional exchange.

== Plot ==
Noelí is a young Dominican woman working as an escort for tourists. She has a three-year relationship with Anne (Geraldine Chaplin) a much older French woman who buys her services. Despite their transactional relationship, Anne is in love with Noelí and Noelí plans to use her to get a visa to go to France then Barcelona to reconnect with her mother who has moved there.

While out with Anne, Noelí sees her boyfriend with another girl at a club. She angrily confronts him while Anne is in the washroom, but Anne sees the tail end of their fight. Anne leaves the club and Noeli tries to stop her from leaving. When it becomes clear that all Noelí wants is for Anne to pay their bar tab, Anne slaps her and leaves. On her way home, Noelí crashes her motorcycle, which is stolen as she lies injured beside the road.

Anne struggles for a few days as she does not hear from Noelí and thinks she has abandoned her. Noeli meanwhile does not want to go back to Anne and tells her boyfriend to start providing for them. As money runs out she returns to Anne and tells her she is pregnant. Anne accompanies her to get an ultrasound to see if her unborn child is hurt and together they see the sonogram. After their reunion Anne presents Noelí with a passport and visa so that they can go to France together. She confesses to a friend that she does not believe that Noelí will be happy in Paris and they will be able to return to the Dominican Republic soon.

Noeli's boyfriend learns she is pregnant and plans to have the child overseas. He asks her to stay and she declines, going ahead with the preparations to leave with Anne.

The night of her departure Noelí's boyfriend comes to visit her. Noelí opens a drawer in the nightstand and takes her passport; she then steals money and Anne's credit cards. She and her boyfriend drive away and she tells him she loves him.

== Cast ==
- Geraldine Chaplin
- Yanet Mojica
- Ricardo Ariel Toribio

== Development ==
Directors Guzmán and Cárdenas based their script on the novel Sand Dollars by Jean-Noel Pancrazi. The original script, like the novel, was about two men, but the directors rewrote the script to feature two women after Geraldine Chaplin expressed interest in appearing in the film.

Yanet Mojica had never acted previously to appearing in the film but was selected based on the close resemblance of her life to that of the character she portrayed.

== Reception ==
Sand Dollars (Spanish: Dólares de arena) received positive critical reception, with praise for the actors' performances and portrayal of relationships shaped by race, status, power, and inequality. Critics highlight the film's tone and refusal to exploit the morality of its characters.

In a review for Variety Magazine, the film was described as "sensitive" and "nonjudgemental portrait" of a relationship shaped by inequality, with attention given to Geraldine Chaplin's performance; noted for its emotional depth.

Similarly, Screen Daily called the film "delicate" and "honest" in regards to its depiction of a complex relationship plagued by distinctive inequalities. Critics noted the documentary-style of the film, stating it allows the emotional dynamics of the characters to unfold over time, which is noted to make the film feel more realistic.

Across the board, the film is recognized for its exploration of power imbalances while also maintaining a tone that resists sensationalizing the relationship of Anne and Noelí. Its minimalism and documentary-style cinematography allowed for focus on a narrative driven primarily by character relationships and development, which were cited by critics as the films greatest strengths.

== See also ==
- List of submissions to the 88th Academy Awards for Best Foreign Language Film
- List of Dominican submissions for the Academy Award for Best Foreign Language Film
