= The River King =

- Directed by: Nick Willing
- Written by: Novel; Alice Hoffman; Screenplay; David Kane
- Produced by: Michele Camarda; Michael Cowan; Jason Piette; Marion Pilowsky; Christopher Zimmer
- Starring: Edward Burns; Rachelle Lefèvre; Jennifer Ehle
- Cinematography: Paul Sarossy
- Edited by: Jon Gregory
- Music by: Simon Boswell
- Distributed by: Kismet Film Company
- Release date: October 21, 2005
- Running time: 99 minutes
- Countries: Canada; United Kingdom
- Language: English

The River King is a 2005 film directed by Nick Willing and starring Edward Burns, Rachelle Lefèvre and Jennifer Ehle as a policeman, student and teacher all searching for the truth behind the apparent suicide of a young man at a small private school.

The film is based on the 2000 novel of the same name, by Alice Hoffman.

== Plot ==
Two young boys discover the body of Gus Pierce, a seventeen-year-old student at the prestigious Haddan School, in a frozen river. Local policemen Abel Grey and his partner retrieve the body and begin investigating at the school. The principal describes Gus as a loner, often depressed and alienated, and states it is a suicide; he is upset when the officers do not agree. Abel asks the school's photography teacher, Betsy, to take pictures of Gus' room and she insists on developing them herself. She also reveals that she had seen Gus the night before arguing with his friend Carlin, who had been crying in Gus' room when the police arrived. She cautions Abel to be kind to Carlin, saying she's not as tough as she seems. On his way out of the dorm Abel seems to hear a noise which he follows to the lavatory but finds nothing.

When Gus' father arrives, Abel is assigned to take him to a hotel, but instead brings him to see his son first. Carlin comes to the hotel and insists to Gus' father that Gus did not kill himself. Abel picks up Carlin on her way out of the hotel and she tells him that Gus' accident was her fault, but that he couldn't have killed himself because he would have left her a note. Later Carlin reveals more about the cruelty of Harry and his clique of friends, and that she couldn't bear it if she thought Gus killed himself. Abel tries to persuade his superior to investigate further but everyone else believes it was suicide.

Except Betsy, who delivers the photographs to Abel and shows him a shadowy figure standing next to Gus' bed in one image, saying it gives her the creeps. Abel then asks Betsy out to dinner, but she explains that she is getting married, and he tells her to let him to know if she thinks of anything else. Abel continues to find little clues to the events leading up to Gus' death, and learns that the department withheld evidence from the reports that Gus had human excrement in his lungs, which did not come from the river water. After another argument with his supervisor his partner brings him to a party at the Haddan School, where the headmaster gives the partner a payoff that regularly keeps the department from investigating the students. Abel rejects the bribe and walks home in a fury.

Betsy follows Abel home from the party and shows him more photographs, with dark shadows next to Harry – Carlin's boyfriend and Gus' tormentor in Chalk House, the most exclusive dorm on campus. Abel asks why she couldn't wait until the morning to bring the pictures; she replies that she couldn't wait, and the two go to bed together. Betsy leaves in the morning.

Abel is also forced to face facts from his past, and the strain of his relationship with his father, as the sights and sounds he encounters in the investigation trigger memories of his big brother Frank's suicide. Eventually he discovers that Gus was bullied and hazed by Harry and the other Chalk House boys involved in a secret society, while the teacher supervising the dorm, Betsy's fiancé, turned a blind eye. Betsy meets Abel to tell him she can't lie to her fiancé and breaks off their relationship. Carlin breaks up with Harry as her grief intensifies, and she isolates herself from family staying at school over the holiday break. It seems they are all haunted by Gus' death.

Abel's frustration leads him to pressure a young boy from the dorm whom he suspects witnessed Gus being assaulted in the lavatory by Harry and his friends. After the boy is assaulted by Harry and his friends (it is implied by the assaults occurring in the bathroom and the human excrement in Gus' lungs that Harry and his clique have been giving boys "chocolate swirlies," where a person's head is forced into a toilet bowl filled with feces and the toilet is then flushed), Abel accosts Harry. Harry is removed from the Haddan School and Abel turns in his badge and gun.

Sometime later, Abel visits Gus' father, who reveals that Gus did leave a suicide note in the magic box that Carlin was trying to open the day they arrived at the dorm. After he learns Gus chose to take his own life, Abel talks to his own father about Frank's death and begins to come to terms with his survivors guilt. Abel chooses to keep Gus' choice a secret, burning the suicide note, because he doesn't want to hurt Carlin. When Abel runs into the still engaged Betsy at another party in the spring, he walks away. She comes to him and smiles, and they kiss.

Carlin is seen swimming in the river, under a sunny sky.

== Cast ==
- Edward Burns as Abel Grey
- Jennifer Ehle as Betsy Chase
- John Kapelos as Joey Tosh
- Rachelle Lefevre as Carlin
- Jamie King as Harry McKenna
- Sean McCann as Ernest Grey
- Karl Pruner as Walter Pierce
- Julian Rhind-Tutt as Eric Herman
- Jonathan Malen as Nathaniel Glass
- Thomas Gibson as Gus Pierce
