= Laura Amelia Guzmán and Israel Cárdenas =

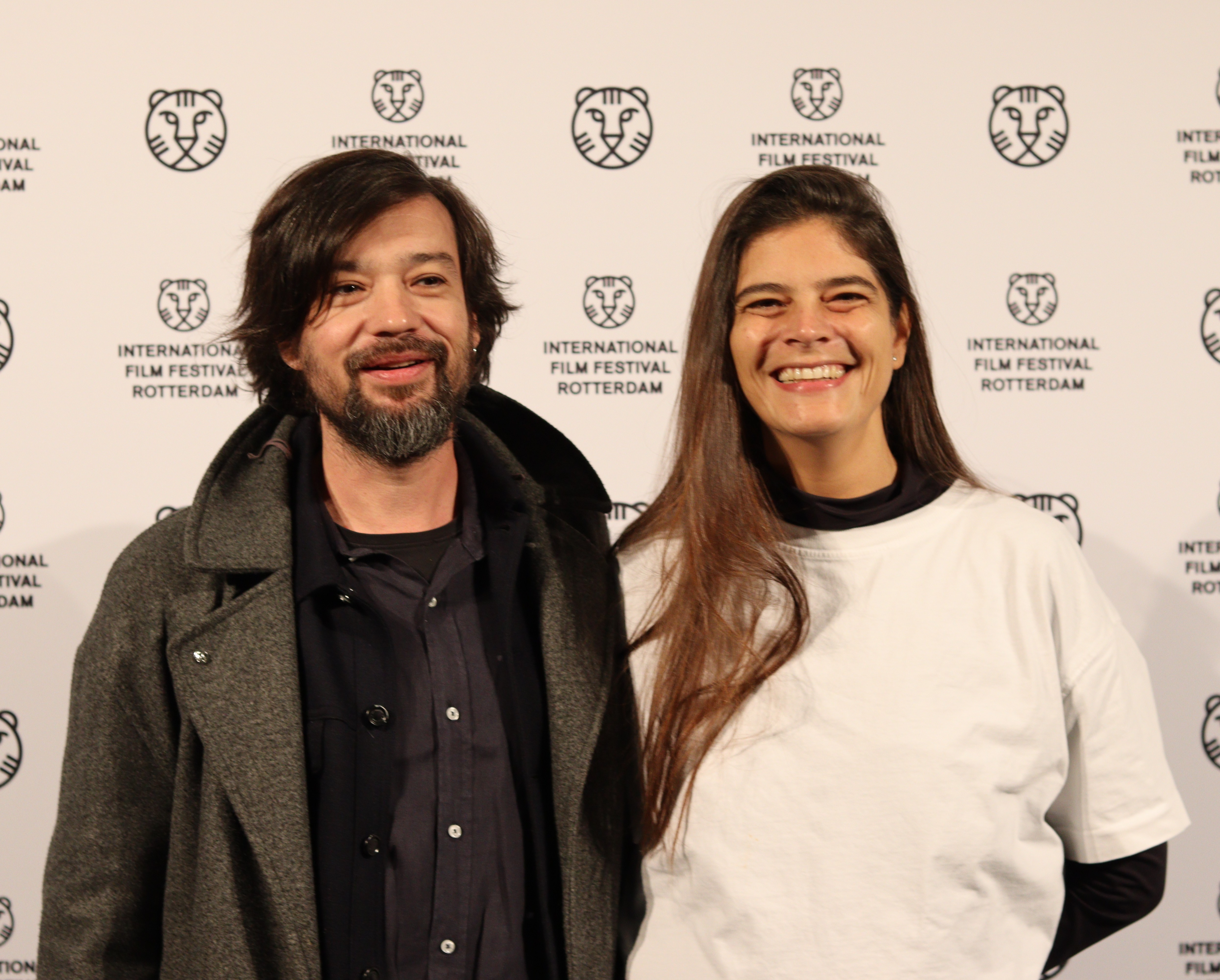
Israel Cárdenas and Laura Amelia Guzmán at the IFFR 2023 to promote their movie Babygirl

Laura Amelia Guzmán (born May 7, 1980) and Israel Cárdenas (born February 15, 1980) are a husband and wife directorial team.

== Early life ==
Guzmán was born in the Dominican Republic to parents who worked as art directors. She initially worked as a cinematographer before turning to directing.

Cárdenas was born and raised in Mexico.

== Filmmaking career ==
Since 2007, Laura Amelia Guzmán and Israel Cárdenas have run the production company Aurora Dominicana based in Santo Domingo, Dominican Republic.

Guzmán and Cárdenas began their directing and producing career in 2007 with their movie Cochochi.

In 2010 they co-directed the movie Jean Gentil which caught the attention of actress Geraldine Chaplin. They produced the film with their company Aurora Dominicana.

In 2013, they expanded to create a post-production studio also based in the Dominican Republic called Aurora Color Post.

After hearing Chaplin's warm praise of their film they decided to offer her a role in their next film Sand Dollars, also produced by their company. After Chaplin agreed to appear in a small role the couple decided to rewrite the male main characters to be women in order to give Chaplin a larger role. The film was chosen as the Dominican Republic's submission for the Academy Award for Best Foreign Language Film in 2015 but did not make the shortlist.

In 2016 Guzmán announced she was directing a sequel to Sand Dollars called Noeli Overseas. The final film premiered in the Dominican Republic in 2018 and was credited to both Guzmán and Cárdenas.

Their film Holy Beasts premiered at the 69th Berlin International Film Festival. The film starred Geraldine Chaplin and Udo Kier as fictional friends assembling to film the lost screenplay of real-life Dominican screenwriter Jean-Louis Jorge who was murdered in 2000.

== Filmography ==
- Cochochi (2007)
- Jean Gentil (2010)
- Sand Dollars (2014)
- Noeli Overseas (2016) (Guzmán only)
- Golden Boys (2016)
- Holy Beasts (2019)
