= Gentille Alouette =

- Directed by: Sergio Castilla
- Written by: Sergio Castilla
- Starring: Héctor Alterio; Geraldine Chaplin; John Leguizamo
- Release date: 1990
- Countries: France; Chile
- Language: Spanish

Gentille Alouette is a 1990 French-Chilean film written and directed by Sergio Castillo. Geraldine Chaplin stars as an actress in Paris that is stalked by a Latin American colonel played by Héctor Alterio.

== Plot ==
The Colonel (Alterio) begins to stalk his former lover, Angela (Chaplin), as he suspects her of being involved in an anti-government group. Surrealist elements come into play as the Colonel blends his memories of Angela with his suspicions to create fantastical scenarios of capturing the elusive actress.

== Cast ==
- Héctor Alterio as the Colonel
- Geraldine Chaplin as Angela Duverger
- John Leguizamo as Ortiz

== Reception ==
The New York Times described the film as "intriguing", and that Castilla "combines surrealism and high comedy in a visionary style that with its echoes of Gabriel García Márquez and Luis Buñuel seems quintessentially Latin American in spirit."
