= The Caller (2011 film) =

2011 film directed by Matthew Parkhill

- Theatrical Poster
- Directed by: Matthew Parkhill
- Written by: Sergio Casci
- Produced by: Amina Dasmal; Robin C. Fox; Piers Tempest; Luillo Ruiz
- Starring: Rachelle Lefevre; Lorna Raver; Stephen Moyer; Gladys Rodríguez; Luis Guzmán; Ed Quinn; Alfredo De Quesada
- Production companies: The Pimienta Film Company; The Salt Company; Alcove Entertainment
- Distributed by: Bankside Films (United States); Universal Pictures (United Kingdom)
- Release dates: April 15, 2011 (Gulf Film Festival); August 26, 2011 (United States); September 1, 2011 (Puerto Rico)
- Running time: 92 minutes
- Country: United Kingdom
- Language: English

The Caller is a 2011 British supernatural horror film directed by Matthew Parkhill and written by Sergio Casci, starring Rachelle Lefevre, Stephen Moyer and Lorna Raver. The movie was filmed entirely in Puerto Rico. The Gala Premiere of the movie was on August 23, 2011 at Metro Cinema in Puerto Rico.

== Plot ==
Mary Kee (Rachelle Lefevre), recently divorced, moves into a new apartment to get away from her abusive ex-husband and quickly befriends her neighbor George (Luis Guzmán). Soon, she starts receiving strange calls on a rotary phone from Rose (Lorna Raver), who claims to be calling from 1979 in search of her boyfriend, Bobby. Rose tries to prove her story with bizarre occurrences in the apartment, including a drawn rose and the sudden appearance of a brick wall.

Despite her doubts, Mary begins to sympathize with Rose and urges her to let Bobby go. When George reveals that Rose hanged herself in the apartment decades ago, the calls take a darker turn, and Mary notices other unsettling anomalies, including a mysterious woman appearing in old family photos.

Mary forms a friendship with John Guidi (Stephen Moyer), a professor who initially suspects her ex-husband is behind the strange events. But when Mary discovers that John disappeared in 1979, she uncovers the bodies of Bobby, George, and a young John hidden behind the brick wall. Rose continues to manipulate Mary through time, even using a younger version of her to torment her, but Mary ultimately outsmarts Rose, who vanishes—implying past Mary caused her death. The film ends with Mary confronting her ex-husband and restoring the brick wall, bringing a sense of closure.

== Cast ==
- Rachelle Lefevre as Mary Kee
- Stephen Moyer as John Guidi
- Gladys Rodríguez as Mrs. Guidi
- Lorna Raver as Rose
- Luis Guzmán as George
- Ed Quinn as Steven
- Marisé Alvarez as Nurse
- Alfredo De Quesada as Attorney Davies
- Cordelia González as Judge
- Aris Mejias as Young Woman
- Brian Tester as Attorney Kirkby
- Grace Connelly as Dr. Hain
- Abimael Linares as Young Man
- Wilfred Perez as Young Guy
- David Lee Rittenhouse as a real estate guy

== Production ==
Brittany Murphy was originally cast as Mary Kee, but left the production and was replaced by Rachelle Lefevre.

== Remake ==
The film was remade into the 2020 South Korean film The Call.

== Awards ==
Award	Year	Category	Nominee	Result	Ref
Neuchâtel International Fantastic Film Festival	2011	Narcisse Award for Best Feature Film	Matthew Parkhill	Nominated	
