= Lorna Raver =

American actress (1943–2025)

- Born: October 9, 1943; York, Pennsylvania, U.S.
- Died: May 12, 2025 (aged 81)
- Other name: Lorna Raver Johnson
- Occupation: Actor
- Years active: 1989–2014
- Partner: Yuri Rasovsky (m. 1987; died 2012)

Lorna Raver (October 9, 1943 – May 12, 2025) was an American actress who appeared in numerous plays, television series and films, such as the two horror movies The Caller and Drag Me to Hell. She was sometimes credited as Lorna Raver Johnson.

== Life and career ==
Raver was born in York, Pennsylvania, and was raised in a Pennsylvania Dutch environment. She had early experience performing at the Hedgerow Theater in Pennsylvania. She moved to New York City, appearing off-Broadway in the premieres of Last Days at the Dixie Girl Cafe and Between Daylight and Boonville. She then spent several years as a stage actress in the Chicago area before moving to Los Angeles, where she had many guest roles on TV and continued to work in live theater. Some of her performances included The Seagull, Spinning into Butter, The Women, The American Plan, Oedipus Rex, and The Drama Coach, for which she won the Drama-Logue and LA Weekly awards. She also performs in radio drama.

On September 19, 2006, she began appearing as Rebecca Kaplan on CBS's The Young and the Restless. She won critical acclaim as Mrs. Ganush in Sam Raimi's Drag Me to Hell (2009). In addition to numerous other stage and television appearances, she is a notable audiobook narrator for Tantor, Books on Tape, and Blackstone Audio. Raver retired from acting in 2014.

Raver died on May 12, 2025, aged 81.

== Filmography ==
=== Film ===
Year	Film	Role	Notes
1996	Freeway	Judge	Debut in film
2003	First Watch	Vice President	
2005	Candor City Hospital		Short film
2009	Drag Me to Hell	Mrs. Sylvia Ganush	Main role
2009	Armored	Child Welfare Agent	
2009	Bones	Professor Marlene Twardosh	Episode: "The Beaver in the Otter"
2011	The Caller	Rose	
2011	Breaking Waves	Mrs. Conwell	
2012	Sinbad: The Fifth Voyage	Zoreh	
2012	Rushlights	Belle Brogden	
