= The Double (Dostoevsky novel) =

1846 novel by Fyodor Dostoevsky

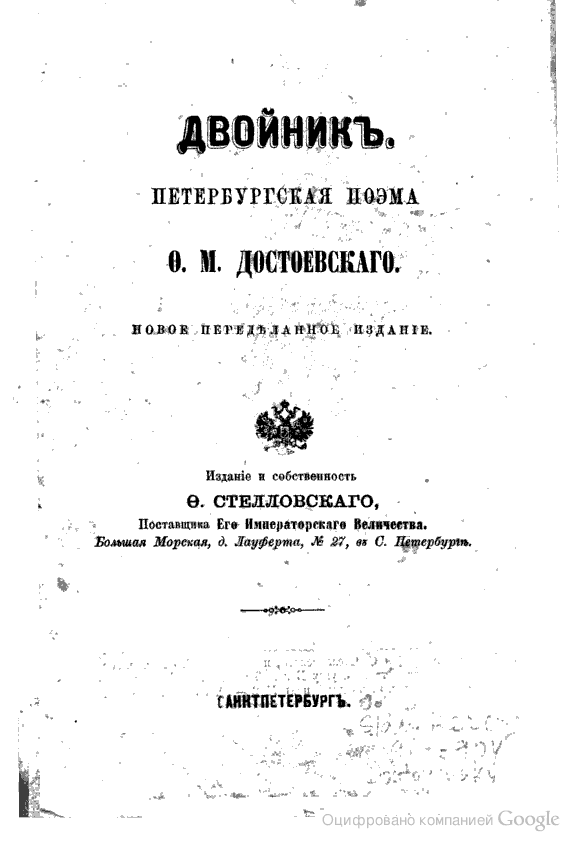
- Author: Fyodor Dostoyevsky
- Original title: Двойникъ
- Translator: Constance Garnett; George Bird; Richard Pevear and Larissa Volokhonsky; Evelyn Harden; Hugh Aplin
- Language: Russian
- Genre: novel
- Publisher: Otechestvennye zapiski
- Publication date: January 30, 1846
- Publication place: Russia
- Dewey Decimal: 891.7332
- LC Class: PG3326 .D8
- Original text: Двойникъ at Russian Wikisource

The Double: A Petersburg Poem (Russian: Двойник. Петербургская поэма, romanized: Dvoynik. Peterburgskaya poema) is the second novel written by Fyodor Dostoevsky. It was first published on 30 January 1846 in the Otechestvennye zapiski. It was subsequently revised and republished by Dostoevsky in 1866.

== Plot summary ==
In Saint Petersburg, Yakov Petrovich Golyadkin works as a titular councillor (rank 9 in the Table of Ranks established by Peter the Great), a low-level bureaucrat struggling to succeed.

Golyadkin's physician, Doctor Rutenspitz, fears for Golyadkin's sanity and tells him that his behaviour is dangerously antisocial. He prescribes "cheerful company" as the remedy. Golyadkin resolves to try this. Though uninvited, he proceeds to the birthday party of Klara Olsufyevna, the daughter of his office manager. A series of social blunders leads to his expulsion from the party. On his way home through a snowstorm, he encounters a man who looks exactly like him, his double ("Golyadkin Jr.").

At first, Golyadkin and his double are friends, but Golyadkin Jr. proceeds to attempt to take over Sr.'s life, and they become bitter enemies. Because Golyadkin Jr. has all the charm, unctuousness and social skills that Golyadkin Sr. lacks, he is very well-liked among the office colleagues. At the story's conclusion, Golyadkin Sr. begins to see many replicas of himself, has a psychotic break, and is dragged off to an asylum by Doctor Rutenspitz.

== Influences ==
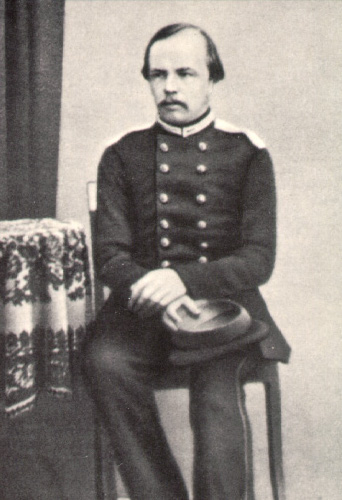
Dostoevsky in 1858/59

Cover of The Double

The Double is the most Gogolesque of Dostoevsky's works; its subtitle "A Petersburg Poem" echoes that of Gogol's Dead Souls. Vladimir Nabokov called it a parody of "The Overcoat". Many others have emphasised the relationship between The Double and other of Gogol's Petersburg Tales. One contemporary critic, Konstantin Aksakov, remarked that "Dostoevsky alters and wholly repeats Gogol's phrases". Most scholars, however, recognise The Double as Dostoevsky's response to or innovation on Gogol's work. For example, A. L. Bem called The Double "a unique literary rebuttal" to Gogol's story "The Nose".

This immediate relationship is the obvious manifestation of Dostoevsky's entry into the deeper tradition of German Romanticism, particularly the writings of E. T. A. Hoffmann.

== Critical reception ==
The Double has been interpreted in a number of ways. Looking backwards, it is viewed as Dostoevsky's innovation on Gogol. Looking forwards, it is often read as a psychosocial version of his later ethical-psychological works. These two readings, together, position The Double at a critical juncture in Dostoevsky's writing at which he was still synthesising what preceded him but also adding in elements of his own. One such element was that Dostoevsky switched the focus from Gogol's social perspective in which the main characters are viewed and interpreted socially to a psychological context that gives the characters more emotional depth and internal motivation.

As to the interpretation of the work itself, there are three major trends in scholarship. First, many have said that Golyadkin simply goes insane, probably with schizophrenia. This view is supported by much of the text, particularly Golyadkin's innumerable hallucinations. Second, many have focused on Golyadkin's search for identity. One critic wrote that The Double's main idea is that "the human will in its search for total freedom of expression becomes a self-destructive impulse".

This individualistic focus is often contextualised by scholars, such as Joseph Frank, who emphasise that Golyadkin's identity is crushed by the bureaucracy and stifling society he lives in.

The final context of understanding for The Double that transcends all three categories is the ongoing debate about its literary quality. While the majority of scholars have regarded it as somewhere from "too fragile to bear its significance" to utterly unreadable, there have been two notable exceptions. Dostoevsky wrote in A Writer's Diary that "Most decidedly, I did not succeed with that novel; however, its idea was rather lucid, and I have never expressed in my writings anything more serious. Still, as far as form was concerned, I failed utterly." Vladimir Nabokov, who generally regarded Dostoevsky as a "rather mediocre" writer, called The Double "the best thing he ever wrote", saying that it is "a perfect work of art".

== Adaptations ==
The story was adapted into a British film, The Double, released in 2013, starring Jesse Eisenberg.

A one-hour radio adaptation by Jonathan Holloway and directed by Gemma Jenkins, changing the time period from Tsarist Russia to "a steampunk version of 19th-century St. Petersburg", was broadcast on BBC Radio 4 as part of their Dangerous Visions series on 10 June 2018. The cast included Joseph Millson as Golyadkin/The Double and Elizabeth Counsell as Dr. Rutenspitz.
