= Norma Cossetto =

Istrian Italian student, killed by the Yugoslavian communists

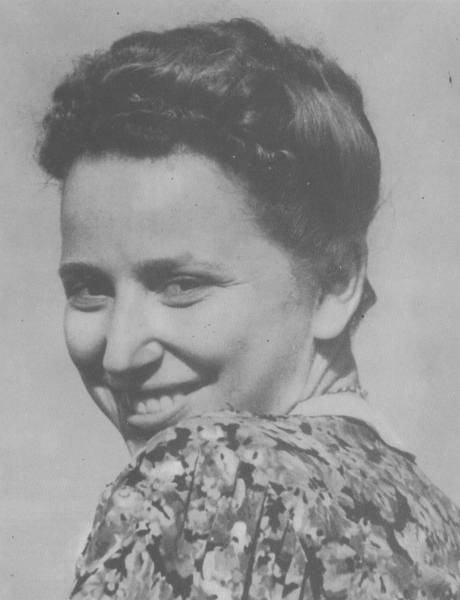
- Norma Cossetto in 1943
- Born: 17 May 1920; Visinada, Italy (present-day Vižinada, Croatia)
- Died: October 4–5 1943; Villa Surani, Italy
- Cause of death: Homicide by pushing
- Body discovered: October 1943
- Occupation: Student
- Known for: Murder victim
- Parent: Giuseppe Cossetto

Norma Cossetto (17 May 1920 – 4/5 October 1943) was an Istrian Italian student, killed by the Yugoslavian communists and thrown into a foiba.

== Early life ==
The Cossetto family lived in the hamlet of Santa Domenica in Visinada (today Vižinada, Croatia), where Norma was born in 1920. Her father, Giuseppe, was a local leader of the National Fascist Party; he had held several posts and also served as podestà (mayor) of Visinada. He enlisted in the Voluntary Militia for National Security and, after the Armistice between Italy and the Allies was made public on 8 September 1943, he was deployed to Trieste.

Norma had attended the Regio Liceo Vittorio Emanuele III in Gorizia; after her graduation, she enrolled at the University of Padova and studied Italian Literature, while also joining the Fascist University Group in Pola. Since 1941, she had worked as a substitute teacher in Pisino and Parenzo. During the summer of 1943, she was writing her degree thesis, Istria rossa ("Red Istria", in reference to the rich ores of reddish bauxite in Istria), and she would tour the surrounding villages and parsonages with her cycle in order to collect information about her dissertation.

== Capture and assassination ==
As later testified by Licia Cossetto, Norma's sister, their family began to receive threats after the 8 September Armistice; on the 25 September, their home was plundered by Yugoslavian and Italian resistance fighters. The following day, Norma was summoned at the resistance headquarters, stationed in the former Carabinieri barracks in Visignano. She was instructed to join the resistance movement, but she bluntly declined such an invitation; on the other hand, Giacomo Scotti reports, without sourcing his claim, that Cossetto refused to deny her allegiance to Fascism. However, one of her keepers decreed to let her go.

On the 27 September, she was detained again and brought to the former Guardia di Finanza barracks in Parenzo, with some relatives and friends. Her sister Licia arrived and tried to sue her release, but to no avail. As the Germans occupied Visinada after a few days, the resistance transferred the prisoners in the school in Antignana. In the school, Cossetto was kept apart from the other prisoners, tied to a table, and repeatedly tortured and raped by her captors. This was later reported to Licia Cossetto by a woman who lived in front of the school. Between 4 and 5 October, the prisoners were bound with wire, forcibly walked to Villa Surani, and thrown in the nearby foiba. The three female prisoners were again raped on the spot before they were thrown in the foiba. After a few days, Licia Cossetto was arrested by the resistance and invited to join their movement; just like her sister, she refused. One of the fighters, an acquaintance of Licia, pleaded for her release. The foiba where Norma was thrown is near Pirano in what is now Slovenian Istria. Other foibe were found nearby, with hundreds of corpses (including those of Albina, Caterina and Fosca Radecchi, and Amalia Ardossi), both Italians and non, fascists and antifascists.

== Legacy ==
After the Second World War, Cossetto's death has been considered emblematic of the Foibe massacres and ethnic cleansings of Italians by Yugoslavs in Istria. In 1949, the University of Padova conferred to her the laurea "honorary" and in 2005, the Italian President Ciampi awarded her the "Medaglia d'oro al merito civile". In February 2010 she was commemorated during the National Memorial Day of the Exiles and Foibe. In July 2011, the cities of Trieste and Narni (Terni) dedicated streets to her memory, followed by Rome in 2015.

The controversial 2018 feature film Red Land highlights the story of Cossetto.

== See also ==
- Foibe massacres – Mass killings and ethnic cleansing against Italians and pro-Italian Slavs
- List of kidnappings
- Maria Pasquinelli – Italian teacher and murderer (1913–2013)
- National Memorial Day of the Exiles and Foibe – Public holiday in Italy

== Bibliography ==
- Arrigo Petacco, L'esodo. La tragedia negata degli italiani d'Istria, Dalmazia e Venezia Giulia, Milano, Mondadori, 1999, ISBN 88-520-1368-7.
- Frediano Sessi, Foibe rosse. Vita di Norma Cossetto uccisa in Istria nel '43, Venezia, Marsilio, 2007, ISBN 88-317-9147-8.
