= Crimewave =

1985 film by Sam Raimi

- VHS release cover
- Directed by: Sam Raimi
- Written by: Joel Coen; Ethan Coen; Sam Raimi
- Produced by: Robert Tapert
- Starring: Louise Lasser; Paul L. Smith; Brion James; Sheree J. Wilson; Edward R. Pressman; Bruce Campbell; Reed Birney
- Cinematography: Robert Primes
- Edited by: Michael Kelly; Kathie Weaver; Kaye Davis
- Music by: Arlon Ober
- Production companies: Embassy Films Associates; Renaissance Pictures
- Distributed by: Embassy Films Associates
- Release date: April 12, 1985
- Running time: 86 minutes
- Country: United States
- Language: English
- Budget: $2.5 million
- Box office: $5,101

Crimewave is a 1985 American comedy film directed by Sam Raimi, from a screenplay he co-wrote with the Coen brothers. It stars Reed Birney, Sheree J. Wilson, Paul L. Smith, Brion James, Louise Lasser and Bruce Campbell, with Campbell also serving as a co-producer. An unusual slapstick mix of film noir, black comedy, Hitchcockian suspense, and B-movie conventions, Crimewave portrays bizarre situations involving a nebbish everyman (Birney) entangled in a murderous plot while pursuing his love interest (Wilson).

Following the commercial success of The Evil Dead (1981), Raimi and Campbell decided to collaborate on another project. Joel Coen served as one of the editors on The Evil Dead and worked with Raimi on the screenplay. Production was difficult for several members of the crew and the production studio, Embassy Pictures, refused to allow Raimi to edit the film. Several arguments broke out during the shoot of the film due to continued interference by the studio.

The film was a box-office flop and has since fallen into relative obscurity outside of fans of Campbell and Raimi. Few critics reviewed it upon release, though the little amount of critical attention it received was mostly negative. Several story and style elements found in Crimewave influenced later productions by Raimi, and its overall failure directly led to the inception of Evil Dead II (1987). Over time, the film has achieved the status of a minor cult film.

== Plot ==
Victor Ajax has been sentenced to death, sitting in an electric chair. In a flashback, we learn that Victor once was a promising young technician in the employ of Trend-Odegard Security. Mr. Trend, co-owner of the company, has learned of a plan by his partner to sell the company to Renaldo "The Heel" (who stole Nancy and bullied Victor by beating him up and calling him a loser) and responds by hiring two exterminators who promise to "kill all sizes" in order to eliminate Odegard and his plan. When Victor, who has been installing security cameras in Trend's apartment building, seems about to go back to the store, Trend distracts him with a lecture about "the grand design" and sends Victor on a quest to find his dream girl.

The dream girl is found in the form of Nancy, who responds minimally to Vic but is enamored of Renaldo. Victor and several residents of the building, including Mrs. Trend, run afoul of the killers, and a seemingly random series of slapstick murders occur, for all of which Victor is ultimately blamed. Nancy inevitably becomes a target and Vic saves her and kills the exterminators after a long comical fight sequence. The flashback ends and Victor is in the electric chair and awaits his execution while an elaborate race sequence occurs in which Nancy, accompanied by several nuns, drives manically to the scene in order to prove his innocence. Nancy arrives just before the switch is pulled and clears Victor's name. The movie concludes with their marriage.

== Cast ==
- Louise Lasser as Helene Trend
- Paul L. Smith as Faron Crush
- Brion James as Arthur Coddish
- Sheree J. Wilson as Nancy
- Edward R. Pressman as Ernest Trend
- Bruce Campbell as Renaldo "The Heel"
- Reed Birney as Victor Ajax
- Antonio Fargas as Blind man
- Richard Bright as Officer Brennan
- Emil Sitka as Col. Rodgers
- Wiley Harker as Governor
- Robert Symonds as Guard #1
- Frances McDormand as Nun
- Ted Raimi as Waiter

Uncredited

- Ethan and Joel Coen as Execution reporters
- Rob Tapert as Bar patron in Rialto
- Julie Harris as Old woman

== Production ==
=== Background ===
By 1983, long-time friends Campbell and Raimi had collaborated on several projects together. The duo had just completed the production of Within the Woods and The Evil Dead, the latter of which was a box-office and critical hit. Following his involvement in The Evil Dead, Campbell had difficulty establishing a career as an actor. He appeared on the soap opera Generations, and in several local Detroit commercial ads. Meanwhile, Raimi had been collaborating with Ethan and Joel Coen on a screenplay. Joel Coen had been one of the editors on The Evil Dead, which led to him befriending Raimi. Joel Coen's experience editing The Evil Dead inspired him to complete his own film, Blood Simple, which was released to critical acclaim. The script would later develop into Relentless, a narrative about "two crazed killers."

Raimi was not initially optimistic about the talents of the Coen brothers. He recounted that Ethan was "just a statistic accountant at Macy's at the time." After reading the Blood Simple script, however, Campbell commented that the screenplay was "great", comparing it to the work of Alfred Hitchcock. It featured "mild-mannered leading men" who "get caught up in a web of fear, murder and mayhem", elements that often defined the films directed by Hitchcock. Distributor Irvin Shapiro, who was instrumental in the commercial success of The Evil Dead, did not like the title of Relentless. He suggested putting "X" and "Murder" in the title, believing it would be more enticing to audiences. With Shapiro's suggestion in mind, Raimi gave the film the tentative title of The XYZ Murders.

=== Filming ===
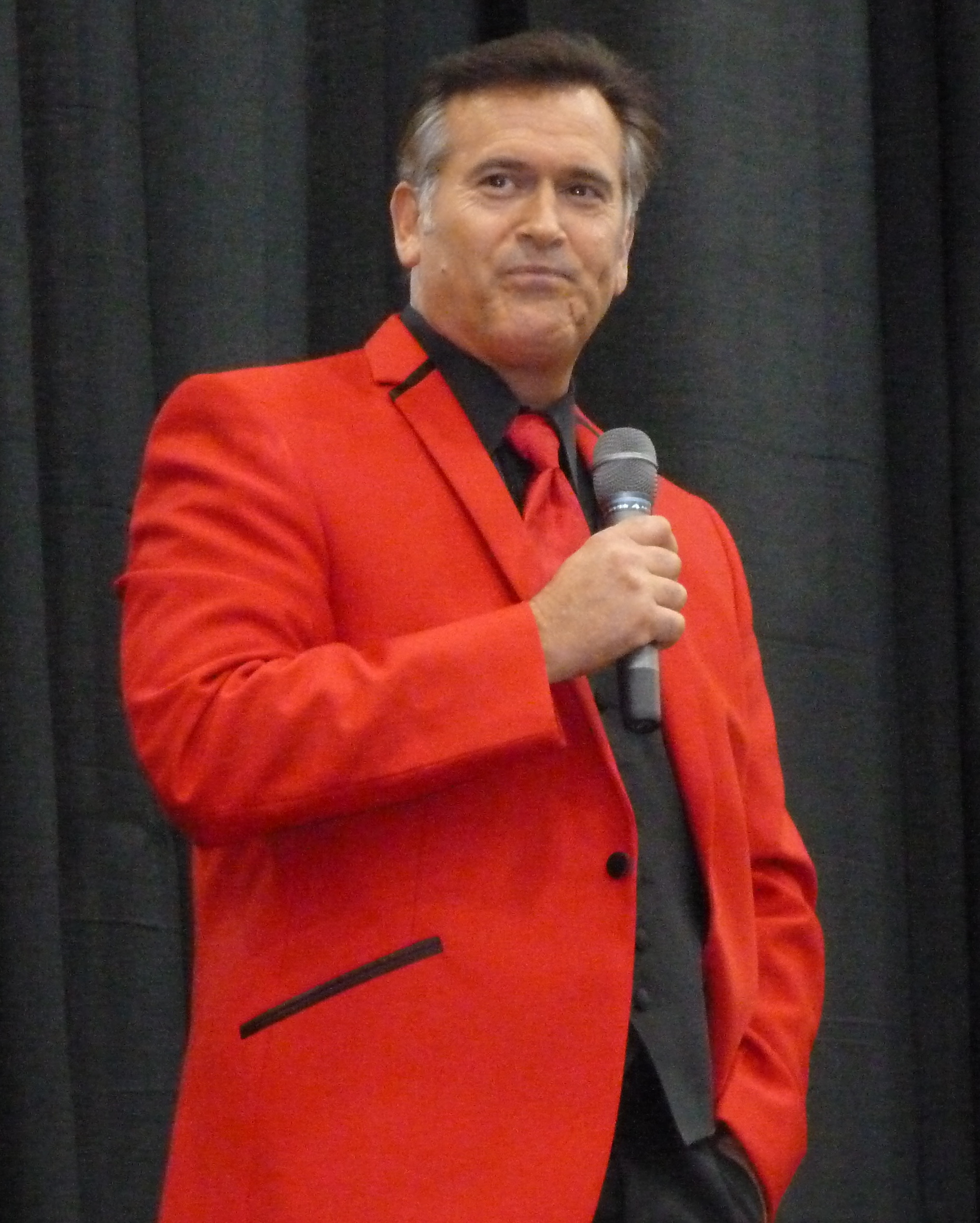
Sam Raimi wanted his friend Bruce Campbell (pictured) to star in the film; however, producers wanted a "Hollywood" actor instead.

Given the commercial success of The Evil Dead, studio financial backing for the new project came quickly. Though Raimi and Campbell did not profit from the film, the studio believed in Raimi, initially allowing the director complete creative control on the project; however, executives later took control of the production. Raimi and Campbell developed the project with Embassy Pictures' producer Norman Lear, who supposedly had a "Midas touch", because of the consistent success he had attained from various television productions. He suggested the title Crimewave, which was ultimately used.

Raimi and the studio clashed several times during production. The first disagreement between the director and the executives stemmed from the latter's insistence on casting a "Hollywood" actor in the lead role instead of Raimi's long-time collaborator and friend Campbell. In his 2002 autobiography If Chins Could Kill: Confessions of a B Movie Actor, Campbell commented about how difficult it was working with more established producers; "jumping into the big time meant dealing with the excruciatingly specific and alternately vague demands of a studio, ... Hollywood executives took an interest in everything." Campbell was surprised that he had to audition for the lead role, as he did not have to test for The Evil Dead. Campbell and his photographer friend Mike Ditz used a 16 mm film camera and shot a scene to show to the producers. Upon viewing it, the producers asserted that "Campbell will not star in this film". In retaliation, Raimi lengthened a supporting role and gave it to Campbell: the character of Renaldo "The Heel". This allowed for Campbell to be present through the production, which Campbell later noted was a good thing, as due to the constant studio interference "Sam needed all the help he could get".

Raimi budgeted the film at $2.5 million, an amount the studio greenlit. But the calculations had not taken union fees and regulations into account, making the proposed budgeting and scheduling unrealistic. In addition, the crew were talked into spending three times the allotted money for one shooting location. The shoot quickly went both over budget and over schedule. At that point, the studio stepped in, with executives demanding cuts in the script, budget restrictions, layoffs, and their own supervision of the project. The studio also insisted on reviewing every batch of dailies, criticizing the decision to use cast and crew members (including Campbell) as extras in several scenes (a Raimi trademark known as "Shemping").

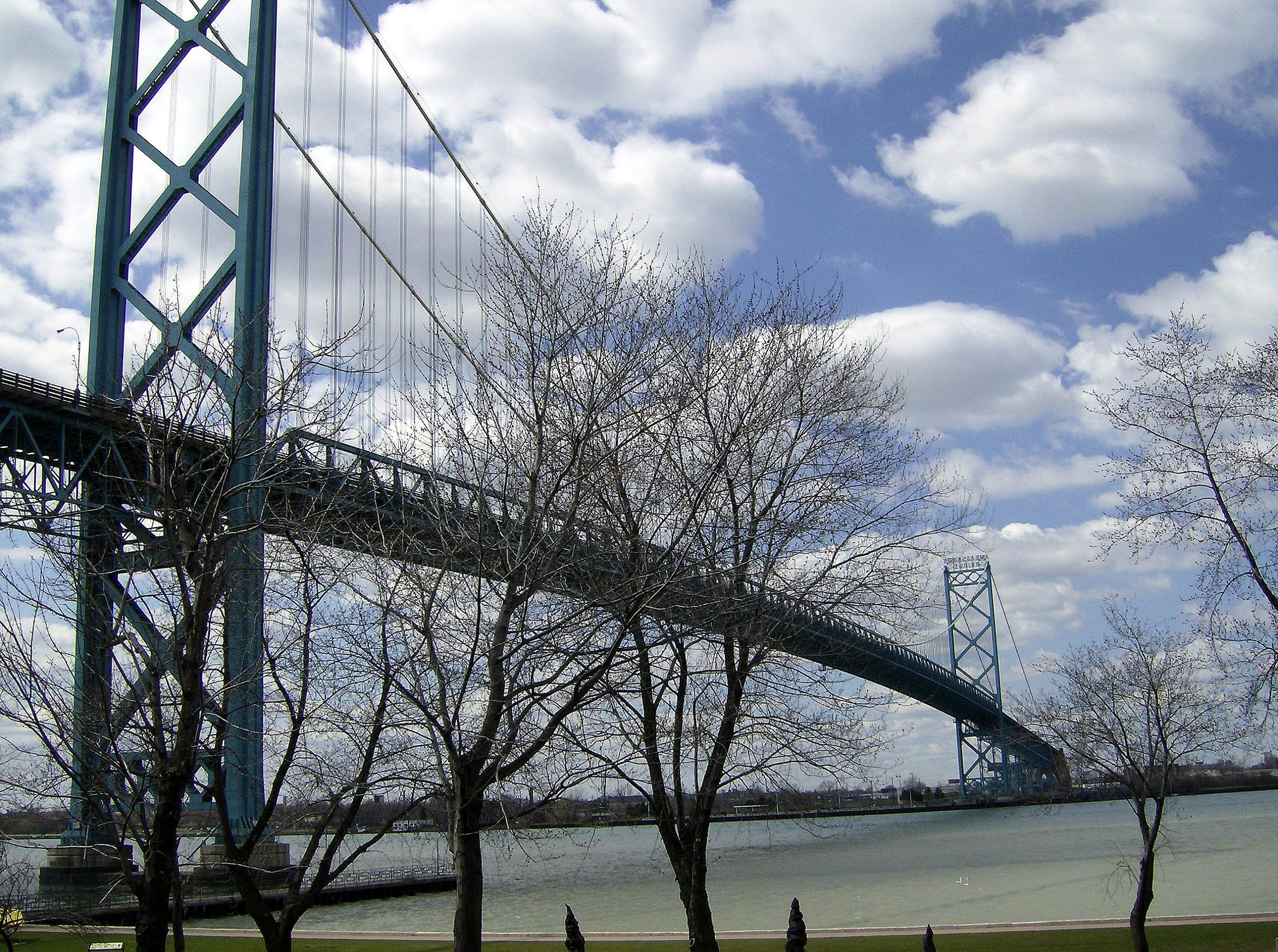
Because the Detroit River was frozen, the cast had to use dynamite to achieve a shot of the water.

Even without Embassy's interference, however, the production was plagued with difficulties. According to Campbell, lead actress Lasser—under the influence of cocaine—fired her make-up artist. She insisted that she apply all her own make-up, despite objections from the cast. She would often show up on set with poorly applied "clown make-up" and messed up hair, oblivious to how she appeared. There were occasions when she outright refused to leave her trailer, to the annoyance of the cast and crew. Production was often affected by "weird" events; actor Brion James trashed his hotel room in an attempt to "exorcise a ghost from his light fixtures".

At one point, shooting was to take place at a bridge overlooking the Detroit River, which was frozen at the time. The script, however, called for clear and running water, meaning that the crew had to brave dangerously low temperatures and conditions to clear the ice; finally they blew up the ice with dynamite. At another time, the crew spent a week filming on a Detroit street after dark, directly under a nursing home, with huge wind machines blowing for long hours. One evening a glass bottle with a note in it crashed to the ground from an upper floor. The note inside read, "The noise is keeping me awake all night long and I am getting sick. I am dying because of you." The production of the film was a "disaster" according to Campbell, who stated that usually "missteps" like Crimewave lead to the end of a director's career.

=== Post-production ===
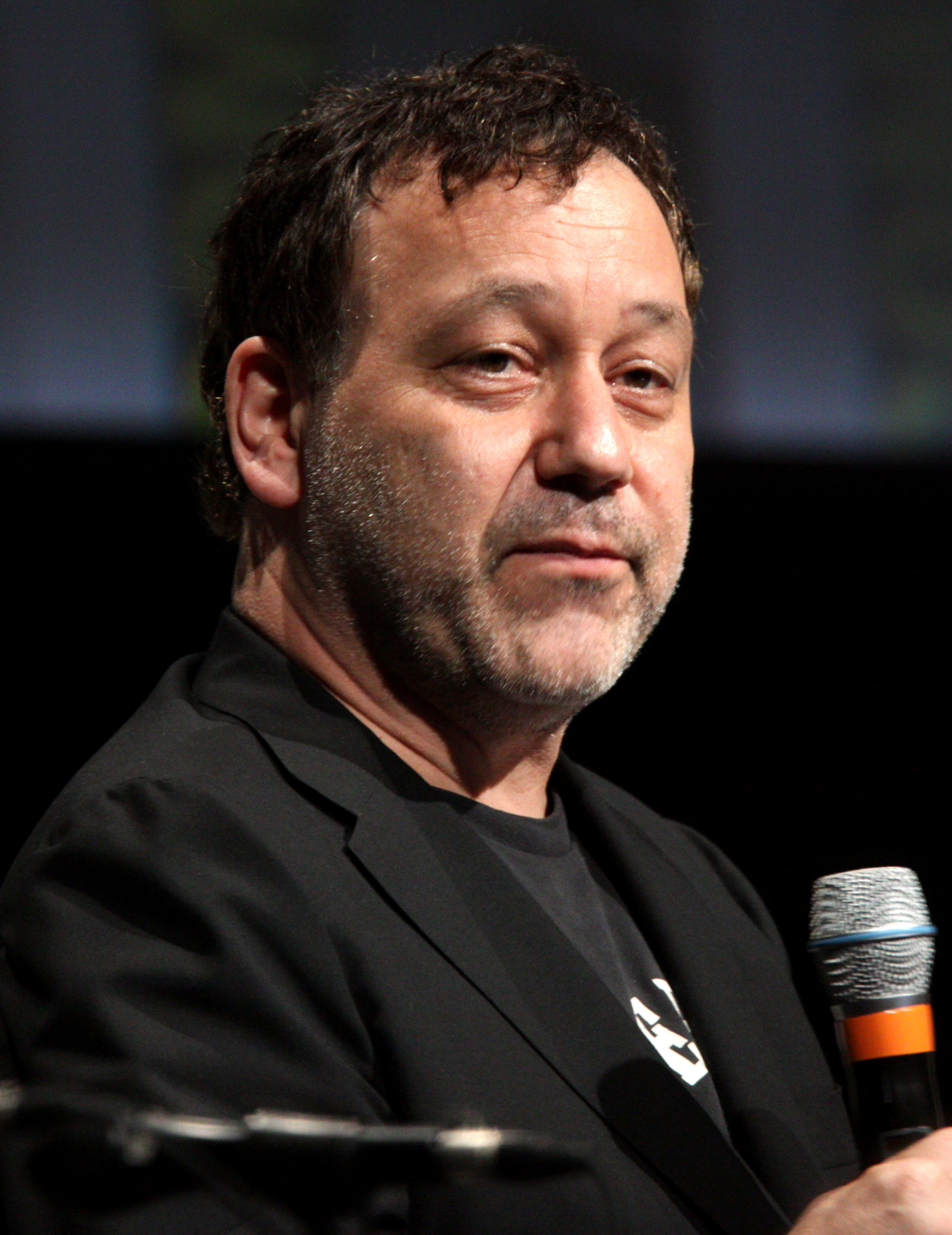
Director Sam Raimi was not allowed by the studio to edit Crimewave.

In post-production, Embassy's self-imposed role in making Crimewave was even greater. Although Raimi, Tapert, and Campbell insisted that they had made the film as partners, the studio refused — because of the already ballooning costs — to pay for Campbell to stay in Los Angeles during post-production (although the executives later compromised). The studio replaced Raimi's music composer, Joseph LoDuca, with one of its own choosing. It did the same with the editor, removing Raimi's influence over the film's final cut.

An argument broke out near the end of the post-production between Campbell and the producers. Campbell argued that he and Raimi had always been closely involved with their own films' editing, describing the behavior of the producers as "nickel-and-dime-bullshit". One of the producers replied by calling Campbell an "asshole", commenting that the crew had gone severely over budget. The difficulty during production left a negative impression on Campbell, who insisted that he never wanted to work with big-budget movie producers again, describing the conduct as "soulless" and "just a business." Raimi commented negatively about the process too, musing that "it was really wrong. It was such a horrible, horrible, horrible, depressing scene."

== Release and reception ==
After all the editing imposed by the studio, Crimewave still became a box-office flop. Campbell reasoned that "cross-genre" films "send marketing people scurrying under a desk". According to him, the film was hard to market because it featured elements of horror films, comedies, and dramas. To make matters even more confusing, in France and Italy, the film's title was changed to Death on the Grill and The Two Craziest Killers in the World respectively. In the United States, the film was only released in Santa Cruz, California; Kansas; and Alaska, to make the film eligible for HBO broadcasting. Upon release, the film "went down in box-office flames", with Campbell commenting "it wasn't released. It escaped!" The "only good" screening came the Seattle International Film Festival, where the movie was promoted as a novelty film.

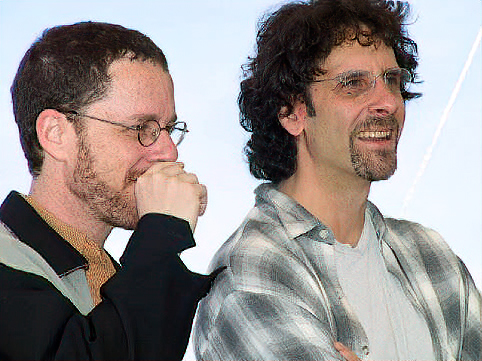
The screenplay written by the Coen brothers received a mixed reception by critics.

Along with Raimi and Campbell, film critics were largely dismissive of the film. A writer for Time Out gave a negative review, writing "despite its ambition and a Coen Brothers script credit, Raimi's second film was a disappointment after his astonishing debut The Evil Dead." The writer did however compliment some of the set pieces featured in the film, ultimately commenting that only people interested in the early work by Raimi would be interested. Film Junk writer Sean Harley commented that if the same filmmakers had released a movie today, "based on their impressive filmographies and the cult followings that both have amassed, a collaboration of this magnitude would be a cinematic event like no other." However, he said that this film was "not a particularly brilliant movie, and it's easily one of the weakest projects that any of these great filmmakers have been involved in." He noted that fans of Raimi's films would likely find it interesting and gave the film a weak recommendation.

Leonard Maltin awarded the film two and a half stars out of four, describing it a "weird, almost incoherent crime story." Celluloid Dream's Simon Hill commented that the writing was a disappointment, musing that it did however feature "glimpses of the director" Raimi would become. A scene of a murder in an office reminded him of a scene from Spider-Man 2, a film also directed by Raimi. He commented that "even in his small part Campbell is the most memorable character in the film", also praising the performance of the two exterminators. The film has achieved the status of a minor cult film. In one of the few positive notices, MTV writer Adam Rosenberg described the film as "criminally underrated". Rosenberg disagreed with the consensus about the film, labeling it as a "hard-to-find classic". Kim Newman also called the film underrated, writing that the film "revels" in its slapstick nature, taking influence from everything from horror comics to The Three Stooges.

Colin Greenland reviewed Crimewave for White Dwarf #77, and stated that "Crimewave, from the men who brought you The Evil Dead, is a hit-and-miss send-up of Forties' crime comics, with all the wild angles and grotesque characterization. It's not far from those very early MAD parodies, and similarly, you'll either love or hate it."

On the review aggregator website Rotten Tomatoes, 57% of seven critics' reviews are positive, with an average rating of 6.4/10. Metacritic, which uses a weighted average, assigned the film a score of 34 out of 100, based on 4 critics, indicating "generally unfavorable" reviews.

== Aftermath ==
Raimi cited the experience as one of the least favorite moments of his career:

“I can't look at it. It's so painful. The experience was just awful. Bruce Campbell was supposed to star. A month, two months before, the studio said, 'No, he's not starring in it.' My composer was removed – Joe LoDuca, who did the Evil Dead movies. They didn't let me do a director's cut. They fired my editor about two weeks in, after we'd done shooting, and they brought the film out of Detroit to Los Angeles. They had their own editor cut it, they had their own components. It was just a mess.“

Campbell described the film as a "lesson about abject failure", writing "no matter how you slice it, the film was a dog and pretty much everyone involved can line up to take forty whacks. As filmmakers, we failed to execute a misguided concept and our studio refused us the benefit of any doubt." The Coen brothers expressed similar dissatisfaction with the film, and directed every one of their screenplays until the 2012 film Gambit. John Cameron, second assistant director on the film, remarked, "I see Crimewave as a real turning point in a certain way, because if you survived that experience, nothing in the business could ever be as hard again."

Raimi had the studio support to make a sequel to The Evil Dead, which he initially decided to make out of desperation. His career quickly recovered after Evil Dead II was released in 1987 and became a box office success. Raimi and the Coens remained friends, and the duo included Campbell in some of their films such as The Hudsucker Proxy (1994), Fargo (1996) and Intolerable Cruelty (2003), the former of which was co-written by Raimi. Elements of Crimewave were re-used by frequent Raimi collaborator Josh Becker for the movie Lunatics: A Love Story, as well as by Raimi himself in Spider-Man and its sequels. In 2010, a Funny or Die comedy video featuring actors James Franco and Bill Hader paid tribute to Raimi. In a parody of a scene from Spider-Man 2, the actors discussed Crimewave among Raimi's other films. Collider's Matt Goldberg stated, "I think this sketch features the first reference to Crimewave ever".

== Home media ==
Shout! Factory released Crimewave on Blu-ray/DVD Combo Pack on May 14, 2013.

== Works cited ==
- Campbell, Bruce (2002). If Chins Could Kill: Confessions of a B Movie Actor. L.A. Weekly Books. ISBN 978-0-312-29145-7.
- Egan, Kate (2011). The Evil Dead. Wallflower Press. ISBN 978-1-906660-34-5.
- Konow, David (2008). Reel Terror: The Scary, Bloody, Gory, Hundred-Year History of Classic Horror Films. St. Martin's Press. ISBN 978-0-312-66883-9.
- Maltin, Leonard (2009). Leonard Maltin's 2010 Movie Guide. Signet. ISBN 978-0-451-22764-5.
- Muir, John Kenneth (2004). The Unseen Force: the Films of Sam Raimi. Applause Theatre & Cinema Books. ISBN 978-1-55783-607-6.
- Newman, Kim (2011). Nightmare Movies: Horror on Screen Since the 1960s. Bloomsbury Publishing. ISBN 978-1-4088-0503-9.
- Paul, Louis (2007). Tales from the Cult Film Trenches: Interviews with 36 Actors from Horror, Science Fiction and Exploitation Cinema. McFarland & Company. ISBN 978-0-7864-2994-3.
- Pooley, Eric (1987). Warped in America: The Dark Visions of Joel and Ethan Coen. New York Magazine. ISBN 978-0-7864-2821-2.
- Robson, Eddie (2010). Coen Brothers (Virgin Film). Virgin Books. ISBN 978-0-7535-1268-5.
- Truffaut, François (1985). Hitchcock/Truffaut. Simon and Schuster. ISBN 0-671-60429-5.
- Winston Dixon, Wheeler (2010). A History of Horror. Rutgers University Press. ISBN 978-0-8135-4796-1.
- Žižek, Slavoj (2000). The Ticklish Subject: The Absent Centre of Political Ontology. Verso. ISBN 978-1-85984-291-1.
