= 15th Saturn Awards =

US film and television award ceremony

- Date: August 23, 1988
- Site: California, U.S.

Highlights
- Most awards: RoboCop (5)
- Most nominations: RoboCop (8)

The 15th Saturn Awards, honoring the best in science fiction, fantasy and horror film in 1987, were held on August 23, 1988.

The winners were announced on April 7, 1988. The sci-fi action film RoboCop won five awards, including Best Science Fiction Film.

== Winners and nominees ==
Below is a complete list of nominees and winners. Winners are highlighted in bold.

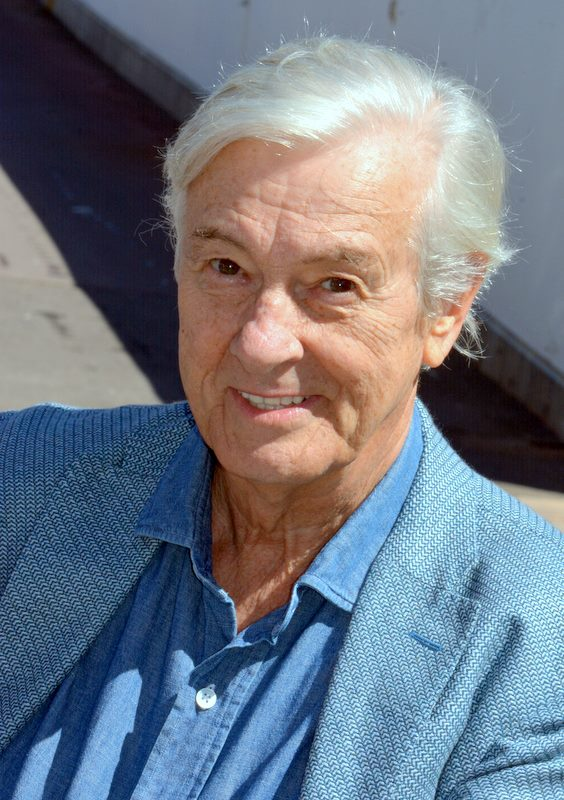
Paul Verhoeven, Best Director winner

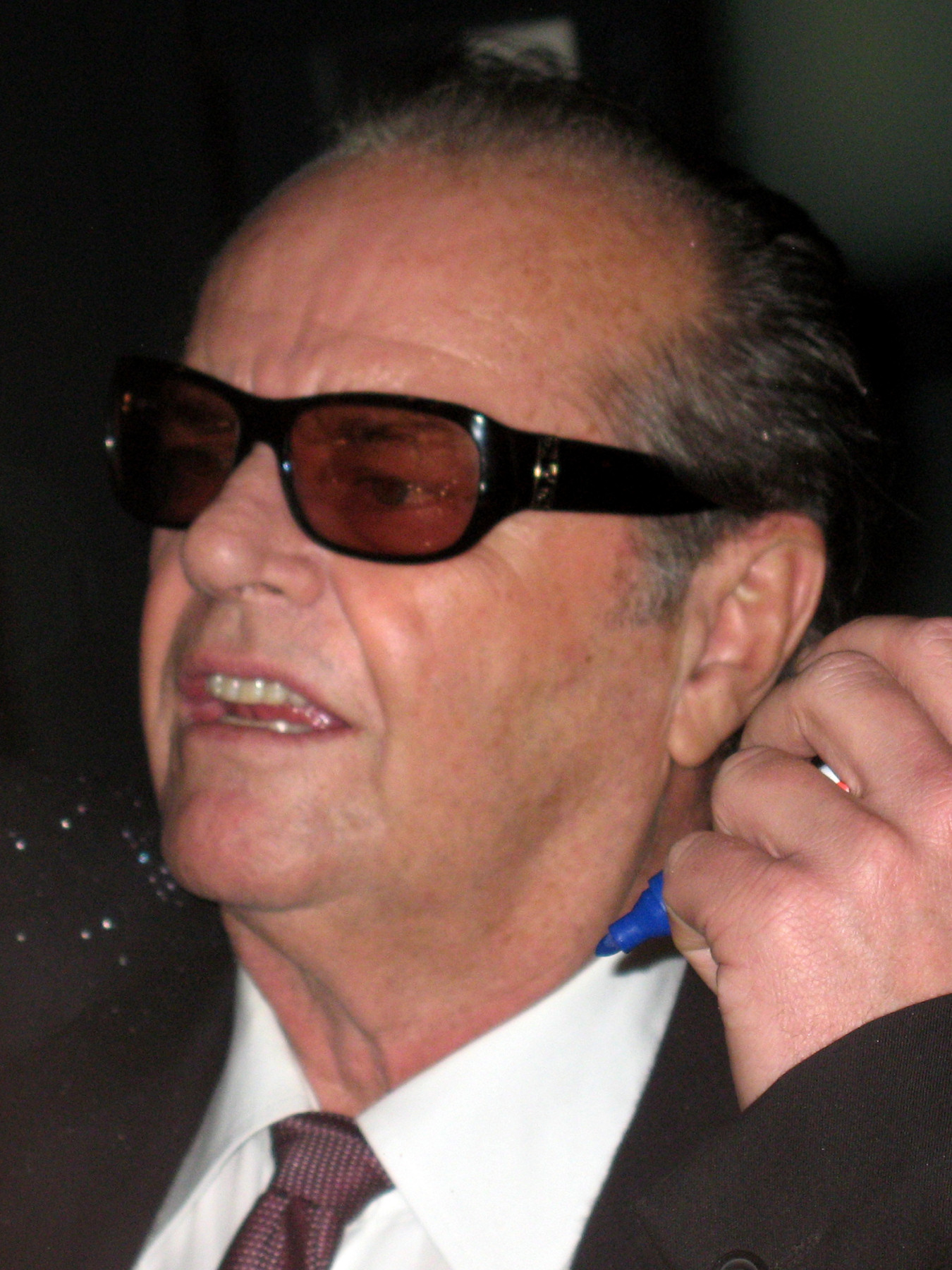
Jack Nicholson, Best Actor winner

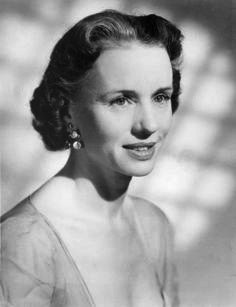
Jessica Tandy, Best Actress winner

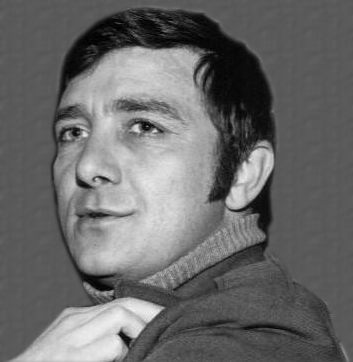
Richard Dawson, Best Supporting Actor winner

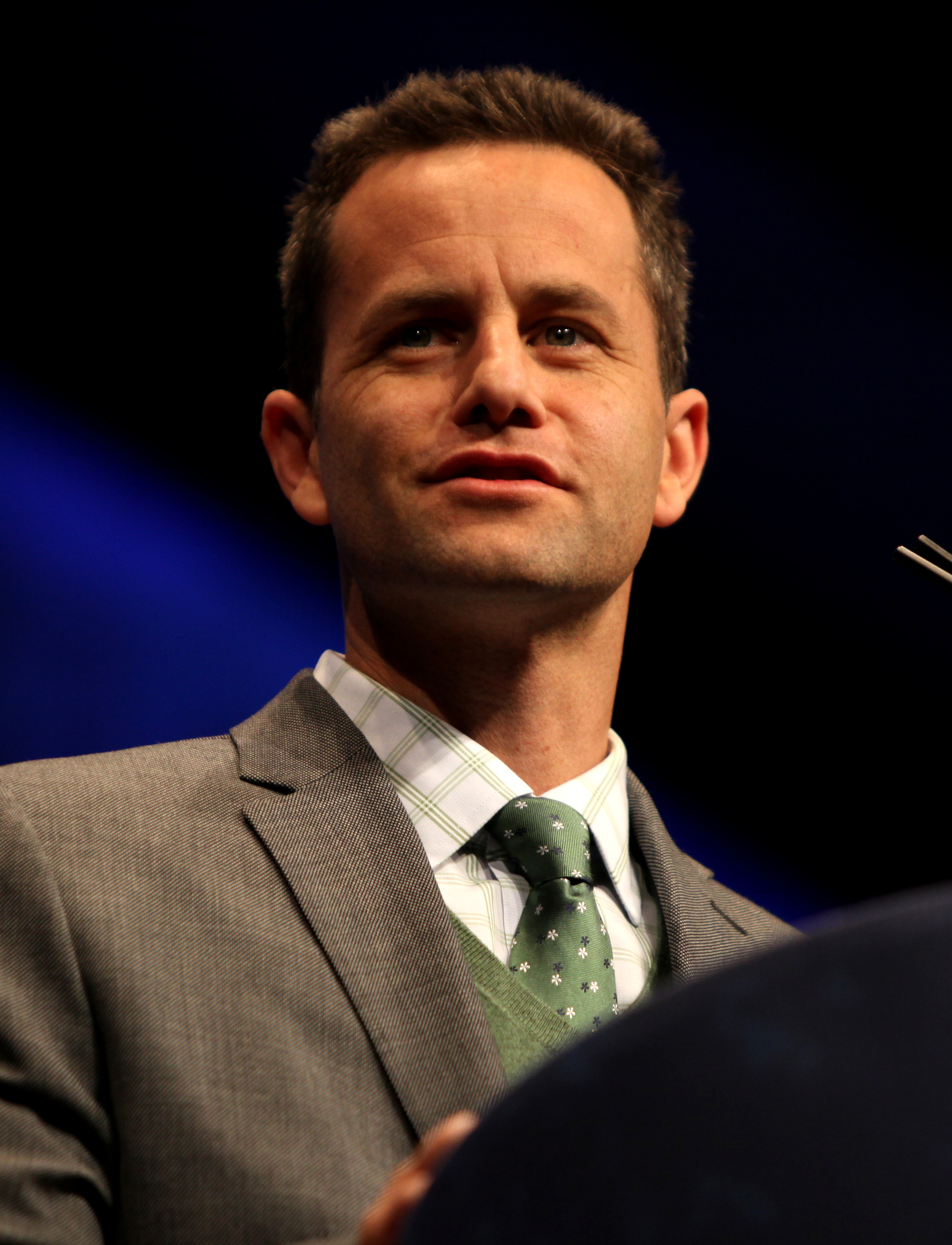
Kirk Cameron, Best Performance by a Younger Actor winner

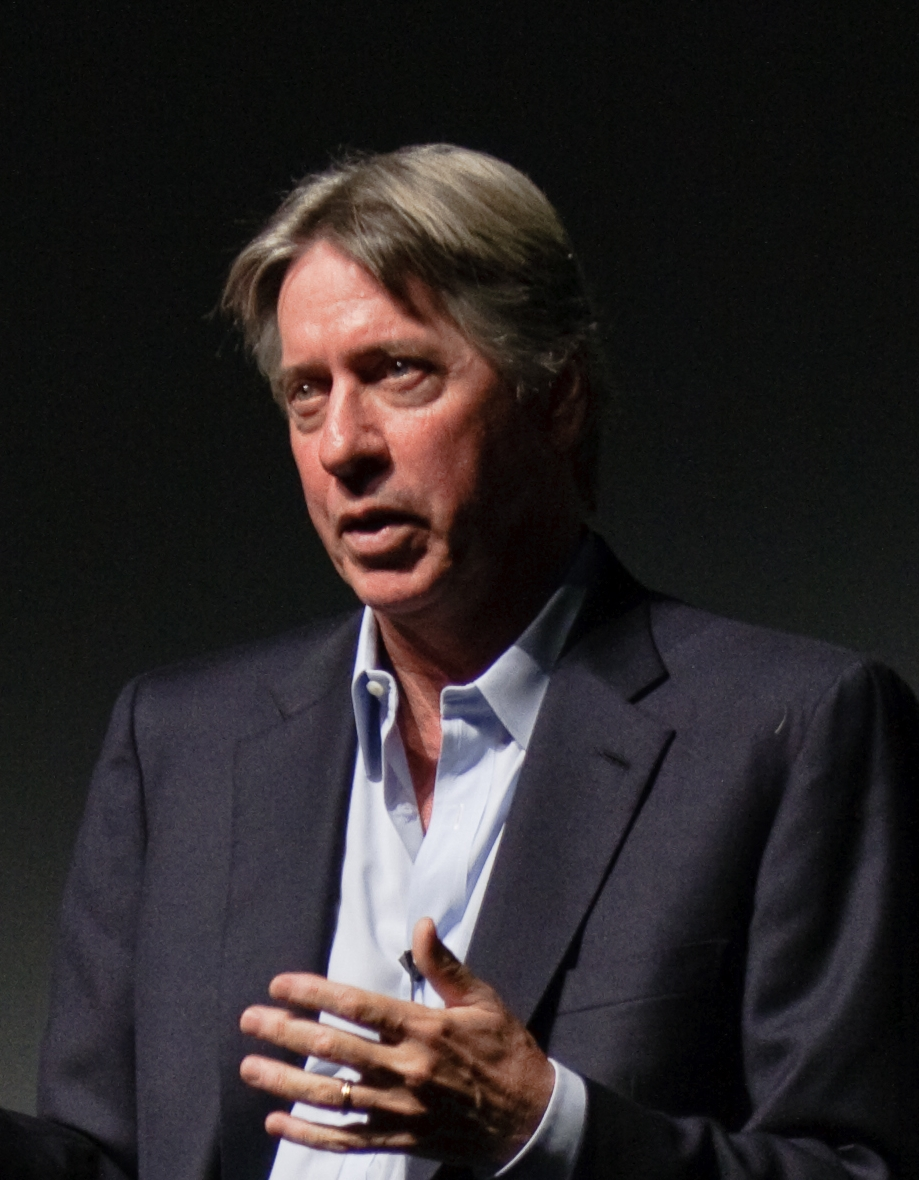
Alan Silvestri, Best Music winner

=== Film awards ===
Best Science Fiction Film	Best Fantasy Film
**RoboCop**; The Hidden; Innerspace; Masters of the Universe; Predator; The Running Man	**The Princess Bride**; Batteries Not Included; Date with an Angel; Harry and the Hendersons; The Living Daylights; The Witches of Eastwick
Best Horror Film	Best Director
**The Lost Boys**; Evil Dead II; Hellraiser; Near Dark; A Nightmare on Elm Street 3: Dream Warriors; Pumpkinhead	**Paul Verhoeven – RoboCop**; Kathryn Bigelow – Near Dark; Joe Dante – Innerspace; William Dear – Harry and the Hendersons; Jack Sholder – The Hidden; Stan Winston – Pumpkinhead
Best Actor	Best Actress
**Jack Nicholson – The Witches of Eastwick as Daryl Van Horne**; Lance Henriksen – Pumpkinhead as Ed Harley; Michael Nouri – The Hidden as Det. Tom Beck; Terry O'Quinn – The Stepfather as Jerry Blake; Arnold Schwarzenegger – Predator as Major Alan "Dutch" Schaefer; Peter Weller – RoboCop as Officer Alex Murphy / RoboCop	**Jessica Tandy – Batteries Not Included as Faye Riley**; Nancy Allen – RoboCop as Officer Anne Lewis; Melinda Dillon – Harry and the Hendersons as Nancy Henderson; Lorraine Gary – Jaws: The Revenge as Ellen Brody; Susan Sarandon – The Witches of Eastwick as Jane Spofford; Robin Wright – The Princess Bride as Buttercup
Best Supporting Actor	Best Supporting Actress
**Richard Dawson – The Running Man as Damon Killian**; Robert De Niro – Angel Heart as Louis Cyphre; Robert Englund – A Nightmare on Elm Street 3: Dream Warriors as Freddy Krueger; Barnard Hughes – The Lost Boys as Grandpa; Bill Paxton – Near Dark as Severen; Duncan Regehr – The Monster Squad as Count Dracula	**Anne Ramsey – Throw Momma from the Train as Momma Lift** (posthumous); Lisa Bonet – Angel Heart as Epiphany Proudfoot; Veronica Cartwright – The Witches of Eastwick as Felicia Alden; Louise Fletcher – Flowers in the Attic as Grandmother Olivia; Jenette Goldstein – Near Dark as Diamondback; Dorothy Lamour – Creepshow 2 as Martha Spruce
Best Performance by a Younger Actor	Best Writing
**Kirk Cameron – Like Father Like Son as Dr. Jack Hammond / Chris Hammond**; Scott Curtis – Cameron's Closet as Cameron Lansing; Stephen Dorff – The Gate as Glen; Andre Gower – The Monster Squad as Sean Crenshaw; Corey Haim – The Lost Boys as Sam Emerson; Joshua John Miller – Near Dark as Homer	**Michael Miner and Edward Neumeier – RoboCop**; Alan Parker – Angel Heart; James Dearden – Fatal Attraction; Jim Kouf (as Bob Hunt) – The Hidden; William Goldman – The Princess Bride; Michael Cristofer – The Witches of Eastwick
Best Music	Best Costumes
**Alan Silvestri – Predator**; Christopher Young – Hellraiser; Bruce Broughton – The Monster Squad; John Carpenter – Prince of Darkness; J. Peter Robinson – Return of the Living Dead Part II; John Williams – The Witches of Eastwick	**Phyllis Dalton – The Princess Bride**; Susan Becker – The Lost Boys; Julie Weiss – Masters of the Universe; Michael W. Hoffman and Aggie Lyon – The Monster Squad; Erica Edell Phillips – RoboCop; Robert Blackman – The Running Man
Best Make-up	Best Special Effects
**Rob Bottin and Stephan Dupuis – RoboCop**; Mark Shostrom – Evil Dead II; Rick Baker – Harry and the Hendersons; Bob Keen – Hellraiser; Greg Cannom, Ve Neill, and Steve La Porte – The Lost Boys; Kevin Yagher, Mark Shostrom, and R. Christopher Biggs – A Nightmare on Elm Street 3: Dream Warriors	**Peter Kuran, Phil Tippett, Rob Bottin, and Rocco Gioffre – RoboCop**; Vern Hyde, Doug Beswick, and Tom Sullivan – Evil Dead II; Dennis Muren, Bill George, Harley Jessup, and Kenneth Smith – Innerspace; Richard Edlund – Masters of the Universe; Joel Hynek, Stan Winston, Richard Greenberg, and Robert M. Greenberg – Predator; Michael Lantieri (Industrial Light & Magic (ILM)) – The Witches of Eastwick

=== Special awards ===
==== George Pal Memorial Award ====
- Larry Cohen

==== Life Career Award ====
- Roger Corman

==== President's Award ====
- Mike Jittlov and Richard Kaye – The Wizard of Speed and Time

==== Silver Scroll (Outstanding Achievement) ====
- Gary Goddard – Masters of the Universe

== Films with multiple nominations ==
- RoboCop - 8

== Films with multiple wins ==
- RoboCop - 5
- The Princess Bride - 2
