= Tom Sullivan (special effects artist) =

American special effects artist

- Occupation: Special effects artist
- Years active: 1978–present

Tom Sullivan is an American special effects artist and actor, known primarily for his work on Sam Raimi's Evil Dead trilogy—comprising The Evil Dead (1981), Evil Dead II (1987), and Army of Darkness (1992)—as well as The Fly II (1989). Sullivan was responsible for helping design the Book of the Dead (or the Necronomicon) in The Evil Dead, and drew the illustrations and symbols seen on the pages of the book.

== Career ==
In the mid-1970s, Sullivan met director Sam Raimi because his girlfriend was attending Michigan State University at the same time as Raimi, along with actor Bruce Campbell, screenwriter Scott Spiegel, and producer Robert Tapert. Sullivan bonded with Raimi over their mutual interest in stop-motion animation, special effects, claymation, and puppetry in relation to filmmaking. He joined the crew of Raimi's 1978 short film Within the Woods as a special effects artist. He would later work on The Evil Dead, Raimi's feature-length remake of Within the Woods, as a special makeup effects artist, where he worked with such materials as foam latex and fake blood. For the latter, he used coffee as an added ingredient to the traditional fake blood formula of corn syrup and food coloring. Sullivan helped rig camera mounts and other contraptions for stunts and some of the film's signature shots. He also helped design the Book of the Dead (or the Necronomicon) as it appears onscreen, and drew the pen-and-ink illustrations, glyphs, and sigils seen on the pages of the book.

After the success of The Evil Dead, which was released in 1981, Sullivan worked as an effects artist and animator on its 1987 sequel Evil Dead II. He then worked as a sculptor on the 1989 film The Fly II, before working on special effects for Army of Darkness, the third installment in the original Evil Dead trilogy, released in 1992. Sullivan's work on the Evil Dead series was chronicled in the 2014 documentary film Invaluable, directed by Ryan Meade.

== Selected filmography ==
- Within the Woods (1978)
- The Evil Dead (1981)
- Evil Dead II (1987)
- The Fly II (1989)
- Army of Darkness (1992)
