= Within the Woods =

1979 short film directed by Sam Raimi

- VHS bootleg cover
- Directed by: Sam Raimi
- Written by: Sam Raimi
- Produced by: Rob Tapert
- Starring: Bruce Campbell; Ellen Sandweiss; Mary Valenti; Scott Spiegel
- Cinematography: Tim Philo
- Edited by: Sam Raimi
- Release date: 1979
- Running time: 32 minutes
- Country: United States
- Language: English
- Budget: $1,600

Within the Woods is a 1979 horror short film written, directed and edited by Sam Raimi. Raimi drew inspiration from his earlier short film Clockwork, deciding to produce a proof of concept horror film to help build the interest of potential investors. Raimi cast his friends Bruce Campbell and Ellen Sandweiss as the two protagonists and produced the film for $1,600. Shot on location in a remote cabin in the woods, production was a difficult process because of the low budget. Several of the special effects presented in the film were done in a severely low budget manner, some of which were improvised on set. The film centers around demonic possession and mysterious forces originating from the woods.

Raimi convinced a local theater manager to screen the film alongside The Rocky Horror Picture Show, which sparked minor interest. Initially a meager success, the film screened well to test audiences and became the basis of a larger budget remake titled The Evil Dead (1981). The film was the first in the Evil Dead franchise, and launched the careers of both Bruce Campbell and Sam Raimi. Several of the aesthetic qualities found in Within the Woods later defined Raimi's films.

== Plot ==
Two romantic couples, consisting of four teenagers, decide to spend a weekend together in a remote cabin in the woods. An unseen force stalks and watches the group without their knowledge. Ellen and her boyfriend Bruce enter the woods to have a picnic lunch whilst the other couple, Scotty and Shelly, remain at the cabin, playing Monopoly to pass the time. During their lunch, Bruce tells Ellen they're camping in an Indian burial ground. Ellen is concerned, but Bruce assures her that they will be fine as long as they don't disturb the graves of the dead. While exploring, he finds a dagger in one of the graves. Ignoring his own advice, he takes the dagger with him.

After lunch, Ellen takes a nap. When she awakens, she finds Bruce missing and wanders into the woods to look for him. To her horror, she finds Bruce's dead body, horribly mutilated with apparent knife wounds. She is then startled by a demonic entity hiding in the woods and quickly runs back to the cabin. While fleeing, she is attacked by unseen forces. Running back to the cabin, she screams to be let in and bursts through the door just as the entity closes in. Ellen tells her friends that Bruce has been murdered, but Scotty dismisses the whole thing as a joke and goes to find Bruce. Shelly and Ellen are concerned when Scotty doesn't return right away. Shelly heads out to search for the missing men, but a possessed Bruce assaults and strangles her, eventually stabbing her in the neck and killing her with the dagger that he found, moaning, "Join us."

Ellen encounters her possessed friend and locks herself in another room after grabbing some kitchen knives. Something attempts to enter the room where Ellen is hiding, and she blindly lashes out with a knife, mistakenly stabbing Scotty, who had just returned to the cabin. Ellen is then attacked by the possessed Bruce, but manages to trap him outside, stabbing his hand several times in the process. The bleeding Scotty tells Ellen to look into the cellar for the gun they brought along. While walking down, she trips on a broken step and injures herself. After finding the gun and going back up, she discovers that Scotty had been stabbed to death by the possessed Bruce; when he tries to grab her by the throat with his injured hand, she cuts it off.

Enraged, the possessed Bruce beats her and puts his other hand around her throat. While being strangled, Ellen picks up Bruce's mutilated hand, still clutching the dagger from before, and uses it to stab him. Gushing blood, Bruce lies motionless for a moment but then gets up and resumes his attack. Ellen grabs a wood axe from the stove and hacks at his body, eventually severing all of his limbs. Severely disturbed by the things she has witnessed, Ellen rocks back and forth, muttering to herself. The corpse of Scotty suddenly springs up, before turning towards the oblivious Ellen, ready to attack. The screen then cuts to black, leaving her fate ambiguous.

== Cast ==
- Bruce Campbell as Bruce
- Ellen Sandweiss as Ellen
- Scott Spiegel as Scotty
- Mary Valenti as Shelly

== Production ==
=== Background ===
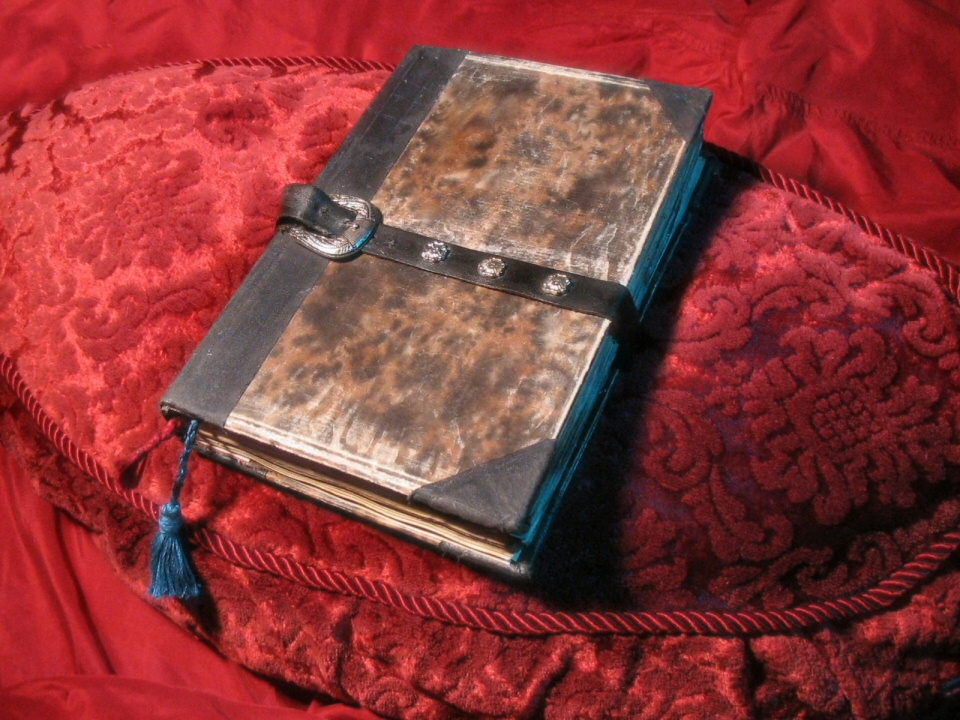
Sam Raimi was inspired by the work of H.P. Lovecraft and the myths surrounding the Necronomicon.

Before the development stages of Within the Woods, Sam Raimi and Bruce Campbell were long-time friends who had grown up together. The duo had produced several low-budget films with Super 8 film during their youth. During the early parts of Raimi's career, he directed films that were mostly classified as comedies, such as Booby Bartenders, Shemp Eats the Moon and The Great Bogus Monkey Pignut Swindle. While those films were described as "goofy" and primitive by members of the cast and crew, Raimi eventually produced the short film It's Murder!, which featured mostly comedic moments. One of the sequences of the film involved a suspenseful moment where a criminal jumped on an unsuspecting individual. Raimi later dismissed the short film, but complimented that scene, stating that it was "the only part of It's Murder! that really worked well.

While working on the film, it inspired Raimi to approach the horror genre with more enthusiasm, leading to the conception of his next short film Clockwork. The film featured a woman being stalked by a demented man, and launched an interest in Raimi to pursue working on more horror films. While both Raimi and Campbell expressed a positive opinion on the genre, they admitted they had little experience with the genre and went to drive-in theaters to research various science fiction and horror films. Raimi developed the motto "the gore the merrier" during these sessions at the drive-in, and quickly developed an interest in films featuring high levels of blood. Raimi gained an appeal in B movie cinema, which led him to want to pursue the production of a more ambitious film for his next project. In order to gain the interest of producers, Raimi and Campbell set out to produce a "prototype" film that would serve as a showcase of their talents. The film would work as a trailer to help promote further cinematic productions.

The prototype film was called Within the Woods. In addition to Raimi's interest in various horror films, one of the main inspirations came in the writing of H. P. Lovecraft, who introduced the concept of the "Book of the Dead" to Raimi. Raimi studied the concept of magical books, in particular the Necronomicon, which formed the basis of the film. Campbell described the film as a combination of "creative writing and ancient history". In order to flesh out of the idea, Raimi came up with a concept where a group of teenagers went into the woods and were attacked by demonic spirits, summoned by the disturbance of an Indian burial ground. The book of the dead concept was not present in the finished film, but appeared extensively in later films by Raimi.

=== Filming ===
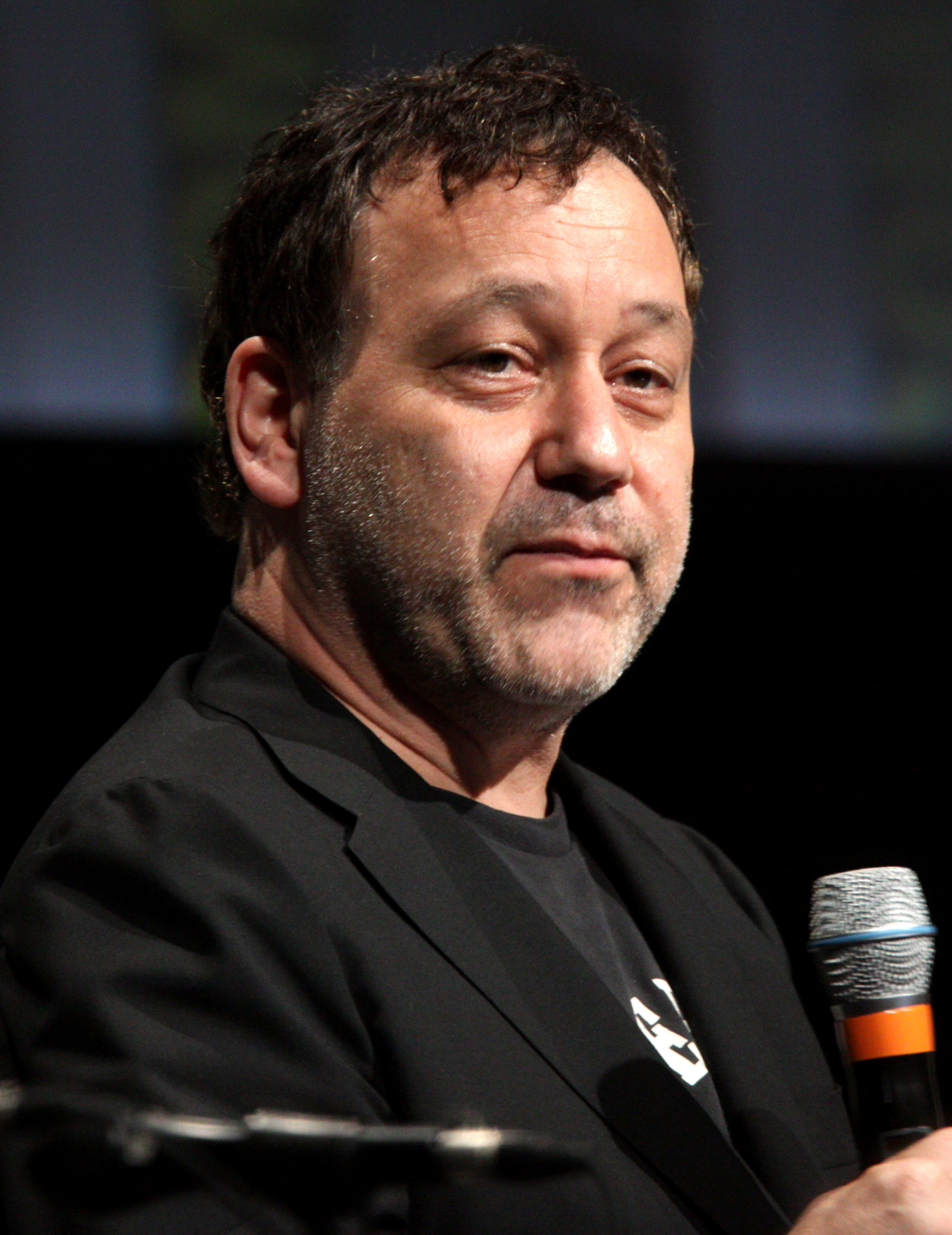
Sam Raimi had to use creative means to shoot several scenes because of budget limitations.

Raimi was able to secure $1,600 to produce the film. Raimi and Campbell collected a group of their friends and family who were interested in participating in the production of the film. The film was primarily shot at a farm house belonging to one of Raimi's friends located in Marshall, Michigan. One of the regular actors involved with Raimi's early short films, Ellen Sandweiss, was cast as the film's protagonist. This decision stemmed from the notion that most horror films at the time involved female leads, who were more enjoyable to watch terrorized. The current boyfriend of Sandweiss was cast as the film's antagonist, a demon who threatens the cast. Campbell was cast as one of the protagonists, though he initially was not familiar with horror cinema and instead identified as a fan of comedies. One of the films that inspired Campbell's interest in the genre was John Carpenter's film Halloween. Another Raimi regular, Scott Spiegel, was also cast as a protagonist based on his prior collaborations with the group.

The effects of the film were entirely low-budget. Nearly every effect in the film was done via things picked up at a make-up and Halloween store located close to where the film was shot. The effects in the film were notably more intricate than the simple ones featured in Raimi's prior projects and contained mutilated bodies, stabbed body parts and demonic possession skin-attachments. Tom Sullivan was one of the primary make-up supervisors on set and he found it difficult working presentable effects out of such low budgets. One notable example involved a chest stabbing rig that had to be attached to Spiegel's chest by straps and duct tape.

Campbell had to sleep wearing his make-up. Because of several scenes that required to be shot in both the day and the night, it was considered easiest to have Campbell sleep all night wearing his make-up, since removing it was too complicated. When Campbell eventually had the effect removed, he was alarmed to notice that his face had actually "changed shape" because of how long the make-up had been applied, though it returned to normal after an extended amount of time. This serves as one of several moments where the film-makers had to be creative to make the film considering the low budget. Other examples include blacking out the windows to make scenes darker and shooting all night long to make the filming schedule. Raimi had to get increasingly inventive during production, often coming up with "bizarre" ideas while shooting scenes. This led to him experimenting with camera moves and camera speeds, "taking it a little further than we had gone before, recording synch-sound at a third slower for a more monstrous effect.

=== Post-production ===
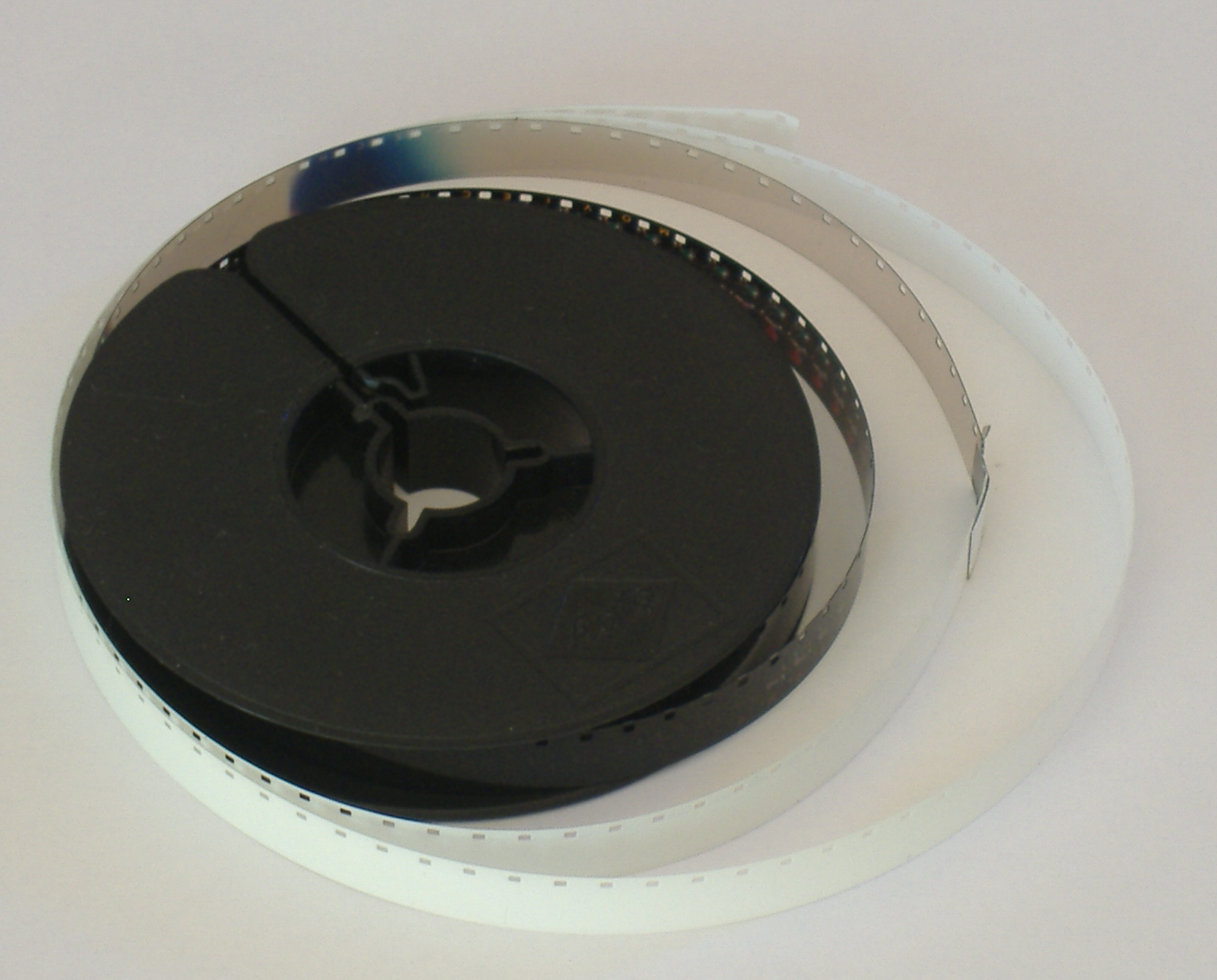
Raimi's decision to blow up the Super 8 mm film to the industry standard of 35mm was handled by a company in San Francisco.

Though production was difficult for many of the actors involved, especially Campbell, the film was eventually completed within acceptable budget limits. Raimi had completed the filming of his "prototype" and sought out to develop and edit the film as cheaply as possible. Though at the time it was unknown how the film was going to be distributed. Raimi had shot the film in the same style as many of his earlier films, with 8 mm film. He intended to blow the footage up after filming to the industry standard of 35mm in order to save money, though Campbell noted that the idea was without precedent. Though the request was "obscure" in nature, a company in San Francisco managed to accommodate the task with little difficulty. At a test screening at a local movie theater, the footage appeared to be mostly acceptable, though further tests showed it to be grainy and difficult to make out.

== Distribution and reception ==
After production, Raimi virtually had no idea how the film was going to be distributed and what would come of it. The main idea behind shooting the film was to make a trailer to show to future investors, but even that was proving to be difficult. Eventually, Raimi got in contact with a manager at a movie theater in Detroit who was "open and flexible". The same theater played The Rocky Horror Picture Show every single week and was open to more unusual cinema. To Raimi's shock, the manager agreed to screen Within the Woods right before a midnight showing of The Rocky Horror Picture Show. The premiere of the film received a positive reception by the audience, and the cast and crew was paid just over $10, all of which was donated to the American Cancer Society. The film, however, was never commercially released.

While critics mostly ignored the locally distributed, low-budget horror film, local The Detroit News critic Michael McWilliams, who attended the film's premiere, wrote that "it will probably never be advertised alongside the glossy, big-budget horror movies of our time, but you won't easily forget a locally produced little film called Within the Woods". He compared the low-budget film to the blockbuster The Amityville Horror, writing that it provided more scares. Tom Sullivan, the make-up supervisor of the film, stated that the film "really packs a punch", and expressed a positive opinion of working on the project.

== Aftermath ==
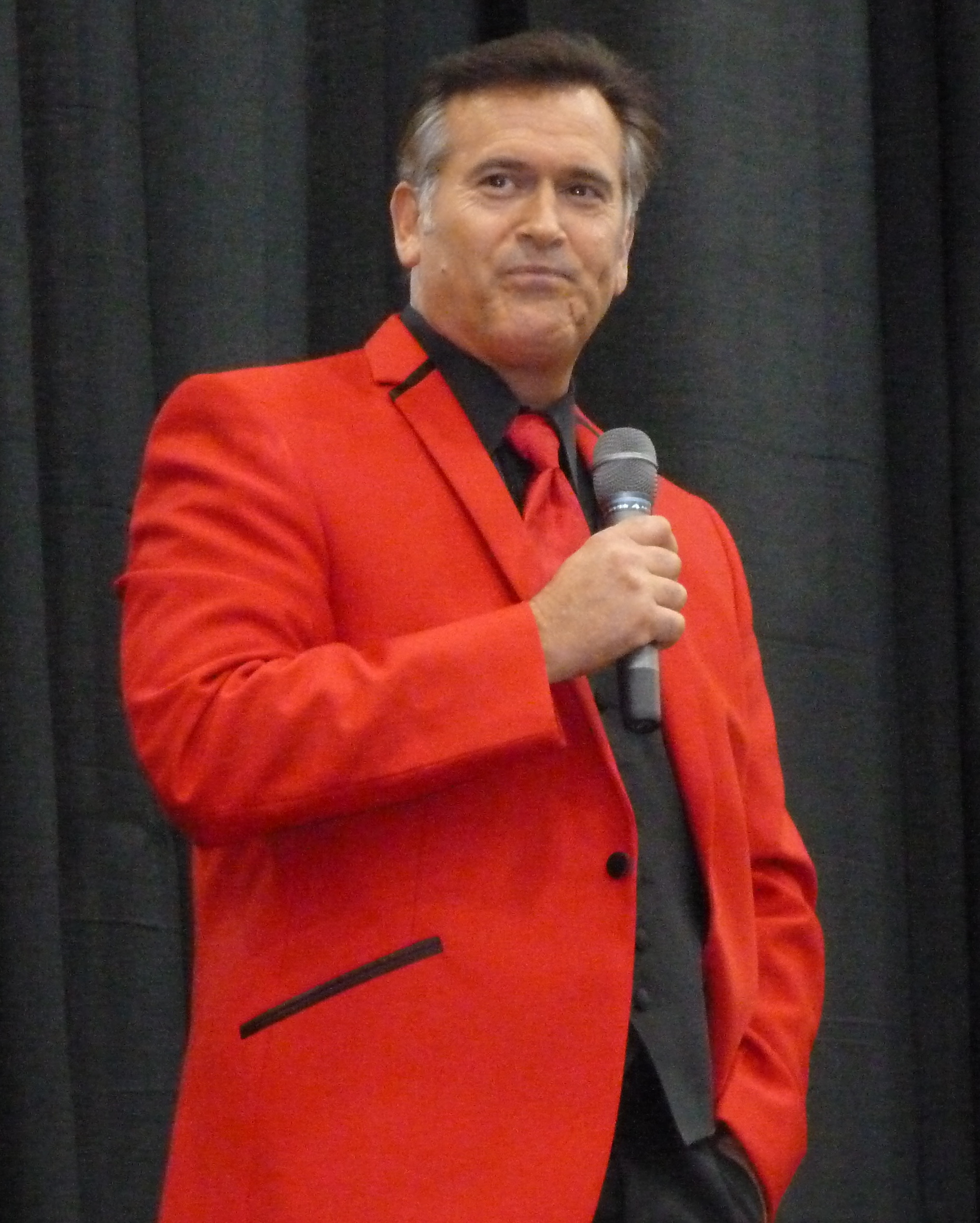
Within the Woods was remade as The Evil Dead, starring Bruce Campbell as Ash Williams.

In order to produce a follow-up picture, Raimi needed nearly $150,000. Raimi approached Phil Gillis, a lawyer to one of his friends, asking if he wanted to invest money into the production of a remake. Gillis was unimpressed with Within the Woods, but offered Raimi legal advice on how to approach further productions. Raimi approached several investors, "begging" for money, and eventually acquired nearly $90,000 of the funds needed and set out to make the movie anyway.

Within the Woods was later retooled by Raimi with a vastly higher production value and a full-length running time as the 1981 film The Evil Dead. The Evil Dead would go on to be the first installment of a film franchise spawning two sequels, Evil Dead II (1987), and Army of Darkness (1992), both of which were directed by Raimi and featured Campbell as Ash Williams. A remake/sequel, known as Evil Dead, was released in 2013 with Raimi and Campbell as producers and creative consultants. In 2015, the Starz television network began airing the comedy horror series Ash vs Evil Dead, which featured Bruce Campbell returning as an older Ash Williams. Another movie in the series, Evil Dead Rise, was released in 2023, with Raimi and Campbell serving as executive producers.

Several aspects of Within the Woods were later presented in future Raimi films, including the use of the "Raimi-cam", a camera rig that creates a fluent flow of camera movement. Other elements, such as graphic imagery, bleak endings, and mutilations, defined many of Raimi's other films. Campbell made cameo appearances in all three of Raimi's Spider-Man films, as well as several other films for Raimi.

Academy Award winning film-making duo the Coen brothers were inspired by Raimi's decision to produce a short film as a trailer, utilizing the concept to produce funding for their debut Blood Simple (1984). The Coen brothers served as editors for The Evil Dead, and developed a friendship with Raimi. The duo has cast Campbell in some of their films such as The Hudsucker Proxy (1994) and Fargo (1996), the former of which was co-written by Raimi.
