= The Evil Dead =

1981 film by Sam Raimi

- 1983 theatrical release poster
- Directed by: Sam Raimi
- Written by: Sam Raimi
- Produced by: Robert G. Tapert
- Starring: Bruce Campbell; Ellen Sandweiss; Richard DeManincor; Betsy Baker; Theresa Tilly
- Cinematography: Tim Philo
- Edited by: Edna Ruth Paul
- Music by: Joe Loduca
- Production company: Renaissance Pictures
- Distributed by: New Line Cinema
- Release dates: October 15, 1981 (Redford Theatre); April 15, 1983 (United States)
- Running time: 85 minutes
- Country: United States
- Language: English
- Budget: $375,000
- Box office: $29.4 million

The Evil Dead is a 1981 American independent supernatural horror film written and directed by Sam Raimi in his feature directorial debut. The film stars Bruce Campbell, Ellen Sandweiss, Richard DeManincor, Betsy Baker and Theresa Tilly as college students vacationing in an isolated cabin in the woods, where they find an audio tape that, when played, releases a legion of demonic entities. Most of the group suffer from demonic possession, forcing its sole survivor, Ash Williams (Campbell), to survive an onslaught of increasingly gory mayhem.

Raimi, Campbell, producer Robert G. Tapert and their friends produced the 1979 short film Within the Woods as a proof of concept to build the interest of potential investors, which secured US$90,000 to begin work on The Evil Dead. Principal photography took place on location in a remote cabin in Morristown, Tennessee, in a filming process that proved extremely uncomfortable for the cast and crew. The film's extensive prosthetic makeup and stop-motion effects were created by artist Tom Sullivan. The completed film had its first, albeit private screening for friends and family at the Redford Theatre in Detroit on October 15, 1981, which attracted the interest of producer Irvin Shapiro, who helped screen the film at the 1982 Cannes Film Festival. Horror author Stephen King gave a rave review of the film, which resulted in New Line Cinema acquiring its distribution rights and giving it a wide theatrical release on April 15, 1983.

The Evil Dead grossed $2.4 million in the United States and $27 million overseas, for a worldwide gross of $29.4 million. Both early and later critical receptions were universally positive; in the years since its release, the film has developed a reputation as one of the most significant cult classics, having been cited among the greatest horror films of all time, and one of the most successful independent films. It launched the careers of Raimi, Tapert, and Campbell, who have continued to collaborate on several films together, such as Raimi's Spider-Man trilogy.

The Evil Dead spawned a media franchise, beginning with two successors written and directed by Raimi, Evil Dead II (1987) and Army of Darkness (1992), a fourth film, Evil Dead (2013), which serves as a standalone sequel, a fifth film, Evil Dead Rise (2023), and a sixth film, Evil Dead Burn (2026), and a follow-up television series, Ash vs Evil Dead, which aired from 2015 to 2018; the franchise also includes video games and comic books. The film's protagonist Ash Williams is considered to be a cultural icon.

== Plot ==
A quintet of Michigan State University students – Ash Williams, his girlfriend Linda, his sister Cheryl, their friend Scott, and Scott's girlfriend Shelly – vacation at a remote cabin in the rural hills of Tennessee. As the group approaches the cabin, they notice the porch swing move on its own, but it stops when Scott grabs the door key. While Cheryl is drawing a picture of an old clock, it stops and she hears a faint voice instructing her to "join us." Her hand becomes possessed, turns pale, and draws a picture of a book with a face on its cover. Although shaken, she does not mention the incident.

When the cellar trapdoor flies open during dinner, Shelly, Linda, and Cheryl stay upstairs as Ash and Scott investigate the cellar. They find the Naturom Demonto, a Sumerian version of the Egyptian Book of the Dead, along with an archaeologist's tape recorder. Scott later plays a tape of incantations that resurrect a demonic entity (The Kandarian Demon). Cheryl yells for Scott to turn off the tape recorder, and a tree branch breaks one of the cabin's windows. Later that evening, an agitated Cheryl heads into the woods to investigate strange noises, and she is attacked and raped by demonically possessed trees. When she escapes and returns to the cabin bruised and anguished, Ash agrees to take her back into town, only to discover that the bridge has been destroyed. They return to the cabin, where Ash learns from the tape that the only way to kill the entity is to dismember the possessed host. As Linda and Shelly play Spades, Cheryl correctly calls out the cards without looking at them, turns into a white-eyed monster, (Note: Later identified as a "Deadite" in Evil Dead II (1987)) and begins levitating. In a raspy voice, she threatens to kill everyone, stabs Linda in the ankle with a pencil, and throws Ash into a shelf. Scott knocks Cheryl into the cellar and detains her inside.

Everyone fights about what to do. Paranoid, Shelly goes to her room but is drawn to look out of her window, where the Kandarian Demon crashes through and attacks her, turning her into a monster too. She attacks Scott before he pushes her into the fireplace and then stabs her in the back with a Sumerian dagger, apparently killing her. When she reanimates, Scott dismembers her with an axe and buries her remains. Shaken, Scott leaves to find a way back to town. He returns shortly after, mortally wounded by the possessed trees, and dies while warning Ash that the trees will not allow their escape. Ash checks on Linda and realizes that she has become possessed. She attacks Ash, who stabs her with the Sumerian dagger. Unwilling to dismember her, he buries her instead. She revives and attacks him, forcing him to decapitate her with a shovel. Her headless body bleeds on his face as it attempts to rape him. He escapes back to the cabin as Linda dies.

Back inside, Ash discovers that Cheryl has escaped the cellar. Scott's dead body also reanimates into a monster. Scott attacks Ash and inadvertently knocks the book close to the fireplace. As Scott and Cheryl attack Ash, he grabs the book and throws it into the fireplace. While the book burns, the zombies freeze and decompose rapidly. Large appendages burst from both corpses, covering Ash in blood. As dawn breaks, he stumbles outside. As he walks away from the cabin, the Kandarian Demon races through the forest and attacks him as he screams in terror.

== Cast ==
- Bruce Campbell as Ash Williams, a young man who goes away with his friends to an old cabin in the woods, where they stumble upon the Naturom Demonto, the Sumerian Book of the Dead
- Ellen Sandweiss as Cheryl Williams, Ash's younger sister
- Richard DeManincor as Scott, a friend of Ash (credited as Hal Delrich)
- Betsy Baker as Linda, Ash's girlfriend
- Theresa Tilly as Shelly, Scotty's girlfriend (credited as Sarah York)
- Sam Raimi as a local fisherman and the voice of the Evil Dead (uncredited)
- Robert G. Tapert as another local fisherman (uncredited)
- Bob Dorian as the voice of Professor Knowby (uncredited)

== Production ==
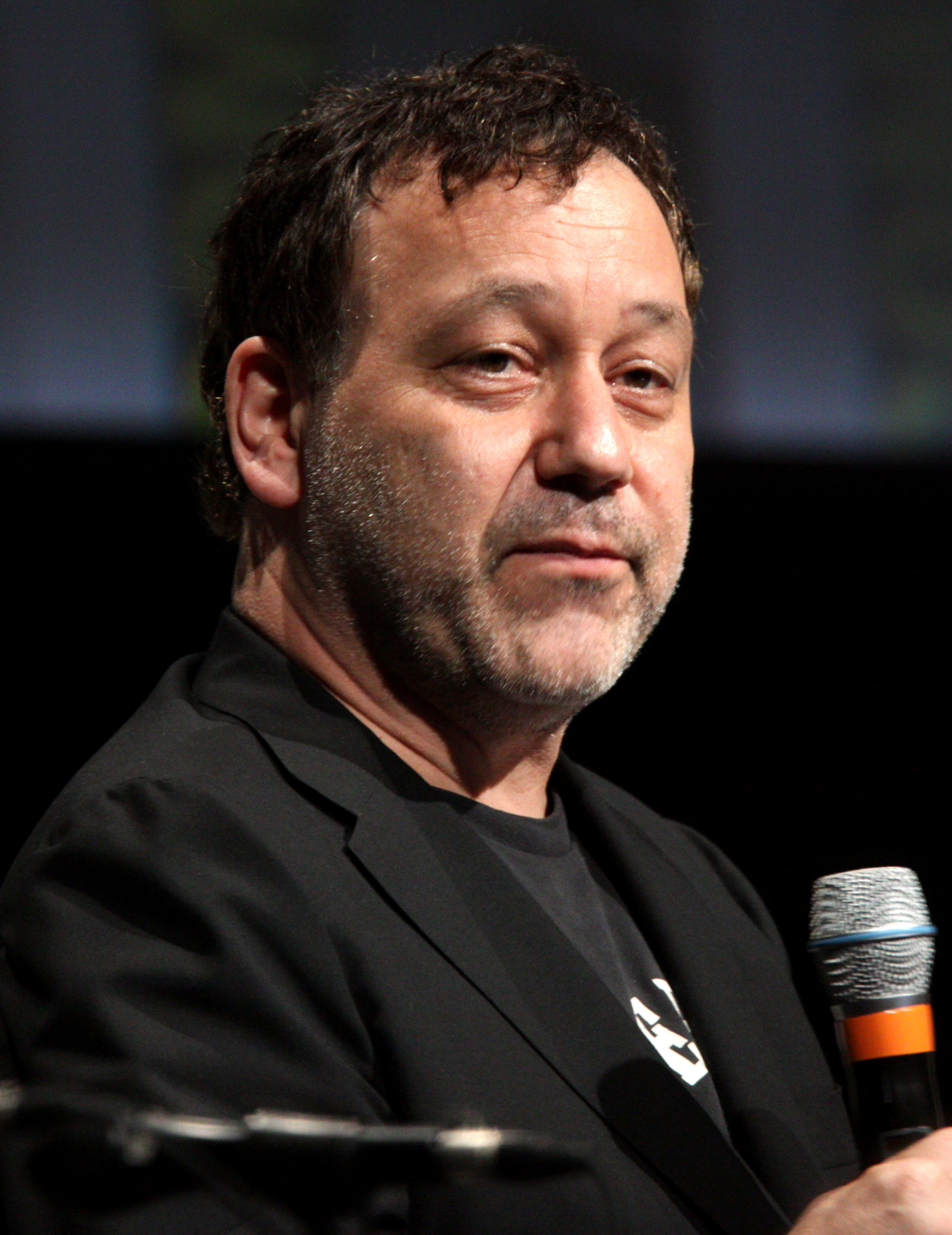
Sam Raimi wrote and directed the short film Within the Woods to generate the interest of investors for The Evil Dead.

=== Background and writing ===
Sam Raimi and Bruce Campbell grew up together and have been friends from an early age. The duo made several low-budget Super 8 mm film projects together. Several were comedies, including Clockwork and It's Murder!. Shooting a suspense scene in It's Murder! inspired them to approach careers in the horror genre; after researching horror cinema at drive-in theaters, Raimi was set on directing a horror film, opting to shoot a proof of concept short film – described by the director as a "prototype" – that would attract the interest of financiers, and use the funds raised to shoot a full-length project. The short film that Raimi created was called Within the Woods, which was produced for $1,600. For The Evil Dead, Raimi required over $100,000.

To generate funds to produce the film, Raimi approached Phil Gillis, a lawyer to one of his friends. Raimi showed him Within the Woods, and although Gillis was not impressed by the short film, he offered Raimi legal advice on how to produce The Evil Dead. With his advice in mind, Raimi asked a variety of people for donations, and even eventually "begged" some. Campbell had to ask several of his own family members, and Raimi asked every individual he thought might be interested. He eventually raised enough money to produce a full-length film, though not the full amount he originally wanted. Raimi said the film cost $375,000.

With enough money to produce the film, Raimi and Campbell set out to make what was then titled Book of the Dead, a name inspired by Raimi's interest in the fiction of H. P. Lovecraft. The film was supposed to be a remake of Within the Woods, with higher production values and a full-length running time. Raimi turned 20 just before shooting began, and he considered the project his "rite of passage".

=== Pre-production and casting ===
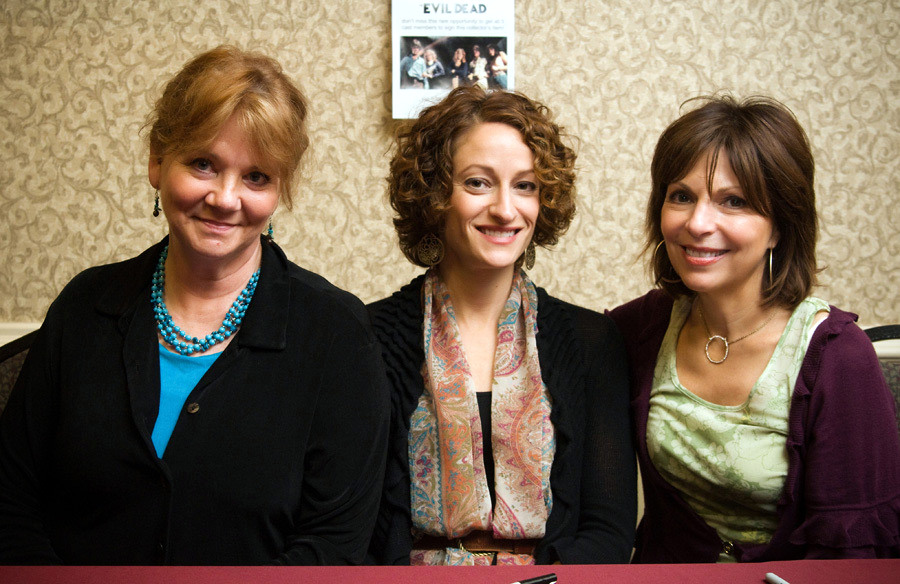
Betsy Baker, Ellen Sandweiss, and Theresa Tilly in 2009

Raimi asked for help and assistance from several of his friends and past collaborators to make The Evil Dead. Campbell offered to produce the film alongside Tapert, and was subsequently cast as Ash Williams, the main character, since his producing responsibilities made him the only actor willing to stay during the production's entirety. To acquire more actors for the project, Raimi put an ad in The Detroit News. Betsy Baker was one of the actresses who responded, and Ellen Sandweiss, who appeared in Within the Woods, was also cast. The crew consisted almost entirely of Raimi and Campbell's friends and family. The special make-up effects artist for Within the Woods, Tom Sullivan, was brought on to compose the effects after expressing a positive reaction to working with Raimi. He helped create many of the film's foam latex and fake blood effects, and added coffee as an extra ingredient to the traditional fake blood formula of corn syrup and food coloring.

Without any formal assistance from location scouts, the cast had to find filming locations on their own. The crew initially attempted to shoot the film in Raimi's hometown of Royal Oak, Michigan, but instead chose Morristown, Tennessee, as it was the only state that expressed enthusiasm for the project. The crew quickly found a remote cabin located several miles away from any other buildings. During pre-production, the 13 crew members had to stay at the cabin, leading to several people sleeping in the same room. The living conditions were notoriously difficult, with several arguments breaking out between crew members.

Steve Frankel was the only carpenter on set, which made him the art direction's sole contributor. For exterior shots, Frankel had to produce several elaborate props with a circular saw. Otherwise, the cabin mostly remained the way it was found during production. The cabin had no plumbing, but phone lines were connected to it.

=== Principal photography ===
The film was made on Kodak 16mm film stock with a rented camera. The inexperienced crew made filming a "comedy of errors". The first day of filming led to them getting lost in the woods during a scene shot on a bridge. Several crew members were injured during the shoot, and because of the cabin's remoteness, securing medical assistance was difficult. One notably gruesome moment on set involved ripping off Baker's eyelashes during removal of her face-mask. Because of the low budget, thick glass contact lenses had to be applied to the actors to achieve the "demonic eyes" effect. The lenses took ten minutes to apply, and could only be left on for about 15 minutes because eyes could not "breathe" with them applied. Campbell later commented that to get the effect of wearing these lenses, they had to put "Tupperware" over their eyes.

Raimi developed a sense of mise en scène, coming up with ideas for scenes at a fast rate. He had drawn several crude illustrations to help him break down the flow of scenes. The crew was surprised when Raimi began using Dutch angles during shots to build atmosphere during scenes. To accommodate Raimi's style of direction, several elaborate, low-budget rigs had to be built, since the crew could not afford a camera dolly. One involved the "vas-o-cam", which relied on a mounted camera that was slid down long wooden platforms to create a more fluid sense of motion.

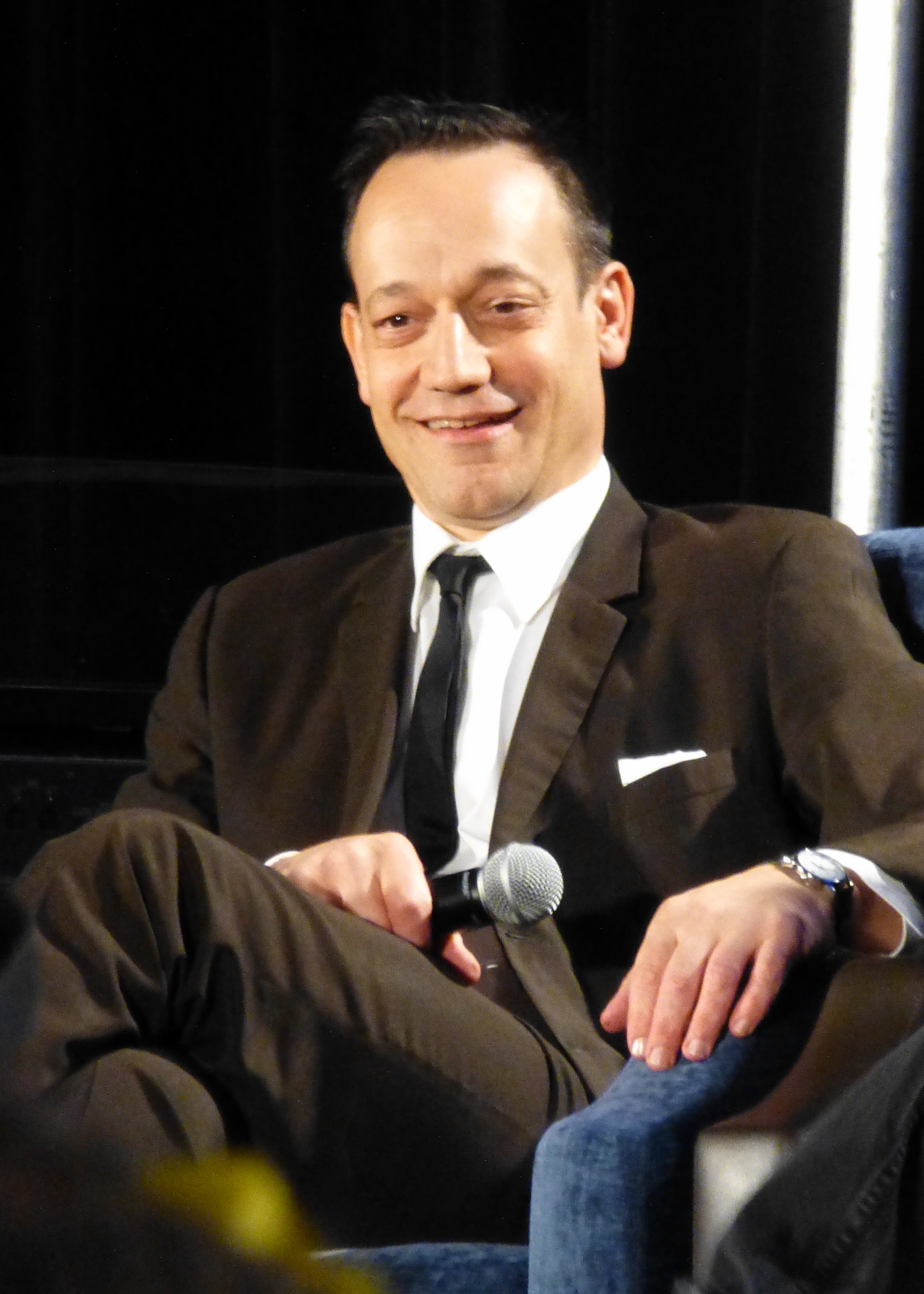
Sam Raimi's brother Ted Raimi was the "fake shemp" in several scenes.

A camera trick used to emulate a Steadicam inexpensively was the "shaky cam", which involved mounting the camera to a piece of wood and having two camera operators sprint around the swamp. During scenes involving the unseen force in the woods watching the characters, Raimi had to run through the woods with the makeshift rig, jumping over logs and stones. This often proved difficult due to mist in the swamp. The film's final scene was shot with the camera mounted to a bike, while it was quickly driven through the cabin to create a seamless long take.

Raimi had been a big fan of The Three Stooges during his youth, which inspired him to use "Fake Shemps" during production. In any scene that required a background shot of a character, he used another actor as a substitute if the original actor was preoccupied. During a close-up involving Richard DeManicor's hand opening a curtain, Raimi used his own hand in the scene since it was more convenient. His brother Ted Raimi was used as a "Fake Shemp" in many scenes when the original actor was either busy or preoccupied.

Raimi enjoyed "torturing" his actors. Raimi believed that to capture pain and anger in his actors, he had to abuse them a little at times, saying, "if everyone was in extreme pain and misery, that would translate into a horror". Producer Robert Tapert agreed with Raimi, commenting that he "enjoyed when an actor bleeds." While shooting a scene with Campbell running down a hill, Campbell tripped and injured his leg. Raimi enjoyed poking Campbell's injury with a stick he found in the woods. Because of the copious amounts of blood in the film, the crew produced gallons of fake blood with Karo corn syrup. It took Campbell hours to remove the sticky substance from himself. Several actors had inadvertently been stabbed or thrown into objects during production. During the last few days on set, the conditions had become so extreme the crew began burning furniture to stay warm. Since at that point only exterior shots needed to be filmed, they burned nearly every piece of furniture left. Several actors went days without showering, and because of the freezing conditions, several caught colds and other illnesses. Campbell later described the filming process as nearly "twelve weeks of mirthless exercise in agony", though he allowed that he did manage to have fun while on set. On January 23, 1980, filming was finished and almost every crew member left the set to return home, with Campbell staying with Raimi. While looking over the footage that had been shot, Raimi discovered that a few pick-ups were required to fill in missing shots. Four days of re-shoots were then done to complete the film. The final moment involved Campbell having "monster-guts" splattered on him in the basement.

Summing up the production decades later, Campbell remarked: "It's low-budget, it's got rough edges," but even so, "there are parts of that movie that are visually stunning."

=== Editing ===
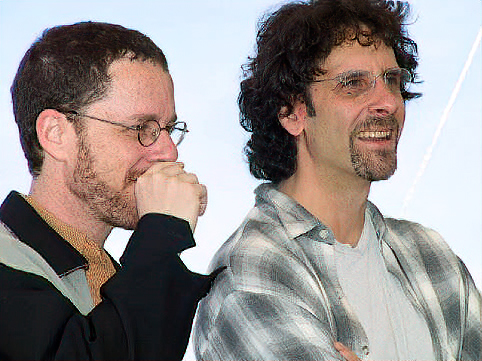
Joel Coen (pictured right) helped to edit the film.

After the extensive filming process, Raimi had a "mountain of footage" that he had to put together. He chose a Detroit editing association, where he met Edna Paul, to cut the film with Joel Coen working as her assistant. Paul edited a majority of the film, although Coen edited the shed sequence. Coen had been inspired by Raimi's Within the Woods and liked the idea of producing a prototype film to help build the interest of investors. Coen used the concept to help make Blood Simple with his brother Ethan, and he and Raimi became friends following the editing process.

The film's first cut ran at around 117 minutes, which Campbell called an impressive achievement in light of the 65-minute length of the screenplay. The cut scenes were to focus on the main character's lamentation of not being able to save the victims from their deaths, but was edited down to make the film less "grim and depressing" and to be a more marketable 85 minutes. Raimi was inspired by the fact that Brian De Palma was editing his own film Blow Out with John Travolta at the same sound facility. One of the most intricate moments during editing was the stop-motion animation sequence where the corpses "melted", which took hours to cut properly. The film had unique sounds that required extensive recording from the crew. Several sounds were not recorded properly during shooting, which meant the effects had to be redone in the editing rooms. Dead chickens were stabbed to replicate the sounds of mutilated flesh, and Campbell had to scream into a microphone for several hours.

Much like Within the Woods, The Evil Dead needed to be blown up to 35mm, the industry standard, to be played at movie theaters. The relatively large budget made this a much simpler process with The Evil Dead than it had been with the short film.

== Promotion and distribution rights ==
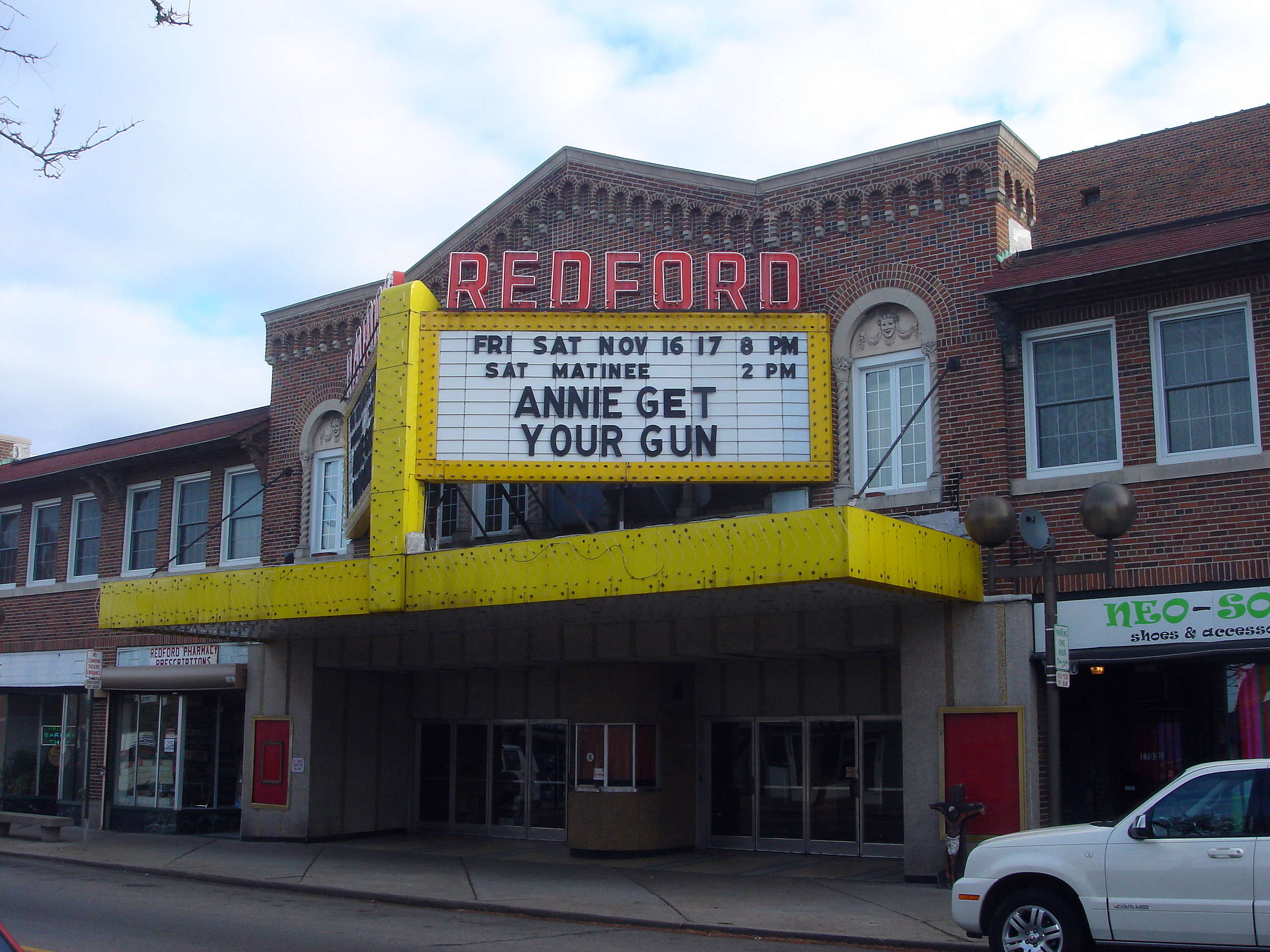
The Evil Dead premiered at the Redford Theatre because Bruce Campbell watched films there as a child.

With the film completed, Raimi and the crew decided to celebrate with a "big premiere". They chose to screen the film at Detroit's Redford Theatre, which Campbell had often visited as a child. Raimi opted to have the most theatrical premiere possible, using custom tickets and wind tracks set in the theater, and ordering ambulances outside the theater to build atmosphere. The premiere setup was inspired by horror director William Castle, who would often attempt to scare his audiences by using gimmicks. Local turnout for the premiere exceeded the cast's expectations, with a thousand patrons showing up. The audiences responded enthusiastically to the premiere, which led to Raimi's idea of "touring" the film to build hype.

Raimi showed the film to anyone willing to watch it, booking meetings with distribution agents and anyone with experience in the film industry. Eventually Raimi came across Irvin Shapiro, the man who was responsible for the distribution of George A. Romero's Night of the Living Dead and other famous horror films. Upon first viewing the film, he joked that while it "wasn't Gone with the Wind", it had commercial potential, and he expressed an interest in distributing it. It was his idea not to use the then-title Book of the Dead, because he thought it made the film sound boring. Raimi brainstormed several ideas, eventually going with The Evil Dead, deemed the "least worst" title. Shapiro also advised distributing the film worldwide to garner a larger income, though it required a further financial investment by Raimi, who managed to scrape together what little money he had.

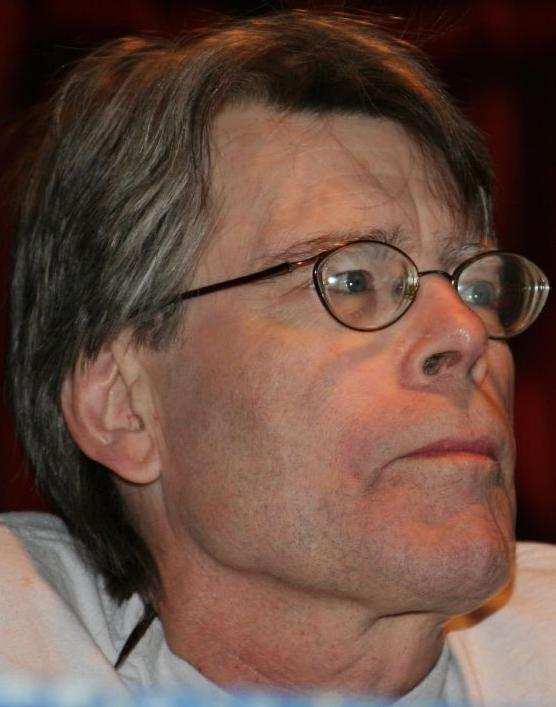
Stephen King cited The Evil Dead as one of his favorite films, which brought the interest of New Line Cinema.

Shapiro was a founder of the Cannes Film Festival, and allowed Raimi to screen the film at the 1982 festival out of competition. Stephen King was present at its screening and gave the film a rave review. USA Today released an article about King's favorite horror films; the author cited The Evil Dead as his fifth favorite film of the genre. The film severely affected King, who commented that while watching the film at Cannes, he was "registering things [he] had never seen in a movie before". He became one of the film's largest supporters during the early efforts to find a distributor, eventually describing it as the "most ferociously original film of the year", a quote used in the film's promotional pieces. King's comments attracted the interest of critics, who otherwise would likely have dismissed the low-budget thriller.

The film's press attracted the attention of British film distribution agent Stephen Woolley. Though he considered the film a big risk, Woolley decided to take on the job of releasing the film in the United Kingdom. The film was promoted in an unconventional manner for a film of its budget, receiving marketing on par with that of larger budget films. Dozens of promotional pieces, including film posters and trailers, were showcased in the UK, heavy promotion rarely expended on such a low-budget film. Woolley was impressed by Raimi, whom he called "charming", and was an admirer of the film, which led to his taking more risks with the film's promotion than he normally would have.

Fangoria started covering the film in late 1982, writing several articles about the film's long production history. Early critical reception at the time was very positive, and along with Fangoria, King and Shapiro's approval, the film generated an impressive amount of interest before its commercial premiere. New Line Cinema, one of the distributors interested in the film, negotiated an agreement to distribute it domestically. The film had several "sneak previews" before its commercial release, including screenings in New York and Detroit. Audience reception at both screenings was widely enthusiastic, and interest was built for the film to such an extent that wider distribution was planned. New Line Cinema wrote Raimi a check large enough to pay off all the investors, and decided to release the film in an unusual manner: simultaneously into both cinemas and onto VHS, with substantial domestic promotion.

== Release ==
=== Theatrical ===
Because of its large promotional campaign, the film performed above expectations at the box office. However, the initial domestic gross was described as "disappointing." The movie opened in 15 theaters and grossed $108,000 in its opening weekend. Word of mouth later spread, and the film became a "sleeper hit". It grossed $2,400,000 domestically, nearly eight times its production budget. Sources differ as to whether it grossed $261,944 overseas, for a worldwide gross of $2,661,944, or $27 million overseas, for a worldwide gross of $29.4 million. Raimi said in 1990 that the film "did very well overseas and did very poorly domestically" and that its investors earned a return of "about five times their initial investment."

=== Rating ===
The film's release was met with controversy, as Raimi had made the film as gruesome as possible with neither interest in nor fear of censorship. Writer Bruce Kawin described The Evil Dead as one of the most notorious splatter films of its day, along with Cannibal Holocaust and I Spit on Your Grave.

In the UK, the film was trimmed by 49 seconds before it was granted an X certificate for cinema release. This censored version was also released on home video; at the time there was no requirement that films had to be classified for video release. An anti-media organization campaign led to the film being branded a "video nasty". When the Video Recordings Act was passed in 1984, the video version was banned. In 1990, an additional 66 seconds were cut from the already censored version, earning the film an 18 certificate for home video release. Finally, in 2000, the uncut version received an 18 certificate for both cinema and home video.

In the US, the film received an X rating. Films with this label were quite violent and disturbing, and the rating was often held by pornographic films. The film has since been re-rated NC-17 for “substantial graphic horror violence and gore”, though many recent home media releases have been released without a rating. Sony's 2026 4K UHD Blu-ray release now displays the rating.

The film was, and is still, banned either theatrically or on video in some countries.

=== Home media release ===
The first VHS release of The Evil Dead was released by Thorn EMI in 1983, and Thorn's successor company HBO/Cannon Video later repackaged the film. Former HBO Video's partner Congress Video, a company notable for public domain films, issued its version in 1989.

In its first week of video release, the film made £100,000 in the UK. It quickly became that week's bestselling video release, and later became the year's bestselling video in the UK, out-grossing large-budget horror releases such as The Shining. Its impressive European performance was chalked up to its heavy promotion there and the more open-minded nature of European audiences.

The resurgence of The Evil Dead in the home-video market came through two companies that restored the film from its negatives and issued special editions in 1998: Anchor Bay Entertainment on VHS, and Elite Entertainment on LaserDisc. Anchor Bay was responsible for the film's first DVD release on January 19, 1999, along with Elite releasing the special collector's edition DVD on March 30, 1999, and between them, Elite and Anchor Bay have released six different DVD versions of The Evil Dead, most notably the 2002 "Book Of The Dead" edition, packaged in a latex replica of the Necronomicon sculpted by Tom Sullivan and the 2007 three disc "Ultimate Edition" which contained the widescreen and original full frame versions of the movie. The film's high-definition debut was in a 2010 Blu-ray.

Lionsgate Films released a 4K Ultra HD Blu-ray edition of The Evil Dead on October 9, 2018. In lieu of the film's 45th anniversary and coinciding with the release of the standalone installment Evil Dead Burn, Sony Pictures Home Entertainment reissued a 4K Ultra HD Blu-ray steelbook of The Evil Dead on July 7, 2026.

== Reception ==
=== Critical response ===
Upon its release, contemporary critical opinion was largely positive. Bob Martin, editor of Fangoria, reviewed the film before its formal premiere and proclaimed that it "might be the exception to the usual run of low-budget horror films". He followed up on this praise after the film's premiere, stating: "Since I started editing this magazine, I have not seen any new film that I could recommend to our readers with more confidence that it would be loved, embraced and hailed as a new milestone in graphic horror". The Los Angeles Times called the film an "instant classic", proclaiming it as "probably the grisliest well-made movie ever." In a 1982 review, staff from Variety wrote that the film "emerges as the ne plus ultra of low-budget gore and shock effect", commenting that the "powerful" and inventive camerawork was key to creating a sense of dread.

British press for the film was positive; Kim Newman of Monthly Film Bulletin, Richard Cook of NME and Julian Petley of Film and Filming all gave the film good reviews during its early release. Petley and Cook compared the film to other contemporary horror films, writing that the film expressed more imagination and "youthful enthusiasm" than an average horror film. Cook described the camera work by Raimi as "audacious", stating that the film's visceral nature was greatly helped by the style of direction. Woolley, Newman and several critics complimented the film for its unexpected use of black comedy, which elevated the film above its genre's potential trappings. All three critics compared the film to the surrealistic work of Georges Franju and Jean Cocteau, noting the cinephilic references to Cocteau's film Orpheus. Writer Lynn Schofield Clark in her novel From Angels to Aliens compared the film to better-known horror films such as The Exorcist and The Omen, citing it as a key supernatural thriller.

=== Later response ===
On the review aggregator website Rotten Tomatoes, 86% of 85 critics' reviews are positive, with an average rating of 7.70/10. The website's consensus reads: "So scrappy that it feels as illicit as a book found in the woods, The Evil Dead is a stomach-churning achievement in bad taste that marks a startling debut for wunderkind Sam Raimi." Metacritic, which uses a weighted average, assigned the film a score of 71 out of 100, based on 11 critics, indicating "generally favorable" reviews. Empire stated the film's "reputation was deserved", writing that the film was impressive considering its low budget and the cast's inexperience. He commented that the film successfully blended the "bizarre" combination of Night of the Living Dead, The Texas Chain Saw Massacre and The Three Stooges. A reviewer for Film4 rated The Evil Dead four-and-a-half stars out of five, musing that the film was "energetic, original and icky" and concluding that Raimi's "splat-stick debut is a tight little horror classic that deserves its cult reputation, despite the best efforts of the censors."

Slant's Ed Gonzales compared the film to Dario Argento's work, citing Raimi's "unnerving wide angle work" as an important factor to the film's atmosphere. He mused that Raimi possessed an "almost unreal ability to suggest the presence of intangible evil", which was what prevented the movie from being "B-movie schlock". BBC critic Martyn Glanville awarded the film four stars out of five, writing that for Raimi, it served as a better debut film than Tobe Hooper's The Texas Chain Saw Massacre or Wes Craven's The Last House on the Left. Glanville noted that other than the "ill-advised trees-that-rape scene", the film is "one of the great modern horror films, and even more impressive when one considers its modest production values."

Filmcritic.com's Christopher Null gave the film the same rating as Glanville, writing that "Raimi's biggest grossout is schlock horror done the right way" and comparing it to Romero's Night of the Living Dead in its ability to create stark atmosphere. Chicago Reader writer Pat Graham commented that the film featured several "clever" turns on the standard horror formula, adding that Raimi's "anything-for-an-effect enthusiasm pays off in lots of formally inventive bits." Time Out critic Stephen Garrett, referred to the make-up effects in the climax as "amazing", and commented that although the film was light on character development, it "blends comic fantasy" with "atmospheric horror ... to impressive effect". The same site later cited the film as the 41st greatest horror movie ever made. Phelim O'Neill of The Guardian combined The Evil Dead and its sequel Evil Dead II and listed them as the 23rd best horror film ever made, announcing that the former film "stands above its mostly forgotten peers in the 80s horror boom." Don Summer, in his book Horror Movie Freak, and writer Kate Egan have both cited the film as a horror classic.

J.C. Maçek III of PopMatters said: "What is unquestionable is that the Raimis and their pals created a monster in The Evil Dead. It started as a disastrous failure to obtain a big break with a too long, too perilous shoot (note Campbell's changing hairstyle in the various scenes of the one-day plot). The film went through name changes and bannings only to survive as not only 'the ultimate experience in grueling horror' but as an oft-imitated and cashed-in-on classic, with 30 years of positive reviews to prove it."

== Aftermath ==
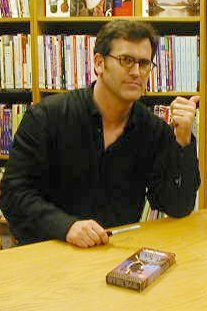
Bruce Campbell at a fan convention, signing a VHS copy of The Evil Dead.

While The Evil Dead received favorable critical comment when it was initially released, it failed to establish Raimi's reputation. It was, however, a box-office success, which led to Campbell and Raimi teaming up again for the release of another movie. Joel Coen and his brother Ethan had collaborated as directors and released the film Blood Simple, to critical acclaim. According to Campbell, Ethan, then an accountant, expressed surprise when the duo succeeded. The Coen brothers and Raimi collaborated on a screenplay, which was released shortly after The Evil Dead. The film, Crimewave, was a box-office failure. The film's production was a "disaster", according to Campbell, who stated that "missteps" like Crimewave usually lead to the end of a director's career. Other people involved with the film expressed similar disappointment with the project. Fortunately, Raimi had the studio support to make a sequel to The Evil Dead, which he initially decided to make out of desperation.

=== Sequels and television series ===
The Evil Dead was followed by a series of sequels and a television series. The franchise is noted from attracting attention for each sequel featuring more comedic qualities than the last, progressing into "weirder" territory with each film. Released in 1987, the black comedy-horror film Evil Dead II was a minor box-office success. It received general acclaim from critics, and is often considered to be superior to the first film. This was followed by Army of Darkness, a comedy fantasy-horror film released in 1992. At that time, Raimi had become a successful director, attracting Hollywood's interest. His superhero film Darkman (1990) was another box-office success, which led to an increased budget for Army of Darkness. Army of Darkness had 22.8 times the budget of the original Evil Dead, though it was not considered to be a box-office success like its two predecessors. It was met with mostly positive critical reception. After any additional installments suffered through development hell, a supernatural-horror soft reboot titled Evil Dead was released in 2013, featuring Jane Levy as the main character Mia Allen. Directed and co-written by Fede Álvarez, the film was produced by Raimi and Campbell. The film, which was a departure from the humor of the previous two films, was considered to be a box office success and was praised for its dark and bloody story. While various projects going through varying stages of development, a continuation was released as a television series titled, Ash vs. Evil Dead. Created and executive produced by Sam Raimi, the series aired from 2015 to 2018.

After further film installments once again remained in development hell for a number of years, a fifth feature film titled Evil Dead Rise was announced to be in development. The project began filming in June 2021, with Irish filmmaker Lee Cronin serving as writer/director. Though Campbell reprised his role as Ashley "Ash" J. Williams in each of the proceeding sequels, he did not appear in the film. The film was released theatrically on April 21, 2023, by Warner Bros. Pictures. A sixth feature film titled Evil Dead Burn was released on July 10, 2026.

==== Foreign market ====
Unofficial sequels were made in Italy, where the film was known as La Casa ("The House"). Produced by Joe D'Amato's Filmirage, two mostly unrelated films were released and marketed as sequels to Evil Dead II: Umberto Lenzi's La Casa 3: Ghosthouse and La Casa 4: Witchery starring Linda Blair and David Hasselhoff. The final film was released in 1990 and titled, La Casa 5: Beyond Darkness. The film House II: The Second Story was reissued and retitled in Italy as La Casa 6; followed by The Horror Show which was released in Italy as La Casa 7.

In 2008, an unofficial remake was also produced in India under the title Bach Ke Zara.

=== Legacy ===
The original Evil Dead trilogy of films has been recognized as one of the most successful cult film series in history. David Lavery, in his book The Essential Cult TV Reader, surmised that Campbell's "career is a practical guide to becoming a cult idol". The film launched the careers of Raimi and Campbell, who have since collaborated frequently. Raimi has worked with Campbell in virtually all of his films since, and Campbell has appeared in cameo roles in all three of Raimi's Spider-Man films (as well as a very brief appearance at the end of Darkman), which have become some of the highest-grossing films in history. Though it has often been considered an odd choice for Raimi, a director known for his violent horror films, to direct a family-friendly franchise, the hiring was mostly inspired by Raimi's passion for comic books as a child. Raimi returned to the horror-comedy genre in 2009 with Drag Me to Hell.

Critics have often compared Campbell's later performances to his role in Evil Dead, which has been called his defining role. Campbell's performance as Ash has been compared to roles ranging from his performance of Elvis Presley in the film Bubba Ho-tep to the bigamous demon in The X-Files episode "Terms of Endearment". Campbell's fan base gradually developed after the release of Evil Dead II and his short-lived series The Adventures of Brisco County, Jr.. He is a regular favorite at most fan conventions and often draws sold-out auditoriums at his public appearances. The Evil Dead developed a substantial cult following throughout the years, and has often been cited as a defining cult classic.

The Evil Dead has spawned a media franchise. A video game adaptation of the same name was released for the Commodore 64 in 1984, as was a trilogy of survival horror games in the 1990s and early 2000s: Evil Dead: Hail to the King, Evil Dead: A Fistful of Boomstick and Evil Dead: Regeneration. Ted Raimi did voices for the trilogy, and Campbell returned as the voice of Ash. The character Ash became the main character of a comic book franchise. Ash has fought both Freddy Krueger and Jason Voorhees in the Freddy vs. Jason vs. Ash series, Herbert West in Army of Darkness vs. Re-Animator, zombie versions of the Marvel Comics superheroes in Marvel Zombies vs. The Army of Darkness, and has even saved the life of a fictional Barack Obama in Army of Darkness: Ash Saves Obama. In January 2008, Dark Horse Comics began releasing a four-part monthly comic book mini-series, written by Mark Verheiden and drawn by John Bolton, based on The Evil Dead. The film has also inspired a stage musical, Evil Dead: The Musical, which was produced with the permission of Raimi and Campbell. The musical has run on and off since its inception in 2003.

After the film was released, many people began to trespass onto the filming location in Morristown. In 1982, the cabin was burned down by the owners, who were tired of the attention. Although the cabin is now gone, the chimney remains, from which many people now take stones when they trespass onto the location.

In 2022, a video game adaptation of the series called Evil Dead: The Game was released.

In 2021, heavy metal band Ice Nine Kills released a song titled "Ex-Mørtis" on their album The Silver Scream 2: Welcome to Horrorwood, which is composed of songs each explicitly linked to specific horror media per the album's booklet of liner notes; "Ex-Mørtis" is stated to be inspired by The Evil Dead.

== See also ==
- List of cult films

== Bibliography ==
- Clark, Lynn Schofield (2005). From Angels to Aliens: Teenagers, the Media, and the Supernatural. Oxford University Press. ISBN 978-0-19-530023-9.
- Becker, Josh (2006). The Complete Guide to Low-Budget Feature Filmmaking. Point Blank. ISBN 978-0-8095-5690-8.
- Campbell, Bruce (2002). If Chins Could Kill: Confessions of a B Movie Actor. L.A. Weekly Books. ISBN 978-0-312-29145-7.
- Chibnall, Steve (2001). British Horror Cinema. Routledge. ISBN 978-0-415-23004-9.
- Collings, Michael R. (2007). Scaring Us to Death: The Impact of Stephen King on Popular Culture. Borgo Press. ISBN 978-0-930261-37-5.
- Collings, Michael R. (2008). The Films of Stephen King: From Carrie to Secret Window. Palgrave Macmillan. ISBN 978-0-230-60131-4.
- Dixon, Wheeler Winston (2010). A History of Horror. Rutgers University Press. ISBN 978-0-8135-4796-1.
- Egan, Kate (2011). The Evil Dead. Wallflower Press. ISBN 978-1-906660-34-5.
- Finney, Angus (1997). The Egos Have Landed: Rise and Fall of Palace Pictures. Arrow Books Ltd. ISBN 978-0-7493-1946-5.
- Hantke, Steffen (2004). Horror Film: Creating and Marketing Fear. University Press of Mississippi. ISBN 978-1-57806-692-6.
- Harris, J. P. (2002). Time Capsule: Reviews of Horror, Science Fiction and Fantasy Films and TV Shows from 1987 to 1991. iUniverse. ISBN 978-0-595-21336-8.
- Kawin, Bruce F. (2012). Horror and the Horror Film. New Perspectives on World Cinema. Anthem Press. ISBN 978-0-85728-450-1.
- Kay, Glenn (2008). Zombie Movies: The Ultimate Guide. Chicago Review Press. ISBN 978-1-55652-770-8.
- Kenneth Muir, John (2004). The Unseen Force: the Films of Sam Raimi. Applause Theatre & Cinema Books. ISBN 978-1-55783-607-6.
- Kenneth Muir, John (2007). Horror Films of the 1980s. Virgin Books. ISBN 978-0-7864-2821-2.
- Kerekes, David (2000). See No Evil: Banned Films and Video Controversy. Critical Vision. ISBN 978-1-900486-10-1.
- Konow, David (2012). Reel Terror: The Scary, Bloody, Gory, Hundred-Year History of Classic Horror Films. St. Martin's Press. ISBN 978-0-312-66883-9.
- Lamberson, Gregory (2008). Cheap Scares!: Low Budget Horror Filmmakers Share Their Secrets. McFarland. ISBN 978-0-7864-3706-1.
- Lavery, David (2009). The Essential Cult TV Reader. Essential Readers in Contemporary Media. The University Press of Kentucky. ISBN 978-0-8131-2568-8.
- Lowry, Brian (1995). The Truth Is Out There: The Official Guide to the X-Files. Harper Prism 5. ISBN 978-0-06-105330-6.
- Newman, Kim (2011). Nightmare Movies: Horror on Screen Since the 1960s. Bloomsbury Publishing. ISBN 978-1-4088-0503-9.
- Paul, Louis (2007). Tales from the Cult Film Trenches: Interviews with 36 Actors from Horror, Science Fiction and Exploitation Cinema. McFarland & Company. ISBN 978-0-7864-2994-3.
- Pooley, Eric (1987). Warped in America: The Dark Visions of Joel and Ethan Coen. New York. ISBN 978-0-7864-2821-2.
- Robson, Eddie (2010). Coen Brothers. Virgin Film Series. Virgin Books. ISBN 978-0-7535-1268-5.
- Staiger, Janet (2005). Media Reception Studies. NYU Press. ISBN 978-0-8147-8135-7.
- Summer, Don (2007). Horror Movie Freak. Krause Publications. ISBN 978-1440208249.
- Verderame, Lorenzo (2020). "Evil from an Ancient Past and the Archaeology of the Beyond: An Analysis of the Movies The Exorcist (1973) and The Evil Dead (1981)". In Verderame, Lorenzo; Garcia-Ventura, Agnès (eds.). Receptions of the Ancient Near East in Popular Culture and Beyond. Atlanta: Lockwood Press. pp. 159–179. ISBN 9781948488259.
- Warren, Bill (2000). The Evil Dead Companion. Titan Books. ISBN 1-84023-187-4.
- Xavier, Mendik (2004). Alternative Europe: Eurotrash and Exploitation Cinema Since 1945. Wallflower Press. ISBN 978-1-903364-93-2.
- Žižek, Slavoj (2000). The Ticklish Subject: The Absent Centre of Political Ontology. Verso. ISBN 978-1-85984-291-1.
