= Mark Shostrom =

Hong Kong-born American makeup artist

- Born: Mark Allen Shostrom; May 13, 1956 (age 69)
- Occupation: Make-up artist
- Website: http://markshostrom.com/

Mark Shostrom (born May 13, 1956) is a Hong Kong-born American special makeup effects artist for the film industry.

== Background ==
Shostrom grew up in Hong Kong during the 1970s. He became interested in makeup after seeing The Bride of Frankenstein (1935). Shostrom was encouraged to pursue makeup as a 13-year-old boy after befriending Evelyn Karloff, widow of Boris Karloff, the actor who portrayed the original Frankenstein's monster.

He is the winner of three Emmy Awards (out of four nominations) and has been nominated for four Saturn Awards by the Academy of Science Fiction, Fantasy and Horror Films. Shostrom designed and created special makeup effects for numerous cult horror films of the 1980s and 1990s, in particular the film series and sequels of A Nightmare on Elm Street, Phantasm and Evil Dead II. He also contributed special makeup effects to music videos for "Pet Sematary" The Ramones and Nine Inch Nails.

== Partial filmography ==
- Android (1982)
- The Beastmaster (1982)
- Videodrome (1983)
- A Nightmare on Elm Street (1984)
- The Mutilator (1984)
- A Nightmare on Elm Street 2: Freddy's Revenge (1985)
- The Boys Next Door (1985)
- From Beyond (1986)
- A Nightmare on Elm Street 3: Dream Warriors (1987)
- Evil Dead II (1987)
- John Carpenter's Prince of Darkness (1987)
- Poltergeist III (1988)
- Phantasm II (1988)
- Deep Star Six (1989)
- Dick Tracy (1990)
- Star Trek: Deep Space Nine (1993)
- The X Files (TV series) (1993)
- Best of the Best 2 (1993)
- Phantasm III (1994)
- Star Trek: Voyager (1995–1997)
- Men in Black (1997)
- The Devil's Advocate (1997)
- The X Files (1998)
- Jane Austen's Mafia! (1998)
- Buffy the Vampire Slayer (1998–2003)
- Charmed (1998)
- The General's Daughter (1999)
- Life (1999)
- City of Angels (2000)
- How the Grinch Stole Christmas (2000)
- Hood of Horror (2006)
- The Warlords (2007)
- The Mooring (2012)
- Java Heat (2013)
- Amityville: The Awakening (2017)
