= Irvin Shapiro =

American film distributor

- Born: August 6, 1906; Washington, D.C., U.S.
- Died: January 1, 1989 (aged 82); New York City, New York, U.S.
- Occupations: Producer, film importer, and distributor
- Years active: 1932–1985

Irvin Shapiro (August 6, 1906 – January 1, 1989) was an American producer, film importer, and film distributor who was responsible for introducing a number of influential foreign films to the United States, as well as handling the early work of some noted directors.

== Biography ==
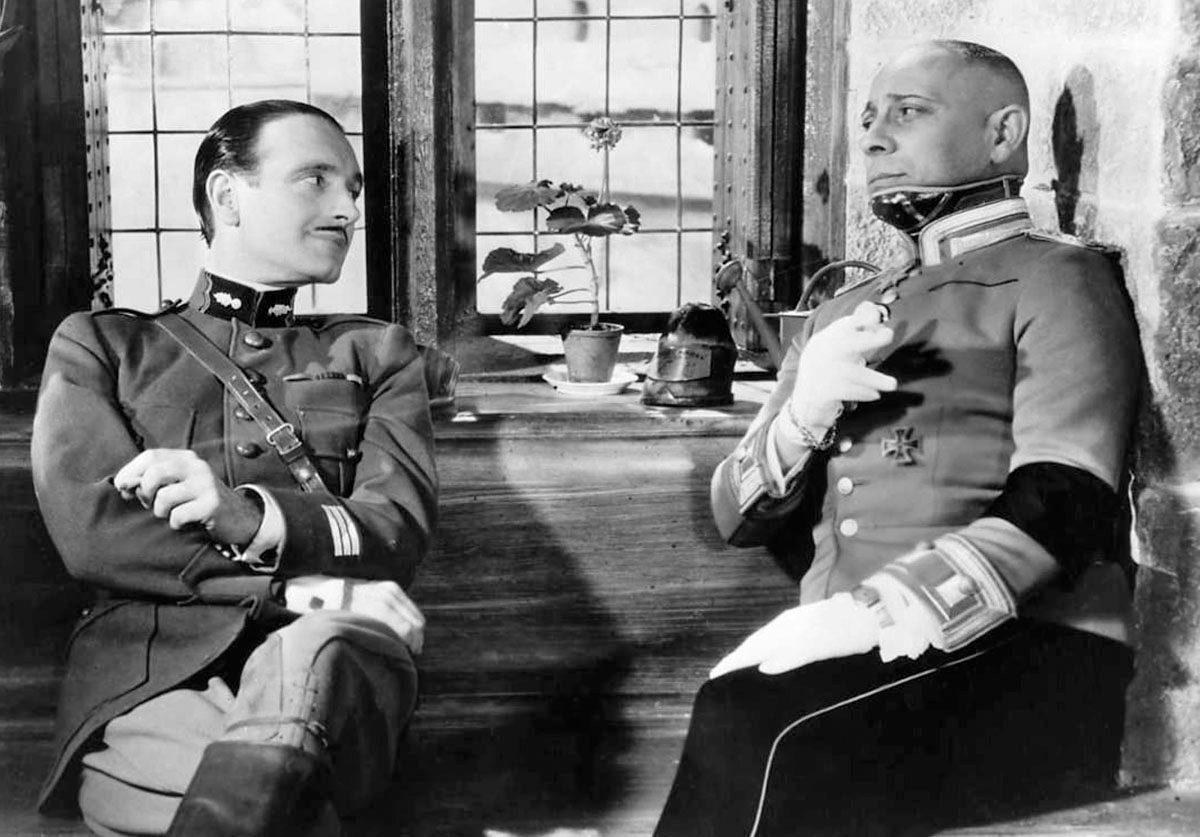
La Grande Illusion (1937) was among the international films brought to the United States by the World Pictures Corporation.

Shapiro was born on August 6, 1906, in Washington, D.C. In the early 1920s, while still a teenager, he developed an interest in cinema, writing film reviews for the Washington Herald and later managing the Wardman Park Hotel Theatre, a local cinema. Moving to New York, he became involved in the distribution of foreign films in America and independent films overseas, as well as working for a year at the publicity office of RKO Pictures. In 1932, he set up World Pictures Corporation (also known as DuWorld Pictures and Films Around The World), a film distribution company that also worked on the development of specialist cinemas. He headed the company until 1985, when he was forced to sell due to health problems (he was suffering from Parkinson's disease).

== Film Classics ==
Shapiro founded another company in 1943, Film Classics, which dealt with film reissues and American releases of British Gaumont Films. The company began producing its own films and releasing other new productions in 1947. In 1950 it merged with Eagle-Lion to become Eagle-Lion Classics.

In the 1950s, obtaining the rights to some 1940s films produced by MGM (among others), Shapiro became a pioneer in the release of films to television through Unity Television, which he co-founded in 1949.

== Legacy ==
In over five decades as a distributor, Shapiro introduced American cinema-goers to many European films, including The Cabinet of Dr. Caligari (d. Robert Wiene, 1920), The Battleship Potemkin (d. Sergei Eisenstein, 1925), The Grand Illusion (d. Jean Renoir, 1937), Les Cousins (d. Claude Chabrol, 1959) and Breathless (d. Jean-Luc Godard, 1960), and was instrumental in helping end the American boycott of German films after World War II. He was also the first to handle films by such directors as Martin Scorsese, Stanley Kubrick, George A. Romero, Sidney J. Furie and Sam Raimi (whose first film, The Evil Dead (1981), had its title suggested by Shapiro), and was one of the founders of the Cannes Film Festival (at which The Evil Dead was later shown). In many interviews and public comments, Raimi and Bruce Campbell (the chief creative forces behind The Evil Dead) have described Shapiro as an eccentric but extremely talented film producer, and frequently do an impression of Shapiro, with a thick, raspy voice, explaining how to market their film. Raimi has credited Shapiro with his early success.

Irvin Shapiro died at his home in New York on January 1, 1989, due to complications from Parkinson's disease. He was 82.

In the ending credits to the 2013 film Evil Dead, the director and producers present a message written in memory of Shapiro. It says: "Special thanks to . . . Irvin Shapiro, to whom we will always be indebted."
