= 56th Sitges Film Festival =

2023 edition of Spanish film festival

- Official poster by Nacho Alegre.
- Opening film: Sister Death
- Location: Sitges, Catalonia, Spain
- Awards: Best Feature Film: When Evil Lurks
- Festival date: 5–15 October 2023

Sitges Film Festival
- 2024 2022

The 56th Sitges International Fantastic Film Festival of Catalonia took place from 5 October to 15, 2023, in Sitges, Catalonia, Spain. The supernatural horror film Sister Death, directed by Paco Plaza, opened the festival. Argentine horror film When Evil Lurks by Demián Rugna won the Best Feature Film Award.

== Background ==
The official artwork for the festival was unveiled on 24 May 2023. Photographed by Nacho Alegre, it was inspired by Alfred Hitchcock's 1963 film The Birds, commemorating the 60th anniversary of the film. On 12 September, the festival announced both the recipients for the special awards and the complete lineup. German-American producer Jan Harlan and American director and visual effects supervisor Phil Tippett wil received the Honorary Grand Prize while Spanish director J. A. Bayona, Japanese director Hideo Nakata and American director Lee Unkrich, all will be honored with the Time Machine Award (Premi Màquina del Temps).

== Juries ==
The juries consists of the following members:

=== Main competition ===
- Jérôme Paillard, French producer
- Ana Torrent, Spanish actress
- David C. Fein, American producer
- Kim Newman, British critic and writer
- Alexandra Heller-Nicholas, Australian film critic and historian

=== Noves Visions / Anima't ===
- Katharina Kubrick, American art director
- Sergi Caballero, Spanish filmmaker
- Fred Tsui, Chinese consultant

=== Blood Window / Òrbita ===
- Max Karli, French film producer
- Agnela Domínguez, Spanish cultural manager
- Júlia Olmo, Spanish journalist and critic

=== Méliès d'Argent ===
- Matthew Turner, British journalist and film critic
- Alexandra West, Canadian film critic
- Maura McHugh, Irish writer

=== Brigadoon ===
- Raúl Cerezo, Spanish director
- Daniel Rodríguez Sánchez, Spanish writer and critic
- Aida Solé, Spanish blogger

=== Crítica / Méliès d'Or ===
- Ylenia Cañadas, Spanish film critic
- Francesc Miró, Spanish film critic
- Antoni Peris, Spanish film critic

=== SGAE Nova Autoria ===
- Jaume Balagueró, Spanish director and screenwriter
- Marta Grau, Spanish screenwriter, writer and script editor
- Alfonso De Vilallonga, Spanish film composer, vocalist and singer-songwriter

== Sections ==
The films selected for each section are as follows:

=== Official selection ===
==== In competition ====
English title	Original title	Director(s)	Production countrie(s)
Acid	Acide	Just Philippot	France
Best Wishes to All	みなに幸あれ	Yuta Shimotsu	Japan
Club Zero		Jessica Hausner	Austria, United Kingdom
She Is Conann	Conann	Bertrand Mandico	France, Luxembourg, Belgium
When Evil Lurks	Cuando acecha la maldad	Demián Rugna	Argentina
Divinity		Eddie Alcazar	United States
The Animal Kingdom	Le Règne animal	Thomas Cailley	France
In Flames		Zarrar Kahn	Canada, Pakistan
It Lives Inside		Bishal Dutta	United States
Kubi	首	Takeshi Kitano	Japan
The Wait	La espera	F. Javier Gutiérrez	Spain
Bitten	La Morsure	Romain de Saint-Blanquat	France
Late Night with the Devil		Colin Cairnes, Cameron Cairnes	Australia
Red Rooms	Les chambres rouges	Pascal Plante	Canada
Flies	Moscas	Aritz Moreno	Spain, Argentina
Omen		Baloji Tshiani	Congo, Netherlands, France, Belgium, Germany, South Africa
Riddle of Fire		Weston Razooli	United States
Robot Dreams (Note: Nominated for the Anima't Best Animated Film Award)		Pablo Berger	Spain, France
Killing Romance	킬링 로맨스	Lee Won-suk	South Korea
Salem		Jean-Bernard Marlin	France
Sleep	잠	Jason Yu	South Korea
Sorcery	Brujería	Christopher Murray	Chile, Mexico, Germany
Stopmotion		Robert Morgan	United Kingdom
The Seeding		Barnaby Clay	United States
The Universal Theory	Die Theorie von Allem	Timm Kröger	Germany
There's Something in the Barn		Magnus Martens	Norway
Tiger Stripes		Amanda Nell Eu	Malaysia, Taiwan, France, Germany, Netherlands, Indonesia
Infested	Vermines	Sébastien Vaniček	France
Vincent Must Die	Vincent doit mourir	Stéphan Castaing	France
Wake Up		François Simard, Annouk Whissel, Yoann-Karl Whissel	France
White Plastic Sky	Műanyag égbolt	Tibor Bánóczki, Sarolta Szabó	Hungary, Slovakia

Highlighted title indicates Best Feature Film winner.

==== Out of competition ====
English title	Original title	Director(s)	Production countrie(s)
Special Screenings
Aliens Abducted My Parents and Now I Feel Kinda Left Out		Jake Van Wagoner	United States
Amelia's Children		Gabriel Abrantes	Portugal
Awareness		Daniel Benmayor	United States, Spain
Blood		Brad Anderson	United States
The Boy and the Heron	君たちはどう生きるか	Hayao Miyazaki	Japan
The Chapel	La ermita	Carlota Pereda	Spain
Society of the Snow	La sociedad de la nieve	J. A. Bayona	Spain
Poor Things		Yorgos Lanthimos	United Kingdom
Sister Death (opening film)	Hermana Muerte	Paco Plaza	Spain
The Toxic Avenger		Macon Blair	United States
UFO Sweden		Crazy Pictures	Sweden
Midnight Special
God Is a Bullet		Nick Cassavetes	United States
The Deep Dark	Gueules noires	Mathieu Turi	France

=== Shorts ===
English title	Original title	Director(s)	Production countrie(s)
Abominations		Mike Fontaine	United States
Ahora vuelvo		Lucas Paulino, Gabe Ibáñez	Spain
Bloody Fury		Jordan Inconstant	France
Callus		Ciarán Hickey	Ireland
Escape Attempt		Alex Topaller, Daniel Shapiro	United States, Portugal
Eyestring		Javier Devitt	United States, Argentina
Fishmonger		Neil Ferron	United States
Hito		Stephen Lopez	Philippines
Honk		Charles de Lauzirika	United States
I'm Not a Robot		Victoria Warmerdam	Netherlands, Belgium
Intercanvi		Alberto Evangelio	Spain
Paragon		Colin Treneff	United States
Pesudo		Miquel Díaz Pont	Spain
Stop Dead		Emily Greenwood	United Kingdom
Storm		Lena Tsodykovskaya	United States
Sugar Rag		Jai Love	United States, Australia
The Many Worlds of George Goodman		Gregg Bishop	United States
The Shore		Eron Sheean	Netherlands, Australia
Anima't
A Night with Moosina	Wang Shen Zhi Ye	Shiu-Cheng Tsai	Taiwan
Astoria		Franch Dion	France
Bye Bear		Jan Bitzer	Germany
De Imperio		Alessandro Novelli	Portugal, Spain
Drijf		Levi Stoops	Belgium
Eeva		Morten Tšinakov, Lucija Mrzljak	Estonia, Croatia
Flite		Tim Webber	United Kingdom
Garden of Remembrance		Naoko Yamada	Japan
Ghost of the Dark Path		Fish Wang	Taiwan
La última historia		Vicente Molina	Spain
Nezumikozō Jirokichi		Rintaro	Japan, France
No Room at the Inn		R. O. Blechman	United States
Radio-Pilotis		Sonia Gerbeaud	France, Portugal
Sweet Like Lemons		Jenny Jokela	United Kingdom, Finland
The Great Arc		Camille Authouart	France
The Smile		Erik van Schaaik	Netherlands, Belgium
To Bird or Not to Bird		Martín Romero	Spain
Special Sessions
ALEXX196 & la plage de sable rose		Loïc Hobi	France, Switzerland
Dark Cell		Jean-Michel Tari	France
La ley del más fuerte		Raul Monge	Spain
Los cómplices		Alberto Evangelio	Spain
Milk & Cookies		Giancarlo Fernandez	United Kingdom
Paradero 893		Marc Martínez Pijoan	Spain
Tooth		Jillian Corsie	United States
Venus		Jolan Nihilo, Mickaël Dusa	France

=== Órbita ===
English title	Original title	Director(s)	Production countrie(s)
Black Flies		Jean-Stéphane Sauvaire	United States
Concrete Utopia	콘크리트 유토피아	Um Tae-hwa	South Korea
Diabolik: Ginko Attacks!	Diabolik - Ginko all'attacco!	Marco Manetti, Antonio Manetti	Italy
The Roundup: No Way Out	범죄도시3	Lee Sang-yong	South Korea
Jackdaw		Jamie Childs	United Kingdom
Jericho Ridge		Will Gilbey	Kosovo, United Kingdom
The Extortion	La extorsión	Martino Zaidelis	Argentina
The Night Owl	올빼미	Ahn Tae-jin	South Korea
Lumberjack the Monster	怪物の木こり	Takashi Miike	Japan
Mad Fate	命案	Soi Cheang	Hong Kong
Night of the Hunted		Franck Khalfoun	France
Property	Propriedade	Daniel Bandeira	Brazil
Smugglers	밀수	Ryoo Seung-wan	South Korea
The Childe	귀공자	Park Hoon-jung	South Korea
The Last Stop in Yuma County		Francis Galluppi	United States
Where the Wind Blows	風再起時	Philip Yung	China, Hong Kong

Highlighted title indicates Òrbita winner.

=== Panorama ===
English title	Original title	Director(s)	Production countrie(s)
#Manhole		Kazuyoshi Kumakiri	Japan
Appendage		Anna Zlokovic	United States
Blackout		Larry Fessenden	United States
Brooklyn 45		Ted Geoghegan	United States
Godless: The Eastfield Exorcism		Nick Kozakis	Australia
Hood Witch		Saïd Belktibia	France
Last Straw		Alan Scott Neal	United States
Let It Ghost		Hoi Wong	Hong Kong
Nina of the Wolves	Nina dei lupi	Antonio Pisu	Italy
Onyx the Fortuitous and the Talisman of Souls		Andrew Bowser	United States
Project Silence	탈출: Project Silence	Kim Tae-gon	South Korea
Rabia		Jorge Michel Grau	Mexico
Restore Point	Bod obnovy	Robert Hloz	Czech Republic
Superposition		Karoline Lyngbye	Denmark
The Forbidden Play	禁じられた遊び	Hideo Nakata	Japan
The Sacrifice Game		Jenn Wexler	United States
You'll Never Find Me		Josiah Allen, Indianna Bell	Australia
Special Screenings
Cuando los amos duermen		Santiago Alvarado	Spain
Immersion	忌怪島	Takashi Shimizu	Japan
The Primevals		David Allen	United States
Tokyo Revengers 2: Bloody Halloween Part 1	東京リベンジャーズ2 血のハロウィン編 運命	Tsutomu Hanabusa	Japan
Tokyo Revengers 2: Bloody Halloween Part 2	東京リベンジャーズ2 血のハロウィン編 決戦	Tsutomu Hanabusa	Japan

=== Anima't ===
English title	Original title	Director(s)	Production countrie(s)
Deep Sea	深海	Tian Xiaopeng	China
Four Souls of Coyote	Kojot négy lelke	Áron Gauder	Hungary
Tender Metalheads	Heavies tendres	Joan Tomàs, Carlos Pérez-Reche, Juanjo Sáez	Spain
Komada – A Whisky Family	駒田蒸留所へようこそ	Masayuki Yoshihara	Japan
Lonely Castle in the Mirror	かがみの孤城	Keiichi Hara, Takakazu Nagamoto	Japan
Mars Express		Jérémie Périn	France
Sand Land		Toshihisa Yokoshima	Japan
Tony, Shelly and the Magic Light	Tonda, Slávka a kouzelné světlo	Filip Pošivač	Hungary, Solavkia
Special Screenings
Phoenix: Reminiscence of Flower	火の鳥 #エデンの花	Shōjirō Nishimi	Japan
The Feast of Anrita	アムリタの饗宴	Saku Sakamoto	Japan

Highlighted title indicates Best Animated Feature Film winner.

=== Noves Visions ===
English title	Original title	Director(s)	Production countrie(s)
All You Need is Death		Paul Duane	Ireland
Embryo Larva Butterfly		Kyros Papavassiliou	Greece, Cyprus
For Night Will Come	En Attendant la Nuit (opening film)	Céline Rouzet	France
Halfway Home		Madarász Isti	Hungary
Humanist Vampire Seeking Consenting Suicidal Person	Vampire humaniste cherche suicidaire consentant	Ariane Louis-Seize	Canada
Hundreds of Beavers		Mike Cheslik	United States
In My Mother's Skin		Kenneth Dagatan	Philippines, Singapore, Taiwan
The Last Night of Sandra M.	La última noche de Sandra M.	Borja de la Vega	Spain
Luka		Jessica Woodworth	Belgium, Italy, Netherlands, Bulgaria, Armenia
Mimì: Prince of Darkness	Mimì - Il principe delle tenebre	Brando De Sica	Italy
Mondays: See You "This" Week!		Ryo Takebayashi	Japan
Monolith		Matt Vesely	Australia
Moon Garden		Ryan Stevens Harris	United States
Motel Melati		Mike Wiluan, Billy Christian	Indonesia, Singapore
My Animal		Jacqueline Castel	Canada
Pandemonium		Quarxx	France
Raging Grace		Paris Zarcilla	United Kingdom
River		Junta Yamaguchi	Japan
Cobweb (closing film)	거미집	Kim Jee-woon	South Korea
The Funeral		Orçun Behram	Turkey
The Invisible Fight		Rainer Sarnet	Estonia, Lithuania, Greece, Finland
The Last Ashes	Läif a Séil	Loïc Tanson	Luxembourg, Belgium
The Uncle		David Kapac, Andrija Mardesic	Serbia, Croatia
The Vourdalak	Le Vourdalak	Adrien Beau	France
Where the Devil Roams		Zelda Adams, John Adams, Toby Poser	United States
Petit Format
A Kind of Girl Who Knows Blanche		Seyoung Lee	South Korea
Collection of Extremely Short Stories		Pedro Villaça	Brazil
Cultes		David Padilla	France
Days of Spring		Arianne Hinz	Netherlands
Gable		Theo Taplitz	United States
Half-Dream		Jan Grabowski	Poland
Mothers and Monsters		Édith Jorisch	Canada
Pruning		Lola Blanc	United States
Retrodreaming		Alisa Berger	Germany, Japan
Spoor		Statten Roeg, Sunita Soliar	United Kingdom, Mexico
The Old Young Crow		Liam Lopinto	Japan, United States
Zero at the Bone		Erin Grant	United States
Petit Format - Special Sessions
Mamántula		Ion de Sosa	Germany, Spain
Print the Legend		Victor Matellano	Spain
We Are Animals		Thijs Bouman	Netherlands

Highlighted title indicates Noves Visions winner.

=== Series ===
English title	Original title	Director(s)	Production countrie(s)
30 Coins (episodes "El pueblo fantasma" and "Las tierras del sueño")	30 monedas	Álex de la Iglesia	Spain
The Other Side (episodes 1-3)	El otro lado	Javier Ruiz Caldera, Alberto de Toro	Spain
Luz en la oscuridad: Daniela, dulce y bella (episodes 1-2)		—N/a	Spain
Romancero (episodes 1-2)		Tomás Peña	Spain, United States

=== Nova Autoria ===
Title	Director(s)	Production countrie(s)	University/School
California	Albert Mariné	Spain	Escola de Cinema de Reus
El último recuerdo	Javier Sáez	Spain	International University of Catalonia
Fuego amigo	Asha Ruiz	Spain	Catalonia Film School
Lifetime	Ariadna Puigdemasa	Spain	Escola de Disseny i Arts Visuals LCI Barcelona
Los Frustrado	Martí Rovira Cortada	Spain	Tecnocampus, Escola Superior Politècnica
Not Yet	Pau Ballesté Aguirre, Maria Bros Carreras, Jorge Librero Cano	Spain	Autonomous University of Barcelona
O que me parta un rayo	Karen Joaquín	Spain	Escola de Cinema de Barcelona
Tenemos patria	Mikel Garrido Linares	Spain	Escola Superior de Cinema i Audiovisuals de Catalunya
The Sun Thief	Joan Cerdà Monterio, Maria Agustina Montaña	Spain	L'IDEM Barcelona, Creative Arts School
Tiet	Iris Dalmau	Spain	FX ANIMATION Barcelona 3D & Film School

=== Sitges Documenta ===
English title	Original title	Director(s)	Production countrie(s)
A Disturbance in the Force		Jeremy Coon, Steve Kozak	United States
Dario Argento Panico		Simone Scafidi	United Kingdom
Dream Time		Claudio Lattanzi	Italy
Enter the Clones of Bruce		David Gregory	United States
Kaidan: Strange Stories of Japanese Ghosts		Yves Montmayeur	France
Kim's Video		David Redmon, Ashley Sabin	United States
Living with Chucky		Kyra Elise Gardner	United States
Loch Ness: They Created a Monster		John MacLaverty	United Kingdom
Mujeres sin censura		Eva Vizcarra	Spain
Otra película maldita		Alberto Fasce, Mario Varela	Argentina
The History of Metal and Horror		Mike Schiff	United States
Satan Wants You		Sean Horlor, Steve J. Adams	Canada
Sharksploitation		Stephen Scarlata	United States
Spooktacular!		Quinn Monahan	United States
The Darkside of Society		Larry Wade Carrell	United States
The J-Horror Virus		Sarah Appleton, Jasper Sharp	Japan, United Kingdom
1 Million Zombies: The Story of Plaga Zombie	Un millón de zombies: La historia de Plaga Zombie	Nicanor Loreti, Camilo de Cabo	Argentina
You Can Call Me Bill		Alexandre O. Philippe	United States

=== Midnight X-Treme ===
English title	Original title	Director(s)	Production countrie(s)
All You Need is Blood		Cooper Roberts	United States
Kill		Nikhil Nagest Bhat	India
Mad Cats		Reiki Tsuno	Japan
I'll Crush Y'all	Os reviento	Kike Narcea	Spain
The Well		Federico Zampaglione	Italy
The Wrath of Becky		Matt Angel, Suzanne Coote	United States
Triggered		Richard V. Somes	Philippines
We Are Zombies		RKSS (François Simard, Anouk Whissell, Yoann-Karl Whissell)	Canada
Winnie-the-Pooh: Blood and Honey		Rhys Frake-Waterfield	United Kingdom

=== Brigadoon ===
English title	Original title	Director(s)	Production countrie(s)
Feature Film Premieres
Auxilio		Tamae Garateguy	Argentina
Thorns		Douglas Schulze	United States
Maria		Gabriel Grieco, Nicanor Loreti	Argentina
The Barn Part II		Justin M. Seaman	United States
Documentaries
Mancunian Man: The Legendary Life of Cliff Twemlow		Jake West	United Kingdom
Dario Argento's Museum of Horrors	Il museo degli orrori di Dario Argento	Luigi Cozzi	Italy
Nosferatu Award Barbara Bouchet
The Red Queen Kills Seven Times (1972)	La dama rossa uccide sette volte	Emilio Miraglia	Italy
Amuck! (1972)	Alla ricerca del piacere	Silvio Amadio	Italy
Caliber 9 (1972)	Milano calibro 9	Fernando Di Leo	Italy
Black Belly of the Tarantula (1971)	La tarantola dal ventre nero	Paolo Cavara	Italy
Special Screenings
Il Boss (1973)		Fernando Di Leo	Italy
Somebody is Watching You (1988)	Alguien te está mirando	Gustavo Cova, Horacio Maldonado	Argentina
Plaga Zombie (1997)		Pablo Parés, Hernán Sáez	Argentina
Monster Heaven: Ghost Hero (1990)	妖怪天国・ゴーストヒーロー	Makoto Tezuka	Japan
Cut and Run (1985)	Inferno in diretta	Ruggero Deodato	Italy
Take a Hard Ride (1975)	La parola di un fuorilegge... è legge!	Antonio Margheriti	Italy
Maria's Stomach (1990)	マリアの胃袋	Hideyuki Hirayama	Japan
The Atlantis Interceptors (1983)	I predatori di Atlantide	Ruggero Deodato	Italy
Tintorera (1977)		René Cardona Jr.	Mexico
Samurai Ninja Onimanji (2023)		Yoshihiro Nishimura	Japan
Great White (1981)	L'ultimo squalo	Enzo G. Castellari	Italy
Door (1988)		Banmei Takahashi	Italy
Hall of Frame: María Luisa Pino (2023)		Guillermo López Aliaga, Fran Mateu	Spain
The Reluctant Icon: A Tribute to Laura Gemser (2023)		Kier-La Janisse	United States, Canada
Blood-Sucking Tree (1992)	吸血木	Shunji Iwai, Masaharu Ota, Akira Yoneta	Japan
The Swamp of the Ravens (1974)	El pantano de los cuervos	Manuel Caño	Spain
Santo in the Vengeance of the Mummy (1971)	Santo en la venganza de la momia	Carlos Aured	Spain
Oldboy (2003)	올드보이	Park Chan-wook	South Korea
Santo Contra los Zombies (1961)		Benito Alazraki	Mexico
Humanoid Puppet (1992)		Hidehiro Ito	Japan

=== Sitges Classics ===
English title	Original title	Director(s)	Production countrie(s)
Acción mutante (1993)		Álex de la Iglesia	Spain
Don't Torture a Duckling (1972)	Non si sevizia un paperino	Lucio Fulci	Italy
Caligula - The Ultimate Cut (1979)		Tinto Brass	United States, Italy
Contempt (1963)	Le Mépris	Jean-Luc Godard	France
Enter the Game of Death (1978)	十字手拳	Lee Tso-nam	Hong Kong
The Raid (2011)		Gareth Evans	Indonesia
Extra Terrestrial Visitors (1983)	Los nuevos extraterrestres	Juan Piquer Simón	Spain
The Shining (1980)		Stanley Kubrick	United States
The Exorcist (1973)		William Friedkin	United States
Lake Michigan Monster (2018)		Ryland Brickson Cole Tews	United States
Pet Sematary (1989)		Mary Lambert	United States
Psychic Vision: Jaganrei (1988)		Teruyoshi Ishii	Japan
King Kong (1933)		Merian C. Cooper, Ernest B. Schoedsack	United States
The Wicker Man (1973)		Robin Hardy	United Kingdom
Black Sunday (1960)	La maschera del demonio	Mario Bava	Italy
The Dragon Lives Again (1977)	李三腳威震地獄門	Law Kei	Hong Kong
Cannibal Holocaust (1980)		Ruggero Deodato	Italy
Siesta (1987)		Mary Lambert	United States
Star Trek: The Motion Picture - The Director's Edition		Robert Wise	United States
Anima't
The Masters of Time (1982)	Les Maîtres du temps	René Laloux	France, Hungary, Switzerland
The Soldier's Tale (1984)		R. O. Blechman	United States
100 Years of Walt Disney Animation Studios: An Hommage to Its Short Films (2023)		Various authors	United States
Panic City
Don't Look Now (1973)	A Venezia... un Dicembre rosso shocking	Nicolas Roeg	United Kingdom
Hollywood 90028 (1973)		Christina Hornisher	United States
Pájaros de ciudad (1983)		José María Sánchez Álvaro	Spain, Italy
Naked Lunch (1991)		David Cronenberg	Canada, United Kingdom
A House Without Boundaries (1972)	La casa sin fronteras	Pedro Olea	Spain
God Told Me To (1976)		Larry Cohen	United States
The Last Days (2013)	Los últimos días	Álex Pastor, David Pastor	Spain
Seven Chances
The Fourth Victim (1971)	In fondo alla piscina	Eugenio Martín	Spain, Italy
La Venere d'Ille (1979)		Mario Bava, Lamberto Bava	Italy
Los leprosos y el sexo (1970)		René Cardona	Mexico
O-Bi, O-Ba: The End of Civilization (1985)	O-bi, o-ba: Koniec cywilizacji	Piotr Szulkin	Poland
The Appointment (1980)		Lindsey C. Vickers	United Kingdom
The McPherson Tape (1989)		Dean Alioto	United States
Twilight (1990)	Szürkület	György Fehér	Hungary

== Awards ==
The following awards were presented at the 56th Edition:

=== Official competition ===
- Best Feature Film: When Evil Lurks by Damián Rugna
- Special Jury Award: Stopmotion by Robert Morgan & Infested by Sébastien Vaniček
- Best Direction: Baloji Tshiani for Omen
- Best Actress: Kate Lyn Sheil for The Seeding
  - Special Mention for Best Actress: Zafreen Zairizal for Tiger Stripes
- Best Actor: Karim Leklou for Vincent Must Die
- Best Screenplay: Colin Cairnes, Cameron Cairnes for Late Night with the Devil
- Best Special, Visual or Makeup Effects: Frédéric Lainé, Jean-Christophe Spadaccini, Pascal Molina, Cyrille Bonjean-Jean, Bruno Sommier and Jean-Louis Autret for The Animal Kingdom
- Best Music: Markus Binder for Club Zero
- Best Cinematography: Martin Roux for Bitten
- Special Mentions: Moscas by Aritz Moreno & Riddle of Fire by Weston Razooli

=== Noves Visions ===
- Best Film: Moon Garden by Ryan Stevens Harris
- Best Direction: David Kapac and Andrija Mardesic for The Uncle
- Best Short Film: The Old Young Crow by Liam Lopinto
- Special Mentions
  - Special Mention: Halfway Home by Madarász Isti
  - Special Mention for Screenplay: Christine Doyon and Ariane Louis-Seize for Humanist Vampire Seeking Consenting Suicidal Person
  - Special Mention for Cinematography: Andrea Arnone for Mimì: Prince of Darkness

=== Méliès d'Argent ===
- Méliès d'Argent Award for the Best Fantastic Genre Feature Film: Bitten by Romain de Saint-Blanquat
- Méliès d'Argent Award for the Best European Fantastic Genre Short Film: Cultes by David Padilla

=== Anima't ===
- Best Animated Feature Film: Tony, Shelly and the Magic Light by Filip Pošivač
- Best Animated Short Film: Ghost of the Dark Path by Fish Wang

=== Òrbita ===
- Best Feature Film: The Last Stop in Yuma County by Francis Galluppi

=== Critic's Jury ===
- José Luis Guarner Critics' Award for Best Film in the SOFC: The Universal Theory by Timm Kröger
- Citizen Kane Award for Best New Director: Stéphan Castaing for Vincent Must Die
- Best Short Film in the SOFC: I'm Not a Robot by Victoria Warmerdam

=== Brigadoon ===
- Brigadoon Paul Naschy Award for the Best Short Film: Ellos by Néstor López, Óscar Romero

=== SGAE Nova Autoria ===
- Best Direction-Production: Mikel Garrido for Tenemos patria
- Best Screenplay: Karen Joaquín for O que me parta un rayo
- Best Original Music: Márcio Echeverria for The Sun Thief

=== Carnet Jove Jury ===
- Best Feature Film in the SOFC: Bitten by Romain de Saint-Blanquat
- Best Sitges Documenta Film: Kim's Video by David Redmon, Ashley Sabin

=== People' Choice Award ===
- Grand People's Choice Award for Best Feature Film in the SOFC: Robot Dreams by Pablo Berger
- Panorama Fantàstic People's Choice Award: Godless: The Eastfield Exorcism by Nick Kozakis
- Focus Asia People's Choice Award: The Roundup: No Way Out by Lee Sang-yong
- Midnight X-Treme People's Choice Award: I'll Crush Y'all by Kike Narcea

=== Other awards ===
- Blood Window Award for Best Feature Film: When Evil Lurks by Damian Rugna

=== Special awards ===
- Honorary Grand Prize: Jan Harlan and Phil Tippett
- Time Machine Award: J. A. Bayona, Hideo Nakata, Lee Unkrich
