= Maude Davey =

Australian actress (born 1963)

- Born: 1963 (age 62–63); Perth, Australia
- Occupations: Actress; director; screenwriter
- Years active: 1985–present

Maude Davey (born 1963) is an Australian actress, director, and screenwriter who has been active in the national stage, television and cinema of Australia since the 1980s.

== Career ==
Davey was born in 1963 in Perth, Western Australia, and has a twin sister named Annie, who is also an actress. The family relocated to Melbourne, and the Davey sisters grew up there. Maude went on to develop a thirty-year-long career in the city of Melbourne and elsewhere in Australia. She trained in acting at the Victorian College of the Arts (VCA) and graduated in 1985.

After her career at the VCA, Davey began acting on stage and working with local figures and groups involved with musical theatre and burlesque plays. She later directed her own shows, including Fish! For the Rollercoaster Ensemble (2017) and Mongrel (2018). In the 1990s, Davey worked with her sister and artist and director David Pledger in Pledger's show Not Yet It’s Difficult. In 2015, the Davey sisters launched their neo-burlesque and vaudeville show Retro Futurismus, which toured several states of Australia.

Between 1999 and 2002, Davey was part of the directorate of HotHouse Theatre, where she worked on a production with Chris Thompson and Wayne Hope. She ran the companies Vital Statistics from 2002 until 2007, and later the Melbourne Workers Theatre. In 2018, Davey took part in the theatre adaptation of the 2011 film Melancholia of Lars von Trier. The play was written by playwright Declan Greene and featured at Malthouse Theatre in Melbourne.

Davey's television works include minor roles in Janus (1994–1995) and Summer Heights High (2007), Offspring (2011–2014), The Newsreader (2021–2025), and more recently, The Family Next Door (2025).

In cinema, Davey's performances include Only the Brave (1994), Noise (2007), My Year Without Sex (2009), The Dry (2020), and Spit (2025).

In 2026, Davey was cast for the international horror production Evil Dead Burn, where she portrays an elderly lady of much older age than hers, for which she had to go through five or six hours of makeup to look like the 90-year-old character. Director Sébastien Vaniček stated in an interview that Davey was cast because an actually elderly lady would not have been able to perform the movements that the script required for the character.

== Selected roles ==
=== Television ===
Year	Title	Role	Ref.
1992	The Flying Doctors	Miss Cameron	
1994	Blue Heelers	Jean Blakely	
1994–1995	Janus	Leslie Keilor	
2002	MDA	Dr. Georgia Black	
2003	BackBerner	Shopper	
2007	Summer Heights High	Jan Palmer	
2009–2012	Tangle	Agatha	
2010	Rush	Donna	
2011	The Slap	Tasha	
2011–2014	Offspring	Dr. Nadine Samir	
2013–2014	The Doctor Blake Mysteries	Mrs Ashford	
2017	The Leftovers	Hildy	
2019	Bad Mothers	Magistrate	
2019	Utopia	Joan	
2023	Strife	Carmen	
2021–2023	Five Bedrooms	Pat	
2021–2025	The Newsreader	Val Jennings	
2025	The Family Next Door	Helen Gillespie	
2025	Apple Cider Vinegar	Margaret	

=== Film ===
Year	Title	Role	Ref.
1994	Only the Brave	Kate	
1994	The Sewing Room	Grace	
1999	Strange Fits of Passion	Woman in Gay Bookshop	
2007	Noise	Constable Rhonda Harris	
2009	My Year Without Sex	Agatha	
2009	Broken Hill	Social worker Dinnattee	
2017	Lazybones	Matilda	
2018	The Five Provocations		
2018	30 Minutes of Danger	The Technician	
2019	Ride Like a Girl	Therapist	
2020	The Dry	Helen	
2025	Spit	Jane Holland	
2026	Evil Dead Burn	Polly Price	

=== Stage ===
Year	Title	Role	Notes
1992	Macbeth	Lady Macbeth	
1994	In the Service of Beauty		Directed by Daniel Schlusser, based on work by writer Sam Sejavka
1995	Romeo & Juliet	Mercutio	
1998	Infectiou$		Directed by Melanie Beddie
2014	My Life in Boxes, Gravity Dolls		Directed
2015	Retro Futurismus		Director along with her sister Anni, Anna Lumb, and Gabi Barton. Vaudeville and post-burlesque show
2015	I am not a Unicorn		Original by Emma J. Hawkins
2016	Oh! What a Lovely War, Mate!		Directed. Play written by Nick Enright, who inspired himself in Joan Littlewood's Oh, What a Lovely War!
2017	Fish! For the Rollercoaster Ensemble		Director
2018	Mongrel		Director
2018	Melancholia	Gaby	Stage adaptation of the 2011 film Melancholia
