= Lily Blavin =

Lily Blavin is a film producer, director and founder of the production company Lightning Strikes Productions.

She was included on 2021 Forbes 30 Under 30 list in the Hollywood & Entertainment category.

== Career ==
Blavin began producing during her freshman year of college. During her junior and senior years of college, Blavin interned at the production company One Community.

In 2020, Blavin launched Lightning Strikes Productions, a production company focused on stories intended to contribute to positive social change. The company was developing an adaptation of Dave Pelzer's 1995 memoir A Child Called "It". Blavin was producing the film with David Goldblum.

The company's name was inspired by a conversation Blavin had with a producer about the difficulty of getting A Child Called "It" made. According to Blavin, the producer told her that the chances of the project being made were comparable to being struck by lightning. She subsequently named her company Lightning Strikes after deciding to pursue the project herself.

In 2025, Blavin produced the survival thriller The Wilderness, written and directed by Spencer King. The film follows a group of teenage boys who are taken to the Utah desert and forced into a wilderness therapy program. Blavin produced the film alongside Aaron Paul, Amy Berg, Larissa Beck, Hunter Doohan, Ali Edwards and King.

In August 2026, Blavin was involved in the rescue of beagles from Ridglan Farms, a breeding and medical testing facility in Wisconsin that had closed. WPTV reported that a coalition of rescue groups had spent six months relocating the animals, ultimately saving more than 2,100 beagles. Blavin, who had covered the situation for six years, was at the forefront of the rescue effort and was present during protests outside the facility.

In September 2026, Deadline announced Blavin made her directorial debut with the documentary They Were Good Dogs, which entered post-production after six years of investigation into the use of beagles in research, including the practices at Ridglan Farms that Blavin had documented. Blavin produced the film through Lightning Strikes Productions alongside Ross Kauffman, Sarah Sarandos, Scott Veltri and Robin Honan.

== Filmography ==
Year	Title	Role	Notes
2021	For Good	Producer	Short film
2025	The Wilderness	Producer	
2025	Dead Man's Wire	Executive producer	
2025	It's Never Over, Jeff Buckley	Associate producer	
2026	Company	Executive producer	
