= Evil Dead Burn =

2026 film by Sébastien Vaniček

- Theatrical release poster
- Directed by: Sébastien Vaniček
- Written by: Sébastien Vaniček; Florent Bernard
- Based on: The Evil Dead by Sam Raimi
- Produced by: Rob Tapert; Sam Raimi
- Starring: Souheila Yacoub; Tandi Wright; Hunter Doohan; Luciane Buchanan; Erroll Shand; Maude Davey
- Cinematography: Philip Lozano
- Edited by: Maxime Caro
- Music by: Double Danger
- Production companies: New Line Cinema; Screen Gems; Ghost House Pictures
- Distributed by: Warner Bros. Pictures
- Release date: July 10, 2026
- Running time: 109 minutes
- Country: United States
- Language: English
- Budget: $20 million
- Box office: $72.4 million

Evil Dead Burn is a 2026 American supernatural horror film written and directed by Sébastien Vaniček, who co-wrote it with Florent Bernard, and produced by Rob Tapert and series creator Sam Raimi. It serves as a sequel to Evil Dead Rise (2023) and is the sixth installment in the Evil Dead film series. The film stars Souheila Yacoub as a young woman who seeks solace with her in-laws following the death of her husband. As the family comes together in a secluded house, the gathering becomes a "family reunion from hell" when members gradually turn into Deadites. It also stars Tandi Wright, Hunter Doohan, Luciane Buchanan, Erroll Shand, and Maude Davey in supporting roles.

A sixth Evil Dead film was announced in February 2024, with Vaniček hired to direct a script he co-wrote with Florent Bernard. Raimi and Tapert served as producers, with Ghost House Pictures producing the project. In December 2024, Vaniček revealed the title to be Evil Dead Burn along with a release scheduled tentatively for 2026. Casting began in May 2025, while filming began in July and concluded in October that same year in New Zealand.

Evil Dead Burn was theatrically released in the United States on July 10, by Warner Bros. Pictures. The film received generally positive reviews from critics, and grossed $72.4 million worldwide on a budget of $20 million.

== Plot ==
At the Price family vacation house, Joseph Price discovers his late grandfather Benjamin's research, revealing that the Circle of the Wise Men used the Necronomicon to unleash flesh-possessing demons known as Deadites before discovering the Kandarian Dagger, which can banish them back to Hell. Joseph inadvertently removes the spells concealing the dagger from the Deadites.

Some time later, Joseph's brother, Will, argues with his wife, Alice, before drunkenly driving away. On a rural road, the Deadite-possessed Jessica steps in front of his car, (Note: The Deadite-possessed form of Jessica first appeared in Evil Dead Rise (2023)) causing him to crash. As Will burns to death, the decapitated Jessica recites a passage from the Necronomicon, transforming him into a Deadite.

At Will's cremation, Alice is reunited with Joseph, his girlfriend Thya, his parents Susan and Edgar, and his dementia-afflicted grandmother, Polly. Alice remains distant following Will's death. Afterwards, Edgar privately visits Will's coffin, where Deadite Will breaks free, kills the crematorium attendant, and burns Edgar's arm. The family returns to the house, where Edgar gradually succumbs to possession. At dinner, he blames Alice for Will's death before fatally stabbing the family dog Max. Joseph and Thya drive him toward a hospital, but Edgar fully transforms into a Deadite and crashes the car. Joseph abandons Thya and flees as Edgar kills her.

Alice is attacked by a resurrected Max before reuniting with Joseph at the house. Deadite Thya arrives and attacks the family before being trapped in the cellar. Outside, Edgar repeatedly shoots himself in the head without dying. While Alice, Joseph, and Susan struggle to understand what is happening, Thya tricks Polly into releasing her and infects her before Joseph bludgeons Thya to death. The ordeal triggers Alice's memories of Will's physical abuse. When questioned by Alice, Joseph reveals Benjamin's research about the Deadites. Polly later transforms into a Deadite and promises Susan that the family can be reunited, including Will, convincing her to let Edgar into the house. Edgar and Susan kiss, infecting her, before the couple demand that Joseph surrender the dagger in exchange for sparing the family. When Joseph refuses, Edgar mortally wounds him and attacks Susan. Alice hides as memories of Will's abuse continue to haunt her.

Exploring upstairs, Alice is ambushed by Polly, who convinces Susan to help kill her, but Alice subdues Polly and ties her to her stairlift, which drags her downstairs. Alice and Susan barricade themselves in a bathroom, but Alice restrains Susan for helping Polly. Susan blames Alice for destroying the family, while Alice accuses Susan of ignoring Will's abuse to preserve the illusion of a perfect family. Susan finally transforms into a Deadite and attacks Alice, who escapes into the attic. Deadite Joseph pursues her, but Alice finds the dagger and kills him with it, ending his possession. Alice escapes onto the roof, pursued by Susan and Edgar, before climbing back into the house through the chimney. She decapitates Susan with a rotary saw, seriously wounds Edgar, sets the house ablaze, and kills Max with the dagger. Collapsing outside, she hears Will's voice and sees his charred Deadite form standing before the burning house.

Alice flees to a nearby construction site, where Will cripples her leg and traps her in a pit filling with boiling tar. She fights him with a jackhammer before finally stabbing him with the dagger. Alice then sees a vision of Will restored to human form, telling her he loves her. She tearfully replies, "That's not enough", before crushing his Deadite head with her hands. Wounded, Alice crawls onto the road, where police and paramedics arrive. When asked who inflicted her injuries, she replies, "My ex-husband".

In post-credit scenes, Polly is revealed to have escaped after severing her own leg and attacks a passing motorist. Meanwhile, Deadite Ellie Bixler (Note: Ellie Bixler first appeared in Evil Dead Rise (2023)) is resurrected at the crematorium housing her unclaimed ashes and kills the manager's daughter.

== Cast ==
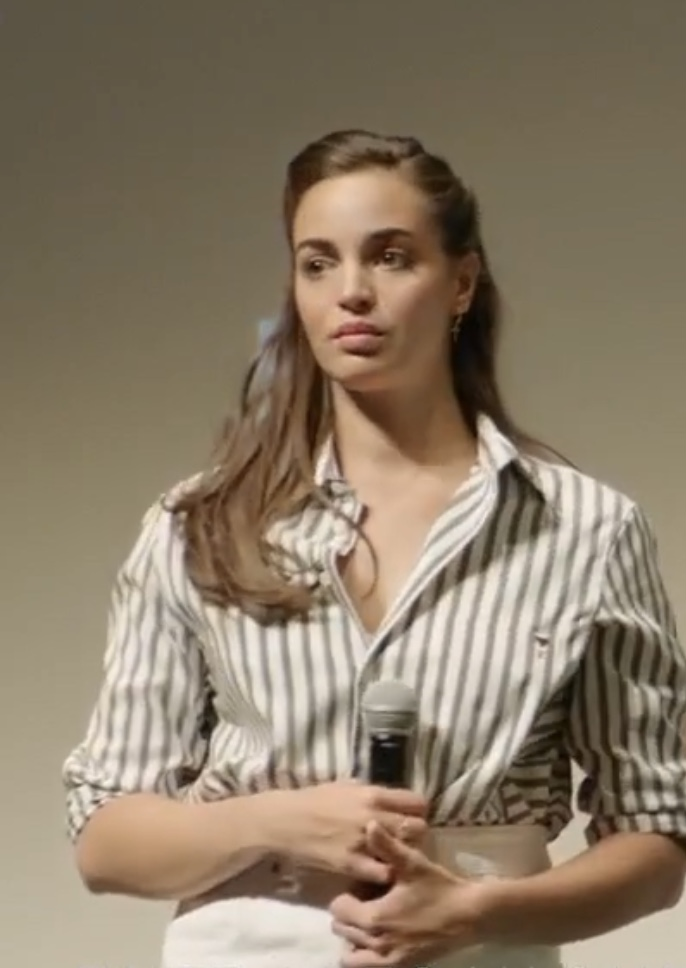
Lead actress Souheila Yacoub

- Souheila Yacoub as Alice Price
- Tandi Wright as Susan Price
- Hunter Doohan as Joseph Price
- Luciane Buchanan as Thya
- Erroll Shand as Edgar Price
- Maude Davey as Polly Price
- George Pullar as William Price

Evil Dead Burn also features Greta Van Den Brink as Jessica, Lara Macgregor as Manager, Keanu Karim as Jared, Shyamal Singh as Cremator (Jake), Victory Ndukwe as Leo, Keagan Carr Fransch as Firefighter, Tapiwa Soropa as Server (Mike), and Justin Benn as Taxi Driver.

Coco White appears as the Manager's Daughter, Dax as Max (The Dog), Zoe Brunton as Woman, Michael Hurst as Benjamin Price (voice), and Alain Chabat as Alice's father (voice). Alyssa Sutherland reprises her role as Ellie Bixler in a cameo appearance. Executive producer Bruce Campbell, who portrayed Ash Williams in previous installments of the franchise, has a cameo appearance in photographs, one of which was speculated by fans to be Benjamin Price, but this was denied by Campbell.

== Production ==
In February 2024, it was announced that a spin-off film of Evil Dead Rise was in development. Sébastien Vaniček signed on to direct from a screenplay he co-wrote with Florent Bernard. Series creator Sam Raimi hired Vaniček after being impressed by the latter's directorial debut Infested (2023). Raimi and Rob Tapert served as producers through their Ghost House Pictures banner, while Bruce Campbell and Lee Cronin served as executive producers. In May 2025, Souheila Yacoub was announced as the lead, with the film being co-financed by New Line Cinema (original distributor of the original 1981 film and producer of Rise through Warner Bros.) and Sony Pictures (which previously co-released the 2013 film with FilmDistrict through its TriStar Pictures banner and currently distributes the first film on home media). Later that month, Hunter Doohan, Luciane Buchanan, and Tandi Wright were added to the cast.

In July 2026, it was announced that the new movie would be one of the haunted houses featured for Halloween Horror Nights 2026 at Universal Studios Hollywood and Universal Studios Florida.

=== Filming ===
Principal photography began in New Zealand on July 22, 2025, with Philip Lozano serving as the cinematographer, and concluded on October 17.

== Music ==
French electronic and film score duo Double Danger, consisting of musicians Douglas Cavanna and Xavier Caux, was assigned to compose the musical score for the film. The project marks their second major collaboration with the film's director, Vaniček, following their work on Infested. The official soundtrack album was released digitally on July 3, 2026, by WaterTower Music, ahead of the film's general theatrical release.

Track listing
No.	Title	Length
1.	"Behind Ruin and Hex"	1:29
2.	"This Lake Story"	3:52
3.	"We Found You"	1:47
4.	"Evil Dead Burn"	0:51
5.	"Goodbye to My Son"	1:35
6.	"We Got Married Here"	1:08
7.	"We're Inside"	2:28
8.	"Down Below"	3:57
9.	"Let Her Go"	2:36
10.	"Farewell"	1:41
11.	"Kunda"	2:21
12.	"To Your Perfect Family"	2:27
13.	"You Should Be Dead"	1:38
14.	"Just Standing There"	1:11
15.	"Open the Door"	2:58
16.	"Stop Cuddling the Boy"	1:34
17.	"Boo!"	2:18
18.	"You'll All Die Tonight"	1:19
19.	"The Book of the Dead"	1:32
20.	"Without Your Family, You're Nothing"	3:55
21.	"Everything's Better Now"	2:30
22.	"Where Is It?"	2:27
23.	"Alice"	0:47
24.	"Don't Turn a Deaf Ear"	3:12
25.	"You Knew"	4:25
26.	"Wrong One"	2:05
27.	"Kandar"	0:51
28.	"F*ck Your Family"	1:42
29.	"Without Me, You're Nothing"	2:46
30.	"I Won't Let You Live Without Me"	3:06
31.	"That's Not Enough"	2:18
32.	"Paradis" (featuring Double Danger and Chilla)	3:14
Total length:		72:16

== Release ==
=== Theatrical ===
Evil Dead Burn was theatrically released in the U.S. on July 10, 2026. The film was originally set to be released on July 24, 2026.

Warner Bros. Pictures released the film domestically while Sony Pictures Releasing International (under its Screen Gems banner) handled international territories, excluding the United Kingdom (StudioCanal UK), France (Metropolitan Filmexport), and Russia (Volga). An advanced screening of the film was hosted on February 24, 2026.

=== Home media ===
Evil Dead Burn was released on Digital HD on August 4, 2026, and on Ultra HD Blu-ray, Blu-ray, and DVD on September 22, 2026.

== Reception ==
=== Box office ===
Evil Dead Burn grossed $32.2 million in the United States and Canada, and $40.1 million in other territories, for a worldwide total of $72.4 million.

In the U.S. and Canada, Evil Dead Burn was released alongside Moana, and was projected to gross around $15–$20 million during its opening weekend. The film earned $2.3 million from Thursday night previews. It went on to debut to $13.7 million in its opening weekend, finishing in fourth at the box office. In its second weekend, the film dropped 64% and made $5 million.

=== Critical response ===
Evil Dead Burn received generally positive reviews. On the review aggregator website Rotten Tomatoes, 70% of 211 critics gave the film a positive review with an average rating of 6.3/10. The website's consensus reads: "Sébastien Vaniček spills guts with glory in this latest installment of Evil Dead, featuring the meanest, nastiest, and ickiest chapter that is sure to leave fans with a wickedly satisfying Burn for more." Metacritic assigned the film a weighted average score of 54 out of 100 based on 36 critics, indicating "mixed or average" reviews. On AlloCiné, the film received an average rating of 3.6 out of 5, based on 30 reviews, from French critics. Audiences polled by CinemaScore gave the film an average grade of "B" on an A+ to F scale.

Writing for IndieWire, Alison Foreman commended the film for expanding the possibilities of the franchise, writing that Vaniček "doesn't reinvent Evil Dead, but he does reinvent how an Evil Dead movie can feel." Peter Debruge of Variety described the film as "an effective piece of gross-out Guignol", praising its practical effects and arguing that it should appeal to fans of the franchise's visceral horror. RogerEbert.com's Brian Tallerico gave the film two out of four stars. He criticized its excessive brutality and visual style, describing it as "for completists only."
