= Dominic Sessa =

American actor (born 2002)

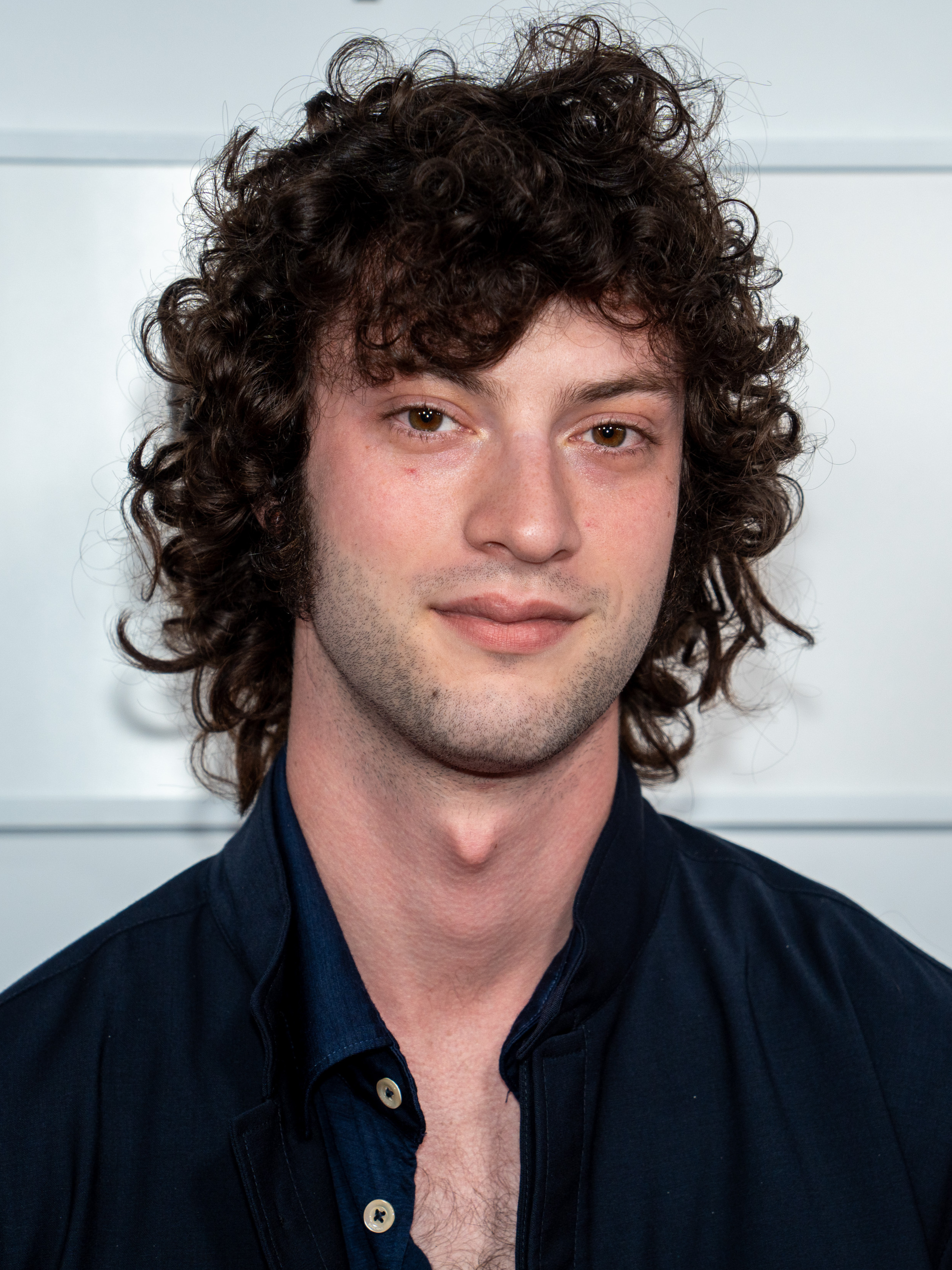
- Sessa in 2025
- Born: October 25, 2002 (age 24); Cherry Hill, New Jersey, US
- Occupation: Actor
- Years active: 2023–present

Dominic Sessa (born October 25, 2002) is an American actor. He made his film debut with a breakthrough role in Alexander Payne's Christmas comedy drama film The Holdovers (2023), for which he won the Critics' Choice Movie Award for Best Young Performer and earned a nomination for the BAFTA Award for Best Actor in a Supporting Role. Sessa next appeared in the third installment of the Now You See Me film series and portrayed a young Anthony Bourdain in the biographical film Tony (2026).

== Life and career ==
Dominic Sessa was born in Cherry Hill, New Jersey, on October 25, 2002, and grew up in Egg Harbor Township and Ocean City. He is of Italian descent and has a sister. His mother was a teacher, while his father worked in payroll before his death in 2017. Sessa practiced ice hockey, ballet, and gymnastics from a young age. He attended Alder Avenue Middle School and, from the tenth grade onward, received a scholarship to attend the college-preparatory school Deerfield Academy in Deerfield, Massachusetts. He enrolled with plans to play ice hockey for the school, but a broken femur sustained before the start of his freshman season prevented him from participating in the sport and led to him joining drama classes instead. He initially struggled but later came to enjoy the classes, acting in student productions of the plays Antigone and Rumors in addition to a radio play of Frankenstein. He also joined the school's a cappella group. At the time, Sessa did not consider pursuing acting as a career and initially applied to college to study English literature.

In 2021, Sessa attended a casting call at Deerfield for student roles, including that of the co-protagonist Angus Tully, in the comedy drama The Holdovers, a film about a teacher having to chaperone students at a New England boarding school during Christmas break in 1970. He made a positive impression on the casting director, Susan Shopmaker, who arranged for him a second audition with the director, Alexander Payne. Although Payne had imagined someone younger in the role of Tully, he believed that Sessa had potential and scheduled several callbacks, coaching him into a more natural performance. Payne decided to cast Sessa after participating in a Zoom call for a script reading session with him and his co-star Paul Giamatti.

To prepare for the role, Sessa studied the script for two months and watched films from the period suggested by Payne, including The Graduate (1967), Harold and Maude (1971), Paper Moon (1973), and The Last Detail (1973). While filming The Holdovers, Sessa was admitted to the Carnegie Mellon School of Drama; he completed his freshman year and subsequently took a leave of absence. Released in 2023, the film grossed $46 million and received positive reviews that named Sessa its breakout star. (Note: Attributed to multiple references:) A critic for the Roger Ebert website said that Sessa had "the energy of [...] a leading man and a quirky character actor at the same time". The performance earned Sessa the Critics' Choice Movie Award for Best Young Performer, the Independent Spirit Award for Best Breakthrough Performance, and a nomination for the British Academy Film Award for Best Actor in a Supporting Role.

Sessa next appeared in the Rose Byrne-led drama film Tow (2025) and featured in advertisements for the brands Yves Saint Laurent and J. Crew. He played a magician in the third installment of the Now You See Me film series, titled Now You See Me: Now You Don't (2025), which became a box-office hit. Critics appreciated the franchise's new generation of protagonists, portrayed by Sessa, Ariana Greenblatt, and Justice Smith, with the Los Angeles Times describing Sessa as particularly "charming" in the role. Sessa appeared in the Michelle Pfeiffer-led Christmas comedy film Oh. What. Fun. (2025), which received negative reviews.

In 2026, Sessa starred as the celebrity chef Anthony Bourdain in the biographical film Tony, set in the summer of 1975 in Provincetown, Massachusetts, before Bourdain chose to pursue a culinary career. For the role, Sessa read Bourdain's books, watched his television shows, and drew upon his own experience working in a bakery. He also learned about the inner workings of restaurants from New York owners introduced to him by the chef Eli Sussman. Sessa stated that he tried to set aside the weight of Bourdain's later fame and described him in the production as a "young man who's [...] figuring it out". The director, Matt Johnson, noted the parallels between Sessa and Bourdain's lives and incorporated Sessa's feedback into the screenplay, commenting: "More than any movie I've ever made, this film was a partnership with an actor." Critics praised Sessa's portrayal of the character's multifaceted nature, with some describing the performance as a "star-making moment".

Sessa is set to star in Weston Razooli's action film Shades of Paradise, which was filmed in Spain.

== Filmography ==
Key
†	Denotes films that have not yet been released

Year	Title	Role	Notes
2023	The Holdovers	Angus Tully	
2025	Tow	Kevin Eggers	
2025	Now You See Me: Now You Don't	Bosco LeRoy	
2025	Oh. What. Fun.	Sammy Clauster	
2026	Tony	Anthony "Tony" Bourdain	
2027	Shades of Paradise †		Post-production
2028	Miami Vice '85 †		Filming

== Awards and nominations ==
Year	Award	Category	Nominated work	Result	Ref.
2023	Chicago Film Critics Association	Most Promising Performer	The Holdovers	Nominated	
2023	Dallas–Fort Worth Film Critics Association	Best Supporting Actor	The Holdovers	5th place	
2023	Florida Film Critics Circle	Best Supporting Actor	The Holdovers	Nominated	
2023	Florida Film Critics Circle	Breakout Award	The Holdovers	Nominated	
2023	Georgia Film Critics Association	Breakthrough Award	The Holdovers	Won	
2023	Heartland International Film Festival	Pioneering Spirit: Rising Star Award	The Holdovers	Won	
2023	North Texas Film Critics Association	Best Newcomer	The Holdovers	Won	
2023	North Texas Film Critics Association	Best Supporting Actor	The Holdovers	Nominated	
2023	St. Louis Film Critics Association	Best Supporting Actor	The Holdovers	Nominated	
2023	Toronto Film Critics Association	Best Breakthrough Performance	The Holdovers	Runner-up	
2023	Washington D.C. Area Film Critics Association	Best Supporting Actor	The Holdovers	Nominated	
2023	Washington D.C. Area Film Critics Association	Best Youth Performance	The Holdovers	Won	
2024	Astra Film Awards	Best Supporting Actor	The Holdovers	Nominated	
2024	Austin Film Critics Association	Breakthrough Artist Award	The Holdovers	Nominated	
2024	British Academy Film Awards	Best Actor in a Supporting Role	The Holdovers	Nominated	
2024	Critics' Choice Awards	Best Young Performer	The Holdovers	Won	
2024	Dorian Awards	Rising Star Award	The Holdovers	Nominated	
2024	Houston Film Critics Society	Best Supporting Actor	The Holdovers	Nominated	
2024	International Cinephile Society	Breakthrough Performance	The Holdovers	Nominated	
2024	Independent Spirit Awards	Best Breakthrough Performance	The Holdovers	Won	
2024	London Film Critics' Circle	Breakthrough Performer of the Year	The Holdovers	Nominated	
2024	Music City Film Critics Association	Best Young Actor	The Holdovers	Won	
2024	Satellite Awards	Best Supporting Actor	The Holdovers	Nominated	
2024	Utah Film Critics Association	Best Supporting Performance, Male	The Holdovers	Won	
