= The Last Straw =

The last straw is an idiom referring to the straw that broke the camel's back.

The Last Straw may refer to:

- The Last Straw (1920 film), an American silent western film
- The Last Straw (1987 film), a Canadian comedy film
- The Last Straw (2008 film), an American documentary film of the last live performance of Charles Bukowski reading his poetry
- Last Straw, a 2023 American horror film
- The Last Staw (play), a 1937 comedy play by Edward Percy and Reginald Denham
- The Last Straw (band), an Australian jazz ensemble
- "The Last Straw" (George and Mildred), a 1979 television episode
- Diary of a Wimpy Kid: The Last Straw, a novel by American author and cartoonist Jeff Kinney
