= Riddle of Fire =

2023 fantasy film

- Film poster
- Directed by: Weston Razooli
- Written by: Weston Razooli
- Produced by: David Atrakchi
- Starring: Lio Tipton; Charles Halford; Lorelei Olivia Mote; Charlie Stover; Phoebe Ferro; Skyler Peters
- Cinematography: Jake Mitchell
- Production companies: ANAXIA; Fulldawa Films
- Distributed by: Yellow Veil Pictures; Vinegar Syndrome
- Release dates: 20 May 2023 (Cannes); 7 September 2023 (Toronto); 22 March 2024 (United States)
- Running time: 113 minutes
- Country: United States
- Box office: $274,682

Riddle of Fire is a 2023 fantasy film written and directed by Weston Razooli and starring Skyler Peters, Phoebe Ferro, and Charlie Stover. Variety has described the film as a "faux-’70s children’s fantasy adventure."

== Synopsis ==
Brothers Jodie and Hazel, along with their friend Alice, devise a scheme to steal a video game from a nearby warehouse. They manage to get away with the game but find themselves unable to play the game because they do not know the password to the television. Jodie and Hazel's mother agrees to tell the boys the password if they bring her a blueberry pie. Unable to secure a pie from the local pie-maker, they get her recipe and set out to find the ingredients. While trying to get eggs, the last carton is taken by John Redrye of the Enchanted Blade Gang.

They follow him to the home of the gang, led by Anna-Freya Hollyhock, who may be a witch. They stowaway in the back of their truck and ultimately find themselves on an adventure where they team up with Anna-Freya's daughter, Petal, to find a speckled egg, make the blueberry pie, and play their video game.

== Cast ==
- Phoebe Ferro as Alice
- Skyler Peters as Jodie A'Dale
- Charlie Stover as Hazel A'Dale
- Danielle Hoetmer as Julie A'Dale
- Lio Tipton as Anna-Freya Hollyhock
- Charles Halford as John Redrye
- Lorelei Mote as Petal Hollyhock
- Weston Razooli as Marty Hollyhock
- Rachel Browne as Suds Hollyhock
- Andrea Browne as Kels Hollyhock
- Austin Archer as Chip
- Abigail Sakari as Otomo Angel
- Chuck Marra as Otomo Pete
- Lonzo Liggins as Officer Neff
- Sorhab Mirmont as DJ März
- Kent Richards as Officer Lucas

== Production ==
Razooli chose a childhood adventure film for his debut, because of all his scripts it seemed the easiest to produce on a low budget. "For some reason I thought 'I'm just gonna write a simple script; it's gonna be four kids on an adventure in the woods, and I'll shoot it in my hometown, and it'll be really cheap and easy.' And it's like, no, it's not that at all." Razooli decided to subtitle the dialogue of the character Jodi when he discovered on the first day of shooting that child actor Skylar Peters mumbled his lines.

Riddle of Fire was shot on 16 mm film by cinematographer Jake L. Mitchell to emulate the aesthetic of 1970s Disney movies that served as the film's inspiration. Filming took place in Park City, Utah, over a twenty-day period.

== Release ==
Riddle of Fire premiered in the Directors' Fortnight portion of the Cannes Film Festival and later screened at that year's Toronto International Film Festival and Fantastic Fest. In 2024, Riddle of Fire received a theatrical run in the United States, distributed by Yellow Veil Pictures and Vinegar Syndrome.

== Reception ==
=== Critical response ===
On the review aggregator website Rotten Tomatoes, 79% of 56 critics' reviews are positive, with an average rating of 6.8/10. The website's consensus reads: "With its charmingly childlike perspective, Riddle of Fire channels the spirit of youthful adventure with enough exuberance to overcome an occasionally shaggy structure." Metacritic, which uses a weighted average, assigned the film a score of 58 out of 100, based on 14 critics, indicating "mixed or average" reviews.

=== Accolades ===
| Award | Date | Category | Recipient | Result | Ref. |
|---|---|---|---|---|---|
| Cannes Film Festival | March 25, 2023 | Camera d'Or | Riddle of Fire | Nominated | |
| Cannes Film Festival | March 25, 2023 | Cannes' Directors' Fortnight | Riddle of Fire | Nominated | |
| Ghent Film Festival | October 21, 2023 | Official Competition | Riddle of Fire | Nominated | |
| Lisbon & Estoril Film Festival | November 17, 2023 | Official Competition | Riddle of Fire | Nominated | |
| Molodist International Film Festival | October 21, 2023 | Teen Screen Competition | Riddle of Fire | Nominated | |
| Mon Premier Festival | October 31, 2023 | Audience Award for Best Film | Riddle of Fire | Nominated | |
| Piccolo Grande Cinema | November 12, 2023 | International Competition | Riddle of Fire | Nominated | |
| Saskatoon Fantastic Film Festival | November 25, 2023 | Audience Choice Award | Riddle of Fire | Won | |
| Sitges Film Festival | October 15, 2023 | Special Mention | Riddle of Fire | Won | |
| Warsaw International Film Festival | October 15, 2023 | Free Spirit Award | Weston Razooli | Won | |
