= I'm Not a Robot (film) =

2023 short film

- Promotional poster
- Dutch: Ik ben geen robot
- Directed by: Victoria Warmerdam
- Written by: Victoria Warmerdam
- Produced by: Henry Gillet; Wim Goossens; Trent
- Starring: Ellen Parren; Henry van Loon; Thekla Reuten; Juliette van Ardenne; Asma El Mouden
- Cinematography: Martijn van Broekhuizen
- Edited by: Michiel Boesveldt
- Music by: Merlijn Snitker
- Production companies: OAK Motion Pictures; The Y-House; Bulletproof Cupid
- Distributed by: The New Yorker
- Release date: 23 September 2023 (NFF)
- Running time: 22 minutes
- Countries: Belgium; Netherlands
- Language: Dutch

I'm Not a Robot (Dutch: Ik ben geen robot) is a 2023 Dutch-language short science fiction drama film written and directed by Victoria Warmerdam. It stars Ellen Parren as a woman who plunges into a strange new reality after she fails a series of CAPTCHA tests.

An international co-production between Belgium and the Netherlands, I'm Not a Robot had its world premiere at the Netherlands Film Festival on 23 September 2023, and was made available for streaming via the YouTube channel of The New Yorker on 15 November 2024. It won the Academy Award for Best Live Action Short Film in 2025, becoming the first Dutch short film to do so.

== Plot ==
Dutch music producer Lara is listening to Scala & Kolacny Brothers' cover of Radiohead's "Creep" at work when a system update forces her to restart her laptop. The update presents her with a series of CAPTCHA tests, which she repeatedly fails despite inputting the correct answers. Frustrated, she calls tech support. The voice on the other end suggests that Lara can't get through because she is a robot and tells her that she would not "be the first to find out this way". The voice hangs up after refusing to assist her.

Lara fails more tests and is then redirected to another test that asks a series of arbitrary questions, including whether she feels like an outsider and whether her partner is wealthy; when she confirms that her parents died in an accident before she was old enough to remember them, the test responds that they most likely never existed. When she completes the test, it concludes that there is an 87% chance she is a robot and welcomes her to the "bot community". Disturbed, she leaves her desk.

Lara videocalls her boyfriend Daniël and tells him the result of the test, but he awkwardly makes an excuse and ends the call. In a work meeting about affirmative action, Lara is distracted as she continually attempts to contact Daniël. He later visits her at work alongside a woman who introduces herself as Pam, who informs Lara that she is indeed a robot and was chosen by Daniël five years earlier to be his girlfriend. Daniël attempts to assure Lara that she still has emotions and autonomy, but she feels used and goes to the roof of the nearby multi-storey car park.

Daniël goes after Lara and begs her not to throw away their relationship. He reveals that the only thing setting Lara apart from a human is that she is programmed to die shortly after Daniël does, since he was unwilling to mourn her "again", but tells her that she still has the freedom to leave him. Lara questions him about his deceased girlfriend Olivia and ponders what would happen if she attempted suicide. Pam appears and asserts that Lara is incapable of ending her life if Daniël doesn't want her to. Desperate, Lara jumps from the roof. Shortly after hitting the ground, she begins to bleed out, but quickly regains consciousness. Credits roll as the cover of "Creep" plays again.

== Cast ==
- Ellen Parren as Lara
- Henry van Loon as Daniël
- Thekla Reuten as Pam
- Juliette van Ardenne as Collega
- Asma El Mouden as Saar
- Sophie Höppener as Sollicitant Billy
- Joep Vermolen as Klusjesman
- Sieger Sloot as Klantenservice medewerker

== Production ==
An international co-production between Belgium and the Netherlands, the film was shot on 2-perf 35 mm with Kodak film stock in an Aaton Penelope camera. The shots featuring the stunt at the end were filmed in 3-perf format with an Arriflex 235 camera. The film was produced with a carbon neutral approach; in addition to ensuring that pre-production and filming were conducted as sustainably as possible under the guidance of a sustainability manager, a food forest was planted in the Netherlands to offset the production's emissions. Principal photography ran from 5–15 May 2023 and took place at locations in Belgium such as Dilbeek, Leuven, and Watermael-Boitsfort. The office scenes were filmed in the CBR Building in Watermael-Boitsfort.

== Release ==
I'm Not a Robot had its world premiere in the Golden Calf Competition at the Netherlands Film Festival on 23 September 2023. It also featured at the 56th Sitges Film Festival in October 2023, the Leuven International Short Film Festival in December 2023, the Australian Flickerfest on 23 January 2024, the 42nd Brussels International Fantastic Film Festival in April 2024, the Palm Springs International Festival of Short Films on 7 June 2024, the 28th Bucheon International Fantastic Film Festival, the 28th Fantasia International Film Festival in Canada in July 2024, and the Oscar-qualifying program of the Bend Film Festival on 11 October 2024.

The film was made available for streaming via the YouTube channel of The New Yorker on 15 November 2024.

== Reception ==
In the autumn of 2023, the film's first English-language review saw I'm Not a Robot receive five stars from independent movie review website Indy Film Library. Critic Jack Benjamin praised Warmerdam's script for satirising contemporary dialogue around artificial intelligence. In particular, he noted that while abstract discussions over the human rights of machines are now taking place, it does so when many people continue to be denied their rights, as "a sizeable chunk of the human world doesn’t actually care if something or someone has feelings".

I'm Not a Robot won the award for Best Short Film at the Bucheon International Fantastic Film Festival in July 2024. It won the Academy Award for Best Live Action Short Film in 2025, becoming the first Dutch short film to win the latter.

== Similar works ==
In 2022, Jason Speir's short film I Am Not a Robot was released with the same theme.

== Accolades ==
Award	Date of ceremony	Category	Recipient(s)	Result	Ref.
Netherlands Film Festival	29 September 2023	Best Leading Role Short Film	Ellen Parren	Nominated	
Sitges Film Festival	15 October 2023	Critic's Jury: Best Short Film in the SOFC	I'm Not a Robot	Won	
Brussels International Fantastic Film Festival	21 April 2024	Silver Méliès	I'm Not a Robot	Won	
Bucheon International Fantastic Film Festival	14 July 2024	Best Short Film	I'm Not a Robot	Won	
Academy Awards	March 2, 2025	Best Live Action Short Film	Victoria Warmerdam and Trent	Won	
