= Weston Razooli =

American filmmaker

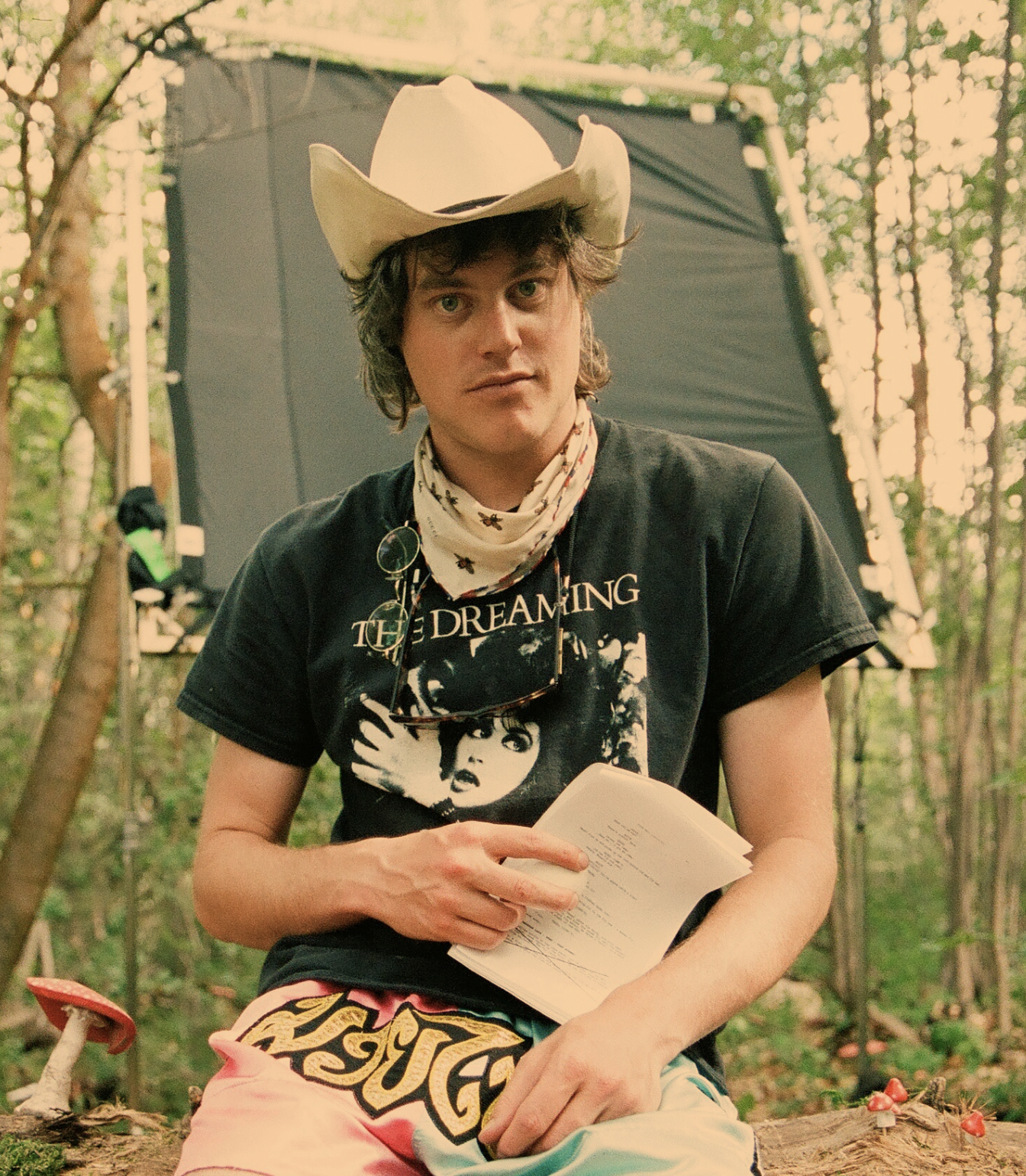
- Razooli directing Riddle of Fire
- Born: Park City, Utah
- Occupation(s): Film director, screenwriter

Weston Razooli is an American filmmaker. His debut feature film, Riddle of Fire, premiered at the 2023 Cannes Film Festival.

== Early life and education ==
Razooli was born and raised in Park City, Utah. He graduated from California College of the Arts in San Francisco.

== Career ==
In 2015, Razooli founded the production company Anaxia. His 2023 feature film debut, Riddle of Fire, premiered in the Directors' Fortnight section of the Cannes Film Festival, where it was eligible for the Camera d'Or.

== Filmography ==
Year	Title	Ref.
2023	Riddle of Fire	

== Awards and nominations ==
Year	Award	Category	Nominated work	Result	Ref.
2023	Cannes Film Festival	Directors' Fortnight	Riddle of Fire	Nominated	
2023	Cannes Film Festival	Camera d'Or	Riddle of Fire	Nominated	
2024	Buenos Aires Independent Film Festival	Best International Film	Riddle of Fire	Won	

=== Accolades ===
Award	Date	Category	Recipient	Result	Ref.
Cannes Film Festival	March 25, 2023	Camera d'Or	Riddle of Fire	Nominated	
Cannes Film Festival	March 25, 2023	Cannes' Directors' Fortnight	Riddle of Fire	Nominated	
Ghent Film Festival	October 21, 2023	Official Competition	Riddle of Fire	Nominated	
Lisbon & Estoril Film Festival	November 17, 2023	Official Competition	Riddle of Fire	Nominated	
Molodist International Film Festival	October 21, 2023	Teen Screen Competition	Riddle of Fire	Nominated	
Mon Premier Festival	October 31, 2023	Audience Award for Best Film	Riddle of Fire	Nominated	
Piccolo Grande Cinema	November 12, 2023	International Competition	Riddle of Fire	Nominated	
Saskatoon Fantastic Film Festival	November 25, 2023	Audience Choice Award	Riddle of Fire	Won	
Sitges Film Festival	October 15, 2023	Special Mention	Riddle of Fire	Won	
Warsaw International Film Festival	October 15, 2023	Free Spirit Award	Weston Razooli	Won	
