= Théo Christine =

French actor (born 1996)

- Born: 1996 (age 29–30); La Roche-sur-Yon, France
- Occupation: Actor
- Years active: 2017–present

Théo Christine (born 1996) is a French television and film actor.

== Early life ==
Born in La Roche-sur-Yon, Vendée in 1996, he grew up in Saint-Gilles-Croix-de-Vie, and his time growing-up was split between Vendée and Martinique, where his father was born. He initially pursued a career in surfing. He moved to Paris in 2015, where he began acting training at the Cours Florent. He previously had his first experience in show business appearing as an extra when he was 13 years old in Saint-Gilles-Croix-de-Vie for Lulu femme nue starring Karin Viard.

== Career ==
He had an early role in the French television series Skam France. He portrayed Joeystarr in French musical biopic Suprêmes. He also appeared in 2020 comedy drama film My Best Part.

He could be seen in the 2022 British thriller film Summit Fever alongside Ryan Phillipe. He had a leading role in French horror film Infested in 2023. He played a racing driver in the 2023 American sports film Gran Turismo. He also appeared in the French film Ollie by Antoine Besse, Magma with Marina Foïs, and he also appeared in BRI, a television series on Canal+.

He could be seen as Sammy in the French film To Live, to Die, to Live Again, which had its world premiere on 23 May 2024 at the Cannes Premiere section of the 2024 Cannes Film Festival, where it was nominated for the Queer Palm.

It was reported in May 2025 that he was included alongside Omar Sy, Vincent Cassel, François Civil in the cast of upcoming epic adventure film Dumas: Black Devil.

== Partial filmography ==
Key
†	Denotes works that have not yet been released

Year	Title	Role	Notes
2017	Bienvenue à Nimbao	Daniel Junior	TV film
2018-2019	Skam France	Alexandre	34 episodes
2020	My Best Part	Kevin	Film
2021	Suprêmes	Didier Morville (JoeyStarr)	Film
2022	Summit Fever	Rudi	Film
2022	BRI	Socrate	8 episodes
2023	Gran Turismo	Marcel Durand	Film
2023	Infested	Kaleb	Film
2024	To Live, to Die, to Live Again	Sammy	Film
2024	Ollie		
2024	Magma	Aime Lubin	
2026	Lupin	Raoul Diop	Series 4
2027	Dumas: Black Devil†		
