= I'll Crush Y'all =

- Theatrical release poster
- Spanish: Os reviento
- Directed by: Kike Narcea
- Written by: Kike Narcea
- Produced by: Jaime Arnaiz; Kiko Prada; Jesús Loniego; Javi Prada; Bruno Martín
- Starring: Mario Mayo; Diego Paris; Fabia Castro; Raúl Jiménez; Fernando Gil; Antonio Mayans
- Cinematography: Alberto Pareja
- Edited by: Ángel Pazos; Kike Narcea
- Music by: Daniel Maldonado "Sam"
- Production companies: JAR Producciones; The Other Side Films; Loniego Films; Gamera Studios; Bruno Martín Ojeda
- Distributed by: The Other Side Films
- Release dates: September 2023 (Fantastic Fest); 13 September 2024 (Spain)
- Country: Spain
- Language: Spanish

I'll Crush Y'all (Spanish: Os reviento) is a 2023 Spanish independent action film written and directed by Kike Narcea starring Mario Mayo.

== Plot ==
Former boxer/inmate Gabriel lives a secluded life in an isolate village with his dog and his father, but the past comes to haunt him, and is forced to use his talent at beating the crap out of people to solve his problems.

== Cast ==
- Mario Mayo as Gabriel, "Tarado"
- Antonio Mayans as Tino
- Ana Márquez as Sandra
- Miguel Lago Casal as subinspector Blanco
- Rut Santamaría
- Fernando Gil as Rafa Nielsen
- Raúl Jiménez as Chiri
- Diego París as Tinín
- Fabia Castro as Estefa
- Javier Botet as supervisor de libertad condicional ('parole supervisor')
- Lone Fleming as madre de Rafa ('Rafa's mother')

== Production ==
I'll Crush Y'all is an independent production by JAR Producciones, Bruno Martín, The OtherSide Films, Loniego Films, and Gamera Studios. The company founded by Reyes Abades took over special effects.

== Release ==
The film screened at the 2023 Fantastic Fest. It also made it to the slate of the Buried Alive Horror Film Festival and the 56th Sitges Film Festival (for its European premiere). Distributed by The Other Side Films, it was released theatrically in Spain on 13 September 2024.

== Accolades ==
Year	Award	Category	Nominee(s)	Result	Ref.
2023	2023 Fantastic Fest	Audience Award		Won	
2023	56th Sitges Film Festival	Midnight X-treme section Audience Award		Won	

== See also ==
- List of Spanish films of 2024
