= Dumas: Black Devil =

French action drama film

- Directed by: Ladj Ly
- Screenplay by: Anne Abitbol; Dan Franck; Thomas Bidegain
- Based on: Le Premier Dumas by Ruben del Rincón
- Produced by: Dimitri Rassam; Toufik Ayadi; Christophe Barral
- Starring: Théo Christine; Omar Sy; Vincent Cassel; Francois Civil
- Cinematography: Julien Poupard
- Production companies: Chapter 2; Srab Films
- Country: France

Dumas: Black Devil is an upcoming historical epic adventure French film directed by Ladj Ly and produced by Chapter 2 and Srab Films. It is starring Omar Sy, Vincent Cassel, François Civil and Theo Christine. It is scheduled for release in October 2027.

== Premise ==
The true story of 18th century Frenchman Thomas Alexandre Davy de la Pailleterie Dumas, born in the Caribbean the son of an African slave, Marie-Cessette Dumas, and a French noble man, Marquis Alexandre Antoine Davy de la Pailleterie, who rose to become the first black general of the French army and earned the nickname "Black Devil", but whose role in the French Revolution was underplayed to the extent he was denied a full pension and legion of honor by Napoleon Bonaparte. He was also the father of Alexandre Dumas.

== Cast ==
- Théo Christine
- Omar Sy
- Vincent Cassel
- Francois Civil
- Galatéa Bellugi
- Steve Tientcheu
- Alexis Manenti
- Abdramane Diakité
- Jennifer Heylen
- Idir Azougli

== Production ==
The film is directed by Ladj Ly and produced by Dimitri Rassam for Chapter 2 and Toufik Ayadi and Christophe Barral for Srab Films, in co-production with Lyly Films and Carrousel Studios. Library Pictures International is co-financing. The film is written by Anne Abitbol, Dan Franck and Thomas Bidegain, and loosely adapted from Salva Rubio and the Ruben del Rincón three-volume graphic novel Le Premier Dumas.

The cast reported in May 2025 included Omar Sy, Vincent Cassel, François Civil and Théo Christine and later also included Galatéa Bellugi, Steve Tientcheu, Alexis Manenti, Abdramane Diakité, Jennifer Heylen and Idir Azougli.

Principal photography took place in 2026 with filming locations including Morocco, Paris, Lyon, the Alps, the Oise and Martinique. Julien Poupard was the director of photography. The film had entered post-production by July 2026 following a five-month shoot.

== Release ==
The film is scheduled for release in France on 13 October 2027.
