= The Wilderness (2025 film) =

2025 American drama film

- Theatrical release poster
- Directed by: Spencer King
- Written by: Spencer King
- Produced by: Aaron Paul; Amy Berg; Larissa Beck; Lily Blavin; Hunter Doohan; Spencer King
- Starring: Hunter Doohan; Lamar Johnson; Aaron Holliday; Matt Gomez Hidaka; Vinessa Shaw; Liana Liberato; Sam Jaeger
- Cinematography: Sean Mouton
- Edited by: Amir Mosallaie
- Music by: Isaac Middleton
- Production companies: Disarming Films; Lighting Strikes Productions
- Distributed by: Dark Star Pictures
- Release date: October 17, 2025
- Country: United States
- Language: English

The Wilderness is a 2025 American drama film written, directed, and produced by Spencer King. It stars Hunter Doohan, Lamar Johnson, Aaron Holliday, Matt Gomez Hidaka, Vinessa Shaw, Liana Liberato and Sam Jaeger. Aaron Paul and Amy Berg serve as producers.

It was released on October 17, 2025, by Dark Star Pictures.

== Plot ==
A group of troubled boys are kidnapped from their homes and taken deep into the unforgiving Utah desert and forced to attend a wilderness therapy program. Cut off from the outside world, their only path home lies in gaining the favor of the cryptic program director—whose intentions are anything but healing. As rehabilitation slips into manipulation, the boys must choose: endure the program or find a way out.

== Cast ==
- Hunter Doohan as Ed
- Lamar Johnson as Miles
- Aaron Holliday as Levi
- Matt Gomez Hidaka as Niko
- Vinessa Shaw as Audrey
- Liana Liberato as Charlotte
- Sam Jaeger as James
- Sean Avery as Rich
- James LeGros as Arch

== Production ==
Principal photography took place in Utah.

== Release ==
In June 2025, Dark Star Pictures acquired distribution rights to the film. It was released on October 17, 2025.
