= When Evil Lurks =

2023 film by Demián Rugna

- Promotional release poster
- Directed by: Demián Rugna
- Written by: Demián Rugna
- Produced by: Fernando Díaz
- Starring: Ezequiel Rodríguez; Demián Salomon; Luis Ziembrowski; Silvia Sabater; Marcelo Michinaux
- Cinematography: Mariano Suárez
- Edited by: Lionel Cornistein
- Music by: Pablo Fuu
- Production companies: Shudder; Aramos Cine; Machaco Films
- Distributed by: IFC Films; Shudder; BF Paris S.R.L. (Arg.)
- Release dates: September 13, 2023 (TIFF); October 6, 2023 (United States); November 9, 2023 (Argentina)
- Running time: 99 minutes
- Countries: Argentina; United States
- Language: Spanish
- Box office: US$2.1 million

When Evil Lurks (Spanish: Cuando acecha la maldad) is a 2023 supernatural horror film written and directed by Demián Rugna. An international co-production of Argentina and the United States, the film stars Ezequiel Rodríguez, Demián Salomon, Luis Ziembrowski, Silvia Sabater and Marcelo Michinaux. The film follows two brothers facing a spreading demonic possession in a rural town.

When Evil Lurks premiered at the Toronto International Film Festival (TIFF) on September 16, 2023. It received a theatrical release by IFC Films on October 6, and debuted on the streaming service Shudder on October 27.

== Plot ==
The morning after hearing gunshots in the woods near the land where they work, brothers Pedro and Jaime discover a disemboweled corpse, which leads them to a nearby shack where María Elena, an elderly woman, and her two sons, Uriel and Eduardo, are in hiding. Uriel has become a "Rotten", a being possessed by an unborn demon awaiting physical birth. The corpse was that of a "Cleaner", a professional who was to kill Uriel and exorcise the demon before it could possess others.

The authorities dismiss the demon as not their problem. The landowner, Ruiz, suggests removing Uriel from the shack and dumping him away from his land. After driving several hundred kilometers, the men realize that Uriel has fallen off the truck somewhere along the way. Unable to find him, Ruiz declares the matter resolved and returns home. The next morning, one of Ruiz's goats has become possessed. Ruiz's pregnant wife Jimena warns against using guns because they will only spread the infectious possession, but Ruiz shoots the animal with his shotgun. A possessed Jimena then kills Ruiz and commits suicide. That night, Eduardo knocks on Pedro and Jaime's door. Eduardo's mother disappeared after the men took Uriel, and he found Ruiz and Jimena dead. Afraid to return to his shack alone, he begs the men to let him stay the night. Pedro allows Eduardo to sleep in their shed, provided that he surrenders his pistol and promises to leave at sunrise.

The next morning, Jaime and Pedro plan to leave town with their families to be safe. Jaime gets their mother Sara while Pedro goes to his ex-wife Sabrina and his two children, Santino and Jair. Sabrina lives with Leonardo, her new husband. The family dog, who previously licked Pedro's demon-mucked clothes, mauls Vicky (Leonardo and Sabrina's daughter) dragging her outside. Leonardo shoots the dog despite Pedro's warning. Pedro returns to Sabrina and discovers that Vicky is back, and seemingly normal. As Pedro steals a car and drives away with his sons, a possessed Leonardo rams his truck into Sabrina and Vicky, who later dances gleefully.

After Pedro picks up Jaime and Sara, the assembled family leaves town. They meet up with Mirtha, a former Cleaner and Jaime's acquaintance from the city, who invites them to stay overnight. Mirtha warns Jaime about Jair, who exhibits signs of possession. Jaime dismisses this as related to Jair's autism. Mirtha explains that they must find and kill Uriel using the appropriate ritual to prevent the demon from being fully born. Sabrina eventually kidnaps Santino. Jaime chases after her while Mirtha and Pedro take Mirtha's truck to search for Uriel. Jaime reaches Sabrina only to find that she has killed Santino and is eating his brains. Furious, he runs Sabrina down and pins her to a tree. Sara stays behind to wait with Jair, who begins walking unassisted and speaking without impediment.

Pedro and Mirtha's search leads to a schoolhouse filled with possessed children who killed all the nearby adults and worked to conceal Uriel. Uriel is hidden under an auditorium's stage, and Pedro tries to unearth him as Mirtha sets up the exorcising ritual. Losing his patience and believing that a nearby fire axe might help dismember and move Uriel, Pedro runs to the office only to be locked in by the children. While he is occupied, the children kill Mirtha and dismantle her equipment. Getting back to the auditorium too late to save Mirtha, an angry Pedro beats Uriel to death. The demon is then born out of Uriel's corpse, appearing as a nude, blood-covered child. The demon taunts Pedro, marking him with streaks of blood and sparing his life as he leaves, followed by the children.

Pedro and Jaime reunite at Mirtha's house, collect Jair and return home. Inspecting the property, Jaime finds the possessed Eduardo, who admits to killing and eating the original Cleaner four days before. He did the same thing to his own mother and alludes that Sara suffered a similar fate. Inside, Pedro feeds Jair ice cream. However, Jair chokes, and proceeds to cough up Sara's hair and necklace. Pedro walks outside, collapses, and wails.

== Cast ==
- Ezequiel Rodríguez as Pedro Yazurlo
- Demián Salomon as Jaime "Jimi" Yazurlo, Pedro's younger brother
- Silvina Sabater as Mirtha
- Luis Ziembrowski as Armando Ruiz
- Marcelo Michinaux as Santino Yazurlo, Pedro's son
- Emilio Vodanovich as Jair Yazurlo, Pedro's son
- Virginia Garófalo as Sabrina, Pedro's ex-wife
- Paula Rubinsztein as Sara
- Lucrecia Nirón Talazac as Vicky
- Isabel Quinteros as María Elena Gómez
- Desirée Salgueiro as Jimena Ruiz
- Federico Liss as Leonardo "Leo"

== Production ==
In 2021, the screenplay for When Evil Lurks won the Runner Up Prize at the Sitges Pitchbox, an international pitch event hosted by Filmarket Hub and the 56th Sitges Film Festival.

When Evil Lurks is produced by Shudder and La Puerta Roja, the latter a joint venture partnership between the Argentine-based Aramos Cine and Machaco Films. It is Shudder's first Spanish-language production. Filming took place in 2022.

== Release ==
During the film's post-production, an early market screening was held for the film at Ventana Sur in Puerto Madero, Buenos Aires, where it won the Blood Window Screenings Award.

The film premiered at the Toronto International Film Festival (TIFF) on September 13, 2023 as part of the festival's "Midnight Madness" section. Paris-based company Charades managed international sales for the film at the festival.

The film was theatrically released by IFC Films on October 6, followed by a release on the Shudder streaming service on October 27.

== Reception ==
On the review aggregator website Rotten Tomatoes, 97% of 121 critics' reviews are positive, with an average rating of 7.8/10. The website's consensus reads: "A hard-hitting horror film whose surface-level frights are just as engaging as its thematic concerns, When Evil Lurks marks a viscerally unsettling addition to the possession horror canon." Metacritic, which uses a weighted average, assigned the film a score of 75 out of 100, based on 14 critics, indicating "generally favorable" reviews.

=== Accolades ===
Award	Date of ceremony	Category	Recipient(s)	Result	Ref.
Sitges Film Festival	October 14, 2023	Best Feature Film	When Evil Lurks	Won	
Sitges Film Festival	October 14, 2023	Blood Window Award for Best Feature Film	When Evil Lurks	Won	
Festival international du film fantastique de Gérardmer	February 2, 2024	Critics' Prize	When Evil Lurks	Won	
Festival international du film fantastique de Gérardmer	February 2, 2024	Audience Award	When Evil Lurks	Won	
Critics' Choice Super Awards	April 4, 2024	Best Horror Movie	When Evil Lurks	Nominated	
Platino Awards	April 20, 2024	Best Sound	Pablo Isola	Nominated	

== Themes ==
In contemporary film studies, the narrative architecture of the feature film has been categorized as a complex socio-environmental allegory of the Argentine interior. Scholarly analyses interpret the grotesque physical manifestations of the "infected" bodies within the plot as a critical somatic metaphor for public health crises and structural violence, drawing parallels to real-world toxic exposure and state abandonment in rural agricultural communities. Furthermore, critical discourse studies from the Universidad de Salamanca categorize the production as a strategic intersection of folk horror and gore aesthetics; here, the characters' lack of logical or ideological lucidity functions textually to symbolize systemic poverty, institutional decay, and structural vulnerability within contemporary Latin American cinema.

== See also ==
- List of Argentine films of 2023
