= Flies (2023 film) =

- Spanish: Moscas
- Directed by: Aritz Moreno
- Screenplay by: Javier Gullón
- Based on: Que de lejos parecen moscas by Kike Ferrari
- Produced by: Merry Colomer
- Starring: Ernesto Alterio; Mara Bestelli; Tomás Pozzi; Claudio Rissi
- Cinematography: Javier Aguirre Erauso
- Edited by: Raúl López
- Music by: Maite Arroitajauregi Mursego
- Production company: Morena Films
- Distributed by: ViX
- Release date: 6 October 2023 (Sitges)
- Countries: Spain; Argentina
- Language: Spanish

Flies (Spanish: Moscas) is a 2023 black comedy thriller film directed by Aritz Moreno from a screenplay by Javier Gullón based on the novel by Kike Ferrari. It stars Ernesto Alterio.

== Plot ==
Set in Buenos Aires, the plot follows the plight of despicable businessman Luis Machi after finding a corpse in his car's trunk and his attempts of getting rid of the body.

== Cast ==
- Ernesto Alterio as Luis Machi
- Mara Bestelli
- Tomás Pozzi as Cloaca
- Claudio Rissi as Miguel
- Gabriel Fernández

== Production ==
The film is a Morena Films and Pensa&Rocca Spanish-Argentine co-production by Merry Colomer, Daniel Pensa, and Miguel Rocca. It was shot in Buenos Aires.

== Release ==
The film made it to the main competition programme of the 56th Sitges Film Festival, with a screening set for 6 October 2023. Its festival run also included a screening at the Brussels International Fantastic Film Festival (BIFFF) in April 2024.

== Reception ==
Miguel Ángel Romero of Cinemanía rated the film 4 out of 5 stars, declaring it "a major thriller through heart-stopping scenes that make the viewer jump out of the seat".

Alfonso Rivera of Cineuropa deemed the film to ultimately be "some entertainment with socially critical undertones", "because its visual pyrotechnics invite more jovial fun than thoughtful reflection".
