= Tow (film) =

2025 film by Stephanie Laing

- Theatrical release poster
- Directed by: Stephanie Laing
- Written by: Jonathan Keasey; Brant Boivin
- Produced by: Rose Byrne; Stephanie Laing; Brent Stiefel; Justin Lothrop; Brian O'Shea; Danyelle Foord; Josh Ricks; Samantha Nisenboim
- Starring: Rose Byrne; Dominic Sessa; Simon Rex; Demi Lovato; Ariana DeBose; Octavia Spencer
- Cinematography: Vanja Černjul
- Edited by: Joe Klotz; Sarah Flack; Max Miller
- Music by: Este Haim; Nathan Barr
- Production companies: Cake or Death Pictures; Votiv Films; The Exchange
- Distributed by: Vertical; Roadside Attractions
- Release dates: June 7, 2025 (Tribeca Festival); March 20, 2026 (United States)
- Running time: 105 minutes
- Country: United States
- Language: English
- Box office: $291,795

Tow is a 2025 American drama film directed by Stephanie Laing, written by Jonathan Keasey and Brant Boivin, and starring Rose Byrne, Dominic Sessa, Demi Lovato, Ariana DeBose, Octavia Spencer, Simon Rex, and Elsie Fisher.

The film is based on a 2018 report in the The Seattle Times about a homeless woman named Amanda Ogle and her legal battle against the local government to reclaim her vehicle that she was living in, but was stolen and then towed.

The film premiered at the 2025 Tribeca Festival on June 7, 2025, and it was released in the United States on March 20, 2026.

== Premise ==
Amanda Ogle, a homeless Seattle woman, fights her way out of "tow-company hell" to reclaim the car that had held her life together after receiving a tow bill for $21,634.

== Cast ==
- Rose Byrne as Amanda Ogle
- Dominic Sessa as Kevin, Amanda's lawyer
- Demi Lovato as Nova, a homeless shelter resident
- Ariana DeBose as Denise, a homeless shelter resident
- Octavia Spencer as Barb, manager of a homeless shelter for women
- Simon Rex as Cliff, a tow truck company employee.
- Elsie Fisher as Avery, Amanda's estranged child
- Lea DeLaria as Jocelyn, a homeless shelter resident
- Corbin Bernsen as Martin La Rosa, the lawyer for the tow truck company
- Bree Elrod as Lorraine
- Becky Ann Baker as Debbie
- Dierdre Friel as Alyssa
- Owen Campbell as SRT Lot

== Production ==
In February 2024, it was announced that Rose Byrne was cast in the film, which she would also produce. Later that same month, it was announced that Dominic Sessa was cast in the film. In March 2024, it was announced that Demi Lovato was cast in the film. In April 2024, it was announced that Ariana DeBose was added to the cast. It was also announced that same month that Octavia Spencer was cast in the film. Later that same month, it was announced that Simon Rex was also cast.

Filming occurred in Cranford and Bayonne, New Jersey in April 2024.

== Release ==
Tow had its world premiere at the 2025 Tribeca Festival on June 7 at the Spotlight Narrative section. In September 2025, the film's U.S. distribution rights were acquired by Roadside Attractions and Vertical for a 2026 release. The film was released in the United States on March 20, 2026.

== Reception ==
On the review aggregator website Rotten Tomatoes, 77% of 69 critics' reviews are positive, with an average rating of 6.4/10. The website's consensus reads: "A humble story of persistence given outsized punch by Rose Byrne's spiky performance, Tow parks itself comfortably in the company of genuinely life-affirming dramas." Metacritic, which uses a weighted average, assigned the film a score of 64 out of 100, based on 10 critics, indicating "generally favorable" reviews.

Christian Zilko of IndieWire graded the film a B−. Pete Hammond of Deadline Hollywood gave the film a positive review and wrote, "Ultimately, Laing and company deliver a story of perseverance, heart, and real fight, the kind of small human story we see less frequently these days, but need now more than ever. Tow is a winner". Lovia Gyarke of The Hollywood Reporter also gave the film a positive review and wrote, "Still, in its modest way, Tow sends a powerful message about how many of us have more in common with a person sleeping in a car than we do the billionaires we've been conditioned to admire".
