= To Live, to Die, to Live Again =

2024 film

- French: Vivre, mourir, renaître
- Directed by: Gaël Morel
- Written by: Gaël Morel; Laurette Polmanss
- Produced by: Laurent Pétin; Michèle Pétin
- Starring: Victor Belmondo; Lou Lampros; Théo Christine
- Cinematography: David Chambille
- Edited by: Catherine Schwartz
- Production companies: ARP Sélection; Arte France Cinéma
- Distributed by: ARP Sélection
- Release dates: 23 May 2024 (Cannes); 25 September 2024 (France)
- Running time: 109 minutes
- Country: France
- Language: French

To Live, to Die, to Live Again (French: Vivre, mourir, renaître) is a 2024 French drama film co-written and directed by Gaël Morel. The film stars Victor Belmondo, Lou Lampros and Théo Christine as Cyril, Emma and Sammy, three young adults in a love triangle whose lives are sent in unexpected directions by HIV/AIDS.

The film had its world premiere at the Cannes Premiere section of the 2024 Cannes Film Festival, on 23 May 2024. The film was theatrically released in France on 25 September 2024 by ARP Sélection.

== Cast ==
- Victor Belmondo as Cyril
- Lou Lampros as Emma
- Théo Christine as Sammy
- Noah Deric
- Amanda Lear as Leolia
- Elli Medeiros
- Stéphane Rideau

== Release ==
The film had its world premiere on 23 May 2024 at the Cannes Premiere section of the 2024 Cannes Film Festival, where it was nominated for the Queer Palm.

In November 2024, it was named as a finalist for the Louis Delluc Prize for Best Film, but did not win.
