= Oh. What. Fun. =

2025 American Christmas comedy film

- Release poster
- Directed by: Michael Showalter
- Screenplay by: Chandler Baker; Michael Showalter
- Based on: Oh. What. Fun. by Chandler Baker
- Produced by: Michael Showalter; Jordana Mollick; Kate Churchill; Berry Welsh; Jane Rosenthal
- Starring: Michelle Pfeiffer; Felicity Jones; Chloë Grace Moretz; Denis Leary; Dominic Sessa; Jason Schwartzman; Eva Longoria; Joan Chen
- Cinematography: Jim Frohna
- Edited by: Alisa Lepselter; Nick Moore
- Music by: Siddhartha Khosla
- Production companies: Semi Formal Productions; TriBeCa Productions
- Distributed by: Amazon MGM Studios (via Prime Video)
- Release date: December 3, 2025
- Running time: 108 minutes
- Country: United States
- Language: English

Oh. What. Fun. is a 2025 American Christmas comedy film directed by Michael Showalter, written by Chandler Baker and Showalter, and starring Michelle Pfeiffer, Felicity Jones, Chloë Grace Moretz, Denis Leary, Dominic Sessa, with Jason Schwartzman, Eva Longoria, and Joan Chen.

The plot tells the story of the family matriarch Claire going through the obstacles of planning the perfect Christmas with her husband, her three kids, and her grandkids while contending with her neighbor from across the street with comical results.

The film was first released on December 3, 2025, on Amazon Prime Video. The film received negative reviews from critics.

== Plot ==
Texas housewife Claire Clauster spends the entire year planning the perfect family Christmas for her husband Nick and their three children Channing, Taylor and Sammy. The children and their guests arrive two days before Christmas: Channing brings her husband Doug Austin and young twins Lucy and Ben, while Taylor brings DJ Sweatpants, the latest in a long line of girlfriends. Meanwhile, underemployed Sammy is morose over his partner Mae-bell dumping him.

The Clauster clan takes Claire's efforts for granted and ignore her hints that she wants to be nominated for the Best Holiday Mom contest, which would result in an all-expenses-paid trip to Burbank to meet her idol, talk show host Zazzy Tims. In an effort to one-up her neighbor Jeanne Wang-Wasserman's gift, Claire takes Channing shopping. Channing admits that she wants to form new Christmas traditions, which upsets her. Claire steals a large candle from a store, as she refuses to wait in the long line at the checkout and escapes a large group of mall cops.

While Claire briefly goes to the Wang-Wassermans', her family members forget to take her along on a Christmas-themed dance show she had gotten them tickets for. A fed-up Claire drives away. Hours later, she winds up at a motel and shares a room with female delivery driver Morgan. Claire's car is towed for being in the yellow zone, so she purchases a beater, a 1976 AMC Pacer, from the motel owner. She decides to drive to California to gatecrash Zazzy's Holiday Mom contest.

Meanwhile, the Clauster family falls into disarray. Over Christmas Eve dinner, the siblings argue about their life paths, and Doug reveals to DJ Sweatpants that Taylor brought a female friend over to the house earlier. Taylor explains that the woman was a heterosexual jeweler who had made a ring with which Taylor was going to propose.

However, DJ Sweatpants was already uncomfortable with Taylor's dating history as she had been shown an album including many different photos of her with girlfriends. Also, a proposal after they only dated for three months seems immature, so she leaves. Sammy goes to a local bar and encounters his longtime crush Lizzie, one of Jeanne's daughters.

On Christmas morning, the Clausters go next door to collect Sammy where they guiltily catch Claire on Zazzy Tims' show. Claire blurts out that she had to invite herself as her family did not appreciate her. An amused Zazzy later bonds with Claire over mothers feeling underappreciated and Claire goes viral.

The next morning, Zazzy arranges for the Clausters to reunite with Claire on her show. Off-camera, Claire and her children make up, especially after she and Channing finally communicate. Meanwhile, Sammy rejects a repentant Mae-bell, insisting they go their separate ways.

One year later, the Clausters and the Wang-Wassermans go on a ski trip together. Sammy and Lizzie are now dating. This year, Taylor is dating a woman named Serena. Claire relaxes in a hot tub as her family prepares dinner.

== Cast ==
- Michelle Pfeiffer as Claire, the matriarch of the Clauster family; also narrator
- Felicity Jones as Channing, Claire's oldest daughter
- Chloë Grace Moretz as Taylor, Claire's middle daughter
- Denis Leary as Nick, Claire's husband
- Dominic Sessa as Sammy, Claire's youngest son
- Danielle Brooks as Morgan, a delivery truck driver that Claire meets
- Jason Schwartzman as Doug, Channing's husband
- Eva Longoria as Zazzy Tims, the host of a popular talk show
- Joan Chen as Jeanne Wang-Wasserman, Claire's neighbor from across the street
- Devery Jacobs as Donna a.k.a. DJ Sweatpants, Taylor's girlfriend
- Havana Rose Liu as Lizzie Wang-Wasserman, Jeanne's second daughter
- Maude Apatow as Mae-bell, Sammy's ex-girlfriend
- Rose Abdoo as Jane
- Kurt Braunohler as Knut
- Saidah Ekulona (Note: Inexplicably re-credited to include her middle name, as Saidah Arrika Ekulona, in closing credits scroll) as Martha

In addition, the bird and the bee have a cameo as themselves, the musical guests on The Zazzy Tims Show.

== Production ==
The film is produced by Amazon MGM Studios and directed by Michael Showalter. The script is based on a short story, published by Amazon Original Stories, written by Chandler Baker. Showalter and Baker wrote the script for the film. Baker is an executive producer. Producers on the project include Showalter and Jordana Mollick for Semi-Formal Productions, Berry Welsh and Jane Rosenthal for Tribeca Productions and Kate Churchill. Michelle Pfeiffer was cast in the lead role in March 2024. Chloë Grace Moretz, Dominic Sessa, Felicity Jones and Denis Leary joined the cast in April 2024. In May, Jason Schwartzman, Eva Longoria, Joan Chen, Devery Jacobs, Havana Rose Liu, Danielle Brooks, and Maude Apatow joined the cast of the film. Principal photography began on May 1, 2024, in Atlanta, Georgia, and wrapped on July 1. The title is a reference to the lyrics of "Jingle Bells" by James Lord Pierpont: "Oh what fun it is to ride in a one-horse open sleigh". The last name Clauster is a reference to Claus, the last name of Santa Claus.

=== Music ===
The film's soundtrack was announced in November 2025 to release alongside the film via Sony Music Masterworks. It features songs from Gwen Stefani, the bird and the bee, St. Vincent, Sharon Van Etten, Fleet Foxes, Uwade, The Wang Family, Weyes Blood, Andy Shauf, Madi Diaz, Jeff Tweedy, Lorely Rodriguez, and Dominic Sessa. Stefani's "Shake the Snow Globe" was featured in the film's trailer and released on November 5, 2025. Van Etten's cover of The Pretenders' "2000 Miles" released on November 12, 2025. Fleet Foxes' cover of Elliott Smith's "Angel In The Snow" was released on November 21, 2025.

== Reception ==
On the review aggregator website Rotten Tomatoes, 36% of 56 critics' reviews are positive, with an average rating of 5.1/10. The website's consensus reads: "Stuffing a whole lot of talent into too puny a stocking, Oh. What. Fun.'s murky holiday spirit and distracting product placement too often weigh down an appealing cast." Metacritic, which uses a weighted average, assigned the film a score of 38 out of 100, based on 12 critics, indicating "generally unfavorable" reviews. Despite critical reviews, the film hit #1 worldwide on Amazon Prime Video.

Nell Minnow of RogerEbert.com gave the film 2 out of 4 stars, writing: "While "Oh. What. Fun" has an excellent director, Michael Showalter, who also co-scripted, some nice music, and top performers, including Danielle Brooks as a delivery driver Claire meets on the road, and the exquisitely lovely Havana Rose Liu, very appealing as Jeanne's daughter, it keeps undermining our sympathy with off-kilter stakes and inert efforts at humor." Variety gave the film a negative review, criticizing the film for presenting characters that are not "truly held accountable for their selfish actions in any significant way", and describing the comedy as "heavily orchestrated, awkward and quickly wear[ing] down one's patience."

== See also ==
- List of Christmas films
