= Ezequiel Rodríguez (actor) =

Argentine actor (born 1977)

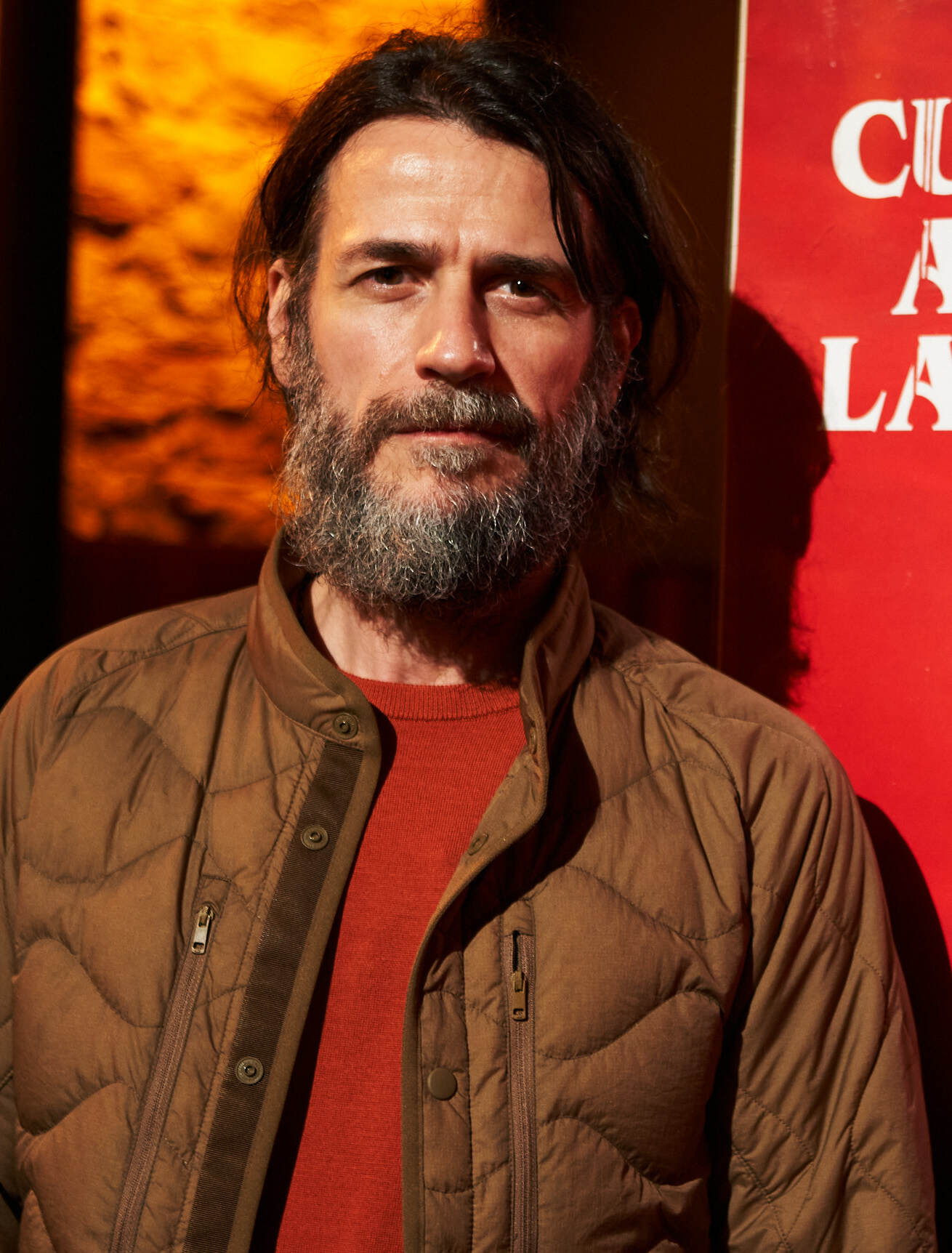
- Rodríguez in 2023
- Born: 11 April 1977 (age 49); Buenos Aires, Argentina
- Occupation: Actor
- Years active: 1988–present

Ezequiel Rodríguez (born 11 April 1977), is an Argentine actor.

== Filmography ==
Year	Title	Role
1999	Verano del 98	Damián Guzmán
2000	Luna salvaje	Alejandro "Alejo" Águilar
2001	PH	Lucas Grimaldi
2003	Costumbres argentinas	Marcos Liniers
2007	Mujeres de nadie	Octavio
2010	Casi Ángeles	Kant
2012–15	Violetta	Pablo Galindo
2013–14	Taxxi, amores cruzados	Benito Gómez
2016	Los ricos no piden permiso	Sebastian Yañes
2016–18	Soy Luna	Ricardo Simonetti
2017–	Las Estrellas	
2023	When Evil Lurks	Pedro Yazurlo
