= Hunter Doohan =

American actor (born 1994)

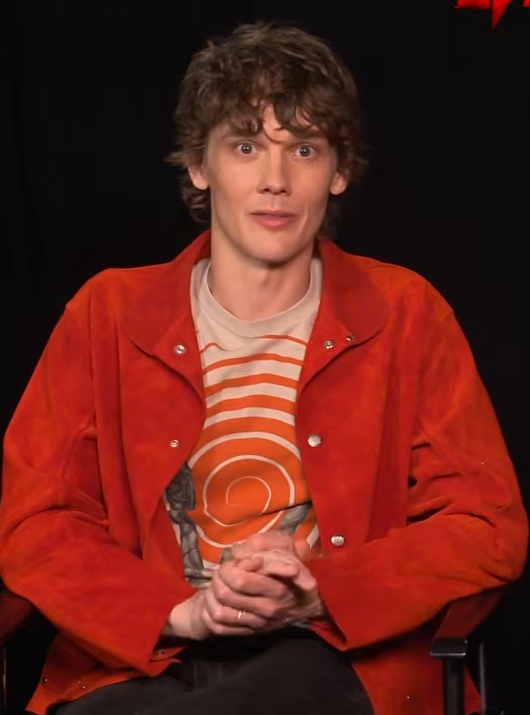
- Doohan in 2026
- Born: January 18, 1994 (age 32); Fort Smith, Arkansas, U.S.
- Occupations: Actor, film producer
- Years active: 2015–present
- Spouse: Fielder Jewett (m. 2022)
- Father: Peter Doohan

Hunter Doohan (born January 18, 1994) is an American actor and film producer. He gained recognition for his roles in the television series Wednesday (2022–present) and Daredevil: Born Again (2025).

== Early life ==
Doohan is the son of the Australian professional tennis player Peter Doohan (1961–2017) and Angie Harper Carmichael. He grew up "all over the south" but chiefly in Fort Smith, Arkansas. He became interested in acting via high school and community theatre programs; after high school he took up an internship at Elizabeth Barnes Casting in Los Angeles before working in a variety of day jobs including background extra, waiter, and Universal Studios tour guide while studying acting and auditioning for parts.

== Career ==
Doohan's breakthrough role was playing the younger version of Aaron Paul's character Warren Cave in the first season of the 2019 Apple TV+ series Truth Be Told. In 2020, he appeared with a main role in the legal drama series Your Honor. He portrayed Adam Desiato, the son of Bryan Cranston's character, that gets into trouble after being involved in a hit-and-run accident.

In 2022, he began portraying Tyler Galpin in the Netflix series Wednesday, an adaption of The Addams Family. He stars alongside Jenna Ortega, Emma Myers, Catherine Zeta-Jones, Christina Ricci, and Gwendoline Christie. The show received rave reviews and became the most viewed English language series on Netflix. Nielsen Media Research reported a combined watch time of 6 billion minutes within its first week of release, making it the second-biggest streaming week ever recorded by the firm. The show has run for two seasons and was renewed for a third, with Doohan set to return.

In 2025, Doohan appeared in the first season of Marvel's Daredevil: Born Again, as serial killer Bastian Cooper / Muse. Doohan also starred in the American drama film The Wilderness, which released in October 2025. In 2026, he starred in the supernatural horror film, Evil Dead Burn, the sixth installment in the Evil Dead series.

== Personal life ==
Doohan, who is gay, began dating producer Fielder Jewett in 2015 and the two married in June 2022. The wedding was officiated by Doohan's friend and co-star Bryan Cranston.

While Doohan has been open about his sexuality since he was 18, he admitted to privating pictures of him and his then-boyfriend when auditioning for roles. Doohan has credited fellow actor Jonathan Bailey, who is also gay, for inspiring him to be open about his sexuality in the industry.

== Filmography ==
Key
†	Denotes films that have not yet been released

=== Film ===
Film appearances
Year	Title	Role	Notes
2012	Lost Pursuit	Dreamer	Short film
2013	Grace	Tom	Short film
2014	Rhonda and Ruby	Damon	Short film
2015	It's Supposed to be Healthy	Josh	Short film
2016	Mosh Opera	Robbie	Short film
2017	Far from the Tree		Short film
2017	Step Into: Miss Laura's	Levi	Short film
2018	Dirty Bomb	Robert	Short film
2018	Soundwave	Ben Boyles	
2019	Where We Disappear	Ivan	
2021	Last Patrol on Okinawa	Pvt. Jimmy Fish Morris	Short film
2022	Ringing Rocks	Anson	Short film
2023	Free Bench Must Pick Up Today	George	Short film
2025	The Wilderness	Ed	Also producer
2026	Evil Dead Burn	Joseph Price	

=== Television ===
Television appearances
Year	Title	Role	Notes
2015	The Other Client List	Tyler	Episode: "Responsible Bianca"
2015	Coffee House Chronicles	Owen	Episode: "Jail Bait"
2018	Westworld	Confederado Scout	Episode: "Virtù e Fortuna"
2018	Cagney and Lacey	Sean Ward	Television film
2019	Schooled	Matt Ryan	Episode: "Be Like Mike"
2019–2020	Truth Be Told	Teenage Warren Cave	8 episodes
2019	What/If	Tyler	Episode: "What Ghosts"
2020–2021	Your Honor	Adam Desiato	10 episodes
2022–present	Wednesday	Tyler Galpin	Main role; 14 episodes
2025–2026	Daredevil: Born Again	Bastian Cooper / Muse	Recurring role; 7 episodes
