= Aritz Moreno =

Spanish film director

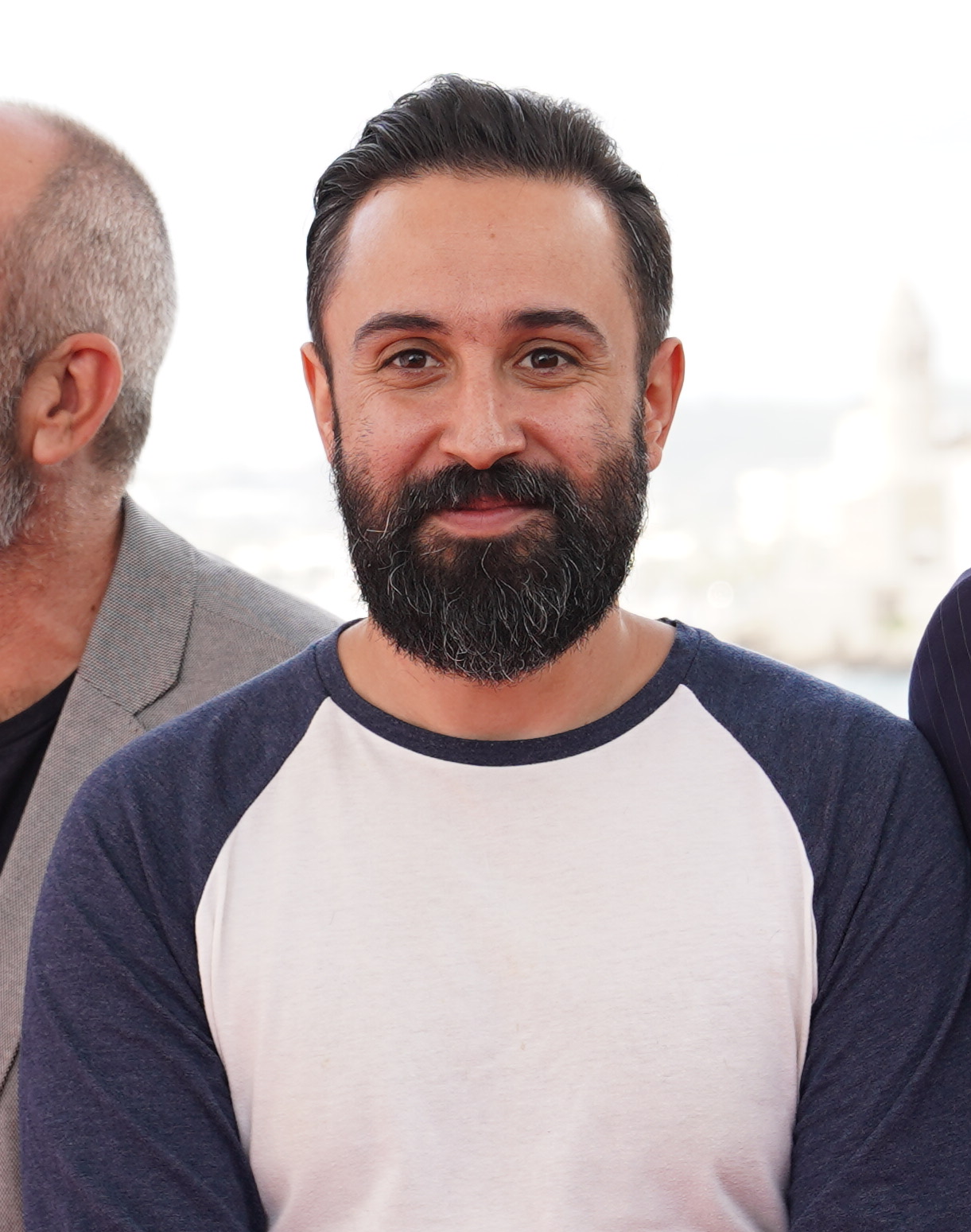
- Moreno in 2019
- Born: 1980 (age 45–46); San Sebastián, Basque Country, Spain
- Occupation: Filmmaker

Aritz Moreno (born 1980) is a Spanish filmmaker.

== Life and career ==
Moreno was born in San Sebastián in 1980. Early work includes the short film Cólera (2013). He made his feature film directorial debut with the black comedy Advantages of Travelling by Train, which premiered at the 2019 Sitges Film Festival. For his work on the film, he earned nominations for the Goya Award for Best New Director and the Feroz Award for Best Director. His sophomore feature was the thriller Flies (2023), also presented at Sitges. In 2025, he shot his third feature, Karateka, a biopic about Sandra Sánchez.

His television work also includes direction credits in The Invisible Girl and Zorras.
