= Sébastien Vaniček =

French filmmaker (born 1989)

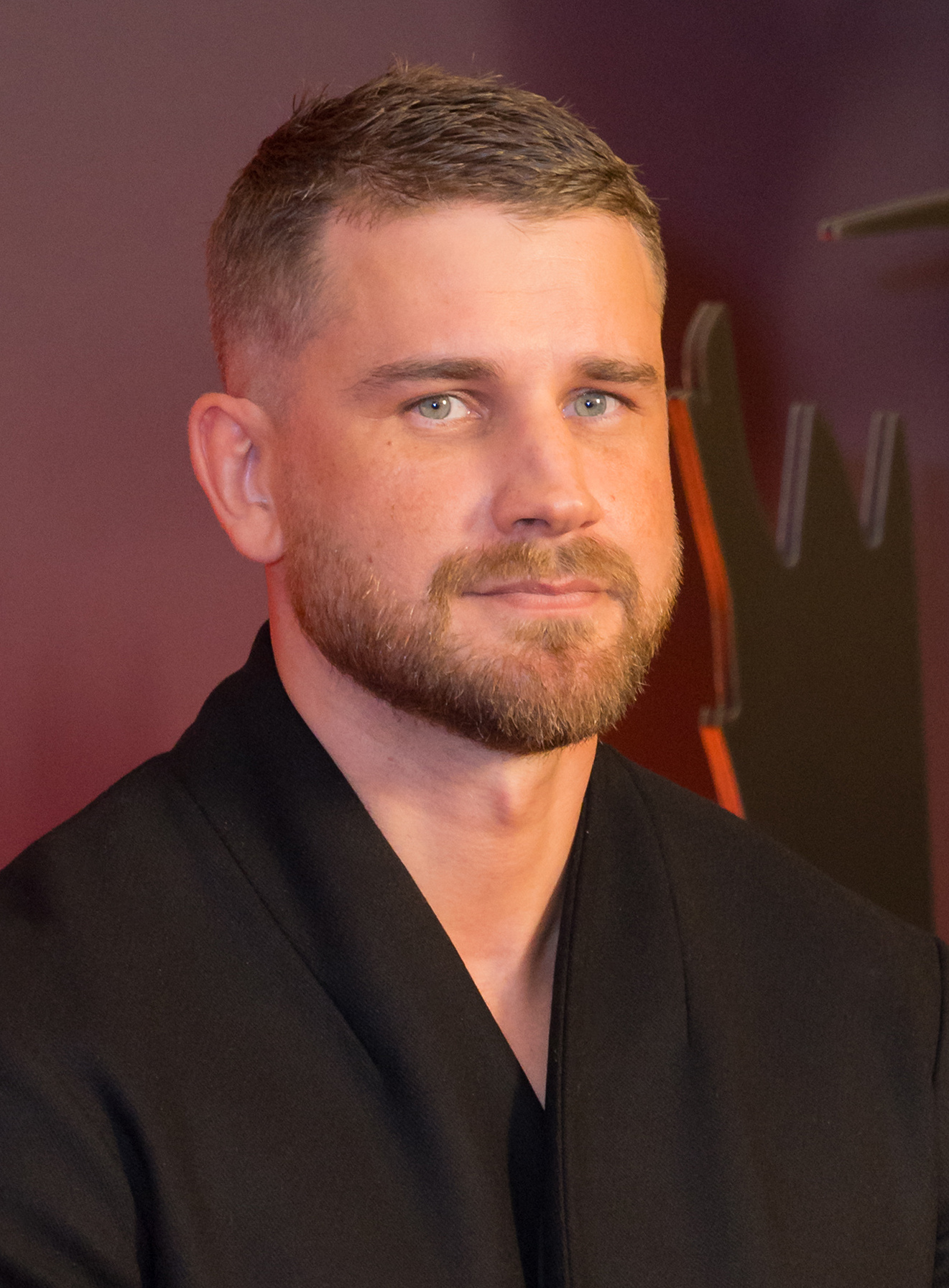
- Vaniček in 2026
- Born: 19 August 1989 (age 37); Nogent-sur-Marne, France
- Occupations: Film director; screenwriter
- Years active: 2015–present

Sébastien Vaniček (born 19 August 1989) is a French filmmaker best known for directing the horror films Infested (2023) and Evil Dead Burn (2026).

== Career ==
After directing the short films 299 792 458 m/s (2015), Mayday (2015), and Crocs (2018), he wrote and directed his first feature film with Vermin (2023). Vermin, retitled to Infested, had its world premiere at the 80th Venice International Film Festival. The film received critical acclaim, and it grossed over $2 million worldwide.

In 2025, he wrote and directed Evil Dead Burn (2026), the sixth film of the Evil Dead horror franchise. The film received mixed-to-positive reviews from critics, and it has grossed over $50 million worldwide.

In July 2026, Vaniček expressed interest in directing a new adaptation of The Mask that was darker and more violent, staying closer in tone to the original comics.

== Filmography ==
=== Feature film ===
Year	Title	Director	Writer	Notes / Ref(s)
2023	Infested	Yes	Yes	
2026	Evil Dead Burn	Yes	Yes	

=== Short film ===
Year	Title	Director	Writer	Notes / Ref(s)
2015	299 792 458 m/s	Yes	Yes	
2015	Mayday	Yes	Yes	
2018	Crocs	Yes	Yes	

== Awards and nominations ==
Year	Award	Category	Recipient	Result	Ref.
2023	19th Fantastic Fest	Best Director (Horror Features)	Infested	Won	
2023	19th Fantastic Fest	Best Picture (Horror Features)	Infested	Won	
2023	56th Sitges Film Festival	Special Jury Prize	Infested	Won	
2023	56th Sitges Film Festival	Best Motion Picture	Infested	Nominated	
2023	16th Strasbourg European Fantastic Film Festival	Best Feature Film (Audience Award)	Infested	Won	
2023	16th Strasbourg European Fantastic Film Festival	Best International Feature Film (Octopus d'Or)	Infested	Nominated	
2023	16th Strasbourg European Fantastic Film Festival	Best European Fantastic Feature Film (Melies D'Argent)	Infested	Nominated	
2024	49th César Awards	Best First Film	Infested	Nominated	
2024	26th Fangoria Chainsaw Awards	Best International Movie	Infested	Nominated	
