= Last Straw =

2023 American film

- Directed by: Alan Scott Neal
- Written by: Taylor Sardoni
- Produced by: Dane Eckerle; Daniel Brandt; Phil Keefe; Cole Eckerle
- Starring: Jessica Belkin; Taylor Kowalski; Jeremy Sisto
- Cinematography: Andrey Nikolaev
- Edited by: Nathan Whiteside
- Music by: Alan Palomo
- Distributed by: Shout! Studios
- Release dates: October 6, 2023 (Sitges); September 20, 2024 (United States)
- Running time: 83 minutes
- Country: United States
- Language: English

Last Straw is a 2023 American horror-thriller film directed by Alan Scott Neal, written by Taylor Sardoni, and produced by Dane Eckerle, Daniel Brandt, Phil Keefe and Cole Eckerle. Starring Jessica Belkin, Taylor Kowalski, and Jeremy Sisto, the film focuses on a young waitress who fights for her life over the course of one long night when a small town killing spree lands on the doorstep of a rural diner.

The film had its world premiere at the 56th Sitges Film Festival on October 6, 2023, before releasing in select theaters, digital and VOD on September 20, 2024 by Shout! Studios.

== Plot ==
Nancy Osborne works as a waitress at the diner owned by her widowed father, Edward Osborne. One day, he promotes her to manager and he states that he wants to begin dating again so he puts her in charge of the diner. The restaurant staff consists of the chef Jake Colins; the janitor Peter Colins, who has Down's Syndrome and is Jake's younger brother; waiter Bobby; and other unknown members. During her shift, she vomits at the sight of leftover food, causing the diner chef, Jake Colins to suspect that she is pregnant. His suspicions turn out to be true since the pregnancy causes Nancy's behavior to become volatile to her staff and only gets worse after a group of teenage troublemakers make a scene in the diner.

Without thinking, she impulsively fires Jake, despite his pledge that he needs the job for his basic needs and prescriptions. Her father scolds her for firing the only chef of the diner. Despite wanting to close early, she opts to work in the diner all night to pay the bills. Suddenly, the diner is attacked by a group of masked men and they start to terrorize her. Nancy calls the police and a cop shows up and reveals that the group of masked men are involved in a recent murder. The masked men ambush and kill the cop, forcing Nancy to hide in the diner. Bobby, one of the diner's employees, comes by and is captured along with Nancy when they break into the diner. As they torture both Nancy and Bobby, Nancy breaks free and stabs one of the attackers who turns out to be Peter.

It is revealed that Jake's cooking job at the diner is to fund his drug addiction. After getting fired, he comes upon the group of teenager troublemakers and blames them for making Nancy mad enough to fire him. In a drug-fueled rage, he kills two of them while the other two run off. He then enlists Bobby, his brother and fellow co-worker Coop to prank Nancy by scaring her, but things go awry when Nancy calls the police and Jake kills the officer to avoid being exposed as the killer of the teenagers. Bobby realizes the situation has gone out of control and plans to bail out. Edward calls Jake looking for Nancy and leaves him a message saying he always has a job at the diner. Unable to stop his brother's bleeding, Peter dies in Jake's arms. Nancy manages to break free from her restraint and then pushes Coop into the cooking oil and knocks him out.

She sees that Jake has killed Bobby for fear he will rat him out to the police. Nancy's friend, Tabitha comes to the restaurant after receiving Nancy's distress call but runs away in terror after seeing Bobby's corpse. Nancy surprises Jake and stabs him in the back, but he overpowers her and stabs her in the side and stomach, leaving her for dead before heading home. Due to slabs of meat she's taped around her stomach, Nancy survives, and she tearfully admits to Bobby that the unborn child in her belly was his due to a drunken night last month between her and him.

Nancy takes the police car, drives to Jake's house and stabs him in the neck, killing him. Exhausted and injured, she walks out to the road and collapses on the ground. A flashback scene shows a conversation between Nancy and Tabitha in a car, where Nancy questions the points of everything. Back in the present, Edward arrives, distraught at the sight of his injured daughter, assuring her that help is on the way, as Nancy exclaims, "My baby."

== Cast ==
- Jessica Belkin as Nancy Osborne
- Taylor Kowalski as Jake Collins
- Joji Otani-Hansen as Bobby
- Christopher M. Lopes as Petey
- Jeremy Sisto as Edward Osborne
- Glen Gould as Sheriff Brooks
- Michael Giannone as Coop
- Tara Raani as Tabitha

== Music ==
Alan Palomo of Neon Indian composed the original score for the film.

== Release ==
The film had its world premiere at the 56th Sitges Film Festival on October 6, 2023. The film went on to screen at Beyond Fest on October 8, 2023, the Austin Film Festival on October 28, 2023, the Paris International Fantastic Film Festival on December 11, 2023, and the Brussels International Fantastic Film Festival on April 10, 2024.

Shout! Studios acquired North American rights and released the film in select theaters, digital and VOD on September 20, 2024.

== Reception ==
On the review aggregator website Rotten Tomatoes, 80% of 35 critics' reviews are positive, with an average rating of 6.7/10.
