= Infested =

2023 film by Sébastien Vaniček

- Theatrical release poster
- French: Vermines
- Literally: Vermin
- Directed by: Sébastien Vaniček
- Screenplay by: Sébastien Vaniček; Florent Bernard
- Story by: Sébastien Vaniček
- Produced by: Harry Tordjman
- Starring: Théo Christine; Sofia Lesaffre; Jérôme Niel; Lisa Nyarko; Finnegan Oldfield
- Cinematography: Alexandre Jamin
- Edited by: Nassim Gordji-Tehrani; Thomas Fernandez
- Music by: Douglas Cavanna; Xavier Caux
- Production companies: My Box Films; Tandem
- Distributed by: Tandem
- Release dates: 30 August 2023 (Venice); 27 December 2023 (France)
- Running time: 106 minutes
- Country: France
- Language: French
- Box office: $2.4 million

Infested (French: Vermines, lit. 'Vermin') is a 2023 French horror film conceived, co-written, and directed by Sébastien Vaniček in his feature directorial debut. The film stars Théo Christine as a twenty-something banlieue resident who takes home a lethal desert spider that reproduces rapidly and causes a massive infestation in the neighborhood. Sofia Lesaffre, Jérôme Niel, Lisa Nyarko, and Finnegan Oldfield are featured in supporting roles.

Vaniček conceived the film as a social commentary on xenophobia, finding parallels between spiders and banlieue residents. American streaming service Shudder acquired the film for the United States and Canada and other key international territories ahead of its premiere at the 80th Venice International Film Festival and screening at Fantastic Fest 2023. The film was released in France on 27 December 2023, and on Shudder on 27 April 2024. Critical reception to the film was "overwhelmingly positive".

== Plot ==
Three Arab smugglers hunt for spiders in a Middle Eastern desert, during which one of them gets bitten and writhes in pain after dousing a nest with poison gas. More spiders emerge from the nest and the others net some with plastic containers. The bitten man is killed by his companion with a machete. The survivors escape in their truck.

One spider is transported to a convenience store in Paris, where sneakers dealer and exotic animal lover Kaleb buys it along with a pair of earrings. Back home in a multicultural suburb, Kaleb seizes a troublemaker's bag containing fireworks used to pull a prank, is reminded by his bicycle-thieving friend Mathys that he must sell Toumani his sneakers soon, and argues with his sister Manon over whether to sell their deceased mother's house. Kaleb keeps the spider in his room, only to lose it later after gifting his neighbor Claudia the earrings at her farewell party. Unable to find it, he takes Toumani's sneakers and sleeps in the living room.

The next day, Kaleb argues with his former friend Jordy as he helps Lila (Jordy's girlfriend), Manon, and Mathys with renovating the house. Kaleb sells Toumani the sneakers, after which xenophobic resident Gilles approaches and suspects them of dealing drugs. Toumani gets bitten by spiders crawling out of a sneaker. After hanging up on Toumani several times, Kaleb finds him dead in his apartment. Toumani's body is wheeled away by authorities, who put the building on lockdown, causing panic among residents.

Gilles is adamant that Toumani died of drug overdose as a result of his earlier transaction with Kaleb, who forcefully denies selling him drugs. Jordy kills a spider bothering Lila in the bathroom, but spiderlings emerge from it and he barricades the room. Kaleb admits causing the infestation, revealing Jordy the shoebox containing the cocoon his spider made when it escaped. Jordy and Mathys seal it, horrified that spiders have reproduced inside. Kaleb agrees to leave with the group, on the condition that Claudia joins them.

Finding Claudia dead, Kaleb and Mathys run back to Jordy, Manon, and Lila, who learn that the spiders belong to the Sicariidae family. The infestation worsens: the spiders have grown exponentially and are reproducing rapidly, killing more residents. Discovering their escape plan, Gilles attacks them with a baton, and stabs open the sealed shoebox he thinks contains narcotics and is attacked by the spiders inside. En route to the parking garage, they carefully tread an infested hallway using the time-sensitive hall light to periodically stop the spiders upen learning of the spiders' sensitivity to light, but fall back in darkness when police gas and shoot at them, during which Jordy gets caught in a web and urges them to leave him behind before being killed by significantly larger spiders. Mathys uses fireworks to aid their escape to the roof. They reach Gilles' room, where Kaleb regrets cutting off his childhood friendship with Jordy; he learns from Lila that even though Jordy ratted him out to the police when Kaleb's pet iguana bit his leg, he would always dismiss it as an accident so that nobody would think badly of him.

The group resists being apprehended by authorities, but is overwhelmed and taken to the parking garage. The lieutenant defends the lockdown, which Kaleb dismisses as a failure, as it did more harm than good. Mathys, after revealing he had been bitten, sacrifices himself by charging through the door leading to the infested hallway, igniting a battle between spiders and armed men. Lila unties Kaleb, who then tells her to stay in her car while he finds Manon. He is reunited, albeit shot in the leg, with Manon. They break into a van, where she puts pressure on his wound; they patch up their differences. As spiders close in on them, Lila's headlights suddenly shine at them, allowing the siblings to escape with her. They are spared by a large spider blocking their path, and Kaleb opens the garage door.

Later, Manon and Lila tearfully watch the suburb collapse, while Kaleb buries a shoebox containing a childhood photo of him and Jordy in the woods. Kaleb takes a spider crawling on his shoulder in the palm of his hand and blows it away.

== Cast ==
- Théo Christine as Kaleb
- Sofia Lesaffre as Lila
- Jérôme Niel as Mathys
- Lisa Nyarko as Manon
- Finnegan Oldfield as Jordy
- Marie-Philomène Nga as Claudia
- Ike Zacsongo-Joseph as Toumani
- Emmanuel Bonami as Gilles
- Xing Xing Cheng as Mrs. Zhao
- Malik Amraoui as The Lieutenant

== Production ==
On 15 February 2023, Variety reported that principal photography on a French horror film entitled Vermin was underway in Paris, due to be completed on 3 March 2023. The magazine noted that French short film director Sébastien Vaniček would mark his feature directorial debut with Vermin (which he co-wrote with Florent Bernard and would feature real spiders), and that "local up-and-coming actors" Théo Christine, Finnegan Oldfield, Jérôme Niel, Sofia Lesaffre, and Lisa Nyarko had been cast. Vaniček told Screen Rant that he had already cast Christine when he and Bernard were writing the script. Vaniček eschewed references to other horror films in favor of originality, although he cited 2015's Green Room as a major influence on his film as well as acknowledged "obvious" similarities to 1979's Alien (of which he is a fan). In order to pitch the film, he had to bring not only the script but also a large book of concept art for the project.

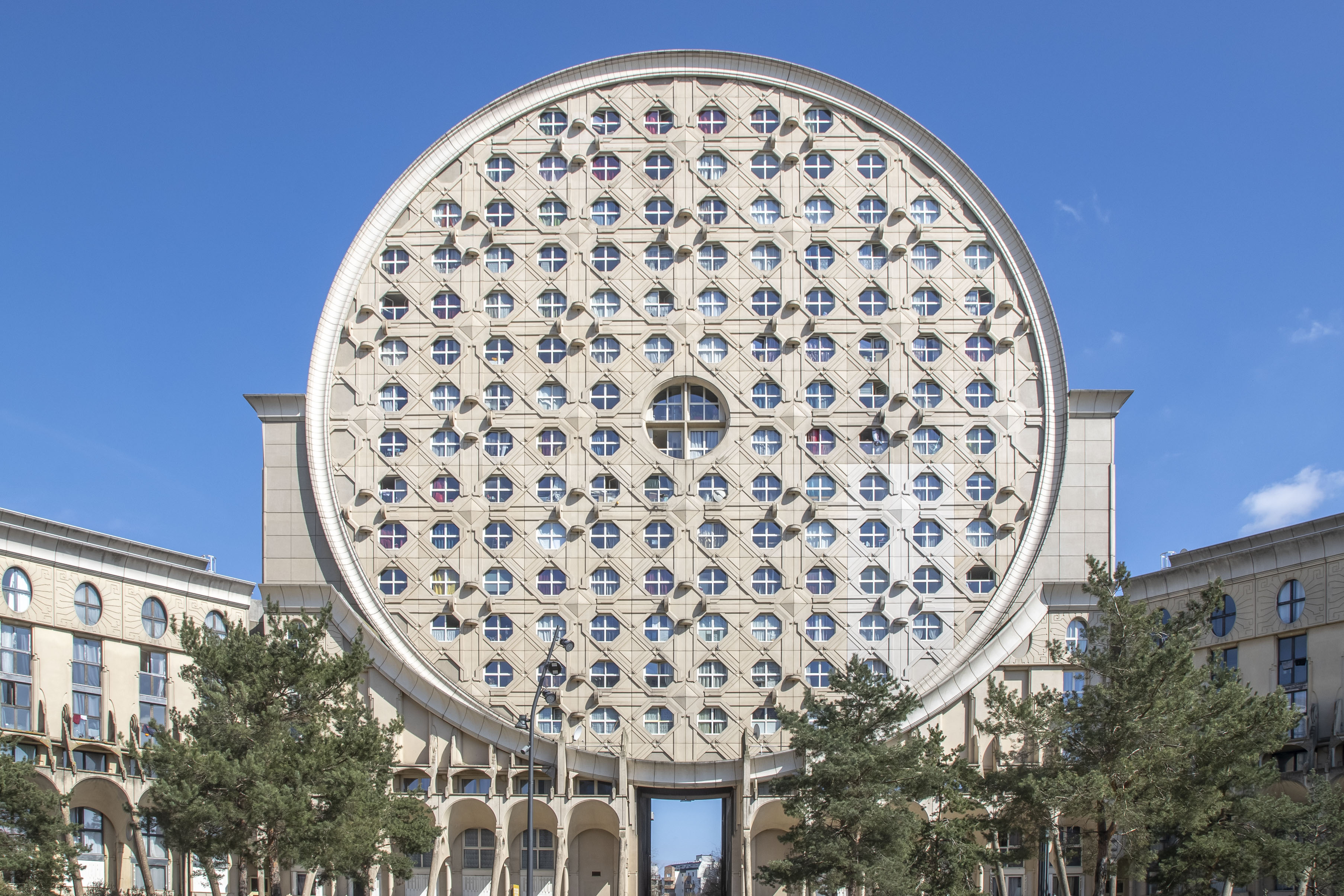
The Arènes de Picasso in Noisy-le-Grand (pictured in 2023), where exterior scenes were shot

The French daily Le Parisien noted that exterior scenes were shot on location at the Arènes de Picasso in Noisy-le-Grand. Vaniček considered the film "very personal", in that it "depicts the French suburbs [he knows]", drawing on his own experience living in such tight-knit communities while also coming to terms with how they are perceived in French urban areas. According to Vaniček, he could not understand why would suburbans be discriminated merely on the basis of being a part of these communities, which were seen as crime-ridden and unpleasant in general. He saw this issue as an opportunity to make a creature film exploring people's irrational fears through spiders, the fear of which he attributes to the way they move and look, finding this idea ripe for social commentary on xenophobia. He explained at Screen Rant:

You have this interesting parallel with spiders, because spiders are judged for their appearances, and then people from the suburbs are judged for where they come from. So, I immediately had this parallel, and I knew that I would treat my characters like the spiders, they are in the same building, and they will have to survive. And surviving means that you have a battle between these two, because people try to kill them, and they have to defend themselves from their predator.

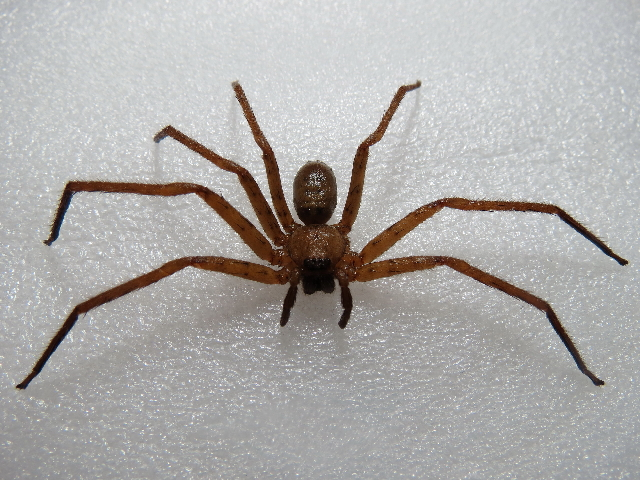
An adult female giant huntsman

Vaniček had the benefit of combining real spiders with CG spiders because the film was shot in chronological order. Two hundred giant huntsman spiders were used, which were then digitally enlarged. The natural behavior of the spiders presented unique benefits and challenges for filming. When placed in the open, the spiders would run to find hiding spots, but tire after a short time. Vaniček would film them running in these short bursts, then after they tired out, could place them where he wanted and film more static shots while they rested. Because the script called for scenes in which the cast was to communicate with spiders, actresses Lisa Nyarko and Sofia Lesaffre had to conquer their fear of spiders at the beginning of the shoot. Similarly, Vaniček said he took close-up shots of the spiders with the intention of showing how not frightening but "complex and beautiful" they are, whose aggression in the film stems purely from survival instinct as a result of being taken away from their habitat and being attacked by humans.

== Theme ==
Thematically, the film highlights social situations in the French suburbs such as class and racial discrimination and police brutality with its depiction of harsh treatment of its characters by both the authorities and the government. Film critics also likened the police lockdown to those during the COVID-19 pandemic, suggesting themes of quarantine and isolation.

== Release ==
The French magazine Première noted that the film would be theatrically released in its native France on 27 December 2023. It also reported that the film was attended by 200,000 audiences during its theatrical run and nominated for two César Awards, making it a commercially successful feature directorial debut for Sébastien Vaniček. According to Box Office Mojo, global box office sales for the film have totaled $2.4 million, with $1.9 million of sales coming from its native France.

American streaming service Shudder acquired the film for the United States and Canada as well as the United Kingdom, Australia, New Zealand, and Ireland ahead of its premiere at the 80th Venice International Film Festival; it began streaming on Shudder under the title Infested, on 26 April 2024. At the Venice Film Festival, it was the International Critics' Week section's closing feature. It was screened in competition at Fantastic Fest 2023, winning Best Picture and Best Director, and was later nominated for Best Motion Picture and awarded a Special Jury Prize at the 56th Sitges Film Festival. It was screened at the 2024 Overlook Film Festival.

== Reception ==
According to Screen Rant, the film garnered "overwhelmingly positive reviews for delivering compelling thrills and developing human characters" but polarized audiences over the visuals, which they compared unfavorably with those of 1990's Arachnophobia and 2007's The Mist. On the review aggregator website Rotten Tomatoes, 95% of 66 critics' reviews are positive, with an average rating of 7.6/10. The website's consensus reads: "A chillingly effective creature feature with more on its mind than simple creepy-crawlies, Infested draws viewers into its web with stylish efficiency." Metacritic, which uses a weighted average, assigned the film a score of 70 out of 100, based on 10 critics, indicating "generally favorable" reviews.

Variety critic Dennis Harvey found the film entertaining and scary, albeit "conceptually unremarkable". He praised the performances, particularly that of Théo Christine, attributing these to the director Sébastien Vaniček's acerbic dialogue and human drama. Likewise, Harvey said the filmmakers managed to combine several genres with "taut balance" and deliver a "first-rate" production on a seemingly tight budget. Ultimately, he said the film should be a must-watch to horror fans notwithstanding its quite "anticlimactic" finale. At Slant Magazine, Mark Hanson said the film should satisfy genre fans owing to the precision of the creature effects, but was himself displeased by its conventional narrative as well as sense of urgency to draw tension among audiences at the expense of character development. He said the film's social commentary was offset by its stock characters, making it less impactful than intended.

Stephen King, the author of The Mist's source novella, published a capsule review on Twitter calling Infested "scary, gross, well made". Collider ranked Infested 11th in its list of the scariest horror films of 2024, with the writer Daniel Boyer calling it "a chilling breath of fresh air" in its subgenre.

== Accolades ==
In the "Horror Features" section at the 2023 Fantastic Fest, the film won the award for "Best Director" and "Best Picture". The film was nominated for Best First Feature Film and Best Visual Effects at the 49th César Awards. The film was also nominated for "Best Motion Picture" and received the "Special Jury Prize" in the "Official Fantàstic Selection" at the 56th Sitges Film Festival. It was also nominated at the 2024 Fangoria Chainsaw Awards for "Best International Movie".
