= Somebody Is Watching You =

Alguien te está mirando
- Poster
- Directed by: Gustavo Cova, Horacio Maldonado
- Written by: Gustavo Cova, Horacio Maldonado
- Produced by: Gustavo Cova, Horacio Maldonado
- Starring: Horacio Erman
- Cinematography: Miguel Abal
- Edited by: Óscar Gómez
- Music by: Daniel Sais
- Release date: 3 November 1988
- Running time: 84 minutes
- Country: Argentina
- Language: Spanish

Somebody is Watching You (Spanish: Alguien te está mirando), also known as Somebody is Hanging Around, is a 1988 Argentine horror film directed and written by Gustavo Cova and Horacio Maldonado and starring Horacio Erman. Its soundtrack features songs by the Argentine rock band Soda Stereo.

== Synopsis ==
A group of students participates in a scientific experiment conducted by American researchers. The experiment aims to examine the impacts of a newly developed drug that enables the collective sharing of dreams among multiple individuals.

== Cast ==
- Horacio Erman
- Marisa Ferrari
- Andrea Fusero
- Lucy Green
- Hugo Halbrich
- Jorge Abel Martín
- James Murray
- Daniela Pal
- Michel Peyronel
- Ana María Pittaluga
- Osvaldo Santoro

== Release and acclaim ==
The film premiered on 3 November 1988.
