= Eve Best =

British actress (born 1971)

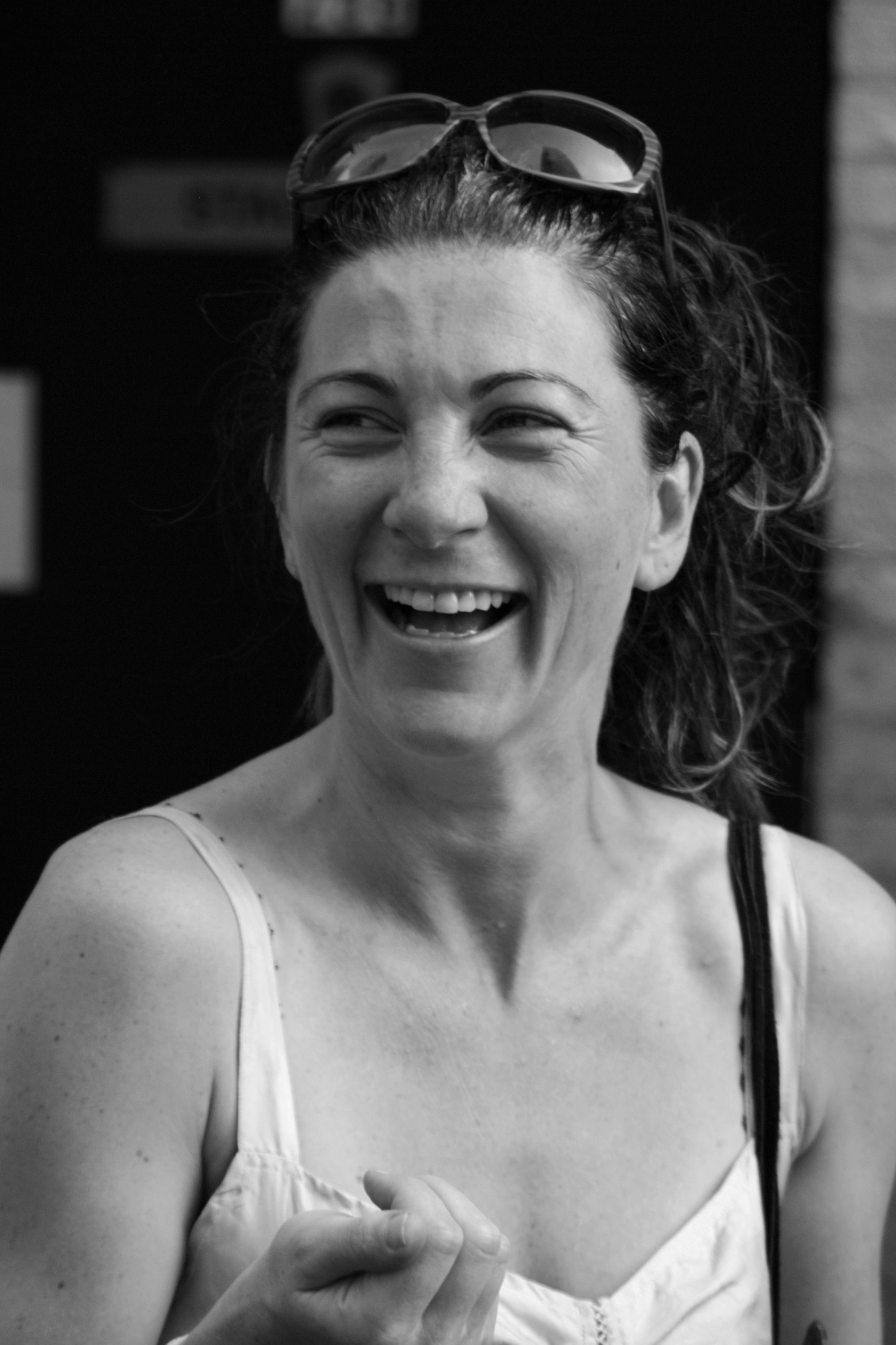
- Eve Best in 2007
- Born: Emily Frances Finlay Best; 31 July 1971 (age 55); London, England, UK
- Education: Lincoln College, Oxford (BA); Royal Academy of Dramatic Art (GrDip)
- Occupations: Actress, director
- Years active: 1995–present

Emily "Eve" Frances Finlay Best (born 31 July 1971) is an English actress and director. She is known for her television roles as Dr Eleanor O'Hara in the Showtime series Nurse Jackie (2009–2015), First Lady Dolley Madison in the American Experience television special (2011), Monica Chatwin in the BBC miniseries The Honourable Woman (2014) and Princess Rhaenys Targaryen in HBO's House of the Dragon (2022–2024). She also played Wallis Simpson in the 2010 film The King's Speech.

Best won the 2006 Olivier Award for Best Actress for playing the title role in Hedda Gabler. She made her Broadway debut in the 2007 revival of A Moon for the Misbegotten, winning the Drama Desk Award for Outstanding Actress in a Play, and receiving the first of two nominations for the Tony Award for Best Actress in a Play; the second was for the revival of The Homecoming in 2008. She returned to Broadway in the 2015 revival of Old Times.

== Early life ==
Best was born in Hammersmith, London, and grew up in Ladbroke Grove, London. She is the daughter of Alastair Finlay Best, a design journalist, and Susanna Joan Best (née Pulford), a theatre director; her mother founded a theatre company called Shakespeare Link, which aimed to spread Shakespeare’s word. Her parents married in Chelsea, London, in 1968. She also has a younger sister, Joscelyn Elizabeth, born in 1973. Her early performances were with the W11 Opera children's opera company in London at the age of nine. She attended Wycombe Abbey Girls' School before going on to Lincoln College, Oxford, where she studied English. After graduating from Oxford where she had appeared in Oxford University Dramatic Society productions and performed at the Edinburgh Festival, she made her professional debut as Beatrice in Much Ado About Nothing at the Southwark Playhouse.

== Career ==
After working on the London fringe, Best trained at the Royal Academy of Dramatic Art (RADA) in London. After graduating in 1999 she appeared in a revival of 'Tis Pity She's a Whore at the Young Vic for which she won both the Evening Standard and Critics' Circle best newcomer awards; she adopted her grandmother's name as a stage name, as an Emily Best was already registered with British Actors' Equity Association.

Best won a Laurence Olivier Award for playing the title role in Hedda Gabler and was nominated for the same award the following year for her performance as Josie in Eugene O'Neill's play A Moon for the Misbegotten at the Old Vic Theatre in London.

In early 2007, she starred in a Sheffield Crucible production of As You Like It which played for a short time at the RSC's Swan Theatre in Stratford as part of their Complete Works season. In the same year she performed in the Broadway transfer of A Moon for the Misbegotten for which she was nominated for a Tony Award as Best Actress in a Play.

Best appeared in Harold Pinter's The Homecoming at the Cort Theatre in New York, which co-starred Ian McShane, Raúl Esparza and Michael McKean. Daniel Sullivan directed the 20-week limited engagement, which ran until 13 April 2008. She once again appeared as Beatrice in a critically acclaimed production of Much Ado About Nothing at Shakespeare's Globe Theatre in 2011, playing opposite Charles Edwards as Benedick and starred in the Old Vic production of The Duchess of Malfi in 2012. She made her directorial debut with a production of Macbeth at Shakespeare's Globe Theatre in 2013.

Television appearances include Prime Suspect: The Final Act (2006), Waking the Dead (2004), Shackleton (2002), and The Inspector Lynley Mysteries (2005).

She appeared as Lucrece in the Naxos audiobook version of Shakespeare's The Rape of Lucrece. She also starred in a 2000 BBC Radio 4 production of Emma.

Best co-starred as Dr Eleanor O'Hara in the Showtime dark comedy series Nurse Jackie, that premiered in June 2009. She played the Duchess of Windsor – Wallis Simpson – in The King's Speech, starring Colin Firth and Geoffrey Rush.

Best also co-starred as Sally Ride, the first American woman in space, alongside William Hurt in The Challenger Disaster, a British made for TV dramatization of the Rogers Commission set up to investigate the 1986 Space Shuttle Challenger disaster.

In summer 2014 Best played Cleopatra, the leading role in the Shakespeare's Globe version of Antony and Cleopatra. She returned to Broadway in the 2015 revival of the Pinter play Old Times, opposite Clive Owen and Kelly Reilly. She played headmistress Farah Dowling in Fate: The Winx Saga.

The TV series Maryland aired in May 2023 on ITV1, with Best playing Rosaline, who is reuniting with her sister Becca (Suranne Jones) after their mother's body is found dead on the Isle of Man.

Wild Cherry by Nicôle Leckey presents Best as Juliet Londsdale, Lord's daughter, mother to a teenage daughter and author of a parenting guide, alongside Carmen Ejogo as Lorna Gibbons, mother of her daughter's best friend. Their privileged lives fall apart when their daughters are embroiled in a scandal at a private school in the Home Counties.

== Filmography ==
=== Film ===
| Year | Title | Role | Notes |
|---|---|---|---|
| 2001 | Brilliant! | Nina | (short) |
| 2002 | Shackleton | Eleanor Shackleton | TV movie |
| 2004 | The Lodge | Yuni | (short) |
| 2010 | The King's Speech | Wallis Simpson | |
| 2014 | Someone You Love | Kate | |
| 2014 | Unity | Narrator | Documentary |
| 2023 | Such A Lovely Day | Auntie Annie | (short) |

=== Television ===
| Year | Title | Role | Notes |
|---|---|---|---|
| 2000 | The Bill | Anne | Episode: Beasts |
| 2000 | Casualty | Amber Hope | Episode: Seize the Night |
| 2001 | The Infinite Worlds of H. G. Wells | Ellen McGillvray | TV mini-series |
| 2004 | Waking the Dead | Natasha Bloom | Episode: Shadowplay: Part 1 |
| 2004 | Lie With Me | Roselyn Tyler | TV mini-series |
| 2005 | The Inspector Lynley Mysteries | Amanda Gibson | Episode: In Divine Proportion |
| 2006 | Prime Suspect: The Final Act | Linda Philips | |
| 2006 | Vital Signs | Sarah Cartwright | 6 episodes |
| 2009–2013, 2015 | Nurse Jackie | Dr Eleanor O'Hara | Main cast (seasons 1–5); Guest (season 7) |
| 2010 | American Experience | Dolley Madison | Episode: Dolley Madison |
| 2010 | The Shadow Line | Petra Mayler | 3 episodes |
| 2012 | Up All Night | Yvonne Encanto | Episode: New Boss |
| 2013 | The Challenger Disaster | Sally Ride | |
| 2014 | New Worlds | Angelica Fanshawe | Episodes 1–3 |
| 2014 | The Honourable Woman | Monica Chatwin | Episodes 1–8 |
| 2015 | Life in Squares | Vanessa Bell | |
| 2016–2017 | Stan Lee's Lucky Man | Anna Clayton | Main cast |
| 2021–2022 | Fate: The Winx Saga | Farah Dowling | Main cast (season 1, 6 episodes; season 2, 1 episode) |
| 2022–2024 | House of the Dragon | Rhaenys Targaryen | Main cast (11 episodes) |
| 2023 | Maryland | Rosaline | Main cast (3 episodes) |
| 2023 | The Crown | Carole Middleton | 2 episodes |
| 2025 | Wild Cherry | Juliet Lonsdale | Main cast |

=== Stage ===
| Year | Title | Role | Location |
|---|---|---|---|
| 1995 | Much Ado About Nothing | Beatrice | Southwark Playhouse, London |
| 1996 | Sisters, Brothers | | Gate Theatre, London |
| 1999 | 'Tis Pity She's a Whore | Annabella | Young Vic, London |
| 2000 | The Heiress | Catherine | Royal National Theatre, London |
| 2000 | The Cherry Orchard | Varya | Royal National Theatre, London |
| 2001 | Macbeth | Lady Macbeth | Shakespeare's Globe, London |
| 2002 | The Misanthrope | Jennifer | Chichester Festival Theatre |
| 2002 | The Coast of Utopia | Liubov Bakunin | Royal National Theatre, London |
| 2003 | Three Sisters | Masha | Royal National Theatre, London |
| 2003 | Mourning Becomes Electra | Lavinia Mannon | Royal National Theatre, London |
| 2005 | Hedda Gabler | Hedda | Almeida, London and Duke of York's Theatre, London |
| 2006–07 | A Moon for the Misbegotten | Josie | Old Vic, London and Brooks Atkinson Theatre, New York |
| 2007 | As You Like It | Rosalind | Sheffield Crucible and Swan Theatre (Stratford) |
| 2007–08 | The Homecoming | Ruth | Cort Theatre, New York |
| 2011 | Much Ado About Nothing | Beatrice | Shakespeare's Globe, London |
| 2012 | The Duchess of Malfi | The Duchess | Old Vic, London |
| 2013 | Macbeth | Director | Shakespeare's Globe, London |
| 2014 | Antony and Cleopatra | Cleopatra | Shakespeare's Globe, London |
| 2015 | Old Times | Anna | American Airlines Theatre, Broadway |
| 2017 | Love in Idleness | Olivia Brown | Menier Chocolate Factory, Apollo Theatre, London |
| 2017 | A Woman of No Importance | Mrs Arbuthnot | Vaudeville, London |

== Awards and nominations ==
| Year | Award | Category | Work | Result | Ref. |
|---|---|---|---|---|---|
| 1999 | Evening Standard Award | The Milton Shulman Award for Outstanding Newcomer | 'Tis Pity She's a Whore | Won | |
| 1999 | Critics' Circle Theatre Award | The Jack Tinker Award for Most Promising Newcomer (other than a playwright) | 'Tis Pity She's a Whore | Won | |
| 2003 | Critics' Circle Theatre Award | Best Actress | Mourning Becomes Electra | Won | |
| 2005 | Critics' Circle Theatre Award | Best Actress | Hedda Gabler | Won | |
| 2006 | Laurence Olivier Award | Best Actress | Hedda Gabler | Won | |
| 2007 | Drama Desk Award | Outstanding Actress in a Play | A Moon for the Misbegotten | Won | |
| 2007 | Outer Critics Circle Award | Outstanding Actress in a Play | A Moon for the Misbegotten | Won | |
| 2007 | Laurence Olivier Award | Best Actress | A Moon for the Misbegotten | Nominated | |
| 2007 | Tony Award | Best Actress | A Moon for the Misbegotten | Nominated | |
| 2008 | Tony Award | Best Actress | The Homecoming | Nominated | |
| 2008 | Outer Critics Circle Award | Outstanding Actress in a Play | The Homecoming | Nominated | |
