= May Elghety =

Egyptian actress (born 1998)

- مي الغيطي
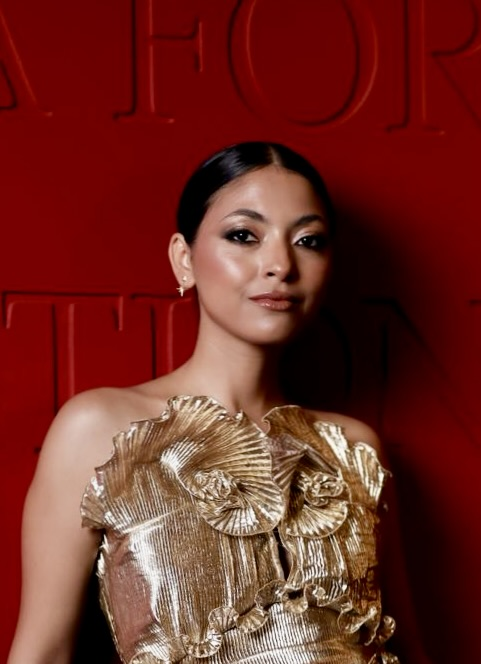
- May Elghety at Gouna Film Festival 2025
- Born: May Mohamed Elghety; 8 December 1998 (age 27); Cairo, Egypt
- Other names: Mai El Gheity, May El Gheity, May El Ghety
- Education: American University in Cairo, Queen Mary University of London
- Occupations: Actress, singer
- Spouse: Andreas Brown (m. 2025)

May Mohamed Elghety (Arabic: مي الغيطي, romanized: May El Gheity; born 8 December 1998), is an Egyptian actress. She is known for her roles in film and television.

== Early life and education ==
May Elghety was born on 8 December 1998, in Cairo, Egypt. She is the daughter of television presenter and writer Mona Barouma, and screenwriter Mohamed El Gheity. Her older sister is Mayar El Gheity, who is also an actress.

She began in the field of acting at the age of five through small roles in several television productions, including Al Shabaka Al Mashoura, Awasef Al Nesaa, Bent Men El Zaman Da, and Captain Hima. Her portrayal of Bayada in the television series The Minors (El-Kaserat) in 2013 marked a major turning point in her career. She was awarded the best upcoming actress award at the Arab Drama Festival in 2013 for her work in The Minors.

Elghety studied psychology at the American University in Cairo, graduating in 2020 with honors. She later earned a master’s degree in mental health and psychotherapy from Barts and The London School of Medicine and Dentistry at Queen Mary University of London in 2022.

== Career ==
Elghety appeared in the political drama film Clash (2016), which opened the Un Certain Regard section at the Cannes Film Festival that same year. In the same year, she won best actress at the My Love Michelle Short Film Festival in Austin, Texas for her role in the short film Nada (2017), in which she portrayed a hearing impaired and mute dancer who falls in love with a visually impaired pianist.

In 2022, she released the EP single, Pink.

In the field of international voice acting, she joined Disney’s South African animated anthology series Kizazi Moto: Generation Fire (2023), voicing the character Nawara, making her the only Egyptian and North African actress to participate in the series. Additionally, she provided the voice of Nora Massoud in the video game Battlefield 6, released in 2025.

In addition, Elghety is part of the cast of the horror film Lee Cronin's The Mummy (2026), directed by Lee Cronin, distributed globally by Warner Bros. Pictures.

== Environmental advocacy work ==
Elghety has been active in environmental advocacy since 2018, supporting sustainability and environmental conservation initiatives. She has participated in campaigns to clean the Nile River that resulted in the removal of tons of waste.

In 2025, Elghety was announced as a European Union Goodwill Ambassador for Water, in recognition of her work in the environmental field. In the same year, she was selected as a jury member for the Green Star Award at the El Gouna Film Festival, a prize awarded to films that raise awareness of environmental issues and promote sustainability.

== Personal life ==
She met British–Cypriot doctor, Andreas Brown in London through mutual friends. She announced their engagement in late 2024, and they were married in April 2025, with a private family wedding held in Cairo at the St. Regis Hotel.

== Filmography ==
Film
Date	Title	Role	Notes
2008	Captin Hima	Noor	
2014	The Island 2	Hedya	
2016	Clash	Aisha	
2017	Nada	Nada	short film
2023	Sugar Daddy (2023 film)	Totti	
2026	Lee Cronin's The Mummy	Layla Khalil	

Television
Date	Title	Role	Notes
2008	A Girl From This Era		
2013	The Minors (El-Kaserat)	Bayada, wife of Abdel Qawi	TV show about illegal child marriages in Upper Egypt
2024	Massar Egbari (TV series)	Khadija	
