= Lee Cronin's The Mummy =

2026 film by Lee Cronin

- Theatrical release poster
- Directed by: Lee Cronin
- Written by: Lee Cronin
- Produced by: James Wan; Jason Blum; John Keville
- Starring: Jack Reynor; Laia Costa; May Calamawy; Verónica Falcón
- Cinematography: Dave Garbett
- Edited by: Bryan Shaw
- Music by: Stephen McKeon
- Production companies: New Line Cinema; Atomic Monster; Blumhouse Productions; Wicked/Good
- Distributed by: Warner Bros. Pictures
- Release dates: April 9, 2026 (American Legion Post 43); April 17, 2026 (United States)
- Running time: 132 minutes
- Countries: Ireland; United States
- Languages: English; Egyptian Arabic
- Budget: $22 million
- Box office: $90.6 million

Lee Cronin's The Mummy is a 2026 supernatural horror film written and directed by Lee Cronin. A reimagining of The Mummy franchise based on the Nasmaranian, an ancient Egyptian demon that possesses victims with exorcism themes, the film stars Jack Reynor, Laia Costa, May Calamawy, and Verónica Falcón. The film follows a family who is reunited with their long-missing, partially-mummified daughter, slowly realizing that she is possessed. James Wan and Jason Blum produced the film through their respective production banners Atomic Monster and Blumhouse Productions, alongside Wicked/Good. The film is a co-production between Ireland and the United States.

Lee Cronin's The Mummy premiered at the American Legion Post 43 in Los Angeles on April 9, 2026 and was released on April 17 by Warner Bros. Pictures in the United States. The film received mixed reviews from critics and has grossed $90.6 million worldwide on a $22 million production budget.

== Plot ==
In Aswan, Egypt, a man, a woman, their two sons, and their daughter, Layla, arrive home to find their pet bird mortally wounded. The parents go to the cellar, which is revealed to be built on a buried black pyramid. Inside, a black basalt sarcophagus contains mummified human remains that begin moving, and the father is killed by a supernatural force.

In Cairo, 2018, investigative TV reporter Charlie Cannon lives with his pregnant wife, Larissa, and their children Katie and Sebastián. Katie is friends with Layla. One morning, Katie is visited by the woman from Aswan, known as the Magician. She identifies herself as Layla's mother and uses candy to lure Katie away before kidnapping her. Charlie gives chase but loses them in a sandstorm. He and Larissa report the kidnapping to the authorities, working with an English-speaking junior detective, Dalia Zaki, while the lead detective suspects the parents.

Eight years later, in Albuquerque, New Mexico, Charlie, Larissa, Sebastián, and their third child, Maud, now live in the home of Larissa's Catholic mother, Carmen. In Aswan, a teenager hears a cargo plane carrying the sarcophagus crash. Inside, archaeologists find Katie wrapped in parchment inscribed with an ancient language. Katie, who is in a catatonic state and habitually self-harms, is moved back home with Charlie and Larissa.

The family refuses to seek further medical help despite Katie's erratic behavior, in which she frequently escapes her room and mutilates herself. After noticing the inscriptions inscribed on the linens wrapped around Katie's skin, Charlie consults an archaeology professor, who translates the writings. The inscriptions are about the Nasmaranian, an ancient demon who destroys families and communities but is kept at bay through ritual mummification that embeds the scripture into skin. As the containing scriptures are removed, the Nasmaranian becomes more powerful.

Charlie realizes that Katie is communicating via Morse code, which she had learned in the Girl Scouts before her abduction. He translates her message and realizes that she is saying Layla's name. He searches a collection of support letters received after Katie's kidnapping and finds an unopened letter from Layla, featuring a picture of the candy used to lure Katie. He relays the name to Dalia, who traces the letter to the house in Aswan. Dalia investigates the property and discovers the pyramid. The Magician ambushes her, but Dalia shoots her. Layla arrives home and gives Dalia a VHS tape labelled 'Katie'. Meanwhile, Katie sheds more of her bindings, takes control of her siblings' minds, and kills Carmen. At Carmen's funeral, Katie and Maud terrorize the guests and desecrate their grandmother's corpse.

Dalia travels to Albuquerque with the tape, which reveals the ritual that transferred the demon into Katie by the Magician. The latter is revealed as a member of an ancient cult that keeps the Nasmaranian buried by offering it live hosts. While Charlie and Larissa watch the tape, Katie hypnotizes Sebastián into helping remove more scripture from her body. She attacks her parents and Dalia, beating Charlie and forcing a scorpion into Dalia's throat. Having memorized the demonic transfer chant from the tape, Dalia transfers the Nasmaranian from Katie into Charlie, who willingly sacrifices himself. Bound inside a coffin in the basement, Charlie manages to tap "I love you" in Morse code. Katie, now free of demonic possession, begins to recover and build a proper relationship with her siblings.

Some time later, Larissa calls Dalia about Charlie. Back in Cairo, the Magician, having survived, is incarcerated. Larissa and Dalia arrive at her cell, sedate her, and reveal the possessed Charlie. Dalia starts the chant of the ritual that will free Charlie from possession while sacrificing the Magician.

== Cast ==
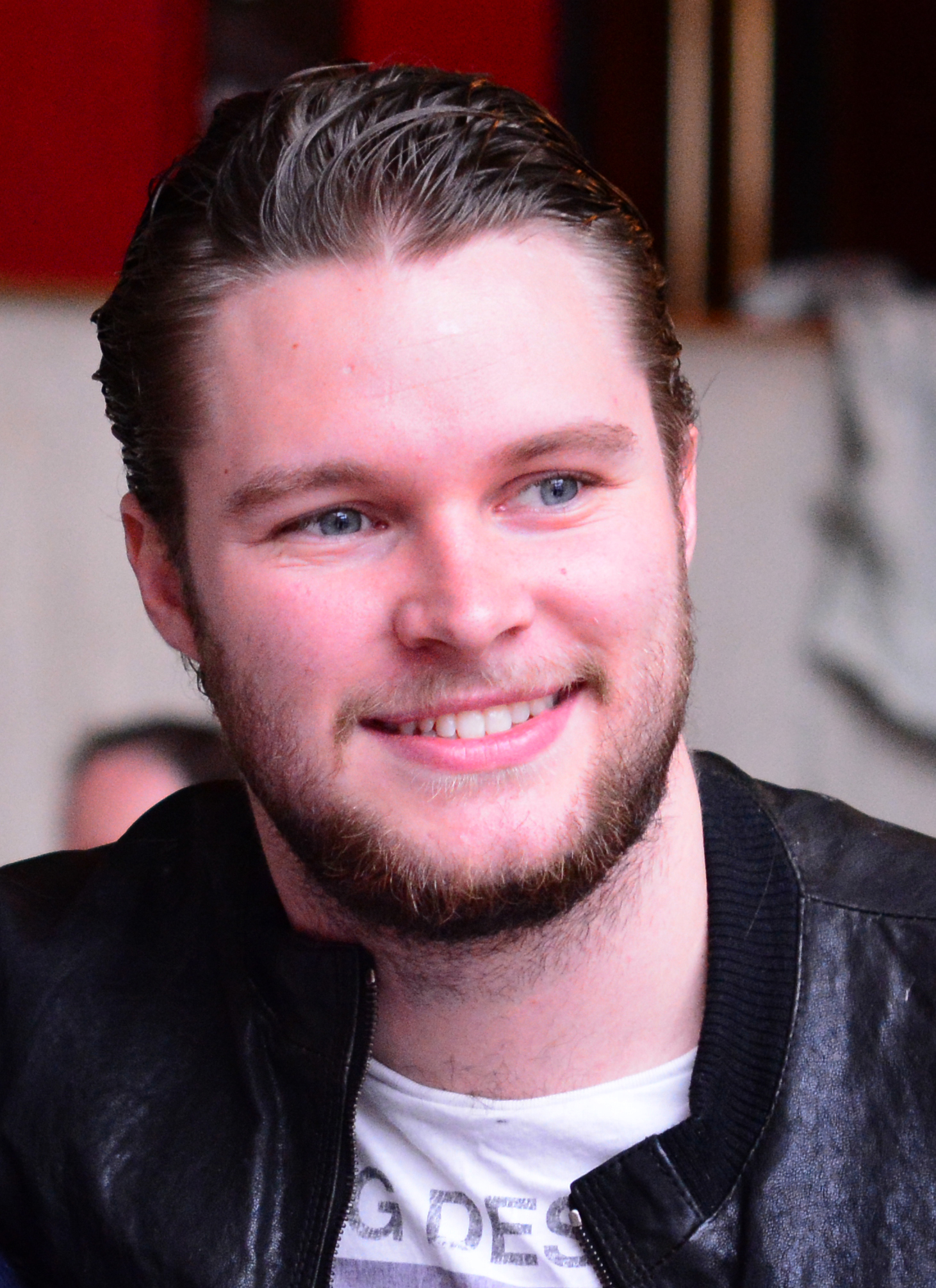
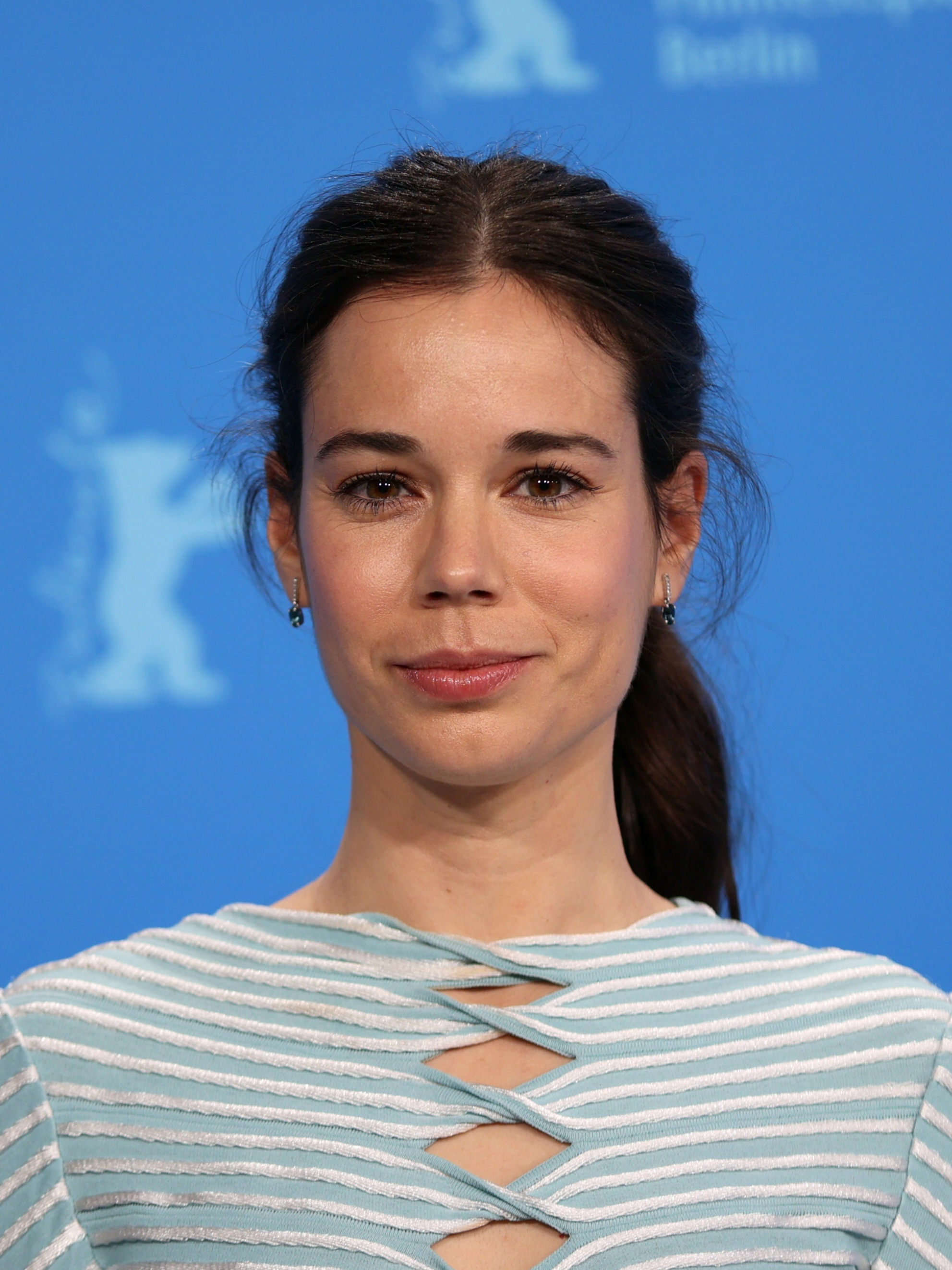
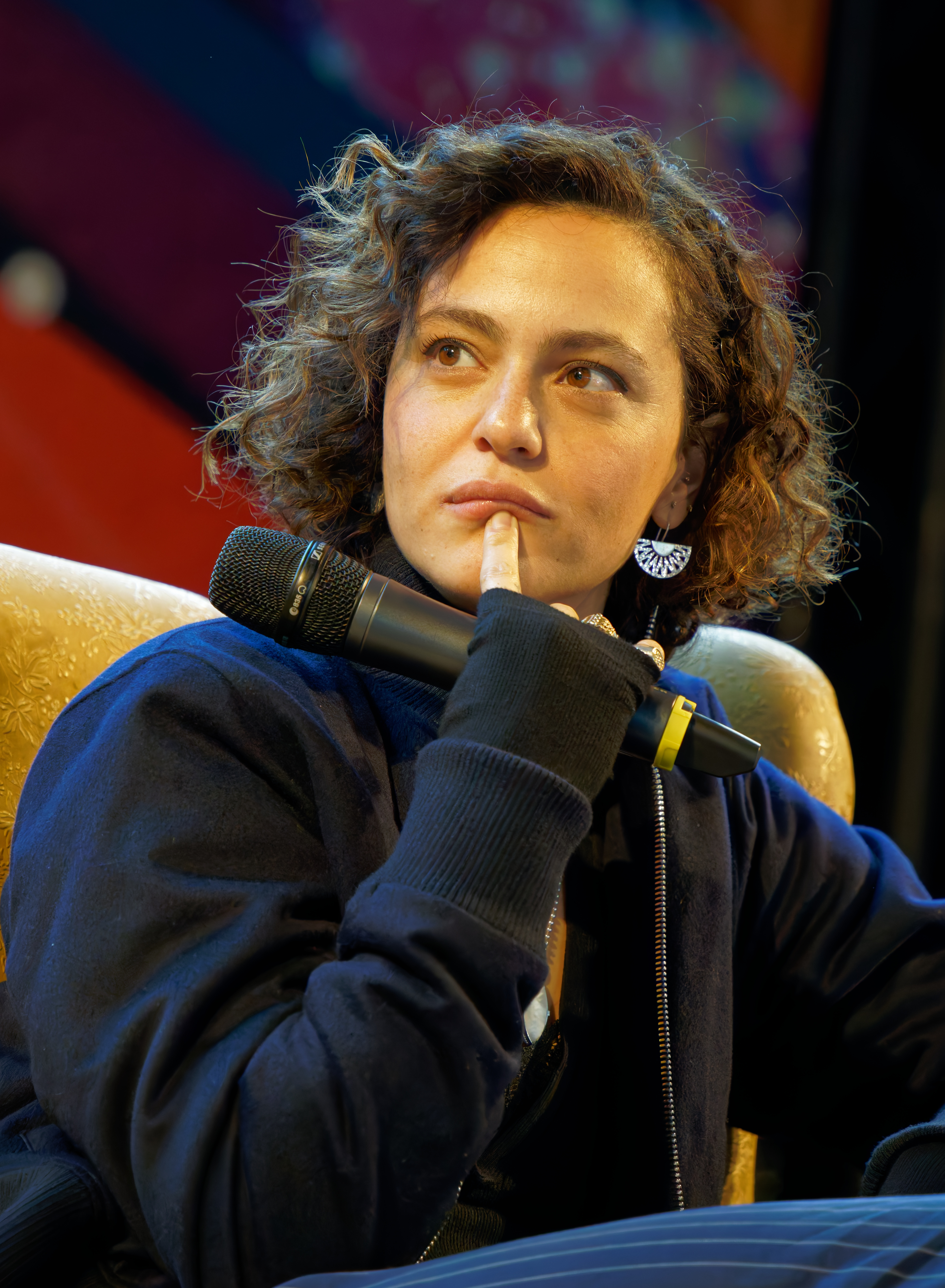
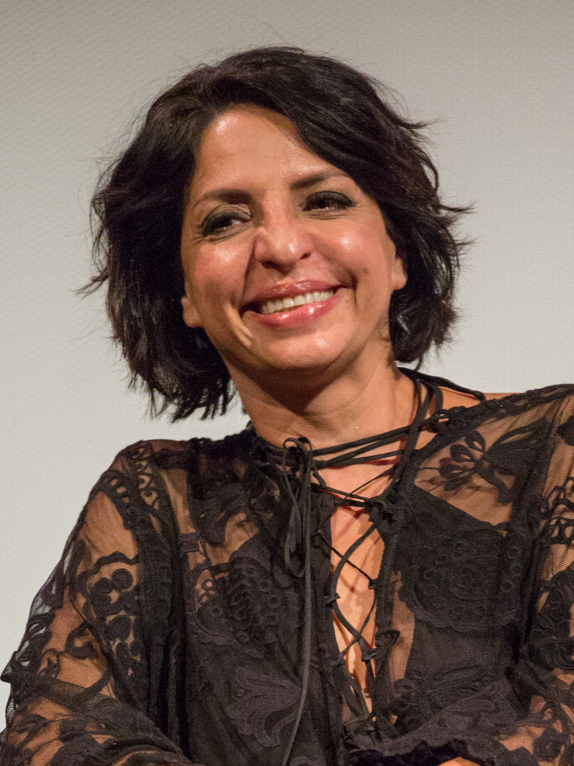
Lee Cronin's The Mummy stars (from the left) Jack Reynor, Laia Costa, May Calamawy, and Verónica Falcón.
- Jack Reynor as Charlie Cannon, a journalist
- Laia Costa as Larissa Cannon, Charlie's wife
- May Calamawy as Detective Dalia Zaki, a detective who investigates Katie's reappearance
- Natalie Grace as Katie Cannon, Charlie and Larissa's eldest child, who went missing
  - Emily Mitchell as young Katie
- Shylo Molina as Sebastián "Seb" Cannon, Charlie and Larissa's middle child and only son
  - Dean Allen Williams as young Sebastián
- Billie Roy as Maud "Maudie" Cannon, Charlie and Larissa's youngest child
- Verónica Falcón as Carmen Santiago, Larissa's mother
- Hayat Kamille as the Magician, Layla's mother
- May Elghety as Layla Khalil
  - Aisha Laouini as young Layla
- Husam Chadat as Detective Ismail, Dalia's partner
- Mark Mitchinson as Professor Bixler, an archeology scholar
- Lily Sullivan as Miss Mills, Maud's teacher
- Omar El-Saeidi as Gamal Khalil, Layla's father and the Magician's husband
- Arkin Cureklibatir as Jabari Khalil, Layla's younger brother
- Safi Mulki as Tariq Khalil, Layla's youngest brother

== Production ==
=== Development ===
In June 2024, New Line Cinema dated an untitled film written and directed by Lee Cronin for April 17, 2026. That December, the untitled film was revealed to be a reimagining of The Mummy franchise, entitled Lee Cronin's The Mummy, with James Wan, Jason Blum and John Keville producing it. Blumhouse Productions, Atomic Monster, and Cronin's production banner Doppelgängers (later renamed Wicked/Good) produced for New Line Cinema. Wan said that most of the people who grew up in the two decades preceding the release of Lee Cronin's The Mummy only know of the mummy from Stephen Sommers' film, The Mummy (1999), and for that reason he wanted to make sure that Cronin's film was distinct from Sommers' film by having a name-branded title. Producer Jason Blum had the idea to put Cronin's name in the title. Cronin was unsure about it at first, but ended up accepting it. Having Cronin's name in the title was also a way to avoid confusion with previous The Mummy films. Online rumors claimed the film would be retitled The Resurrected, but it was later debunked by Cronin, who explained that films often have code words to protect them. Cronin said the studio believed in him and he had total control over the film.

The film is not connected to previous Mummy films made by Universal Pictures. Up until the release date, the official Blumhouse Twitter account repeatedly tweeted, "Brendan Fraser is not in Lee Cronin's The Mummy" to clarify the film's independence from the previous films. Producer James Wan asked Cronin to make a Mummy film. Cronin then told Wan that he wanted to try something that he was not familiar with, so Wan asked him, "What about trying to make a really terrifying Mummy movie?", and Cronin accepted the offer. Cronin turned down a sequel to Evil Dead Rise (2023) to direct The Mummy.

Cronin wanted to reinvent the Mummy monster and switch it from a pharaoh in a golden sarcophagus to an average person being mummified. Some of the ideas for the film came from Cronin's real-life grief while dealing with the death of his mother, who died the same day he finished Evil Dead Rise. Cronin said that he initially had no interest in The Mummy, but working on the film helped him process the death of his mother, who died before watching Evil Dead Rise, and The Mummy is a response to that. A phone call that Cronin had to make to someone about keeping his mother's false teeth when bringing her home for her wake, inspired a scene in the film.

Cronin's research process for the visual of the mummy in the film included surveying everything from North African visual references to the preserved "bog bodies" housed at Dublin's National Museum.

=== Casting ===
In March 2025, Jack Reynor and Laia Costa were cast in the film. In the subsequent months, Verónica Falcón, May Calamawy, May Elghety, Natalie Grace, Shylo Molina and Billie Roy joined the cast. In July, Hayat Kamille was added to the cast. In April 2026, Cronin revealed that Lily Sullivan, the lead of Cronin's previous film Evil Dead Rise (2023), has a cameo in the film as a teacher, after she personally requested to appear in the film.

Cronin told IGN that one of the things that he is proud of about this film is that it has an authentic Egyptian cast and lots of Arabic language. Cronin added that the scenes between Calamawy and Elghety are some of his favorites. Calamawy and Elghety are the only Egyptian actors in the cast. Elghety was the only one who grew up in Egypt and was able to help with the production with the proper colloquial language. Calamawy, who is Egyptian-Palestinian and grew up in different countries speaking more Shami (Levantine Arabic) than Egyptian Arabic, had to work on her Egyptian dialect for The Mummy.

=== Filming ===
Principal photography began in Ireland and Spain on March 24, 2025, and concluded on June 25.

=== Influences ===
Cronin described The Mummy as "one part Poltergeist (1982) and one part Seven (1995), but put through my lens and the way that I like to entertain people." Cronin also cited Breaking Bad (2008–2013) as an inspiration for the color palette. Other influences include Egyptian mythology and Catholic faith.

== Release ==
=== Theatrical ===
Lee Cronin's The Mummy premiered on April 9, 2026, at the American Legion Post 43 cinema in Los Angeles, and was released in theaters in the United States on April 17, 2026, by Warner Bros. Pictures. It was also released in IMAX theaters.

=== Home media ===
Lee Cronin's The Mummy was released on digital streaming on May 19, 2026, followed by 4K Ultra HD Blu-ray, Blu-ray, and DVD on July 14, 2026.

== Reception ==
=== Box office ===
Lee Cronin's The Mummy grossed $29.2 million in the United States and Canada, and $61.4 million in other territories, for a worldwide total of $90.6 million. Variety estimated the film would turn a profit of around $10 million for Warner Bros.

In the United States and Canada The Mummy was released alongside Normal and was projected to gross around $12 million from 3,304 theaters in its opening weekend. The film made $1.5 million from Thursday night previews. It opened to $13.5 million, ranking third for the weekend behind The Super Mario Galaxy Movie and Project Hail Mary, while earning an additional $20.9 million internationally from 78 markets.

=== Critical response ===
On the review aggregator website Rotten Tomatoes, 47% of 187 critics' reviews are positive, with an average rating of 5.6/10. The website's consensus reads: "Director Lee Cronin's take on The Mummy injects some juicy gore and personal stakes into the classic horror setup but the scares in this gross-out extravaganza get entombed by a padded running time." Metacritic, which uses a weighted average, assigned the film a score of 47 out of 100, based on 36 critics, indicating "mixed or average" reviews. Audiences polled by CinemaScore gave the film an average grade of "C+" on an A+ to F scale.

Johnny Oleksinski for New York Post gave the film one-and-a-half stars out of four, calling it a "gross horror flick" that "is just The Exorcist with gauze", while also writing: "The director mostly reshapes what a mummy actually is to suit his lackluster whims." Radheyan Simonpillai of Globe and Mail stated that "we didn't even need 'mummy' in the title since Cronin's version really made a mess of an Exorcist movie that also crams in bits from Don't Look Now, Hereditary and The Evil Dead". Brian Tallerico of RogerEbert.com gave the film two stars out of four, writing: "There's just never a weight to that idea because these characters are just pawns in Cronin's game, his attempt to make you squirm as much as possible. You'll definitely squirm but mostly out of boredom." Benjamin Lee of The Guardian gave the film two stars out of five, writing that the film was "absurdly, watch-checkingly overlong, tonally unsure and, fatally, not all that scary". Guy Lodge of Variety wrote that while "the result is more generic than its braggy auteur claims might promise", "there's a lot here for gorehounds to feast on", also pointing out that the pile-up of revelations and jump scares turns out to be "quite exhausting".
