= Wild Cherry (TV series) =

- Created by: Nicôle Lecky
- Directed by: Toby MacDonald
- Music by: Rotem Frimer
- Country of origin: United Kingdom
- Original language: English
- No. of series: 1
- No. of episodes: 6

Production
- Executive producers: Elizabeth Kilgariff; Craig Holleworth; Nicôle Lecky; Lisa Walters; Toby MacDonald
- Producer: Ado Yoshizaki Cassuto
- Production location: United Kingdom
- Running time: 54 minutes
- Production company: Firebird Pictures

Original release
- Network: BBC One
- Release: 15 November 2025 – present

Wild Cherry is a British television series created by Nicôle Lecky for BBC One. The series premiered on 15 November 2025.

== Cast and characters ==
- Carmen Ejogo as Lorna Gibbons
- Eve Best as Juliet Lonsdale
- Amelia May as Allegra Lonsdale, Juliet's daughter
- Imogen Faires as Grace Gibbons, Lorna's daughter
- Nicôle Lecky as Gigi
- Sophie Winkleman as Frances
- Katarina Čas as Jelena
- Hayat Kamille as Maryam
- Isabelle Allen as Jocasta
- Tara Webb as Noori
- Nathaniel Martello-White as Steven Gibbons
- James Murray as Raef Lonsdale
- Jason York as K Rizz
- Angela Sari as Trina
- Nina Cassells as Amay
- Janine Duvitski as Geraldine
- Archie Barnes as Arthur Lonsdale
- Mia-Nicole Alexander Constable as Mia Gibbons
- John Marquez as Freddie Gladstone
- Jessica Emens as Emma
- Louis Ashbourne Serkis as Hugo
- Will Bagnall as Jacob
- Anders Hayward as Charlie
- Daniel Lapaine as Daniel
- Sonita Henry as Detective Khan
- Catriona Chandler as Iris
- Hugh Quarshie as Jeremy Trevy

== Production ==
Produced by Firebird Pictures, Nicôle Lecky's second television project—the first one being Mood, a 2022 musical drama television series aired on BBC Three and based on her 2018 one-woman play Superhoe—was first teased by the BBC at the 2023 Edinburgh Television Festival in a slate of forthcoming dramas.

The series is directed by Toby MacDonald, with Elizabeth Kilgariff, Craig Holleworth and Lisa Walters as executive producers and Ado Yoshizaki Cassuto as producer.

In October 2024, it was announced Eve Best and Carmen Ejogo would star as Juliet and Lorna respectively alongside Amelia May and Imogen Faires as their daughters. Lecky herself and Sophie Winkleman would feature. Also joining the cast were Daniel Lapaine, Hayat Kamille, Isabelle Allen, James Murray, Jason York, Katarina Čas, Nathaniel Martello-White, Sonita Henry, Tara Webb, Will Bagnall and Hugh Quarshie.

Principal photography took place in Surrey.

== Release ==
The BBC revealed first look images in February 2025.
