= Marcella (TV series) =

British television series

- Genre: Crime noir Nordic noir
- Created by: Hans Rosenfeldt; Nicola Larder
- Written by: Hans Rosenfeldt
- Starring: Anna Friel; Nicholas Pinnock; Ray Panthaki; Jamie Bamber; Jack Doolan; Nina Sosanya; Charlie Covell; Sophia Brown; Amanda Burton; Hugo Speer; Aaron McCusker; Martin McCann; Kelly Gough; Michael Colgan
- Opening theme: "Fall" — The Bug, featuring Inga Copeland
- Composer: Lorne Balfe
- Country of origin: United Kingdom
- Original language: English
- No. of series: 3
- No. of episodes: 24

Production
- Executive producers: Hans Rosenfeldt; Nicola Larder; Tony Wood
- Producer: Andrew Woodhead
- Production locations: London, UK (2016–2018); Belfast, Northern Ireland, UK (2021)
- Cinematography: Ula Pontikos
- Editor: Liana Del Giudice
- Running time: 42–46 minutes
- Production companies: Buccaneer Media; Amber Entertainment

Original release
- Network: ITV (UK); Netflix (International)
- Release: 4 April 2016 – 16 March 2021

Marcella is a British Nordic noir detective series written, directed and produced by Swedish screenwriter Hans Rosenfeldt, creator of The Bridge. The series is produced by Buccaneer Media for ITV and distributed worldwide by Buccaneer's parent company Cineflix. It was first shown on ITV on 4 April 2016, with seven further episodes released weekly.

The series stars Anna Friel as Marcella Backland, a former London detective who returns to work to investigate an open case from 11 years earlier involving an unidentified serial killer who appears to have become active again. She has a hectic home life as her husband, Jason (Nicholas Pinnock), has decided to leave her, and their two children are in boarding school. Nina Sosanya (series one), Ray Panthaki and Jamie Bamber are also credited as principal members of the cast.

The series was commissioned in June 2015, with location filming taking place in London and the Port of Dover. After their first release on ITV, the episodes were made available to stream on Netflix outside the United Kingdom. The first series was released on DVD via Universal Pictures UK on 20 June 2016. In 2017, Friel was awarded the International Emmy Award for Best Actress for her performance in Marcella.

On 26 August 2016, ITV announced that a second series had been commissioned. The second series premiered on 19 February 2018 and was released on DVD on 16 April 2018. On 3 October 2018 it was announced that Marcella would be returning to ITV for a third series. It premiered internationally on Netflix on 14 June 2020, and began airing on ITV in the UK on 26 January 2021; it was also expected to be released on DVD in March 2021.

== Synopsis ==
=== Series 1 ===
Marcella Backland (Anna Friel), a former London Metropolitan Police Service detective, decides to return to work after her husband of 15 years, Jason (Nicholas Pinnock), abruptly announces he is leaving her. Marcella resumes her investigation into the three unsolved Grove Park murders from 2005, when it appears the serial killer responsible has returned.

=== Series 2 ===
Marcella investigates a serial killer of children, encountering a paedophile, an arrogant millionaire, a 1970s rock star, and strange symbols relating to witchcraft. Her estranged husband Jason, has become engaged to his rehab nurse even though their divorce is not yet finalised, putting their children in the middle of a custody battle that quickly becomes ugly. Marcella's blackouts continue, and she seeks counselling to help her remember what happened during them.

=== Series 3 ===
Marcella has assumed a new identity as Keira Devlin and is working undercover in Northern Ireland, where she becomes involved with a wealthy crime family. More is learned of Marcella's mental health issues.

== Cast ==
=== Main ===
- Anna Friel as Detective Sergeant Marcella Backland
- Nicholas Pinnock as Jason Backland (series 1–2)
- Ray Panthaki as Detective Chief Inspector/Detective Inspector Rav Sangha
- Jamie Bamber as Detective Chief Inspector/Detective Inspector Tim Williamson (series 1–2)
- Jack Doolan as Detective Constable Mark Travis (series 1–2)
- Nina Sosanya as Detective Chief Inspector Laura Porter (series 1)
- Charlie Covell as Detective Constable Alex Dier (series 1)
- Sophia Brown as Detective Constable Leanne Hunter (series 2)
- Amanda Burton as Katherine Maguire (series 3)
- Hugo Speer as Frank Young (series 3; guest series 2)
- Aaron McCusker as Finn Maguire (series 3)
- Martin McCann as Bobby Barrett (series 3)
- Kelly Gough as Stacey Maguire Barrett (series 3)
- Michael Colgan as Rory Maguire (series 3)

=== Recurring ===
==== Series 1 ====
- Sinéad Cusack as Sylvie Gibson
- Harry Lloyd as Henry Gibson
- Laura Carmichael as Maddy Stevenson
- Maeve Dermody as Grace Gibson
- Patrick Baladi as Stephen Holmes
- Stephen Lord as Stuart Callaghan
- Ian Puleston-Davies as Peter Cullen
- Tobias Santelmann as Yann Hall
- Florence Pugh as Cara Thomas
- Ben Cura as Matthew Neil
- Andrew Lancel as Clive Bonn

==== Series 2 ====
- Keith Allen as Alan Summers
- Nigel Planer as Reg Reynolds
- Jason Hughes as Vince Whitman
- Victoria Smurfit as Maya Whitman
- Peter Sullivan as Phil Dawkins
- Amy Dawson as Nina Dawkins
- Josh Herdman as Eric Davidson
- Harriet Cains as Gail Davidson
- Victoria Broom as Sascha
- Tamzin Malleson as Jojo
- Vivienne Gibbs as Dr. Tracey Lewis
- Andrew Tiernan as Nigel Stafford
- Michelle Terry as Jane Colletti

==== Series 3 ====
- Laurence Kinlan as Jack Healy
- Valerie Lilley as Megan Healy
- Emily Flain as Jessie Healy
- Eugene O'Hare as Detective Constable Eddie Lyons

=== Supporting ===
==== Series 1 ====
- George Anton as Andrew Barnes
- Yasen Atour as Mohammed El-Said
- Jasmine Breinburg as Lea Coombes
- David Fahm as Greg Brady
- Imogen Faires as Emma Backland
- Otto Farrant as Evan Jones
- Asher Flowers as Edward Backland
- Nick Hendrix as Adrian Cooper
- Emil Hostina as Bendek Krol
- Rob Jarvis as Don Parkin
- Shivani Kapur as Beth Bachan
- Youssef Kerkour as Hassan El-Said
- Isobel Middleton as Victoria Daughton
- Toby Wharton as Ronnie Weir
- Robert Whitelock as Guy Roberts
- Susannah Wise as Linda Callaghan

==== Series 2 ====
- Lucy Speed as Leslie Evans
- Michael Wildman as Nathan Priestley
- Clara Indrani as Amanda Priestley
- Yolanda Kettle as Becky Marani
- Asher Flowers as Edward Backland
- Imogen Faires as Emma Backland
- Aldo Maland as Luke Howell
- Oaklee Pendergast as Adam Evans
- Miltos Yerolemou as Yanis

==== Series 3 ====
- Paul Kennedy as Lawrence Corrigan
- Jorin Cooke as Conor Scott
- James Martin as Danny Armstrong

== Episodes ==
=== Overview ===
Series	Episodes	Originally released (UK)		Netflix release date (international)	Ave. UK viewers (millions)
Series	Episodes	First released	Last released	Netflix release date (international)	Ave. UK viewers (millions)
1	8	4 April 2016	17 May 2016	1 July 2016	7.59
2	8	19 February 2018	9 April 2018	9 June 2018	5.12
3	8	26 January 2021	16 March 2021	14 June 2020	2.97

=== Series 1 (2016) ===
No. overall	No. in series	Title	Directed by	Written by	Original release date	UK viewers (millions)
1	1	"Episode 1"	Charles Martin	Hans Rosenfeldt	4 April 2016	9.18
Former detective Marcella is devastated when her husband of 15 years, Jason, suddenly announces he is leaving her and no longer loves her. She is visited by the detective in charge of an investigation linked to the Grove Park murders, one of Marcella's former unsolved cases. The case involves a serial killer whom the police believe has begun to kill again after 11 years. Marcella decides to return to work after several years spent raising their two children, Emma and Edward, who are away at boarding school. Reinstated with her old rank of detective sergeant, Marcella has a very different idea about who should be the main suspect and tells her new superior, to no avail. She discovers her husband, who works as a legal advisor for DTG Construction property developers, is having an affair with Grace Gibson, the CFO of the firm and daughter of the owner, Sylvie Gibson.
2	2	"Episode 2"	Charles Martin	Hans Rosenfeldt	11 April 2016	8.37
Grace Gibson is reported missing, and Marcella vaguely remembers visiting her the previous evening to confront her about Jason. Marcella is warned by her superiors to stop harassing Peter Cullen, her prime suspect, who is in prison for killing his wife in a domestic incident, but is allowed out several days a week to work at a bakery under supervision. Marcella believes Peter has a personality disorder and cannot handle rejection. Marcella herself is being secretly treated for a disorder that causes memory blackouts. Webcam girl Cara, who meets people via a cheating app and steals from them, is threatened in her internet chatroom by someone she has stolen from. Marcella is drawn to a wood on Hampstead Heath by memories and discovers Grace's body bound with a plastic bag over her head — fitting the pattern of the Grove Park murders.
3	3	"Episode 3"	Charles Martin	Hans Rosenfeldt	18 April 2016	7.55
Marcella fails to report the body, which is later revealed to be that of Grace Gibson, now believed to be the fourth victim of the serial killer. Marcella's early hopes of a reconciliation with her husband may be fruitless when she discovers that he had been having an affair for more than three years, and Grace was pregnant. Jason loses his job when Sylvie discovers the affair. Marcella's former partner, DCI Laura Porter, allows her to keep working on the case with some restrictions. The police realise Cara, who has been selling the items she steals at a pawn shop, can identify the killer but, as Marcella closes in, Cara is intentionally struck and killed in a hit-and-run. The man supposed to be supervising Peter Cullen during his work release is arrested for breaking and entering, confirming Marcella's suspicion that Cullen had the opportunity to continue killing. Cullen is released on parole and begins stalking criminology student Maddy Stevenson, who has been meeting him for research for her dissertation. Studying CCTV, the police discover that Clive Bonn had been at Hampstead Heath around the time Gibson's body was left there, and also learn that Marcella had been studying CCTV around Grace Gibson's home — prior to her body being found.
4	4	"Episode 4"	Jonathan Teplitzky	Hans Rosenfeldt and Marston Bloom	25 April 2016	7.50
Marcella insists she didn't know about Grace's affair with Jason and was merely looking at the CCTV around her home because she was missing. Ordered to check CCTV again, Marcella discovers a taxi parked outside Grace's home the night she was murdered. The taxi driver, Hassan El-Sayed, claims he was trying to sleep and did not see anything; in reality, his brother, Mohamed, living in the UK illegally on an expired tourist visa, had really been the one driving the cab, and he tells Hassan he remembers a woman taking a heavy item from Grace's home. Marcella fakes her DNA so she cannot be linked to the blood from an unknown woman found at Grace's home. Maddy arrives home to find Peter Cullen waiting for her, angered after reading her speculation that he is the Grove Park killer. After discovering that Maddy's boyfriend, Adrian, was found dead on the river shore, Marcella races to Maddy's home and saves her from Cullen. Circumstantial evidence at the scene makes Marcella realise that while Cullen committed the 2005 murders, the latest killings were done by a copycat.
5	5	"Episode 5"	Jonathan Teplitzky	Hans Rosenfeldt and Ben Harris	2 May 2016	7.15
Peter Cullen confesses to the 2005 murders. Feeling a sense of civic responsibility, Hassan finds Marcella and tells her he now remembers seeing a woman leaving Grace's flat and putting something into a black Audi. Marcella, who drives a black Audi, does not report this. After Hassan is found shot through the head, the police discover that it was really his brother, Mo, outside Grace's flat. Marcella discovers evidence that allays her own fears regarding Grace's death: Cara had stolen a necklace belonging to Grace that her killer had taken as a trophy. Jason gets his job back with the help of Henry, Grace's half-brother, but a councillor, Andrew Barnes, is dead. Deliveryman Ron Weir returns from a job to find his 6-year-old daughter, May, missing, and his neighbour, Beth, murdered by the serial killer.
6	6	"Episode 6"	Jonathan Teplitzky	Hans Rosenfeldt and Mark Greig	9 May 2016	7.21
Marcella and her police colleagues desperately search for May, who has been taken by the serial killer, along with her backpack. May's father calls the phone she had in her backpack, which causes the serial killer to panic and dispose of her phone along the way. Marcella and her team find his burnt-out car and the drowned girl nearby. Marcella frantically attempts CPR on the young girl, whom she calls Juliet, but is unable to save her; Juliet was the name of Marcella's own baby daughter who died of cot death several years earlier. DNA evidence leads to the arrest of Yann Hall, the boyfriend of Henry Gibson's childhood friend, Matthew. The apparent suicide of Andrew Barnes is being investigated, but the pathologist suspects foul play. Jason Backland tries to disconnect himself from any involvement by paying off his private investigator, Stuart, who himself is being blackmailed by his lodger, Polish immigrant Bendek Krol. Mo, the brother of the taxi driver who was murdered, breaks into Marcella's home.
7	7	"Episode 7"	Henrik Georgsson	Hans Rosenfeldt	16 May 2016	6.97
When Mo seeks a confession that Marcella killed his brother, she only confesses that she moved Grace's body. The evidence against Yann Hall begins to break down, pointing towards his boyfriend, Matthew Neil. Jason Backland comes under suspicion regarding the murder of Andrew Barnes. Stuart and Bendek conspire to blackmail Jason, then Bendek blackmails Stuart. Bendek is found dead in his room. The police determined the cause was autoerotic asphyxiation. However, because of Bendek's ties to their murder investigation, they were able to confiscate Bendek's possessions, including his phone. Bendek's phone contains pictures of Stuart meeting with Jason. Henry appears to be mending fences with Sylvie. Matthew Neil appears to have absconded abroad, but he's really being held captive by Henry Gibson. Marcella accepts that her marriage is over.
8	8	"Episode 8"	Henrik Georgsson	Hans Rosenfeldt	17 May 2016	6.80
Unable to find Matthew Neil, Marcella's attention turns to his best friend, Henry Gibson. She tracks his phone to a bar the night Grace was murdered — a bar that was closed and burgled, yet nothing was taken that night. Jason realises Marcella's suspicions, and he goes to Henry's home to confront him. Marcella follows on and finds Jason stabbed. Henry attacks her, and she blacks out; when she comes to, Henry is handcuffed with a plastic bag over his head. Marcella barely revives him. When Marcella's colleagues arrive, she is accused by Henry of attacking and trying to kill him, while Henry claims he stabbed Jason in self-defence. Given 12 hours to find evidence against Henry, Marcella realises from the CCTV footage that May bit her kidnapper; a bite mark on Henry's shoulder confirms his guilt. DI Tim Williamson's investigation of Andrew Barnes' murder uncovers the possible involvement of Marcella's husband and previously doctored CCTV footage placing Marcella near Grace's home on the night Grace was murdered.

=== Series 2 (2018) ===
No. overall	No. in series	Title	Directed by	Written by	Original release date	UK viewers (millions)
9	1	"Episode 1"	Charles Martin	Hans Rosenfeldt	19 February 2018	5.83
The discovery of a schoolboy's body in the wall of a derelict flat has personal repercussions for Marcella because the victim is identified as Leo Priestley, a close friend of her son Edward. Leo disappeared in 2014, when the boys were 9, while Edward was supposed to be walking home from school with him. The occupier of the neighbouring flat, ageing rocker Reg Reynolds, is questioned about the discovery but denies any involvement. Reg was out of the country on a tour at the time and has since had a stroke causing aphasia. Marcella suspects that convicted child sex offender Phil Dawkins, who was seen ogling the crime scene as police and forensic officers arrived, may be involved. Businessman Vince Whitman gets bad press when his business practices — hiring teenagers for low pay and then changing them to zero-hour contracts when they are older — are exposed. Marcella returns to the flat where Leo was found and is attacked by an unseen individual. Experiencing a blackout, Marcella attacks Becky, Jason's fiancée, who she mistakes for someone abducting Edward. After her attack on Becky, Marcella finally admits to Jason that she suffers from blackouts. He threatens to keep the children away from her if she doesn't get help. Another schoolboy, Adam Evans, is abducted. Someone is watching Marcella in her home using her own laptop webcam.
10	2	"Episode 2"	Charles Martin	Hans Rosenfeldt	26 February 2018	5.18
Instead of offering Marcella help with her blackouts, Jason prepares to use her situation as ammunition to get sole custody of the children. The discovery of a second body in the boot of a car involved in a car crash leads the team to suspect there is more to the case than initially meets the eye. The boy, 15, had been working illegally at a brothel and, like Leo, was lobotomised before his death. Phil Dawkins' DNA is found at Reg's flat. DC Mark Travis discovers a possible link to a local car garage but, before Marcella and Rav can retrieve any vital evidence, the garage is burnt to the ground. Mark is stalking Marcella via the webcam on her home computer. Adam is being held captive in a house by an unknown abductor who surgically implants discs with strange symbols on them into his abdomen — the same type of discs found on Leo and the boy found in the boot. Edward, who feels guilty for leaving Leo alone, begins to act strangely, killing his pet mouse.
11	3	"Episode 3"	Charles Martin	Hans Rosenfeldt	5 March 2018	4.81
Vince invites the press to his factory for a publicity stunt during which he throws £20,000 in cash out to his workers; one young worker, MMA fighter Eric, is sacked after scuffling with another worker during the ensuing melee. Eric's sister, single mum Gail, discovers that one of her patients at a care facility, who suffered brain damage in an accident, is able to spell out messages using his fingers. Jason serves Marcella papers, which will allow him to take sole custody of the children, whom he plans to move to Singapore for a new job opportunity. He tells her that if she doesn't sign the papers, he will tell everyone about her blackouts. He provokes her into a blackout, and when she revives, she sees Jason, whom she has presumably attacked, covered in blood and looking at her with disgust. Rav is angered when he suspects Marcella may have leaked Phil Dawkins' home address to the press. When journalists harass them, the stress sends Phil's partner, Nina, into labour three months prematurely, which results in their son being stillborn. A professor identifies the symbols as talismans used to ward off evil in Colonial Massachusetts. Vince's wife, Maya, who runs a charity for at-risk youth, decides she has had enough. She is infatuated with Tim, who is on the board of the charity, and tells him she is leaving Vince. Adam escapes the house after five days in captivity.
12	4	"Episode 4"	Charles Sturridge	Hans Rosenfeldt	12 March 2018	4.89
Adam is rescued by an older couple in a passing car, which is pushed onto the path of an oncoming train by a blue lorry. The couple is killed but Adam survives. Doctors report that Adam, who is in a coma, was sexually abused, but that the abuse predated his kidnapping. Police discover that a 14-year-old girl, Debbie Canavan, disappeared in 1986 after going backstage at a Swiss Coast concert — Reg Reynolds' band. Marcella visits a psychiatrist for hypnosis and recalls details from her last blackout — and that Jason intentionally injured himself to manipulate her. Phil Dawkins exacts his revenge on Marcella, turning up at her home when she is at the therapist's and posing as a police officer to gain Edward's trust. Mark, thanks to his covert surveillance, prevents Dawkins from sexually assaulting Edward by anonymously calling the police. After Marcella listens to his 999 call, instead of having him sacked, she forces him to look for compromising information on Jason and Becky. Sascha and her partner, Jojo, who both work at the Whitman Foundation, argue over the cost of another round of IVF that Jojo desperately wants. Maya rejects Sascha's request for a raise but offers her money under the table if Sascha helps her with something illegal. The family of Gail's patient, Joel, complains about her when he experiences a seizure while communicating with her.
13	5	"Episode 5"	Charles Sturridge	Hans Rosenfeldt & Camilla Ahlgren	19 March 2018	5.08
Marcella is able to remember the events of the night that Grace was murdered. Through analysis of the tachograph found on the lorry that acted as a catalyst in the train crash, Mark is able to pinpoint a possible location where Adam was being held. When they eventually locate the property, the team are stunned to find Victorian-style post-mortem photos of 17 dead children hung on a wall, including Leo and the boy found in the boot, all posed with toys. Marcella is perturbed by the strange reaction of a neighbour, Nigel Stafford, who refuses to speak with her. As the case quickly intensifies, one of the victims is identified as a promising amateur boxer who disappeared three years ago. The case leads the police to Vince, who serves as a mentor at a boxing club and was the last person to see the boy alive. Another promising boxer, 14-year-old Karim, had disappeared days earlier. Eric, who recorded Karim getting into Vince's Ferrari, attempts to blackmail Vince. Eric threatens Vince to give the footage to the police, but Vince refuses to give him money. Reg confides in Alan Summers, Swiss Coast's longtime manager, that he has pancreatic cancer. Edward's girlfriend, Samantha, breaks up with him because of his odd behaviour. Gail ignores her boss's order and tries again to communicate with Joel. Joel, who has the same scar on his stomach that Adam and the dead boys had, spells out, "No accident."
14	6	"Episode 6"	Charles Sturridge	Hans Rosenfeldt	26 March 2018	5.16
Vince is arrested after being picked out of a lineup by Nigel, who claims he saw him at the house where Adam was held. He denies any involvement in the murders and informs Marcella that his wife is sleeping with Tim, who therefore has a vested interest in determining his guilt. Marcella confronts Tim, who accuses Marcella of being paranoid because of Jason's infidelity. Vince is released when Karim shows up alive; Eric, desperate for money, orchestrated his disappearance in order to blackmail Vince, who finally paid him. Alan visits the station with Reg's letter of confession, claiming that he has gone missing, and he is concerned for his welfare. After the body is found, Marcella tells Alan she doubts Reg wrote the confession letter and that she suspects he is behind Reg's death. Old newspaper articles from Debbie Canavan's disappearance lead Marcella to Samantha's mother, Jane, who was with Debbie the night she vanished. Becky shows up at Gail's work to ask her questions about Joel; Gail suddenly disappears. Edward confesses that he and Leo had a fight shortly before the boy disappeared and that he remembered a car following them. A toy found with one of the boys is traced to Vince's business, which traces it to Maya. Sascha returns the money to Maya because Vince is being investigated for murder. Jojo then goes to a disco, has sex with a stranger, and the next day takes home a drug to prevent pregnancy. Amateur paranormal investigators, who break into buildings that are supposedly haunted, post video taken several years earlier of their visit to the house where Adam was held captive. Marcella feeds information about Vince's arrest to the press in order to obtain the full video footage, which leads her to suspect the murderer may be female. They also discovered the killer had somehow hidden a female body in the police station, where it had since decomposed.
15	7	"Episode 7"	Jim O'Hanlon	Hans Rosenfeldt	2 April 2018	5.04
Maya's attempt to leave Vince backfires badly and ends up with Tim under investigation for embezzling from the foundation, using transactions she had herself made to frame Vince. Marcella finds out from Mark that Becky once worked on a yacht involved in a hooker scandal. The body found at the police station is revealed to be that of a troubled teen girl; like several of the other victims, the police trace her to KidsCall, a crisis help desk run by the Whitman Foundation. The professor now believes the discs with the symbols are not to keep evil away, but to prevent it from escaping. Nigel, the uncooperative neighbour, reveals his girlfriend, Rosio, has been abducted, and he is communicating online with the kidnapper, who forced him to pick Vince out of the police lineup. Mark resumes communication with the abductor, but it abruptly stops again at the same time that Sascha shuts her laptop while using a similar application (pointing to the fact that she was the one telling Nigel what to do). Vince picks up Sascha, and subsequently, Mark receives an address where Rosio will be released. Mark remains at Nigel's home, attempting to trace the abductor while the police search for her. When Rosio's body is found, Nigel kills Mark and then kills himself (pointing to Rosio's killing being ordered by Vince). Eric confronts both Gail's boss and Vince about his sister's disappearance. Samantha's mother, Jane, sees bruises on her daughter and believes Edward caused them, leading to their breakup. Edward shows up at their house to talk to Samantha, and Jane drugs him.
16	8	"Episode 8"	Jim O'Hanlon	Hans Rosenfeldt	9 April 2018	4.98
The police arrest Eric for firing his gun at Gail's boss. When questioned, he reveals Gail's breakthrough with Joel, who turns out to be Jane's brother. During a raid at Jane's house, Marcella finds Edward's bag and realises that he has been taken. Having another one of her blackouts, she drives off, picking up Samantha, and eventually confronts Jane in an abandoned winery. After subduing and arresting Jane, Marcella goes back to the hypnotist and recalls that she accidentally killed Juliet. After realising that, she signs the papers giving Jason full custody of the children and hands them to Becky, then makes her way to the roof of the police building. Rav follows her, stops her from jumping, and attempts to convince her to seek help. Marcella knocks him out and changes her appearance before disappearing into the night. Later, Frank, an associate of Laura, tells Marcella that the woman whose DNA Marcella had used to hide her possible involvement in Grace Gibson's murder has perished in a fire, meaning that Marcella is now legally dead. As a result, Frank offers her a job working undercover.

=== Series 3 (2021) ===
This series was released originally on Netflix in June 2020, however, the televised dates were scheduled for Spring 2021.

No. overall	No. in series	Title	Directed by	Written by	Original release date	UK viewers (millions)
17	1	"Episode 1"	Gilles Bannier	Hans Rosenfeldt	26 January 2021	4.31 (Note: 4.207 million TV-only viewers, plus 107,376 across devices (7-day consolidated)) (Note: In 28-day consolidation, 5.32m)
Now working under Frank Young, Marcella finds herself undercover in Belfast as Keira May Devlin, who has been posing as the girlfriend of Lawrence Corrigan, an accountant working for the Maguire crime family. After a dinner at matriarch Katherine's home, son Finn Maguire makes an unexpected move, forcing Marcella into dangerous territory undercover. In a seemingly unrelated matter, Rav Sangha, now a DCI, is called to a London nightclub to investigate the murder of the son of the Foreign Secretary, which was committed by Finn's brother-in-law, Bobby Barrett.
18	2	"Episode 2"	Gilles Bannier	Hans Rosenfeldt	2 February 2021	3.44 (Note: 3.345 million TV-only viewers, plus 98,336 across devices (7-day consolidated))
With Marcella now living in the Maguire family home with Finn, his brother Rory, his sister Stacey and her husband Bobby, along with her mother Katherine, she is caught off guard when she is recognised by someone from her past. Sangha arrives in Belfast to further investigate the murder by tracking down Bobby. Marcella starts to have nightmares after finding a cryptic note. Frank is concerned about Marcella's actions but has confidence in her to succeed in the operation he invested so much in setting up.
19	3	"Episode 3"	Gilles Bannier	David Allison, Emer Gillespie, Paul Waters (Story by Hans Rosenfeldt)	9 February 2021	3.10 (Note: 2.957 million TV-only viewers, plus 141,801 across devices (7-day consolidated))
Frank Young and DCI Sangha meet to discuss taking down the Maguire family. Jack Healy, a fellow inmate of Finn's, is released from prison but immediately must grieve for his daughter. A Maguire family show of public support for Jack brings out Sangha, who spots Marcella. Marcella gets another cryptic message, arousing the suspicion of Katherine and Rory. Sangha chooses to arrest the whole Maguire family household, mystified by Marcella's behaviour. Bobby tries to save face by trying to avenge Jack, forcing Marcella to reach out to Sangha.
20	4	"Episode 4"	Ashley Pearce	Rachel Flowerday, Tim Loane (Story by Hans Rosenfeldt)	16 February 2021	2.85 (Note: 2.687 million TV-only viewers, plus 166,349 across devices (7-day consolidated))
Marcella starts to fight her inner demons in the aftermath of the Danny Armstrong incident. DCI Sangha presses on Bobby, which forces Katherine to take action at the request of her daughter, Stacey. Marcella and Bobby start to fight, but both are surprised when he is taken away by unidentified law enforcement who make him an offer. Katherine gives Marcella a demonstration of her power by having the mayor poisoned and thrown from his own balcony. Jack Healy tries to get the truth about who Keira really is. Marcella arrives at an all too familiar crime scene back at her previous residency.
21	5	"Episode 5"	Ashley Pearce	Mike Walden (Story by Hans Rosenfeldt)	23 February 2021	2.53 (Note: 2.354 million TV-only viewers, plus 180,137 across devices (7-day consolidated))
Frank arrives at Marcella's crime scene to help. Marcella tests a theory that Bobby's abductors may have been ex-cops. Frank's database of cops reveals disturbing results. Marcella tracks down Bobby, running into DCI Sangha on her way to find the abductors. Marcella's interrogation yields some shocking information. Rory holds a family meeting to come clean. Marcella and Finn have a plan to get Stacey on board so as to prevent Rory from ultimately becoming head of the crime family. Frank tells Marcella he has found the stalker giving her the cryptic clues, who turns out to be no stranger.
22	6	"Episode 6"	Ashley Pearce	Matthew Thomas (Story by Hans Rosenfeldt)	2 March 2021	2.79 (Note: 2.608 million TV-only viewers, plus 184,950 across devices (7-day consolidated))
Marcella is thrown aback by who the stalker is, so much so that she crashes her car on her way back to the Maguire home. In a flashback of 18 months prior to the present, Marcella is seen going from her suicidal rage to transforming her new undercover life under Frank Young's guidance. Back in the present, Stacey goes missing, prompting Katherine to ask Marcella to use her detective skills to track her down. Marcella is lured to a meeting by DCI Sangha, who pleads with her to return to her previous life. Stacey and her daughter Katie wait for a flight to escape her family. A desperate Marcella calls Frank to plead for help as her two identities clash inside her mind.
23	7	"Episode 7"	Ashley Pearce	Tim Loane (Story by Hans Rosenfeldt)	9 March 2021	2.56 (Note: 2.373 million TV-only viewers, plus 187,094 across devices (7-day consolidated))
Finn and Rory fight over how to handle Stacey's situation. Finn then makes a proposition to Rory of taking over the family's operations from Katherine. Stacey and Katherine exchange threats. Marcella gets the truth from Frank of why the Maguires were chosen as her undercover assignment. DCI Sangha gets word of Stacey's arrest, figuring out that there must be a mole within the police. Katherine vehemently objects to transferring power of attorney over to Finn before having a stroke. Marcella gives Katherine a demonstration of her power. Keira and Marcella meet. Marcella wakes up in a vehicle by the side of a rural road with no recollection of how she got there.
24	8	"Episode 8"	Ashley Pearce	David Allison (Story by Hans Rosenfeldt)	16 March 2021	2.19 (Note: 1.997 million TV-only viewers, plus 196,789 across devices (7-day consolidated))
Marcella makes a gruesome discovery in the vehicle she woke up in. Stacey refuses to sign over her trust to Finn, prompting him to take drastic measures. Jack Healey breaks into DCI Sangha's hotel room, finding out just who Keira really is. Eddie Lyons chooses to be uncooperative with DCI Sangha, frustrating him, but Finn is required to ensure Eddie stays silent. Jack reveals Keira's true identity to both Rory and Finn, but is surprised at their lack of action. Marcella reaches out to Sangha about the status of her investigation. The Maguire home becomes the stage where Frank Young, Jack, Marcella, Sangha, and the three Maguire siblings all converge toward seeking justice for each of their own personal interests. Jack is stabbed and killed, presumably by Frank, who is shot and killed, presumably by Jack. Stacey shoots Rory; Finn shoots Stacey, and both are left to die. Finn follows Marcella into the gardens; Rav is then shot by Finn who is shot by Marcella. Marcella confronts Katherine, telling her of her plans to take care of baby Katie. Before flying off to an unknown destination on a private plane, Marcella receives a phone call which she chooses not to answer.

== Reception ==
=== Critical response ===
For series one, the review aggregator website Rotten Tomatoes reported a 73% approval rating with an average rating of 6.7/10, based on 15 critic reviews. The website's critics consensus reads, "Buoyed by Anna Friel, Marcella will satisfy any fan of dark crime drama." Metacritic, which uses a weighted average, assigned a score of 65 out of 100 based on 4 critics, indicating "generally favorable reviews ".

For series two, Rotten Tomatoes reported a 57% approval rating with an average rating of 5.3/10, based on 7 critic reviews. The third series has an 80% approval rating based on 5 critic reviews.

== See also ==
- Nordic noir
