= Hayat Kamille =

Iraqi and British actress

- Born: Baghdad, Iraq
- Occupation: Actress
- Years active: 2012–present

Hayat Kamille is an Iraqi and British actress of film, television, and stage. She is best known for playing Mariam in the television drama series Vikings: Valhalla, and The Magician in the horror film Lee Cronin's The Mummy (2026).

== Early life ==
Kamille was born in Baghdad. In 1990 when Kamille was a baby, her family went on holiday to England. Their return flight was cancelled due to the Gulf War so her family had to stay in the country. She grew up in Surrey and went to school there.

== Career ==
After starting off her career in a couple of short films and commercials Kamille made an appearance in an episode of the American political drama series Tyrant. Her first feature length film was the 2016 documentary Letters from Baghdad. She lent her voice to the 2017 games Assassin's Creed Origins Her first big role came playing Mariam in the historial drama series Vikings: Valhalla who was the love interest of the lead character Leif Erikson. She had a lead role in the BBC drama series Wild Cherry (TV series) portraying Maryam. She made appearances in the mystery films Murder on the Orient Express and Death on the Nile directed by Kenneth Branagh. She gained worldwide fame for playing the villainous magician in the horror film Lee Cronin's The Mummy.

== Filmography ==
=== Film ===
| Year | Title | Role | Notes |
|---|---|---|---|
| 2012 | Intel Ultrabook: Egypt | waitress | Short |
| 2013 | Layla | Layla | Short |
| 2014 | 7.2 | lackey two | Short |
| 2016 | Letters from Baghdad | Jamil Zadeh | |
| 2017 | Murder on the Orient Express | Susanne | |
| 2019 | Mosul | Waleed's wife | |
| 2022 | Death on the Nile | snake handler | |
| 2025 | Tea with Friends | Nadia | Short |
| 2026 | Lee Cronin's The Mummy | the magician | |
| 2026 | Green Light | Farida | Short |

=== Television ===
| Year | Title | Role | Notes |
|---|---|---|---|
| 2016 | Tyrant | Liberal Woman 3 | Episode; A Rock and A Hard Place |
| 2019 | Ransom | Rachel Tompkins | Episode; Playing God |
| 2023 | Vikings: Valhalla | Mariam | 7 episodes |
| 2025 | The Good Ship Murder | Layla Mahmood | Episode; Alexandria |
| 2025 | Unforgotten | Nahal Dowari | Episode; Episode #6.6 |
| 2025 | Wild Cherry | Maryam | 6 episodes |

=== Video Games ===
| Year | Title | Role | Notes |
|---|---|---|---|
| 2017 | Assassin's Creed Origins | Womens voice | |
