= Clash (2016 film) =

2016 film

- Film poster
- Directed by: Mohamed Diab
- Written by: Mohamed Diab
- Produced by: Moez Masoud; Mohamed Hefzy; Eric Lagesse
- Starring: Nelly Karim
- Cinematography: Ahmed Gabr
- Music by: Khaled Dagher
- Release dates: 12 May 2016 (Cannes); 27 July 2016 (Egypt)
- Running time: 97 minutes
- Countries: Egypt; France; Germany
- Language: Arabic
- Box office: $143 121

Clash (Arabic: اشتباك) is a 2016 internationally co-produced Arabic-language drama film written and directed by Mohamed Diab. It was officially selected by the 2016 Cannes Film Festival and was the opening film of the Festival's Un Certain Regard section that year. It was selected as the Egyptian entry for the Best Foreign Language Film at the 89th Academy Awards but it was not nominated. It won the award for Best Film at the 2016 International Film Festival of Kerala.

Set just after the political events of June 2013, the film is shot entirely in the confines of a police van containing Muslim Brotherhood members and pro-army supporters, as well as other people belonging to neither of these factions.

== Cast ==
- Nelly Karim
- Hany Adel
- Mohammed Alaa
- Khaled Kamal
- Ali Altayeb
- May Elghety
- Hosni Sheta
- Ahmed Malik
- Mohamed Gamal Kalbaz
- Ashraf Hamdi

== Reception ==
The film has a rating of 93% on Rotten Tomatoes based on 45 reviews.

Deborah Young of The Hollywood Reporter states the film "will be remembered as one of the most telling depictions of modern Egypt yet filmed" and "is an original, often quite disturbing experience to watch".

Jay Weissberg of Variety writes "this is bravura filmmaking with a kick-in-the-gut message about chaos and cruelty (with some humanity)."

Tom Hanks praised the film by saying: "If there's any way you can see CLASH by Egyptian director Mohamed Diab, you must. You simply must. The film will break your heart, but enlighten all."

== See also ==
- List of submissions to the 89th Academy Awards for Best Foreign Language Film
- List of Egyptian submissions for the Academy Award for Best Foreign Language Film
