= Archie Barnes =

English actor

- Born: 2006 (age 19–20)
- Years active: 2016–present
- Mother: Helena Calvert

Archie Oliver G Barnes (born 2006) is an English actor. He began his career as a child actor. His films include The Dig (2021). On television, he is known for his role as Oscar Tully in the HBO series House of the Dragon (2024–).

== Early life ==
The son of actress Helena Calvert and app founder Olly Barnes, Barnes was born prematurely and spent the first five weeks of his life at Guy's Hospital in Southwark, South London. He has two siblings. Barnes attended Royal Russell School in Croydon.

== Career ==
Around the age of 10, Barnes made his professional stage debut in the 2016 production of Bugsy Malone at the Lyric Theatre in Hammersmith. He made his feature film debut in the 2018 comedy Patrick (also known as Patrick the Pug). This was followed by a role in All My Sons at the Old Vic in 2019. He was initially set to voice Pantalaimon in the BBC series His Dark Materials but withdrew; the role was taken over by Kit Connor.

Barnes returned to film and gained prominence through his portrayal of Robert Pretty, son of Edith Pretty (Carey Mulligan), in the biographical drama The Dig, released on Netflix in 2021. He also had a small role in The Batman.

In 2023, Barnes made his television debut as Matthew Stonehouse in the 2023 ITV comedy-drama Stonehouse starring Matthew Macfadyen and Keeley Hawes and appeared in Phaedra at the National Theatre, which was nominated for a Laurence Olivier Award. The following year, Barnes joined the cast of the HBO fantasy series House of the Dragon, a Game of Thrones prequel, for its second season as Oscar Tully, who becomes Lord of Riverrun and Lord Paramount of the Riverlands at a young age.

== Filmography ==
Year	Title	Role	Notes
2018	Patrick	Zachary	Film; also known as Patrick the Pug
2021	The Dig	Robert Pretty	Film
2022	The Batman	Mitchell's son	Film
2023	Stonehouse	Matthew Stonehouse	TV miniseries, 3 episodes
2024	Dune: Prophecy	Albert Atreides	TV series; episode: "Sisterhood Above All"
2024–present	House of the Dragon	Oscar Tully	TV series; recurring role; 8 episodes
2025	Wild Cherry	Arthur Lonsdale	TV series; recurring role
2026	The 'Burbs	Young Robert	TV series; episode: "The Old Face-to-Face"

== Stage ==
Year	Title	Role	Notes
2016	Bugsy Malone	Dandy Dan	Lyric Theatre, Hammersmith
2019	All My Sons	Bert	Old Vic, London
2023	Phaedra	Declan	National Theatre, London
