= Imogen Faires =

English actress

- Born: 12 January 2002 (age 24); London Borough of Newham
- Years active: 2012–present

Imogen Catherine M. Faires (born 2002) is an English actress and poet. She began her career as a child actress on the West End, and in the BBC One drama Dickensian (2015–2016) and the ITV series Marcella (2016–2018). She has since appeared in the BBC One series Wild Cherry (2025).

== Early life and education ==
Faires was born in the London Borough of Newham. Faires is Catholic and attended St Edward's Catholic Primary School in Upton Park. She completed sixth form at the BRIT School. She took classes at the Step Up Music Theatre School and joined the DMA Foundation.

== Career ==
Around age nine or ten, Faires made her West End debut as Young Nala in The Lion King. She also modeled for Boden and Adidas. In 2015, Faires made her television debut with guest appearances in episodes of the BBC Three sitcom Uncle and the CBBC series The Dumping Ground. That year, she landed her first major role as Nell Trent in the BBC One drama Dickensian. The following year, Faires began playing Emma Buckland in the ITV detective noir series Marcella. She also had guest roles in the sitcom So Awkward and the anthology series Creeped Out, both on CBBC.

After completing sixth form in 2020, Faires returned to television with a lead role as the titular character of the Nickelodeon UK series Goldie's Oldies in 2021. That same year, she voiced Young Mel Medarda in the animated series Arcane.

Faires appeared in a 2024 episode of the BBC One medical soap opera Casualty. She appeared in the BBC One series Wild Cherry in November 2025.

== Filmography ==
=== Television ===
| Year | Title | Role | Notes |
|---|---|---|---|
| 2015 | Uncle | Willow | 1 episode |
| 2015 | The Dumping Ground | Chanelle | Episode: "Goodbye Girl" |
| 2015–2016 | Dickensian | Nell Trent | 11 episodes |
| 2016–2018 | Marcella | Emma Backland | 11 episodes |
| 2016 | So Awkward | Scarlet | Episode: "Totes Emosh" |
| 2019 | Creeped Out | Kiera | Episode: "No Filter" |
| 2021 | Goldie's Oldies | Goldie Glickman-Park | Lead role |
| 2021 | Arcane | Young Mel Medarda | Voice role, episode: "Oil and Water" |
| 2024 | Casualty | Tilly Matthews | Episode: "System Failure" |
| 2025 | Wild Cherry | Grace | Main role |

== Stage ==
| Year | Title | Role | Notes |
|---|---|---|---|
| 2012 | The Lion King | Young Nala | Lyceum Theatre, London |
