= Evil Dead Rise =

2023 film by Lee Cronin

- Theatrical release poster
- Directed by: Lee Cronin
- Written by: Lee Cronin
- Based on: Characters by Sam Raimi
- Produced by: Rob Tapert
- Starring: Lily Sullivan; Alyssa Sutherland; Morgan Davies; Gabrielle Echols; Nell Fisher
- Cinematography: Dave Garbett
- Edited by: Bryan Shaw
- Music by: Stephen McKeon
- Production companies: New Line Cinema; Renaissance Pictures (Note: Promotional material alternatively use the Ghost House Pictures logo.); Pacific Renaissance; Wild Atlantic Pictures
- Distributed by: Warner Bros. Pictures
- Release dates: March 15, 2023 (SXSW); April 21, 2023 (United States)
- Running time: 96 minutes
- Countries: New Zealand; Ireland; United States
- Language: English
- Budget: $15–19 million
- Box office: $147 million

Evil Dead Rise is a 2023 supernatural horror film written and directed by Lee Cronin. It is the fifth installment of the Evil Dead film series, following Evil Dead (2013). The film stars Lily Sullivan and Alyssa Sutherland as two estranged sisters trying to survive and save their family from Deadites. Morgan Davies, Gabrielle Echols, and Nell Fisher (in her film debut) appear in supporting roles. The film is an international co-production between New Zealand, Ireland and the United States.

The film's development was preceded by scrapped plans for direct sequels to Evil Dead (2013) and Army of Darkness (1992), and a fourth season of Ash vs Evil Dead (2015–2018). By October 2019, Sam Raimi announced that a new film was in development, with Rob Tapert producing, Raimi and Bruce Campbell executive producing, and Cronin writing and directing the project. New Line Cinema, the first film's distributor, was announced as a production company involved. Principal photography took place in New Zealand from June to October 2021. Initially set to premiere on the streaming service HBO Max, distributor Warner Bros. Pictures opted to release Evil Dead Rise theatrically after positive test screenings.

Evil Dead Rise premiered at South by Southwest on March 15, 2023, and released in the United States on April 21 by Warner Bros. Pictures. The film received positive reviews from critics and grossed $147 million worldwide, becoming the highest-grossing film of the series. At the 51st Saturn Awards, it was nominated for Best Horror Film and Best Make-up. A sixth installment, titled Evil Dead Burn, was released on July 10, 2026.

== Plot ==
Cousins Teresa and Jessica, and Jessica's boyfriend Caleb, are vacationing at a lakeside cabin when a possessed Jessica scalps Teresa and decapitates Caleb before levitating above the lake.

One day earlier, guitar technician Beth discovers she is pregnant and turns to her estranged sister, Ellie Bixler, for help. Ellie informs Beth that her husband has left the family, leaving her to take care of her three kids – Danny, Bridget, and Kassie – alone in their L.A. apartment. After the siblings return from dinner, an intense earthquake uncovers a hidden chamber beneath the parking lot. Danny investigates, discovering religious artifacts, three phonograph records from 1923, and a strange book that he takes up to his room, hoping to sell it to help Ellie. The initial record details a priest's unsuccessful attempts to research the book, which was revealed to be one of three volumes of the Naturom Demonto (Necronomicon Ex-Mortis/Book of the Dead). The subsequent record reveals that the priest continued his research in secret and recited an incantation that summoned demonic entities known as Deadites.

The building's power fails, and an unseen force possesses Ellie. She returns to the apartment in a trance, menacingly threatens her family, and dies after pleading with Beth to protect her children. Ellie's neighbors help lay her to rest in her bedroom and search for a way out. They find that the staircase has collapsed, the elevator is damaged, and they are unable to access the fire escape before Ellie revives and attacks the family, wounding Beth and Bridget. Beth and the children lock Ellie outside the apartment after she pursues and massacres the neighbors.

Danny confesses to Beth his recovery of the Naturom Demonto, and Ellie tricks Kassie into unlocking the door before attacking her. While Danny and Beth are distracted rescuing Kassie and locking Ellie out, Bridget's wound festers, and she is possessed. Bridget attacks Beth before turning on Danny and Kassie, with the latter inadvertently impaling her through the mouth with a broken broom handle.

Beth listens to the third record to learn how to exorcise the Deadites, but discovers the priest failed and his allies were all possessed, and that only the complete destruction of the host stopped the Deadites. Bridget revives and fatally stabs Danny, who sets Bridget on fire before dying as Ellie infiltrates the apartment using the vents. Realizing Beth is pregnant, Ellie attempts to rip the fetus out of her, but Beth and Kassie incapacitate her with scissors. Ellie fails to emotionally manipulate Kassie, who accepts the fact that her mother is gone.

Danny and the bodies of the neighbors are all possessed, leading Beth and Kassie to take shelter in the damaged elevator. Ellie, Bridget and Danny then all merge into a multi-limbed creature known as the Marauder and climb atop the elevator to attack the pair as the elevator fills with blood. The combined weight causes the elevator to plummet to the ground floor, allowing Beth and Kassie to flee into the parking lot. The Marauder captures Kassie and attempts to behead her with a chainsaw, but Beth returns and distracts it. She and Kassie destroy the Marauder's body by forcing it into a wood chipper. Ellie's severed head taunts Beth, saying she will fail as a mother, prompting her to kick Ellie's head into the chipper. Beth and Kassie escape the building together.

The next morning, Jessica heads to the parking lot to leave for her vacation when she is attacked by an unseen force.

== Cast ==
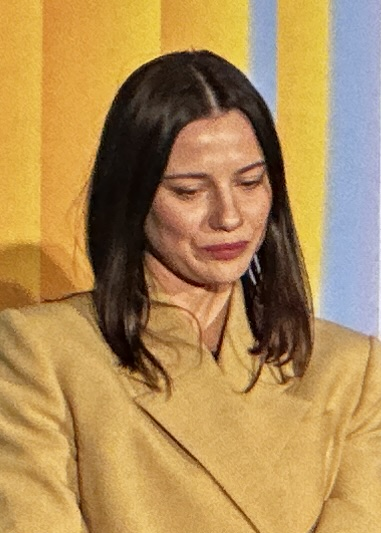
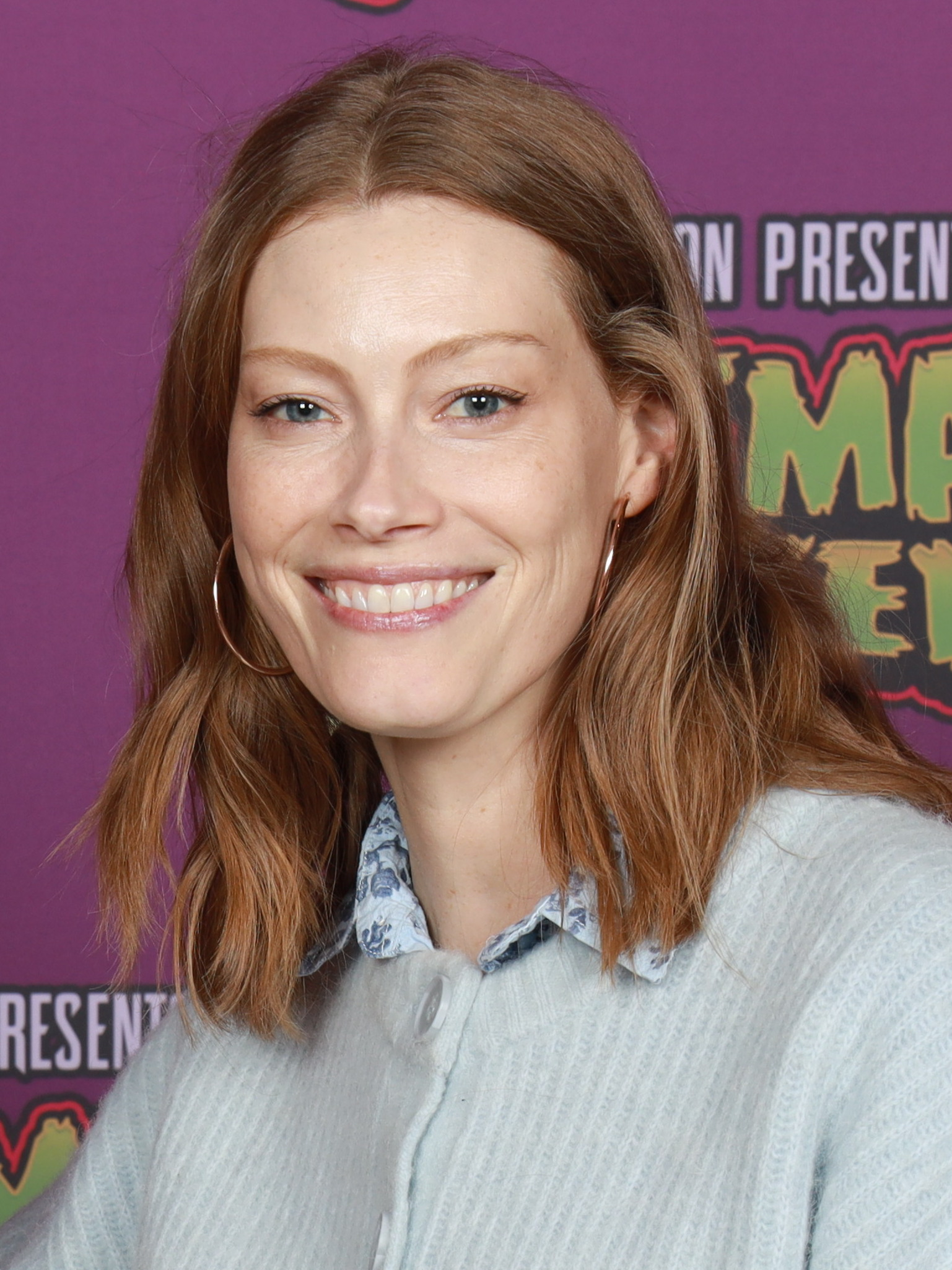
Lead actresses Lily Sullivan and Alyssa Sutherland
- Lily Sullivan as Beth
- Alyssa Sutherland as Ellie
- Morgan Davies as Danny
- Gabrielle Echols as Bridget
- Nell Fisher as Kassie
- Noah Paul as Bruce
- Richard Crouchley as Caleb
- Mirabai Pease as Teresa
- Anna-Maree Thomas as Jessica
- Jayden Daniels as Gabriel
- Billy Reynolds-McCarthy as Jake
- Tai Wano as Scott
- Mark Mitchinson as Mr. Fonda
  - Mitchinson also voices Father Marcus Littleton, heard in a recording on one of the phonograph records from 1923.

Bruce Campbell is featured in an uncredited voice-only cameo role heard in a recording on one of the phonograph records from 1923; Campbell voices an unnamed character who forewarns the priests of the dangers of the demon resurrection ritual, and demands they destroy the book. Writer-director Cronin stated that he had Campbell voice this role intentionally, stating that he considers it to be a time-displaced Ash Williams.

== Production ==
=== Development ===
At the film's South by Southwest (SXSW) premiere, Fede Álvarez announced that his film Evil Dead (2013), a remake of The Evil Dead (1981), would be getting a sequel. In addition, Sam Raimi confirmed plans to write Evil Dead 4 with his brother Ivan Raimi; it was later specified that the film would be a sequel to Army of Darkness (1992). At a WonderCon panel in March 2013, Bruce Campbell and Álvarez stated that their ultimate plan was for Álvarez's Evil Dead 2 and Raimi's Army of Darkness 2 to be followed by a seventh film which would merge the narratives of Ash Williams and Mia Allen. Campbell confirmed that he would reprise his role as Ash in Army of Darkness 2. Álvarez later that month tweeted to his followers that Raimi would serve as director on Army of Darkness 2. By November, Campbell expressed doubts in a fourth Evil Dead film, with Raimi's Army of Darkness 2 ultimately being redeveloped as a sequel television series, Ash vs Evil Dead, starring Campbell and airing on Starz from October 31, 2015, to April 29, 2018.

Following the cancellation of a fourth season of Ash vs Evil Dead in April 2019, that November, speaking on the future of the Evil Dead franchise, Álvarez announced that "They're just ideas right now. Nothing to announce officially. We do have a script for Don't Breathe 2. That's the only difference. We don't have a script for Evil Dead 2. But we do have a script for Don't Breathe 2 that we wrote." He also said that "When I tweeted that I was interested in seeing what people prefer. We were having some internal debates about what people would be interested in most. Unfortunately, Evil Dead 2 won. Which, I guess I would have preferred Don't Breathe 2 to win because it's one of my own creations. Obviously Evil Dead has the bigger following." In July 2019, Raimi discussed the future of the Evil Dead franchise, saying that "We'd like to make another Evil Dead feature [film] and in fact we're working on some ideas right now." Raimi said that he would be interested in making another film with Campbell; however, Campbell earlier claimed that he had retired from the role of Ash. He said another option would be a sequel to the 2013 reboot, but was unsure if Álvarez would want to make a sequel at this point because the director is a successful "artist in demand" now. Despite this, Campbell would appear in the film in a "teeny, tiny, little cameo" as a character identified by the film's writer-director Lee Cronin as a time-displaced Ash Williams.

=== Pre-production ===
In October 2019, Raimi announced at New York Comic Con that a new Evil Dead film was in development. Robert G. Tapert was set to produce, while Raimi and Campbell served as executive producers only, all under their Ghost House Pictures banner. In June 2020, Campbell revealed that Lee Cronin was handpicked by Raimi to write and direct the film, then titled Evil Dead Now, after Cronin previously collaborated with Raimi on the horror streaming series 50 States of Fright. In May 2021, New Line Cinema (who distributed the first film) had picked up the film, with it scheduled to be released on HBO Max and retitled Evil Dead Rise.

=== Casting ===
In May 2021, it was reported that Australian actresses Alyssa Sutherland and Lily Sullivan had been cast in the lead roles. In June 2021, Gabrielle Echols, Morgan Davies, and Nell Fisher were added to the cast. In July 2021, Mia Challis was reported to have joined the cast.

=== Filming ===
I'm proud of the fact that we were literally able to create an imaginary building and take people for a ride, when I think about what actually existed before we started this film and what we ended up with. Everything being a set meant we were able to control everything.

— Production designer Nick Bassett.

Principal photography began in New Zealand on June 6, 2021, with Dave Garbett serving as cinematographer. Garbett previously served as a cinematographer on several episodes of Ash vs Evil Dead, as well as production designer Nick Bassett. Interior settings, including the inside of the apartment building, the parking garage, and the underground bank vault, were constructed sets in a rented warehouse space in Mount Wellington. The opening sequence at the cabin and lake was shot on private property outside of Auckland; the exterior of the cabin, which was only a façade, was built on location, while the cabin's interior was built in the warehouse in Mount Wellington. On July 14, 2021, Cronin revealed that filming was officially halfway done. Filming officially wrapped on October 27, 2021.

Cronin stated the film used over 6,500 liters (1,717 U.S. gallons) of fake blood. The fake blood is a mixture of food-based dyes, high fructose corn syrup, and water, a recipe used by special effects supervisor Brendon Durey. Due to the amount of fake blood needed, a commercial food manufacturer was hired to produce the substance, and large bulk shipping containers were used to transport and store it. As with past installments in the series, the film relied more heavily on practical effects than computer-generated imagery. The bathroom in Beth's apartment was built on hydraulics to allow the set to shake. The apartment elevator was built in a steel frame that allowed it to be lifted or dropped; it was outfitted with removable wooden paneling that was treated to avoid being stained by fake blood.

The scene in which the elevator fills with blood was accomplished by lowering the constructed elevator into a 6,000 L (1,585 U.S. gal) tank of fake blood using a forklift. The following shot, an homage to the 1980 film The Shining in which blood pours out from the elevator into the building's lobby, took place on a full-size set made partly from plywood. Two large "dump tanks" attached to a ramp allowed the amount of liquid to pour out from the elevator doors at the desired speed. The special effects team ran rehearsals of the sequence using stunt performers and water. The scene was shot in two takes—once for the wide shots and once for close-ups of the actors—using a multicamera setup. Cronin stated, "The cleanup would take about eight hours, and so if we didn't get it the first time, we would clean up and then shoot it again at the end of the day. But we got it in the first pass."

=== Post-production ===
The editing of the film's visual components took over six months to complete, in an editing suite in Cronin's hometown of Dublin. In March 2022, Cronin tweeted that the picture editing process had been completed, writing: "Onto music composition and sound design we go." Myk Farmer serves as the film's sound mixer. The negative pickup cost was $19 million.

Along with his voice cameo on the phonograph record, Bruce Campbell also contributed foley to the film, with Cronin stating, "There's a scene around an eye where there's some munching, and Bruce created that sound by eating an apple furiously for me".

== Music ==
In April 2022, Stephen McKeon was announced to be composing the score, after collaborating with Cronin on The Hole in the Ground (2019).

Track listing
| No. | Title | Length |
|---|---|---|
| 1. | "Main Titles (Evil Dead Rise)" | 1:04 |
| 2. | "Meat Puppet" | 1:47 |
| 3. | "Swimming Headless" | 1:31 |
| 4. | "Los Diablos" | 1:07 |
| 5. | "Underground Carpark" | 1:29 |
| 6. | "The Vault" | 2:24 |
| 7. | "Christ's Head" | 1:23 |
| 8. | "Opening the Book of the Dead" | 2:13 |
| 9. | "Incantation" | 4:16 |
| 10. | "Pulled Apart" | 1:53 |
| 11. | "Mommy's Home" | 5:38 |
| 12. | "Eeny Meeny Miney DIE!" | 8:17 |
| 13. | "Psycho Bitch" | 2:30 |
| 14. | "Say Cheese!" | 9:21 |
| 15. | "Beth and Kassie" | 2:57 |
| 16. | "Burning Your Bridget" | 5:18 |
| 17. | "Dead by Dawn" | 9:26 |
| 18. | "Final Confrontation" | 7:39 |
| 19. | "Two Souls" | 1:35 |
| 20. | "Another Meat Puppet" | 1:06 |
| Total length: | | 72:54 |

== Release ==
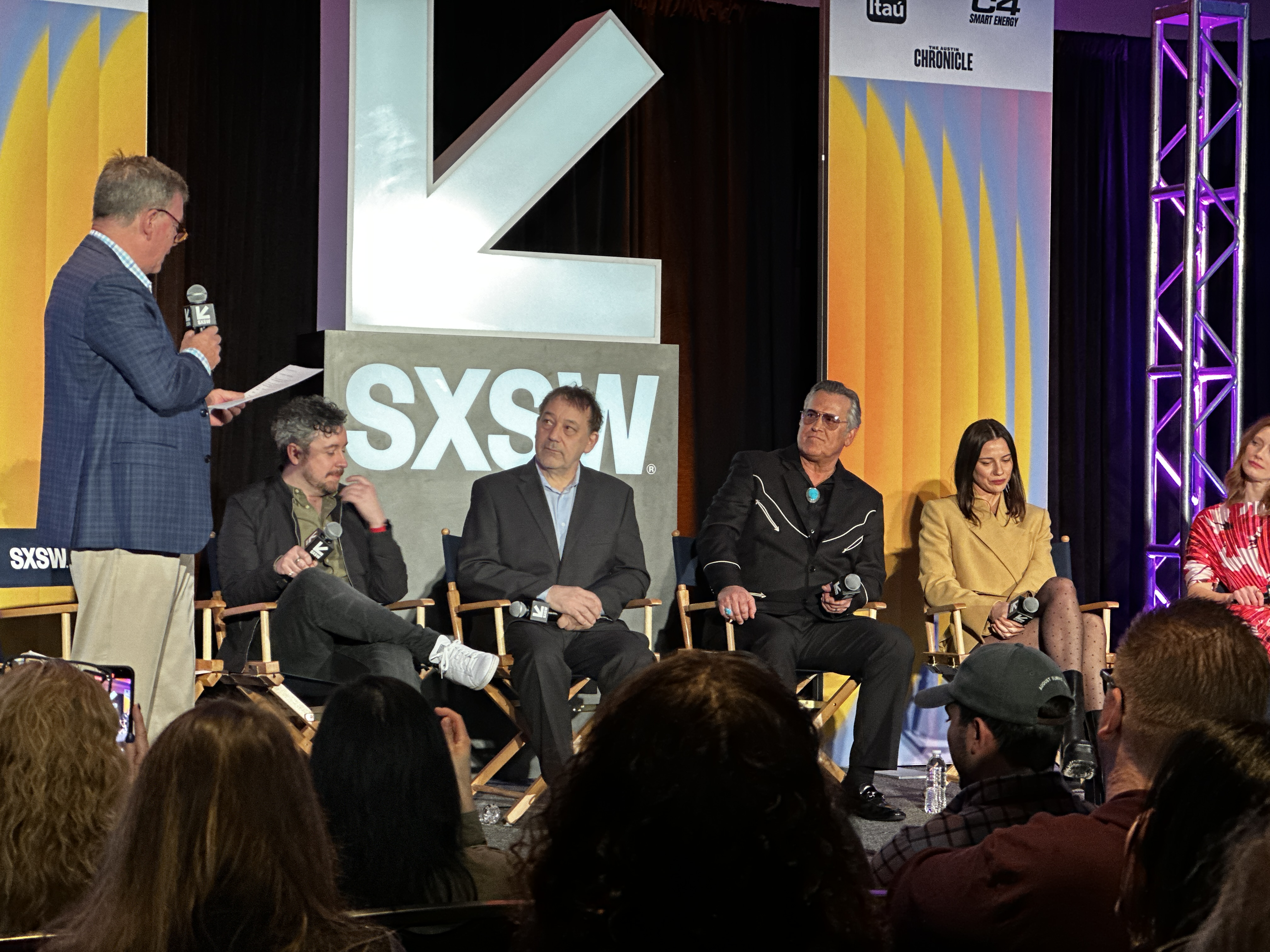
The cast and crew promoting the film at a panel during 2023 South by Southwest Film & TV Festival.

The film was originally set for a streaming-only release on HBO Max, but was switched to a theatrical release in August 2022 because of positive test screenings and the restructuring plan for film distribution at Warner Bros. Pictures that would see the studio relying less on HBO Max-only releases and more on theatrical releases. The film was theatrically released in the United States on April 21, 2023, by Warner Bros.

Evil Dead Rise had its world premiere at 2023 South by Southwest Film & TV Festival on March 15, 2023. It also had midnight screenings at Fantastic Film Festival Australia, simultaneously in Sydney and Melbourne, on April 20.

=== Home media ===
Evil Dead Rise was released digitally on May 9, 2023, and on DVD, Blu-ray and Ultra HD Blu-ray on June 27. The film was available to stream on Max beginning June 23. Warner Bros. collaborated with Best Buy on an exclusive special edition Ultra HD Blu-ray steelbook released on October 3. The release includes an audio commentary track by Cronin, Sullivan and Sutherland, as well as the featurette Raising a New Evil Dead. Arrow Films further released a specialty 4K Ultra HD Blu-ray edition in January 2026; this release includes all special features available on the steelbook in addition to eight new interviews with cast and crew members, Cronin's 2013 short film Ghost Train, and The Sound of Evil Dead Rise, a 2023 interview from the Dolby Institute Podcast with director Lee Cronin and sound designer Peter Albrechtsen.

== Reception ==
=== Box office ===
Evil Dead Rise grossed $67.2 million in the United States and Canada, and $79.8 million in other territories, for a worldwide total of $147 million. Deadline Hollywood calculated the net profit of the film to be $46 million, when factoring together all expenses and revenues.

In the United States and Canada, Evil Dead Rise was released alongside The Covenant, Chevalier, and the wide expansion of Beau Is Afraid, and was projected to gross $15–20 million from 3,402 theaters in its opening weekend. The film made $10.3 million on its first day, including $2.5 million from Thursday night previews. It went on to debut to $24.5 million, slightly beating expectations and finishing second behind holdover The Super Mario Bros. Movie. A total of 58% of the audience was male, with 66% being between the ages of 18 and 35. The film made $12.2 million in its second weekend, remaining in second place, and then $5.9 million in its third, finishing in third behind Guardians of the Galaxy Vol. 3 and Super Mario.

Outside of the US and Canada, the film grossed $17.9 million from 58 markets in its opening weekend. The top markets were Mexico ($1.9 million), United Kingdom ($1.8 million), Brazil ($1.5 million) and France and India $3.2 million (equivalent to INR 26.1 crores).

=== Critical response ===
On the review aggregator website Rotten Tomatoes, 85% of 241 critics' reviews are positive. The website's consensus reads: "Offering just about everything longtime fans could hope for while still managing to carry the franchise forward, Evil Dead Rise is all kinds of groovy." Metacritic, which uses a weighted average, assigned the film a score of 69 out of 100, based on 38 critics, indicating "generally favorable" reviews. Audiences surveyed by CinemaScore gave the film an average grade of "B" on an A+ to F scale, while those polled by PostTrak gave it a 71% positive score, with 57% saying they would definitely recommend it.

=== Accolades ===
Evil Dead Rise was nominated in three categories at the 2023 Golden Trailer Awards: the film itself for Best Horror, and "You" (Buddha Jones) and "Free" (Level Up AV) for Best Horror TV Spot (for a Feature Film). It won the latter category for "Click Review" (MOCEAN). The film became a runner-up for Best Horror at the 6th Hollywood Critics Association Midseason Film Awards. At the 51st Saturn Awards, the film received two nominations for Best Horror Film and Best Make-up. Sutherland was nominated for Best Actress in a Horror Movie and Best Villain in a Movie, while the film was nominated for Best Horror Movie at the 4th Critics' Choice Super Awards.

== Franchise ==
=== Sequel ===
In April 2023, Bruce Campbell stated that he, Sam, and Ivan Raimi were planning a possibility for future films in the franchise "every two or three years" if Evil Dead Rise is a success, stating:

"I think the stories will progress a little more now. We're going to try and do them more like every two or three years rather than every 10 years. It's also the first time Sam is working with his brother Ivan to create an overall Bible that will give future writers and directors an idea of where this thing should go next to potentially tie in some of these stories. So, I think it's going to get a little more tied in as the years go by. But because it's all about the books. It could be a book in the past, a book in the future. It's yet to be determined."

Director Cronin also discussed his ideas for future sequels in the series taking place after Evil Dead Rise.

=== Prequel ===
In February 2024, it was reported that Sébastien Vaniček would direct and co-write a new spin-off film of the Evil Dead franchise, while in April 2024, it was announced that another Evil Dead film was in development with Ghost House Pictures producing. Francis Galluppi would serve as writer and director, as selected by Raimi. Vaniček's Evil Dead Burn was released on July 10, 2026. Galluppi's Evil Dead Wrath is scheduled to be released on April 7, 2028.
