= Creeped Out =

2017 anthology horror series

- Genre: Children's; Horror; Science fiction; Fantasy
- Created by: Bede Blake; Robert Butler
- Written by: Bede Blake; Robert Butler; Patrick Whistler; Emma Campbell
- Directed by: Bruce McDonald; Simon Hynd; Gareth Tunley; Lucy Campbell; Steve Hughes
- Narrated by: Aurora (Series 1); Hedvig Becke (Series 2)
- Composer: Joe Kraemer
- Countries of origin: United Kingdom; Canada
- Original language: English
- No. of series: 2
- No. of episodes: 23

Production
- Executive producers: Helen Bullough; Josh Scherba; Ace Fipke; Anne Loi; Bede Blake; Robert Butler
- Producers: Juliet Charlesworth; Angela Boudreault
- Running time: 25 minutes
- Production companies: CBBC Productions (Series 1); BBC Children's Productions (Series 2); DHX Media

Original release
- Network: CBBC (United Kingdom); Family Channel and Family Chrgd (Canada)
- Release: 31 October 2017 – 4 October 2019

Creeped Out is an anthology horror television series created by Bede Blake and Robert Butler as a co-production between CBBC Productions and DHX Media. It premiered in the United Kingdom on CBBC on 31 October 2017 (Halloween), and in Canada on the Family Channel on 5 October 2018. In the United States, the show was released as a Netflix original series.

Each episode has an individual story and all are linked together by 'The Curious', a mysterious story collector who appears at the beginning and end of each episode. According to the creators Bede Blake and Robert Butler, inspiration was drawn from Steven Spielberg and Amazing Stories in particular.

== Format ==
Creeped Out is an anthology, with each episode featuring a new setting, story and new characters, although some details connect the stories. This concept is quite similar to the American television show "Amazing Stories", in the sense that in almost every episode, major details will shift and change. Each episode begins and ends with an appearance from The Curious (played by William Romain), a mysterious child whose face is always concealed by a mask. His self-stated purpose is to be a collector of stories. The setting of Karter Bay appears in the episodes "Slapstick" and "The Call", and Zucco's Pizzeria is mentioned in "Trolled", "No Filter", "Marti" and "Kindlesticks".

Talking about The Curious, co-creator Bede Blake said: "It's designed to be an evolving urban legend. You don't know what's under that mask... Story-wise, he's not a threat to the children. He has his name because he is naturally curious. He's not somebody out to do harm. He's an observer."

== Production ==
Creeped Out was first announced by the BBC on 28 March 2017, saying "the stories combine sci-fi, horror, adventure, suspense, fantasy and mystery to thrill young viewers."

Talking about the show for a Den of Geek interview, co-creator Robert Butler said that both CBBC and DHX gave the creators a long leash and "freedom to pitch whatever the hell we liked," but also provided buffers and steering when required.

According to Syfy Wire, this was a great plan, and said Blake and Butler's plan was to make Amazing Stories mixed in with The Twilight Zone, but aimed at a younger, modernized audience.

After the airing of "The Call", "Creeped Out" took a month-long hiatus. The first episode airing after the hiatus was "Bravery Badge".

On 9 August 2018, it was announced that "Creeped Out" had been commissioned for a second series by two channels, CBBC and Family Channel. The second series was released on 24 April 2019.

== Episodes ==
=== Series overview ===
Series	Episodes	Originally released	
Series	Episodes	First released	Last released
1	13	31 October 2017	20 February 2018
2	10	24 April 2019	4 October 2019

=== Series 1 (2017–18) ===
No. overall	No. in season	Title	Directed by	Written by	Original release date
1	1	"Slapstick"	Steve Hughes	Robert Butler	31 October 2017
Jessie is constantly embarrassed by her parents' behaviour. She comes across a puppet show on the beach and tells the puppet everything, with unexpected consequences: the next morning, Jessie's parents are transformed into living puppets. But she quickly realizes how much she misses her real mum and dad and must try to change them back. Cast: Sydney Wade, Daniel Ryan, Jennifer James, Robert Styles, Caitlan Barret-Ward, Stephanie Dooley, Noah Valentine and Simon Naylor. Filmed in New Brighton, The Wirral
2	2	"Cat Food"	Steve Hughes	Bede Blake & Robert Butler	7 November 2017
Stu cheats his mum into getting a day off sick from school – but he finds out the hard way what the creepy old lady in the house across the road is up to. Cast: Rhys Gannon, Maeve Larkin, Katie Rose Proctor and Margaret Jackman
3	3	"Trolled"	Steve Hughes	Bede Blake	14 November 2017
When Sam starts posting cruel messages anonymously on the school social media site about his friends, he soon understands the true meaning of being a troll. Cast: Jonathan Blake, Maximus Evans, Anya Lawrence, Rachel McGuinness, Phil Corbitt, Andrew Readman and Marcus Taylor
4	4	"Marti"	Bruce McDonald	Bede Blake & Robert Butler	21 November 2017
Kim is unpopular in school, and is desperate to change this. The arrival of her new mobile phone gives her a helping hand, but soon everything starts to unravel. Is it a glitch in the technology or something stranger? Cast: Tiffany Elefano, Diya Kittur, Berkley Silverman, Sam Ashe Arnold, Steven Cooke and Helene Robbie
5	5	"A Boy Called Red"	Steve Hughes	Bede Blake & Robert Butler	28 November 2017
Vincent and his father go to stay in his father’s old family home with his Aunt Jean, after Vincent’s father and mother have separated, but as he checks out the house he finds there is something unexplained lurking in the cellar. Cast: Malen Clarkson, Jason Done, Rosina Carbone, Boris Burnell-Anderson and Macey Howarth
6	6	"The Call"	Steve Hughes	Bede Blake & Robert Butler	5 December 2017
As socially awkward Pearl is about to turn 15, she begins receiving a mysterious call in her mind that draws her to the sea, she embarks on a journey of discovery that she may come to regret. Cast: Rebecca Hanssen, William Haresceugh, Chris Jack, Zita Sattar and Acushla-Tara Kupe. Partly filmed in New Brighton, The Wirral
7	7	"Bravery Badge"	Steve Hughes	Bede Blake & Robert Butler	9 January 2018
On a girl scout trip in a wood, Dent really wishes she could call a cab home. Having been forced to join by her mother, she is paired up with enthusiastic Janie, but the girls do not get along. However, when their friend Arlene gets lost, the troop needs to work together to find her. However, something strange and creepy is lurking in the woods, and it’s after the troop. Cast: Tillie Amartey, Isabella Pinto, Bella Band, Lola Ogunyemi and Elizabeth Bower
8	8	"Spaceman"	Steve Hughes	Bede Blake & Robert Butler	16 January 2018
Spud and Thomas go for a ramble through the woods looking for a den, and find much more than they bargained for. Cast: William Romain, Amelia Curtis, Gianluca Gallucci and Jacob Henshaw
9	9	"Kindlesticks"	Bruce McDonald	Bede Blake & Robert Butler	23 January 2018
Esme, the 'world's worst babysitter', tells scary stories to her clients children, which makes them go to bed early. She uses her boyfriend to help her with this, but when the spoiled child she is looking after doesn’t fall for her usual plan, she finds herself outfoxed. Cast: Romy Weltman, Justin Kelly, Jesse Adam Lowell, Beatriz Yuste, Robin Archer, Andrea Grant, Aliya Anthony, Aria Anthony and Gracie Mchendry
10	10	"Shed No Fear"	Bruce McDonald	Denis McGrath	30 January 2018
Greg has a hunch all is not well with his former friend Dave. When he follows him to his aunt's shed, the adventure is only just beginning Cast: Jordan Poole, Thamela Mpumlwana, Jake Sim, Darlene Cooke, Andrew Moodie and Jaiden Cannatelli
11	11	"The Traveller"	Steve Hughes	Bede Blake & Robert Butler	6 February 2018
Jodie and Brandon find themselves stuck in between times – and they are not alone. Cast: Leah Choudhry, Daniel Ogbeide-John and Andonis Anthony
12	12	"Side Show Part 1"	Bruce McDonald	Bede Blake & Robert Butler	13 February 2018
Ace is an amazing aromaologist in an old fashion circus, but how exactly did he get there and where does he really belong?
13	13	"Side Show Part 2"	Bruce McDonald	Bede Blake and Robert Butler	20 February 2018
As Ace starts to make sense of his few memories of his past, a plan comes together to get him home, but plans don't always go to plan.

=== Series 2 (2019) ===
No. overall	No. in season	Title	Directed by	Written by	Original release date
14	1	"The Unfortunate Five"	Bruce McDonald	Emma Campbell	22 May 2019
The ‘unfortunate five,’ consisting of head-strong Jude, shy Willow, smart Stan, funny Feng and popular Mayel are stuck in detention on the weekend. Though instead of punishment, they get mindfulness exercises. But by the time they piece everything together, will it be too late? Cast: Brielle Robillard, Olivia Presti and Morgan Kohan
15	2	"Only Child"	Bruce McDonald	Bede Blake, Robert Butler & Christina Ray	13 September 2019
When Mia's baby brother comes home from the hospital, strange things begin to happen around the house, and Mia gets all the blame.
16	3	"The Takedown"	Bruce McDonald	Emma Campbell	20 September 2019
Alexa, the only girl on her high school’s wrestling team, wants to be able to beat her opponents in the ring, however feels as if she is not strong enough to take them down. When a mysterious identity called “iAmTrUdI” begins promising Alexa a “gift” in order to win, Alexa becomes invincible and begins to win, unaware that the “gift” she has taken comes from others.
17	4	"Help"	Bruce McDonald	Robert Butler	8 May 2019
Artificial intelligence can be helpful around the house. But does it have access to too much information? What if it knows everything about your family? What if you’ve unknowingly given it – total control.
18	5	"One More Minute"	Bruce McDonald	Patrick Whistler	24 April 2019
Jack loves to play video games. But when he starts playing with a mysterious new kid online, he starts to notice gaps in his memory. He wakes up not knowing how long he has spent at a game. Where did the time go and how much worse can this get in Jack's eye? Cast: Tomaso Sanelli, Ethan Pugiotto and Alexandra Castillo
19	6	"Splinta Claws"	Gareth Tunley	Bede Blake	4 October 2019
Two boys get locked in a department store overnight at Christmas. Cast: Taighen O'Callaghan, Tommy French and Dominique Moore
20	7	"Itchy"	Gareth Tunley	Robert Butler	1 May 2019
Gabe is not known for his bravery. He’s never been the hero. But when head lice begin to infest his small town and everyone is in a panic, he may be the only person who can stop it.
21	8	"No Filter"	Simon Hynd	Robert Butler	6 September 2019
A vain girl named Kiera is obsessed with selfies. With the hope of taking the perfect selfie, she downloads a new app that promises to take the best photos ever. The app proves to take marvellous photos and Kiera loves the app, but soon she discovers that the app also has a scary side effect. Cast: Shanice Archer, Imogen Faires and Doña Croll
22	9	"Tilly Bone"	Simon Hynd	Bede Blake	27 September 2019
Told in reverse, a mysterious new friend helps a teenage vlogger named Cass exact supernatural revenge on her friends who have played a bad joke on her at her birthday sleepover. Cast: Lola Mae Loughran, Ella Dunlop and James Day
23	10	"The Many Place"	Lucy Campbell	Bede Blake	15 May 2019
Three siblings, on a rainy vacation in Australia, are stuck killing time in a hotel. But the more they explore, the more questions they have. Where does one hallway end and another begin? And what lies behind that next door?

== Reception ==
=== Critical response ===
The popular television magazine "TVTimes" gave the series four stars, comparing it to Tales of the Unexpected, and called it a "series of eerie and mysterious stories, ending with a moral."

Chris Bennion for The Times said, "the stories are pleasingly macabre and inventive." Den of Geek called the series "unmissable" and "brilliantly chilling."

=== Accolades ===
Creeped Out won a BAFTA for Best Drama at the Children’s BAFTAS 2019. It has been nominated for numerous other awards, including the Royal Television Society North Award for Best Drama, and the Kidscreen Award for Best New Series. It has also been nominated for three Canadian Screen Awards 2020, including one for Best Youth Show. For writing it has been nominated for a Writers Guild Of Great Britain Award and a British Screenwriters Award. In the acting department it has been nominated for a Young Artist Award for Berkley Silverman, Young Entertainer Award for Jordan Poole, and Young Artists Awards for both Jordan Poole and Justin Kelly, who also won a Joey Award for his role in episode "Kindlesticks."
