= The Hole in the Ground (2019 film) =

2019 film by Lee Cronin

- Theatrical release poster
- Directed by: Lee Cronin
- Written by: Lee Cronin; Stephen Shields
- Produced by: Conor Barry; John Keville
- Starring: Seána Kerslake; James Cosmo; Simone Kirby; Steve Wall; James Quinn Markey
- Cinematography: Tom Comerfeld
- Edited by: Colin Campbell
- Music by: Stephen McKeon
- Production companies: Savage Productions; Wrong Men; Made; Irish Film Board; Bankside Films; Wallimage; VOO; Be TV; BNP Paribas; Fortis Film Finance; Head Gear Films; Metrol Technology; Broadcasting Authority of Ireland; Finnish Film Foundation
- Distributed by: Wildcard Distribution (Ireland); Vertigo Films (United Kingdom)
- Release dates: 25 January 2019 (Sundance); 1 March 2019 (UK and Ireland)
- Running time: 90 minutes
- Countries: Belgium; Finland; Ireland; United Kingdom
- Language: English
- Box office: $3.4 million

The Hole in the Ground is a 2019 supernatural horror film, directed by Lee Cronin, and written by Cronin and Stephen Shields. It stars Seána Kerslake, James Cosmo, Simone Kirby, Steve Wall, and James Quinn Markey. It follows a woman who begins to suspect that her son's disturbing behaviour is linked to a mysterious sinkhole and the otherworldly beings who dwell within it. The film premiered at the Sundance Film Festival on 25 January 2019, and was released in the UK and Ireland on 1 March.

== Plot ==
Sarah O’Neill and her shy, arachnophobic son Christopher ("Chris") move to the Irish countryside. While driving home, Sarah and Chris get into a car accident when she almost hits an old woman named Noreen Brady standing in the middle of the road. After returning home, Sarah and Chris have an argument about Chris’s father, and Chris runs into the forest. Sarah follows Chris and finds him near a large sinkhole. At a dinner party, Sarah's friends recount the tale that Noreen believed her son James was not her real son and is rumored to have murdered him with a car.

Later that night, Sarah awakens to sounds downstairs and finds Chris missing from his bedroom. Failing to find him, she calls the police, only to discover Chris standing in the doorway of his bedroom. Sarah visits a doctor the next day and is prescribed sedatives. While driving Chris home from school, Sarah comes across Noreen. Noreen attacks the car and screams that the boy is not Sarah's son. Noreen's husband Des restrains her, and Sarah drives away in shock.

Sarah visits the Bradys’ house and discovers Noreen has died by an apparent suicide, by having her head buried in the dirt. During the funeral Sarah notices that all the mirrors in Noreen’s house are covered. Des tells Sarah that Noreen believed their son James was an impostor, saying she could tell by looking at the boy's reflection in a mirror. Des also reveals that it was he himself who killed James in a car accident.

Sarah begins to note odd changes in Chris when he becomes more sociable and develops a fondness for Sarah's cooking, which he previously hated. When Sarah confronts him about finding his toy soldier in the forest during a run, he grows enraged and pushes the dinner table in an uncharacteristic display of strength. One night Sarah observes Chris catching and eating a spider.

During Chris's performance in the school talent show, Sarah becomes convinced the boy is not Chris. She hides a camera in Chris's room in an effort to monitor his behavior and later shows Des the video footage. He is dismissive but cannot reassure her that the boy in the video is her son.

Sarah mixes her sedatives into Chris's food and later confronts him about his identity after Chris fails to recognize their favorite game. The imposter Chris attacks Sarah, knocking her unconscious. He buries Sarah's head in the ground but is knocked out by the sedatives soon after. Sarah frees herself and drags the imposter to the house's basement, where she uses a mirror to reveal the imposter to be an inhuman creature. Sarah locks him in the basement and flees to the forest's sinkhole.

Sarah goes to the bottom of the sinkhole and eventually finds Chris still alive among dozens of formless and faceless creatures. As the two escape, she is followed by one of the creatures, which takes Sarah's form. They manage to escape, and Sarah sets the house on fire with the imposter Chris still inside. Sarah and Chris start a new life in an unnamed city in an apartment filled with mirrors. She takes pictures of Chris from her window, one of which shows a blurred face.

== Cast ==
- Seána Kerslake as Sarah O'Neill
- James Cosmo as Des Brady
- Kati Outinen as Noreen Brady
- Simone Kirby as Louise Caul
- Steve Wall as Rob Caul
- James Quinn Markey as Chris O'Neill
- Eoin Macken as Jay Caul
- David Crowley as Teacher 1

== Release ==
In December 2018, A24 and DirecTV Cinema acquired U.S. distribution rights to the film. The same month, Vertigo Releasing acquired U.K. and Irish distribution rights. The film had its world premiere at the Sundance Film Festival on 25 January 2019, and was theatrically released in Ireland and the United States on 1 March 2019.

== Reception ==
=== Box office ===
The Hole in the Ground grossed a total worldwide of $3.4 million, with $21,072 in North America.

=== Critical response ===
On review aggregator Rotten Tomatoes, the film holds an approval rating of 83% based on 89 reviews, with an average rating of 6.3/10. The website's critical consensus reads, "The Hole in the Ground artfully exploits parental fears with a well-made horror outing that makes up in sheer effectiveness what it lacks in originality." On Metacritic, the film has a weighted average score of 63 out of 100, based on 16 critics, indicating "generally positive reviews."
