= Nicôle Lecky =

British actress

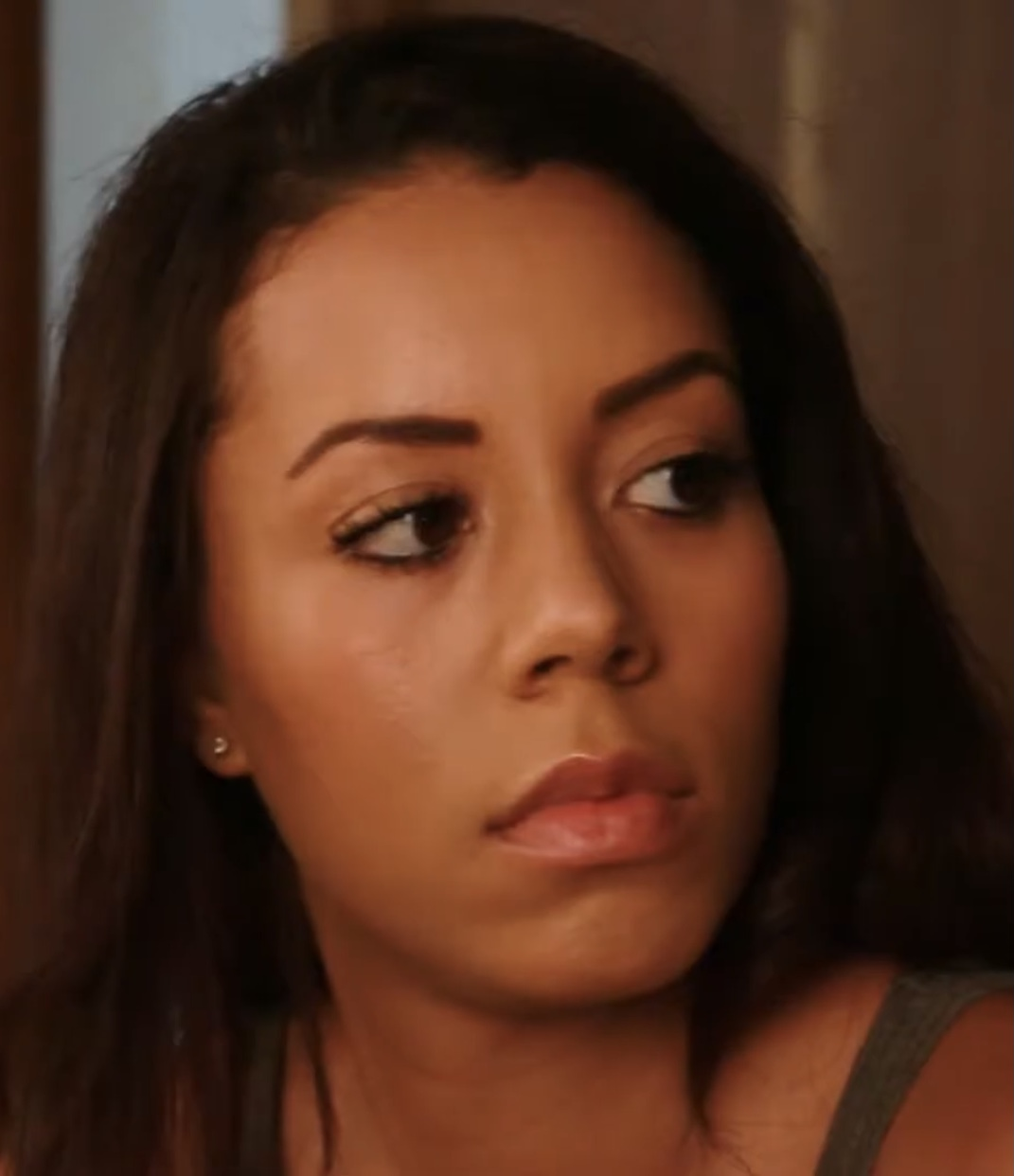
- Nicôle Lecky in 2018, picture from a comedy sketch with Milanka Brooks
- Born: 1990 (age 35–36); London, England
- Occupations: Actress; playwright; screenwriter
- Television: Mood (2022); Wild Cherry (2025)
- Awards: BAFTA Award for Best Mini-Series for Mood (2023)

Nicôle Lecky is a British actress, singer and writer. She is best known for her 2018 play Superhoe and its 2022 TV-series adaptation Mood.

== Early life ==
Lecky (born 1990) grew up in Stratford, East London. She is English-Jamaican and has siblings. Her father was an electrician and former DJ, and her mother a mental health nurse. Lecky studied for a time at King's College London, but graduated from Mountview Academy of Theatre Arts. At age 18, she was signed by a theatrical agent. Her mother died when Lecky was 19.

== Work ==
Lecky has written for the soap opera EastEnders: E20, and her acting roles include the TV-series Casualty, Fresh Meat, Sense8 and Death in Paradise. She directed The Moor Girl, a short film.

Her 2018 play Superhoe was a collaboration between the Talawa Theatre Company and the Royal Court Theatre, directed by Jade Lewis. Lecky wrote and performed the monodrama, and collaborated with British rapper The Last Skeptik on the play's music. Superhoe follows the life of twenty-four year-old Sasha, and Lecky plays several characters. She was inspired by a website that posted personal information on Instagram women involved in sex work. Playwright Levi David Addai, who mentored Lecky around 2019, said in 2020 that she is "one of the most talented young writers, actresses, singer-songwriters in the country right now."

Superhoe received positive reviews. The Evening Standard's reviewer said "[Lecky is] a revelation — singing and rapping eloquently as she delivers a knotty, occasionally grim story with charismatic fluency." The Daily Telegraph's reviewer said "It stands squarely in the tradition of Royal Court writing while being its own fresh thing." WhatsOnStage.com's reviewer said "She knows how to keep the audience on her side with just a backward glance, and her comic timing is superb." The Guardian's reviewer said "Lecky engagingly performs her own writing ... Though rarely surprising, it's a simple story strongly told". Stylist's reviewer said "...be sure to remember Nicôle Lecky. She’s a star slash genius." The Times' reviewer said "The music is terrific, but, if anything, this show could easily use another song. The plot, however, never surprises us even for a moment. ... This is a shame because Sasha has got such sass and spark. You won’t find her at Wetherspoons; you really can’t help but like her."

The BBC decided to adapt Superhoe as a TV-series, and the six part musical drama Mood premiered in 2022 on BBC Three. Lecky played the main character Sasha Clayton, was a series executive producer and writer, and was also involved in creating the music. The characters are those she performed in the play. As part of her script-writing, she interviewed women involved in sex work online. As of 2026, Mood has a 100% score on the review aggregator Rotten Tomatoes, based on five reviews. However, it had poor ratings on BBC3, averaging just 50,000 viewers per episode. Shortly after the premiere of Mood, Lecky was signed by the United Talent Agency (UTA).

Lecky played Julia Blenkinsopp in the 2024 Sky Atlantic comedy drama Sweetpea.

Lecky wrote, and appeared in, the drama Wild Cherry (2025) on BBC One.

== Recognition ==
Lecky was nominated for a Best Writer Stage Debut Award in 2019 for Superhoe. She won the New Talent category at the Women in Film and TV Awards in 2022.

Mood won two BAFTA awards, Best Mini-Series and Best Original Music: Fiction. Lecky was also nominated in a third category, Best Emerging Talent: Fiction. Accepting the mini-series award, she said "For me to be here, a working class, mixed, Black woman stood here I'm just really proud of that and I hope it really does inspire the next generation of storytellers." For Mood, she also received a Royal Television Society Craft & Design Award, Music - Original Score, and was nominated for a Royal Television Society Programme Breakthrough Award.

== Personal life ==
As of 2022, she lives in London.

== Filmography ==
=== Film ===
| Year | Title | Role | Notes |
|---|---|---|---|
| 2009 | Flak | Deborah | Short film |
| 2017 | The Moor Girl | Sarah | Short film. Also writer, director & producer |
| 2025 | Jay Kelly | Krista | Feature film |

=== Television ===
| Year | Title | Role | Notes |
|---|---|---|---|
| 2008 | West 10 LDN | Danielle | Television film |
| 2008 | Casualty | Nazrin Malik | Series 22; episode 43: "I Can Hear the Grass Grow" |
| 2008 | Silent Witness | Shana Block | Series 12; episode 1: "Safe: Part 1" |
| 2009 | Life of Riley | Grace | Series 1; episode 1: "In the Family Way" |
| 2009 | The Bill | Carmel Gladstone | Series 25; episode 9: "One Year On" |
| 2009 | My Almost Famous Family | Receptionist | Episode 10: "Can't Get You Out of My Head" |
| 2010 | Casualty | Cleopatra Valentino | Series 25; episode 6: "Eliminate the Negative" |
| 2010 | EastEnders: E20 | – | Writer, 2 episodes. Co-writer, 3 episodes |
| 2011 | Fresh Meat | Leila | Series 1; episode 3 |
| 2014 | The Midnight Beast | Northern Girl | Series 2; episode 4: "Going Solo" |
| 2014 | Edge of Heaven | Waitress | Episode 3 |
| 2015 | Sense8 | Bambie | Season 1; episodes 3, 4 & 6 |
| 2016 | Doctors | Maya Tanner | Series 17; episode 175: "Dracula's Choice" |
| 2019 | Death in Paradise | Tiana Palmer | Series 8; episodes 5 & 6 |
| 2019 | Ackley Bridge | – | Writer, series 3; episode 7 |
| 2020 | Unsaid Stories | Jordan | Mini-series; episode 4: "Lavender". Also writer |
| 2021 | Bloods | Yasmine | Series 1; episode 3: "Daycare" |
| 2022 | Mood | Sasha | Mini-series; episodes 1–6. Also creator, writer & exec. producer |
| 2024 | Sweetpea | Julia Blenkingsopp | Series 1; episodes 1–6 |
| 2025 | Wild Cherry | Gigi Gladstone | Episodes 1–6. Also creator, writer & exec. producer |

== Books ==
- Lecky, Nicôle (2019). Superhoe. Nick Hern Books. ISBN 978-1-84842-838-6.
