= Lee Cronin (director) =

Irish filmmaker (born 1982)

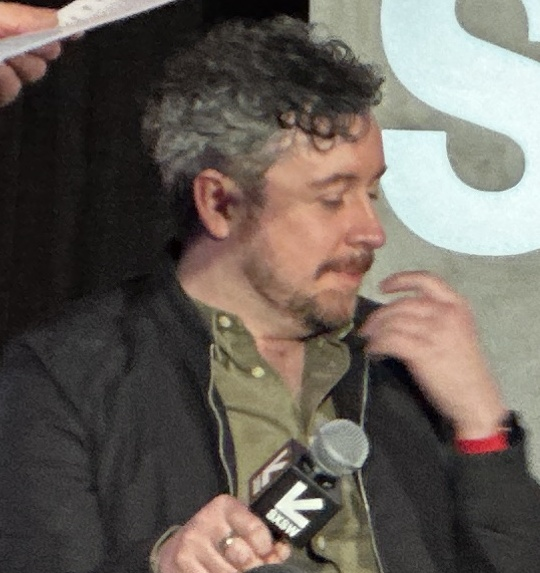
- Cronin in 2023
- Born: 24 January 1982 (age 44); Dublin, Ireland
- Occupations: Film director; screenwriter
- Years active: 2004–present

Lee Cronin (born 24 January 1982) is an Irish filmmaker. He is best known for directing horror films such as The Hole in the Ground (2019), Evil Dead Rise (2023), and Lee Cronin's The Mummy (2026).

== Life and career ==
Cronin was born in Dublin, Ireland, and started his career in making short films. He first achieved recognition for his short horror film Ghost Train (2013), which won the Méliès d'Argent and was featured in the horror anthology film Minutes Past Midnight (2016).

In 2019, he made his feature directorial debut with the horror film The Hole in the Ground (2019) for A24 and DirecTV Cinema.

In 2020, he directed two episodes of the horror television series 50 States of Fright.

In 2023, he wrote and directed the horror film Evil Dead Rise, the fifth installment in the Evil Dead franchise for New Line Cinema and Warner Bros. Pictures. Cronin also serves as an executive producer on the franchise's follow-up films Evil Dead Burn (2026) and Evil Dead Wrath (2028).

In March 2024, he co-founded his production company Wicked/Good (formerly Doppelgängers) with producers John Keville and Macdara Kelleher. The company signed a first-look deal with New Line Cinema.

In 2026, Cronin wrote and directed the horror film The Mummy for Atomic Monster, Blumhouse Productions and Wicked/Good. The film was released by New Line Cinema and Warner Bros. Pictures.

On April 17, 2026, in an interview with Cronin, it was announced that he and Glenn Montgomery were co-developing a folk horror television series titled Spiral for Blumhouse, Atomic Monster and Wicked/Good. Cronin and his company are also producing a found footage horror film and a slasher film. In that same interview, Cronin revealed that he is in development for his fourth feature horror film Box of Bones.

== Filmography ==
Feature film

Year	Title	Director	Writer	Producer	Notes
2019	The Hole in the Ground	Yes	Yes	No	
2023	Evil Dead Rise	Yes	Yes	No	
2026	Lee Cronin's The Mummy	Yes	Yes	Executive	
2026	Evil Dead Burn	No	No	Executive	
2028	Evil Dead Wrath	No	No	Executive	

Short film

Year	Title	Director	Writer	Producer	Notes
2004	Wilbur & Anto	Yes	Yes	Yes	
2010	Through the Night	Yes	Yes	No	
2011	Billy & Chuck	Yes	Yes	No	
2013	Ghost Train	Yes	Yes	No	Featured in Minutes Past Midnight (2016)

Television

Year	Title	Director	Writer	Notes
2011	The Masterplan	Yes	Yes	2 episodes
2020	50 States of Fright	Yes	No	2 episodes
