= Mood (TV series) =

2022 British television series

- Genre: Musical drama
- Created by: Nicôle Lecky
- Based on: Superhoe
- Written by: Nicôle Lecky
- Directed by: Dawn Shadforth; Stroma Cairns
- Country of origin: United Kingdom
- Original language: English
- No. of series: 1
- No. of episodes: 6

Production
- Executive producers: Margery Bone; Ayela Butt; Nicôle Lecky; Lucy Richer
- Producer: Lisa Walters
- Production companies: Bonafide Films; Babieka

Original release
- Network: BBC Three
- Release: 1 March – 5 April 2022

Mood is a British musical drama television series created and written by Nicôle Lecky, based on her one-woman play Superhoe. The six-part series premiered on BBC Three on 1 March 2022.

== Plot ==
Sasha Clay—a 25-year-old aspiring singer from London—is unemployed and financially unstable, and her boyfriend of ten years, Anton, has called time on their relationship after she allegedly slept with his brother Dion. She retaliates by recording verbally abusive video messages whilst pleading with Anton to forgive her before setting fire to his front yard, leading to an arson charge. Her bipolar weed dealer, Saleem, introduces her to another client, social media influencer Carly Visionz, who encourages Sasha to network at a party thrown for Esmerelda Akiva, a blackfishing beauty ambassador who recently acquired a million Instagram followers. Following an altercation with Laura's partner, Kevin, Sasha leaves home and attends the party where she is captivated by the glamour, but remains homeless once the event ends. After a short stay with Saleem, she moves in with Carly, but soon discovers the latter is actually an online sex worker. Sasha adopts the pseudonym "Lexi Caramel", with Carly receiving a hefty commission after introducing her to the business. As Sasha's online presence grows, she gains a steady social media following, but her new career takes a darker turn, and she comes to realise that the world of social media is less glamorous than she imagined.

== Cast ==
- Nicôle Lecky as Sasha Clay/Lexi Caramel, an aspiring musician
  - Ebony Aboagye as young Sasha Clayton
- Lara Peake as Carly Visionz, a social media influencer
- Jessica Hynes as Laura Clayton, Sasha's mother
- Paul Kaye as Kevin, Sasha's stepfather
- Mia Jenkins as Megan Clayton, Sasha's younger sister
- Jordan Duvigneau as Anton, Sasha's ex-boyfriend
- Flo Wilson as Melrose
- Chantelle Alle as Abi, Sasha's childhood friend
- Jorden Myrie as Kobi, Abi's younger brother
- Sai Bennett as Esmeralda, a rising influencer
- Mohammad Moses Dalmar as Saleem
- Khalid Laith as Kaspar
- Jason York as Curtis
- Tom Moutchi as Teeg Jones
- Kiell Smith-Bynoe as Alfred
- Tom Stourton as Josh
- Renee Bailey as Paris
- Jade Thirlwall as Jade
- Anna Vakili as herself
- Jess Gale as herself
- Eve Gale as herself
- Munya Chawawa as himself

== Episodes ==
No.	Title	Directed by	Written by	Original release date	U.K. viewers (millions)
1	"I Ain't Come To Pay I Came To Slay"	Dawn Shadforth	Unknown	March 1, 2022	N/A
2	"Babygirl"	Dawn Shadforth	Unknown	March 8, 2022	N/A
3	"Hannibal"	Dawn Shadforth	Unknown	March 15, 2022	N/A
4	"Get That Schmoneyyy"	Stroma Cairns	Unknown	March 22, 2022	N/A
5	"Bitches in Cages"	Stroma Cairns	Unknown	March 29, 2022	N/A
6	"F*** the fake sh**"	Stroma Cairns	Unknown	April 5, 2022	N/A

== Production ==
Lecky first performed her one-woman play Superhoe as a staged reading with the Talawa Theatre Company in 2018 followed by an official debut at the Royal Court Theatre in January 2019, by which point the BBC had already commissioned a pilot from Lecky. At the end of 2019, BBC Three officially greenlit the series, a six-part television adaptation of Lecky's play from Bonafide Films starring, written, and executive produced by Lecky herself. Also attached as executive producers were Lucy Richer, Ayela Butt, and Margery Bone. The pick-up by BBC Three was announced in February 2020.

The rest of the cast, including Lara Peake, Jessica Hynes, Paul Kaye Mia Jenkins, Jordan Duvigneau, Flo Wilson, Jorden Myrie, Jason York, Chantelle Alle, and Mohammad Dalmar, was revealed in October 2021. Notable guest actors included Sai Bennett, Tom Moutchi, Kiell Smith-Bynoe, Tom Stourton, and Renee Bailey. Little Mix singer Jade Thirlwall makes a cameo as Carly's nemesis Jade.

The creatives behind the series, including directors Dawn Shadforth and Stroma Cairns, first appeared on a panel to discuss the series at the 2021 BBC Showcase. Principal photography began in March 2021.

== Release ==
Mood, initially titled after the play Superhoe, was first announced in October 2021 as part of BBC's then upcoming winter slate. BBC Three released the series' trailer in February 2022. BBC Studios is distributing Mood internationally; it started airing on BBC America in the United States, premiering November 6, 2022.

Despite critical acclaim, BBC3 viewing figures were poor; episode three garnered only 54,594 viewers, and was 15th in that channel's ratings for the week of March 14–20.

== Accolades ==
Year	Award	Category	Nominee(s)	Result	Ref.
2022	Royal Television Society Craft & Design Awards	Music - Original Score	Nicôle Lecky, Bryan Senti	Won	
2023	Royal Television Society Programme Awards	Limited Series	Mood	Won	
2023	Royal Television Society Programme Awards	Breakthrough Awards	Nicôle Lecky	Nominated	
2023	British Academy Television Awards	Best Mini-Series	Nicôle Lecky, Margery Bone, Lisa Walters, Dawn Shadforth, Stroma Cairns	Won	
2023	British Academy Television Craft Awards	Best Emerging Talent: Fiction	Nicôle Lecky	Nominated	
2023	British Academy Television Craft Awards	Best Original Music: Fiction	Nicôle Lecky, Bryan Senti, Kwame KZ Kwei-Armah Jr.	Won	
