= The Evil Dead (disambiguation) =

The Evil Dead is a 1981 horror film and a franchise of sequels and other media.

The Evil Dead or Evil Dead may also refer to:

== Films and musicals ==
- Evil Dead II, a 1987 horror film of the same franchise
- Army of Darkness, a 1992 horror film, informally called Evil Dead 3
- Evil Dead: The Musical, a musical based on the film, first performed 2003
- Evil Dead (2013 film), a film starring Jane Levy
- Evil Dead Rise, a 2023 film starring Alyssa Sutherland and Lily Sullivan
- Evil Dead Burn, a 2026 film starring Souheila Yacoub
- Evil Dead Wrath, an upcoming film

== Television ==
- Ash vs Evil Dead, a 2015 American comedy horror television series

== Video games ==
- The Evil Dead (video game), 1984
- Evil Dead: Hail to the King, 2000
- Evil Dead: A Fistful of Boomstick, 2003
- Evil Dead: Regeneration, 2005
- Evil Dead: The Game, 2022

== Other uses ==
- Robert Bruce (rapper) (born 1970), American rapper and wrestler (wrestling stage name: Evil Dead)
- Evildead, an American thrash metal band
- "Evil Dead", a 1987 song by Death from Scream Bloody Gore
