= The Army of Darkness =

== Professional wrestling ==
- Kevin Sullivan (wrestler): Sullivan had a faction was named Army of Darkness.
- New Army of Darkness
- True Army of Darkness

== Related to Evil Dead ==
- Army of Darkness
  - Army of Darkness (comics)
  - Army of Darkness: Defense
  - Army of Darkness Roleplaying Game

== Other ==
- Beast King GoLion episode 45: Entitled "The Great Army of Darkness"
