= Evil Dead =

American horror franchise

- Official franchise logo
- Created by: Sam Raimi
- Original work: Within the Woods (1979)
- Owner: Renaissance Pictures
- Years: 1979–present

Print publications
- Comics: List of comics
- Graphic novels: Marvel Zombies vs. The Army of Darkness (2007); Freddy vs. Jason vs. Ash (2007); Freddy vs. Jason vs. Ash: The Nightmare Warriors (2009)

Films and television
- Films: The Evil Dead (1981); Evil Dead II (1987); Army of Darkness (1992); Evil Dead (2013); Evil Dead Rise (2023); Evil Dead Burn (2026); Evil Dead Wrath (2028)
- Short film: Within the Woods (1979)
- Television series: Ash vs Evil Dead (2015–2018)

Theatrical presentations
- Musical: Evil Dead The Musical

Games
- Video games: List of video games

Evil Dead is an American horror franchise created by Sam Raimi consisting of six feature films and a television series. The series follows various characters as they battle demonic forces unleashed by ancient grimoires.

The protagonist, Ashley Joanna "Ash" Williams (Bruce Campbell), appears in the original trilogy including The Evil Dead (1981), Evil Dead II (1987), and Army of Darkness (1992), all written and directed by Raimi, produced by Rob Tapert and starring Campbell. The franchise has since expanded into other formats, including video games, comic books, and a musical.

The film franchise was resurrected in 2013 with Evil Dead, a standalone sequel directed by Fede Álvarez, who co-wrote the screenplay with Rodo Sayagues. It was produced by Raimi, Campbell and Tapert, featuring a new protagonist in Mia Allen (Jane Levy). A television series, Ash vs Evil Dead, premiered on cable network Starz in 2015, lasted for three seasons, and ended in 2018. It starred Bruce Campbell as Ash and was executive produced by Campbell, Raimi and Tapert. A fifth film in the franchise, titled Evil Dead Rise, was theatrically released on April 21, 2023, with Lee Cronin serving as writer and director, Alyssa Sutherland and Lily Sullivan starring as sisters Ellie and Beth Bixler, Tapert serving as a producer, and Raimi and Campbell both acting as executive producers. A sixth film in the franchise, titled Evil Dead Burn, was theatrically released on July 10, 2026, with Sébastien Vaniček serving as writer and director, Hunter Doohan, Luciane Buchanan, Souheila Yacoub, Tandi Wright, and George Pullar starring, Raimi and Tapert serving as producers, and Campbell acting as an executive producer.

Each film of the franchise has received generally positive reviews from critics, with the original trilogy developing a cult following, and has grossed a collective $374 million worldwide.

== Films ==
Film	U.S. release date	Director(s)	Screenwriter(s)	Producer(s)
The Evil Dead	October 15, 1981	Sam Raimi	Sam Raimi	Rob Tapert
Evil Dead II	March 13, 1987	Sam Raimi	Sam Raimi & Scott Spiegel	Rob Tapert
Army of Darkness	February 19, 1993	Sam Raimi	Sam Raimi & Ivan Raimi	Rob Tapert
Evil Dead	April 5, 2013	Fede Álvarez	Fede Álvarez & Rodo Sayagues	Rob Tapert, Sam Raimi and Bruce Campbell
Evil Dead Rise	April 21, 2023	Lee Cronin	Lee Cronin	Rob Tapert
Evil Dead Burn	July 10, 2026	Sébastien Vaniček	Sébastien Vaniček & Florent Bernard	Sam Raimi and Rob Tapert
Evil Dead Wrath	April 7, 2028	Francis Galluppi	Francis Galluppi	Sam Raimi and Rob Tapert

=== Original trilogy ===
==== The Evil Dead (1981) ====
Filmed in 1979 and released in 1981, The Evil Dead is the first installment in the series. It introduces the protagonist Ash Williams, the Necronomicon Ex-Mortis (also known as the Book of the Dead), and the Deadites.

==== Evil Dead II (1987) ====
Released in 1987, Evil Dead II is the second installment in the series and serves as a direct sequel to The Evil Dead, continuing from the events of its predecessor following a brief recap. The film follows Ash Williams as he continues his battle against the Necronomicon Ex-Mortis and the Deadites, while introducing the slapstick comedy that became a defining characteristic of the series.

==== Army of Darkness (1992) ====
Filmed in 1991 and released in the United States in 1993, Army of Darkness is the third installment in the series. The film follows Ash Williams after he is transported to England in 1300 AD. Compared to the first two films, it shifts its focus toward action and slapstick comedy while keeping some horror elements.

=== Standalone films ===
==== Evil Dead (2013) ====
Evil Dead is a standalone sequel to the previous three films. Unlike those films, it does not feature the character of Ash Williams in a major role; Ash appears only briefly in a post-credits scene. Instead, the film follows a new protagonist, Mia Allen. It is considered a continuation of the franchise, and future installments featuring both Ash and Mia have been discussed.

==== Evil Dead Rise (2023) ====
In October 2019, Raimi announced at the New York Comic Con that a new film was officially green-lit and in development. Robert G. Tapert was set to produce, while Raimi and Campbell served as executive producers only, all under their Ghost House Pictures banner. In June 2020, Lee Cronin was chosen as a director with a script he wrote. Raimi chose the filmmaker from a list of potential directors to continue the franchise. Officially titled Evil Dead Rise, the project was announced to be developed by New Line Cinema and released on HBO Max. Principal photography commenced on June 6, 2021, in New Zealand. In May 2021, Alyssa Sutherland and Lily Sullivan had been cast in the film, followed by Gabrielle Echols, Morgan Davies, and Nell Fisher in June, and Mia Challis in July. Cronin stated the production was halfway completed by July 2021, and filming concluded on October 27, 2021. The filmmaker stated that the project used over 6,500 liters of fake blood during production. Evil Dead Rise was theatrically released on April 21, 2023.

==== Evil Dead Burn (2026) ====
A new film was announced to be in development in February 2024. Sébastien Vaniček directed with a script he co-wrote with Florent Bernard. Sam Raimi and Robert Tapert served as producers, with Ghost House Pictures producing the project. In December 2024, Vaniček revealed the title to be Evil Dead Burn.

Evil Dead Burn was theatrically released on July 10, 2026, starring Hunter Doohan, Luciane Buchanan, Souheila Yacoub, Tandi Wright, and George Pullar.

==== Evil Dead Wrath (2028) ====
In April 2024, it was announced that another mainline film is currently in development. Francis Galluppi will serve as writer and director. Sam Raimi and Robert Tapert will serve as producers, with Ghost House Pictures producing the project. Principal photography began on February 21, 2026, in Auckland, New Zealand.

Evil Dead Wrath will release theatrically on April 7, 2028. Charlotte Hope, Jessica McNamee, Zach Gilford, Josh Helman, Ella Newton, Ella Oliphant, and Elizabeth Cullen are set to star.

=== Future ===
In March 2023, Sam Raimi expressed interest in developing multiple sequels with Bruce Campbell reprising his role as Ash Williams in a starring role, while also expressing hope for future developments also featuring Mia Allen from Evil Dead (2013). Later that month, Campbell stated that after positive experiences as a producer on Evil Dead Rise, he would consider reprising his lead role in a future film if Raimi were to return as director, reversing his previous "retirement" from the role following the cancellation of Ash vs Evil Dead.

By April of the same year, writer/director Lee Cronin stated that he has ideas for a series of future Evil Dead installments serving as direct sequels to Evil Dead Rise, that he hopes to see realized. That same month, Campbell announced that Sam and Ivan Raimi were co-writing a bible to outline the future of the franchise; stating that films that follow will adhere to the overall outline, with current plans including releasing a new film in the franchise "every couple" of years, as opposed to the most recent activity of once every decade.

== Television ==
Series	Seasons	Episodes	Originally released			Showrunners
Series	Seasons	Episodes	First released	Last released	Network	Showrunners
Ash vs Evil Dead	3	30	October 31, 2015	April 29, 2018	Starz	Sam Raimi, Ivan Raimi & Tom Spezialy

=== Ash vs Evil Dead (2015–2018) ===
The series stars Bruce Campbell reprising his role as an older Ash Williams with a supporting cast that includes Dana DeLorenzo, Ray Santiago, Lucy Lawless and Jill Marie Jones. The series is executive produced by Campbell, Sam Raimi and Rob Tapert. It premiered on Starz on October 31, 2015.

Ash vs Evil Dead proved to be a critically well-received show, earning a 98% from Rotten Tomatoes. Four days before its premiere, the show was picked up for a second ten-episode season. The series lasted for three seasons (30 episodes) before it was canceled by Starz in April 2018.

==== Cancelled revival ====
Following the cancellation of Ash vs Evil Dead, Bruce Campbell announced he was officially retired from portraying the character of Ash, although he would continue to voice the character in animation. Subsequently, on July 25, 2022, Campbell announced that an animated revival of Ash vs Evil Dead was in active development, with Campbell returning as the voice of Ash. In a July 26, 2024 interview with Entertainment Weekly, Campbell confirmed the series was still in development. Saying: “I'll do Ash's voice all day long, because my voice hasn't aged as much as I have." On October 29, 2024, Campbell provided another update, stating that the series would not be a continuation of Ash vs Evil Dead. In an August 15, 2026 interview with Screen Rant, Campbell confirmed that the animated series will no longer be happening as he is officially retired from portraying the character of Ash in animation as well.

== Short film ==
Film	U.S. release date	Director(s)	Screenwriter(s)	Producer(s)
Within the Woods	1979	Sam Raimi	Sam Raimi	Sam Raimi, Rob Tapert & Bruce Campbell

=== Within the Woods (1979) ===
A prototype short film, Within the Woods, was produced by Sam Raimi on a micro-budget to market his concept and acquire funding from producers and studios for a feature-length film. The short was a meager success. Despite this, the release proceeded to spawn the entire franchise.

==== Development ====
In January 1978, Bruce Campbell was a college dropout who had just quit his job as a taxicab driver. Raimi was studying literature at Michigan State University with Rob Tapert, who was finishing his economics degree. While putting the finishing touches on It's Murder!, Tapert suggested doing a feature-length film to Raimi. Raimi felt it impossible, stating that they could never acquire the funding. Campbell declared: "I could always move back home." Tapert feared a career in fisheries/wildlife, while Raimi was afraid that he would have to go back to work at his dad's home furnishing store. These were the practical reasons that convinced the three to put forth a feature-length film. The three were big fans of the comedy genre, but they decided not to produce a comedy as they felt "a feature-length yuck fest just didn't compute". A well-noted scene from It's Murder moved Raimi to write the short film Clockwork. The three felt the result was very effective and represented a new direction that their films could take, that of a semi-successful horror film.

This would later lead to research of low-budget horror films at the local drive-in theater. The many films that they watched were the "two films for two dollars," allowing them the chance to document the behavior of what would become their target audience. Campbell said: "The message was very clear: Keep the pace fast and furious, and once the horror starts, never let up. 'The gorier the merrier' became our prime directive." The films they watched included Massacre at Central High and Revenge of the Cheerleaders. The idea to do a "prototype" was commissioned, to prove not only to themselves, but also to potential investors, that they were capable of doing a full-length horror film. The same year, at Michigan State, Raimi had been studying H. P. Lovecraft and was most impressed with Necronomicon, or simply The Book of the Dead. From these rough concepts, he concocted a short story where a group of four friends unwittingly dig up an Indian burial ground and unleash horrific spirits and demons. In the spring of 1978, filming of Within the Woods started over a three-day weekend, on a budget of $1,600.

Within the Woods, as well as serving as a prototype, had impressed the filmmakers. For a marketing strategy, a screening was arranged at their former high school, with a positive response.

==== Financing ====
Filming was first commissioned for the summer of 1979 in Michigan. In order to organize the budget, Sam Raimi, Robert Tapert and Bruce Campbell bought a few "how to make an independent film" guide publications. The budget was originally to be $150,000, while shooting with a Super 8 camera. However, due to technical difficulties, it was decided to move it up to 16 mm format, as they wanted to film the project in the style of the many low-budget films at the time that had come out in the 1970s. Since they had little experience in the film industry, the three felt they should buy business suits and briefcases as a means to convince investors that they "had all the answers." A man named Andy Grainger, who was a friend of Tapert and owner of a series of movie theaters, was the first primary investor. He stated: "Fellas, no matter what, just keep the blood running." As a tribute to him, there's a scene in the finished film where an old film projector whirs to life and "projects" blood running down the screen.

Most importantly, Grainger provided the name of a distributor in New York City whom they could approach for possible distribution. The company was Levitt-Pickman Films, who most recently was famous for Groove Tube, starring a very young Chevy Chase. The filmmakers took a train at $40 each, as they knew none of their cars could make an entire round trip. One of Campbell's old girlfriends named Andrea allowed them to stay at her apartment. Andrea's cat fell asleep on Raimi's face without even disturbing him; Raimi, who is allergic to cats, had his eyes swollen shut.

== Main cast and characters ==
List indicators
- This table only shows characters that have appeared in three or more films in the series.
- A dark gray cell indicates that the character was not in the film or that the character's presence in the film has yet to be announced.
- A ^{P} indicates the actor portrayed the possessed version of the character.
- An ^{A} indicates an appearance through archival footage or stills.
- A ^{C} indicates a cameo role.
- An ^{M} indicates the actor was part of the main cast for the season.
- An ^{R} indicates the actor was part of the recurring cast for the season.
- A ^{G} indicates the actor was part of the guest cast for the season.
- An ^{S} indicates a role shared with another actor.
- A ^{U} indicates an uncredited role.
- A ^{V} indicates a voice-only role.
- A ^{Pic} indicates the actor appears on picture.

Character		Original series			Ash vs Evil Dead			Standalone films			
Character		The Evil Dead	Evil Dead II	Army of Darkness	Season 1	Season 2	Season 3	Evil Dead	Evil Dead Rise	Evil Dead Burn	Evil Dead Wrath
Character		1981	1987	1992	2015–16	2016	2018	2013	2023	2026	2028
=== Protagonists ===
Ashley "Ash" Williams		Bruce Campbell	Bruce Campbell	Bruce Campbell	Bruce Campbell^{M}	Bruce Campbell^{M}	Bruce Campbell^{M}	Bruce Campbell^{U}^{C}	Bruce Campbell^{U}^{C}^{V}	Mentioned	
Pablo Simon Bolivar					Ray Santiago^{M}	Ray Santiago^{M}	Ray Santiago^{M}				
Kelly Maxwell					Dana DeLorenzo^{M}	Dana DeLorenzo^{M}	Dana DeLorenzo^{M}				
Ruby Knowby Rebecca Prevett					Lucy Lawless^{M}	Lucy Lawless^{M}	Lucy Lawless^{M}				
Brandy Barr							Arielle Carver-O'Neill^{M}				
Mia Allen								Jane Levy			
David Allen								Shiloh Fernandez		Mentioned	
Bethany "Beth" Bixler									Lily Sullivan		
Kassie Bixler									Nell Fisher		
Alice Price										Souheila Yacoub	
TBA											Charlotte Hope
=== Deadites ===
The Evil Dead(ites)		Sam Raimi^{V}	William Preston Robertson^{V}	Ted Raimi^{V}	Various^{V}	Various^{V}	Various^{V}	Rupert Degas^{V}	Alyssa Sutherland^{V}	Luciane Buchanan^{V}	TBA
Linda		Betsy Baker	Denise Bixler Snowy Winters^{P}^{S}	Bridget Fonda	Rebekkah Farrell						
Cheryl Williams		Ellen Sandweiss				Ellen Sandweiss		Ellen Sandweiss^{C}^{V}^{A}			
Scott "Scotty"		Richard DeManincor									
Bad/Evil Ash			Bruce Campbell	Bruce Campbell	Bruce Campbell		Bruce Campbell				
Henrietta Knowby			Lou Hancock Ted Raimi^{P}^{S}			Alison Quigan Ted Raimi^{P}^{S}					
Professor Ed Getley			Richard Domeier								
The Mini-Ashes				Bruce Campbell Bruce Thomas Deke Anderson Jerry Rector							
Deadite Captain				Bill Moseley							
Possessed Witch				Patricia Tallman							
Vivian Johnson					Siân Davis^{G}			Siân Davis			
Amanda Fisher					Jill Marie Jones^{M}						
Little Lori					Bridget Hoffmann^{V}						
Heather					Samara Weaving^{G}						
Chet Kaminski						Ted Raimi^{M}					
Sheriff Thomas Emery						Stephen Lovatt^{R}					
Lacey Emery						Pepi Sonuga^{R}					
Eric								Lou Taylor Pucci		Mentioned	
Olivia								Jessica Lucas		Mentioned	
Natalie								Elizabeth Blackmore		Mentioned	
Abomination Mia								Randal Wilson			
The Marauder	Ellie Bixler								Alyssa Sutherland	Alyssa Sutherland^{C}	
The Marauder	Bridget Bixler								Gabrielle Echols		
The Marauder	Danny Bixler								Morgan Davies		
Jessica									Anna-Maree Thomas Greta Van Den Brink^{P}^{S}	Greta Van Den Brink	
Susan Price										Tandi Wright	
Joseph Price										Hunter Doohan	
Thya										Luciane Buchanan	
Edgar Price										Erroll Shand	
Polly Price										Maude Davey	
William "Will" Price										George Pullar	
=== Recurring characters ===
Shelly		Theresa Tilly									
Professor Raymond Knowby		Bob Dorian^{V}	John Peaks			Nicholas Hope^{G}		Bob Dorian^{C}^{V}^{A}		Mentioned	
Annie Knowby			Sarah Berry							Mentioned	
Lord Arthur				Marcus Gilbert							
Duke Henry the Red				Richard Grove							
Jenny				Angela Featherstone							
El Brujo					Hemky Madera^{R}		Hemky Madera^{G}				
Eligos					Ben Fransham^{R} Jared Turner^{V}						
Baal						Joel Tobeck^{R}					
Tanya						Sara West^{R}					
Brock Williams						Lee Majors^{R}	Lee Majors^{G}				
=== Other characters ===
Jake (Evil Dead II)			Dan Hicks								
Bobby Joe			Kassie DePaiva								
Sheila				Embeth Davidtz							
Wiseman				Ian Abercrombie							
Linda B. Emery						Michelle Hurd^{M}					
Dalton							Lindsay Farris^{M}				
Caleb									Richard Crouchley		
Teresa									Mirabai Pease	Severed head	
Gabriel									Jayden Daniels		
Jake (Evil Dead Rise)									Billy Reynolds-McCarthy		
Scott (Evil Dead Rise)									Tai Wano		
Mr. Fonda									Mark Mitchinson		
Father Marcus Littleton									Mark Mitchinson^{V}		
Leo										Victory Ndukwe	
Jared										Keanu Karim	
Mike										Tapiwa Soropa	
Professor Benjamin Price										Michael Hurst^{V}	

=== Additional crew and production details ===
Role
Role	The Evil Dead	Evil Dead II	Army of Darkness	Evil Dead	Ash vs Evil Dead	Evil Dead Rise	Evil Dead Burn	Evil Dead Wrath
Composer	Joseph LoDuca	Joseph LoDuca	Joseph LoDuca; Danny Elfman (themes)	Roque Baños	Joseph LoDuca	Stephen McKeon	Double Danger	TBA
Cinematographer	Tim Philo	Peter Deming	Bill Pope	Aaron Morton	Dave Garbett; John Cavill	Dave Garbett	Philip Lozano	TBA
Editor	Edna Ruth Paul	Kaye Davis	Bob Murawski; R.O.C. Sandstorm	Bryan Shaw	Bob Murawski	Bryan Shaw	Maxime Caro	TBA
Production companies	Renaissance Pictures	Renaissance Pictures; Rosebud Releasing	Renaissance Pictures; Dino De Laurentiis Communications	FilmDistrict; Ghost House Pictures; TriStar Pictures	Renaissance Pictures; Starz Originals	Ghost House Pictures; New Line Cinema	New Line Cinema; Ghost House Pictures; Screen Gems	New Line Cinema; Ghost House Pictures; Screen Gems
Distributing companies	New Line Cinema	De Laurentiis Entertainment Group	Universal Pictures	Sony Pictures Releasing	Anchor Bay Entertainment	Warner Bros. Pictures	Warner Bros. Pictures (United States and Canada); Sony Pictures Releasing International (International)	
Running time	85 minutes	84 minutes	81 minutes	92 minutes	25–37 minutes	97 minutes	109 minutes	TBA

== Reception ==
=== Box office performance ===
Film	Box office revenue			Budget	Reference
Film	United States	International	Worldwide	Budget	Reference
The Evil Dead	$2,400,000	$27,495,379	$29,895,379	$375,000	
Evil Dead II	$5,923,044	$5,890	$5,928,934	$3.5 million	
Army of Darkness	$11,502,976	$10,002,949	$21,505,925	$11 million	
Evil Dead	$54,239,856	$43,303,096	$97,542,952	$17 million	
Evil Dead Rise	$67,219,338	$78,800,000	$147,256,372	$15 million	
Evil Dead Burn	$32,237,058	$40,045,533	$72,282,591	$20 million	
Total	$173,522,272	$199,652,847	$374,412,153	$66.88 million	

=== Critical and public response ===
Title	Rotten Tomatoes	Metacritic	CinemaScore
The Evil Dead	85% (86 reviews)	71/100 (11 reviews)	—N/a
Evil Dead II	88% (84 reviews)	72/100 (18 reviews)	—N/a
Army of Darkness	68% (91 reviews)	59/100 (32 reviews)	—N/a
Evil Dead	64% (203 reviews)	57/100 (38 reviews)	C+
Ash vs Evil Dead (season 1)	98% (52 reviews)	76/100 (32 reviews)	—N/a
Ash vs Evil Dead (season 2)	100% (17 reviews)	82/100 (5 reviews)	—N/a
Ash vs Evil Dead (season 3)	100% (15 reviews)	—N/a	—N/a
Evil Dead Rise	85% (241 reviews)	69/100 (38 reviews)	B
Evil Dead Burn	70% (211 reviews)	54/100 (36 reviews)	B

== Other media ==
=== Video games ===
There have been multiple Evil Dead video games:

- The Evil Dead (1984) for Commodore 64 and ZX Spectrum
- Evil Dead: Hail to the King (2000) for PlayStation, Dreamcast and PC
- Evil Dead: A Fistful of Boomstick (2003) for PlayStation 2 and Xbox
- Evil Dead Pinball (2003) for mobile
- Evil Dead: Regeneration (2005) for PlayStation 2, Xbox and PC
- Army of Darkness: Defense (2011) for iOS and Android
- Evil Dead: The Game (2011) for iOS
- Evil Dead: Endless Nightmare (2016) for iOS and Android
- Evil Dead: Virtual Nightmare (2018) for Oculus Go
- Evil Dead: The Game (2022) for PlayStation 4 and 5, Xbox Series X/S, Xbox One and PC
- RetroRealms: Ash vs Evil Dead (2024) for Nintendo Switch, PlayStation 4, PlayStation 5, Windows, Xbox One, and Xbox Series X/S

Ash Williams also appears as a playable character, along with Kelly and Pablo from the Ash vs Evil Dead television series, in Deploy and Destroy, a competitive multiplayer FPS available for iOS and Android, and also as a non-playable character in Telltale Games' game Poker Night 2. He also appears as a playable character in Dead by Daylight, Call of Duty: Modern Warfare II, Call of Duty: Warzone, and as an outfit in Fortnite Battle Royale.

=== Comic books ===
==== Dark Horse Comics ====
In 1992, Dark Horse Comics produced a mini-series adaptation of Army of Darkness adapted and illustrated by John Bolton. A trade paperback of this series was released by Dynamite Entertainment on September 25, 2006.

In 2008, Dark Horse revisited the franchise with a four issue adaptation of The Evil Dead written by Mark Verheiden and once again illustrated by John Bolton.

==== Dynamite Entertainment ====
In 2004, Dynamite Entertainment acquired the license to publish titles based on Army of Darkness and, in conjunction with Devil's Due Publishing, released the Army of Darkness: Ashes 2 Ashes mini-series. A second mini-series, Army of Darkness: Shop till You Drop Dead followed in 2005. Later that year, Dynamite separated itself from Devil's Due and began focusing entirely on self-published titles featuring the Army of Darkness franchise. This included an ongoing series that began in 2005 and saw Ash battling other horror icons such as Herbert West and Dracula. The series lasted thirteen issues before being rebooted with a second volume in 2007. The second series lasted twenty-seven issues before coming to an end. Over the years, there have also been several one-shot specials as well as crossovers with a wide variety of characters such as, Marvel Zombies, Darkman, Freddy Krueger, Jason Voorhees, Xena, Danger Girl and even Barack Obama. The series was then rebooted in 2013 and started over from the last scene in titular film because Ash misspoke the words S-Mart was sent back in time to the Medieval times where the wiseman has been possessed, Ash fights through many battles with the same characters from the film. At the end of this series Ash proposes to Sheila, in the next series "Ash gets hitched" they get married but Ash gets sent forward in time when he accidentally speaks a phrase that opens up a vortex. He wants to get back to Sheila but runs into many situations causing delays, he is currently in space fighting the evil.

==== Space Goat Productions ====
In 2015, Space Goat Productions acquired the license to publish titles based on Evil Dead 2. The company has released, or was planning on releasing, the following titles:

- Evil Dead 2: Beyond Dead By Dawn, a three-issue mini-series which debuted in June 2015
- Evil Dead 2: Tales of the Ex-Mortis, a three-issue anthology which debuted in August 2015.
- Evil Dead 2: Cradle of the Damned, a three-issue mini-series which debuted in January 2016
- A series of Evil Dead 2: Revenge of ... one-shots, which began with Hitler in March 2016 and will be followed by Dracula, the Martians, Jack the Ripper and Krampus
- Evil Dead 2: Dark Ones Rising, a three-issue miniseries which debuted in August 2016
- Evil Dead 2: The official board game, a board game made about the film.

The official board game was funded through Kickstarter in 2018, but Space Goat Productions never produced the game, nor refunded money to the investors. They ceased all communications with customers and investors that year and refused to discuss the game with media.

==== Freddy vs. Jason vs. Ash ====
In the documentary The Untold Saga of The Evil Dead, Rob Tapert states that New Line Cinema and Warner Bros. Pictures wanted to do Ash vs. Freddy vs. Jason: "We thought about it for one second but we knew we would have totally trashed the franchise in doing that, in that there would be no reason to reunite Bruce and Sam for Evil Dead 4 whatever that would be nor would there be any reason to go back and reinvent the original Evil Dead with a hot new filmmaker". Two comic book series were produced based on this concept, titled Freddy vs. Jason vs. Ash and Freddy vs. Jason vs. Ash: The Nightmare Warriors.

=== Musical ===
The production team of George Reinblatt, Christopher Bond and Frank Cipolla created an Off Broadway show titled Evil Dead: The Musical, based on the film series. Its New York run was directed by Bond and Hinton Battle, who also choreographed the show. Ryan Ward played the part of Ash. Tying in with the midnight movie plot of a group of friends visiting a wooded cabin and unleashing untold evil, performances did not start until 11 p.m. on Fridays and Saturdays. Previews began October 1 and the show opened November 1 at the New World Stages. It was announced on January 31, 2007, that Evil Dead: The Musical's New York production at New World Stages would close on February 17, 2007. Toronto producers announced a new production of the show, also starring Ryan Ward, at the Diesel Playhouse. The new production started its running May 1, 2007, and has been announced to end on September 8, 2007, which won the Dora Audience Choice Award and praised by the Toronto Star.

In 2017, the English comedian Rob Kemp created and performed the stage show The Elvis Dead, a retelling of Evil Dead II in the style of Elvis Presley.

== Legacy ==
In Italy, The Evil Dead was released under the title La Casa (a.k.a. The House) and Evil Dead II became La Casa II. These were followed by three unrelated movies: Umberto Lenzi's La Casa 3 (a.k.a. Ghosthouse) (1988), Fabrizio Laurenti's La Casa 4 (a.k.a. Witchery) (1988) and Claudio Fragasso's La Casa 5 (a.k.a. Beyond Darkness) (1990). This is similar to what has happened in George A. Romero's Living Dead series starting with Zombi 2. House II: The Second Story (1987) and The Horror Show (1989) were retitled La Casa 6 and La Casa 7, respectively, in their Italian releases.

Evil Dead influenced numerous directors, such as Peter Jackson and Edgar Wright, and inspired films such as Shaun of the Dead, The Cabin in the Woods, Bubba Ho-Tep, Dead Alive, Dead Snow, and Tucker & Dale vs. Evil. The Cabin in the Woods features many references to the film and even features Deadites and the possessed trees, although this is considered more a reference than a direct sequel. The 2012 Swedish language film Wither serves as an unofficial remake of The Evil Dead, starring Patrik Almkvist as Albin Wiliams (Ash Williams) In 2020, Steve Villenevue premiered the documentary Hail to the Deadites, which focuses on the franchise's fandom and legacy. It features interviews from people involved with the film, such as Bruce Campbell, as well as with fans. Moreover, Death Whisperer and Death Whisperer 2, two Thai supernatural horror films in 2023 and 2024, the director Taweewat Wantha admitted that he used the haunting style of the ghosts in Evil Dead as inspiration.

The Evil Dead films and the character of Ash influenced 1990s first-person shooter video games such as Doom, Duke Nukem 3D and Blood. Duke Nukem quotes so many lines from Ash that Bruce Campbell stated that he was angered by not being paid for them. Evil Dead was cited as an inspiration for the original Doom.

Bruce Campbell directed and starred in a film titled My Name Is Bruce. It does not continue the story of Army of Darkness but is a fictionalized portrayal of Bruce living his everyday life, in which he is erroneously believed to be as heroic as the Ash character and is hired to fight an ancient spirit. The film was released to a limited number of theaters on October 26, 2008, and was released on DVD and Blu-ray on February 10, 2009. A 2021 episode of Creepshow, "Public Television of the Dead", serves as a crossover with the franchise, featuring Ted Raimi (portraying himself, who previously portrayed the Deadite Henrietta Knowby and Chet Kaminski in Evil Dead II and Ash vs Evil Dead respectively) as he accidentally uses the Necronomicon to summon Deadites at a television station.

== Lawsuits ==
Awards Pictures, a company that attempted to begin a new line of movies in the series in 2004, announced plans in May 2012 to film an Evil Dead 4, one that has nothing to do with the original films. Sam Raimi sued Awards Pictures in an attempt to stop them from making the film, because he planned to someday film one himself. In August 2012, U.S. District Judge Dale Fischer entered a default judgment that "permanently enjoined" Awards Pictures from using the names Evil Dead, Evil Dead: Genesis of the Necronomicon, Evil Dead: Genesis of the Necronomicon: Part 2 or Evil Dead: Consequences "as or as part of the title of a motion picture, television program, video game, play, book or any other form of entertainment provided or to be provided through any media."
