= Evil Dead: Regeneration =

2005 video game

- Developer: Cranky Pants Games (Note: Ported to Windows by Beenox.)
- Publisher: THQ
- Producer: Raphael Hernandez
- Composers: Keith Arem; Michael Cohen
- Engine: RenderWare
- Platforms: Windows, PlayStation 2, Xbox
- Release: PlayStation 2, Xbox: NA: September 13, 2005; AU: September 16, 2005; EU: September 30, 2005; Windows: NA: September 20, 2005; AU: September 23, 2005; EU: September 30, 2005
- Genres: Action, hack and slash
- Mode: Single-player

Evil Dead: Regeneration is an action hack and slash video game developed by American studio Cranky Pants Games, published by THQ, and released for Windows, PlayStation 2 and Xbox. It is based on The Evil Dead series. It is unconnected to the previous video game Evil Dead: A Fistful of Boomstick. The game takes place in an alternate reality from the original trilogy where the film Army of Darkness never took place, depicting what would have happened if Ash did not get sent back in time at the end of the film Evil Dead II.

== Plot ==
Ash Williams (voiced by Bruce Campbell) is locked away in an asylum for the criminally insane, as a result of the events that took place in The Evil Dead and Evil Dead II. Convinced the world thinks he is crazy, the truth is much more nefarious. His doctor, Dr. Reinhard, somehow in possession of Professor Raymond Knowby's diary and the Necronomicon Ex-Mortis, plans on using the books to bring about his ascension to power. In the process he releases an army of Deadites on the unsuspecting world and it is Ash's job to stop the doctor and put the Deadites back where they belong.

The game begins in Sunny Meadows, the asylum Ash is committed to. Ash is briefly visited by his lawyer, Sally Bowline who mentions how she found Professor Knowby's diary and believes Ash's story about the Necronomicon and the cabin. Ash thanks Sally for her efforts and awkwardly flirts with her. Just after Sally leaves, Reinhard accidentally unleashes the dead through the Necronomicon. The evil also breaks Ash free in the process. Ash travels through the asylum killing deadites with a pistol he retrieved from a dead security guard. He eventually finds his clothing, his boomstick and his chainsaw in the process. As he goes through the asylum, Ash finds an electric deadite named Sparky. Ash kills Sparky and decapitates him. Ash briefly breaks the fourth wall, telling us that "Ash is back in business", and throws Sparky's head away. Ash proceeds through the nearby cellar. However, just as he is about to leave the asylum, Professor Knowby's spirit appears to Ash, telling him that Reinhard's plan requires the closing of several portals and how Sally is in danger for having the diary. Ash teams up with a diminutive victim of Reinhard, a half-dead man named Sam (voiced by Ted Raimi) who can return from any death (as he is half-Deadite, but isn't affected by the evil). His condition grants him many mystical skills.

Ash and Sam travel through to a cemetery and eventually find a portal in the nearby catacombs. However, guarding the portal is a large deadite queen. Ash kills the queen with Sam's help and Sam closes the portal. The evil spirit inside the queen goes into Ash, briefly making him a deadite. However, for some reason, Ash can now control when he can turn into "Evil Ash".

Ash and Sam go through the woods surrounding Sunny Meadows to find it infested with deadites as well. Ash finds a harpoon gun in a trash pile and modifies it onto his right hand. Ash and Sam, with the help of his harpoon gun, make their way into an abandoned mine where they find another portal while fending off deadite miners. However, as soon as they get there, a spirit possesses one of the deadite miners, turning it into a hulking monster. Ash and Sam kill the deadite miner and close the portal. Professor Knowby tells them that Reinhard has his diary finally and needs a human sacrifice. Ash believes that Sally is the one he intends to sacrifice. Ash and Sam follow a mine shaft towards nearby docks where another portal is believed to be located; while there, Ash goes through another trash pile and finds a high powered torpedo gun. The duo destroy a fish creature guarding the docks portal.

Ash and Sam make their way through a swamp, where they find a shack full of flammable materials that allows Ash to create a flamethrower. Ash and Sam make their way through the swamp to a nearby town called Port Turnham which is infested with Deadites. They make their way through the destroyed city and in the process Ash replaces his chainsaw with a newer one with a titanium blade. Ash and Sam find a portal in a nearby courthouse. However, Sam succumbs to fatigue and yawns while he is saying the incantation. The portal, instead of closing, sucks both of them into it. Once they are inside the portal Ash and Sam find themselves in a hellish dimension. Professor Knowby shows up telling them the only way out is to defeat Reinhard and rescue Sally. However, he begins talking about how Ash must save the world in which Ash becomes very angry and says he is only out to save Sally and maybe Sam.

Ash and Sam face many obstacles in the Deadite temple, but after much struggle they make their way to Reinhard's lair where he is just about to sacrifice Sally. Reinhard says how impressed he is with Ash. However, he apologizes that they had to come a long way to die. Rienhard uses the Necronomicon to turn himself into a troll-like Deadite. Ash and Sam kill Reinhard and Sam closes the portal. In a very romantic scene Ash says he came a long way and overcame great odds to apologize to Sally on the fashion advice he gave her back at Sunny Meadows. Just as he is leaning to kiss Sally, a spirit possesses her. Ash, overcome with rage, shoots the possessed Sally. However, just as he does this the portal reopens and sucks Ash and Sam into it along with the Necronomicon possibly sending them back in time, presumably to its own alternate version of Army of Darkness.

== Gameplay ==
The gameplay mostly consists of hack and slash with small conveniently placed puzzles. The player takes the role of Ash Williams as he fights off hordes of Deadites. The player can find different kinds of weapons in levels which find use in different situations. Early on in the game Ash receives his sidekick Sam who fights along with him in battle. Unlike other games where killing a friend ingame is taboo at best, Sam actually comically dies many times in the game. The player can kick Sam into openings to open doors or onto enemies to pop their heads off. The player can also possess Sam to get through small openings; the purpose is to open a door or a switch. At times, Sam is controlled by the computer and destroys adversaries without assistance. Sometimes enemies will need a 'finishing move' (pressing a specific button) in order to completely destroy them.

In contrast with previous games, the game automatically gives the player unlimited ammunition for his weapons and unlimited gas to his chainsaw. A new gameplay element is rage mode. When the player kills enough enemies it fills up his rage meter. When the rage meter is filled up to a decent amount it allows Ash to go into "rage mode". Rage mode transforms Ash into a powerful deadite killing machine. It instantly doubles all of Ash's weapon damage and makes him lose health slower.

== Reception ==
Reception

Aggregate score
Aggregator	Score		
Aggregator	PC	PS2	Xbox
Metacritic	69/100	68/100	66/100

Review scores
Publication	Score		
Publication	PC	PS2	Xbox
Electronic Gaming Monthly	N/A	5.5/10	5.5/10
Game Informer	N/A	6/10	6/10
GamePro	3.5/5	3.5/5	3.5/5
GameRevolution	N/A	C+	C+
GameSpot	N/A	6.9/10	6.9/10
GameSpy	N/A	3/5	3/5
GameTrailers	7.9/10	7.9/10	7.9/10
GameZone	N/A	6.4/10	6.6/10
IGN	6.6/10	6.8/10	6.8/10
Official U.S. PlayStation Magazine	N/A	3.5/5	N/A
Official Xbox Magazine (US)	N/A	N/A	6.5/10

Evil Dead: Regeneration received "average" reviews on all platforms, according to the review aggregation website Metacritic. Adam Dodd of Bloody Disgusting wrote that it is "probably the best full-scope console game out there in terms of mechanics" but criticized it for its "addition of an obnoxious sidekick and way too many tedious escort missions".
