= Hail to the Deadites =

- Film poster
- Directed by: Steve Villeneuve
- Written by: Steve Villeneuve
- Produced by: Glen Alexander; Steve Villeneuve
- Cinematography: Jonathan Bonenfant
- Edited by: Steve Villeneuve
- Production company: DiggerFilms
- Release date: August 20, 2020 (FantasiaFest)
- Running time: 89 minutes
- Country: Canada
- Language: English

Hail to the Deadites is a 2020 Canadian documentary film that was written and directed by Steve Villeneuve, who also served as one of the producers. The documentary premiered at the 2020 Fantasia Film Festival and centers upon the legacy of the Evil Dead franchise.

== Synopsis ==
The documentary examines the fandom and legacy of the Evil Dead franchise. At the time the film was completed, the franchise spanned three original films, one reboot film, a short film, a television series, a musical, and multiple video games and comic book series. For the documentary, Villeneuve interviewed both people involved with the film such as Bruce Campbell, as well as fans of the movie from throughout the world.

== Production ==
Hail to the Deadites took multiple years to complete. When making the documentary, Villenevue chose not to include footage from the franchise, stating that he was "proud to say that everything you will see or hear in this documentary was created by the fans."

== Release ==
Hail to the Deadites had its world premiere on 20 August 2020, at the Fantasia Film Festival.

== Reception ==
Hail to the Deadites holds a rating of 78% on Rotten Tomatoes, based on 27 reviews. A common aspect praised in reviews was the fan interviews, with NME highlighting an interview with the father of a child he named Ash, calling it "a heartrending reminder of the strange and unexpected ways in which stories become woven into our lives, helping us to make sense of ourselves and those we love."

The Daily Dead was more critical as they felt that the documentary was too generic, writing that "Truth be told, this is a documentary that could have been made about any other horror franchise out there, and the results would be exactly the same."

=== Awards ===
- Bronze Award for Best Documentary at the Fantasia Film Festival (2020, won)
