= Ash Williams =

Fictional character

- Evil Dead character
- Bruce Campbell as Ash Williams in Ash vs Evil Dead
- First appearance: The Evil Dead (1981)
- Created by: Sam Raimi
- Portrayed by: Bruce Campbell; Donal Thoms-Cappello (The Official Evil Dead 2 Escape Room)
- Voiced by: Bruce Campbell; Danny Webber (Poker Night 2)
- Appearances: Films: The Evil Dead; Evil Dead II; Army of Darkness; Evil Dead; Evil Dead Rise (voice); Television: Ash vs Evil Dead; Video games: The Evil Dead; Evil Dead: Hail to the King; Evil Dead: A Fistful of Boomstick; Evil Dead: Regeneration; Army of Darkness: Defense; Poker Night 2; Deploy and Destroy; Family Guy: The Quest for Stuff; Hit It Rich! Evil Dead 2; Dead by Daylight; Phantom Halls; Evil Dead: The Game; Fortnite; Call of Duty: Modern Warfare II / Call of Duty: Warzone 2.0; RetroRealms: Ash vs Evil Dead; RetroRealms: Halloween (crossover)

In-universe information
- Full name: Ashley Joanna Williams
- Aliases: The One; El Jefe; Ashy Slashy
- Nickname: Ash
- Gender: Male
- Occupation: Film trilogy: Sales clerk at S-Mart; Ash vs Evil Dead: Stockboy at Value Stop (formerly); Owner of Ashy Slashy's Hardware Store and Sex Toy Emporium
- Family: Cheryl Williams (sister; deceased); Brock Williams (father; deceased); Caroline Williams (mother; deceased)
- Spouses: Sheila Williams (Ash and the Army of Darkness); Candace "Candy" Barr (legal wife; deceased)
- Significant others: Linda; Linda Bates; Jenny; Amanda Fisher; Brock Samson
- Children: Brandy Barr (daughter; Ash vs Evil Dead); Unnamed child (with Sheila; Army of Darkness comics and Poker Night 2)
- Birth date: April 8th, 1957
- Friends: Scott; Shelly; Linda; Chet Kaminski; Pablo Simon Bolivar; Kelly Maxwell; Dalton
- Hometown: Elk Grove, Michigan, United States
- Status: Alive

Ashley Joanna "Ash" Williams is a fictional character and the protagonist of the Evil Dead franchise. Created by Sam Raimi, he is portrayed by Bruce Campbell. Throughout the series, Ash faces off against "Deadites", creatures possessed by the ancient evil of the Kandarian Demon. Since his debut, has been considered a cultural icon and a horror hero. In 2008, Ash was selected by Empire magazine as the 24th greatest movie character ever, and in 2013, was voted by Empire as the greatest horror movie character of all time.

== Appearances ==
=== Films ===
==== The Evil Dead (1981) ====
Ash and his girlfriend Linda, sister Cheryl, and friends Scott and Shelly stay at a log cabin in the woods, where they find the "Naturom Demonto" (renamed or possibly translated to Necronomicon Ex-Mortis in the sequels), a Sumerian Book of the Dead, along with a tape recorder. The tape is a recording made by the cabin's owner Professor Knowby, who was translating a passage of the book. By playing the tape, the group unknowingly awaken the Kandarian Demon (the titular "Evil Dead") which can possess the living. They are possessed and killed one by one, until only Ash remains. He finally destroys the Book of the Dead by throwing it in the fireplace, and in doing so causes the possessed bodies of Scott and Cheryl to rapidly decay and "die". The film ends with Ash being suddenly attacked by the evil force (originally intended to portray his death).

==== Evil Dead II (1987) ====
In an alternate recap of the previous film, only Ash and Linda are shown on the trip to the cabin. Picking up from the ending of the first film, Ash is carried off by the demonic force and briefly possessed, released from the spirit by the light of dawn and falling unconscious. Attempting to leave, Ash finds the only bridge out completely destroyed and is forced to spend another night in the cabin. As the evil force toys with Ash's mind, his right hand becomes possessed and he cuts it off at the wrist with his chainsaw.

Later, the cabin owner's daughter, Annie Knowby, and three others arrive to discover what became of Professor Knowby. Despite banding together in an attempt to survive, the others are killed off leaving only Ash and Annie. To better fight the deadites, Ash affixes the chainsaw in place of his right hand and wields a "boomstick" to match. Annie reads passages from the Necronomicon, first to force the Kandarian Demon to manifest physically, and then opening a space-time vortex to banish the now-corporeal demonic spirit. However, Annie is stabbed by Ash's possessed disembodied hand; succumbing to her wound, she is unable to close the vortex after the entity is sucked away. Ash is sucked into the vortex after the entity and sent back in time to 1300 AD Europe. After saving a group of knights from an attacking deadite, he is hailed as the hero "who has come from the sky"; Ash can only scream in anguish at his situation.

==== Army of Darkness (1992) ====
After being accidentally transported to medieval Europe, Ash must retrieve the Necronomicon so he can return home. Using his knowledge of modern technology, Ash constructs a mechanical prosthetic hand out of a gauntlet from a suit of armor. Bungling the magic words that will allow him to safely retrieve it, Ash unleashes an army of the dead led by his monstrous doppelganger "Bad Ash". After leading the medieval soldiers to victory, Ash is given a potion that will allow him to sleep until his own time. Back in the present, Ash returns to his job as a sales clerk at S-Mart; when the store is attacked by a deadite, he kills it and is again hailed as a hero.

In the original ending, a distracted Ash drinks one drop too many from the potion, awakening instead in post-apocalyptic London. The film then cuts to black as his insane laughter is heard.

==== Evil Dead (2013) ====
Ash makes an appearance in a post-credits scene, in which he says his signature catchphrase, "Groovy".

==== Evil Dead Rise (2023) ====
In 2023, Bruce Campbell appears in Evil Dead Rise in a cameo role as a priest heard translating the Necronomicon Ex-Mortis on a vinyl record (recorded in 1923) discovered by Danny, leading to Ellie's possession. In April 2023, the film's director Lee Cronin stated that Campbell's character in the film was one "that could very well be Ash Williams", displaced in time. Cronin later clarified it was indeed Ash, but neglected to elaborate how or why he had ended up in 1923.

=== Television ===
==== Ash vs Evil Dead ====
In 2015, an older Ash appears as the main character in Ash vs Evil Dead, a horror comedy series for Starz. In an interview with Entertainment Weekly, Campbell stated, "Ash has survivor's guilt. You could have a heyday with his PTSD. He's a war vet. He doesn't want to talk about it, and he'll lie about that stump on his hand to impress the ladies. This is a guy who's got some issues. He's emotionally stunted. But he's the guy you want in the foxhole next to you."

In the first season, with an attempt to impress a date, Ash accidentally releases the Kandarian Demon by reading from the Necronomicon while intoxicated. His former coworkers Pablo Bolivar and Kelly Maxwell join forces with him after their encounters with the Evil Dead. Ash eventually discovers that the key to dispelling the evil is returning the book to the cabin and bury it within its grounds.

At the cabin, the group is confronted by Ruby, an ancient being and the original author of Necronomicon. Ruby offers Ash a compromise: if he allows her to release her demonic children as well as lord over them, then she will not only spare Pablo and Kelly but also fulfill his dream of living a normal life with his friends in Jacksonville, Florida. Ash accepts, delighting in the idea of finally living a normal quiet life. As the trio drive off, a radio broadcast reveals mysterious sinkholes are erupting across the country.

In the second season, Ash's partying in Jacksonville is cut short when deadites show up. Declaring that Ruby has sent them, one calls him "Ashy Slashy". It is revealed that, after escaping from the cabin Ash had returned home, only for no one to believe him about the deadites. Instead believing that Ash had killed his sister and friends, they gave him the nickname "Ashy Slashy" and drove him out of town. Returning to Elk Grove to search for Ruby, Ash is reunited with his estranged father Brock who disowned him after Cheryl's death.

Ruby reveals that her children have betrayed her and attempted to take possession of the book themselves in order to summon a demon known as Baal; Ash and his friends form an alliance with Ruby to retrieve the Necronomicon and send the demon spawn back to hell. Reclaiming the book and throwing it into a portal to hell, the group unknowingly allows Baal to enter the mortal world.

After awakening in an asylum, Ash is confronted by a doctor (Baal in disguise) who tries to convince Ash that there were no demons but merely "delusions". As time goes on Ash appears to succumb to Baal's attempts, obeying commands to capture his former allies. However, it is revealed that Ash was merely playing along in order to gather the group to return Baal to hell; they succeed but Pablo is killed in the process.

Recalling previous adventures via time travel, Ash theorizes that it may be possible to bring Pablo back from the dead by going back in time to the cabin and preventing his younger self from ever finding the Necronomicon. Taken back into the past by Ruby, the group is confronted by Baal and a younger Ruby; when Ash finally defeats Baal the cabin is set ablaze and sinks into the depths of hell. The trio return to the present and the citizens of Elk Grove throw a parade in Ash's honor. In a grateful speech, Ash declares that he wants to stay in Elk Grove and defend the town if evil ever returns. A post credits scene reveals the Necronomicon on the cabin grounds, left behind by Ash.

In the third and final season, after the Necronomicon is once again found and read, the Evil Dead makes a return to Elk Grove. Ash reunites with former lover Candace Barr, and learns he has a daughter, Brandy. Ash, Pablo, and Kelly unite against the younger Ruby who plans to kill Ash and turn his long-lost daughter against him. Also introduced are the Knights of Sumeria, an ancient order dedicated to defeating the evil that worship Ash and his destiny to save mankind.

Entering through a dimensional rift, the Dark Ones take revenge on Ruby for imprisoning them millennia ago and reclaim the Necronomicon. With the Dark Ones now in the mortal realm, evil dead are summoned worldwide and a massive creature, Kandar the Destroyer, is unleashed. In Elk Grove, while military forces evacuate citizens, Ash decides to stay behind in order to finally fulfill his destiny of defeating the evil. After saying a heartfelt goodbye to his friends and daughter, Ash commandeers an abandoned tank and fires the Kandarian dagger into the head of Kandar, destroying the evil and saving the world.

Awakening from a coma in the far distant, technologically advanced future, Ash is told that the Dark Ones are on the move. The series ends with Ash saying his iconic line "Groovy" as he embarks on another quest to save the world.

=== Video games ===
In the 2000s, Bruce Campbell voiced Ash in a trilogy of video games. The first was Hail to the King, released in 2000 on PlayStation, Dreamcast, and Windows. This game continues after Army of Darkness. Ash is dating Jenny, a fellow S-Mart employee. After she convinces him to return to the cabin to face his fears, his severed hand replays the tape and sets the evil loose again. The second game, A Fistful of Boomstick, released in 2003 on Xbox and PlayStation 2. In this game Ash mentions Jenny died in a bus accident previous to this game. Ash watches TV in a bar in Dearborn, Michigan, where a local TV show, "Mysteries of the Occult", reads the passages from the Necronomicon setting the evil loose and possessing most of the town. The game also features time-travel, including colonial times and the civil war era. The third and final game was Evil Dead: Regeneration, released in 2005 on Xbox, PlayStation 2, and Windows. This game plays through an alternate history: instead of being sucked into the vortex at the end of Evil Dead II, Ash has been placed in a mental institution for the criminally insane. His doctor has gone mad and, having obtained the Necronomicon, releases the deadites once again.

Ash appears in Telltale Games' Poker Night 2, voiced by Danny Webber. The player participates in a poker tournament against Williams, Sam from Sam & Max, Claptrap from Borderlands, and Brock Samson from The Venture Bros. There is a special conversation in the game where if the player chooses to play in an Evil Dead-inspired room, GLaDOS (the game's dealer) will reveal that Ash is actually Brock's ancestor through time travel as Ash had slept with a woman whose family line Brock is a member of some time during his adventure in Army of Darkness. In another conversation between him and Brock, it is revealed that the store Ash previously worked for, S-Mart, is confirmed to exist in the Venture Bros. universe.

Ash Williams also makes an unofficial appearance as a player character in the run-and-gun platform game Broforce. In keeping with the game's naming convention, he is referred to as "Ash Brolliams". His weapon is a shotgun whose bullets shoot in three directions, and his melee and special is where he slices and dices enemies with his chainsaw hand.

A leak in the perk selection screen revealed that Ash would be added as a playable survivor in Dead by Daylight. He was officially announced alongside a trailer on March 28, 2019 and released on April 2 that same year.

Ash is playable in the indie video game Phantom Halls.

Ash is a playable character in the 2022 video game Evil Dead: The Game, appearing alongside characters and locations from throughout the franchise. He is portrayed in all of his incarnations throughout the series.

Ash was added to Fortnite as a skin for 2022's Fortnitemares event, first purchasable on October 23. His design was based on his appearance in Evil Dead II, and his accompanying bundle included the Necronomicon Ex-Mortis and his boomstick as back blings, and his chainsaw hand as a pickaxe.

Ash appears as a playable character in Call of Duty: Modern Warfare II, as well as the free-to-play Call of Duty: Warzone 2.0, as part of their sixth seasonal content update. His appearance is adapted from Evil Dead II.

Ash appears as a playable character in RetroRealms: Ash vs Evil Dead as well as being playable in RetroRealms: Halloween in a crossover appearance if both games are owned.

=== Comics ===
In 1992, Dark Horse Comics released a three-issue adaptation of Army of Darkness, adapted by John Bolton from Sam and Ivan Raimi's original script.

In 2004, Dynamite Entertainment acquired the rights to produce comics based on the Army of Darkness film, featuring Ash as the main character, starting with a four-issue miniseries titled Army of Darkness: Ashes 2 Ashes released in the fall of 2004. This miniseries later received two sequels (Army of Darkness: Shop 'Till You Drop Dead and Army of Darkness vs. Re-Animator, both released in 2005) which eventually turned into an ongoing series, and later more crossovers (most notably Marvel Zombies vs. The Army of Darkness and Freddy vs. Jason vs. Ash from 2007). These comics featured a version of Ash from a world where the events of the Evil Dead films didn't take place until the early 21st century, which was later designated by Marvel Comics as "Earth-818793" as part of their multiverse numbering system. In 2013, Dynamite announced a reboot of their Army of Darkness line titled "Ash And The Army of Darkness", which featured a new version of Ash Williams, one who chose to stay in the Middle Ages following an unexpected return to that time period. This rebooted series ran for eight issues, but was followed-up by two miniseries, Army of Darkness: Ash Gets Hitched, and Army of Darkness Volume 4 (better known as "Ash In Space") in 2014. Dynamite returned to their original "Earth-818793" version of Ash with 2016's Army of Darkness: Furious Road miniseries, but have since gone on to publish more crossovers with other licensed titles that are independent of this continuity (such as KISS/Army of Darkness and Vampirella/Army of Darkness). In 2019, Dynamite launched the crossover miniseries, Army of Darkness/Bubba Ho-Tep, seeing Ash team up with another Bruce Campbell character, Elvis.

In 2016, Space Goat Publishing released Evil Dead 2: Beyond Dead By Dawn, a three-issue series that, much like Dynamite's Army of Darkness books, took the liberty of stating that the events of the first two Evil Dead films took place in the 21st century. The series (and its several sequels and one-shot follow-ups) features a simulacrum clone of Ash Williams as the main character, which was created from the original Ash's right hand by Annie Knowby.

=== Other appearances ===
Shortly before the upcoming 2016 United States presidential election and the launch of the second season of Ash vs. Evil Dead, Starz and Bruce Campbell, as Ash Williams, recorded an "Ash4President" bid for presidency in 2016, complete with its own website for the faux campaign, promising to "Make America groovy again".

Ash appears non-canonically in the pornographic parody film Evil Head from 2012; in the parody, he is portrayed by Tommy Pistol, who won the 'Best Actor' award for the role at the 2014 AVN Award Show.

The character was featured at Halloween Horror Nights in 2009 and 2017, the latter at both the Florida and Hollywood events.

Ash (portrayed by Donal Thoms-Cappello) appeared through pre-recorded video scenes at Hourglass Escapes' The Official Evil Dead 2 Escape Room in Seattle, Washington beginning in 2019. As of 2026, this marks the first and only instance of Ash being portrayed by an actor other than Bruce Campbell for an officially licensed live-action filmed Evil Dead production.

== Concept and creation ==
According to Sam Raimi, Ash's name is a reference to his originally intended fate at the end of The Evil Dead, stating "that's all that was going to be left of him in the end." Campbell, however, suggested the name was short for "Ashley"; the character is also referred to as "Ashley" by his sister Cheryl in the original Evil Dead. When creating Army of Darkness, Raimi toyed with giving him the full name "Ashley J. Williams", which was later used by video games and comics involving the character. Campbell later confirmed in Cinefantastique that the full name was official. The Ash vs. Evil Dead episode "Unfinished Business" also reveals that his middle name is Joanna (though the Army of Darkness comics had previously given his middle name as "James" after his grandfather, a fictitious member of the Untouchables).

Bruce Campbell has stated Ash is incompetent at everything except fighting the Evil Dead. Campbell also added that Ash is "a bad slow thinker and a good fast thinker". He knows some degree of hand-to-hand combat techniques, and shows prowess with a variety of weapons in various situations. His main strength seems to be his ingenuity: although he is repeatedly noted in the audio commentaries for The Evil Dead and Evil Dead II for his stupidity and ignorance, he has from the second film on been shown creating such things ranging from his chainsaw bracket and shotgun harness, gunpowder from mainly referring to its elemental makeup in a chemistry book, a fully functional prosthetic hand from a metal gauntlet, and the short-lived "Deathcoaster".

His invention and ingenuity are further expanded on in the games: in Evil Dead: Regeneration, he creates fully functional weapons such as a flamethrower and a harpoon gun from spare parts that are merely lying about; and in Evil Dead: A Fistful of Boomstick, the inventiveness seems to run in Ash's family, as his blacksmith ancestor in the Colonial Dearborn level is quickly able to make a flamethrower and a Gatling gun from spare parts Ash finds for him, when Ash says those things "haven't even been invented yet". In the 1992 comic adaptation of Army of Darkness written by Sam and Ivan Raimi, Ash says that he has a degree in engineering from Michigan State University.

Ash's personality and state of mind change drastically throughout the franchise. In The Evil Dead and the beginning of Evil Dead II, he is something of a laid-back everyman, but by the middle of Evil Dead II and into Army of Darkness, he has grown into a much braver person, and becomes the voice of encouragement and confidence in Arthur's castle. It is at this point that Ash becomes known for his one-liners, and his personality takes on a more cynical, embittered tone. Raimi has said that he feels Ash's personality transformation in Darkness was very out of character.

== Characteristics ==
A possessed Ash in Evil Dead II. Demonic versions of Ash are a recurring theme throughout the Evil Dead series.

In The Evil Dead, Ash is portrayed as being incapable of dealing with the events around him. Over the course of the film, Ash gradually overcomes his fears and manages to fight off his possessed friends. He is shown to take his predicament very seriously in the first film, rather than in a comedic manner, as in the subsequent films. Evil Dead II portrays Ash as a braver character. Campbell commented that in the film Ash is more than capable at fighting off monsters. The character gradually became more of an antihero within Evil Dead II and its sequel, Army of Darkness. Ash's most defining characteristic is the chainsaw attached to his right arm, placed after cutting off his possessed hand in Evil Dead II.

Since Army of Darkness, Ash has been portrayed consistently as in Bruce Campbell's words "a guy who doesn't know anything, a big talker". Ash rarely takes situations seriously and is very incompetent as a hero or protagonist; He is often causing the conflict that drives the story forward rather than solving it while having a selfish, self-serving attitude towards others at the same time. In Ash vs. Evil Dead, many of his neighbors call him an "asshole" and complain about his narcissistic cocky attitude while his boss frequently hounds him for making up excuses for getting out of work. At the same time, Ash has been portrayed as a womanizer and in the television series has been shown to flat out lie and invent sympathetic anecdotes to sleep with women at local bars. Ash vs. Evil Dead reveals that his father Brock Williams was often overly competitive with him as a child and it seems that many of Ash's traits have originated from his father's behavior. Despite his immature conceited attitude, Ash has been shown to have a softer, more heroic side. In Army of Darkness he chooses to stay behind and help the people of Arthur's castle fight the deadite army despite having nothing to gain from doing so. Over the course of the television series, Ash bonds with Pablo and Kelly, at one point calling Kelly the "daughter he never had." He also shows regret and remorse when he is forced to kill his elderly neighbor when she becomes possessed and tries to kill him.

By the time of Ash vs. Evil Dead, decades after the original films, Ash has aged considerably; he now wears dentures, a "man girdle", and dyes his hair. According to Bruce Campbell, "we're milking the age thing now. He was the wrong guy thirty-five years ago, and now he's really the wrong guy for the job and that made it an interesting character to play".

In the films, Ash has fought with several demonic depictions of himself, referred to in Army of Darkness as "Bad Ash", and also as "Evil Ash" by fans. The first illusion was in Evil Dead II, where Ash experiences a hallucination wherein his reflection torments him over dismembering his girlfriend Linda with a chainsaw, and proceeds to choke him, only for Ash to realize he is choking himself. The second appearance was as a clone in Army of Darkness, becoming "Bad Ash". Ash seemingly kills his clone and buries him, but "Bad Ash" is revived after Ash incorrectly recites the Necronomicon incantations. Bad Ash later leads the Army to Arthur's castle to retrieve the Necronomicon, even corrupting Ash's then-love interest Sheila. He battles "Good Ash" for the Necronomicon, gets burned with a torch, and continues fighting as a skeleton. Finally, Ash cuts off Bad Ash's right hand and catapults him into the sky on a lit sack of gunpowder, which then explodes.

A new version of Bad Ash appears in the TV series Ash vs Evil Dead, spawned from Ash's severed hand from Evil Dead II. While essentially the same character, it has more in common with Ash in terms of personality, and even sharing old injuries and ailments which Ash uses to his advantage during their fight. Rather than being overtly evil and openly hostile, it is more subtle and comes across as a psychopath, being friendly and flirty towards Amanda at first but becomes unstable and aggressive when she rejects him. It appears in the third season of the show; born as an infant (but demonstrating superhuman abilities), it soon grows to again resemble the adult Ash. In contrast to the independence of other incarnations, this one is noticeably subservient to its creator, Ruby.

== Reception ==
Ash ranked eleventh on UGO.com's Top 100 Heroes of All Time list, describing him as "an egomaniacal, complaining, misogynistic goon", but also the best "demon and zombie killer ever to be portrayed on the silver screen". They additionally praised the character for his humility at the conclusion of Army of Darkness, in returning to his own time. Empire ranked him the 24th Greatest Movie Character on their list of 100, calling him a "truly iconic horror hero", and a "delirious, delicious, dimwitted" parody of action heroes. He was also ranked number 77 on Fandomania's list of the 100 Greatest Fictional Characters.

The Evil Dead films and the character of Ash influenced many 1990s first-person shooters such as Doom, Duke Nukem 3D, and Blood. Duke Nukem quotes so many lines from Ash that Bruce Campbell stated that he was angered by not being paid for them.

Another notable video game character influenced by Ash is Alisa Bosconovitch. Speaking on Alisa's creation, Tekken project director and chief producer Katsuhiro Harada explained, "Alisa was something we created based on internal staff feedback. We really wanted a character with chainsaws on her arms [...] I'm a huge fan of Sam Raimi's Evil Dead."
