= Hit It Rich! =

2013 mobile casino video game

Zynga Hit It Rich!
- Developer: Zynga
- Publisher: Zynga
- Platforms: Facebook, iOS, Android
- Release: July 13, 2013
- Genre: Social network game

Hit It Rich! is a social network casino game developed by Zynga and available on Facebook. Hit it Rich is a freemium game, meaning that it is free to play, but players have the option of purchasing extra features.

An iOS version of Hit it Rich was released and an additional version was launched on Google Play for Android devices. Players are able to carry progress from the web version of the game to mobile. The game is part of the larger Zynga Casino franchise, which was revealed in an October 2011 event called "Unleashed." It was developed by Spooky Cool Labs, which Zynga acquired in June 2013, for the purpose of creating social casino games.

In February 2014, Hit it Rich was the most downloaded free game on the iPad's "casino" category.

== Features and gameplay ==
Hit It Rich! is a social casino game that simulates slot machine gameplay using virtual currency. The game includes multiple five-reel slot machines with varying betting limits and numbers of paylines, some of which are themed after licensed media properties and other Zynga titles.

Gameplay progression is based on experience points earned through betting activity. Players advance through predefined levels that unlock higher maximum bet limits, alongside a loyalty point system tied to gameplay activity. Bonus rounds are triggered by specific symbol combinations. The game also includes tournament modes, achievement tracking, and social features enabled through Facebook integration, allowing players to compare progress and interact with others. The game is available in several languages, including Dutch, English, French, German, Portuguese, Spanish, and Turkish.
