= Army of Darkness (comics) =

Comics published by Dark Horse Comics

- Cover of Army of Darkness vol. 1, #1 (Nov. 1992), art by John Bolton

Publication information
- Publisher: Dark Horse Comics; Dynamite Entertainment
- Schedule: Monthly
- Formats: Original material for the series has been published as a set of limited series and one-shot comics.
- Publication date: November 1992 – present

Reprints
- Collected editions
- Omnibus Volume 1: ISBN 1-60690-100-1

Army of Darkness comics are based on the film of the same name, originally published by Dark Horse Comics and later by Dynamite Entertainment (initially through Devil's Due Publishing).

The stories follow the adventures of the Evil Dead series, Ash Williams, and has included a number of crossovers with a wide variety of characters such as Marvel Zombies, Darkman, Freddy Krueger, Jason Voorhees, Dracula, Xena, Danger Girl, and Re-Animator.

== Dark Horse Comics (1992–1993) ==
The first comic based on the Army of Darkness film (and Evil Dead franchise as a whole) was the three-issue adaptation of Army of Darkness published by Dark Horse Comics written by Sam Raimi and Ivan Raimi, featuring artwork by John Bolton. The series began releasing in 1992, however, due to the delayed release of the Army of Darkness film (a result of a lawsuit between Universal Pictures and Dino De Laurentiis regarding the rights to the character Hannibal Lecter), the third and final issue was not released until October 1993. Dark Horse International reprinted the series in issues #1–8 in the short-lived United Kingdom-exclusive anthology magazine Total Carnage in 1993.

This series has been reprinted several times following Dynamite Entertainment's acquisition of the Army of Darkness comic rights, including a paperback in 2006 and a "30th anniversary" hardcover in 2023. It was also included in Dynamite's first Army of Darkness Omnibus trade paperback collection in 2010.

== Dynamite Entertainment (2004–present) ==
In 2004, Dynamite Entertainment launched their own series of officially licensed comics based on the Army of Darkness film, starting with a four-issue miniseries entitled Army of Darkness: Ashes 2 Ashes (which was co-published with Devil's Due Publishing for its initial release). Since 2004, Dynamite has steadily published Army of Darkness comics through miniseries, one-shots, crossovers, and three ongoing volumes.

=== Limited series ===
Title	Issues	Description	Notes
Army of Darkness: Ashes 2 Ashes (2004)	#1–4	Set immediately after the events of the Army of Darkness film, Ash Williams and the Wise Man of 1300 AD set out on a quest to destroy the Necronomicon once and for all, leading to a showdown with Evil Ash and his new Deadite legion in Egypt.	Co-published with Devil's Due Publishing.; Issue #1 was re-released as a one-shot entitled Army of Darkness: Ashes 2 Ashes Director's Cut, which included concept art and the issue's script.; Reprinted in Army of Darkness Omnibus Volume 1.
Army of Darkness: Shop Till You Drop Dead (2005)	#1–4	A sequel to the Ashes 2 Ashes series, Ash Williams and his coworkers battle evil in the aisles of S-Mart, and sees Ash briefly thrown into the futuristic world of 2501 AD.	Co-published with Devil's Due Publishing.; Reprinted in Army of Darkness Omnibus Volume 1.
Army of Darkness: Ash Saves Obama (2009)	#1–4	When President Barack Obama purchases a comic book variant of the Necronomicon from a Detroit comic convention, Ash Williams battles evil from Los Angeles to Washington, D.C. in the hopes to get the book out of President Obama's hands.	
Ash and The Army of Darkness (2013)	#1–8	A reboot of the Army of Darkness comic line sees Ash thrown back to 1300 AD, where he discovers the Necronomicon has corrupted The Wise Man and raised a new army of the dead.	
Army of Darkness: Ash Gets Hitched (2014)	#1–4	The direct sequel to Ash and The Army of Darkness has Ash Williams battle the first Deadite, a behemoth known as "The Faceless Man", in the days leading up to his wedding to Sheila.	
Army of Darkness: Furious Road (2016)	#1–6	A follow-up to the Ash vs. The Classic Monsters story from Dynamite's first ongoing Army of Darkness series, Ash Williams (now a middle-aged man in his late 50s) sets out to save the post-apocalyptic world with a team of monsters led by Eva, The Daughter of Dracula.	
Ash vs. The Army of Darkness (2017)	#0–5	A self-contained story set immediately after the Army of Darkness film sees Ash working in a Michigan high school after learning someone is distributing pages of the Necronomicon to students, and discovers the existence of a secret military organization that has long-awaited Ash's return.	
Death to the Army of Darkness (2020)	#1–5	In trying to rid the curse of being plagued by evil, several aspects of Ash's personality are separated from his body and given forms of their own. Referred to as "Team Ash", the group land in ancient Egypt in the days when Deadites terrorized the land and The Dark Ones were creating the Necronomicon.	
The Army of Darkness: 1979 (2021)	#1–5	Ash Williams is teleported back in time to New York City circa 1979, where he encounters the city's colorful street gangs as he tries to get the Necronomicon out of the hands of a group called The Warlocks.	
Army of Darkness Forever (2023)	#1–13	A series following both the Theatrical and Director's Cut ending of the Army of Darkness film. Ash Williams wakes up in post-apocalyptic London of 2093, while Evil Ash poses as his human counterpart in 1993.	

=== Ongoing series ===
==== First ongoing (2006–2007) ====
Storyline	Issues	Description	Notes
Old School	#5–7	Ash and Sugarbaby return to the cabin in the woods with the intention of destroying the Deadites' "anchor" to the world of the living.	Continued from the numbering of Army of Darkness vs. Re-Animator (2005).; Reprinted in Army of Darkness Omnibus Volume 1.
Ash vs. The Classic Monsters	#8-11	Ash and Sugarbaby go to New York City after hearing rumors of a "Vampire virus" sweeping across the city, and learn that Dracula and his legion of monsters are invading.	Originally titled "Ash vs. Dracula" during its initial release.; Reprinted in Army of Darkness Omnibus Volume 2.
The Death of Ash	#12–13	Back in Detroit, Ash is lured to a fast food restaurant emitting strong traces of supernatural activity, only to discover that it is a trap centuries in the making, all orchestrated by Sheila's evil clone. Ash's soul is expelled from his body, and Evil Ash takes control.	Reprinted in Army of Darkness Omnibus Volume 2.

==== Second ongoing (2007–2010) ====
Storyline	Issues	Description	Notes
From the Ashes	#1–4	The direct sequel to Marvel Zombies vs. Army of Darkness sees Ash return to his proper universe, only to discover Evil Ash has turned the world into a Deadite wasteland. With the help of the mutants who now live in this post-apocalyptic landscape, Ash confronts his demonic double in a Detroit high-rise and saves Sheila.	Reprinted in Army of Darkness Omnibus Volume 2.
The Long Road Home	#5–8	After Evil Ash's defeat, Ash and Sheila set out to explore this strange wasteland, only to quickly be captured by mutants. After escaping a twisted game of Football orchestrated by the mysterious "Boss Man", Ash returns to the arena to save Sheila and battle the Four Horsemen of The Apocalypse.	Reprinted in Army of Darkness Omnibus Volume 2.
Home Sweet Hell	#9–12	With the world reset to its pre-apocalyptic state, Sheila discovers Ash has erased his memory of his deeds as "The Chosen One", turning him into a geeky stockboy, which has also made him a target for the physical avatars of the Seven Deadly Sins. Reunited with those who had died to evil in the past, Sheila sets out to save Ash and make him remember who he truly is.	Reprinted in Army of Darkness Omnibus Volume 2.
King for a Day	#13	Returning to 1300 AD, Ash and Sheila discover that Ash has been made the king of Lord Arthur's kingdom following Arthur and Henry The Red's death. However, the medieval dead summoned by the Necronomicon do not take this news lightly, and rise to destroy Ash before his formal ascension to the throne.	Reprinted in Army of Darkness Omnibus Volume 3.
Hellbillies and Deadnecks	#14–17	Returning to the 21st Century alone, Ash begins to take his "Chosen One" responsibilities a bit more seriously, and decides to isolate himself in the mountains of Colorado and bury the Necronomicon. Using its evil-infused blood, the Necronomicon contaminates a nearby river and turns an entire skiing resort town into Deadites.	Reprinted in Army of Darkness Omnibus Volume 3.
Montezuma's Revenge	#18	Ash is summoned to Mexico to battle the undead Montezuma.	Reprinted in Army of Darkness Omnibus Volume 3.
Water, Water, Everywhere...	#19	In the aftermath of Hellbillies and Deadnecks, Ash discovers a shipment of evil-infused water has made its way to West Virginia. While working at the warehouse where the water is being held, Ash discovers that many of his co-workers are vanishing, no thanks to his new girlfriend Georgia, who reveals herself to be a succubus.	Reprinted in Army of Darkness Omnibus Volume 3.
League of Light, Assemble!	#20–27	History begins to repeat itself when Ash is possessed by the demonic spirit known as Hell's Prophet. To combat the growing supernatural activity across the globe, Ash and a werewolf begin to assemble "The League of Light", a team of unique individuals from the seven continents of the world whose ancestors had battled Hell's Prophet in the 19th Century.	Reprinted in Army of Darkness Omnibus Volume 3.

==== Third ongoing (2012–2013) ====
Issues	Description	Notes
	#1–13	After hopping from universe to universe, Ashley K. Williams discovers her male counterpart, Ashley J. Williams, and seeks him out in the hopes to learn about the powers granted to her by The Dark Ones. Shortly after crossing paths in the jungles of Brazil, the pair of Ashes are separated once more, with Ashley J. getting sent to Japan circa 1979, and Ashley K. ending up in Hell. Ashley J. Williams ends up in Chicago in 1929, where he avenges his grandfather's death at the hands of gangsters in possession of the Necronomicon, though he eventually returns to the 21st Century, where Montezuma and The Dark Ones wait to enact their revenge by using Ashley K. as their secret weapon.

==== Fourth ongoing (2014–2015) ====
Storyline	Issues	Description	Notes
Ash in Space	#1–5	Following the events of the Army of Darkness: Ash Gets Hitched series and the Army of Darkness #1992.1 one-shot, Ash Williams takes his battle against the Deadites to the stars when the Necronomicon is sent to the International Space Station, where its evil has infected the station's AI computer system. Ash and what crew of the station remains battle a robotic Evil Ash before the Deadites can infect a super-satellite that will broadcast their evil incantations across the globe.	

=== One-shots ===
Title	Description	Notes
Tales of Army of Darkness (2006)	Anthology comic containing six short stories about Ash Williams.	Reprinted in Army of Darkness Omnibus Volume 1.
Army of Darkness: Ash's Christmas Horror (2008)	A grumpy Ash Williams is teleported into the worlds of various Christmas movies and television specials after refusing to dress as Santa Claus at S-Mart.	
Army of Darkness: Convention Invasion (2014)	Ash is recruited by a group of teenagers to investigate a Necronomicon sighting at a New York City comic book convention, leading to a showdown with a wizard, a giant skeleton fish, and Evil Ash.	
Ash and the Army of Darkness Annual (2014)	After the events of the Ash and The Army of Darkness series, Ash must go on a quest across time in order to retrieve pieces of his soul from three Deadite witches.	
Army of Darkness #1992.1 (2014)	Anthology comic containing five short stories about Ash Williams.	The Ash in Space Prelude short story was reprinted in the Army of Darkness: Ash In Space trade paperback.
Army of Darkness: Election Special (2016)	Ash Williams hits the campaign trail after learning that a spirit known as "The Great Darkness" has possessed one of the candidates for the upcoming presidential election.	
Army of Darkness: Halloween Special (2018)	Anthology comic containing two stories about Ash Williams' exploits on Halloween, including a story set in the continuity of the Ash vs. The Army of Darkness series.	
The Army of Darkness: Ash the Author (2019)	Wanting to capitalize on his battles against evil, Ash writes a book about his adventure in the Middle Ages. While promoting his book in New York City, Ash encounters a fan who presents him with the Necronomicon, prompting Ash to battle the evil unleashed in the store.	Digital exclusive release.

=== Crossovers ===
Title	Issues	Description	Notes
Army of Darkness vs. Re-Animator (2005)	#1–4	In the aftermath of Army of Darkness: Shop Till You Drop Dead, Ash Williams is arrested and placed in the care of Herbert West at Arkham Asylum, and battles Wilbur Whateley, Evil Ash, and The Great Old Ones.	
Darkman vs. Army of Darkness (2006)	#1–4	Following the events of Darkman III and Army of Darkness, Ash Williams is summoned to Los Angeles after the Necronomicon turns Julie Hastings into the Deadite Queen. Ash teams-up with Peyton "Darkman" Westlake to battle the Deadites the undead Robert G. Durant and the legion of Deadites.	
Marvel Zombies vs. Army of Darkness (2007)	#1–5	Having been killed by his evil doppelganger during the Death of Ash story (in the first ongoing Army of Darkness series), Ash is teleported a version of the Marvel Universe right before a virus turns Earth's mightiest heroes into flesh-hungry monsters. Ash teams-up with what heroes remain on a search for the Necronomicon, believing the book to be the cause of the zombie outbreak.	Co-published with Marvel Comics.
Freddy vs. Jason vs. Ash (2008)	#1–6	Five years after the events of the Freddy vs. Jason film, Ash Williams is transferred to the new Forest Green (formerly Crystal Lake) S-Mart, where he crosses paths with Freddy Krueger and Jason Voorhees while on a mission to recover the Necronomicon.	Co-published by WildStorm Productions (DC Comics).
Army of Darkness/Xena: Warrior Princess (2008)	#1–4	Ash Williams is sent back in time to the age in which Xena walked the Earth after learning that one of his miniature doppelgangers from 1300 AD escaped the windmill, and used his 21st Century knowledge (as well as his own miniature copy of the Necronomicon) to terrorize the past.	This series was later released in trade paperback under the title of Army of Darkness/Xena: Warrior Princess Volume 1: Why Not?; Reprinted in the Army of Darkness/Xena: Warrior Princess Omnibus.
Xena: Warrior Princess/Army of Darkness (2008)	#1–4	Set immediately after the first crossover, Xena, Gabrielle, and Autolycus arrive in the 21st Century to battle the Deadites with Ash, and are accidentally thrown into the world of various famous books. After escaping these worlds of fiction, the four discover Ash's actions in Xena's native time (in the first crossover) have drastically changed the future for the worst.	This series was later released in trade paperback under the title of Xena: Warrior Princess/Army of Darkness Volume 2: What, Again?; Reprinted in the Army of Darkness/Xena: Warrior Princess Omnibus.
Freddy vs. Jason vs. Ash: The Nightmare Warriors (2009)	#1–6	Six months after the first Freddy vs. Jason vs. Ash series, Ash leads a team of survivors from Freddy and Jason's past to take on the slashers after Freddy is resurrected by the United States Government.	Co-published by WildStorm Productions (DC Comics).
Danger Girl and The Army of Darkness (2011)	#1–6	When a ruthless dictator gets his hands on the Necronomicon, the Danger Girl team recruits Ash Williams to help take on the Hammer Empire's Deadite army.	Co-published with IDW Publishing.
Prophecy (2012)	#1–7	Red Sonja follows Kulan Gath across time to the 21st Century, where he plans to see to it that the Mayan Doomsday Prophecy comes to pass.	Ash does not appear in this series until the fourth issue.
Army of Darkness vs. Hack/Slash (2013)	#1–6	Six months after the events of Hack/Slash (Volume 2) #25, Cassie Hack is called into action once more when the Black Lamp Society begins to gather pages of the Necronomicon and targets her family. Cassie joins forces with Ash Williams for a cross-country monster hunt and a trip through time.	
Army of Darkness/Reanimator (2013)	One-Shot	A sequel to Army of Darkness vs. Re-Animator and Prophecy, Ash is pulled back in time to 1922, where a more sinister Herbert West has been performing his experiments.	
Vampirella/Army of Darkness (2015)	#1–4	Vampirella is transported back in time to 1300 AD, in the days leading up to Evil Ash's siege on Lord Arthur's castle. Forming an alliance with Ash, Vampirella helps fight a group of demons posing as angles.	
Army of Darkness/Xena: Warrior Princess: Forever... and a Day (2016)	#1–6	Ash gets teleported to various pivotal points in Xena's personal timeline as he tries to make his way to help her during her final battle.	Reprinted in the Army of Darkness/Xena: Warrior Princess Omnibus.
KISS/Army of Darkness (2018)	#1–5	When history is altered by the mysterious disappearance of the rock band Kiss, an inexperienced Ash Williams is transported to 1300 AD after the Deadites have conquered the land, where he teams-up with the missing super-powered rockers.	
Army of Darkness/Bubba Ho-Tep (2019)	#1–4	Several months after the events of Bubba Ho-Tep, Ash Williams heads to Texas to investigate the man claiming to be Elvis Presley who battled a mummy. After verifying the man's claim, Ash's meeting with "The King" is cut short when Bubba is resurrected and sends Ash back in time to the 1970s.	Co-published with IDW Publishing.; This series is a crossover with Joe R. Lansdale's original Bubba Ho-Tep short story, the 2002 film, and IDW's Bubba Ho-Tep and The Cosmic Bloodsuckers comic.
Die!Namite Lives (2021)	#1–5	The sequel to the first Die!Namite series has Ash trapped inside an S-Mart warehouse as a zombie apocalypse unfolds outside. A team of monsters and superheroes enter the warehouse looking for the Necronomicon, though Ash is reluctant to hand it over.	
The Army of Darkness Versus Reanimator: Necronomicon Rising (2022)	#1–5	A stand-alone series unrelated to the first two crossovers sees Herbert West experiment on the recently unearthed severed head of Evil Ash. After Evil Ash helps Herbert West recover the Necronomicon, Ash Williams ends up in a futuristic world ruled by Dr. West, who has defeated death.	

== Collected editions ==
The various stories and limited series have been collected into trade paperbacks.

Dynamite are also collecting all the comics into larger omnibus editions:

- Omnibus Volume 1 (collects the first 18 issues: the 1992 3-issue film adaptation, Army of Darkness: Ashes 2 Ashes #1–4, Army of Darkness: Shop till You Drop Dead #1–4, Army of Darkness vs. Re-Animator #1–4, Army of Darkness (2006 series) #5–7, plus all 6 stories from Tales of Army of Darkness, 488 pages, released in 2010, ISBN 978-1-60690-100-7)
- Omnibus Volume 2 (collects the next 18 issues: Army of Darkness (2006 series) #8–13 and Army of Darkness (2007 series) #1-12, 432 pages, released in April 2012, ISBN 978-1-60690-274-5)
- Omnibus Volume 3 (collects the next 15 issues: Army of Darkness (2007 series) #13–27, 360 pages, released in April 2013, ISBN 978-1-60690-397-1)

Additionally, there is Army of Darkness/Xena Omnibus (collects Army of Darkness/Xena: Why Not (2008) #1–4, Xena vs. Army of Darkness: What...Again? (2008) #1–4, and Army of Darkness/Xena: Forever and a Day (2016) #1–6, 208 pages, released in June 2021, ISBN 978-152411-507-4)

== Awards ==
- 2006: Won the "Best Screen-To-Comic Adaptation" Spike TV Scream Award
- 2008: Nominated for the "Best Scream-To-Comic-Adaptation" Spike TV Scream Award

== Maquette ==
On May 11, 2005, it was announced that Dynamite Entertainment would be releasing a maquette based on J. Scott Campbell's cover of Army of Darkness: Ashes 2 Ashes #1. The maquette was sculpted by Anthony Colella and stands at 13” tall. It has a limited release of 150 pieces with 50 Artist Proofs being released at a later date. When released both the Maquette and AP held an MSRP of $149.99.

== See also ==
- List of comics based on films
