= Evil Dead The Musical =

Rock musical stage play

Evil Dead: The Musical
- Original Off-Broadway cast album cover
- Music: Frank Cipolla; Christopher Bond; Melissa Morris; George Reinblatt
- Lyrics: George Reinblatt
- Book: George Reinblatt
- Basis: Evil Dead by Sam Raimi
- Productions: 2003 Toronto; 2004 Montreal; 2006 Off-Broadway; 2007 Toronto; 2008 Seoul; 2009 Tokyo; 2012 Las Vegas; 2012 Madrid; 2013 Toronto; 2014 North American tour; 2016 Toronto; 2017 Seoul; 2017 North American tour; 2024 Perth; 2024 Sweden; 2024 Toronto; 2026 Linz; 2026 Australian tour; 2026 German tour; 2026 Toronto

Evil Dead: The Musical is a rock musical based on the Evil Dead franchise. First performed on stage in 2003 at the Tranzac club in Toronto, Ontario, the show instantly became a hit and eventually moved on to an off-Broadway run in 2006 at the New World Stages. Many regional productions of the show have been performed all over the world. Critics praised the show and one critic for The New York Times even hailed the musical as "the next The Rocky Horror Show".

== Plot ==
Five college students spend the weekend in an abandoned cabin in the woods, accidentally unleashing an evil terror. In this comedic take on the 1980s horror franchise, characters and demons sing and dance to songs written specifically for the musical. And, as in the films, Ash is there to dish out his various one-liners and fight the neverending demons.

The musical takes creative liberty with the plot line of the movies, mixing together the characters and concepts of all three, as well as changing sequences for the sake of the stage and comedic intent. Roughly, the first act adapts the original The Evil Dead while the second act adapts Evil Dead II.

== Productions ==
With the approval of both Sam Raimi and Bruce Campbell, the show was first staged as a workshop in Toronto in August 2003. The same team remounted the musical in Toronto that October for an additional three weeks. The show was presented in July 2004 at the 22nd Just for Laughs Comedy Festival in Montreal.

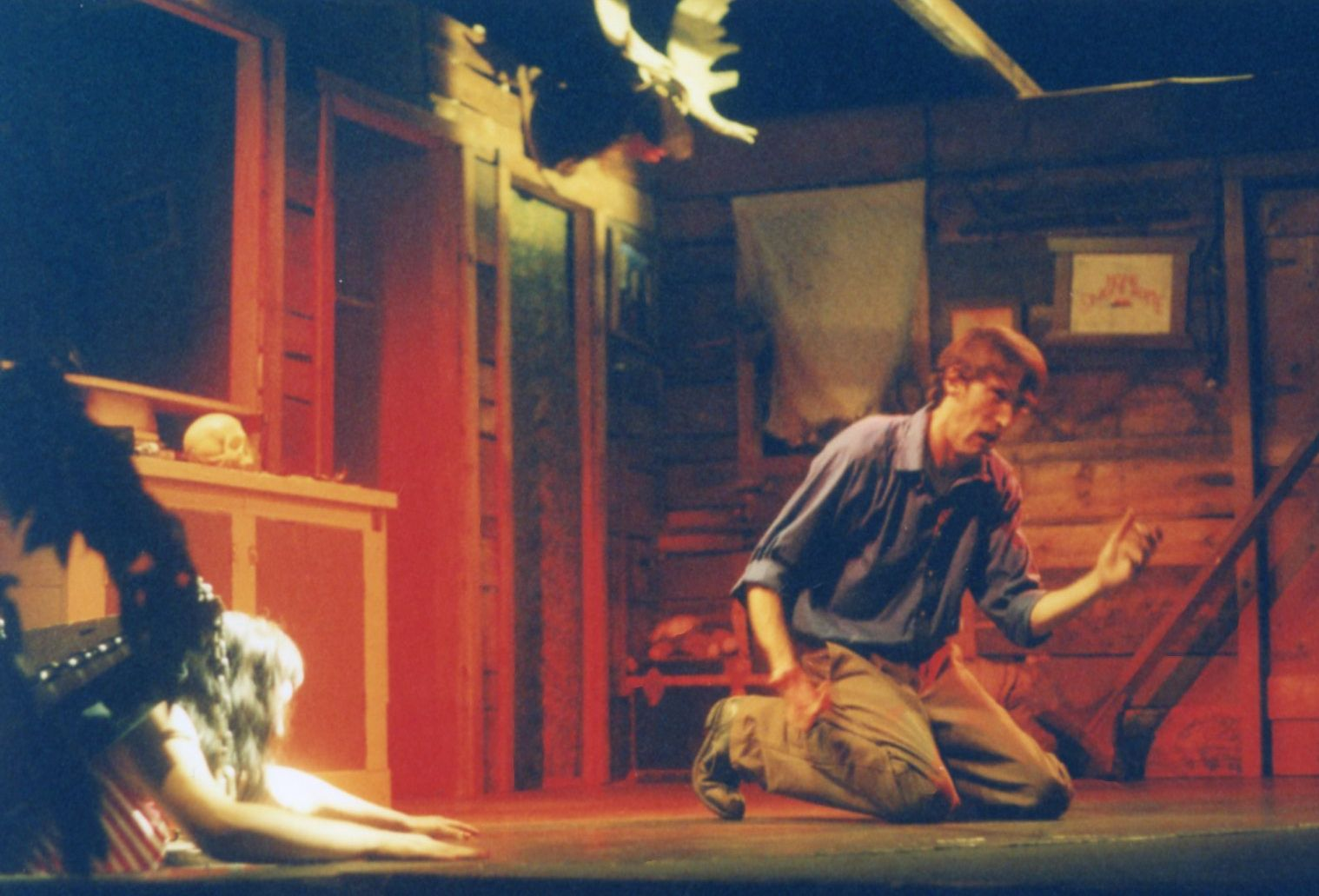
Media Premiere of Evil Dead The Musical, Tranzac Theatre, Toronto, August 13, 2003

During the Northeast Blackout of 2003, the indefatigable cast and crew performed the show on the front lawn of the Tranzac club in Toronto. The band played acoustic instruments and cast members provided sound effects from backstage. As the evening wore on, flashlights and car headlights were used to illuminate the actors.

=== Off-Broadway ===
The New York off-Broadway production started previews on October 2, 2006. The Official Opening Night performance was November 1, 2006, and it ran, performing eight times per week at the New World Stages, until February 17, 2007. The cast album debuted at #4 on the Billboard Show Charts. The off-Broadway production was co-directed by Christopher Bond and Tony winner and Buffy alum, Hinton Battle. Make-up and special FX were created by Louis Zakarian, whose film credits include Requiem for a Dream, Dogma and Romeo + Juliet. The cast was as follows:

- Ash: Ryan Ward
- Cheryl: Jenna Coker
- Annie/Shelly: Renee Klapmeyer
- Jake: Darryl Winslow
- Scott: Brandon Wardell
- Linda: Jennifer Byrne
- Ed/Moose: Tom Walker

=== Toronto revival productions ===
Evil Dead returned to Toronto, again starring Ryan Ward as Ash, at the Diesel Playhouse starting May 1, 2007. While the initial run was only to last until the end of June 2007, it was extended to August 4, 2007, September 8, 2007, June 26, 2008, and finally until September 6, 2008. It celebrated its 300th performance on June 26, 2008, which marked it as the longest running Canadian production in Toronto in 20 years. It won the Dora Audience Choice Award and praise by the Toronto Star.

A 20th anniversary production ran at the Randolph Theatre from October 5, 2024 to January 5, 2025, starring Aaron Robinson as Ash, Aimée Tremblay Woodman as Cheryl, Pascale Behrman as Annie/Shelly, Duncan Lang as Jake, Jean Blandon as Scott, Kendra Marie Brophy as Linda, Charlie Clements as Ed/Moose, David Fox as Fake Shemp/Male Swing, and Taryn Wichenko as Female Swing.

== Subsequent productions ==
More than 300 productions of Evil Dead The Musical have been staged by professional, amateur, and school theatre groups across North America and in many countries around the world, including Australia, Austria, Germany, Japan, South Korea, Spain, and Sweden.

=== Ultimate 4D Experience ===
On June 22, 2012, Sirc Michaels Productions brought the show to the Las Vegas Strip as a resident, open-ended production at the V Theater. The production is now officially the longest running production in the history of the show.

Due to the nature of the show, including the addition of a 100-seat splatter zone, audience interaction, multi-media elements, and state-of-the-art effects, lights, and sound, the name was altered slightly to include "Ultimate 4D Experience" to reflect production and design elements that separate the production from other stagings of the show.

The show moved to the Tommy Wind Theater on December 1, 2015, and to the Windows Showroom at Bally's on September 15, 2017.

=== North American tour (2014–2015) ===
The first North American tour was primarily cast out of Chicago, Illinois. It spent four weeks rehearsing there before it opened in Madison, Wisconsin (09/11/14). It then toured to Austin, Texas before returning to Chicago for a three-week engagement at the Broadway Playhouse. The cities on the tour schedule included Sandusky (OH), Fort Wayne (IN), Effingham (IL), Nashville (TN), Cleveland (OH), Greenvale (NY), Hartford (CT), Schenectady (NY), Hamilton (ON), Toronto (ON), Charlotte (NC), Tampa (FL), Sarasota (FL), Fort Lauderdale (FL), Newark (NJ), York (PA), Mesa (AZ), and Dayton (OH).

This production was produced by Starvox Entertainment and directed by Christopher Bond. It was choreographed by Stacey Rene Maroske and assistant choreographed by Corinne Giannotta. Musical directed by Aaron Eyre and fight choreography by Kevin Robinson. This production was stage managed by Phoebe Harper. The cast was as follows:

- Ash: David Sajewich
- Cheryl: Demi Zaino
- Annie/Shelly: Callie Johnson
- Jake: Andrew Di Rosa
- Scott: Creg Sclavi
- Linda: Julie Baird
- Ed/Moose: Ryan McBride
- Shemp/Male Swing: Ryan Czerwonko
- Female Swing/ Dance Captain: Jessica Kingsdale

There have been three successful North American tours since this time.

=== High School Versions ===
The first high school production of the musical was staged at Burlington Central High School in Burlington, ON. This production first premiered on November 23, 2011.

Licensing rights for a high school version of Evil Dead The Musical with "none of the swearing, all of the blood" were made available by Dramatic Publishing Company following a world-premiere production at Stagedoor Manor in Loch Sheldrake, New York in the Jack Romano Playhouse on July 28, 2017. The performance was executive produced by the Samuelson/Samen family, under the guidance of Director of Theatrical Programming Chris Armbrister, directed by Rob Scharlow, musical direction by James Mablin, choreography by Madeline Shaffer, and stage management by Hannah Delmore.

=== Additional regional productions ===
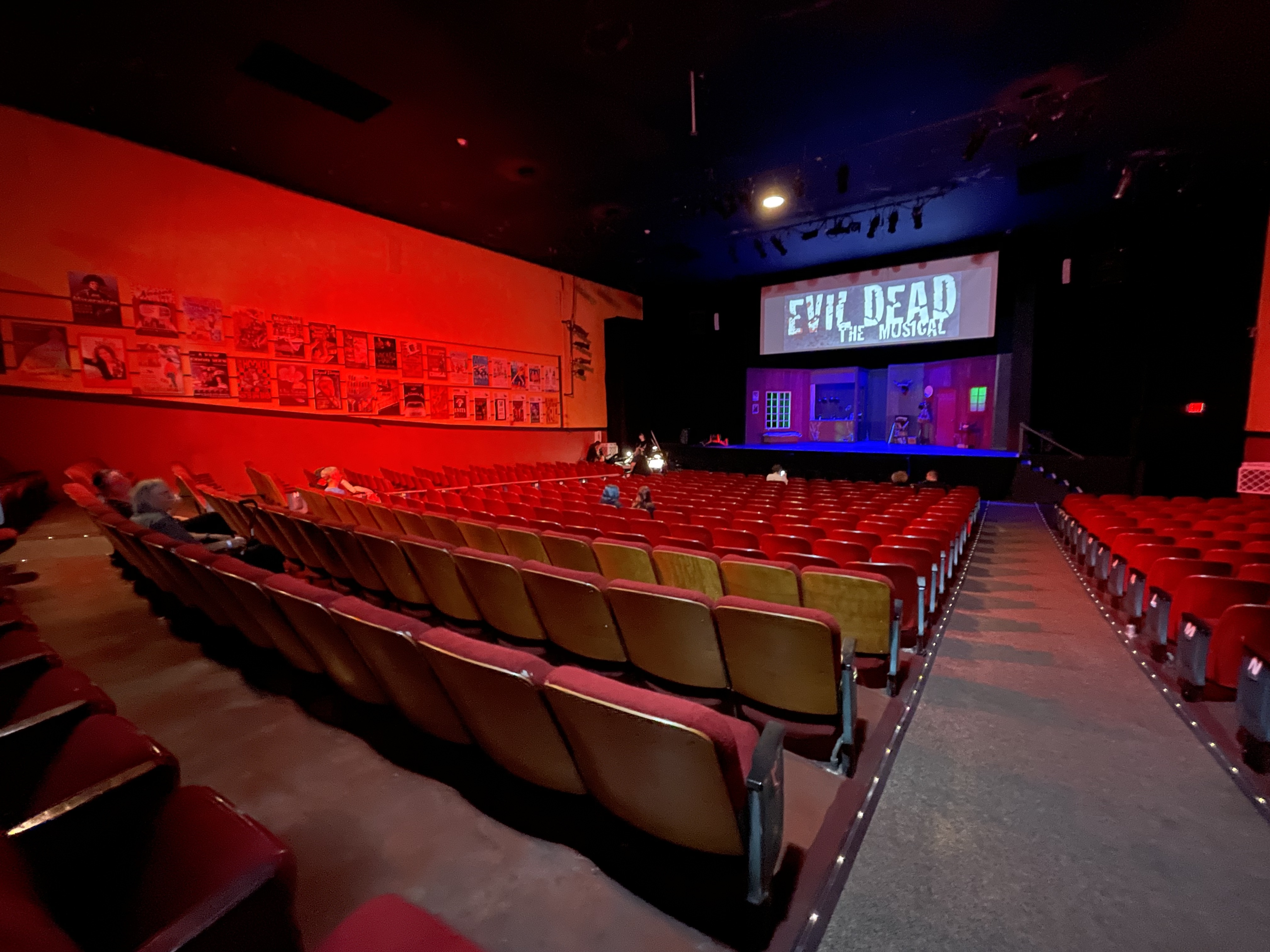
The stage is set for the Evil Dead The Musical at the Raven Performing Arts Theater in Healdsburg, California, in 2022.

From October 13–31, 2011, Off-Strip Productions and RagTag Entertainment teamed up to present the Sin City premiere of the show. It was presented at The Onyx Theatre and was helmed by Sirc Michaels. The show received rave reviews from critics and fans alike, and as such the production was brought back to Las Vegas for another successful run in January 2012.

Evil Dead The Musical opened in Oshawa, ON, Canada on February 1, 2019. The production had a successful initial run in October 2017 (for only six performances). The new production was produced by the Mansfield's Cabaret in downtown Oshawa. After 13 weeks, and becoming Oshawa's longest-running musical to ever play the city, the production closed on April 27, 2019. The Oshawa producers were preparing to open a brand-new production, which was to boast a revamped design and enhanced special effects, in April 2020 in a planned 32-week run, but were unable to begin pre-production due to the COVID-19 pandemic.

Evil Dead The Musical had a limited run in Fort McMurray, AB, Canada from December 12–14, 2019. The show was produced by Theatre; Just Because and featured local talent.

The Virginia-based theatre company Wolfbane Productions began staging Evil Dead The Musical in 2013. The outdoor production, held in a wooded area in Appomattox, Virginia, featured a replica cabin, a live band, zip lines, and a 150-seat "splatter zone." The show concluded its final performance on August 5, 2017, after five seasonal runs.

Evil Dead The Musical became the first theatrical production staged at Vinyl Music Hall in Pensacola, January 3–6, 2019, following a successful Kickstarter campaign. Ellen Sandweiss, Betsy Baker and Theresa Tilly, who originated the roles of Cheryl, Linda and Shelly, respectively, in the 1981 film, were special guests of the production, and each appeared on stage in cameo roles on closing night, marking the first time any of them had appeared in a production. The production was also noteworthy for updating several dated references, changing Ed's gender and (as a result) changing "All the Men in My Life Keep Getting Killed By Candarian Demons" to "Everyone in My Life Keeps Getting Killed By Candarian Demons." Dan Sperry also appeared as an opening act at all five performances. The cast included Garrett Summitt (Ash), Kay Joyce (Cheryl), Hannah Sharpe (Annie/Shelly), Sierra Hobbs (Linda), Christopher Holloway (Scott/Moose), Fiama Mastrangelo (Ed), Michael Daw (Jake), Darren Campbell (Lead Demon), David Matthews (Professor Knowby), and Marianne del Gallego (Headless Linda).

== Musical numbers ==
=== 2003 ===
Act One

1. "Cabin in the Woods" - Ash, Linda, Scott, Shelly, and Cheryl
2. "Housewares Employee" - Ash and Linda
3. "It Won't Let Us Leave" - Cheryl
4. "Look Who's Evil Now" - Cheryl and Shelly
5. "What the Fuck Was That?" - Scott and Ash
6. "Join Us" - Cheryl and Moose
7. "Good Old Reliable Jake" - Jake
8. "I'm Not a Killer" - Ash

Act Two

1. "I'm Not a Killer (Reprise)" - Ash
2. "Bit-Part Demon" - Ed
3. "All the Men in My Life Keep Getting Killed by Kandarian Demons" - Annie
4. "Do the Necronomicon" - Demons
5. "It's Time" - Company
6. "Hail to the King" - Company

=== 2006-2023 ===
Act One

1. "Cabin in the Woods" - Ash, Linda, Scott, Shelly, and Cheryl
2. "Housewares Employee" - Ash and Linda
3. "It Won't Let Us Leave" - Cheryl
4. "Look Who's Evil Now" - Cheryl and Shelly
5. "What the Fuck Was That?" - Scott and Ash
6. "Join Us" - Cheryl, Moose, and House Spirits
7. "Good Old Reliable Jake" - Jake, Annie, and Ed
8. "Housewares Employee (Reprise)" - Ash and Linda
9. "I'm Not a Killer" - Ash

Act Two

1. "I'm Not a Killer (Reprise)" - Ash
2. "Bit-Part Demon" - Ed
3. "All the Men in My Life Keep Getting Killed by Candarian Demons" - Annie, Ash, and Jake
4. "Ode to an Accidental Stabbing" - Jake and Annie
5. "Do the Necronomicon" - Scott and Demons
6. "It's Time" - Ash and Company
7. "We Will Never Die" - Demons
8. "Blew That Bitch Away" - Company

=== 2024-Present ===
Act One

1. "Cabin in the Woods" - Ash, Linda, Scott, Shelly, and Cheryl
2. "Housewares Employee" - Ash and Linda
3. "It Won't Let Us Leave" - Cheryl
4. "Look Who's Evil Now" - Cheryl, Shelly
5. "What the F*@k Was That?" - Scott and Ash
6. "Join Us" - Cheryl, Moose, and House Spirits
7. "Good Old Reliable Jake" - Jake, Annie, and Ed
8. "Housewares Employee (Reprise)" - Ash and Linda
9. "I'm Not a Killer" - Ash

Act Two

1. "I'm Not a Killer (Reprise)" - Ash
2. "Bit Part Demon" - Ed
3. "All the Men in My Life Keep Getting Killed by Kandarian Demons" - Annie, Ash and Jake
4. "Ode to an Accidental Stabbing" - Jake and Annie
5. "Do the Necronomicon" - Scott and Demons (Cheryl, Linda, Ed and Jake)
6. "It's Time" - Ash and Demons
7. "We Will Never Die" - Demons
8. "Saved the Fuck’n Day" - Ash and Customers (Scott, Jake, Cheryl, Ed and Linda)
9. "Bows" - Company

== Cast recordings ==
An original cast recording was made in December 2006 and was released on April 2, 2007, and debuted at #4 on the Billboard Show Charts.

A live cast recording of the Ultimate 4D Experience was made in early 2014 and was released in summer of 2014. Currently it is scheduled to only be available at performances of the show, which are based in Las Vegas.
