= Evil Dead: Hail to the King =

2000 video game

- Developer: Heavy Iron Studios
- Publisher: THQ
- Producer: Mark Morris
- Designer: Matt Coohill
- Programmers: Kay Cloud; Neil Kaapuni
- Artist: Ira Gilford
- Composers: Todd Dennis; Chris Rickwood; Tommy Tallarico; Jack Wall
- Platforms: PlayStation, Dreamcast, Microsoft Windows
- Release: NA: December 5, 2000 (PS); NA: December 19, 2000 (DC); NA: March 27, 2001 (PC); EU: June 22, 2001
- Genre: Survival horror
- Mode: Single-player

Evil Dead: Hail to the King is a 2000 survival horror video game developed by Heavy Iron Studios and published by THQ. Released for the PlayStation, Dreamcast, and Microsoft Windows, the game acts as a sequel to the 1992 film Army of Darkness. It was the second video game released to be based on the Evil Dead film franchise, following the 1984 title The Evil Dead, and the first to be developed by Heavy Iron Studios.

== Gameplay ==
Evil Dead: Hail to the King functions much like a Resident Evil game, containing similar features such as pre-rendered backgrounds and semi-fixed camera angles, as well as limited ammunition and fuel for the chainsaw. The player controls the character by pushing the d-pad or analog stick left or right to rotate the character and then move the character forward or backwards by the pushing the d-pad up or down.

Enemies the player faces include the Deadites, animated skeletons, and possessed "Hellbillies" and Wolverine scouts.

== Plot ==
The game takes place eight years after the events of Army of Darkness. After regaining his job at S-Mart and beginning a new relationship with fellow employee Jenny, Ashley "Ash" Williams begins suffering from recurring nightmares about the Necronomicon and the Deadites, which haunt him for years. Wanting to help him, Jenny decides to take Ash back to Professor Knowby's old cabin to help him face his demons.

However, shortly after arriving, Ash's possessed severed hand appears and plays Knowby's old cassette containing the Necronomicon's incantation once again. Despite Ash's attempts to stop it, the evil once again awakens in the woods, smashing through the window and kidnapping Jenny. When Ash goes to grab an axe above the mirror, his evil twin, Bad Ash exits the mirror and knocks him unconscious. After awakening, Ash quickly goes out to the workshed and reassembles his chainsaw-hand before going out to stop the Necronomicon and save Jenny.

After reading some of Professor Knowby's notes, Ash learns of a priest named Father Allard, whom Knowby was working with to decipher the Necronomicon and send the evil back to where it came. Upon consulting Father Allard at his church, Ash departs to gather the five missing pages from the Necronomicon and the Kandarian Dagger, the latter of which he obtains from a possessed Annie Knowby in the cabin's fruit cellar. After the two come across a possessed Jenny, Father Allard uses the pages and the dagger to create a portal and exorcise the demon from Jenny's body. However, Allard then reveals himself to be Bad Ash in disguise, who promptly kidnaps Jenny and jumps into the portal with Ash in hot pursuit, the two arriving in an Arabian village in the 9th century.

Ash finally catches up with Bad Ash, who intends to let Jenny be consumed by the Dark Ones and cross over into this world while Bad Ash will kill Ash and use him as a 'calling card'. The two fight, with Bad Ash transforming into a giant scorpion-like deadite. Nonetheless, Ash still defeats him and manages to use the pages of the Necronomicon to pull Bad Ash into the portal. With Jenny now free from possession, Ash uses another of the spells to open a portal and send them back home.

Upon arriving, Ash and Jenny discover to their horror that they've arrived in a version of Dearborn, Michigan that is ruled by the Dark Ones. Seeing several various necronomicon books in a shop window, Ash screams as the game ends.

== Critical reception ==
Reception

Aggregate score
Aggregator	Score		
Aggregator	Dreamcast	PC	PS
Metacritic	49/100	40/100	51/100

Review scores
Publication	Score		
Publication	Dreamcast	PC	PS
AllGame	1.5/5	N/A	1.5/5
CNET Gamecenter	4/10	N/A	4/10
Computer Games Strategy Plus	N/A	2/5	N/A
Computer Gaming World	N/A	1/5	N/A
Electronic Gaming Monthly	4.5/10	N/A	4.17/10 (Note: Two critics of Electronic Gaming Monthly gave the PlayStation version each a score of 4/10, and the other gave it 4.5/10.)
EP Daily	4.5/10	N/A	N/A
Game Informer	4.5/10	N/A	4.5/10
GameSpot	4.5/10	3.4/10	4.2/10
GameSpy	4/10	N/A	N/A
IGN	3.6/10	3.8/10	4.5/10
Next Generation	2/5	N/A	N/A
Official U.S. PlayStation Magazine	N/A	N/A	2.5/5
PC Gamer (US)	N/A	61%	N/A

The PlayStation version of Evil Dead: Hail to the King received "mixed" reviews, while the Dreamcast and PC versions received "generally unfavorable reviews", according to the review aggregation website Metacritic. AllGame said that the Dreamcast version's graphics were "stagnant, still, lifeless" and that it needed "better control, better combat, a better look and feel." Greg Orlando of NextGen quoted Carl Sandburg's poem "Yes, the Dead Speak to Us" in saying that the same console version "belongs to the Dead, to the Dead and to the Wilderness." Atomic Dawg of GamePro said of the same console version, "Fans may find solace in the story line, but most gamers will cringe at the horror"; (Note: GamePro gave the Dreamcast version three 3/5 scores for graphics, sound, and fun factor, and 2/5 for control.) and of the PlayStation version, "Hardcore Dead-heads may be driven by morbid curiosity to tackle this evil game, as they hold out hope that a better version will show up some day." (Note: GamePro gave the PlayStation version 2.5/5 for graphics, two 3/5 scores for sound and fun factor, and 2/5 for control.)
