= Evil Dead: A Fistful of Boomstick =

2003 video game

- North American box art
- Developer: VIS Entertainment
- Publisher: THQ
- Director: Chris Mullender
- Producers: Robbie Graham; Raphael Hernandez
- Programmer: Chris Mullender
- Writers: Ralph Fulton; Brian Gomez; Philip Lawrence
- Composers: Stewart Clark; Peter McCalman
- Platforms: PlayStation 2, Xbox
- Release: PlayStation 2: NA: May 20, 2003; EU: June 27, 2003; Xbox: NA: June 17, 2003; EU: June 27, 2003
- Genres: Action, hack and slash
- Mode: Single-player

Evil Dead: A Fistful of Boomstick is an action hack and slash video game developed by VIS Entertainment and published by THQ. It was released for the PlayStation 2 and Xbox, and based on the film trilogy The Evil Dead. It is set eleven years after the events of Army of Darkness, and three years after Jenny (Ash's girlfriend from Evil Dead: Hail to the King), was killed in a bus crash. Bruce Campbell returns to voice Ash, and the voices for supporting characters are provided by several notable voice actors, including Debi Mae West, Rob Paulsen and Tom Kenny.

== Plot ==
The game begins three years after the events of Hail to the King. Ash Williams is telling the story of his battles with the Necronomicon Ex-Mortis to an Asian man, and then starts to tell the story of how he ended up with the man in the first place through a series of flashbacks.

=== Dearborn, Michigan: Last Night ===
A special "Live" episode of Mysteries of the Occult starts at the local KLA2 television station (a reference to the movie The Day the Earth Stood Still; KLA2 is pronounced "Klaatu," the name of the protagonist). Trisha Pettywood, a journalist out to expose the truth of the Necronomicon, is the host, with her guest, the parapsychologist and best-selling author Professor Alex Eldridge, a colleague of the late Professor Raymond Knowby, who has written a book based on the Necronomicon. Ash is sitting at his favorite bar in the red-light district, having a few drinks during the broadcast, and badmouths Eldridge, claiming that he wouldn't know the real Necronomicon from "a roll of extra-fluffy two-ply". The bartender, who apparently knows Ash, gives him a free drink, telling him that he is sorry about Jenny, a subject which is apparently still very painful for Ash. Trisha also mentions a local Dearborn man (namely Ash) who claims that the Necronomicon can raise the dead and interdimensionally travel through time, but Eldridge dismisses it as the sad, depraved ramblings of a lunatic, while also claiming that it is easy to get caught up in the book's mythology. Hearing this, a drunken Ash babbles on about his remark, and also about his fights with the Deadites and how he had to amputate his own right hand. Trisha has somehow obtained the tape recording of Professor Knowby, and plays it live as a "treat" to the viewers. Ash, knowing what will happen if they do so, shouts at them not to play it, but of course, they do not hear him. The Deadites are released into the world once more, and the Evil Force floats through town, right into the bar, and possesses the bartender who is promptly shot down by Ash who strangely has his boomstick with him.

Ash goes outside to check out the seriousness of the situation, and it's pretty bad: Deadites are roaming around town, transforming civilians into Deadites themselves, and the local police are apparently going to great lengths to stop them. Ash decides to check out the KLA2 station, since that's where the trouble began, and get more weapons as well, as he is almost out of shotgun ammo. He finds a shovel nearby, and also finds that the Deadites have invaded the Kitten Club (Dearborn's local strip joint), and the police are blocking both the entrance to the bar and the part of town behind it to slay any creatures who come out. He manages to convince the chief of police to let him past after acquiring a police I.D. from a fallen officer and a chainsaw in the lumber yard. However, he discovers that the television station's gates are locked and jammed solid so that Ash cannot open them even with the key, and the station itself is on lockdown, and only the doorman has the key, and he went to the Kitten Club to "die with a smile on his face". The chief allows him in after he uses dynamite to blow up the Deadites in the club's backlot. He acquires the card key to the station, as well as a spell book, along with a spell that temporarily grants him the strength of ten men, which he uses to kick down KLA2's gates. Upon entering, he discovers Trisha and Eldridge being attacked by Deadites and saves them. He talks to Eldridge about what happened, and they unanimously agree that they need to find Professor Knowby's notes about the Necronomicon in order to discover a way to drive the Deadites back.

Afterwards, Trisha and Eldridge run and take shelter in the church, leaving Ash to do the dirty work. Around town, multiple vortices have opened up, releasing Deadites into the town, and the preacher at the church tells Ash that he needs silver to close them. He acquires some from a biker gang after saving them from the Deadites and acquires a handgun from a police officer, as well as Knowby's notes from a professor at the university; unfortunately, Knowby wrote the notes in code, being clearly aware of the dangers posed by the book, and they need a cipher to read them. Ash gives the notes to Eldridge and acquires another spell that allows him to possess Deadites, which he uses to bypass a massive horde of Deadites behind the police station and get the cipher and an envelope addressed to the local auto repairman from the trash can. He gives the envelope to the repairman, but it's only Knowby's payment for his car repairs; however, the guard gives him some explosive shotgun shells as a reward for his troubles. When he returns to the church, he discovers that the door has been broken in, the preacher has been killed, and Trisha and Eldridge are missing. He sets out to find them, and discovers that they have been taken by the Deadites to the park, along with mass numbers of civilians. Ash breaks into the park, kills the Deadites, and gives Eldridge the cipher. Eldridge reads the notes and discovers information about the Kandarian Summoning Stone, a mystical artifact that allows the possessor to control (and destroy) the Deadite hordes. They all deduce that the Stone may be in the local museum, as the museum's founder, Nathaniel Payne, was obsessed with occult artifacts and delighted in collecting them. Trisha and Eldridge go to the museum to search for it, and Ash accompanies them after closing all of the vortices around town.

When Ash arrives at the museum, he finds everything to be strangely quiet; Trisha and Eldridge are nowhere to be seen, and even the Deadites seem to be taking a breather. However, things soon heat up after Ash is locked in the basement and attacked by a small pack of undead sabre-toothed tigers, which he quickly defeats. Afterwards, he encounters more Deadites and acquires a card key from a dead security guard, which he uses to escape the basement, and two antique Greek vases. He finds a gasoline pump and a live security guard in a locker room, who at first mistakes Ash for a Deadite and orders him to stay back until Ash provides one of his famous wisecracks. The guard tells him that he had always known that something like this would happen, and states that Nathaniel Payne had built a temple believed to be used for human sacrifice under the museum and one day had gone down into the temple and never returned. He opens up all of the basement doors (although one is malfunctioning and automatically closes whenever Ash comes near it), and he stays there to continue with the broken door. Ash discovers Trisha and Eldridge, locked inside of the east wing by a power surge, and goes back to the basement to find a way to cut the power. He discovers a spell that allows him to possess hellhounds, and uses this spell to gain access to the malfunctioning door (which happens to also house the power grid) and blows up the generator with a stick of dynamite, freeing Trisha and Eldridge. He returns to the locker room, only to find that the guard has become a Deadite as well, and kills the guard. He finds a divining device hidden behind a portrait of Nathaniel Payne, uses it to find four magical gems, and uses these to gain access to Payne's chamber. He encounters Payne, who has long since been transformed into a demonic, fireball-launching monster, and defeats him by deflecting his fireballs back at him with the shovel. Afterwards, he grabs the Kandarian Summoning Stone and flirts with Trisha, though she has reservations about dating him, as people around town have claimed that he is crazy, perhaps even dangerous. It is soon revealed that Eldridge knew about the true nature of the Necronomicon all along, and plans to use its power and the Stone to take over the world. He opens up a vortex and disappears into it, and Ash decides to follow him. Trisha asks him if he is crazy, but he merely states that "crazy is as crazy does", kisses her, and follows Eldridge into the vortex while Trisha stays behind.

=== Dearborn, Michigan: circa 1695 ===
Ash lands right after Eldridge, who had correctly predicted that he would follow him, in the colonial times of Dearborn. Eldridge sends a horde of Deadites after him and escapes. After killing them, a group of villagers arrive and mistake Ash for the town blacksmith, simply named "Williams the Blacksmith". Ash soon meets the blacksmith, who turns out to be his ancestor and resembles him in both appearance and mannerisms. When Ash reveals this to him, he is not the least bit surprised due to the Deadites running amok. He upgrades Ash's shotgun, allowing it to fire eight consecutive rounds before needing to reload, and also converts the gas pump into a flamethrower using some of his own moonshine. Ash looks around town for more parts and finds a piece of scrap iron, but when he returns, he finds mass amounts of Deadite bodies laying about and the blacksmith missing. Ash quickly sets out to find him, realizing that the death of the blacksmith in the past will also erase him from existence, and, after passing through the town cemetery, discovers that Eldridge has kidnapped the blacksmith. Eldridge uses the rules of time paradoxes to blackmail Ash into finding a spell scroll that will allow him to safely pass through the vortex, promising that he will let the blacksmith go if Ash complies. Ash does so, but Eldridge does not make good on the deal and escapes through the vortex, warning Ash that his two monstrous Deadite bodyguards will kill the blacksmith if he attempts to follow. Ash quickly finds a way around this by acquiring another possession spell and using it to kill the two Deadites. Ash gives the blacksmith the piece of scrap iron, and follows Eldridge through the vortex after the blacksmith coins their new family motto: "A man's gotta do what a man's gotta do."

=== Dearborn, Michigan: circa 1863 ===
Ash once again lands after Eldridge, this time in Civil War-era Dearborn. Eldridge quickly enters the Unionists' fort and opens a vortex. In order to get into the fort, Ash manages to convince both the Unionists and the Confederates to call a cease-fire and help him defeat the Deadites; the captain of the Unionists is Ash's Civil War era ancestor the great-great-great-grandson of Williams the Blacksmith, who is in possession of a Gatling gun that the blacksmith made from the piece of scrap iron that Ash gave him. Ash confronts Eldridge and shoots him, but this only transforms him into a monstrous dragon-like demon. Ash manages to defeat monster-Eldridge, and travels back to the present time.

=== Evil Dearborn ===
Ash arrives back in the present of Dearborn, only to discover that the Deadites have taken over the whole town in his absence and are led by their Queen, who is in possession of the Kandarian Summoning Stone, which Ash stupidly left back in the Unionists' fort. After freeing the prisoners, Ash confronts the Deadite Queen, who turns out to be Trisha. Trisha reveals that she has taken the stone to rule the world on her own. Ash explodes her by making her swallow dozens of dynamites, and reacquires the Stone.

=== Epilogue ===
Now back to where the game first began, Ash attempts to use the Stone to restore Dearborn to its former glory, but blunders and ends up warping himself back in time to feudal Japan, during the time of the Mongul's invasion of Japan, where he has been captured by guards. As it turns out, the man he has been telling the story, who turns out to be Japanese Emperor Kameyama who cannot understand a word he's been saying, though they claim that he hasn't shut up for three hours. Kameyama decide to use the Kandarian Summoning Stone against the Mongols and execute Ash, but before they can do so, the Evil Force returns and possesses the man who Ash has been relating his tale to, as well as some nearby samurai. Ash grabs a katana from one of the guards and tells the Deadites to "come get some!" in perfect Japanese, thus ending the game.

== Reception ==
Reception

Aggregate score
Aggregator	Score	
Aggregator	PS2	Xbox
Metacritic	55/100	58/100

Review scores
Publication	Score	
Publication	PS2	Xbox
AllGame	N/A	2/5
Electronic Gaming Monthly	2.67/10	N/A
Eurogamer	5/10	N/A
Game Informer	7.75/10	8/10
GamePro	N/A	4/5
GameRevolution	N/A	C−
GameSpot	5.3/10	5.3/10
GameSpy	2/5	N/A
GameZone	N/A	6/10
IGN	6.4/10	6.4/10
Official U.S. PlayStation Magazine	3/5	N/A
Official Xbox Magazine (US)	N/A	5.3/10
Maxim	2/10	N/A
The Village Voice	N/A	6/10

Evil Dead: A Fistful of Boomstick received "mixed" reviews on both platforms according to the review aggregation website Metacritic. Chris Carle of IGN gave the game a mixed review, calling its gameplay "fun, if a little repetitive", and noting that its twenty-dollar retail value is a suitable maximum price. Adam Dodd of Bloody Disgusting wrote that the game was "actually pretty enjoyable" and that it was an improvement on its predecessor, Evil Dead: Hail to the King.
