= Army of Darkness: Defense =

2011 video game

- Developer: Backflip Studios
- Publisher: Backflip Studios
- Platforms: iOS, Android
- Release: iOS; May 12, 2011; Android; December 3, 2012
- Genre: Tower defense
- Mode: Single-player

Army of Darkness: Defense was a tower defense video game developed by Backflip Studios that was released on May 12, 2011, for the iOS and Android platforms. The game is based on the cult film Army of Darkness. It had a video game content rating of ages 12 and up, and also featured Bruce Campbell as the voice of character Ash Williams. According to Backflip, the game is no longer supported and has been removed from the App Store and Google Play beginning on May 5, 2018.

== Plot ==
The tower defense game requires players to defend an area from oncoming waves of attacking enemies.

The game follows the protagonist from the film, Ash Williams. The player fights off waves of the enemy using an army to protect the Necronomicon (a magical book). The game also has appearances by Lord Arthur, Sheila, Duke Henry the Red and Evil Ash (characters featured in the movie).

In this tug-of-war, casual defense game based on the MGM classic movie, you play Ash, the time-traveling, evil-fighting, S-Mart sales clerk as you defend Lord Arthur's castle and the Necronomicon from the oncoming hordes of evil undead. Of course, you can't do it alone! Call upon multitudes of allies including Lord Arthur, Duke Henry the Red, the Wiseman, and many more to help you in your quest to defend the unholy book and use it to return to your own time. Army Of Darkness: Defense takes the witty charm of the cult classic movie and combines it with gorgeous graphics and innovative casual gameplay that is certain to entertain any mobile gamer. Features include: Bruce Campbell as Ash Williams, 50 initial waves and an unlockable endless wave, more than 100 hilarious quotes from the movie, originally composed music score, special abilities including the boomstick, the chainsaw, the '88 deathcoaster and many more spells, all of your favorite characters including Arthur, Henry, Sheila, the Wiseman and Evil Ash.

— official description from the website

== Gameplay ==
Players directly control the character by walking left to right, while a shotgun automatically shoots constantly if there are enemies in sight. Players also have two abilities available that you choose before each wave, with many options to choose from. Melee attacks happen automatically when there is an enemy in range. Players obtain gold by completing waves and gold will also drop from enemies that have been killed, but it must be obtained by walking over it, which can be risky to the player as it exposes themselves to damage. The game is over if players get killed or if the enemies reach the book of undead.

=== Playable characters ===
The player can increase Ash's health and melee damage. While the power-ups: super boomstick, the wrong book, arrow volley, magic words, catapult volley and deathcoaster provide services such direct damage, summoning random health amounts to Ash or his army, summoning random soldiers, creating mass damage, and pushing back hordes.

=== Non-playable characters ===
In the game the player can command members of Ash's army that will battle opposing troops, such as peasants, swordsmen, spearmen, armored guards*(the only non-special character that has high health), archers, horsemen, torch and sword boys. All these characters have low to medium health and damage. They take low to medium amount of material to spawn. These characters abilities are for close combat, ranged combat, and equipping the army with weapons. The special characters such as Arthur, Henry, and Wiseman are all considered characters that can only be spawned one at a time each. For example, the player would not be able to spawn two Arthurs at the same time but can have Arthur, Henry and the Wiseman summoned at the same time. These characters will either have a special ability like the Wiseman that heals, or high health and high damage with an extra advantage like Arthur that has two archers accompany his character. These characters take a high amount of certain material to spawn.

=== The Castle ===
The player can add defenses to the castle that holds the Necronomicon they are defending. The player can upgrade the health of the Necronomicon itself and add wall archers, wall catapults, and a pit in front of the castle's steps that the player can knock enemies into. The castle smith's rate of production can be increased by the player.

== Reception and reviews ==
On Metacritic, the iOS version of the game had a score of a 74 percent based on reviews from 16 critics, indicating "mixed or average reviews". IGN gave it a 7.5 stating: "Army of Darkness Defense is fun enough that it doesn't matter if you're familiar with the films, but fans will get a little extra from it. The tongue-in-cheek tone of the films is in full effect, with lines cut straight from the film blaring about every five seconds. This can quickly become annoying, but it's certainly no reason to stop playing. Ultimately, Army of Darkness Defense doesn't do anything all that surprising with the castle defense genre, but it's fun and addictive for short play sessions". Touch Arcade rated it four out of five stars, saying "at a glance it seemed like Army of Darkness Defense was going to offer more strategy and RPG than the usual castle defense titles, but it ends up being a bit shallow. It's still an entertaining title and you'll likely enjoy your time with it as long as you keep your expectations in check".

Slide to Play criticized the game, finding that, "Army of Darkness Defense amounts to little more than a much too simple game with a familiar coat of paint. And when the appeal of that coating wears off, you're left with a game with little lasting appeal". Gamezebo rated it 3.5/5, observing that "it's got a certain limited appeal for fans of the franchise, but it isn't really good enough to be considered a lot of fun on its own merits. Players could certainly do worse than this, but they could also do a lot better". FanSided opined that, "although basic, this game is really addictive and a hell of a lot of fun for anyone who is a fan of the franchise or even just of “The Chin” himself". Lifewire praised the game stating it "is a real winner" and "if you like either the movie or tower defense games, you'll like this game. And if you like both the movie and tower defense games, you'll absolutely love this game".
