= Army of Darkness =

1992 film by Sam Raimi

- Theatrical release poster by John Bolton
- Directed by: Sam Raimi
- Written by: Sam Raimi; Ivan Raimi
- Produced by: Robert Tapert
- Starring: Bruce Campbell; Embeth Davidtz
- Cinematography: Bill Pope
- Edited by: Bob Murawski; Sam Raimi (Note: Credited as R. O. C. Sandstorm)
- Music by: Joseph LoDuca
- Production companies: Dino De Laurentiis Communications; Renaissance Pictures; Introvision International, Inc.
- Distributed by: Universal Pictures
- Release dates: October 9, 1992 (Sitges); February 19, 1993 (United States)
- Running time: 81 minutes (United States); 89 minutes (International)
- Country: United States
- Language: English
- Budget: $11 million
- Box office: $21.5 million

Army of Darkness (Note: Titled onscreen as Bruce Campbell vs. Army of Darkness.) is a 1992 American dark fantasy comedy horror film directed, co-written, and co-edited by Sam Raimi. It is the sequel to Evil Dead II (1987) and the third installment in the Evil Dead franchise. The film stars Bruce Campbell reprising his role from the previous films, and Embeth Davidtz. The plot follows Ash Williams as he is trapped in the Middle Ages and battles the undead in his quest to return to the present.

The film was made as part of a production deal with Universal Pictures after the financial success of Raimi's Darkman (1990). Filming took place in California in 1991. The makeup and creature effects for the film were handled by two different companies: Tony Gardner and his company Alterian, Inc. were responsible for the makeup effects for Ash and Sheila, while Kurtzman, Nicotero, & Berger EFX Group was credited for the remaining special makeup effects characters. Tom Sullivan, who had previously worked on Within the Woods (1979), The Evil Dead (1981), and Evil Dead II, also contributed to the visual effects.

Army of Darkness had its premiere at the Sitges Film Festival on October 9, 1992, and was released in the United States on February 19, 1993. It grossed $22 million on an $11 million budget and received generally positive reviews from critics. Like its predecessors, the film has accumulated a large, international cult following in the years since its release.

A fourth film, Evil Dead, a standalone sequel of the franchise initially released and marketed as a remake, was released in 2013, followed by a fifth film, Evil Dead Rise, released in 2023, and a sixth film Evil Dead Burn, released in 2026. Ash vs Evil Dead, a television series and direct sequel to the original trilogy, premiered in 2015 and ran for three seasons.

== Plot ==
Having been accidentally transported to the Middle Ages, (Note: As depicted in Evil Dead II (1987).) Ash Williams is captured by Lord Arthur's men, who suspect him of being a spy for Duke Henry, with whom Arthur is at war. He is enslaved along with the captured Henry, his shotgun and chainsaw are confiscated, and he is taken to Arthur's castle. Ash is thrown in a pit where he kills a Deadite and regains his weapons from Arthur's Wise Man. After demanding that Henry and his men be set free and killing a Deadite publicly, Ash is celebrated as a hero. He grows attracted to Sheila, the sister of one of Arthur's fallen knights.

According to the Wise Man, the only way that Ash can return to his time is through the magical Necronomicon Ex-Mortis. Ash then starts his search for the Necronomicon. As he enters a haunted forest, an unseen force pursues Ash into a windmill, and he crashes into a mirror. Small reflections of Ash in the mirror shards come to life and antagonize him, with one becoming a life-sized copy of him, which Ash dismembers and buries.

When he arrives at the Necronomicon's location, he finds three books instead of one, and has to determine which one is real. Realizing at the last moment that he has forgotten the last word of the phrase that will allow him to remove the book safely – "Klaatu barada nikto" – he tries to mumble and cough his way through the pronunciation. He grabs the book and begins rushing back. Meanwhile, unknown to Ash, his ruse has failed and his body's copy rises from the dead, uniting other Deadites into the Army of Darkness.

Upon his return, Ash demands to be returned to his own time. However, Sheila is abducted by a flying Deadite and later transformed into one by "Evil Ash". Ash becomes determined to lead the outnumbered humans against the Army, and the people reluctantly agree. Using knowledge from textbooks in his 1973 Oldsmobile Delta 88 and enlisting the help of Duke Henry, Ash successfully leads the soldiers to victory over the Deadites, blows up "Evil Ash", saves Sheila, and brings peace between Arthur and Henry. Using a passage from the Necronomicon, the Wise Man tells him how to return to the present by giving him a potion after reciting the same phrase as earlier.

Back in the present, Ash recounts his story to a fellow employee at the S-Mart department store. As he talks to a female co-worker who is interested in his story, a surviving Deadite, present because Ash once again forgot the last word, attacks the customers. Ash kills it using a Winchester rifle and exclaims, "Hail to the king, baby", before passionately kissing the co-worker.

== Cast ==
- Bruce Campbell as Ashley "Ash" J. Williams and "Evil Ash"
- Embeth Davidtz as Sheila
- Marcus Gilbert as Lord Arthur
- Ian Abercrombie as Wise Man
- Richard Grove as Duke Henry the Red
- Timothy Patrick Quill as Blacksmith
- Michael Earl Reid as Gold Tooth
- Bridget Fonda as Linda
- Bill Moseley as Deadite Captain
- Patricia Tallman as Possessed Witch
- Bob Bergen as Necronomicon Ex-Mortis/Creature Voices
- Ted Raimi as Cowardly Warrior/Second Supportive Villager/S-Mart Clerk/Skeleton Voices
- Angela Featherstone as Girl in S-Mart (uncredited)

== Production ==
=== Development ===
Plans to make a third Evil Dead film had been circulating for a number of years, even prior to the production of Darkman. Evil Dead II made enough money internationally that Dino De Laurentiis was willing to finance a sequel. Director and script writer Sam Raimi drew from a variety of sources, including literature with A Connecticut Yankee in King Arthur's Court and Jonathan Swift's Gulliver's Travels and films like The 7th Voyage of Sinbad, Jason and the Argonauts, The Three Stooges, and Conan the Barbarian. Evil Dead II, according to Bruce Campbell, "was originally designed to go back into the past to [the year] 1300, but we couldn't muster it at the time, so we decided to make an interim version, not knowing if the 1300 story would ever get made". Promotional drawings were created and published in Variety during the casting process before the budget was deemed too little for the plot. The working title for the project was Medieval Dead, before it was later known as Evil Dead III: Army of Darkness. The title "Army of Darkness" came from an idea by Irvin Shapiro, during the production of Evil Dead II.

=== Writing ===
Initially, Raimi invited Scott Spiegel to co-write Army of Darkness because he had done a good job on Evil Dead II, but he was busy on rewrites for the Clint Eastwood film The Rookie. After the good experience of writing the screenplay for a film called Easy Wheels, Sam and his brother Ivan decided to co-write the film together. They worked on the script throughout the pre-production and production of Darkman. After filming Darkman, they took the script out and worked on it in more detail. Raimi says that Ivan "has a good sense of character" and that he brought more comedy into the script. Campbell remembers, "We all decided, 'Get him out of the cabin.' There were earlier drafts where part three still took place there, but we thought, 'Well, we all know that cabin, it's time to move on.' The three of us decided to keep it in 1300, because it's more interesting". Campbell and Tapert would read the script drafts, give Raimi their notes and he would decide which suggestions to keep and which ones to discard.

==== Original ending ====
For the film's original ending, using a passage from the Necronomicon, the Wise Man tells Ash to swallow six drops of the potion to return to the present; unfortunately, due to a distraction by falling rocks, Ash miscalculates the amount of potion needed to be able to correctly return to his own time, swallowing seven instead of six. As a result, Ash wakes up in a post-apocalyptic London where human civilization is destroyed, and he screams in dismay at having overslept. Universal Pictures objected to this climax, feeling that it was too negative and depressing in tone; as such, a more positive and optimistic ending was filmed and ultimately incorporated into the theatrical cut.

=== Pre-production ===
The initial budget was $8 million; during pre-production, however, it became obvious that this was not going to be enough. Darkman was also a financial success and De Laurentiis had a multi-picture deal with Universal and so Army of Darkness became one of the films. The studio decided to contribute half of the film's $12 million budget. However, the film's ambitious scope and its extensive effects work forced Campbell, Raimi and producer Robert Tapert to put up $1 million of their collective salaries to shoot a new ending and not film a scene where a possessed woman pushes down some giant pillars. Visual effects supervisor William Mesa showed Raimi storyboards he had from Victor Fleming's film Joan of Arc that depicted huge battle scenes and he picked out 25 shots to use in Army of Darkness. A storyboard artist worked closely with the director in order to blend the shots from the Joan of Arc storyboards with the battle scenes in his film.

Traci Lords was among the actresses auditioning for the film, saying in 2001, "I didn't get the part but I clicked with Bruce [Campbell]," with whom she would later work as a guest star in the TV series Hercules: The Legendary Journeys.

=== Filming ===
Principal photography took place between soundstage and on-location work. Army of Darkness was filmed in Bronson Canyon and Vasquez Rocks Natural Area Park. The interior shots were filmed on an Introvision stage in Hollywood. Raimi's use of the Introvision process was a tribute to the stop-motion animation work of Ray Harryhausen. Introvision uses front-projected images with live actors instead of the traditional rear projection that Harryhausen and others used. Introvision blended components with more realistic-looking results. To achieve this effect, Raimi used 60-foot-tall Scotchlite front-projection screens, miniatures and background plates. According to the director, the advantage of using this technique was "the incredible amount of interaction between the background, which doesn't exist, and the foreground, which is usually your character".

Shooting began in mid-1991, and it lasted for about 100 days. It was a mid-summer shoot and while on location on a huge castle set that was built near Acton, California, on the edge of the Mojave Desert, the cast and crew endured very hot conditions during the day and very cold temperatures at night. Most of the film took place at night and the filmmakers shot most of the film during the summer when the days were longest and the nights were the shortest. It would take an hour and a half to light an area leaving the filmmakers only six hours left to shoot a scene. Money problems forced cinematographer Bill Pope to shoot only for certain hours Monday through Friday because he could not be paid his standard fee. Mesa shot many of the action sequences on the weekend.

It was a difficult shoot for Campbell who had to learn elaborate choreography for the battle scenes, which involved him remembering a number system because the actor was often fighting opponents that were not really there. Mesa remembers, "Bruce was cussing and swearing some of the time because you had to work on the number system. Sam would tell us to make it as complicated and hard for Bruce as possible. 'Make him go through torture!' So we'd come up with these shots that were really, really difficult, and sometimes they would take thirty-seven takes". Some scenes, like Evil Ash walking along the graveyard while his skeleton minions come to life, blended stop-motion animation with live-action skeleton puppets that were mechanically rigged, with prosthetics and visual effects.

During the filming of a scene in which Campbell flipped a stuntman down a set of stairs, the lower part of his face contacted with a piece of armor, which resulted in him bleeding. Campbell was brought to a local emergency room to have the wound mended by a plastic surgeon, who, upon seeing the number of artificial cuts and slashes on Campbell's face, asked, "Which one is it?" In order to maintain the continuity of the injuries and dirt on Ash's face, the on-set makeup specialist utilized a plastic template that fit over Campbell's face.

The filmmakers initially intended to reshoot the shot from Evil Dead II in which Ash and the Oldsmobile fall from the sky onto the ground of medieval England, with Campbell later stating that the reason they sought to reshoot it rather than reusing the footage from the previous film was due to "a rights issue". Campbell was initially supposed to jump from a ladder onto the ground, and the Oldsmobile dropped from its suspension on an aircraft cable attached to a crane on a nearby access road. However, the support legs under the crane gave out, causing the car to prematurely crash to the ground and the crane to fall off a cliff into a gravel pit. Campbell noted that, "Ironically, after all the hassle, we wound up using the footage from 1986."

=== Post-production ===
While De Laurentiis gave Raimi and his crew freedom to shoot the film the way they wanted, Universal took over during post-production. Universal was not happy with Raimi's cut, specifically its ending in which Ash wakes up in a futuristic, post-apocalyptic wasteland, as they felt it was too negative. A more upbeat ending was shot a month later in a lumber store in Malibu, California. (Raimi later noted, "Actually, I kind of like the fact that there are two endings, that in one alternate universe Bruce is screwed, and in another universe he's some cheesy hero".) Two months after principal filming was finished, a round of re-shoots began in Santa Monica and involved Ash in the windmill and the scenes with Bridget Fonda.

Raimi needed $3 million to finish his film, but Universal was not willing to give him the money and delayed its release due to a dispute with De Laurentiis over the rights to the Hannibal Lecter character which Universal needed so that they could film a sequel to The Silence of the Lambs. The matter was finally resolved, but the release date for Army of Darkness was pushed back from summer of 1992 to February 1993.

For the film's poster, Universal brought Campbell in to take several reference head shots and asked him to strike a sly look on his face. They showed him a rough of the Frank Frazetta-like painting. The actor had a day to approve it or, as he was told, there would be no ad campaign for the film. Raimi ran into further troubles when the Motion Picture Association of America gave it an NC-17 rating for a shot of a female Deadite being killed early on in the film. Universal wanted a PG-13 rating, so Raimi made a few cuts and was still stuck with an R rating. In response, Universal turned the film over to outside film editors who cut the film to 81 minutes and another version running 87 minutes that was eventually released in theaters, still with an R rating.

The film was dedicated to The Evil Dead sales agent and Evil Dead II executive producer Irvin Shapiro, who died before the film's production in 1989.

== Music ==
Danny Elfman, who composed the score for Darkman, wrote the "March of the Dead" theme for Army of Darkness. After the re-shoots were completed, Joseph LoDuca, who composed the music for The Evil Dead and Evil Dead II, returned to score the film. The composer used his knowledge of synthesizers and was able to present many cues in a mock-up form before he recorded them with the Seattle Symphony. A vinyl release of the score was revealed during the MondoCon in Austin, Texas, on October 3 and 4, 2015 over Mondo Records.

== Reception ==
=== Box office ===
Army of Darkness was released by Universal on February 19, 1993, in 1,387 theaters in the United States, grossing $4.4 million (38.5% of total gross) in its first weekend. On a budget of $11 million, the film earned $11.5 million in the US and $21.5 million worldwide.

=== Critical response ===
On review aggregator website Rotten Tomatoes, the film holds an approval rating of 69% based on 90 reviews, with an average rating of 6.6/10. The site's critics consensus reads, "Some of the evil magic is gone as this trilogy capper dispenses with most of the scares, but Bruce Campbell's hammy charm and Sam Raimi's homage to classic visual effects make for a fun enough adventure." On Metacritic, the film holds a weighted average score of 59 out of 100, based on 32 critics, indicating "mixed or average" reviews.

Roger Ebert gave the film two out of four stars and wrote, "The movie isn't as funny or entertaining as Evil Dead II, however, maybe because the comic approach seems recycled." In her review for The New York Times, Janet Maslin wrote that "Mr. Campbell's manly, mock-heroic posturing is perfectly in keeping with the director's droll outlook." Desson Howe, in his review for The Washington Post praised the film's style: "Bill Pope's cinematography is gymnastic and appropriately frenetic. The visual and make-up effects (from artist-technicians William Mesa, Tony Gardner and others) are incredibly imaginative." However, Entertainment Weekly gave the film a "C+" rating and wrote, "This spoofy cast of thousands looks a little too much like a crew of bland Hollywood extras. By the time Army of Darkness turns into a retread of Jason and the Argonauts, featuring an army of fighting skeletons, the film has fallen into a ditch between parody and spectacle."

=== Legacy ===
In the years since its release, Army of Darkness has developed a strong cult following referred to by fans as "The Medieval Dead" and "Captain Supermarket" in Japan. Many have considered this the film that solidified Ash Williams as a cultural icon, and attribute several memorable lines to him, such as “Hail to the king, baby".

=== Accolades ===
Army of Darkness won the 1994 Saturn Award for Best Horror Film.

== Other media ==
=== Future ===
In March 2013, shortly before the release of Evil Dead, a soft reboot of the franchise, Raimi stated that the next Evil Dead film will be Army of Darkness 2. Campbell confirmed that he would star as an older, but not necessarily wiser, Ash. At a WonderCon panel in March, Campbell and Fede Álvarez, director of the 2013 film, stated that their ultimate plan was for Álvarez's Evil Dead 2 and Raimi's Army of Darkness 2 to be followed by a seventh film which would merge the narratives of Ash and Mia. Later in October, Campbell once again confirmed in an interview with ComicBook.com that he will be reprising his role as Ash in the sequel. Fede Álvarez posted a status update on his Twitter account that Raimi will direct the sequel. Campbell later commented that the rumor about him returning was false.

In July 2014, Campbell stated it was likely the planned sequel would instead be a TV series with him as the star. The ten-episode season of Ash vs Evil Dead premiered on Starz on October 31, 2015, with the pilot co-written and directed by Sam Raimi. Due to legal issues with Universal, the events from Army of Darkness could not specifically be mentioned in the first season; it was later resolved and the events from that film were mentioned in the second season. In addition to Campbell, the series stars Dana DeLorenzo, Ray Santiago, and Lucy Lawless. The series was later canceled after three seasons, with Campbell officially retiring from the role of Ash in live action.

A new Evil Dead film, entitled Evil Dead Rise, written and directed by Lee Cronin and starring Alyssa Sutherland, Lily Sullivan, Gabrielle Echols, Morgan Davies, Nell Fisher, and Mia Challis was theatrically released on April 21, 2023.

=== Other references ===
In a non-canonical television series Carrie, Margaret White (portrayed by Samantha Sloyan) who is working at the S-Mart store, a reference to the Evil Dead series.

=== Comics ===
Army of Darkness had a comic book adaptation and several comic book sequels. The movie adaptation, from publisher Dark Horse Comics, was published before the film's theatrical release.

- Army of Darkness (movie adaptation)
- Army of Darkness: Ashes 2 Ashes
- Army of Darkness: Shop till You Drop Dead
- Darkman vs. Army of Darkness
- Army of Darkness vs. Re-Animator
- Army of Darkness: Old School
- Army of Darkness: Ash vs. The Classic Monsters
- Marvel Zombies vs. The Army of Darkness
- Army of Darkness: From the Ashes
- Army of Darkness: Long Road Home
- Freddy vs. Jason vs. Ash
- Freddy vs. Jason vs. Ash: The Nightmare Warriors
- Army of Darkness/Xena: Warrior Princess: Why Not?
- Xena vs. Army of Darkness: What Again?
- Army of Darkness vs. Hack/Slash

=== Role-playing game ===
Eden Studios, Inc. published the Army of Darkness Roleplaying Game in 2005.

=== Video games ===
The 2000 video game Evil Dead: Hail to the King, and its 2003 sequel Evil Dead: A Fistful of Boomstick, act as sequels to Army of Darkness, taking place several years after the events of the film. Both games were published by THQ; Hail to the King was released for PlayStation, Dreamcast, and Microsoft Windows, and A Fistful of Boomstick was released for PlayStation 2 and Xbox.

In 2011, a tower defense mobile game titled Army of Darkness: Defense, developed by Backflip Studios and published by MGM Interactive, was released for iOS and Android.

The 2022 video game Evil Dead: The Game—published by Saber Interactive for PlayStation 4, PlayStation 5, Windows, Xbox One and Xbox Series X/S—includes playable characters from Army of Darkness, including Ash, Lord Arthur, Duke Henry the Red, and Evil Ash. A "Castle Kandar" map, featuring locations from Army of Darkness, was made available as downloadable content (DLC).

== See also ==
- List of films featuring miniature people

== Sources ==
- Warren, Bill (2000). The Evil Dead Companion. Macmillan. ISBN 0312275013.
- Campbell, Bruce (2002). If Chins Could Kill: Confessions of a B Movie Actor. LA Weekly Books for Thomas Dunne Books/St. Martin's Press. ISBN 9780312291457.
- Muir, John Kenneth (2004). The Unseen Force: The Films of Sam Raimi. Applause Books. ISBN 9781557836076.
