= Succubus (disambiguation) =

A succubus is a type of female demon said to initiate sexual intercourse on males.

Succubus may also refer to:

== Books ==
- "The Succubus" (short story), a story by Honoré de Balzac
- The Succubus, a 1979 novel about a succubus by Kenneth Rayner Johnson

== Film and television ==
- Succubus (1968 film) (German title: Necronomicon - Geträumte Sünden), a 1968 West German horror film by Jesús Franco
- Succubus (2024 film), an American erotic horror film
- "Succubus" (South Park), an episode of South Park
- Succubus: Hell-Bent, a 2007 horror film with Gary Busey
- Succubus, a 1987 television film with Barry Foster, Lynsey Baxter, Pamela Salem and Jeremy Gilley

== Gaming ==
- Succubus, a spinoff of Agony
- Succubus (Dungeons & Dragons), a monster in Dungeons & Dragons

== Other uses ==
- The Succubus (sculpture), a sculpture by Auguste Rodin
- "Succubus" (song), a song by Five Finger Death Punch

== See also ==
- Succubous, type of leaf arrangement
- Incubus (disambiguation)
