= List of succubi in fiction =

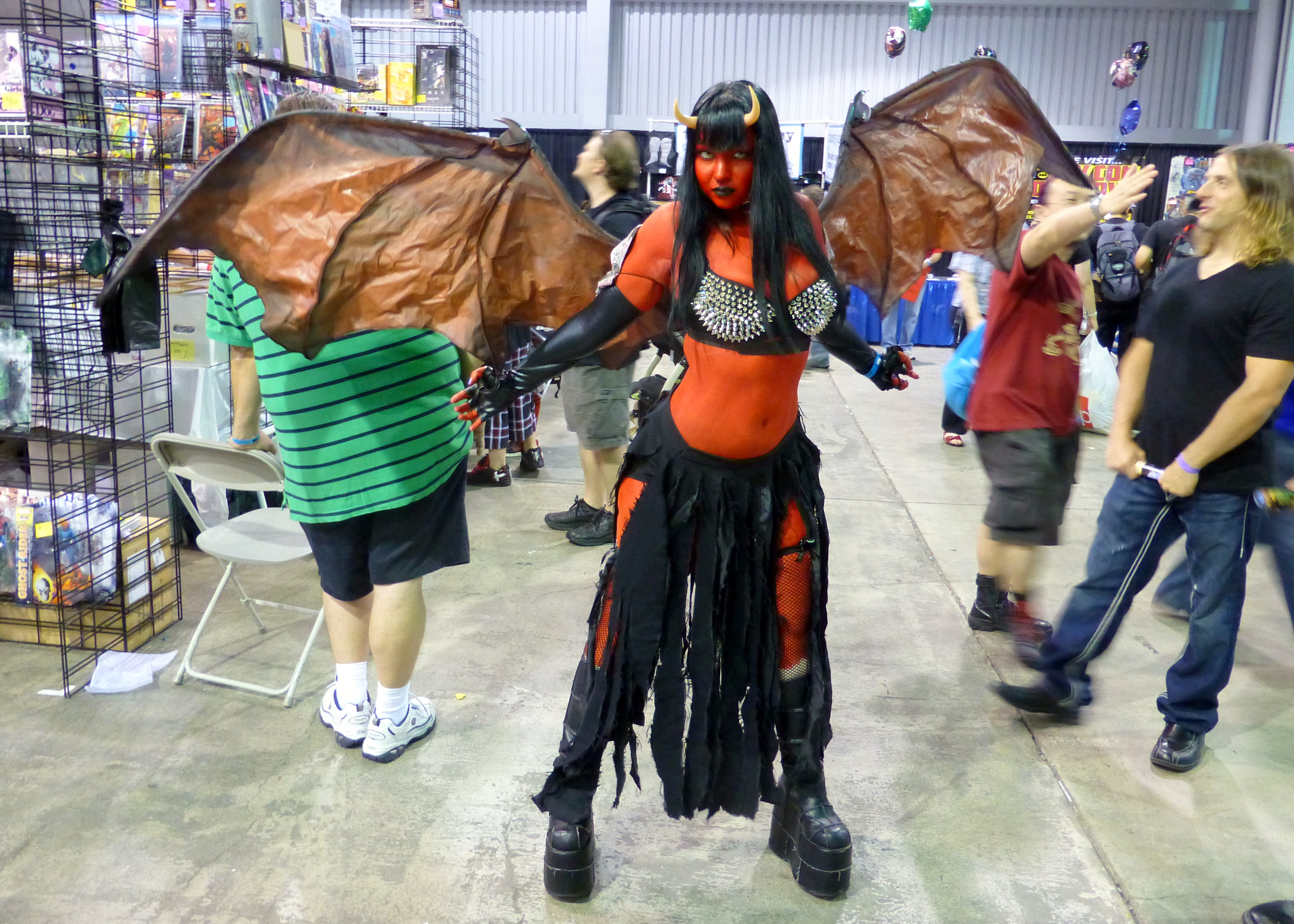
Succubus cosplay

A succubus (plural succubi) is a type of demoness referenced in various works of fiction.

== Literature ==
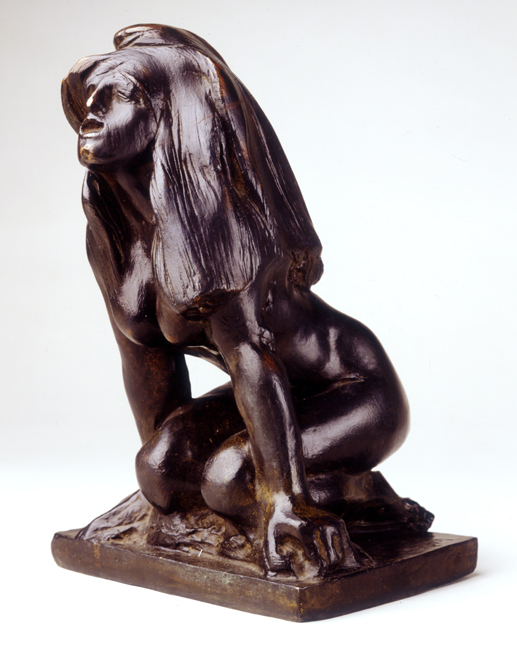
The Succubus, 1889 sculpture by Auguste Rodin

- Thomas Middleton's 1605 play A Mad World, My Masters, the philandering Master Penitent Brothel is tempted by a succubus assuming the form of his illicit partner, using song and dance in a failed attempt to seduce him.
- Honoré de Balzac's early 1800s short story "The Succubus" concerns a 1271 trial of a she-devil succubus in the guise of a woman, who, amongst other things, could use her hair to entangle victims.
- Charles Williams's 1937 novel Descent into Hell portrays an academic who consciously rejects the potential affections of a real woman in favor of a physically identical but perfectly obedient and pliable succubus.
- Richard Matheson's 1962 short story "The Likeness of Julie" portrays a succubus named Julie (later adapted into the TV film Trilogy of Terror)
- Irving A. Greenfield's 1970 novel Succubus has the ancient demon hitching a ride on a woman marrying an archeologist
- In Poul Anderson's 1971 novel Operation Chaos, the protagonists are visited shortly after being married by a succubus/incubus who changes genders in its attempts to seduce both of them.
- Tanith Lee's 1976 short story The Demoness features a pale red-haired woman in an isolated tower who seduces men and vampirically drains them of their thoughts and emotions. It was first published in Lin Carter's The Year's Best Fantasy Stories: 2. The Science Fiction and Fantasy Writers of America later included it in the Fantasy Hall of Fame in 1998.
- Kenneth Rayner Johnson's 1979 novel, The Succubus, outlines the story of a male afflicted by the incarnation of the demon Lilith.
- Alfred Bester's 1979 short story, "Galatea Galante", describes its title character, a young woman genetically engineered to order by an arrogant but brilliant geneticist, as possessing the powers of a succubus through a genetic anomaly deliberately introduced in her creation. Unbeknownst to either of them, she seduces her creator while they are both asleep and is impregnated by him.
- Stephen King's 1982 novel The Dark Tower: The Gunslinger, and the rest of The Dark Tower series, Roland encounters a succubus in a circle of stones while following the Man in Black. This succubus then later helps an incubus in impregnating Susanna Dean with Roland's child, Mordred, a villain in later books.
- Toni Morrison's 1987 Beloved novel's protagonist, Beloved, has been discussed in academic works as a modern use of this theme.
- In For Love of Evil (1988), by Piers Anthony, succubi, including Lilith, make up the Kingdom of Hell, which reflects Dante's Seven Circles of Hell.
- Eric (1990) by Terry Pratchett (from the Discworld series) has a small reference to succubi, in which a demonologist describes how his grandfather spent his entire life trying to summon one, only to succeed in conjuring a Neuralger, a female demon that has a headache every night.
- Ray Garton's 1991 novel The New Neighbor tells the story of a family who has an attractive new neighbor move in across the street. She turns out to be a succubus.
- In Laurell K. Hamilton's 1993 Anita Blake: Vampire Hunter series, the main character, Anita Blake, finds herself becoming a succubus.
- In Orson Scott Card's 1996 novel Treasure Box, a witch conjures a succubus, who represents the dreams and desires of the protagonist in order to convince him to open a mysterious box.
- The White Court of Vampires in Jim Butcher's 2000 series Dresden Files are described as succubi and incubi. One of these incubi is the major supporting character Thomas Raith.
- Once (2001), written by James Herbert, has a description of a "demon form" succubus.
- Jonathan Stroud's 2003 series Bartimaeus Trilogy describes a succubus as a kind of demon preferred by male magicians, and also that Mr. Tallow might be the offspring of a magician and a succubus.
- The Felix Castor series (2006) by Mike Carey, features a succubus who takes the name Juliet, gives up feeding on men and enters into a lesbian relationship while working as an exorcist.
- 2007's Hell on Earth, a dark paranormal series by Jackie Kessler, stars the succubus Jezebel, who runs away from Hell, hides on Earth as an exotic dancer, and learns the hard way about being mortal.
- In the 2008 novel Breaking Dawn by Stephenie Meyer, the three original sisters of the Denali coven (Tanya, Kate, and Irina) were revealed to be the originators of the myth of the succubus, as they would seduce men and drain them of blood following intercourse. The three sisters also appear in the Breaking Dawn films, but their history as succubi is not mentioned.
- 2009 or earlier, Georgina Kincaid, a 21st-century urban fantasy novel series by Richelle Mead, features succubus Georgina Kincaid trying to find a vampire hunter.
- In Vitelli Grigorowski's The Secrets of Witch Falls novel series, succubi are the main characters and antagonists.
- In James Blish's After Such Knowledge trilogy series, arms manufacturer Dr. Baines' secretary is seduced by a succubus demon.
- In Andrzej Sapkowski's novel The Lady of the Lake, a succubus appears living among humans in Beauclair, Geralt's friend, the vampire Regis, falls in love with the demon.
- In Barton Paul Levenson's novel "The Celibate Succubus" (2013), a succubus named Delilah, fearing punishment for showing compassion to a victim, flees Hell and winds up working for an anti-demon organization connected with the Catholic Church.
- In the novel "Shadows of the Teutons" by Russian writer Alexey Ivanov (2021). The book takes place in two eras: in the middle of the 15th century in the capital of the Teutonic Order, Malborg, and in May 1945 in Pillau. In 1457, the Polish knight Kajetan Klichovsky makes a pact with Baphomet and undertakes to obtain the sword of Satan Liguet, which belongs to the Teutonic Order. If he fails to fulfill the condition, a curse will fall on his family: only one person will survive in each generation. A distant descendant of Kajetan, historian Vincent Klichovsky, tries to find the sword to lift this curse. He has to deal with the Nazis (the sword ended up in the hands of the escaped Gauleiter Koch) and the Soviet special services. In the medieval era, there is a succubus - the maiden Sigelda, raised from the grave in the Cemetery of the Beheaded by the antagonist to help him take possession of Satan's sword.

== Film ==
- Necronomicon – Geträumte Sünden (a.k.a. Succubus (1968), Jess Franco
- The Devil's Nightmare (1971), Jean Brismée
- Spectre (1977) television film by Gene Roddenberry; the main character Sebastian is lured by a succubus in the opening minutes of the episode
- The Unholy (1988) a priest's fight with a succubus
- Def by Temptation (1990) feature film directed by James Bond III follows a succubus who preys on Black men, drawing the attention of a young minister-in-training, his childhood friend, and a homicide detective.
- The Haunted (1991) television film based on The Smurl Family haunting drama, Jack Smurl is visited and raped by a succubus.
- Serpent's Lair (1995)
- The Ninth Gate (1999) a mysterious succubus-like girl (self-described as a Fallen Angel) helps the protagonist find satanic engravings. Her origin is vague enough and behaviour specific enough to suggest she is now a succubus.
- Saint Sinner (2002), a 19th-century monk is sent to the 21st century to retrieve two succubi that he unleashed
- Flesh for the Beast (2003)
- Demon Hunter (2005) features a succubus as an antagonist.
- Umbrage (2009) about how the ancient succubus Lilith is brought to the world by a magic mirror
- Jennifer's Body (2009) Megan Fox portrays a teenage cheerleader-turned-succubus who kills the boys in her town
- Case 39 (2009) Jodelle Ferland plays a little girl named Lilith, who is a succubus and can create illusions to torment her victims
- V/H/S (2012) the segment Amateur Night features three friends who run afoul of a succubus, played by Hannah Fierman, who is listed in the credits as Lily, apparently a reference to Lilith
- Under the Skin (2013) Though the main character is literally an alien, she/it shares many similarities to succubi: it takes the form of a human woman, lures men with sexual seduction, and then uses men for personal gain (which often leads to the death of the seduced man).
- Siren (2016), a spin-off of the aforementioned V/H/S, focuses on the same succubus, played by Hannah Fierman
- Suicide Squad (2016), Enchantress The entity that inhabits June was previously named Succubus, and in the film she allies with her brother Incubus
- Reflection of Darkness (2024), Succubus was the original controversial name for the movie, depicting "The Devil in female form" In the film the female succubus demon appears at one point in male form as a deception and not a male version of the demon. Generally the male counterparts are referred to as Incubus

== Television ==
- 1975 February Kolchak: The Night Stalker episode 16 "Demon in Lace", a succubus is the cause of the mysterious deaths of men
- 1989 Superboy season 1, episode 25 "Succubus" features a succubus, played by Sybil Danning.
- 1990 October (to April 1991) She-Wolf of London episode features a succubus who could cause immediate and extreme aging in her victims.
- 1996 April X-Files episode "Avatar", Assistant Director Skinner has troubles with a succubus that he has seen since he served in the Vietnam War.
- 1996 December The Real Adventures of Jonny Quest episode "Eclipse", Jonny and Jesse try to save Hadji from a succubus-like creature.
- 1997 March Poltergeist: The Legacy episode 23, "Black Widow", the group encounters a succubus which is unkillable and develop feelings for the character "Nick"; they are only able to stop her by using enchanted chains that sap her strength followed by dumping her in a river.
- 1997 In the Star Trek: Voyager episode "Favorite Son", Harry Kim is drawn to a planet inhabited by women who could be described as genetic succubi; they implant genetic material in men on other worlds using a retrovirus, drawing them there to have their DNA extracted for reproduction, only to be killed in the process.
- 1999 In "The Succubus", the April 21, 1999 episode of the animated comedy series South Park' third season, Chef falls in love with and plans to marry a succubus. The boys defeat her by singing the love theme from The Poseidon Adventure backwards.
- 1999 November Charmed episode "She's a Man, Baby, a Man!", Prue becomes a man in order to attract a succubus who is murdering local men. The succubus is portrayed as a beautiful woman with a razor-sharp tongue who sucks all the testosterone out of a man's body. They were previous witches who made a pact with darkness to keep themselves from heartbreak.
- 2004 October Hex, the demon Malachi turns the women he has sex with into slaves, which Ella Dee refers to as "succubi".
- 2014 November In the Sleepy Hollow episode "Heartless", Henry Parrish summons a succubus to suck the life force out of victims to then be used as nourishment for the demon Moloch.
- 2005 November Masters of Horror episode, Jenifer, a policeman succumbs a succubus-like female who can entrance men in spite of her hideous appearance.
- 2007 March to September "Blood Ties" An Incubus was featured in an episode
- 2008 May Reaper episode "Cancun", Sock (Tyler Labine) falls for a succubus who feeds off human life and whenever she kisses him, he gets a rush of energy but loses a year of his life. By the end, Sock says that he only has a few years left to live.
- 2008 June Metalocalypse episodes 33 "Klokblocked" (and maybe also "Black Fire Upon Us") feature Lavona Succuboso, a woman who intends to use a "loin extractor" to extract the semen of Nathan Explosion and use it to impregnate the women in her group Succuboso Explosion, to create a race of warriors that will conquer the world. May or may not be an actual succubus.
- 2010 March Ugly Americans Comedy Central animated series features a succubus main character named Callie Maggotbone.
- 2010 June–September The Gates features different mythological and occult creatures, among them succubi.
- 2010 September Lost Girl is a Canadian television series that features succubi, the main character Bo being one of them. They have to feed on the sexual energy of humans, both female and male, to sustain themselves. Feeding also permits them to heal as though they never took any damage. They also have the power to make others do their bidding by touching them or other means.
- 2011 February Regular Show episode "Benson Be Gone", the new boss named Susan, she concentrates the groundskeepers to become clones of hers. After slacking, she became her true gigantic form like a succubus. Susan is returned in "Exit 9B".
- 2012 March Being Human episode 28 "Hold the Front Page" features a succubus named Yvonne who has the power to make men fall in love with her upon physical contact, however having sex with her would result in death. She is unable to kill vampires like this though, because they are already dead. A succubus is described as the child of a human and a demon.
- 2012 September My Babysitter's a Vampire episode "Siren Song", a succubus-like demonic siren named Serena, who sings that makes people violent.
- 2017 August Midnight, Texas. A succubus kills men until she is gotten rid of by Manfred.
- 2022 September The Imperfects. One of the main protagonists, Abbi (Rihanna Jagpal) becomes one due to an unethical scientist. Her pheromones cause people around her to be abnormally attracted and manipulated by her.
- 2024 May Smiling Friends. Mr. Boss marries a malformed succubus named Brittney, who is actually Filia Diabolus, the daughter of Satan who manifests every 100 years to kill influential men and grant their belongings to her father.

== Animation ==
- 1993 Words Worth the character called Delta.
- 1995 Darkstalkers (the American cartoon version) features, among its villains, the succubus Morrigan Aensland.
  - Night Warriors OVA, based on the second Darkstalkers game, also features Morrigan Aensland.
- 2010 Dante's Inferno: An Animated Epic, Dante encounters and slays succubi in the second circle of hell, lust.
- 2020 Dragon's Dogma, Ethan encounters and defeats a succubus in the episode titled ‘Lust’.
- 2021 Brave Animated Series, features a succubus in a cheerleader outfit who likes to peek the history of all world.
- 2021 Helluva Boss, features a succubus pop singer named Verosika Mayday who uses her singing to make humans lustful.

== Comics ==
- In 1973, Marvel Comics debuted the succubus character, Satana.
- In 1991, the succubus Chantinelle is introduced by DC Comics, and later befriends John Constantine, the star of the Hellblazer comic series.
- In 2004, UDON Comics created, among other titles by Capcom, the Darkstalkers Comic series that ran for six issues and a trade paperback. In the comic, the succubus Morrigan Aensland plays a large role. Her other half Lilith is seen only briefly in the Belial prequel and on the cover of some of the issues.
- In 2014, Deadpool: The Gauntlet saw succubus Shiklah make her debut. She was married to Deadpool.

== Japanese visual/written media ==
- 1989 anime Grimms Fairy Tale Classics implies that the main antagonist of its version of The Iron Stove is a succubus rather than a witch.
- 1996 manga Night Warriors: The Comic Series by Run Ishida, adaptation of Darkstalkers.
- 1999 manga series (later adapted into a 2004 OVA) Equation by Kurenai Azuki. The lead heroine, Sayoko Saeki, and the main villain, Sonia, are succubi. Sayoko is a succubus who works with an agency within the Japan Ground Self-Defense Force to stop cults from undermining the government. As the story progresses, more about Sayoko and Sonia is revealed.
- 2000 manga Lilim Kiss by Mizuki Kawashita, features title character Lilim who is a succubus.
- 2002 anime show Digimon, the character named Lilithmon, based on the mythological Lilith and one of the Seven Great Demon Lords representing the sin of lust. In some official profiles of the franchise, it is stated that "it confounds its opponents with its bewitchingly lovely appearance, and it is said that those who are taken in by its temptations are invariably granted death."
- 2004 manga Rosario + Vampire by Akihisa Ikeda, features succubus Kurumu Kurono as one of the main characters.
- 2004 light novel series Good Luck! Ninomiya-kun is about a shy succubus Mayu Tsukimura who cohabitates with the main guy character. The protagonist's childhood friend, Reika Houjou, who is Mayu's romance rival, is also revealed to be a succubus.
- 2004 tokusatsu Tokusou Sentai Dekaranger (part of the wider Super Sentai series), one of the Three Hells Siblings is named Succubus. She has the power to drain the life from those she touches. When the program was adapted into Power Rangers S.P.D. in 2005, Succubus' American counterpart was named Morgana.
- 2005 manga Mark of the Succubus, a world of demons and the main character is a succubus called Maeve.
- 2007 manga Lotte no Omocha! by Yui Haga, features title character heroine Astrarotte "Lotte" Ygvar, a 10-year-old succubus princess.
- 2010 manga Hatsukoi Succubus by OKADA Haruki, Richille, a fallen succubus who lacks sensuality and magical powers is sent to the human world to learn about seduction.
- 2012 manga Monster Musume, succubi are a subspecies of hornless devils who live up to their namesakes and possess womb tattoos.
- 2012 light novel The Testament of Sister New Devil by Tetsuto Uesu, features succubus Maria Naruse, the guardian of the main female protagonist and title character.
- 2012 light novel Overlord by Kugane Maruyama, features succubus Albedo as the female lead character.
- 2012 light novel KonoSuba by Natsume Akatsuki, features a succubus brothel, that fulfills the dreams of male adventurers while also keeping women saver.
- 2014 manga Interviews with Monster Girls by Petos, features Sakie Satou, a succubus math teacher who fears her instincts and genetics may cause trouble for men around her, causing her to wear gym cloths or not fall asleep to prevent her pheromones and wet-dream invasion ability from being released respectively.
- 2016 manga Ishuzoku Reviewers by Amahara, features a massive brothel complex "Succubus Tower" with thousands of succubi working as prostitutes.
- 2018 manga Kinsō no Verumeiyu: Gakeppuchi Majutsushi wa Saikyō no Yakusai to Mahō Sekai o Tsukisusumu by Kōta Amana and Yōko Umezu, features succubus Vermeil
- 2021 manga Godland Company by Toshiaki Iwashiro has little Kuroto the Karasu Tengu, Mia Blutheim the vampire, Neruru Hearteater the succubus, Shadric Kagel the shadow earl, and the mysterious Haizono.
- 2021 manga Make the Exorcist Fall In Love by Arima Aruma and Masuku Fukayama, features Imuri Atsuki as the femme fatale succubus.

== Webcomics ==
- In 2000, webcomic Sinfest, the major supporting characters Baby Blue and Fuchsia are succubi, working directly for the devil.
- In 2002, Pibgorn, Drusilla is a succubus dressed in mufti
- In 2009, Eerie Cuties features, among its support cast, a pubescent succubus named Chloe She later got her own spinoff book, with a number of other succubi.
- 2010 or earlier Darkness Within webcomic stars a succubus named Nicole Richards; Lucia and her mother Lilith are also prominent succubi in the series and Lucia's brother Roger is an incubus.

== Music ==
- " Lilith Fair " 1997-1999, 2010 Music festival and tour founded by Canadian musician/songwriter Sarah McLachlan et al which featured female artists, like Tracy Chapman, Suzanne Vega, and female represented bands like The Cardigans. The festival got its name from a reference to the succubus Lilith
- The Rolling Stones' 1973 song "Dancing With Mr. D" depicts an encounter with a succubus.
- In 1976, Cliff Richard's "Devil Woman" tells of one man's bad luck with a beautifully evil woman
- Xmal Deutschland's 1982 song "Incubus/Succubus" was one of their most popular songs.
- Lords of Acid's 1994 Album Voodoo-U features cover art with succubuses.
- In 1997 Norwegian symphonic black metal band Dimmu Borgir has a song called "A Succubus In Rapture" on their album Enthrone Darkness Triumphant, which describes this creature.
- The namesake song of Steely Dan's February 2000 album "Two Against Nature" includes a description of a succubus, "Madame Arzulie, she come last night, bang you silly but leave a nasty bite".
- Part 3 of the May 2000 album Wishmaster's song "FantasMic" by Nightwish briefly mentions a succubus.
- Alan O'Day's 1977 song Undercover Angel describes a romantic encounter with a benevolent succubus, who seduces him and then leaves, urging him to find love in the real world.
- In 2001 Bitter Suites to Succubi was released by British band Cradle of Filth, who have performed several songs about succubi.
- In 2010, Cradle of Filth released the album Darkly, Darkly, Venus Aversa which like its predecessor listed above have numerous songs about succubi. Lilith Immaculate is a single release from the album that is about succubus Lilith.
- In September 2002 Tech N9NE mentions in Absolute Power (Tech N9ne album) (along with D12 minus Eminem) a succubus in his song "She Devil".
- The song "Serpentine" from American rock band Disturbed's fifth studio album from August 2010 Asylum is reportedly about a succubus who utilizes her sexuality to seduce men.
- The Grammy and Academy Award-winning American hip-hop star, Eminem mentions the word "succubuses" to describe women in the March 2011 song, "Space Bound". He raps, "Don't ask me why I have no love for these motherfucking hos/Blood sucking succubuses what the fuck is up with this..."
- 1969 or later, the succubus is frequently visually depicted in liner notes and cover arts of Jim Steinman works.
- 1974–1996 Joey Ramone, lead singer of The Ramones, wrote a song called "Succubus" which was rejected by the band because they did not know what a succubus was.
- In 2013, Azealia Banks released a song titled "Succubi".
- The band Samhain wrote "Black Dream" about a man dreaming of a succubus
- The rapper Ken Carson released a song titled “Succubus” in 2023.

== Gaming ==
Illustration of a succubus as used in the game, Dungeons & Dragons

=== Tabletop ===
- Dungeons & Dragons, the succubus is a type of tanar'ri demon. The succubus is one of the earliest monsters to be included in the game, having appeared under the demon entry in the Eldritch Wizardry supplement (1976). Demons like the succubus were considered among the "standard repertoire of "Monsters"" of the game by Fabian Perlini-Pfister. Rob Bricken of io9 identified the succubus as one of "The 12 Most Obnoxious Dungeons & Dragons Monsters".
- Warhammer 40,000, succubi are squad leaders for Dark Eldar Wych squads, while incubi form the bodyguard of Dark Eldar lords
- A succubus named "Sophie" is the mascot for the tabletop miniatures company Reaper Miniatures

=== Video games ===
- In Silent Hill 2, the character of Maria is a succubus. Maria is a physical manifestation of the protagonist James Sunderland's sexual frustration he experienced while his wife Mary was terminally ill. Throughout the events of the game, Maria can be seen acting in a more suggestive manner toward James and tempts him with sexual acts.
- In Catherine, the titular character is a succubus and is central to the game's main conflict.
- Darkstalkers has two characters, Morrigan and Lilith, who are succubi and also appear in several other Capcom titles, in particular cross-over fighting games. Lilith is actually a third part of Morrigan's power which takes form itself after being separated for a long time, and since then Lilith has returned to Morrigan but sometimes still retains her shape as a succubus.
- In Diablo, succubi are an enemy type usually encountered in Hell. The two most recognizable succubi in the world are Lilith (Queen of the Succubi) and Andariel (Maiden of Anguish). Other characters like Cydaea (Azmodan's consort) can also be considered as succubi.
- Drakan: Order of the Flame, succubi is a type of enemy.
- Castlevania: Symphony of the Night and Lament of Innocence, Scarlet is a succubus who appears as a boss and as one of Dracula's attendants. A great succubus, who also is a similar boss appears in Mirror of Fate. Succubi are also recurring minor enemies found throughout the castle in many of the games in the Castlevania series.
- Catacomb Armageddon, the level The Lair of the Succubus features enemies who appear as pale skinned naked demon girls with long red hair covering their private parts. They shoot hearts at the player.
- Planescape: Torment, Fall-From-Grace (or "Grace") is a chaste succubus priestess who can join the player's party. A beautiful blonde woman with bat wings, she is the only healer in the game and may be a potential romantic interest for the player's character. Fall-From-Grace is voiced by Jennifer Hale.
- Disciples II, succubus is the highest class available in the Witch upgrade tree for Cultists in the Legions of the Damned. They are capable of transforming an entire enemy party into Imps.
- Star Ocean: Till the End of Time, a succubus appears as a monster in Level 2 at the Maze of Tribulations; her attacks include Charm Person, which causes the chaos status ailment on male party members.
- In the real-time strategy game Warrior Kings, the succubus is a unit available to Pagan players through the Henge (which are constructed by the High Priestess). Succubi are able to charm enemy units, thus making them switch to the player's side, possess a unit and make him commit acts of heresy to stop opposing peasants from working, and send enemy units into a rage, where they will attack anyone near them.
- Megami Tensei anthology, Succubus is a recruit-able field enemy that exists in various sub-series such as Soul Hackers, Devil Survivor and the Persona role-playing games, notably in Persona 5.
- Viper GTS, featuring bombshell Carrera and exotic redhead Mercedes, a direct sequel to one of the stories included in Viper V-6, namely The Devil Came, by now-defunct company Sogna. A eroge visual novel for FM Towns, PC-98, and Sharp X68000 platforms.
- Lost Kingdoms and Lost Kingdoms II, a succubus is one of the monsters the protagonist must fight against and can capture and use via mystic cards. It appears as a thin pale scantily clad woman with batwings.
- Disgaea series, succubus is a class of demon that has the appearance of a lightly-dressed big-breasted woman with horns and bat wings.
- Overlord, succubi are encountered as strong enemies and a particular succubus queen is responsible for the corruption of one of the seven fallen hero antagonists in the game, each of whom embodies one of the seven deadly sins—the sin in this case being lust; they attack by seducing the player's minions, then capturing them, and flying away and killing them one-by-one
- Heroes of Newerth, Succubus is a playable hero whose abilities focus primarily on seducing and mesmerizing opponents. She is depicted as an attractive red devil girl.
- Might and Magic Book One: The Secret of the Inner Sanctum, in the town of Portsmith, where only women live, and male characters are drained of life, a succubus is found in a hidden area
- Heroes of Might and Magic V, Succubus and Succubus Mistress are magic units in the Inferno faction and have red skin, wings, horns, claws, and cloven feet; Succubus Mistress also has fire instead of hair and more intense red skin and a unique attack that strikes up to four non inferno units in a row. Biara, the main antagonist of the story, is a succubus.
- Dark Messiah of Might and Magic, Xana, a being tied to the protagonist Sareth, is later revealed to be a succubus. Also, succubi are mentioned in books found during the game.
- Warlords: Battlecry II, succubi are flying units available to the Daemon race. The daemon's Titan is also a very large blue succubus named Balora (or at least seems to be).
- Starship Titanic, by Douglas Adams, features a transportation system consisting of robots connected by pneumatic tubes, called the Succ-U-Bus, an ironic pun: the Succ-U-Bus speaks with a deep male voice (voiced by Adams himself), and does not behave at all like a succubus.
- Noctropolis, a 1994 DOS computer third-person adventure game by Flashpoint Productions, Inc. and published by Electronic Arts. In the game, the player assumes the role of the character Peter Grey, a lonely bookstore owner who winds up in the world of his favorite comic book. In this game is a character known as The Succubus.
- Age of Conan: Hyborian Adventures, succubi is a type of enemy
- The Witcher 2: Assassins of Kings, Succubus is a minor character who is accused of murdering young townsmen. She is presented as a beautiful girl with horns, goat legs and a small tail. The main character may engage in a sexual intercourse with her. There are also minor quests in The Witcher 3: Wild Hunt featuring succubi.
- Sakura Succubus is a dating visual novel about amassing a harem of sexy succubi. Develop and Published by Winged Cloud, released in 2020 for Switch, PS4 and PS5.
- Dota 2, Queen of Pain is a playable hero that is portrayed as a succubus.
- The Binding of Isaac: Rebirth, Lilith is a succubus that was added as a playable character in the Afterbirth DLC.
- Succubus, a horror action video games by Madmind Studio, a demon princess, Vydija, as a playable character. A spin off to Agony.
- League of Legends, Evelynn is a demon shade succubus, with powers to hunt down and torment her victims, with her catchphrase, "A little heaven, before the hell".
- In NetHack, succubi, along with their incubus counterparts, are rare monsters known for their seduction “attack” where the player and succubus “lie in each other’s arms”, this can cause negative effects on the player if the succubus enjoys it more or positive effects if the player enjoys it more, either can depend on the player’s charisma.
- In Hubert Chardot's The Devil Inside, the protagonist's alter ego is a succubus named Deva.
- In Warcraft III: The Frozen Throne, succubi creep units can be fought and hired as mercenaries in maps set in Outland.

=== MMORPGS ===
- Aura Kingdom has a demonic Eidolon, who can become your adventuring partner, by the name of Succubus.
- In Bloodline: Heroes of Lithas, The Luxuriant is a clan of Lilin - race of incubi and succubi. Incubus Gnassag is a romantic interest of player character.
- City of Heroes and City of Villains, succubi are members of the Circle of Thorns arcane enemy group and appear as red-skinned women with small horns and thigh-high boots. Their powers include Come Hither (confusion), Entrance (hold), Hellish Bolts, and Blackclaw (combat attacks).
- EverQuest II, the necromancer class can summon a succubus, which has red skin, a devil tail, a short skirt, and a tube top; she grows horns when fighting, and is voiced by Susan Boyd.
- Gaia Online has an evolving item called Alruna's Rose. This item, upon completion, features a pair of scantily-clad demons named Alruna the Succubus and Anurla the Incubus; the item gained infamy and popularity on the website for the provocative items and poses it yielded each phase.
- Mabinogi, Succubi are the boss or bosses in a solo or advance run of the Rabbie Dungeon.
- Ragnarok Online, the succubus is a high-level dark attribute monster.
- The Matrix Online, Succubi are Merovingian/Exile-affiliated NPCs who have the appearance of a beautiful woman and have a purple, red, or green see-through dress with matching long hair and eye colors.
- World of Warcraft, players who choose the Warlock class can summon a succubus as one of their controllable demons, who is depicted with bat wings, dark hair, pale red skin, hooves instead of feet, and a barbed tail, and whose abilities include "Seduction", a skill which renders humanoid monsters and players immobile.
- Vindictus, The succubus is a boss type monster. she wears black clothing and has long black hair and black boots.
- Lineage II, The succubus are winged female monsters, dressed in seductive clothes.They are described as being either low-rank servants of the land dragon Antharas or maids employed by Palibati Queen Themis, a powerful undead located in the Seal of Shilen.
- Darkages, Succubi are found deep in the Mileth Crypts, and have a chance to drop a Succubus's Hair, which are used to perform the ascension ritual.
