= Katia Winter =

Swedish actress

- Born: 13 October 1983 (age 42); Stockholm, Sweden
- Occupation: Actress
- Years active: 2005–present

Katia Winter (born 13 October 1983) is a Swedish actress. She is best known for her roles as Nadia in the Showtime series Dexter (2012), Katrina Crane in the Fox series Sleepy Hollow (2013–15), Freydís Eiríksdóttir in The CW series Legends of Tomorrow (2017–18), and Gwen Karlsson in the CBS/Paramount+ series Blood & Treasure (2019–2023). She also appeared in the satirical superhero series The Boys on Amazon Prime Video as the Russian Mob boss Little Nina (2019–present).

== Early life ==
Winter was born in Stockholm. After graduating from high school, she moved to London to study at a stage school. She moved to Los Angeles in the early 2010s.

== Career ==
Winter appeared on British television series and in films including the 2009 drama Unmade Beds and the 2011 drama Everywhere and Nowhere.

After making a move to the U.S. she immediately booked the lead female role in Arena opposite Kellan Lutz and Samuel L. Jackson. Soon after she played the lead role in the 2012 independent film Love Sick Love alongside Matthew Settle and in the 2013 independent film Banshee Chapter with Ted Levine.

In 2012 she appeared in the NCIS episode "Need To Know". In the same year she also joined the cast of Dexter for the show's seventh season, playing the recurring role of Nadia, a Russian stripper who works in a Miami club.

From 2013 to 2015, Winter starred as Katrina Crane on the Fox series Sleepy Hollow.

== Personal life ==
In 2013, Winter married musician Jesse Glick. They separated in June 2015, and she filed for divorce in February 2016. In 2020, she moved back to Sweden with her British boyfriend. They reside in Stockholm.

== Filmography ==
=== Film ===
Year	Title	Role	Notes
2005	Stockholm Boogie	Party Girl	
2005	Storm	Bargirl	
2007	Night Junkies	Ruby Stone	
2007	The Seer	Ada	
2008	The Perfect Life	Zoe	Video short
2009	Unmade Beds	Hannah	
2009	Malice in Wonderland	Swede	
2009	Prey and Escape	Girl of the Sea	Short
2009	Level Playing Field	Helen	Short
2009	Barry Brown	Elizabeth Sparrow	Short
2010	The Symmetry of Love	Angie	
2010	Anaphylaxis	The Poet	
2011	Everywhere and Nowhere	Bella	
2011	Arena	Milla	Video
2011	Freya	Freya	Short
2012	Love Sick Love	Dori	
2013	Fedz	Alessandra Ragnfrid	
2013	Banshee Chapter	Anne Roland	
2013	Stranger Within	Sophie	Video
2014	Luna	Amber	
2015	Knight of Cups	Katia	
2017	Negative	Natalie	
2019	The Wave	Natalie	
2020	10 Things We Should Do Before We Break Up	Terren	
2020	You're Not Alone	Emma	
2020	The Catch	Beth McManus	
2022	Ur spår	Lisa	
2022	The Year I Started Masturbating	Hanna	
TBA	L.V.J.	Michelle Cox	Post-production
TBA	1066	Edith Swanneck	Pre-production

=== Television films ===
Year	Title	Role	Notes
2013	Crimes of Passion: Tragedy in a Country Churchyard	Barbara	

=== Television series ===
Year	Title	Role	Notes
2005	Dubplate Drama	Scarlet	7 episodes
2009	Lewis	Marina Hartner	Episode: "Allegory of Love"
2012	NCIS	Ava Baransky	Episode: "Need to Know"
2012	Dexter	Nadia	9 episodes
2013–15	Sleepy Hollow	Katrina Crane	25 episodes
2017–18	Legends of Tomorrow	Freydís Eiríksdóttir	2 episodes
2019	Solsidan	Suzy	3 episodes
2019–2023	Blood & Treasure	Gwen Karlsson	12 episodes
2022–2024	The Boys	Little Nina	5 episodes
