= Two witnesses =

Two prophets mentioned in the Book of Revelation

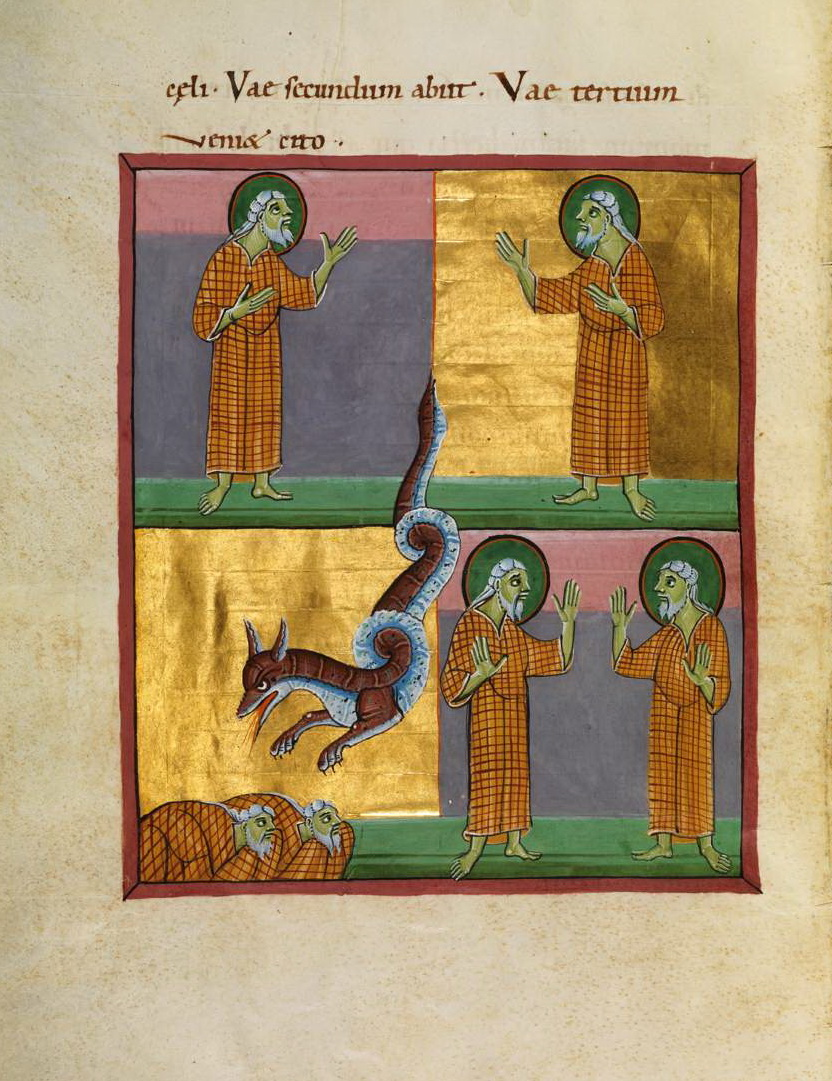
The two witnesses, as depicted in the Bamberg Apocalypse, an 11th-century illuminated manuscript.

The two witnesses (Ancient Greek: δύο μάρτυρες, romanized: duo martyres) are two figures mentioned in Revelation 11:1-14. Some Christians interpret them as two literal prophets, such as Moses and Elijah or Saint Peter and Saint Paul. Others interpret them as symbols for a group or groups of people, such as the Christian church (one group) or the Jews and the Christians (two groups). Still others interpret them as a symbol of two concepts, such as the Torah and Nevi’im or the Old Testament and New Testament. The earliest interpretation of the two witnesses is that they are Enoch and Elijah, the only two that did not see the death appointed to humans as stated in the Scriptures. (However, humans who are alive at the Second Coming of Christ are exempt from this general appointment of death.) Hippolytus of Rome is the first commentator to unambiguously present this view.

== Textual analysis ==
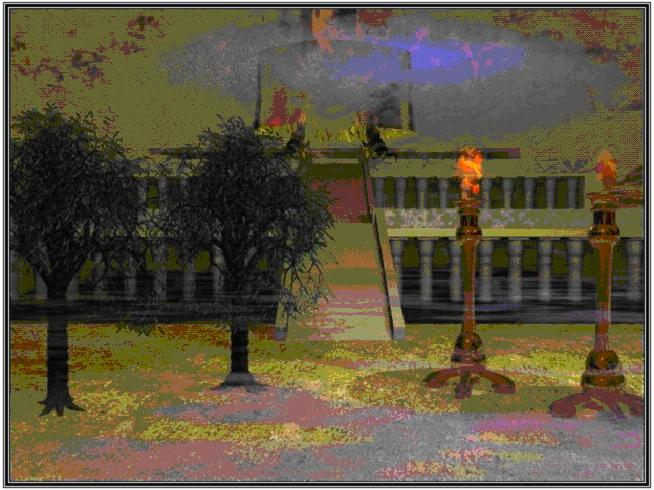
"These are the two olive trees and the two lampstands standing before the God of the earth." Revelation 11:4

According to the text, the two witnesses are the "two olive trees and the two lampstands" that have the power to destroy their enemies, control the weather and cause plagues. They prophesy for 1,260 days clothed in sackcloth. They are eventually defeated by the beast from the abyss, but rise again, ascending to heaven after three and a half days.

== Exegesis ==
In attempting to interpret Revelation 11, commentators have generally understood the two witnesses in one of four ways or as a combination of two or more of these ways:

1. as individuals appearing in the future, being either two returning biblical figures or two presently unknown figures;
2. as individuals who were contemporaries of the author of Revelation, such as Peter and Paul;
3. as a corporate and personal symbol, such as the martyrs or the totality of the Christian church;
4. as a non-personal symbol, such as the Old and New Testaments or mercy and grace.

=== As individuals appearing in the future ===
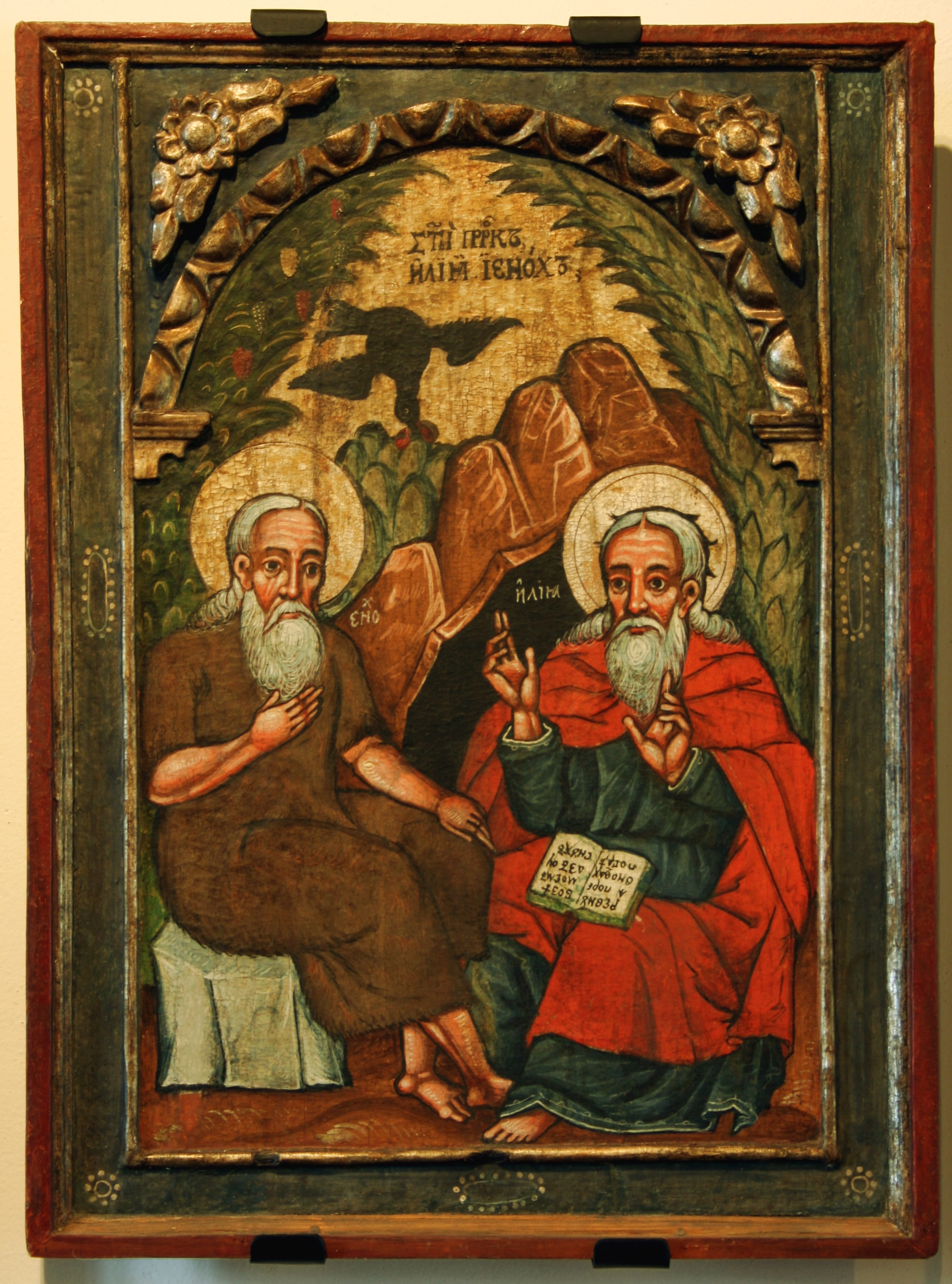
Elijah and Enoch, 17th century icon

The early Christian writer, Hippolytus of Rome, concluded that the two witnesses would be Enoch and Elijah, the two individuals who did not experience death according to other biblical passages (Genesis 5:24; 2 Kings 2:10-11; Hebrews 11:05). This is the earliest proposed identification for the two witnesses. This view is evident outside of early interpretive or apologetical Christian literature. For example, the apocryphal books called the Apocalypse of Elijah (also known as the Revelation of Elijah) and the Gospel of Nicodemus (also known as Acts of Pilate) state that those two witnesses who will appear in times of Antichrist to engage in battle with him are Enoch and Elijah:

^{32}…Elijah and Enoch will come down. They will lay down the flesh of the world, and they will receive their spiritual flesh. They will pursue the son of lawlessness and kill him since he is not able to speak.

— Apocalypse of Elijah, Chapter 5:32

^{3}…I am Enoch, who was translated by the word of God: and this man who is with me, is Elijah the Tishbite, who was translated in a fiery chariot. ^{4}Here we have hitherto been, and have not tasted death, but are now about to return at the coming of Antichrist, being armed with divine signs and miracles, to engage with him in battle, and to be slain by him at Jerusalem, and to be taken up alive again into the clouds, after three days and a half.

— Gospel of Nicodemus, Chapter 20:3–4

Others have proposed Moses, for his ability to turn water into blood and the power to send plagues on the earth (Exodus 7:17-21; 9:13-14; Revelation 11:6). His companion would be Elijah the prophet, predicted to return (Malachi 4:5-6) and who prevented it from raining in Israel in the days of Ahab (1 Kings 17:1; Luke 4:25; James 5:17; Revelation 11:6). These two appeared with Jesus on the Mount of Transfiguration (Matthew 17:1-8; Mark 9:1-8; Luke 9:28-36). Victorinus of Pettau acknowledged the possibility of Moses being the companion of Elijah for the identity of the two witnesses, but he rejects Moses as one of the witnesses and proposes Jeremiah. Therefore, the earliest known espousal of the Moses-Elijah view appears to be in Hilary of Poitiers's Latin commentary on the Gospel of Matthew. Three notable defenses of the Moses-Elijah view are those by William De Burgh (1801-1866), Robert H. Charles, and William Douglas Adamson.

Others have proposed two people who are now unknown to the world who will appear in the future as the witnesses. They may be seen as coming “in the spirit” of the prophets of old. The earliest example of this identification seems to be an alternative interpretation of the witnesses from Francis Woodcock (ca. 1614–1651). Several years later, Richard Hayter (ca. 1611–1684) identifies the witnesses similarly, but not simply as an alternative. Four notable defenses of this view of the two witnesses are those by Donatus Haugg (1900-1943), James Henthorn Todd, Isbon T. Beckwith (1843-1936), and Christine Joy Tan.

=== As symbols of the church ===
The two witnesses have been interpreted as representing the Church or a similar concept. The earliest symbolic interpretation of the two witnesses along these lines is that proposed by the 4th century commentator, Ticonius. He concludes the witnesses represent the church prophesying by means of the Old and New Testaments.

Symbolic interpretations become more prevalent in the literature with the coming of the Reformation. Heinrich Bullinger says that the witnesses are all the faithful preachers during a certain segment of church history. The 1599 Geneva Study Bible has asserted that the two witnesses are the exclusive purview of the church. David Pareus says the witnesses are a succession of individuals, such as teachers or even princes, who uphold true religion.

Later, Matthew Henry's Complete Commentary on the Whole Bible gives one church interpretation as consisting of believing Jews and that of the gentiles. John Gill's Exposition of the Bible interprets the two witnesses as the true Church in counterdistinction to the "antichrist system" of Roman Catholicism.

More recently, some commentators follow the thought of Ticonius and conclude that the witnesses are the Christian church, during a certain period of history. A view along these lines is advocated by Gregory Beale in his commentary on Revelation. A key point of evidence for Beale and others is that the two witnesses are identified as “two lampstands” and this symbol is used in Revelation 1:20 to refer to the “seven churches.”

Similarly, the two witnesses have been identified as Israel and the Christian Church. "The olive trees" signify Israel. The "witness of the Church" is signified by "the two lampstands."

It has also been proposed that the two witnesses are the witnessing church, because Jesus sent out his disciples "two by two". The two witnesses are the true prophetic witness in Revelation (the church), and they serve as the counterpart to the false prophetic witness, the beast from the land, who has two horns like a lamb (Revelation 13:11; cf.16:13; 19:20; 20:10).

Similar to this type of proposal is to see the witnesses as general symbols of Christian testimony. A view along these lines is advocated by Adela Yarbro Collins in her commentary on Revelation.

=== Other views ===
The Church of Jesus Christ of Latter-day Saints believe that the two witnesses will be two prophets who are raised up to the Jews in the modern nation of Israel, possibly two members of their Quorum of the Twelve or their First Presidency, who are considered to be prophets by the church. These two prophets will represent both the ancient Northern and Southern kingdoms of Israel (the two olive trees) and be descendants of the two covenant sons from the tribes of Judah and Joseph (as the two lampstands). Some members have suggested that the martyrdom of Joseph Smith and his brother Hyrum Smith (Assistant President from 1841 to 1844) are prototypes and they represent the future two witnesses (stated in Revelation) who will be sent to Jerusalem and be killed for their testimonies.

In traditional Seventh-day Adventist interpretation, as found in Uriah Smith and Ellen G. White, the two witnesses are the Old and New Testaments. They believed that the French Revolution was the time when the two witnesses were killed. Other historicists also consider the two witnesses in this way.

The Bahá'í Faith identifies the two witnesses as Muhammed, the founder of Islam, and Ali, the son of Abú Tálib. They consider Muhammad as the root and Ali the branch, comparable to Moses and Joshua. They interpret "clothed in sackcloth" to mean that they initially appeared to be of no consequence and without a new revelation because the spiritual principles of Islam would correspond closely with those promulgated in Christianity and Judaism. They identify the "beast" to be the Umayyads, who would wage spiritual war against them. The 1,260 days is interpreted as the 1,260 lunar years since the start of the Islamic calendar, corresponding to the Gregorian year 1844; the year the Millerite movement also predicted the return of Christ. The Bahá'í Faith recognizes the significance of 1844 as the year of the declaration of the Báb, bearing a new message from God and proclaiming the coming of Bahá'u'lláh, the Prophet-Founder of the Bahá'í Faith and promised return of Christ.

Marshall Applewhite and Bonnie Nettles (Do and Ti), the leaders of the UFO religious cult Heaven's Gate, initially claimed to be the two witnesses in the 1970s. According to their interpretation, they would be killed and resurrected before ascending to heaven in a spacecraft. They ultimately rebranded their "assassinations" as symbolic rather than actual death, owing to the ridicule they were subjected to by the media.

== In popular culture ==
The two witnesses play a central role in the supernatural drama television series Sleepy Hollow. The first witness is Ichabod Crane, a Revolutionary War soldier who, after battling with the Horseman of Death (whom he causes to be headless), awakens in Sleepy Hollow in 2013. The second witness is Lieutenant Abbie Mills, a contemporary woman in law enforcement who helps Crane adjust to the 21st century and aids him in battling dæmonic forces. The two witnesses must face 'Seven Tribulations' (although other characters note that the Witnesses are only required to witness the events rather than take action themselves), the first being Moloch, the master of the Horsemen. The second Tribulation is Pandora and her master, an ancient Sumerian god known as the Hidden One. Third was Malcolm Dryfus and Jobe. Although Lieutenant Mills (now Agent Mills of the FBI) loses her soul, there must always be two witnesses, and the mantle passes on to Molly Thomas on her eleventh birthday. Not long thereafter, Molly's older self, going by the name Lara, comes from the future to aid Crane in his battles, thereby assuming the mantle of the witness from her younger self.

In the Left Behind franchise, the two witnesses prophesy at the Wailing Wall in Jerusalem. They are later revealed to be Elijah and Moses, and are killed by the Antichrist Nicolae Carpathia.

== See also ==
- 2300 day prophecy
- Day-year principle
- Events of Revelation (Chapter 11)
- Great Tribulation
- Prophecy of Seventy Weeks
