= The Tell =

- NCIS episode
- Episode no.: Season 9 Episode 18
- Directed by: Tom Wright
- Written by: Gina Lucita Monreal
- Original air date: March 20, 2012

Guest appearances
- Jamie Lee Curtis as Samantha Ryan; Matt Craven as Secretary of the Navy Clayton Jarvis; Sean Astin as Tyler Elliott; William Russ as Philip Wickes; John Prosky as Carl Dalton; Lauren Hodges as Amanda Baylor; Joel Polis as Ronald Ostrowski; Tom Virtue as Frank Satner; J. Claude Deering as Curtis Hubley

Episode chronology
← Previous "Need to Know"	Next → "The Good Son"
- NCIS season 9

"The Tell" is the 18th episode of the ninth season of the American police procedural drama NCIS, and the 204th episode overall. It aired on CBS in the United States on March 20, 2012. The episode is written by Gina Lucita Monreal and directed by Tom Wright, and was seen by 19.05 million viewers.

== Plot ==
Gibbs and Tony are on security detail with the Secretary of the Navy (Matt Craven) at a seminar when a shooting takes place and the Secretary is rushed to the hospital. Gibbs and Dr. Samantha Ryan (Jamie Lee Curtis) work to find out who leaked top secret information. It is revealed that the shooting was staged so that the team can find out where the leak is coming from. They believe that Wickes, a close personal friend of the Secretary and CEO of military contractor Wickes Steel, might be involved. While Ryan believes that Wickes is guilty, Gibbs believes otherwise. As the team investigates further, they track down the hacker responsible for obtaining the top secret information, and find out that the leaked information was just a ruse to distract them. The hacker's real objective was to hack into a secret AUTEC account that was inactive and had accrued over $300 million in interest. Further investigation reveals that Wickes' half brother was responsible for the plot, as he believed the money could have helped save their company from bankruptcy. Meanwhile, Gibbs and Ryan's relationship begins to grow closer.

== Production ==
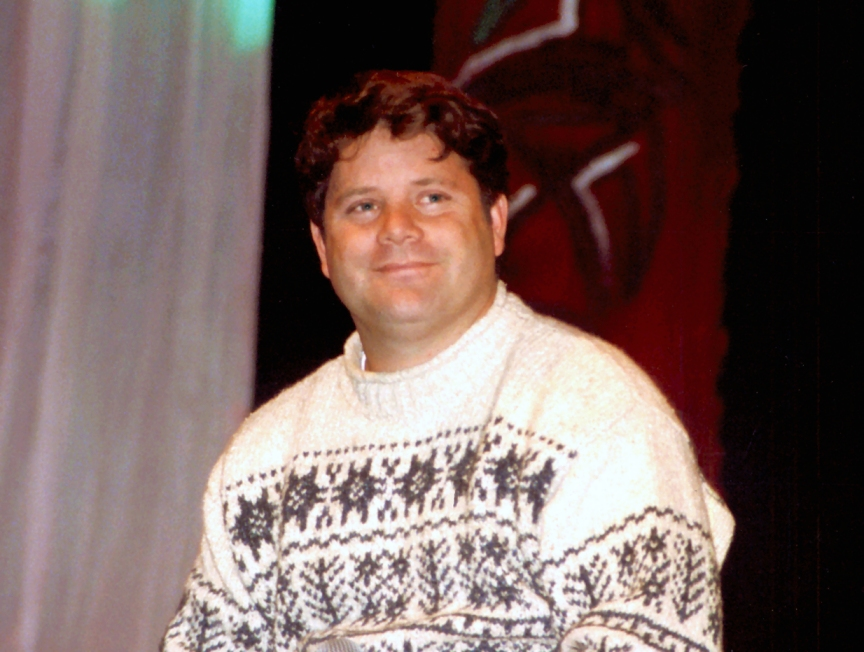
Sean Astin guest starred as Tyler Elliott.

"The Tell" is written by Gina Lucita Monreal and directed by Tom Wright. This is Monreal's second episode on NCIS, the first being "Engaged (Part I)" which aired in November 2011. "I was excited. My second script at NCIS. About the episode, "[Executive producer Gary Glasberg] was thinking a joint NCIS/PsyOps mission, the return of Jamie Lee Curtis’ Dr. Samantha Ryan, and the blooming of Gibbs’ relationship with this intriguing woman". Glasberg told TV Guide "you can't keep [characters] alone forever!", hinting Gibbs and Ryan could evolve a relationship on a private level as well as on a professional level.

Jamie Lee Curtis returns as Dr. Samantha Ryan, first seen in the episode "Psych Out". This is the second episode of the two-episode arch between Gibbs and Ryan. On March 19, 2012, Executive producer Gary Glasberg confirmed that Ryan will recur in future episodes of the season.

Also, Matt Craven is recurring as Secretary of the Navy Clayton Jarvis.

== Reception ==
"The Tell" was seen by 19.05 million live viewers following its broadcast on March 20, 2012, with an 11.9/19 share among all households, and 3.4/10 share among adults aged 18 to 49. A rating point represents one percent of the total number of television sets in American households, and a share means the percentage of television sets in use tuned to the program. In total viewers, "The Tell" easily won NCIS and CBS the night, while the spin-off NCIS: Los Angeles drew second and was seen by 16.17 million viewers. Compared to the last episode "Need to Know", "The Tell" was up a bit in viewers and down in adults 18-49.

Steve Marsi from TV Fanatic gave the episode 4 (out of 5) and stated that "this week's NCIS episode saw the much-anticipated return of Jamie Lee Curtis' Dr. Samantha Ryan, not as an adversary but as a partner - in and away from the field - for Gibbs this time. The joint NCIS and PsyOps operation was compelling from the start, and even though things dragged toward the end and meandered into less interesting territory, it was enjoyable overall".
