= Matthew Settle =

American actor (born 1969)

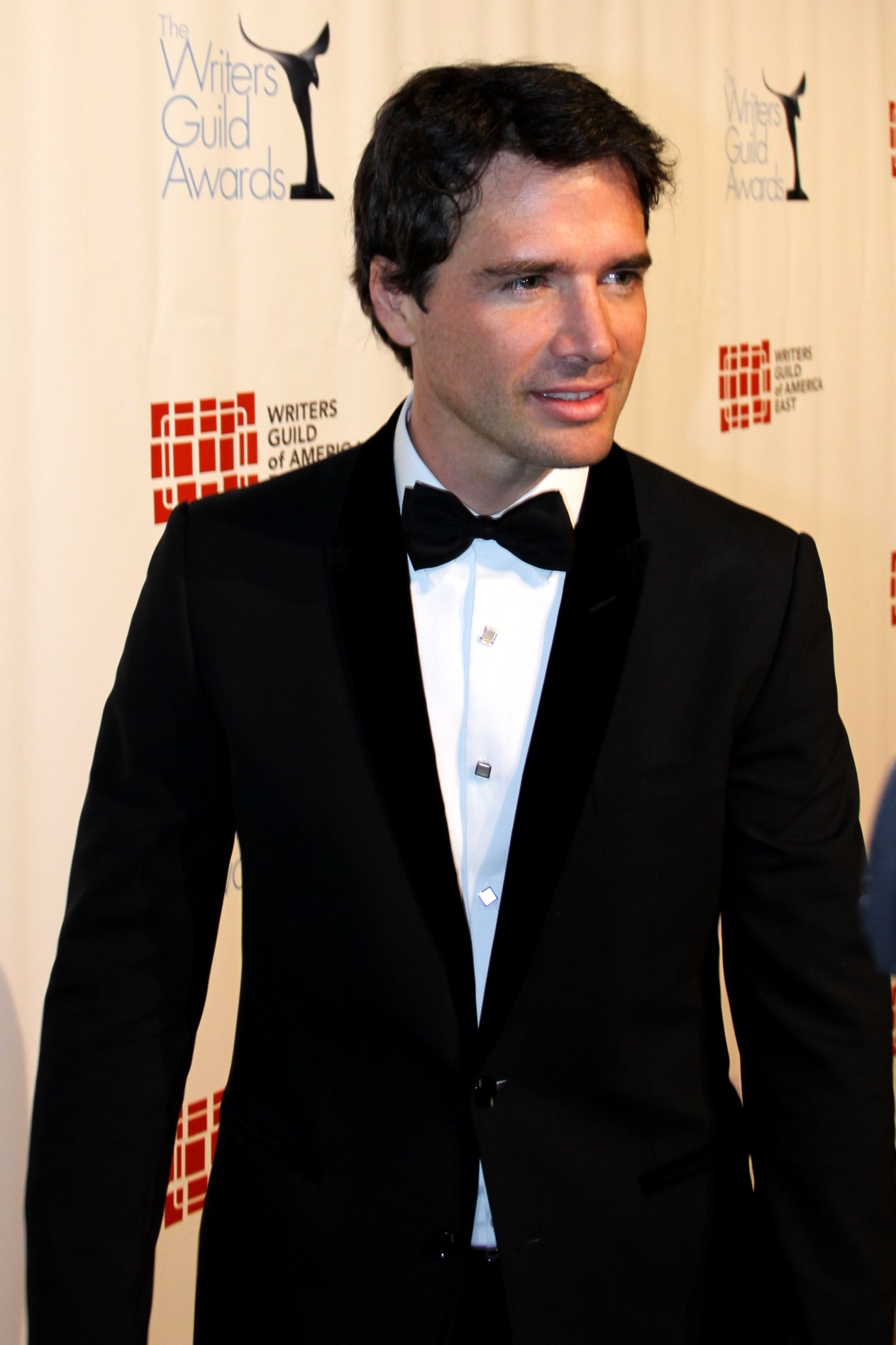
- Settle in 2011
- Born: Jeffrey Matthew Settle; September 17, 1969 (age 57); Hickory, North Carolina, U.S.
- Occupation: Actor
- Years active: 1996–2017, 2026–present
- Spouse: Naama Nativ (m. 2006; div. 2011)
- Children: 1

Jeffrey Matthew Settle (born September 17, 1969) is an American actor. He is known for playing Will Benson in I Still Know What You Did Last Summer, Captain Ronald Speirs on the 2001 HBO miniseries Band of Brothers and Rufus Humphrey on the CW teen drama series Gossip Girl.

== Early life ==
Settle was born in Hickory, North Carolina, the son of Robert, a Baptist minister, and Joan Settle. He is the youngest of six children, having two sisters and three brothers.

== Career ==
Settle made his Broadway debut in a strictly limited engagement in Chicago: The Musical, appearing as Billy Flynn from April 19 through June 13, 2010. He made his feature film debut in I Still Know What You Did Last Summer co-starring alongside Jennifer Love Hewitt, Freddie Prinze Jr., Mekhi Phifer, and Brandy Norwood. He also had a guest appearance in the seventh season of Law & Order: Special Victims Unit as a reporter in the episode "Storm". From 2007 to 2012, Settle portrayed Rufus Humphrey, the father of Dan and Jenny, on the CW teen drama series Gossip Girl. Other past roles include his portrayal of Capt. Ronald Speirs in the HBO miniseries Band of Brothers and his role as Jacob Wheeler in the TNT miniseries Into the West. He also played the part of John in the film Beneath. He played John in the 2006 film The Celestine Prophecy.

== Personal life ==
In 2007, Settle revealed that in 2006, at age 37, he had eloped to marry Israeli actress and model Naama Nativ, with whom he had a child, born in 2009. Settle and Nativ divorced in May 2011.

== Filmography ==
=== Film ===
Year	Title	Role	Notes
1996	Shaughnessy: The Iron Marshal	Tommy Shaughnessy	Television film
1997	What Happened to Bobby Earl?	Tom Stahl	Television film
1997	A Deadly Vision	Detective Max Seagle	Television film
1997	Justice League of America	Guy Gardner / Green Lantern	Television film
1998	I Still Know What You Did Last Summer	Will Benson	
1999	Lansky	Benny "Bugsy" Siegel (ages 17–26)	Television film
1999	Crime in Connecticut: The Story of Alex Kelly	Alex Kelly	Television film
2000	U-571	Ensign Keith Larson	
2000	The In Crowd	Matt Curtis	
2000	Attraction	Matthew	
2002	Divine Secrets of the Ya-Ya Sisterhood	Lieutenant Jack Whitman	
2004	The Mystery of Natalie Wood	Warren Beatty	Television film
2004	A Place Called Home	Hank Ford	Television film
2004	Until the Night	Michael	
2004	Rancid	James Hayson	
2005	Mutig in die neuen Zeiten – Im Reich der Reblaus	Hal Morris	Television film
2006	The Celestine Prophecy	John	
2007	Blue Smoke	Bo Goodnight	Television film
2007	Beneath	John	
2008	The Express: The Ernie Davis Story	John F. Kennedy	
2009	ExTerminators	Dan	
2011	So Undercover	Professor Talloway	
2012	Love Sick Love	Norman	
2013	A Sister's Nightmare	Phil	Television film
2014	Ouija	Anthony Morris	
2014	Paper Angels	Kevin Morrell	
2015	The Faith of Anna Waters	Sam Harris	
2015	Marshall the Miracle Dog	Doc Henry	
2016	The Faith of Anna Waters	Sam Harris	
2017	Valentine	Bono	
2026	Student Film: The Movie	Reeves	

=== Television ===
Year	Title	Role	Notes
2001	Band of Brothers	Captain Ronald Speirs	Miniseries; 6 episodes
2002	ER	Brian Westlake	5 episodes
2003	The Practice	Russell Bakey	3 episodes
2003	CSI: Miami	Art Pickering	Episode: "Death Grip"
2004	Decisive Battles	Himself	Host; 13 episodes
2005	Into the West	Jacob Wheeler	Miniseries; 3 episodes
2005	Law & Order: Special Victims Unit	Jackson Zane	Episode: "Storm"
2006	Brothers and Sisters	Jonathan Sellers	4 episodes
2007	The Wedding Bells	Michael Madison	2 episodes
2007–2012	Gossip Girl	Rufus Humphrey	Main cast; 119 episodes Teen Choice Award for Choice TV: Parental Unit
2016	Criminal Minds: Beyond Borders	Daniel Wolf	1 episode
