= Need to Know (NCIS) =

- NCIS episode
- Episode no.: Season 9 Episode 17
- Directed by: Michelle MacLaren
- Written by: George Schenck & Frank Cardea
- Original air date: February 28, 2012

Guest appearances
- Tamer Hassan as Agah Bayar; Matt Jones as Probationary Agent Ned Dorneget; Katia Winter as Ava Baransky; Adam Kulbersh as Alan Katzenbach; Robin Sachs as MI5 Inspector Andrew Challis; Michael Edwin as TSA Officer Perkins; Erin Beaux as DIA Officer George Roca; Ashton Moio as Michael Reardon; Travis Joe Dixon as Navy Chief Petty Officer Leland Wiley

Episode chronology
← Previous "Psych Out"	Next → "The Tell"
- NCIS season 9

"Need to Know" is the 17th episode of the ninth season of the American police procedural drama NCIS, and the 203rd episode overall. It originally aired on CBS in the United States on February 28, 2012. The episode is written by George Schenck & Frank Cardea and directed by Michelle MacLaren, and was seen by 18.20 million viewers.

In the episode, a Chief Petty Officer is murdered right before Gibbs' eyes when he is about to reveal information connected to an international arms dealer.

== Plot ==
When Chief Petty Officer Wiley is murdered before he can divulge information about infamous arms dealer Agah Bayar, Special agent Leroy Jethro Gibbs is immediately on the case. As he and his team investigate, they discover that Wiley sold top secret information about America's stealth communication network to Bayar. However, Gibbs is then approached by the DIA and ordered to halt the investigation. Gibbs then decides to pursue Bayar's mistress.

Meanwhile, the young and bumbling Probationary agent Ned Dorneget tries to butter up Gibbs in hopes of joining the team. Gibbs decides to send him and Special agent Timothy McGee to pick up the mistress, but it is revealed that she is an SVR agent, and quickly escapes custody. A disgruntled McGee accuses Dorneget of getting seduced by her, but Dorneget counters by revealing that he is gay. Gibbs and Director Leon Vance then deduce that the entire case was a DIA plot, using Wiley as the patsy to leak faulty information to the Russians in order to sabotage their stealth communication research. The plan began to go awry when Wiley was busted for drug possession and tried to leverage a plea bargain by providing information on Bayar, forcing the Russians to kill him to save their operation. Bayar, who was aware of the plan, acted as the middleman while the SVR agent was the courier.

== Production ==
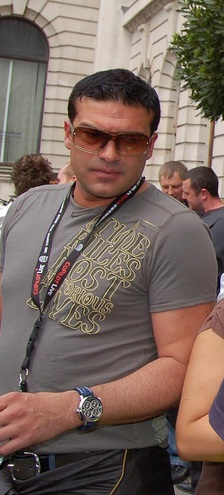
Tamer Hassan guest starred as arms dealer Agah Bayar.

"Need to Know" is written by George Schenck & Frank Cardea and directed by Michelle MacLaren. Schenck and Cardea were given the task of revisiting NCIS agent Ned Dorneget (Matt L. Jones), as the new "probie", by showrunner Gary Glasberg. Dorneget was introduced in the episode "Sins of the Father", which aired in November 2011. This is the first episode of NCIS directed by MacLaren, who has previously worked on shows like "Breaking Bad", together with Jones, "The X-Files" and "The Walking Dead".

The arms dealer in the episode, Agah Bayar (Tamer Hassan), had appeared in the Season 8 episodes "Broken Arrow" and "Kill Screen" and now returned to "[make] a great foil for Gibbs and the team".

== Reception ==
"Need to Know" was seen by 18.20 million live viewers following its broadcast on February 28, 2012, with an 11.3/17 share among all households, and 3.5/9 share among adults aged 18 to 49. A rating point represents one percent of the total number of television sets in American households, and a share means the percentage of television sets in use tuned to the program. In total viewers, "Need to Know" easily won NCIS and CBS the night, beating FOX's American Idol for the first time ever, having 16.11 millions. The spin-off NCIS: Los Angeles drew third and was seen by 15.85 million viewers. Compared to last week's episode "Psych Out", "Need to Know" was down a bit in both viewers and adults 18–49.

Steve Marsi from TV Fanatic gave the episode 4.5 (out of 5) and stated that "last night was terrific [...]. The crime under investigation was both serious enough to keep you interested and detest the bad guy(s) but not so serious that the team couldn't let loose at times", and "overall, an excellent episode from start to finish, blending just the right portions of all the things we've grown to love about the show. I hope we get more like it coming down the home stretch of this season".
