= Shaughnessy: The Iron Marshal =

1996 TV film

Shaughnessy: The Iron Marshal (aka Louis L'Amour's Shaughnessy) is a 1996 American Western television film aired on CBS. It is based on the 1979 Louis L'Amour novel, Shaughnessy. The movie starred Matthew Settle as title character Tommy Shaughnessy, also starring Bo Hopkins, Stuart Whitman, Linda Kozlowski, and Michael Jai White, and was directed by Michael Rhodes. The screenplay was written by William Blinn, who "served the same double duty" on Shaughnessy that he previously did for Disney's Davy Crockett miniseries in the 1980s.

The plot of the movie, following that of the novel, involves "a tough Irish New Yorker who goes west to a troubled Kansas town, where he becomes the new marshal." Shaughnessy: The Iron Marshal was developed as a prospective TV series for CBS, but went no further than the TV movie. The movie was filmed in part at the California State Railroad Museum in Sacramento, and on the Sierra Railroad in Tuolumne County, California.

It was released on DVD in 2006.
