= Anaphylaxis (film) =

2009 British art house film

Anaphylaxis is a 2009 British art house feature film written and directed by Ayman Mokhtar and starring Guy Defferary, Katia Winter, Jenna Brook and Frazer Douglas. The story is about a doctor allergic to the human touch who finds his salvation in writings tattooed on the body of a dead poet. The film has a prosodic visual style, where shots follow certain durational rules to create a visual metrical rhythm (similar to that of poetry) for each scene in the film.

== The Making of Anaphylaxis ==
Anaphylaxis was filmed in Winter 2007 at the historic Ealing Studios in London, England. The film was shot entirely on a green screen and on mute. The film's world (visual and auditory) was constructed in a post-production process spanning two years. Completed in Autumn 2009, the first public screening (World Premiere) was at the 33rd São Paulo International Film Festival (Official Selection) in October/November 2009.

== Plot ==
A successful doctor, content with life, develops a strange illness – anaphylaxis, a severe allergy to human skin. He tries to defy his illness, but his life is turned upside down by his inability to touch people. He cannot function professionally, socially or intimately with his fiancée, whom he eventually loses. Then he discovers that dead bodies do not trigger his illness. He withdraws from life around him to work as a pathologist, dealing only with dead bodies. Life is calm until he encounters a woman’s dead body covered from neck to toe with writing.

Intrigued, he starts to read.

She was a poet. Imprisoned as a wife and mother, she suffered postnatal depression. Writing was her solace, but she sought escape so much it became a dangerous obsessive compulsive disorder. They locked her in a psychiatric hospital to recover. When released, she was told not to touch a pen again. But she did – to end it all by writing her story on her skin, dying as a result.

Reading her story, the doctor discovers a profound bond between his experiences of solitude and those recounted by the poet in her tattooed words. The dead poet becomes the doctor’s only chance for a human connection as he reaches to her across the boundaries of death.

== Prosodic Cinema Style in Anaphylaxis ==
As a narrative film, Anaphylaxis observes shot continuity, content and arrangement necessary for storytelling. However, the film also observes a set of strict shot-length rules to create a defined rhythm for each of its scenes. In a prosodic cinematic style, shots in Anaphylaxis come together according to defined shot-length rules in order to compose durational patterns (rhythmic units). The shots in these rhythmic units mimic in their length pattern some of the known metrical feet of poetry such as iamb (short-long), anapest (short-short-long) and trochee (long-short).

As in poetry, this prosodic cinema style uses each Shot (Syllable) with the adjacent one(s) to form a small rhythmic unit called the Step (Foot), which is placed into a larger metric unit called the Run (Meter/Line), which is repeated to flow successively over time in the larger unit of the Scene (Stanza) to make up the characteristic metrical rhythm in the Film (Poem). So, in Anaphylaxis a Step is a true “rhythmic unit” rather than a mere “rhythmic gesture”. In other words, the Steps are projected as pulses on the underlying Run, creating a structure of temporal regularity, a metrical rhythm. This rhythm/pattern of “Steps on a Run” mimics the metrical rhythm of poetry. For example, a cinematic iambic pentameter in Anaphylaxis means that five iambic Steps come together to form a Run i.e. the meter (the Run) contains ten shots arranged in five similar short-long rhythmic units (Steps). Anaphylaxis visually expresses its entire narrative in this prosodic cinematic style, exploiting the inherent rhythmic quality of film as a time-dependent medium.

== See also ==
Anaphylaxis, the disorder depicted in the film.
