= The Good Son (NCIS) =

- NCIS episode
- Episode no.: Season 9 Episode 19
- Directed by: Terrence O'Hara
- Written by: Nicole Mirante-Matthews & Scott Williams
- Original air date: March 27, 2012

Guest appearances
- Paula Newsome as Jackie Vance; Jocko Sims as Michael Thomas; Don Stark as Marty Fiero; Eden Riegel as Meredith Bilson; Aaron Perilo as Petty Officer Third Class Brian Smith; Patrick Cohen as Petty Officer Third Class Dan Garscott; Richard Reid as Navy Seaman Robert Epplund; Lawrence Adimora as Navy Seaman Jacob Pierway; Akinsola Aribo as Jared Vance; Kiara Muhammad as Kayla Vance; Andy Shephard as Navy Seaman Mark Hill

Episode chronology
← Previous "The Tell"	Next → "The Missionary Position"
- NCIS season 9

"The Good Son" is the 19th episode of the ninth season of the American police procedural drama NCIS, and the 205th episode overall. It aired on CBS in the United States on March 27, 2012. The episode is written by Nicole Mirante-Matthews & Scott Williams and directed by Terrence O'Hara, and was seen by 18.67 million viewers.

== Plot ==
In the episode, NCIS Director Leon Vance is personally involved in a case when Gibbs suspects his brother-in-law, Michael Thomas, to be the killer of a Petty Officer. When trying to find the victim's girlfriend, they discover that she had been sleeping with another sailor from the same ship and apprehend him. Both sailors were friends and had gotten in a fight over the girlfriend. However, Gibbs still suspects Michael is guilty, due to his criminal record, but Vance maintains that even though Michael had a tough childhood, he is still innocent. When more evidence implicating the second sailor surfaces, Vance takes Michael back to his house, though his wife is reluctant to accept Michael due to his past. Further investigation reveals that the sailor was innocent, and that the victim had been involved in an illegal gambling den that was scamming its players. Fingerprints reveal that Michael was involved in the gambling ring. Vance confronts Michael with this information, and Michael admits his involvement, and that he accidentally killed the victim when he accused him of cheating him out of his money. Vance, tired of Michael's repeated failures and lies, finally but reluctantly turns his back on him and has him arrested.

== Production ==
"The Good Son" was written by Nicole Mirante-Matthews and Scott Williams and directed by Terrance O'Hara. The episode centers around Director Leon Vance (Rocky Carroll), including his family. "In the case of NCIS Director Leon Vance, it’s generally accepted that he’s a tight-lipped, no-nonsense administrator, who can be downright adversarial with Gibbs. But there’s also great complexity and compassion always bubbling right beneath the surface. And in this episode, we leapt at the chance to explore that", the writers said.

Jocko Sims portrays Leon Vance's brother-in-law, Michael Thomas. "In this story, we had the opportunity to introduce [Vance's] Achilles’ Heel: His brother-in-law Michael Thomas. Michael represents a character we’re all familiar with. What family doesn’t have someone who never quite lives up to expectations? Someone you love unconditionally, even when they keep breaking your heart? Vance is not immune to this dynamic, but how he deals with it reveals a side of him we’ve never quite seen. Michael’s more than a cross to bear – He’s a labor of love. And Vance walks a delicate tightrope between his beliefs and his ideals, his instincts compromised by what he sees versus what he wants to see".

== Reception ==
"The Good Son" was seen by 18.67 million live viewers following its broadcast on March 27, 2012, with an 11.3/18 share among all households, and 3.5/10 share among adults aged 18 to 49. A rating point represents one percent of the total number of television sets in American households, and a share means the percentage of television sets in use tuned to the program. In total viewers, "The Good Son" easily won NCIS and CBS the night, while the spin-off NCIS: Los Angeles drew third and was seen by 14.75 million viewers. Compared to last week's episode "The Tell", "The Good Son" was down a bit in viewers and up in adults 18-49.

Steve Marsi from TV Fanatic gave the episode 4.5 (out of 5) and stated that "nine seasons in, NCIS still has a great way of peeling back new layers of characters you thought you knew, casting them in a different light or offering a different perspective on what makes them tick. The rare Vance episode always keeps things interesting in large part because you never know quite what to think of the guy. He's head of NCIS, yet simultaneously not part of the fabric of the team".
