= Love Sick Love =

- Directed by: Christian Charles
- Written by: Ryan Oxford
- Produced by: Anne Estonilo; Christian Charles
- Starring: Matthew Settle; Katia Winter; Charlotte Rae; Jim Gaffigan; M. Emmet Walsh
- Cinematography: J.P. Lipa
- Edited by: Kyle Gilman
- Music by: John Swihart
- Release date: April 19, 2013
- Running time: 84 minutes
- Country: United States
- Language: English

Love Sick Love is a 2013 American thriller written by Ryan Oxford, directed by Christian Charles and starring Matthew Settle, Katia Winter, Charlotte Rae, Jim Gaffigan and M. Emmet Walsh.

== Cast ==
- Matthew Settle as Norman
- Katia Winter as Dori
- M. Emmet Walsh as Ed
- Charlotte Rae as Edna
- Jim Gaffigan as Andrew Blythe

== Release ==
The film was released on April 19, 2013.

== Reception ==
Sarah Stewart of the New York Post gave the film a negative review and wrote, “it’s ultimately hard to care too much about a caddish protagonist like Norman — or, for that matter, about the clichéd ‘women are crazy!’ sentiment that hums nastily under the antics of Dori’s unorthodox family gathering.”

The Hollywood Reporter also gave the film a negative review: “This darkly comic horror tale strains too hard for both laughs and shocks.”
