= Les Cent Contes drolatiques =

Collection of tales by Honoré de Balzac

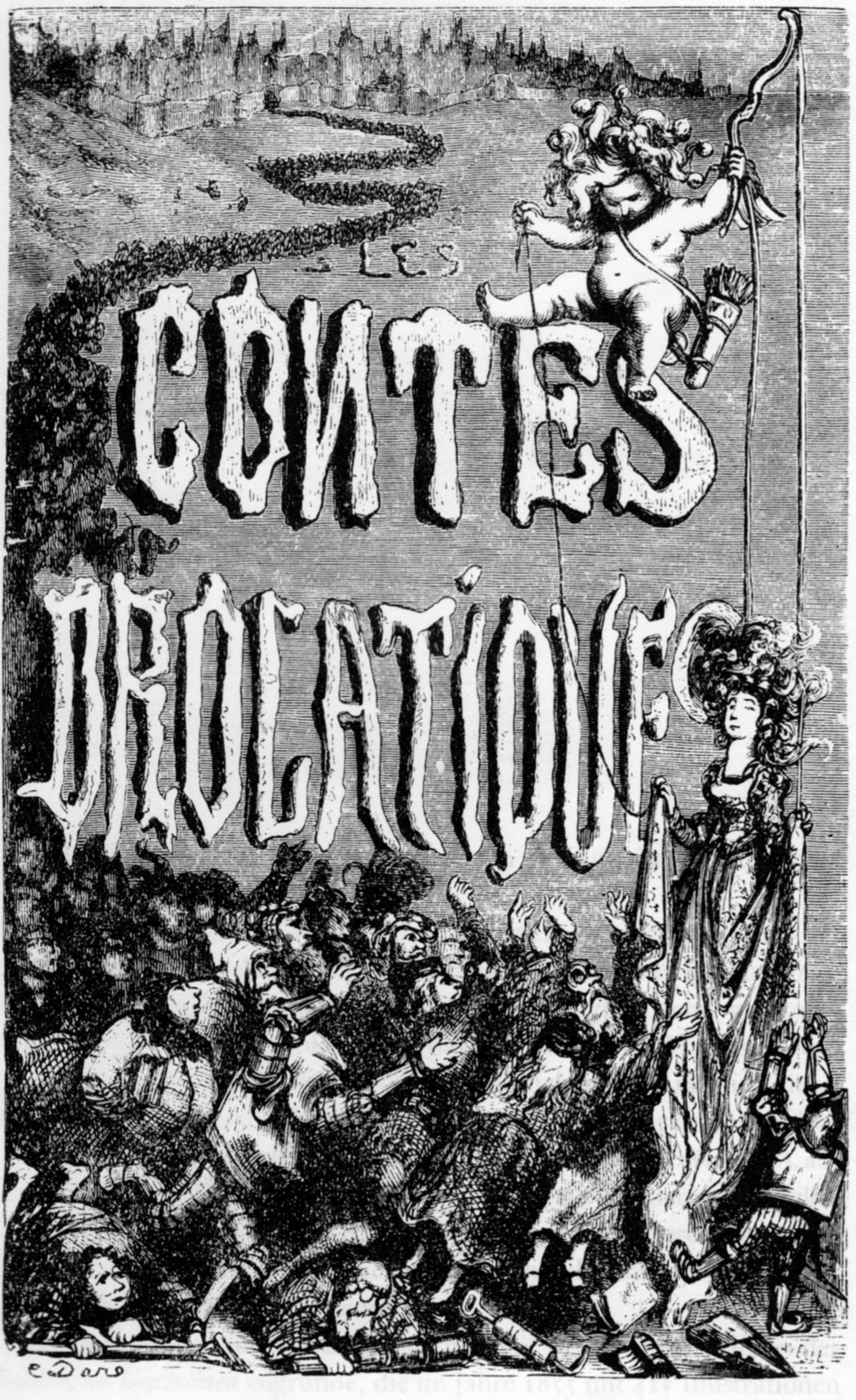
- Frontispiece by Gustave Doré for Les Contes Drolatiques, c. 1832
- Editor: Charles Gosselin and Edmond Werdet
- Author: Honoré de Balzac
- Language: French
- Genre: Short story collection
- Publication date: 1832–1837
- Publication place: France
- Media type: Print (hardback & paperback)

Les Cent Contes drolatiques (French, 'The Hundred Facetious Tales'), usually translated Droll Stories, is a collection of humorous short stories by the French writer Honoré de Balzac, based on Giovanni Boccaccio's The Decameron and influenced by François Rabelais. The stories are written in pastiche Renaissance French; although the title promises a hundred, only thirty were published, in groups of ten in 1832, 1833, and 1837.

== Objectives and themes ==
Balzac projected a hundred Contes drolatiques, basing his title on that of Antoine de la Sale's Les Cent Nouvelles Nouvelles. He was acutely conscious of the French heritage of the conte; he probably wrote his Théorie du conte (Theory of the Short Story) as an introduction to the Contes drolatiques in 1851 or early 1852. Set in medieval and Renaissance France, the Contes drolatiques seek to recall to the reader a golden age of French national character, before it was tainted by over-analysis and what Balzac himself refers to as hypocritical prudery. They also use the remote setting, as well as the distancing afforded by the archaic language, which combines startling directness with circumlocation, to treat moral issues and political issues of the time of their composition. Balzac wrote to his future wife, Countess Hańska, describing them as an "arabesque" he was weaving around his contemporary novels and stories, Human Comedy, and predicting that they would be his "principal title to fame in days to come". Some stories relate in a ribald manner to books in the Human Comedy, and the stories as a whole present a sexually oriented, sometimes obscene commentary on history and its conventional representations.

In his preface to the first edition of ten tales in 1832, Balzac compares his tales to Boccaccio's Decameron. The prologue to the tales sets the tone while also invoking Rabelais: "This is a book of the highest flavour, full of right hearty merriment, spiced to the palate of the illustrious and very precious tosspots and drinkers, to whom our worthy compatriot, the eternal honour of Touraine, François Rabelais, addressed himself."

== Language ==
The collection bears the subtitle Colligez ez abbayes de Touraine et mis en lumiere par le sieur de Balzac pour l'esbattement des pantagruelistes et non aultres ('collected from the abbeys of Touraine and put forward by the Sieur de Balzac for the delight of Pantagruelists and not of others'). The stories are written in a pastiche of early French, which has been characterised as "a barrage of archaism" and "intentionally opaque". In addition to archaisms and archaised spellings, it includes both learned words and invented words; Balzac referred to it as a languaige babilefique ('Babelific lingo'). This creates distancing, but the stories are not situated in any particular time, evoking an undefined golden age of France. Balzac's stated aim was to write in a purely French idiom free of the artifice of foreign terms: ung françois pour luy seul, oultre les mots bizarres ... phrazes d'oultre mer et jargons hespagnioles advenuz par le faict des estrangiers ("a French language for itself alone, without the bizarre words[,] ...overseas words and bits of Spanish jargon attached to it through the actions of foreigners"). In advertising for the third group of stories in 1837, he added that he wished to avoid affronts to modesty by using a still innocent form of the language: la forme de son linguayge aduers le temps où les mots ne auoyent point mauluoyse senteur ("the form of [the author's] language from the time when words had no bad meaning at all").

== Publication history ==
Balzac began work on the Contes drolatiques as an outgrowth of satirical articles he was writing in 1830; "La Belle Impéria", the first, was based on an article titled "L'Archevêque" and first appeared after some modifications to its scandalous content, in June 1831 in the Revue de Paris. Balzac then published three groups of ten in 1832, 1833, and 1837, with the Paris publishers Charles Gosselin and Edmond Werdet. The 1832 group is permeated by delight, set in a world of the immediate satisfaction of desires, with humanity as a creature among others and sex as an expression of nature among others. The 1833 group grow increasingly dark, permeated by frustration and turning increasingly on characters being duped and tormented. The final group, published after periods of self-doubt and the destruction of some drafts in a fire, show more ironic references to contemporary life and to the complex plotting the series had sought to avoid; some of the stories appear novelistic.

=== Illustrations ===
An 1855 edition with illustrations by Gustave Doré is among the artist's most notable book illustrations. The Contes drolatiques have also been illustrated by Albert Robida, Albert Dubout, and in some of his last completed work, Mervyn Peake.

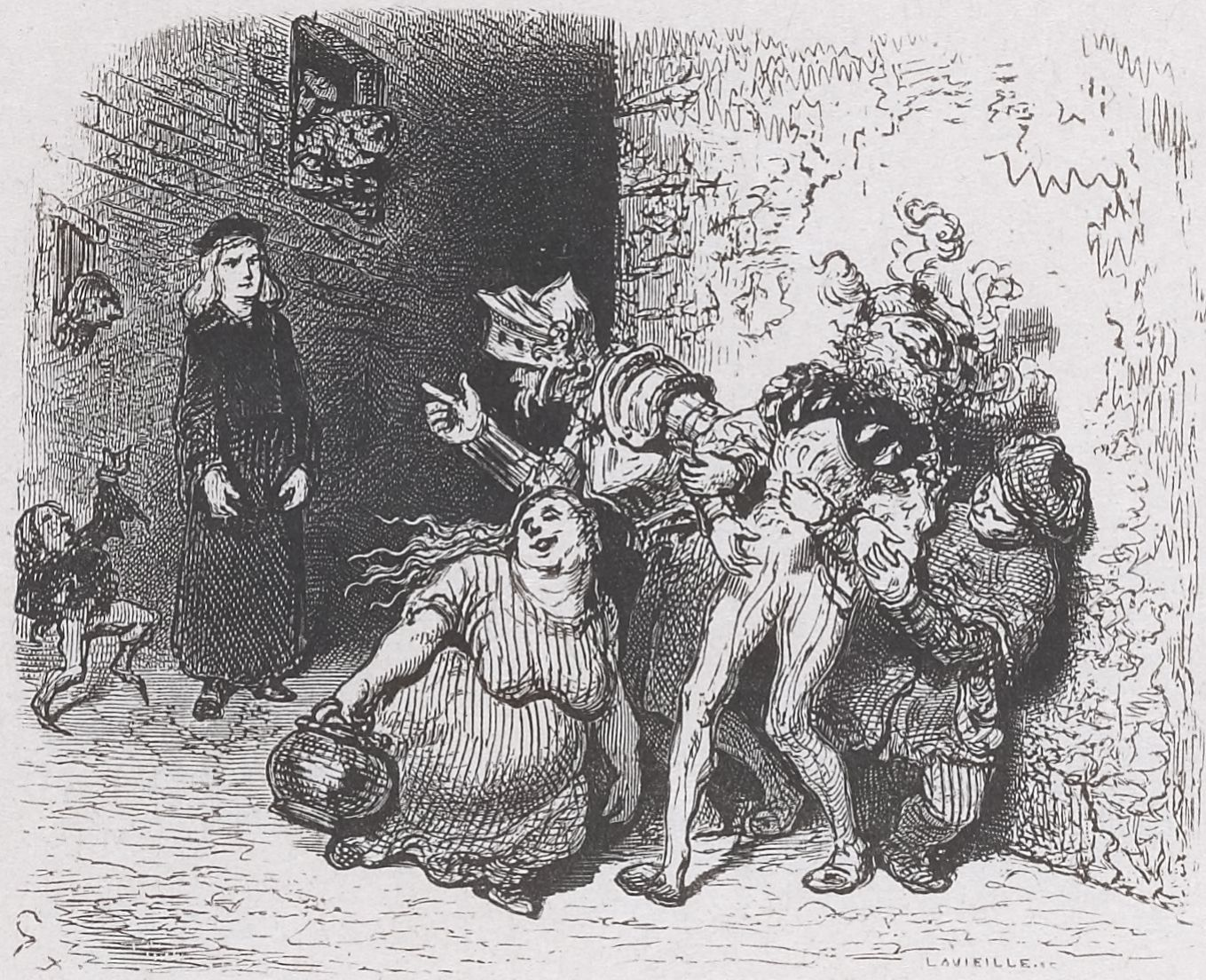
A priest in the bad part of town, illustrated by Gustave Doré

== Reception ==
The stories were not well received and are less known than Balzac's other works. George Sand termed them "indecent"; a critic called them "tales in which all the lusts of the flesh are unleashed, satisfied and left to run riot amid a bacchanalia of flushed Priapi"; Alphonse de Lamartine described them as "futile, somewhat cynical volumes". In addition, the conte was fashionable when the first group were published, but taste began to turn against it by 1833.

Since Balzac's death, critics have been intrigued by the contrasts between the Contes drolatiques and the novels Balzac was writing in the same period, Louis Lambert and Séraphîta. Roland Chollet has argued that his humorous works "served Balzac as an experimental space", and for Stefan Zweig, such disparate writings carried out simultaneously "[could] be explained only by his desire to test his own genius", thereby establishing the foundations for his Human Comedy like an architect "calculat[ing] and check[ing] the dimensions and stresses" of a projected building. Some have judged them underappreciated within his works.

== Historical characters ==
In writing the tales, Balzac was inspired by many historical figures. One story is about Scipion Sardini, Count of Chaumont (1526–1609), banker to Henry III and Catherine de' Medici and the owner of the Château de Chaumont, who in "La Chière nuictée d'amour" falls hopelessly in love with the wife of the Parisian lawyer Pierre des Avenelles, the affair taking place against the background of the preparations for the Amboise conspiracy. The protagonists who become entangled in racy situations in "Le Péché véniel" are the Seigneur de Rochecorbon, a member of the House of Amboise; the Count of Montsoreau; and Jeanne de Craon. In the first story, "La belle Impéria", the Bishop of Chur, secretary to the Archbishop of Bordeaux, is seduced and threatened with excommunication for committing sins of the flesh.

== Contents ==
This list is that of the 13th edition by Garnier Frères, Paris 1924. Each group of ten is framed by a prologue and an epilogue, and the first edition also included an Avertissement du Libraire in which Balzac addressed the reader; this is reprinted in the publisher's 5th (1855) and subsequent editions.

=== First group ===
- "La belle Impéria"
- "Le Péché véniel"
- "La Mye du Roy"
- "L'Héritier du Diable"
- "Les Ioyeulsetez du roy Loys le unziesme"
- "La Connestable"
- "La pucelle de Thilhouze"
- "Le Frère d'armes"
- "Le Curé d'Azay-le-rideau"
- "L'Apostrophe"

=== Second group ===
- "Les trois Clercs de Saint-Nicholas"
- "Le Ieusne de Françoys premier"
- "Les bons Proupos des religieuses de Poissy"
- "Comment feut basty le chasteau d'Azay"
- "La faulse Courtizane"
- "Le Dangier d'estre trop coquebin"
- "La Chière nuictée d'amour"
- "Le Prosne du ioyeulx curé de Meudon"
- "Le Succube"
- "Desespérance d'amour"

=== Third group ===
- '"Persévérance d'amour"
- "D'ung iusticiard qui ne se remembroyt les chouses"
- "Sur le Moyne Amador, qui feut ung glorieux Abbé de Turpenay"
- "Berthe la repentie"
- "Comment la belle Fille de Portillon quinaulda son iuge"
- "Cy est demonstré que la Fortune est touiours femelle"
- "D'ung paouvre qui avait nom le Vieulx-par-chemins"
- "Dires incongrus de trois pèlerins"
- "Naifveté"
- "La belle Impéria mariée"

== Adaptations ==
Four stories from the collection were the basis for the 2021 comic book Les Contes Drolatiques by Paul and Gaëtan Brizzi.
