= Crime in Connecticut: The Story of Alex Kelly =

The Return of Alex Kelly
- Directed by: Ted Kotcheff
- Written by: Joe Cacaci
- Produced by: Jan Peter Meyboom
- Starring: Matthew Settle; Cassidy Rae; Barry Flatman; Wanda Cannon
- Release date: March 16, 1999
- Country: Canada
- Language: English

Crime in Connecticut: The Story of Alex Kelly (also known as The Return of Alex Kelly) is based on the life of Alex Kelly. It was released on March 16, 1999.

== Plot ==
Carrie Roberts is a bright high school student, looking forward to graduation with her friends. One night, she goes to a friend's party where she meets Alex Kelly, a handsome athlete at another high school. When Carrie decides to head home, Alex offers to take her seeing that they live close by. She normally doesn't get into cars with boys, but the weather is cold and Alex is well-mannered and not intimidating. During the drive, Carrie is shocked when he tries to kiss her, but she pushes him away. He then drives down to the end of their street and then begins to assault her. He forces her into the back and rapes her. Afterward, he threatens to kill her if she tells anyone. Carrie confides in her sister who tells their parents, who then contact Alex's parents. When asked about the rape, Alex flat out denies raping Carrie and his parents believe him. Carrie then falls into despair and at first, does not want to press charges, but changes her mind when she learns that Alex raped another girl.

Alex is arrested, but his parents bail him out. The community grows uneasy with Alex and the high school forbids him to come onto the campus, therefore they send his diploma early. His parents believe that their son is not a rapist and that they will fight for him. On the day that the trial is supposed to start, Carrie is shocked to learn that Alex, with the help of his parents, fled the country to Europe. Over the next several years, the police force dedicate their time to locate Alex and bring him back. Carrie, meanwhile, begins her recovery process and goes on to college. She meets and starts dating a handsome student and they become engaged. Carrie, however, still suffers from the ordeal which results in nightmares about Alex.

In Europe, Alex has evaded the police forces in some countries and settles in Sweden. He meets a waitress and moves in with her. One night, he gets a call from his parents and they tell him that his older brother Christopher Kelly had died. The American police in Connecticut are able to track the phone call and contact the Swedish police. Alex is brought back to the United States after being on the run for seven years.

Before the trial, Carrie's lawyer says he will fight for her and make sure that Alex goes to jail. Alex's lawyer says he will make sure the charges are dropped. During the trial, Carrie has to recall the difficult moments of the rape. Alex, on the other hand, denies every accusation against him. The jury nonetheless finds Alex guilty.

Carrie finally recovers from the nightmarish ordeal and settles down with her husband.

== Cast ==
- Matthew Settle as Alex Kelly
- Cassidy Rae as Carrie Roberts
- Barry Flatman as Joe Kelly
- Wanda Cannon as Phyllis Roberts
- Jeff Topping as Chris Kelly
- Ron White as Bruce Hudock
- Joel Keller as Craig Warren
- Allan Royal as Mark Roberts
- Ron Lea as Mr. Sherman, Alex's Attorney
- Natalie Radford as Anna Carlsson
- R.H. Thomson as Ray Marcassi
- Margot Kidder as Melanie Kelly
- Marni Thompson as Erica
- Kristin Booth as Ashley Roberts
- Andrew Tarbet as Andrew Roberts
