= Incubus (disambiguation) =

An incubus is a male demon that has sexual intercourse with sleeping women.

Incubus may also refer to:

== Film ==
- Incubus (1966 film), a film in Esperanto starring William Shatner
- Incubus (2006 film), a horror film starring Tara Reid
- The Incubus (1982 film), a horror film starring John Cassavetes
- François Sagat's Incubus, a 2011/2012 gay pornographic film, and directorial debut for François Sagat

== Music ==
- Incubus (band), an American alternative rock band from California
- Opprobrium (band), American death metal band from Louisiana originally known as Incubus
- "Incubus", a song by British neo-progressive rock band Marillion from 1984's Fugazi (album)

== Other ==
- The Incubus, a 1915 novel by Marjorie Benton Cooke
- Incubus (Berto novel), a 1964 novel by Giuseppe Berto
- Incubus (Russell novel), a 1976 novel by Ray Russell, basis for the 1981 film
- The Incubus, a nickname given to radio executive John Hayes by Howard Stern when the two were together at WNBC
- Incubus, a character from DC Comics

== See also ==
- Succubus (disambiguation)
