= The Year I Started Masturbating =

2023 Swedish film by Erika Wasserman

- Film poster
- Swedish: Året jag slutade prestera och började onanera
- Directed by: Erika Wasserman
- Written by: Christin Magdu
- Based on: Hallongrottan by Sandra Dahlén
- Starring: Katia Winter; Jesper Zuschlag; Nour El-Refai; Vera Carlbom; Hannes Fohlin
- Cinematography: Niels Buchholzer
- Edited by: Oskar Blondell; Henrik Källberg
- Music by: Matti Bye; Anders af Klintberg
- Production company: Gimme a Break
- Distributed by: Scanbox Entertainment
- Release date: October 21, 2022
- Running time: 101 minutes
- Country: Sweden
- Languages: Swedish; Danish

The Year I Started Masturbating (Swedish: Året jag slutade prestera och började onanera) is a 2022 Swedish comedy drama film released on October 21, 2022. The film features Katia Winter, Jesper Zuschlag, Nour El-Refai, Vera Carlbom and Hannes Fohlin.

== Cast ==
- Katia Winter as Hanna
- Jesper Zuschlag as Morten
- Henrik Dorsin as Staffan
- Nour El Refai as Carolin
- Vera Carlbom as Liv
- Pablo Leiva Wenger as Ali
- Hannes Fohlin as Adam
- Sara Shirpey as Asrin
- Bahar Pars as Leyla
- Albin Grenholm as Petter
- Siw Erixon as Eva
- Antonio Di Ponziano as Marco
- David Wiberg as Ola
- Disa Ostrand as Louise
- Happy Jankell as Servitor
- Hulda Sveindís Jóhannesdóttir as Sangkursledare

== Reception ==
Avinash Ramachandran of Cinema Express rated the film 2.5/5 stars. A critic from Sveriges Television rated the film three out of five stars.

The film was reviewed by Jan Lumholdt for Cineuropa and Marshall Shaffer for Decider.

=== Accolades ===
Date	Award	Category	Recipients	Result	Ref.
2023	58th Guldbagge Awards	Best Actress in a Leading Role	Katia Winter	Nominated	
