= Alex Kelly (rapist) =

American convicted rapist

- Born: May 8, 1967 (age 59)
- Conviction: Rape (2 counts)
- Penalty: 16 years imprisonment

Alex Kelly (born May 8, 1967) is an American convicted rapist.

== Early life ==
Alex Kelly is the son of Melanie Reisdorf Kelly, a travel agent, and Joe Kelly, a plumber. He grew up in the Noroton Heights section of Darien, Connecticut. In 1986, he graduated from Darien High School.

His older brother, Christopher, died of a drug overdose in 1991 while Kelly was on the run. His younger brother, Russell, died in 2004 in a car accident in Yellowstone National Park, while Kelly was incarcerated.

== Crimes ==
Kelly was charged with committing two rapes within a four-day period in Darien, Connecticut, in February 1986. He was charged first with the rape of a 16-year-old Stamford girl, and then with the rape of a teenager in Darien. In one of the rapes, according to the police, he encountered a girl who lived near him and offered her a ride home from a party. He was later also charged with drug possession and two counts of kidnapping.

Before his trial was due to begin on February 16, 1987, Kelly fled the United States and spent the next eight years on the run, mostly in Europe but also in North Africa and the Middle East. Kelly's parents allegedly supported him financially during this eight-year period, although they may have been unaware of his exact location. Law enforcement authorities suspected that the parents had been in contact with their son and, on at least one occasion, raided the parents' house in an attempt to find evidence of Kelly's location or their assistance to him.

On July 18, 1994, the Connecticut State Police discovered photos in the Kelly home of Alex with his parents in Europe the previous year. His parents were charged with obstruction, after which Kelly surrendered in Switzerland. He was extradited to the United States on rape and kidnapping charges. Several lesser counts were excluded, as they were not specifically listed in the extradition treaty between the two nations. While out on bail, Kelly was allowed by the court to take classes at Norwalk Community College. Kelly faced two trials in 1997. After the first was declared a mistrial, the second resulted in his conviction for the first rape and a sentence of 16 years in prison. He pleaded no contest to the second rape and was sentenced to an additional 10 years in prison (sentence to run concurrently with the 16-year sentence).

In 2005, after having served eight years of his 16-year sentence, Kelly appeared before a Connecticut parole board; his bid for release was rejected. At the hearing Kelly apologized many times saying he was "hypercompetitive" and self-centered, and that he had finally realized that the world was bigger than him.

On November 24, 2007, Kelly was released from prison on good behavior. He is required to serve 10 years probation, perform 200 hours of community service, pay a $10,000 fine, and register with the Connecticut sex offender registry. Kelly has claimed that, while in prison, he earned a bachelor's degree in economics and Third-World development.

He has since worked as a skydiving instructor. When his history was publicized, Kelly pulled his business from Harriman-and-West Airport in North Adams, Massachusetts.

== Portrayals in the media ==
Kelly's story was recounted in an episode of Dominick Dunne's Court TV series Dominick Dunne's Power, Privilege, and Justice. Crime in Connecticut: The Story of Alex Kelly (also known as The Return of Alex Kelly), is based on Alex Kelly. The Kelly case was also featured in an episode of A&E Network's series American Justice and featured on ABC's news magazine show, Turning Point, whose segment title was "Fugitive Son: The Hunt for Alex Kelly." Vanity Fair Confidential aired an episode entitled "The Fugitive Son" on January 23, 2017. Kelly's case was also featured on Unsolved Mysteries, in which one of the alleged rapes is re-enacted to ascertain if the vehicle he was driving would enable the rape as described by the victim.
