= Psych Out (NCIS) =

- NCIS episode
- Episode no.: Season 9 Episode 16
- Directed by: Dennis Smith
- Written by: Gary Glasberg & Reed Steiner
- Original air date: February 21, 2012

Guest appearances
- Jamie Lee Curtis as Dr. Samantha Ryan; Wendy Makkena as Dr. Rachel Cranston; Spencer Locke as Amber Banks; Kirsten Nelson as Beth Banks; Brandon Olive as Military Liaison Ross Kilmer; Aubrey Deeker as Former Navy Commander Brian Mitchell; Rob Mayes as Former Marine 2nd Lieutenant Kyle Baxter; Samm Levine as NCIS Agent Cashier Fred Seymour; Robert Craighead as DEA Agent Simon Lewis; Richard Gleason as Navy Reservist Dr. Robert Banks; Jack Guzman as Wade; Faruq Tauheed as Derek

Episode chronology
← Previous "Secrets"	Next → "Need to Know"
- NCIS season 9

"Psych Out" is the 16th episode of the ninth season of the American police procedural drama NCIS, and the 202nd episode overall. It originally aired on CBS in the United States on February 21, 2012. The episode is written by Gary Glasberg & Reed Steiner and directed by Dennis Smith, and was seen by 19.29 million viewers.

In the episode, a Navy Reservist from Pentagon's Psy Ops division is shot during his own suicide, making Leroy Jethro Gibbs (Mark Harmon) work with a psychiatrist to solve the case.

== Plot ==
Dr. Robert Banks, a prominent Navy psychologist, is found dead from an apparent suicide, and happens to be one of Dr. Cranston's patients. Cranston believes that Banks was murdered, and the team finds evidence that her suspicions are correct. They then begin investigating Banks' work as a psychological warfare agent. However, the Psy Ops Director, Dr. Samantha Ryan, is reluctant to give Gibbs any useful information, however she does point Gibbs towards Former Marine Kyle Baxter, who Dr. Banks had discharged from the navy for psychological issues. Upon investigation into Banks' life, the team discover that someone was using PsyOps techniques to destroy him, such as replacing his medicine with poisonous substances.

Gibbs begins to suspect that they are being manipulated by Ryan, especially when Dr Cranston points out Ryan uses PsyOps techniques to manipulate almost everyone she meets. When she refuses to provide anything beyond Baxter, Gibbs starts believing that Ryan is hiding something: a suspicion confirmed when he discovers that Ryan has bugged his basement. To throw her off, Ryan discovers Gibbs waiting for her outside where her son goes to school, which is supposed to be classified information. Furious that her private life is compromised, Ryan complains to Director Vance but Gibbs reveals her bugging his home. Further evidence comes to light which puts Baxter as the prime suspect, seeking revenge for his discharge by manipulating Banks' life, but when Baxter is eventually tracked down, he reveals NCIS has been fed false information by PsyOps: he has been working as a CI for the DEA for over a year, and has been under 24/7 surveillance.

Ryan then approaches Gibbs at his home, and in return for him keeping her son's whereabouts a secret gives Gibbs the necessary clues to solve the case. The team finds out that Banks was murdered by his daughter, who wanted the money from his life insurance policy, and one of Banks' co-workers who she seduced into helping her. They proceed to arrest the pair, who try to pin the blame on the other.

Afterwards, Ryan calls Gibbs in the middle of the night, telling him that he has a special gift for making people feel safe, and asks him out for breakfast, to which he replies that he knows a diner that is open 24 hours.

== Production ==
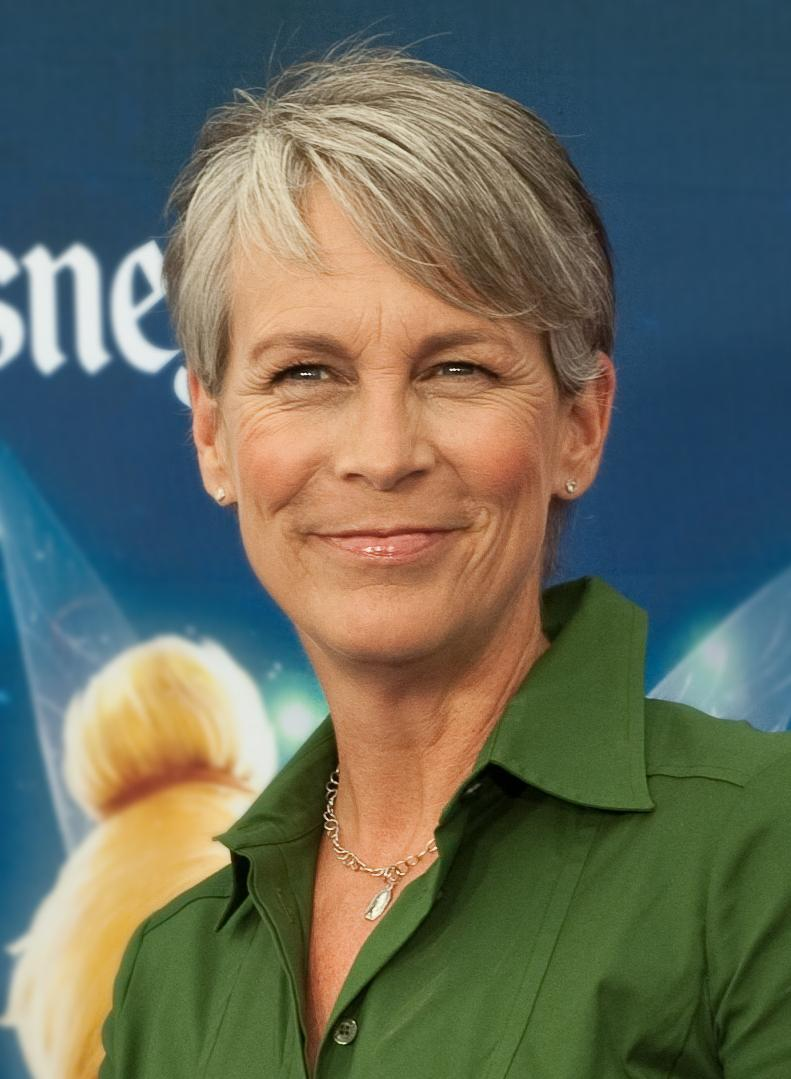
Jamie Lee Curtis guest starred in "Psych Out".

"Psych Out" is written by Gary Glasberg & Reed Steiner and directed by Dennis Smith. The episode was originally planned to air in November 2011, but was later moved to February 2012. It's the first episode of a two-part arc between Gibbs and Ryan, the next aired on March 20, 2012.

In the aftermath of "Life Before His Eyes", "Gibbs has perhaps shed some of the guilt he carried over his wife's death, which may open him up to new relationships", according to Executive producer Gary Glasberg. Jamie Lee Curtis portrays psychiatrist Samantha Ryan in the episode, and her character "knows how to get inside people's heads and she knows how to spar with Gibbs", Glasberg told TV Guide. "She's willing to challenge him on a professional level, which will then carry over into other things. You can't keep [characters] alone forever!".

Dr. Rachel Cranston is recurring in the episode, last seen in the Season premiere, "Nature of the Beast".

== Gibbs' rules ==
Gibbs introduced rule number 42, "Don't ever accept an apology from someone who just sucker punched you", referring to Ryan first bugging his home and then coming over to apologize.

== Reception ==
"Psych Out" was seen by 19.29 million live viewers following its broadcast on February 21, 2012, with a 12.1/19 share among all households, and 3.6/10 share among adults aged 18 to 49. A rating point represents one percent of the total number of television sets in American households, and a share means the percentage of television sets in use tuned to the program. In total viewers, "Psych Out" easily won NCIS and CBS the night, while the spin-off NCIS: Los Angeles drew second and was seen by 15.47 million viewers. Compared to last week's episode "Secrets", "Psych Out" was down a bit in both viewers and adults 18–49.

Steve Marsi from TV Fanatic gave the episode 4.5 (out of 5) and stated that "a major reason the episode worked so well was Jamie Lee Curtis' Dr. Samantha Ryan, a uniquely formidable "brain gamer" and an adversary who temporarily threw Gibbs off his game - not an easy feat. Despite portraying a character we were meant to intensely distrust and dislike from the get-go, Curtis turned in a strong, nuanced performance and commanded the screen alongside Mark Harmon throughout".
