= The Succubus (short story) =

Short story

"The Succubus" (French: "Le Succube") is an 1837 short story by Honoré de Balzac, from Les Contes drolatiques, about the 1271 trial of a succubus disguised as a woman.
