= The Succubus (sculpture) =

Sculpture by Auguste Rodin

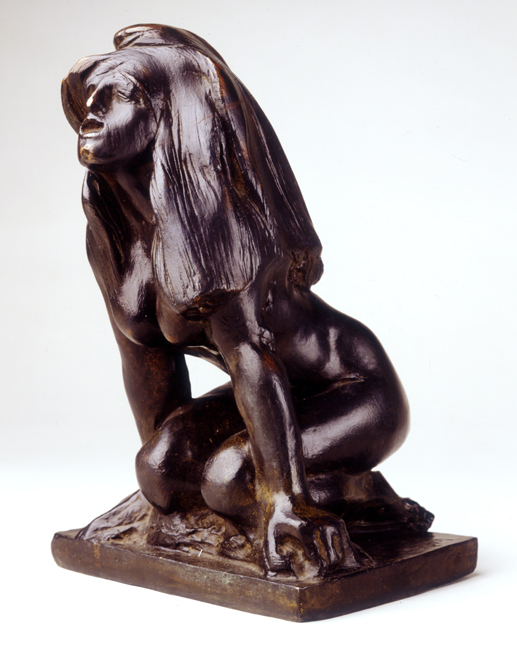
- Artist: Auguste Rodin
- Year: 1889
- Medium: Bronze
- Location: Museo Soumaya, Mexico City

The Succubus is a bronze sculpture with a green and dark brown patina. It was originally conceived in 1889 by the French artist Auguste Rodin as part of a set of works showing sirens and Nereids. It later formed part of his state-commissioned monument to Victor Hugo. It is now in the Museo Soumaya in Mexico City.

== Description ==
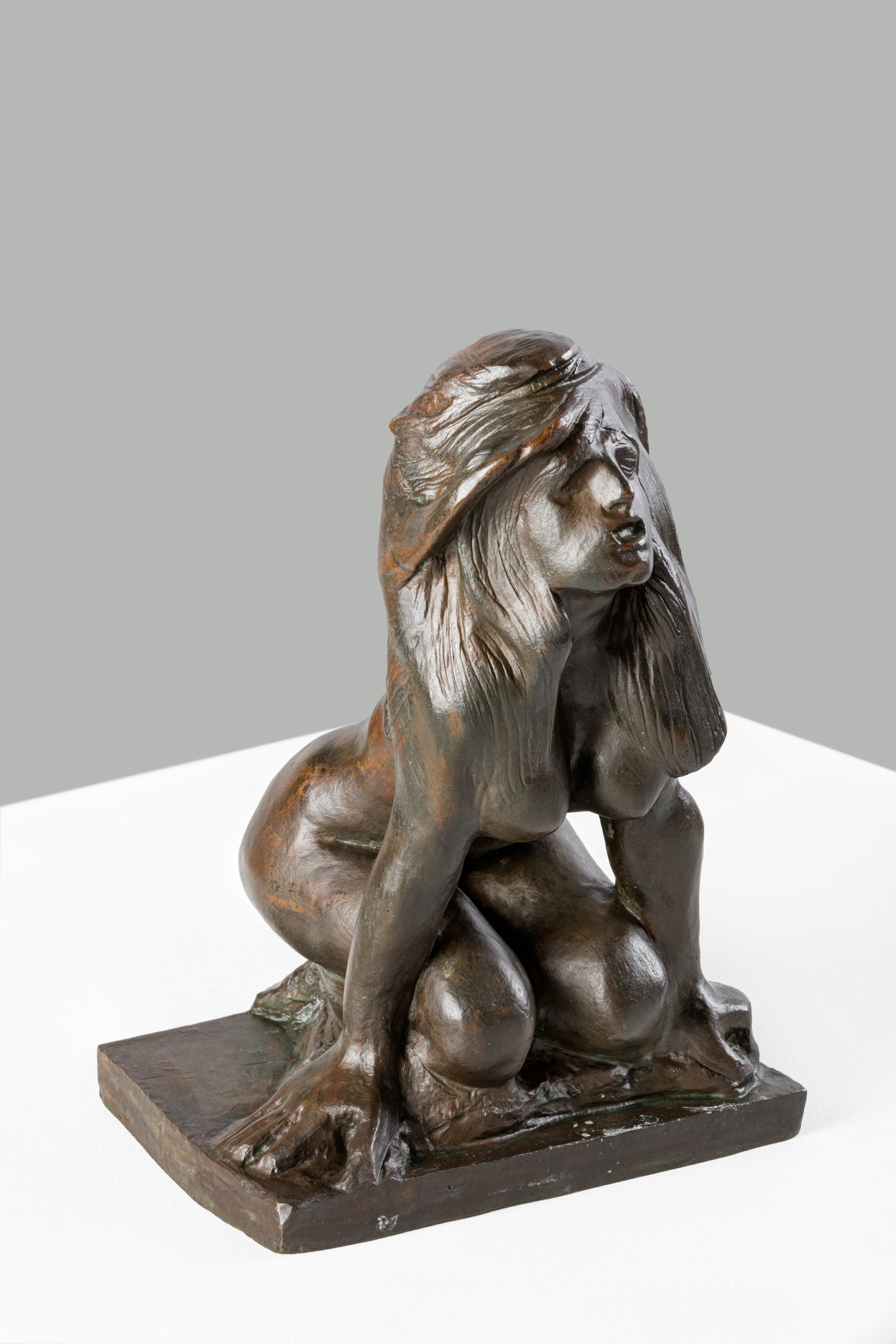
The Succubus

It shows a succubus, a demon taking on female form to deceive and seduce human men. The figure kneels in a feline posture, evoking medieval associations between cats and the forces of darkness. She is beautiful and her eyes are closed, but her mouth is open and screaming. French sculptor Camille Claudel is thought to be the model for the statue.

== See also ==
- List of sculptures by Auguste Rodin
