= List of Sleepy Hollow characters =

The following is a list of characters from the Fox supernatural drama television series Sleepy Hollow, which is loosely based on the 1820 Halloween short story "The Legend of Sleepy Hollow" by Washington Irving with added concepts from "Rip Van Winkle", also by Irving.

== Cast ==
Appearances
Character	Actor	Season			
Character	Actor	Season 1 (2013–14)	Season 2 (2014–15)	Season 3 (2015–16)	Season 4 (2017)
Main characters
Captain Ichabod Crane	Tom Mison	Main			
Lt. (later Agent) Grace Abigail "Abbie" Mills	Nicole Beharie (Note: In season 1 a young Abigail Mills is portrayed by recurring actress Jahnee Wallace.)	Main			
Captain Frank Irving	Orlando Jones	Main			
Katrina Crane	Katia Winter	Main			
Jennifer "Jenny" Mills	Lyndie Greenwood	Recurring	Main		
Henry Parrish / Jeremy Crane / The Horseman of War	John Noble	Recurring	Main		Recurring
Betsy Ross	Nikki Reed			Main	
Pandora	Shannyn Sossamon			Main	
Joe Corbin	Zach Appelman		Guest	Main	
Daniel Reynolds	Lance Gross			Main	
Sophie Foster	Jessica Camacho			Main	
Diana Thomas	Janina Gavankar				Main
Jake Wells	Jerry MacKinnon				Main
Alex Norwood	Rachel Melvin				Main
Molly Thomas	Oona Yaffe				Main
Malcolm Dreyfuss	Jeremy Davies				Main
Supporting characters
The Headless Horseman / Abraham van Brunt	Richard Cetrone	Recurring			
The Headless Horseman / Abraham van Brunt	Jeremy Owens	Recurring		Guest	
The Headless Horseman / Abraham van Brunt	Craig Branham	Guest	Recurring	Guest	
The Headless Horseman / Abraham van Brunt	Neil Jackson	Guest	Recurring		
The Headless Horseman / Abraham van Brunt	Unknown / Body Double				Recurring
Officer Andy Brooks	John Cho	Recurring	Guest		
Sheriff August Corbin	Clancy Brown	Recurring	Guest		
Reverend Alfred Knapp	Patrick Gorman	Guest			
Detective Luke Morales	Nicholas Gonzalez	Recurring			
Moloch	D. J. Mifflin	Recurring			
Moloch	Derek Mears	Guest	Recurring		
Detective Devon Jones	Michael Roark	Recurring			
Grace Dixon	Onira Tarés	Guest			
Cynthia Irving	Jill Marie Jones	Recurring	Guest		
Macey Irving	Amandla Stenberg	Recurring			
Benjamin Franklin	Jon Sparks	Guest			
Benjamin Franklin	Timothy Busfield		Recurring		
Sheriff Leena Reyes	Sakina Jaffrey		Recurring		
Nick Hawley	Matt Barr		Recurring		
Zoe Corinth	Maya Kazan			Recurring	
Ezra Mills	James McDaniel			Recurring	
Atticus Nevins	Bill Irwin			Recurring	
The Hidden One	Peter Mensah			Recurring	
Jobe	Kamar de los Reyes				Recurring
Benjamin Banneker	Edwin Hodge				Recurring
Lara	Seychelle Gabriel				Recurring

== Main characters ==
=== Captain Ichabod Crane ===
Captain Ichabod Crane, Esquire (Tom Mison), former professor of history at Oxford University prior to the American Revolution, comes to America with the British before switching sides to spy for the Colonists, under General George Washington. In 1781, he dies while simultaneously beheading the Horseman, and their blood mixes together. Later, the Horseman is resurrected, as is Crane. Despite his skepticism, he proves to be an invaluable resource after his resurrection, due to his detailed knowledge of supernatural lore. Although initially he has difficulty adapting to the 21st century, by the end of the second season, he states he has acclimatized (aside from occasional mishaps), berating Katrina and Henry for holding onto the past. As of the third season, he is applying for American citizenship to legalize his efforts to preserve the archive he and Abbie use to research their adversaries, although the application process is delayed in "Dark Mirror" due to Crane missing an important interview while trying to save Abbie. As of "The Sisters Mills", Crane is officially head of the Hudson Valley Historical Society, giving him an explanation for his expertise and a reason for his affiliation with the FBI. He revealed that the two Witnesses would be facing seven disasters in the episode I, Witness. The first disaster would be Moloch, and the second one would be Pandora. At the end of the series, the President makes him an official citizen of America.

The series ends with Crane still to face four Tribulations, with his soul sold to the devil. However, Crane is confident that he can get out of the contract; given that, if he returned the Philosopher's Stone he bargained his soul for, that would nullify the deal.

=== Lt. Grace Abigail "Abbie" Mills ===
Lieutenant Grace Abigail "Abbie" Mills (Nicole Beharie), lifelong resident of Sleepy Hollow. She was about to transfer to Quantico to train with the FBI, but after the death of her mentor she decides to stay and gradually comes to accept her role in the fight against the Horseman as the second Witness to the Apocalypse. Abbie is the driving force in the future of understanding the new Sleepy Hollow, as well as helping Crane adjust to his new era. She keeps much anger from her deceased mother's actions deep inside, as well as nurturing complex feelings over her father's abandonment. Between seasons two and three, she completed a course at Quantico and is now a member of the FBI stationed in Sleepy Hollow. In the season three finale, she sacrifices herself to restore Pandora's box to contain the power of the Hidden One, but her soul is subsequently released from the box and allowed to pass on after a final goodbye to Crane, assuring him that there are other Witnesses out there to assist him in his burden.

=== Jennifer "Jenny" Mills ===
Jennifer "Jenny" Mills (Lyndie Greenwood), Abbie's younger sister who was confined in a mental institution. As teenagers, they both witnessed the rise of the second Horseman while walking through the forest one day after school. However, Abbie denies seeing the creature, while Jenny insists they both saw it, and so Jenny is institutionalized, since it seems clear she is mentally ill. Unknown to Abbie, though, Sheriff Corbin was Jenny's mentor. While in and out of mental hospitals, Jenny trained in combat in foreign countries, helping Corbin hunt down occult artifacts. She breaks out of the institution, but after Abbie tells her sister she will never again deny what they saw, the sisters are reconciled. Jenny later takes part in helping to solve the mysteries surrounding the Horseman. Following Abigail's death, Jenny remains in contact with Crane, following him to Washington D.C., acknowledging that the two of them are the only real family either has left.

== Seasoned main characters ==
=== Season 1 ===
The following characters continue to be main characters in season 2.

==== Captain Frank Irving ====
Captain Frank Irving (Orlando Jones), the chief of Sleepy Hollow's Sheriff's department (who is affiliated with the New York State Police). Initially skeptical of Crane and Mills' assertions, he later discovers the truth when the trio confront, battle, and trap the Horseman. After confessing to murders his possessed daughter committed, he is arrested and sent to the psychiatric ward. Later in Season 2, Henry tricks Irving into selling his soul to him by signing a contract naming Henry as his lawyer. Irving is later killed by the armored form of the Horseman of War in "The Akeda", but is risen from the dead in "Paradise Lost", at which point he is taken back into custody. Later revealed to be under Henry's control, Irving is freed but allowed to remain alive once Henry is slain. Irving subsequently departs the country to protect his family from the forces of the Apocalypse.

==== Katrina Crane ====
Katrina Crane (Katia Winter), Ichabod's wife, who is secretly a witch. It is she who casts the spell of suspended animation on Crane, after his supposed "fatal" wounding by the Horseman. She is unaware that the Horseman's blood mingled with Crane's, and that her husband's resurrection also signals the return of the Horseman. Katrina appears to Crane only in dreams, telling him she is trapped in Purgatory, a place between worlds, and can only be freed with the defeat of the Horseman. Crane and Abbie are able to free her, but soon after Katrina is captured by the Horseman, revealed to be Abraham "Brom" van Brunt, a former suitor. She remains with him, communicating secret knowledge to Crane, but later escapes to Crane and Abbie. Ichabod and Katrina's marriage is strained by the secrets she keeps, which include compelling a one-time lover of Crane's to suicide. Katrina later causes tension when she tries to restore Abraham's humanity. She encounters the "Warlock", at which time Katrina gives into her dark side, aligning with Henry's plan to awaken the descendants of her coven of witches, despite the danger if these powers are activated in the modern world. When Henry is slain, she attempts to alter history by going back in time to kill Crane after his fight with the Horseman, the spell allowing her to "possess" her prior-self. But fortunately, Abbie is able to travel back in time using Katrina's spell, allowing her to keep Crane safe long enough for her to negate the time travel spell and return them to their present, with Crane forced to stab Katrina to save Abbie's life.

=== Season 2 ===
==== Henry Parrish ====
Henry Parrish / Jeremy Crane / The Horseman of War (John Noble), he is initially seen as a Sin Eater who helped Crane break the curse connecting him with the Headless Horseman. Later, Parrish is revealed to be Katrina and Crane's son, Jeremy Crane, and the Second of the Four Horsemen of the Apocalypse, War. Henry is bitter that his parents' actions trapped him in a coffin for two centuries in a state of living death until he is released by Moloch. He believed Moloch to be his true father, but later destroys Moloch, who sees Henry as expendable. After killing Moloch, Henry spends time contemplating his life; he comes to see he protected Katrina out of love, wanting to create a "family" by awakening latent powers in the witches' descendants. He is slain by Abbie. His spirit appears before Katrina, welcoming her to the afterlife.

In the fourth season, a variation of Henry manifests from a spider-demon that trapped Crane in a hallucination where he was 'on trial' for his role in the death of Abigail Mills. Later in the series, Henry is able to manifest from the remnants of the demon when Crane is transformed into a new Horseman of War, but he specifically states that he is a manifestation of what parts of Henry Crane chooses to remember, rather than the actual Henry Parrish reborn.

=== Season 3 ===
==== Elizabeth "Betsy" Ross ====
Betsy Ross (Nikki Reed), Crane's old flame. Although history merely remembers her as the seamstress who designed the American flag, she was actually a secret agent for General Washington who fought off several supernatural threats; she used the fact she was a woman to her advantage numerous times. She was later found still alive in a tomb in a hidden dimension on the River Styx, having been trapped during a mission to cross the Delaware, but the storyline concluded with her returning to her time, her "later" distance to Crane attributed in hindsight to her knowledge of his future ties to Abbie.

==== Pandora ====
Pandora (Shannyn Sossamon), a mysterious new presence in Sleepy Hollow. She unleashes six different threats against the two of them, with the goal of nurturing the emotions that are inspired by their new adversaries in Crane and/or Abbie, each particular crisis causing a new bud to bloom on a tree that will serve as a means for Pandora to open a portal to Hell. Once the portal was completed, Pandora entered the tree and returned with a figure that she refers to as her 'husband', an ancient Sumerian god known only as 'the Hidden One', using her box to restore his power so that he can purge humanity. Fortunately, the Witnesses manage to destroy her box before the Hidden One can fully 'recharge', forcing her to donate some of her power to sustain him. As she sees the Hidden One become consumed by his vendetta against humanity, Pandora turns against him to side with the Witnesses, recognising that they have a genuine bond of love and respect, as opposed to the Hidden One's disdain for her, considering her just another human despite their long history.

Yet, Pandora is just using the Witnesses for the purpose of remaking her box in order to gather the Hidden One's power for her own use. Her box absorbs the power force from the Hidden One and Abbie's life; she then claims herself to be a goddess. Pandora asks Crane and his team to obey her, but the offer is rejected. She is finally killed by the Headless Horseman after the Horseman is summoned by Crane.

==== Joseph "Joe" Corbin ====
Joseph "Joe" Corbin (Zach Appelman), the son of Abbie's and Jenny's mentor and former Sheriff August Corbin. Henry cursed him to be a wendigo, but he was saved from this fate, thanks to Crane and Nicks' help using a Native American artifact. As of the third season, he has joined Jenny in continuing his father's work with tracking down any supernatural artifacts, effectively filling Nick's role. As then, the two have rekindled a romance.

The wendigo is completely removed when Pandora uses her box to draw out the dark power from him in order to break the barrier that imprisons the Hidden One and Crane. However, the wendigo in him reawakens when the Hidden One uses Jenny's fear to transform him back into his demonic form once again, which ultimately forced her to end his life by shooting him in front of her. This frees him from the demon for good, but at the cost of his own life.

==== Daniel Reynolds ====
Daniel Reynolds (Lance Gross), Abbie and Sophie's new boss and ex-lover. While he is shown to become frustrated with Abbie's secrets, it is revealed in the mid-season finale that he was reporting on her to someone else, referring to her as an 'asset' that they were 'nurturing'. It would later be implied to be the Order founded by Washington himself to look after the Witnesses.

==== Sophie Foster ====
Sophie Foster (Jessica Camacho), a rogue player in the world of high-end artifacts trading who attempts to retrieve the Shard of Anubis from Jenny and Joe. She is eventually revealed to be an FBI agent in deep cover who appears ignorant of the true stakes of the investigation, although when she witnesses Crane accidentally summon a demon, she admits that she has been interested in the supernatural since her archaeologist parents vanished on a dig when she was a child.

=== Season 4 ===
==== Diana Thomas ====
Diana Thomas (Janina Gavankar), a Homeland Security Agent who is thrust into Ichabod Crane's world after her partner was killed by a demon. She is also the mother of 10-year old Molly Thomas, whom Crane discovers is the next Biblical Witness. As Molly is too young, Diana serves as Abby's replacement on the mission. Although hesitant at first to expose Molly to the supernatural, she accepts that it is an unavoidable aspect of her daughter being the next Witness.

==== Jacob "Jake" Wells ====
Jerry MacKinnon as Jacob "Jake" Wells, a research analyst for Agency 355; he also works in The Vault. He assists Crane and Diana on cases when required and works alongside Alex Norwood.

==== Alexandra "Alex" Norwood ====
Rachel Melvin as Alexandra "Alex" Norwood, a talented engineer who works for Agency 355 and is partnered with Jake Wells. She spends her spare time devising contraptions in The Vault. She assists Crane and Diana on cases when required.

==== Molly Thomas ====
Oona Yaffe as Molly Thomas, the now 11-year-old daughter of Diana Thomas, and the former Biblical Witness. Molly was silent for several weeks after the death of Abbie Mills, but broke her silence when she met Ichabod. Molly loses her Witness responsibilities when her future self Lara appeared, Lara travelling back from a timeline where Dreyfuss succeeded in his plans to conquer America. In the future timeline, Lara was raised to believe that Diana was killed in a misguided rebellion against Dreyfuss and Crane was executed as a traitor, fighting alongside Dreyfuss's forces to bring order to the world, but after witnessing the truth about War, Lara made contact with Crane and was given a spell to travel back in time to undo her history.

==== Malcolm Dreyfuss ====
Jeremy Davies as Malcolm Dreyfuss, an eccentric billionaire and owner of Dreyfuss Enterprises. It is revealed over the course of the season that he achieved his fame by making a deal with the devil, with his plans focusing on finding a loophole that will prevent his soul from going to Hell. After using his resources to gather and reform the Philosopher's Stone to achieve immortality, Malcolm then collected totems to raise the Four Horsemen of the Apocalypse with the goal of overthrowing the government and ushering in his new world order. Although his plans allow him to recreate the Horsemen of the Apocalypse, recruiting the Headless Horsemen as Death and collecting totems that will allow his chosen acolytes to act as Famine and Pestilence, the team receive unexpected aid when Lara - a version of Molly from the timeline where Dreyfuss won - travels back in time to help the team disrupt his plan, temporarily transforming Crane into War so that Crane can destroy some of Dreyfuss's minions. When Henry Parish is brought back to serve as the new War, Crane is able to persuade his son to stand down, subsequently making his own deal with the devil in order to acquire a means of disrupting Dreyfuss's immortality. With Dreyfuss mortally wounded, he is taken to Hell by Jobe, who proclaims that Dreyfuss's contract has expired.

== Recurring characters ==
=== The Headless Horseman / Abraham van Brunt ===
The Headless Horseman / Abraham van Brunt (Richard Cetrone, Jeremy Owens, Craig Branham and Neil Jackson), a beheaded undead man later resurrected in the 21st century Sleepy Hollow with Crane, where he was revealed to be the First of the Four Horsemen of the Apocalypse: Death. He was Crane's best friend until he found out that Katrina broke her betrothal with him because she was in love with Crane, after which he became the Horseman so he could get revenge. He later holds her captive, but she escapes back to Crane. He believes that he was meant to be the hero of his story, but that Crane was the one who turned him into a villain. After Abbie and Crane save him from being destroyed by a fallen angel, he reluctantly agrees to leave them alone and abstain from killing in exchange for Katrina being allowed to attempt to return him to his mortal form. Pandora later seals him in her box to harness his power for her husband, the Hidden One, but Crane later released him from the box to defeat the near-goddess-like Pandora, recognising that the Horseman is not an Apocalypse-level threat now that Moloch is dead. He killed Pandora in the end, with the help of Crane. He returns when Crane relocates to Washington, attempting to claim the head of the President of the United States before he is trapped in a prison dimension. Rescued by new series antagonist Dreyfuss - who reveals that Crane was only able to kill the Horseman in their first battle because he was fighting on top of the Philosopher's Stone - the Horseman once again acts as Death to Dreyfuss's new Horsemen, but after Henry Parrish stands down as Dreyfuss's War, the other three vanish mid-battle when Dreyfuss is taken back to Hell.

=== Moloch ===
Moloch (D. J. Mifflin and Derek Mears), the main antagonist of the first two seasons of the series. He is a god-like demon with the goal of bringing forward the Apocalypse and the raising of the Headless Horseman. He was the one who imprisoned Katrina in Purgatory, after Katrina's coven handed her over (as punishment for saving Crane). He is killed by Henry after Henry learns that Moloch, who he perceived as a father, only saw him as an expendable tool, allowing all the spirits and monsters from Purgatory to escape. With Moloch dead, his apocalypse cannot come to be.

Crane later remarks that Doctor Temperance "Bones" Brennan - the protagonist of Bones - is so grounded in science that she would pass Moloch off as a tall man with a skin condition.

=== Officer Andy Brooks ===
Officer Andrew "Andy" Brooks (John Cho), Mills' co-worker and former best friend. He was revealed to be affiliated with the coven that resurrected the Horseman, and, despite having his neck broken in the pilot for his failure, has since returned as an undead being to aid other spirits in their efforts to be reborn. While he is undead, he continues to help Abby solve the mysteries because he regrets all the horrible things he has done. Moloch later turns him into a more powerful creature, but Andy willingly allows himself to die to be free of his agony. His fate following Moloch's demise remains unknown; he was last shown trapped in Purgatory, helping Abbie find a way of escape to show that he was still in control of himself. He appears to harbor unresolved feelings for Abbie as he is still trying to protect her, even in death, and he once stated to Abbie that she reminds him that he still is human.

=== Sheriff August Corbin ===
Sheriff August Corbin (Clancy Brown), Mills' mentor and father figure. He was decapitated by the Horseman during the Horseman's return. He was apparently aware of the secrets of Sleepy Hollow and collected extensive records. It was eventually revealed that he was also Jenny's mentor, although the sisters never knew that he knew both of them. He continues to appear before Mills even after death as a ghost to offer support and advice. In the Bones crossover episode "The Resurrection in the Remains", Bones protagonist Seeley Booth mentioned that he met Corbin, who compared him favourably to Abbie, Corbin's only 'criticism' being that Abbie needed to learn that she did not have to save the world all in one day.

=== Grace Dixon ===
Grace Dixon (Onira Tares), Abbie and Jenny's ancestor who helped Katrina Crane give birth to her son. Katrina left him in her care; however, his cries started a house fire that ultimately killed her. During her lifetime, she cataloged all magic known to her world in a journal that was passed down to her descendants. After Katrina inadvertently pulls Abbie back in time, Grace helps her reverse the effects of the spell, and tells Abbie that the blank pages in the back of the journal are for her to document her work as a Witness. She also tells Abbie that there are others out there like herself and Reverend Knapp, and that she is surprised that the Witnesses have not encountered any of them.

=== Nick Hawley ===
Nicholas "Nick" Hawley (Matt Barr), an arms and artifacts dealer who was in a relationship with Jenny. Despite not believing in the powers associated with the artifacts, he aids Abbie and Crane in their mission. He eventually learns the truth about Sleepy Hollow, and appears more willing to cooperate without compensation; he keeps a maelstrom crystal handy to give creatures that attack him "a nasty magical jolt". For a time he appears to harbor feelings for Abbie, though he ultimately attempts to rekindle a relationship with Jenny (he is also known to be a womanizer in general). Because of his questionable loyalties and interest in the Mills sisters, he constantly argues with Crane, who is deeply annoyed by his presence and considers him a "privateer". He leaves town after his godmother Carmilla Pines (Jaime Murray), reappears as a Vetala and escapes before they can defeat her or restore her humanity. He promised Jenny that he would come back as soon as he was sure he could trust himself not to get the others killed.

=== Detective Luke Morales ===
Detective Luke Morales (Nicholas Gonzalez), Mills' co-worker and ex-boyfriend, who is suspicious of Crane. After attempted to rekindle his relationship with Abbie, he is approached by Andy Brooks, who tells him he will need to choose a side in the coming conflict. He was almost killed by Macey during her possession, and it remains unclear if he is still alive or not.

=== Cynthia Irving ===
Cynthia Irving (Jill Marie Jones), Frank Irving's ex-wife. Following her daughter's possession, she is informed of the events occurring in Sleepy Hollow. She is aware of her ex-husband's death and resurrection, acting as his lawyer to clear him of the previous charges despite not being a defense attorney. However, she is unconvinced that her ex-husband returned without a scratch.

Irving, while controlled by Henry, later reveals that Cynthia and thus their daughter are descended from the Sisters of the Radiant Heart, Katrina's coven.

=== Macey Irving ===
Macey Irving (Amandla Stenberg), Frank's and Cynthia's daughter who is in a wheelchair after being hit by a car. She was briefly possessed by a demon and killed one person. She is later informed by the Witnesses about the paranormal occurrences taking place in the town. The fact she will never have children is something that her father is most upset about; it nearly drove him to nearly kill the man who ran her over to reclaim his soul from War.

=== Leena Reyes ===
Leena Reyes (Sakina Jaffrey) (season 2), Irving's replacement at the Police Department. She was the one who had Abbie's and Jenny's mother sent to the psychiatric ward and placed the girls in foster care. She is unaware of the events occurring in Sleepy Hollow and distrusts Abbie and Crane. The pair later manage to convince her that a large Satanic cult has taken up residence in Sleepy Hollow (descendants of Hessians, loyal to Moloch and the Horsemen), explaining the town's odd occurrences, and that Crane is working with them as a consulting expert on occult forces.

=== Benjamin Franklin ===
Benjamin Franklin (Jon Sparks and Timothy Busfield) Crane's former mentor, who was a major player in the war against evil. Though he was incredibly brilliant, Crane found him arrogant and eccentric, and only agreed to assist him because George Washington assigned him to. When Abbie became trapped in the past, she initially went to Franklin for help, and he is delighted to learn the level of recognition he and his works continue to receive in the present day. He is briefly killed by the Horseman when Katrina sends the Horseman after Crane, but Abbie's success in undoing Katrina's attempt at time travel negates these events, erasing Franklin's premature demise and his meeting with Abbie.

Crane even once stated that a bobble head of Franklin was quite accurate in describing his ego.

=== Reverend Alfred Knapp ===
Reverend Alfred Knapp (Patrick Gorman), a warlock from the same coven as Katrina who helped her cast a resurrection spell on Crane. He was later present at the resurrection of George Washington, and remained in Sleepy Hollow to guard the location of the Headless Horseman's head. After the Horseman's resurrection, he confronts Knapp and then decapitates him.

=== Detective Devon Jones ===
Detective Devon Jones (Michael Roark), Morales' partner. Alongside Luke, he was assigned to protect Macey Irving and is later killed by his demon-possessed partner.

=== Zoe Corinth ===
Zoe Corinth (Maya Kazan), a love interest for Ichabod who helps him apply for citizenship. Due to Crane later becoming obsessed with rescuing Abbie from the Catacombs for a month, she believed he was "ghosting" her to break up. Crane managed to salvage their relationship as a friendship.

=== Ezra Mills ===
Ezra Mills (James McDaniel), Abbie and Jenny's father. He has been revealed to have some connection to a supernatural government division set up by George Washington, officially to aid Crane in his role as a Witness, but notes that the organisation has become divided in its original purpose.

=== Jobe ===
Kamar de los Reyes as Jobe, a demon that works with Malcolm Dreyfuss in accordance with the contract they have formed. In exchange for Malcolm's soul, Jobe offered him success in life. Jobe assisted Malcolm with his quest for immortality, and helped him raise the Four Horsemen with the use of totems. Despite this, Jobe is not pleased to be helping someone escape paying on a contract; he directed the Witnesses to Hell, so Satan could help. When Crane rendered Malcolm mortal once again with the Philosopher's Stone, Jobe sent Malcolm to Hell and fulfilled his contract.

== See also ==
- List of Sleepy Hollow episodes
