= Akingbola =

Akingbola is a Nigerian surname that may refer to the following notable people:

- Fola Evans-Akingbola, British actress
- Jimmy Akingbola (born 1978), Nigerian-British television, theatre and film actor
- Sola Akingbola, percussionist of the English funk and acid jazz band Jamiroquai
