= Tiffany Lonsdale =

British actress

- Born: Leila Tiffany Lonsdale-Hands; 1 June 1981 (age 45); London, England
- Other name: Tiffany Lonsdale-Hands
- Occupation: Actress
- Years active: 2010–present

Leila Tiffany Lonsdale-Hands (born 1 June 1981) is a British actress. She is best known for her roles in the Freeform series Siren (2020) and the FX crime dram Snowfall (2022–2023).

== Early life ==
Lonsdale was born in central London to a British father and an Iranian mother. She grew up in both England and Dallas, Texas. Lonsdale was accepted to the Royal Military Academy Sandhurst, but instead pursued acting.

== Career ==
Her first recurring role came playing Emily Vanderhaus in the CBC science fiction mini series Ascension. Her first big role came playing Molly Hathaway in the drama series This is a Love Story. She had a main role as in the fantasy drama series Siren portraying Tia. Her biggest role so far has been playing Parissa in the crime drama series Snowfall.

== Personal life ==
Outside of acting. she enjoys reading, cooking, and training for the annual Los Angeles Marathon. She lives in Los Angeles with her three adopted pets: two cats and a dog.

== Filmography ==
=== Film ===
Year	Title	Role	Notes
2010	Adventures of Bailey: The Lost Puppy	Clementine	
2010	Block	Emma	Short
2011	Time Line Inc.	Molly Corbitt	Short
2011	Justice for Natalee Holloway	Stephany Flores	
2011	I Become Gilgamesh	Susan Elliott	
2011	The Golden Veil	Maria	
2012	Blissful Lies	Kinsley Abbott	
2013	G.I. Joe: Retaliation	British Expert	
2013	Phobia	Marcia	
2013	Snake & Mongoose	Betty	
2016	Hail, Caesar!	Ursulina	
2025	Zootopia 2	Gala Announcer (voice)	

=== Television ===
Year	Title	Role	Notes
2014	Ascension	Emily Vanderhaus	3 episodes
2018	This Is a Love Story	Molly Hathaway	8 episodes
2018	S.W.A.T.	Kamile	Episode; Gasoline Drum
2019	You	Mystery Woman	Episode; Love Actually
2020	Siren	Tia	10 episodes
2022–2023	Snowfall	Parissa	13 episodes
