= Striking Vipers =

- Black Mirror episode
- Promotional poster
- Episode no.: Series 5 Episode 1
- Directed by: Owen Harris
- Written by: Charlie Brooker
- Cinematography by: Gustav Danielsson
- Editing by: Nicolas Chaudeurge
- Original air date: 5 June 2019
- Running time: 61 minutes

Guest appearances
- Anthony Mackie as Danny Parker; Yahya Abdul-Mateen II as Karl Houghton; Nicole Beharie as Theo Parker; Pom Klementieff as Roxette; Ludi Lin as Lance; August Muschett as Tyler; Fola Evans-Akingbola as Mariella

Episode chronology
← Previous
- Bandersnatch (film)
- "Black Museum"
Next →
"Smithereens"

"Striking Vipers" is the first episode of the fifth series of the anthology series Black Mirror. It was written by series creator Charlie Brooker and directed by Owen Harris. The episode was released on Netflix, along with the rest of series five, on 5 June 2019.

The episode follows two old friends, Danny Parker (Anthony Mackie) and Karl Houghton (Yahya Abdul-Mateen II), reconnecting over a virtual reality fighting game. They begin having virtual sex in the game, which affects Danny's marriage with Theo (Nicole Beharie). The episode was filmed in Brazil. Its storyline arose from an idea about a workplace affair in virtual reality where neither co-worker knew the other's identity.

Critics identified fluidity of sexuality and gender, infidelity, love and friendship as major themes; the episode raises questions about whether Danny and Karl are gay and whether their relationship is infidelity. Reviewers were divided over whether it addressed these themes in an interesting way, and some found it inferior to series three's "San Junipero", which shows a lesbian relationship in virtual reality. The acting and directing was mostly praised, though some critics found the characterisation lacking.

== Plot ==
27-year-old Danny Parker (Anthony Mackie) and his girlfriend Theo (Nicole Beharie) go to a bar and pretend to be strangers. After they return home and have sex, Danny loudly plays the fictional fighting game Striking Vipers with his friend Karl Houghton (Yahya Abdul-Mateen II) as their preferred characters Lance and Roxette, respectively. This wakes Theo up.

Eleven years later, Danny hosts a barbecue at his house with Theo, with whom he is married and has a five-year-old child named Tyler (August Muschett). He has fallen out of contact with Karl, who is currently seeing a younger woman named Mariella (Fola Evans-Akingbola). At the party, Karl gives Danny a birthday present: Striking Vipers X, the series' newest installment, and the virtual reality kit needed to play it. That night, the pair play the game in their respective homes, falling motionless in real life as they fully experience all sensations of Lance (Ludi Lin) and Roxette (Pom Klementieff). After a bout of fighting, which induces real pain, they fall onto each other. Karl (as Roxette) kisses Danny (as Lance), but Danny pulls away after a few seconds and they exit the game.

Over the next few weeks, Danny and Karl regularly have sex in the game in the characters' bodies, and Theo notices that Danny is becoming withdrawn and no longer has sex with her, even though they have been trying to have a baby. Theo confronts him on their wedding anniversary and asks if he is having an affair. Danny says he is not and tells Karl they need to stop playing the game.

At Danny's next birthday, Theo invites Karl to dinner as a surprise. Karl reveals to Danny that he has been unable to recreate the emotions or experiences with computer-controlled characters or other players. That night, the pair enter the game and have passionate sex. Afterwards, Karl says "I love you". Danny arranges for them to meet in real life and kiss in their actual bodies, but both of them agree that there is no feeling there. Karl argues they should continue seeing each other in the game but Danny disagrees, and an ensuing fight is broken up by the police. Theo picks up Danny from the police station and is enraged at his silence about what caused the fight. Danny finally admits the truth.

On July 14, as the three have agreed on an annual tradition, Danny plays Striking Vipers X with Karl while Theo goes to the bar without her wedding ring to meet a stranger.

== Production ==
A fifth series of Black Mirror was commissioned by Netflix in March 2018, three months after the release of series four. Initially part of series five's production, the interactive work Black Mirror: Bandersnatch increased in scope to the point where it was separated from the series and released as a standalone film; it premiered on 28 December 2018. Although previous series of the programme produced under Netflix contained six episodes, series five comprises three episodes, as the series creator Charlie Brooker viewed this as preferable to making viewers wait longer for the next series. The three episodes—"Striking Vipers", "Smithereens" and "Rachel, Jack and Ashley Too"—were released on Netflix simultaneously on 5 June 2019. As Black Mirror is an anthology series, each instalment can be watched in any order. "Striking Vipers" was filmed before Bandersnatch.

=== Conception and writing ===
The episode was written by Brooker, alongside the executive producer Annabel Jones. The initial concept was for an office cohort to spend time in a virtual reality simulation as part of a team-building exercise, where they would prepare to perform the musical Grease. As part of the exercise, each employee's identity within the simulation would be unknown. The idea was conceived for two of the employees to have an affair within the simulation. This story changed over time, and was informed by another source of inspiration: Brooker was reflecting on his days of playing the fighting game Tekken with flatmates in the 1990s, and thought there was something interesting in the "homoerotic" and "weirdly primal" nature of the situation. He thought that neighbours could confuse their gaming sessions for a sex dungeon based on the noises they made. During the writing of "Striking Vipers", a variety of fighting games were used for reference, including Dead or Alive, a series where the characters have sexually provocative appearances.

Pornography was a theme discussed by the writers. Jones said the episode relates to the question of "when porn stops being a healthy distraction and actually becomes an affair". The name "Striking Vipers", which alludes to snakes and perhaps sexual imagery, was chosen by Brooker to sound like a plausible game title. During the writing process, he nicknamed it "Man Junipero", in reference to the series three episode "San Junipero". Brooker was conflicted as to whether the relationship between Danny and Karl is accurately described as a gay relationship, saying that it is also about male friendship and the barriers to communication between men. Jones noted that Danny's character regains a younger physique by entering the game, saying that there was a broader theme about aging and "finding your identity when you don't have those staples that you've grown up with".

In regards to the real-life kiss Danny and Karl share, Brooker thought the characters were telling the truth about experiencing a lack of excitement, but that it was different within the virtual reality game. Jones said that Danny feels relieved by the information he gets from the kiss, as he may be able to retain a stability in his marriage, but Karl feels worried over what implications it has for their virtual reality relationship. The final arrangement Theo, Danny and Karl have occurs once per year. Brooker and Jones saw this ending as both pragmatic and romantic. Jones said that Theo needs "to feel excited and loved", Danny needs "escapism and wish-fulfilment" and that Karl is "quite isolated", though the arrangement is "enough to sustain him". Brooker similarly commented that Karl's predicament is "the most bleak", while Danny and Theo's marriage "has actually been strengthened" by the arrangement—specifically, by their newfound communication about "their fantasies and needs". He saw the ending as ambiguous, rather than unreservedly happy.

=== Casting and filming ===
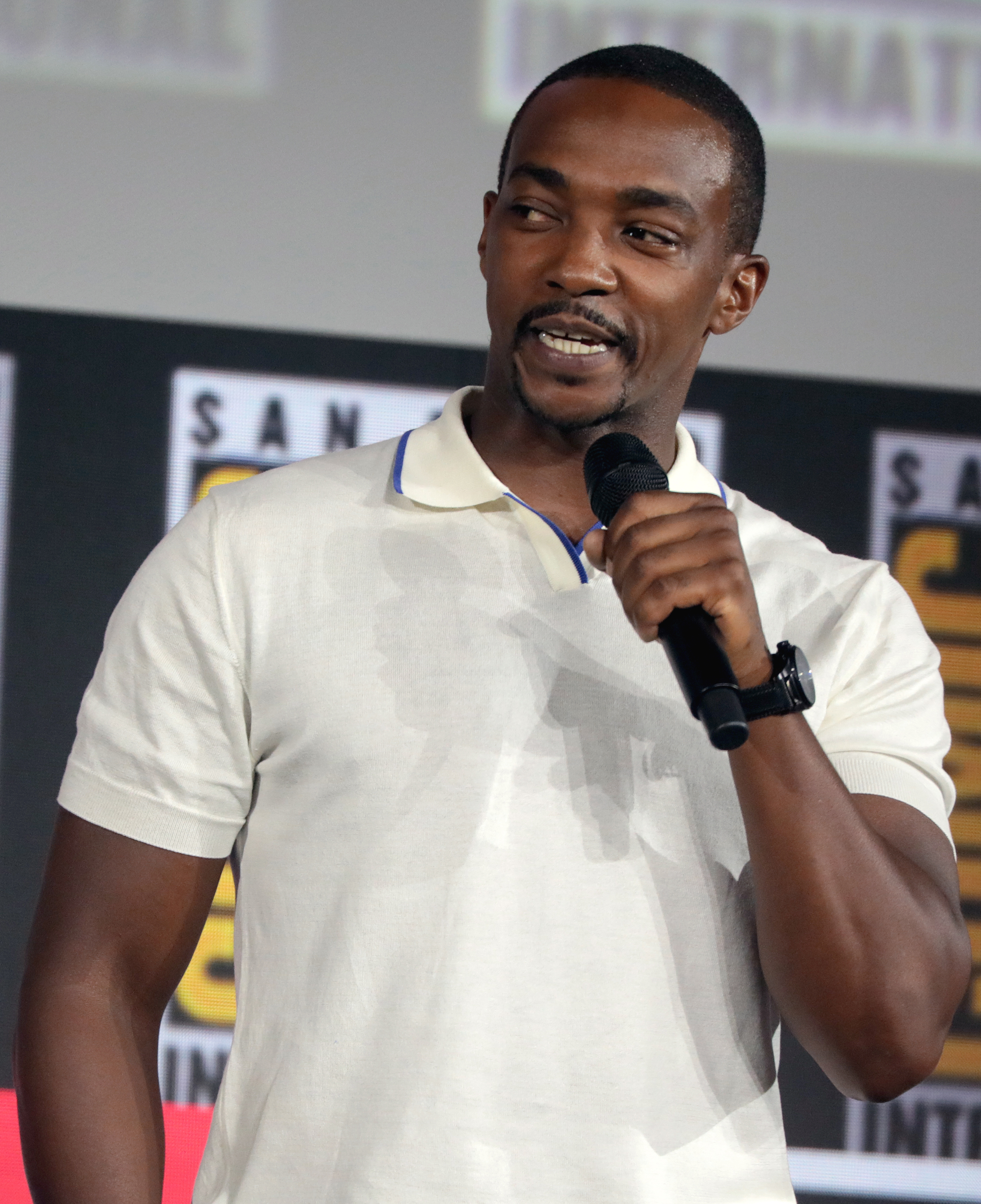
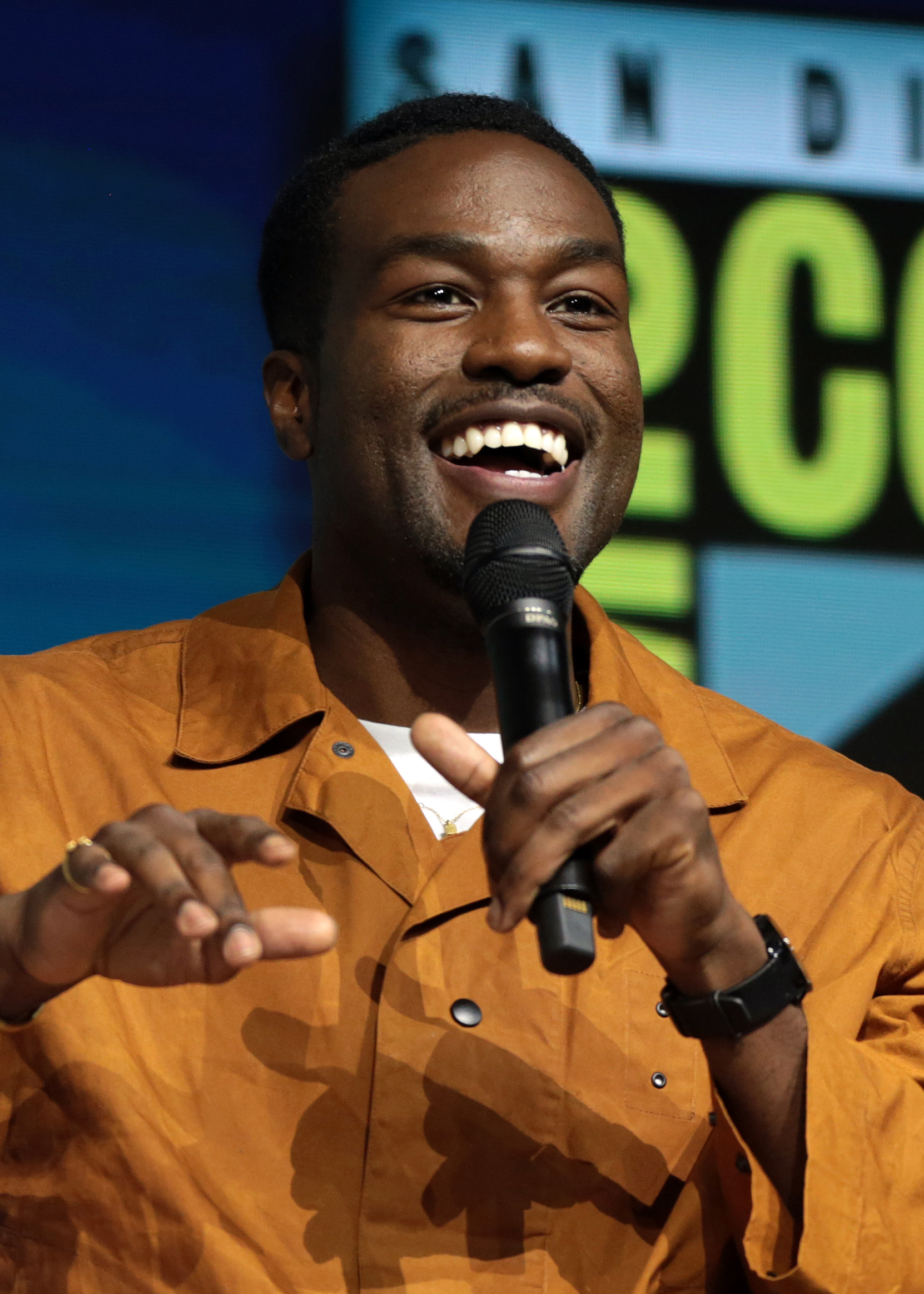
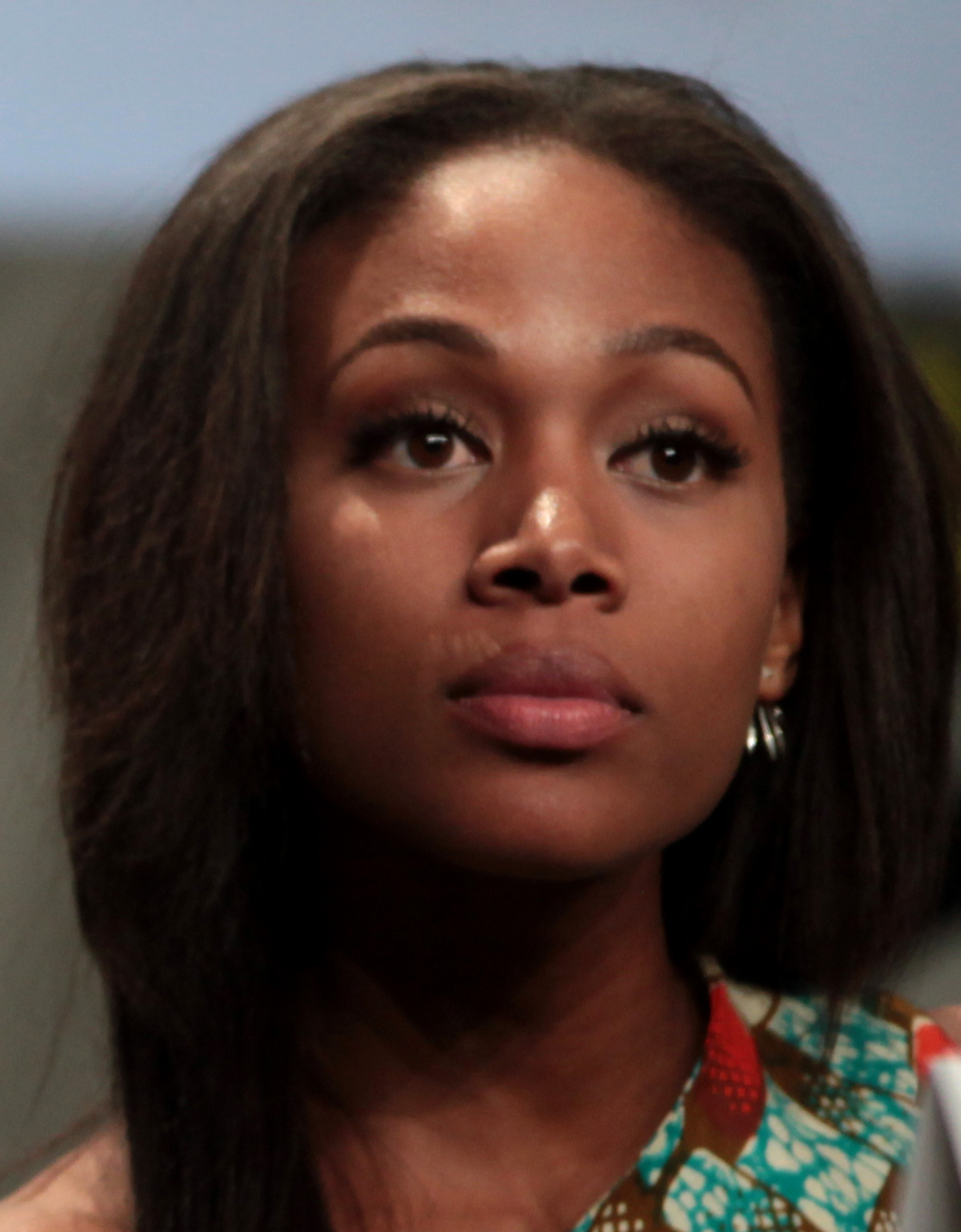
Anthony Mackie plays Danny (left); Yahya Abdul-Mateen II plays Karl (middle); and Nicole Beharie plays Theo (right).

"Striking Vipers" was the third Black Mirror episode to be directed by Owen Harris, after series two's "Be Right Back", and series three's "San Junipero". The episode has an all-black main cast, with Anthony Mackie as Danny, Yahya Abdul-Mateen II as Karl and Nicole Beharie as Theo. Beharie was a big fan of the show prior to her appearance. Within Striking Vipers X, Danny plays as Lance—portrayed by Ludi Lin—and Karl plays as Roxette—acted by Pom Klementieff. By coincidence, four of the actors played major roles in superhero films—Mackie was Falcon, Klementieff was Mantis, Abdul-Mateen was Black Manta, and Lin was the Black Ranger in Power Rangers. Though the script originally called for a suburban England setting, it is set in America. It was filmed in São Paulo, Brazil, from 18 March to 18 April 2018. The production company registered 19 locations for filming and 150 production staff. For example, the final scene of the episode shows a Striking Vipers X scene on top of a skyscraper, shot near the Edifício Copan, with a former Hilton Hotel made to look disused with computer-generated imagery.

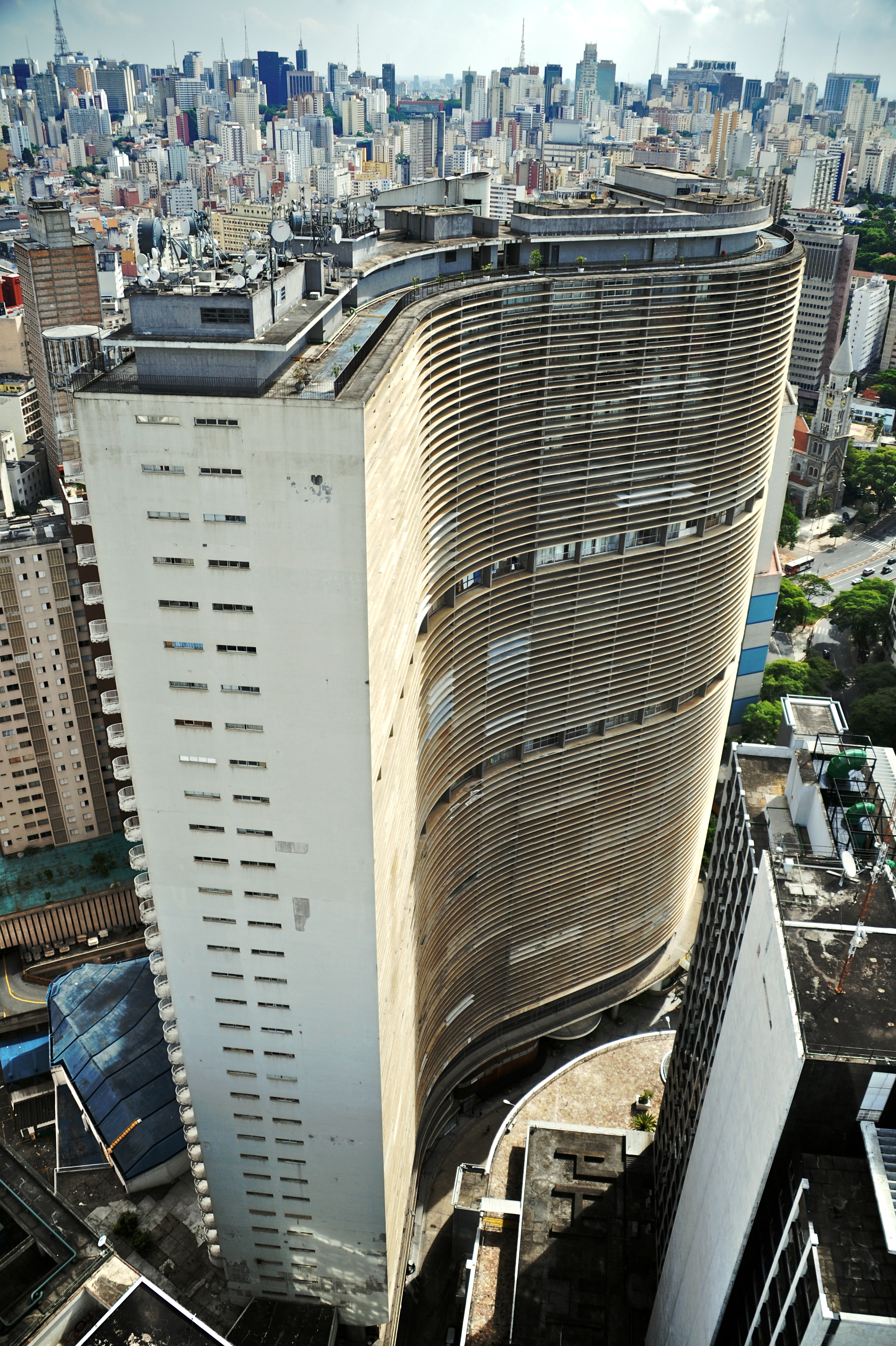
The final shot, in which Lance and Roxette meet on top of a skyscraper, was filmed near the Edifício Copan, one of about 20 São Paulo, Brazil, locations used in the episode.

Harris found it interesting that the bromance had not been subverted often in fiction, and enjoyed the question of whether society's views on monogamy and marriage might change, like how attitudes to dating changed with the prevalence of dating apps. Harris said that the episode had a dark humour, and one of the lines which helped him understand it was Karl's "I fucked a polar bear and I still couldn't get you out of my mind", which became oft-repeated by fans. Mackie said that the filming of the scene with that line "took probably an hour longer than it was supposed to" because of how amusing the actors found it. When asked about fans, Mackie said that those who approached him would either be interested in a long conversation about the themes of the episode, or make homophobic and uninformed comments about it.

Mackie said that love was the important idea in the episode, and that the crew spoke about "what it means for people to truly care about each other". The script was written without the race of the male characters in mind. Commenting that masculinity in the black community was a contemporary discussion point, Mackie recalled that Harris talked with him very early on about the relevance of race to the characters. In response to whether Karl was gay, Harris said that sexuality is a spectrum "far broader and more complex" than "black and white". Abdul-Mateen thought that Karl felt "understood and ... seen by Danny" and that it was this that he found attractive in the relationship. He said that Karl feels loneliness underneath his external personality. Abdul-Mateen made it ambiguous whether Karl was suppressing his sexuality or was simply finding himself in a new situation, and said that they "didn't want to define exactly" what underpinned Danny and Karl's relationship.

Jones said of Danny and Karl's real-life kiss that both actors aimed to be clear that the excitement from Striking Vipers X was "not being echoed in the real world", and that the characters were relieved by this. Abdul-Mateen thought the scene was important in its depiction of two black men with "a vessel to explore their sexuality and to understand who they are". Describing the filming, he said that "shooting in the rain is never easy" and estimated it took three to four hours. Harris saw the ending as "pragmatic": they considered showing more details about whether the arrangement was succeeding in practice, but chose to leave the ambiguity. Abdul-Mateen noted that Karl has a cat at the end of the episode, which means "he has something to take care of". He thought it could imply that Karl has matured, but is still lonesome.

== Analysis ==
The episode is a romance: Danny, Karl and Theo are in a love triangle. Dan Stubbs of NME and Jim Vorel of Paste characterised it as a "spiritual sequel" to "San Junipero". Stubbs saw that as in "San Junipero", the episode "finds the beauty and ugliness in a new form of romance". Writing for Vox, Alex Abad-Santos compared that in "San Junipero", Kelly and Yorkie "play semi-artificial, digital-only versions of themselves", like Danny and Karl. Stubbs and Wired's Matt Reynolds found that in "Striking Vipers", the technology is not the focus of the episode—instead its implications and the human stories are. Zack Handlen of The A.V. Club analysed that the episode has humour but it is "never designed to undercut the emotional development of the characters". Sexual and gender fluidity, infidelity and love and friendship are major themes, with The Guardian's Lucy Mangan writing that "every boundary is porous". Critics identified a large number of questions posed by the episode. Louisa Mellor wrote in Den of Geek that the episode initially asks about Danny and Karl's sexual activity: "Is it cheating? Porn? Love?" It also asks if they are gay or bisexual. Commenting in Wired, Victoria Turk viewed the episode as making a case that engaging in virtual reality porn is infidelity. Tasha Robinson, a reviewer for The Verge, said that Karl's attempts to persuade Danny to keep the relationship going is "needy and manipulative" and characteristic of an "imbalanced relationship", with Karl going back and forth between "defending their virtual trysts as meaningless fun" and "claiming they mean everything and are worth any risk".

Critics explored the implications of Danny and Karl's relationship. Vorel wondered whether it was a romantic or physical connection, how Karl's choice to play a woman related to his masculinity, and whether there would still be attraction if Danny and Karl swapped characters. He called the pair "two alpha males" who feel "shock and embarrassment" when made to confront their sexualities. Michael Ahr of Den of Geek suggested that the pair could be suppressing their homosexuality or "indulging in the objectification of their avatars' hyper-sexualized appearances". Den of Geek's Alec Bojalad gave a partial answer that "there is at least some homosexual energy" but "Roxette and Lance's bodies are an essential part of the equation". Bojalad found that despite uncertainty over their sexuality, Danny and Karl "needed each other in ways they didn't fully understand because they didn't have the language for it". Abad-Santos suggested that Karl enjoys "letting Danny take control sexually". He also recalled playing Chun-Li in Street Fighter II, the only female character, as did lots of gay children because it gave them "the freedom to be someone ... who [they] could never be". Handlen said that Karl could be interpreted as a "potentially closeted trans woman ... but the text stops short of suggesting he's going to make any steps towards transitioning or understanding himself better". Vorel reviewed that the episode "chooses not to judge its characters", while The Atlantic's David Sims said it "withholds answers for most of the questions".

Some reviewers drew meaning from the technological aspect of Danny and Karl's relationship. Sims analysed that the episode raises questions about "how sexuality on the internet is continuing to evolve". Stubbs queried whether the "meat person or the avatar" is the real version of us, when "we spend our leisure time in a virtual world and our real lives wearing our work masks". He also suggested that a "virtual/real life balance" could be as fundamental as a work–life balance. Hugh Montgomery, writing for the BBC, found a "pornographic quality of computer game violence" and Abad-Santos saw "Striking Vipers" as serving to connect "video game addiction and porn addiction" as well as "violence and men's sexuality". Another perspective came from Bojalad, who wrote that the episode sees video games as "a safe, consequence-free simulation space for little boys and eventually little men to work though the complex feelings they've so often ignored". Ahr similarly described that Striking Vipers X lets the characters "shed their culturally ingrained male inhibitions and admit their devotion to each other in a way that society discourages in real life".

Critics found that Danny and Karl's sexual activity gave them what they were lacking in their real lives. According to Bojalad, Danny and Karl's younger selves have a "classic and recognizable college student dynamic". Ahr wrote that the "sudden" time skip creates an "atmosphere of disillusionment", with a "contrast between the party atmosphere of the intro and the mundane backyard barbecue". Shelli Nicole of Architectural Digest commented that the game juxtaposes the monotony of their homes' interior design—simple, realistic suburban settings. While Danny lives an "idyllic suburban life", as Stubbs put it, Vorel and Vulture's Charles Bramesco said he has a mid-life ennui. His sex with Theo is for conception, not enjoyment. In contrast, Stubbs called Karl a "rich executive living the bachelor dream"; he fits the trope of a "ladies' man" and dates younger women. Bojalad believed that Danny and Karl each wanted what the other person had: Karl's freedom or Danny's security. Mellor wrote that Danny gets "energy, abs, joint mobility" and "virility" when playing Lance, which he has been deprived of through ageing and parenthood. Additionally, she wrote that Theo has a "need for excitement in the desert of adult responsibility".

Some critics noted foreshadowing in the initial scenes, eleven years before the main story. Bojalad and Ahr both commented that Theo is aroused by Danny treating her like a stranger, a sign of her later desires to meet strangers at a bar. Reynolds interpreted that the roleplay "sets up this idea that the desire to be someone a little different is a completely human thing". Additionally, Karl's mock-humping of Danny while playing Striking Vipers was seen by Bramesco to indicate homoerotic tension. Ahr stated that early on, Theo tells Danny he should talk "more openly and frequently" to Karl, and communication between them is a central tension in the episode. The episode also makes reference to other Black Mirror instalments: it shows products made by SaitoGemu, of "Playtest", and TCKR, of "San Junipero"; and Karl's pinball machine has different gameplay modes that can be seen to reference locations from past episodes.

== Reception ==
On the review aggregator Rotten Tomatoes, the episode holds an approval rating of 74% based on 38 reviews. The website summarises that critics found it "well-produced and thought-provoking", but that "holding back its emotional punch" makes it less powerful than similar episodes. Out of five stars, the episode received ratings of five stars from the BBC, four stars in The Independent, two stars in The Telegraph and one star in Vulture. It also attained a graded rating of an A in The A.V. Club. In positive criticism, Stubbs said it was "one of the most sensitive, emotionally affecting" instalments, with Mangan concurring that it was "one of the most tender", and Vorel opined it to be "among the series' most pitch-perfect achievements". Ahr wrote that it had a great "level of literary merit, allowing for all sorts of analysis for those willing to plumb its depths". However, in The Telegraph, Ed Power panned the script as "listless".

Critics identified various parts of the plot to be weak. Power criticised the occurrence of virtual reality "as a plot device" as overused in Black Mirror. While Vorel saw Danny and Karl's reactions to be "profoundly well-earned", and Bojalad saw their sex scenes as "surprisingly raw and powerful", Bramesco did not see a "foundation of desire" leading to the first kiss. Vorel and Robinson wanted further information about how or why people are using Striking Vipers X as a sex simulator, or why it was designed to have this functionality. Contrastingly, Stubbs opined that the initial in-game scenes were "incredibly funny" and the rest were "brilliant". Turk criticised Roxette's description of sex as "the full orchestra" for women to be "awful" and "corny", and Bramesco and the Digital Spy critics Ali Griffiths and Morgan Jeffery disliked Lance's "don't feel like a gay thing" line. Sims said that the ending was "odd" and "slightly melancholy". Turk thought Danny, Karl and Theo's once-a-year arrangement is a dated solution because it maintains Danny and Theo's "traditional hetero monogamous marriage with two kids and an annual family barbecue", rather than meaningfully integrating any change into it. Similarly, Bramesco thought that the supposedly happy ending works by "gracefully eliding" every day of the year but one.

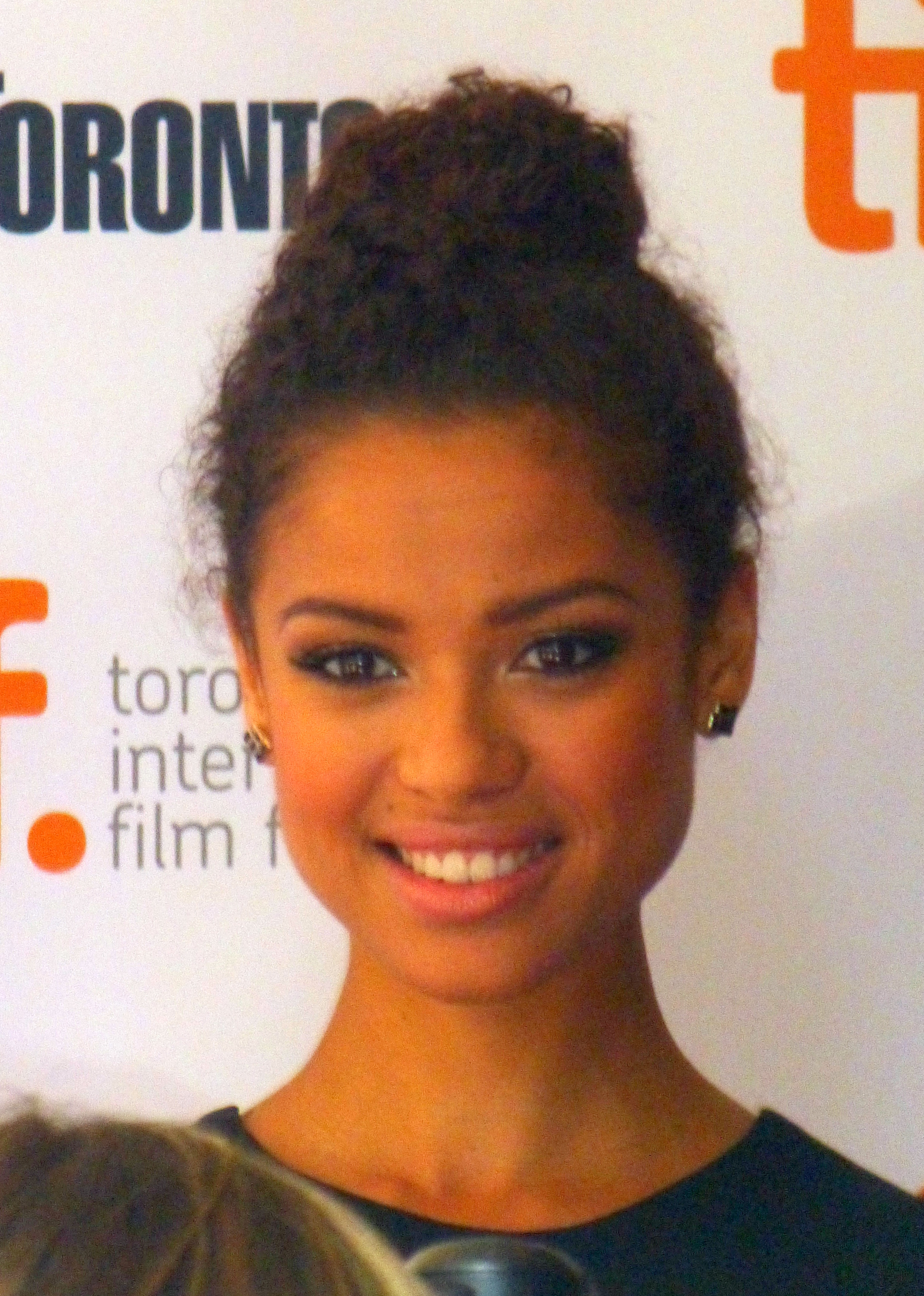
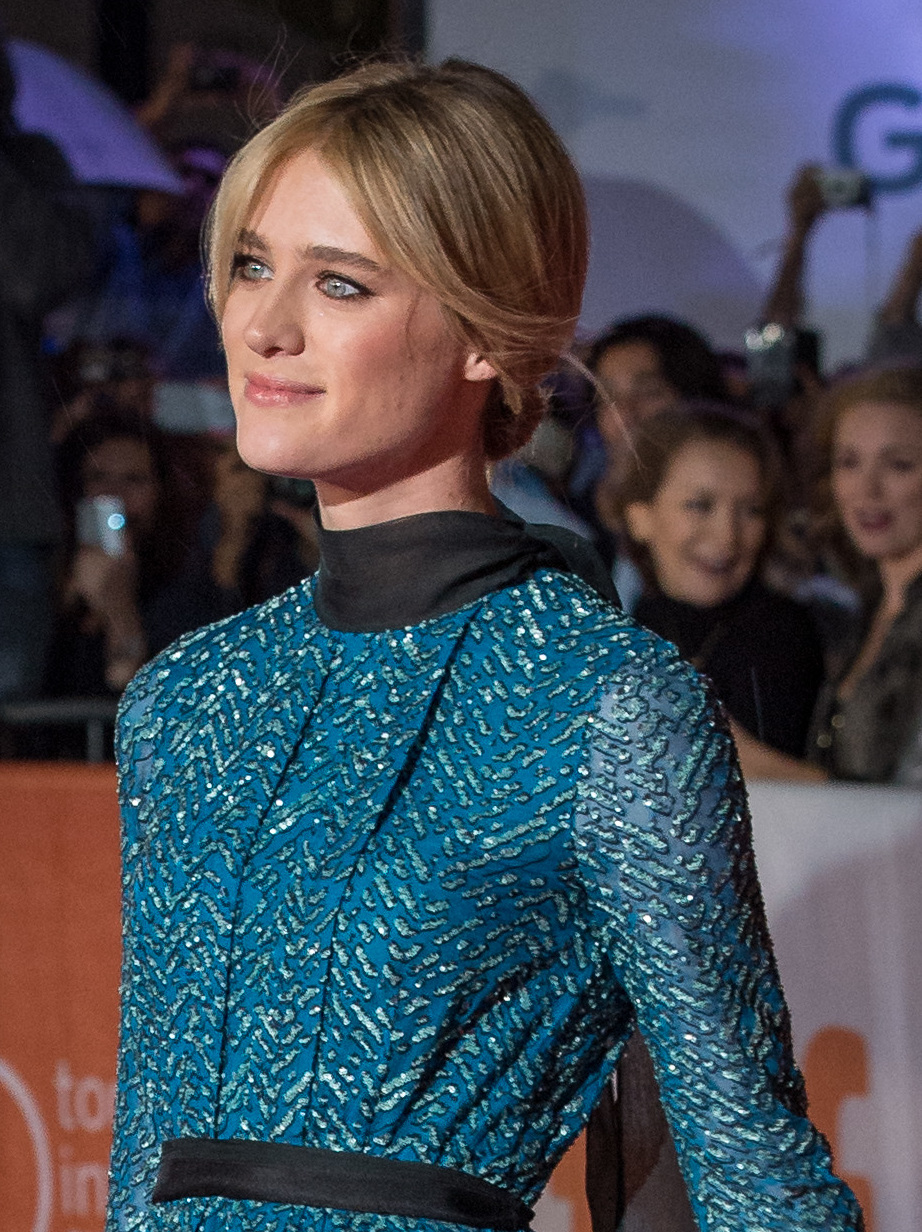
Some critics found the episode weaker than "San Junipero", which starred Gugu Mbatha-Raw (left) as Kelly and Mackenzie Davis (right) as Yorkie.

Comparisons to "San Junipero" based on quality were largely unfavourable, such as that of The Guardian's Guy Lodge, who saw "Striking Vipers" as "hollow by comparison". Reynolds thought that the episode's themes were "explored in a more gripping way" in "San Junipero". Similarly, Bramesco reviewed the episode as a "dunderheaded thought experiment" which was like "San Junipero" but where "everything that could have gone wrong ... does so". Sims found it "nervier" and "less swooning" than the other romance episodes, lacking the "rebellious fun" of "San Junipero" but also the "tragic tinge" of "Be Right Back" and "Hang the DJ". Similarly, Power critiqued that "San Junipero" and "Hang the DJ" had "something genuinely profound" to say about love, but "Striking Vipers" does not. As such, only the former two episodes "earned" their happy ending. Griffiths and Jeffery criticised that "queerness is always neatly hidden away in virtual worlds" in Black Mirror, both in "San Junipero" and "Striking Vipers". They stated that "Striking Vipers" did not address its themes deeply enough, such as by not showing on-screen the conversation Danny has where he confesses the situation to Theo. However, Montgomery dissented, writing that "Striking Vipers" was similar to "Be Right Back" and "San Junipero" as three of "the finest and most soulful" episodes.

Critics were divided on whether the episode addressed the questions it raises to a sufficient degree. Griffiths and Jeffery said that it "never really gets to the crux of what it means for Danny to be attracted to Karl" as Roxette, and does not show enough of Karl's perspective. Lodge argued that there is a "frustratingly regressive tone" as the episode is "embarrassed and coy about its subject matter". However, Turk said that "enough was shown ... to raise the most interesting theme": that Danny and Karl are attracted to each other only when Karl is a woman. Vorel, Mellor and Robinson commented that the episode was surprisingly mature, with Bojalad summarising that it "presents a stunning example of reckoning with technology and one's own wants and desires in a mature, adult fashion". Montgomery thought it was a good premise for the show as it is "both technologically plausible and richly philosophical". Jon Paul of Syfy Wire found the topic of how black men "struggle with the energy that comes with exploring intimacy" and "suppress themselves" interesting, along with how men behave "relatively distant and neutral". He linked this to toxic masculinity. Lodge criticised that "queer desire is treated ... as a disorienting byproduct of alien technology rather than a matter of the heart" and that the implications of Karl enjoying sexual experiences in a woman's body are "glibly grazed over".

Some reviewers found the characterisation to be lacking. Reynolds wanted to "understand the characters a little more" and Handlen said the episode "never quite gets under the surface" of them. Abad-Santos went further, saying that Danny and Karl seem to "exist just to raise points and get us to the end of a thought-provoking argument, rather than as people in a meaningful story". Bramesco and Power said that, respectively, the pair had "zero demonstrated chemistry", and are not convincing with their "supposed transcendent charge". In contrast, Fiona Sturges of The Independent praised the "nuanced depiction of marriage, parenthood" and their consequent "erosion of spontaneity", and Handlen saw Danny, Karl and Theo as being given "a measure of dignity and compassion they might not have found on other shows".

Critical comments about the acting and directing were positive. Stubbs reviewed the all-black cast as further establishing Black Mirror as "a bastion of diversity ... not as a box-ticking exercise". Handlen and Mellor found the performances "solid" and "strong", respectively, with Mellor praising Mackie and Klementieff in particular. Handlen wrote that Abdul-Mateen "is terrific as Karl, selling the character's charm and enthusiasm and just absolutely landing the heartbreak". Ahr said that Beharie's acting was "as expressive as they come". Vorel also praised Mackie, Abdul-Mateen and Beharie. Handlen praised Harris's direction, analysing that the shots often position Danny and Karl in "traditional fighting game poses". Mellor and Sims praised the filming style and scenery of the in-game scenes, with the former commenting that Harris "successfully created two totally different textures for each world".

=== Episode rankings ===
"Striking Vipers" ranked as follows on critics' lists of the 23 instalments of Black Mirror, from best to worst:

- 4th – Tim Molloy, TheWrap
- 13th – Aubrey Page, Collider
- 14th – Travis Clark, Business Insider
- 15th – James Hibberd, Entertainment Weekly
- 16th – Morgan Jeffery and Rosie Fletcher, Digital Spy
- 17th – Matt Miller, Esquire
- 21st – Ed Power, The Telegraph
- 23rd – Charles Bramesco, Vulture

IndieWire authors ranked the 22 Black Mirror instalments excluding Bandersnatch by quality, giving "Striking Vipers" a position of 14th. Instead of by quality, Proma Khosla of Mashable ranked the episodes by tone, concluding that "Striking Vipers" was the third-least pessimistic episode of the show.

=== Awards ===
"Striking Vipers" was nominated for three awards: an ADG Excellence in Production Design Award, a Golden Reel Award and a Producers Guild of America Award.

Awards and nominations received by "Striking Vipers"
Year	Award	Category	Recipients	Result	Ref.
2019	ADG Excellence in Production Design Award	Excellence in Production Design for a Television Movie or Limited Series	Anne Beauchamp	Nominated	
2020	Golden Reel Awards	Outstanding Achievement in Sound Editing — Episodic Long Form – Effects/Foley	Steve Browell, Mathias Schuster, Barnaby Smyth	Nominated	
2020	Producers Guild of America Awards	Outstanding Producer of Streamed or Televised Motion Pictures	Annabel Jones, Charlie Brooker and Kate Glover	Nominated	
