= Siren (TV series) =

2018 American drama television series

- Genre: Fantasy drama
- Created by: Eric Wald; Dean White
- Starring: Alex Roe; Eline Powell; Ian Verdun; Rena Owen; Fola Evans-Akingbola; Sibongile Mlambo; Tiffany Lonsdale
- Composers: Michael A. Levine; Anton Sanko
- Country of origin: United States
- Original language: English
- No. of seasons: 3
- No. of episodes: 36

Production
- Executive producers: Emily Whitesell; Eric Wald; Dean White; Brad Luff; Nate Hopper; RD Robb; Michael Gans; Richard Register
- Producers: Peter Lhotka; Heather Thomason
- Production location: Vancouver, British Columbia
- Cinematography: Stephen Jackson; Mark Chow; Brian Pearson; Lindsay George
- Camera setup: Single-camera
- Running time: 41–45 minutes
- Production company: Stockton Drive Inc.

Original release
- Network: Freeform
- Release: March 29, 2018 – May 28, 2020

Siren is an American fantasy drama television series that follows Ryn Fisher (played by Eline Powell), a young siren who comes to a small coastal town looking for her abducted older sister. The series premiered on Freeform on March 29, 2018. The first season included 10 episodes. In May 2019, the series was renewed for a third season which premiered on April 2, 2020. The series was canceled in August 2020.

== Premise ==
The coastal town of Bristol Cove, Washington, known for its legends of once being home to mermaids and mermen for centuries, is turned upside down when a mysterious young woman named Ryn Fisher (Eline Powell) appears and begins wreaking havoc upon the small fishing town to look for her captured older sister Donna (Sibongile Mlambo) who was abducted at the hands of the local military. Marine biologists Ben Pownall (Alex Roe) and Maddie Bishop (Fola Evans-Akingbola) work together to find out who and what drove this primal hunter of the deep sea to land.

By Season Two, more merpeople started appearing in Bristol Cove due to the pollution in the nearby waters and the sonic waves from the oil rig. Meanwhile, Pownall's paralysis is gradually being counteracted by Ryn's mermaid stem cells.

In Season Three, Ben, Maddie, and Ryn contend with the mermaid Tia (Tiffany Lonsdale) who plans to coerce all merpeople tribes/colonies to join her in her fight to overthrow humanity. And Ryn's daughter, who has been carried by a surrogate, must be protected at all costs. To further escalate matters, Ted Pownall has finally acknowledged the existence of merpeople and seems to be on a dangerous path, just as his paternal great-great-great-great-grandfather Charles had.

== Cast and characters ==
=== Main ===
- Eline Powell as Ryn Fisher, a strange young adult mermaid with a dark secret. She comes ashore in search of her elder sister, who has been accidentally captured by fishermen of the North Star fishing vessel. She eventually comes to realize that not all humans are murderous, and becomes Ben and Maddie's lover. To help Ben's mother Elaine, she willingly donates her aquatic stem cells to help counteract the paralysis in Elaine's legs. Upon mating with a bearded merman of another colony when she couldn't find Levi, she has a daughter named Hope.
- Alex Roe as Ben Pownall, a marine biologist who helps Ryn when she first comes to shore. He is entranced by her melodious, irresistibly hypnotic siren song, which she deploys on him as a defense mechanism without knowing the full extent of its effects on humans. Ben later becomes Ryn's lover, and his struggle to untangle his affection for her from the obsessive thoughts that result from hearing her siren song becomes a significant part of his character arc. To help Ryn and her kind, he resorts to injecting himself with the stem cells of a partially transformed mermaid corpse and subsequently develops abilities found in merpeople – heightened hearing and reflexes, accelerated healing, and the ability to hold his breath for extended periods of time. At the end of season 3, following the fight against Tia, Ben goes missing in the ocean.
- Fola Evans-Akingbola as Maddie Bishop, a marine biologist and Ben's girlfriend in season one and two. She works at Bristol Cove Marine Research Center with Ben. Her father is the sheriff of Bristol Cove. Her estranged mother is Susan, who returns after nine months in Season 2. Like Ben, Maddie is entranced by Ryn's melodious, irresistibly hypnotic siren song but doesn't seem to develop the same feelings of possessiveness as a result. She later becomes Ryn's lover.
- Ian Verdun as Xander McClure, a deep-sea fisherman who seeks to discover the truth about the existence of mermaids and mermen. He eventually joins the Bristol Cove Sheriff Department in an attempt to save those he cares about more against the enemy merpeople. In season 3, following the death of Dale, Xander is sworn in as the new Sheriff of Bristol Cove.
- Sibongile Mlambo as Donna (season 1; special guest star season 3), a mystical and deceptively powerful mermaid who is Ryn's older sister. She was unintentionally caught in a fishing net and taken by the military. She was killed, unintentionally, by Xander. Her spirit eventually contacts Helen from the merpeople's version of the spirit world when her body has been grave-robbed. Her ghost later instructs Cami and those on Ryn's side to help Ryn fight Tia.
- Rena Owen as Helen Hawkins, an eccentric woman who seems to know much more about the merfolk than she claims. It is revealed that she is descended from merfolk and shares ancestry with Ben and the other Pownalls. She eventually learns that she has a long-lost relative from the Marzdan family, most of whom are known as hybrids. She discovers that her mother Daphne was one of the merpeople/human hybrids who was promised to fellow hybrid Johnathon Rooney, but had chosen Helen's human father instead. This resulted in the death of Mr. Hawkins, a few weeks before Helen was born. She is eventually contacted by the spirit of her merman love Sarge and, later, Donna's. It is later revealed that she is, in fact, the great-granddaughter of the half mermaid/human daughter of Charles Pownall and his mermaid lover, from her mother's side.
- Tiffany Lonsdale as Tia (season 3), a new mermaid from another colony/tribe of the northern seas around Bristol Cove, Washington. The human locals refer to her as a "sea monster". Her intent on arriving on land is to coerce all other merpeople tribes and colonies to join her in putting an end to humans or perish by her wrath. She choose her name from Tiamat, Water Deity of the Seas. In the past, Tia was caught by humans while she was pregnant and she lost her unborn child as a result of how she was treated. As of "Survivor" and "Life and Death," she has since gained leadership of her own colony and is now bent on unifying all fellow merpeople colonies/tribes to eradicate humanity. To symbolize her higher status as the alpha female, she has orange markings on her tail and chest. She learns of Ryn's infant daughter Hope from Hunter, who she threatens with death if she does not join her and her colony. According to Helen, she is a tyrant. During the final battle, Tia is killed by Ryn causing the rest of Tia's followers to stop fighting and acknowledge Ryn as their new leader.

=== Recurring ===
- Chad Rook as Chris Mueller, a fisherman who was taken to the military base after being injured by Donna. He was held at the facility where he escaped with Donna, only to later fall under their power-mad influence in harvesting the merpeople and their superhuman abilities for their own purposes.
- Curtis Lum as Calvin Lee, a fisherman who is also a friend and roommate of Xander. His girlfriend is Janine, who works at the Anchor cafe. In Season Three, he proposes to her and she accepts. They get married in "Til Death Do Us Part".
- Ron Yuan as Aldon Decker, an expert on merpeople who worked for the military for many years. He experimented on and became obsessed with Donna and her siren song which prompted him to drown himself once Donna herself had died.
- Gil Birmingham as Dale Bishop, the sheriff of the Bristol Cove Sheriff Department and Maddie's stepfather. He is descended from the Haida people. He is the third human to discover the existence of merpeople and becomes another ally. Since the Season 3 premiere "Borders," he has been looking for Nicole at the behest of Xander. During the sound-based terror attack on Bristol Cove and its neighboring towns, Dale is among those affected. Before succumbing to it, Dale helped a crashed car where a mother driving it was affected. This left Maddie devastated and he is succeeded by Xander.
- David A. Kaye as Jerry, a man who works at Bristol Cove Marine Research Center along with Ben and Maddie. He is the one who makes fake IDs for the merpeople (thereby officially naming them) in "Oil and Water"; completely unaware of their true selves and nature.
- Garcelle Beauvais as Susan Bishop (voiced season 1, season 2), Maddie's mother and Dale's ex-wife who tries to make amends with her estranged family.
- David Cubitt as Ted Pownall, Ben's father, head of the town's fishery industry and whose great-great-great-grandfather Charles first discovered merpeople in the mid-1800s. He eventually comes to realization that his family was anything but crazy since "Revelations" when he saw Tia trying to kill him but was saved by Ryn. Now distrustful of mermaids and the probable threat they represent, he seems to have set on a dangerous path as his great-great-great-grandfather Charles had.
- Sarah-Jane Redmond as Elaine Pownall, Ben's mother who became paralyzed after a boating accident a decade earlier. She is eventually given renewed treatment via aquatic stem cells from Ryn's mermaid DNA. As a byproduct, she is capable of holding her breath underwater for about four minutes, though her legs remain somewhat paralyzed.
- Tammy Gillis as Marissa Staub, the deputy of the Bristol Cove Sheriff's Department.
- Hannah Levien as Janine, Calvin's girlfriend who is a bartender at the Anchor. She eventually accepts his proposal, and they get married in "Til Death Do Us Part."

=== Supporting ===
- Andrew Jenkins as Doug Pownall, Ben's older brother, who is aware of the existence of merpeople.
- Anthony Harrison as Admiral Harrison, the head of the military base in Season 1. He was most likely fired and replaced by David Kyle.
- Jill Teed as Patti McClure, the wife of the late Captain Sean McClure and the mother of Xander. Debuting in "Being Human" she expressed her sorrow at her husband's sudden demise by "getting tangled in a fishing net" and blamed Ted Pownall for letting his greed for money lead, if unintentionally, to such a tragedy. Many months later, "Entrapment", she received news that her late husband's corpse had been found and now has found peace. In "Mommy and Me" she expresses her doubts to Ted Pownall.
- Natalee Linez as Nicole Martinez, a military replacement for Decker who becomes the girlfriend of Xander. She continues Decker's research on mermaids. As of "Serenity" she has then disappeared.
- Luc Roderique as Ian Sutton, an environmentalist and news reporter who supports Ben and Maddie on bringing down the Klesco Oil Company for destroying marine life and their aquatic ecosystems in search of natural oil from the depths of the seas. He soon starts to get suspicious of Ryn and tries to take her, only to drown in the water after driving off a cliff. In order to save the merpeople and the hybrids, Ben had left him to drown.

=== Merpeople ===
Besides sisters Ryn and Donna, the following mermaid and mermen characters are:

- Sedale Threatt Jr. as Levi, a merman warrior. Mentored by Ben and considers him and Maddie friends. Levi killed Xander's dad Captain Sean McClure per Katrina's command in retribution for humans detaining and torturing Donna. He eventually learns to trust certain humans and considers Ben Pownall a friend of his kind.
- Aylya Marzolf as Katrina, a mermaid alpha leader who was twice defeated by Ryn in combat. She is the most fierce and independent of the colony, displaying brute force against both humans and mermaids if need be. It is later revealed that she was separated from Tia's own colony/tribe as an infant, and raised by Ryn and Donna's colony. She refuses Ryn's offer to return and takes her own life by slitting her throat with Ryn's spear during the fight on an island.
- Hugo Ateo as Frank, better known as Sarge, a merman protector who becomes infatuated with Helen Hawkins and she with him. He dies during the attack on Klesco Oil Company' oil platform. Many months later, Helen finds a way to contact his essence with the help of Eliza.
- Millan Tesfazgi as Cami, a mermaid who is the daughter of the late Donna and niece of Ryn. She seeks revenge for her mother's death. Cami eventually meets her infant cousin Hope.
- Alvina August as Viv, a curly-haired mermaid from Ryn and Donna's colony who is a close friend of Eliza and Cami.
- Georgia Scarlet Waters as Eliza, a blonde mermaid from Ryn and Donna's colony. She develops a kind of romantic attraction towards Rick Marzdan. She is one of few mermaids who are healers capable of entering the echo chamber that mostly neutralizes the effects of the siren song. She eventually utilizes her knowledge of the spirit world to help Helen contact Sarge's spirit again.
- Katie Keough as Hunter, an olive-skinned mermaid from Ryn and Donna's colony. First appeared on land in "The Last Mermaid" along with Eliza, she confronted Xander McClure. She is known as a natural born hunter and fierce warrior as seen in Season 3 where she trains Ryn for battle against Tia. To avoid death, she divulges the existence of Ryn's daughter Hope to her, whom she later kidnapped. Tia later left her chained up for Ryn to find so that she can deliver a message.
- Aryeh-Or as Ryn's Mate, an unnamed olive-skinned bearded merman whom Ryn had found in place of Levi who she couldn't find. Wanting to conceive a full-blooded merperson to ensure the survival of their colony/tribe and others, Ryn had taught him how to copulate as humans do. With aid from Helen, his sperm was taken and secretly implanted in Meredith's womb, from which his and Ryn's mermaid daughter is delivered albeit with difficulty. He eventually returns to land with Levi to take his infant daughter back, so he can teach her how to hunt.
- Deniz Akdeniz as Robb Wellens (season 3), a new acquaintance of Madelyn "Maddie" Bishop who is ultimately revealed to be a merman from a colony/tribe from Nome, Alaska. Like Tia, he is more human as Maddie had not the slightest inkling of him being otherwise and had lost his ability to change form.
- Sisse Marie and Ben Sullivan as Yura, the leader of the merpeople colony in Nome, Alaska that uses a special pool that enables a female mermaid of this tribe to become a merman for reproductive purposes. Marie portrays Yura's female form and Sullivan portrays Yura's male form.
- Alix West Lefler as Hope, the daughter of Ryn and her mate, who was secretly implanted into Meredith's uterus by her parents Bryan and Leena in order for her parents to have a full-blooded merperson grandchild of their own. A few days after her birth, her father and Levi took her into the ocean, so they could teach her how to hunt. After, she was reunited with her mother, she was taught the siren song by Ryn and she was later kidnapped by Hunter in order to bring her to Tia. Hope is rescued by Ben and is reunited with Ryn.

=== Human/Merpeople Hybrids ===
When humans and merpeople secretly mated over the centuries, they produce children with a varied blend of bloodlines, from one-eighth, to one-quarter, to half of both species. In addition to Helen, the following characters are:

- Caroline Cave as Beth Marzdan, a long-lost blood relative of Helen and the estranged sister of Rick who leads a community of human/merpeople hybrids.
- Daniel Cudmore as Bryan, a human/merman hybrid, husband of Leena, and father of Meredith, who is associated with Beth and can act hostile towards the Pownalls for their connection to Charles Pownall. When Ryn comes to ask help to have a baby, Bryan arranges for her unborn child to be secretly implanted into his daughter's uterus. After some weeks Meredith suffers from great pain but Bryan refuses to move her to a hospital so, his wife Leena, asks for Ryn's help. When Ryn, along with Cami, arrives at Bryan's house, she stays with Meredith while Cami kills Bryan, when he enters in the house.
- Brendan Fletcher (series 2) as Rick Marzdan, brother of Helen, unknown to her until revealed by a DNA test familial link.
- Kaaren de Zilva as Dr. Leena, personal physician and secretly the wife of Bryan and mother of Meredith. She secretly injected the embryo of Ryn's unborn child into her daughter in an attempt to have a full-blooded merperson grandchild of her own.
- Kiomi Pyke as Meredith, the secret daughter of Bryan and Dr. Leena who had the embryo of Ryn's unborn child implanted into her uterus in order for her parents to have a full-blooded merperson grandchild of their own. She expressed doubts at what would happen to her carrying a child that is not hers. She eventually manages to deliver Ryn's daughter, but dies as her heart could not take the strain. Ryn then told her niece, Camryn "Cami", to bury her as one of them.

=== Guest ===
- Brian Anthony Wilson as Sean McClure, Xander's father and captain of the fishing motorboat The North Star. He was killed by Levi in "Dead in the Water" per orders of the alpha mermaid Katrina. Months later, his corpse accidentally resurfaces.

== Episodes ==
=== Series overview ===
Season	Episodes	Originally released	
Season	Episodes	First released	Last released
1	10	March 29, 2018	May 24, 2018
2	16	January 24, 2019	August 1, 2019
3	10	April 2, 2020	May 28, 2020

=== Season 1 (2018) ===
No. overall	No. in season	Title	Directed by	Written by	Original release date	U.S. viewers (millions)
1	1	"Pilot"	Scott Stewart	Teleplay by : Eric Wald; Story by : Eric Wald & Dean White	March 29, 2018	0.87
Bristol Cove has been known for having been home to mermaids for many centuries. Stories about such marine creatures have been passed down to children in many generations. Marine biologist Ben Powell is forced to confront and believe the stories with the arrival of a strange young woman named Ryn who Ben finds crossing the road naked as he gets her into some clothes. She is secretly a mermaid in search of her sister who has been captured, but struggles with lack of communication with humans. Ryn's older sister and Chris, a crew member and fisherman on board Bristol Cove's well-known fishing boat the North Star, were captured by the military. When Ryn unexpectedly requires marine biologist Ben Powell and his girlfriend Madeline "Maddie" Bishop's aid to help her find her sister. Things start to go downhill in the peaceful town of Bristol Cove, and the two are forced to work together to locate both Ryn's sister and Chris.
2	2	"The Lure"	Nick Copus	Eric Wald	March 29, 2018	0.87
Ben, Xander, and Xander's father search the ocean in hopes of catching a mermaid to help locate Chris and solidify their belief that the government is hiding secrets within their walls. Aboard the North Star, Ben discovers a strange device in the water which emits the sounds of a mermaid that could lead to Chris. They decide to study it in case it is being tracked. After returning to shore and obtaining a long shirt to cover herself, Ryn discovers Helen and manages to communicate that she is looking for her sister. At the Military lab, tests are being conducted using Ryn's sister's stem cells and they come upon a frightening conclusion that the mermaids are not all what they appear to be. Ben shows Maddie the video footage recorded in the seal den where he dived in the water to save Ryn but was met with her violence instead. Ben and Maddie take the strange device to Helen, which causes Ryn to become upset hearing her sister's painful screams. On the hunt for her sister, Ryn and Maddie are brought closer as she learns the ways of the humans and their stories.
3	3	"Interview With a Mermaid"	Jay Karas	Emily Whitesell	April 5, 2018	0.62
Dale and the local police's investigation starts pointing directly to Ryn. Ben and Maddie convince Ryn to let them do some basic medical tests on her while also getting to know more about her people. Meanwhile, Xander and Calvin's search for Chris heats up when they locate the nurse who works at the military bunker. Ryn then goes to a party where she learns more about trust.
4	4	"On the Road"	Steven A. Adelson	Elle Triedman	April 12, 2018	0.68
Thanks to the mermaid Donna, Chris escapes from the military base as he makes his way back to Bristol Cove. Meanwhile, Ryn starts to show signs of dehydration from being away from the ocean too long, and Ben and Maddie race against time to try to get her back into the ocean.
5	5	"Curse of the Starving Class"	John Badham	Michael Gans & Richard Register	April 19, 2018	0.69
Ryn and Donna return to Bristol Cove to seek out Ben when there is over-fishing in their waters due to "recently" relaxed government regulations. However, Donna is not trusting towards humans thanks to the torture she endured before she escaped. Ben and Maddie deduce that the government and military causing the overfishing, in order to catch more mermaids. Helen reveals to Donna a huge secret about herself.
6	6	"Showdown"	Martha Coolidge	Holly Brix	April 26, 2018	0.59
As Donna befriends Helen during the constant overfishing, Ben has an encounter with Aldon Decker at his mother's charity event. During their conversation, Ben deduces that Decker has heard a siren's song before and that it's stuck in his head; hence why he's involved with the military to find them. Meanwhile, tensions between Donna and Ryn begin to flare as they are split over their opinions of humans: thanks to her time at the military base, Donna wants to kill them all but Ryn refuses to resort to needless bloodshed. As the two part ways, Donna returns to her colony, but Ryn gets caught by Marissa.
7	7	"Dead in the Water"	Nick Copus	Ian Sobel & Matt Morgan	May 3, 2018	0.51
Maddie rushes to the police station when she hears that Ryn was taken there by Marissa to be interrogated. As Ben and Xander return to the ocean with Sean to get some answers, they are attacked by some merpeople, and a tragedy occurs.
8	8	"Being Human"	Amanda Tapping	Liz Maccie	May 10, 2018	0.50
Ryn learns a new emotion as all of Bristol Cove mourns the death of Sean following the incident on the ocean. Each of its citizens copes with Sean's death in various ways. Ryn also shares some information about her culture with Ben and Maddie. Xander stumbles across a big secret.
9	9	"Street Fight"	Joe Menendez	Zach Ayers	May 17, 2018	0.62
Donna comes ashore with the alpha female Katrina and a merman warrior named Levi in order to bring Ryn back to their home, but Katrina and Levi have other plans. Ryn explains to Ben the reason she is to be killed....it is due to the fear of another imminent genocide that happened before and the story of the child of a man and a mermaid. In light of the merpeople attacking Bristol Cove, Sheriff Bishop works to put an end to it, Meanwhile, Xander prepares himself to avenge the loss of his father. The town soon becomes a battleground as merpeople and humans clash for the first time.
10	10	"Aftermath"	Nick Copus	Eric Wald & Emily Whitesell	May 24, 2018	0.66
Following Donna succumbing to the gunshot wound caused by Xander, the siren song that Ben and Decker hear starts to take its toll on them. Aldon is found dead as a result and Ryn rescues Ben before he drowns. Meanwhile, Sheriff Bishop deals with the recent crime rise and has to explain the cause of it to the town council. Helen Hawkins also reveals the history of her family and her true heritage to Ben, Maddie, and Ryn. She, like Ben, is descended from Charles Pownall and is one-eighth mermaid as her ancestor was Charles's mermaid. Maddie also gets a surprise after she finally hears from her estranged mother Susan. Ryn expresses regret as she realizes that her song has badly affected Ben and, indirectly, Maddie's relationship with him. She decides to leave Bristol Cove in order to let him recover.

=== Season 2 (2019) ===
No. overall	No. in season	Title	Directed by	Written by	Original release date	U.S. viewers (millions)
11	1	"The Arrival"	Matt Hastings	Emily Whitesell	January 24, 2019	0.71
Madelyn's estranged mother, Susan, arrives in town, after a five-month absence, to a cold reception by her daughter. Xander feels remorse for the death of Donna. Sea lions at the marine conservation are acting weird. Whales are discovered on the beach. The council removes Sheriff Bishop from office. Ryn senses something is wrong and goes back into the ocean to investigate, finds a dead mermaid and is hit by a strong sonic wave. Back on shore, Ben, Maddie and Ryn discover a dead mermaid in the midst of transformation and an injured Levi. A pack of merpeople, along with the dark-haired female from before, arrive in Helen's house. Lt. Nicole Martinez arrives in town and seduces Xander.
12	2	"The Wolf at the Door"	Amanda Row	Eric Wald	January 31, 2019	0.53
Ben attends an addiction support group meeting in an attempt to cope with Ryn's siren song's hypnotically soothing affects. The merpeople pack learns about human interactions. Kelvin contacts a news organization to attempt to sell them the story about the existence of merpeople. The pack is starting to weaken from being away from water. While in the woods with the pack trying to hunt, Cami is attacked by a male wolf. Ryn learns to drive. Xander is denied a loan from the bank. The pack rejuvenates at a remote shallow bay, but is interrupted by drunk patrons from the bar.
13	3	"Natural Order"	Joe Menendez	Heather Thomason	February 7, 2019	0.42
The pack is trying to adapt to life on land. Ryn is weakened from the prolonged absence from water. Ben and Maddie devised a plan to bring the ocean to the pack since they cannot return to water. Katrina finds Ryn in her weakened state and challenges her to become the alpha. Ben & Maddie records the siren's song to hopefully study and block it. Helen discovers a long-lost relative of hers through a DNA test, due to a suspicious Elaine Pownall's interference.
14	4	"Oil and Water"	John Badham	Ian Sobel & Matt Morgan	February 14, 2019	0.52
The pack is unruly and as a result, they are split up among the trusted humans to learn about human ways and how to blend in. Ben is paired with Levi, while trying to keep him away from Xander. Helen reconnects with her relative Rick and reveals to him that merfolk have existed all along upon seeing Eliza. Xander traps an injured Katrina in the hold of his boat and interrogates her about Levi's whereabouts.
15	5	"Primal Instincts"	Ellen S. Pressman	Liz Maccie	February 21, 2019	0.50
Katrina teams up with Xander and recruits Cami and Levi to lead the merpeople back to water. Ryn learns more about love rules on land and meets Maddie's mother who deals with drug addiction. Her wedding ring is lost in the motel room occupied by Susan's drug dealer named Glen Jenkins. Maddie manages to bring it back by breaking into room but is stopped by Glen. They fight and Ryn comes to rescue Maddie, encounter ends by drug dealer being killed. Meanwhile Helen finds out more about her family.
16	6	"Distress Call"	David Grossman	Michael Gans & Richard Register	February 28, 2019	0.41
Maddie calls her father and Dale arrives to clean up the scene by imitating the accident. Later he learns from Susan that Glen was a big drug dealer called The Chemist and convinces Marissa that new murder is related to homicide of Donnie earlier connected with Ryn. Ben finds out Ted works with Oil Company. Meanwhile Katrina pushes conflict between merpeople and humans to a point where the war is close but compromise is found and united group is ready to drastic measures. Body of Sean McClure is accidentally discovered by fishers.
17	7	"Entrapment"	Amanda Row	Zoë Green	March 7, 2019	0.44
Dale returns to his post but faces troubles: at the autopsy of Sean McClure coroner detects signs of stab wound and case is handled by FBI now. Two agents arrive in Bristol Cove to question Ben, Xander, Calvin and Chris who also was brought in sheriff's station by force. Nicole reveals herself to Ryn as a Military officer and offers to help liberate Ben and his friends. Ryn makes a deal with her promises to help Military in return. Meanwhile Helen and tribe hide in mountains where they find cave paintings proving that humans and merpeople lived in peace and harmony long time ago.
18	8	"Leverage"	Joe Menendez	Eric Wald	March 14, 2019	0.51
Ben suggests to destroy drilling ship and tribe is ready to return to water. At parting Ryn spends night with him and Maddie. At the next day a celebration ceremony with live broadcast right from the sea bottom is held by town government and Oil Company. At the same time Ben and Maddie manage to turn off the sonic device giving merpeople an ability to go in the ocean and destroy the drilling rig. As a result ship collapses but Sarge is fatally wounded during the operation. Meanwhile Cami confronts Xander on board of the North Star causing the conflagration.
19	9	"No North Star"	Geoff Shotz	Sarah Wise	June 13, 2019	0.56
Ben and Maddie rescue Xander and Calvin but North Star is burnt and sunk. Xander is determined to start a new life and applies for the job as a bartender. Elaine Pownall's paralysis spreads making her bedridden. Ryn comes back and seeks to help her by continuing an involvement in Military experiments. Helen and Rick meet Beth Marzdan who is the sister of the last one. Unexpectedly their reunion leads to Helen and Rick being locked up in Beth's house.
20	10	"All In"	David Solomon	Heather Thomason	June 20, 2019	0.43
Elaine's paralysis expands faster and Ryn gives her consent to the extraction of stem cells. Mrs Pownall recovers but Ryn gets aggressive and emotionally unstable that leads to her runaway from Ben's house. Rick and Helen meet Bryan and learn that he and Beth are part of merpeople hybrids community and attend the gathering. There Helen gets acquainted with John and begins to suspect that there are some secrets amongst members. Xander finds out that Calvin gambles.
21	11	"Mixed Signals"	Ben Bray	Ian Sobel & Matt Morgan	June 27, 2019	0.39
Ben and Maddie pursue uncontrollable Ryn but lose track of her in the woods. They team up with Nicole and Xander and locate her but Maddie provokes Ryn into unconsciously singing a siren song to her. That puts Ryn back together again but Maddie seems to be affected. She and Ben decide to participate in researches of Military Company and doctor discovers some dark lesions in their brains. Elaine recovers and invites Ben, Maddie and Ryn to dinner but it goes in an unexpected way ending up with a surprising confession.
22	12	"Serenity"	Steven A. Adelson	Elias Benavidez	June 27, 2019	0.37
Maddie receives psychological evaluation and shows emotional crisis due to influence of siren song. Ryn seeks to help her and Ben and three of them dive deep in the ocean with the help of Nicole and US Navy forces to find an underwater healing echo cave. Levi comes back to land claiming here he can be free and make his own choices. Later he rescues Calvin from poker players he owed money to. Nicole and Xavier get close again. Meanwhile Helen finds out some grim facts about her parents.
23	13	"The Outpost"	Amanda Tapping	Cole Fowler	July 11, 2019	0.42
Its the start of mating season, Ryn tells Ben and Maddie about the lack of babies for the last generation or 2 and as a result their species is starting to dwindle. Ben and Maddie take Ryn to the military lab to run fertility tests and Ryn is proven to be healthy so Ben and Maddie think its related to the pollution of the Oceans. Beth finds out about Levi and persuades him to follow her to meet their group, while Helen sees this and given her distrust of her extended family takes Rick to find Beth and get Levi returned which with Ryn's help they are both allowed to return to the Ocean for mating season.
24	14	"The Last Mermaid"	Barbara Brown	Michael Gans & Richard Register	July 18, 2019	0.41
In the ocean, Ryn started mating with another merman because she couldn't find Levi. Due to the pollution, no mermaids can get pregnant so Ben and Maddie teach Ryn another way to reproduce. Meanwhile, Maddie gets suspicious on what the military has been doing while Helen finds out that the graveyard where Donna was buried in has been grave-robbed; including the decomposed remains of her late mother Daphne and Charles Pownall's half-human, half-mermaid daughter.
25	15	"Sacrifice"	Rachel Leiterman	Liz Maccie	July 25, 2019	0.53
Ben learns of Chris' connection with the government as the embryos in Ryn are fertilized. In order to help Ryn get them active, Ben and Maddie turn to the hybrids for help. Meanwhile, Ian gets suspicious of Ryn and secretly follows Ben, Maddie, and Ryn to where the hybrids are in order to get a breakthrough story.
26	16	"New World Order"	Nick Copus	Teleplay by : Emily Whitesell; Story by : Eric Wald	August 1, 2019	0.44
During a car chase, Ian's car crashes into the ocean. Ben dives in after Ian and Ryn. Ryn escapes, but Ian is trapped, leading Ben to free him. Later, Ian publicizes his footage of Ryn, forcing Ben and Maddie to escape. They hide Ryn months later, but the military apprehend Helen and the other hybrids. Xander and Calvin capture Cami. Maddie and Ryn hide in a cabin, but the military arrives with Ted and Sheriff Bishop. Ted tries to persuade Ben to give Ryn up; Ben takes him hostage. A sniper inadvertently shoots Maddie. Bishop tries to save Maddie, but she dies. But this was all a flashforward, a probable outcome of Ben rescuing Ian. Ben instead leaves Ian, later claiming to Maddie that he couldn't save him. The newspaper lists Ian's death as an accident. Helen is not sorry since due to his interference, Ryn's embryo could not be implanted. Ted's confusing memories from the old boat accident continue. Bishop tries to obtain the coast guard's incident report. Ryn's embryo is implanted into Meredith to give Bryan and Leela a merperson child. Ben is haunted by what he had to do to keep the secrets of the mermaids and the hybrids safe.

=== Season 3 (2020) ===
No. overall	No. in season	Title	Directed by	Written by	Original release date	U.S. viewers (millions)
27	1	"Borders"	Joe Menendez	Eric Wald	April 2, 2020	0.51
Maddie learns about what Ben did the night when Ian passed away, which she is not pleased about. Meanwhile, Ryn learns that the tyrannical mermaid Tia has come from the northern seas to Bristol Cove. She has plans to unite all the merpeople tribes under her rule in her plans to eradicate humanity for stealing her song all those years ago. Helen is disturbed and glad when her merman love Sarge appears to visit her.
28	2	"Revelations"	Nick Copus	Emily Whitesell	April 2, 2020	0.40
Ben finds Kyle's blood and parts of his uniform on the docks and is certain that Tia is responsible. On his training day, Xander glimpses Katrina nearby and warns Ben. Helen is intrigued by a dream she has had about her deceased merman love Sarge and just what he is trying to tell her. Tia reveals to Ryn that her song was taken from her when Russian scientists cut her brain. Katrina joins them in the warehouse, revealing that she is from Tia's colony but was separated as an infant and was found by Ryn's colony. Still disturbed by what had really happened with Elaine's accident a decade ago, Ted rashly goes to Carson Sound in a storm in hope to relive just what he had seen that night. Ben and Xander go after him in time to see Ted go into the sea of his free will with a flashlight. It is there that sees Tia who is about to kill him but he is saved by Ben as Ryn attacks Tia. A fight ensures, leaving Ryn badly hurt and for her niece Cami, Hunter, Katrina and healer Eliza to save her. Ted awakens and is very uneasy about the fact that he had indeed seen a mermaid before. At Helen's home, Helen asks Eliza what Sarge is trying to tell her, to which Eliza replies: "War is coming."
29	3	"Survivor"	Aprill Winney	Sarah Wise	April 9, 2020	0.42
Ryn heals harder so she decides to take combat practice on land and to learn to read to become strong enough to face Tia. Maddie and environmental activist Robb Wellens are getting closer. Elaine obtains new unexpected superpowers and is ready to continue her treatment even without commander Kyle's help. Desperate Ben seeking a way to help her digs up a corpse of an unidentified mermaid he buried some time ago and injects extracted stem cells into his veins to prove their effectiveness. Meanwhile Tia gains power over her tribe by defeating current leader and is determined to unite all merpeople through war. Helen visits the spirit world and encounters Donna. Ryn and Cami find out about Leena's prenancy with Ryn's embryo and come to her place which leads to Bryan being killed.
30	4	"Life and Death"	Joe Menendez	Michael Gans & Richard Register	April 16, 2020	0.37
Xander and Maddie deliver Bryan's dead body to the ranch for burial. Stem cells show efficiency by letting Ben heal faster. Meanwhile Calvin asks Xander to be his best man. Leena gives birth but dies just after the labor. Ryn gets her baby and goes back into the ocean to raise her infant daughter.
31	5	"Mommy and Me"	John Badham	Liz Maccie	April 23, 2020	0.42
Ryn comes back to Bristol Cove to teach her daughter survive both on land and in water but Levi and Mate show up and take baby to the ocean to manage her training by males according to the rules of merpeople. At parting Ryn names her child Hope. Ben continues injecting himself and as a result gets new abilities. Meanwhile Ryn is forced to return in water to fight Tia who struck Ryn's pack.
32	6	"The Island"	Amanda Row	Cole Fowler	April 30, 2020	0.34
After being informed of Tia's attack by Cami, Ryn accompanies her niece into the ocean where they find Hunter and the other mermaid refuges on an island recuperating from their wounds. Ryn plans to get Ben to help rescue them before Tia and her followers show up. Due to the stem cells of the partially transformed dead mermaid inside his system, Ben is capable of holding his own against them, having gained powerful superhuman abilities; namely enhanced strength, agility, reflexes, hearing and regenerative healing. Ryn tries to get Katrina to return but she refuses and slits her own throat. Hunter survives but is found by Tia and her troops. Desperate to save herself, Hunter informs Tia of Ryn's infant daughter being trained by her father and Levi elsewhere. Tia plans to use this to her advantage. Maddie introduces Robb to Ryn who attacks him, sensing that he is a merman.
33	7	"Northern Exposure"	Marita Grabiak	Gavin Johannsen	May 7, 2020	0.41
With Maddie now knowing that Robb is a merman, he does state that they can get some allies to help fight Tia in Nome, Alaska, where his colony lives. When Robb is unable to win their leader Yura over, he, Ben, Ryn, and Maddie work by removing the pollutants from the special pool that enables a mermaid to become a merman for reproductive purposes. Meanwhile, Tia begins the next plot of her attack by making use of some explosives.
34	8	"Til Death Do Us Part"	Bola Ogun	Heather Thomason	May 14, 2020	0.42
Ben, Maddie and Ryn get an ultrasound cannon from the bottom of the ocean to use it against Tia. After staying underwater for quite a while Ben starts to transform into a merman. He and Ryn choose to spend their lives on land as humans and get rid of stem cells due to their unpredictable effects. Xander takes Chris from Military base and manages to grab Donna's remains for burial so her soul would find peace. Calvin and Janine get married. At the wedding Ryn realizes earth isn't her home and decides to go back to water. Meanwhile Tia gets access to the weapon which was designed based on her song. Xander picks up his phone and passes out.
35	9	"A Voice in the Dark"	Steven A. Adelson	Zoë Green	May 21, 2020	0.43
Xander is in the hospital after hearing a copy of the siren song. As the doctors work to heal Xander, Ryn is reunited with Hope who is now a little girl due to how merpeople children develop as she gets her acquainted with the land life and the hybrids. Continuing her phone-based broadcast of the siren song on Bristol Cove and the neighboring counties, Tia sends Hunter to claim Hope for her group.
36	10	"The Toll of the Sea"	Joe Menendez	Eric Wald & Emily Whitesell	May 28, 2020	0.50
With more and more people being inflected by Tia's song, it is up to Helen and her fellow hybrids to restore order by turning to Ted Pownall, who is having difficulty accepting his youngest son's transformation. As Tia attempts to convince young Hope to join her in wiping out humanity, Ryn and Ben head off to find her with aid from the military. Maddie asks Robb that he reclaim the same sound waves from the echo chamber of his colony to neutralize the song's agonizing affects. The cure is successful as Xander is the first to recover. He goes to help Maddie in finding her stepfather, but are too late as the song has killed him. Meanwhile, in the depths of the sea, Hope is imprisoned in the crashed airplane as bait to lure Ryn to Tia. On land, the spirit of Donna appears before her daughter Cami and warns her and the others of Ryn's predicament. Cami, Vivian, Levi, Eliza and Ryn's mate ask to use Calvin's motorboat for a sneak attack on the enemy. Ryn is ready to face the rogue mermaid while Ben goes to save Hope with his newfound water-breathing abilities from the stems cells he has been injecting himself with. He succeeds and tells Hope to go to the surface where it is safe. Tia's army has greatly outnumbered Ryn and her remaining colony, but the tide is quickly turned in their favor when Robb's colony arrive with the male Yura in the lead. Ryn ferociously battles Tia and kills her with her spear, thus ending her scourge. All of Ryn's colony, including Robb and Yura, bow down to her in reverence as she is now alpha of all merpeople colonies of the ocean. One week later, the attack is considered to have been from the Russians by the locals. Ted is worried about Ben's sudden absence. Xander becomes the new sheriff of Bristol Cove in place of Dale's tragic death. Maddie decides to travel with Robb to work on the ocean-cleaning project he has started on in order to try and move on from losing her stepfather. She tries to get Ryn to let go of Ben, as all have presumed him dead, but Ryn is certain he will return someday. Atop a rock in the sea, Ryn waits for Ben, who is revealed to be underwater still to parts unknown. However, the shared dream of living together with Hope as a loving family refuses to die.

== Production ==
=== Development ===
On July 25, 2016, Freeform orders a pilot titled The Deep, based on a story by Eric Wald and Dean White, who will serve as executive producers on the pilot, Wald wrote the script. Scott Stewart will direct the pilot, and Emily Whitesell will serve as the showrunner. On April 19, 2017, the series was officially picked up with the current title for broadcast in the summer of 2018. On October 7, 2017, it was announced that the series would be released on March 29, 2018, in a two-hour event. On May 15, 2018, the series was renewed for a 16-episode second season which premiered on January 24, 2019. On May 14, 2019, the series was renewed for a third season which premiered on April 2, 2020. On August 5, 2020, Freeform canceled the series after three seasons.

=== Casting ===
On August 24, 2016, Eline Powell joined the cast in the role of Po (renamed Ryn) and Rena Owen as Helen. On September 26, 2016, Ian Verdun joined the cast in the role of Xander, followed by a few days of Alex Roe and Fola Evans-Akingbola in the roles of Ben and Maddie, respectively. Chad Rook announced on May 16, 2017, via Twitter that he will be in the series playing Chris Mueller. On July 26, 2017, it was announced that Sibongile Mlambo joined the cast as regular as Donna. On August 14, 2019, Tiffany Lonsdale was cast as a new series regular for the third season.

=== Music ===
Michael A. Levine is the former composer of Siren's score. The haunting and seductive Siren Call was written and composed by Levine and performed by singer/songwriter Mariana Barreto. Throughout the composition cycle, Levine incorporated the sounds of the tenor violin, octave viola (ciola), and the gusli. A soundtrack release date has yet to be announced by Freeform.

=== Filming ===
The pilot was filmed in October 2016, in Vancouver British Columbia, Canada. Pre-production started on July 26, 2017. The official shooting of the remaining episodes began on August 4, 2017, and continued until November 22, 2017. Filming for season 3 began on August 1, 2019, and ended on December 16, 2019.

=== Marketing ===
The trailer was released on April 19, 2017, the same day it was picked up. The first episode was shown at the New York Comic Con in October 2017.

== Broadcast ==
In the United Kingdom, the first season premiered on SyFy on May 3, 2018. The following year, the second season premiered on February 14, 2019.

== Reception ==
=== Critical response ===
On the review aggregator website Rotten Tomatoes, the first season holds an approval rating of 95% based on 20 reviews, with an average rating of 8.0/10. The website's critical consensus reads, "Siren turns traditional lore on its tail with a unique, well-paced show that presents dangerous, violent mythical creatures in a surprisingly empathetic and exciting light."

=== Ratings ===
==== Season 1 ====
Viewership and ratings per episode of Siren
No.	Title	Air date	Rating (18–49)	Viewers (millions)	DVR (18–49)	DVR viewers (millions)	Total (18–49)	Total viewers (millions)
1	"Pilot"	March 29, 2018	0.3	0.87	0.3	0.83	0.6	1.70
2	"The Lure"	March 29, 2018	0.3	0.87	0.3	0.77	0.6	1.64
3	"Interview With a Mermaid"	April 5, 2018	0.2	0.62	0.3	0.64	0.5	1.26
4	"On the Road"	April 12, 2018	0.3	0.68	0.3	0.78	0.6	1.46
5	"Curse of the Starving Class"	April 19, 2018	0.3	0.69	—N/a	—N/a	—N/a	—N/a
6	"Showdown"	April 26, 2018	0.2	0.59	0.3	0.85	0.5	1.44
7	"Dead in the Water"	May 3, 2018	0.2	0.51	—N/a	—N/a	—N/a	—N/a
8	"Being Human"	May 10, 2018	0.2	0.50	0.2	0.68	0.4	1.17
9	"Street Fight"	May 17, 2018	0.2	0.62	—N/a	—N/a	—N/a	—N/a
10	"Aftermath"	May 24, 2018	0.2	0.66	0.3	0.69	0.5	1.34

==== Season 2 ====
Viewership and ratings per episode of Siren
No.	Title	Air date	Rating (18–49)	Viewers (millions)	DVR (18–49)	DVR viewers (millions)	Total (18–49)	Total viewers (millions)
1	"The Arrival"	January 24, 2019	0.2	0.71	0.3	—N/a	0.5	—N/a
2	"The Wolf at the Door"	January 31, 2019	0.2	0.53	—N/a	0.59	—N/a	1.12
3	"Natural Order"	February 7, 2019	0.1	0.42	—N/a	—N/a	—N/a	—N/a
4	"Oil and Water"	February 14, 2019	0.2	0.52	—N/a	0.48	—N/a	1.00
5	"Primal Instincts"	February 21, 2019	0.2	0.50	—N/a	0.66	—N/a	1.16
6	"Distress Call"	February 28, 2019	0.1	0.41	0.2	0.45	0.3	0.86
7	"Entrapment"	March 7, 2019	0.2	0.44	—N/a	0.44	—N/a	0.88
8	"Leverage"	March 14, 2019	0.2	0.51	—N/a	—N/a	—N/a	—N/a
9	"No North Star"	June 13, 2019	0.2	0.56	—N/a	—N/a	—N/a	—N/a
10	"All In"	June 20, 2019	0.1	0.43	0.2	0.40	0.3	0.83
11	"Mixed Signals"	June 27, 2019	0.1	0.39	—N/a	0.35	—N/a	0.74
12	"Serenity"	June 27, 2019	0.1	0.37	—N/a	0.39	—N/a	0.76
13	"The Outpost"	July 11, 2019	0.1	0.42	—N/a	0.43	—N/a	0.84
14	"The Last Mermaid"	July 18, 2019	0.1	0.41	—N/a	0.36	—N/a	0.77
15	"Sacrifice"	July 25, 2019	0.2	0.53	—N/a	—N/a	—N/a	—N/a
16	"New World Order"	August 1, 2019	0.1	0.44	—N/a	—N/a	—N/a	—N/a

==== Season 3 ====
Viewership and ratings per episode of Siren
No.	Title	Air date	Rating (18–49)	Viewers (millions)	DVR (18–49)	DVR viewers (millions)	Total (18–49)	Total viewers (millions)
1	"Borders"	April 2, 2020	0.2	0.51	—N/a	0.31	—N/a	0.82
2	"Revelations"	April 2, 2020	0.1	0.40	0.1	0.29	0.2	0.69
3	"Survivor"	April 9, 2020	0.1	0.42	0.1	0.34	0.2	0.76
4	"Life and Death"	April 16, 2020	0.1	0.37	0.1	0.36	0.2	0.73
5	"Mommy and Me"	April 23, 2020	0.1	0.42	0.1	0.36	0.2	0.79
6	"The Island"	April 30, 2020	0.1	0.34	0.1	0.37	0.2	0.71
7	"Northern Exposure"	May 7, 2020	0.1	0.41	0.1	0.31	0.2	0.71
8	"Til Death Do Us Part"	May 14, 2020	0.1	0.42	0.1	0.27	0.2	0.68
9	"A Voice in the Dark"	May 21, 2020	0.1	0.43	0.1	0.28	0.2	0.71
10	"The Toll of the Sea"	May 28, 2020	0.1	0.37	0.1	0.30	0.2	0.66

=== Accolades ===
Year	Award	Category	Nominee(s)	Result	Ref.
2018	Teen Choice Awards	Choice Breakout TV Show	Siren	Nominated	
2019	The CAFTCAD Awards	Best Costume Design in TV Contemporary	Lorraine Carson, Mary Kimmel, Tammy Joe, Rachel Guegen, Kathy Linder, Aja Robb	Nominated	
2019	The Joey Awards	Best Featured Actor in a Television Series	Nikolas Dukic	Won	
2019	Leo Awards	Best Overall Sound in a Dramatic Series	Kelly Cole, Gregorio Gomez, Adam Sharpe, Miguel Araujo, Jay Cheetham, May Guimaraes, Kevin Belen, Kevin Morales	Nominated	
2019	Leo Awards	Best Direction in a Dramatic Series	Steven A. Adelson	Nominated	
2020	The Joey Awards	Best Actress in a Recurring Television Role 6–8 years	Alix West Lefler	Won	
2021	Leo Awards	Best Overall Sound in a Dramatic Series	Tony Gort, Greg Stewart, Angelo Nicoloyannis, Roger Morris, Rick Senechal, Bonnie Lambie, Shawn Miller	Won	

== See also ==
- The Lure, a Polish musical horror film with a similar plot.
- H_{2}O: Just Add Water
- Mako: Island of Secrets
- Naagin
