= List of accolades received by Zootopia 2 =

Zootopia 2 accolades
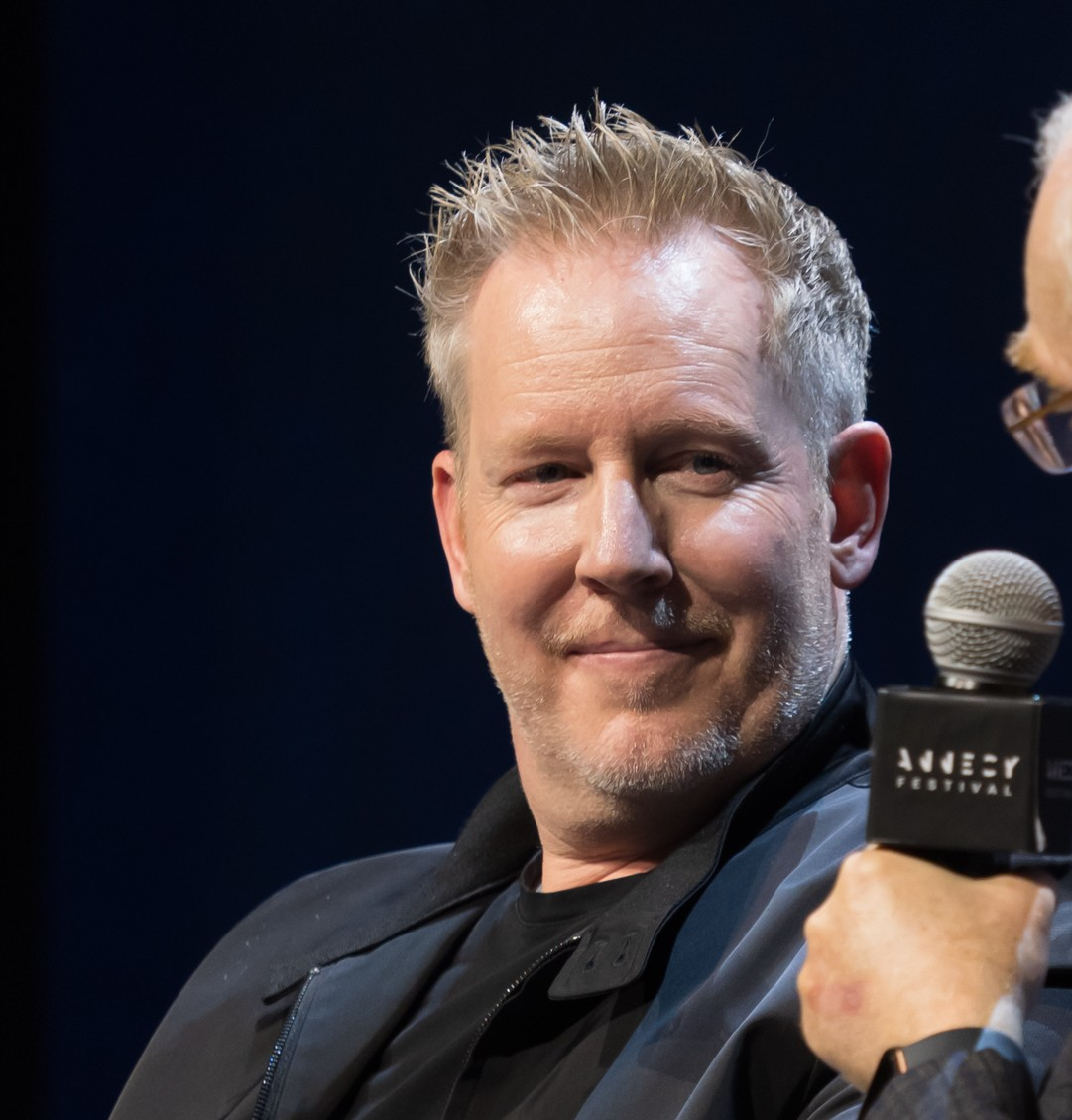
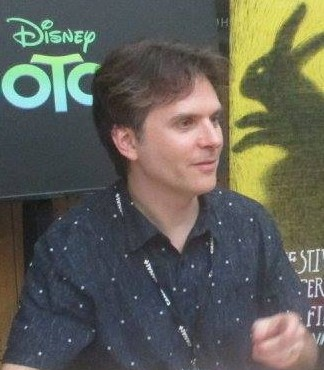
- L–R: Director Jared Bush and Byron Howard received numerous accolades for their direction.
Awards and nominations
Award	Wins	Nominations
Academy Awards	0	1
American Cinema Editors Awards	0	1
Annie Awards	0	7
ADG Excellence in Production Design Awards	0	1
Artios Awards	1	1
Astra Film Awards	0	2
Austin Film Critics Association	0	1
Black Reel Awards	0	2
Blue Ribbon Awards	0	1
British Academy Film Awards	1	2
Chicago Film Critics Association	0	1
Cinema Audio Society Awards	0	1
Critics' Choice Awards	0	1
Dorian Awards	0	1
EDA Awards	0	3
Georgia Film Critics Association	0	1
Golden Globe Awards	0	2
Golden Reel Awards	1	1
Golden Tomato Awards	1	2
Golden Trailer Awards	0	3
Heartland International Film Festival	1	1
Hollywood Music in Media Awards	0	1
Houston Film Critics Society	0	1
International Cinephile Society	0	1
International Film Music Critics Association Awards	1	1
Jupiter Award	1	1
Kansas City Film Critics Circle	0	1
Kids' Choice Awards	2	5
Las Vegas Film Critics Society	1	2
London Film Critics' Circle	0	1
Lumiere Awards	1	1
Movieguide Awards	0	1
Music Awards Japan	0	2
NAACP Image Awards	2	2
New York Film Critics Online	1	1
Online Film Critics Society	0	1
Phoenix Film Critics Society	1	1
Producers Guild of America Awards	0	1
San Francisco Bay Area Film Critics Circle Awards	0	1
Satellite Awards	0	1
Saturn Awards	1	1
Society of Composers & Lyricists	0	1
Southeastern Film Critics Association	1	1
St. Louis Film Critics Association	1	2
Visual Effects Society Awards	1	5
Washington D.C. Area Film Critics Association Awards	0	4
Weibo Awards	1	1
Women Film Critics Circle	1	1

Totals (Note: Certain award groups do not simply award one winner. They acknowledge several different recipients, have runners-up, and have third place. Since this is a specific recognition and is different from losing an award, runner-up mentions are considered wins in this award tally. For simplification and to avoid errors, each award in this list has been presumed to have had a prior nomination.)
- Wins: 22
- Nominations: 80

Zootopia 2 (titled Zootropolis 2 among other titles in some markets) (Note: As explained in Zootopia § Alternative titles, this is due to Disney being unable to trademark the name "Zootopia" in some territories.) is a 2025 American animated buddy cop comedy film produced by Walt Disney Animation Studios and the sequel to Zootopia (2016). Directed by Jared Bush and Byron Howard and written by Bush, the film stars Ginnifer Goodwin, Jason Bateman, Shakira, Idris Elba, Alan Tudyk, Nate Torrence, Don Lake, Bonnie Hunt, and Jenny Slate reprising their roles from the first film, with Ke Huy Quan, Fortune Feimster, Andy Samberg, David Strathairn, Patrick Warburton, Quinta Brunson, and Danny Trejo joining the cast. The film follows Judy Hopps and Nick Wilde as they pursue a pit viper named Gary De'Snake across Zootopia and try to clear their names after being framed.

The film had premiered at the El Capitan Theatre in Hollywood, Los Angeles on November 13, 2025, and was released in the United States by Walt Disney Studios Motion Pictures on November 26, 2025.

Zootopia 2 garnered awards and nominations at many ceremonies, with recognition for its direction, animation, and voice performances. At the 31st Critics' Choice Awards, it was nominated for Best Animated Feature. It is also nominated for two awards at the 83rd Golden Globe Awards, Best Motion Picture – Animated and Cinematic and Box Office Achievement. The film was also nominated for seven awards at the 53rd Annie Awards, including Best Feature and Best Writing – Feature for Jared Bush. At the 98th Academy Awards, the film was nominated for Best Animated Feature. It is also nominated for two British Academy Film Awards winning Best Animated Film.

== Accolades ==
Award	Date of ceremony	Category	Recipient	Result	Ref.
Academy Awards	March 15, 2026	Best Animated Feature	Jared Bush and Byron Howard (directors); Yvett Merino (producer)	Nominated	
American Cinema Editors Awards	February 27, 2026	Best Edited Animated Feature Film (Theatrical or Non-Theatrical)	Jeremy Milton	Nominated	
Annie Awards	February 21, 2026	Best Feature	Zootopia 2	Nominated	
Annie Awards	February 21, 2026	Best FX – Feature	Le Joyce Tong, Shamintha Kalamba Arachchi, Dimitre Berberov, Chris Carignan, and Cristiana Covone	Nominated	
Annie Awards	February 21, 2026	Best Character Animation – Feature	Tony Smeed	Nominated	
Annie Awards	February 21, 2026	Best Music – Feature	Shakira, Ed Sheeran, Blake Slatkin, and Michael Giacchino	Nominated	
Annie Awards	February 21, 2026	Best Production Design – Feature	Cory Loftis and Limei Z. Hshieh	Nominated	
Annie Awards	February 21, 2026	Best Storyboarding – Feature	Hikari Toriumi	Nominated	
Annie Awards	February 21, 2026	Best Writing – Feature	Jared Bush	Nominated	
ADG Excellence in Production Design Awards	February 28, 2026	Excellence in Production Design for an Animated Film	Cory Loftis	Nominated	
Artios Awards	February 26, 2026	Outstanding Achievement in Casting – Feature (Animation)	Grace C. Kim	Won	
Astra Film Awards	January 9, 2026	Best Animated Feature	Zootopia 2	Nominated	
Astra Film Awards	January 9, 2026	Best Voice Over Performance	Shakira	Nominated	
Austin Film Critics Association	December 18, 2025	Best Animated Film	Zootopia 2	Nominated	
Blue Ribbon Awards	February 17, 2026	Best Foreign Film	Jared Bush and Byron Howard	Nominated	
Black Reel Awards	February 16, 2026	Outstanding Voice Performance	Quinta Brunson	Nominated	
Black Reel Awards	February 16, 2026	Outstanding Voice Performance	Idris Elba	Nominated	
British Academy Film Awards	February 22, 2026	Best Animated Film	Jared Bush and Byron Howard (directors); Yvett Merino (producer)	Won	
British Academy Film Awards	February 22, 2026	Best Children's & Family Film	Jared Bush and Byron Howard (directors); Yvett Merino (producer)	Nominated	
Chicago Film Critics Association	December 11, 2025	Best Animated Feature	Zootopia 2	Nominated	
Cinema Audio Society Awards	March 7, 2026	Outstanding Achievement in Sound Mixing for a Motion Picture – Animated	Gabriel Guy (original dialogue mixer and re-recording mixer); David Fluhr (re-recording mixer); Warren Brown (scoring mixer); Doc Kane (ADR mixer); Richard Duarte (foley mixer)	Nominated	
Critics' Choice Awards	January 4, 2026	Best Animated Feature	Zootopia 2	Nominated	
Dorian Awards	March 6, 2026	Animated Film of the Year	Zootopia 2	Nominated	
EDA Awards	December 31, 2025	Best Animated Feature	Zootopia 2	Nominated	
EDA Awards	December 31, 2025	EDA Female Focus – Best Voiced Performance in Animated Feature	Ginnifer Goodwin	Nominated	
EDA Awards	December 31, 2025	EDA Female Focus – Best Voiced Performance in Animated Feature	Fortune Feimster	Nominated	
Georgia Film Critics Association	December 27, 2025	Best Animated Film	Zootopia 2	Nominated	
Golden Globes Awards	January 11, 2026	Best Motion Picture – Animated	Zootopia 2	Nominated	
Golden Globes Awards	January 11, 2026	Cinematic and Box Office Achievement	Zootopia 2	Nominated	
Golden Reel Awards	March 8, 2026	Outstanding Achievement in Sound Editing – Feature Animation	Jeremy Bowker (supervising sound editor and sound designer); Brad Semenoff (supervising dialogue editor); Stephen M. Davis and Earl Ghaffari (supervising music editors); Luke Dunn Gielmuda, Joel Raabe, Kimberly Patrick, and Cameron Barker (sound effects editors); Jacob Riehle and Angela Ang (dialogue editors); Kendall Demarest (senior music editor); Jordan Myers (foley editor); Ronni Brown and Sean England (foley artists)	Won	
Golden Tomato Awards	January 13, 2026	Best Animated Movies	Zootopia 2	Won	
Golden Tomato Awards	January 13, 2026	Fan-Favorite Animated Movie	Zootopia 2	Nominated	
Golden Trailer Awards	May 28, 2026	Best Animation / Family	"Make It" (Walt Disney Studios and MOCEAN)	Nominated	
Golden Trailer Awards	May 28, 2026	Best Digital – Animation / Family	"Breaking News" (The Walt Disney Company and Tiny Hero)	Nominated	
Golden Trailer Awards	May 28, 2026	Best Animation TrailerByte for a Feature Film	Digital Spots (The Walt Disney Company and Tiny Hero)	Nominated	
Heartland International Film Festival	December 5, 2025	Truly Moving Picture Award	Zootopia 2	Won	
Hollywood Music in Media Awards	November 19, 2025	Original Song – Animated Film	"Zoo" – Ed Sheeran, Blake Slatkin, and Shakira (songwriters); Shakira (performer)	Nominated	
Houston Film Critics Society	January 20, 2026	Best Animated Feature	Zootopia 2	Nominated	
International Cinephile Society	February 8, 2026	Best Animated Film	Zootopia 2	Nominated	
International Film Music Critics Association Awards	February 26, 2026	Best Original Score for an Animated Film	Michael Giacchino	Won	
Jupiter Award	March 19, 2026	Bes International Film	Zootopia 2	Won	
Kansas City Film Critics Circle	December 21, 2025	Best Animated Feature	Zootopia 2	Nominated	
Kids' Choice Awards	November 14, 2026	Favorite Animated Movie	Zootopia 2	Won	
Kids' Choice Awards	November 14, 2026	Favorite Female Animated Voice from a Movie	Ginnifer Goodwin	Nominated	
Kids' Choice Awards	November 14, 2026	Favorite Male Animated Voice from a Movie	Jason Bateman	Nominated	
Kids' Choice Awards	November 14, 2026	Favorite On-Screen Duo or Trio	Ginnifer Goodwin and Jason Bateman	Won	
Kids' Choice Awards	November 14, 2026	Favorite Song from A Movie	"Zoo" – Shakira	Nominated	
Las Vegas Film Critics Society	December 19, 2025	Best Animated Film	Zootopia 2	Won	
Las Vegas Film Critics Society	December 19, 2025	Best Family Film	Zootopia 2	Nominated	
London Film Critics Circle	February 1, 2026	Animated Film of the Year	Zootopia 2	Nominated	
Lumiere Awards	February 9, 2026	Best Feature Film – Animation	Zootopia 2	Won	
Movieguide Awards	March 5, 2026	Best Movie for Children	Zootopia 2	Nominated	
Music Awards Japan	June 13, 2026	Best International Pop Song in Japan	"Zoo" – Shakira	Nominated	
Music Awards Japan	June 13, 2026	Best of Listeners' Choice: International Song	"Zoo" – Shakira	Nominated	
NAACP Image Awards	February 28, 2026	Outstanding Animated Motion Picture	Zootopia 2	Won	
NAACP Image Awards	February 28, 2026	Outstanding Character Voice Performance – Motion Picture	Quinta Brunson	Won	
New York Film Critics Online	December 15, 2025	Best Animated Feature	Zootopia 2	Runner-up (Note: Runner-Up tied with Little Amélie or the Character of Rain)	
Online Film Critics Society	January 26, 2026	Best Animated Feature	Zootopia 2	Nominated	
Phoenix Film Critics Society	December 15, 2025	Best Animated Film	Zootopia 2	Won	
Producers Guild of America Awards	February 28, 2026	Outstanding Producer of Animated Theatrical Motion Pictures	Yvett Merino	Nominated	
San Diego Film Critics Society	December 15, 2025	Best Animated Film	Zootopia 2	Nominated	
San Francisco Bay Area Film Critics Circle	December 14, 2025	Best Animated Feature	Zootopia 2	Runner-up	
Satellite Awards	March 10, 2026	Best Motion Picture – Animated or Mixed Media	Zootopia 2	Nominated	
Saturn Awards	March 8, 2026	Best Animated Film	Zootopia 2	Won	
Seattle Film Critics Society	December 15, 2025	Best Animated Feature	Zootopia 2	Nominated	
Society of Composers & Lyricists	February 6, 2026	Outstanding Original Song for a Comedy or Musical Visual Media Production	"Zoo" – Ed Sheeran, Blake Slatkin, and Shakira	Nominated	
Southeastern Film Critics Association	December 15, 2025	Best Animated Film	Zootopia 2	Runner-up	
St. Louis Film Critics Association	December 14, 2025	Best Animated Film	Zootopia 2	Won	
St. Louis Film Critics Association	December 14, 2025	Best Vocal Performance	Ginnifer Goodwin	Nominated	
Visual Effects Society Awards	February 25, 2026	Outstanding Animation in an Animated Feature	Gregory Smith, Laurie Au, Marlon West, and Shweta Viswanathan	Nominated	
Visual Effects Society Awards	February 25, 2026	Outstanding Character in an Animated Feature	Adam Green, Jennifer Stratton, Christoffer Pedersen, and Jesse Erickson (for "Gary De'Snake")	Nominated	
Visual Effects Society Awards	February 25, 2026	Outstanding Environment in an Animated Feature	Limei Z. Hshieh, Alexander Nicholas Whang, Joshua Fry, and Ryan DeYoung (for "Marsh Market")	Won	
Visual Effects Society Awards	February 25, 2026	Outstanding Effects Simulations in an Animated Feature	Sujil Sukumaran, Stuart Griese, Zoran Stojanoski, and Paul Carman	Nominated	
Visual Effects Society Awards	February 25, 2026	Outstanding CG Cinematography	Tyler Kupferer, Daniel Rice, and Griselda Sastrawinata-Lemay	Nominated	
Washington D.C. Area Film Critics Association	December 7, 2025	Best Animated Feature	Zootopia 2	Nominated	
Washington D.C. Area Film Critics Association	December 7, 2025	Best Voice Performance	Jason Bateman	Nominated	
Washington D.C. Area Film Critics Association	December 7, 2025	Best Voice Performance	Ginnifer Goodwin	Nominated	
Washington D.C. Area Film Critics Association	December 7, 2025	Best Voice Performance	Ke Huy Quan	Nominated	
Weibo Awards	February 5, 2026	Film of the Year	Zootopia 2	Won	
Women Film Critics Circle	December 21, 2025	Best Animated Female	Judy Hopps	Runner-up (Note: Tied with Amélie from Little Amélie or the Character of Rain)	

== See also ==
- List of submissions for the Academy Award for Best Animated Feature
- Lists of animated films
- List of animation awards
- List of animated feature films nominated for Academy Awards
- List of Academy Award–nominated films
