= Zootopia 2 =

2025 film by Jared Bush and Byron Howard

- Theatrical release poster
- Directed by: Jared Bush; Byron Howard
- Written by: Jared Bush
- Produced by: Yvett Merino
- Starring: Ginnifer Goodwin; Jason Bateman; Ke Huy Quan; Fortune Feimster; Andy Samberg; David Strathairn; Shakira; Idris Elba; Patrick Warburton; Quinta Brunson; Danny Trejo; Alan Tudyk; Nate Torrence; Don Lake; Bonnie Hunt; Jenny Slate
- Cinematography: Tyler Kupferer (layout); Daniel Rice (lighting)
- Edited by: Jeremy Milton
- Music by: Michael Giacchino
- Production company: Walt Disney Animation Studios
- Distributed by: Walt Disney Studios; Motion Pictures (Note: Distributed under the Walt Disney Pictures banner)
- Release dates: November 13, 2025 (El Capitan Theatre); November 26, 2025 (United States)
- Running time: 108 minutes
- Country: United States
- Language: English
- Budget: $150 million
- Box office: $1.87 billion

Zootopia 2 (titled Zootropolis 2 in some markets) (Note: As explained in Zootopia § Alternative titles, this is due to Disney being unable to trademark the name "Zootopia" in some territories.) is a 2025 American animated buddy cop film directed by Jared Bush and Byron Howard and written by Bush. Produced by Walt Disney Animation Studios, it is the sequel to Zootopia (2016) and stars Ginnifer Goodwin, Jason Bateman, Shakira, Idris Elba, Alan Tudyk, Nate Torrence, Don Lake, Bonnie Hunt and Jenny Slate reprising their roles from the first film, with Ke Huy Quan, Fortune Feimster, Andy Samberg, David Strathairn, Patrick Warburton, Quinta Brunson, Macaulay Culkin, Brenda Song, and Danny Trejo joining the cast. The film follows Judy Hopps and Nick Wilde as they pursue a pit viper named Gary De'Snake across Zootopia and try to clear their names after being framed.

Zootopia 2 premiered at El Capitan Theatre in Hollywood, Los Angeles on November 13, 2025, and was released in the United States on November 26. The film received positive reviews from critics and grossed $1.87 billion worldwide, becoming the second-highest-grossing animated film of all time, the ninth-highest-grossing film of all time at the time of its release, and the second-highest-grossing film of 2025. It won Best Animated Feature at the 79th British Academy Film Awards and was nominated in the same category at the 83rd Golden Globe Awards (in addition to Cinematic and Box Office Achievement), the 31st Critics' Choice Awards and the 98th Academy Awards, among numerous other accolades. A sequel is in development.

== Plot ==
A week after Judy Hopps and Nick Wilde become partners in the Zootopia Police Department (ZPD), (Note: As depicted in Zootopia (2016)) their clashing personalities start to complicate their work. Chief Bogo threatens to separate them unless they resolve their differences. During a raid on a smuggling ring, Judy finds a piece of snake skin, although snakes have not been seen in Zootopia for a century. Undeterred, she suspects that a snake may appear at the Zootennial Gala, an event hosted by Milton Lynxley, whose grandfather Ebenezer founded Zootopia, to celebrate its centennial anniversary.

While infiltrating the Gala with Nick, Judy befriends Pawbert, the youngest son and black sheep of the Lynxley family. Meanwhile, a hooded creature crashes the party and reveals himself as a pit viper. He kidnaps Milton and uses his eye to unlock a digitally locked glass case containing an old journal that documents the creation of the weather walls that regulate Zootopia's climate zones.

Judy corners the viper, who confesses the journal contains evidence to exonerate his family. Seeking to preserve his family's reputation, Milton demands to have the journal burned and the viper killed, but Judy refuses, setting the room ablaze. When ZPD Captain Hoggbottom arrives after the viper accidentally bites Bogo, the Lynxleys frame Judy and Nick for the crime, forcing them to escape with the journal whilst an unknown motorcyclist retrieves the viper. Afterwards, Milton orders former actor and newly elected Mayor Brian Winddancer, whom Milton secretly controls, to retrieve the journal and apprehend Judy, Nick, and the viper.

Now fugitives, Judy and Nick meet Nibbles Maplestick, a conspiracy theorist beaver who leads them to Marsh Market, a secluded area of Zootopia where reptiles hide. There, a basilisk named Jesús explains that the reptiles' original district was buried during the construction of Zootopia's arctic district, Tundratown, which is expected to expand to Marsh Market. The ZPD, led by Hoggbottom, finds Judy and Nick, who narrowly escape, but the viper reappears, retrieves the journal, and escapes through a water tunnel. As they attempt to locate the viper, Judy and Nick climb to reach an abandoned lodge, leading to an argument that ends with their shared carrot pen breaking.

Inside, Judy discovers that reptiles once lived peacefully in Zootopia. The ZPD finds them and arrests Nick, but the viper, who introduces himself as Gary De'Snake, and his motorcyclist partner, revealed to be Pawbert, rescue Judy, explaining that Gary's great-grandmother Agnes was not only the original author of the journal, but also the true founder of Zootopia. Her greedy investor Ebenezer plagiarized her engineering work on the weather walls and later framed her for murdering his tortoise maid, who tried to stop him from burning the original patent. The maid's death subsequently turned the general populace against reptiles, eventually leading to their exile from Zootopia.

Aided by Nibbles, whom the ZPD also arrested, Nick escapes from prison, while accidentally releasing many prisoners, and locates Judy at the Desert-Tundratown weather wall, where she, Gary, and Pawbert activate an old clock tower to find the buried reptile district, deducing that the patent is hidden in Agnes' house. However, Pawbert injects Judy with snake venom, throws Gary out in the snow, and steals the antivenom, revealing he intends to destroy the patent and earn his family's respect and approval. Arriving at the wall, Nick fights Pawbert for the antivenom and manages to throw it to Gary, who cures Judy. After emotionally reconciling with each other, Judy and Nick, accompanied by Gary and Nibbles, follow Pawbert to Lynxley Manor, where they subdue him while Winddancer takes out Milton and his other children. They then find both Agnes' house and the patent, but Pawbert reappears and attempts to destroy it, before being knocked out by Hoggbottom.

With their crimes exposed, the Lynxleys are arrested and Agnes is credited as Zootopia's true founder. Judy and Nick are exonerated, Bogo recovers, the Tundratown expansion to Marsh Market is scrapped and Reptile Ravine is thawed, allowing for reptiles to be fully reintegrated back into Zootopia. Gary reunites with his family, and Nick gifts Judy the newly repaired carrot pen before they begin tracking down the escaped convicts Nick accidentally released earlier, starting with Dawn Bellwether.

== Voice cast ==
- Ginnifer Goodwin as Judy Hopps, a young optimistic rabbit and the first rabbit officer of the Zootopia Police Department (ZPD)
- Jason Bateman as Nick Wilde, a sly red fox and a former con artist who later joined the Zootopia Police Department as their first fox officer
- Ke Huy Quan as Gary De'Snake, a pit viper being pursued by Judy and Nick
- Fortune Feimster as Nibbles Maplestick, a beaver podcast host and conspiracy theorist
- Andy Samberg as Pawbert Lynxley, an awkward Canada lynx who is the youngest son of the powerful Lynxley family where he is considered the runt
- David Strathairn as Milton Lynxley, Pawbert, Cattrick and Kitty's father and the ruthless and cruel oligarch patriarch of the Lynxley family
- Idris Elba as Chief Bogo, the African buffalo chief of police of the Zootopia Police Department
- Shakira as Gazelle, (Note: @Walt Disney Animation Studios; (November 8, 2024). Disney Animation Studios/p/DCH6bFDhU2Q/ "Just announced at #D23Brasil" – via Instagram.) a Thomson's gazelle who is a famous pop music star
- Patrick Warburton as Brian Winddancer, a Clydesdale horse who is a former action hero actor and the current Mayor of Zootopia who officially succeeds Leodore Lionheart
- Quinta Brunson as Dr. Fuzzby, a quokka psychotherapist of partners' therapy at the ZPD
- Danny Trejo as Jesús, a plumed basilisk who is a member of a hidden reptilian community at Marsh Market
- Nate Torrence as Benjamin Clawhauser, a cheerful, overweight cheetah who works as the receptionist at the ZPD
- Bonnie Hunt as Bonnie Hopps, Judy's mother
- Don Lake as Stu Hopps, Judy's father
- Michelle Gomez as Captain Hoggbottom, a razorback who is the head of the ZPD's T.U.S.K. unit
- David Fane as Truffler, Hoggbottom's razorback partner
- David VanTuyle as Russ, a walrus
- Joe "Roman Reigns" Anoa'i and Phil "CM Punk" Brooks as Gene Zebraxton and Gene Zebrowski, a plains zebra and zebra-painted Sorraia who make up the ZPD cop duo known as the "Zebros"
- Stephanie Beatriz as Bloats, a hippopotamus ZPD cop
- Wilmer Valderrama as Higgins, a hippopotamus ZPD cop. He was previously voiced by Raymond S. Persi.
- Jean Reno as the following characters that he reprised in the French version:
  - Bûcheron, a markhor police officer
  - Chèvre, a bighorn sheep police officer and Bûcheron's partner
- Alan Tudyk as:
  - Duke Weaselton, a small-time least weasel crook
  - A French raccoon dog chef that oversees the catering at the Zootennial Gala
  - Molt Kohl, a green iguana at the Reptile Hangout who serves a drink to Buzz Shedley
  - An unseen reporter
- Macaulay Culkin as Cattrick Lynxley, the ambitious eldest son of Milton Lynxley
- Brenda Song as Kitty Lynxley, the sharp-tongued daughter of Milton Lynxley
- John Leguizamo as Antony Snootley, a giant anteater smuggler
- Tiny Lister as Finnick, a fennec fox and Nick's former partner in crime who acts undercover as a baby bunny. Lister, who died in 2020, reprises the role posthumously through unused recordings from the first film.
- Maurice LaMarche as Mr. Big, an arctic shrew crime boss in Tundratown
- Leah Latham as Fru Fru, an arctic shrew who is Mr. Big's daughter and Little Judith's mother
- Raymond S. Persi as Flash Slothmore, a three-toed sloth and Nick's close friend, who works at the DMV
- Jenny Slate as Dawn Bellwether, a sheep criminal mastermind and the disgraced former deputy mayor of Zootopia
- Josh Dallas as the pig owner of the local flower shop from the first film whose car gets taken by Judy and Nick to chase Snootley
- Auli'i Cravalho as the voice line from an anti-venom pen from Gary's pouch bag that he uses to cure Judy and Nibbles
- Hewitt Bush as Armpit Pete, a leopard gecko
- Blake Slatkin as Baalake Lambkin, a sheep visitor at a barbershop
- Nick DiGiovanni as Slick Di'Giguani, a desert iguana bartender
- Tig Notaro as Big Tig, a grizzly bear prisoner
- Sasha and Milan Piqué Mebarak as Binky and Binkston Hopps, Judy's younger brothers
- Bob Iger as Bob Tiger, a tiger weatherman
- Daniel V. Graulau as Buzz Shedley, an agama patron of the Reptile Hangout
- Amanda Gorman as Deerdra Bambino, a lesser kudu news reporter who reports from the red carpet at the Zootennial Gala
- Ed Sheeran as Ed Shearin, a sheep visitor at a barbershop whose makeover gets affected by Judy and Nick's pursuit of Snootley
- Yvette Nicole Brown as:
  - An EMT otter working with a jumbo unit to remove Zeke from a tuba
  - The Bearoness, a grizzly bear gala guest that Nick pickpockets from
- Tiffany Lonsdale as the unseen announcer of the Zootenial Gala
- George Pennacchio as George Purrnacleo, a lion news reporter at ZNN
- Byron Howard as:
  - Bucky Antlerson, one of Judy's greater kudu next-door neighbors
  - Berthold Hufschmerz, a German-accented Saanen goat living near the Cliffs of Coppenhoofen
  - Officer Joel, a white-tailed deer who is a police officer in the Zootopia Police Department
- Jared Bush as:
  - Jürgen Ziegenkäse, a German-accented Saanen goat living near the Cliffs of Coppenhoffen who is Berthold's friend
  - Pronk Oryx-Antlerson, one of Judy's gemsbok next-door neighbors
- June Squibb as Gram Gram, Judy's grandmother
- Rachel House as Gramma Taller, a giraffe prisoner
- Melissa G. Shepherd as a mouse prisoner who carries a knife
- Cecily Strong as Little Judith, Fru Fru's daughter and Judy's goddaughter
- Mario Lopez as Denny Howlett, a wolf reporter at ZNN
- Michael J. Fox as Michael J., a red fox prisoner
- Mark "Rhino" Smith as Officer McHorn, a black rhinoceros police officer
- Josh Gad as Paul Moldebrandt, an ornery mole who works as the Zootopia Police Department's IT expert
- Fabienne Rawley and Peter Mansbridge as Fabienne Growley and Peter Moosebridge, the snow leopard and moose anchors of the ZNN News
- Robert Irwin as Robert Furwin, a koala airport receptionist
- Anika Noni Rose as the announcer of the game show Squeal of Fortune
- Taylen Biggs as Tailen Smalls, a mouse gala guest that rides a champagne bottle cap from George Purrnacleo
- Mae Martin as Tuffy Cheeksworth, a golden hamster prisoner
- Tommy Chong as Yax, a laid-back yak who owns the Mystic Springs Oasis naturalist club in Sahara Square.
- Dwayne Johnson as Zeke, a dik-dik from a parade who accidentally gets stuck in a tuba

== Production ==
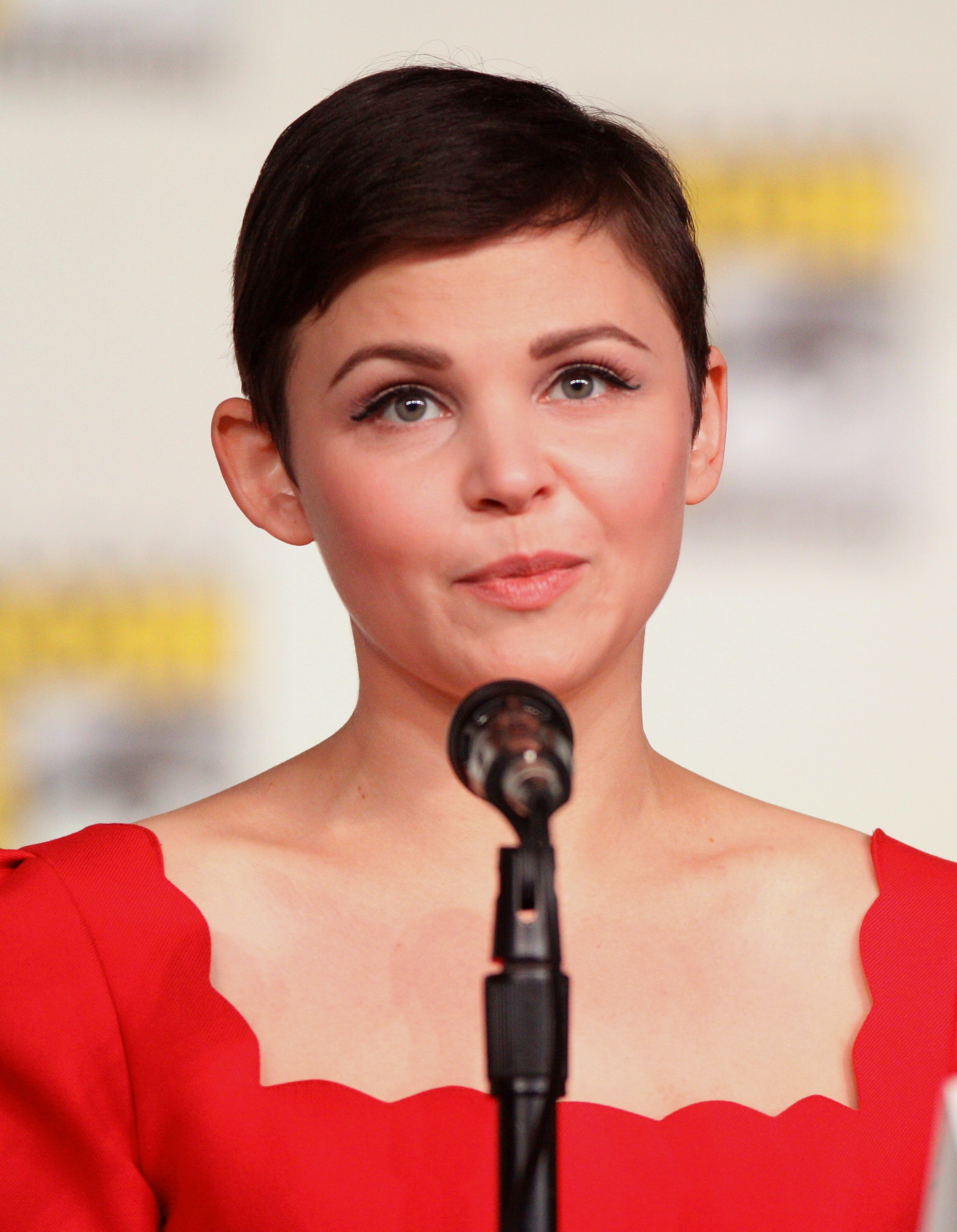
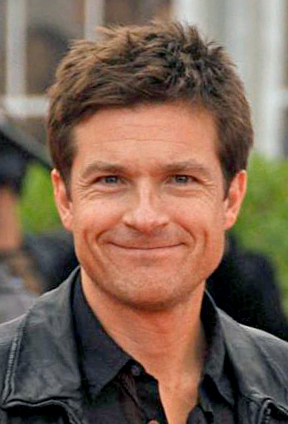
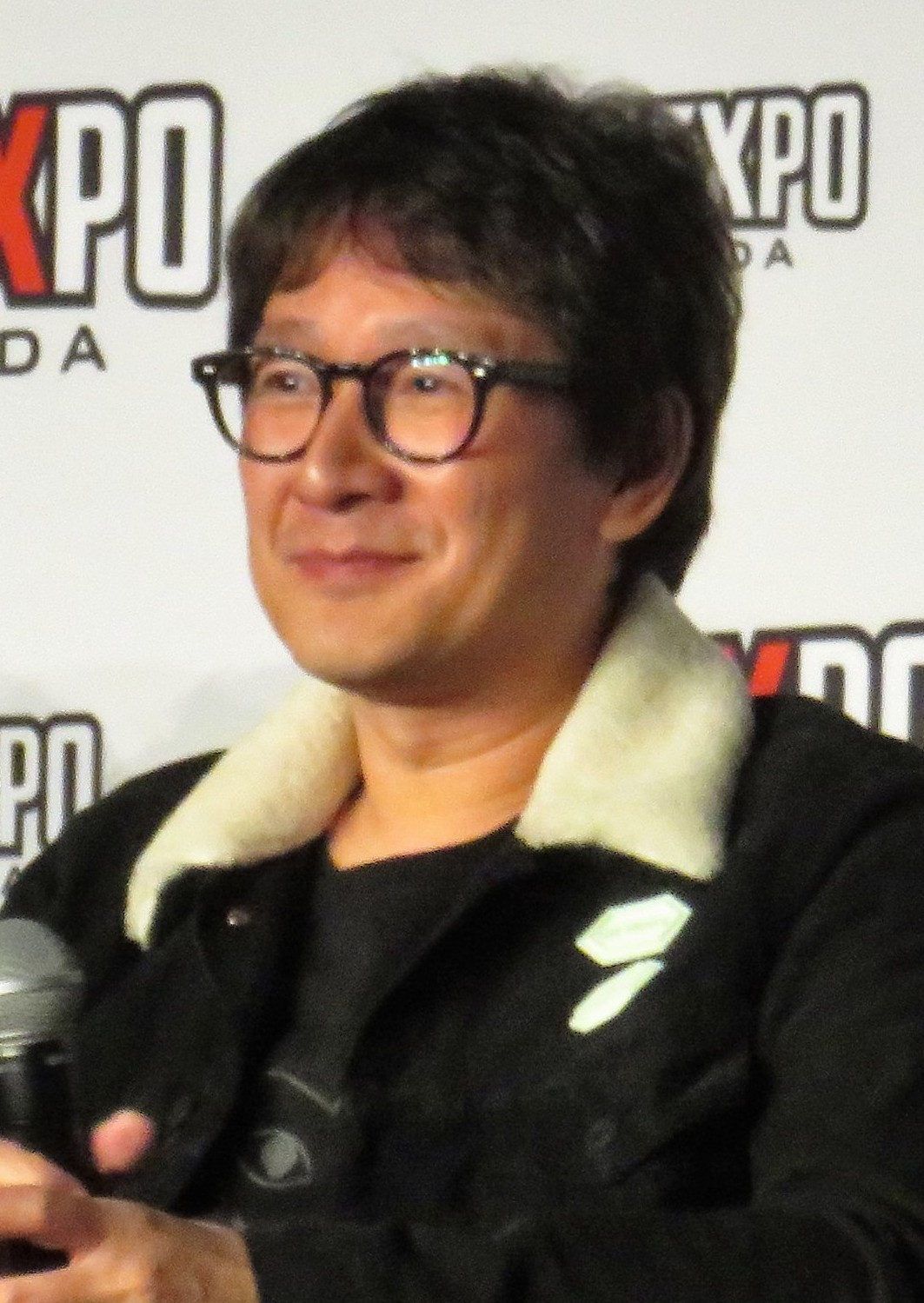
Ginnifer Goodwin and Jason Bateman reprised their respective roles as Judy and Nick, while Ke Huy Quan joined the cast as Gary.

In June 2016, directors Byron Howard and Rich Moore were in talks about the possibility of a Zootopia sequel. On February 8, 2023, during the Q1 earnings call, Disney CEO Bob Iger confirmed that the sequel was in active development. Later that day, screenwriter Jared Bush confirmed that he was working on the film. Ginnifer Goodwin, who voices Judy Hopps, told CinemaBlend that she would like to see a role reversal between Judy and Nick in the sequel. "I would like to see Nick have to be the one to convince Judy that the world is worth fighting for". Jason Bateman, who voices Nick Wilde, also told CinemaBlend about his idea for the sequel: "The two of us [Nick and Judy], kicking butts out there. Cleaning up the streets. We're a couple of new cops out there. So, bad guys, be warned."

On February 7, 2024, Iger announced the film's release date and that the film would be officially titled Zootopia 2. On April 15, Goodwin confirmed on her Instagram account that she began recording her lines for Judy, revealing that the film was in production. At the D23 Expo on August 9, it was announced that Zootopia 2 would feature reptiles, and Ke Huy Quan was announced to be playing Gary, a snake being pursued by Nick and Judy. Footage was also shown of a sequence in which Nick and Judy search for Gary in Marsh Market.

The following day, Bush revealed on his Twitter account that Fortune Feimster joined the cast to voice a beaver named Nibbles. That same month, Bush was announced as the sequel's sole writer and director, while Yvett Merino joined the project as producer. On September 19, Jared Bush became the new chief creative officer of Walt Disney Animation Studios following Jennifer Lee's resignation to be director of Frozen 3. The following day, Bush confirmed that Byron Howard, the original creator and director of Zootopia, had returned to be directing the sequel alongside him. On April 3, at CinemaCon, new footage from the film was shown that revealed the casting of Quinta Brunson as a new character named Dr. Fuzzby. At the 2025 Annecy International Animation Film Festival in June 2025, it was announced that Jean Reno would join the cast, and that Maurice LaMarche would reprise his role as Mr. Big. On July 30, 2025, it was announced that Idris Elba would reprise his role as Chief Bogo, despite busy commitments to work on live-action films such as Masters of the Universe and Children of Blood and Bone.

In August 2025, it was announced that Macaulay Culkin, Brenda Song, Patrick Warburton, and Wilmer Valderrama would join the cast. In September 2025, it was announced that Andy Samberg, David Strathairn, and Danny Trejo had joined the cast. That same month, it was revealed that unused recordings of Tommy Lister Jr. from the first film would be utilized for Finnick in the sequel. Lister died in 2020, which led to Disney contacting Lister's family for permission. The film was dedicated in Lister's memory per the credits. Originally, a scene in Zootopia 2 referencing the Silence of the Lambs prison encounter was four minutes long and taken verbatim from that film; however, it was cut down because children were unlikely to understand the reference and it slowed the movie's pacing.

After the film's release, Bush admitted that at the start of 2025 story adjustments were still being made, with some elements of the final film yet to be added. This included the honeymoon lodge setting and the breaking of the carrot pen.

== Music ==
On November 8, 2024, at D23 Brazil, Shakira publicly announced that she was returning to voice Gazelle for the sequel, revealing that she was writing a new song for the film alongside Ed Sheeran, and that Gazelle would don a new outfit. In September 2025, it was announced that the title for Shakira's song for the film, which she wrote with Ed Sheeran and Blake Slatkin, would be "Zoo". The song was featured in the Zootopia 2 trailer that was released on September 29, 2025, and it was released as a single on October 10, 2025. It was nominated for the 2026 Nickelodeon Kids' Choice Awards for Favorite Song from a Movie.

On June 16, 2025, Michael Giacchino was confirmed to be returning to compose the score. Giacchino's score was released as part of the film's full soundtrack on November 21, 2025.

== Release ==
Zootopia 2 premiered at the El Capitan Theatre in Hollywood, Los Angeles on November 13, 2025, and was released in the United States by Walt Disney Studios Motion Pictures on November 26, 2025.

=== Marketing ===
In November 2025, as a publicity stunt, three remote-controlled cars with animatronic puppets of the film's characters appeared in Los Angeles. They consisted of Nick, Judy, and Gary in a purple car, Finnick in his brown van, and Flash in his sports car. The stunt was reportedly received well by the public. From November 25, 2025, to December 7, 2025, a pop-up store in collaboration with Stray Kids was held in Seoul.

Airlines such as China Eastern Airlines, China Airlines and Air Canada have also featured Zootopia 2 characters as special airplane liveries on one of their planes (an Airbus A320-200, Boeing 777-300ER, and Airbus A220-300, respectively). Throughout the end of 2025, the film collaborated with various global franchises, like MINISO, for a themed, pop-up tour. They had a plethora of merchandise from plushies of Judy Hopps and Nick Wilde, to stationary sets and exclusive blind boxes.

=== Home media ===
Zootopia 2 was released on Digital HD platforms on January 27, 2026, on Blu-ray, Ultra HD Blu-ray, and DVD on March 3, and on Disney+ on March 11.

== Reception ==
=== Box office ===
Zootopia 2 grossed $428.1 million in the United States and Canada, and $1.442 billion in other territories, for a worldwide total of $1.870 billion. It was the second-highest-grossing film of 2025 and the second-highest-grossing animated film of all time, both behind Ne Zha 2.

The opening gross was $158.8 million in the United States and Canada over the five-day Thanksgiving weekend, and $560.3 million worldwide; the worldwide opening gross was the highest for an animated film and the fourth-highest overall. The film performed strongly in China, grossing $271.6 million through its opening weekend and becoming the first Hollywood film to gross over $100 million in a single day on Saturday, November 29. The worldwide gross reached $1 billion on December 12, within 17 days of release. By April 2, 2026, the film grossed over ¥15.7 billion (US$99.17 million) in Japan.

=== Critical response ===
Zootopia 2 received positive reviews from critics. On the review aggregator website Rotten Tomatoes, 92% of 229 critics' reviews are positive, with an average rating of 7.5/10. The website's consensus reads: "Cleverly laying a thoughtful message onto another crackerjack caper while solidifying Judy Hopps and Nick Wilde as one of the most endearing buddy pairings in ages, Zootopia 2 more than justifies a return trip to the big city." Metacritic, which uses a weighted average, assigned the film a score of 73 out of 100, based on 39 critics, indicating "generally favorable" reviews. Audiences polled by CinemaScore gave the film an average grade of "A" on an A+ to F scale, the same score as the first film, while those surveyed by PostTrak gave it an 87% overall positive score with 65% saying they would definitely recommend the film.

Nell Minow of RogerEbert.com gave the film four out of a possible four stars, writing, "Zootopia 2 is pure delight, every bit as exciting and heartwarming and imaginative as the Oscar-winning original and maybe even funnier". Frank Scheck of The Hollywood Reporter described it as "more than worth the lengthy wait, knocking it out of the park with its dazzling visuals, sophisticated humor and doses of genuine emotion."

Clint Gage of IGN wrote "On the surface, Zootopia 2 is a bunch of cartoon animals solving crime and making jokes and learning to love and appreciate each other, but lurking beyond that silliness is a seedy underbelly of social criticism that deserves to be taken seriously". Ed Potton of The Times gave it a four out of five scoring, stating that "perhaps most delightful, though, are the carefully drawn supporting characters, with welcome returns for Flash the sloth and Maurice LaMarche, the Vito Corleone-esque arctic shrew. Truly an offer you can't refuse".

BJ Colangelo of /Film felt it was one of Disney's best movies in years, saying "Judy Hopps and Nick Wilde have solidified themselves as an all-time great duo in the animated Disney canon, and I beg that this won't be the last we see of them ... Zootopia 2 may be the gateway to teach young viewers to question who sets the rules, and be inspired to break those rules if it means doing what's right. Quinn D'Alessio of The Maine Campus praised Judy and Nick's relationship, the plot's similarities to the original film, and the new characters Gary De'Snake and Nibbles Maplestick, though felt that the film was not as good as the first.

Peter Bradshaw, reviewing for The Guardian, gave the film two stars out of a possible five, describing it as "a soulless film-by-numbers affair filled with corporately approved jokes ... the kind of movie you put on an iPad to keep the children quiet on a long plane or train journey ... the heart and soul are lacking." Jake Coyle of the Associated Press gave it a mixed review, saying it "[spent] too much of its time away from its mammalian metropolis ... The fun caper spirit of the first movie is alive enough to carry Bush and Howard's film, but you can't help feel like sequel-ization also means domestication."

Soren Andersen of The Seattle Times wrote, "Zootopia 2 comes on strong. Too strong. It seeks to bowl the audience over with noise, velocity, and an insistent tone that frankly winds up being kind of irritating." Caroline Siede of The A.V. Club praised the worldbuilding but felt that the plot was too similar to that of the first one, feeling Disney was "less invested in Zootopia as an artistic effort, churning out a sequel that feels more like a Disney+ TV show than an animated epic."

=== Accolades ===
Zootopia 2 garnered awards and nominations in various ceremonies, with recognition for its direction, animation, and voice performances. At the 31st Critics' Choice Awards, it was nominated for Best Animated Feature. It was also nominated for two awards at the 83rd Golden Globe Awards, Best Motion Picture – Animated and Cinematic and Box Office Achievement. The film was also nominated for seven awards at the 53rd Annie Awards, including Best Feature and Best Writing – Feature for Jared Bush. At the 98th Academy Awards, the film was nominated for Best Animated Feature. It was also nominated for two British Academy Film Awards, winning Best Animated Film.

== Sequel ==
Talks of a third Zootopia film began before Zootopia 2 released in theaters, with both directors and actors openly discussing different possibilities. On December 21, 2025, directors Howard and Bush confirmed that Bush had begun making early sketches for a third film. On August 15, 2026, at D23, Zootopia 3 was officially announced to be in development. Goodwin, Bateman, and Quan will all reprise their respective voice roles as Judy Hopps, Nick Wilde, and Gary De'Snake.
