= Fola Evans-Akingbola =

English actress (born c. 1995)

- Born: 1995 (age 30–31); London, England
- Other name: Fola Akingbola
- Occupation: Actress
- Years active: 2014–present
- Agent(s): B-Side Management and Range Media Partners
- Partner: Curtis Lum (engaged 2022)
- Relatives: Jimmy Akingbola (uncle)

Fola Evans-Akingbola (/ˈɑːkiːnˈboʊlɑː/) is a British actress. She is known for roles such as Maddie Bishop in the Freeform series Siren and United States Secret Service Special Agent Chelsea Arrington in the 2023 Netflix series The Night Agent. Other credits include Holby City (2014), Death in Paradise (2016), Game of Thrones (2016), Black Mirror, episode "Striking Vipers" (2019), and Ten Percent (2022).

== Early life and education ==
Evans-Akingbola was born in London, to an English anthropologist mother, Gillian Evans, (Note: Not to be confused with British philosopher Gillian Evans.) and Nigerian musician father Sola Akingbola (of the band Jamiroquai). She was raised in Bermondsey, and educated at Alleyn's School in Dulwich, graduating sixth form in 2012.

She received acting training at the National Youth Theatre. She later resumed actor training at the Identity School of Acting.

== Career ==
Before acting professionally, Evans-Akingbola worked as a model.

Her first acting credits were for the BBC series Holby City (2014). While appearing on a BBC series, Death in Paradise, Evans-Akingbola was cast in the popular HBO series Game of Thrones, as the second wife of Khal Moro during season 6 in 2016.

Since 2017, she was a main character on Siren, playing marine biologist Madelyn Bishop. She has also directed, co-wrote, and produced a short film called Grandma's 80th Surprise and done voiceover work for Assassin's Creed video games.

For Netflix's Black Mirror, she appeared in a 2019 episode called "Striking Vipers" as Mariella, a younger Millennial woman dating Karl (played by Yahya Abdul-Mateen II), the co-protagonist, but events suggest her relationship with Karl is quite shallow.

Evans-Akingbola played Special Agent Chelsea Arrington in the 2023 Netflix series The Night Agent.

== Personal life ==
Evans-Akingbola is in a relationship with Canadian actor Curtis Lum. The two worked together in Siren (2018–2020) and both appeared in the 2023 season of The Night Agent. They became engaged in 2022.

== Filmography ==
Year	Title	Role	Notes
2014	Youngers	Reanne (uncredited)	Episode: "Links"
2014	Holby City	Amaani Qalanjo	Episode: "True Colours"
2016	Death in Paradise	Rosey Fabrice	4 episodes
2016	Game of Thrones	Moro's Wife #2	2 episodes
2016	Dawn	Pakalan	TV movie
2017	An American Exorcism	Angelica	Feature film
2017	Assassin's Creed: Origins	Voice Talent	Video game (as Fola Akingbola)
2018–2020	Siren	Maddie Bishop	Main cast
2018	VS.	Makayla	Feature film
2019	Black Mirror	Mariella	Episode: "Striking Vipers"
2022	Ten Percent	Zoe Spencer	Main cast
2022	Trying	Harper	Main cast (season 2)
2023–2026	The Night Agent	Chelsea Arrington	Main cast (seasons 1 and 3); guest (season 2)
2024	Upgraded	Renee	Feature/television film
2025	Back in Action	Wendy	Feature/television film
2025	Film Club	Samantha	Recurring role
