= The Host (Ash vs Evil Dead) =

- Ash vs Evil Dead episode
- Episode no.: Season 1 Episode 5
- Directed by: David Frazee
- Written by: Zoë Green
- Cinematography by: Dave Garbett
- Editing by: Bryan Shaw
- Original release date: November 28, 2015
- Running time: 29 minutes

Guest appearances
- Hemky Madera as El Brujo; Ben Fransham as Eligos

Episode chronology
← Previous "Brujo"	Next → "The Killer of Killers"

"The Host" is the fifth episode of the first season of the American comedy horror television series Ash vs Evil Dead, which serves as a continuation of the Evil Dead trilogy. The episode was written by Zoë Green, and directed by David Frazee. It originally aired on the premium channel Starz on November 28, 2015.

The series is set 30 years after the events of the Evil Dead trilogy, and follows Ash Williams, who now works at the "Value Stop" as a simple stock boy. Having spent his life not doing anything remarkable since the events of the trilogy, Ash will have to renounce his routine existence and become a hero once more by taking up arms and facing the titular Evil Dead. In the episode, Eligos' possession of Kelly causes problem for Ash and Pablo.

According to Nielsen Media Research, the episode was seen by an estimated 0.430 million household viewers and gained a 0.15 ratings share among adults aged 18–49. The episode received positive reviews from critics, who praised the resolution to the Eligos story arc.

== Plot ==
Pablo (Ray Santiago) and El Brujo (Hemky Madera) tie Ash (Bruce Campbell) up, believing that he is possessed by Eligos (Ben Fransham), unaware that Kelly (Dana DeLorenzo) is the one who is possessed. El Brujo intends to exorcise Ash, with implication that he would kill him if it fails. Kelly takes Pablo to Ash's home trailer, where they smoke his marijuana and she tries to seduce him. Meanwhile, Amanda (Jill Marie Jones) and Ruby (Lucy Lawless) are following Ash, using his severed hand as the guide.

As El Brujo prepares the exorcism, Ash convinces him that Kelly is the one possessed. They hurry back to the home trailer, where a possessed Kelly tried to kill Pablo with Ash's shotgun. They retrieve her and El Brujo performs the exorcism, which proves to be far more difficult than expected, with Eligos resisting the steps and holy water. With no option, El Brujo suggests they must kill Kelly, or Eligos will take control of her body. Unwilling to let Kelly die, Pablo confronts Eligos, offering himself as his new host. Eligos steps out of Kelly's mouth, attacking the team, including killing El Brujo by impaling him.

Ash tries to kill Eligos, but his teleportation makes it difficult to aim his shotgun. Remembering his "shoot first, think never" advice he learned from his hallucinogenic journey, Ash finally gets to aim his shotgun and kill Eligos. Pablo then gives his uncle a funeral pyre, lamenting to not listening him earlier. The pyre reveals Brujo's sacred Santa Muerte medallion, which Pablo picks up. As they leave Brujo's property, Pablo also gives Ash a new mechanical hand to replace his old one, which also allows him to properly move his right hand for the first time in decades.

== Production ==
=== Development ===
The episode was written by Zoë Green, and directed by David Frazee. It was Green's first writing credit, and Frazee's second directorial credit.

== Reception ==
=== Viewers ===
In its original American broadcast, "The Host" was seen by an estimated 0.430 million household viewers and gained a 0.15 ratings share among adults aged 18–49, according to Nielsen Media Research. This means that 0.15 percent of all households with televisions watched the episode. This was a slight decrease in viewership from the previous episode, which was watched by 0.448 million viewers with a 0.20 in the 18-49 demographics.

=== Critical reviews ===
"The Host" received positive reviews from critics. Matt Fowler of IGN gave the episode a "great" 8 out of 10 rating and wrote in his verdict, "'The Host' ended the Elegos arc in awesomely violent fashion, though perhaps at the expense of some of the franchise's zaniness. I like the idea of Ash maturing into a regretful, responsible hero, but I'd be lying if I said it'd be easy to get used to. Despite the acid spit and the leech-filled vomit and some of the other crazy, out-there elements in this episode, this Ash felt like a far cry from the Ash in the premiere who - say - dropped all those lightbulbs. Or even the Ash who got stoned and read from the Necronomicon."

Michael Roffman of The A.V. Club gave the episode an "A–" grade and wrote, "It's a good sign when the show's titular lead can spend the first quarter of an episode gagged and not one minute suffers. That's the unlikely power this series has midway through its first season, and it's an enviable position the franchise hasn't experienced in a long, long time. At least, not since the beginning of 1981's The Evil Dead, when audiences could follow any face without wondering, Well, where's Ash? 'The Host' hearkens back to those 'salad days' by widening the story to accommodate its supporting cast — in this case, Pablo, who finally has enough."

Gina McIntyre of Entertainment Weekly wrote, "It's a rare thing in the Evil Dead universe to truly recover from a demonic possession — Ash is one of the few who's played host to a malevolent spirit and lived to tell the tale, and to be fair, that was a couple of movies ago. Meaning that, at the outset of tonight’s installment of Ash Vs. Evil Dead, Kelly's future wasn't looking too bright, what with Eligos still inhabiting her body." Stephen Harber of Den of Geek wrote, "This tacks on a triumphant end to an uneven half hour that reminds us that above all else, Ash vs Evil Dead is a stoner horror sitcom."

Carissa Pavlica of TV Fanatic gave the episode a 4 star rating out of 5 and wrote, "While that might not be the very best of phrases for those of you sporting guns in the real world, it sure worked for our hero on 'The Host'." Jasef Wisener of TV Overmind wrote, "As I had hoped, 'The Host' got back to the greatness that this series showed in its first few episodes before taking an unfortunate pause last week." Blair Marnell of Nerdist wrote, "Half way through the first season, Ash vs. Evil Dead has been everything that I could have hoped for: fun, hilarious, and entertaining."
