= List of Sleepy Hollow episodes =

Sleepy Hollow is an American supernatural drama television series that premiered on Fox on September 16, 2013 and ended on March 31, 2017. The series is considered a "modern-day retelling" of the 1820 short story "The Legend of Sleepy Hollow" by Washington Irving with added concepts from "Rip Van Winkle", also by Irving. The series was renewed for a fourth and final season which premiered on January 6, 2017.

During the course of the series, 62 episodes of Sleepy Hollow aired over four seasons.

== Series overview ==
Season	Episodes	Originally released	
Season	Episodes	First released	Last released
1	13	September 16, 2013	January 20, 2014
2	18	September 22, 2014	February 23, 2015
3	18	October 1, 2015	April 8, 2016
4	13	January 6, 2017	March 31, 2017

== Episodes ==
=== Season 1 (2013–14) ===
No. overall	No. in season	Title	Directed by	Written by	Original release date	Prod. code	US viewers (millions)
1	1	"Pilot"	Len Wiseman	Story by : Roberto Orci & Alex Kurtzman & Phillip Iscove & Len Wiseman; Teleplay by : Alex Kurtzman & Roberto Orci & Phillip Iscove	September 16, 2013	1AWL79	10.10
2	2	"Blood Moon"	Ken Olin	Roberto Orci & Alex Kurtzman & Mark Goffman	September 23, 2013	1AWL01	8.59
3	3	"For the Triumph of Evil"	John F. Showalter	Story by : Phillip Iscove; Teleplay by : Jose Molina	September 30, 2013	1AWL02	7.97
4	4	"The Lesser Key of Solomon"	Paul Edwards	Damian Kindler	October 7, 2013	1AWL03	7.96
5	5	"John Doe"	Ernest Dickerson	Melissa Blake	October 14, 2013	1AWL04	7.59
6	6	"The Sin Eater"	Ken Olin	Story by : Aaron Rahsaan Thomas; Teleplay by : Alex Kurtzman & Mark Goffman	November 4, 2013	1AWL05	7.08
7	7	"The Midnight Ride"	Doug Aarniokoski	Heather V. Regnier	November 11, 2013	1AWL06	7.03
8	8	"Necromancer"	Paul Edwards	Mark Goffman & Phillip Iscove	November 18, 2013	1AWL07	7.09
9	9	"Sanctuary"	Liz Friedlander	Damian Kindler & Chitra Elizabeth Sampath	November 25, 2013	1AWL08	6.56
10	10	"The Golem"	J. Miller Tobin	Story by : Alex Kurtzman; Teleplay by : Mark Goffman & Jose Molina	December 9, 2013	1AWL09	6.65
11	11	"The Vessel"	Romeo Tirone	Story by : Mark Goffman & David McMillan; Teleplay by : Melissa Blake	January 13, 2014	1AWL10	6.46
12	12	"The Indispensable Man"	Adam Kane	Story by : Sam Chalsen; Teleplay by : Damian Kindler & Heather V. Regnier	January 20, 2014	1AWL11	6.82
13	13	"Bad Blood"	Ken Olin	Alex Kurtzman & Mark Goffman	January 20, 2014	1AWL12	7.05

=== Season 2 (2014–15) ===
No. overall	No. in season	Title	Directed by	Written by	Original release date	Prod. code	US viewers (millions)
14	1	"This Is War"	Ken Olin	Mark Goffman	September 22, 2014	2AWL01	5.51
15	2	"The Kindred"	Paul Edwards	Mark Goffman & Albert Kim	September 29, 2014	2AWL02	5.04
16	3	"Root of All Evil"	Jeffrey Hunt	Melissa Blake & Donald Todd	October 6, 2014	2AWL04	4.46
17	4	"Go Where I Send Thee..."	Doug Aarniokoski	Damian Kindler	October 13, 2014	2AWL03	4.76
18	5	"The Weeping Lady"	Larry Teng	M. Raven Metzner	October 20, 2014	2AWL05	5.02
19	6	"And the Abyss Gazes Back"	Doug Aarniokoski	Heather V. Regnier	October 27, 2014	2AWL06	4.62
20	7	"Deliverance"	Nick Copus	Sam Chalsen & Nelson Greaves	November 3, 2014	2AWL07	4.52
21	8	"Heartless"	David Boyd	Albert Kim	November 10, 2014	2AWL08	4.65
22	9	"Mama"	Wendey Stanzler	Damian Kindler	November 17, 2014	2AWL09	4.68
23	10	"Magnum Opus"	Doug Aarniokoski	Donald Todd	November 24, 2014	2AWL10	4.28
24	11	"The Akeda"	Dwight Little	Mark Goffman	December 1, 2014	2AWL11	4.51
25	12	"Paradise Lost"	Russell Fine	M. Raven Metzner	January 5, 2015	2AWL12	4.48
26	13	"Pittura Infamante"	John Leonetti	Melissa Blake	January 19, 2015	2AWL13	4.19
27	14	"Kali Yuga"	Doug Aarniokoski	Story by : Heather V. Regnier; Teleplay by : Sam Chalsen & Nelson Greaves	January 26, 2015	2AWL14	4.37
28	15	"Spellcaster"	Paul Edwards	Albert Kim	February 2, 2015	2AWL15	4.38
29	16	"What Lies Beneath"	Dwight Little	Story by : Damian Kindler & Phillip Iscove; Teleplay by : Damian Kindler	February 9, 2015	2AWL16	3.87
30	17	"Awakening"	Doug Aarniokoski	M. Raven Metzner	February 16, 2015	2AWL17	4.47
31	18	"Tempus Fugit"	Paul Edwards	Mark Goffman	February 23, 2015	2AWL18	4.35

=== Season 3 (2015–16) ===
No. overall	No. in season	Title	Directed by	Written by	Original release date	Prod. code	US viewers (millions)
32	1	"I, Witness"	Peter Weller	Albert Kim	October 1, 2015	3AWL02	3.46
33	2	"Whispers in the Dark"	Russell Fine	M. Raven Metzner	October 8, 2015	3AWL01	3.27
34	3	"Blood and Fear"	Kate Dennis	Damian Kindler	October 15, 2015	3AWL03	2.97
35	4	"The Sisters Mills"	Guillermo Navarro	Heather V. Regnier	October 22, 2015	3AWL04	2.89
36	5	"Dead Men Tell No Tales"	Russell Fine	Sam Chalsen & Nelson Greaves	October 29, 2015	3AWL05	4.57
37	6	"This Red Lady from Caribee"	Olatunde Osunsanmi	Shernold Edwards	November 5, 2015	3AWL06	3.04
38	7	"The Art of War"	Hanelle Culpepper	Joe Webb	November 12, 2015	3AWL07	3.02
39	8	"Novus Ordo Seclorum"	Russell Fine	Leigh Dana Jackson	November 19, 2015	3AWL08	2.80
40	9	"One Life"	Kate Dennis	Albert Kim	February 5, 2016	3AWL09	3.13
41	10	"Incident At Stone Manor"	Dwight Little	M. Raven Metzner	February 12, 2016	3AWL10	3.16
42	11	"Kindred Spirits"	Olatunde Osunsanmi	Heather V. Regina	February 19, 2016	3AWL11	3.09
43	12	"Sins of the Father"	Wendey Stanzler	Damian Kindler	February 26, 2016	3AWL12	2.96
44	13	"Dark Mirror"	Sylvain White	Sam Chalsen & Nelson Greaves	March 4, 2016	3AWL13	2.96
45	14	"Into the Wild"	Paul Edwards	Albert Kim	March 11, 2016	3AWL14	2.91
46	15	"Incommunicado"	Russell Fine	Shernold Edwards & Heather V. Regnier	March 18, 2016	3AWL15	2.83
47	16	"Dawn's Early Light"	Paul Edwards	Leigh Dana Jackson & Sam Chalsen & Nelson Greaves	March 25, 2016	3AWL16	2.52
48	17	"Delaware"	Marc Roskin	Damian Kindler	April 1, 2016	3AWL17	2.62
49	18	"Ragnarok"	Russell Fine	M. Raven Metzner	April 8, 2016	3AWL18	2.96

=== Season 4 (2017) ===
No. overall	No. in season	Title	Directed by	Written by	Original release date	Prod. code	US viewers (millions)
50	1	"Columbia"	Russell Fine	Albert Kim	January 6, 2017	4AWL01	2.19
51	2	"In Plain Sight"	Marc Roskin	Bryan Q. Miller	January 13, 2017	4AWL02	2.14
52	3	"Heads of State"	Kellie Cyrus	M. Raven Metzner	January 20, 2017	4AWL03	1.91
53	4	"The People v. Ichabod Crane"	Jim O'Hanlon	Sam Chalsen	January 27, 2017	4AWL04	2.16
54	5	"Blood from a Stone"	Marc Roskin	Theo Travers	February 3, 2017	4AWL05	1.83
55	6	"Homecoming"	Jim O'Hanlon	Joe Webb	February 10, 2017	4AWL06	2.00
56	7	"Loco Parentis"	Russell Fine	Zoë Green	February 17, 2017	4AWL07	1.82
57	8	"Sick Burn"	Darnell Martin	Joey Falco	February 24, 2017	4AWL08	1.78
58	9	"Child's Play"	Michael Goi	Francisca X. Hu	March 3, 2017	4AWL09	1.88
59	10	"Insatiable"	Steven A. Adelson	Keely MacDonald	March 10, 2017	4AWL10	1.74
60	11	"The Way of the Gun"	Russell Fine	Bryan Q. Miller	March 17, 2017	4AWL11	1.82
61	12	"Tomorrow"	Marc Roskin	Albert Kim	March 24, 2017	4AWL12	1.96
62	13	"Freedom"	Russell Fine	M. Raven Metzner	March 31, 2017	4AWL13	1.72

== Ratings ==
Sleepy Hollow : U.S. viewers per episode (millions)

Season	Episode number																		Average
Season	1	2	3	4	5	6	7	8	9	10	11	12	13	14	15	16	17	18	Average
1	10.10	8.59	7.97	7.96	7.59	7.08	7.03	7.09	6.56	6.65	6.46	6.82	7.05	–					8.60
2	5.51	5.04	4.46	4.76	5.02	4.62	4.52	4.65	4.68	4.28	4.51	4.48	4.19	4.37	4.38	3.87	4.47	4.35	6.12
3	3.46	3.27	2.97	2.89	4.57	3.04	3.02	2.80	3.13	3.16	3.09	2.96	2.96	2.91	2.83	2.52	2.62	2.96	4.82
4	2.19	2.14	1.91	2.16	1.83	2.00	1.82	1.78	1.88	1.74	1.82	1.96	1.72	–					1.91

Audience measurement performed by Nielsen Media Research
