= Sleepy Hollow season 4 =

Season of television series

Sleepy Hollow
- Season 4
- Starring: Tom Mison; Janina Gavankar; Lyndie Greenwood; Jerry MacKinnon; Rachel Melvin; Oona Yaffe; Jeremy Davies
- No. of episodes: 13

Release
- Original network: Fox
- Original release: January 6 – March 31, 2017

Season chronology
- ← Previous; Season 3

The fourth and final season of the Fox television series Sleepy Hollow premiered on January 6, 2017, and concluded on March 31, 2017, and consisted of 13 episodes.

== Cast and characters ==
=== Main cast ===
- Tom Mison as Ichabod Crane
- Janina Gavankar as Agent Diana Thomas
- Lyndie Greenwood as Jennifer "Jenny" Mills
- Jerry MacKinnon as Jake Wells
- Rachel Melvin as Alex Norwood
- Oona Yaffe as Molly Thomas
- Jeremy Davies as Malcolm Dreyfuss

=== Recurring cast ===
- Kamar de los Reyes as Jobe
- Robbie Kay as Logan MacDonald
- Seychelle Gabriel as Lara, an older incarnation of Molly from a dystopian future.

=== Guest cast ===
- John Noble as Henry Parrish / Jeremy Crane
- Edwin Hodge as Benjamin Banneker
- Jeremy Owens as the Headless Horseman
- Courtney Lakin as Marg Dyer
- Kelley Missal as Malligo Dyer
- Sara Sanderson as Moll Dyer
- Griff Furst as Mr. Branson
- James Kyson as Diana's boss
- Alexander Ward as demon John Wilkes Booth / Sicarius Spei
- Adrian Bond as John Wilkes Booth
- John Zachary as Abraham Lincoln
- Karen Coles as Mary Todd Lincoln
- Mark Campbell as George Washington
- Eric Joshua Davis as John André
- Charmin Lee as Madame President
- Onira Tarés as Grace Dixon
- Marti Matulis as the Sphinx
- Bill Heck as Mitch Thomas / the Barghest
- Brent McGee as Captain William Bradford
- Maggie Geha as a restaurant hostess

== Episodes ==
No. overall	No. in season	Title	Directed by	Written by	Original release date	Prod. code	US viewers (millions)
50	1	"Columbia"	Russell Fine	Albert Kim	January 6, 2017	4AWL01	2.19
Several weeks after the death of Abbie Mills, Ichabod is held and questioned by a man about his past and is shown detailed pictures of his investigations and of Abbie. Ichabod distracts and knocks out the man, and discovers a reference to the Lincoln Memorial before escaping. Meanwhile, Homeland Security agent Diana Thomas and her partner Eric investigate the headless statue of Lincoln at the memorial, and Eric is attacked and killed by a demon, which nearly kills Diana as well before Ichabod chases it off. The two form a partnership and travel to "Agency 355", a division of the government that deals with paranormal threats. While there, Ichabod and Diana meet technician Alex Norwood and historian Jake Wells, and learn that the demon is from 1865, and was summoned by John Wilkes Booth, who used it to kill Lincoln. They learn that the demon is drawn to the American flag, and is weak against copper, which they use to set a trap. At the last second, Jenny shows up and destroys the demon, saving Jake's life.
51	2	"In Plain Sight"	Marc Roskin	Bryan Q. Miller	January 13, 2017	4AWL02	2.14
Ichabod experiences a prophetic dream where he's at the Archives, and encounters a young girl whom he describes as no more than ten or eleven years of age. When he awakens, he travels to The Vault to learn more about his dream. Malcolm Dreyfuss meets with the Dyer sisters, a coven of immortal witches, to exchange the dagger of Z'urn D'oragh for the Witches Stone. Malcolm reveals that Moll, the coven's leader, has lied to the others, who kill her in revenge before escaping into the city. Ichabod and Diana investigate Moll's death, and Ichabod tells Diana that the coven helped Washington expose John André, for which he rewarded them with a plot of land. Ichabod recognizes the picture of Molly on Diana's phone as the girl from his dream and tasks Jenny with investigating her. At Molly's school, Jenny steps in and stops two girls from bullying Molly before Ichabod and Diana arrive. Molly breaks her silence by greeting Ichabod. They track the Dyer sisters to their sanctum and discover an "infernal machine" that maintains their immortality, which Ichabod destroys. Ichabod and Jenny decide not to tell Diana that Molly is the next Witness.
52	3	"Heads of State"	Kellie Cyrus	M. Raven Metzner	January 20, 2017	4AWL03	1.91
While helping Ichabod look for an apartment, Jenny urges him to reveal Molly's secret to Diana. That evening, a mounted policeman stages an assassination attempt on the President, and turns out to be the Headless Horseman in disguise. While investigating the scene, the group discovers protective magic glyphs left by Benjamin Banneker, and Crane's clumsy attempt to explain how he knows this leads to Diana's discovery that he is a time traveler. Jenny discovers that a surviving collection of Banneker's papers is in Dreyfuss' hands, and Diana and Ichabod learn from him of the existence of "J Street", which Banneker designed as a trap for supernatural beings. After conversing with Jenny, in which she mentions the four white trees she saw as a child, Diana finds similar drawings in Molly's sketchbook. The group lures the Horseman into an isolated location, which they then seal off using the glyphs. Diana refuses to let Ichabod train her daughter to become a Witness, while Dreyfuss visits the Horseman and frees him in exchange for his assistance. While building some furniture, Ichabod is attacked by an unknown entity.
53	4	"The People v. Ichabod Crane"	Jim O'Hanlon	Sam Chalsen	January 27, 2017	4AWL04	2.16
After Ichabod fails to show up for a meeting with Diana, Jenny searches his apartment and finds traces of spider silk, which Jake identifies as belonging to the "Sicarius Spei", a demon identified by Benjamin Franklin in 1778, and capable of trapping its victims in an illusion of their greatest fears until they are driven to absolute despair. Ichabod finds himself on trial for the "murder" of Abigail Mills, with Henry acting as prosecutor. While searching for the demon's cave, Jenny is arrested for trespassing; Diana bails her out and the two find Crane wrapped in a cocoon. Unable to free him, they return to the Vault and conduct further research, learning from an account left by Grace Dixon that the same demon was responsible for the suffering Washington's forces endured at Valley Forge. Dixon also describes a flammable compound she invented to destroy the demon's webbing, and Jake and Alex go to retrieve torches, during which they witness Dreyfuss' bodyguard Jobe steal a map of ley lines. The demon shows Ichabod a vision of Molly and the others dying because of him, and while Jenny manages to kill the demon, he attempts suicide. Diana has Molly indirectly speak to Ichabod, freeing him from the illusion. Alex and Jake take a sample of the demon's webbing back to the Vault, where it forms an image of Henry's face.
54	5	"Blood from a Stone"	Marc Roskin	Theo Travers	February 3, 2017	4AWL05	1.83
Jobe takes another talisman from a crooked preacher, but it is subsequently stolen by a mysterious sorcerer. Crane and Diana go to question Dreyfuss about a missing persons case, while the sorcerer breaks in and locks down the building, revealing himself to be Ansel, Dreyfuss' late partner. While searching for him, Diana and Ichabod find canisters of Greek fire throughout the basement, realizing that Ansel intends to kill Malcolm and destroy the building. Ansel confronts Malcolm, where he explains that his power comes from the sigils he received during his imprisonment in Hell. Ichabod temporarily subdues him, and they lock themselves inside Malcolm's secret sub-basement. Jake finds an incantation that can disrupt the sigils in the works of John Dee, and Jenny finds a way to sneak into the building through the air vents. Malcolm explains that he sold his soul to Jobe in exchange for "the life he was meant to have", which included Ansel's downfall. Jenny enters the sub-basement and utters the incantation, stripping Ansel of his power and allowing Ichabod to kill him. Dreyfuss escapes with the artifact he's been assembling, which turns out to be the Philosopher's Stone, which can give him immortality. Jenny determines that Dreyfuss is headed to Sleepy Hollow, where the final piece of the Stone is hidden.
55	6	"Homecoming"	Jim O'Hanlon	Joe Webb	February 10, 2017	4AWL06	2.00
Dreyfuss revives Jobe to guide him to the final piece of the Talisman, while Ichabod and the others arrive in Sleepy Hollow. Jenny attempts to track the artifact, but encounters a high level of magical interference, forcing Ichabod to take the team to his old base in the Archives for maps. Diana and Ichabod find letters explaining how Washington tasked Banneker with dividing the Stone into four pieces, but not before asking him to use it for an unspecified purpose. Jenny and the others find the piece, but are attacked by a demon, which Ichabod identifies as a sphinx. Jenny, Jake, and Alex stage a distraction, while Ichabod and Diana access the crypt where the piece is kept and solve the riddle that empowers the sphinx, causing it to weaken and die when Jenny shoots it. Jobe ambushes Crane and transports him to the spot where he had died on the battlefield (back in 1781), where Dreyfuss reveals that Crane gained his immortality from the Stone, which Washington arranged to ensure that he would be able to defeat the Headless Horseman at the cost of his own life. Dreyfuss summons forth the Horseman in order to create an elixir of eternal life from his and Crane's blood. Jenny subdues Jobe, while the others set charges to destroy the Stone. However, Dreyfuss survives due to having consumed the elixir, and is now effectively immortal.
56	7	"Loco Parentis"	Russell Fine	Zoë Green	February 17, 2017	4AWL07	1.82
While visiting Arlington National Cemetery, a woman is killed by a ferocious creature. Jenny finds the damaged lantern holding Jobe and manages to bind him before he escapes. Molly asks Ichabod to explain what being a Witness means, but he refuses to discuss it without Diana. Molly's father, Mitch, returns home from Afghanistan, and he and Diana reconnect. While investigating the woman's death, Ichabod and Diana learn of two other deaths, with the first occurring outside Sleepy Hollow. Based on the evidence, they conclude that Dreyfuss has been transformed into a monster by the Stone. During a coffee date with Mitch, Diana receives a call that a fourth victim has been found who was killed before the Stone was destroyed, meaning Dreyfuss is not the monster. Ichabod informs Diana that the monster is the Barghest, a European wolf demon that inspired the villain in "Little Red Riding Hood". As the Barghest has the ability to shapeshift, she deduces that "Mitch" is an imposter and is targeting Molly because of her status as a Witness. A suspicious Molly ditches the Barghest, and Jenny releases Jobe in return for directions to find her. Using them, Ichabod and Diana kill the Barghest with feldspar bolts. Dreyfuss returns to his company showing signs of demonic corruption, and explains to Jobe that he intends to take the world "on the same path".
57	8	"Sick Burn"	Darnell Martin	Joey Falco	February 24, 2017	4AWL08	1.78
Dreyfuss experiences a vision of a world in which he has conquered the United States, with an elderly Ichabod as his prisoner. At an event for popular Internet star Logan McDonald, the star collapses from an unknown ailment after borrowing Molly's phone. At the hospital, another victim of the illness suddenly bursts into flames, confirming it to be supernatural in origin. Ichabod links the outbreak to a curse used by the British to burn Washington during the War of 1812. Alex soon reveals to Jake that she is infected as well. Fearing for the safety of the others, she flees into the catacombs. Jake and Ichabod are able to identify the distinctive symbol of the curse as belonging to a djinn, who uses it to lure victims to its lair and consume their souls. A team of agents led by Samuel Wilson managed to defeat the djinn with a powerful tempest, but only at the cost of Wilson's life. While conducting a ritual with Jenny, Molly has a prophecy of Crane being imprisoned. Jake takes the curse into himself, allowing him to find the djinn's lair. Diana injects Alex with a serum to cure her, and she and Ichabod kill the djinn by electrocuting it, breaking the curse. Dreyfuss informs Jobe that he is forming a "team" of his own, starting with McDonald.
58	9	"Child's Play"	Michael Goi	Francisca X. Hu	March 3, 2017	4AWL09	1.88
Diana learns from Molly's art teacher that her daughter has been struggling in class. To help, the team brings her to the Vault. Dreyfuss sees another vision of the future, one where Molly is his ally. While exploring the catacombs, a disturbance causes the Vault's automatic defense system to lock Ichabod and Molly in. Diana finds the teacher beaten half to death, and a piece of cloth from Molly's blanket. Diana reveals that when Molly was younger, she created an imaginary friend named "Mr. Stitch", which leads Ichabod to conclude that the attacker may be a golem. Alex and Wells find a video recording from a former agent of the Vault, warning them of the costs that come from a life of fighting evil. Mr. Stitch goes after Diana, but leaves to hibernate for the night. Using information recovered from the agent's home, the team sends Molly to deactivate the lockdown protocols. When she tries to find her own way out, however, she is intercepted by Dreyfuss. He explains that she's "special" to him before vanishing. Jenny conducts a ritual to destroy Mr. Stitch, saving Diana's life. Alex finds a hex in Molly's tablet, which she deduces to be the means by which Mr. Stitch was summoned. Dreyfuss shuts down his company and prepares to recruit a new member to his team.
59	10	"Insatiable"	Steven A. Adelson	Keely MacDonald	March 10, 2017	4AWL10	1.74
Dreyfuss invites Helen, the CFO of his former company, to a private retreat, where she is abducted by Jobe. At a party thrown by Ichabod, Alex finds herself uncomfortable with Wells's new girlfriend. Diana goes to her superior for a warrant to investigate Dreyfuss, but is refused. To distract the team, Jobe summons a demon that drives its victims to gluttony before they starve to death, including Diana's superior. Ichabod and Jenny identify the cause of the attacks as a Chinese puzzle box that can summon that particular kind of demon. They find the box in the building's basement, and Jenny is able to summon it back. Unfortunately, the resulting battle destroys the box, and the demon escapes into the city. Diana blames herself for the failure, but Ichabod finds an account left by a survivor of the Donner Party explaining how they used gold to defeat it. The team traps the demon in a ring of cars and expose it to a concentrate of gold, killing it. Jobe uses a pair of scales stolen from the Eisenhower Building to help prepare for a ritual to resurrect the Four Horsemen, using MacDonald and Helen as conduits, with the Headless Horseman as the third. Having realized this, the team recognizes that they alone have the power to stop him.
60	11	"The Way of the Gun"	Russell Fine	Bryan Q. Miller	March 17, 2017	4AWL11	1.82
Through an espionage operation established by Alex and Diana, the team is able to link Dreyfuss to the Arma Mutata, a splinter group of Masons fanatically obsessed with the apocalypse. A mysterious woman breaks into the Vault and steals a tome, overpowering Jenny in the process. Ichabod recalls a mission he undertook with Banneker to hide an unknown item, which he suspects to be a totem that can be used to channel the Horseman of War. At the site, they encounter Jobe, whom the woman is able to chase off. She is subsequently knocked out, and Ichabod recovers the totem. Calling herself Lara, the woman insists the totem be destroyed. Dreyfuss captures Jake and Alex and interrogates them, while Lara ditches Ichabod and Diana. They are able to track her to an eternal flame, where Jobe and Dreyfuss steal the totem back. Lara admits she is from the future, her real name is Molly, and her mother is destined to become the fourth Horseman. However, Ichabod intervenes and takes the bullet for himself, assuming the mantle of War.
61	12	"Tomorrow"	Marc Roskin	Albert Kim	March 24, 2017	4AWL12	1.96
In the future, Jenny leads an underground resistance against Dreyfuss, which is crushed by Lara and the Horsemen, Lara believing that her mother died resisting Dreyfuss in a misguided rebellion, but witnesses her mother behind War's armour when it is damaged in the fight. After confronting Dreyfuss, she locates Crane—who she had long believed had been executed—and learns the truth about her mother. Using the Grand Grimoire, she sends herself back in time to prevent Dreyfuss's rise to power. Upon witnessing Crane becoming War, Diana and Lara flee and return to the Vault. Some of Crane's blood interacts with the dark webbing, allowing Parrish to resurrect himself, albeit much more kind-hearted than the original. He suggests that Katrina's decoupling ritual may be able to save Crane. Someone breaks into the Vault and steals a rare artifact, so Lara and Diana go to retrieve Katrina's books, while Jenny and the others determine that the stolen item is the Draugur Stone, which Jobe uses to revive the Horseman's Hessian followers and send them to attack Sleepy Hollow. Lara enters Crane's mind and convinces him to reject War's power. Using the last of his energy, Crane destroys the Hessians. Parrish meets with Jobe and Dreyfuss and agrees to take his father's place as the Horseman of War.
62	13	"Freedom"	Russell Fine	M. Raven Metzner	March 31, 2017	4AWL13	1.72
Ichabod and Parrish engage in a duel; the whole thing turns out to be a vision conducted by Jenny. Lara confides to Diana that since she cannot return to her own time, she wants to meet Molly once the war is over. Dreyfuss raises the Four Horsemen and has them take the President hostage, and Ichabod determines that the only way to kill him is to remove his immortality. Lara contacts Jobe, who sends her and Ichabod to meet his master Satan in Hell. Diana, Jenny, Alex, and Wells find hidden notes left by Banneker listing several powerful artifacts earmarked for battling supernatural threats, which they recover. Ichabod strikes a deal with Lucifer, receiving a new Philosopher's Stone. The team holds back the Horsemen while he and Diana go to confront Dreyfuss. Parrish, as War, attacks them, but Ichabod persuades him to withdraw from the battle. Diana shoots Dreyfuss, mortally wounding him due to the effects of the new Philosopher's Stone, and Jobe drags him to Hell citing that the former's contract has expired. The President reestablishes Agency 355, making Diana a full agent and granting Ichabod American citizenship. Lara decides not to meet Molly in favor of traveling the world. Ichabod reveals to Diana that he bargained his soul for the Stone, but is confident he will find a way to undo his deal.

== Production ==
=== Casting ===
On July 22, 2016, it was announced that Janina Gavankar had joined the cast in a recurring role as Diana Thomas, Ichabod's new partner. Described as a single mom, and a former military officer who serves as a special agent for Homeland Security. Also cast in a recurring role is former MasterChef Junior contestant Oona Yaffe, who plays Diana's ten-year-old daughter Molly Thomas. Rachel Melvin joined the cast as Alex Norwood, her character has been described as a self-taught engineering prodigy who works alongside Jake Wells (Jerry MacKinnon) in the supernatural archives in Washington D.C. Jeremy Davies joined the cast in a recurring role as villain Malcolm Dreyfuss, a billionaire tech mogul who aspires to conquer other worlds, described as a dark mirror to Ichabod Crane. James Kyson joined the cast as Diana's boss. During the show's New York Comic Con panel on October 9, 2016, it was revealed that John Noble will be returning this season as Henry Parrish / Jeremy Crane; however, it was not revealed on whether he will be recurring or guest-starring in this season. On November 1, 2016, it was announced that Kamar de los Reyes will be starring in a recurring role this season. Robbie Kay was cast in the role of Logan MacDonald on November 23, 2016.

Due to the show changing its setting to Washington, D.C., it was announced that stars Lance Gross who played FBI Agent Daniel Reynolds, and Jessica Camacho who played FBI Agent Sophie Foster in Season 3 would not be returning. However, it was also teased that Camacho might make a few guest appearances in Season 4.

=== Filming ===
Production on the fourth season began on August 15, 2016, in Atlanta, Georgia. On October 11, 2016, it was reported that filming was taking place in the city of Lawrenceville, Georgia; pictures from the set of the show were also shared on social media.

== Reception ==
=== Ratings ===
No. in series	No. in season	Title	Original air date	Time slot (EST)	U.S. Rating/share (18–49)	Viewers (millions)	DVR (18–49)	DVR viewers (millions)	DVR Total (18–49)	Total viewers (millions)
50	1	"Columbia"	January 6, 2017	Friday; 9:00 p.m.	0.6/2	2.19	0.4	1.54	1.0	3.72
51	2	"In Plain Sight"	January 13, 2017	Friday; 9:00 p.m.	0.6/2	2.14	0.4	1.50	1.0	3.64
52	3	"Heads of State"	January 20, 2017	Friday; 9:00 p.m.	0.5/2	1.91	0.5	1.50	1.0	3.41
53	4	"The People vs. Ichabod Crane"	January 27, 2017	Friday; 9:00 p.m.	0.6/2	2.16	0.4	1.31	1.0	3.47
54	5	"Blood from a Stone"	February 3, 2017	Friday; 9:00 p.m.	0.5/2	1.83	0.4	1.44	0.9	3.26
55	6	"Homecoming"	February 10, 2017	Friday; 9:00 p.m.	0.5/2	2.00	0.5	1.42	1.0	3.42
56	7	"Loco Parentis"	February 17, 2017	Friday; 9:00 p.m.	0.5/2	1.82	0.4	1.44	0.9	3.26
57	8	"Sick Burn"	February 24, 2017	Friday; 9:00 p.m.	0.5/2	1.78	0.4	1.39	0.9	3.17
58	9	"Child's Play"	March 3, 2017	Friday; 9:00 p.m.	0.4/1	1.88	—N/a	—N/a	—N/a	—N/a
59	10	"Insatiable"	March 10, 2017	Friday; 9:00 p.m.	0.4/2	1.74	0.5	1.35	0.9	3.09
60	11	"The Way of the Gun"	March 17, 2017	Friday; 9:00 p.m.	0.4/1	1.82	0.4	1.19	0.8	3.00
61	12	"Tomorrow"	March 24, 2017	Friday; 9:00 p.m.	0.5/2	1.96	0.4	1.25	0.9	3.21
62	13	"Freedom"	March 31, 2017	Friday; 9:00 p.m.	0.5/2	1.72	—N/a	1.21	—N/a	2.93
