= Books from Beyond =

- Ash vs Evil Dead episode
- Episode no.: Season 1 Episode 3
- Directed by: Michael J. Bassett
- Written by: Sean Clements
- Cinematography by: John Cavill
- Editing by: Tom Eagles
- Original release date: November 14, 2015
- Running time: 30 minutes

Guest appearances
- Kelson Henderson as Lionel Hawkins; Ben Fransham as Eligos

Episode chronology
← Previous "Bait"	Next → "Brujo"

"Books from Beyond" is the third episode of the first season of the American comedy horror television series Ash vs Evil Dead, which serves as a continuation of the Evil Dead trilogy. The episode was written by producer Sean Clements, and directed by Michael J. Bassett. It originally aired on the premium channel Starz on November 14, 2015.

The series is set 30 years after the events of the Evil Dead trilogy, and follows Ash Williams, who now works at the "Value Stop" as a simple stock boy. Having spent his life not doing anything remarkable since the events of the trilogy, Ash will have to renounce his routine existence and become a hero once more by taking up arms and facing the titular Evil Dead. In the episode, Ash, Pablo and Kelly visit Books from Beyond, hoping to find a way to stop evil.

According to Nielsen Media Research, the episode was seen by an estimated 0.383 million household viewers and gained a 0.16 ratings share among adults aged 18–49. The episodes received positive reviews from critics, who praised the performances, prosthethic makeup, special effects and character development.

== Plot ==
Ruby (Lucy Lawless) drives to the housed owned by the parents of Kelly (Dana DeLorenzo), where she confronts Kelly's Deadite father to know if Ash (Bruce Campbell) was there. The Deadite mocks her and refuses to cooperate, prompting her to torture him by using a special dagger.

Ash, Pablo (Ray Santiago) and Kelly finally arrive at the Books from Beyond bookstore, where Ash asks the owner, Lionel Hawkins (Kelson Henderson), to translate the Necronomicon. However, Amanda (Jill Marie Jones) has already arrived and confronts Ash for the strange events at the town, causing a scared Pablo to knock her unconscious. Lionel states that the Necronomicon was created by the "Dark Ones", beings that planned to use the book to destroy humanity. The book was written with human blood and the pages were the flesh of the damned, using it as a passegeway to the Underworld.

As Lionel can't properly translate the spell to undo everything, Ash asks him to summon the "weakest demon" in the book so he can learn everything he needs. Through a circle, they summon a demon named Eligos (Ben Fransham), whose presence causes the bookstore to tremble. Ash and Pablo need to stay in their limits of the circle to not break it. Eligos is only willing to talk if Ash releases him, which he refuses to do. Amanda, having woken up and convinced Kelly to release her, interrupts the conversation and causes Ash to break the circle. This frees Eligos, who kills Lionel to prevent him from casting him away. Using his powers, Eligos breaks part of Ash's and Pablo's emotional states. Kelly manages to banish Eligos by hitting him with the Necronomicon.

In the aftermath, Amanda tries to arrest Ash, but he manages to handcuff her so they can leave. As Kelly laments trusting Amanda, Ash recalls that the answer to stop evil was "inside" him. Pablo decides that they need to visit his estranged uncle, who is a witch doctor known as "El Brujo". Back in the bookstore, a handcuffed Amanda is shocked when Lionel's corpse is possessed by a Deadite, ready to attack her.

== Production ==
=== Development ===
The episode was written by producer Sean Clements, and directed by Michael J. Bassett. It was Clements' first writing credit, and Bassett's second directorial credit.

== Reception ==
=== Viewers ===
In its original American broadcast, "Books from Beyond" was seen by an estimated 0.383 million household viewers and gained a 0.16 ratings share among adults aged 18–49, according to Nielsen Media Research. This means that 0.16 percent of all households with televisions watched the episode. This was a 38% increase in viewership from the previous episode, which was watched by 0.276 million viewers with a 0.12 in the 18-49 demographics.

=== Critical reviews ===
"Books from Beyond" received positive reviews from critics. Matt Fowler of IGN gave the episode a "great" 8.4 out of 10 rating and wrote in his verdict, "'Books from Beyond' kept the Evil Dead mischief rolling with a less-bloody affair involving a brand new type of demon. It also brought Ash and Amanda together for the first time, though it would not be a fortuitous pairing. And she'd get left behind while the Ghost Beaters headed off to visit Pablo's uncle. Left behind to (unknown to Ash) deal with a possessed version of the shop owner."

Michael Roffman of The A.V. Club gave the episode a "C+" grade and wrote, "After two weeks of hyping Books From Beyond, the titular episode falls flat on its ass from a Melba Toast script and an equally bland sense of direction. To be fair, we've been a little spoiled and every series has its ebbs and flows. The problem is that 'Books From Beyond' is such a flaccid comedown from the splendid chaos that tipped off Ash Vs. Evil Dead. And naturally, the adjustment isn't so easy."

Gina McIntyre of Entertainment Weekly wrote, "Say you've accidentally called forth a powerful, ancient evil. There are a couple of strategies you might employ to set the situation right, but... conjuring a demon to ask for advice? Not a good idea. So, naturally, that's exactly what Ash decides to do." Stephen Harber of Den of Geek wrote, "Although it spends most of its running time fleshing out the bigger picture of Evil Dead and setting up a foggy destination for the first season's master plan, 'Books from Beyond' is a solid episode of a new series that already has a loveable identity."

Carissa Pavlica of TV Fanatic gave the episode a 4 star rating out of 5 and wrote, "If you guys thought the last episode felt like it was short, you must have been pounding your head into your pillows as the credits rolled on 'Books from Beyond'!" Jasef Wisener of TV Overmind wrote, "'Books from Beyond' was another incredible episode of Ash vs. Evil Dead. Action, while present, took more of a backseat than we've seen so far so that the story could progress in a meaningful way, and the in-universe mythology was expanded in a major way." Blair Marnell of Nerdist wrote, "After three episodes, Ash vs. Evil Dead has yet to make a major creative misstep. It's just been hilariously gory fun on a weekly basis."
