= Brujo (Ash vs Evil Dead) =

- Ash vs Evil Dead episode
- Episode no.: Season 1 Episode 4
- Directed by: David Frazee
- Written by: James E. Eagan
- Cinematography by: Dave Garbett
- Editing by: Bryan Shaw
- Original release date: November 21, 2015
- Running time: 30 minutes

Guest appearances
- Hemky Madera as El Brujo; Kelson Henderson as Lionel Hawkins; Ben Fransham as Eligos

Episode chronology
← Previous "Books from Beyond"	Next → "The Host"

"Brujo" is the fourth episode of the first season of the American comedy horror television series Ash vs Evil Dead, which serves as a continuation of the Evil Dead trilogy. The episode was written by James E. Eagan, and directed by David Frazee. It originally aired on the premium channel Starz on November 21, 2015.

The series is set 30 years after the events of the Evil Dead trilogy, and follows Ash Williams, who now works at the "Value Stop" as a simple stock boy. Having spent his life not doing anything remarkable since the events of the trilogy, Ash will have to renounce his routine existence and become a hero once more by taking up arms and facing the titular Evil Dead. In the episode, Ash, Pablo and Kelly visit Pablo's shaman uncle for help.

According to Nielsen Media Research, the episode was seen by an estimated 0.448 million household viewers and gained a 0.20 ratings share among adults aged 18–49. The episode received positive reviews from critics, who praised the episode's originality, character development, and performances, although some criticized the pacing.

== Plot ==
A handcuffed Amanda (Jill Marie Jones) is attacked by Lionel (Kelson Henderson), now a Deadite. However, Ruby (Lucy Lawless) arrives and mortally wounds Lionel before releasing Amanda from her handcuffs. Ruby knows that Amanda is pursuing Ash (Bruce Campbell) and explains she has her own vendetta against him: she claims that Ash killed her parents and her sister Annie at a cabin thirty years ago. (Note: As depicted in Evil Dead II.) They both decide to join forces to catch Ash, just as Ruby kills the Deadite. Ruby also reveals that she is keeping Ash's severed hand, which started moving on its own.

While driving, Ash, Pablo (Ray Santiago) and Kelly (Dana DeLorenzo) are pursued by a Deadite force. They manage to evade it by entering the property of Pablo's uncle, El Brujo (Hemky Madera), who covered the outskirts with talismans to prevent it from entering. El Brujo is in bad terms with Pablo and is not fully convinced by his claim that Ash could be "El Jefe". He decides to test Ash by having him take ayahuasca, a hallucinogenic. After reminiscing about his past, Ash finds himself in his "safe place": Jacksonville, Florida with his hands intact.

Kelly starts to feel sick, forcing Pablo to tend her in Ash's home trailer. Kelly is suddenly possessed by Eligos, and knocks Pablo unconscious. She then has El Brujo distracted and stays alone with Ash in his unconscious state, entering his mind. Back in his hallucination, Ash is visited by his pet lizard Eli, and is also given the Necronomicon, being informed that it must be buried where it started. Ash finds himself back in the cabin, haunted by Eligos. Advised by Eli, Ash confronts Eligos, banishing him. Back in the real, world, Ash attacks the possessed Kelly, strangling her. Pablo and El Brujo arrive, and unaware of her possession, knock Ash unconscious.

== Production ==
=== Development ===
The episode was written by James E. Eagan, and directed by David Frazee. It was Eagan's first writing credit, and Frazee's first directorial credit.

== Reception ==
=== Viewers ===
In its original American broadcast, "Brujo" was seen by an estimated 0.448 million household viewers and gained a 0.20 ratings share among adults aged 18–49, according to Nielsen Media Research. This means that 0.20 percent of all households with televisions watched the episode. This was a 16% increase in viewership from the previous episode, which was watched by 0.383 million viewers with a 0.16 in the 18-49 demographics.

=== Critical reviews ===
"Brujo" received positive reviews from critics. Matt Fowler of IGN gave the episode a "great" 8.2 out of 10 rating and wrote in his verdict, "'Brujo' had a lot of fun parts but with Evil Dead now going episodic and serialized, it may have buckle a bit more under conventional genre rules. The first being, that there are rules and not just non-stop hijinks."

Michael Roffman of The A.V. Club gave the episode a "B" grade and wrote, "After last week's rather claustrophobic 'Books From Beyond', 'Brujo' feels like a breath of fresh air. It doesn't bruise like the first two episodes, and it's at times a little manic, but the dialogue pops, each character has a purpose, and there's a pronounced depth to the story that's just the right kind of hazy."

Gina McIntyre of Entertainment Weekly wrote, "A psychedelic trip takes Ash to his happy place though Kelly isn't feeling like her old self these days." Stephen Harber of Den of Geek wrote, "'Brujo' may not be original in its intent, as it uses a very traditional avenue to explore our favorite character."

Carissa Pavlica of TV Fanatic gave the episode a 4 star rating out of 5 and wrote, "Well, it's a good think Ash has always wanted to visit the city he then created in his head, because after 'Brujo', he's still visiting. Although, I don't think it looked the same once the sausage skin demon was done mucking around." Jasef Wisener of TV Overmind wrote, "'Brujo' was the most flawed episode of Ash vs. Evil Dead yet, but it was still a solid entry in a great show. The comedy here was pretty hit-or-miss, but the franchise mythology continues to expand as series history starts taking a more prominent role than ever before." Blair Marnell of Nerdist wrote, "Four episodes in, Ash vs. Evil Dead may actually be one of my choices for the best new comedy of the year. Campbell always makes me laugh, and his supporting cast has also been excellent. Even the guest stars like Madera have been well cast, and Eligos has the makings of a great villain. That’s more than enough to keep me coming back."
