= Sleepy Hollow (TV series) =

American supernatural drama television series

- Genre: Drama; Horror; Action; Procedural
- Created by: Alex Kurtzman; Roberto Orci; Phillip Iscove; Len Wiseman
- Based on: "The Legend of Sleepy Hollow" by Washington Irving
- Starring: Tom Mison; Nicole Beharie; Orlando Jones; Katia Winter; Lyndie Greenwood; John Noble; Nikki Reed; Shannyn Sossamon; Zach Appelman; Lance Gross; Jessica Camacho; Janina Gavankar; Jerry MacKinnon; Rachel Melvin; Oona Yaffe; Jeremy Davies
- Opening theme: Brian Tyler
- Ending theme: Brian Tyler
- Composers: Robert Lydecker; Brian Tyler
- Country of origin: United States
- Original language: English
- No. of seasons: 4
- No. of episodes: 62 (list of episodes)

Production
- Executive producers: Alex Kurtzman; Roberto Orci; Len Wiseman; Heather Kadin; Mark Goffman; Ken Olin; Clifton Campbell; Albert Kim; Damian Kindler
- Producers: Clayton Townsend; Melissa Blake; Neal Ahern Jr.; Kristen Reidel; Phil Laudicina; Marc David Alpert; Jane Bartelme; Heather V. Regnier; Leigh Dana Jackson; Shernold Edwards
- Production locations: Wilmington, North Carolina; New Bern, North Carolina; Atlanta, Georgia
- Cinematography: Tod Campbell; John R. Leonetti; Kramer Morgenthau; Bing Sokolsky
- Editors: Andrew Coutts; Scott Gamzon; John Refoua; Michael Stern
- Running time: 41–43 minutes
- Production companies: Mark Goffman Productions; Sketch Films; K/O Paper Products; 20th Century Fox Television

Original release
- Network: Fox
- Release: September 16, 2013 – March 31, 2017

Sleepy Hollow is an American supernatural drama television series that aired on Fox from September 16, 2013, to March 31, 2017. The series is loosely based on the 1820 short story "The Legend of Sleepy Hollow", by Washington Irving, with added concepts from "Rip Van Winkle", also by Irving. The first three seasons are set in a fictionalized version of Sleepy Hollow, New York, which portrays the town as much larger than it actually is. For the fourth and final season, the setting moved to Washington, D.C.

In October 2013, Sleepy Hollow was renewed for a second season with 13 episodes. The season was extended to 18 episodes in May 2014. Early in March 2015, after the second season, Sleepy Hollow showrunner Mark Goffman left the series. On March 18, 2015, Fox renewed Sleepy Hollow for an 18-episode third season, with a new showrunner, Clifton Campbell, taking over.

On May 13, 2016, Fox renewed the show for a fourth season, which premiered on January 6, 2017. Albert Kim, previously an executive producer on the series, was named co-showrunner for the fourth season. On May 9, 2017, the show was canceled after four seasons.

== Summary ==
In 1781, Ichabod Crane shot a Horseman between his left shoulder and his chest, which seems not to affect him. He does not die. The horseman, wearing an iron mask, brandishes his axe and severely wounds Ichabod in the chest. In desperation, Crane beheads him. Both fall, dead, side by side. Crane next awakens in 2013 Sleepy Hollow, with Washington's Bible to guide him. He meets Sheriff's Lt. Abigail Mills (Abbie) and learns that the Horseman has also returned. Crane learns that he and Abbie are the two Witnesses of Revelation, and the Horseman is Death. Should he regain his severed head, his master, Moloch, would be released from Purgatory and the End of Days would occur. Crane also learns that his wife, Katrina, a witch, was banished to Purgatory for saving him. His blunder has linked his life with the Horseman's. Fighting off Moloch's army of demons, Crane discovers that the Horseman of War is his own son, Jeremy Crane/Henry Parish, who loathes Crane and Katrina for abandoning him. Crane also learns that "Headless" is actually his former friend, Abraham Von Brunt.

Crane and Abbie manage to defeat Moloch, but at the cost of releasing everything trapped in Purgatory, including demons looking for a replacement for Moloch. Henry convinces Katrina to side with him and awaken the descendants of their coven, but both are killed by Crane, who is filled with regret and remorse.

In the following months, Crane investigates all myths about the Witnesses, learning that Moloch was the first of Seven Tribulations. The second comes in the form of Pandora and her master, the Hidden One, an ancient Sumerian god. Because Moloch is dead (and thus cannot end the world), Crane gives the Horseman back his head, allowing him to destroy Pandora. However, the head is sucked into Pandora's box, which is destroyed. This battle costs Abigail her soul. Learning that there will always be two Witnesses, Crane vows to find her replacement and face the last five Tribulations.

Relocating to Washington D.C., Crane discovers that the next Witness is a young girl named Molly. Crane works with her mother, Agent Diana Thomas of Homeland Security, to combat supernatural threats until Molly is old enough to help. Crane also allies with Agency 355 agents Jake Wells and Alex Norwood, taking command of the organization as George Washington wished.

The third tribulation comes in the form of Malcolm Dreyfuss, who sold his soul to build his business. Dreyfuss seeks immortality for he fears death. After Dreyfuss becomes immortal, he decides to assemble the Four Horsemen, kill the President and take over the United States of America. A woman named Lara arrives from the future that Dreyfuss wishes to create, revealing herself to be an alternate version of young Molly. Because she is in her prime, Lara takes the Witness title from Molly, releasing her past self from the burden. Crane is forced to make a deal with the devil for a piece of the philosophers' stone that will strip Dreyfuss of his immortality and send him to Hell.

While Lara goes on a journey to discover her place in the world, Crane continues working with Agent Thomas to combat supernatural threats, hoping that he can someday escape his bargain with the devil.

== Cast and characters ==
- Tom Mison as Ichabod Crane, Esq., soldier of the American Revolutionary War and Biblical witness. Ichabod Crane also acts as both a Sheriff's consultant and an FBI consultant whilst working with Mills.
- Nicole Beharie as Abbie Mills, Sheriff's Lieutenant, FBI Agent and Biblical witness (seasons 1–3)
- Orlando Jones as Frank Irving, Sheriff's Captain (seasons 1–2)
- Katia Winter as Katrina Crane, a witch (seasons 1–2)
- Lyndie Greenwood as Jenny Mills, artifact hunter (seasons 2–4; recurring season 1)
- John Noble as Henry Parish/Jeremy Crane, the son of Ichabod and Katrina, and the Horseman of War (season 2; recurring season 1, guest season 4)
- Matt Barr as Nick Hawley, a mercenary dealing with the supernatural (season 2)
- Nikki Reed as Betsy Ross, soldier of the revolutionary war (season 3)
- Shannyn Sossamon as Pandora, a supernatural entity (season 3)
- Zach Appelman as Joseph Corbin, E.M.T., artifact hunter and Wendigo (season 3; guest season 2)
- Lance Gross as Daniel Reynolds, FBI Agent (season 3)
- Jessica Camacho as Sophie Foster, FBI Agent (season 3)
- Janina Gavankar as Diana Thomas, Homeland Security Agent (season 4)
- Jerry MacKinnon as Jake Wells, research analyst at Agency 355 and The Vault (season 4)
- Rachel Melvin as Alex Norwood, engineer at Agency 355 and The Vault (season 4)
- Oona Yaffe as Molly Thomas, Diana's 11-year-old daughter, and Biblical witness (season 4)
- Jeremy Davies as Malcolm Dreyfuss, a billionaire tech mogul, who is seeking out mystical artifacts (season 4)

== Development and production ==
The pilot episode was filmed in Gastonia, Salisbury, and Charlotte, North Carolina.

The rest of the first season and the second season were filmed in Wilmington, North Carolina. The third and fourth seasons were filmed in Conyers and Lawrenceville, Georgia, in the metro Atlanta area.

Aerial footage for the series is filmed over the actual village of Sleepy Hollow and the surrounding Tappan Zee region of New York.

== Episodes ==
Season	Episodes	Originally released	
Season	Episodes	First released	Last released
1	13	September 16, 2013	January 20, 2014
2	18	September 22, 2014	February 23, 2015
3	18	October 1, 2015	April 8, 2016
4	13	January 6, 2017	March 31, 2017

== Broadcast ==
Sleepy Hollow airs simultaneously on Global in Canada. For the third season, the show moved to CTV Two. In India, the series premiered on September 24, 2013, on Star World Premiere, where it ran for the first three seasons before moving to the network's sister-channel, Star World, for the final season.

In Australia, the series premiered on September 17, 2013, on Network Ten. The series was moved to Eleven on January 13, 2014. In the United Kingdom and Ireland, the series was acquired by the Universal Channel, which premiered it on October 9, 2013. The second season debuted on October 15, 2014 and the third season debuted on October 22, 2015. Season 4 premiere on Syfy February 22, 2017.

In South Africa, the second season began airing on M-Net Edge alongside the network's launch on October 20, 2014. In Thailand, the series aired on Channel 3 every Thursday night starting November 26, 2015.

By mid-year, Ion Television acquired syndication rights for the Fox series and was broadcast on June 6, 2017. As of July 2020, it ceased running on Ion Television and currently airs on syndication on AMC and Bravo.

== Reception ==
Sleepy Hollow has received generally favorable reviews from critics. On Rotten Tomatoes, the first season holds a rating of 77%, based on 44 reviews, with an average rating of 6.6/10. The site's critical consensus reads, "Despite its overstuffed plot, Sleepy Hollow is a fun romp with exciting action scenes and sparkling production values." On Metacritic the first season has a score of 64 out of 100, based on 29 critics, indicating "generally favorable reviews".

Verne Gay of Newsday commented that although there is "nothing scary here", the show is "fun enough". Robert Bianco of USA Today gave the show 3 out of 4 stars. Entertainment Weekly, which originally doubted the premise of the show, gave the show a B+ after seeing the first half of the first season, citing the Crane & Mills' chemistry and the show's surprisingly fun mythology. Time called Sleepy Hollow one of 2013's Ten Best new shows.

The series premiered on September 16, 2013, to 10 million viewers with 3.5 rating/9 share which was double the amount that Fox's The Mob Doctor brought in at the same time last year and marked the network's highest rated fall drama premiere since the 2006 police drama Standoff. In Australia the first episode had 597,000 viewers and in the United Kingdom the same episode had 527,000 viewers.

In the actual Sleepy Hollow, New York, the local newspaper has enumerated the many fictions told about the village, including its labyrinth of Revolutionary-era tunnels and the increase in population (from an actual 2010 census of 9,870 to roughly 144,000 reported in the show).

On Rotten Tomatoes season two has a rating of 100% based on 15 reviews. The consensus reads, "Sleepy Hollow continues to pack a punch in its sophomore season, with fantastic writing and lots of chills." Season three had a rating of 55% based on 11 reviews, with the observation, "(The) third season retains …the invaluable chemistry between leads Tom Mison and Nicole Beharie, but this go-around shows signs of strain as it attempts to further flesh out a mythology that isn't substantial enough for viewers to lose their heads over."

=== Ratings ===
Viewership and ratings per season of Sleepy Hollow
Season	Timeslot (ET)	Episodes	First aired		Last aired		TV season	Viewership rank	Avg. viewers (millions)
Season	Timeslot (ET)	Episodes	Date	Viewers (millions)	Date	Viewers (millions)	TV season	Viewership rank	Avg. viewers (millions)
1	Monday 9:00pm	13	September 16, 2013	10.10	January 20, 2014	7.05	2013–14	38	8.60
2	Monday 9:00pm	18	September 22, 2014	5.51	February 23, 2015	4.35	2014–15	92	6.12
3	Thursday 9:00pm (1–8); Friday 8:00pm (9–18)	18	October 1, 2015	3.46	April 8, 2016	2.96	2015–16	99	4.82
4	Friday 9:00pm	13	January 6, 2017	2.19	March 31, 2017	1.72	2016–17	123	3.29

=== Awards and nominations ===
Year	Association	Category	Nominee	Result
2014	NAACP Image Awards	Outstanding Actress in a Drama Series	Nicole Beharie	Nominated
2014	NAACP Image Awards	Outstanding Writing in a Dramatic Series	Chitra Elizabeth Sampath	Nominated
2014	People's Choice Awards	Best New TV Drama	Sleepy Hollow	Nominated
2014	Saturn Awards	Best Network Television Series	Sleepy Hollow	Nominated
2014	TCA Awards	Outstanding New Program	Sleepy Hollow	Nominated
2014	2014 Teen Choice Awards	Choice Sci-Fi/Fantasy TV Show	Sleepy Hollow	Nominated
2014	2014 Teen Choice Awards	Choice Breakout Show	Sleepy Hollow	Nominated
2015	Fangoria Chainsaw Awards	Favorite Actress on Television	Nicole Beharie	Nominated
2015	NAACP Image Awards	Outstanding Actress in a Drama Series	Nicole Beharie	Nominated
2015	Satellite Awards	Best Television Series – Genre	Sleepy Hollow	Nominated
2015	Saturn Awards	Best Network Television Series	Sleepy Hollow	Nominated
2017	Costume Designers Guild Awards	Outstanding Fantasy Television Series	Mairi Chisholm	Nominated

== Other media ==
=== Crossover with Bones ===
Sleepy Hollow had a crossover with the eleventh season episode of fellow Fox series Bones, "The Resurrection in the Remains", and concluded with the former's third-season episode "Dead Men Tell No Tales".

=== Books ===
Two official tie-in books were released in September 2014. The Secret Journal of Ichabod Crane, written by Alex Irvine, is an in-universe journal covering the events of the first season from Crane's perspective. Sleepy Hollow: Children of the Revolution, a novel written by Keith R. A. DeCandido, is set between episodes ten and eleven of the series.

=== Comics ===
Boom! Studios released two comic book limited series from 2014 to 2015, Sleepy Hollow and Sleepy Hollow: Providence, and a one-shot Sleepy Hollow: Origins comic.

== Home media ==
DVD name	Ep #	Release date
Sleepy Hollow Season 1	13	September 16, 2014
Sleepy Hollow Season 2	18	September 15, 2015
Sleepy Hollow Season 3	18	January 3, 2017
Sleepy Hollow Season 4	13	September 26, 2017
Sleepy Hollow Season 1–4	62	September 26, 2017
