= El Jefe (Ash vs Evil Dead) =

- Ash vs Evil Dead episode
- Episode no.: Season 1 Episode 1
- Directed by: Sam Raimi
- Written by: Sam Raimi; Ivan Raimi; Tom Spezialy
- Cinematography by: Dave Garbett
- Editing by: Bob Murawski
- Original release date: October 31, 2015
- Running time: 41 minutes

Guest appearances
- Damien Garvey as Mr. Roper; Mike David as Detective John Carson; Sian Davis as Vivian Johnson; Marissa Stott as Tattoo Girl; Jennifer Freed as Woman in Bar; Bridget Hoffman as Little Lori; Phil Peleton as Kelly's Father; Shara Connolly as TV Reporter; Brian Satterfield as Bartender; James Gaylyn as Waiter; Matilda Garbett as Girl in Diner

Episode chronology
← Previous —	Next → "Bait"

"El Jefe" is the series premiere of the American comedy horror television series Ash vs Evil Dead, which serves as a continuation of the Evil Dead trilogy, the first episodes of its first season. The episode was written by Sam Raimi, Ivan Raimi and Tom Spezialy, and directed by Sam Raimi. It originally aired on the premium channel Starz on October 31, 2015.

The series is set 30 years after the events of the Evil Dead trilogy, and follows Ash Williams, who now works at the "Value Stop" as a simple stock boy. Having spent his life not doing anything remarkable since the events of the trilogy, Ash will have to renounce his routine existence and become a hero once more by taking up arms and facing the titular Evil Dead.

According to Nielsen Media Research, the episode was seen by an estimated 0.437 million household viewers and gained a 0.13 ratings share among adults aged 18–49. The series premiere received extremely positive reviews from critics, who praised the series as "fun", also highlighting Campbell's performance and Raimi's directing as strong points.

== Plot ==
Approximately 30 years after returning from 1300 AD, (Note: As depicted in Army of Darkness (1992).) Ash Williams (Bruce Campbell) now lives in a home trailer. He goes to a local bar, where he has sex with a woman in the restroom. During the act, the woman's face turns into a demon vintage for a brief moment, disturbing Ash. He returns to his trailer, he recalls a memory where he smoked marijuana with a prostitute and then proceeded to read the Necronomicon as a "poetry read", making him realize he unleashed demonic forces into the world.

Michigan state police detective Amanda Fisher (Jill Marie Jones) and her partner, detective John Carson (Mike Edward) investigate a disturbance at an abandoned house. Inside, they encounter a possessed woman, who stabs Amanda in her hand with scissors and kills Carson by hanging him from antlers. Amanda kills the woman by shooting her head off, and discovers her partner is now undead, forcing her to kill him as well. The event causes Amanda to start seeing undead people. She tries to dismiss this, although a mysterious woman named Ruby (Lucy Lawless) is convinced that she is seeing undead people.

The next day, Ash sets up a meeting with Lionel Hawkins, owner of an occult bookstore. Before meeting him, he goes to his job at a Value Stop department store for his paycheck but is denied early pay until the end of the day. Ash's co-worker, Pablo (Ray Santiago), wants to hang out with Ash, who appreciates him but claims he needs to leave town. Unwilling to let him go alone, Pablo refers him to their colleague, Kelly (Dana DeLorenzo), to help him. Ash tries to flirt with her, but she rebuffs his advances. While alone in the warehouse, Ash is attacked by a possessed doll, who tries to kill him with a box cutter. Before she stabs him, Pablo kills the doll.

Ash explains his past to Pablo, saying he is leaving town to fix his mistake of reading the Necronomicon. Pablo also states that his uncle, a shaman known as "El Brujo", warned about the presence of the Devil. His uncle also spoke about a person who would stop evil, known as "El Jefe". Pablo is convinced that Ash is "El Jefe" but Ash rejects that notion. Ash leaves the store just as a storm is approaching the town. Kelly finds that her father has been visited by her deceased mother and sets out with Pablo on his motorcycle to leave. They leave the store just as a Deadite force possesses their manager.

Pablo takes Kelly to Ash's trailer, who once again refuses to hear his claims. Ash's neighbor turns out to be possessed and attempts to grab Kelly. Finally accepting he must return to his old life, Ash cuts his arm with an axe and then kills his neighbor with his shotgun. As he prepares to take his chainsaw, Ash's old neighbor, Vivian (Sian Davis), appear, possessed as well. She wounds Ash, stabs Pablo with a knife on the shoulder, and prepares to stab Kelly's eyes. Ash regains his chainsaw, beheading Vivian and saving Kelly. Ash finally accepts his role and prepares to fix everything. When Pablo asks how does he feel to be back, Ash replies "Groovy".

== Production ==
=== Development ===
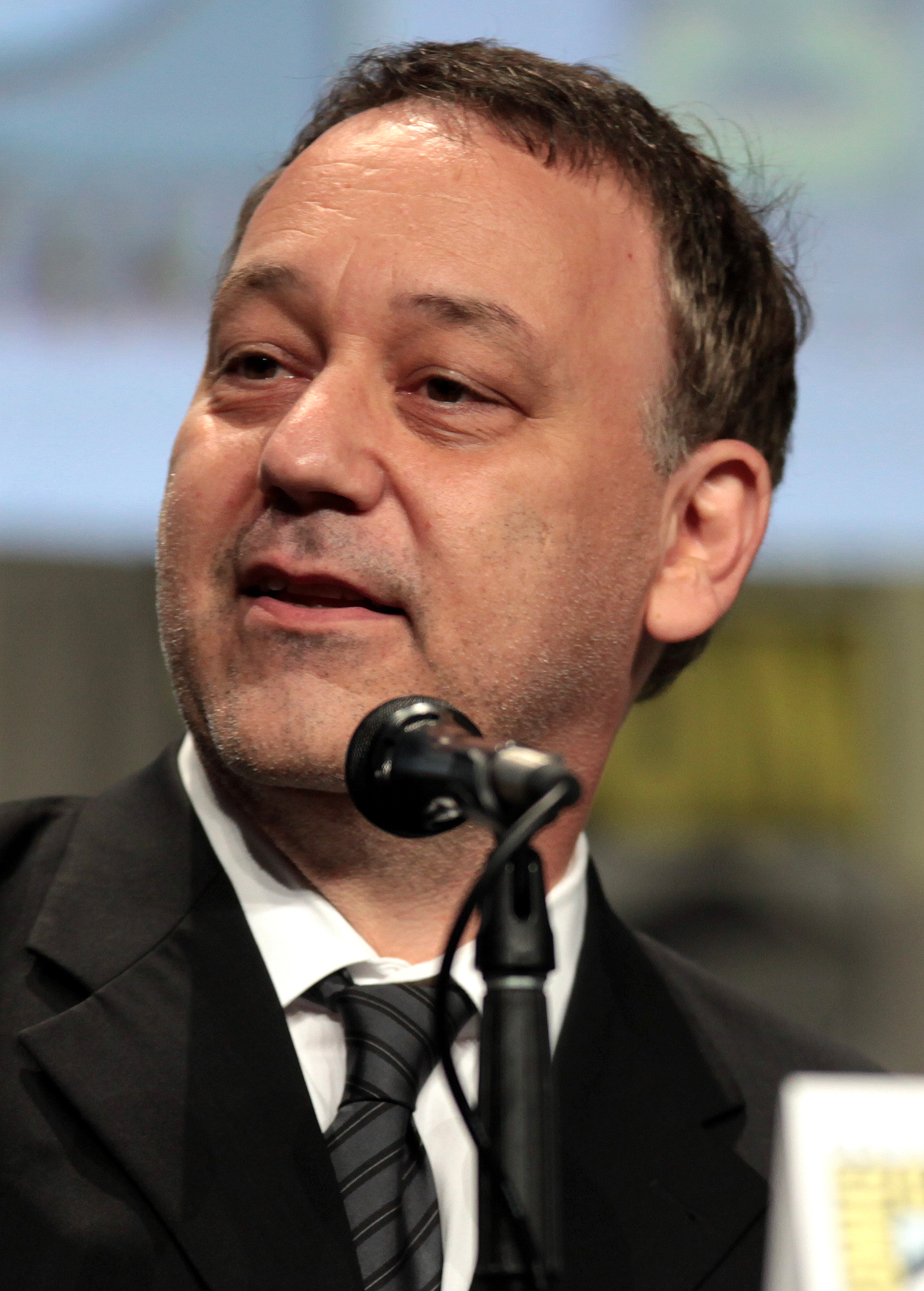
Sam Raimi, creator of the Evil Dead franchise, co-wrote and directed the episode.

The project originally began as a fourth Evil Dead film, before Sam Raimi and Bruce Campbell settled for a TV series. The series was announced in July 2014 at the 2014 San Diego Comic-Con, with Starz ordering the series in November 2014.

The episode was written by Sam Raimi, Ivan Raimi and Tom Spezialy, and directed by Sam Raimi.

== Reception ==
=== Viewers ===
In its original American broadcast, "El Jefe" was seen by an estimated 0.437 million household viewers and gained a 0.13 ratings share among adults aged 18–49, according to Nielsen Media Research. This means that 0.13 percent of all households with televisions watched the episode.

=== Critical reviews ===
"El Jefe" received extremely positive reviews from critics. Matt Fowler of IGN gave the episode a "great" 8.5 out of 10 rating and wrote in his verdict, "Ash vs Evil Dead works to update (and even mature) the beloved goofy horror franchise while embracing Bruce Campbell's wicked ability to play a lovable loser besieged on all sides by darkness and demons. Ferocious Halloween fun."

Michael Roffman of The A.V. Club gave the episode an "A-" grade and wrote, "'El Jefe' does a lot of world building within its manic 40 minutes. Yet Raimi, his older brother Ivan, and veteran TV scribe Tom Spezialy make every second count with a resourceful script that dutifully checks off its laundry list of dire needs, specifically: 1) reuniting a legion of fans with an iconic character, 2) properly introducing tolerable new characters, 3) finding that testy mix of horror, suspense, and comedy, and 4) creating a desire for more."

Gina McIntyre of Entertainment Weekly wrote, "As hard as it might be to believe, it's really true. Bruce Campbell has reclaimed his boomstick, once again playing wise-cracking demon slayer Ash Williams for director Sam Raimi in Starz' new series, Ash Vs. Evil Dead." Gabriel Bergmoser of Den of Geek wrote, "Ash Vs Evil Dead has made a promising, if imperfect, start that despite leaving plenty of questions still manages to be a satisfying slice of gleeful carnage."

Carissa Pavlica of TV Fanatic gave the episode a 4.5 star rating out of 5 and wrote, "With more air time than movies could ever allow and a second season on the way, fans of the original films will be overjoyed and the new material offers first time viewers a great starting point. With Ash vs Evil Dead, Starz has given the cool kids a reason to stay in on a Saturday night." Jasef Wisener of TV Overmind wrote, "'El Jefe' did a solid job at introducing the Evil Dead to those that may not be very familiar with it while still offering enough fun, gore, and humor to hook more diehard fans from the start." Blair Marnell of Nerdist wrote, "While the remaining episodes of Ash vs. Evil Dead will be closer to a half-hour in length, the series premiere benefited from the extra time and it was on par with Raimi's feature film work. I expected Ash vs. Evil Dead to be good, and it far exceeded my expectations. This was a great way to kick off the series. And now that we know that a second season is already lined up, Ash's new adventures are only just beginning."
