= Fire in the Hole (Ash vs Evil Dead) =

- Ash vs Evil Dead episode
- Episode no.: Season 1 Episode 7
- Directed by: Michael Hurst
- Written by: Sean Clements; Dominic Dierkes; Ivan Raimi
- Cinematography by: John Cavill
- Editing by: Allanah Bazzard
- Original release date: December 12, 2015
- Running time: 28 minutes

Guest appearances
- Peter Feeney as Lem; Mark Mitchinson as Crosby; Mike Estes as Austin; Milo Cawthorne as Delmont; Jordan Mooney as Lance; Andrew Norman as Dying Male

Episode chronology
← Previous "The Killer of Killers"	Next → "Ashes to Ashes"

"Fire in the Hole" is the seventh episode of the first season of the American comedy horror television series Ash vs Evil Dead, which serves as a continuation of the Evil Dead trilogy. The episode was written by producer Sean Clements, producer Dominic Dierkes and co-creator Ivan Raimi, and directed by Michael Hurst. It originally aired on the premium channel Starz on December 12, 2015.

The series is set 30 years after the events of the Evil Dead trilogy, and follows Ash Williams, who now works at the "Value Stop" as a simple stock boy. Having spent his life not doing anything remarkable since the events of the trilogy, Ash will have to renounce his routine existence and become a hero once more by taking up arms and facing the titular Evil Dead. In the episode, Ash, Pablo, Kelly and Amanda are captured by militiamen, convinced that they are government agents, just as a possessed Lem attacks the group.

According to Nielsen Media Research, the episode was seen by an estimated 0.452 million household viewers and gained a 0.18 ratings share among adults aged 18–49. The episode received positive reviews from critics, who praised the action sequences, character development and ending.

== Plot ==
Ash (Bruce Campbell), Pablo (Ray Santiago), Kelly (Dana DeLorenzo) and Amanda (Jill Marie Jones) arrive at the woods to meet with the militiamen, only to find some of them have already been brutally killed by Deadites. They are taken by the surviving militiamen and taken to their leader, Crosby (Mark Mitchinson), who reveals that a possessed Lem (Peter Feeney) was responsible for their deaths.

At their base, some of the militiamen attack Lem outside. During the commotion, Pablo and Kelly escape the base, but Ash and Amanda are handcuffed and thrown into a bunker. Amanda apologizes to Ash for believing he was responsible, explaining that Ruby (Lucy Lawless) paid the price for her actions. Back in Brujo's ranch, a naked Ruby rises from the pyre, determined to continue her search for Ash. She reaches the road diner to retrieve her car and drive off.

While Ash and Amanda are pursued by Lem inside the bunker, the militiamen hunt Pablo and Kelly, believing that they are government agents. They eventually catch Pablo and Kelly, but a Deadite possesses a soldier, who kills the militiamen and tries to kill Pablo and Kelly. Despite being handcuffed, Pablo manages to mortally wound the Deadite with a car. However, the Deadite is still alive and tries to kill Pablo, until he is gunned down by Kelly. They then intercept Crosby and his crew, targeting them with their newly acquired weapons.

Back in the bunker, the possessed Lem attacks Ash and Amanda with a flare. Together, Ash and Amanda manage to kill Lem by stabbing him in the head with an axe. Ash and Amanda are about to kiss when Pablo and Kelly arrive to rescue them from the bunker. Outside, Pablo, Kelly and Amanda kill a Deadite in front of the militiamen, finally convincing them of their intentions. They leave the base with new weapons, where Ash tells them he appreciates them. As they start walking, they notice that Ash has vanished. Somewhere in the woods, Ash's severed hand is seen approaching the cabin.

== Production ==
=== Development ===
The episode was written by producer Sean Clements, producer Dominic Dierkes and co-creator Ivan Raimi, and directed by Michael Hurst. It was Clements' second writing credit, Dierkes' second writing credit, Raimi's second writing credit, and Hurst's second directorial credit.

== Reception ==
=== Viewers ===
In its original American broadcast, "Fire in the Hole" was seen by an estimated 0.452 million household viewers and gained a 0.18 ratings share among adults aged 18–49, according to Nielsen Media Research. This means that 0.18 percent of all households with televisions watched the episode. This was a slight increase in viewership from the previous episode, which was watched by 0.402 million viewers with a 0.19 in the 18-49 demographics.

=== Critical reviews ===
"Fire in the Hole" received positive reviews from critics. Matt Fowler of IGN gave the episode a "great" 8.3 out of 10 rating and wrote in his verdict, "Like last week's chapter, 'Fire in the Hole' had some great, gory action. The show is struggling a little bit to find Ash's new balance between caring and cretin, but the final moment here - where Ash left his new friends behind - worked really well."

Michael Roffman of The A.V. Club gave the episode a "B" grade and wrote, "Subtlety isn't a strong suit of Ash Vs. Evil Dead. As we've learned, if there's a meat slicer or a busted pipe nearby, it's going to be used in the bloodiest possible way. This isn't a fault of the series, it's a necessary evil of traditional storytelling, no pun intended. As Anton Chekhov advised over a century ago, 'One must never place a loaded rifle on the stage if it isn't going to go off. It's wrong to make promises you don't mean to keep.' [...] In this particular quote, Chekhov's criticizing a superfluous monologue of a friend's play, arguing that it's unrelated. So, why the hell are we talking about a Russian playwright? Because sometimes the 'gun' can backfire and that's exactly what happens in 'Fire In The Hole.'"

Gina McIntyre of Entertainment Weekly wrote, "Hmmm... A gang of heroes battling an enclave of gun crazed military men ready for the apocalypse? Did Ash somehow wander into an episode of The Walking Dead? It would be easy to assume so, except for all the flippant one-liners and Ash's tortured attempts to hit on Amanda." Stephen Harber of Den of Geek gave the episode a 2 star rating out of 5 and wrote, "Despite being mostly filler, this episode of Ash vs Evil Dead has a higher purpose that's not that obvious until the end. It's really a graduation ceremony for the supporting cast we've accumulated over the past six episodes."

Carissa Pavlica of TV Fanatic gave the episode a 4.75 star rating out of 5 and wrote, "This was probably the most well thought out and meaningful episode so far. I'd hate for the gang to stay split up for long, and I suspect Amanda has the names of the victims and can quite easily find the cabin, so leaving them behind was more for dramatic effect than anything else." Jasef Wisener of TV Overmind wrote, "'Fire in the Hole' was no better or worse than any other episode of this season of Ash vs. Evil Dead, but I mean that in an entirely positive way." Blair Marnell of Nerdist wrote, "This show needs villains who can present a real threat to its heroes, and Ash vs. Evil Dead has done a pretty good job of that so far."
