= Bait (Ash vs Evil Dead) =

- Ash vs Evil Dead episode
- Episode no.: Season 1 Episode 2
- Directed by: Michael J. Bassett
- Written by: Dominic Dierkes
- Cinematography by: John Cavill
- Editing by: Tom Eagles
- Original release date: November 7, 2015
- Running time: 30 minutes

Guest appearances
- Mimi Rogers as Suzy Maxwell; Damien Garvey as Mr. Roper; Phil Peleton as Kelly's Father; Andrew Grainger as Lieutenant Boyle; Jacque Drew as June; Joseph Wycoff as Phil; Zhi Wen Gong as Sketch Artist

Episode chronology
← Previous "El Jefe"	Next → "Books from Beyond"

"Bait" is the second episode of the first season of the American comedy horror television series Ash vs Evil Dead, which serves as a continuation of the Evil Dead trilogy. The episode was written by producer Dominic Dierkes, and directed by Michael J. Bassett. It originally aired on the premium channel Starz on November 7, 2015.

The series is set 30 years after the events of the Evil Dead trilogy, and follows Ash Williams, who now works at the "Value Stop" as a simple stock boy. Having spent his life not doing anything remarkable since the events of the trilogy, Ash will have to renounce his routine existence and become a hero once more by taking up arms and facing the titular Evil Dead. In the episode, Ash and Pablo are forced to get Kelly to her father's house, where her deceased mother has appeared, alive.

According to Nielsen Media Research, the episode was seen by an estimated 0.276 million household viewers and gained a 0.12 ratings share among adults aged 18–49. The episode received extremely positive reviews from critics, with critics praising the performances, action sequences, and humor.

== Plot ==
Ash (Bruce Campbell) decides that he needs to visit Lionel Hawkins to translate the Necronomicon and stop the Deadites from returning. However, Kelly (Dana DeLorenzo) wants to save her father, who just got visited by her dead mother. When Ash refuses, Kelly abandons him and Pablo (Ray Santiago), taking the Necronomicon with her. Ash is forced to follow her along with Pablo, taking his trailer home with them.

During the road, Ash and Pablo are attacked by Mr. Roper (Damien Garvey), now a Deadite. After fighting in the car, Ash manages to behead him. Arriving at Kelly's father's house, they find her, her father (Phil Peleton) and her mother Suzy (Mimi Rogers) alive. Suzy acts normal and has no recollection of her death, claiming she had amnesia. Ash is not convinced by her story, and is even more upset when Pablo reveals that he was the one who took the Necronomicon so they could get Kelly back. Meanwhile, Amanda (Jill Marie Jones) investigates the attack at the home trailer, where she starts to believe that Ash is involved behind the recent events at the town.

During dinner, Ash tries to provoke Suzy by punching her, which only causes Kelly and her father to scold him. However, Suzy turns into a Deadite and kills Kelly's father with a fork. Ash fights her until she hides in the house. Kelly locks herself in her room, where she finds Suzy in her normal body, crying. Ash and Pablo enter the room, intending to kill her, despite Kelly's pleas that her mother is fighting the possession. Suzy once again turns into a Deadite and attacks the team. Pablo stabs her in the head, but she becomes aggressive and prepares to kill them, until Ash uses his chainsaw to behead her.

After burying her parents in the garden, Kelly swears she will avenge their deaths. She accepts Pablo's suggestion to join them in fighting evil, and the three drive off in Ash's car. Somewhere, Amanda arrives at the Books from Beyond location.

== Production ==
=== Development ===
The episode was written by producer Dominic Dierkes, and directed by Michael J. Bassett.

=== Casting ===
In May 2015, Mimi Rogers was announced to guest star in the series as Suzy Maxwell, Kelly's mother.

== Reception ==
=== Viewers ===
In its original American broadcast, "Bait" was seen by an estimated 0.276 million household viewers and gained a 0.12 ratings share among adults aged 18–49, according to Nielsen Media Research. This means that 0.12 percent of all households with televisions watched the episode. This was a 37% decrease in viewership from the previous episode, which was watched by 0.437 million viewers with a 0.13 in the 18-49 demographics.

=== Critical reviews ===
"Bait" received extremely positive reviews from critics. Matt Fowler of IGN gave the episode a "great" 8.4 out of 10 rating and wrote in his verdict, "'Bait' was pretty much the grand experiment as far as the Evil Dead-verse goes. As the first-ever Ash adventure not directed by Sam Raimi, the show proved that the blockhead character and over-the-top tone could endure a changing of the guard. The next test ahead will be an episode not written by Raimi. 'Bait' also gave us one of the most defined Deadites to date in Mimi Rogers' Suzy, making me wonder if a 'boss' type demon might do well on a show like this. Army of Darkness dabbled with it by using the 'Deadite Captain' - aka Bad Ash back from the grave - so perhaps this element should return."

Michael Roffman of The A.V. Club gave the episode a "B+" grade and wrote, "'That, my friends, is how we do it', Ashley 'Ash' Williams declares at the start of this week's episode, 'Bait'. Standing over the ragged, headless corpse of last week's Top Deadite, Vivian Johnson, our hero couldn't appear more determined, more pleased, more assured. Yet it's almost as if he's speaking on behalf of Sam Raimi, Robert Tapert, or anyone else involved in the production of Ash Vs. Evil Dead. Because after that bloody spectacular pilot episode, they've earned the right to be so bold. And let's be real, it's not like fans weren't thinking or saying the exact same thing."

Gina McIntyre of Entertainment Weekly wrote, "In tonight’s installment of Ash Vs. Evil Dead, it's Bruce Campbell's Ash who's come to dinner with Kelly's parents, including Mom, newly back from the dead. And you'd better believe there are some unappetizing items on the menu (fork in the eye anyone?)." Stephen Harber of Den of Geek wrote, "While 'Bait' is a fun and satisfying follow-up to what is arguably the best series premiere of any revival seen thus far, it loses most of the deliciously frantic momentum its predecessor indulged in."

Carissa Pavlica of TV Fanatic gave the episode a 4.5 star rating out of 5 and wrote, "These episodes sure do feel short, don't they? Then again, like a good meal, they satisfy the appetite without stuffing you full. That's more than can be said for a lot of other shows clogging up the telly these days." Jasef Wisener of TV Overmind wrote, "'Bait' was absolutely spectacular, and it was the perfect follow-up to this show's series premiere. I can't believe how great this show already is, and I know that the best is yet to come. We're in for a great ride with Ash vs. Evil Dead, and I hope that this one manages to live on for years to come."

Bree Ogden of Bloody Disgusting wrote, "Overall, it was a really badass episode, especially for what I like to call a 'building block' episode, which can tend to lose a bit of steam in all the development. And I have to say, I absolutely cannot wait to see where the police investigation aspect of the show will take us. Ash has never had to answer to the cops for all the carnage he has undertaken, so the prospect of him butting heads with the law is electrifying." Blair Marnell of Nerdist wrote, "Aside from some minor missteps in Fisher's subplot, Ash vs. Evil Dead continued to be amazingly well produced. So far, I am loving this show."
