= The Killer of Killers =

- Ash vs Evil Dead episode
- Episode no.: Season 1 Episode 6
- Directed by: Michael Hurst
- Written by: Nate Crocker
- Cinematography by: John Cavill
- Editing by: Allanah Bazzard
- Original release date: December 5, 2015
- Running time: 27 minutes

Guest appearances
- Andrew Grainger as Lieutenant Boyle; Peter Feeney as Lem; Rachel Blampied as Waitress; Trae Shute as Boy

Episode chronology
← Previous "The Host"	Next → "Fire in the Hole"

"The Killer of Killers" is the sixth episode of the first season of the American comedy horror television series Ash vs Evil Dead, which serves as a continuation of the Evil Dead trilogy. The episode was written by Nate Crocker, and directed by Michael Hurst. It originally aired on the premium channel Starz on December 5, 2015.

The series is set 30 years after the events of the Evil Dead trilogy, and follows Ash Williams, who now works at the "Value Stop" as a simple stock boy. Having spent his life not doing anything remarkable since the events of the trilogy, Ash will have to renounce his routine existence and become a hero once more by taking up arms and facing the titular Evil Dead. In the episode, Ash, Pablo and Kelly arrive at a road diner to meet with an old friend of Ash, just as Amanda and Ruby are nearing them.

According to Nielsen Media Research, the episode was seen by an estimated 0.402 million household viewers and gained a 0.19 ratings share among adults aged 18–49. The episode received extremely positive reviews from critics, who praised the action sequences, performances, humor and character development.

== Plot ==
Using the severed hand, Ruby (Lucy Lawless) and Amanda (Jill Marie Jones) arrive at Brujo's property, just as Ash (Bruce Campbell) already left. As Ruby investigates the house, a Deadite force possesses Brujo's charred skeleton, preparing to attack Amanda. Ruby attacks the skeleton with a scythe, with the skeleton recognizing her and telling her she will never have control over the Necronomicon, before thrusting himself and Ruby into the pyre, which causes an explosion. Amanda leaves in Ruby's car, also discovering that Ash's hand disappeared.

At a road diner, Ash meets with an old militia friend, Lem (Peter Feeney), hoping to get more weapons in their quest. Ash is forced to stay in the diner when he lacks money to pay for their meals, so Pablo (Ray Santiago) and Kelly (Dana DeLorenzo) leave for his home trailer. Inside, they are disturbed by the Necronomicon, which comes alive, appearing to take an interest in Pablo's medallion. They lock the Necronomicon back in the trunk, and Pablo discovers that Kelly does not want to destroy the book, she actually wants to summon more demons to kill them to avenge her parents.

Back in the road diner, Ash flirts with the waitress, planning to pay the check for sex and asking her to meet him at the restroom. However, Amanda intercepts Ash, having followed him. They engage in a brutal fight, which culminates with Amanda arresting Ash. Just as Amanda's chief, Lieutenant Boyle (Andrew Grainger) arrives, a Deadite force strikes the road diner, killing some of the patrons and possessing Boyle and the waitress. Lem flees the scene, while Ash and Amanda fight the possessed Boyle and waitress. Ash kills Boyle, while Kelly arrives and brutally kills the waitress with a meat slicer before smashing her head with a tenderizer.

Fleeing into the woods, Lem calls a phone to explain the events to a person named Crosby Fonda. Sensing a Deadite force approaching, he tells Crosby that they need weapons as "the end is coming" before dropping off his phone, and runs just to be caught by the force. Back in the diner, Ash offers Amanda to join them in their quest, which she accepts.

== Production ==
=== Development ===
The episode was written by Nate Crocker, and directed by Michael Hurst. It was Crocker's first writing credit, and Hurst's first directorial credit.

== Reception ==
=== Viewers ===
In its original American broadcast, "The Killer of Killers" was seen by an estimated 0.402 million household viewers and gained a 0.19 ratings share among adults aged 18–49, according to Nielsen Media Research. This means that 0.19 percent of all households with televisions watched the episode. This was a slight decrease in viewership from the previous episode, which was watched by 0.430 million viewers with a 0.15 in the 18-49 demographics.

=== Critical reviews ===
"The Killer of Killers" received extremely positive reviews from critics. Matt Fowler of IGN gave the episode a "great" 8.5 out of 10 rating and wrote in his verdict, "'The Killer of Killers' was a great return to Deadite form after three episodes dealing with that mind-demon. Which, admittedly, looked cool but also worked to sap some of the fun out of the series. Ash even seemed more somber during that arc. So now everything's sort of shifted back into place. Guts galore!"

Michael Roffman of The A.V. Club gave the episode a "B+" grade and wrote, "It's easy to forget the gory roots of Ash Vs. Evil Dead. Back in the '80s, Sam Raimi's little splatter-film-that-could initially received an X-rating and was considered a 'video nasty' or a 'number one nasty,' and for all the right reasons: blood, guts, and pus spray everywhere; body parts are smashed or lopped off with ease; and, well, a woman is raped by a tree. No, Ash didn't sell The Evil Dead, the violence did. So, following a handful of episodes that thrived from much-needed character development, it's a relief to stumble into a messy half hour like 'The Killer of Killers', where the series revisits its murderous alma mater at an unfortunate roadside diner."

Gina McIntyre of Entertainment Weekly wrote, "Could it be that Ash Vs. Evil Dead just crossed one name off its roster of characters? It certainly would appear that way, what with Ruby evidently perishing in a fiery blast just a few minutes into tonight’s episode." Stephen Harber of Den of Geek wrote, "All in all, 'The Killer of Killers' is a much-needed breath of rotten air after the two-part sidequest to Brujo's house. The show reminds us that it's still got cojones, and it's not afraid to whip them out to make you say 'ewww' when it needs to."

Carissa Pavlica of TV Fanatic gave the episode a 4.5 star rating out of 5 and wrote, "Speaking of how things 'really are', did we also learn on 'The Killer of Killers' that Ruby wasn't who she said she was all along? That's something I've been wondering ever since Lucy Lawless first appears on Ash vs Evil Dead, so three quarters into the season, things are starting to pop!" Jasef Wisener of TV Overmind wrote, "'The Killer of the Killers' was just as comic book-y as I've come to expect with this series, and I mean that in the best possible way. Every scene on this show seems to be crazier than the last, and I'm excited that we just get the chance to watch it all unfold each week." Blair Marnell of Nerdist wrote, "Ash vs. Evil Dead continues to fire on all cylinders. I still would have preferred an hour-long format for this series, but it's hard to argue with the effectiveness of the current format. The story is blazing along, and there's just four episodes left before everyone goes back to where it all started: the cabin in the woods from The Evil Dead."
