= Sleepy Hollow season 3 =

Season of television series

Sleepy Hollow
- Season 3
- Starring: Tom Mison; Nicole Beharie; Lyndie Greenwood; Nikki Reed; Zach Appelman; Lance Gross; Jessica Camacho; Shannyn Sossamon
- No. of episodes: 18

Release
- Original network: Fox
- Original release: October 1, 2015 – April 8, 2016

Season chronology
- ← Previous; Season 2 Next → Season 4

The third season of the Fox television series Sleepy Hollow premiered on October 1, 2015, and consisted of 18 episodes. This season it moved time slots to Thursdays at 9:00 pm. On February 5, 2016, the show premiered in its new timeslot of Friday at 8:00 pm.

== Cast and characters ==
=== Main cast ===
- Tom Mison as Ichabod Crane
- Nicole Beharie as Special Agent Abigail "Abbie" Mills
- Lyndie Greenwood as Jennifer "Jenny" Mills
- Nikki Reed as Betsy Ross
- Zach Appelman as Joe Corbin
- Lance Gross as Special Agent Daniel Reynolds
- Jessica Camacho as Special Agent Sophie Foster
- Shannyn Sossamon as Pandora

=== Recurring cast ===
- Peter Mensah as the Hidden One
- Maya Kazan as Zoe Corinth
- Bill Irwin as Atticus Nevins
- James McDaniel as Ezra Mills

=== Guest cast ===
- Clancy Brown as Sheriff August Corbin
- Charles Aitken as Dr. Japeth Leeds
- Anthony K. Hyatt as Randall Martin
- Alexander Ward as Marcus Collins (a.k.a. The Whispering Wraith) / The Ghoul / Zombie
- Mark Campbell as George Washington
- Michael O'Keefe as FBI Director Jack Walters
- Marti Matulis as the Yaoguai / the Verslinder
- Craig Branham and Jeremy Owens as the Headless Horseman
- Dustin Lewis as Paul Revere
- Nicholas Guest as General William Howe
- Derek Mears as the Head Berserker / the Kindred
- C. Thomas Howell as Special Agent Mick Granger
- John Paul Marston as Colonel Prescott
- Charlene Amoia as Susan James
- Andy Pessoa as Young Ichabod
- Onira Tarés as Grace Dixon
- Robin Strasds as Daniel Boone
- Richard Kohlberger as Johnny Revere
- Katie Malia as Onryō
- Griffin Freeman as Nathan Hale
- Kelly Bellini as the Kindress
- Morgan Ayres as Young August Corbin
- Drew Matthews as Young Atticus Nevins
- C.C. Ice as Banshee
- Brad Ashten as Francis Scott Key
- Dan B. Norris as the Eternal Soldier

=== Special guest stars ===
- Emily Deschanel as Dr. Temperance "Bones" Brennan
- David Boreanaz as FBI Special Agent Seeley Booth

== Episodes ==
No. overall	No. in season	Title	Directed by	Written by	Original release date	Prod. code	US viewers (millions)
32	1	"I, Witness"	Peter Weller	Albert Kim	October 1, 2015	3AWL02	3.46
Nine months have passed since Katrina's death. A woman named Pandora encounters the Headless Horseman, seals him within a mysterious box, and summons a yaoguai, a demon that feeds on the fear of its victims. Ichabod reaches out to Abbie (who is now an FBI agent) after he is arrested and detained for smuggling an artifact into the United States. When Abbie arrives to collect him, he reveals Katrina's pendant, which is linked to the Horseman's power, has warned him of the latter's disappearance, meaning a new threat has emerged. The two are subsequently drawn into an investigation of a double homicide with both victims having shown great fear before they were killed. Ichabod leads Abbie and Jenny to a message left by his fellow agent Betsy Ross, which reveals the demon is drawn to the smell of gunpowder.
33	2	"Whispers in the Dark"	Russell Fine	M. Raven Metzner	October 8, 2015	3AWL01	3.27
A murder in a shopping mall is traced back to another demon, who targets those keeping dark secrets from others. To lure it in, Abbie reveals that she has recently found her absent father - although she has yet to tell Jenny - and Crane reveals General William Howe once offered him passage back to England in return for the names of rebel spies, which he nearly accepted.
34	3	"Blood and Fear"	Kate Dennis	Damian Kindler	October 15, 2015	3AWL03	2.97
Pandora gives a cursed knife to a troubled man, causing him to seek out and murder those he hates. Ichabod recalls a similar incident during his studies at Eton College in 1763, and identifies the knife as having once been used by Jack the Ripper. His research indicates that the knife itself has been linked to countless murders throughout history. As each wave of murders stopped amid a sudden outbreak of disease, the Witnesses realize that the curse can be broken by infecting the wielder. When an attempt to infect the man with malaria-tainted blood fails, Ichabod infects himself and uses his own blood to defeat the killer. Unbeknownst to them, Pandora collects Abbie's fear and uses it to fertilize her tree, causing a third flower to bloom on its branches.
35	4	"The Sisters Mills"	Guillermo Navarro	Heather V. Regnier	October 22, 2015	3AWL04	2.89
Ichabod and Abbie investigate a case involving two sisters; the younger had fallen into a mysterious coma, and the other tells them that she witnessed her sister being attacked by a monster. They learn that the creature responsible is called the Abyzou, which Ichabod likens to the Tooth Fairy once they discover that the demon targets children who are about to lose, or have lost, a tooth and feeds on their soul. Ichabod remembers that Betsy Ross was in a similar situation with her niece, and had enlisted the help of Paul Revere, who used silver to drive away the Abyzou. At the hospital, Pandora, posing as a nurse, persuades the older sister to offer herself to the demon in order to save her sibling.
36	5	"Dead Men Tell No Tales"	Russell Fine	Sam Chalsen & Nelson Greaves	October 29, 2015	3AWL05	4.57
Pandora reanimates General Howe and his soldiers as revenants, sending them to march on Sleepy Hollow during Halloween. Crane and Abbie break into Howe's grave, where they find mysterious bone fragments. Aided by Abbie's FBI contacts, Special Agent Seeley Booth (David Boreanaz) and Doctor Temperance "Bones" Brennan (Emily Deschanel), they trace the bones to an underground tomb beneath the Capitol, which was supposedly built for Washington and contains a prototype version of Greek fire, which Brennan mistakes for napalm. Using the fire, they destroy Howe and his men in the sewers. Although aware of Pandora's role in Howe's resurrection, Ichabod and Abbie are unaware that another flower has bloomed on her tree. This episode concludes a crossover with Bones that begins on "The Resurrection in the Remains", which features appearances by Ichabod and Abbie.
37	6	"This Red Lady from Caribee"	Olatunde Osunsanmi	Shernold Edwards	November 5, 2015	3AWL06	3.04
Pandora summons an insect-like demon that drives its victims into a state of intense paranoia. Among them is Abbie's superior at the FBI, Reynolds, who tries to kill her in a rage before being subdued. Using notes from Betsy, Ichabod and Abbie destroy the creature in its lair, during which they discover Pandora's tree just as the sixth blossom is blooming.
38	7	"The Art of War"	Hanelle Culpepper	Joe Webb	November 12, 2015	3AWL07	3.02
Jenny realizes that she has actually absorbed the power of the Shard of Anubis while trying to keep it out of another hunter's hands. In retaliation, the hunter summons a trio of berserkers to search for her and drain her power. Although the creatures are Norse in origin, Crane realizes that they were summoned using Pandora's magic, protecting them from their traditional weakness, mistletoe. His plan to turn the berserkers against each other using Jenny's blood succeeds, but not before Jenny is compelled by the Shard to locate Pandora's tree. Another flower blooms as Pandora brings forth her master, an unnamed deity.
39	8	"Novus Ordo Seclorum"	Russell Fine	Leigh Dana Jackson	November 19, 2015	3AWL08	2.80
Ichabod identifies the deity summoned by Pandora as a Sumerian God known only as 'the Hidden One.' Having witnessed the Shard back when it was in Colonial hands, he realizes they need the casing it was in to draw it out of Jenny. Pandora reveals she is not Greek, but a Sumerian sorceress who has spent centuries gathering magic to revive the Hidden One, who she refers to as her "husband." While Ichabod and Joe distract them, Abbie starts draining the Shard's power into the casing. When the Hidden One destroys the casing, she takes the pieces and, holding them together, finishes the process. But now it is full of unstable energy and about to explode, so Abbie takes it through Pandora's tree and into a portal to another dimension. The resulting energy release apparently destroys Pandora's box and her tree, leaving Abbie's fate unclear.
40	9	"One Life"	Kate Dennis	Albert Kim	February 5, 2016	3AWL09	3.13
One month later, Ichabod continues his frantic search for a way to find Abbie. While searching, he accidentally summons a demon that feeds on desperation and receives messages indicating Abbie is still alive. With the help of FBI agent Sophie Foster, Ichabod prevents the demon from killing Reynolds, who is grieving Abbie's disappearance, and traps it in an enchanted mirror where it is subsequently destroyed. Using a piece of her broken box, Pandora activates a beacon that draws all of the world's demons to Sleepy Hollow. Abbie wakes up in another world.
41	10	"Incident At Stone Manor"	Dwight Little	M. Raven Metzner	February 12, 2016	3AWL10	3.16
While one month passes on Earth, ten months pass for Abbie as she explores the deserted and ruined world she is trapped in, the world Pandora took the Hidden One from. She has not needed to eat or sleep, and has not aged, but has found Betsy Ross's cutlass. By projecting his astral form into the mystical world, Ichabod reconnects with Abbie. Pandora appears and expels Ichabod's spirit, offering to free Abbie in return for the Shard. Abbie refuses and destroys it, using a portal inside a well marked by Betsy's cutlass to escape. Jenny, Joe, and Sophia investigate a murder committed by a gargoyle.
42	11	"Kindred Spirits"	Olatunde Osunsanmi	Heather V. Regina	February 19, 2016	3AWL11	3.09
When the Kindred re-emerges and commits a series of murders, as well as abducting Ichabod's friend Zoe, he and Abbie learn that the creature has become resentful and seeks to make Zoe his bride. They locate the Kindress, a being created by Franklin to keep the Kindred calm, and bring her to life. The group rescues Zoe and watches as the Kindred and Kindress leave Sleepy Hollow forever. The Hidden One, who had earlier prompted the Kindred's rampage, uses his power to destroy both of them.
43	12	"Sins of the Father"	Wendey Stanzler	Damian Kindler	February 26, 2016	3AWL12	2.96
An old friend of August Corbin's, Atticus Nevins, returns to Sleepy Hollow and reaches out to Abbie with claims he's being tracked by a demon from his past. After being imprisoned, he explains that he and Corbin served in the army during the First Gulf War, during which their squad came across a ghoul guarding a cave full of gold. Corbin's notes reveal that the ghoul was summoned for the sole purpose of punishing grave robbers, and that it can be controlled with a golden scarab. Nevins reveals that he has the scarab in his possession, and then orders the ghoul to kill Ichabod and Abbie so that he can steal the notes. Abbie destroys the scarab, causing the ghoul to vanish. Abbie meets with her father at a café, worried about the onset of her mother's insanity. Later, she opens her diary, which is filled with a mysterious symbol she encountered during her time in Pandora's dimension; she pledges allegiance to the symbol, saying, "You saved me. I'm yours."
44	13	"Dark Mirror"	Sylvain White	Sam Chalsen & Nelson Greaves	March 4, 2016	3AWL13	2.96
Ichabod and Abbie investigate a case involving the Jersey Devil, and learn that the person responsible was a man named Dr. Japeth Leeds, who used alchemy to mutate himself. When they uncover his lab, Abbie is drawn to the symbol, which is attached to a wax cylinder that they decide to play on the doctor's old phonograph. They watch a video recording that explains how the Hidden One was once the supreme ruler of humanity, until he was betrayed and cast down into the underworld to guard a box containing all of the evil in the world. Pandora, a servant of the other gods, betrays and destroys them before joining the Hidden One in his desire to restore himself to power. Ichabod and Abbie confront Dr. Leeds when they learn that he plans to help Pandora restore her husband using the sacred hourglass that maintains the balance of good and evil. Abbie destroys him with a lightning rod, but Pandora escapes with the magical sand needed to complete the hourglass.
45	14	"Into the Wild"	Paul Edwards	Albert Kim	March 11, 2016	3AWL14	2.91
During an FBI survival exercise in the woods, Abbie, Sophia and Reynolds race to save their guide who was attacked by a Dutch demon known as a Verslinder. While Reynolds goes to get help, Abbie and Sophie discover that the creature was imprisoned 400 years ago by settlers, having bonded itself to a man named Thomas. Meanwhile, Joe and Jenny encounter a fragment of the destroyed box at an auction and successfully bid for it. Pandora ambushes them as they try to leave and starts strangling Jenny, so Joe offers her the piece so she will leave. Touching it (as the box summoned monsters) begins to transform Joe back into a wendigo and Pandora flees when he scratches her. Jenny holds him until he returns to his human form. When Ichabod learns Abbie's symbol has two parts, he places them against his tablet and has visions of Abbie in the woods. He then tracks down Abbie and Sophie, killing the Verslinder. Ichabod tells Abbie how he was able to find her and they speculate the symbol may not be evil.
46	15	"Incommunicado"	Russell Fine	Shernold Edwards & Heather V. Regnier	March 18, 2016	3AWL15	2.83
Ichabod is confronted by The Hidden One at the archives and is saved by the symbol, which drains his magic and creates a mystic barrier around the Archives, trapping him and Ichabod within. In the tunnels, Abbie encounters Pandora and learns the symbol is known as the Emblem of Thura, and that it can contain even the strongest gods. With few other options, they agree to work together to destroy it. Meanwhile, Jenny, Joe, and Sophia investigate a case involving three men who were killed by a banshee. After learning the banshee is irritated by loud noises, they lure it with an ambulance siren, but before they can kill it, Abbie sends Jenny a text saying they need it alive so Pandora can use it to break the barrier, and it escapes. Joe is forced to kill it to save Jenny and offers himself to Pandora in its place. Assuming his wendigo form, Pandora channels Joe's dark energy using the fragments of the box, including the one Jenny and Joe have, and breaks the barrier. Afterwards, Ichabod discovers the emblem has been destroyed, along with the tablet.
47	16	"Dawn's Early Light"	Paul Edwards	Leigh Dana Jackson & Sam Chalsen & Nelson Greaves	March 25, 2016	3AWL16	2.52
The Hidden One reacts angrily to the news Pandora knew that Abbie and Ichabod had the emblem in their possession and strips her of most of her power. Pandora turns against him and visits the Witnesses, offering to help them recreate her box and imprison the Hidden One within it. Although skeptical, Ichabod listens on as she tells him it can only be regenerated in the catacombs where it was first forged. While searching for a golden thread left by Betsy Ross in the first American flag, they accidentally summon the immortal guardian who protects it. Using a musical clue, they find the entrance at Fort McHenry. Pandora appears before the Hidden One in astral form and escapes with him. Ichabod and Abbie discover Betsy's flag hidden inside a statue of Orpheus, with Joe and Jenny arriving to defeat the guardian. The dawn's early light reacts with the flag, revealing a path left by Washington leading to the catacombs.
48	17	"Delaware"	Marc Roskin	Damian Kindler	April 1, 2016	3AWL17	2.62
Ichabod and Abbie travel to Pennsylvania and take a boat along the Delaware River, transporting themselves to the River Styx using the flag. Meanwhile Pandora, Reynolds, Jenny, and Joe along with Sophia travel to a remote mountain where the Hidden One plans to use the hourglass to regain his full power. To slow him down, they work to sabotage the ley lines surrounding the mountain. Along the way, Ichabod and Abbie discover the remains of an expedition led by Washington and Betsy to secure a portal to the catacombs, which they enter. Inside, they find Betsy, who has been effectively frozen in time. The Hidden One uses his power to turn Joe back into a wendigo, and Jenny is forced to kill him. Having regained all of his power, the Hidden One prepares to destroy the world so he can remake it in his image.
49	18	"Ragnarok"	Russell Fine	M. Raven Metzner	April 8, 2016	3AWL18	2.96
In the antechamber of the temple, Ichabod restores the box, but soon realizes that the soul of a Witness is needed to use its power. Betsy is able to return to her own time while Abbie, who feels the effects of the box, joins Ichabod and Jenny in confronting the Hidden One. Ichabod returns the box to Pandora who uses it to absorb the Hidden One's power, but without a soul, the box is useless. Abbie sacrifices herself, while Ichabod and Jenny watch helplessly. As the Hidden One is now mortal, Jenny kills him. Ichabod revives the Horseman, and allows him to take his revenge on Pandora. A dying Pandora reveals that Abbie cannot be resurrected, and Ichabod has a heartfelt goodbye with her before she moves on to the afterlife. At Abbie's grave, Ichabod learns about a secret order founded by Washington from Jenny's father. Ichabod vows to find the next Witness after learning that Abbie's soul will soon be revived in another's body. He then leaves for Washington D.C., assisted by members of the order.

== Production ==
=== Casting ===
On July 15, 2015, it was announced that Nikki Reed had joined the cast in a series regular role as Betsy Ross, an old flame of Ichabod. Also joining the cast is Shannyn Sossamon who is set to play Pandora, a mysterious new presence in Sleepy Hollow who seeks the assistance of Ichabod and Abbie. Jessica Camacho who plays the role of Sophia Foster, was also upgraded to series regular this season.

It was also announced that Orlando Jones would not be reprising his role this season, and that Neil Jackson would not be appearing as the Headless Horseman this season, due to the creative changes made to the show by the new showrunner.

=== Filming ===
Production was moved from Wilmington, North Carolina when the state scrapped the tax credits incentive, to Atlanta, Georgia where it was reported that the show will receive 30% tax credits.

=== Crossover with Bones ===
A crossover event with Bones aired on October 29, 2015. It consists of two parts, with characters from both shows appearing in both episodes. The two episodes are linked by the use of the corpse of General William Howe, the British commander during the American Revolution; his skull is revealed to have essentially served as the murder weapon in Bones and he is reanimated by Pandora to serve as a weapon against Crane in Sleepy Hollow.

== Reception ==
=== Ratings ===
No. in series	No. in season	Title	Original air date	Time slot (EST)	U.S. Rating/share (18–49)	Viewers (millions)	DVR (18–49)	DVR viewers (millions)	DVR Total (18–49)	Total viewers (millions)
32	1	"I, Witness"	October 1, 2015	Thursday; 9:00 p.m.	1.0/3	3.46	0.8	2.22	1.8	5.68
33	2	"Whispers in the Dark"	October 8, 2015	Thursday; 9:00 p.m.	1.0/3	3.27	0.7	2.01	1.7	5.28
34	3	"Blood and Fear"	October 15, 2015	Thursday; 9:00 p.m.	0.8/3	2.97	0.7	1.96	1.5	4.93
35	4	"The Sisters Mills"	October 22, 2015	Thursday; 9:00 p.m.	0.8/3	2.89	0.7	2.04	1.5	4.93
36	5	"Dead Men Tell No Tales"	October 29, 2015	Thursday; 9:00 p.m.	1.1/3	4.57	0.8	2.46	1.9	7.03
37	6	"This Red Lady from Caribee"	November 5, 2015	Thursday; 9:00 p.m.	0.9/3	3.04	0.7	1.87	1.6	4.91
38	7	"The Art of War"	November 12, 2015	Thursday; 9:00 p.m.	0.9/3	3.02	0.7	1.75	1.6	4.76
39	8	"Novus Ordo Seclorum"	November 19, 2015	Thursday; 9:00 p.m.	0.8/2	2.80	0.6	1.75	1.4	4.55
40	9	"One Life"	February 5, 2016	Friday; 8:00 p.m.	0.9/3	3.13	0.6	1.79	1.5	4.91
41	10	"Incident At Stone Manor"	February 12, 2016	Friday; 8:00 p.m.	0.8/3	3.16	0.6	1.70	1.4	4.86
42	11	"Kindred Spirits"	February 19, 2016	Friday; 8:00 p.m.	0.7/3	3.09	0.6	1.58	1.3	4.67
43	12	"Sins of the Father"	February 26, 2016	Friday; 8:00 p.m.	0.8/3	2.96	—N/a	1.53	—N/a	4.49
44	13	"Dark Mirror"	March 4, 2016	Friday; 8:00 p.m.	0.7/3	2.96	0.6	1.66	1.3	4.62
45	14	"Into the Wild"	March 11, 2016	Friday; 8:00 p.m.	0.8/3	2.91	0.5	1.44	1.3	4.35
46	15	"Incommunicado"	March 18, 2016	Friday; 8:00 p.m.	0.8/3	2.83	0.5	1.44	1.3	4.27
47	16	"Dawn's Early Light"	March 25, 2016	Friday; 8:00 p.m.	0.7/3	2.52	0.5	1.53	1.2	4.05
48	17	"Delaware"	April 1, 2016	Friday; 8:00 p.m.	0.6/3	2.62	0.6	1.53	1.2	4.15
49	18	"Ragnarok"	April 8, 2016	Friday; 8:00 p.m.	0.7/3	2.96	—N/a	—N/a	—N/a	—N/a
