= Jessica Camacho =

American actress

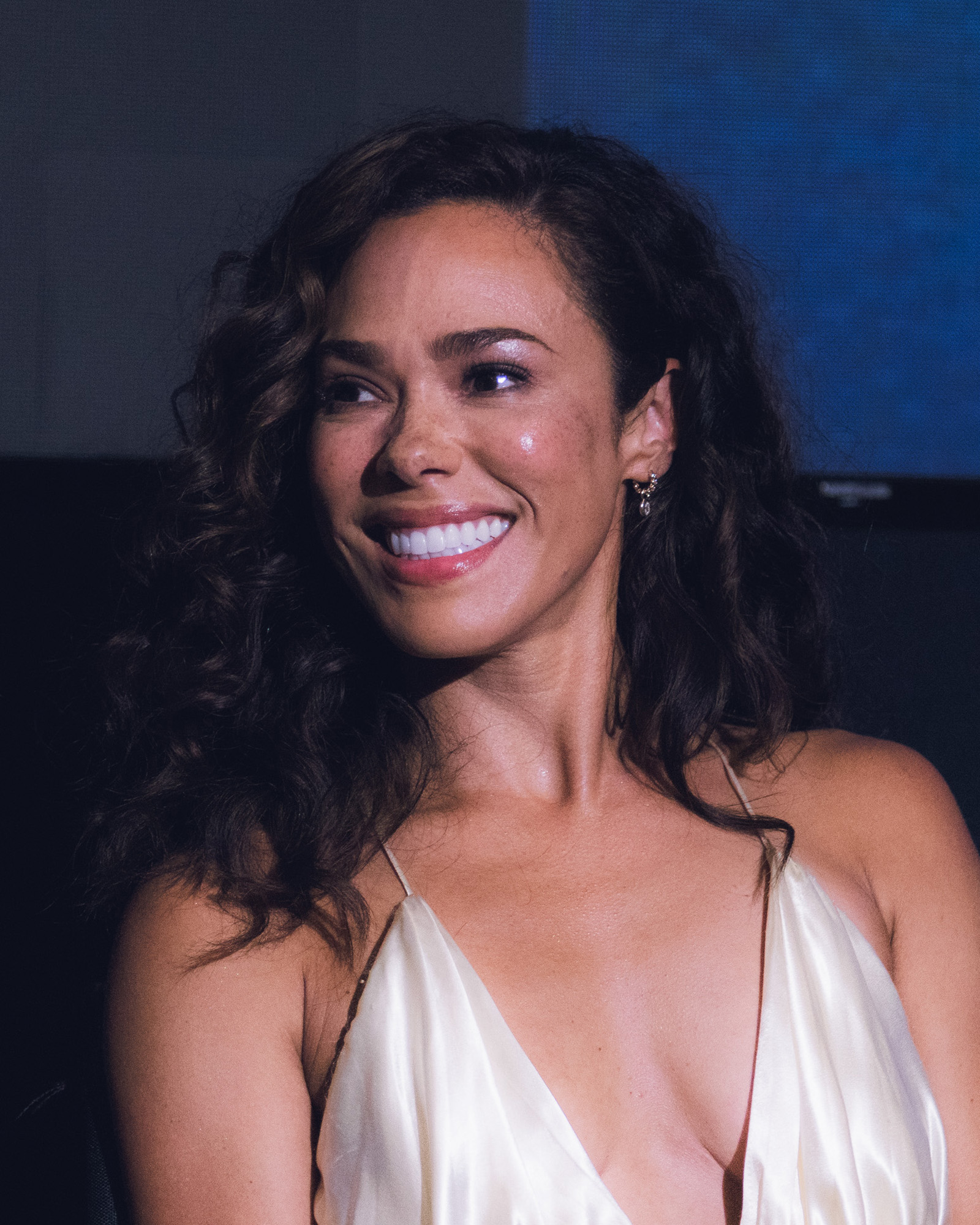
- Camacho in 2025
- Born: November 26, 1982 (age 43); Chicago, Illinois, U.S.
- Occupation: Actress
- Years active: 2007–present

Jessica Lisa Camacho (born November 28, 1982) is an American actress. She is best known for her lead roles as FBI Agent Sophie Foster on the third season of the Fox supernatural drama series Sleepy Hollow (2015–16), Emily Lopez on the CBS legal drama series All Rise (2019–23), Santana on the second season of the NBC action thriller series Taken (2018), and DEA Special Agent Amber Oliveras on the Prime Video crime series Countdown (2025).

== Early life ==
Camacho was born in Chicago, Illinois to Puerto Rican parents. Raised in St. Petersburg, Florida. She has acknowledged her Puerto Rican heritage in various interviews and on social media, where she has discussed her family's cultural traditions and her connection to Puerto Rico.

== Career ==
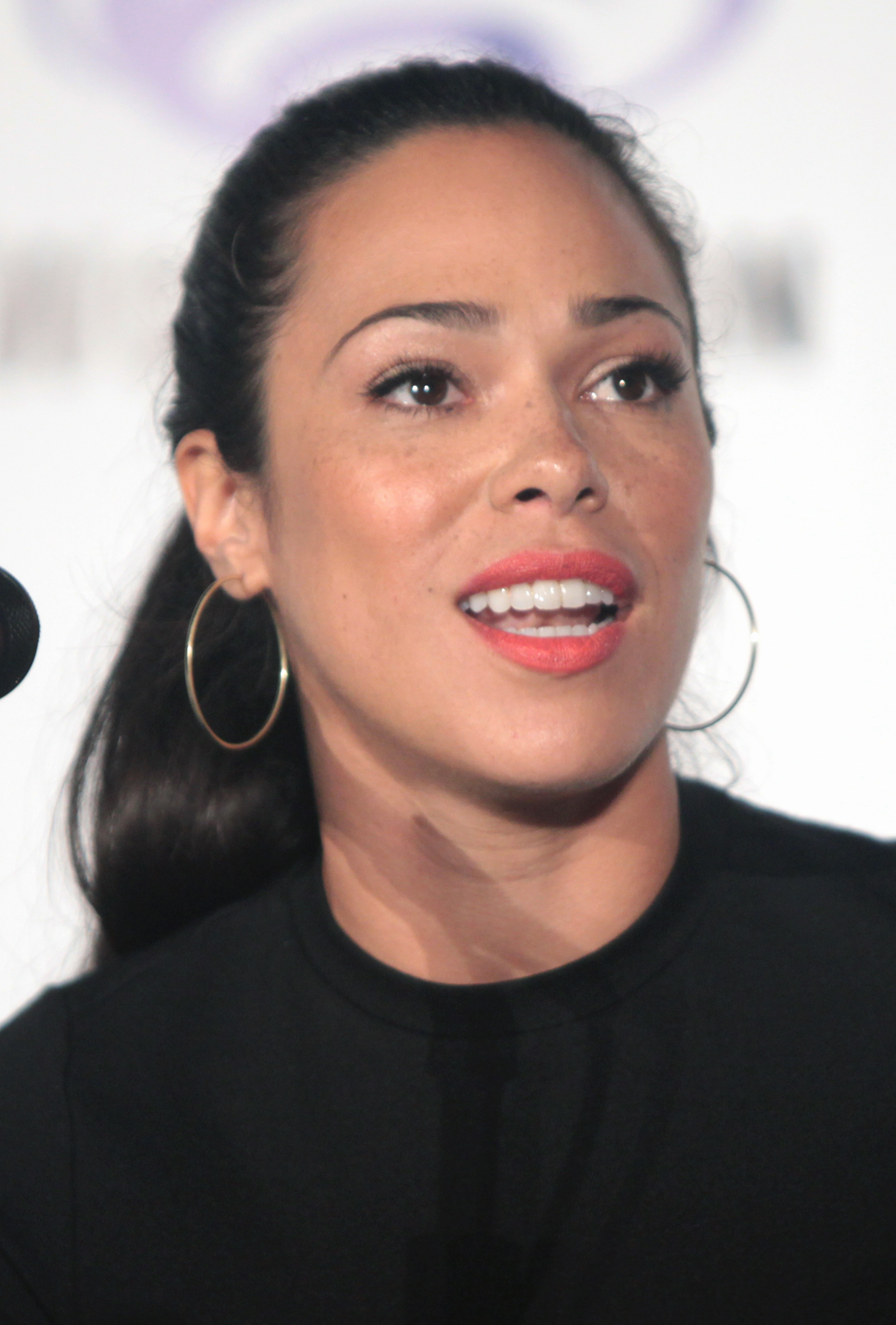
Camacho in 2016

Camacho had a recurring role as Gypsy on The CW superhero series The Flash (2017–18), and as Pilar Cortez on the ABC military drama series Last Resort (2012–13).

== Filmography ==
=== Film ===
Year	Title	Role	Notes
2008	Desertion	Amber	
2008	Nothing like the Holidays	Puerto Rican Brunette	
2012	Think Like a Man	Melissa	
2014	Veronica Mars	Martina Vasquez	
2014	Suburban Gothic	Noelle	
2015	Ana Maria in Novela Land	Officer Gonzalez	
2016	The Babymoon	Yesenia	
2017	Roman J. Israel, Esq.	Coalition Activist #2	
2017	Crave: The Fast Life	Brie	
2026	Batman: Knightfall	Renee Montoya (voice)	Direct-to-Video

=== Television ===
Year	Title	Role	Notes
2007	Come On Over	Joy	Episode: "Express Yourself"
2009	The Beast	Savannah	Episode: "Capone"
2010	Justified	Sherese Mason	Episode: "Fixer"
2010	Dexter	Yasmin Aragon	Episodes: "Everything Is Illumenated", "Circle Us"
2010	Undercovers	Bank Representative	Episode: "A Night to Forget"
2011	The Mentalist	Nurse Daisy	Episode: "Bloodstream"
2011	Gossip Girl	Marilu	Episode: "Yes, Then Zero"
2012	El Jefe	Lucia	Unsold pilot
2012	Wedding Band	Spanish Waitress	Episode: "Time of My Life"
2012–2013	Last Resort	Pilar Cortez	Recurring role; 10 episodes
2013	Nikita	Rachel	Episodes: "Broken Home", "Masks", "Tipping Point"
2013	Law & Order: Special Victims Unit	Gloria Montero	Episode: "Poisoned Motive"
2013	Hello Ladies	Erika	Episode: "Long Beach"
2014	NCIS: Los Angeles	Rita	Episode: "Tuhon"
2014	Castle	Marisa Aragon	Episode: "Kill Switch"
2015	Bones	Lauren Slater	Episode: "The Verdict in the Victims"
2015	Stalker	Eva Bowen	Episode: "Love Kills"
2015	Rizzoli & Isles	Karina	Episode: "Nice to Meet You, Dr. Isles"
2015	Longmire	Kiersten	Episodes: "Shotgun", "Hector Lives"
2015	Minority Report	Lina Massero	Episode: "Hawk-Eye"
2015–2016	Sleepy Hollow	Sophie Foster	Main role (season 3)
2016	Harley and the Davidsons	Reya	Episode: "Legacy"
2016	Frequency	Eva Salinas	Episode: "Bleed Over"
2017	Casual	Elena	Episode: "Venus"
2017–2018	The Flash	Cynthia / Gypsy	Recurring role; 10 episodes
2018	Taken	Santana	Main role (season 2)
2019	Another Life	Michelle Vargas	Recurring role; 6 episodes
2019	Watchmen	Pirate Jenny	Recurring role; 4 episodes
2019–2023	All Rise	Emily Lopez	Main role
2021	A Christmas Proposal	Maria Winters	Television film
2022–2024	S.W.A.T.	Jackie Vasquez	4 episodes
2023	Bosch: Legacy	Jade Quinn / Janice Morrell	Recurring role; 7 episodes
2025	Countdown	Amber Oliveras	Main role
