= Mark Goffman =

American television writer and producer

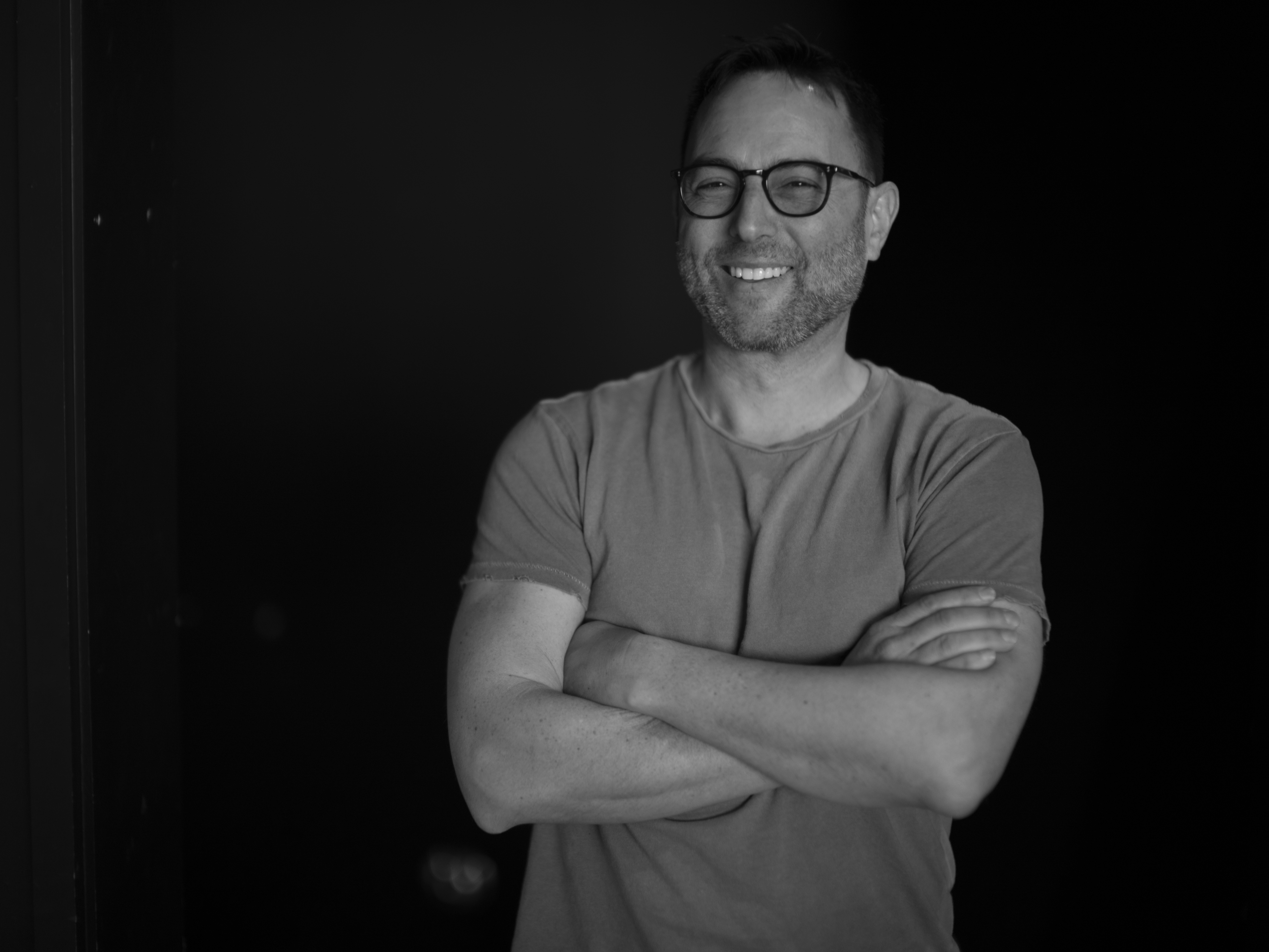
- Goffman in 2020
- Occupations: Television writer, producer
- Years active: 1999–present

Mark Goffman is an American television writer and producer. He currently serves as an executive producer for the Netflix series The Umbrella Academy. Prior to that, Goffman worked as the showrunner and an executive producer for CBS's Bull.

== Early life ==
Goffman began writing professionally in Brussels, for the magazine Commerce in Belgium. He went on to Harvard’s Kennedy School of Government to receive a masters in public policy. He has written speeches for state and federally elected officials and has consulted to the United States Department of State and the White House.

Goffman has a B.A. in Economics and Philosophy from Emory University and served as a Masters Thesis Advisor, Fiction Writing Program, at Johns Hopkins University.

== Career ==
Goffman began his TV writing career in 2002 as a staff writer on The West Wing, where he wrote for several seasons. In 2006, he joined NBC’s Studio 60 on the Sunset Strip, where he was a producer and ran the writers' room.

Goffman has worked on more than 200 hours of scripted television, been nominated for two Writers Guild of America Awards, and won the Entertainment Industries Council SET Award. The Hollywood Reporter has listed Goffman as one of the 50 most influential writers in television. One of his episodes of Law and Order: SVU garnered Golden Globe and Emmy nominations for Mariska Hargitay in 2009. He has also served as the showrunner for seasons 1 and 2 on Fox's Sleepy Hollow, as well as an executive producer for CBS's Limitless and USA Network's White Collar. His pilot I Am Victor, starring John Stamos, was produced for NBC.

Goffman also wrote and directed the critically acclaimed feature documentary, Dumbstruck, a film about ventriloquists, which was released in Spring 2011 by Magnolia Pictures.

Goffman's play, Me Too, produced by David O. Sacks, premiered at the Stella Adler Theater in Hollywood.

In 2020, Goffman appeared as a guest on the Studio 60 on the Sunset Strip marathon fundraiser episode of The George Lucas Talk Show.
