= Zoë Green =

British screenwriter

Zoë Green is an English born Film and TV writer.

== Education ==
She was educated for eight years at the girls' boarding school Roedean School and then spent a year volunteering at an orphanage in Morocco before attending Robinson College, Cambridge. At Cambridge she studied English literature and produced and directed plays at the Cambridge University Amateur Dramatic Club.

== Journalism ==
As a student Green wrote book reviews for The Guardian and The Observer before relocating to Los Angeles where she continued to occasionally contribute to both papers.

== Screenwriting ==
Green's first assignment was as a TV writer on Marvel Studios Wolverine and the X-Men followed by a sci-fi pilot sale, Dreamsolver, to ABC Television. She was then hired by The Walt Disney Company to write the feature film Tigress for comic book legend and producer Stan Lee, followed by Gargoyles and subsequently sold a movie pitch Book of Shadows to director Rob Reiner under his banner Castle Rock Entertainment, which she scripted.

Soon after this she was hired by producers George Clooney and Grant Heslov at Smokehouse Pictures to adapt Neal Stephenson's 1996 Hugo Award-winning post-cyberpunk novel The Diamond Age into a 3-part special event miniseries for the SyFy Channel.

Following two years working at 20th Century Fox in their new punch up feature writers room (Fox Writers Studio), Green returned to TV to join Ash vs Evil Dead from Exec Producer Sam Raimi. This was followed by writing on season two of Game of Thrones for Telltale Games. She then wrote on Sleepy Hollow for Fox.

Subsequently, Green was hired as a team with Patrick Given to write a feature film based on the life of the Polish teenage Holocaust rescuer Irene Gut Opdyke, by Good Deed Entertainment with Annabel Jankel as director. She then became a writer/producer for Siren (TV series) on Freeform/Hulu and wrote on Carnival Row for Amazon. After this, she set up an original feature script, Tarot with Hyde Park Entertainment. Following this she was hired by Walden Media to adapt an upcoming YA novel for TV and set up an original comedy pilot that she wrote during lockdown.

== Filmography ==
- Devil's Due (2014)
