= Ben Fransham =

New Zealand actor

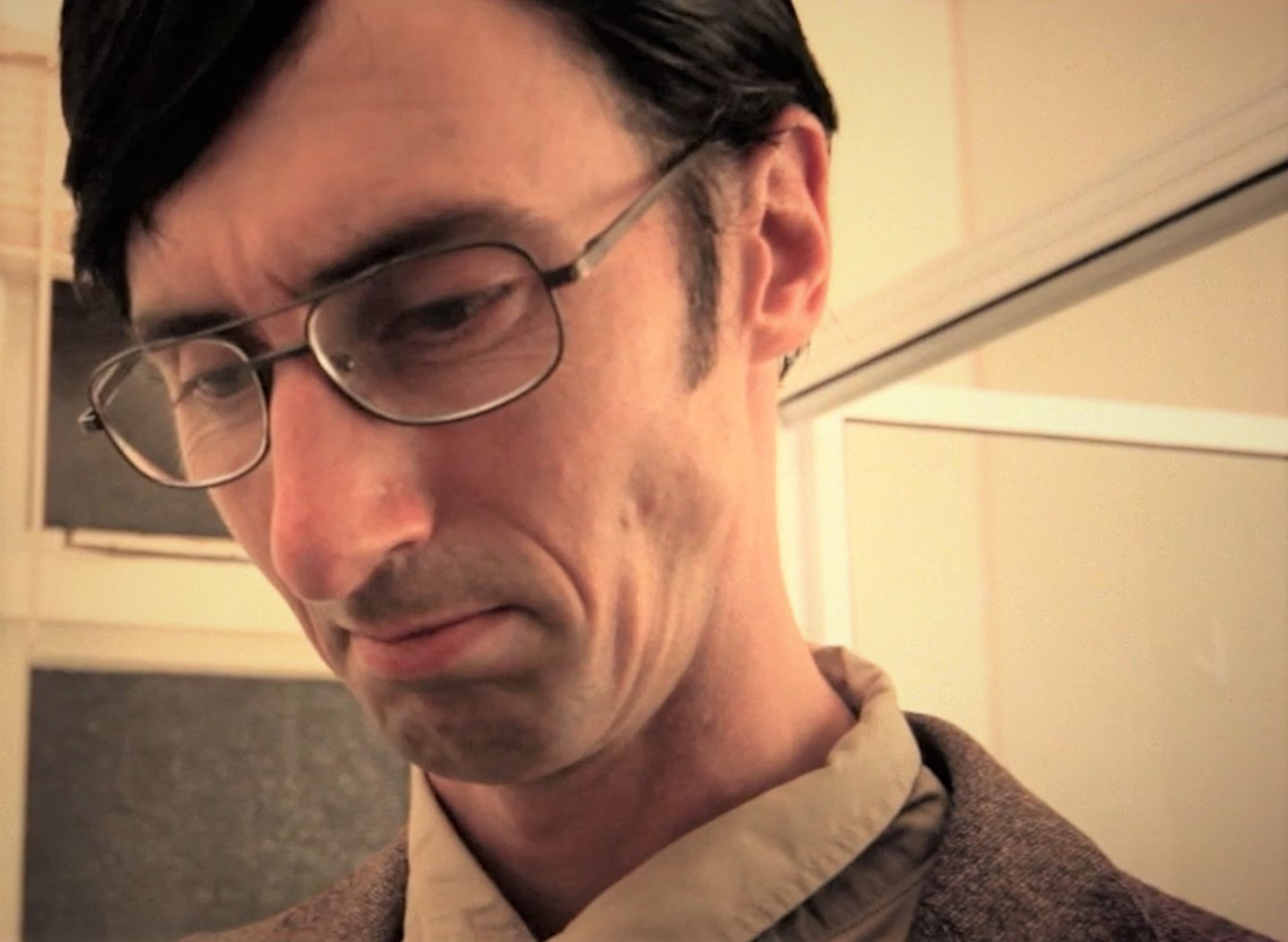
- Fransham in 2013
- Born: New Zealand
- Occupation: Actor
- Years active: 1992–present
- Known for: What We Do in the Shadows

Ben Fransham is a New Zealand actor known for his role as Petyr in the 2014 comedy What We Do in the Shadows.

== Career ==
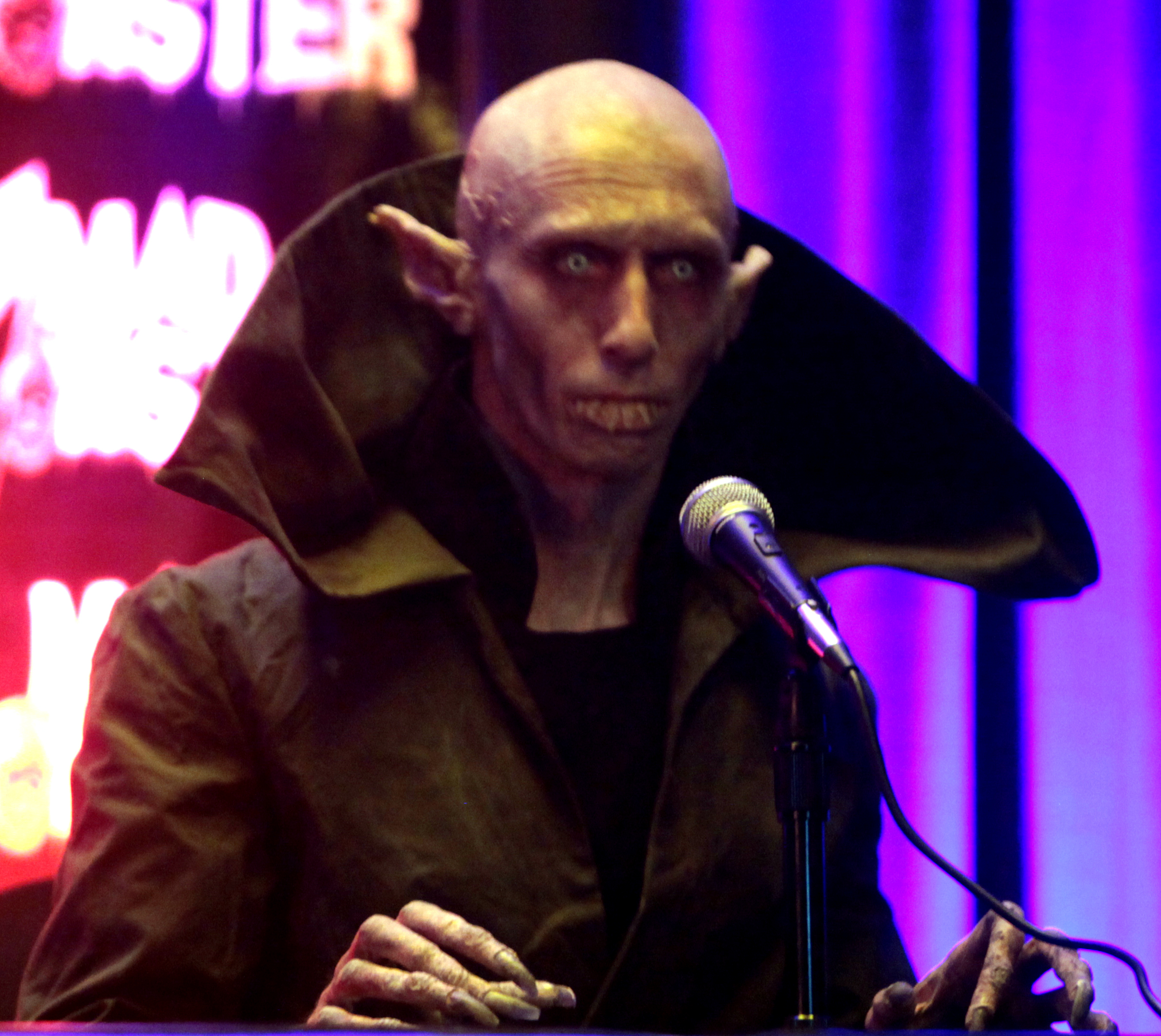
Fransham in costume as Petyr from What We Do in the Shadows, 2016

He made his dramatic role debut as Rudy in Jacqueline Coats' stage production of Bent, which won a 1997 Chapmann Tripp Theatre Award for Most Original Production of the Year. Since then, he has performed in musical theatre, dramatic plays, vaudeville, puppetry, and sketch comedy shows, with increasing work in film and television.

Fransham performed in several episodes of Legend of the Seeker (2008–2010), in various featured roles of horrifying creatures. The actor has worked across multiple disciplines, including stunt performance, (e.g., with Terry Notary, in The Hobbit film trilogy, as a goblin, and with the stunt team as various orcs, goblins, humans, and elves).

In 2014, Fransham played the role of a vampire in the film What We Do in the Shadows and in 2015, he appeared in three episodes of the first season of Ash vs Evil Dead.

== Selected filmography ==
=== Film ===
List of film appearances, with year, title, and role shown
Year	Title	Role	Notes
1994	Heavenly Creatures	Charles	
1994	The Last Tattoo	Dancing sailor	
2001	The Lord of the Rings: The Fellowship of the Ring	Various	Uncredited
2002	The Lord of the Rings: The Two Towers	Elven warrior	Uncredited
2007	The Ferryman	The Ferryman	
2007	30 Days of Night	Heron	
2012	The Hobbit: An Unexpected Journey	Goblin	Uncredited
2013	Alfons: Too Much Hanky Not Enough Panky	Alfons	Short
2014	What We Do in the Shadows	Petyr	
2014	The Cure	ER doctor	

=== Television ===
List of television appearances, with year, title, and role shown
Year	Title	Role	Notes
2008–2010	Legend of the Seeker	Various	6 episodes
2015	Ash vs Evil Dead	Eligos	3 episodes, season 1
2017	The Shannara Chronicles	Red Wraith / Black Wraith	6 episodes
2018–2021	Wellington Paranormal	Officer Roy / Mobot Movement Specialist / Cheeseface	3 episodes
2021	Mr. Corman	Man	2 episodes
