= List of Beauty & the Beast (2012 TV series) characters =

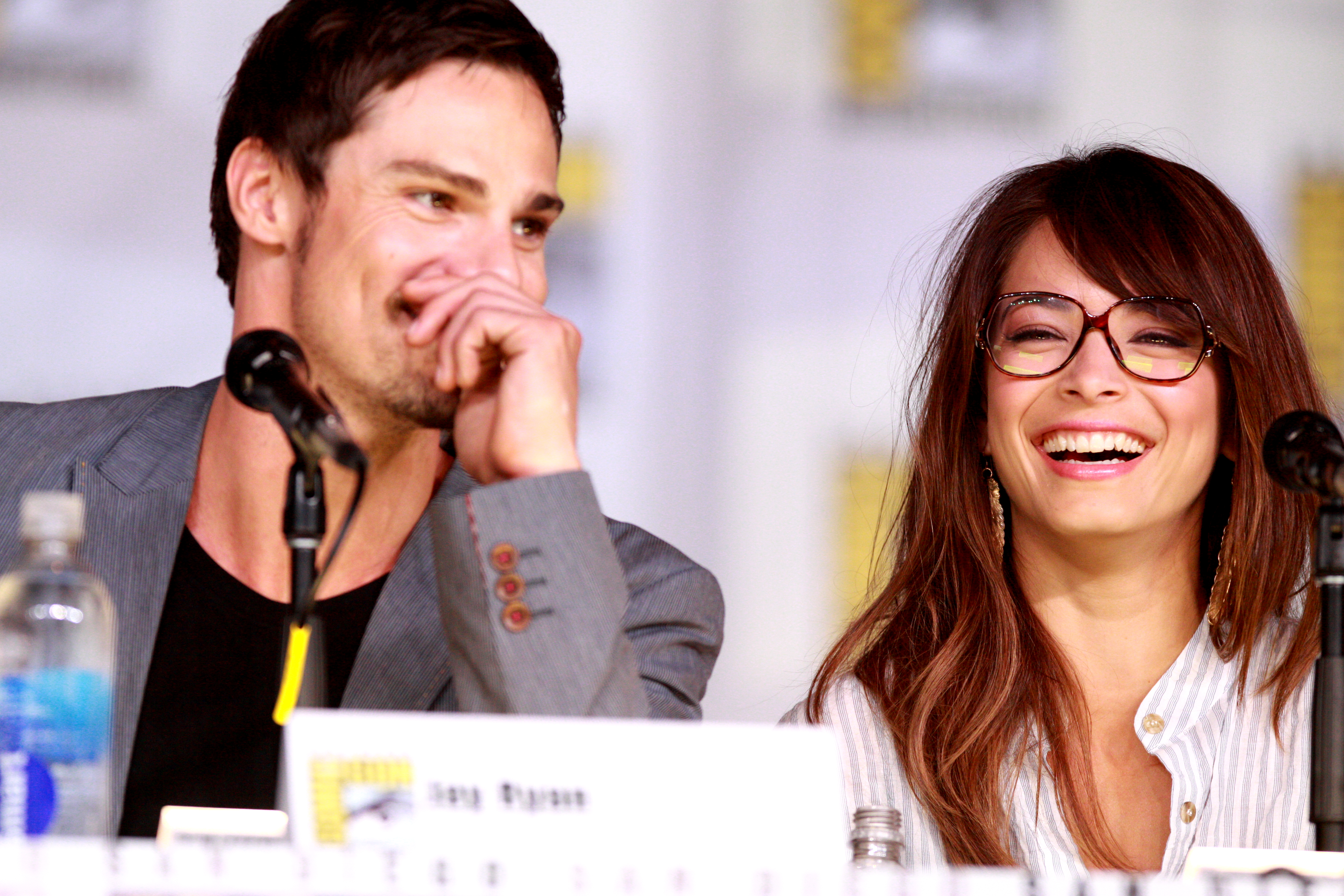
Kristin Kreuk and Jay Ryan portray the titular beauty and beast

The following is a list of characters from The CW science fiction drama Beauty & the Beast, which is loosely based on the 1987 CBS series of the same name.

== Cast ==
Actor	Character	Season			
Actor	Character	1	2	3	4
Kristin Kreuk	Catherine Chandler	Main	Main	Main	Main
Jay Ryan	Vincent Keller	Main	Main	Main	Main
Austin Basis	J.T. Forbes	Main	Main	Main	Main
Nina Lisandrello	Tess Vargas	Main	Main	Main	Main
Brian White	Joe Bishop	Main			
Max Brown	Evan Marks	Main			Guest
Sendhil Ramamurthy	Gabriel Lowen	Main	Main		
Amber Skye Noyes	Tori Windsor		Main		
Nicole Gale Anderson	Heather Chandler	Recurring	Recurring	Main	Main
Michael Roark	Kyle Johnson				Main

== Main characters ==
=== Catherine "Cat" Chandler ===
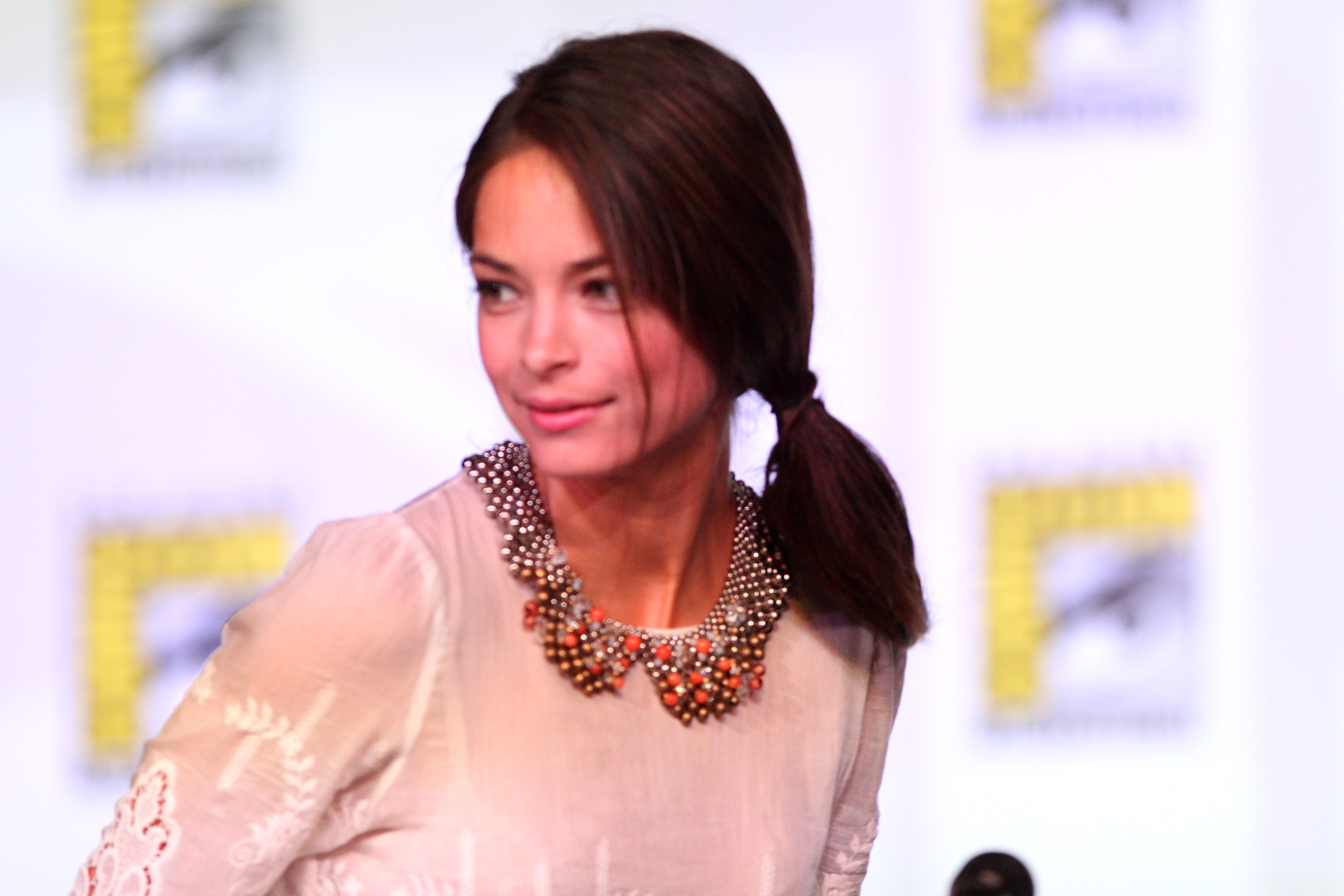
Kristin Kreuk plays the role of Catherine.

Catherine "Cat" Chandler (Kristin Kreuk) is a homicide detective with the NYPD's Special Crimes Unit assigned to the 125th Precinct. Nine years before the pilot, she was nearly killed by the men who murdered her mother, but saved by a mysterious beast. In the pilot, she finds out the "beast" is actually Vincent, and keeps his secret to protect him from Muirfield, the organization who created him. While helping to protect him, she and Vincent fall in love. Catherine fights for Vincent after he is kidnapped by Muirfield and brainwashed into forgetting her, helping him to regain his memories and remember their love. Catherine breaks up with Vincent when, as a result of his brainwashing, he chooses revenge, rather than saving their love. She dates Gabe after they break up. When Vincent tries to win her back, Catherine pushes him away and stays with Gabe. Vincent, though, is able to prove to her that he has changed, and Catherine breaks up with Gabe, reuniting with Vincent. Soon after, they get engaged, and marry in the season 3 finale. Catherine has discovered that through her birth father, she is related to Rebecca Reynolds, who was also in love with a beast back in the 1800s.

She graduated from Princeton University before joining the police academy.

=== Vincent Keller ===
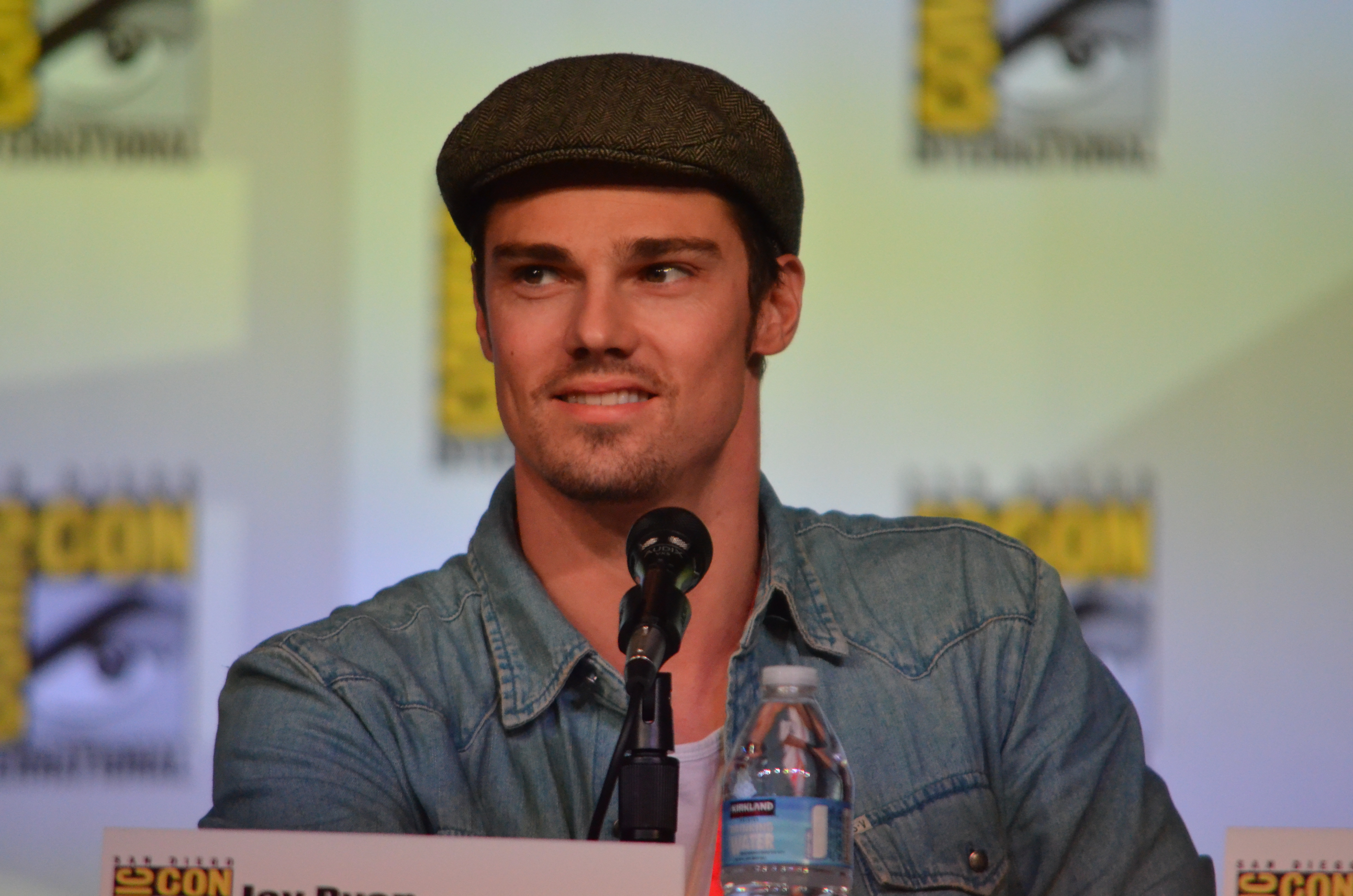
Jay Ryan plays the role of Vincent.

Vincent Ryan Keller (Jay Ryan) is a former medical doctor who enlisted in the United States Army after 9/11, and was part of an experiment called Operation Muirfield that turned them into super soldiers. Vincent's DNA was mutated and he developed the ability to transform into a beastly creature; he turns into the creature whenever he is distressed. When the Army shut down Muirfield because the experiment was out of control, Vincent survived and faked his own death, hiding out in New York. In Season 1, he starts to come out of hiding when he falls in love with Catherine, the woman he saved nine years before and who he has been watching over ever since, and the two work together to protect him from Muirfield. When he's kidnapped in Season 2, his memory is erased, and he doesn't remember Catherine. He is "programmed" into an assassin, killing any beasts and people associated with Muirfield. He is able to regain his memories spending time with Catherine, but is more angry and powerful. When Catherine tries to stop him from resorting to violence, Vincent feels betrayed, and they break up. After their break up, he revealed his identity and came out of hiding. He dates Tori Windsor, another beast, before she dies. After Tori's death, Vincent realizes the extent of the damage of his actions, and decides to change, choosing his humanity over being a beast in order to win Catherine back. Though Catherine rejects him, Vincent doesn't give up on her, and he & Catherine eventually reunite. He proposes to Catherine soon after, and they get engaged; they eventually marry in the season 3 finale.

Vincent grew up in Queens, and lost two of his brothers in the Towers. At the time he faked his death in 2002, Vincent held the rank of Specialist in the United States Army Special Forces.

=== J.T. Forbes ===
J.T. Forbes (Austin Basis) is Vincent's childhood friend and a professor at a university in New York. He hid Vincent from the men who have been hunting him for a decade out of guilt, as he felt responsible for what happened to Vincent – J.T. was the one that signed him up for the Muirfield program, thinking he would be protecting Vincent by doing so. Though he tried to help Vincent find a cure, they stopped trying after several failed attempts. Initially resistant to Catherine being part of Vincent's life, J.T. started to accept her when she helped protect Vincent from Muirfield. After Vincent is kidnapped and brainwashed by Muirfield, J.T. began to develop feelings for Tess, Catherine's best friend, and the two eventually started dating. J.T. was grievously injured by Gabe, but survived after being injected with a superhuman healing serum. J.T. desperately worked to rid his body of the serum afterwards, trying to save his life. Eventually, he found a cure that stopped the effects of the serum.

=== Tess Vargas ===
Tess Vargas (Nina Lisandrello) is Catherine's best friend who eventually discovers and reluctantly agrees to keep Vincent's secret, for Cat's sake. Though willing to protect Vincent's secret, she wasn't happy when Cat became distant from her while trying to help Vincent. Tess was having an affair with her boss, Lt. Joe Bishop, when she found out about Vincent, until Joe was fired from the precinct. When Cat was trying to help Vincent, Tess bonded with J.T., Vincent's best friend, over being pushed away by their best friends because of the secrets; though Tess was initially resisting him, the two started dating soon after. Tess was Catherine's partner, until she got promoted to captain of the 125th Precinct.

=== Heather Chandler ===
Heather Chandler (Nicole Gale Anderson) is Catherine's younger sister. Catherine let Heather stay at her place while she tried to find a job. Heather moved to Miami to further her career and got engaged, but later returned to New York after her engagement ended. Heather was initially distrustful of Vincent, and didn't approve of his & Catherine's relationship. She finds out Vincent's secret, and starts to accept him when he protects both her & Catherine, and helps Catherine and the group keep Vincent from being exposed.

=== Kyle Johnson ===
Kyle Johnson (Michael Roark) is an EMT that works at the hospital alongside Vincent, who takes a romantic interest in Heather.

=== Gabriel "Gabe" Lowen ===
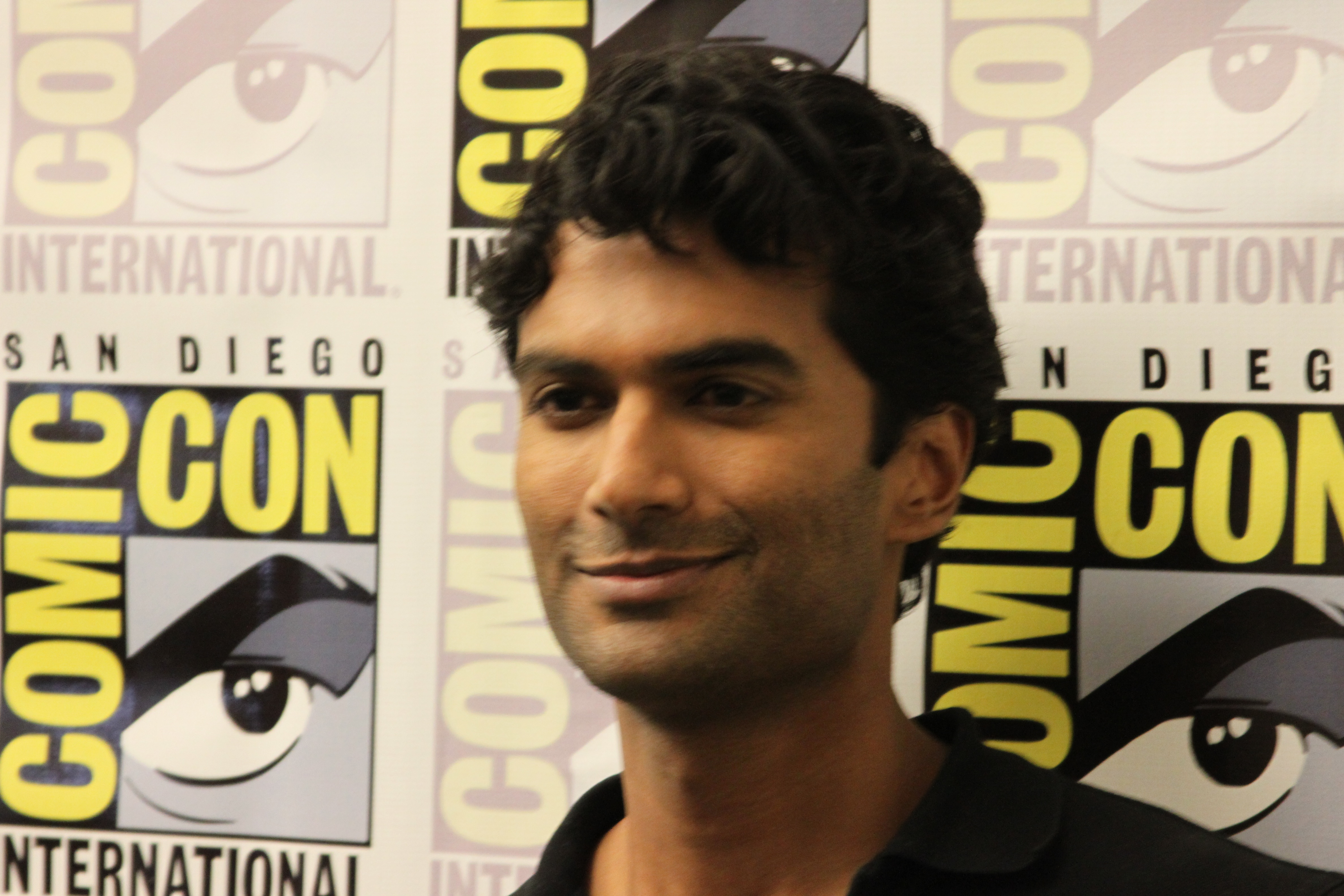
Sendhil Ramamurthy played the role of Gabe.

Gabriel "Gabe" Lowen (Sendhil Ramamurthy) was a former assistant district attorney who came to Catherine's precinct to hunt down Vincent. He was revealed to be a Muirfield experiment, as well. He tries to kill Vincent to save himself, but is inadvertently cured, and becomes human. Gabe takes over Catherine's precinct after Joe Bishop is fired, and tries to make amends by helping Catherine search for Vincent, and who was controlling him. It was revealed that Gabe is falling in love with Catherine. The two ended up dating after Catherine and Vincent broke up, but Catherine later broke up with Gabe, and reunited with Vincent. Gabe became deranged over losing her, and changed back into a beast to kill Vincent. Before he could, he was killed by Catherine in self-defense.

=== Joe Bishop ===
Lieutenant Joe Bishop (Brian White) is the former Commanding Officer of the NYPD 125th Precinct's Special Crimes Unit. He cheated on his wife with Tess. When his brother, Darius, was killed by Vincent (by accident), he became vengeful and intent on finding Darius' killer. His vendetta distracted him from his job and he was fired by the start of season two.

=== Dr. Evan Marks ===
Dr. Evan Marks (Max Brown) was the police medical examiner who worked with Catherine. He also developed romantic feelings for her, but Catherine never took him seriously. When Evan found out that Catherine was in love with Vincent, Evan was angry and jealous. He helped Muirfield capture Vincent, thinking they would kill him and get rid of beasts. However, Evan found out that Muirfield had used him. When Catherine showed up to rescue Vincent, Evan helped them escape by sacrificing himself, getting shot and killed by Muirfield.

=== Tori Windsor ===
Tori Windsor (Amber Skye Noyes) was a beast who was also the daughter of a Muirfield experiment. After Vincent killed her father, she found out she possessed beast abilities, and became attached to Vincent because of this. She tried to form a deeper wedge in the feuding between, and eventually separated, Vincent and Cat because of this attraction; Vincent ended up dated Tori for a while. She lost her life trying to prove herself to Vincent; she died in his arms apologizing, and blessing Vincent's love for Catherine.

== Recurring characters ==
- Rob Stewart as Thomas Chandler (season 1): Catherine and Heather's father. In season 1, Thomas married Brooke, a woman many years younger than him, causing a rift between him and Catherine. In the first-season finale, he was murdered in front of Catherine after being pushed into oncoming traffic by a disguised Muirfield agent; it was later discovered that he was not Catherine's biological father.
- Bridget Regan as Alex Salter (season 1): Vincent's ex-fiancée. After finding out Vincent was still alive, Alex tried to rekindle their relationship, but struggled with Vincent's condition and the realization that he had feelings for Catherine. With Catherine's help, Alex went into hiding from Muirfield.
- Shantel VanSanten as Tyler (season 1): Gabe's girlfriend who helped him deal with his beastly side. She was killed by Reynolds.
- Ted Whittall as Bob Reynolds (seasons 1–3): FBI agent who was in charge of Operation Muirfield. At the end of Season 1, he and his team kidnapped Vincent and wiped his memory. He carried out a personal black operation to eliminate Muirfield, using Vincent as an assassin to hunt down the numerous Beasts it produced, until he was caught by Catherine and sent to jail. He is also revealed to be Catherine's biological father.
- Khaira Ledeyo as Dr. Vanessa Chandler (season 1, 3): Catherine and Heather's mother. Vanessa was a doctor working for Muirfield, and was responsible for turning Vincent Keller into a beast. She was killed by Muirfield in front of Catherine.
- Elisabeth Röhm as Dana Landon (season 2): FBI Agent who was tracking a series of thefts and murders stretching back to the 1800s, all dealing with a specific gem, linked to the murder of her husband Sam and to Catherine's ancestry. Unknown to Landon, the gem is directly tied to the history of Beasts, leading her further into the mystery surrounding Vincent.
- Tom Everett Scott as Sam Landon (season 2): The husband of Dana Landon, Sam found out about beasts after their son died from being experimented on by Muirfield. He faked his death and began creating more beasts in order to get revenge for his son's death.
- Brennan Brown as Captain Ward (seasons 2–3): Tess and Catherine's boss after Gabe vacated the position. Ward helped Tess become captain after he was promoted to chief.
- Jason Gedrick as Liam Cullen (season 3): A beast that has been alive for 200 years. He was romantically involved with Catherine's ancestor Rebecca before she rejected him for Alistair, and was responsible for killing both of them. He was enhanced after being injected with a superhuman serum.
- Andrew Stewart-Jones as Deputy Secretary Hill (season 4): A senior member of Homeland Security who keeps Vincent's secret in return for help with Liam. After he and his family are threatened by bounty hunters searching for Vincent, he hires assassins to kill him. He is killed by Vincent after forcing him to beast out.
- Anastasia Barzee as Special Agent Olivia Dylan (season 4): Homeland Security agent who leads the search for Vincent as a suspected murderer and terrorist.

== See also ==
- List of Beauty & the Beast (2012 TV series) episodes
