= Beauty & the Beast season 2 =

Beauty & the Beast
- Season 2
- DVD cover
- No. of episodes: 22

Release
- Original network: The CW
- Original release: October 7, 2013 – July 7, 2014

Season chronology
- ← Previous; Season 1 Next → Season 3

The second season of Beauty & the Beast, an American television series developed by Sherri Cooper-Landsman and Jennifer Levin and very loosely inspired by the 1987 CBS television series of the same name, commenced airing in the United States on October 7, 2013, concluded July 7, 2014, and consisted of 22 episodes.

Beauty & the Beast's second season aired in the United States (U.S.) on Mondays at 9:00 pm ET on The CW, a terrestrial television network, where it received an average of 1.24 million viewers per episode.

== Premise ==
Catherine Chandler, a law student, witnesses her mother being shot the same night she is saved from her mother's murderers by a supposed beast. Nine years later, and now working as a detective for the NYPD, a case leads her to discover that Vincent Keller, an ex-soldier believed to have been killed in action during military service, is actually alive. As Catherine gets to know him, she starts finding out more about her mother's murder and about who (and what) Vincent really is. At the same time, they get to know one another and eventually fall in love.

=== Plot ===
Vincent was captured by Muirfield, an underground government organization that has been hunting him, in the previous season finale. Cat, the woman whom he has fallen in love with and who accepts what he has been changed into by Muirfield, will do anything to find him. This season, their love faces more challenges than ever before.

During the season, Vincent and Cat briefly break up with each other, due to Vincent having changed so much because of Muirfield wiping his memory. Cat starts a relationship with Gabe, a previous beast, now turned ally, while Vincent starts to date Tori, a wealthy socialite who has discovered that she is also a Beast. Eventually, after regaining his memories and Tori's death during the season, Vincent realizes that he is still in love with Cat and tries to win her back, but she rejects his advances. However, slowly she starts to realize that she still loves him and they both get back together near the end of the season.

However, Gabe does not take the break up very well and starts to become obsessed with hunting down Vincent, by framing him for murder. He tries to hide his jealousy by claiming Vincent is dangerous, and he is only trying to protect Cat, while at the same time trying to win her back. However, he becomes more dangerous, as he suspends both Cat and Tess from the police force, becomes more ruthless and even goes so far as to kidnapping Cat's sister Heather, who then later learns Vincent's secret. However things become much worse after Gabe becomes a Beast again and starts killing those closest to Cat and Vincent. A final showdown will come between them finally ending the feud once and for all which could possibly end Vincent's life.

== Cast ==
=== Main ===
- Kristin Kreuk as Catherine "Cat" Chandler
- Jay Ryan as Vincent Keller
- Austin Basis as J.T. Forbes
- Nina Lisandrello as Tess Vargas
- Sendhil Ramamurthy as Gabriel 'Gabe' Lowen
- Amber Skye Noyes as Tori Windsor (Note: Noyes was credited as main cast from episodes 6–12.)

=== Recurring ===
- Ted Whittall as Bob Reynolds
- Tom Everett Scott as Sam Landon
- Brennan Brown as Captain Ward
- Nicole Gale Anderson as Heather Chandler
- Elisabeth Röhm as Dana Landon
- Anthony Ruivivar as Agent Henry Knox
- Mark Taylor as Agent Tucker
- Annie Ilonzeh as Beth Bowman
- Riley Smith as The Bombmaker

== Production ==
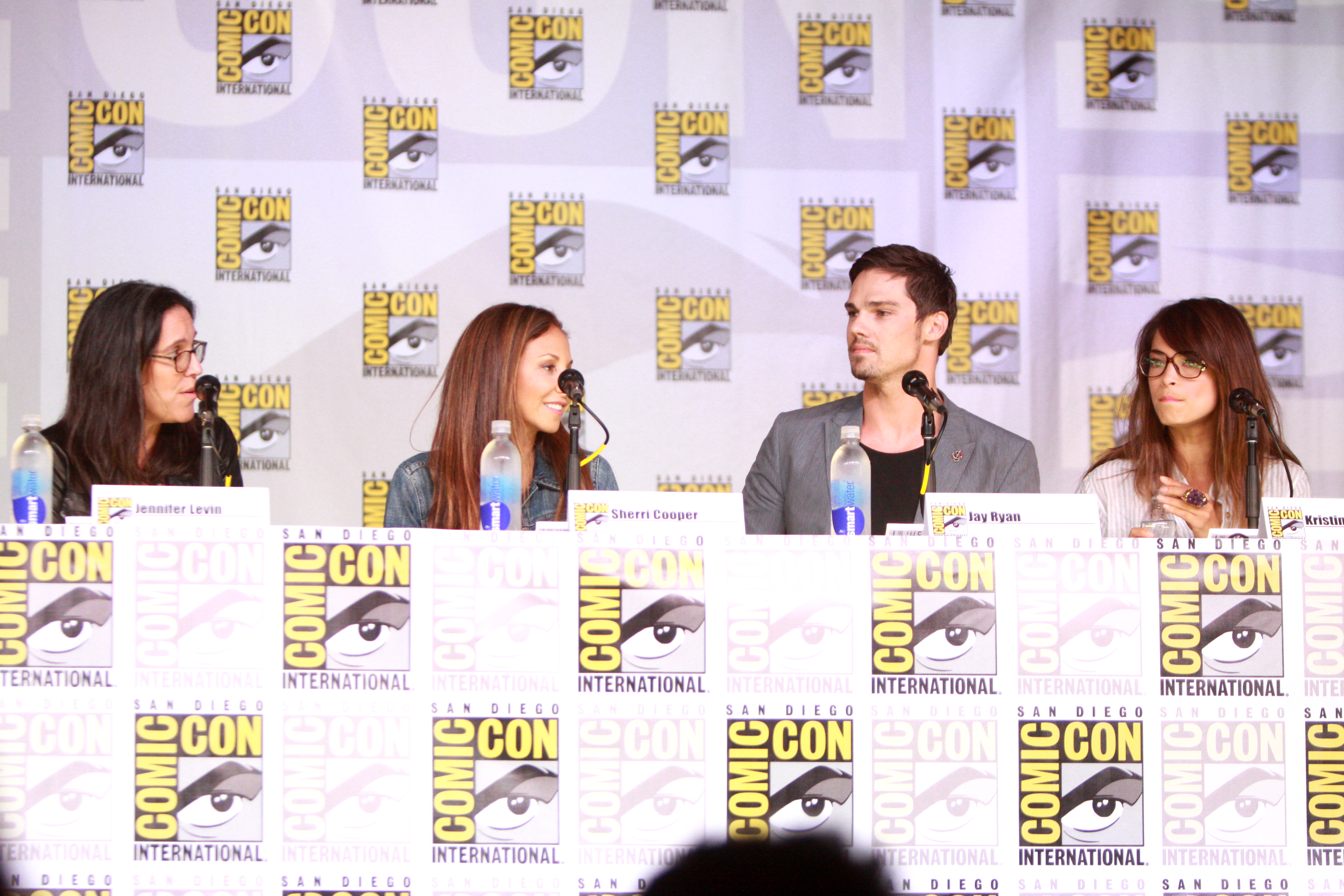
The cast and creators at San Diego Comic-Con

On April 26, 2013, Beauty & the Beast was renewed for a second season of 22 episodes. Filming of Beauty & the Beast was split between New York City, NY and Toronto, Ontario, Canada from the second season.

=== Casting ===
Brian White's character, Joe Bishop, was not included in the second season of the series; the storyline was that Bishop lost his job because he focused too much attention on finding the killer of his brother instead of performing his duties. Ted Whittall, having briefly appeared in the final episode of season one where he revealed himself to be Cat's biological father, announced that he would return for season two in the recurring role of Bob Reynolds on July 8, 2013. On September 6, 2013, it was announced that Annie Ilonzeh would be joining the cast of Beauty & the Beast for the show's upcoming second season, playing the role of Beth Bowman, a journalist and an old friend of Catherine Chandler's. On September 10, 2013, it was reported that Amber Skye Noyes had been cast as Tori Windsor, the innocent daughter of a powerful beast who is rescued by Cat and Vincent. On November 12, 2013, Law & Order actress Elisabeth Röhm was cast as Dana Landon, a woman who joins forces with Cat on an investigation into a series of undercover operations. On December 4, 2013, Tom Everett Scott joined the cast of the show, playing the recurring role of Sam Landon, an archaeologist with a short fuse who has been isolated from the outside world for many years.

== Episodes ==
No. overall	No. in season	Title	Directed by	Written by	Original release date	US viewers (millions)
23	1	"Who Am I?"	Stuart Gillard	Brad Kern	October 7, 2013	0.86
Three months after Vincent Keller was abducted by Muirfield, Catherine is reunited with him – but not in the way she planned. He's changed: his scar has disappeared, his memory has been wiped clean and he returns as a supercharged beast on a mysterious mission. Catherine needs to unravel the reasons behind Vincent's change if she has any hopes of recovering their epic love, while also trying to solve the secrets that swirl around her own life.
24	2	"Kidnapped"	Rick Bota	Jennifer Levin & Sherri Cooper	October 14, 2013	0.90
While attempting to learn more about Vincent's mission, Cat gets kidnapped by him. Their growing chemistry complicates things. Meanwhile, Tess, J.T. and Gabe come together to help Cat.
25	3	"Liar, Liar"	Bradley Walsh	John A. Norris	October 21, 2013	0.82
Cat and Vincent track a mysterious beast while keeping their individual agendas from one another in a clever game of cat-and-mouse. Meanwhile, Heather has a bombshell revelation for Cat, and Tess confronts Gabe about his real motives for helping Cat.
26	4	"Hothead"	Michael Robison	Roger Grant	October 28, 2013	0.83
Cat and Tess's night on the town goes awry when Cat gets into a fight. Meanwhile, Gabe is chasing a criminal setting fires in Manhattan who he later realizes is a beast. Vincent tries to attack him as part of his mission, but has the disadvantage - the opposing beast is not hurt by fire. Having been sent to hospital, Vincent uses a false alias, where a chance meeting with his nephew, Aaron, triggers more memories. When the firemen locate the beast's location, Aaron tries to take it down by himself, putting his and Vincent's lives on the line.
27	5	"Reunion"	Fred Gerber	Eric Tuchman	November 4, 2013	0.68
Cat gets a blast from the past when she attends her high school reunion, where she uncovers more of her past than she ever anticipated. Meanwhile, Vincent meets up with one of his old military friends who hides a very dangerous secret.
28	6	"Father Knows Best"	Paul Kaufman	Brad Kern & Roger Grant	November 11, 2013	0.75
Cat confronts her birth father about the mysterious role he has played in her life, while Vincent has to neutralize a high-profile beast. In the process of doing so, Vincent finds himself rescuing Tori, a damsel in distress, who may be the key to completing his mission.
29	7	"Guess Who's Coming to Dinner?"	Jeff Renfroe	Wendy Straker Hauser	November 18, 2013	0.68
After Vincent's life is endangered, Cat decides they should spend Thanksgiving with her father in order to get information on Vincent's missions. However, when Gabe and Tori join the festivities, true feelings are revealed and secrets are outed. Meanwhile, J.T. and Tess get a surprise while they celebrate Thanksgiving together.
30	8	"Man or Beast?"	Stuart Gillard	John A. Norris	November 25, 2013	0.74
Vincent and Cat find themselves at odds on how to deal with Agent Reynolds, which forces Vincent to wonder if he is more beast than man. Cat shoots Vincent and ruins their relationship.
31	9	"Don't Die on Me"	Mairzee Almas	Eric Tuchman	January 13, 2014	0.71
Unrepentant about the shooting, Cat helps protect Tori when her life is threatened, revealing a new, unexpected mystery. Meanwhile, Vincent's efforts leads to life-changing consequences, which causes Gabe and Cat to grow closer.
32	10	"Ancestors"	Steven A. Adelson	Roger Grant & Rupa Magge	January 20, 2014	0.74
A skeleton belonging to Tori's father reveals more about the Beast DNA than anyone could have ever imagined. Both Cat and Vincent try to locate a mysterious gem following these revelations, but with different motives. A link between Cat's ancestor's, the gem and the Beasts is later revealed, raising even more questions.
33	11	"Held Hostage"	Sudz Sutherland	Pamela Sue Anton	January 27, 2014	0.82
A group of criminals looking to steal a rare necklace in Tori's possession takes Cat, Tori and Tess hostage at the precinct, leaving Vincent as their only hope for help. Vincent is forced to make a decision, leave them to die and keep his identity anonymous or help save them, risking revealing his true identity to the entire police force.
34	12	"Recipe for Disaster"	Allan Kroeker	Brad Kern & Wendy Straker Hauser	February 3, 2014	0.93
Cat and Vincent must work together to save J.T. when he gets kidnapped, while Tori attempts to intervene, with fatal consequences. Meanwhile, a stranger from FBI Agent Dana Landon's past is rescued along with J.T., and might have some insight about Vincent's beastly past.
35	13	"Till Death"	Stuart Gillard	Story by : Roger Grant; Teleplay by : Sherri Cooper & Jennifer Levin	February 10, 2014	0.74
In an effort to track down Sam's captor, Vincent and Cat have to work together on Valentine's Day.
36	14	"Redemption"	Grant Harvey	John A. Norris	February 17, 2014	0.77
When some of Gabe's acquaintances go missing, Cat and Vincent must come together to save them. Vincent ends up returning to the hospital where he was an intern, allowing him to see what his life could have been.
37	15	"Catch Me if You Can"	Norma Bailey	Eric Tuchman	March 3, 2014	0.87
Sam Landon injects a young orphaned boy at Muirfield with the serum that will turn him into a Beast, wanting him to help him find the people that killed one of his own. Vincent tracks him, but must face off against his Beast side and Catherine, who has been following the same lead. When the case is closed, Vincent and Catherine struggle with their feelings for each other.
38	16	"About Last Night"	Stuart Gillard	Melissa Glenn	March 10, 2014	0.80
Cat and Vincent are revealed to have slept together, but both share different views on what will come of it. Sam, now imprisoned, is angrier than ever before and will not rest until his targets are assassinated. In the end though, Vincent and Catherine realize that they are still in love with each other and finally get back together, later the next day however, Vincent is arrested for murder.
39	17	"Beast is the New Black"	Fred Gerber	Sherri Cooper & Jennifer Levin	June 2, 2014	1.06
After Vincent is arrested for murder, Cat and her friends must work together to clear Vincent's name. When they discover who turned Vincent in, they realize that bringing them down will be the tougher than they first thought.
40	18	"Cat and Mouse"	Jeff Renfroe	Story by : Amy Van Curen; Teleplay by : Brad Kern	June 9, 2014	0.87
A city-wide manhunt is out on Vincent. Fearing for his safety, both Cat and Vincent try to stay below the radar. But, unexpectedly, a new FBI ally approaches them about helping on a high-profile case that could help Vincent get his life back.
41	19	"Cold Case"	Rich Newey	John A. Norris & Eric Tuchman	June 16, 2014	0.76
Cat's sister Heather drops by for a surprise visit, just as Gabe suspends Cat and Tess from the squad in an effort to force Vincent out of hiding.
42	20	"Ever After"	Steven A. Adelson	Vanessa Rojas	June 23, 2014	0.75
Cat and Vincent take Agent Knox's offer to extricate and try to lead normal lives — but forces out of their control conspire to expose them and drag them back into the fray when an unexpected murder happens.
43	21	"Operation Fake Date"	Fred Gerber	Sherri Cooper & Jennifer Levin	June 30, 2014	0.84
Desperate to start over with Cat, Gabe tries to woo her by taking her on a romantic date. However, she only wants to save Vincent.
44	22	"Déjà Vu"	Stuart Gillard	Brad Kern & Roger Grant	July 7, 2014	0.76
Cat searches for a way to thwart Gabe and finds her answer in an unexpected place: the journal of her ancestor, which makes Cat fear the only way to stop Gabe is by killing Vincent. In a final showdown, their love will be tested like never before.

== Reception ==
Shirley Li of Entertainment Weekly gave the second season of Beauty & the Beast a score of 42 out of 100, where 0 out of 100 is the lowest possible score and 100 is the highest, on Metacritic. Li commented that the "love story-slash-procedural returns with a Cat and, well, Beast chase that's more dull than thrilling". The great romance and love story left the second season and we're left with another boring crime dreams, the show died because of that change.

=== U.S. Nielsen ratings ===
No.	Title	Air date	Viewers (in millions)	18–49 Rating/Share
1	Who Am I?	October 7, 2013	0.86	0.3/1
2	Kidnapped	October 14, 2013	0.90	0.3/1
3	Liar, Liar	October 21, 2013	0.82	0.3/2
4	Hothead	October 28, 2013	0.83	0.3/1
5	Reunion	November 4, 2013	0.68	0.3/1
6	Father Knows Best	November 11, 2013	0.75	0.3/1
7	Guess Who's Coming to Dinner?	November 18, 2013	0.68	0.3/1
8	Man or Beast?	November 25, 2013	0.74	0.3/1
9	Don't Die on Me	January 13, 2014	0.71	0.3/1
10	Ancestors	January 20, 2014	0.74	0.3/1
11	Held Hostage	January 27, 2014	0.82	0.3/1
12	Recipe for Disaster	February 3, 2014	0.93	0.4/1
13	Till Death	February 10, 2014	0.74	0.3/1
14	Redemption	February 17, 2014	0.77	0.3/1
15	Catch Me if You Can	March 3, 2014	0.87	0.3/1
16	About Last Night	March 10, 2014	0.80	0.2/1
17	Beast is the New Black	June 2, 2014	1.06	0.4/1
18	Cat and Mouse	June 9, 2014	0.87	0.3/1
19	Cold Case	June 16, 2014	0.76	0.3/1
20	Ever After	June 23, 2014	0.75	0.3/1
21	Operation Fake Date	June 30, 2014	0.84	0.3/1
22	Déjà Vu	July 7, 2014	0.76	0.3/1

== DVD release ==
Release dates			Ep #	Additional information
Region 1	Region 2	Region 4	Ep #	Additional information
May 19, 2015	March 9, 2015	April, 2015 (Brazil); December 3, 2015 (Australia)	22	Features; Season in Review: The Beast is Back; From Script to Screen: Creating an Episode; Set Tour: The Gentleman's Club; Deleted Scenes; Gag Reel
