= Beauty & the Beast season 1 =

Beauty & the Beast
- Season 1
- DVD cover
- No. of episodes: 22

Release
- Original network: The CW
- Original release: October 11, 2012 – May 16, 2013

Season chronology
- Next → Season 2

The first season of Beauty & the Beast, an American television series developed by Sherri Cooper-Landsman and Jennifer Levin and very loosely inspired by the 1987 CBS television series of the same name, commenced airing in the United States on October 11, 2012, concluded May 16, 2013, and consisted of 22 episodes.

Beauty & the Beast's first season aired in the United States (U.S.) on Thursdays at 9:00 pm ET on The CW, a terrestrial television network, where it received an average of 1.78 million viewers per episode.

== Premise ==
Catherine Chandler, a law student, witnesses her mother being shot the same night she is saved from her mother's murderers by a supposed beast. Nine years later, and now working as a detective for the NYPD, a case leads her to discover that Vincent Keller, an ex-soldier believed to have been killed in action during military service, is actually alive. As Catherine gets to know him, she starts finding out more about her mother's murder and about who (and what) Vincent really is. At the same time, they get to know one another and eventually fall in love.

=== Plot ===
This season revolves around Catherine and Vincent trying to pursue a relationship together, whilst being hunted down by a top-secret government organization named Muirfield who want Vincent dead. Muirfield are revealed to have conducted a high-profile secret experiment on soldiers fighting in Afghanistan. These experiments resulted in every soldier becoming physically stronger and faster, hoping this would win the war quicker. But, something went wrong, as the entire force went out of control with their new abilities. The government gave orders to kill them all, but Vincent escaped and has been in hiding ever since. Muirfield make several attempts to capture Vincent during this season, and even enlist the help of Cat and those close to her to capture him.

Catherine's family history is delved into in this first season, as her mother's unsolved murder has preyed on her mind for nine years. Catherine witnessed her mother shot and killed by two hitmen who were then killed by Vincent. Catherine refused to believe the official police report that her mother's death was that of carjacking gone wrong since the men who killed her mother suddenly appeared and began shooting without saying a word, as well as that the two dead killers identities were never found in any police record, leading Catherine to believe that her mother's killing was that of a government conspiracy. It was later revealed that Catherine's mother worked for Muirfield, conducting the experiments, and ultimately helped turn Vincent into a beast. Catherine must deal with conflicted feelings of her mother's memory across this season, having been determined to solve her case for all this time. When Catherine watches her father get run over in the season finale, she then learns that, biologically, he was not her real father after all.

Vincent's DNA mutates as the season progresses, as he becomes more beast-like. He begins experiencing black-outs, which J.T. associates with Catherine's interference. Cat and Vincent will stop at nothing to see each other, however. Assistant District Attorney Gabriel Lowen visits Cat's precinct to investigate the beast-like attack in the city and over time he reveals that not only does he know about Muirfield but that he shares the same ability as Vincent. At first an enemy, Gabriel goes on to become an ally to Vincent by the end of the first season and suggests he has found a cure to the virus inflicted on them by Muirfield. Vincent ultimately wonders if he wants to be cured or not.

Vincent is captured in the season finale as a helicopter drops a net on him and flies him away, leaving Catherine heartbroken. With Vincent captured, a gun is then aimed at Catherine's head. But, someone orders them not to shoot; Agent Bob Reynolds –Catherine's biological father.

== Cast ==
=== Main ===
- Kristin Kreuk as Catherine "Cat" Chandler
- Jay Ryan as Vincent Keller
- Max Brown as Evan Marks (Note: Brown was credited as main cast from episodes 1-18.)
- Sendhil Ramamurthy as Gabriel Lowan (Note: Ramamurthy was credited as main cast from episodes 15-22.)
- Austin Basis as J.T. Forbes
- Nina Lisandrello as Tess Vargas
- Brian White as Joe Bishop

=== Recurring ===
- Nicole Gale Anderson as Heather Chandler
- Rob Stewart as Thomas Chandler
- Bridget Regan as Alex Salter
- Shantel VanSanten as Tyler
- Edi Gathegi as Kyle
- Khaira Ledeyo as Dr. Vanessa Chandler
- Ty Olsson as Garnett
- Rachel Skarsten as Brooke Chandler
- Christian Keyes as Darius Bishop
- Ted Whittall as Agent Bob Reynolds

== Episodes ==
No. overall	No. in season	Title	Directed by	Written by	Original release date	US viewers (millions)
1	1	"Pilot"	Gary Fleder	Sherri Cooper & Jennifer Levin	October 11, 2012	2.78
In the autumn of 2003, 19-year-old Catherine Chandler’s mother Vanessa was killed by two unknown hitmen; those men chased Catherine into the woods to kill her, too, but she was saved by a mysterious humanoid beast. In 2012, Catherine, now a successful New York police detective, is still plagued by memories of that mysterious beast as well as her mother's unsolved murder. During a murder investigation, Cat finds fingerprints of deceased doctor Vincent Keller on the corpse. Cat finds an address for the last known whereabouts of Vincent Keller and discovers him hiding away inside, under the protection of his friend J.T., very much alive. Vincent begs her to keep his hideaway a secret. Cat does so, but, what Vincent seems to be hiding from, appears to now be targeting her. Vincent must save Catherine when she is attacked by hitmen in a subway tunnel, after they promise her new information on her mother’s case. In the darkness of the subway tunnels, with her body pinned against his, Catherine realizes that Vincent Keller is the one who saved her life nine years ago.
2	2	"Proceed with Caution"	Rick Bota	Sherri Cooper & Jennifer Levin	October 18, 2012	2.00
When a ballerina is murdered, Cat investigates possible suspects with her detective partner Tess. Vincent masks that he is keeping tabs on her, when he appears out of nowhere with a lead for Cat to follow.
3	3	"All In"	P. J. Pesce	Jeff Rake	October 25, 2012	1.88
A judge is murdered and the person Cat thinks is responsible is innocent according to Vincent. J.T. tells Cat that there are better ways of communicating with Vincent to ensure their cover isn’t blown.
4	4	"Basic Instinct"	Bradley Walsh	Roger Grant	November 1, 2012	1.70
Vincent revives a teenager whom Cat discovers has a history of bone fractures. Silverfox, the agent in charge of ensuring the truth about Vincent never gets out, kidnaps Cat and makes her an offer: trade in Vincent in exchange for information about her mother’s death. After her recent visit to Muirfield, she wonders if Muirfield is right about Vincent; This causes Vincent to turn himself in, because it has cause Cat to doubt him. In the end, Cat and JT come to his rescue.
5	5	"Saturn Returns"	Steven A. Adelson	Story by : Blair Singer; Teleplay by : Blair Singer & Kelly Souders	November 8, 2012	1.84
Cat investigates when a woman due to get married goes on the run and must also erase footage of Vincent after he is caught on camera stopping a robbery. Heather throws her sister a surprise birthday party. Vincent arrives as the party is in full swing and witnesses Evan, the medical examiner, sharing a kiss with Cat. Cat tells Vincent that she would like to prepare dinner for him the very next day. As Cat lights a candle and waits for him, staring longingly out of her open window, she is unaware that Vincent has blacked out on his way to her apartment. Cat blows the candles out as Vincent comes to, now on top of the Brooklyn Bridge.
6	6	"Worth"	Kevin Fair	Allison Moore	November 15, 2012	1.56
Cat’s step-mom turns up and Cat’s attempts to bond with her could be wasted when she spots her kissing another man. Cat and Tess investigate the murder of an artist whose paintings are being used to front a high-end escort service. Vincent blacks out again and this time he’s covered in someone else’s blood.
7	7	"Out of Control"	Rick Bota	Brian Peterson & Kelly Souders	November 29, 2012	1.52
The death of a fraternity boy shows all the markings of a beast-like attack. Having found a clue that leads to the real killer, Evan is kidnapped. Cat begs Vincent for help, unaware of how frequent his blackouts have become. Vincent transforms into a beast as they hunt for Evan and when Cat cannot bring herself to stop him, Vincent ends up killing Evan’s kidnapper in front of both Evan and Cat. Vincent runs off, into the night, leaving Cat to pick up the pieces and for her precinct to put capturing Vincent as their main priority. Cat goes to tell Vincent this news but finds he has locked himself in a cage, now J.T. has found the cause of his blackouts: her.
8	8	"Trapped"	Paul Fox	Emily Silver	December 6, 2012	1.41
Vincent recalls memories from his past, whilst Tess and Cat investigate an attempt on the life of a teenage pop star. J.T. and Cat try to find a remedy from her mother's journal for Vincent's blackouts. Vincent takes the serum, despite not knowing what it will do to him. In the end the serum works; now Cat and Vincent can continue seeing each other.
9	9	"Bridesmaid Up!"	Mairzee Almas	Sherri Cooper & Jennifer Levin	December 13, 2012	1.59
Vincent’s increased sense of smell leads him to Catherine’s next crime scene. Cat is pursued to bring a plus one to her father’s nuptials. Even when the risk is so great, Vincent offers. As everything starts to feel normal, a drunken Heather tells Cat that Evan let slip about his research on mutated DNA. Cat realizes Evan has samples of Vincent’s DNA and is stunned by what he tells her. Catherine must find Vincent to tell him the news. However, another vehicle comes up behind her and runs her off the road. The assailant steps out of their car and shoots Catherine, but Cat shoots back. Vincent comes to her rescue but, as he tries to pull her out of her smashed car, another vehicle, driven by Evan and Heather, is fast approaching.
10	10	"Seeing Red"	Rick Bota	Roger Grant	January 24, 2013	1.79
Vincent runs off into the night, leaving Cat in the hands of Evan, as she lay unconscious in the middle of the road. Vincent runs into his former fiancée and he and Cat soon discover she too may be being tracked by Muirfield. J.T. gets a call from Evan regarding a paper J.T. did years ago on mutant DNA and must ward him off of continuing his research without arousing suspicion.
11	11	"On Thin Ice"	Mike Rohl	Blair Singer	January 31, 2013	1.72
While Catherine is still recovering from the gunshot wound off-duty, Vincent struggles with his feelings for Cat and fond memories of his old life with Alex. J.T. and Muirfield goes to extreme lengths to stop Evan presenting his findings to anybody.
12	12	"Cold Turkey"	Fred Gerber	Allison Moore	February 7, 2013	1.48
Vincent and Alex are on a romantic getaway in a cabin, when Catherine interrupts, despite her promise to let Vincent decide for himself what he wants. Muirfield arrives and because of Vincent turning into a beast to save him and Catherine, he loses Alex because she realizes that he is not the man she fell in love with. Cat help sends her away, so she will be safe from Muirfield. Vincent tries to make things right with Catherine, but she tells him she will help protect him; however because he was possibly going to leave her for Alex and his old life, she tells him she needs some time to heal first, before she can trust him again. Evan discovers a bug in his office, which makes him start to believe J.T.'s earlier warnings.
13	13	"Trust No One"	Bobby Roth	Brian Peterson & Kelly Souders	February 14, 2013	1.40
Vincent tries to woo Catherine on Valentine's Day. Catherine gives in to him eventually, only to have the moment spoiled by her sister.
14	14	"Tough Love"	Bradley Walsh	Don Whitehead & Holly Henderson	February 21, 2013	1.52
After an awkward double date with Darius and Vincent, Heather gets suspicious of Vincent and enlists the help of Tess to find out more about "Vincent Zalanski". Joe's brother, Darius, unintentionally gets Heather and himself in big trouble and it is Vincent who suffers the consequences.
15	15	"Any Means Possible"	Steven A. Adelson	Roger Grant	March 14, 2013	1.43
Catherine and Vincent grow closer as they collaborate to track down a witness, hoping to clear Vincent's name. They find the witness they are looking for, and force him to clear Vincent's name; however, after they leave, an unknown assliant kills the witness, before Vincent's name is clear. Evan starts to wonder about his role in Muirfield. First appearance of: Sendhil Ramamurthy
16	16	"Insatiable"	Lee Rose	Blair Singer	March 21, 2013	1.72
As Cat and Vincent take their relationship further, they are brought back to reality when it appears there is a copy-cat mimicking Vincent. Evan grows even more suspicious of Cat. Muirfield are close to catching Vincent, and with no escape, J.T. and Cat must take a big risk. They succeed in faking Vincent's death, but not before Evan tips off Muirfield on where Vincent is. They escape, but Tess finds vincent in the tunnels and starts chasing him. During his transformation, Tess shoots him, just as Catherine arrives.
17	17	"Partners in Crime"	Rick Rosenthal	Emily Silver	March 28, 2013	1.50
Cat is forced to tell Tess the truth about Vincent. Tess at first tries to convince Cat to turn Vincent in, but she refuses, forcing Tess to call for backup. The backup, however, are associates of Gabe, who instead shoot Tess and leave her for dead. Catherine and Vincent stop the men and rescue Tess from drowning. Gabe interrogates the entire precinct, hoping to find whoever is more connected to the vigilante's case than they are letting on. When Gabe goes looking for his friends because Tess lied about what happen to her boss, he finds evidence of Vincent being alive.
18	18	"Heart of Darkness"	Scott Peters	Roger Grant & Blair Singer	April 18, 2013	1.59
Evan confesses his love for Cat, admitting that he was the one who tipped off Muirfield on Vincent's whereabouts. Cat is stunned. Evan comes to realize that Muirfield lied to him and soon has a decision to make as Vincent and Cat are both in danger. Evan, in the end, sacrifices his life, allowing Vincent to get Cat to safety. Meanwhile, Gabe finally finds evidence connecting somebody in the precinct to the vigilante.
19	19	"Playing with Fire"	Mike Rohl	Brian Studler	April 25, 2013	1.24
Gabe reveals a big secret to Cat: he knows about Muirfield. Vincent is wary of anything he says. J.T. and Vincent find a new hideaway.
20	20	"Anniversary"	Mairzee Almas	Holly Henderson & Don Whitehead	May 2, 2013	1.23
On the anniversary of her mother's death, Cat asks Gabe to attend her family's annual remembrance of Vanessa, making Vincent jealous. Cat finds some information that makes her think her mom might still be alive and when a sniper shoots the mayor at a public event, Vincent finds evidence that links Gabe to the sniper.
21	21	"Date Night"	Kevin Fair	Story by : Roger Grant; Teleplay by : Sherri Cooper & Jennifer Levin	May 9, 2013	1.29
Cat and Vincent go on a date in public in an attempt to be a normal couple, which backfires. Gabe reveals some information that gives Cat hope they can cure Vincent.
22	22	"Never Turn Back"	Rick Bota	Kelly Souders & Brian Peterson	May 16, 2013	1.26
When secrets about Cat's family are revealed, it will change everything Cat knew about her past. Vincent finds himself staring his demise in the face; while Gabe takes drastic measures to get some answers.

== Reception ==
The first season was given a 33 out of 100 score on Metacritic, indicating "generally unfavorable" reviews from 19 critics.

=== Ratings ===
Viewership and ratings per episode of Beauty & the Beast season 1
No.	Title	Air date	Rating/share (18–49)	Viewers (millions)
1	"Pilot"	October 11, 2012	1.2/3	2.78
2	"Proceed with Caution"	October 18, 2012	0.7/2	2.00
3	"All In"	October 25, 2012	0.6/2	1.88
4	"Basic Instinct"	November 1, 2012	0.6/2	1.70
5	"Saturn Returns"	November 8, 2012	0.7/2	1.84
6	"Worth"	November 15, 2012	0.6/2	1.56
7	"Out of Control"	November 29, 2012	0.6/1	1.52
8	"Trapped"	December 6, 2012	0.5/1	1.41
9	"Bridesmaid Up!"	December 13, 2012	0.6/1	1.59
10	"Seeing Red"	January 24, 2013	0.7/2	1.79
11	"On Thin Ice"	January 31, 2013	0.7/2	1.72
12	"Cold Turkey"	February 7, 2013	0.6/1	1.48
13	"Trust No One"	February 14, 2013	0.5/1	1.40
14	"Tough Love"	February 21, 2013	0.5/1	1.52
15	"Any Means Possible"	February 28, 2013	0.5/1	1.43
16	"Insatiable"	March 14, 2013	0.6/2	1.72
17	"Partners in Crime"	March 21, 2013	0.6/2	1.50
18	"Heart of Darkness"	April 18, 2013	0.6/2	1.59
19	"Playing with Fire"	April 25, 2013	0.5/1	1.24
20	"Anniversary"	May 2, 2013	0.5/1	1.23
21	"Date Night"	May 9, 2013	0.5/1	1.29
22	"Never Turn Back"	May 16, 2013	0.5/1	1.26

== DVD release ==
Release dates			Ep #	Additional information
Region 1	Region 2	Region 4	Ep #	Additional information
October 1, 2013	March 10, 2014	January 7, 2014 (Brazil); April 23, 2014 (Australia)	22	Features: Season in Review: The Beginning; Dressing the Beauty; Creating the Beast; Deleted Scenes; Gag Reel; Commentary on "Pilot"
