= Beauty & the Beast season 4 =

Beauty & the Beast
- Season 4
- DVD cover
- No. of episodes: 13

Release
- Original network: The CW
- Original release: June 2 – September 15, 2016

Season chronology
- ← Previous; Season 3

The fourth and final season of Beauty & the Beast (an American television series developed by Sherri Cooper-Landsman and Jennifer Levin and very loosely inspired by the 1987 CBS television series of the same name) consists of 13 episodes. It premiered in the United States on The CW on June 2, 2016.

== Cast ==
=== Main ===
- Kristin Kreuk as Catherine "Cat" Chandler
- Jay Ryan as Vincent Keller
- Austin Basis as J.T. Forbes
- Nina Lisandrello as Tess Vargas
- Nicole Gale Anderson as Heather Chandler
- Michael Roark as Kyle Johnson

=== Recurring ===
- Andrew Stewart-Jones as Deputy Secretary Hill
- Melissa Tang as Grace Rose
- Tahmoh Penikett as Kane
- Anastasia Barzee as Special Agent Olivia Dylan
- Dayo Ade as Dawes
- Marc Singer as Peter Braxton

== Production ==
On February 13, 2015, The CW renewed the series for a fourth season. On October 13, 2015, it was announced that the fourth season of Beauty & the Beast would be the final season. Filming began on May 29, 2015, and ended on November 17, 2015.

=== Casting ===
Max Brown, who starred as Dr. Evan Marks during the first season, is returning for a guest appearance in season four. TVLine reported that the show is adding another main character named Kyle, an EMT in his mid-20s.

== Episodes ==
| No. overall | No. in season | Title | Directed by | Written by | Original release date | US viewers (millions) |
|---|---|---|---|---|---|---|
| 58 | 1 | "Monsieur et Madame Bête" | Stuart Gillard | Brad Kern | June 2, 2016 | 0.83 |
Cat and Vincent's honeymoon is cut short after J.T. realizes that a blogger's sensational story on beasts may lead to Vincent's exposure.
| 59 | 2 | "Beast Interrupted" | Rich Newey | Lara Olsen | June 9, 2016 | 0.76 |
Cat and Vincent must protect a heiress whose identity has been exposed due to a DHS hack while also tracking down the beast black-market buyer.
| 60 | 3 | "Down for the Count" | Don McCutcheon | Benjamin Raab & Deric A. Hughes | June 16, 2016 | 0.79 |
Vincent and Cat's pursuit of the beast bounty hunter leads them to an underground fight club. J.T. struggles to tell Tess the truth about his job.
| 61 | 4 | "Something's Gotta Give" | Steven A. Adelson | John E. Pogue | June 23, 2016 | 0.83 |
As she starts her new DHS job, Cat wonders if she's pregnant. Meanwhile, Vincent hunts down a dangerous lead, and J.T. tries to outsmart the bloggers.
| 62 | 5 | "It's a Wonderful Beast" | Stuart Gillard | Melissa Glenn | June 30, 2016 | 0.76 |
After failing a fight with the mercenaries, a feverish, guilt-ridden Vincent hallucinates about how Cat's life might be different without him.
| 63 | 6 | "Beast of Times, Worst of Times" | Norma Bailey | Patti Carr | July 7, 2016 | 0.77 |
Cat and Vincent follow a lead from Hill and search for Vincent's former commander, a known beast killer, while also being pursued by a TV reporter.
| 64 | 7 | "Point of No Return" | Jill Carter | Gillian Horvath | July 14, 2016 | 0.72 |
Cat must prove to a suspicious DHS that she can still be trusted, while the now fugitive Vincent uses himself as bait to get inside a private army.
| 65 | 8 | "Love is a Battlefield" | Farhad Mann | Vanessa Rojas | July 21, 2016 | 0.73 |
Cat continues her deception at the DHS, as Vincent, playing the betrayed outsider, works to convince the bounty hunters to add him to their crew.
| 66 | 9 | "The Getaway" | Stuart Gillard | Benjamin Raab & Deric A. Hughes | July 28, 2016 | 0.71 |
As the TV reporter confronts Cat, Vincent tries to glean information about the beast buyer while planning his own capture with the Graydal team.
| 67 | 10 | "Means to an End" | David MacLeod | Melissa Glenn | August 11, 2016 | 0.61 |
DHS hunts for Vincent at Graydal, unaware that Braxton is holding him captive in order to run a series of "beast tests" on him for the secret buyer.
| 68 | 11 | "Meet the New Beast" | David Makin | Patti Carr & Lara Olsen | August 25, 2016 | 0.67 |
Cat's plan to exonerate Vincent by bringing in the second beast goes awry, forcing the couple to consider new identities and life on the run.
| 69 | 12 | "No Way Out" | P.J. Pesce | Austin Badgett & Gillian Horvath | September 8, 2016 | 0.70 |
When Cat learns DHS suspects the imprisoned Vincent is behind an impending terror attack, she vows to find out who is trying to set him up.
| 70 | 13 | "Au Revoir" | Stuart Gillard | Story by : Michael Gemballa; Teleplay by : Brad Kern | September 15, 2016 | 0.70 |
Before leaving New York for their new life together, Cat and Vincent pledge to find Braxton and his prince accomplice and stop the terrorist attack.

== Reception ==
=== U.S. Nielsen ratings ===
| No. | Title | Air date | Timeslot (EST) | Viewers (in millions) | 18–49 Rating/Share |
|---|---|---|---|---|---|
| 1 | "Monsieur et Madame Bête" | June 2, 2016 | Thursday 9:00 pm | 0.83 | 0.2/1 |
| 2 | "Beast Interrupted" | June 9, 2016 | Thursday 9:00 pm | 0.76 | 0.2/1 |
| 3 | "Down for the Count" | June 16, 2016 | Thursday 9:00 pm | 0.79 | 0.2/1 |
| 4 | "Something's Gotta Give" | June 23, 2016 | Thursday 9:00 pm | 0.83 | 0.2/1 |
| 5 | "It's a Wonderful Beast" | June 30, 2016 | Thursday 9:00 pm | 0.76 | 0.2/1 |
| 6 | "Beast of Times, Worst of Times" | July 7, 2016 | Thursday 9:00 pm | 0.77 | 0.2/1 |
| 7 | "Point of No Return" | July 14, 2016 | Thursday 9:00 pm | 0.72 | 0.2/1 |
| 8 | "Love is a Battlefield" | July 21, 2016 | Thursday 9:00 pm | 0.73 | 0.2/1 |
| 9 | "The Getaway" | July 28, 2016 | Thursday 9:00 pm | 0.71 | 0.2/1 |
| 10 | "Means to an End" | August 11, 2016 | Thursday 9:00 pm | 0.61 | 0.2/1 |
| 11 | "Meet the New Beast" | August 25, 2016 | Thursday 9:00 pm | 0.67 | 0.2/1 |
| 12 | "No Way Out" | September 8, 2016 | Thursday 9:00 pm | 0.70 | 0.2/1 |
| 13 | "Au Revoir" | September 15, 2016 | Thursday 9:00 pm | 0.70 | 0.2/1 |
