= Beauty & the Beast season 3 =

Beauty & the Beast
- Season 3
- DVD cover
- No. of episodes: 13

Release
- Original network: The CW
- Original release: June 11 – September 10, 2015

Season chronology
- ← Previous; Season 2 Next → Season 4

The third season of Beauty & the Beast (an American television series developed by Sherri Cooper-Landsman and Jennifer Levin and very loosely inspired by the 1987 CBS television series of the same name) consisted of 13 episodes. It aired in the United States on The CW starting June 11, 2015.

== Plot ==
Following the events of the season two finale, Vincent and Catherine can finally expose their relationship to the world. Vincent and Catherine will be living as a couple, but the challenge this season will be whether they can keep outside forces from tearing them apart. Season three will have a stronger focus on family, with Heather Chandler being a more prominent character and the viewers being introduced to two of Catherine's aunts. The show's costume designer Catherine Ashton announced via Twitter that the third season will reportedly end with some closure and a big cliffhanger.

== Cast ==
=== Main ===
- Kristin Kreuk as Catherine "Cat" Chandler
- Jay Ryan as Vincent Keller
- Austin Basis as J.T. Forbes
- Nina Lisandrello as Tess Vargas
- Nicole Gale Anderson as Heather Chandler

=== Recurring ===
- Jason Gedrick as Liam Cullen
- Brennan Brown as Captain Ward
- Zach Appelman as Alton Finn
- Gloria Votsis as Julianna Keaton
- Ted Whittall as Bob Reynolds
- Arnold Pinnock as Agent Jack Thomas
- Alan van Sprang as Bob Hall
- Natasha Henstridge as Carol Hall
- Wendy Crewson as Helen Ellingsworth
- Pat Mastroianni as Agent Russo
- Khaira Ledeyo as Dr. Vanessa Chandler

== Production ==
On May 8, 2014, Beauty & the Beast was renewed for a third season of 13 episodes. Filming on season three commenced on August 29, 2014, and ended on February 12, 2015. Season three was originally set to premiere on May 21, 2015, but the premiere date was later moved by The CW to June 11, 2015.

=== Casting ===
Nicole Gale Anderson, who has been recurring as Heather Chandler for the past two seasons, was upgraded to series regular for season three. Alan Van Sprang and Natasha Henstridge played recurring characters this season Bob and Carol, married Professional Homeland Security Agents whose relationship mirrors that of Vincent and Catherine's. Charlotte Arnold guest starred in the season premiere as Marissa, a distraught Midwestern woman whose stockbroker husband suddenly begins displaying erratic, violent behavior. Jason Gedrick also appeared this season as Liam, who poses a threat to Catherine and Vincent. Brandon Gill guest starred as Detective Wesley Atchison in the 5th episode of the season when Cat was assigned a new partner.

== Episodes ==
No. overall	No. in season	Title	Directed by	Written by	Original release date	US viewers (millions)
45	1	"The Beast of Wall Street"	Jeff Renfroe	Brad Kern	June 11, 2015	0.88
Catherine and Vincent are finally able to become a real couple following their defeat of Gabe, but this may be short lived after two DHS Agents begin following them.
46	2	"Primal Fear"	David McNally	Roger Grant	June 18, 2015	0.81
Vincent & Catherine are adjusting to moving in together, while they track down a new lead on the superhuman experiments.
47	3	"Bob & Carol & Vincent & Cat"	Stuart Gillard	Melissa Glenn	June 25, 2015	0.86
Cat and Vincent team with married DHS agents on a case; J.T. thinks he may possess super powers; Tess contemplates a career move; and Heather makes a suggestion that could make her big sister's life a little easier.
48	4	"Heart of the Matter"	Rich Newey	Jeff Reno & Ron Osborn	July 2, 2015	0.88
Cat and Vincent see a therapist about their relationship; and Cat investigates a wealthy transplant recipient whom she suspects may be behind the mysterious experiments.
49	5	"The Most Dangerous Beast"	Mairzee Almas	Benjamin Raab & Deric A. Hughes	July 9, 2015	0.86
Cat is assigned to a new partner, and suspects that Bob and Carol are working to separate her from Vincent. In other events, JT learns that his newfound healing ability comes with a high price.
50	6	"Chasing Ghosts"	Jill Carter	Gillian Horvath	July 16, 2015	1.00
Vincent's bachelor party is interrupted by a mysterious sniper trying to stop Vincent and Cat's interference with the super human experiments, while Cat faces her aunts, in town for her bridal shower.
51	7	"Both Sides Now"	Deborah Chow	Vanessa Rojas	July 23, 2015	0.95
Vincent and Cat decide to elope to draw out a superhuman assassin chasing them. J.T. tries to find a lead on the experiments, and Heather tries to focus at her new job.
52	8	"Shotgun Wedding"	Stuart Gillard	Brad Kern & Anthony Epling	July 30, 2015	0.98
Catherine worries about the superhuman experiments ruining her & Vincent's wedding day, prompting everyone to intervene so they will get married.
53	9	"Cat's Out of the Bag"	David MacLeod	Wendy Straker Hauser	August 6, 2015	0.79
When Cat gives up the fight against the greater threat, Vincent, J.T., Tess, and Heather have to convince Cat of her & Vincent's destiny to stop the threats together.
54	10	"Patient X"	Norma Bailey	Benjamin Raab & Deric A. Hughes	August 13, 2015	0.92
Cat & Vincent find someone who could give them answers and help them track down Liam, and J.T. goes to great lengths to make sure he is no longer affected by the serum anymore.
55	11	"Unbreakable"	Sudz Sutherland	Roger Grant & Melissa Glenn	August 20, 2015	0.82
Vincent ends up working with Liam, while Cat researches Liam's family history to find out what his ultimate goal is.
56	12	"Sins of the Fathers"	Jeff Renfroe	Gillian Horvath	August 27, 2015	0.92
Vincent & Cat come up with an unexpected method that could stop Liam; J.T. finds a way to cure himself, but it involves Liam.
57	13	"Destined"	Stuart Gillard	Brad Kern	September 10, 2015	0.76
Cat & Vincent have to stop Liam from exposing Vincent and destroying their love.

== Reception ==
=== U.S. Nielsen ratings ===
No.	Title	Air date	Viewers (in millions)	18–49 Rating/Share
1	"Beast of Wall Street"	June 11, 2015	0.88	0.3/1
2	"Primal Fear"	June 18, 2015	0.81	0.3/1
3	"Bob & Carol & Vincent & Cat"	June 25, 2015	0.86	0.2/1
4	"Heart of the Matter"	July 2, 2015	0.88	0.2/1
5	"The Most Dangerous Beast"	July 9, 2015	0.86	0.2/1
6	"Chasing Ghosts"	July 16, 2015	1.00	0.3/1
7	"Both Sides Now"	July 23, 2015	0.95	0.2/1
8	"Shotgun Wedding"	July 30, 2015	0.98	0.2/1
9	"Cat's Out of the Bag"	August 6, 2015	0.79	0.2/1
10	"Patient X"	August 13, 2015	0.92	0.3/1
11	"Unbreakable"	August 20, 2015	0.82	0.2/1
12	"Sins of the Fathers"	August 27, 2015	0.92	0.2/1
13	"Destined"	September 10, 2015	0.76	0.2/1

== DVD release ==
Release dates			Ep #	Additional information
Region 1	Region 2	Region 4	Ep #	Additional information
May 10, 2016	March 14, 2016	June 2, 2016	13	Features; Deleted Scenes; Season in Review: The Beast Strikes Again – featurette; A Day In The Life Of The Writers' Room – featurette; Gag Reel
