= Zach Appelman =

American actor (born 1985)

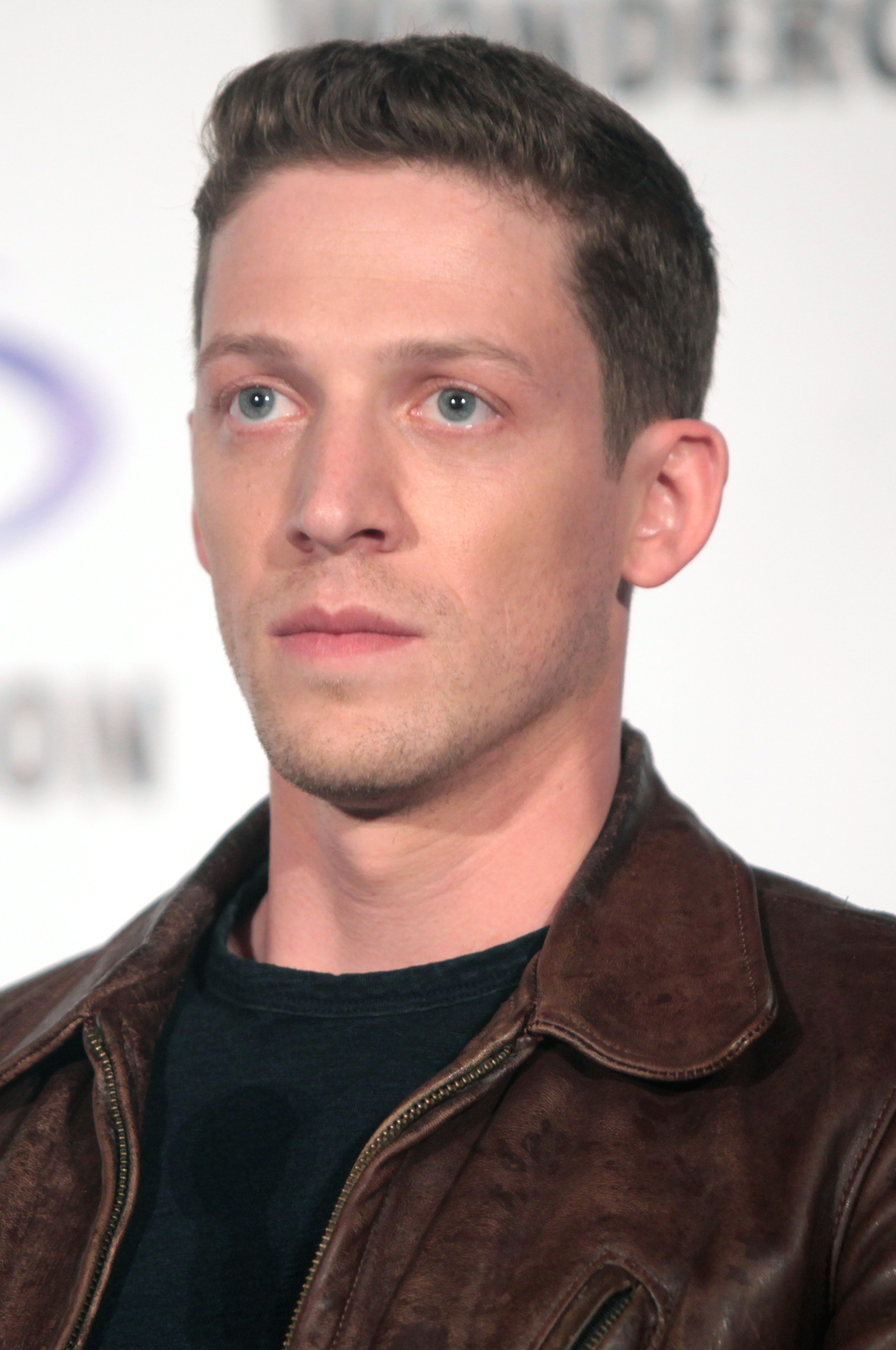
- Appelman in 2016
- Born: August 5, 1985 (age 41); Palo Alto, California U.S.
- Education: University of California, Santa Barbara (BFA); Yale University (MFA)
- Occupation: Actor
- Years active: 2010–present
- Website: zachappelman.com

Zach Appelman (born August 5, 1985) is an American film, television and theatre actor. He is known for portraying Luke Detweiler in the 2013 film Kill Your Darlings, Joe Corbin in the television series Sleepy Hollow, and Alton Finn in the television series Beauty & the Beast.

== Early life ==
Appelman was born and raised in Palo Alto, California, and attended high school there. Appelman played many sports in high school, including track and field, wrestling, and competitive martial arts. Appelman earned a black belt in karate in high school. He went on to attend the University of California, Santa Barbara, where he earned a BFA in acting. Appelman then attended the Yale School of Drama for his MFA in acting.

== Career ==
Appelman's first job out of graduate school was playing Tybalt in Romeo and Juliet. He would then go on to act in regional theatre in such productions as Hamlet, Timon of Athens, King Lear and A Midsummer Night's Dream. Appelman then went on to the New York City theatre district to perform in Theatre for a New Audience's A Midsummer Night's Dream as Demetrius and Broadway's War Horse as Sgt. Fine.

Appelman went on to perform in film and on television. He appeared in 2013's Kill Your Darlings as Luke Detweiler. His first lead role was in 2014's A Midsummer Night's Dream as Demetrius. In season 15 of Law & Order: Special Victims Unit, Appelman guest starred as Officer Jimmy Hamilton in two episodes. He guest starred as Joe Corbin during the second season of the Sleepy Hollow television series. He had a recurring role during season three of Beauty & the Beast as Alton Finn. On August 21, 2015, it was announced that Appelman had been made a series regular on Sleepy Hollow. Appelman was featured in Sheri Wilner's play The Miracle of Chanukah and Patrick Gabridge's play Christmas Breaks for public radio show and podcast. In 2016, Appelman appeared in the film Complete Unknown. In 2017, he portrayed Assistant US Attornery Matt Miller on Chicago P.D.

== Filmography ==
=== Film ===
Year	Title	Role	Notes	ref
2013	Kill Your Darlings	Luke Detweiler	Biographical drama film written by Austin Bunn and directed by John Krokidas	
2014	A Midsummer Night's Dream	Demetrius	Comedy film based on William Shakespeare's play of the same name.	
2016	Complete Unknown	Malcolm	Drama film directed by Joshua Marston.	
2018	Like Father	Steve		

=== Television ===
Year	Title	Role	Notes	ref
2012	Homeland	James Carrington	Episode: "Broken Hearts" (S 2:Ep 10)	
2013–2014	Law & Order: Special Victims Unit	Officer Jimmy Hamilton	Episode: "Surrender Benson" (S 15:Ep 1); Episode: "Psycho/Therapist" (S 15:Ep 10)	
2014	Black Box	Danny Walker	Episode: "Free Will" (S 1:Ep 8)	
2014–2016	Sleepy Hollow	Joe Corbin	Episode: "And the Abyss Gazes Back" (S 2:Ep 6); Main cast; Season 3	
2015	Beauty & the Beast	Alton Finn	Episodes: "Primal Fear" (S 3:Ep 2); "Cat's Out of the Bag" (S 3:Ep 9); "Patient X" (S 3:Ep 10)	
2017–2018	Chicago P.D.	Matt Miller	Recurring Season 5	
2019	The Passage	Agent Phil Doyle	Episode: Pilot (S1: Ep 1)	
2019	The Resident	Hades/Doug Atwater	Episode: Belief System (S3: Ep 4)	
2019–2020	God Friended Me	Lt. Fremont	Recurring Season 2	
2020	New Amsterdam	Sam Singer	Episode: "14 Years, 2 Months, 8 Days" (S2: Ep 12)	
2025	Chicago Med	Jeremy Lockhart	Episode: Double Down (S11: Ep 7)	
2026	The Night Agent	Theo Miller	Recurring Season 3	

=== Theatre ===
Title	Role	Name of Theatre	ref
Hamlet	Hamlet	Hartford Stage	
Arms and the Man	Captain Bluntschli	The Old Globe	
Henry V	Henry V of England	Folger Theatre	
Romeo and Juliet	Tybalt	Chicago Shakespeare Theater	
Death of a Salesman	Biff	Chautauqua Theater Company	
Arcadia	Septimus	Chautauqua Theater Company	
A Midsummer Night's Dream	Francis Flute	Chautauqua Theater Company	
The Winter's Tale	Time	Chautauqua Theater Company	
Tartuffe	Tartuffe	Yale Repertory Theatre	
As You Like It	William	Shakespeare Santa Cruz	
King Lear	Part of ensemble	Shakespeare Santa Cruz	
Timon of Athens	Alcibiades	Theatre Artists Group	
The Comedy of Errors	Dromio of Ephesus	Shakespeare Santa Cruz	
A Midsummer Night's Dream	Demetrius	Theatre for a New Audience	
War Horse	Sgt. Fine	Broadway	
