= Boxboarders! =

- Directed by: Rob Hedden
- Written by: Rob Hedden
- Produced by: Paul Brinkman; George Elder
- Starring: James Immekus; Austin Basis; Michelle Pierce; Mitch Eakins
- Cinematography: Matthew Williams
- Edited by: David L. Bertman
- Music by: Rob Hedden
- Distributed by: Showcase Entertainment
- Release date: April 25, 2007 (Newport Beach Film Festival)
- Country: United States
- Language: English

Boxboarders! is a 2007 independent comedy film written and directed by Rob Hedden and starring James Immekus, Austin Basis, Melora Hardin, and Michelle Pierce.

== Plot ==
Imagine a refrigerator box with a pair of skateboards duct-taped onto it, no brakes and no rules, and you will find the inspiration behind the ground-breaking sport of boxboarding. After a few test runs on their new creation, the underdog duo of James (Basis) and Ty (Immekus) capture the attention of a local TV news crew, this becoming an instant hit at their high school. Seeing the potential for marketing the boxboards, the teens create a high-stakes competition where the winner will secure all rights to what might become the next hula-hoop. Joined by crazy parents, stuck up beach girls, obnoxious brothers, and a group of rich kids trying to steal their idea ... not to mention a Space Vampire and a Lizard Man ... the film captures a race that gives new meaning to the word absurd.

== Cast ==
- James Immekus as Ty Neptune
- Austin Basis as James James
- Michelle Pierce as Tara Rockwell
- Mitch Eakins as Alexander Keene
- Michelle Alexis as Stephanie McCoy
- Stephen Tobolowsky as Dr. Stephen James
- Andy Hedden as Terry "Zazu" Neptune
- Hudson Thames as Rick James
- Melora Hardin as Ruth Keene
- Christopher Cass as William Keene III
- Kitty Swink as Ginger James
- Julie Brown as Anny Neptune
- Jana Kramer as Victoria
- Marieh Delfino as Cambria Rockwell
- Douglas Rowe as Doug McCoy
- Ty Segall as Sheldon
- Josh Duhon as Jason
- Shane Edelman as Security Guard Bob
- Troy MacDonald as Surf Rat #1
- Corey Hedden as Surf Rat #2
- Ezra Buzzington as Zoltar
- Dale Midkiff as Bruce Rockwell
- Erik "Lizard Man" Sprague as Self
