= Townhouse Incident =

- Law & Order: Special Victims Unit episode
- Episode no.: Season 17; Episode 11
- Directed by: Nick Gomez
- Written by: Brianna Yellen
- Original air date: January 13, 2016

Guest appearances
- Andy Karl as Mike Dodds; Robert John Burke as Ed Tucker; Amber Skye Noyes as Roxy Volkov; Joe Reagan as Joe Utley; James McMenamin as Ralph Volkov; Hasaan Gilmer as Pierson Dawes; Wendy Hoopes as Lisa; Bronwyn Reed as Lucy Huston; Cole Bernstein as Tess; Jack Gore as Luca

Episode chronology
← Previous "Catfishing Teacher"	Next → "A Misunderstanding"
- Law & Order: Special Victims Unit season 17

Townhouse Incident is an episode of American crime drama Law & Order: Special Victims Unit. The episode sees Olivia Benson being taken hostage after doing a welfare check on a family and focuses on her ordeal during the situation. Other aspects of the episode include a conclusion to a case featured in earlier episode of the season "Community Policing". The pacing of the episode found praise as did the performance from Hargitay though some reviewers felt this episode wasn’t as good as previous episodes where Benson was held hostage.

== Premise ==
Olivia Benson's childminder Lucy asks her for assistance after being abruptly sent away by another family she works for as she was concerned, Benson agrees to do a welfare check and leaves to do it. Arriving at the family's brownstone, she is taken hostage along with the family already being held hostage by Joe Utley, Roxie and Ralph Volkov. Benson identifies herself as a police officer and they remove her weapons and phone. Joe upon seeing a photo of Noah, threatens her life by using the photo of Noah. He then orders Roxie to tie Benson up.

At the squad room, Fin Tutuola is reading a newspaper when Mike Dodds arrives and makes light conversation until Dominick Carisi, Jr. walks in informing them that a rapist they’ve been pursuing (Note: As seen in the episode Community Policing) has struck again, Dodds says he’ll text Benson on route to the scene. Meanwhile Lisa, the mother quietly briefs Benson about how the hostage situation started while her husband is badly beaten up on the kitchen floor. It’s revealed that Ralph used to work for the husband and was fired and they are there to rob the family she also reveals that her son Luca is tied up upstairs. Joe informs Benson about the text Dodds sent and replied to her text when she informs him she needed to answer it. Lisa informs Joe about a safe deposit box to which he sends her to get it with Ralph.

At the crime scene, Carisi, Tutuola and Dodds take the victim's statement and pursue the rapist on the roof to which they arrest him. Meanwhile, Benson and Lisa's daughter Tess are taken upstairs to Luca where she tries to make sure he is okay but Joe doesn’t let her. He zip ties her to a bed. Joe informs Benson about the rapist being caught and then decides to celebrate by raping Tess in another room while Benson, Luca and Roxy listen. Benson tries to get out to help Tess and Roxy pistol whips her in the face. Benson convinces Roxie to untie her so she can at least soothe Luca who is crying out over hearing Tess's assault. She gives him headphones and a tablet to try and help him not hear the assault. Lucy texts Benson and Roxie demands to know who she is, Benson says she needs to reply to highlight Noah's daycare routine.

At the squad, Tutuola, Dodds and Rafael Barba discuss the rapist caught with his lawyer and then Barba asks where Benson is, the squad believe she’s at a DNA conference and Barba reveals that she wasn’t as he was also there. Lucy comes in and reads them a text that concerns her as Benson raised the alarm by using the name of a man who previously kidnapped her, William Lewis. (Note: As seen in the episodes Her Negotiation and Surrender Benson) Barba tries ringing Benson to no avail.

Joe returns with Tess, and Benson tries to console Tess when a call from Ralph comes as Lisa is demanding proof of life to which Joe sends a photo to Ralph. The doorbell rings where Joe decides that Tess will send whoever is at the door away or he’ll kill Luca. Tutuola and Carisi pose as truancy officers but she sends them away. They call in E.S.U. for a Hostage situation. Joe works out they were police officers and accuses Tess of convincing them they were in trouble. Roxie tries to leave but Joe won’t leave. E.S.U. take up positions in the neighbourhood and lock it down. Roxie gets scared and still wants to leave but Joe demands Benson to get the police away where she calls Dodds where Joe makes demands and then tells Benson to bring whoever would care if she lived or died to the scene in which she requests Ed Tucker from Internal Affairs Bureau to assist in the Hostage negotiation. Tucker arrives and informs that he is a trained hostage negotiator. Tucker rings Benson's phone, Benson give a brief description of what is going on, Tucker asks after Lisa, Joe wants her to lie and say she’s with them but Benson doesn’t lie which alerts the team to a third hostage taker. Joe makes his demands to Tucker, Tucker admits it will take time to meet the demands.

At the bank, Tutuola and Carisi apprehend Ralph with Lisa's protests due to worrying for her children. Barba is brought in to make a potential deal with Ralph. Carisi learns about the photo of the children. They then learn that Joe was dishonourably discharged from the Special Forces. Joe rings Ralph and demands him to bring the cash but Ralph admits that he has been apprehended. Joe is angry and Roxie shows concern for Ralph. Joe verbally abuses Ralph and assaults Roxie in heat of the moment. Joe agrees to trade Richard, the father for the money. Dodds poses as a paramedic to get a view of the situation. Joe demands they take off their stab vests which he places one on himself and one on Roxie. Roxie exits the house to check the car when it arrives but decides to get on the ground and surrender and she is arrested. Joe then leaves the house with Benson, Tess and Luca, the children escape and he briefly uses Benson as a shield until she moves and a police sniper shoots him in the head. Benson cries for Noah where Tucker informs her that they’ll have him brought to her.

== Development ==
When discussing the episode, Anne Easton of Observer mentions that the character featured in the episode Joe Utely was named after Los Angeles Dodgers player Chase Utley by explaining "Joe Utley had to be a villain—with a name like that. Non-sports fans may not get the reference but the character is named after Los Angeles Dodgers player Chase Utley. Last post-season, in the Major League Baseball Divisional series; Utley went into second base high and hard in an attempt to break up a double-play. His wild slide took out New York Mets shortstop Ruben Tejada, breaking Tejada’s leg. Tejada, a key player, was lost for the rest of the play-offs, and possibly longer. Utley was suspended for two games, but many won’t soon forget how his actions compromised the Mets chances of winning baseball’s highest honor, The World Series. SVU EP Warren Leight is a Mets so it’s no surprise that he gave this particular character this moniker."

In an interview, it was reported that showrunner Warren Leight explained "The episode, called “Townhouse Incident,” centers on a home invasion gone bad with Benson stuck right in the middle. “It almost feels like it takes place in real time at gunpoint in the middle of a home invasion so it has a different clock to it… Benson, a little stressed, steps into a hellish nightmare, drops her guard for a nanosecond and there goes, possibly, her life." Leight added how this episode for Benson would be different by the fact she now has a child at home by saying "Is it different to be in this situation when you have a two-year-old at home? One of the things we’re toying with is how do you handle the pressures of this job when you’re a parent? … You react differently when you’re in danger when there’s nobody that you’re responsible for at home."

In an additional interview Mariska Hargitay highlighted Benson's story going forward by saying "Benson knows much more this time about taking care of herself. That can work against her too, in the sense that she might be tempted to say, ‘I’ve been though this already, I got this."

== Reception ==
Anne Easton of the Observer wrote about the episode "Everyone has found themselves, at one time or another, in a situation and thought, ‘Just how in the hell did I end up here?’ It’s worse when the situation seems eerily reminiscent of something that’s happened in the past, and all the more painful if it’s something that was difficult to deal with and/or get over. Such is exactly what happens in this episode of SVU, during which Olivia finds herself, once again, at the wrong end of a gun." Easton also added, "Also a shout out is due to the creative team for pleasingly pacing the movement of the storyline and the visual aspect of this episode. The script was strong to begin with, but a storyline like this like can be tricky as a large percentage of the main action takes place in a static location with lots of conversation (much like an interrogation room heavy piece). The tendency in these instances can be to focus on and constantly cut to whoever is actively speaking. But here, relevant reactions were thoughtfully included, as were needed spaces, meaning, the piece was allowed to breathe. By doing this the audience was uniquely able to process Olivia’s thoughts a bit more. This is how it should work when a lead character is in peril and has to contemplate just how to act and react. This type of pacing is often hard to do in episodic television due to time constraints. It’s a testament to lead Mariska Hargitay that she provided the emotion needed to pull off this type of character study within the narrative, and she did just that extremely well here."

Jack Ori of TVFanatic said this episode didn’t compare to the previous hostage situations Benson has been in by saying "Olivia Benson has been through the wringer. Kidnapped, almost raped, almost accused of assault and murder after she faced down her kidnapper for a second time. And now, in Law & Order: SVU Season 17 Episode 11, held hostage again. The William Lewis saga's power came from Olivia's difficulties dealing with her ordeal after it was over. "Townhouse Incident" wasn't nearly as compelling." He added "The hostage negotiations were tense and frightening, mostly because Joe was so incredibly crazy."

Kate Stanhope of The Hollywood Reporter said about the episode, "Wednesday’s episode was one of the toughest hours of Olivia Benson’s life."

The episode placed at number 3 of a Screen Rant list of "10 Law & Order: SVU Episodes That Will Make You Want to Smash Your TV", Jack Ori, the list compiler said "Benson too often jumps into hostage situations in the later seasons of Law & Order: SVU. "Townhouse Incident" was the worst of these types of episodes."

Chris Harnick writing for E! News wrote about the episode "Attention Emmy votes: Mariska Hargitay is comin' for ya. Law & Order: SVU gave Hargitay, who has already taken home an Emmy for her work as Olivia Benson, a showcase episode with "Townhouse Incident." In the heart-pounding episode, Hargitay's Benson is taken hostage in a townhouse with the family who lives there after she stopped by, doing a good deed for her babysitter, Lucy (Bronwyn Reed)." They also said "Best line of the night: "What are you Mother Teresa? I've already been saved by Joe, OK?""
