= List of Beauty & the Beast (2012 TV series) episodes =

Beauty & the Beast is an American television drama which premiered on October 11, 2012, and concluded on September 15, 2016, on The CW. The series was developed by Sherri Cooper-Landsman and Jennifer Levin, and is very loosely inspired by the 1987 CBS television series of the same name.

A total of 70 episodes of Beauty & the Beast aired over the course of four seasons.

== Series overview ==
Season	Episodes	Originally released	
Season	Episodes	First released	Last released
1	22	October 11, 2012	May 16, 2013
2	22	October 7, 2013	July 7, 2014
3	13	June 11, 2015	September 10, 2015
4	13	June 2, 2016	September 15, 2016

== Episodes ==
=== Season 1 (2012–13) ===
No. overall	No. in season	Title	Directed by	Written by	Original release date	US viewers (millions)
1	1	"Pilot"	Gary Fleder	Sherri Cooper & Jennifer Levin	October 11, 2012	2.78
2	2	"Proceed with Caution"	Rick Bota	Sherri Cooper & Jennifer Levin	October 18, 2012	2.00
3	3	"All In"	P. J. Pesce	Jeff Rake	October 25, 2012	1.88
4	4	"Basic Instinct"	Bradley Walsh	Roger Grant	November 1, 2012	1.70
5	5	"Saturn Returns"	Steven A. Adelson	Story by : Blair Singer; Teleplay by : Blair Singer & Kelly Souders	November 8, 2012	1.84
6	6	"Worth"	Kevin Fair	Allison Moore	November 15, 2012	1.56
7	7	"Out of Control"	Rick Bota	Brian Peterson & Kelly Souders	November 29, 2012	1.52
8	8	"Trapped"	Paul Fox	Emily Silver	December 6, 2012	1.41
9	9	"Bridesmaid Up!"	Mairzee Almas	Sherri Cooper & Jennifer Levin	December 13, 2012	1.59
10	10	"Seeing Red"	Rick Bota	Roger Grant	January 24, 2013	1.79
11	11	"On Thin Ice"	Mike Rohl	Blair Singer	January 31, 2013	1.72
12	12	"Cold Turkey"	Fred Gerber	Allison Moore	February 7, 2013	1.48
13	13	"Trust No One"	Bobby Roth	Brian Peterson & Kelly Souders	February 14, 2013	1.40
14	14	"Tough Love"	Bradley Walsh	Don Whitehead & Holly Henderson	February 21, 2013	1.52
15	15	"Any Means Possible"	Steven A. Adelson	Roger Grant	March 14, 2013	1.43
16	16	"Insatiable"	Lee Rose	Blair Singer	March 21, 2013	1.72
17	17	"Partners in Crime"	Rick Rosenthal	Emily Silver	March 28, 2013	1.50
18	18	"Heart of Darkness"	Scott Peters	Roger Grant & Blair Singer	April 18, 2013	1.59
19	19	"Playing with Fire"	Mike Rohl	Brian Studler	April 25, 2013	1.24
20	20	"Anniversary"	Mairzee Almas	Holly Henderson & Don Whitehead	May 2, 2013	1.23
21	21	"Date Night"	Kevin Fair	Story by : Roger Grant; Teleplay by : Sherri Cooper & Jennifer Levin	May 9, 2013	1.29
22	22	"Never Turn Back"	Rick Bota	Kelly Souders & Brian Peterson	May 16, 2013	1.26

=== Season 2 (2013–14) ===
No. overall	No. in season	Title	Directed by	Written by	Original release date	US viewers (millions)
23	1	"Who Am I?"	Stuart Gillard	Brad Kern	October 7, 2013	0.86
24	2	"Kidnapped"	Rick Bota	Jennifer Levin & Sherri Cooper	October 14, 2013	0.90
25	3	"Liar, Liar"	Bradley Walsh	John A. Norris	October 21, 2013	0.82
26	4	"Hothead"	Michael Robison	Roger Grant	October 28, 2013	0.83
27	5	"Reunion"	Fred Gerber	Eric Tuchman	November 4, 2013	0.68
28	6	"Father Knows Best"	Paul Kaufman	Brad Kern & Roger Grant	November 11, 2013	0.75
29	7	"Guess Who's Coming to Dinner?"	Jeff Renfroe	Wendy Straker Hauser	November 18, 2013	0.68
30	8	"Man or Beast?"	Stuart Gillard	John A. Norris	November 25, 2013	0.74
31	9	"Don't Die on Me"	Mairzee Almas	Eric Tuchman	January 13, 2014	0.71
32	10	"Ancestors"	Steven A. Adelson	Roger Grant & Rupa Magge	January 20, 2014	0.74
33	11	"Held Hostage"	Sudz Sutherland	Pamela Sue Anton	January 27, 2014	0.82
34	12	"Recipe for Disaster"	Allan Kroeker	Brad Kern & Wendy Straker Hauser	February 3, 2014	0.93
35	13	"Till Death"	Stuart Gillard	Story by : Roger Grant; Teleplay by : Sherri Cooper & Jennifer Levin	February 10, 2014	0.74
36	14	"Redemption"	Grant Harvey	John A. Norris	February 17, 2014	0.77
37	15	"Catch Me if You Can"	Norma Bailey	Eric Tuchman	March 3, 2014	0.87
38	16	"About Last Night"	Stuart Gillard	Melissa Glenn	March 10, 2014	0.80
39	17	"Beast is the New Black"	Fred Gerber	Sherri Cooper & Jennifer Levin	June 2, 2014	1.06
40	18	"Cat and Mouse"	Jeff Renfroe	Story by : Amy Van Curen; Teleplay by : Brad Kern	June 9, 2014	0.87
41	19	"Cold Case"	Rich Newey	John A. Norris & Eric Tuchman	June 16, 2014	0.76
42	20	"Ever After"	Steven A. Adelson	Vanessa Rojas	June 23, 2014	0.75
43	21	"Operation Fake Date"	Fred Gerber	Sherri Cooper & Jennifer Levin	June 30, 2014	0.84
44	22	"Déjà Vu"	Stuart Gillard	Brad Kern & Roger Grant	July 7, 2014	0.76

=== Season 3 (2015) ===
No. overall	No. in season	Title	Directed by	Written by	Original release date	US viewers (millions)
45	1	"The Beast of Wall Street"	Jeff Renfroe	Brad Kern	June 11, 2015	0.88
46	2	"Primal Fear"	David McNally	Roger Grant	June 18, 2015	0.81
47	3	"Bob & Carol & Vincent & Cat"	Stuart Gillard	Melissa Glenn	June 25, 2015	0.86
48	4	"Heart of the Matter"	Rich Newey	Jeff Reno & Ron Osborn	July 2, 2015	0.88
49	5	"The Most Dangerous Beast"	Mairzee Almas	Benjamin Raab & Deric A. Hughes	July 9, 2015	0.86
50	6	"Chasing Ghosts"	Jill Carter	Gillian Horvath	July 16, 2015	1.00
51	7	"Both Sides Now"	Deborah Chow	Vanessa Rojas	July 23, 2015	0.95
52	8	"Shotgun Wedding"	Stuart Gillard	Brad Kern & Anthony Epling	July 30, 2015	0.98
53	9	"Cat's Out of the Bag"	David MacLeod	Wendy Straker Hauser	August 6, 2015	0.79
54	10	"Patient X"	Norma Bailey	Benjamin Raab & Deric A. Hughes	August 13, 2015	0.92
55	11	"Unbreakable"	Sudz Sutherland	Roger Grant & Melissa Glenn	August 20, 2015	0.82
56	12	"Sins of the Fathers"	Jeff Renfroe	Gillian Horvath	August 27, 2015	0.92
57	13	"Destined"	Stuart Gillard	Brad Kern	September 10, 2015	0.76

=== Season 4 (2016) ===
No. overall	No. in season	Title	Directed by	Written by	Original release date	US viewers (millions)
58	1	"Monsieur et Madame Bête"	Stuart Gillard	Brad Kern	June 2, 2016	0.83
59	2	"Beast Interrupted"	Rich Newey	Lara Olsen	June 9, 2016	0.76
60	3	"Down for the Count"	Don McCutcheon	Benjamin Raab & Deric A. Hughes	June 16, 2016	0.79
61	4	"Something's Gotta Give"	Steven A. Adelson	John E. Pogue	June 23, 2016	0.83
62	5	"It's a Wonderful Beast"	Stuart Gillard	Melissa Glenn	June 30, 2016	0.76
63	6	"Beast of Times, Worst of Times"	Norma Bailey	Patti Carr	July 7, 2016	0.77
64	7	"Point of No Return"	Jill Carter	Gillian Horvath	July 14, 2016	0.72
65	8	"Love is a Battlefield"	Farhad Mann	Vanessa Rojas	July 21, 2016	0.73
66	9	"The Getaway"	Stuart Gillard	Benjamin Raab & Deric A. Hughes	July 28, 2016	0.71
67	10	"Means to an End"	David MacLeod	Melissa Glenn	August 11, 2016	0.61
68	11	"Meet the New Beast"	David Makin	Patti Carr & Lara Olsen	August 25, 2016	0.67
69	12	"No Way Out"	P.J. Pesce	Austin Badgett & Gillian Horvath	September 8, 2016	0.70
70	13	"Au Revoir"	Stuart Gillard	Story by : Michael Gemballa; Teleplay by : Brad Kern	September 15, 2016	0.70

== Ratings ==
Beauty & the Beast : U.S. viewers per episode (millions)

Season	Episode number																						Average
Season	1	2	3	4	5	6	7	8	9	10	11	12	13	14	15	16	17	18	19	20	21	22	Average
1	2.78	2.00	1.88	1.70	1.84	1.56	1.52	1.41	1.59	1.79	1.72	1.48	1.40	1.52	1.43	1.72	1.50	1.59	1.24	1.23	1.29	1.26	1.61
2	0.86	0.90	0.82	0.83	0.68	0.75	0.68	0.74	0.71	0.74	0.82	0.93	0.74	0.77	0.87	0.80	1.06	0.87	0.76	0.75	0.84	0.76	0.80
3	0.88	0.81	0.86	0.88	0.86	1.00	0.95	0.98	0.79	0.92	0.82	0.92	0.76	–									0.88
4	0.83	0.76	0.79	0.83	0.76	0.77	0.72	0.73	0.71	0.61	0.67	0.70	0.70	–									0.73

Audience measurement performed by Nielsen Media Research
