= Amber Skye Noyes =

American actress and singer

- Born: Amber Skye Noyes
- Occupations: Actress, singer
- Years active: 2013–present
- Children: 1
- Website: amberskyemusic.com

Amber Skye Noyes is an American actress and singer, known for her portrayal of Tori Windsor in The CW series Beauty & the Beast and Celine Fox in the third season of the ABC thriller Quantico.

== Early life and career ==
Originally hailing from Warren Township, New Jersey, Noyes attended Wyoming Seminary for high school, before going on to attend Emerson College and later graduating from New York University. In 2013, she made her acting debut in the online television drama series, One Life to Live. Following on from her first role, Noyes won other roles on a variety of TV shows including Beauty & the Beast, The Blacklist, Blindspot and The Deuce.

On December 6, 2017, Deadline Hollywood reported that Noyes was cast in a recurring role on the third season of the ABC thriller Quantico. She starred as FBI agent, Celine Fox.

== Filmography ==
=== Television ===
Year	Title	Role	Notes
2013	One Life to Live	Michelle	Recurring role
2013–2014	Beauty & the Beast	Tori Windsor	Recurring role
2014	The Blacklist	Pepper	Episode: "The Front (No. 74)"
2016	Law & Order: Special Victims Unit	Roxie Volkov	Episode: "Townhouse Incident"
2017	Blindspot	Kat Jarett	Episode: "Devil Never Even Lived"
2017	The Deuce	Ellen	4 episodes
2018	Quantico	Celine Fox	Recurring, season 3, episodes 2 - 6
2018	FBI	Amber Turner	Episode: "Compromised"
2019	The Village	Alanna	3 episodes
2020	MacGyver	Scarlett	4 episodes
2024	Law & Order: Special Victims Unit	Detective Sloane Parrish	Episode: "Tunnel Blind"
