= Ted Whittall =

Canadian actor

Edward "Ted" Whittall (May 20, 1961) is a Canadian actor who is best known for his roles in Wicker Park (2004), The Bone Collector (1999) and Daydream Nation (2010). He also made appearances in Smallville and Schitt’s Creek.

== Filmography ==
=== Film ===
Year	Title	Role	Notes
1995	Bolt	Tector	Direct-to-video
1996	Hawk's Vengeance	Chambers	Direct-to-video
1997	The Assignment	Norfolk Police Captain	
1998	Out of Control	Chuck	
1999	The Bone Collector	Ortiz's Assistant	
2001	February 15, 1839	Soldat #3 / Deuxième Sentinelle	
2001	Hidden Agenda	Sonny Mathis	
2001	Heist	Customs Officer	
2002	The Book of Eve	Martin Elkins	
2004	Wicker Park	Walter	
2008	45 R.P.M.	Pilot	
2010	Flicka 2	HD Walker	
2010	Charlie St. Cloud	Principal	
2010	Daydream Nation	Mr. Wexler	
2012	Random Acts of Romance	Richard	
2014	The Calling	Ian Mason	
2016	Suicide Squad	Admiral Olsen	
2018	Fahrenheit 451	Major Ron Curtis	

=== Television ===
Year	Title	Role	Notes
1995	Are You Afraid of the Dark?	Forest Ranger	Episode: "The Tale of the Manaha"
1996	L'histoire du samedi	Radio operator	Episode: "Mayday"
1996	Pretty Poison	Lead Cop	Television film
1996, 1998	Psi Factor	Officer Brian Campbell / Scanlon	2 episodes
1997	Dead Silence	Toby Geller	Television film
1997	La Femme Nikita	Loan Officer	Episode: "Recruit"
1998	The Mystery Files of Shelby Woo	Dan Hodges	Episode: "The Baseball Fan Mystery"
1999	Exhibit A: Secrets of Forensic Science	Paddy Mitchell	Episode: "Stopwatch Gang"
2000	The Hunger	Mitch	Episode: "The Falling Man"
2000	D.C.	Ted	Episode: "Blame"
2000	Jackie Bouvier Kennedy Onassis	Charles L. Bartlett	Television film
2001	Spinning Out of Control	Tony Berman	Television film
2001	Varian's War	Harry Bingham	Television film
2001	Kiss My Act	Doctor	Television film
2001	Further Tales of the City	Ned Lockwood	3 episodes
2001	No Ordinary Baby	Dr Stuart Mcelroy	Television film
2001	Dice	Smith	6 episodes
2001	Stolen Miracle	Dr. Blaine	Television film
2001, 2004	Blue Murder	Various	3 episodes
2002	Agent of Influence	Robert Madison	Television film
2002	Street Time	Michael Kendry	Episode: "Respect"
2002, 2004	Mutant X	Sebastian Conway / Carl Ames	2 episodes
2003	Rudy: The Rudy Giuliani Story	Gavin	Television film
2003	DC 9/11: Time of Crisis	Jim Wilkinson	Television film
2004	Soul Food	Detective #2	Episode: "Pagan Poetry"
2004	The Eleventh Hour	Nate O'Neill	Episode: "Rather Be Wrong"
2004	Wonderfalls	Dick Johnson	Episode: "Lovesick Ass"
2005	Falcon Beach	Trevor Bradshaw	Television film
2005	Kevin Hill	Lt. John Gorman	Episode: "Losing Isn't Everything"
2005	Degrassi: The Next Generation	Dr. Andras	2 episodes
2006	Between Truth and Lies	Michael	Television film
2006	The State Within	Gordon Adair	6 episodes
2006–2007	Falcon Beach	Trevor Bradshaw	20 episodes
2007	Tin Man	Ahamo	3 episodes
2007	Intelligence	George Browne	7 episodes
2008	The L Word	Captain Curtis Beech	5 episodes
2008	Robson Arms	Matt	Episode: "Wrong and Wronger"
2008	The Andromeda Strain	President William J. Scott	4 episodes
2008	The Other Woman	Derek Plumley	Television film
2008	Gym Teacher: The Movie	The President	Television film
2008	Mail Order Bride	Aaron Carlyle	Television film
2008	The Guardian	Ryan	Episode: "Fight or Flight"
2008	Flirting with Forty	Dr. Sonnet	Television film
2009	Do You Know Me?	David Carter	Television film
2009	Psych	Dick Cheney	Episode: "He Dead"
2009	Web of Lies	Mike Brobin	Television film
2009–2011	Smallville	Rick Flag / Carter Bowfry	5 episodes
2010	Human Target	ADA Harris	Episode: "Run"
2010	Seven Deadly Sins	Jeff Sellars	Episode #1.1
2010	Concrete Canyons	Hoffman	Television film
2010	Shattered	Judge James Wembley	Episode: "Tears Bring Harry"
2010	Tower Prep	Headmaster	11 episodes
2011	Fairly Legal	Tim Connelly	Episode: "Pilot"
2011	Once Upon a Time	The King / Mitchell Herman	Episode: "The Price of Gold"
2012	The Pregnancy Project	Principal Trevor Greene	Television film
2012	Arctic Air	Corp. Dorosh	Episode: "The Professional"
2012	Big Time Movie	Earl of Sandwich	Television film
2012	The Killing	Don	Episode: "Numb"
2013	CAT. 8	Secretary Brian Lee	2 episodes
2013	Nikita	Will Arnold	Episode: "Black Badge"
2013	Against the Wild	Robert Wade	Television film
2013	Murdoch Mysteries	Clarence MacFarlane	Episode: "Murdoch Ahoy"
2013	Played	Kinch	Episode: "Drugs"
2013–2016	Beauty & the Beast	Agent Bob Reynolds	18 episodes
2014	Sensitive Skin	Robert Ringwald	Episode: "The Tree Sisters"
2015	Remedy	Mr. Leclair	Episode: "Blood & Guts"
2015	Suits	Paul Gilroy	Episode: "Privilege"
2015	Reign	Lord Grenier	Episode: "Fight or Flight"
2016	Good Witch	Doug	Episode: "Risk"
2017	Taken	Mejia's Lawyer	Episode: "Pilot"
2017	The Expanse	Dr. Iturbi	4 episodes
2018	Falling Water	Phillip Whittaker	4 episodes
2018	Ransom	Captain Tremblay	Episode: "Radio Silence"
2018	Frankie Drake Mysteries	Charles Kanaskie	Episode: "Dealer's Choice"
2019	Christmas Wedding Runaway	Bob	Television film
2019–2020	Schitt's Creek	Clint Brewer	2 episodes
2020	October Faction	Coach Simons	2 episodes
2020	Country at Heart	Jeremy 'Jud' Judson	Television film
2020	Private Eyes	Donovan Crane	Episode: "Under Par-essure"
