= Austin Basis =

American actor (born 1976)

- Born: Austin Lee Basis; September 14, 1976 (age 49); Sea Gate, Brooklyn, New York City, New York, United States
- Education: Binghamton University
- Occupation: Actor
- Years active: 2002–present

Austin Lee Basis (born September 14, 1976) is an American actor.

== Early life and education ==
Basis was born in Brooklyn, New York, where he attended Mark Twain Intermediate School 239 and Midwood High School. While majoring in theatre at Binghamton University, he performed in the title roles of "Rosencrantz & Guildenstern are Dead" and "I Hate Hamlet", in addition to several original productions. After graduation, he joined the Actors Studio MFA program, where he received a Master of Fine Arts in Acting. He is Jewish.

== Career ==
As a struggling actor in New York, Basis worked as a bartender, a bouncer, a busboy, a cater-waiter, and a substitute teacher while performing in independent and student films, and Off-Off Broadway plays. He also co-created and performed in an improv & sketch comedy show called "Mmm...Comedy" that ran for seven months.

=== Television ===
Basis's most prominent television role has been on the recent incarnation of Beauty & the Beast, where he played J.T. Forbes.

His television debut was in the Comedy Central film Porn 'n Chicken (2002). In 2004 he was cast in an episode of Law & Order: Criminal Intent (2001). He then landed a role in a Warner Brothers TV pilot for FOX called Spellbound (2004) with Christine Baranski, Barry Bostwick and Dave Annable.

Since then, Basis has appeared on numerous TV shows, including Studio 60 on the Sunset Strip (2006), Supernatural (2005), Life on Mars (2008) and Life Unexpected (2010–2011). His film credits include Dorian Blues (2004), Boxboarders! (2007), American Zombie (2007), My Sassy Girl (2008), and The Other End of the Line (2008).

He has appeared in a number of commercials as well, including spots for Toys 'R' Us, Wendy's, Dr. Pepper, State Farm, and Burger King. He also plays Benjamin Bankes the Pig in the Ad Council's "Feed the Pig" campaign.

== Personal life ==
Basis has type 1 diabetes, and he has worked as an activist to promote awareness.

== Filmography ==
=== Film ===
Year	Title	Role	Notes
2002	Porn 'n Chicken	Interviewed Student	TV movie
2004	Spellbound	Ben Miller	TV movie
2004	Dorian Blues	Spooky	
2004	Skips	Leo	short
2005	Terrormarketers		voice
2005	Hazard	Angry Deli Vigilante	
2005	Building Girl	Duffy	
2007	Anthem	Man with a Portrait	short
2007	American Zombie	Ivan	
2007	Boxboarders!	James James	
2007	Om	Bobby	short
2007	Dead Tone	Crazy Cal	
2007	Life Unkind	The Kid	short
2008	My Sassy Girl	Leo	
2008	The Other End of the Line	Charlie Hendricks	
2009	The Things We Carry	Jake	
2010	Re-Cut	David Stankowitz	
2011	J. Edgar	Bank Teller	
2025	Fireflies in the Dusk	Rockwell	Short film

=== Television ===
Year	Title	Role	Notes
2004	Law & Order: Criminal Intent	Lou-Lou Versini	1 episode
2006	Windfall	ATM Man / Sam	2 episodes
2007	Drake & Josh	Skaggs	1 episode
2007	Studio 60 on the Sunset Strip	Robby	1 episode
2008	Supernatural	Kenny Spruce	Episode: "Ghostfacers"
2008	NCIS	Dallas	1 episode
2008	Life on Mars	Willy Kramer	1 episode
2009	Curb Your Enthusiasm	Waiter	1 episode
2010–2011	Life Unexpected	Math Rogers	26 episodes
2011	Necessary Roughness	Phil	2 episodes
2012	Grey's Anatomy	Devin	1 episode
2012–2016	Beauty & the Beast	J.T. Forbes	70 episodes
2016	How To Get Away With Murder	Toby Solomon	1 episode
2017	Escaping Dad	Gary	Television film; originally titled Amber Alert
2018	Lucifer	Todd Cornwell	1 episode
2018	Magnum P.I.	Robert Fraser	1 episode
2020	Agents of S.H.I.E.L.D.	Russell Feldman	Episode: "The Totally Excellent Adventures of Mack and The D"

=== Web ===
Year	Title	Role	Notes
2010–2011	Ghostfacers	Kenny Spruce	11 episodes
