= Rich Newey =

American television director

- Born: April 23, 1975 (age 50)
- Occupation(s): Director, writer

Rich Newey (born April 23, 1975) is a television director and writer currently residing in Los Angeles.

== Career ==
He started as a music video director for such artists as Three 6 Mafia, Bone Thugs-n-Harmony, Sean Paul, Nate Dogg, Flipsyde, Nappy Roots, and Christina Aguilera among others. In 2007 he directed the TV movie I Tried, which premiered on BET. He also has numerous Television Commercials to his credit for clients such as Midway Games, Procter & Gamble, and Bally Total Fitness. He is currently represented by Velocity Entertainment Partners, Kaplan Stahler Agency and Integral Artists in Canada for film and television. He has directed episodes for CW's Beauty & The Beast and Reign, Freeform's The Fosters and Stitchers as well as NBC's Blindspot and God Friended Me for CBS, among others.

In 2020 he directed and edited the feature film "Killing Eleanor" with his wife Annika Marks, who wrote the script and stars alongside Jenny O'Hara, Jane Kaczmarek and Betsy Brandt. Newey and Marks produced along with Angie Gaffney and Richard Kahan and it was executive produced by the Chicago Media Angels. The film premiered at the Savannah Film Festival, where it won Best Narrative Feature.

== Personal life ==
He's married to actress Annika Marks.
