= Nina Lisandrello =

American actress

- Born: Nina Lisandrello; 1 July 1980 (age 46); Encino, Los Angeles, California, USA
- Education: NYU Tisch School of the Arts
- Occupation: Actress
- Years active: 2006–present

Nina Lisandrello is an American actress, known for her role as Tess Vargas in the television series Beauty & The Beast. She has guest starred in Law & Order, Conviction, Nurse Jackie, and FBI.

== Early life ==
Lisandrello was born in Encino, a district of Los Angeles, California. At the age of 10 years she did a TV commercial for Levi's directed by David Fincher. This commercial is what later helped her to become a SAG Foundation member.

Lisandrello's mother is the singer and songwriter Helena Springs.

== Career ==
She first appeared on TV screens playing Serena Mallory in the short lived TV series Conviction. She went on to guest star in some other TV shows such as Law & Order, Mercy, Nurse Jackie, and a made-for-TV movie called Washingtonienne. Parallel to her work in television she has also been seen in some films: in the indie Pre, in the comedy The Best and the Brightest, and in the horror movie The Bleeding House.

Her big break came when she was cast as Tess Vargas in The CW's remake of Beauty & the Beast. Even though the series has received "generally unfavorable" reviews, Lisandrello is so far the only star in the show to receive positive feedback from a TV critic. Mary McNamara of Los Angeles Times said "the only point of light is provided by Catherine's partner, Tess, who, as played with great common-sense appeal by Nina Lisandrello, clearly deserves to be on a better show." On January 21, 2013, in Brazil, she won Best Supporting Actress in a Best of 2012 Awards promoted by Brazilian cable channel Universal Channel.

== Filmography ==
Film
Year	Title	Role	Notes
2006	The Devil Wears Prada	Clacker	(uncredited)
2007	We Own the Night	Bobby's Friend	(uncredited)
2009	Pre	Director	
2010	The Best and the Brightest	Bianca	
2011	The Bleeding House	Lynne	
2021	The Spine of Night	Sparrowcrow	voice

Television
Year	Title	Role	Notes
2006	Conviction	Serena Mallory	2 episodes; "180.80" (season 1: episode 12) "Hostage" (season 1: episode 13)
2009	Washingtonienne	Juliet	TV movie
2009	Law & Order	Belinda Alvarez	"Reality Bites" (season 20: episode 4)
2010	Mercy	Charmaine - Masseuse	"I Saw This Pig and I Thought of You"; (season 1: episode 10)
2010	Nurse Jackie	Jenny	"Bleeding" (season 2: episode 6)
2012-2016	Beauty & the Beast	Tess Vargas	Main role
2018–Present	FBI	Eva Nettles	Recurring Role
2017	NCIS: New Orleans	Dr. Amy Christo	"Sins of the Father" (season 4: episode 8)
