= Beauty & the Beast (2012 TV series) =

2012 science fiction police procedural television series

- Also known as: Beauty and the Beast
- Genre: Police procedural; Science fiction; Suspense
- Based on: Beauty and the Beast by Ron Koslow
- Developed by: Sherri Cooper-Landsman; Jennifer Levin
- Starring: Kristin Kreuk; Jay Ryan; Max Brown; Austin Basis; Nina Lisandrello; Sendhil Ramamurthy; Brian J. White; Nicole Gale Anderson; Amber Skye Noyes; Michael Roark
- Theme music composer: Mark Isham
- Composers: Jim Guttridge; Sean Hosein; Claude Foisy
- Countries of origin: United States; Canada
- Original language: English
- No. of seasons: 4
- No. of episodes: 70 (list of episodes)

Production
- Executive producers: Brian Peterson; Kelly Souders; Gary Fleder; Sherri Cooper-Landsman; Jennifer Levin; Bill Haber; Ron Koslow; Paul Junger Witt; Tony Thomas; Frank Siracusa; John Weber; C. Anthony Thomas; Brad Kern
- Producers: Michael Maschio; Thom Pretak; Roger Grant; Kevin Lafferty; Mairzee Almas
- Production locations: Toronto, Ontario, Canada; New York City, NY
- Cinematography: D. Gregor Hagey; David A. Makin; David Greene; Bruce Chun; Theo van de Sande
- Editors: Padraic McKinley; Jim Towne; Juan Garcia; Monty DeGraff; Terrell Clegg; Robert Ivison; Sunny Hodge; John Peter Bernardo; Fred Peterson; Stan Salfas; Aaron Rottinghaus
- Running time: 40–42 minutes
- Production companies: Whizbang Films; Take 5 Productions; CBS Television Studios

Original release
- Network: The CW
- Release: October 11, 2012 – September 15, 2016

Related
- Beauty and the Beast (1987–1990)

Beauty & the Beast is a science fiction police procedural television series filmed in Toronto, Canada, very loosely inspired by the 1987 CBS series of the same name. Developed by Sherri Cooper-Landsman and Jennifer Levin, the show premiered on The CW on October 11, 2012, and ended its four season-run on September 15, 2016. Kristin Kreuk and Jay Ryan star in the title roles alongside Austin Basis, Nina Lisandrello, Nicole Gale Anderson, Sendhil Ramamurthy, Max Brown, Brian J. White, Amber Skye Noyes, and Michael Roark.

== Plot ==
Catherine Chandler witnessed her mother's murder and was almost killed herself until someone—or something—saved her. After nine years, now working as a detective for the NYPD, a case leads her to Vincent Keller, an ex-soldier believed to have been killed in action during military service, who is actually alive. As Catherine comes to know him, she finds out more about her mother's murder and about who—and what—Vincent really is.

== Cast and characters ==
- Kristin Kreuk as Catherine Chandler
- Jay Ryan as Vincent Keller
- Austin Basis as J.T. Forbes
- Nina Lisandrello as Tess Vargas
- Brian White as Joe Bishop (season 1)
- Max Brown as Evan Marks (season 1; guest, season 4)
- Sendhil Ramamurthy as Gabriel Lowen (seasons 1–2)
- Amber Skye Noyes as Tori Windsor (season 2)
- Nicole Gale Anderson as Heather Chandler (seasons 3–4; recurring, seasons 1–2)
- Michael Roark as Kyle Johnson (season 4)

== Development ==
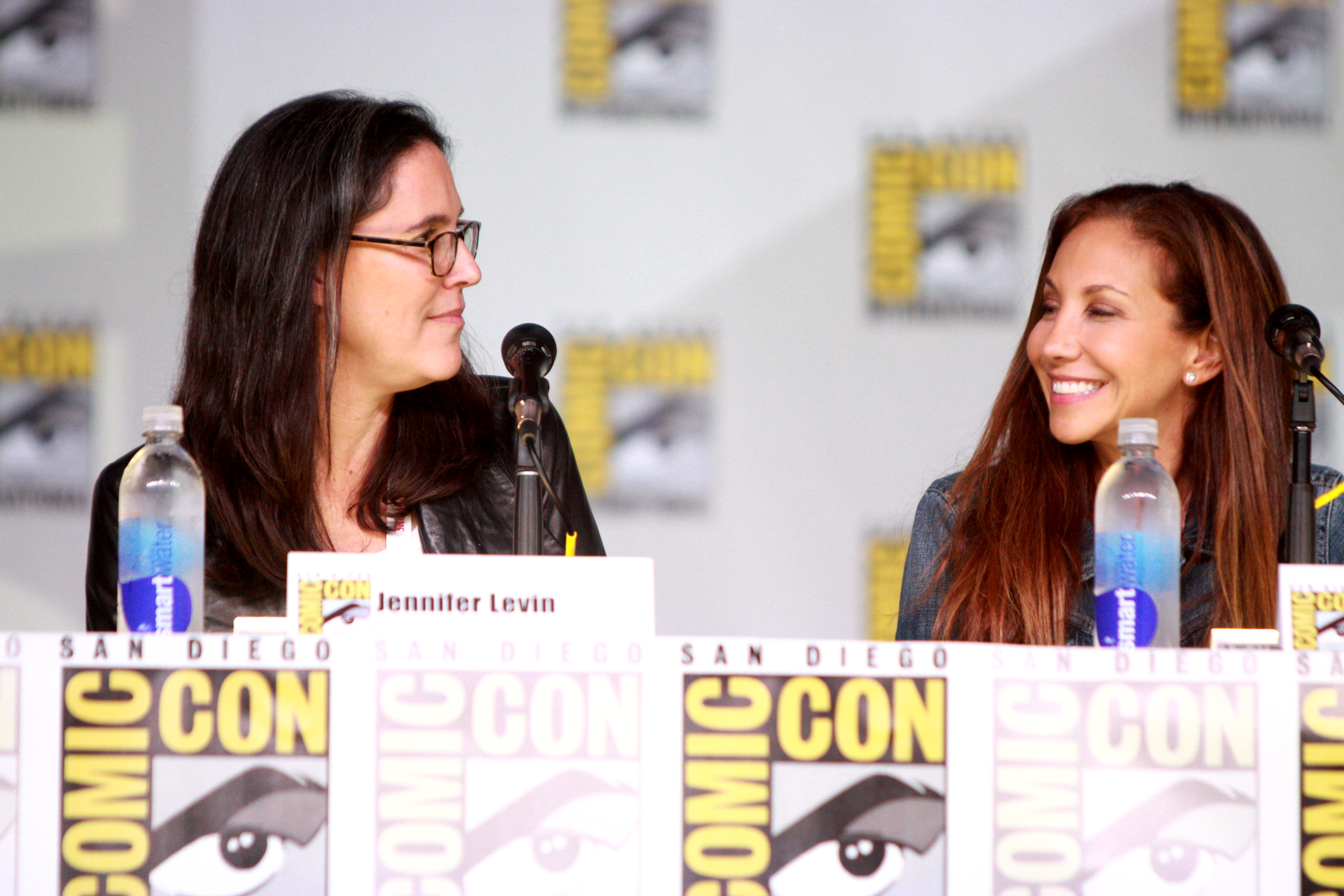
Jennifer Levin and Sherri Cooper-Landsman promoting the show at Comic-Con

"What's beauty and what's beast? There are both of those things in all of us."

— Sherri Cooper-Landsman, executive producer

=== Conception ===
The CW officially began developing the series in September 2011. The project was described as "a modern-day romantic love story with a procedural twist," unlike the original series which was a romantic drama with mystery and suspense elements. The show is the first project that Mark Pedowitz developed when he joined the network.

=== Production ===
The network ordered a pilot of the series in January 2012. The pilot of the show was filmed in Toronto, Canada from March 22 to April 2, 2012. It was picked up by The CW on May 11, 2012, and was scheduled to premiere during the 2012–13 television season. Filming of the first season continued in Toronto from July 27 and production on the thirteenth episode was completed on December 21, 2012. On November 9, 2012, a full season was ordered. On April 26, 2013, Beauty & the Beast was renewed for a second season. Filming of Beauty & the Beast was split between New York City, NY and Toronto from the second season. On May 8, 2014, Beauty & the Beast was renewed for a third season. Filming on season three commenced on August 29, 2014, and ended on February 12, 2015. On February 13, 2015, The CW renewed the series for a fourth season, before the third season began airing. On October 13, 2015, it was announced that the upcoming fourth season would be its last. Filming of the fourth and final season began on May 29, 2015 and ended on November 17, 2015. The final season premiered on June 2, 2016, before concluding on September 15, 2016.

=== Casting ===
Casting announcements began in February 2012, when Kristin Kreuk was first cast in the lead role of Catherine Chandler. Austin Basis was then cast in the role of J.T. Forbes, Vincent's best friend. Nina Lisandrello and Nicole Gale Anderson were then added to the cast, with Lisandrello landing the role of Tess Vargas, Catherine's partner and best friend. Anderson signed on to the recurring role of Heather Chandler, Catherine's younger sister. Jay Ryan joined the series in the second lead role, Vincent Keller (the character was originally called Vincent Koslow, though in the original series, Vincent had no last name). Max Brown signed on for the role of Dr. Evan Marks, a medical examiner who has feelings for Catherine. Brian White was the last actor to sign onto the series. White joined in the role of Joe Bishop, Catherine and Tess' commanding officer at the NYPD, who becomes romantically involved with Tess. White's character of Joe Bishop was not included in the second season of the series; the story line was that Bishop lost his job because he focused too much attention on finding the killer of his brother instead of performing his duties.

== Episodes ==
Season	Episodes	Originally released	
Season	Episodes	First released	Last released
1	22	October 11, 2012	May 16, 2013
2	22	October 7, 2013	July 7, 2014
3	13	June 11, 2015	September 10, 2015
4	13	June 2, 2016	September 15, 2016

== Reception ==
Beauty & the Beast has received mixed reviews from critics. The review aggregator website Rotten Tomatoes reported a 19% and 83% critics' approval ratings for seasons one and two respectively, and overall ratings of 51% and 76% from critics and audiences respectively. The website's consensus limited to the first season reads, "A thoroughly middling romantic fantasy series, Beauty and the Beast suffers from a silly premise, mediocre writing, and bland characterization." The series has a 34 out of 100 weighted average score on Metacritic, indicating "generally unfavorable" reviews from 20 critics. Kyle Anderson of Entertainment Weekly gave the pilot of Beauty & the Beast a C− grade, stating that it lacks the same charm that the 1980s drama had, and that 'The Beast' is more of a Hulk rather than an actual beast. David Wiegand of the San Francisco Chronicle called the series an "overheated, badly written, wretchedly acted and unconvincing drama, which makes mincemeat out of the traditional beauty and the beast fairy tale." Mary McNamara of the Los Angeles Times also made similar observations but praised Nina Lisandrello who still remains as the only cast member in the show to ever receive a positive review. About Lisandrello, McNamara wrote "the only point of light is provided by Catherine's partner, Tess, who, as played with great common-sense appeal by Nina Lisandrello, clearly deserves to be on a better show." More mixed but slightly favorable reviews were provided by David Hinckley of the New York Daily News, who said the series was "such a natural it's downright devilish" and Neil Genzlinger of The New York Times, who stated the "girl-power themes will probably play well to the network's core audience."

=== Ratings ===
Season	Timeslot (ET)	No. of episodes	Premiered		Ended		TV season	Rank	Viewers (in millions)
Season	Timeslot (ET)	No. of episodes	Date	Premiere viewers (in millions)	Date	Finale viewers (in millions)	TV season	Rank	Viewers (in millions)
1	Thursday 9 p.m.	22	October 11, 2012	2.78	May 16, 2013	1.26	2012–2013	#138	1.78
2	Monday 9 p.m.	22	October 7, 2013	0.86	July 7, 2014	0.76	2013–2014	#171	1.24
3	Thursday 8 p.m.	13	June 11, 2015	0.88	September 10, 2015	0.76	2014–2015	N/A	N/A
4	Thursday 9 p.m.	13	June 2, 2016	0.83	September 15, 2016	0.70	2015–2016	N/A	N/A

== Awards and nominations ==
The show has been honored with acknowledgements from the People's Choice Awards, Teen Choice Awards and Saturn Awards as well as the Leo Awards, Canadian Screen Awards, the American Society of Cinematographers, the Canadian Society of Cinematographers and the Directors Guild of Canada.

Accolades for Beauty & the Beast
Year	Result	Award	Category	Recipients
2012	Nominated	E! Golden Remote Award	New Fall Show You're Most Excited For	Beauty & the Beast
2013	Won	People's Choice Award	Favorite New TV Drama	Beauty & the Beast
2013	Nominated	Teen Choice Award	Choice TV Show: Fantasy/Sci-Fi	Beauty & the Beast
2013	Nominated	Teen Choice Award	Choice TV Actress: Fantasy/Sci-Fi	Kristin Kreuk
2013	Nominated	Saturn Award	Best Youth-Oriented Series on Television	Beauty & the Beast
2014	Won	People's Choice Award	Favorite Sci-Fi/Fantasy TV Show	Beauty & the Beast
2014	Won	People's Choice Award	Favorite Sci-Fi/Fantasy TV Actress	Kristin Kreuk
2014	Nominated	ASC Award	Outstanding Achievement in Cinematography in One-Hour Episodic Television Series	David Greene ("Tough Love")
2014	Nominated	Leo Award	Best Direction in a Dramatic Series	Steven A. Adelson ("Any Means Possible")
2014	Nominated	Teen Choice Award	Choice TV Actress: Sci-Fi/Fantasy	Kristin Kreuk
2014	Nominated	DGC Craft Award	Direction - Television Series	Rick Roseenthal ("Partners in Crime")
2015	Won	People's Choice Award	Favorite Network Sci-Fi/Fantasy TV Show	Beauty & the Beast
2015	Won	People's Choice Award	Favorite Sci-Fi/Fantasy TV Actress	Kristin Kreuk
2015	Nominated	CSC Award	Best Cinematography in a TV Series	David A. Makin
2015	Nominated	Canadian Screen Award	Best Production Design or Art Direction in a Fiction Program or Series	Cheryl Dorsey, Peter Emmink, Doug McCullough ("Déjà Vu")
2015	Nominated	DGC Craft Award	Production Design - TV Series	Doug McCullough ("Déjà Vu")
2016	Won	People's Choice Award	Favorite Sci-Fi/Fantasy TV Show	Beauty & the Beast
2016	Nominated	Canadian Screen Award	Best Visual Effects	Robert Vandenhoek
2016	Nominated	Canadian Screen Award	Achievement in Visual Effects	Jeff Skochko
2017	Nominated	Canadian Society of Cinematographers Award	TV series Cinematography	David A. Makin ("Monsieur et Madame Bête")

== Broadcast ==
TVGN aired the first four episodes of the second season of the show back to back from May 11, 2014. This was the first syndication style broadcast of the show in the United States. The first four seasons have also been released to stream on Netflix in some regions and made available to purchase on iTunes. In 2019 Start TV began airing the show in the 5 a.m. ET/PT slot.

== Tie-ins ==
=== Novels ===
A series of tie-in novels, written by Nancy Holder, have been published through Titan Books.

Book	Title	Release date
1	Vendetta	November 25, 2014
2	Some Gave All	March 31, 2015
3	Fire at Sea	May 31, 2016

== DVD releases ==
Name	Release dates			Ep #	Additional information
Name	Region 1	Region 2	Region 4	Ep #	Additional information
The First Season	October 1, 2013	March 10, 2014	April 23, 2014	22	Features; Deleted Scenes; Gag Reel; Season in Review: The Beginning; Dressing the Beauty; Creating the Beast; Commentary on "Pilot"
The Second Season	May 19, 2015	March 9, 2015	December 3, 2015	22	Features; Deleted Scenes; Gag Reel; Season in Review: The Beast is Back; From Script to Screen: Creating an Episode; Set Tour: The Gentleman's Club
The Third Season	May 10, 2016	March 14, 2016	June 2, 2016	13	Features; Deleted Scenes; Gag Reel; Season In Review: The Beast Strikes Again; A Day In The Life Of The Writers' Room
The Fourth Season	December 6, 2016	March 13, 2017	May 7, 2017	13	Features; Deleted Scenes; Gag Reel; Season In Review: Farewell to the Beast; Closing a Chapter – A Fond Farewell
The Complete Series	May 30, 2017			70	Features; Deleted Scenes; Gag Reel
