= Second Coming (Ash vs Evil Dead) =

- Ash vs Evil Dead episode
- Episode no.: Season 2 Episode 10
- Directed by: Rick Jacobson
- Written by: Luke Kalteux
- Cinematography by: Bryan Shaw
- Original release date: December 11, 2016
- Running time: 32 minutes

Guest appearances
- Lee Majors as Brock Williams; Ellen Sandweiss as Cheryl Williams; Ted Raimi as Chet; Joel Tobeck as Baal; Nicholas Hope as Professor Raymond Knowby; Sara West as Tanya; Vin Dizair as Mayor

Episode chronology
← Previous "Home Again"	Next → "Family"

"Second Coming" is the tenth episode and second season finale of the American comedy horror television series Ash vs Evil Dead, which serves as a continuation of the Evil Dead trilogy. It is the twentieth overall episode of the series and was written by co-producer Luke Kalteux, and directed by co-executive producer Rick Jacobson. It originally aired on the premium channel Starz on December 11, 2016.

The series is set 30 years after the events of the Evil Dead trilogy, and follows Ash Williams, who now works at the "Value Stop" as a simple stock boy. Having spent his life not doing anything remarkable since the events of the trilogy, Ash will have to renounce his routine existence and become a hero once more by taking up arms and facing the titular Evil Dead. In the episode, Ash and Kelly try to escape from the cabin as the Deadite forces try to seize the Necronomicon.

According to Nielsen Media Research, the episode was seen by an estimated 0.269 million household viewers and gained a 0.14 ratings share among adults aged 18–49. The episode received mixed-to-positive reviews from critics, who praised the action sequences, humor and character development, but criticizing the episode's logic and writing.

== Plot ==
Professor Knowby (Nicholas Hope) tries to flee in his car with the Necronomicon and his dagger, only to be killed by an unknown force. Back in the cellar, Tanya (Sara West) is murdered by Henrietta, who proceeds to attack Ash (Bruce Campbell). Ash eventually overpowers Henrietta and beheads her with a chainsaw.

Ruby (Lucy Lawless) and Kelly (Dana DeLorenzo) arrive at the cabin, discovering Knowby's killer: Ruby of 1982, who now holds the Necronomicon. Present Ruby tries to reason with her past self, who responds by mortally wounding her. Momentarily wounding her, Ruby gets Ash and Kelly to escape with the book while she holds off past Ruby until she is killed. As they flee back to the Delta, Ash notices that his hand grew back, realizing that they changed history. They also see that Pablo (Ray Santiago) has returned back to life, and flee from past Ruby. However, Pablo reveals itself to be Baal (Joel Tobeck) in disguise, while past Ruby catches up with them and knocks them unconscious.

Awakening at the cabin, Ash and Kelly see Ruby and Baal birthing more of their children. He reveals that he manipulated Ash into going back to this location, which is not the direct past, but an alternate timeline where only Knowby found the book. Ash challenges Baal to a fight without weapons nor magic to make it fair. If Ash wins, Pablo is resurrected and Ruby and Baal return to Hell; if Baal wins, they will unleash the Apocalypse on Earth. Baal accepts and they form a blood bond to officially seal the deal. As they fight, Ruby laments that they are used as bargaining chips and prepares to alter the deal, unsuccessfully trying to get Kelly to join her. During the fight, Baal changes into Chet (Ted Raimi), Cheryl (Ellen Sandweiss), and Brock (Lee Majors) to manipulate him, chopping up his hand again.

However, Ash distracts Baal and stabs him with his own fingernail, removing his skin and causing the spawn to panic and the cabin to start burning. As part of their deal, the ground crumbles, causing the Necronomicon to fall into the Hell and consuming the spawns, Baal and Ruby. Ash and Kelly escape from the cabin just as it collapses. A resurrected Pablo emerges from the ashes, and is reunited with Ash and Kelly. They return to the present of their real timeline, where Ash is revered by Elk Grove as a hero and he now dates Linda (Michelle Hurd). As he gives a speech, the past Ruby is seen in the crowd, having survived. In a post-credits scene, a girl discovers the Necronomicon in the woods and picks it up.

== Production ==
=== Development ===
The episode was written by co-producer Luke Kalteux, and directed by co-executive producer Rick Jacobson. It was Kalteux's first writing credit, and Jacobson's fourth directorial credit.

=== Writing ===
The original idea for the episode was different from the final version, according to executive producer Craig DiGregorio. In the original version, Ash would kill Henrietta and retrieve the Necronomicon, just as his younger version arrives at the cabin, preventing the events from happening and bringing Pablo back to life. As Ruby and Kelly head to the woods to destroy the book, Ash and Pablo would visit Brock Williams and discover what was his "secret" mentioned at the end of the season's third episode. The past Ruby would kill the present Ruby and chase Kelly, who fled with the book. Ash would go to a bar and have sex with a woman, who would turn out to be Kelly's mother. This event causes the Necronomicon to acknowledge Kelly as Ash's daughter. The trio would jump back to the present, where Kelly is abducted by Ruby, Baal and their spawns, with the third season intending to follow Ash rescuing her. DiGregorio constantly fought with executive producer Rob Tapert over creative differences, causing him to step down as showrunner and the finale to be re-written.

== Reception ==
=== Viewers ===
In its original American broadcast, "Second Coming" was seen by an estimated 0.269 million household viewers and gained a 0.14 ratings share among adults aged 18–49, according to Nielsen Media Research. This means that 0.14 percent of all households with televisions watched the episode. This was a slight increase in viewership from the previous episode, which was watched by 0.266 million viewers with a 0.14 in the 18-49 demographics.

=== Critical reviews ===
"Second Coming" received mixed-to-positive reviews from critics. Matt Fowler of IGN gave the episode a "great" 8.5 out of 10 rating and wrote in his verdict, "'Second Coming' was filled with violence and gore galore, wrapping things up in a triumphant Army of Darkness-type way. Kelly's seasonal journey didn't quite stick the landing, and it'll be a "wait and see" deal with regards to evil Ruby returning to the fold, but in the end this was a solid way to seal up Season 2."

Michael Roffman of The A.V. Club gave the episode a "C–" grade and wrote, "Sadly, 'Second Coming' recklessly plows through that magic, splattering everything with jarring, discombobulated results. Without pause, strands of narrative logic are tossed aside for frustrating action, rickety dialogue, and speculative motives. Granted, this franchise has always been fueled by a warped fusion of breakneck pacing and unforgiving gore, but there's always been a structured finesse to the chaos. 'Second Coming' is like watching a sugar-rattled six-year-old playing with his sticky action figures, or even worse, a stack of questionable fan fiction that's about as smooth as Gene Parmesan."

Stephen Harber of Den of Geek wrote, "'Second Coming' follows some very sloppy logic for a season finale, but it's a fitting denouement for an oddly paced year. All of the events the past nine episodes have bombarded us with gel together here, even if there is not much explanation for why certain big wishes are granted." Steve Ford of TV Fanatic gave the episode a 4.8 star rating out of 5 and wrote, "Now that is how you do a season finale!" Merrill Barr of Forbes wrote, "Last year, Ash was very much a show with singular vision and drive, built on the backbone of a single character. This year, as all great shows do, that vision was expanded. Ash wasn't the star of the show. He was just a major player. Kelly and Pablo and even Ruby were equally as important to the success of the story. The further we got in the fight against Baal, the more interesting everyone became."
