= Trapped Inside =

- Ash vs Evil Dead episode
- Episode no.: Season 2 Episode 6
- Directed by: Mark Beesley
- Written by: James E. Eagan
- Cinematography by: Dave Garbett
- Editing by: Tom Eagles
- Original release date: November 6, 2016
- Running time: 28 minutes

Guest appearances
- Ellen Sandweiss as Cheryl Williams; Joel Tobeck as Baal; Stephen Lovatt as Sheriff Thomas Emery

Episode chronology
← Previous "Confinement"	Next → "Delusion"

"Trapped Inside" is the sixth episode of the second season of the American comedy horror television series Ash vs Evil Dead, which serves as a continuation of the Evil Dead trilogy. It is the sixteenth overall episode of the series and was written by co-producer James E. Eagan, and directed by Mark Beesley. It originally aired on the premium channel Starz on November 6, 2016.

The series is set 30 years after the events of the Evil Dead trilogy, and follows Ash Williams, who now works at the "Value Stop" as a simple stock boy. Having spent his life not doing anything remarkable since the events of the trilogy, Ash will have to renounce his routine existence and become a hero once more by taking up arms and facing the titular Evil Dead. In the episode, the group take Pablo to Ash's house to perform a ritual, just as angry townspeople surround the house.

According to Nielsen Media Research, the episode was seen by an estimated 0.330 million household viewers and gained a 0.15 ratings share among adults aged 18–49. The episode received extremely positive reviews from critics, who praised the action sequences, character development and Cheryl's return.

== Plot ==
Ash (Bruce Campbell), Kelly (Dana DeLorenzo), Ruby (Lucy Lawless), Linda (Michelle Hurd) and Lacey (Pepi Sonuga) take Pablo (Ray Santiago) back to Ash's house, where Pablo suffers a seizure. At the police station, Sheriff Emery (Stephen Lovatt) is confronted by citizens for releasing Ash, and is taunted by Baal (Joel Tobeck).

Ruby explains to Pablo that the Necronomicon is manifesting itself through Pablo, with the spell required to cast Baal back to Hell eventually making its way to Pablo's skin. Ruby suggests performing a ritual to stop the book from manifesting any further. The house is then surrounded by angry citizens led by Emery, who was manipulated by Baal. Ash settles into protecting the house while Ruby performs the ritual. Ash hears noises from his late sister Cheryl's bedroom and checks in. He finds Chet (Ted Raimi), who broke in to warn him about the mob.

As Ruby awaits for the spell, a Deadite force enters the house. Cheryl (Ellen Sandweiss) emerges from her room, who is confused about her status. Cheryl reveals herself to be a Deadite and attacks Ash and Chet as she taunts them through the house. Back in the room, the spell eventually leaves Pablo's skin. Ruby starts bleeding, revealing to Kelly that her children took away her immortality. Ash eventually finds Cheryl, who has taken Chet hostage. She shocks Ash by killing Chet before escaping outside. The civilians are surprised to see an alive Cheryl before she turns into a Deadite. She kills a civilian, and Ash shoots her before beheading her. The townspeople applaud Ash, now convinced of his innocence. However, a disguised Baal knocks Ash unconscious.

== Production ==
=== Development ===
The episode was written by co-producer James E. Eagan, and directed by Mark Beesley. It was Eagan's second writing credit, and Beesley's first directorial credit.

== Reception ==
=== Viewers ===
In its original American broadcast, "Trapped Inside" was seen by an estimated 0.330 million household viewers and gained a 0.15 ratings share among adults aged 18–49, according to Nielsen Media Research. This means that 0.15 percent of all households with televisions watched the episode. This was a 20% increase in viewership from the previous episode, which was watched by 0.274 million viewers with a 0.13 in the 18-49 demographics.

=== Critical reviews ===
"Trapped Inside" received extremely positive reviews from critics. Matt Fowler of IGN gave the episode a "great" 8.2 out of 10 rating and wrote in his verdict, "Ash and his Ghostbeaters may have been stuck inside his house for most of this episode, but that doesn't mean there wasn't a ton of carnage and some decent plot movement. Ruby admitted to being mortal while a thrashed and punished Pablo conjured up a special spell to defeat Baal. Meanwhile, Ash was forced to face down his long-dead sister. He may have lost Chet in the process, but re-killing her allowed him to shine in front of his neighbors. 'Trapped Inside' made great use of Ash's past, the ensemble, and the siege element."

Michael Roffman of The A.V. Club gave the episode an "A" grade and wrote, "Talk about a comeback episode: After last week's disappointing 'Confinement', veteran scribe James E. Eagan, who penned last season's challenging 'Brujo', swings back in with arguably the strongest chapter of the series."

Stephen Harber of Den of Geek gave the episode a 4.5 star rating out of 5 and wrote, "'Trapped Inside' has a lot going on for it. It brings half a season's worth of built-up tension between the townsfolk of Elk Grove and Ashy Slashy to a head and then an abrupt close – for the moment, at least." Steve Ford of TV Fanatic gave the episode a 4 star rating out of 5 and wrote, "I am not a fan of the decision to kill off Chet, as I felt he added something special to the show, and was also caught off guard slightly by the darker tone of the episode. Regardless, it was still another fun 30 minutes of Ash and friends."

Merrill Barr of Forbes wrote, "Once again, Ash vs Evil Dead has completely flipped the script on the show's mythology. Now, after spending the first half of the season with Ash against the town, the back-half is going to see the town on his side. What's even cooler, though, is the way it happened by giving emotional weight to one of the most overlooked moments of the Evil Dead franchise." Jasef Wisener of TV Overmind wrote, "Once again, Ash vs. Evil Dead has delivered an incredibly strong episode. This series often makes use of the nostalgia factor (without relying on it), and 'Trapped Inside' is the perfect example of when that nostalgia works."
