= The Mettle of Man =

- Ash vs Evil Dead episode
- Episode no.: Season 3 Episode 10
- Directed by: Rick Jacobson
- Written by: Rick Jacobson
- Cinematography by: Dave Garbett
- Editing by: Bryan Shaw
- Original release date: April 29, 2018
- Running time: 31 minutes

Guest appearances
- Jessica Green as Lexx; James Gaylyn as Commander; Reid McGowan as Captain; Colin Garlick as Deputy Masters; Paul Harrop as Hunter; Shayne Blaikie as Bartender; Julia Croft as TV Woman; Kevin Keys as TV Anchor; Arlo MacDiarmid as Businessman; Paul MacDonald as Thin Man; Chris Stewart as Reporter

Episode chronology
← Previous "Judgement Day"	Next → Evil Dead Rise

"The Mettle of Man" is the series finale of the American comedy horror television series Ash vs Evil Dead, which serves as a continuation of the Evil Dead trilogy. It is the tenth episode of the third season and is the 30th overall episode of the series. The episode was written and directed by executive producer Rick Jacobson. It originally aired on the premium channel Starz on April 29, 2018. Nine days prior to broadcast, Starz cancelled the series, and the episode served as the series finale.

The series is set 30 years after the events of the Evil Dead trilogy, and follows Ash Williams, who now works at the "Value Stop" as a simple stock boy. Having spent his life not doing anything remarkable since the events of the trilogy, Ash will have to renounce his routine existence and become a hero once more by taking up arms and facing the titular Evil Dead. In the episode, Ash must fight his biggest battle as Kandar the Destroyer arrives in town and stop the Evil Dead from taking over the world.

According to Nielsen Media Research, the episode was seen by an estimated 0.174 million household viewers and gained a 0.09 ratings share among adults aged 18–49. The episode received critical acclaim from fans and critics, who praised the episode as a fitting end for the character of Ash Williams, also praising the performances, action sequences and emotional weight.

A few days before the airing of the episode, Bruce Campbell announced that he had officially retired from the role of Ash Williams, making the episode his last physical appearance as the character.

== Plot ==
The gigantic creature, Kandar the Destroyer, has arrived at Elk Grove to "test the mettle of man". Taking Kelly's (Dana DeLorenzo) body to his house, Ash (Bruce Campbell), Pablo (Ray Santiago) and Brandy (Arielle Carver-O'Neill) see that news report that evil has taken over the world, and military action is taking place.

Ash is reluctant in facing evil, feeling he is outnumbered. Brandy chastises him for his negligence, telling her she looks forward to him for his heroism. Needing to go back to the hardware store, Pablo takes Kelly's body as he is undetected by evil, while Ash and Brandy leave through the sewers. As Pablo reaches the store, he discovers that Kandar is growing stronger thanks to the level of weaponry used against him. Ash and Brandy are ambushed by Deadites but manage to escape and reach the hardware store and reunite with Pablo. As more Deadites arrive, Pablo enters the Rift while Ash and Brandy fend them off. After they kill them, Pablo returns with Kelly's soul, resurrecting her.

The group leaves outside, discovering that the military have now deployed tanks to kill Kandar. The Kandarian Demon attacks the military forces, forcing them to retreat. Realizing that the military intends to nuke the town, which will by itself make Kandar stronger, Ash decides to face him alone, taking the Kandarian Dagger and sending the evacuated Pablo, Kelly and Brandy away. He commandeers a tank, inserting the dagger inside the barrel. However, he presses the wrong button, giving Kandar the chance to carry the tank. Ash eventually finds the right button and the dagger is thrusted into Kandar. Kandar succumbs to the wound and dies, falling over the tank.

Ash's body is recovered from the wreckage by unknown figures. The figures reveal themselves as Knights of Sumeria, placing Ash into a casket. Sometime later, Ash wakes up from the casket, which is kept in an isolated room, also discovering he has a new augmented hand. Leaving the room, he is guided by a robotic woman in service to him named Lexx (Jessica Green). She shows him that he is in the future, where the world has fallen into chaos, promising to explain later. She shows him his new vehicle: a heavily modified Delta. Ash gets behind the wheel as Lexx enters the car to command a weapon, asking him ("sire") how does he feel. Ash replies "groovy" before driving off.

== Production ==
=== Development ===
The episode was written and directed by executive producer Rick Jacobson. It was Jacobson's second writing credit and sixth directorial credit.

== Reception ==
=== Viewers ===
In its original American broadcast, "The Mettle of Man" was seen by an estimated 0.174 million household viewers and gained a 0.09 ratings share among adults aged 18–49, according to Nielsen Media Research. This means that 0.09 percent of all households with televisions watched the episode. This was a 33% increase in viewership from the previous episode, which was watched by 0.130 million viewers with a 0.05 in the 18-49 demographics.

=== Critical reviews ===
"The Mettle of Man" received critical acclaim. IGN gave the episode a "great" 8.8 out of 10 rating and wrote in its verdict, "If you were looking for closure as Ash vs. Evil Dead left the air for good, 'The Mettle of Man' wasn't going to fully fulfill your desires. Despite its massive time jump/Dark Ones cliffhanger, however, it did wrap up Ash's present day deadite saga while delivering some impressive large-scale action and some even more impressive small-scale emotion."

Michael Roffman of The A.V. Club gave the episode a "B–" grade and wrote, "That focus has never wavered; this has always been Ash's story — hence the title — and really, that's what we got from the very beginning to the very end of Ash Vs. Evil Dead. Not all of it's been perfect, but when it did hit that sweet, groovy spot... we all wanted some. Probably always will."

Stephen Harber of Den of Geek gave the episode a perfect 5 star rating out of 5 and wrote, "And so Ash vs Evil Dead comes to a close, stripping away the side-characters we've grown to know and love as well as the setting of Elk Grove. Ash is on his own again just as he was at the beginning of the series. He's back to being a dangerous (and dangerously funny) man of mystery once more. Even though I will miss Ash vs Evil Dead's presence on the airwaves, as well as a weekly dose of Bruce Campbell in his most recognizable role, I can't think of a better send-off for his character." Steve Ford of TV Fanatic gave the episode a 4.8 star rating out of 5 and wrote, "Sadly, all things must come to an end. And while I'm disappointed that this is the end of the road for Bruce Campbell's iconic role as Ash, the last three seasons of Ash vs Evil Dead have been one hell of a fun ride, and I'm damn grateful to have been a part of it."

Kayla Cobb of Decider wrote, "The last episode of Ash vs. Evil Dead answers very few of the questions it set out to answer. We still don't know exactly why Ash was chosen or what this means for his daughter or his future. But in a way, that's OK. Ash's charms as a hero have always stemmed from knowing half of what he was supposed to do and making up the rest." Sean Aitchison of TV Overmind wrote, "Though the finale was still a fitting end to the franchise (for now), the ambitious teaser for a post-apocalyptic future felt bittersweet. On the one hand, going out in a blaze of glory only to learn that the adventure continues is a fitting end to the franchise and character, but on the other hand, seeing Ash run around this Mad Max-looking future ravaged by The Dark Ones would make for one hell of a final season, or perhaps another film."

Bruce Campbell felt satisfied with the ending, saying "Ash's destiny has been fulfilled. He's not just a guy who lives in a trailer home with a lot of bad habits. There's something else to the guy, and you know what? Let him go on his next great adventure."
