= Home Again (Ash vs Evil Dead) =

- Ash vs Evil Dead episode
- Episode no.: Season 2 Episode 9
- Directed by: Rick Jacobson
- Written by: Jennifer Ames; Steve Turner
- Cinematography by: Dave Garbett
- Editing by: Gary Hunt; Allanah Bazzard
- Original release date: December 4, 2016
- Running time: 27 minutes

Guest appearances
- Ted Raimi as Deadite Henrietta; Nicholas Hope as Professor Raymond Knowby; Sara West as Tanya; Alison Quigan as Henrietta Knowby; Stephen Ure as Drunk

Episode chronology
← Previous "Ashy Slashy"	Next → "Second Coming"

"Home Again" is the ninth episode of the second season of the American comedy horror television series Ash vs Evil Dead, which serves as a continuation of the Evil Dead trilogy. It is the nineteenth overall episode of the series and was written by co-producers Jennifer Ames and Steve Turner, and directed by co-executive producer Rick Jacobson. It originally aired on the premium channel Starz on December 4, 2016.

The series is set 30 years after the events of the Evil Dead trilogy, and follows Ash Williams, who now works at the "Value Stop" as a simple stock boy. Having spent his life not doing anything remarkable since the events of the trilogy, Ash will have to renounce his routine existence and become a hero once more by taking up arms and facing the titular Evil Dead. In the episode, Ash, Kelly and Ruby travel back to 1982 in order to prevent the events at the cabin from happening.

According to Nielsen Media Research, the episode was seen by an estimated 0.266 million household viewers and gained a 0.14 ratings share among adults aged 18–49. The episode received critical acclaim, with critics praising the humor, horror aspects, references to the movies, and character development.

== Plot ==
Ash (Bruce Campbell) has been drinking, distraught over the death of Pablo (Ray Santiago), taking his corpse to ride in his Delta. He hallucinates Pablo telling him that his fate can be changed, by going back in time and undo everything. He takes Ruby (Lucy Lawless) and Kelly (Dana DeLorenzo) into the Delta at high speed, forcing Ruby to transport them back in time.

The Delta arrives at 1982, before the events of the cabin took place. They arrive at the woods, where they are forced to split when the Kandarian Demon approaches them. Ash hides himself in the cabin, while Kelly and Ruby look for him in the woods. Ash accidentally steps on a nail, which starts infecting his leg, forcing him to cut open his leg and expel the liquid, which turns out to be an evil foetus. After a fierce fight, Ash kills the foetus with a frying pan. Hearing a voice from the cellar, Ash descends with his chainsaw.

In the cellar, Ash finds the voice to be coming from Henrietta Knowby (Alison Quigan), who claims to have been trapped and tortured here by her husband. He refuses to believe it, until he hears Professor Raymond Knowby (Nicholas Hope) entering the cabin with one of his students, Tanya (Sara West), with Henrietta claiming he will torture her as well. He takes her to the cellar where she is surprised by Henrietta's presence, causing her to step on a bear trap. Ash then decides to release Henrietta, only to discover from Knowby that he chained her up because she was possessed, intending to use the Necronomicon to transfer the demon from Henrietta to Tanya. She knocks Knowby out, also opening the book.

Back in the woods, Ruby senses that the Necronomicon has been opened. Suddenly, a possessed tree attacks them, attempting to devour them. Seeing its weakness, Ruby uses a stick to stab the tree in its eye, releasing them. At the cellar, Ash tries to release Tanya, but is caught when Henrietta transforms into a bigger monster. Ash tries to attack her with his chainsaw but it gets jammed. A released Tanya tries to stop Knowby from leaving, but he locks them inside while he runs away with the Necronomicon.

== Production ==
=== Development ===
The episode was written by co-producers Jennifer Ames and Steve Turner, and directed by co-executive producer Rick Jacobson. It was Ames' first writing credit, Turner's first writing credit, and Jacobson's third directorial credit.

== Reception ==
=== Viewers ===
In its original American broadcast, "Home Again" was seen by an estimated 0.266 million household viewers and gained a 0.14 ratings share among adults aged 18–49, according to Nielsen Media Research. This means that 0.14 percent of all households with televisions watched the episode. This was a 12% increase in viewership from the previous episode, which was watched by 0.237 million viewers with a 0.12 in the 18-49 demographics.

=== Critical reviews ===
"Home Again" received critical acclaim. Matt Fowler of IGN gave the episode an "amazing" 9 out of 10 rating and wrote in his verdict, "'Home Again' was a sharply funny and maliciously gory chapter that set us up wonderfully for the Season 2 finale. Time traveling back to Necronomicon 'ground zero' is a crazy and unexpected detour that feels like the perfect way to wrap up the season."

Michael Roffman of The A.V. Club gave the episode an "A–" grade and wrote, "With a single eye roll, Dana DeLorenzo sums up the boundless, asinine storytelling of Ash Vs. Evil Dead. There's nothing too weird, too cumbersome, or too crass for this show to handle — simply put, it's in love with its own brazen stupidity."

Stephen Harber of Den of Geek gave the episode a perfect 5 star rating out of 5 and wrote, "It's hard not to come across as a rabid fanboy and laud 'Home Again' with buckets upon buckets of ooey gooey praise." Steve Ford of TV Fanatic gave the episode a 4.5 star rating out of 5 and wrote, "This was a solid episode with a nice nostalgic trip back to a fun decade, and it ended with a nice setup for the season finale." Merrill Barr of Forbes wrote, "Ash vs Evil Dead has had no trouble burning through story like there's no tomorrow this season. Last year, we were one a very clear, one-arc trajectory of getting Ash back to the cabin so he could rid himself of the book once and for all. This season, we have taken on multiple arcs that last two to three episodes at a time. It's been an interesting move that looks to be wrapping up in classic Ash fashion come next week."
