= Delusion (Ash vs Evil Dead) =

- Ash vs Evil Dead episode
- Episode no.: Season 2 Episode 7
- Directed by: Mark Beesley
- Written by: Hank Chilton
- Cinematography by: Dave Garbett
- Editing by: Tom Eagles
- Original release date: November 13, 2016
- Running time: 28 minutes

Guest appearance
- Joel Tobeck as Baal

Episode chronology
← Previous "Trapped Inside"	Next → "Ashy Slashy"

"Delusion" is the seventh episode of the second season of the American comedy horror television series Ash vs Evil Dead, which serves as a continuation of the Evil Dead trilogy. It is the seventeenth overall episode of the series and was written by co-executive producer Hank Chilton, and directed by Mark Beesley. It originally aired on the premium channel Starz on November 13, 2016.

The series is set 30 years after the events of the Evil Dead trilogy, and follows Ash Williams, who now works at the "Value Stop" as a simple stock boy. Having spent his life not doing anything remarkable since the events of the trilogy, Ash will have to renounce his routine existence and become a hero once more by taking up arms and facing the titular Evil Dead. In the episode, Ash finds himself inside an asylum, part of a delusion caused by Baal to break his mind.

According to Nielsen Media Research, the episode was seen by an estimated 0.337 million household viewers and gained a 0.18 ratings share among adults aged 18–49. The episode received extremely positive reviews from critics, who praised the episode's directing, performances, and ending.

== Plot ==
After having a nightmare, Ash (Bruce Campbell) finds himself at an asylum, with no idea of how he got there. His psychiatrist, Dr. Peacock (Joel Tobeck), claims Ash killed four people at a cabin and that everything that he experienced ever since is part of an hallucination. After Ash attacks him, the doctor sedates him.

Ash starts seeing other people in his state, such as Ruby (Lucy Lawless) as a nurse, Kelly (Dana DeLorenzo) as a fellow inmate, and Pablo (Ray Santiago) as an orderly. Ash is also taunted by a puppet that frequently visits him, as well as experiencing a loss of perception of reality. While undergoing electroshock therapy, Dr. Peacock tells Ash that he needs to "kill the book". Ash then decides to incite a riot, upon which he steals Pablo's access card. That night, Ash releases Kelly from her cell and attempt to escape, but the alarm is activated. In her madness, Kelly kills Pablo, claiming he was a demon. When more orderlies arrive, Ash finds that Kelly and Pablo have been mutilated and is blamed for their deaths.

Confined to his cell, Ash is visited by Linda (Michelle Hurd), who tries to reason with him. Ash is moved by their conversation. While staring at the window, he sees three shadowed figures (Pablo, Kelly and Ruby) parking his Delta outside. Moved, he confesses to killing his friends at the cabin. Content with the results, Dr. Peacock tells that he must listen to him and "destroy this delusion", which can only be done by destroying the Necronomicon. Ash accepts it, unaware that this is part of Baal's manipulation. He is released from his straitjacket to follow his orders.

== Production ==
=== Development ===
The episode was written by co-executive producer Hank Chilton, and directed by Mark Beesley. It was Chilton's first writing credit, and Beesley's second directorial credit.

== Reception ==
=== Viewers ===
In its original American broadcast, "Delusion" was seen by an estimated 0.337 million household viewers and gained a 0.18 ratings share among adults aged 18–49, according to Nielsen Media Research. This means that 0.18 percent of all households with televisions watched the episode. This was a slight increase in viewership from the previous episode, which was watched by 0.330 million viewers with a 0.15 in the 18-49 demographics.

=== Critical reviews ===
"Delusion" received extremely positive reviews from critics. Matt Fowler of IGN gave the episode a "great" 8.6 out of 10 rating and wrote in his verdict, "If 'Delusion' had ended with Ash breaking Baal's spell and snapping out of it, the episode wouldn't have really worked. His defeat at the hands of Baal's carefully crafted asylum nightmare showed us Ash succumbing, for the first time, to something other than his own stupidity. It was also a great midway payoff to the entire hometown 'Ashy Slashy' arc of Season 2. Also, there was an Ash puppet."

Michael Roffman of The A.V. Club gave the episode a "B+" grade and wrote, "It was only a matter of time before Ash Vs. Evil Dead went mental. Granted, the series came close last season with 'Brujo', when they dipped into a little psychedelia, but that was more of a spiritual high, one that happened to celebrate the boozy mind of Ashley Williams rather than condemn it. Baal opts for the latter in the remarkably disturbing 'Delusion', which finds our foul-mouthed hero locked up in a nightmarish insane asylum for all the evil deeds he's done. It's a smart, deceitful half-hour of Ken Kesey-inspired storytelling and arguably the first time we've seen the guy forced to question his own sanity since, oh, the opening act of Evil Dead 2."

Stephen Harber of Den of Geek gave the episode a 2 star rating out of 5 and wrote, "I'm sure there will be some of you out there that really enjoyed this episode, and there are things to love about it but it felt like an episode that's just there to fill a space in order to prolong whatever climax is coming up with the season finale a few weeks away." Steve Ford of TV Fanatic gave the episode a 4.5 star rating out of 5 and wrote, "This episode was actually quite toned back with the gore we're accustomed to seeing with this show, but it wasn't really necessary anyway. I'm looking forward to seeing how Ruby, Kelly and the gang defend themselves against Ash, as he's sure to be gunning for Pablo." Merrill Barr of Forbes wrote, "Is it a letdown when a show tries to stretch more story out of a particular arc than perhaps is possible? Yes. However, there are times such a move works and allows for some nice moments of experimentation and what if. This is how we can best describe this week's Ash vs Evil Dead."
