= Ashy Slashy =

- Ash vs Evil Dead episode
- Episode no.: Season 2 Episode 8
- Directed by: Tony Tilse
- Written by: Suzanne Keilly; Aaron Lam
- Cinematography by: Kevin Riley
- Editing by: Allanah Bazzard
- Original release date: November 20, 2016
- Running time: 27 minutes

Guest appearances
- Joel Tobeck as Baal; Stephen Lovatt as Sheriff Thomas Emery

Episode chronology
← Previous "Delusion"	Next → "Home Again"

"Ashy Slashy" is the eighth episode of the second season of the American comedy horror television series Ash vs Evil Dead, which serves as a continuation of the Evil Dead trilogy. It is the eighteenth overall episode of the series and was written by Suzanne Kelly and Aaron Lam, and directed by Tony Tilse. It originally aired on the premium channel Starz on November 20, 2016.

The series is set 30 years after the events of the Evil Dead trilogy, and follows Ash Williams, who now works at the "Value Stop" as a simple stock boy. Having spent his life not doing anything remarkable since the events of the trilogy, Ash will have to renounce his routine existence and become a hero once more by taking up arms and facing the titular Evil Dead. In the episode, Pablo, Kelly and Ruby arrive at the asylum, planning to release Ash from Baal's manipulation.

According to Nielsen Media Research, the episode was seen by an estimated 0.237 million household viewers and gained a 0.12 ratings share among adults aged 18–49. The episode received extremely positive reviews from critics, who praised the action sequences, humor, performances, closure and twist ending.

== Plot ==
Outside the asylum, Pablo (Ray Santiago), Kelly (Dana DeLorenzo) and Ruby (Lucy Lawless) gear up to retrieve Ash (Bruce Campbell). Wandering through the asylum, they encounter Sheriff Emery (Stephen Lovatt), who claims that he got Linda (Michelle Hurd) to help him release Lacey (Pepi Sonuga) from Baal's power.

Lacey suddenly appears, revealing herself to be a Deadite, and beheads Emery after tricking him. Kelly catches up with Lacey, tying her with a hose and then killing her by shooting her head. Kelly is suddenly locked in Ash's cell room, where she is taunted by his puppet. After a fight, she manages to kill the puppet by shooting its head. As they walk, Pablo and Ruby are ambushed by Ash, who plans to destroy the Necronomicon, which are the passages etched on Pablo's skin. Pablo fails to reason with Ash and they are forced to flee from him when he threatens them with his chainsaw.

Kelly is released by Linda, who has discovered the corpses of Emery and Lacey. Instead of giving up, Linda resolves to fight alongside Kelly and take down Baal to avenge her family. Pablo is eventually caught by Ash, who brings him to Baal (Joel Tobeck) just as Kelly and Linda arrive at the room. However, Ash surprises Baal by releasing Pablo, revealing that he never fell victim to his manipulation. After subduing Baal, Pablo performs the spell through the passage, which banishes Baal to Hell. However, the group is horrified to find that Baal managed to slash Pablo in half with his fingernail, killing him.

== Production ==
=== Development ===
The episode was written by Suzanne Keilly and Aaron Lam, and directed by Tony Tilse. It was Keilly's first writing credit, Lam's first writing credit, and Tilse's fifth directorial credit.

== Reception ==
=== Viewers ===
In its original American broadcast, "Ashy Slashy" was seen by an estimated 0.237 million household viewers and gained a 0.12 ratings share among adults aged 18–49, according to Nielsen Media Research. This means that 0.12 percent of all households with televisions watched the episode. This was a 30% decrease in viewership from the previous episode, which was watched by 0.337 million viewers with a 0.18 in the 18-49 demographics.

=== Critical reviews ===
"Ashy Slashy" received extremely positive reviews from critics. Matt Fowler of IGN gave the episode a "great" 8.8 out of 10 rating and wrote in his verdict, "'Ashy Slashy' tragically saw one of the show's core team members -- an original Ghostbeater -- fall in the name of defeating evil. This was a fun, focused episode that featured Ash outsmarting a demon boss known for his wit and cunning while Kelly had a knock-down, drag-out fight with a pest of a puppet."

Michael Roffman of The A.V. Club gave the episode a "B+" grade and wrote, "Bottom line: They all have their own respective quirks, their own drama, their own purpose. And much like Ash, none of us wants to see them lose their souls or get dragged down into the proverbial fruit cellar. Until now, that hasn't happened, which is why there's a certain sting to 'Ashy Slashy.'"

Stephen Harber of Den of Geek gave the episode a 3.5 star rating out of 5 and wrote, "Any way you slice it, 'Ashy Slashy' is a mostly solid episode that is entertaining and diligent to continuing its story arcs even if the eponymous character is incapacitated for a large part of its duration." Steve Ford of TV Fanatic gave the episode a 4 star rating out of 5 and wrote, "This was one wild and crazy episode. The defeat of Baal and shocking ending was set up more as a season finale, but I'm glad we still have two more episodes to go!" Merrill Barr of Forbes wrote, "Last week, Ash vs Evil Dead used its half hour format to its advantage by not revealing whether or not Ash’s experience in the asylum was real. Now, after watching 'Ashy Slashy', its clear last week and this week's episode are meant to be viewed as a single hour long story as they meld right into one another. However, where this week's episode leaves the show is far more gut-wrenching (no pun intended) than last week."
