= Family (Ash vs Evil Dead) =

- Ash vs Evil Dead episode
- Episode no.: Season 3 Episode 1
- Directed by: Mark Beesley
- Written by: Mark Verheiden
- Cinematography by: Dave Garbett
- Editing by: Bryan Shaw
- Original release date: February 25, 2018
- Running time: 27 minutes

Guest appearances
- Katrina Hobbs as Candace Barr; Ellie Gall as Rachel Manning; Jeffrey Thomas as Stanley Gibson; Albertine Jonas as Amy; Ross Anderson as Minister; Sophia Nathan as Clerk

Episode chronology
← Previous "Second Coming"	Next → "Booth Three"

"Family" is the first episode of the third season of the American comedy horror television series Ash vs Evil Dead, which serves as a continuation of the Evil Dead trilogy. It is the 21st overall episode of the series and was written by Mark Verheiden, and directed by Mark Beesley. It originally aired on the premium channel Starz on February 25, 2018.

The series is set 30 years after the events of the Evil Dead trilogy, and follows Ash Williams, who now works at the "Value Stop" as a simple stock boy. Having spent his life not doing anything remarkable since the events of the trilogy, Ash will have to renounce his routine existence and become a hero once more by taking up arms and facing the titular Evil Dead. In the episode, Ash is forced to fight against evil once again, after the Necronomicon is found again.

According to Nielsen Media Research, the episode was seen by an estimated 0.225 million household viewers and gained a 0.10 ratings share among adults aged 18–49. The episode received positive reviews from critics, who praised the new storylines, humor and action sequences.

== Plot ==
Ash (Bruce Campbell) has opened his brand new hardware store, Ashy Slashy's, with Pablo (Ray Santiago) working alongside him. During a "Treasures from the Rift" exhibition, a woman brings out the Necronomicon, which was found in the woods. The speaker reads from the book, causing the Kandarian Demon to attack the place. Ruby (Lucy Lawless) arrives and kills the speaker for the book. Later, she reads from the book while smearing blood, causing something to move inside her stomach.

At Kenward County High School, two girls are attacked by the demon, who has possessed a boy in the school's mascot suit. One of the girls calls her mother, Candace Barr (Katrina Hobbs). Candace approaches Ash, revealing that they slept together and that her daughter, Brandy (Arielle Carver-O'Neill), is also Ash's daughter and needs his help. They go to the high school, encountering the girls and informing Brandy of Ash's role. However, Brandy's friend turns out to be a Deadite, who attacks the group with musical instruments. She kills Candace with a cymbal, prompting an angered Ash to kill the friend with a harp.

The possessed boy in the mascot attacks the group, with Ash and Pablo unable to defeat it. However, Kelly (Dana DeLorenzo) shows up with a man (Lindsay Farris) and kills the Deadite with a grenade. She presents the man as Dalton, a Knight of Sumeria, who idolizes Ash. Ash intends to fight evil once again, as he presents them to Brandy, who is disturbed after the events that took place.

== Production ==
=== Development ===
The episode was written by Mark Verheiden, and directed by Mark Beesley. It was Verheiden's first writing credit, and Beesley's third directorial credit.

== Reception ==
=== Viewers ===
In its original American broadcast, "Family" was seen by an estimated 0.225 million household viewers and gained a 0.10 ratings share among adults aged 18–49, according to Nielsen Media Research. This means that 0.10 percent of all households with televisions watched the episode. This was a 17% decrease in viewership from the previous episode, which was watched by 0.269 million viewers with a 0.14 in the 18-49 demographics.

=== Critical reviews ===
"Family" received positive reviews from critics. Michael Roffman of The A.V. Club gave the episode a "B" grade and wrote, "'Family' is a table-setting episode that also brings the meat, and that's exactly what Ash Vs. Evil Dead needed after that abysmal season finale. To his credit, Verheiden is hip to that notion: When Pablo talks up Ash to Candy, sounding exactly like Louis Tully, there's a tongue-in-cheek humility to his recap, as he explains, 'There was this one time I got cut in half, but Ash went back in time to save me. It was so cool. But also really weird because when we got back, nothing seemed to have changed.' That's the beauty of this franchise. You just need to get a little stupid and things start looking really, really smart."

Stephen Harber of Den of Geek gave the episode a perfect 5 star rating out of 5 and wrote, "Like any worthwhile season premiere, 'Family' leaves you wanting more and makes you fall in love with characters you missed spending time with again. It uses its past as a foundation and a springboard to launch itself into greener (and gorier) pastures. It also reminds us that no matter how often the circumstances change, Ash is still going to be Ash no matter what. That’s why we keep tuning in."

Steve Ford of TV Fanatic gave the episode a 4 star rating out of 5 and wrote, "All in all, this was a solid episode and a great way to get things going again after a 14-month break in between seasons. The band is finally back together with a couple of noble additions to the team. Season 3 already has a vibrant and different look to it." Bryan Kristopowitz of 411Mania gave the episode an 8 out of 10 rating and wrote, "Ash vs. Evil Dead is finally back with its third season premiere and it's awesome. The episode could have used a little more time establish the world Ash and company currently find themselves in. I love how the show, as a whole, is designed to not waste time, but it would have benefited everyone if this episode had been extended a few minutes. It's still a hoot, though, and I can't wait to see what happens next. Ash vs. Evil Dead is back and that's really, really awesome."
