= Apparently Dead =

- Ash vs Evil Dead episode
- Episode no.: Season 3 Episode 3
- Directed by: Diego & Andres Meza-Valdes
- Written by: Ivan Raimi
- Cinematography by: Dave Garbett
- Editing by: Bryan Shaw
- Original release date: March 11, 2018
- Running time: 31 minutes

Guest appearances
- Lee Majors as Brock Williams; Katrina Hobbs as Candace Barr; Hannah Tasker-Poland as Masked Woman; Richard Felix as Funeral Director

Episode chronology
← Previous "Booth Three"	Next → "Unfinished Business"

"Apparently Dead" is the third episode of the third season of the American comedy horror television series Ash vs Evil Dead, which serves as a continuation of the Evil Dead trilogy. It is the 23rd overall episode of the series and was written by co-creator Ivan Raimi, and directed by Diego and Andres Meza-Valdes. It originally aired on the premium channel Starz on March 11, 2018.

The series is set 30 years after the events of the Evil Dead trilogy, and follows Ash Williams, who now works at the "Value Stop" as a simple stock boy. Having spent his life not doing anything remarkable since the events of the trilogy, Ash will have to renounce his routine existence and become a hero once more by taking up arms and facing the titular Evil Dead. In the episode, Ash makes a bad impression on Brandy, who considers moving out of his house. Meanwhile, Kelly, Pablo and Dalton search for the dagger when Ruby returns.

According to Nielsen Media Research, the episode was seen by an estimated 0.160 million household viewers and gained a 0.08 ratings share among adults aged 18–49. The episode received extremely positive reviews from critics, who praised the comedic elements, action scenes, performances and writing.

== Plot ==
Ash (Bruce Campbell) attends Candace's funeral, intending to be more involved with Brandy (Arielle Carver-O'Neill). Alone, he checks the corpse to see if she was possessed, which appears to not be the case. However, the body disappears and appears as a Deadite who attacks him. Ash beheads her but accidentally gets stuck in her casket. During the funeral, Ash finally steps out, embarrassing Brandy.

Ash finds Ruby (Lucy Lawless) at the funeral, under the guise of Ms. Prevett. Ash confronts her but Brandy defends her and dismisses Ash's claims. He informs Pablo (Ray Santiago), Kelly (Dana DeLorenzo) and Dalton (Lindsay Farris) about her return, deducing they must retrieve the Kandarian Dagger to stop her. During this, Pablo receives another vision from the spirit, where he is instructed that they must go to the cabin to retrieve the dagger. Brandy is taken home by Ruby, convincing her that she can stay with her, and goes packing her stuff. Ruby leaves for the cemetery, where she performs a ritual over a gravestone, which resurrects the person.

At the woods, Pablo, Kelly and Dalton dig throughout the place to find the dagger. Kelly eventually finds it, but are ambushed by the Kandarian Demon. The Demon ambushes Dalton and Kelly finds him impaled on a branch, with Dalton claiming that Pablo was responsible. Before the Deadite Dalton attacks her, Pablo runs over him with a truck. When Kelly checks on the truck, Pablo is gone. The resurrected person arrives at Ash's house and takes a shower. When Ash arrives, he finds Brandy talking with the person, Brock (Lee Majors). Brandy believes Brock's claim that his death was just an accident and has bonded with him.

Ash confronts Brock at the kitchen, who throws a can at him but accidentally hits Brandy in the head, knocking her unconscious. Brock and Ash then engage in a brutal fight throughout the house. As Brandy starts recovering, Ash uses his chainsaw to kill Brock, in front of Brandy. Before Ash explains, Brandy angrily leaves the house.

== Production ==
=== Development ===
The episode was written by co-creator Ivan Raimi, and directed by Diego and Andres Meza-Valdes. It was Raimi's fourth writing credit, and Valdes' directorial credit.

== Reception ==
=== Viewers ===
In its original American broadcast, "Apparently Dead" was seen by an estimated 0.160 million household viewers and gained a 0.08 ratings share among adults aged 18–49, according to Nielsen Media Research. This means that 0.08 percent of all households with televisions watched the episode. This was a slight decrease in viewership from the previous episode, which was watched by 0.171 million viewers with a 0.07 in the 18-49 demographics.

=== Critical reviews ===
"Apparently Dead" received extremely positive reviews from critics. Michael Roffman of The A.V. Club gave the episode an "A–" grade and wrote, "This is a good place to be so early in the season. Ash Vs. Evil Dead thrives on chaos and 'Apparently Dead' delivers the madness by the truckload and with plenty to spare. By now, showrunner Mark Verheiden has successfully cast off any of the demons left behind after last season's shakeup, forging ahead with a tone that's considerate of everything Craig DiGregorio masterfully pieced together while also adding some much-needed severity. Again, it's all about family this season, and the coarse relationship between Ash and Brandy is at the meaty center, revealing truths about our prophesied hero that we've never thought to ask but always wanted to know."

Stephen Harber of Den of Geek gave the episode a perfect 5 star rating out of 5 and wrote, "The cast is on fire (most of the time, not literally), the jokes are ricocheting around the scenery like stray cartoon bullets, and the gore is flowing more smoothly than it has in years. With a clear plot structure in mind, this show has finally mastered the art of sequential storytelling."

Steve Ford of TV Fanatic gave the episode a 3.5 star rating out of 5 and wrote, "I haven't been the biggest fan of Dalton since coming on board, but I feel he really could have grown into becoming a vital member of the group. As much as I love Ash, Kelly, and Pablo, I was very much open to exploring the possibility of expanding upon the group." Bryan Kristopowitz of 411Mania gave the episode a 9.5 out of 10 rating and wrote, "'Apparently Dead' is Ash vs. Evil Dead back in top form. It's an episode that's rude, crude, messed up, and funny as all hooha, like the best AvED episodes."
