= Booth Three =

- Ash vs Evil Dead episode
- Episode no.: Season 3 Episode 2
- Directed by: Mark Beesley
- Written by: Rob Fresco
- Cinematography by: Dave Garbett
- Editing by: Gary Hunt
- Original release date: March 4, 2018
- Running time: 30 minutes

Guest appearances
- Samantha Young as Natalie; Helene Wong as Mrs Lam; Mark Sole as Eric; Debbie Newby-Ward as Marci; Hannah Tasker-Poland as Masked Woman; Sarah Overwater as Glamour Girl

Episode chronology
← Previous "Family"	Next → "Apparently Dead"

"Booth Three" is the second episode of the third season of the American comedy horror television series Ash vs Evil Dead, which serves as a continuation of the Evil Dead trilogy. It is the 22nd overall episode of the series and was written by co-executive producer Rob Fresco, and directed by Mark Beesley. It originally aired on the premium channel Starz on March 4, 2018.

The series is set 30 years after the events of the Evil Dead trilogy, and follows Ash Williams, who now works at the "Value Stop" as a simple stock boy. Having spent his life not doing anything remarkable since the events of the trilogy, Ash will have to renounce his routine existence and become a hero once more by taking up arms and facing the titular Evil Dead. In the episode, Ash tries to build a relationship with his daughter, while Pablo experiences hallucinations.

According to Nielsen Media Research, the episode was seen by an estimated 0.171 million household viewers and gained a 0.07 ratings share among adults aged 18–49. The episode received extremely positive reviews from critics, who praised the humor, action scenes, character development and performances.

== Plot ==
While driving, Ruby (Lucy Lawless) is experiencing severe pain following the ritual. She stops the car and gives birth to a new spawn, which seems to be modeled after Ash (Bruce Campbell). As a couple stop to help, Ruby and the spawn kill the man and kidnap the woman, Natalie (Samantha Young).

Ash lets Brandy (Arielle Carver-O'Neill) stay in his house, who is still haunted by her mother's death. Pablo (Ray Santiago) is informed by Dalton (Lindsay Farris) that the Knights of Sumeria are a group that protects the world from the Deadites, having served for centuries and believing that Ash would be the one to defeat evil. Ash then drives Brandy to school, hoping to start a bond between them. Still mourning, Brandy visits the school's guidance counselor, Ms. Prevett, who is actually Ruby. She tells her about Ash as her father, surprising Ruby and making her see that she cannot trust him.

Pablo is haunted by hallucinations just as more passages keep etching on his skin. During an hallucination, he is visited by a spirit that informs him that he must become El Brujo as evil is taking over his body. He is approached by Kelly (Dana DeLorenzo) and Dalton, with the latter noting the writing on his skin. After he leaves, Dalton expresses that something bad will happen and that he must be killed if it is necessary. She questions Pablo and reaffirms her concerns, but Pablo states he is completely fine.

Due to a comment by Kelly, Ash visits a sperm bank to see if someone used his sperm. Staring at the pornographic magazines, he decides to make a donation. However, the Kandarian Demon enters the bank and possesses a clerk and causes a woman from Ash's magazine to attack him. Ash fights the Deadite, eventually killing it with a nitrogen tank. He returns to Kelly and Pablo, concluding that he now must protect Brandy. That night, Ruby visits Natalie at an attic, also feeding her baby with the man's body parts. Ruby states that she is giving her baby strength to eventually grow and kill Ash.

== Production ==
=== Development ===
The episode was written by co-executive producer Rob Fresco, and directed by Mark Beesley. It was Fresco's first writing credit, and Beesley's fourth directorial credit.

== Reception ==
=== Viewers ===
In its original American broadcast, "Booth Three" was seen by an estimated 0.171 million household viewers and gained a 0.07 ratings share among adults aged 18–49, according to Nielsen Media Research. This means that 0.07 percent of all households with televisions watched the episode. This was a 24% decrease in viewership from the previous episode, which was watched by 0.225 million viewers with a 0.10 in the 18-49 demographics.

=== Critical reviews ===
"Booth Three" received extremely positive reviews from critics. Michael Roffman of The A.V. Club gave the episode an "A–" grade and wrote, "So, it was only a matter of time that Ash would face sperm, but here's the thing: The genius of the scene isn't in the idea, but in the execution. At this point, Ash Vs. Evil Dead is so goddamn self aware that these adrenalized moments are too easy to fumble, and director Mark Beesley and writer Rob Fresco dance towards the end zone with 'Booth Three.' It's how they paint Ash not only as a regular of the Elk Grove Cryo Bank, but a legend."

Stephen Harber of Den of Geek gave the episode a perfect 5 star rating out of 5 and wrote, "'Booth Three' is an impressive follow-up to a fast and fun season premiere. It maintains the same manic sense of glee that pervaded throughout 'Family,' but it quickly gets serious about its mythology in a way Ash vs Evil Dead has never done before, giving us actual, honest-to-goodness exposition about what exactly the forces of Evil itself are up to. And it's not half-assed like it used to be, either."

Steve Ford of TV Fanatic gave the episode a 4.5 star rating out of 5 and wrote, "Ash vs Evil Dead continues to push the envelope, and at only the second episode, we're just getting started." Bryan Kristopowitz of 411Mania gave the episode an 8 out of 10 rating and wrote, "Booth Three has a shaky start, but once we see the Ghostbeaters trying to figure out what to do next the episode kicks it into high gear and is entertaining as hell. The sperm bank brawl may not be as gory as previous slapstick Ash vs. Evil Dead brawls, but it sure is gross as fuck."
