= Cheryl Williams =

Cheryl Williams may refer to:

- Cheryl Williams (footballer), footballer with London Bees
- Cheryl Williams (Evil Dead), fictional character in Evil Dead
