= List of Evil Dead characters =

The following is a list of characters in Evil Dead, a supernatural horror franchise created by director Sam Raimi.

== Main cast and characters ==
List indicators
- This table only shows characters that have appeared in three or more films in the series.
- A dark gray cell indicates that the character was not in the film or that the character's presence in the film has yet to be announced.
- A ^{P} indicates the actor portrayed the possessed version of the character.
- An ^{A} indicates an appearance through archival footage or stills.
- A ^{C} indicates a cameo role.
- An ^{M} indicates the actor was part of the main cast for the season.
- An ^{R} indicates the actor was part of the recurring cast for the season.
- A ^{G} indicates the actor was part of the guest cast for the season.
- An ^{S} indicates a role shared with another actor.
- A ^{U} indicates an uncredited role.
- A ^{V} indicates a voice-only role.
- A ^{Pic} indicates the actor appears on picture.

Character		Original series			Ash vs Evil Dead			Standalone films			
Character		The Evil Dead	Evil Dead II	Army of Darkness	Season 1	Season 2	Season 3	Evil Dead	Evil Dead Rise	Evil Dead Burn	Evil Dead Wrath
Character		1981	1987	1992	2015–16	2016	2018	2013	2023	2026	2028
=== Protagonists ===
Ashley "Ash" Williams		Bruce Campbell	Bruce Campbell	Bruce Campbell	Bruce Campbell^{M}	Bruce Campbell^{M}	Bruce Campbell^{M}	Bruce Campbell^{U}^{C}	Bruce Campbell^{U}^{C}^{V}	Mentioned	
Pablo Simon Bolivar					Ray Santiago^{M}	Ray Santiago^{M}	Ray Santiago^{M}				
Kelly Maxwell					Dana DeLorenzo^{M}	Dana DeLorenzo^{M}	Dana DeLorenzo^{M}				
Ruby Knowby Rebecca Prevett					Lucy Lawless^{M}	Lucy Lawless^{M}	Lucy Lawless^{M}				
Brandy Barr							Arielle Carver-O'Neill^{M}				
Mia Allen								Jane Levy			
David Allen								Shiloh Fernandez		Mentioned	
Bethany "Beth" Bixler									Lily Sullivan		
Kassie Bixler									Nell Fisher		
Alice Price										Souheila Yacoub	
TBA											Charlotte Hope
=== Deadites ===
The Evil Dead(ites)		Sam Raimi^{V}	William Preston Robertson^{V}	Ted Raimi^{V}	Various^{V}	Various^{V}	Various^{V}	Rupert Degas^{V}	Alyssa Sutherland^{V}	Luciane Buchanan^{V}	TBA
Linda		Betsy Baker	Denise Bixler Snowy Winters^{P}^{S}	Bridget Fonda	Rebekkah Farrell						
Cheryl Williams		Ellen Sandweiss				Ellen Sandweiss		Ellen Sandweiss^{C}^{V}^{A}			
Scott "Scotty"		Richard DeManincor									
Bad/Evil Ash			Bruce Campbell	Bruce Campbell	Bruce Campbell		Bruce Campbell				
Henrietta Knowby			Lou Hancock Ted Raimi^{P}^{S}			Alison Quigan Ted Raimi^{P}^{S}					
Professor Ed Getley			Richard Domeier								
The Mini-Ashes				Bruce Campbell Bruce Thomas Deke Anderson Jerry Rector							
Deadite Captain				Bill Moseley							
Possessed Witch				Patricia Tallman							
Vivian Johnson					Siân Davis^{G}			Siân Davis			
Amanda Fisher					Jill Marie Jones^{M}						
Little Lori					Bridget Hoffmann^{V}						
Heather					Samara Weaving^{G}						
Chet Kaminski						Ted Raimi^{M}					
Sheriff Thomas Emery						Stephen Lovatt^{R}					
Lacey Emery						Pepi Sonuga^{R}					
Eric								Lou Taylor Pucci		Mentioned	
Olivia								Jessica Lucas		Mentioned	
Natalie								Elizabeth Blackmore		Mentioned	
Abomination Mia								Randal Wilson			
The Marauder	Ellie Bixler								Alyssa Sutherland	Alyssa Sutherland^{C}	
The Marauder	Bridget Bixler								Gabrielle Echols		
The Marauder	Danny Bixler								Morgan Davies		
Jessica									Anna-Maree Thomas Greta Van Den Brink^{P}^{S}	Greta Van Den Brink	
Susan Price										Tandi Wright	
Joseph Price										Hunter Doohan	
Thya										Luciane Buchanan	
Edgar Price										Erroll Shand	
Polly Price										Maude Davey	
William "Will" Price										George Pullar	
=== Recurring characters ===
Shelly		Theresa Tilly									
Professor Raymond Knowby		Bob Dorian^{V}	John Peaks			Nicholas Hope^{G}		Bob Dorian^{C}^{V}^{A}		Mentioned	
Annie Knowby			Sarah Berry							Mentioned	
Lord Arthur				Marcus Gilbert							
Duke Henry the Red				Richard Grove							
Jenny				Angela Featherstone							
El Brujo					Hemky Madera^{R}		Hemky Madera^{G}				
Eligos					Ben Fransham^{R} Jared Turner^{V}						
Baal						Joel Tobeck^{R}					
Tanya						Sara West^{R}					
Brock Williams						Lee Majors^{R}	Lee Majors^{G}				
=== Other characters ===
Jake (Evil Dead II)			Dan Hicks								
Bobby Joe			Kassie DePaiva								
Sheila				Embeth Davidtz							
Wiseman				Ian Abercrombie							
Linda B. Emery						Michelle Hurd^{M}					
Dalton							Lindsay Farris^{M}				
Caleb									Richard Crouchley		
Teresa									Mirabai Pease	Severed head	
Gabriel									Jayden Daniels		
Jake (Evil Dead Rise)									Billy Reynolds-McCarthy		
Scott (Evil Dead Rise)									Tai Wano		
Mr. Fonda									Mark Mitchinson		
Father Marcus Littleton									Mark Mitchinson^{V}		
Leo										Victory Ndukwe	
Jared										Keanu Karim	
Mike										Tapiwa Soropa	
Professor Benjamin Price										Michael Hurst^{V}	

=== Additional crew and production details ===
Role
Role	The Evil Dead	Evil Dead II	Army of Darkness	Evil Dead	Ash vs Evil Dead	Evil Dead Rise	Evil Dead Burn	Evil Dead Wrath
Composer	Joseph LoDuca	Joseph LoDuca	Joseph LoDuca; Danny Elfman (themes)	Roque Baños	Joseph LoDuca	Stephen McKeon	Double Danger	TBA
Cinematographer	Tim Philo	Peter Deming	Bill Pope	Aaron Morton	Dave Garbett; John Cavill	Dave Garbett	Philip Lozano	TBA
Editor	Edna Ruth Paul	Kaye Davis	Bob Murawski; R.O.C. Sandstorm	Bryan Shaw	Bob Murawski	Bryan Shaw	Maxime Caro	TBA
Production companies	Renaissance Pictures	Renaissance Pictures; Rosebud Releasing	Renaissance Pictures; Dino De Laurentiis Communications	FilmDistrict; Ghost House Pictures; TriStar Pictures	Renaissance Pictures; Starz Originals	Ghost House Pictures; New Line Cinema	New Line Cinema; Ghost House Pictures; Screen Gems	New Line Cinema; Ghost House Pictures; Screen Gems
Distributing companies	New Line Cinema	De Laurentiis Entertainment Group	Universal Pictures	Sony Pictures Releasing	Anchor Bay Entertainment	Warner Bros. Pictures	Warner Bros. Pictures (United States and Canada); Sony Pictures Releasing International (International)	
Running time	85 minutes	84 minutes	81 minutes	92 minutes	25–37 minutes	97 minutes	109 minutes	TBA

== Characters ==
=== Main characters ===
==== Ash Williams ====
Ashley J. Williams

Ash
- Appears in: Evil Dead series
- Gender: Male
- Race/Nationality: Caucasian American
- Height: 6 ft 1 in (185 cm)
- Hair: Black
- Eyes: Brown
- Age: 25 (The Evil Dead, Evil Dead II, Army of Darkness, and Evil Dead: Regeneration); 57 (Ash vs Evil Dead)
- Family: Brock Williams (father); Cheryl Williams (younger sister, deceased); Evil Ash (clone); Brandy Barr-Williams (daughter)
- Location: Elk Grove, Michigan
- Weapons of Choice: "Boomstick" (12 Gauge Remington Sawed-Off Shotgun); Chainsaw
- Allies: Henry The Red; King Arthur Pablo Kelly
- Enemies: "Deadites" (demon-possessed living or undead); Evil Ash
- Status: Alive
- Portrayed by: Bruce Campbell (all films & video games) Danny Webber (Poker Night 2)

Ashley Joanna Williams is the protagonist the entire series. Ash evolves over the course of the series from a cowardly college student to a wise cracking Deadite slayer with his detachable hand chainsaw and 12 gauge "boomstick". Ash was portrayed in nearly every Evil Dead incarnation by cult actor Bruce Campbell, with the only exceptions being the Poker Night 2 video game (where he was voiced by Danny Webber), and in the musical adaptation, in which he has been played by multiple people.

==== Linda ====
Linda

Linda
- Appears in: Evil Dead series
- Gender: Female
- Race/Nationality: Caucasian American
- Height: 5 ft 6 in (168 cm)
- Hair: Blonde
- Eyes: Green
- Age: 22 (The Evil Dead); 24 (Evil Dead II); 27 (Army of Darkness)
- Family: Ashley J. Williams (boyfriend)
- Location: Elk Grove, Michigan
- Status: Deceased
- Portrayed by: Betsy Baker (The Evil Dead); Denise Bixler (Evil Dead II); Bridget Fonda (Army of Darkness); Rebekkah Farrell Ash vs. Evil Dead}
- Voiced by: Betsy Baker (Evil Dead: The Game)

Linda is Ash's girlfriend throughout the series. She is very much in love with Ash and keeps a necklace he gave her close to her at all times. In the first film, Evil Cheryl stabs her in the ankle with a pencil and is unable to be moved out of the cabin. After Scotty leaves, Linda becomes possessed and taunts Ash until she is dragged outside of the cabin and returns to attack Ash. After a struggle, Ash buries her outside and places a crude cross at her grave only to have her burst from the ground and tear at his leg. Once entirely free from the grave she runs at Ash who swings his shovel and takes off her head.

In the second film, Linda is shown in the re-cap of the first film at the beginning of this film. In this version she dies the same way (decapitation), however, she rises yet again. Once Ash returns to the cabin she escapes from her grave and dances headless outside the cabin. Ash watches as her head rolls along the ground and up her body to rest on her neck, unmoving. Linda then reaches out to Ash and drops her head in his lap. She bites hard into Ash's hand and he can only remove her by crushing her head in a vise and roughly tearing his hand away. Ash is then attacked by the body of Linda, who is now wielding a chainsaw, he manages to get the upper hand and Linda is killed once again; first her body, then her head.

In the third film, Linda is shown in Ash's flashback as he is being dragged through the sand by Arthur's men. Linda is attacked by the evil through a window in this version, much like Shelly was in the first film.

In the TV series, Linda's head makes an appearance in the episode Ashes to Ashes.

Linda is the only character to appear (or even be mentioned) in all three films and also the only character who did not originally appear in Within the Woods. She is played by four different actresses, In the first film, she is played by Betsy Baker, in the second by Denise Bixler, in the third by Bridget Fonda and in the TV series by Rebekkah Farrell.

==== Evil Ash ====
Evil Ash is the evil incarnation of Ash Williams and the primary antagonist of the series. He is portrayed by Bruce Campbell.

In Evil Dead II, Evil Ash briefly possessed Ash during the beginning of the film before the day breaks which returns Ash to normal. Later, Evil Ash once again resurfaces and attacks both Annie and Jake (With the latter being killed by Henrietta afterwards). However, after seeing Linda's necklace, Ash fights control over the spiritual deadite and is defeated once more.

In Army of Darkness, He was first seen in the form of Tiny Ashes jumping out from a mirror after Ash was chased into a windmill by the Evil Force, and one jumping down his throat. It was then that his dark side manifested in physical form and split from him. Ash killed him by a shotgun blow to the head and buried him, but he was resurrected when Ash misspoke the words of the Necronomicon. He led the army of darkness against Arthur and also possesses Sheila, hinting that he (or at least the deadite version of him) is a combination of Ash's dark side and the Evil Force (supported by a statement made by Wiseman), only to be killed again by Ash at the end of the battle.

In the first season of Ash vs. Evil Dead, Evil Ash grows into being from Ash's severed hand and killed Amanda after she chopped off the still-decayed hand and chopped it into pieces. After a fist fight with Ash, Evil Ash is killed by Kelly and Pablo before being dismembered again in Bound in Flesh.

==== Mia Allen ====
Mia Allen

Mia
- Appears in: Evil Dead (2013)
- Gender: Female
- Race/Nationality: Caucasian American
- Height: 5 ft 2 in (157 cm)
- Hair: Brown
- Eyes: Blue
- Age: 20
- Family: Mrs. Allen (mother, deceased); David Allen (older brother, deceased)
- Location: Michigan
- Status: Alive
- Portrayed by: Jane Levy

Mia Allen is the main protagonist of the 2013 reboot of the series. She is the sister of David, and a friend of Olivia and Eric's. She is a recovering heroin addict, and her going cold turkey is the reason the characters traveled to the cabin in the first place. She is the only survivor of her group of friends, and one of the few people who have defeated the demons of the book.

=== Supporting characters in The Evil Dead ===
==== Cheryl Williams ====
Cheryl Williams

Cheryl
- Appears in: The Evil Dead Ash vs Evil Dead Season Two
- Gender: Female
- Race/Nationality: Caucasian American
- Height: 5 ft 6 in (168 cm)
- Hair: Ginger
- Eyes: Green
- Age: 20
- Location: Elk Grove, Michigan
- Family: Ash Williams (brother) Brock Williams (father)
- Status: Deceased
- Portrayed by: Ellen Sandweiss (The Evil Dead, Ash vs Evil Dead)
- Voiced by: Ellen Sandweiss (Evil Dead: The Game)

Cheryl Williams is Ash's sister and the odd woman out in the group. She is the first to sense the danger surrounding the cabin and is entirely ignored by her friends. Even after returning to the cabin battered, bruised, and half naked after being brutally raped by the possessed trees her friends dismiss her and decide she must have been attacked by an animal. She is the first of the group to become possessed by the Evil and attacks Linda with a pencil. To prevent further injury to the others, she is locked in the cellar where she eventually escapes and together with Evil Scotty attacks Ash, beating the latter with a fireplace poker. She meets the same fate as Scotty when the Book of the Dead is destroyed in the fireplace.

Cheryl reappears as one of the antagonists in the sixth episode of Ash vs Evil Dead Season Two. Ash is forced to kill his sister for a second time when Cheryl is reborn after a photo of her is struck by the Kandarian Demon. She confronts Ash in a fight which results in his old friend Chet being killed. Cheryl re-appears in the finale of season two, first as an illusion by Baal, the main antagonist and later as a ghost seen in the background of a crowd with her father Brock, and Chet.

==== Scotty ====
Scott

Scotty
- Appears in: The Evil Dead
- Gender: Male
- Race/Nationality: Caucasian American
- Height: 5 ft 11 in (180 cm)
- Hair: Blond
- Eyes: Blue
- Age: 24
- Family: Shelly (girlfriend)
- Location: Elk Grove, Michigan
- Status: Deceased
Portrayed by:	Scott Spiegel (Within the Woods)	Richard Demanincor (The Evil Dead)

Scotty was good looking, cocky and a bit of a clown. He is initially set up as the hero of the film, being the most proactive in fighting the Deadites, until being forced to kill his girlfriend, Shelly, who became possessed by the Evil. Soon after her demise, he abandons Ash and an injured Linda and tries to escape through the woods. Scotty later returns, severely injured and lacerated, having been attacked by the possessed trees. Scotty bleeds out, and his corpse is possessed and turned into a Deadite. He and Cheryl attack Ash, until he burns the Necronomicon in the fireplace, causing Scotty and Cheryl to decompose and rot, killing the demons possessing them in the process. According to producer Rob Tapert in the commentary for Evil Dead II, a version of the recap had Scotty in it.

==== Shelly ====
Shelly
- Shelly
- Appears in: The Evil Dead
- Gender: Female
- Race/Nationality: Caucasian American
- Height: 5 ft 5 in (165 cm)
- Hair: Brown
- Eyes: Brown
- Age: 23
- Family: Scotty (boyfriend)
- Location: Elk Grove, Michigan
- Status: Deceased
- Portrayed by: Theresa Tilly (The Evil Dead)

Shelly is Scotty's girlfriend. After Cheryl is possessed, Shelly retreats back to her room where she is possessed by the Evil which hurls itself through a window. Soon after she viciously attacks Scotty who has no choice but to stab her, and when she survives he dismembers her with an axe. Ash and Scotty bury her remains outside the cabin. According to producer Rob Tapert in the commentary for Evil Dead II, a version of the recap had Shelly in it.

=== Supporting characters in Evil Dead II ===
==== Annie Knowby ====
Annie Knowby
- Annie
- Appears in: Evil Dead II
- Gender: Female
- Race/Nationality: Caucasian American
- Height: 5 ft ? in (152–180 cm)
- Hair: Blonde
- Eyes: Brown
- Age: 25
- Family: Professor Knowby (father); Henrietta Knowby (mother); Ruby Knowby (sister)
- Location: Dearborn, Michigan
- Status: Deceased
- Portrayed by: Sarah Berry (Evil Dead II)
- Voiced by: Cissy Jones (Evil Dead: The Game)

Annie is Professor Knowby's and Henrietta's daughter. She travels to the cabin to proceed with her research on the book of the dead, which her father was also pursuing. Throughout most of the film she is just an observer, she doesn't actually get in on the action until most of her comrades are dead. When Ash is possessed by the Evil she runs inside and accidentally stabs an already injured Jake in the chest with the Kandarian Dagger. Annie drags him down the hall and into the cabin's main room. She then desperately tries to pull Jake back from the clutches of Evil Henrietta when she learns she left Jake too close to the cellar opening but it's to no avail.

Later when she learns that Ash is back to his old self again both she and Ash decide to gather up the pages of the book and finish off the Evil. In the middle of reading, she is stabbed by Ash's evil hand. She finishes translating the text before she dies. She was portrayed by Sarah Berry.

A Deadite-possessed Annie returns as a boss in Evil Dead: Hail to the King, where Ash fights her in a fruit cellar for the Kandarian Dagger.

Annie Knowby is the main character of Space Goat Publishing's Evil Dead 2 comic series.

==== Jake ====
Jake
- Jake
- Appears in: Evil Dead II
- Gender: Male
- Race/Nationality: Caucasian American
- Height: 5 ft ? in (152–180 cm)
- Hair: Brown
- Eyes: Green
- Age: 35
- Family: Bobby Joe (girlfriend)
- Location: Dearborn, Michigan
- Status: Deceased
- Portrayed by: Dan Hicks (Evil Dead II)

Jake is Bobby Joe's boyfriend and an incredibly stereotypical Southerner. He is first seen when Annie and Ed ask for help to the cabin, setting up a roadblock sign in front of the destroyed bridge. Once at the cabin, Jake and the others throw a confused Ash into the cellar after he mistakenly attacks them only to get him out when they learn the truth. Later, after Bobby Joe runs from the cabin and disappears, Jake loses it and makes Ash and Annie leave the cabin with him to try searching for Bobby Joe, throwing the pages of the Necromonicon into the cellar. As they leave the cabin, Jake's concern for Bobby Joe leads him to frantically call for her at the top of his lungs when they see there is no trail, ignoring Ash's warnings and even physically attacking him while the latter reprimands him, and then attacking Annie while she attempts to defend Ash. His ignorance soon proves to be his undoing, as Ash is possessed by the Evil and throws Jake headfirst into a tree. Jake manages to escape Ash long enough to seek help from Annie within the cabin. Unfortunately, the confused and frightened Annie stabs him in the chest with the Kandarian Dagger, and in her rush to get away from the possessed Ash, slams the door on Jake's body several times before pulling him inside. Jake is then dragged screaming down the hall by Annie and left a bit too close to the cellar door, he lies defenseless and is eaten alive to the bone by Henrietta. His bloody skeleton, covered in tattered clothing, is later seen when Ash travels to the basement to find the pages; thinking that the sound of the boiler is a monster, Ash investigates and finds the pages, and Jake's fleshless remains fall on top of him from behind, freaking him out. He was played by Sam Raimi film regular Dan Hicks. His corpse was seen in the Ash vs. Evil Dead episode "The Dark One".

==== Bobby Joe ====
Bobby Joe
- Bobby Joe
- Appears in: Evil Dead II
- Gender: Female
- Race/Nationality: Caucasian American
- Height: 5 ft 10 in (178 cm)
- Hair: Blonde
- Eyes: Grey
- Age: 24
- Family: Jake (boyfriend)
- Location: Dearborn, Michigan
- Status: Deceased
- Portrayed by: Kassie Wesley DePaiva (Evil Dead II)

Bobby Joe is Jake's girlfriend. She meets up with Annie and company while they're attempting to find a way to the cabin. Along with Jake, she helps Annie and co. get to the cabin via a back trail. Once at the cabin she is mistakenly shot at through the cabin's door by a frightened Ash. After recovering, she spends most of the time complaining and screaming until being frightened by Ash's possessed severed hand and running outside the cabin. Once outside, she is grabbed by vines and dragged at incredible speed though the woods to be eaten by a large demonic tree. On a side note she was supposed to be ripped in half by the tree but the filmmakers took it out because it would be too graphic, although the first film showed Shelly being bloodily dismembered by Scotty with an axe and her hacked-off parts convulsing on the floor. She was played by Kassie Wesley.

==== Ed Getley ====
Ed Getley
- Ed Getley
- Appears in: Evil Dead II
- Gender: Male
- Race/Nationality: Caucasian American
- Height: 5 ft ? in (152–180 cm)
- Hair: Blond
- Eyes: Grey
- Age: ?
- Family: Annie Knowsby (girlfriend); Professor Knowsby (associate)
- Location: Dearborn, Michigan
- Status: Deceased
- Portrayed by: Rick Domeier (Evil Dead II)

Ed is Annie's coworker and apparent boyfriend, he travels with her to the cabin to proceed with their research of the book of the dead. Soon after they arrive at the cabin, Ed becomes possessed by the Evil and attacks Bobby Joe, ripping off a piece of her hair out with his teeth. Ed then throws an attacking Jake into a lightbulb as Annie looks on in shock. Ash kills Ed with a fatal hit from a newly acquired axe to the head. There were a bunch of scenes where he got up with the axe in the head, where he was still trying to kill everyone even with his head half off (in part due to Annie's refusal to help Ash dismember his corpse), but it was cut. He was portrayed by Richard Domeier.

==== Professor Raymond Knowby ====
Professor Knowby is Annie's father and Henrietta's husband. He traveled to the cabin to finish his research on the Necronomicon. However, things turn out very badly when he recites a passage from the book releasing the Evil surrounding the woods. He is attacked by his wife and is forced to kill her yet, unable to bring himself to dismember her body, chose to bury her in the cellar. Before succumbing to the Evil himself, he manages to leave a tape explaining the terror he has unleashed and later shows up as a spirit explaining to Annie how to get rid of it. In the alternate timeline Baal tricks Ash and his friends to heading to, one where Ash and his original friends never came to the cabin in the woods, Raymond Knowby doesn't try killing his wife and instead chained her in the basement. Instead of trying to put her down, he instead tries transferring the Deadite spirit in Henrietta to another host. After enlisting the help of one of his students, a girl named Tanya, to come back with him to help study the Necronomicon he intends to trap Tanya in the cellar with the possessed Henrietta to somehow use the girl as the new host for the demon controlling his wife. When Ash and his friends arrive, they end up disrupting the plan; forcing Professor Knowby to flee, only for him to be killed by the Ruby of that timeline who takes the book for herself. In The Evil Dead, his voice was performed by Bob Dorian and was personified by John Peaks in Evil Dead II and Nicholas Hope in Ash vs. Evil Dead.

==== Henrietta Knowby ====
Henrietta is Professor Knowby's wife and Annie's mother. She travels to the cabin with Professor Knowby to research the book of the dead. Henrietta is possessed soon after the Professor reads from the book and attempts to kill her husband. She is soon killed by her own husband, who didn't have the heart to dismember her corpse (the only way to definitely kill a deadite) and is buried in the cellar. Non-possessed Henrietta appears once in the film feebly beckoning to Annie to open the cellar door and let her out. Annie almost falls for it, but is convinced otherwise by Ash. Locked in the cellar for most of the film she taunts the captives and tries unsuccessfully to get them to open the cellar door. She attacks Ash when he is thrown in the cellar after mistakenly attacking Annie and company. Later Henrietta is able to eviscerate an injured Jake who is dragged a bit too close to the cellar door by Annie. Finally Ash and Annie open the cellar and prepare to kill her once and for all. After a fierce battle in which Henrietta gruesomely transforms into an even more disgusting looking creature, she is decapitated, shot through the head, and killed by Ash with help from Annie singing a lullaby to distract her. She is played by Lou Hancock in her normal form and Ted Raimi in her possessed form.

=== Supporting roles from Army of Darkness ===
==== Arthur ====
Arthur is the ruler of a small kingdom who is at war with Henry the Red and his men. After Ash arrives to the past, Arthur mistakes him for one of Henry's men and later throws him into a pit with deadites inside it. After Ash defeats the deadites and escapes, he defeats Arthur and forces him to help him return to his time. Arthur and his men fight alongside Ash against Evil Ash's army of Deadites, in which Henry the Red joins forces with Arthur to fight them. After Evil Ash and his army are defeated, Arthur and Henry become friends, ending the war between them. In the original draft of the script, he does not survive the final battle, and is given a funeral before Ash attempts to return to his own time. Arthur was portrayed by Marcus Gilbert

His name may be a reference to King Arthur.

==== Henry the Red ====
Henry the Red is Arthur's foe and at war with him. Captured at the beginning of the film, Ash sets him and his surviving men free after escaping the deadite pit. Later on (during a deleted scene of the film), Ash meets with him to talk him into helping fight against the deadites and save Arthur's kingdom, something he isn't wild about. The results of this discussion are revealed later as Henry's men flank the deadites, causing their ranks to break and flee (in certain cuts of the film, this is never shown but for a brief mention; instead it's implied the destruction of Evil Ash is what causes the deadites to run away).

After the battle Arthur and Henry's men face off against each other, but instead of fighting embrace as friends, putting an end to the long war between the two men.

==== Sheila ====
Sheila was a peasant in Arthur's kingdom whom Ash romances. Her brother was killed in a battle with Henry the Red, she attacks Ash (who was at the time assumed to be one of Henry's men) and results in him falling into the pit to face the trapped deadite. However, Ash survives, and she warms up to him (much to Ash's annoyance at first, though they tend to reconcile rather quickly and spend the night together). She's the film's main love interest.

She was kidnapped by a flying deadite after Ash recovered the Necronomicon improperly, and corrupted by Evil Ash. During the main battle with the deadites, she stands in the path of the Deathcoaster, causing Ash to quickly veer to avoid her and crash (moments later she tries to kill him in her deadite form, and is pitched over a wall to the grown below). After Evil Ash was defeated, she returned to normal. Sheila was portrayed by Embeth Davidtz

In the original draft of the script, Ash saves her life early on, and they become close much faster than the final cut of the film. However she does not survive the final battle.

==== Blacksmith ====
The Blacksmith has no given name in the film, but appears in several key scenes, notably assisting Ash in the creation of both his prosthetic metal hand and the Deathcoaster. He takes a liking to him during the deadite pit fight, is saved from the deadite witch by Ash after a failed attempt to take said witch down, and is the first to voice support in fighting against the deadite horde instead of fleeing. He was portrayed by Timothy Patrick Quill, a long time friend of Sam Raimi. In the video game Army Of Darkness: Defense, he is called Smithy.

==== Goldtooth ====
Goldtooth is one of Arthur's men, and notably the one whipping Ash and Henry the Red's men at the start of the film as they're dragged to the castle. Ash makes note to single him out once he recovers his shotgun to threaten. He later reappears for the battle against the deadites.

Notably his name is never mentioned in the actual film, only the script and credits (his name being derived from the gold tooth in his mouth). In the original draft of the script he rode the Deathcoaster with Ash, only to be pulled into the deadite horde and himself resurface as one of the undead. The 2006 comic book Tales of Army of Darkness gives Goldtooth's real name as Kay'lor.

==== Wiseman ====
The Wiseman is a priest who is initially the only one who truly believes Ash is the prophesied "Hero from the Sky", the man who would (supposedly) permanently destroy the Evil Dead. He keeps a hold of Ash's weapons when the latter is thrown into the pit (in part due to Sheila hitting him in the head with a thrown rock), and throws Ash his chainsaw while fighting one of the trapped deadites, allowing him to decapitate and kill the creature. He then later tells Ash about the importance of keeping the Necronomicon away from the deadites, and tells him the incantation to properly retrieve the book (klatu verata nicto), although Ash eventually forgets them and attempts to trick the book by mumbling, releasing the Army of the Dead. He is last seen when he makes the magic potion to allow Ash to travel back home. He is portrayed by Ian Abercrombie.

In the script for Army of Darkness, he is called Wise Man John.

=== Supporting roles from Evil Dead (2013) ===
==== David Allen ====
David Allen is the brother of Mia in the film. His girlfriend, Natalie, along with two other friends, Eric and Olivia, died in Evil Dead. However, he's the only one of his friends who didn't get possessed by the demon.

=== Other ===
==== The Evil Force ====
Also known as The Kandarian Demon the Evil Force is a mist-like concentration of pure evil, implied to be multiple entities, released into the living when Professor Knowby recited passages from the Necronomicon. Its nature is hinted at in Ash Vs. Evil Dead as originating from the underworld along its ability to create deadites by possessing living beings or reanimate corpses. While possession-based deadites display some degree of superhuman strength and levitate, unable to maintain in sunlight, the deadites created from reanimated corpses display other abilities such as Henrietta's ability to fly and transform into a snake-headed creature, referred to by the cast and crew of Evil Dead II as "Mr. Pee-Wee Head". Due to the nature of the Evil, it can only be harmed by relics like the Kandarian Dagger.

In The Evil Dead and Evil Dead II, the Evil is released by Ash and his friends with only Ash the survivor as he and Annie use the Necronomicon to give its entirety a corporeal form, thus creating the "Rotten Apple Head", a large demonic tree-like creature with the faces of its victims on the side, before Ash sends it to the Netherworld. In Army of Darkness, the Evil acts through Evil Ash in raising an army of the dead in the movie's climax. In Ash vs. Evil Dead, the Evil Force resumes its attack on Ash after he accidentally released it, with Ruby Knowby - one of the creators of the Necronomicon - attempting to control it to maintain order.
