= Ash vs Evil Dead =

American comedy horror television series

- Genre: Action-adventure; Black comedy; Comedy horror; Dark fantasy
- Based on: Characters by Sam Raimi
- Developed by: Sam Raimi; Ivan Raimi; Tom Spezialy
- Starring: Bruce Campbell; Ray Santiago; Dana DeLorenzo; Jill Marie Jones; Lucy Lawless; Michelle Hurd; Ted Raimi; Pepi Sonuga; Arielle Carver-O'Neill; Lindsay Farris
- Music by: Joseph LoDuca
- Country of origin: United States
- Original language: English
- No. of seasons: 3
- No. of episodes: 30

Production
- Executive producers: Rob Tapert; Sam Raimi; Bruce Campbell; Craig DiGregorio; Rob Wright; Ivan Raimi
- Producers: Chloe Smith; Aaron Lam; Rick Jacobson; Sean Clements; Dominic Dierkes
- Production locations: Auckland, New Zealand
- Cinematography: Dave Garbett; John Cavill; Andrew McGeorge; Kevin Riley
- Editors: Bryan Shaw; Tom Eagles; Allanah Bazzard; Gary Hunt; Jochen FitzHerbert; Bob Murawski
- Camera setup: Single-camera
- Running time: 25–37 minutes; 41 minutes (pilot)
- Production companies: Renaissance Pictures; Starz Originals

Original release
- Network: Starz
- Release: October 31, 2015 – April 29, 2018

Related
- The Evil Dead; Evil Dead II; Army of Darkness

Ash vs Evil Dead is an American comedy horror television series developed by Sam Raimi, Ivan Raimi, and Tom Spezialy for Starz. The series is a sequel to the original Evil Dead trilogy created by Raimi, with Bruce Campbell reprising his role as Ash Williams. Ray Santiago, Dana DeLorenzo, and Lucy Lawless also star.

The series premiered on October 31, 2015. Three days before the series premiere, Starz renewed it for a second season, which premiered on October 2, 2016. Starz renewed it for a third season, which premiered on February 25, 2018. The series was canceled after three seasons on April 29, 2018.

== Premise ==
The series is set approximately 30 years after Ash Williams returned from 1300 AD at the end of Army of Darkness (1992). He works at the "Value Stop" as a simple stock boy. Also working at the store is his friend Pablo and the object of Pablo's affections, Kelly. Ash has seemingly done very little with his life since his battles with the Deadites and lives in a trailer and drinks alone in bars. However, Ash must soon renounce his routine existence and become a hero once more by taking up arms and facing the titular Evil Dead. Pablo and Kelly decide to join him on his quest to save humanity.

== Cast ==
=== Main ===
- Bruce Campbell as Ash Williams: A survivor of several attacks by the Evil Dead three decades earlier. In an interview with Entertainment Weekly, Campbell stated, "Ash has survivor's guilt. You could have a heyday with his PTSD. He's a war vet. He doesn't want to talk about it, and he'll lie about that stump on his hand to impress the ladies. This is a guy who's got some issues. He's emotionally stunted. But, he's the guy you want in the foxhole next to you." Over the course of season one, it is revealed that following the events of the film trilogy, Ash spent thirty years drifting from town to town, living in a mobile home trailer, with his pet lizard, Eli, and working a series of dead-end jobs at different branches of Value Stop. Ash has attempted to destroy the Necronomicon on multiple occasions. Unable to be rid of the book, he instead becomes its de facto caretaker. In season two, it is revealed that Ash had returned to his hometown of Elk Grove, Michigan, after the events of the films. The people of Elk Grove refused to believe his stories of Deadites, and instead accused him of murdering his friends and his sister in the cabin, shunned him, and dubbed him "Ashy Slashy".
- Ray Santiago as Pablo Simon Bolivar: A co-worker who became Ash's loyal sidekick. Pablo believes that Ash is a true hero and calls him "El Jefe" ("The Boss") as a mark of respect. Santiago describes his character as an "El Jefe in-training". He was raised by his uncle, "el Brujo", a shaman, who told him stories of an evil power which can only be defeated by "El Jefe". He fights valiantly alongside Ash and Kelly before being torn to ribbons by the demon Baal, but was resurrected thereafter. Through a ritual in season 3, Pablo succeeds his uncle as a "brujo especial".
- Dana DeLorenzo as Kelly Maxwell / Sorceress Kaya: An occasionally moody and initially reluctant co-worker of Ash and Pablo, Kelly is dragged into the fight against evil after she is orphaned. She is often described as a spiritual daughter of Ash. Impulsive but really good at fighting and improvisation. She is a crucial member of the "Ghostbeaters". She and her family are Jewish. Her mother died in a car accident six months prior to the beginning of the series.
- Jill Marie Jones as Amanda Fisher (season 1): A Michigan State Trooper who set out to find Ash following the death of her partner.
- Lucy Lawless as Ruby Knowby / Rebecca Prevett: A mysterious figure who is on a quest to hunt down the source of the recent evil outbreaks.
- Michelle Hurd as Linda Bates-Emery (season 2): Ash's high school girlfriend who is now married to Emery, the sheriff of Elk Grove, and has a daughter, Lacey. She is one of the few people in Elk Grove happy to see Ash return.
- Ted Raimi as Chet Kaminski (season 2): A hard-partying old childhood friend of Ash's who was secretly intimate with Ash's sister, Cheryl, thirty years prior, and pays the ultimate price for it. Raimi had previously appeared throughout the Evil Dead series in various cameo and stand-in roles.
- Arielle Carver-O'Neill as Brandy Barr Williams (season 3): Ash's long-lost daughter, a smart middle-class American high school senior whose life is upended when she finds herself caught up in violent demonic events that result in her mother's death.
- Lindsay Farris as Dalton (season 3): A member of the Knights of Sumeria, an ancient order dedicated to battling evil.

=== Recurring ===
- Samara Weaving as Heather (season 1): The sole survivor of a hiking group, she is rescued by Pablo and Kelly when they reach the cabin. She is later indirectly killed by Ruby when the evil is set loose.
- Indiana Evans as Melissa (season 1): A member of the hiking group, Brad's wife, and Heather's friend. She is killed by Deadite Amanda.
- Ido Drent as Brad (season 1): Melissa's husband who is killed by Deadite Amanda while his hiking group tries to help Pablo and Kelly find the cabin.
- Hemky Madera as El Brujo (season 1, 3): Pablo's shaman uncle, Ash, Pablo and Kelly go to him for help against the Kandarian Demon. He is killed by the demon Eligos when he performs an exorcism on Kelly to release her from Eligos' thrall.
- Lee Majors as Brock Williams (season 2–3): Ash's father, whom Ash has not seen in 30 or so years, since the events of The Evil Dead. It is from his father that Ash got his bad habits (debauchery, etc.), and it's hinted that he has stolen girls/women from Ash in the past (i.e. his son's old high school P.E. teacher, Lillian Pendergrast). His day job is as a hardware store owner; his slogan is "Brock Williams – has wood – call me." He blames Ash for the death of his daughter, Cheryl, but then, minutes before being killed by his son's possessed Oldsmobile 88, comes to realize that his boy was actually a hero. He later appears as a spirit to help guide Ash on how to defeat the Deadites.
- Stephen Lovatt as Sheriff Thomas Emery (season 2): The husband of Linda whom Ash used to pick on in high school. He is now the strict sheriff of Elk Grove.
- Joel Tobeck as Baal (season 2): A diabolical demon and Ruby's ex-husband who wants the Necronomicon for his own nefarious purposes. His abilities include using lust to manipulate others, possessing human bodies and the ability to slow down time near a target (or just their perception of it) where–in he can converse with or injure said target. When Baal is using this power, nobody seems to be able to see him besides the person he is interacting with. Ruby has also mentioned that he is impervious to physical attacks and can only be harmed through mystic or spiritual means. Ruby also disclosed that she didn't "choose" him when they became a couple, but had used his powers on her. It isn't clear if he is meant as a nod to the Biblical Baal or the Canaanite Baal.
- Pepi Sonuga as Lacey Emery (season 2): Thomas' and Linda's 17-year-old daughter who becomes possessed by Kandarian spirits and is killed by Kelly.
- Emilia Burns as Zoë (season 3): a Knight of Sumeria who helps Ash in his crusade.
- Katrina Hobbs as Candace "Candy" Barr-Williams (season 3): An ex-girlfriend of Ash's who is the mother of their daughter Brandy. Ash married Candace in Branson, Missouri when they were drunk, and she never sought a divorce/annulment, leaving them legally married. She was later killed by a deadite before becoming one herself at her own funeral.
- Samantha Young as Natalie (season 3): A woman who Ruby kidnaps and holds hostage to be a sort-of babysitter for her spawn. She is later killed by the demonic baby.

=== Special guests ===
- Rebekkah Farrell as Linda (season 1)
- Ellen Sandweiss returning as Cheryl Williams (season 2) from the original Evil Dead movie.
- Nicholas Hope as Professor Raymond Knowby (season 2)
- Alison Quigan (normal form) and Ted Raimi (Deadite form) as Henrietta Knowby (season 2)
- Kelvin Taylor as an Orderly
- Jeffrey Thomas as Stanley Gibson (season 3)

== Production ==
The series first started life as two competing ideas for a fourth Evil Dead film. However at the time the Raimi brothers did not know how to get funding for the film and so it was instead written as a TV show. Writing for the medium presented new challenges for Sam as he had to make the series accessible to new viewers as well as create new characters to "bounce off of". The project was first officially revealed by Raimi at a surprise appearance at the 2014 San Diego Comic-Con. That November, Starz announced that they officially put an order in for the series. Campbell said the channel was the only network that would give them the ability to be unrated and unrestricted; Campbell has stated that Starz does not require the crew to create alternate, "wimpy" versions for television.

The pilot episode of the series was written by Sam Raimi (who also directed), Ivan Raimi and Tom Spezialy. In February 2015, original film series producer Robert Tapert returned to produce along with Raimi, Campbell and Craig DiGregorio. Ray Santiago and Dana DeLorenzo were cast in the lead roles of Pablo Simon Bolivar and Kelly Maxwell, and Jill Marie Jones was cast as Amanda Fisher, a Michigan State Trooper. In March 2015, Lucy Lawless was cast as Ruby, a mysterious figure who's on a quest to stop the evil outbreak and believes that Ash is the one who's the cause of it. In April 2015, Starz released a new graphic teaser advertising the TV show is coming in the fall of 2015, along with a new poster for the series. Filming commenced in Auckland, New Zealand later that month.

Due to legal issues with Universal Pictures, the events from Army of Darkness could not specifically be mentioned in the first season. In April 2015, the producers made it clear that they wanted to resolve the issue, and in mid-2016, producer Robert Tapert stated that the rights issue had been solved and that references to Army of Darkness would appear from season two onward.

== Marketing ==
During the 2016 election of United States, Starz made a fictional web campaign on Youtube to promote the second season of the show called "Ash For President", where Ash promised to transform the White House into a party house and campaign subscribers received gifts related to the character.

== Online hoax ==
In June 2016, a Facebook user posted a photo of a bruised, bloodied, and scratched Samara Weaving (without identifying that the woman in the image was Weaving or any actress). The photo was accompanied by the caption "The result of Fascism in America...simply because she was a Trump supporter." Although some news outlets clarified that the photo was of Samara Weaving and that she was not really injured, many supporters of then-candidate Donald Trump were convinced that the image was proof of liberal violence against Trump supporters. In support of this misinterpretation of the photo, the post was shared close to 30,000 times. To try to counter this misinformation, Ash vs Evil Dead star Bruce Campbell tweeted, "Check your facts, folks. This is an actress named Samara Weaving from #AshVsEvilDead. This is a make-up test. Sad." Weaving herself tweeted, "I really hate this."

== Cancellation ==
It was announced on April 20, 2018, that Ash vs Evil Dead had been canceled after a three-season run, with the last episode airing on April 29, 2018. Towards the end of the third season, ratings had declined from the initial 437,000 same-day viewers of the first season to around 175,000 non-DVR viewers. According to Variety, at the time of the eighth episode of the third season's airing, the show averaged a 0.08 rating in adults aged 18 to 49, with approximately 177,000 viewers per episode.

Bruce Campbell stated at the time of the cancellation that "Ash vs. Evil Dead has been the ride of a lifetime. Ash Williams was the role of a lifetime. It was an honor to reunite with Evil Dead partners Rob Tapert and Sam Raimi to give our tireless fans another taste of the outrageous horror/comedy they demanded. I will always be grateful to Starz for the opportunity to revisit the franchise that launched our careers". Following the news of the show's cancellation, fans of the series created petitions to renew Ash vs Evil Dead for a fourth or fifth season. In response to an article published by the website Bloody Disgusting that encouraged fans to campaign for the show's continuation on the Netflix platform, Campbell tweeted "Big props to fans for the effort, but I'm retired as Ash. #timetofrysomeotherfish".

Later, Campbell said about the show's cancellation and legacy: "I'm really glad we did it because we saw Ash's home, we went into his bedroom, we met his girlfriends, we met his daughter that we never knew he had and that he never knew he had, and we met his father, played by the great Lee Majors. I feel we really pushed all the buttons and he fulfilled his destiny written in that ancient book. He was the guy destined to defeat evil in the past, present and future, and he took off with a hot robot chick at the end to go kick in the future. What else do you need? We knew the ratings were bad. We knew, going into the last season, that we had to have an end because we didn't think Starz was gonna re-up us and we were right. So, thank God we did that."

Campbell and Raimi signed on as producers of the film Evil Dead Rise, though Campbell did not star in the film. The cinematographer of Ash vs Evil Dead, Dave Garbett, served as cinematographer on Evil Dead Rise.

=== Cancelled revival ===
On July 25, 2022, Campbell announced that an animated revival of Ash vs Evil Dead was in active development, with Campbell returning as the voice of Ash. On July 26, 2024, Campbell confirmed the series was still in the works and suggested he was still set to voice Ash; however, three months later on October 29, 2024, he revealed the series was no longer intended as a continuation of Ash vs Evil Dead. On August 15, 2026, Campbell confirmed that the animated revival was no longer happening as he is officially retired as Ash in both live action and animation.

== Episodes ==
Season	Episodes	Originally released	
Season	Episodes	First released	Last released
1	10	October 31, 2015	January 2, 2016
2	10	October 2, 2016	December 11, 2016
3	10	February 25, 2018	April 29, 2018

=== Season 1 (2015–16) ===
No. overall	No. in season	Title	Directed by	Written by	Original release date	US viewers (millions)
1	1	"El Jefe"	Sam Raimi	Sam Raimi & Ivan Raimi and Tom Spezialy	October 31, 2015	0.437
Thirty years after his epic battle against the evil Deadites, Ash Williams is living in a trailer park, working in a Value Stop department store, and spending his evenings womanizing in dive bars. After seeing a demonic visage appear on a woman's face, Ash recalls having a recent marijuana-addled "poetry read" with a young prostitute, from the Necronomicon, which he still keeps locked in a trunk. Elsewhere in town, Michigan state police detective Amanda Fisher investigates a disturbance at an abandoned house and encounters Ash's demon-possessed friend who kills her partner. After defeating the possessed woman, she is then forced to put down her undead partner who attacks her. Later, Amanda meets the mysterious Ruby Knowby who seems too understanding about the horrors Amanda has witnessed. As more evil happenings occur around him, Ash realizes he unwittingly reawakened the horrible curse again and decides to slip out of town, but he is stopped by his co-workers, Pablo and Kelly, who realize he is to blame for what is going on. After having to kill his possessed neighbor, Ash reluctantly decides to resume his old chainsaw-wielding persona once again.
2	2	"Bait"	M. J. Bassett (Note: Credited as Michael Bassett.)	Dominic Dierkes	November 7, 2015	0.276
Pablo and Ash help Kelly who is worried about a strange call from her father (Phil Peloton) and the sudden return of her lost mother (Mimi Rogers), who was feared dead months ago. Ash remains suspicious of the mother, believing she is a Deadite impostor. Meanwhile, Amanda follows leads that Ash is behind the recent deaths and strange happenings around town, and decides to track him down. Ash and Pablo arrive at Kelly's father's house to find Kelly's mother acting normal. However, after being provoked at the dinner table by Ash, Kelly's mother reveals herself as a Deadite and kills Kelly's father with a fork. After a madcap fight between her and Ash, the Deadite tries to convince Kelly that she is fine now, but shows herself again and Ash kills her. After burying the two bodies, Kelly agrees to accompany Ash and Pablo, and the three drive away.
3	3	"Books from Beyond"	M. J. Bassett	Sean Clements	November 14, 2015	0.383
With the mysterious Ruby one step behind them, Ash and his friends seek out Lionel Hawkins (Kelson Henderson), the owner of the occult bookstore "Books from Beyond", to find a way to undo the evil curse. Lionel uses the Necronomicon to summon the demon Eligos (Ben Fransham) in hopes of compelling it to give the answers Ash seeks. The ceremony goes awry when Amanda arrives to arrest Ash and Eligos escapes the summoning circle. In all the chaos, Ash does manage to get a cryptic response that the solution to his predicament resides within him.
4	4	"Brujo"	David Frazee	James E. Eagan	November 21, 2015	0.448
After dealing with the demon, Ash leaves the uncooperative Amanda handcuffed in the bookstore and trapped with a Deadite Lionel. She is saved however by Ruby, and after learning of her interest in Ash, the two join forces in hunting him down. Meanwhile, Pablo takes Ash to meet his shaman uncle (Hemky Madera), a "Brujo", who may be able to help. Along the way, Kelly gets sick and acts strangely, having been unknowingly possessed by Eligos. Eventually the Brujo gives Ash a drug-induced vision of himself relaxing on a pier in Jacksonville, Florida (Ash's idealized vacation spot), where his pet lizard Eli appears and tells him he must bury the Necronomicon deep in the place where everything started – the cabin in the woods. During the trip, a possessed Kelly attacks Ash.
5	5	"The Host"	David Frazee	Zoë Green	November 28, 2015	0.430
The Eligos-possessed Kelly convinces Pablo and his uncle that Ash is the one possessed. Elsewhere, Amanda and Ruby close in on Ash by using Ash's severed undead hand to guide them. The Brujo prepares for an exorcism while, back in Ash's trailer, Kelly tries to seduce Pablo and later kill him. Once the demon reveals himself the Brujo performs the exorcism on Kelly, forcing Eligos to leave, but not before the Brujo is killed. During a funeral for the Brujo, Pablo takes his uncle's sacred Santa Muerte medallion. Back at the trailer, Pablo gives Ash a new mechanical hand that he had been working on.
6	6	"The Killer of Killers"	Michael Hurst	Nate Crocker	December 5, 2015	0.402
Ruby and Amanda arrive at the Brujo's ranch just having missed Ash, but the charred skeleton of the Brujo emerges from the funeral pyre and confronts Ruby telling her that she will never have the book for herself. The two fall into the pyre which then explodes. Amanda leaves in Ruby's car but notices Ash's hand has disappeared. On their way to the cabin, Ash, Pablo, and Kelly stop at a roadside diner to meet Lem (Peter Feeney), an old militia friend of Ash's, and ask for help in acquiring some weapons. While Ash tries to scam his way out of paying the diner check, Pablo and Kelly return to the trailer and deal with the Necronomicon which comes alive and reacts to the Brujo's Santa Muerte medallion. Meanwhile, Amanda confronts Ash and arrests him, just as her police chief arrives. Soon, however, the evil Kandarian force attacks the diner, spontaneously turning the police chief and a waitress into Deadites. Having barely escaped the horror, Lem calls his militia buddies to "arm up" but he is soon attacked by the force himself. Back at the smoldering diner, Amanda agrees to join up with Ash's group.
7	7	"Fire in the Hole"	Michael Hurst	Sean Clements, Dominic Dierkes and Ivan Raimi	December 12, 2015	0.452
Ash and his group go to meet the militiamen but find they have been attacked by a demon-possessed Lem. Lem attacks again, and Ash and Amanda become trapped in the militia's bunker with him. Meanwhile, Kelly and Pablo escape to the woods but the militiamen, thinking the two are government agents and their friend Lem is infected with a government virus, hunt them down. Back at the Brujo's ranch, Ruby emerges from the funeral pyre unharmed; she goes to the diner and resumes her search for Ash. Eventually, Pablo and Kelly rescue Ash and Amanda and get the weapons from the militia. Ash unexpectedly vanishes, and his severed hand is seen crawling through the woods toward the cabin.
8	8	"Ashes to Ashes"	Tony Tilse	M. J. Bassett	December 19, 2015	0.465
Armed with his chainsaw, shotgun and the Necronomicon, Ash returns to the sinister cabin after 30 years. He finds Amanda behind him who convinces him that he should not face the evil alone. Meanwhile, Kelly and Pablo are lost in the woods but find a group of Australian hikers consisting of Brad (Ido Drent), Melissa (Indiana Evans), and their friend Heather (Samara Weaving), who lead them toward the cabin. At the cabin, Ash is taunted by the severed head of his old girlfriend Linda that he left in the work shed three decades ago. In the cabin, Amanda listens to the old tape recorder about the Necronomicon. Ash suddenly appears and tells her that they should just leave and be together, but Amanda notices his putrid hand and he attacks her. She manages to cut off and destroy the hand, but imposter-Ash impales her on the antlers of the deer head in the living room. The real Ash then finds Amanda just before she dies. Pablo and Kelly return and Ash tells them that she was killed by another Evil Ash that is running around somewhere.
9	9	"Bound in Flesh"	Tony Tilse	Rob Wright	December 26, 2015	0.343
Pablo and Kelly confront the two Ashes and, once they realize who the impostor is, they kill him. Ash decides to chop up the bodies of the impostor and Amanda before they turn into Deadites, but the hikers return. Pablo and Kelly lead them away while Ash dismembers his clone. Suddenly the Necronomicon starts talking to him, trying to convince him not to bury it. He throws the book in the refrigerator then notices Amanda has disappeared. Amanda, now a Deadite, attacks Pablo, Kelly and the hikers. She kills Brad and Melissa and Heather breaks her leg. Ruby arrives and Amanda runs off. Returning to the cabin, Ruby confronts Ash, introducing herself as the one who has been cleaning up his mess. She explains that the book cannot be simply buried but needs to be dismantled. Ash agrees to destroy the book and cuts off its face, but once he hands it over Ruby begins a ritual to unleash the evil upon the entire world. Ruby claims to have written the Necronomicon and the face of the book animates and attaches itself to Pablo.
10	10	"The Dark One"	Rick Jacobson	Craig DiGregorio	January 2, 2016	0.508
Before Ash can react to what is going on, Amanda returns and attacks him. He manages to defeat her but notices Ruby and Pablo have disappeared into the cellar. He goes down to find them but the Kandarian force pounds the cabin and Ash falls down the steps. He suddenly finds himself back in his trailer with the Necronomicon. Ruby appears and tells him that he was destined to stand against her, and then tries to broker a truce by offering him what he desires the most – a peaceful retirement in Jacksonville. Refusing the offer, Ash finds himself back in the cellar and under attack by a demonic child that was belched up by Pablo who is under the control of the Necronomicon. Meanwhile, Kelly and Heather attempt to survive a demonic onslaught. Heather is killed while Kelly is locked out of the cabin. Ash again confronts Ruby, who promises to leave Ash and his friends alone in exchange for allowing her to release evil spirits (which she claims she can control) from the Necronomicon. Ash accepts the deal and starts driving to Jacksonville with Kelly and Pablo, while sinkholes begin to open up around the world.

=== Season 2 (2016) ===
No. overall	No. in season	Title	Directed by	Written by	Original release date	US viewers (millions)
11	1	"Home"	Rick Jacobson	Craig DiGregorio	September 27, 2016 (online); October 2, 2016 (broadcast)	0.436
While enjoying his time at Jacksonville, Ash is forced to come out of retirement after being attacked by Deadites summoned by Ruby. Ash (still in possession of the Kandarian Dagger), Pablo and Kelly return to Ash's hometown in Elk Grove, Michigan, where they meet up with his father, Brock (Lee Majors), who criticizes him for running away from the town after the events that transpired 30 years ago. While searching around town for Ruby, Ash encounters his former love, Linda Bates, who is married to the town's sheriff, Thomas Emery. Emery mocks Ash, and promises to take him in when he can. Pablo receives a vision, prompting the gang to head to the town's crematorium, where Ash finds an injured Ruby, claiming that her children have betrayed her, forcing her to hide the Necronomicon. After saving her from her three demon children, Ash and Ruby form a temporary alliance.
12	2	"The Morgue"	Tony Tilse	Cameron Welsh	October 9, 2016	0.333
Ruby reveals to the group that she hid the Necronomicon inside a corpse at the town morgue, which prompts Ash and Kelly to go retrieve it, while Pablo stays with her at Brock's house in order to find out about his visions. While attempting to get the book, Ash discovers that his old high school P.E. teacher, who is dating Brock, turns out to have been dead and is now a Deadite. Ash returns home just in time to stop the Deadite from raising hell. Meanwhile, Pablo's grasp on reality is tested when Ruby reveals that the Necronomicon has gifted him with premonitions, a detail seen in one from which Ruby deduces that her ex-husband, Baal, is the reason behind why all of her children have turned on her. At the end, Ash's car, the Delta, is stolen by two teenagers, while still carrying the Necronomicon in it.
13	3	"Last Call"	Tony Tilse	Noelle Valdivia	October 16, 2016	0.321
In an attempt to lure the teenagers who stole his car to his place, Ash and his best buddy, Chet, devise a plan to throw a party at the bar, lure the thieves in, and get the Delta and the Necronomicon back. The plan backfires, however, as one of the teenagers' friends accidentally reads from the Necronomicon, allowing evil to possess her as well as the Delta, leading to a mass killing spree. The possessed teenager, Amber, heads to Ash's party, where she almost kills Brock before Ash intervenes. Brock realizes the truth about his son and shows his pride, but before he could reveal a secret to Ash, he is run over by the Delta. Meanwhile, Ruby attempts to convince Kelly that she is the one Ruby was supposed to be looking for.
14	4	"DUI"	M. J. Bassett	Ivan Raimi	October 23, 2016	0.274
The possessed Delta continues its rampage holding one of the teenagers, Lacey, hostage. It comes back and kidnaps Pablo as well. Ash takes Chet in tow, driving his car and pursues the Delta. Meanwhile, Ruby and Kelly head back to Ash's trailer to pick up weapons, where Ruby reveals that Baal can get into an individual's mind and manipulate them, and that she has been manipulated before. While they go back to the crematorium and kill the rest of her spawn, Ash continues chasing down Pablo, and Chet drops him off at an abandoned Demolition derby park. The Delta lets go of Pablo and Lacey, facing Ash by itself. While Pablo tries to deface the book, it tells him to read a passage. Ash stops the Delta, and they throw the book into the trunk of the car, a portal to hell, seemingly destroying it. Ruby, sensing the book's disappearance, runs back along with Kelly. A demon jumps out of the trunk at the end.
15	5	"Confinement"	M. J. Bassett	William Bromell	October 30, 2016	0.274
Baal arrives on Earth and seduces a police officer before killing her and removing her skin. Ash is arrested for Amber's murder but is freed from his cell by Baal, disguised as the police officer. Pablo, Kelly and Ruby arrive at the police station to free Ash, while Lacey and Linda come looking for Sheriff Emery. Before going to look for the Kandarian Dagger, Ruby warns the group of Baal's ability to disguise himself by wearing peoples' skin, which sets the group on edge as they come to realise that any one of them could be Baal. Pablo reveals a strange rash to Ash and Kelly. Seeing Pablo's condition worsen, Emery believes that he is Baal, leading him to pull out his gun and threaten the group. Ruby returns with Ash's weapons and Ash defeats the reanimated flesh of a fallen police officer. On examining Pablo's rash, Ruby declares that he might be their only chance to stop Baal.
16	6	"Trapped Inside"	Mark Beesley	James E. Eagan	November 6, 2016	0.330
Ash, Kelly, Ruby, Linda and Lacey take Pablo back to Ash's house, where Ruby reveals that if they wait long enough, the required spell to send Baal back to hell will emerge on Pablo's skin. Baal uses his powers to convince Emery to lead a mob of Elk Grove townspeople to capture Ash. As the townspeople surround Ash's house, Ash hears a noise coming from Cheryl's room. Inside he sees Chet, who had come to warn him about the mob. The required spell emerges from Pablo's skin, while Ruby reveals to Kelly that birthing her demon "children" cost her her immortality. A Deadite Cheryl appears and fights Ash, killing Chet in the process. The fight is taken outside, where the townspeople are surprised to see Cheryl, seemingly alive. Ash kills her and reveals her to be a Deadite, thus convincing the people that he is not a murderer. Ash is then knocked out by Baal.
17	7	"Delusion"	Mark Beesley	Hank Chilton	November 13, 2016	0.337
Ash wakes up from a nightmare only to find himself in an asylum, where a man calling himself Doctor Peacock claims that Ash has been locked up since the murder of his friends at the cabin, and that everything about the Necronomicon was a delusion he made up to deny responsibility for his actions. Ash realizes that Peacock is none other than Baal, who is trying to break his mind through an illusion. Within the illusion he sees Ruby as a nurse, Kelly as a fellow inmate, and Pablo as an orderly. Ash attempts to fight through the illusions, but fails time after time. After meeting with Linda and seeing Ruby, Pablo and Kelly arrive outside the asylum, Ash then seemingly agrees to follow Baal's command to destroy the Necronomicon.
18	8	"Ashy Slashy"	Tony Tilse	Suzanne Keilly and Aaron Lam	November 20, 2016	0.237
Ruby, Pablo and Kelly enter the asylum and encounter Sheriff Emery, who got Linda to help him capture Ash in exchange for Lacey's freedom from Baal. Lacey, however, turns up as a Deadite and murders Emery, and is later killed by Kelly. Ruby and Pablo encounter Ash, who then takes Pablo to Baal. Kelly later meets up with Linda, who learns about the deaths of both her husband and daughter. She then resolves to take down Baal for good. They reach Pablo, where Ash reveals that he was never broken by Baal, and it was all part of his plan to get Pablo and Baal in the same room. Pablo then recites the incantation to send Baal back to Hell, but before disappearing, Baal slashes Pablo in the stomach, cutting him in half.
19	9	"Home Again"	Rick Jacobson	Jennifer Ames & Steve Turner	December 4, 2016	0.266
Distraught over the loss of Pablo, Ash and the gang attempt to travel back in time to ensure that young Ash will never see the Necronomicon. They return to the year 1982, before young Ash went to the cabin. As they travel to the woods, the gang is chased down by the Kandarian Demon, even though no one had read from the book yet. Ruby and Kelly are separated from Ash in the escape, who runs into the cabin. After a brief altercation with an evil foetus that attempts to infect Ash from his leg, Ash hears a faint voice crying for help from the cellar. He finds the voice to be coming from Henrietta Knowby, who claims to have been trapped and tortured here by her husband. While initially not believing her, Ash eventually discovers as Professor Knowby returns with one of his students, Tanya, who he plans to use to transfer the Kandarian Demon from within Henrietta onto her. Ash then frees Henrietta, just as he realizes he's been tricked, allowing her to run amok. In the midst of the chaos, Professor Knowby escapes with the Necronomicon and locks Ash and Tanya down in the cellar with Henrietta. Meanwhile, Ruby and Kelly are attacked by possessed trees, as well as being followed by a mysterious being.
20	10	"Second Coming"	Rick Jacobson	Luke Kalteux	December 11, 2016	0.269
As Professor Knowby attempts to escape the cabin, he is killed by the Ruby of year 1982, who then retrieves the Necronomicon. Henrietta murders Tanya, and battles Ash, but is ultimately defeated. As Ash reunites with present-day Ruby and Kelly, past Ruby learns of their involvement and then kills present-day Ruby, while Ash and Kelly attempt to escape. The effects of the timeline alteration take place as Ash notices the return of his missing right hand, and Pablo seemingly returning to life. However, he turns out to be Baal, who has secretly taken over Pablo's corpse rather than being banished and reveals they are not actually in the direct past; but rather an alternate timeline where only Knowby found the book. Baal and the alternate Ruby take Ash and Kelly back to the cabin, where they begin to perform rituals to give birth to their spawns. Ash proposes a fair fight between him and Baal, without the use of any magic or weapon. Baal gains the upper hand by using his powers to change form into Chet, Cheryl and Brock, tricking Ash and removing his right hand once more. As Baal prepares to execute Ash, however, he is outwitted and defeated. As the cabin begins to burn down and crumble, Baal, Ruby, their spawns, and the Necronomicon are seemingly banished to the Neitherworld (Hell) as part of the deal, while Pablo is brought back to life. Ash and his friends returns to their timeline, where Elk Grove reveres him as a hero, while the alternate Ruby (somehow having escaped her timeline) watches him from afar. In a post-credit scene, the Necronomicon is picked up by an unknown traveler from the remains of the cabin.

=== Season 3 (2018) ===
No. overall	No. in season	Title	Directed by	Written by	Original release date	US viewers (millions)
21	1	"Family"	Mark Beesley	Mark Verheiden	February 25, 2018	0.225
After the Necronomicon is once again found and read, the Evil Dead makes a return to Elk Grove. Ash reunites with Candace Barr, a former lover with whom he had a daughter, Brandy. Ash, Pablo and Candace rush to Kenward County High School in search of Brandy, who is being hunted down by the Kandarian Demon. They find Brandy and her friend Rachel in the music classroom, but a possessed Rachel then attacks and manages to decapitate Candace. Ash kills Rachel and then battles the possessed school mascot, Cougie, but Kelly, along with Dalton, a Knight of Sumeria, arrive and save Ash. Ruby, after retrieving the Necronomicon, performs a ritual, smearing her blood over a drawing of Ash and drinking it, causing her to be impregnated.
22	2	"Booth Three"	Mark Beesley	Rob Fresco	March 4, 2018	0.171
While driving on the road, Ruby is forced to stop to give birth to her new demonic spawn, which she claims to be modeled after Ash's image. She kidnaps Natalie, a Norwegian woman and uses her partner's corpse as food to feed the spawn. Ash takes Brandy to school, where she meets up with Ruby, who is disguised as the school's guidance counselor, Ms. Prevett. Ruby attempts to persuade her in distrusting Ash. Pablo is visited by a female spirit who warns him of evil taking over his body, and that he must embrace his destiny as the next Brujo. Dalton notices the Sumerian writing on Pablo's body, and attempts to convince Kelly that he must be killed to prevent future risks. Ash later goes to the local sperm bank to investigate whether his sperm had been used, but Ruby summons the Kandarian Demon to the bank to destroy his seeds. Ash manages to prevail, but realizes that he must now protect Brandy at all cost.
23	3	"Apparently Dead"	Diego & Andres Meza-Valdes	Ivan Raimi	March 11, 2018	0.160
While Ash is attending Candace's funeral, she becomes possessed and fights him. Brandy's distrust for Ash grows further. Ash, upon discovering Ruby's involvement, informs the gang to find the Kandarian Dagger. Pablo receives another vision from the female spirit, pointing them toward the cabin. Pablo, Kelly and Dalton return to the cabin and start digging through the remains; eventually Kelly finds the knife, but the Evil Dead then comes after them and impales Dalton through a tree branch. He quickly turns Deadite and demands the knife, but Pablo attempts to run him over with a truck. Ruby goes to the cemetery and resurrects Brock Williams, who then returns to his home and meets Brandy. Later, Ash returns and has a fight with Brock, ending with the latter being killed right in front of Brandy.
24	4	"Unfinished Business"	Daniel Nettheim	Nicki Paluga	March 18, 2018	0.176
Ash is visited by the ghost of the real Brock, who shows him a vision of the past in 2012 when he was visited by a Knight of Sumeria, Gary, who carried the missing pages of the Necronomicon. Brock incapacitated the knight and locked him under the hardware store's cellar after thinking he was dead. Back in present day, Ash enters the cellar and finds the knight's skeleton, as well as Sumerian writing on the wall. Ruby is contacted by the sorceress Kaya, who is imprisoned in the Netherworld. Kaya warns Ruby of the inevitable prophecy and the opening of the Rift. Ruby travels to the Knowby Cabin and finds Dalton, who she temporarily revives in order to learn of what he knew. Dalton reveals to Ruby of their finding of the dagger, but then shoots himself in the head to prevent himself from turning once more. Kelly returns to Ash's home and finds Brandy, who she attempts to convince to stay. They are however attacked by Pablo, who has been possessed by the Kandarian Demon. In the ensuing struggle, Pablo bites Kelly in her leg and infects her. The two girls retreat to Ash's trailer and barricade themselves in, but Kelly's infection worsens and mutates further. Ash arrives at Ruby's hideout, where he finds Natalie with Ruby's spawn, which has grown considerably. Ash tries to break Natalie free, but ends up waking the spawn from its sleep.
25	5	"Baby Proof"	Daniel Nettheim	Luke Kalteaux	March 25, 2018	0.179
Pablo manages to enter the trailer, but Brandy stabs him with the Kandarian Dagger. He then finds himself in a realm between life and death, where he meets the Brujo, who explains that Pablo must now perform a ritual to return to life and succeed him. He successfully completes the ritual and comes back to life, but then runs off to find Ash. Kelly determines to make Ruby pay for what she's done. Meanwhile, at Ruby's hideout, Ash realizes that her spawn is made in his image, and attempts to capture him to prove his story to Brandy. The spawn goes on the loose, and kills Natalie. It attempts to manipulate her corpse to fight Ash but eventually Ash traps it inside. He then takes the spawn to the hardware store, but it manages to consume Natalie's corpse and free itself. He attempts to explain the situation to Brandy and a local police officer, but fails. However, Brandy chooses to believe her father and runs off together with him, leaving the spawn in Ruby's possession once more.
26	6	"Tales from the Rift"	Regan Hall	Aaron Lam	April 1, 2018	0.196
Ash is contacted by a group of Knights of Sumeria, who he then takes to his hardware store to investigate the Sumerian writing. They deduce that the knight who died in the cellar, Gary, had figured out a way to open the gateway to the Deadlands, a dimension between the human world and Neitherworld (Hell). Pablo arrives at the store and is able to decipher the text, opening the portal. One of the knights, Marcus, travels through the portal to scout ahead, but comes back a demon and slaughters the rest of the knights except one. Ash manages to take down the Demon Marcus, then instructs Pablo to find out how to close down the rift for good. Kelly goes to Ruby's hideout with the dagger, intending to kill her, but Ruby overpowers Kelly and kills her with the Kandarian Dagger. She then uses Kelly's body as a vessel for Kaya. Ash returns home later that night and receives the dagger from Kaya, who now poses as Kelly in order to sabotage Ash's plan.
27	7	"Twist and Shout"	Mark Beesley	Caitlin Meares	April 8, 2018	0.136
Back at the hardware store, Pablo sees the real Kelly in the Rift through an opening in the Sumerian writing and learns of her death. He rushes to find Ash to break the news. Ash and Kaya take Brandy to the school dance, in hope of confronting Ruby. Unbeknownst to them, Ruby also takes her spawn, now having fully grown into a clone of Ash, to the school in an attempt to break Brandy's trust in her father. Rash (Ruby's Ash) terrorizes the school and murders many students, fooling Brandy into believing that her father is a demon. When Ash finally gets to Brandy, Ruby provokes her by plunging herself into Ash's chainsaw and faking her death. However, Brandy can't bring herself to kill Ash. Pablo arrives at the school and encounters Kaya, but manages to escape. He and Rash fight momentarily, before the real Ash kills the clone. Ruby, frustrated at Ash's continuous streak of victory, wakes up and throws the Kandarian Dagger at him, but Brandy blocks the attack by jumping in front of him and dies instead. She then wakes up in the Deadlands, and runs away from a lurking threat.
28	8	"Rifting Apart"	Mark Beesley	Bryan Hill	April 15, 2018	0.175
Ash and Pablo hijack the coroner's van to steal Brandy's body and make it back to the hardware store, where they then use the Kandarian Dagger to kill Ash and send him through the Rift, in hope of rescuing Brandy and Kelly. At the Deadlands, Brandy finds Kelly and Dalton, who have been evading a shadow creature lurking the dimension and consuming any spirit it comes across. Ash arrives in the Deadlands with both of his hands intact, and finds the other three. They attempt to run for the hardware store, but with the shadow creature blocking their path, Dalton volunteers to sacrifice himself as a distraction. Back at the hardware store, Pablo struggles with one of the possessed corpses from the coroner's van, whom Ash accidentally retrieved instead of Brandy's corpse. Pablo manages to open the portal in time, but Kelly is unable to make it back due to her body still being used by Kaya. Meanwhile, Kaya captures the surviving knight, Zoe, who Ruby attempts to use in order to help both her and Kaya survive the forthcoming wrath of the Dark Ones.
29	9	"Judgement Day"	Rick Jacobson	Rick Jacobson	April 22, 2018	0.130
Ruby and Kaya use Zoe's body to make a new page for the Necronomicon, in order to hide their presence from the Dark Ones. Pablo discovers a connection between him and the Necronomicon, allowing him to see through its eyes. Ash determines to go back to their hideout and end Ruby's life. Pablo goes back to the hardware store only to find the Rift already open. The Dark Ones then come through and take the lost Necronomicon pages from Pablo, but spare his life. Back at Ash's house, Brandy fends off against the invading Kandarian Demon, but in the process, her phone is possessed and bites off her left thumb. Ash arrives at Ruby's place and attempts to fight them, but is quickly overpowered. Ruby destroys Ash's chainsaw and demands the location of the Rift, but the Dark Ones arrive and claim Ruby and Kaya's souls, allowing Ash to retreat with the Necronomicon and Kelly's body. Ash returns to town, only to find that the Evil Dead have terrorized it. The Dark Ones reclaim the Necronomicon and chant a spell that summons a sixty-feet-tall creature called Kandar the Destroyer.
30	10	"The Mettle of Man"	Rick Jacobson	Rick Jacobson	April 29, 2018	0.174
The Evil Dead begin to terrorize every part of the world, prompting military forces to take action. Ash, Brandy and Pablo take Kelly's body back to the hardware store, where Pablo travels through the Rift to find her while Ash and Brandy fend off the Deadites. They successfully revive Kelly, but military forces declare they are releasing a nuke to destroy Kandar, which Pablo insists will only make it stronger. Pablo, Kelly and Brandy evacuate with the military, but Ash decides to stay behind. He commandeers a tank, attaches the Kandarian Dagger onto a tank round, and attracts Kandar's attention long enough to be able to fire the round through it, killing it for good. In the aftermath, an injured Ash is recovered by the Knights of Sumeria. He wakes up in a postapocalyptic future, with a new augmented hand. Ash then meets Lexx, an augmented woman, and asks her about Brandy. Lexx promises to explain the situation to him while he drives her outside in a heavily modified Delta 88.

== Music ==
Joseph LoDuca, a frequent Sam Raimi collaborator who composed the scores for the Evil Dead films, contributes the original music for Ash vs Evil Dead. The series also leverages excerpts from various 1970s and '80s popular songs, particularly featuring artists (e.g., Alice Cooper, Ted Nugent and Frijid Pink) from the greater Detroit area where much of the action is based (and where Raimi, Campbell and Tapert grew up). Multiple Deep Purple songs from the 1970s are also used ("Highway Star", "Space Truckin'", "Stormbringer", etc.). In an interview, Sam Raimi states that the music selected for the series is based on the lack of growth of the Ash character over the past 30–35 years, and that "the music should reflect the last time he was engaged in society, and living".

Furthermore, in the season two finale, a marching band plays Victory for MSU, the official fight song of Michigan State University, where Raimi and Tapert attended college.

On November 11, 2015, it was announced that the Joseph LoDuca music score entitled Ash vs Evil Dead: Music from the STARZ Original Series would be released by Varèse Sarabande digitally on December 11, 2015, and via audio CD on December 18, 2015. The following are the tracks that are on that album:

Track listing
No.	Title	Length
1.	"Sheet Show / Main Title"	4:25
2.	"Ain't for Shabbas"	3:22
3.	"Linda / Where It Began"	2:20
4.	"Ash's Trip"	2:49
5.	"It Did Happen / Outta Here"	2:50
6.	"A Foul Wind Bloweth / Mom Returns"	2:47
7.	"Deer Amanda / Shut Up Linda"	3:50
8.	"The Handyman Can't"	0:46
9.	"Adios, Tio Brujo"	2:28
10.	"Soave Pablo / She Got Him"	2:34
11.	"Offer to Fisher / Handy Escape / She Was Ruby"	2:18
12.	"Let's Start Over / Pablo's Process"	2:06
13.	"Kill Me Now / Perp's Getting Away"	2:07
14.	"No Accident"	1:59
15.	"Evil Catches Up"	1:11
16.	"Missed Ya'"	1:38
17.	"Amanda Returns"	2:38
18.	"Ritual"	2:17
19.	"Not My Boyfriend / Burn the Cabin"	1:22
20.	"Burn Baby / Mortal Toys"	3:52
21.	"Without Evil There Is No Good"	2:37
22.	"Ash's Theme"	1:35
Total length:		53:51

== Reception ==
=== Critical response ===
All three seasons of Ash vs Evil Dead received critical acclaim. Review aggregator Rotten Tomatoes gave the season a 98% rating based on 52 reviews, with an average rating of 8.1/10. The site's critical consensus reads, "True to the movies that spawned it, Ash vs Evil Dead is a gory, hilarious, and audacious resurrection of Sam Raimi's beloved horror franchise." Metacritic gave the season a rating of 76 out of 100, based on 32 critics.

On Rotten Tomatoes, the second season has a score of 100%, based on 17 reviews, with an average rating of 8.06/10. The site's critical consensus reads, "Ash vs. Evil Dead's sophomore season proves the show is in command of its characters and tone, turning up the gore, fun, and energy to deliver even more grisly, action-packed thrills and laughs." On Metacritic, the season has a rating of 82 out of 100, based on five reviews.

The third season has a score of 100% based on 15 reviews on Rotten Tomatoes, with an average rating of 8.32/10. The site's critical consensus reads, "Ash vs Evil Dead's third and final season rounds out the amiable ensemble with welcome additions and dishes out a series of splatter-filled set-pieces, closing the Necronomicon on the series in gleeful fashion".

=== Accolades ===
Year	Association	Category	Nominee(s)	Result
2016	Fangoria Chainsaw Awards	Best Television Series	Ash vs Evil Dead	Won
2016	Fangoria Chainsaw Awards	Best Actor on Television	Bruce Campbell	Won
2016	Fangoria Chainsaw Awards	Best Supporting Actress on Television	Dana DeLorenzo	Nominated
2016	Saturn Awards	Best Horror Television Series	Ash vs Evil Dead	Nominated
2016	Saturn Awards	Best Actor on Television	Bruce Campbell	Won
2016	Rondo Hatton Classic Horror Awards	Best TV Presentation	Ash vs Evil Dead (Episode: "Brujo")	Won
2017	Fangoria Chainsaw Awards	Best TV Series	Ash vs Evil Dead	Nominated
2017	Fangoria Chainsaw Awards	Best TV Actor	Bruce Campbell	Won
2017	Fangoria Chainsaw Awards	Best TV Supporting Actor	Ray Santiago	Nominated
2017	Fangoria Chainsaw Awards	Best TV Supporting Actress	Dana DeLorenzo	Nominated
2017	Fangoria Chainsaw Awards	Best TV SFX	Roger Murray	Won
2017	Saturn Awards	Best Horror Television Series	Ash vs Evil Dead	Nominated
2017	Saturn Awards	Best Actor on a Television Series	Bruce Campbell	Nominated
2017	Saturn Awards	Best Supporting Actor on a Television Series	Lee Majors	Nominated
2018	Saturn Awards	Best Horror Television Series	Ash vs Evil Dead	Nominated
2018	Saturn Awards	Best Actor on a Television Series	Bruce Campbell	Nominated

== Home media ==
On August 23, 2016, Anchor Bay Entertainment, a division of Starz, released the first season of the series on Blu-ray and DVD. The second season was released in the fall of 2017. With season 2 onwards, the future releases were done by Lionsgate Home Entertainment after the completion of the Starz/Lionsgate merger on December 8, 2016. The third and final season was released in August 2018. A complete collection with all three seasons was released in October 16, 2018.
