= Rick Jacobson =

American film director

- Occupations: Film director, television director
- Years active: 1991–present

Rick Jacobson is an American film director, television director and producer, and stage and television actor.

== Biography ==
Jacobson graduated from the California Institute of the Arts film and television program.

Jacobson's most recent works includes 2021's Don't Breathe 2 (executive producer) and Netflix's 2022 romantic comedy, The Royal Treatment (director). He has also directed Bitch Slap (2009), Hercules: The Legendary Journeys, Xena: Warrior Princess, Cleopatra 2525, Spartacus (TV series), and Ash vs Evil Dead.

Jacobson served as an executive producer and director of Spartacus: House of Ashur, which premiered in December 2025.
