= Joel Tobeck =

New Zealand actor

- Born: 2 June 1971 (age 55); Auckland, New Zealand
- Occupation: Actor
- Partner: Yvette Tobeck
- Children: 3
- Mother: Liddy Holloway
- Relatives: Phil Holloway (grandfather)

Joel Tobeck (born 2 June 1971 in Auckland) is a New Zealand actor known for his roles in the television series Tangle, The Doctor Blake Mysteries, Xena Warrior Princess, Hercules: The Legendary Journeys, and Young Hercules and Sons of Anarchy. In 2016 Tobeck began performing as the demon Baal on the show Ash vs Evil Dead.

== Career ==
Tobeck is known for his roles in the television series Tangle, The Doctor Blake Mysteries, Xena Warrior Princess, Hercules: The Legendary Journeys, Young Hercules and Sons of Anarchy. In 2016 Tobeck began performing as the demon Baal on the show Ash vs Evil Dead.

Just before playing ethical police superintendent Lawson of the 1950s and 1960s in The Doctor Blake Mysteries from 2013 to 2017, he took a turn playing a crooked cop of the 1920s in one episode, Blood and Circuses, in the Miss Fisher’s Murder Mysteries, the 11th episode of the first series, in 2012.

== Personal life ==
Tobeck lives in Cambridge with his partner Yvette, with whom he has three children. He is the son of actress Liddy Holloway, and the grandson of former Labour Party minister Phil Holloway.

== Filmography ==
=== Films ===
Year	Film	Role	Notes
1990	The Shrimp on the Barbie	Lance, bar patron	Film
1992	The Summer the Queen Came	Miles	Film
1993	Sure to Rise	Parachutist	Short film
1994	Old Bastards	Waiter	Short film
1999	Channelling Baby	Tony	Film
2003	The Lord of the Rings: The Return of the King	Guritz	Film
2005	Little Fish	Moss	Film
2005	Stealth	Black Ops Leader	Film
2006	A.K.A	Unknown	TV movie
2006	The Silence	Ross Moss	TV movie
2007	Eagle vs Shark	Damon	Film
2007	Ghost Rider	Redneck	Film
2007	30 Days of Night	Doug Hertz	Film
2007	The Water Horse: Legend of the Deep	Sgt. Walker	Film
2009	Accidents Happen	Ray Conway	Film
2010	Feud	Lindsay Ferguson	Film (short)
2010	The Hopes & Dreams of Gazza Snell	Ron	Film
2011	Sleeping Beauty	Businessman	Film
2015	Venus and Mars	Ross Grantham	Film
2018	Mortal Engines	Burgermeister	Film
2024	A Mistake	Alistair	Film

=== Television series ===
Year	TV series	Role	Notes
1989	Strangers	Ludo	Recurring character
1996	Shortland Street	Craig Develter	Guest role
1996–1999	Hercules: The Legendary Journeys	Strife and Deimos	Recurring character
1997	Share the Dream	Bosco	Lead role
1998–1999	Young Hercules	Strife and Deimos	Recurring character
2000–2001	Cleopatra 2525	Creegan	Recurring character
2000–2001	Xena: Warrior Princess	Strife and Deimos	Recurring character
2003	Power Rangers Ninja Storm	Footzilla & Slob Goblin (voices)	2 episodes
2004	Power Rangers Dino Thunder	Jupitor (voice)	Episode "A Ranger Exclusive"
2005	Interrogation	Ken Pringle	S01E09 – "Family Matters"
2007	Without a Trace	Jeff Henry	S05E19 – "At Rest"
2009	30 Seconds	Martin Manning	Main character
2009–2012	Tangle	Tim Williams	Main character
2010	This Is Not My Life	Richard Foster	Main character
2010	Hawaii Five-0	Kurt Miller	S01E11 – "Palekaiko"
2010	Sons of Anarchy	Donny	Recurring character
2010	City Homicide	Richard McCallister	Recurring character
2011	Underbelly NZ: Land of the Long Green Cloud	Gary Majors	Recurring character
2012	Miss Fisher's Murder Mysteries ("Blood and Circuses" episode)	Snr Sgt Grossmith	Guest role
2012	Power Rangers Samurai	Duplicator (voice)	episode "Runaway Spike"
2013–2014	Power Rangers Megaforce	Yuffo & Gorgax (voices)	2 episodes
2013	Spartacus: War of the Damned ("Season 3 Episode 10 "Victory")	Gnaeus Pompeius Magnus (Pompey The Great)	Cameo
2013 - 2016	The Doctor Blake Mysteries	Chief Supt Matthew Lawson	Main character
2015–2016	Shortland Street	Jimmy Isaac	Recurring
2015–2016	Westside	Des McEwen	Recurring
2016–2018	Ash vs. Evil Dead	Baal	Recurring
2018	Harrow	Tom Pimfold	S01E10 – "Mens Rea"
2019	Secret City	Jim Hellier	Season 2
2020	One Lane Bridge	Stephen	Main character
2020	Power Rangers Beast Morphers	Digitron (voice)	Episode "Cruisin for a Bruisin"
2020	The New Legends of Monkey	Cranius	Recurring Character
2020	Black Hands	Robin Bain	Main Character
2022	The Brokenwood Mysteries	Bobby Oades	Episode "From the Cradle to the Grave"
2022	The Luminaries	Ben Lowenthal	Recurring character
2026	Spartacus: House of Ashur	Gnaeus Pompeius Magnus (Pompey The Great)	Guest
