= Ray Santiago =

American actor of Puerto Rican descent (born 1984)

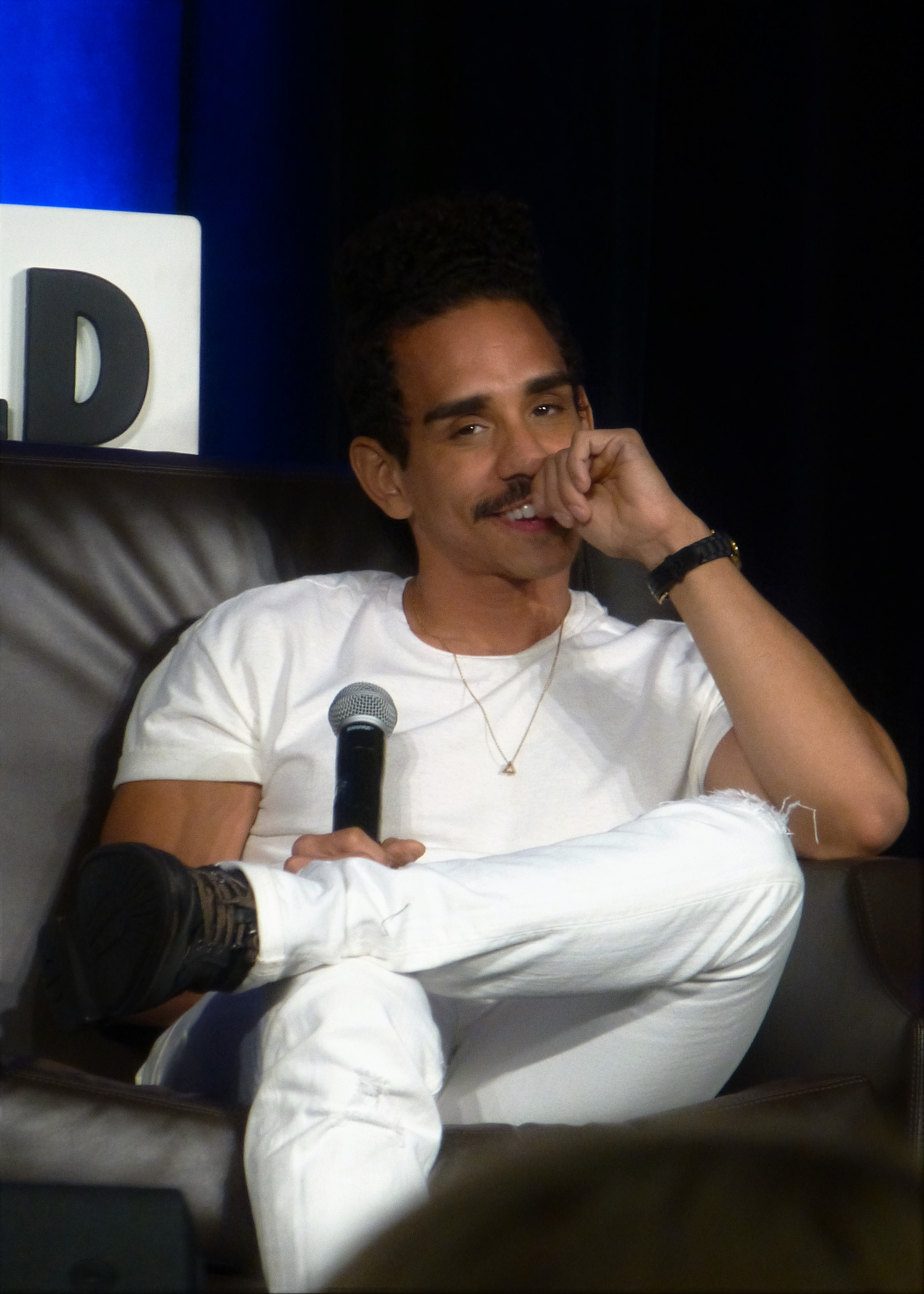
- Santiago at the 2016 Wizard World Chicago
- Born: Raymond Santiago; June 15, 1984 (age 42); South Bronx, New York, U.S.
- Occupation: Actor
- Years active: 2000–present

Raymond Santiago (born June 15, 1984) is an American actor.

== Early life ==
Santiago was born in the South Bronx and is of Puerto Rican descent. He graduated in 2002 from Fiorello H. LaGuardia High School for the Arts in New York City.

== Career ==
Raymond Santiago played Jorge Villalobos in the film Meet the Fockers (2004), and had minor roles in 2005's Dirty Deeds and 2006's Accepted. He also starred as Michelle Rodriguez's brother, Tiny Guzman in the 2000 film Girlfight, as Lardo in 2009's Endless Bummer and as Alberto in Suburban Gothic.

He also performed in the 2006 film The Sasquatch Dumpling Gang (also known as The Sasquatch Gang), alongside Justin Long, and in American Son along Nick Cannon. He also appeared in the 2011 film In Time. Santiago appeared in episodes of the television series My Name is Earl, Crossing Jordan, Law & Order: LA and Dexter. In the Ash vs. Evil Dead television series from 2015 to 2018, he portrayed Pablo Simon Bolivar, an immigrant co-worker who becomes Ash's sidekick.

== Personal life ==
Santiago is gay.

== Filmography ==
=== Films ===
Year	Title	Role	Notes
2025	One of Them Days	Fabian	
2024	Summer Camp	Brian	Credited as Raymond Santiago
2023	EX Weeks Out	Manny	Short film
2015	Friday Night with Crystal	Dancer	Short film
2015	Addiction: A 60's Love Story	Rico	
2014	Sex Ed	Hector	
2014	Suburban Gothic	Alberto	
2014	Date and Switch	Salvador	
2013	National Lampoon Presents: Surf Party	Lardo	
2011	In Time	Victa	
2011	Without Men	Jacinto	
2011	The Thaumaturge		Short film; Executive Producer
2010	500mg of Something	Sug	Short film; Producer
2010	Hypo	Bear's Butler	Director & Executive Producer
2009	El pez	Photographer	Short film
2009	Endless Bummer	Lardo	
2009	Ready or Not	Nacho	
2008	Bar Starz	Captain	
2008	American Son	Miguelito	
2006	Price to Pay	Donnie	
2006	Accepted	Boy Going to Princeton	
2006	The TV Set	Audience Member No. 1	
2006	Dead Man's Morphine	Nat	Short film
2006	The Sasquatch Gang	Crone	
2005	Dirty Deeds	Bobby D	
2004	Meet the Fockers	Jorge Villalobos	
2003	Shelter	Ray	
2003	Bringing Rain	John Bell	
2001	Piñero	Willie	
2000	Girlfight	Tiny Guzman	

=== Television ===
Year	Title	Role	Notes
2024	Chicago Med	Vince Gonzalez	Episode: "What Happens in the Dark Always Comes to Light"
2020	Interrogation	Paul Manning	2 episodes
2018	Into the Dark	Jack	Episode: The Body
2016	Shiny Baby Goats	Rodd Scott	Filming
2015–2018	Ash vs Evil Dead	Pablo Simon Bolivar	30 episodes Main cast Nominated – Fangoria Chainsaw Award for Best TV Supporting Actor (2017)
2015	Backstrom	Moss Brady	Episode: "I Like to Watch"
2014	Bad Judge		2 episodes
2014	NCIS: Los Angeles	Little Dip	Episode: "Windfall"
2013	Touch	Reuben Santiago	4 episodes
2012	Major Crimes	Charles Alvarez	Episode: "The Shame Game"
2011	Law & Order: LA	Ray Mota	Episode: "Zuma Canyon"
2010–2011	Raising Hope	Javier	5 episodes
2009	10 Things I Hate About You	Luis	Episode: "Don't Give Up"
2008	Dexter	Javier	2 episodes
2007	Cane	Manny	Episode: "HurriCane"
2006	My Name Is Earl	Catalina's Brother	2 episodes
2006	Windfall	Ramon	Episode: "Truth Be Told"
2006	Crossing Jordan	Omar 'Lil O' Rodriguez	Episode: "Dreamland"
2004	The Jury	Harry Rivera	Episode: "Bangers"

=== Video games ===
Year	Title	Role
2022	Evil Dead: The Game	Pablo Simon Bolivar
