= Dana DeLorenzo =

American actress

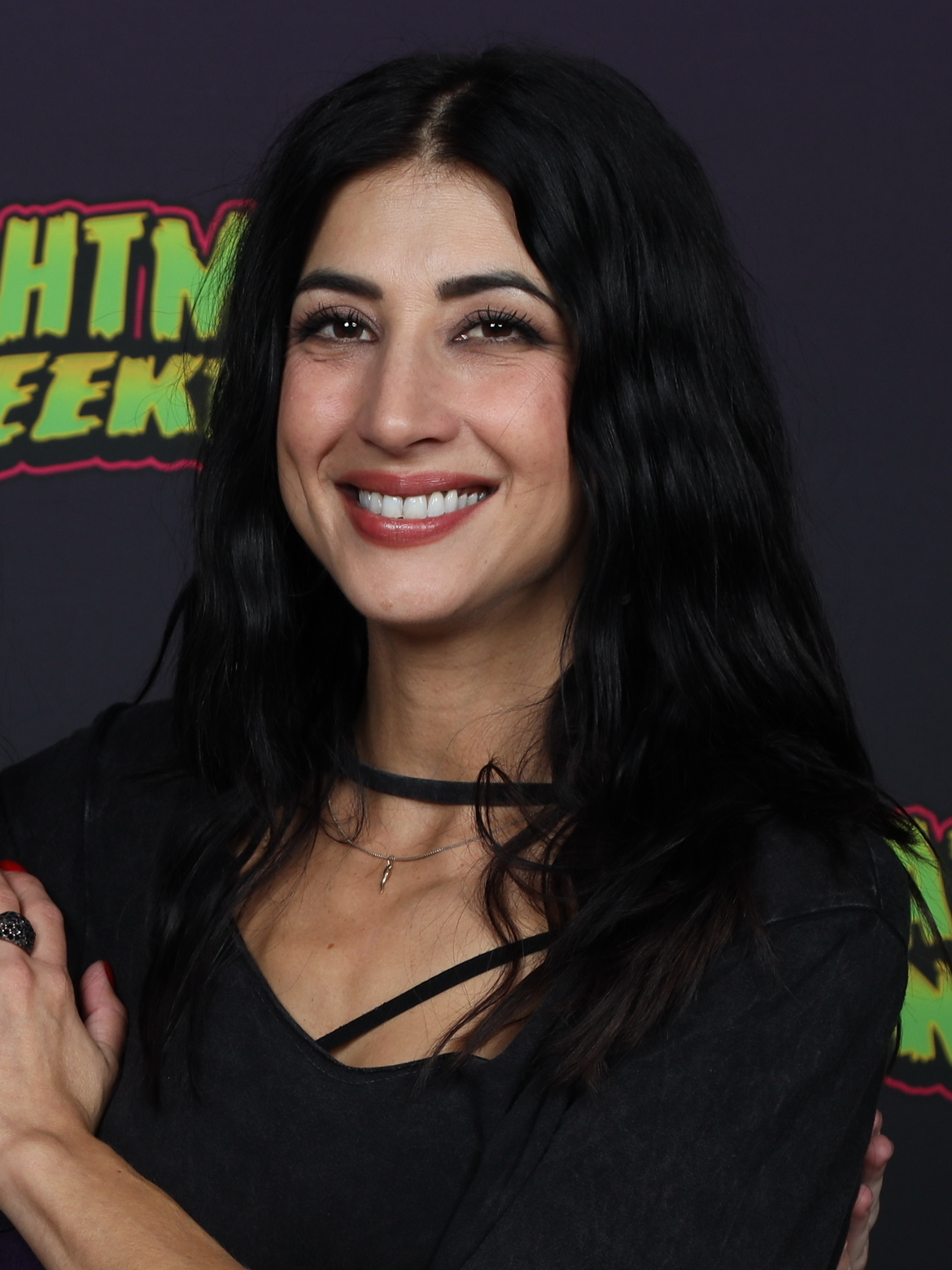
- DeLorenzo at Nightmare Weekend Richmond in 2023
- Occupation: Actress
- Years active: 2004–present

Dana DeLorenzo is an American actress and former radio personality and producer. She is best known for her starring role as Kelly Maxwell in the Starz horror-comedy series Ash vs Evil Dead (2015–2018).

== Career ==
DeLorenzo was a cast member and dance captain in Tony n' Tina's Wedding in Chicago. DeLorenzo worked as a producer and portrayed Marissa Sanchez on the nationally syndicated radio show Mancow's Morning Madhouse for a number of years. She was a regular on The Late Late Show with Craig Ferguson in 2012 as Beth, the CBS Executive.

== Personal life ==
DeLorenzo is of Italian descent.

== Filmography ==
=== Film ===
Year	Title	Role	Notes
2004	Rehearsal Time	Ashley	Short film
2007	Night of the Fireflies	Carmen Valdez	Short film
2008	Rain: A Love Story	Arianna	Short film
2008	Music Box	Alice	Short film
2008	Peep Show	Valerie	Television pilot
2009	October Surprise	Alberta	Short film
2011	A Very Harold & Kumar 3D Christmas	Becca the P.A.	
2011	The Moleman of Belmont Avenue	Stoner Molly	
2013	Timms Valley	Tokyo Board Member	Television film
2014	Two to Go		Television film
2017	Three Women	Samantha	Short film
2017	The Mad Ones	Claire	
2020	Friendsgiving	Barbara	

=== Television ===
Year	Title	Role	Notes
2011	In the Flow with Affion Crockett		
2011	2 Broke Girls	Girl #2	Episode: "And the Break-Up Scene"
2012	Eagleheart	Arty Woman	Episode: "Exit Wound the Gift Shop"
2012	Workaholics	Hot Court Reporter	Episode: "To Kill a Chupacabraj"
2012	Sullivan & Son	Marcy Mintz	Episode: "The Fifth Musketeer"
2012	The Late Late Show with Craig Ferguson	Beth the Executive, Sandra the Rhino	
2013	WJRT Television		
2014	Growing Up Fisher	Kara	Episode: "Katie You Can Drive My Car"
2014	Californication	Attractive Single Woman	Episode: "Grace"
2015	Barely Famous		2 Episodes
2015	Impress Me	Emily / Andrea	12 Episodes
2015–2018	Ash vs Evil Dead	Kelly Maxwell	30 episodes Main Cast; Nominated - Fangoria Chainsaw Award for Best Supporting Actress on Television (2016); Nominated - Fangoria Chainsaw Award for Best TV Supporting Actress (2017)
2016	Driving Arizona	Sasha	Episode: "Firecrackers and Survivors"
2017	Teenage Mutant Ninja Turtles	Esmeralda	Episode: "The Crypt of Dracula"
2018	Will & Grace	Karen's Mom	Episode: "Staten Island Fairly"
2018	Rel	Gloria	Episode: "One Night Stand"
2019	Perpetual Grace, LTD	Valerie Spoonts	Recurring
2023	Tacoma FD	Gigi Bonano	Episode: "Valentine's Day"
2025	9-1-1: Lone Star	NYFD Liaison Krista Triola	Episode: "Fall From Grace"

=== Video games ===
Year	Title	Role	Notes
2022	Evil Dead: The Game	Kelly Maxwell	Voice
