= Offspring season 1 =

Offspring
- Season 1
- DVD Cover Art
- No. of episodes: 13 + Telemovie

Release
- Original network: Network Ten
- Original release: 15 August – 21 November 2010

Season chronology
- Next → Season 2

The first season of Offspring, an Australian drama television series, began airing on 15 August 2010 on Network Ten. The season concluded on 21 November 2010 after 13 episodes and the Pilot – Telemovie.

Offspring is the story of the impossible loves of 30-something obstetrician Nina Proudman (Asher Keddie), and her fabulously messy family, as they navigate the chaos of modern life. The show mixes conventional narrative drama with flashbacks, graphic animation and fantasy sequences.

The first series aired Sundays at 8:30 pm in Australia. The season was released on DVD as a five disc set under the title of Offspring: The Complete First Series and Feature-Length Telemovie on 1 December 2010.

On 21 November 2010, Network Ten aired the final two episodes as a two-hour season finale as two parts. However the episodes have been released separately on iTunes and on the DVD release of Series 1.

== Cast ==
=== Regular ===
- Asher Keddie as Nina Proudman
- Kat Stewart as Billie Proudman
- Don Hany as Chris Havel
- Deborah Mailman as Cherie Butterfield
- Eddie Perfect as Mick Holland
- Richard Davies as Jimmy Proudman
- Linda Cropper as Geraldine Proudman
- and John Waters as Darcy Proudman

=== Recurring ===
- Jane Harber as Zara Perkich
- Alicia Gardiner as Kim Akerholt
- Lachy Hulme as Martin Clegg
- Leah De Niese as Odile
- Christopher Morris as Brendan Wright
- Marta Kaczmarek as Sonja
- John Wood as Gareth Butterfield
- Damon Herriman as Boyd Carlisle
- Kestie Morassi as Ivy
- Kate Atkinson as Renee
- Kate Box as Alice Havel
- Sacha Horler as Stacey
- Matilda Brown as Chloe Fraser
- Paul Denny as Sam Jenkins
- Archie Flegeltaub as Ray Proudman
- Tahlia Accornero as Lucy Havel

=== Guest stars ===
- Ian "Dicko" Dickson as Ian "Dicko" Dickson
- Brian Mannix as Guitar Man
- Shaun Micallef as Lachlan
- Shane Emmett as Dr Patrick

== Episodes ==
No. overall	No. in season	Title	Directed by	Written by	Original release date	Australian viewers (millions)
Pilot	Pilot	"Pilot – Telemovie"	Kate Dennis	Debra Oswald	15 August 2010	1.124
Nina Proudman involves herself in helping her family from their own chaotic lives. Free of family obligations, Nina then arrives back at her flat to find a reminder of her ex-husband Brendan's undying love. Back at work, Nina overhears gossip about her crush, new employee Chris's, past. Billie attempts 'makeup sex' with boyfriend Mick, however a fight erupts when he fails to take her career seriously and Billie reiterates why they can't be together. Heavily pregnant Cherie returns to the hospital for a check-up with old friend and workmate Nina. Before she can leave, Cherie goes into premature labour. During the delivery the women realise the baby's father is Nina's dad, Darcy.
1	1	"Taking Charge"	Kate Dennis	Debra Oswald	22 August 2010	1.084
Nina vows to take charge of her love life, but as things with Brendan come to an end, Chris struggles to explain his past and Nina is left uncertain about their relationship. The Proudman family adjust to life with their newest member, Baby Ray.
2	2	"The Uncomfortability"	Darren Ashton	Jonathan Gavin	29 August 2010	1.122
Nina's insecurities are revealed when a patient poses an awkward request. Meanwhile Geraldine decides to try online dating, and Jimmy is an unexpected saviour to Cherie and Darcy.
3	3	"Playing Aloof"	Darren Ashton	Michael Lucas	5 September 2010	1.001
Believing she interrupted Chris and Zara having sex in the storeroom, Nina spends a sleepless night struggling with her feelings. When Chris finally corners her to talk, Nina protects herself from further humiliation and pretends to be completely unfazed by the whole incident. Cherie and Darcy host a naming ceremony for Baby Ray that sends the Proudman women into a spin. Billie goes to great lengths to make Mick jealous and Jimmy realises that lying has its limits.
4	4	"Poison Ivy"	Sian & Jane Davies	Kylie Needham	12 September 2010	1.160
Love struck Nina struggles to keep focused on everyday life as she's plagued by fantasies of Dr Havel. Billie's plan to make Mick jealous backfires when his old flame, Ivy, shows up. Meanwhile, Cherie and Darcy negotiate the rules of dating as Darcy has a life changing one night stand.
5	5	"Carpe Diem"	Sian & Jane Davies	Debra Oswald & Jonathan Gavin	19 September 2010	0.990
Nina and Chris attempt to seize the moment, but their future is threatened by a complicated past. Cherie's secretive behaviour prompts Billie to start playing detective, and Jimmy and Odile come to a crossroads in their relationship.
6	6	"D-Day"	Kate Dennis	Michael Lucas	26 September 2010	0.943
Nina thinks the worst of her day is over, when, on the morning of her date with Chris Havel, she finds herself navigating the elaborate world of contraception and facing serious performance anxiety issues. Meanwhile, Billie continues to investigate Cherie's mysterious behaviour with an older man, Mick and Ivy break up as he admits he still loves Billie, and much to Jimmy's disgust, Geraldine seems to have the most luck in the bedroom with Mr Soriel, Jimmy's old history teacher.
7	7	"Two Sisters"	Kate Dennis	Debra Oswald	3 October 2010	0.935
Suppressing her feelings, Nina gives Chris some space as he travels to Queensland in search of his missing wife. But with Chris away, and plagued by her own insecurities, Nina makes one very big mistake that will change everything. Meanwhile, Billie can't bring herself to make up with Mick, and Darcy finally learns about Cherie's secret past.
8	8	"Re-Unravel"	Glendyn Ivin	Jonathan Gavin	17 October 2010	0.831
Plagued by the guilt of sleeping with Mick, Nina faces Chris and shocks both of them by blurting out the truth. To her distress Chris is called away to see a patient before she can gauge his response and Nina must turn her focus to a highly risky caesarean on a woman in an induced coma. Still feeling terrible, Nina wonders if she's worthy of such an enormous responsibility. When she finally has a chance to apologise to Chris, he does not pass judgement. And just when Nina and Chris seem to be on track, Dr Havel gets a surprise visitor at the hospital, and all unravels again.
9	9	"Making Peace"	Glendyn Ivin	Jonathan Gavin	24 October 2010	0.989
Still in shock after Alice's unexpected arrival, Nina feels the urge to make peace with her own past and goes to see Brendan. Meanwhile, Billie rights a wrong and as a result, proves her love for Mick.
10	10	"The Other Woman"	Shirley Barrett	Debra Oswald	31 October 2010	0.952
Nina struggles with being the other woman in Chris' life. Meanwhile, Billie reluctantly becomes Stacey's birthing partner. Cherie finds it difficult to be upfront with her new boyfriend about baby Ray, and Jimmy gets more than he bargained for when he becomes a human test subject.
11	11	"My Confessions"	Shirley Barrett	Michael Lucas	14 November 2010	0.908
Almost as shocking as the act itself, Nina will shatter her sister's newfound loved-up happiness with Mick, when she finally brings herself to tell Billie what she did. But not before Mick tells Nina he is going to tell Billie himself and Nina can't stop him. Nina has an awkward meeting with Chris' wife Alice, where, unable to stop imagining the fallout from Mick's confession, she cuts her meeting short then inadvertently runs over Alice's foot in her haste to drive off and confront Billie.
12	12	"Not as Planned"	Kate Dennis	Jonathan Gavin	21 November 2010	0.929
Nina's life has gone from bad to worse since her family discovered her secret. Nobody is willing to forgive her, least of all Billie, and her relationship with Chris is in tatters. Nina is offered a job at Johns Hopkins Hospital in Baltimore and decides to take the offer. Nina and Billie have a confrontation at the Hospital. Cherie and Sam take their relationship to the next level. To be continued...
13	13	"A New Miracle"	Kate Dennis	Debra Oswald	21 November 2010	0.860
Nina prepares to say goodbye and pack up her things. Jimmy organises a farewell BBQ, but is unfortunately shutdown by rain. Kim goes into labour at the pub and gives birth to a baby girl. Billie and Nina make amends. Chris and Nina are left at a crossroads.

== DVD release ==
Offspring – The Complete First Series and Feature-Length Telemovie
Set details	Special features
13 episodes; 5-disc set; 16:9 Widescreen Full Height Anamorphic; English; Subtitles: English	Original Feature-length Telemovie; Offspring: The Nurses (Webisodes)
Release dates
Australia; 1 December 2010
