= Offspring season 7 =

Offspring
- Season 7
- No. of episodes: 10

Release
- Original network: Network Ten
- Original release: 28 June – 30 August 2017

Season chronology
- ← Previous; Season 6

The seventh and final season of Offspring, an Australian drama television series, premiered on Network TEN on 28 June 2017.

On 4 November 2016, the series was renewed for a seventh season set to air in 2017. Production for the series began in March 2017 in Melbourne.

== Cast ==
=== Main ===
- Asher Keddie as Nina Proudman
- Kat Stewart as Billie Proudman
- Richard Davies as Jimmy Proudman
- Deborah Mailman as Cherie Butterfield
- Jane Harber as Zara Perkich Proudman
- Linda Cropper as Geraldine Proudman
- Alexander England as Harry Crewe
- Alicia Gardiner as Kim Akerholt
- T.J. Power as Will Bowen

=== Supporting ===
- Ash Ricardo as Kerry Green
- Shannon Berry as Brody Jordan
- Lawrence Leung as Elvis Kwan
- Sarah Peirse as Marjorie Van Dyke
- Cate Wolfe as Jess
- Isabella Monaghan as Zoe Proudman-Reid
- Adrienne Pickering as Kirsty Crewe
- David Roberts as Phil D'Arabont
- Neil Melville as Drew Crewe

=== Guest ===
- Osher Günsberg as The Bachelor Australia host

== Episodes ==
No. overall	No. in season	Title	Directed by	Written by	Original release date	Australian viewers (millions)
76	1	"Happy Geraldine Day"	Shirley Barrett	Jonathan Gavin	28 June 2017	0.724
Nina, now the acting head of obstetrics at St Francis, is overjoyed at Harry's return after spending time working in Guyana. Zara continues to struggle. Kerry and Billie unconsciously flirt with their latest client. Geraldine invites the whole family over for the latest Geraldine day, dropping a bombshell on them. Kim and Jess approach a new candidate for their sperm donor. Elvis is rattled while operating on a patient. Billie feels a sense of disconnect with Mick.
77	2	"The End of an Era"	Shirley Barrett	Leon Ford	5 July 2017	0.594
Nina's competitive side comes out full force at Zoe's Father's Day picnic. Will and Kerry get a new addition to their family. Harry tries to introduce his sister Kirsty to Nina. Billie returns from London. Brody turns to the internet to diagnose Bob's health issues. Jimmy runs out of patience with Zara. Marjorie gives Geraldine a lesson on etiquette. Nina is in awe of a former co-worker whom she meets at a St Francis function.
78	3	"Episode 3"	Matthew Moore	Christine Bartlett	12 July 2017	0.459
An overworked Nina is relieved that Martin and Cherie are finally returning, but Cherie gives Nina bad news. Harry pitches ideas to his dad to improve his workplace. Billie goes shopping for a mental health professional to help her with her grieving. Will and Kerry have their first fight. Zara and Jimmy have it out in public. While the ladies are out clubbing to forget their woes, Geraldine offers her own brand of support to both Jimmy and Will.
79	4	"Episode 4"	Matthew Moore	Alice Bell	19 July 2017	0.646
Nina invites Harry's ex-girlfriend over for dinner. Kerry finds a candidate to serve as the first brick for Billie's sex wall. Darcy's bench disappears from the park, prompting Geraldine to go looking for it. Zara begs Kim for shifts at St Francis. Jimmy and Kerry make a huge mistake. Nina makes an offer to Harry.
80	5	"Episode 5"	Ben Chessell	Leon Ford	26 July 2017	0.559
Harry arrives at Nina's with only 2 bags. Billie sees both Kerry and Jimmy acting weird. Nina thinks she just got Martin fired. Kerry finds another brick for Billie's sex wall. Kim prints out Cherie's correspondences to Martin. Will asks Jimmy to be his spontaneity guru. Nina is nervous about meeting Harry's whole family for dinner. Geraldine goes out for the evening but does not reveal with whom. Brody tells Billie about how she feels about Jason.
81	6	"Episode 6"	Ben Chessell	Claire Phillips	2 August 2017	0.559
Nina and Harry have unprotected sex, prompting the question of starting a family together. Billie makes a mistake with her latest brick on her sex wall and now needs to fix it. Jimmy & Kerry decide to come clean about their indiscretion. Nina covertly attends to two unofficial patients at St Francis. Harry submits his final recommendations for his father's company. Geraldine continues to act strangely. Zara pleads to Jimmy to come home. Will and Kerry meet for the first time after their big fight. With the support of the staff and Harry, Nina considers a step up in her career.
82	7	"Episode 7"	Shannon Murphy	Christine Bartlett	9 August 2017	0.618
Nina has her job interview. Ray, with the help of Cherie, invites everyone to his 10th birthday party. Will calls Jimmy asking to meet him, sending a sense of dread through Jimmy. Zara and Jimmy's relationship takes another turn. Billie does not know if meeting with her company's handsome client is a business meeting or a date. Harry's mother tries to start the reconciliation process between Harry and his dad. Billie is still intrigued by her last brick of her sex wall, choosing to meet him again. Will experiences first-hand what it feels like to be part of the Proudman family as Kerry feels remorseful about it. Brody asks a huge favour to Billie regarding Jason.
83	8	"Episode 8"	Shannon Murphy	Alice Bell	16 August 2017	0.556
Nina and Harry disagree on how to discipline Zoe. Billie offers her services to help Nina with the next step of her career. Cherie is disappointed with Martin. Jimmy and Will continue to have a frosty relationship. Billie meets a significant man from her past. Marjorie is the subject of an intervention. Nina, Kim, and Cherie help an expectant mother with a most difficult delivery. Nina has surprising news for Harry.
84	9	"Episode 9"	Peter Salmon	Leon Ford	23 August 2017	0.568
Nina and Harry invite both their families for dinner to announce their news. Will decides to be spontaneous with Kerry. Nina meets the new head of Obstetrics. Billie decides to brush off her suitor in a grand manner. Zara starts her first day of her second stint of medical school. Brody discusses her immediate family plans with Billie. Geraldine unveils the identity of the man she's seeing. Will and Kerry have news of their own. Nina makes a snap career decision.
85	10	"Episode 10"	Peter Salmon	Jonathan Gavin	30 August 2017	0.545
Nina feels pushed by Harry to tell Zoe the news. Cherie is torn between two choices for her side venture. Billie organizes a party for both Will and Kerry as well as for Nina and Harry. Geraldine explains her companion choice to Nina. Billie sets Nina up with a new career lead. Zoe moves both Harry and Nina with her request. Kerry reveals a secret to Will. Billie finds out the true identity of her suitor. Marjorie rectifies matters with Will. Zara gives Jimmy advice on his best career option. Ray finds a solution for Cherie and Martin. Phil D'Arabont gives Billie a gift. Nina contemplates a new career path.

== Viewership ==
Episode	Title	Original airdate	Overnight Viewers	Nightly Rank	Consolidated Viewers	Adjusted Rank
1	Happy Geraldine Day	28 June 2017	0.724	7	0.879	7
2	The End of an Era	5 July 2017	0.594	15	0.680	13
3	Episode 3	12 July 2017	0.459	17	0.602	12
4	Episode 4	19 July 2017	0.645	12	0.805	9
5	Episode 5	26 July 2017	0.559	17	0.686	13
6	Episode 6	2 August 2017	0.559	17	0.737	14
7	Episode 7	9 August 2017	0.618	14	0.757	11
8	Episode 8	16 August 2017	0.556	19	0.728	12
9	Episode 9	23 August 2017	0.568	19	0.721	13
10	Episode 10	30 August 2017	0.545	19	0.690	12
