= Offspring season 2 =

Offspring
- Season 2
- DVD Cover Art
- No. of episodes: 13

Release
- Original network: Network Ten
- Original release: 16 May – 20 July 2011

Season chronology
- ← Previous; Season 1 Next → Season 3

The second season of Offspring was confirmed by Network Ten on 14 September 2010 and began airing 16 May 2011. The season concluded on 20 July 2011 after 13 episodes. Offspring is the story of the impossible loves of 30-something obstetrician Nina Proudman (Asher Keddie), and her fabulously messy family, as they navigate the chaos of modern life.

The season was released on DVD as a four disc set under the title of Offspring: The Complete Second Series on 14 September 2011.

== Cast ==
=== Regular ===
- Asher Keddie as Nina Proudman
- Kat Stewart as Billie Proudman
- Matthew Le Nevez as Patrick Reid
- Deborah Mailman as Cherie Butterfield
- Eddie Perfect as Mick Holland
- Richard Davies as Jimmy Proudman
- Linda Cropper as Geraldine Proudman
- and John Waters as Darcy Proudman

=== Recurring ===
- Jane Harber as Zara Perkich
- Alicia Gardiner as Kim Akerholt
- Lachy Hulme as Martin Clegg
- Kate Atkinson as Renee
- Paul Denny as Sam Jenkins
- Jay Ryan as Fraser King
- Emma Griffin as Tammy
- Jonny Pasvolsky as Ben Forbes
- Henry and Jude Schimizzi Peart as Ray Proudman
- Dan Spielman as Andrew Holland
- Kate Jenkinson as Kate Reid
- Tina Bursill as Marilyn Bassett

=== Guest starring ===
- Andrew Rochford as Andrew Rochford
- Carrie Bickmore as Carrie Bickmore
- Dave Roberts as Phil D'Arabont
- Alison Bell as Louise
- Jane Badler as Wendy

=== Special guest starring ===
- Don Hany as Chris Havel

== Production ==
Alicia Gardiner, who plays nurse Kim Akerholt in the series, had confirmed that shooting for Series 2 began on 10 February 2011.

== Episodes ==
No. overall	No. in season	Title	Directed by	Written by	Original release date	Australian viewers (millions)
14	1	"The Return"	Kate Dennis	Debra Oswald	16 May 2011	0.927
After spending five months in Baltimore, Nina returns home after receiving news of her father Darcy's heart attack. Billie and Mick are now temporarily living at Nina's apartment and trying for a baby. Jimmy also returns after being abroad with new girlfriend Tammy. Nina finds out that Chris has moved to Brisbane with Alice and Lucy. Darcy asks Geraldine to renew their vows and Nina meets the new registrar, Fraser King, at the hospital. To be continued...
15	2	"Baby Bumps"	Kate Dennis	Michael Lucas	16 May 2011	0.760
Nina and Fraser continue to get to know each other. Cherie returns to her job as a nurse at the hospital. Billie and Mick discover they will have to go through IVF in order to have a baby. Nina goes on a date with her father's Cardiologist Ben. Billie reveals to Mick she had two abortions during her teens.
16	3	"Dates, Decisions & Divorces"	Ken Cameron	Christine Bartlett	23 May 2011	0.905
Nina tries to fight her attraction to Fraser, soon enough finds herself on a date with the young registrar. Meanwhile, Cherie makes a decision about her future with fireman Sam, and Billie begins her fertility treatment. Darcy and Geraldine decide it's time to finally get a divorce.
17	4	"Together, We Are One"	Ken Cameron	Jonathan Gavin	30 May 2011	0.953
Nina and Fraser are up in arms about the new anaesthetist, Patrick Reid. But soon realise that he is not who he seems to be. Meanwhile, Jimmy and Mick console each other after their respective partners insult their manhood.
18	5	"The Way You Are"	Daina Reid	Ian Meadows	6 June 2011	0.954
Nina struggles on what to do after Fraser freezes again during a routine consultation. Meanwhile, Mick and his brother Andrew fight over past issues, and Jimmy is upset by his parents, after Geraldine confesses that Jimmy will make a big mistake if he marries Tammy.
19	6	"Behind Closed Doors"	Daina Reid	Michael Lucas	13 June 2011	0.982
Nina rallies the Proudmans in an attempt to reunite her family after Cherie discovers that Jimmy and Tammy are planning a secret wedding. Amidst all the chaos, Billie, Mick and Andrew try to make the baby situation work. Adding to the stress of the wedding day, Tammy's ex-boyfriend arrives most unhappy about the situation.
20	7	"Cheating on Your Test"	Shirley Barrett	Debra Oswald	20 June 2011	0.995
Nina wakes up to find Jimmy has spent the night with one of her co-workers. When a tragedy strikes at work, Nina and Patrick console each other. A somber Jimmy decides to make a video of the family house now that Geraldine has decided to sell. Billie and Mick find out the results of their pregnancy test. Darcy discovers Geraldine is sleeping with her realtor and his business competitor, Phil D'Arabont.
21	8	"Two Different Places"	Shirley Barrett	Jonathan Gavin	22 June 2011	0.904
Exhilarated after their night of passion, Nina is determined to master the art of a casual fling, but Patrick seems to want something more. Mick feels emasculated by his brother Andrew's latest gesture. Darcy acquires a controversial property to sell as a way to get back at Phil D'Arabont. Nina scavenges through Patrick's apartment looking for evidence of his rumoured drug use but comes up empty. Nina's actions disappoint Patrick so much so that they decide that it is best not to have a relationship.
22	9	"Just Keep Talking"	Emma Freeman	Christine Bartlett	27 June 2011	0.938
Nina finds her phone and internet service has been cut off due to lack of payment. Intent on being professional and trying to forget her personal problems with Patrick, Nina is alarmed when Dr. Clegg asks they write a report together. Meanwhile, Billie and Mick accidentally buy a house. A long evening of report writing leads to Nina and Patrick reuniting. Nina delivers some tough news to Billie and Mick that they have had a miscarriage.
23	10	"Acceptance"	Emma Freeman	Michael Lucas	29 June 2011	1.070
When Patrick's sister Kate catches Nina in Patrick's apartment stark naked, and suggests to have a dinner party at Patrick's place, Nina enters into a frenzy over the state of her relationship. Even after moving into their new house, Mick notices Billie's way of grieving is by avoiding him. Mick and Andrew mull over the current situation. Patrick charms the Proudmans. Billie accepts Mick's marriage proposal.
24	11	"Complications"	Kate Dennis	Tony McNamara	6 July 2011	0.825
Nina and Patrick decide they want to fight for their relationship, but an email from Chris Havel saying he is returning to Melbourne for Dr. Martin Clegg's book launch throw a spanner in the works?. Meanwhile, a family intervention about Jimmy and the way he is living his life is planned by Darcy and Geraldine, after Jimmy accidentally kills some expensive fish that cost Mick's landscaping job that was worth $25,000.
25	12	"What Goes Around Comes Around"	Kate Dennis	Jonathan Gavin	13 July 2011	0.960
Nina's life gets thrown into a whirlwind when Chris returns. Billie finally meets Mick's mother, and Cherie has a health scare with Ray. Zara reveals to Jimmy that she's pregnant with his baby.Chris Havel is contemplating whether he will stay in Melbourne. Nina needs to decide who she will choose, the charming Partick Reid or her old flame Chris Havel.
26	13	"Proudman Wedding Curse"	Kate Dennis	Debra Oswald	20 July 2011	0.997
Nina makes a very important decision about her love life, confessing that she has fallen in love with Patrick, and Patrick feels the same way. Billie and Mick defy the 'Proudman Wedding curse', after being kicked out of the first venue after the owner of the unsold house returns unexpectedly, they instead have the wedding in the Union Club Hotel Pub. Zara and Jimmy decide to keep the baby. Cherie discovers a shocking family secret; Nina is not Darcy's biological daughter, which means that Ray is not Nina's half-brother.

== Season Ratings ==
Australian viewers

	Title	Original airdate	Viewers	Nightly Rank
1	"The Return" (Part 1)	16 May 2011	0.927	12
2	"Baby Bumps" (Part 2)	16 May 2011	0.760	16
3	"Dates, Decisions & Divorces"	23 May 2011	0.905	12
4	"Together We Are One"	30 May 2011	0.953	11
5	"The Way You Are"	6 June 2011	0.954	11
6	"Behind Closed Doors"	13 June 2011	0.982	13
7	"Cheating on Your Test"	20 June 2011	0.995	11
8	"Two Different Places"	22 June 2011	0.904	10
9	"Just Keep Talking"	27 June 2011	0.938	10
10	"Acceptance"	29 June 2011	1.070	6
11	"Complications"	6 July 2011	0.825	14
12	"What Goes Around Comes Around"	13 July 2011	0.960	9
13	"Proudman Wedding Curse"	20 July 2011	0.997	6
