= Offspring season 5 =

Offspring
- Season 5
- Season 5 DVD
- No. of episodes: 13

Release
- Original network: Network Ten
- Original release: 14 May – 6 August 2014

Season chronology
- ← Previous; Season 4 Next → Season 6

The fifth season of Offspring, an Australian drama television series, premiered on Network TEN on 14 May 2014 and concluded on 6 August 2014.

== Production ==
Offspring was commissioned for a 13-episode fifth series on 12 July 2012 as part of a two-season renewal.

Filming for series five began on 21 October 2013 and concluded on 19 February 2014.

Series five of Offspring picks up six months after Patrick's death and revolves around the journey of Nina Proudman as she navigates through single parenthood with the help of sister Billie, the bringing up of her daughter Zoe and her determination to jump back into work.

== Cast ==
=== Main ===
- Asher Keddie as Nina Proudman
- Kat Stewart as Billie Proudman
- Matthew Le Nevez as Patrick Reid (Note: Although Matthew Le Nevez's character had died, he was still listed in the opening title sequence)
- Richard Davies as Jimmy Proudman
- Jane Harber as Zara Perkich-Proudman (Note: Jane Harber had been listed as recurring in episodes 1 through 5 before being introduced into the opening title sequence)
- Patrick Brammall as Leo Taylor (Note: Patrick Brammall had been listed as a guest before being introduced into the opening title sequence)
- Ido Drent as Lawrence Pethbridge
- Linda Cropper as Geraldine Proudman
- Deborah Mailman as Cherie Butterfield
- Ben Barrington as Thomas Buchdahl (Note: Ben Barrington had been listed as recurring in episodes 3 through 5 before being introduced into the opening title sequence)
- Eddie Perfect as Mick Holland
- Lachy Hulme as Martin Clegg

=== Recurring ===
- Alicia Gardiner as Kim Akerholt
- Lawrence Leung as Elvis Kwan
- Celia Pacquola as Ange Navarro

=== Guest ===
- Mia & Willow Sindle, Isabella Monaghan and Zara Mclellan as Zoe Proudman-Reid
- Ben & Sam Hunter, Teah Whalan and Cleo Mete as Alfie Proudman
- Jude Mace and Indianna Lee as Paddy Proudman
- Cate Wolfe as Jess
- Maude Davey as Dr Nadine Samir
- David Roberts as Phil D'Arabont
- Kate Jenkinson as Kate Reid

=== Special guest ===
- Garry McDonald as Phillip Noonan
- John Waters as Darcy Proudman
- Clare Bowditch as Rosanna Harding

==== Casting ====
Kate Jenkinson, who recurred as Kate Reid, had to be written out of the season due to her ABC series Super Fun Night being picked up the states. It was announced Matthew Le Nevez will star in series five, despite his character, Patrick dying in the penultimate episode of series four. Le Nevez is still credited as main cast.

== Episodes ==
No. overall	No. in season	Title	Directed by	Written by	Original release date	Australian viewers (millions)
53	1	"Back in the Game"	Emma Freeman	Debra Oswald	14 May 2014	0.931
Baby Zoe is now 6 months old with Nina and Billie taking care of her during this time. Jimmy and Zara are expecting again. Nina's first day back at work sees some surprises regarding the staff as well as Nina questioning her own abilities. Billie and Ange continue their new business together, House Proud, only to discover their latest client is Lawrence Pethbridge. Phillip announces some surprising news to the Proudmans. Nina tells Billie that she may never be in a relationship again, only to get a call from Lawrence asking to meet to discuss a private personal matter.
54	2	"When Sparks Fly"	Emma Freeman	Michael Lucas	21 May 2014	0.817
Jimmy has a new look coinciding with the opening night of a new location of his business as well as a surprise for Zara. Nina is asked to help deliver the baby of her ex-husband and new partner. Billie meets Lawrence for coffee. Zara is insulted that Elvis does not see one of her best character traits.
55	3	"Moving On"	Emma Freeman	Leon Ford	28 May 2014	0.766
Kim lashes out at the staff of St. Francis as her personal life falls apart. Billie prepares restlessly for Mick's imminent return. Nina Skypes with Kate now that she has a new life. Nina has to go to the airport to pick up Phillip and his wife after their honeymoon. Flight delays and circumstances has Nina contemplating casual sex with a handsome stranger she has met at the airport, Leo. Nina comes home to a despondent Billie, who has been crushed by Mick's revelation.
56	4	"Winners and Losers"	Kate Dennis	Li-Kim Chuah	4 June 2014	0.828
Nina and Billie are invited to their 20th anniversary high school reunion. While Nina tries to convince everyone shes happy to go, Billie has her own reasons not to attend. As Jimmy prepares for the wedding, Zara confides her true feelings to him. Still hurting from Mick's revelation, Billie reaches out to both Rosanna and Lawrence. Nina breaks down to Billie regarding her grieving for Patrick. Nina keeps bumping into Thomas, a stranger she first met at the pool.
57	5	"The Story of My Life"	Kate Dennis	Jonathan Gavin	11 June 2014	0.804
Nina gets a social media friend request from Thomas. Kim hires a new male midwife, much to Nina's shock. Billie & Ange pull out all the stops to make Lawrence's apartment fetch the maximum price as it goes to auction. Zara goes into labour, prompting her to reconsider her relationship with Jimmy. Nina comes to terms with Patrick.
58	6	"Emergencies"	Wayne Blair	Michael Lucas	18 June 2014	0.823
Nina and Thomas unexpectedly spend time together. Zara senses that Leo has had a past connection with Nina. Nina takes Zoe to see Phillip for her nine-month checkup. Lawrence hangs out with Billie for the day, including helping Jimmy visit houses for sale.
59	7	"I'm Always Here"	Wayne Blair	Debra Oswald	25 June 2014	0.865
The prognosis is dire, prompting Nina to contemplate being tested as a suitable organ donor. Billie steps in for Jimmy, running his business, which also sees Lawrence drop in for a visit. Nina gives hope to Thomas about dating.
60	8	"Expect the Unexpected"	Daina Reid	Jonathan Gavin	2 July 2014	0.746
Date night with Thomas has finally arrived for Nina but receives bad news at the last minute. Dr Clegg is tasked with looking after Zoe. Kim, Leo, and Nina go out for drinks at Kitty Punch. Billie finds herself out of work again but pitches a business case for an untapped market to Jimmy and Phillip. Geraldine tries to get Darcy's attention and affection. Zara gives Geraldine a gift for her gesture. Billie continues her fiery exchanges with Lawrence.
61	9	"Return, Romance, Repeat"	Daina Reid	Christine Bartlett	9 July 2014	0.738
Nina is excited about another date with Thomas. Billie and Lawrence take another step into their relationship. Jimmy worries about Zara's new obsession but Phillip is supportive. Nina and Leo go through the most difficult of baby deliveries, which leaves Billie tending to Thomas. Kim hires back Cherie much to the chagrin of Dr Clegg. Billie gets unexpected news from Mick. Nina is appreciative of how supportive Thomas is.
62	10	"Introduction"	Peter Salmon	Leon Ford	16 July 2014	0.981
Mick is visiting Melbourne for a week but Billie is unexpectedly calm. Dr Clegg continues to deal with the discomfort of having Cherie back at work. Thomas and Nina are embarrassed by their indiscretion. Billie tries to set Ange up with Leo. Dr Clegg notices Zara's current obsession. Thomas finally gets to meet Nina's family. Nina contemplates telling Billie the truth about Mick's situation.
63	11	"Love, Pain and the Whole Damn Thing"	Peter Salmon	Michael Lucas	23 July 2014	0.905
The Proudman offspring have an all-nighter dealing with each other's problems. Billie is overwhelmed by Lawrence's revelation while Jimmy is both supportive yet concerned with Zara's new intended career path. Thomas expresses disappointment in how closed Nina is about her personal life. Kim confides to Cherie about her proposal for Clegg. Billie runs off in the night to see Mick perform one last time. Nina and Leo are both shocked by the family relation of their latest patient.
64	12	"Life Changing Decisions"	Emma Freeman	Jonathan Gavin	30 July 2014	0.847
Leo acts quickly and discreetly to avoid embarrassing Nina. Zara is constantly interrupted by the Proudmans. Lawrence scolds Billie on her behaviour. Dr Clegg comes up with a solution for both Cherie and Kim. Billie makes up her mind. Nina reveals a weak moment to Leo.
65	13	"When Life Gives You Lemons..."	Emma Freeman	Debra Oswald	6 August 2014	0.992
Billie leaves Australia for a new life overseas. The truth about Thomas and Nina's relationship comes out. Nina avoids Leo. Darcy throws a birthday party for Zoe in light of Nina grieving over the anniversary of Patrick's death. Dr Clegg shares his living solution to Kim and Cherie. St Francis is inundated with an emergency of epic proportions. Phillip gets the surprise of his life.

== Ratings ==
Episode	Title	Original airdate	Overnight Viewers	Consolidated Viewers	Nightly Rank	Adjusted Rank
1	"Back in the Game"	14 May 2014	0.931	1.082	8	6
2	"When Sparks Fly"	21 May 2014	0.817	1.020	9	7
2	"Moving On"	28 May 2014	0.766	0.904	12	10
3	"Winners and Losers"	4 June 2014	0.828	1.026	10	6
5	"The Story of My Life"	11 June 2014	0.804	0.999	9	7
6	"Emergencies"	18 June 2014	0.823	0.965	12	9
7	"I'm Always Here"	25 June 2014	0.865	1.064	9	7
8	"Expect the Unexpected"	2 July 2014	0.746	0.923	12	10
9	"Return, Romance, Repeat"	9 July 2014	0.738	0.913	12	9
10	"Introduction"	16 July 2014	0.981	1.140	6	3
11	"Love, Pain and the Whole Damn Thing"	23 July 2014	0.905	1.083	8	6
12	"Life Changing Decisions"	30 July 2014	0.847	1.090	8	3
13	"When Life Gives You Lemons..."	6 August 2014	0.992	1.150	6	3

Figures are OzTAM Data for the 5 City Metro areas. Overnight - Live broadcast and recordings viewed the same night. Consolidated - Live broadcast and recordings viewed within the following seven days.
