= Offspring season 4 =

Offspring
- Season 4
- No. of episodes: 13

Release
- Original network: Network Ten
- Original release: 22 May – 14 August 2013

Season chronology
- ← Previous; Season 3 Next → Season 5

The fourth season of Offspring, an Australian drama television series, premiered on 22 May 2013 on Network TEN. The season concluded after 13 episodes. Offspring is the a buoyant romantic comedy about the life (and the impossible loves) of 30-something obstetrician Nina Proudman (Asher Keddie) and her fabulously messy family, as they navigate the chaos of modern life.

== Cast ==
=== Regular ===
- Asher Keddie as Nina Proudman
- Kat Stewart as Billie Proudman
- Matthew Le Nevez as Patrick Reid
- Deborah Mailman as Cherie Butterfield (up to ep. 4)
- Eddie Perfect as Mick Holland
- Richard Davies as Jimmy Proudman
- Linda Cropper as Geraldine Proudman
- with Lachy Hulme as Martin Clegg
- and John Waters as Darcy Proudman (up to ep. 4, recurring thereafter)

=== Recurring ===
- Jane Harber as Zara Perkich
- Alicia Gardiner as Kim Akerholt
- Kate Jenkinson as Kate Reid
- Henry & Jude Schimizzi Peart as Ray Proudman
- Ido Drent as Lawrence Pethbridge
- Caren Pistorius as Eloise Ward
- Kevin Hofbauer as Joseph Green
- Ben & Sam Hunter, Teah Whalan, Cleo Mete as Alfie Proudman

=== Guest starring ===
- Kamahl as Dr. Bandari
- Robbie Magasiva as Ugly Pete

=== Special guest starring ===
- Garry McDonald as Phillip Noonan
- Clare Bowditch as Rosanna Harding

== Episodes ==
No. overall	No. in season	Title	Directed by	Written by	Original release date	Australian viewers (millions)
40	1	"Outside of the Comfort Zone"	Emma Freeman	Debra Oswald	22 May 2013	0.868
Patrick and Nina prepare for parenthood by seeing a counselor, Dr Lawrence Pethbridge. Nina gets a new registrar. Jimmy and Zara bring Alfie home. Darcy feels alone and considers an offer to buy his business. Mick finally comes home but Billie doesn't take being the remaining childless Proudman offspring very well.
41	2	"Second Chances"	Emma Freeman	Jonathan Gavin	29 May 2013	0.798
Nina suspects that Patrick and Eloise may have once been lovers. Billie and Mick make good on paying back Nina. Darcy does not take Billie seriously as a potential buyer for his business. Mick and Nina catch Geraldine, Phillip, and Darcy in a compromising position. Eloise reveals her connection to Patrick.
42	3	"Truth Time"	Emma Freeman	Christine Bartlett & Michael Lucas	5 June 2013	0.737
Nina and Patrick try to solve their problems without resorting to sex, at the same time as Nina’s forced to tell Patrick the truth about Eloise. Kate goes out on a date with someone she initially despised. Billie is less than thrilled about her photos for her new business. Darcy and Cherie have a big announcement, prompting Cherie to deliver bad news to Dr Clegg. Zara has second thoughts about returning to work full-time. Patrick and Eloise sort out their animosity. Nina sees a suspicious text message from Eloise on Patrick's phone.
43	4	"Keeping it in the Family"	Shirley Barrett	Michael Lucas	12 June 2013	0.847
Nina admits feeling angry about Darcy not being there when her baby will be born. Phillip receives the brunt of Geraldine's frustration regarding Darcy's plans. Patrick meets Joseph for the first time. Jimmy applies to be Billie's underling at her new business. Patrick tries to convince Dr Clegg to say a proper goodbye to Cherie. Kate opens up about her previous relationship to Joseph. Darcy, Cherie, and Ray drive off in their combi. Eloise reveals the nature of her discomfort to Nina.
44	5	"The Things We Do for Love"	Shirley Barrett	Debra Oswald	19 June 2013	0.770
Nina is confronted by the nature of Eloise’s crush. Billie insists she and Mick meet the press as a power couple. Jimmy’s pitches a new business venture to the family which is met by skepticism by Geraldine. Phillip is concerned about Geraldine's alcohol and marijuana consumption. Dr Clegg continues to deteriorate. Billie is deeply worried about how her new business is operating.
45	6	"Difficulty"	Ben Chessell	Samantha Strauss	26 June 2013	0.583
Nina and Patrick deal with a rather difficult house guest. Billie attempts to cover her business woes. Jimmy launches his pop up business venture. Dr Clegg decides to cope with his grieving head on. Nina and Geraldine confront Phil D'Arabont. Billie has to break devastating news to Darcy.
46	7	"Smoking Situations"	Ben Chessell	Leon Ford	3 July 2013	0.696
With Patrick's and Kate's father coming to visit to meet her and Isabella, Nina dreams of helping bridge a reconciliation between him and Patrick. Geraldine forces Phillip to partake in marijuana with her. Kate contemplates meeting her violent ex-boyfriend but Patrick is not at all pleased when he finds out. The article about Billie and Mick comes out in the paper but Jimmy and Mick try to make sure Billie doesn't read it. Billie is fired and makes an unforgettable scene for Phil D'Arabont.
47	8	"Freaking the Freak Out"	Kate Dennis	Michael Lucas	10 July 2013	0.711
Nina and Patrick both do not want to attend their next counselling session. Kate meets up with her abusive ex-boyfriend. Dr Pethbridge suggests Nina attend a counselling session alone. Kim is scolded by Nina for her lack of discretion regarding Eloise's sexual history. Billie is overwhelmed with sadness as Mick becomes an overnight sensation with female fans even as she has suffered professional setbacks.
48	9	"Numbing the Pain"	Kate Dennis	Jonathan Gavin	17 July 2013	0.625
Nina has a sex dream but the person she is with is not Patrick. Mick heads off out of town for a festival gig while Billie starts a new job. Dr Clegg returns to work. Phillip feels taken for granted by Geraldine. Nina's pregnancy is put in jeopardy when she cannot feel the baby. Kim and Zara bring Eloise to a club. Billie and Ange meet Ugly Pete.
49	10	"Matters of the Heart"	Jennifer Perrott	Debra Oswald & Jonathan Gavin & Charlie Garber	24 July 2013	0.723
Billie turns up at Nina and Patrick's home in the early morning. Nina and Patrick conceive a cover up story while explaining Billie's whereabouts to Mick. Phillip gives Nina some bad news. Geraldine crashes Phillip's African dance class, much to his annoyance. Jimmy and Zara contemplate an open relationship. Billie addresses her crisis of conscience head on.
50	11	"Dialing Up the Crazy"	Jennifer Perrott	Michael Lucas	31 July 2013	0.874
Patrick serves as a surrogate Nina while she gets some much needed bed rest. While Nina and Patrick see Dr Pethbridge one last time, Nina's phone pocket dials the family home on Geraldine day, who along with Phillip, Zara and Jimmy, hear Nina's intimate thoughts about the family. Geraldine is shocked with disbelief that Phillip has gone on with life without her. Billie finds out about Rosanna and Mick's tour plans. Eloise finds a despondent Billie in a bar, choosing to keep her company.
51	12	"Goodbye Patrick"	Emma Freeman	Jonathan Gavin	7 August 2013	1.057
Nina's last day at work sees her introduced to her replacement, Dr Elvis Kwan. In light of recent events, Nina is OK with not having a baby shower but Dr Clegg has other ideas. Billie still remains missing in action. Kate confesses her true feelings to Joseph. Geraldine meets the new lady in Phillip's life. In the midst of her happiness of becoming a mother, tragedy strikes Nina.
52	13	"The Bond Between Sisters"	Emma Freeman	Debra Oswald	14 August 2013	1.106
With Nina grieving, Jimmy and Mick go looking for Billie. Mick and Billie come to the same conclusion regarding their marriage. Dr Clegg shows Cherie how he has honoured her. Nina is overwhelmed with sadness over Patrick's gift for the baby. Nina & Billie choose to get away using an already scheduled stay at a posh hotel while the Proudmans decide to surprise Nina by setting up a new baby room. Nina finally gets some sleep but is interrupted when she goes into labour.

== Ratings ==
Episode	Title	Original airdate	Overnight Viewers	Consolidated Viewers	Nightly Rank	Adjusted Rank
1	"Outside of the Comfort Zone"	22 May 2013	0.868	1.017	12	7
2	"Second Chances"	29 May 2013	0.798	0.983	12	9
3	"Truth Time"	5 June 2013	0.737	0.933	12	9
4	"Keeping it in the Family"	12 June 2013	0.847	1.013	10	8
5	"The Things We Do for Love"	19 June 2013	0.770	0.911	13	10
6	"Difficulty"	26 June 2013	0.583	0.674	16	15
7	"Smoking Situations"	3 July 2013	0.696	0.837	18	12
8	"Freaking the Freak Out"	10 July 2013	0.711	0.873	10	8
9	"Numbing the Pain"	17 July 2013	0.625	0.789	16	12
10	"Matters of the Heart"	24 July 2013	0.723	0.894	14	10
11	"Dialing Up the Crazy"	31 July 2013	0.874	1.023	9	7
12	"Goodbye Patrick"	7 August 2013	1.057	1.202	4	4
13	"The Bond Between Sisters"	14 August 2013	1.106	1.244	3	2

Figures are OzTAM Data for the 5 City Metro areas. Overnight - Live broadcast and recordings viewed the same night. Consolidated - Live broadcast and recordings viewed within the following seven days.
