= Offspring season 3 =

Offspring
- Season 3
- DVD Cover Art
- No. of episodes: 13

Release
- Original network: Network Ten
- Original release: 18 April – 11 July 2012

Season chronology
- ← Previous; Season 2 Next → Season 4

The third season of Offspring, an Australian drama television series, began airing on 18 April 2012 on Network TEN. The season concluded after 13 episodes. Offspring is the story of the impossible loves of 30-something obstetrician Nina Proudman (Asher Keddie), and her fabulously messy family, as they navigate the chaos of modern life.

The season was released on DVD as a four disc set under the title of Offspring: The Complete Third Series on 1 August 2012.

== Cast ==
=== Regular ===
- Asher Keddie as Nina Proudman
- Kat Stewart as Billie Proudman
- Matthew Le Nevez as Patrick Reid
- Deborah Mailman as Cherie Butterfield
- Eddie Perfect as Mick Holland
- Richard Davies as Jimmy Proudman
- Linda Cropper as Geraldine Proudman
- and John Waters as Darcy Proudman

=== Recurring ===
- Jane Harber as Zara Perkich
- Alicia Gardiner as Kim Akerholt
- Lachy Hulme as Martin Clegg
- Kate Atkinson as Renee
- Henry and Jude Schimizzi Peart as Ray Proudman
- Dan Spielman as Andrew Holland
- Kate Jenkinson as Kate Reid
- Matt Dyktynski as Tim
- Jack Heanly as Ollie Harding
- Kick Gurry as Adam

=== Guest starring ===
- Alison Bell as Louise

=== Special guest starring ===
- Gary McDonald as Phillip Noonan
- Clare Bowditch as Rosanna Harding

== Episodes ==
No. overall	No. in season	Title	Directed by	Written by	Original release date	Australian viewers (millions)
27	1	"Happiness is a Delusion"	Kate Dennis	Debra Oswald	18 April 2012	0.728
Nina is currently happy with both her relationship and her life. Jimmy and Zara discuss their coming baby. Billie and Mick decide to make another attempt at getting pregnant. During a double date, Billie reveals to Nina and Patrick that they're trying again. While at the restaurant, Nina receives a call from Jimmy that her apartment is on fire. Nina's apartment is destroyed, apart from some items Jimmy saves. Later, back at the Proudman house, Cherie tells Nina that, according to blood-typing, Darcy cannot be her father. Nina confronts Geraldine. When Billie and Jimmy arrive in the midst of the argument, all three siblings discover the truth of Nina's parentage. Darcy then arrives — then, upon learning the news, he leaves in shock. Nina and Patrick go back to his apartment.
28	2	"Secrets and Lies"	Kate Dennis	Tommy Murphy & Jonathan Gavin	25 April 2012	0.759
Still reeling from the revelation of her parentage, Nina meets with Darcy to find out how he's coping. Both hurt and confused by the news, Nina and Darcy downplay their feelings, trying to save each other grief. Nina, Billie and Jimmy are floored when Geraldine reveals all the secrets she's kept over the years, and Nina learns her biological father could be one of two men. Billie struggles with the idea that Nina is only her half-sister. Unable to censor herself, she creates chaos for Darcy and Geraldine before sharing her concerns with Nina, who reaffirms their bond. Under Billie's instructions, Mick tries to find Andrew a date.
29	3	"Fertility Woes"	Kate Dennis	Michael Lucas	2 May 2012	0.629
Burying concerns over the identity of her biological father, Nina focuses on the hunt for a rental property with Patrick. But she's forced to confront the issue when Billie reveals she located one of the possibilities. Billie's disappointed to discover her only fertile time of the month coincides with Tim and Andrew's first big date. Striking a compromise, Billie suggests Andrew keep things on third base with Tim and save himself to donate the following afternoon. Jimmy and Zara attend the first ultrasound for their baby.
30	4	"Time"	Shirley Barrett	Christine Bartlett	9 May 2012	0.785
Billie is asked to speak at a conference in New Zealand. Mick is down in the dumps after his song rewrite gets rejected, but cheers up when Tim tells him about a new opportunity. Patrick has a run-in with the father of a baby he and Nina just delivered. Darcy and Geraldine show up at Nina and Patrick's with housewarming gifts. Nina gets a surprise call from Dr Noonan, who's hoping to catch up with Geraldine now that she's single. Feeling the weight of her massive secret, Nina realises she has to tell Dr Noonan that he's her father. Nina and Patrick discuss having children together.
31	5	"Allegations"	Shirley Barrett	Jonathan Gavin	16 May 2012	0.774
Trying to bond, Nina and Dr Noonan have dinner together but it results in the need for ice. Jimmy walks in on a private Skype call between Billie and Mick. Darcy visits Dr Noonan, only to find out he's being followed by Geraldine. Tim accepts a once-in-a-lifetime career opportunity, which may come at the expense of his budding relationship with Andrew. Jimmy and Zara continue to debate whether they're a couple or not. Mick is introduced to Rosanna but both have issues working with one another. Nina finds out the couple whose baby she recently delivered has lodged a complaint against Patrick regarding administering an epidural against their wishes. Patrick decides to deal with the matter by staying at a motel, shutting out Nina and thwarting her willingness to help him.
32	6	"Partners in Crisis"	Elissa Down	Debra Oswald	23 May 2012	0.726
Worried about their first big fight and fearing a breakup is imminent, Nina finds Patrick at work to apologise. Darcy and Geraldine are less than enthusiastic by Zara's attitude toward her baby. Rosanna invites Mick over to her house to continue their musical partnership, and he meets her son, Ollie. Mick & Rosanna perform at Union Club Hotel Pub, bringing Tim and Andrew to make an important decision together. Andrew and Mick say their goodbyes. Geraldine sees Dr Noonan about her condition, then comes to Nina's aid.
33	7	"Drink, Drank, Drunk"	Elissa Down	Michael Lucas	30 May 2012	0.867
Proud of the way she's coped post-breakup, Nina arrives at work ready to face her first full day working with Patrick. Patrick is so tormented by the situation that he considers working elsewhere. Jimmy tries video as a way to market Mick & Rosanna. Rocket goes missing. Nina copes by taking in a movie with Darcy but runs into Dr Noonan at the theatre. Determined not to wallow, Nina lets Cherie, Zara, Kim and Renee take her out for a night of fun and partying.
34	8	"One Night Stand Off"	Emma Freeman	Ben Chessell & Michael Lucas	6 June 2012	0.930
Nina wakes up hung over in a stranger's bed, and finds herself in a humiliating situation. With Nina missing from work and home, Patrick's concern leads him to investigate. Nina heads home, slowly piecing together the events of the previous night, then finds herself locked out. Geraldine organizes a family get-together to see Mick and Rosanna perform. She also invites Dr Noonan. Zara goes into premature labour.
35	9	"Chaos"	Emma Freeman	Jonathan Gavin	13 June 2012	0.865
Jimmy stays by Zara's side, much to her annoyance. Nina tries to assure Patrick that her relationship with Adam is platonic. Zara gives birth, with Nina performing the caesarian section.
36	10	"The Aftermath"	Ben Chessell	Leon Ford	20 June 2012	0.906
Nina wakes up, unsure of what she's done. Billie finally returns home. Zara struggles emotionally after giving birth, and refuses to go see the baby. Adam finds Nina missing for their arranged get-together, entertaining Billie instead. Nina winds up taking an injured Patrick to the hospital. After Jimmy tries all the names he can think of, Zara names the baby.
37	11	"Goodbye is Always Hard"	Ben Chessell	Michael Lucas	27 June 2012	0.918
Patrick's last day at St Francis has Kate seeing Dr Noonan in a plan to get them back together. Billie goes over the top to host the perfect dinner for Rosanna and Ollie. Mick is touched when Ollie presents him with a thoughtful gift. Zara is adamant of wanting to live on her own with the baby rather than accept Geraldine's invitation to live with them. Cherie tells Darcy of her desire to have another child. Nina visits Adam to address the fallout between them. Zara puts everything in perspective for the Proudmans. Nina struggles to say a proper goodbye to Patrick in front of all her workmates at his good-bye party.
38	12	"Insecurity"	Kate Dennis	Jonathan Gavin	4 July 2012	0.894
Nina is caught trying to draw her own blood. Zara & Jimmy get some time for themselves. Dr Clegg attempts taking the next step with Cherie. Geraldine and Darcy trade the latest (upsetting) news regarding their lives. Mick gets bad news from Rosanna. Ollie spends the day with Billie. Cherie and Darcy try to recreate their cruise experience. Patrick confronts Nina about her latest behaviour. Nina asks Dr Noonan for a favour. Zara & Jimmy get devastating news regarding Alfie.
39	13	"Pregnant Pause"	Kate Dennis	Debra Oswald	11 July 2012	1.086
Nina's 35th birthday is at the center of a lot of surprises: Nina realizes she isn't pregnant after all, Dr Noonan overcompensates for all of Nina's birthdays he's missed, Darcy has a do-over party based on Nina's 8th birthday, Billie goes against her fears regarding Rosanna, Zara and Jimmy get good news, Cherie updates Dr Clegg on Ray's sibling situation, Patrick and Nina confess their innermost feelings over their breakup and having a baby in front of the whole family. Dr Noonan breaks the unexpected news regarding Nina's blood test result.

== Reception ==
=== Ratings ===
Episode	Title	Original airdate	Viewers	Nightly Rank
1	"Happiness is a Delusion"	18 April 2012	0.728	13
2	"Secrets and Lies"	25 April 2012	0.759	15
3	"Fertility Woes"	2 May 2012	0.629	17
4	"Time"	9 May 2012	0.785	12
5	"Allegations"	16 May 2012	0.774	14
6	"Partners in Crisis"	23 May 2012	0.726	13
7	"Drink, Drank, Drunk"	30 May 2012	0.867	12
8	"One Night Stand Off"	6 June 2012	0.930	10
9	"Chaos"	13 June 2012	0.865	11
10	"The Aftermath"	20 June 2012	0.906	9
11	"Goodbye is Always Hard"	27 June 2012	0.918	8
12	"Insecurity"	4 July 2012	0.894	11
13	"Pregnant Pause"	11 July 2012	1.086	5
