= Offspring season 6 =

Offspring
- Season 6
- Season 6 Promotional Poster
- No. of episodes: 10

Release
- Original network: Network Ten
- Original release: 29 June – 14 September 2016

Season chronology
- ← Previous; Season 5 Next → Season 7

The sixth season of Offspring, an Australian drama television series, premiered on Network TEN on 29 June 2016.

== Production ==
On 3 October 2014, John Edwards confirmed that Offspring would not return for a sixth series in 2015, due to Ten's cost-cutting measures in its production division. On 30 August 2015, the Herald Sun reported that a sixth season of Offspring would be made - returning after a two-year hiatus.

On 20 September 2015, Ten confirmed that Offspring would return for a sixth season in 2016. Production for the series began on 25 April 2016 and ran through to June 2016. Series 6 premiered on 29 June 2016.

With the return of the series, creator Deb Oswald and long-term writer Michael Lucas announced that they weren't returning to the series for the sixth season. Jonathon Gavin, another long-term writer, has stepped into the place of head writer, citing that he always thought there was more to the Proudmans' story. Gavin stated, about the return of the series, "Deb [Oswald] said that she conceived Offspring as the opposite of those shows where there's a dead prostitute lying in a dumpster in the beginning of the episode. This is a show that's affirming of all the things that make life great: food, sex, love, family, babies, dogs. The things that make life meaningful are our relationships to other people, those tiny moments when you have a connection with another human being. Offspring is a celebration of that."

The show's return after almost two years fast-forwards 18 months past where season five ended. Nina has been in a relationship with Leo. Billie has been managing husband Mick's tour in the UK and youngest sibling Jimmy runs his busy Mexican taqueria while his wife Zara studies for a medical degree.

Of the new season, Kat Stewart stated, "There's a life-changing event that shifts the ground for everybody and it provides us with an opportunity to mine a bit deeper with the characters, in a way that you can't do with a movie, or a play, or a short-run series. We've got all this history, so we don't run out of material, we just mine deeper."

== Cast ==
=== Main ===
- Asher Keddie as Nina Proudman
- Kat Stewart as Billie Proudman
- Richard Davies as Jimmy Proudman
- Deborah Mailman as Cherie Butterfield
- Jane Harber as Zara Perkich Proudman
- Linda Cropper as Geraldine Proudman

=== Recurring ===
- Alicia Gardiner as Kim Akerholt
- Eddie Perfect as Mick Holland
- Lachy Hulme as Martin Clegg
- Lawrence Leung as Elvis Kwan
- Patrick Brammall as Leo Taylor
- Dan Wyllie as Angus Freeman
- T.J. Power as Will Bowen
- Sarah Peirse as Marjorie Van Dyke
- Shannon Berry as Brody Jordan
- Alexander England as Harry Crewe

=== Guest ===
- Matthew Le Nevez as Dr Patrick Reid
- Ido Drent as Dr Lawrence Pethbridge

== Episodes ==
No. overall	No. in season	Title	Directed by	Written by	Original release date	Australian viewers (millions)
66	1	"...Make Lemonade"	Emma Freeman	Jonathan Gavin	29 June 2016	0.959
The Proudmans' world is rocked 18 months after the events of Season 5 when Cherie reveals that Darcy has died of a heart attack on a cruise. Nina learns that Darcy was in the process of writing a will, and is shocked when she realises that the lawyer, Will, is Darcy's son and thus Billie's, Jimmy's and Ray's half-brother. Billie decides to leave Mick in London and return home for an extended period of time. Zara chooses to put off her medical exam, using Darcy's death as an excuse. Geraldine fights with her old friend Marjorie after learning the truth about Will and tries to sleep with Phil D'Arabont. Leo announces that he's seeing someone and a new doctor arrives. Lawrence and his partner Maddy welcome their first child which Nina delivers.
67	2	"Endings and Beginnings"	Emma Freeman	Leon Ford	6 July 2016	0.779
Nina is shocked to learn that Leo is leaving with his new girlfriend Claire, and, after a major fight concerning Patrick, they make up and bid each other adieu on good terms. After talking through her issues with Marjorie, Geraldine gets to the bottom of her affair with Darcy, finally putting her mind at ease. Jimmy reveals that Darcy had given him money to pay back his restaurant's bank loan. Will tries to get to the bottom of Jimmy's financial problems and offers to buy 70% of the taqueria. Dr Angus Freeman arrives at the hospital and his flirtatious nature with everyone, except for Nina, doesn't go unnoticed amongst the staff. Billie tries to play peacekeeper as the Proudman family continues to fall apart.
68	3	"Getting to Know You"	Shannon Murphy	Shirley Barrett	13 July 2016	0.742
Nina tells everyone she had a sexual dream about Martin and soon realizes she needs a release, so she gets to know St Francis' alleged "pantsman", Dr Angus Freeman, better and decides to go for a drink with him but ends up leaving with a different man. Billie invites Stacey's daughter Brody to stay at Nina's house but Nina is not happy about it. Jimmy spends quality time with Ray. Will tells Jimmy his offer still stands but Jimmy declines; eventually Jimmy sells the business for $150,000 and buys a caravan.
69	4	"Fallout"	Shannon Murphy	Alice Bell	20 July 2016	0.845
Nina must face the fallout of her date with Angus. Mick surprises Billie when he visits from London and try to make love but keep getting interrupted by the family. Will tells Nina that he bought Jimmy's business anonymously. Nina tells him he did the wrong thing and asks him if he can sell it. At a family dinner, Will tells Jimmy he bought and sold the business and wants to split the profits, but Jimmy is enraged with Will and kicks him out. Geraldine announces a trip to Amsterdam but instead secretly stays with Marjorie and expresses her feelings about the loss of Darcy.
70	5	"Breaking Point"	Peter Templeman	Christine Bartlett	27 July 2016	0.726
A video emerges online which causes controversy for St Francis and Nina is the one who must front the situation. Harry Crewe, a public relations crisis consultant, tells Nina she is appearing on The Project but matters get worse when the anchor ambushes Nina with another controversial video. Brody tells Mick that she is pregnant. Billie believes Mick has planned a surprise party for her 40th but he hasn't. With help from Jimmy he plans one in a short period of time. At the party, Billie eventually expresses her emotions of Darcy's death. Cherie proposes to Martin.
71	6	"A Present from the Past"	Peter Templeman	Jonathan Gavin	3 August 2016	0.783
Nina and the staff are horrified after a couple believe that their baby girl, who was born at the hospital, may have been switched with another by accident. The mother later discloses to Nina that the baby's father might not be the baby's father. After a DNA test the couple are identified as the baby's parents. Meanwhile, Kim and her partner Jess decide to have a baby and they want Jimmy as a sperm donor but he declines. Martin accepts Cherie's wedding proposal. Later Nina meets with Jodie, Patrick's ex-wife, who reveals to Nina that Patrick froze sperm and allows Nina to claim ownership of the donation so she may have more children with Patrick even after his death.
72	7	"Just Keep Swimming"	Emma Freeman	Leon Ford	24 August 2016	0.668
Nina ponders whether to keep Patrick's sperm or to dispose of it. In the meantime she starts receiving hormone treatment so she can harvest eggs to give to Billie but decides not to tell her. Martin and Cherie have their bucks and hens nights which Martin misses as, after revealing to Nina that he married a woman for convenience when he first arrived in Australia but never got divorced, he travels to take divorce papers to his wife and is surprised to find that she is now a man. Brody finds out she is further along in the pregnancy than she thought and no longer has the choice of termination, but, with the help of Billie, decides she will raise the child. Nina takes Harry with her on the bucks night.
73	8	"Sisters Aren't Doing It for Themselves"	Emma Freeman	Rachel Givney	31 August 2016	0.638
Nina decides to retrieve her eggs and have them inseminated with Patrick's sperm instead of giving them to Billie, but inadvertently tells Billie and Harry the truth whilst recovering from anaesthetic. Cherie has a moment of doubt on her wedding day, but after Martin reads his vows to her and they finally have (loud) sex just prior to the ceremony, they marry. Nina and Billie fall out over the revelations, and Harry walks away after calling Nina a disaster. Meanwhile, Geraldine decides not to introduce her new beau to the family. Zara gets drunk at the wedding. In order to apologise to Jimmy and become accepted as a Proudman, Will streaks naked at the wedding reception. After Jimmy accepts Will into the family the two streak together as brothers.
74	9	"Tried and Tested"	Daina Reid	Leon Ford	7 September 2016	0.594
Billie hosts a house warming party but things go astray. Geraldine invites her new boyfriend to the party but Marjorie isn't happy about them being together. Brody tells Nina and Billie she didn't tell her mum she was pregnant. Brody Finally tells Stacey who then pleads for Brody to come live with her and she does, leaving Billie by herself. Zara says she has failed her medical degree and tells Jimmy she wants to move out after she reveals she had sex with Dr Angus. Nina has mixed emotions when she is told none of her embryos were successful and her relationship with Harry is weakening.
75	10	"To the Best of My Ability"	Daina Reid	Jonathan Gavin	14 September 2016	0.810
Billie tries to move on after Brody leaves but must come to her aid when she returns to town in labour. Nina, Billie, and Geraldine help her give birth to her child. Nina struggles with the birth as the baby has lost oxygen due to the twisted umbilical cord. After the baby is born not breathing, Nina resuscitates it and reveals it to be a baby boy. Nina's and Harry's relationship is getting stronger but, after making love, Nina panics because she can't move on from Patrick. When Zoe destroys her pictures of herself and Patrick, Nina starts to realise she needs to let go of him and also to destroy his sperm in the process. Zara can't figure out anything in her life including if she wants to have a future with Jimmy but he doesn't want her to give up on them. Billie tries persistently to set up Will with her boss Kerry and after an awkward blind date, they admit they have feelings for each other. Martin and Cherie return from their honeymoon and reveal they are moving to the Northern Territory to work in an outback outreach program for a few months. Geraldine reveals she wants to have a park bench in Edinburgh Gardens in memory of Darcy but is denied. Marjorie surprises Geraldine with a park bench to put in the park with the help of family and friends. Geraldine scatters Darcy's ashes and everyone sings "Wild Thing", they get caught by the park ranger and all of them run away, except for Elvis who gets caught.

== Viewership ==
Episode	Title	Original airdate	Overnight Viewers	Nightly Rank	Consolidated Viewers	Adjusted Rank
1	...Make Lemonade	29 June 2016	0.959	6	1.087	3
2	Doctor Doctor	6 July 2016	0.779	9	0.886	6
3	Getting to Know You	13 July 2016	0.742	11	0.837	10
4	Fallout	20 July 2016	0.845	6	0.943	6
5	Breaking Point	27 July 2016	0.726	9	0.864	6
6	A Present from the Past	3 August 2016	0.783	9	0.944	6
7	Just Keep Swimming	24 August 2016	0.668	17	0.856	10
8	Sisters Aren't Doing It for Themselves	31 August 2016	0.638	17	0.825	12
9	Tried and Tested	7 September 2016	0.594	18	0.771	13
10	To the Best of My Ability	14 September 2016	0.810	9	0.958	3
