= Party Tricks =

Australian television series

- Season 1 DVD
- Genre: Drama; Romance; Political thriller
- Created by: Michael Lucas
- Directed by: Kate Dennis; Emma Freeman
- Starring: Asher Keddie; Rodger Corser; Angus Sampson; Adam Zwar; Ash Ricardo; Charlie Garber; Doris Younane; Colin Moody; Kaiya Jones; Oliver Ackland
- Composer: Bryony Marks
- Country of origin: Australia
- Original language: English
- No. of seasons: 1
- No. of episodes: 6

Production
- Executive producers: Rick Maier; Janeen Faithfull
- Producers: Michael Lucas; John Edwards; Imogen Banks
- Production locations: Melbourne, Australia
- Cinematography: John Brawley
- Editor: Dennis Haratzis
- Running time: 60 minutes
- Production company: Endemol Australia

Original release
- Network: Network Ten; Eleven (Catch-Up)
- Release: 6 October – 10 November 2014

Party Tricks was an Australian television political drama/comedy series starring Asher Keddie and Rodger Corser. It premiered on Network Ten on 6 October 2014 at 8:30pm.

On 3 October 2014 John Edwards confirmed that Party Tricks would not return for a second series in 2015, due to Ten's production division running out of money.

== Plot ==
Kate Ballard (Asher Keddie) is facing her first re-election as a State Premier. Her victory seems assured until the opposition suddenly announces a new candidate: David McLeod (Rodger Corser), a popular media personality with whom Kate had a secret, tumultuous affair several years ago. To the external audience, David and Kate present as compelling, evenly-matched adversaries, but a paranoid Kate fears that their complicated history will be used as a trump card. The show contains six episodes leading up to the election-night finale, portraying a cat-and-mouse game.

== Conception ==
On 26 July 2013, Network Ten announced a new drama project from Endemol Australia named Party Tricks, a six-part drama series by the producers of Offspring, Puberty Blues, The Secret Life of Us and Tangle; John Edwards and Imogen Banks.

Producer, Imogen Banks stated, "Politics, power and sex – what better elements for a big, juicy story? I cannot wait to make it. We're grateful to the country's politicians for living a reality that is far stranger than anything we could dream up. But it's our enormous pleasure to try."

== Production ==
Ten's head of drama, Rick Maier stated, "Imogen Banks and John Edwards have brought together the best of the best for this exciting new series, while Michael Lucas has created the perfect star vehicle for Asher and Rodger."

Filming for the first season began on 5 May 2014 and wrapped on 27 June 2014.

The six-part series produced by Imogen Banks and John Edwards for Endemol Australia and Network Ten with the assistance of Screen Australia and Film Victoria. It is created by Michael Lucas.

== Cast ==
- Asher Keddie as Kate Ballard, Labor Premier of Victoria and Member of Parliament for Richmond. Former Minister for Planning, Education, and Deputy Premier. Succeeded Rob Hutchens as Premier a year and a half prior to the start of the series.
- Rodger Corser as David McLeod, Victorian Liberal Party Leader, Liberal Candidate for Premier, and Candidate for Mount Waverley. Succeeded Neil Thorby as Leader of the Liberals in Victoria. Ultimately succeeds Ballard as Premier.
- Adam Zwar as Trevor Bailey, Deputy Leader of the Victorian Liberal Party and Interim Opposition Leader
- Angus Sampson as Wayne Duffy, Press Secretary and Spin Doctor to the Premier
- Colin Moody as Geoff Ballard, the Premier's Husband
- Kaiya Jones as Matilda McLeod, McLeod's Daughter
- Oliver Ackland as Tom Worland, State Political Reporter and Ollie's boyfriend
- Doris Younane as Paula Doumani, Deputy Premier and Minister for Transport
- Charlie Garber as Oliver 'Ollie' Parkham, the Premier's Speechwriter
- Ash Ricardo as Charlotte Wynn, Campaign Director for McLeod
- Ryan Powell as Shaggy Mycology
- Michala Banas as Tanya Keegan
- Thomas Campbell as Jonathan
- Neil Melville as Duncan Guthrie, former President of the Victorian Liberal Party
- Gareth Yuen as Lucas Fry, Liberal Party Volunteer
- Georgia Bolton as Kez, Kate's Security Detail
- Catherine Glavicic as Ann-Marie Dwyer

== Episodes ==
No.	Title	Directed by	Written by	Original release date	Australian viewers (millions)
1	"The Announcement"	Kate Dennis	Michael Lucas	6 October 2014	0.710
State Premier Kate Ballard is shocked when the Opposition reveals its new election candidate David McLeod. Unbeknown to the public, Kate and David share a secret past. Let the games begin.
2	"The Meeting"	Kate Dennis	Michael Lucas	13 October 2014	0.476
Petrified of the consequences of their secret coming out publicly, Kate stealthily enlists the help of her trusted speechwriter Ollie to organise a covert meeting with David.
3	"The Launch"	Kate Dennis	Christine Bartlett	20 October 2014	0.407
David's teenage daughter steps into the public eye and is caught in a scandal which triggers a media storm. Has his daughter destroyed David's unstoppable popularity and saved Kate's campaign?
4	"The Campaign Trail"	Emma Freeman	Michael Lucas	27 October 2014	0.467
As Kate's speechwriter Ollie is struggling to help Kate manage the situation with David, his partner Tom's actions could derail the entire campaign.
5	"The Debate"	Emma Freeman	Jonathan Gavin	3 November 2014	0.430
Kate is forced to come clean to husband Geoff about her secret past with David. Her confession will either jeopardise her marriage or ruin her chances of an election victory. Which will it be?
6	"The Election"	Emma Freeman	Michael Lucas	10 November 2014	0.530
Kate's team preps for the big day – Election Day, while across town the exposé and campaign have taken its toll on David. Who will concede defeat and who will lead Victoria in the next term?

== Ratings ==
Episode	Title	Original airdate	Overnight Viewers	Consolidated Viewers	Nightly Rank	Adjusted Rank
1-01	The Announcement	6 October 2014	0,710	0,806	14	12
1-02	The Meeting	13 October 2014	0,476	0,570	Not in Top 20	
1-03	The Launch	20 October 2014	0,407	0,484	Not in Top 20	
1-04	The Campaign Trail	27 October 2014	0,467		Not in Top 20	
1-05	The Debate	3 November 2014	0,430		Not in Top 20	
1-06	The Election	10 November 2014	0,530		Not in Top 20	

- Figures are OzTAM Data for the 5 City Metro areas.
- Overnight – Live broadcast and recordings viewed the same night.
- Consolidated – Live broadcast and recordings viewed within the following seven days.

== Awards and nominations ==
Year	Award	Category	Nominee	Result
2015	Logie Awards	Most Popular Personality on Australian Television	Asher Keddie	Nominated
2015	Logie Awards	Most Popular Actress	Asher Keddie	Won
