= List of Offspring episodes =

The following is a list of episodes for the Australian television programme, Offspring on Network Ten.

On 3 October 2014, John Edwards confirmed that Offspring would not return for a sixth series in 2015, due to cashflow issues resulting from Ten's cost-cutting measures in its production division. However on 20 September 2015, Ten confirmed that Offspring would return for a sixth season in 2016.

As of 30 August 2017, 85 episodes of Offspring have aired.

== Series overview ==
Season	Episodes	Originally released	
Season	Episodes	First released	Last released
Pilot		August 15, 2010	
1	13	22 August 2010	21 November 2010
2	13	16 May 2011	20 July 2011
3	13	18 April 2012	11 July 2012
4	13	22 May 2013	14 August 2013
5	13	14 May 2014	6 August 2014
6	10	29 June 2016	14 September 2016
7	10	28 June 2017	30 August 2017

== Episodes ==
=== Season 1 (2010) ===
No. overall	No. in season	Title	Directed by	Written by	Original release date	Australian viewers (millions)
Pilot	Pilot	"Pilot – Telemovie"	Kate Dennis	Debra Oswald	15 August 2010	1.124
1	1	"Taking Charge"	Kate Dennis	Debra Oswald	22 August 2010	1.084
2	2	"The Uncomfortability"	Darren Ashton	Jonathan Gavin	29 August 2010	1.122
3	3	"Playing Aloof"	Darren Ashton	Michael Lucas	5 September 2010	1.001
4	4	"Poison Ivy"	Sian & Jane Davies	Kylie Needham	12 September 2010	1.160
5	5	"Carpe Diem"	Sian & Jane Davies	Debra Oswald & Jonathan Gavin	19 September 2010	0.990
6	6	"D-Day"	Kate Dennis	Michael Lucas	26 September 2010	0.943
7	7	"Two Sisters"	Kate Dennis	Debra Oswald	3 October 2010	0.935
8	8	"Re-Unravel"	Glendyn Ivin	Jonathan Gavin	17 October 2010	0.831
9	9	"Making Peace"	Glendyn Ivin	Jonathan Gavin	24 October 2010	0.989
10	10	"The Other Woman"	Shirley Barrett	Debra Oswald	31 October 2010	0.952
11	11	"My Confessions"	Shirley Barrett	Michael Lucas	14 November 2010	0.908
12	12	"Not as Planned"	Kate Dennis	Jonathan Gavin	21 November 2010	0.929
13	13	"A New Miracle"	Kate Dennis	Debra Oswald	21 November 2010	0.860

=== Season 2 (2011) ===
No. overall	No. in season	Title	Directed by	Written by	Original release date	Australian viewers (millions)
14	1	"The Return"	Kate Dennis	Debra Oswald	16 May 2011	0.927
15	2	"Baby Bumps"	Kate Dennis	Michael Lucas	16 May 2011	0.760
16	3	"Dates, Decisions & Divorces"	Ken Cameron	Christine Bartlett	23 May 2011	0.905
17	4	"Together, We Are One"	Ken Cameron	Jonathan Gavin	30 May 2011	0.953
18	5	"The Way You Are"	Daina Reid	Ian Meadows	6 June 2011	0.954
19	6	"Behind Closed Doors"	Daina Reid	Michael Lucas	13 June 2011	0.982
20	7	"Cheating on Your Test"	Shirley Barrett	Debra Oswald	20 June 2011	0.995
21	8	"Two Different Places"	Shirley Barrett	Jonathan Gavin	22 June 2011	0.904
22	9	"Just Keep Talking"	Emma Freeman	Christine Bartlett	27 June 2011	0.938
23	10	"Acceptance"	Emma Freeman	Michael Lucas	29 June 2011	1.070
24	11	"Complications"	Kate Dennis	Tony McNamara	6 July 2011	0.825
25	12	"What Goes Around Comes Around"	Kate Dennis	Jonathan Gavin	13 July 2011	0.960
26	13	"Proudman Wedding Curse"	Kate Dennis	Debra Oswald	20 July 2011	0.997

=== Season 3 (2012) ===
No. overall	No. in season	Title	Directed by	Written by	Original release date	Australian viewers (millions)
27	1	"Happiness is a Delusion"	Kate Dennis	Debra Oswald	18 April 2012	0.728
28	2	"Secrets and Lies"	Kate Dennis	Tommy Murphy & Jonathan Gavin	25 April 2012	0.759
29	3	"Fertility Woes"	Kate Dennis	Michael Lucas	2 May 2012	0.629
30	4	"Time"	Shirley Barrett	Christine Bartlett	9 May 2012	0.785
31	5	"Allegations"	Shirley Barrett	Jonathan Gavin	16 May 2012	0.774
32	6	"Partners in Crisis"	Elissa Down	Debra Oswald	23 May 2012	0.726
33	7	"Drink, Drank, Drunk"	Elissa Down	Michael Lucas	30 May 2012	0.867
34	8	"One Night Stand Off"	Emma Freeman	Ben Chessell & Michael Lucas	6 June 2012	0.930
35	9	"Chaos"	Emma Freeman	Jonathan Gavin	13 June 2012	0.865
36	10	"The Aftermath"	Ben Chessell	Leon Ford	20 June 2012	0.906
37	11	"Goodbye is Always Hard"	Ben Chessell	Michael Lucas	27 June 2012	0.918
38	12	"Insecurity"	Kate Dennis	Jonathan Gavin	4 July 2012	0.894
39	13	"Pregnant Pause"	Kate Dennis	Debra Oswald	11 July 2012	1.086

=== Season 4 (2013) ===
No. overall	No. in season	Title	Directed by	Written by	Original release date	Australian viewers (millions)
40	1	"Outside of the Comfort Zone"	Emma Freeman	Debra Oswald	22 May 2013	0.868
41	2	"Second Chances"	Emma Freeman	Jonathan Gavin	29 May 2013	0.798
42	3	"Truth Time"	Emma Freeman	Christine Bartlett & Michael Lucas	5 June 2013	0.737
43	4	"Keeping it in the Family"	Shirley Barrett	Michael Lucas	12 June 2013	0.847
44	5	"The Things We Do for Love"	Shirley Barrett	Debra Oswald	19 June 2013	0.770
45	6	"Difficulty"	Ben Chessell	Samantha Strauss	26 June 2013	0.583
46	7	"Smoking Situations"	Ben Chessell	Leon Ford	3 July 2013	0.696
47	8	"Freaking the Freak Out"	Kate Dennis	Michael Lucas	10 July 2013	0.711
48	9	"Numbing the Pain"	Kate Dennis	Jonathan Gavin	17 July 2013	0.625
49	10	"Matters of the Heart"	Jennifer Perrott	Debra Oswald & Jonathan Gavin & Charlie Garber	24 July 2013	0.723
50	11	"Dialing Up the Crazy"	Jennifer Perrott	Michael Lucas	31 July 2013	0.874
51	12	"Goodbye Patrick"	Emma Freeman	Jonathan Gavin	7 August 2013	1.057
52	13	"The Bond Between Sisters"	Emma Freeman	Debra Oswald	14 August 2013	1.106

=== Season 5 (2014) ===
No. overall	No. in season	Title	Directed by	Written by	Original release date	Australian viewers (millions)
53	1	"Back in the Game"	Emma Freeman	Debra Oswald	14 May 2014	0.931
54	2	"When Sparks Fly"	Emma Freeman	Michael Lucas	21 May 2014	0.817
55	3	"Moving On"	Emma Freeman	Leon Ford	28 May 2014	0.766
56	4	"Winners and Losers"	Kate Dennis	Li-Kim Chuah	4 June 2014	0.828
57	5	"The Story of My Life"	Kate Dennis	Jonathan Gavin	11 June 2014	0.804
58	6	"Emergencies"	Wayne Blair	Michael Lucas	18 June 2014	0.823
59	7	"I'm Always Here"	Wayne Blair	Debra Oswald	25 June 2014	0.865
60	8	"Expect the Unexpected"	Daina Reid	Jonathan Gavin	2 July 2014	0.746
61	9	"Return, Romance, Repeat"	Daina Reid	Christine Bartlett	9 July 2014	0.738
62	10	"Introduction"	Peter Salmon	Leon Ford	16 July 2014	0.981
63	11	"Love, Pain and the Whole Damn Thing"	Peter Salmon	Michael Lucas	23 July 2014	0.905
64	12	"Life Changing Decisions"	Emma Freeman	Jonathan Gavin	30 July 2014	0.847
65	13	"When Life Gives You Lemons..."	Emma Freeman	Debra Oswald	6 August 2014	0.992

=== Season 6 (2016) ===
No. overall	No. in season	Title	Directed by	Written by	Original release date	Australian viewers (millions)
66	1	"...Make Lemonade"	Emma Freeman	Jonathan Gavin	29 June 2016	0.959
67	2	"Endings and Beginnings"	Emma Freeman	Leon Ford	6 July 2016	0.779
68	3	"Getting to Know You"	Shannon Murphy	Shirley Barrett	13 July 2016	0.742
69	4	"Fallout"	Shannon Murphy	Alice Bell	20 July 2016	0.845
70	5	"Breaking Point"	Peter Templeman	Christine Bartlett	27 July 2016	0.726
71	6	"A Present from the Past"	Peter Templeman	Jonathan Gavin	3 August 2016	0.783
72	7	"Just Keep Swimming"	Emma Freeman	Leon Ford	24 August 2016	0.668
73	8	"Sisters Aren't Doing It for Themselves"	Emma Freeman	Rachel Givney	31 August 2016	0.638
74	9	"Tried and Tested"	Daina Reid	Leon Ford	7 September 2016	0.594
75	10	"To the Best of My Ability"	Daina Reid	Jonathan Gavin	14 September 2016	0.810

=== Season 7 (2017) ===
No. overall	No. in season	Title	Directed by	Written by	Original release date	Australian viewers (millions)
76	1	"Happy Geraldine Day"	Shirley Barrett	Jonathan Gavin	28 June 2017	0.724
77	2	"The End of an Era"	Shirley Barrett	Leon Ford	5 July 2017	0.594
78	3	"Episode 3"	Matthew Moore	Christine Bartlett	12 July 2017	0.459
79	4	"Episode 4"	Matthew Moore	Alice Bell	19 July 2017	0.646
80	5	"Episode 5"	Ben Chessell	Leon Ford	26 July 2017	0.559
81	6	"Episode 6"	Ben Chessell	Claire Phillips	2 August 2017	0.559
82	7	"Episode 7"	Shannon Murphy	Christine Bartlett	9 August 2017	0.618
83	8	"Episode 8"	Shannon Murphy	Alice Bell	16 August 2017	0.556
84	9	"Episode 9"	Peter Salmon	Leon Ford	23 August 2017	0.568
85	10	"Episode 10"	Peter Salmon	Jonathan Gavin	30 August 2017	0.545

== Ratings ==
Offspring : AUS viewers per episode (thousands)

Season	Episode number												
Season	1	2	3	4	5	6	7	8	9	10	11	12	13
1	1084	1122	1001	1160	990	943	935	831	989	952	908	929	860
2	927	760	905	953	954	982	995	904	938	1070	825	960	997
3	728	759	629	785	774	726	867	930	865	906	918	894	1086
4	868	798	737	847	770	583	696	711	625	723	874	1057	1106
5	931	817	766	828	804	823	865	746	738	981	905	847	992
6	959	779	742	845	726	783	668	638	594	810	–		
7	724	594	459	646	559	559	618	556	568	545	–		

Source: Audience measurement performed by OzTam
