= Neil Melville =

Australian actor

- Born: 18 February 1953 (age 73); Sydney, New South Wales, Australia
- Occupations: actor; singer; producer; director
- Spouses: Debra Byrne (m. 1989 – d. 1997); Bo Melville (m. 16 October 1997 – present)

Neil Melville is an Australian actor.

== Early life ==
Melville was born in Sydney, but spent most of his childhood in Apollo Bay, Victoria. In the early 1970s he was lead singer of Geelong rock band 'SteamHammer'. Melville graduated from Adelaide's Flinders University with a Bachelor of Arts (Hons) in English Literature, Philosophy and Drama. He performed in a number of university productions, including, most notably, the world premiere of Jack Hibberd's The Les Darcy Show for the Adelaide Festival in 1974.

== Career ==
After graduating from university, Melville spent a year writing and performing for children with the Little Patch Children's Theatre. While with this group, he wrote the vaudeville-documentary, Australian Born, Australian Bred. He also worked with the South Australian Theatre Company and toured with The South Australian Arts Council.

Melville went on to serve as actor and director-in-residence at the University of Melbourne. While there, he secured roles in Crawford television series' Cop Shop, The Sullivans, Carson's Law and The Flying Doctors. He also worked in cabaret and theatre at John Pinder’s ‘Last Laugh Theatre Restaurant’ and Ralph Kerle’s ‘Flying Trapeze’. Neil created the highly successful Busking with Brel. He went on to perform in stage productions of Evita, Oklahoma! and Les Misérables.

Melville has acted extensively in television, including in series' such as Rafferty's Rules, A Country Practice, The Henderson Kids, Col’n Carpenter, Snowy, Phoenix, Janus, Ocean Girl, Snowy River: The McGregor Saga, Correlli, Flipper, Stingers, Blue Heelers, The Secret Life of Us, McLeod's Daughters, Underbelly, Jack Irish, Offspring, Wentworth, Playing for Keeps and Five Bedrooms. He has also appeared in films such as Brilliant Lies and Run Rabbit Run.

Melville is also an accomplished musician and worked as Executive Producer on ex-wife Debra Byrne's album, Heaven Down Here.

== Personal life ==
In 1987, Melville met fellow actor and singer Debra Byrne on the set of the Australian theatre production of Les Misérables. By June 1989 the couple were planning their wedding. Byrne and Melville separated in November 1996 and later divorced.

Melville met his current wife, Bo, a costume designer, while touring with Melbourne Theatre Company. They have been married since 1997 and live in Glenaire in the Otways on the Great Ocean Road, Victoria, while Melville continues to act.

== Theatre ==
Year	Title	Role	Notes	Ref
	The Fantasticks		The Space	
1974	The Les Darcy Show		Adelaide Festival – World premiere	
1976	Coriolanus		Playhouse, Adelaide with STCSA for Adelaide Festival	
1977	How the Other Half Loves		Arts Theatre, Adelaide with Adelaide Repertory Theatre	
1980–1981	Evita	Singer	Festival Theatre, Adelaide, Perth Entertainment Centre, Her Majesty's Theatre, Melbourne, Her Majesty's Theatre, Sydney	
1981	Busking with Brel	Actor & Singer	Nimrod Theatre, Sydney	
1982	Oklahoma!	Cord Elam	Festival Theatre, Adelaide, Theatre Royal, Sydney, Her Majesty's Theatre, Melbourne	
1983	Life of Galileo		SGIO Theatre, Brisbane with Queensland Theatre	
1983	Summer of the Seventeenth Doll		Anthill Theatre, Melbourne with Australian Nouveau Theatre	
1984	Odyssey of a Prostitute	Ray Le Sting / Uncle Charles	Church Theatre, Melbourne with Australian Contemporary Theatre Company	
1985	Blue Window	Tom	St Martins Theatre, Melbourne with Playbox Theatre Company	
1987	Les Misérables	Combeferre / Factory Foreman	Theatre Royal, Sydney	
1989	Les Misérables in Concert	Ensemble	The Domain, Sydney for Sydney Festival	
1990	This Old Man Comes Rolling Home	Snowy Baker / Violet / Child	Russell Street Theatre, Melbourne with MTC	
1996	Summer of the Seventeenth Doll		Theatre Royal, Hobart, Playhouse, Adelaide, Glen Street Theatre, Sydney, Newcastle Civic Theatre with MTC	
2015	West Side Story	Schrank	State Theatre, Melbourne with The Production Company	
	Othello			
	Macbeth			
	The Naked Vicar Show			
	On Our Selection			
	The Magic Guitar			
	The Ramayana			

== Filmography ==
=== Film ===
Year	Title	Role	Notes	Ref
1987	Bushfire Moon (aka Miracle Down Under)	Mr Potts	Feature film	
1987	Feathers	Bert	Feature film	
1995	The Feds: Terror	Don Gosper	TV movie	
1995	In Pursuit of Honor	Sean Quinlain	TV movie	
1996	Brilliant Lies	Vince	Feature film	
2006	Court of Lonely Royals			
2009	Saved	Nigel Weston	TV movie	
2010	Oranges and Sunshine	Monsignor	Feature film	
2010	Lifeboat		Short film	
2011	A Heartbeat Away	Tommy	Feature film	
2012	Jack Irish: Black Tide	Ricky Kirsch	TV movie	
2015	Pedal	Reg	Short film	
2016	Spirit of the Game	David McKay	Feature film	
2023	Jones Family Christmas	Brian Jones	TV movie	
2023	Fanciers	Barry	Short film	
2023	Run Rabbit Run	Albert	Feature film	

=== Television ===
Year	Title	Role	Notes	Ref
1979–1981	The Sullivans	Sgt Pauling / Lecherous Seaman	3 episodes	
1980	Cop Shop	Plain Clothes Cop	1 episode	
1981–1992	A Country Practice	Bruce / Martin / Olsen	5 episodes	
1982–1985	Prisoner	Mick Kirby / Phil Sutton	3 episodes	
1983	Carson's Law	Patrick McAvoy	2 episodes	
1985	The Fast Lane	Wallace	1 episode	
1985	The Henderson Kids	Barton	14 episodes	
1985–1992	Neighbours	Roy Riley / Jim Hawkins	5 episodes	
1986	Alice to Nowhere	Roy	Miniseries, 2 episodes	
1986	Studio 86		Miniseries, 1 episode	
1986	Whose Baby?	Jim	Miniseries, 1 episode	
1986	The Flying Doctors	Niall Robertson	1 episode	
1987	In Between	Doctor	1 episode	
1988	Rafferty's Rules	Banks	1 episode	
1990	Embassy	Phil Hartman	2 episodes	
1991	Col'n Carpenter	TV Repair Man	1 episode	
1992	Boys from the Bush	Ted	2 episodes	
1992	Good Vibrations	Jim	Miniseries, 2 episodes	
1993	Snowy River: The McGregor Saga	Jack Logan	13 episodes	
1993	Phoenix	Martin Schultz	2 episodes	
1994	Law of the Land	Terry Rankin	1 episode	
1994	Ocean Girl	Lambert	1 episode	
1994	Janus	Sergeant Morris	1 episode	
1994–2005	Blue Heelers	Kevin Sutton / Bob Crowley	6 episodes	
1995	Correlli	Jim Sanderson	Miniseries, 8 episodes	
1995	Snowy River: The Mcgregor Saga	Fergus Ross	1 episode	
1996	Flipper	Dr Hansen	1 episode	
1998–2001	Halifax f.p.	Phillip Parker / Jim Dettmann	2 episodes	
1999	Stingers	Gil Truman	1 episode	
2001	The Secret Life of Us	Male Doctor	1 episode	
2002	Something in the Air	Colin Lynch	1 episode	
2003	The Saddle Club	Mr Roth	2 episodes	
2004	McLeod's Daughters	Merv Richards	1 episode	
2008	The Hollowmen	Ian	12 episodes	
2008	Underbelly	Todd McDonald	6 episodes	
2009	City Homicide	Jack Ferguson	1 episode	
2011	Killing Time	Barry Edwards	Miniseries, 4 episodes	
2012	Rake	Keegan Wiley	1 episode	
2012	Howzat! Kerry Packer's War	Ray Steele	Miniseries, 2 episodes	
2013	Miss Fisher's Murder Mysteries	George Sanderson	3 episodes	
2014	Party Tricks	Duncan Guthrie	4 episodes	
2015	Utopia	Ken	1 episode	
2015	Wentworth	Brendan Maddock	1 episode	
2017	Offspring	Drew Crew	5 episodes	
2017	The Leftovers	Captain	1 episode	
2017	Newton's Law	Christopher Elvin	3 episodes	
2018	Jack Irish	Ricky Kirsch	5 episodes	
2018	Picnic at Hanging Rock	Mr Hussey	Miniseries, 5 episodes	
2019	Upright	Jim	1 episode	
2019	Playing for Keeps	Bob Macklevee	6 episodes	
2019–2022	Five Bedrooms	Roger Everely	2 episodes	
2021	Love Me	Arty	1 episode	
2021	Lie With Me	Ray Tucker	Miniseries, 4 episodes	
2021	Ms Fisher's Modern Murder Mysteries	Bill Steed	1 episode	

== Sources ==
- Stratton, David. "Brilliant Lies". Variety i2 (13–19 May 1996): 68
- Graeme Turner; Stuart Cunningham (2000). The Australian TV Book. Allen & Unwin Australia. ISBN 978-1-86508-014-7.
- Brilliant Lies
- Neil and Bo Melville at Apollo Bay
- Neil Melville at IMDb
