= Shane Emmett =

Australian actor and filmmaker

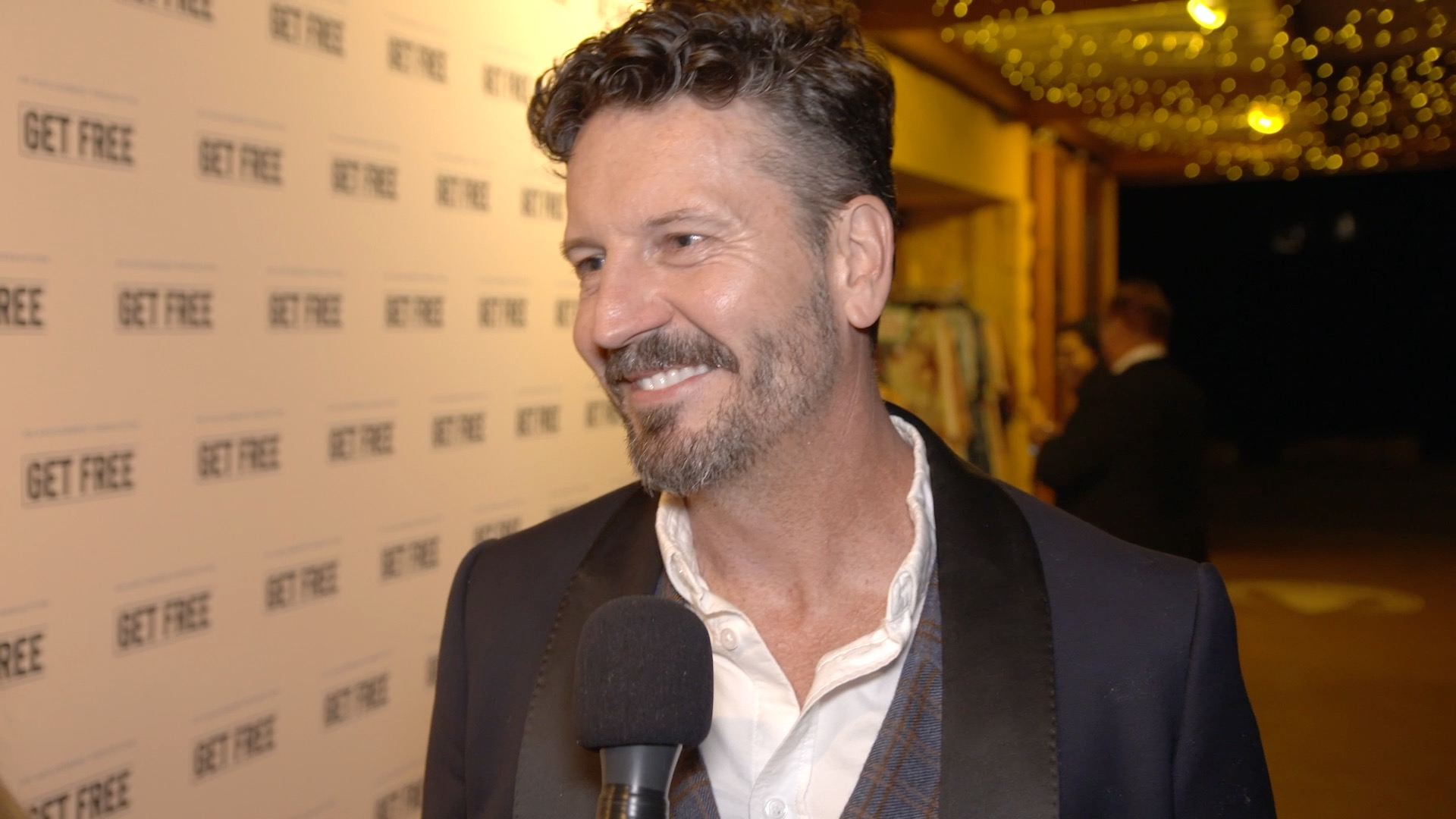
- Emmett in 2026
- Born: Gosford, New South Wales, Australia
- Education: St John The Baptist Primary School, Woy Woy; St Edward's Christian Brothers College; Corpus Christi College; Macquarie University
- Occupations: Actor; TV presenter Filmmaker/producer
- Years active: 1998–present
- Television: All Saints; Rush; Offspring; Home and Away; Power Games: The Packer-Murdoch War; 9am with David & Kim; Good Morning Australia; The Morning Show
- Relatives: Belinda Emmett (sister)

Shane Emmett is an Australian actor, presenter, and producer known for his work across film, television, and theatre. He has appeared in productions including the Emmy Award-winning Heartbreak High, Mr Inbetween, Nine Perfect Strangers, Total Control, Power Games: The Packer-Murdoch War, Offspring, Rush, and Home and Away. Emmett is also part of the cast of the upcoming Monsterverse film Godzilla x Kong: Supernova, scheduled for release in 2027.Alongside his acting career, Emmett has worked extensively as a television presenter, including hosting duties on 9am with David & Kim.

== Early life and education ==
Emmett was born in Gosford, NSW, and grew up in Umina Beach on the Central Coast.He attended St John The Baptist primary school in Woy Woy and St Edward's Christian Brothers College, and Corpus Christi College,before studying Communications at Macquarie University.

He is the younger brother of actress and singer Belinda Emmett.

== Career ==
=== Acting ===
Emmett first gained recognition in 2003 for his performance of the lead Frank Marlow in the musical Get Happy in Sydney. Emmett has also performed as Frank Sinatra in the musical From Here To Eternity, Marius in Les Misérables, Captain Von Trapp in The Sound of Music, Cinderella's Prince and the Wolf in Into the Woods, and Mitch Mahoney in The 25th Annual Putnam County Spelling Bee.

In 2006 he performed at the annual Carols in the Domain following the death of his sister, actress Belinda Emmett. He performed "One Sweet Day" accompanied by footage of Belinda singing behind him.

Emmett also acted on television, playing Aiden O'Hara in All Saints, Colin Lowndes in Rush, Dr Patrick in Offspring and Mark Gilmour in Home and Away. He portrayed the editor of The Australian Max Newton in the biographical miniseries Power Games: The Packer-Murdoch War and Clayton Timms in the Universal TV series Precinct 13.

In later television appearances, Emmett portrayed Constable Holden in Mr Inbetween, Andrew in the Emmy Award-winning Netflix reboot of Heartbreak High, and appeared in the Hulu miniseries Nine Perfect Strangers, opposite Nicole Kidman.

=== Presenting ===
Alongside his acting work, Emmett has worked extensively in live television and studio presenting. He hosted segments on 9am with David & Kim in 2012 and has appeared on Australian television programs including The Morning Show and Good Morning Australia.

According to his presenter biography with DR TV Talent, Emmett has worked extensively across Australian television as a presenter, MC, voice artist and live television host.

=== Producing and filmmaking ===
Emmett collaborated with filmmaker Jason van Genderen on several short films, including Mankind Is No Island, which won Best Film and the People's Choice Award at Tropfest New York in 2008. The film also won the Inside Film Award for Best Short Documentary. Emmett later produced the feature film Lost in the Crowd alongside Jason van Genderen, which won Best Feature at the 2021 MOMO Film Festival.

=== Awards and recognition ===
Emmett received a Best Actor nomination at the AACTA Awards in 2024.

He won Best Actor at Cineverse Film Festival Melbourne in 2025, and Best International Actor at the Move Me International Film Festival in Belgium.

He also received Best Actor nominations at Genre Celebration Film Festival in Tokyo and the AFIN International Film Festival in 2025.

From 2018, Emmett served as a jury member for the Asian Academy Creative Awards.

== Personal life ==
His sister was actress Belinda Emmett, who died in 2006.

Emmett divides his time between Australia and the United Kingdom. In 2026, he was granted a UK Global Talent Visa recognising his contribution to the screen industry.

== Filmography ==
=== Film ===
Year	Title	Role	Notes
2027	Godzilla x Kong: Supernova	TBA	Feature film
2024	Get Free	Jordan	Feature film
2022	18: The Book of Job	Eliphaz	Feature film
2022	6 Festivals	Festival Director	Feature film
2020	Lost in the Crowd	Producer	Documentary

=== Television ===
Year	Title	Role	Notes
2023	Strife	Supporting role	Television series
2022	Heartbreak High	Andrew	Television series
2021	Nine Perfect Strangers	Supporting role	Television miniseries
2021	Mr Inbetween	Constable Holden	Television series
2020	Total Control	Supporting role	Television series
2013	Power Games: The Packer-Murdoch War	Max Newton	Television miniseries
2000s	Home and Away	Mark Gilmour	Television series
