= Offspring (TV series) =

Australian comedy-drama television series

- Offspring title card
- Genre: Comedy drama
- Created by: Debra Oswald; John Edwards; Imogen Banks
- Starring: Asher Keddie; Kat Stewart; Don Hany; Deborah Mailman; Eddie Perfect; Linda Cropper; Richard Davies; Matthew Le Nevez; Lachy Hulme; John Waters; Jane Harber; Ido Drent; Ben Barrington; Patrick Brammall; Alexander England; Alicia Gardiner; TJ Power
- Narrated by: Asher Keddie
- Theme music composer: Thao & the Get Down Stay Down
- Opening theme: "When We Swam"
- Ending theme: "When We Swam" (instrumental)
- Composer: John Lee
- Country of origin: Australia
- Original language: English
- No. of series: 7
- No. of episodes: 85 (list of episodes)

Production
- Executive producers: Rick Maier; Rory Callaghan
- Producers: John Edwards; Imogen Banks
- Production locations: Melbourne, Victoria, Australia
- Camera setup: Nicholas Owens
- Running time: 45 minutes
- Production companies: Endemol Australia (Then branded as Southern Star Entertainment) (series 1–5); Endemol Shine Australia (series 6–7)

Original release
- Network: Network Ten
- Release: 15 August 2010 – 30 August 2017

Offspring is an Australian television comedy-drama program that aired on Network Ten from 2010 to 2017. Offspring is centred on 30-something obstetrician Nina Proudman and her family and friends as they navigate the chaos of modern life. Filmed in Melbourne's inner north, the series mixes conventional narrative drama and comedy with flashbacks, graphic animation, and fantasy sequences.

== Series overview ==
| Series | Episodes | Originally released | |
| Series | Episodes | First released | Last released |
|---|---|---|---|
| Pilot | | 15 August 2010 | |
| 1 | 13 | 22 August 2010 | 21 November 2010 |
| 2 | 13 | 16 May 2011 | 20 July 2011 |
| 3 | 13 | 18 April 2012 | 11 July 2012 |
| 4 | 13 | 22 May 2013 | 14 August 2013 |
| 5 | 13 | 14 May 2014 | 6 August 2014 |
| 6 | 10 | 29 June 2016 | 14 September 2016 |
| 7 | 10 | 28 June 2017 | 30 August 2017 |

== Cast ==
=== Main ===
| Actor | Character | Season | | | | | | |
| Actor | Character | 1 | 2 | 3 | 4 | 5 | 6 | 7 |
|---|---|---|---|---|---|---|---|---|
| Asher Keddie | Dr Nina Proudman | Main | Main | Main | Main | Main | Main | Main |
| Kat Stewart | Billie Proudman | Main | Main | Main | Main | Main | Main | Main |
| Deborah Mailman | Cherie Butterfield | Main | Main | Main | Main | Main | Main | Main |
| Richard Davies | Jimmy Proudman | Main | Main | Main | Main | Main | Main | Main |
| Linda Cropper | Geraldine Proudman | Main | Main | Main | Main | Main | Main | Main |
| Eddie Perfect | Mick Holland | Main | Main | Main | Main | Main | Recurring | |
| John Waters | Darcy Proudman | Main | Main | Main | Main | Recurring | | |
| Don Hany | Dr Chris Havel | Main | Guest | | | | | |
| Alicia Gardiner | Kim Akerholt | Recurring | Recurring | Recurring | Recurring | Recurring | Recurring | Main |
| Lachy Hulme | Dr Martin Clegg | Recurring | Recurring | Recurring | Main | Main | Recurring | |
| Jane Harber | Zara Perkich-Proudman | Recurring | Recurring | Recurring | Recurring | Main | Main | Main |
| Matthew Le Nevez | Dr Patrick Reid | | Main | Main | Main | Guest | Guest | |
| Ido Drent | Dr. Lawrence Pethbridge | | | | Recurring | Main | Guest | |
| Ben Barrington | Thomas Buchdahl | | | | | Main | | |
| Patrick Brammall | Leo Taylor | | | | | Main | Recurring | |
| Alexander England | Harry Crewe | | | | | | Recurring | Main |
| TJ Power | Will Bowen | | | | | | Recurring | Main |

=== Supporting cast ===
- Adrienne Pickering as Kirsty Crewe (Series 7)
- Neil Melville as Drew Crewe (Series 7)
- Dan Wyllie as Angus Freeman (Series 6)
- Sarah Peirse as Marjorie Van Dyke (Series 6–7)
- Shannon Berry as Brody Jordan (Series 6–7)
- Ash Ricardo as Kerry Green (Series 6–7)
- Cate Wolfe as Jess (Series 5–7)
- Isabella Monaghan as Zoe Proudman-Reid (Series 5–7)
- Maude Davey as Dr. Nadine Samir-Noonan (Series 2, 4–5)
- Celia Pacquola as Ange Navarro (Series 4–5)
- Garry McDonald as Phillip Noonan (Series 3–5)
- Clare Bowditch as Rosanna Harding (Series 3–5)
- Kate Jenkinson as Kate Reid (Series 2–4, 5)
- Christopher Morris as Brendan Wright (Series 1, 5)
- Lawrence Leung as Elvis Kwan (Series 4–7)
- Caren Pistorius as Eloise Ward (Series 4)
- Kevin Hofbauer as Joseph Green (Series 4)
- David Roberts as Phil D'Arabont (Series 2, 4, 5, 6)
- Kate Atkinson as Renee (Series 1–3)
- Kick Gurry as Adam (Series 3)
- Dan Spielman as Andrew Holland (Series 2–3)
- Emma Griffin as Tammy (Series 2)
- Jay Ryan as Fraser King (Series 2)
- Tina Bursill as Marilyn Holland (Series 2)
- Shane Emmett as Dr Patrick (Series 1)
- Leah de Niese as Odile (Series 1–2)
- Marta Kaczmarek as Sonja (Series 1)
- Kate Box as Alice Havel (Series 1)
- John Wood as Gareth (Series 1)
- Damon Herriman as Boyd Carlisle (Series 1)
- Matilda Brown
- Georgina Naidu as Linda Mason (Series 6)
- Danielle Carter as Margot Lee (Series 7)

== Production ==
Debra Oswald wrote the series with John Edwards and Imogen Banks producing with Southern Star Entertainment. Offspring was originally conceived as a two-hour telemovie for Ten, but was spun off into a 13-episode series after television executives were impressed by the quality of the telemovie. The second season began on 16 May 2011 with a double episode premiere.

On 3 October 2014, shortly after the fifth series finale aired, John Edwards confirmed that Offspring would not return for a sixth series due to Ten's cost-cutting measures in its production division. In 2015, the series was picked up for another series, with production commencing on 25 April 2016 and running through to June 2016. Most of the original cast returned alongside new cast members. The seventh series filmed in Melbourne from March 2017 and premiered on 28 June 2017.

In November 2017, Network Ten chose not to renew the show as part of its 2018 season, although did not officially cancel the program.

The series was filmed in Melbourne's inner-north around the suburb of Fitzroy and was produced by John Edwards and Imogen Banks, who also co-produced Tangle. John Edwards was responsible for such successes as Police Rescue, The Secret Life of Us, Love My Way, and Dangerous - also produced with Imogen Banks - and Rush for Seriously Ten.

== Offspring: The Nurses ==
A web series titled Offspring: The Nurses began in 2010 on the official Offspring website. It follows nurses Kim (Alicia Gardiner) and Zara (Jane Harber) from the original series, and also stars Benedict Hardie, Julia Grace, Laura Gilham, Carl Nilsson Polias, Jodie Sheehy, and Matthew Heyward as fellow staff members of the hospital. Some cast members from the original series have also starred as well.

A second web series follows Zara (Jane Harber), and this time Justina Noble as Nurse Tyra. Series 2 also starred Benedict Hardie, Harry Milas, Josh Price, Natalie Kaplan, Sonja Kowanjko, and Kate Hopkins, while Richard Davies and Lachy Hulme also made guest appearances.

== Awards and nominations ==
=== Australian Film Institute Awards ===
| Year | Nominee | Award | Result |
|---|---|---|---|
| 2010 | Deborah Mailman | Best Guest or Supporting Actress in a Television Drama | Won |
| 2010 | John Waters | Best Guest or Supporting Actor in a Television Drama | Nominated |

=== TV Week Logie Awards ===
| Year | Nominee | Award | Result |
|---|---|---|---|
| 2011 | Asher Keddie | Most Popular Actress | Won |
| 2011 | Offspring | Most Popular Drama Series | Nominated |
| 2011 | Don Hany | Most Popular Actor | Nominated |
| 2011 | Eddie Perfect | Most Popular New Male Talent | Nominated |
| 2011 | Richard Davies | Most Outstanding New Talent | Nominated |
| 2011 | Asher Keddie | Most Outstanding Actress | Nominated |
| 2011 | Kat Stewart | Most Outstanding Actress | Nominated |
| 2012 | Asher Keddie | Most Popular Actress | Won |
| 2012 | Asher Keddie | Gold Logie for Most Popular Personality on Australian TV | Nominated |
| 2012 | Eddie Perfect | Most Popular Actor | Nominated |
| 2012 | Offspring | Most Popular Drama Series | Nominated |
| 2012 | Kat Stewart | Most Outstanding Actress | Nominated |
| 2012 | Offspring | Most Outstanding Drama Series, Miniseries or Telemovie | Nominated |
| 2013 | Asher Keddie | Gold Logie for Most Popular Personality on Australian TV | Won |
| 2013 | Asher Keddie | Most Popular Actress | Won |
| 2013 | Matthew Le Nevez | Most Popular Actor | Nominated |
| 2013 | Clare Bowditch | Most Popular New Female Talent | Nominated |
| 2013 | Offspring | Most Popular Australian Drama | Nominated |
| 2013 | Offspring | Most Outstanding Drama Series | Nominated |
| 2014 | Asher Keddie | Gold Logie for Most Popular Personality on Australian TV | Nominated |
| 2014 | Asher Keddie | Most Popular Actress | Won |
| 2014 | Matthew Le Nevez | Most Popular Actor | Nominated |
| 2014 | Asher Keddie | Most Outstanding Actress | Won |
| 2014 | Kat Stewart | Most Outstanding Actress | Nominated |
| 2014 | Offspring | Most Popular Drama Program | Nominated |
| 2015 | Asher Keddie | Gold Logie for Most Popular Personality on Australian TV | Nominated |
| 2015 | Asher Keddie | Most Popular Actress | Won |
| 2015 | Offspring | Most Popular Drama Program | Nominated |

=== Equity Ensemble Awards ===
| Year | Category | Recipients and nominees | Result |
|---|---|---|---|
| 2013 | Outstanding Performance by an Ensemble in a Drama Series | Series 1 cast | Nominated |
| 2012 | Outstanding Performance by an Ensemble in a Drama Series | Series 2 cast | Nominated |
| 2013 | Outstanding Performance by an Ensemble in a Drama Series | Series 3 cast | Nominated |
| 2014 | Outstanding Performance by an Ensemble in a Drama Series | Series 4 cast | Nominated |

== Series viewership ==
| Season | # of Episodes | Season Premiere | Season Final | Average Audience (millions) | Drama Rank |
|---|---|---|---|---|---|
| 1 | 14 | 15 August 2010 | 21 November 2010 | 1.071 | #4 |
| 2 | 13 | 16 May 2011 | 20 July 2011 | 1.072 | #6 |
| 3 | 13 | 18 April 2012 | 11 July 2012 | 1.014 | #8 |
| 4 | 13 | 22 May 2013 | 14 August 2013 | 0.954 | #9 |
| 5 | 13 | 14 May 2014 | 6 August 2014 | 1.027 | #9 |
| 6 | 10 | 29 June 2016 | 14 September 2016 | 0.921 | #10 |

== DVD releases ==
The entire series of Offspring has been released on Region 4 DVD via Madman Entertainment. The first and second seasons were released in 2010 and 2011 respectively in box set packaging. In 2012, both sets received a re-release in standard-case packaging, which became the norm for each subsequent season set. Multiple season sets have additionally been made available from Madman Entertainment.

| DVD Title | # Episodes | # Discs | Release date | ACB rating | Notes | Ref |
| DVD Title | # Episodes | # Discs | Region 4 | ACB rating | Notes | Ref |
|---|---|---|---|---|---|---|
| The Complete First Season | 13 (+ Telemovie) | 5 | 1 December 2010 | M | Features: 725 minutes; 1.78:1 (16:9); Dolby Digital 2.0; Re-released in standard-case packaging (1 August 2012); Special features: Original feature-length telemovie; Offspring: The Nurses (Series 1 webisodes) | |
| The Complete Second Season | 13 | 4 | 14 September 2011 | M | Features: 616 minutes; 1.78:1 (16:9); Dolby Digital 2.0; Re-released in standard-case packaging (1 August 2012); Special features: Offspring: The Nurses (Series 2 webisodes) | |
| The Complete Third Season | 13 | 4 | 1 August 2012 | M | Features: 546 minutes; 1.78:1 (16:9); Dolby Digital 2.0 | |
| The Complete Fourth Season | 13 | 4 | 4 September 2013 | M | Features: 570 minutes; 1.78:1 (16:9); Dolby Digital 2.0 | |
| The Complete Fifth Season | 13 | 4 | 17 September 2014 | M | Features: 570 minutes; 1.78:1 (16:9); Dolby Digital 2.0 | |
| Season Six | 10 | 3 | 2 November 2016 | M | Features: 456 minutes; 1.78:1 (16:9); Dolby Digital 2.0 | |
| Season Seven | 10 | 3 | 8 November 2017 | M | Features: 439 minutes; 1.78:1 (16:9); Dolby Digital 2.0 | |

== International distribution ==
Offspring has been broadcast in several countries, including New Zealand, where it was screened from 2010 on TV One on Sundays at 8:30pm. In 2012, it appeared on the GNT network in Brazil and both HOT VOD and HOT3 in Israel, while it was included on Netflix in the United States in 2017. In 2011 it was picked up by Sony Entertainment Television in Spain, under the title "Descubriendo a Nina", AXN White in Portugal, as "Descobrindo Nina", and by the TLC network for Norway, Netherlands in July, Russia, screening on Sundays, and Sweden, where it was aired on Thursdays at 9:00pm, while in 2012, it debuted on RTÉ One and was available in Ireland in a late Sunday night time slot, 2013 on YLE TV2 in Finland Mondays at 10:05pm, and additionally, it appeared in the United Kingdom on Netflix in 2017.
