= Jane Harber =

Australian actress

- Born: November 12, 1985 (age 40); Melbourne
- Education: Wesley College, Melbourne
- Occupation: Actress
- Years active: 1996–present
- Known for: Offspring; The Moodys

Jane Harber is an Australian actress who is known for her role as Zara Proudman in the television series Offspring.

== Early life ==
Harber became involved in theatre while at high school, at Wesley College in Melbourne. At the age of 13, she toured South America and Thailand with Handspan Theatre. Her mother was a teacher.

== Career ==
=== Television and film ===
Harber's first television role was in 1997 biopic The Last of the Ryans. This was followed by a guest role in a 1997 episode of Blue Heelers, titled "Sisterly Love", in which she played a young girl called Chloe Bassetti.

She went on to play Bianca Nugent in long-running soap opera Neighbours, a role she played for three years. She also had a recurring role as Zdenka Milanovic in The Secret Life of Us and played Susie Money in the crime drama series Underbelly, girlfriend of Rodger Corser's character.

Following this, Harber furthered her craft by attending acting schools in New York and LA, before landing a role in the first season of comedy series Lowdown, playing Lucy.

In 2012, Harber starred as Cora Benson in the ABC comedy series A Moody Christmas. She reprised the role in The Moodys, a follow-up to A Moody Christmas. In 2013, she regularly appeared in The Elegant Gentleman's Guide to Knife Fighting, a sketch comedy show for the ABC. She also appeared as a special guest in an episode of the comedy game show SlideShow on the Seven Network.

In 2014, Harber played Michele Bennett, a former girlfriend of INXS lead singer, Michael Hutchence, in the TV miniseries INXS: Never Tear Us Apart.

Harber is probably best known for her role as midwife, Zara Proudman in seven seasons (86 episodes) of Offspring, the girlfriend of Jimmy Proudman (played by Richard Davies). She later co-wrote the 2017 Offspring spin-off web series, St Francis, in which she also starred.

Harber played Karen in the 2018 US Netflix TV movie, Pretty Little Stalker and, in 2020, she took a leading role in Nine Network crime miniseries, Informer 3838, a spin-off of the Underbelly franchise. That same year, she was a team captain in the TV panel show Show Me the Movie!, alongside Rove McManus and Joel Creasey.

In 2022, Harber appeared in ABC children's series MaveriX, playing the role of Tanya. The following year, she joined the cast of ABC drama miniseries In Limbo. opposite Ryan Corr and Bob Morley. In 2024, Harber joined the ABC drama The Family Next Door. The same year, she appeared in 2024 crime thriller feature film Sleeping Dogs alongside Russell Crowe.

In 2025, Harber joined the cast of UK/Australian co-commission miniseries Imposter, alongside fellow Neighbours alumnus Jackie Woodburne, Don Hany and Dannii Minogue, playing the role of Kate. She also recently appeared in NCIS: Sydney and four-part miniseries Reckless.

Harber's other guest television credits include playing Clara Whiting in Miss Fisher's Murder Mysteries, Georgina Rivers in House Husbands and social media influencer Coco in ABC comedy series Back in Very Small Business. She also appeared in ABC anthology series Summer Love and My Life Is Murder.

She has also undertaken voice work for numerous advertising campaigns, including Canva, Listerine, Grill’d, Olay, Samsung Galaxy, Binge and Specsavers. as well as narrating several audiobooks.

Harber has also worked on the other side of the camera, having collaborated with former Offspring co-star Kat Stewart and actor Diana Glenn to produce series The Elementals.

=== Theatre ===
Harber has also performed for the stage, including touring internationally as a young teenager in Four Little Girls for Handspan Theatre Company. She later played Alaura Kingsley in City of Angels at Melbourne's Fortyfivedownstairs.

In 2014, Harber had a lead role in the world premiere of The Speechmaker for Melbourne Theatre Company. In 2018, she appeared in a production of Gloria, once again for Melbourne Theatre Company, alongside Lisa McCune.

== Filmography ==
=== Television ===
Year	Title	Role	Notes
1997	The Last of the Ryans	Lyn Hughan	TV film
1997	Blue Heelers	Chloe Bassetti	Episode: "Sisterly Love"
1997–1998	Raw FM	Susan Mulholland	Episodes: "Light My Flame", "Playing with Fire", "One"
1999–2002	Neighbours	Bianca Nugent	Recurring role
2005	The Secret Life of Us	Zdenka Milanovic	Episodes: "The Big Leap", "The Treadmill"
2008	Underbelly	Susie Money	Recurring role
2010–2017	Offspring	Zara Perkich	Recurring role (series 1–4), main (series 5–7)
2010	Lowdown	Lucy / Joss	Episode: "Project Runaway"
2012	House Husbands	Georgina Rivers	Episode: "Trivia Night"
2012	A Moody Christmas	Cora Benson	Miniseries
2013	Miss Fisher's Murder Mysteries	Clara Whiting	Episode: "Framed for Murder"
2014	INXS: Never Tear Us Apart	Michele Bennett	Miniseries
2014	The Moodys	Cora Benson	Miniseries
2017	St Francis	Zara Perkich	Episodes 2–5
2018	Back in Very Small Business	Coco	Episodes: "By Design", "Bad Influence", "Litigating Circumstances", "Crossing the Line"
2018	Pretty Little Stalker	Karen	TV film
2019	My Life Is Murder	Chloe Angel	Episode: "Fake Empire"
2020	Informer 3838	Susan Reichert	Miniseries
2022	Summer Love	Caiti	Anthology series, episode 3
2022	MaveriX	Tanya	10 episodes
2023	In Limbo	Beth	6 episodes
2023	The Newsreader	Carla Carroll	Season 2, 2 episodes
2025	The Family Next Door	Lulu	Miniseries
2025	Reckless	Kate	Miniseries
2025	Imposter	Kate Templeton	Miniseries

=== Film ===
Year	Title	Role	Notes
2023	Foe	News Reporter	
2024	Sleeping Dogs	Catherine Finn	

== Theatre ==
Year	Title	Role	Notes	Ref.
1996–1997	Four Little Girls	Second Little Girl	Thailand Cultural Centre, VCA, Melbourne, Teatro National, Caracas, Venezuela with Handspan Theatre Company	
2006	City of Angels	Alaura Kingsley	Fortyfivedownstairs, Melbourne with Just Pretending	
2014	The Speechmaker	Sam	Playhouse, Melbourne with MTC / Working Dogs Productions	
2018	Gloria	Ani / Sasha / Callie	Southbank Theatre, Melbourne with MTC	
