= Richard Davies (Australian actor) =

Australian actor

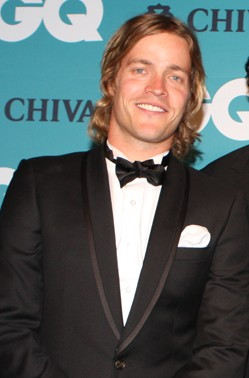
- Davies at the 2012 GQ Men of the year awards
- Born: 12 August; Australia
- Education: National Theatre Drama School (2005)
- Occupation: Actor
- Years active: 2008–present
- Known for: The Saddle Club; Bed of Roses; Offspring

Richard Davies is an Australian actor best known for his roles in television series, such as Offspring and The Saddle Club.

== Early life ==
In 2005, Davies graduated from the National Theatre Drama School. In his graduation productions he performed Wayne Shute in The Rivers of China, directed by Ken Boucher and Harry Bagley, and Cathy in Cloud 9, directed by Melanie Beddie.

== Acting career ==
Davies' first television roles were guests appearances in Neighbours and Satisfaction. After this, he played Max Regnary #2 on season 3 of The Saddle Club from September 2008 to April 2009. From 2008 to 2010, he had a recurring role in Bed of Roses as Rooster McIver.

Davies is best known for his role as Jimmy Proudman, the brother of main character Nina (played by Asher Keddie) in Network 10 drama Offspring, which he appeared in from 2010 to 2017. He has also had recurring roles in miniseries Howzat! Kerry Packer's War (2012) as David Hookes, Let's Talk About (2015) as Ben Gould, multi-award winning web series Bruce (2016), supernatural Netflix series Tidelands (2018) and Lucy and DiC (2019).

Davies starred in the short film Oxygen (2009) as well as playing the lead in the short film When the Wind Changes, which he also wrote and produced. Other film appearances include biographical TV film Beaconsfield (2012), documentary That Sugar Film (2014) and comedy crime drama The Mule (also 2014). Further films include family drama Oddball (2015) and thriller 2:22 (2017).

Davies' other television guest roles have been in Rush (2009), My Life is Murder (2019), Fisk (2021), Summer Love (2022) and The Newsreader (2023).

In 2025, Davies appeared as Ryan Jarvis in season three of RFDS.

== Personal life ==
In 2020, on his own birthday, Davies welcomed his first child, a son with partner Channelle Calderwood. Davies has been open about the fact that he struggles with obsessive–compulsive disorder (OCD).

== Filmography ==
=== Film ===
Year	Title	Role	Notes
2014	The Mule	Simon Rowland	
2014	That Sugar Film	Sugar Shopper	Documentary film
2014	Bound by Blue	Cole	
2015	Oddball	Jack Jones	
2016	2:22	Inky	
2017	That's Not Me	Jack Campbell	
2019	The Dustwalker	Luke	

=== Television ===
Year	Title	Role	Notes
1997	Look and Read	Guard	1 episode
2008	Neighbours	Nurse Peter Hart	1 episode
2008	Satisfaction	Trent Davis	2 episodes
2008–2009	The Saddle Club	Max Regnary	Series regular; 26 episodes
2008–2010	Bed of Roses	Rooster McIver	Recurring role; 10 episodes
2009	Rush	Jerrod	1 episode
2010	The Nurses	Jimmy	TV series
2010–2017	Offspring	Jimmy Proudman	Series regular; 86 episodes
2012	Beaconsfield	Daniel Piscioneri	Television film
2012	Howzat! Kerry Packer's War	David Hookes	2-part miniseries
2015	Let's Talk About	Ben Gould	10 episodes
2016	The Caravan	Jimmy Proudman	7 episodes
2016	Bruce	Bruce	7 episodes
2017	St Francis	Jimmy Proudman	5 episodes
2017–2018	True Story with Hamish & Andy	Scotty / Col	2 episodes
2018	Tidelands	Colton Raxter	Series regular
2019	My Life Is Murder	Tye Danzinger	1 episode
2019	Lucy and DiC	Young Johnathan	8 episodes
2020	Informer 3838	Kevin 'Juicy' Jucirovic	2 episodes
2020	Discover	Derek	1 episode
2021	Fisk	Brandon	1 episode
2021	Fraud Festival	Rick Hilton	Television film
2021	New Gold Mountain	Earle	Miniseries; 2 episodes
2021	Spreadsheet	Greg	2 episodes
2022	Summer Love	Craig	Anthology series; 1 episode
2023	The Newsreader	Glen Rickards	Episode: "A Model Daughter"
2024	Austin	Eric	3 episodes
2025	Apple Cider Vinegar	Sean	6 episodes
2025	RFDS	Ryan Jarvis	TV series
