= Alicia Gardiner =

Australian actress

- Years active: 1999-present
- Known for: Deadloch; Offspring
- Children: 2

Alicia Gardiner is an Australian television and theatre actress who is best known from her role on television series Offspring as Kim Akerholt. Gardiner is also known for her role as Cath in Deadloch.

== Early life ==
Gardiner studied at the Victorian College of the Arts.

== Career ==
=== Television ===
In addition to Offspring Gardiner's television roles include the series Last Man Standing, mini-series Queen Kat, Carmel and St. Jude, as well as Wolf Creek, Redfern Now, Kath And Kim and the children's television series Fergus McPhail and Noah & Saskia. Gardiner had most recently appeared in Wakefield and Rosehaven.

On 21 February 2023 it was announced that Gardiner was named as part of the cast for Prime series Deadloch in the role of Cath York. On 9 July 2024 it was announced that Deadloch was renewed for a second series with Gardiner reprising the role of Cath York. Gardiner also appeared in online series Buried.

=== Theatre ===
In 2001 and 2002, Gardiner was a member of the original Australian cast of Mamma Mia!, playing the role of 'Ali'. In 2017 and 2018, Gardiner played the role of 'Rosie' in the Australian tour of Mamma Mia!.

== Personal life ==
Gardiner has two children.

On 22 April 2026, Gardiner faced court on a charge of twisting the breast of a parliamentary worker during a scuffle at a pro-Palestine protest in 2024. The charge was dismissed, but Gardiner pled guilty to failure to leave a parliamentary precinct. She was fined for the failure to leave.

In May 2026, singer-songwriter Deborah Conway gave evidence to the Royal Commission on Anti-Semitism and Social Cohesion, saying that venues had received letters describing her as a "self-confessed Zionist and a supporter of genocide" and warning that platforming her would make them "complicit in genocide". Conway later named Gardiner as the actor she alleged had led the letter-writing campaign.

== Filmography ==
=== Film ===
| Year | Title | Role | Notes |
|---|---|---|---|
| 2015 | Downriver | Dana McCarthy | Film |
| 2013 | Courage | Shannon | Short film |
| 2012 | Jack Irish: Bad Debts | Sue McKillop | TV movie |
| 2004 | Loot | Laura Mantusi | TV movie |
| 2003 | After the Deluge | Nurse Aid | TV movie |

=== Television ===
| Year | Title | Role | Notes |
|---|---|---|---|
| 2024 | Darby and Joan | Gillian Novak | TV series: series 2 episode 2 |
| 2024 | Buried | Rita | 2 episodes |
| 2024 | Fam Time | Manager Tracey | 2 episodes |
| 2023 | The Clearing | Judith | TV miniseries, 1 episode |
| 2023–present | Deadloch | Cath York | TV series, 14 episodes |
| 2021 | Wakefield | Jennifer | TV miniseries, 6 episodes |
| 2020 | Rosehaven | Julie | TV series, 1 episode |
| 2019 | My Life Is Murder | Joanne Argus | TV series, 1 episode |
| 2019 | Get Krack!n | Kristen | TV series, 1 episode |
| 2017 | St Francis | Kim Akerholt | TV series, 5 episodes |
| 2016 | The Caravan | Kim Akerholt | TV series, 7 episodes |
| 2016 | Wolf Creek | Janine | TV series, 1 episode |
| 2014 | Four Quarters | | |
| 2013 | Miss Fisher's Murder Mysteries | Birdie Fowler | TV series, 1 episode |
| 2013 | Redfern Now | Brenda | TV series, 1 episode |
| 2010-17 | Offspring | Kim Akerholt | TV series, 86 episodes |
| 2010 | The Nurses | Nurse Kim | TV series |
| 2005 | Last Man Standing | Nurse Amelia Larkin | TV series, 5 episodes |
| 2004 | Kath & Kim | Guest | TV series, 1 episode |
| 2004 | Noah and Saskia | Theresa | TV series, 5 episodes |
| 2004 | Fergus McPhail | Mrs Crombie | TV series, 9 episodes |
| 2003 | The Secret Life of Us | Judy | TV series, 1 episode |
| 2002 | MDA | Nurse Jill | TV series, 1 episode |
| 2002 | Marshall Law | Fran | TV series, 1 episode |
| 2002 | Short Cuts | School Nurse | TV series, 1 episode |
| 2000 | Dogwoman A Grrrls best friend | Varna O'Halloran | TV series |
| 2000 | SeaChange | Secretary | TV series, 1 episode |
| 1999 | Halifax f.p. | Gemma Preston | TV series, 1 episode |
| 1999 | Queen Kat, Carmel & St Jude | Carmel McCaffey | TV miniseries, 4 episodes |

== Theatre ==
| Year | Title | Role | Venue |
|---|---|---|---|
| 2001-02 | Mamma Mia! | Ali | Princess Theatre Melbourne, Lyric Theatre Brisbane |
| 2002 | Love's the Best Doctor | | Chapel Off Chapel |
| 2003 | Open for Inspection | | La Mama |
| 2017-18 | Mamma Mia! | Rosie | Canberra Theatre, Lyric Theatre Brisbane, Capitol Theatre, Crown Theatre Perth, Princess Theatre Melbourne, Festival Theatre Adelaide |
