= Asher Keddie =

Australian actress (born 1974)

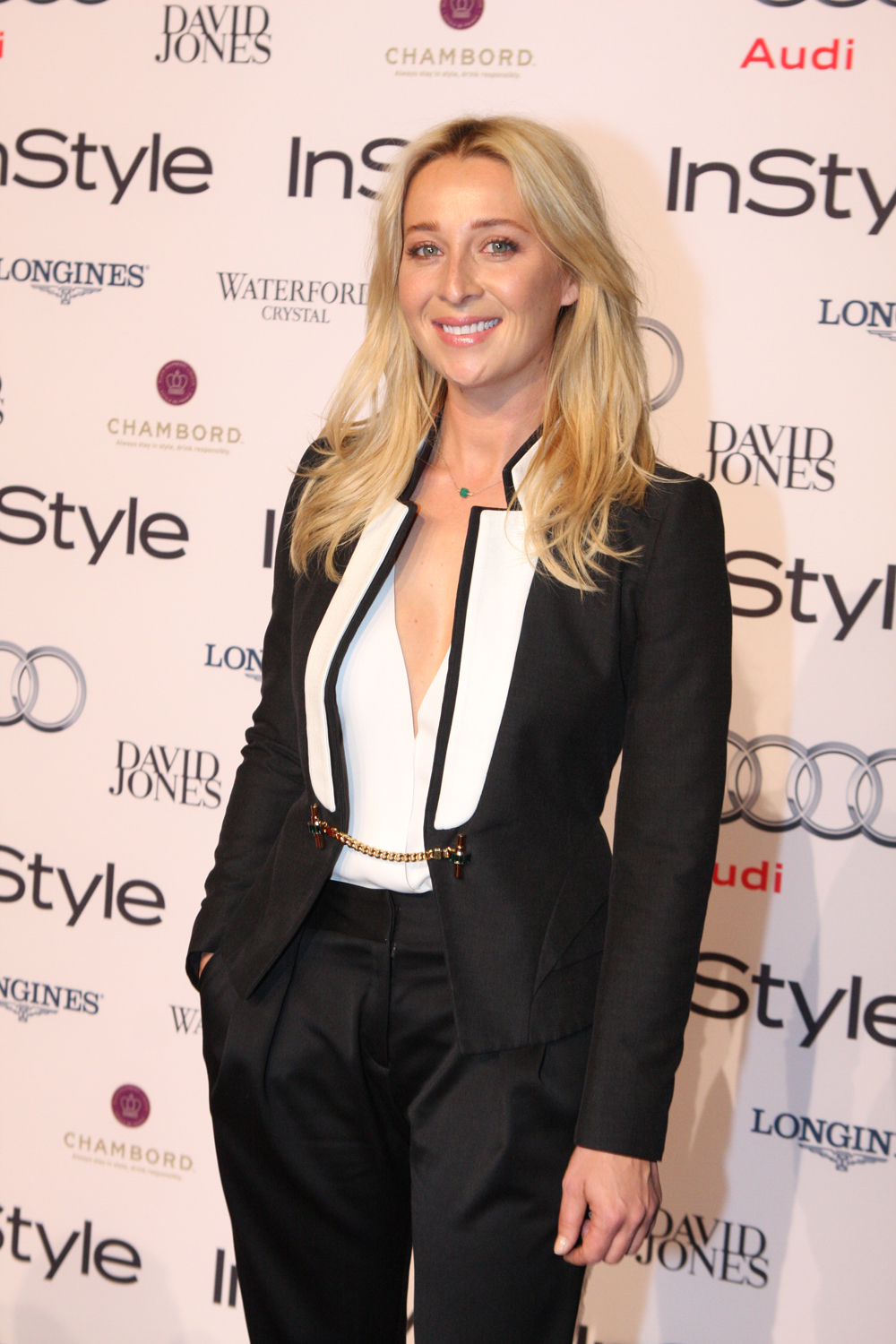
- Keddie in May 2012
- Born: 31 July 1974 (age 52); Melbourne, Victoria, Australia
- Education: St Michael's Grammar School
- Occupation: Actress
- Years active: 1984–present
- Spouses: Jay Bowen (m. 2007; div. 2011) Vincent Fantauzzo (m. 2014)
- Children: 1

Asher Keddie (born 31 July 1974) is an Australian actress. Beginning her career in the television series Five Mile Creek in the mid 1980s, Keddie received wide recognition for her role in the television series Offspring. Her significant repertoire in television has led to her being dubbed as the 'Golden Girl of Australian Television'. Keddie also had a small role in the film X-Men Origins: Wolverine, as Dr. Carol Frost. Aside from television and film work, she has several theatre credits, including in the Melbourne Theatre Company production of Les Liaisons dangereuses as Madame de Tourvel.

She won the Logie Award for Most Popular Actress five times in a row between 2011 and 2015. Keddie won the 2013 Gold Logie award for Most Popular Personality on Australian Television, for her role as Dr Nina Proudman in the Network Ten drama Offspring. She had previously been nominated twice for the award. Keddie has a total of seven Logie Awards.

== Early life ==
Keddie was born to Robi and James Keddie, both school teachers. As a child, she took dancing lessons for nine years and at age 14, she dislocated her knee prior to an audition at the Australian Ballet School. Despite her initial misfortune, she landed an acting gig in a dancewear ad while at ballet school and subsequently landed an agent. Keddie completed her secondary education at St Michael's Grammar School, St Kilda. In 2000 she scored a starring role as dancer in the music video, "Since I Left You" by the Avalanches, which by 2024 had been viewed 16 million times.

== Entertainment career ==
=== Television and film career ===
Keddie had guest roles early in her career in various television dramas, including her first roles in Five Mile Creek (1985), Fortress (1986) and Janus (1994). She played the role of Marriane Sheridan in Blue Heelers (season 3, episode 21) airing on 18 June 1996 and Good Guys, Bad Guys (1997). From 1997 to 1998, she came to the attention of senior network television producers, appearing in State Coroner. Following this, she had a recurring role in Stingers from 2000 to 2004.

Keddie's big break came in 2004, where she had a leading role in Love My Way, a drama series airing on Foxtel. The series ended in late 2007. This role led to Keddie being nominated for various awards for playing the part of Julia Jackson, a woman who struggles to cope with her own identity in the midst of family tragedy. Keddie's award win came at the end of Love My Way's third series in 2006.

In 2009, Keddie appeared in three different roles. She portrayed police officer Liz Cruickshank in the television drama Underbelly: A Tale of Two Cities and journalist Jacinta Burns, in the TV series Rush, as well as Dr Carol Frost in X-Men Origins: Wolverine.

In 2010, Keddie depicted author Blanche d'Alpuget in Hawke, a telemovie about the premiership of Bob Hawke (the Prime Minister of Australia, 1983–91). She also became the star of the drama series Offspring, which began airing in August 2010. In April 2011, she had the leading role of Ita Buttrose in ABC1's telemovie Paper Giants: The Birth of Cleo, the story of Buttrose's rise to success as the editor of Cleo magazine.

In 2014, Keddie starred in Party Tricks as Premier Kate Ballard. Ballard faces an election campaign alongside newly announced Opposition candidate David McLeod (Rodger Corser), with whom she once had a tumultuous affair.

In 2019, Keddie starred in the ABC1 acclaimed series "The Cry". In March 2020, she starred in a 6 part series on ABC1, "Stateless". The series also stars and is produced by Australian actress, Cate Blanchett and is set in a detention centre in the middle of the Australian outback.

In 2021, Keddie played Heather Marconi in the Nicole Kidman led Hulu series Nine Perfect Strangers alongside Melissa McCarthy, Samara Weaving and Bobby Cannavale.

In 2023, Keddie portrayed Evelyn Jones in Strife and in August 2024, it was announced she would be returning for a second season. On 31 August, Keddie was named in the cast of ABC series Plum. In 2024, Keddie was nominated for a Gold Logie during the 2024 Logie awards.

=== Stage ===
Making her theatre debut for the Melbourne Theatre Company in 1998 in Patrick Marber's Closer, Keddie went on to appear in Cyrano de Bergerac, Les Liaisons dangereuses, Birthrights, Great Expectations, The Seagull and Hannie Rayson's Life After George. Her performances in the 2005 Melbourne Theatre Company production of Les Liaisons dangereuses, and the Playbox's The Ishmael Club, both earned her Green Room Award nominations.

In 2007 Keddie starred alongside Jay Bowen in the Melbourne Theatre Company's play The Glass Soldier written by Hannie Rayson.

== Personal life ==
Keddie married actor and musician Jay Bowen in January 2007. The pair separated in December 2011. In April 2014, she married artist Vincent Fantauzzo. On 19 November 2014 she announced at the GQ Men's Award that she was pregnant. On 1 March 2015, their first child was born.

== Filmography ==
=== Film ===
Year	Title	Role	Notes
1985	Fortress	Sue	Film based on a novel by Gabrielle Lord
1988	Two Brothers Running	Ruthie Bornstein	Film
1993	The Feds: Deadfall	Susan Lehman	TV film
1997	The Devil Game	Karin	TV film
1999	Redball	Girl #2	Film
2003	Roy Hollsdotter Live	Cate	TV film
2006	The Society Murders	Prue Reed	TV film
2006	Phase	Ione	TV film
2007	Curtin	Elsie Curtin Jnr	TV film
2007	Murder in the Outback	Anne Barnett	TV film
2009	X-Men Origins: Wolverine	Dr. Carol Frost	Film
2009	Possession(s)	Selina	Film
2010	Hawke	Blanche d'Alpuget	TV film
2018	Swinging Safari	Gale Marsh	Film
2019	Dark Whispers Vol 1	Zoe	Film
2020	Rams	Angela	Film

=== Television ===
Year	Title	Role	Notes	Ref
1985	Five Mile Creek	Emma	Episode: Possum	
1985	Glass Babies	Anna Simpson	Miniseries	
1985	Palace of Dreams	Young Girl (uncredited)	Miniseries	
1986	The Last Frontier	Emma Hannon	Miniseries	
1988	Dusty		Miniseries	
1993	Snowy	Young Girl	Episode: Dams, Schemes & Damn Schemes	
1994	Janus	Lisa	Episodes: Without Prejudice, Burden of Proof, Improper Influences	
1996	Law of the Land	Shannon Rayner	Episode: Leader of the Pack	
1996–2003	Blue Heelers	Marriane Sheridan/Kelly Lonsdale/Lee-Anne Rheinberger	4 episodes	
1997	Good Guys, Bad Guys	Aimee	Episode: The Sound of One Hand Killing	
1997	Simone de Beauvoir's Babies	Karla (aged 17)	Miniseries	
1997–1998	State Coroner	Claire Ferrari	Main cast (15 episodes)	
1998	Halifax F.P.	Mandy Bailey	Episode: Isn’t It Romantic	
2000–2004	Stingers	Samantha Piper	7 episodes	
2002	The Secret Life of Us	Melissa	Episode: "From Little Things Big Things Grow"	
2002	MDA	Rachel O'Connor	Episode: "1.6"	
2004–2007	Love My Way	Julia Jackson	Main cast (30 episodes)	
2005	Last Man Standing	Jemima	Episode: "1.6"	
2006	Two Twisted	Sarah	Episode: "A Date with Doctor D"	
2009	Underbelly: A Tale of Two Cities	Detective Liz Cruickshank	Main cast (13 episodes)	
2009	Rush	Jacinta Burns	7 episodes	
2010–2017	Offspring	Nina Proudman	Main role (86 episodes)	
2010	Satisfaction	Ruby O'Kane	Episode: "Bug Crush"	
2011	Paper Giants: The Birth of Cleo	Ita Buttrose	Miniseries	
2013	It's A Date	Verity	Episode: "1.3"	
2014	Party Tricks	Kate Ballard	6 episodes	
2018	The Cry	Alexandra	Miniseries: 4 episodes	
2019	The Hunting	Simone	Miniseries: 4 episodes	
2020	Stateless	Claire Kowitz	6 episodes	
2021	Nine Perfect Strangers	Heather Marconi	8 episodes	
2023	The Lost Flowers of Alice Hart	Sally	Miniseries	
2023–present	Strife	Evelyn Jones	8 episodes; also producer	
2024	Fake	Birdie Bell	8 episodes; also producer	
2024	Plum	Renee Lum	TV series 5 episodes	

== Awards and nominations ==
Year	Award	Category	Result	Work
2005	Logie Award	Most Outstanding Actress	Nominated	Love My Way
2005	ASTRA Award	Most Outstanding Performance by an Actor – Female	Nominated	Love My Way
2006	Australian Film Institute Awards	Best Lead Actress in Television Drama	Nominated	Love My Way
2006	Logie Award	Most Outstanding Actress	Nominated	Love My Way
2006	ASTRA Award	Most Outstanding Performance by an Actor – Female	Nominated	Love My Way
2007	ASTRA Award	Most Outstanding Performance by an Actor – Female	Won	Love My Way
2007	Logie Award	Most Outstanding Actress	Nominated	Love My Way
2008	Logie Award	Most Outstanding Actress	Nominated	Love My Way
2008	ASTRA Award	Most Outstanding Performance by an Actor – Female	Nominated	Love My Way
2009	Australian Film Institute Awards	Best Lead Actress in Television Drama	Nominated	Underbelly: A Tale of Two Cities
2010	Logie Award	Most Outstanding Actress	Nominated	Underbelly: A Tale of Two Cities
2010	Australian Film Institute Awards	Best Supporting Actress in Television Drama	Nominated	Hawke
2011	Gold Logie		Nominated	Offspring and Hawke
2011	Logie Award	Most Popular Actress	Won	Offspring
2011	Logie Award	Most Outstanding Actress	Nominated	Offspring
2011	Equity Awards	Outstanding Performance by an Ensemble in a Comedy Series (Shared with castmates)	Nominated	Offspring
2012	Equity Awards	Outstanding Performance by an Ensemble in a Comedy Series (Shared with castmates)	Nominated	Offspring
2012	Equity Awards	Outstanding Performance by an Ensemble in a Mini Series or Telemovie (Shared with castmates)	Nominated	Paper Giants: The Birth of Cleo
2012	AACTA Awards	Audience Award for Best Performance	Won	Paper Giants: The Birth of Cleo
2012	AACTA Awards	Best Lead Actress in Television Drama	Nominated	Paper Giants: The Birth of Cleo
2012	Logie Award	Most Outstanding Actress	Nominated	Paper Giants: The Birth of Cleo
2012	Gold Logie	Most Popular Personality on Australian Television	Nominated	Offspring and Paper Giants: The Birth of Cleo
2012	Logie Award	Most Popular Actress	Won	Offspring and Paper Giants: The Birth of Cleo
2013	Gold Logie	Most Popular Personality on Australian Television	Won	Offspring
2013	Logie Award	Most Popular Actress	Won	Offspring
2013	Equity Awards	Outstanding Performance by an Ensemble in a Comedy Series (Shared with castmates)	Nominated	Offspring
2014	Logie Award	Most Popular Actress	Won	Offspring
2014	Logie Award	Most Outstanding Actress	Won	Offspring
2015	Gold Logie	Most Popular Personality on Australian TV	Nominated	Offspring and Party Tricks
2015	Logie Award	Most Popular Actress	Won	Offspring and Party Tricks
2017	Logie Award	Best Actress	Nominated	Offspring
2018	Logie Award	Most Popular Actress	Nominated	Offspring
2019	Logie Award	Most Outstanding Supporting Actress Most Popular Actress	Nominated	The Cry
2024	Gold Logie	Most Popular Personality on Australian Television	Nominated	Strife
