= Judgement Day (Ash vs Evil Dead) =

- Ash vs Evil Dead episode
- Episode no.: Season 3 Episode 9
- Directed by: Rick Jacobson
- Written by: Rick Jacobson
- Cinematography by: Dave Garbett
- Editing by: Gary Hunt
- Original release date: April 22, 2018
- Running time: 28 minutes

Guest appearances
- Emelia Burns as Zoë; Chelsie Preston Crayford as Kaya; Antonio Marsh as Wheelchair Vet; Paul Harrop as Hunter; Shayne Blaikie as Bartender; Katrina Hobbs as Candace Barr

Episode chronology
← Previous "Rifting Apart"	Next → "The Mettle of Man"

"Judgement Day" is the ninth episode of the third season of the American comedy horror television series Ash vs Evil Dead, which serves as a continuation of the Evil Dead trilogy. It is the 29th overall episode of the series and was written and directed by executive producer Rick Jacobson. It originally aired on the premium channel Starz on April 22, 2018.

The series is set 30 years after the events of the Evil Dead trilogy, and follows Ash Williams, who now works at the "Value Stop" as a simple stock boy. Having spent his life not doing anything remarkable since the events of the trilogy, Ash will have to renounce his routine existence and become a hero once more by taking up arms and facing the titular Evil Dead. In the episode, Ash goes to confront Ruby, who is planning on unleashing the Evil Dead over the world.

According to Nielsen Media Research, the episode was seen by an estimated 0.130 million household viewers and gained a 0.05 ratings share among adults aged 18–49. The episode received extremely positive reviews from critics, who praised the action sequences, performances, closure for Ruby's story and ending.

== Plot ==
While Kaya in Kelly's body (Dana DeLorenzo) grabs Zoë (Emelia Burns), Ruby (Lucy Lawless) removes part of her skin to write a new page of the Necronomicon. After she attempts to escape, Kaya kills her by plunging her eyes.

Pablo (Ray Santiago) discovers that he can see through the eyes of the Necronomicon, finding that Kaya's possession is what prevented Kelly from passing the Rift and that she and Ruby are planning to hide their presence from the Dark Ones. While Ash (Bruce Campbell) goes to confront Ruby, Pablo heads to the hardware store, discovering that the Rift is open. The three Dark Ones enter the real world and briefly touch Pablo before sparing his life and leaving. He heads outside and discovers that Deadites are attacking the town. The Kandarian Demon arrives but ignores Pablo. The Demon reaches Ash's house to attack Brandy (Arielle Carver-O'Neill), forcing her to hide in the shed, where she is attacked by her possessed phone, who bites off her left thumb.

Before Ruby can finish the Necronomicon, she is interrupted by Ash. He tries to attack Ruby and Kaya, but is easily overpowered, with Ruby destroying his chainsaw. Before Kaya kills him, the Dark Ones enter the room and grab Ruby and Kaya's soul. They then bring back her original body (Chelsie Preston Crayford) and place her soul back, stopping her possession of Kelly's body. Ash takes Kelly's body, the Necronomicon and the Dagger out of the room. The Dark Ones retrieve Ruby's soul, turning her body into a skeleton. They notice that Ash has taken the book. As he drives away, he communicates with Pablo through the Necronomicon, only to discover that Deadites are taking over the town. Ash crashes his car into a bar, where the Dark Ones subdue him and take the book before vanishing. Ash, Pablo and Brandy then witness the ground open as a gigantic creature emerges.

== Production ==
=== Development ===
The episode was written and directed by executive producer Rick Jacobson. It was Jacobson's first writing credit and fifth directorial credit.

== Reception ==
=== Viewers ===
In its original American broadcast, "Judgement Day" was seen by an estimated 0.130 million household viewers and gained a 0.05 ratings share among adults aged 18–49, according to Nielsen Media Research. This means that 0.05 percent of all households with televisions watched the episode. This was a 26% decrease in viewership from the previous episode, which was watched by 0.175 million viewers with a 0.08 in the 18-49 demographics.

=== Critical reviews ===
"Judgement Day" received extremely positive reviews from critics. Michael Roffman of The A.V. Club gave the episode a "B" grade and wrote, "Looking back, different has been a fairly good look for the third season. Not all of it's landed but most of it's been entertaining. 'Judgement Day' keeps that trend alive by tinkering with all sorts of disturbing oddities, from the unforgiving body horror brought upon Zoë to the Drag Me to Hell-style wrath of the Dark Ones to Brandy's aforementioned cellular scuttle. None of these additions absolve the season from its bigger issues but they're at least enjoyable distractions as the table's being set for the grand finale."

Stephen Harber of Den of Geek gave the episode a perfect 5 star rating out of 5 and wrote, "As the penultimate episode of the ultimate Evil Dead TV series, 'Judgement Day' hits a lot of sweet spots. The stakes are higher than they've ever been, a major apocalypse looms, and the classic cabin is nowhere in sight. That's probably the most refreshing part for me, seeing as that was where the other two finales were set."

Steve Ford of TV Fanatic gave the episode a 4 star rating out of 5 and wrote, "This was by far one of the best episodes of such a short Season. It did a great job of setting up the final confrontation with the Dark Ones - and as always - Bruce Campbell added some memorable and hilarious quips. 'Judgement Day' was a thrilling installment that set up what's sure to be a fun and satisfying finale." Bryan Kristopowitz of 411Mania gave the episode an 8.5 out of 10 rating and wrote, "'Judgement Day' is the second to last episode of the series and manages to pack in plenty of plot to set up the finale. The evil Ruby is destroyed, but there's an even greater evil waiting in the wings."
