= Tales from the Rift =

- Ash vs Evil Dead episode
- Episode no.: Season 3 Episode 6
- Directed by: Regan Hall
- Written by: Aaron Lam
- Cinematography by: Dave Garbett
- Editing by: Gary Hunt
- Original release date: April 1, 2018
- Running time: 29 minutes

Guest appearances
- Emelia Burns as Zoë; Colin Moy as Marcus; Chelsie Preston Crayford as Kaya; Will Wallace as Gary

Episode chronology
← Previous "Baby Proof"	Next → "Twist and Shout"

"Tales from the Rift" is the sixth episode of the third season of the American comedy horror television series Ash vs Evil Dead, which serves as a continuation of the Evil Dead trilogy. It is the 26th overall episode of the series and was written by Aaron Lam, and directed by Regan Hall. It originally aired on the premium channel Starz on April 1, 2018.

The series is set 30 years after the events of the Evil Dead trilogy, and follows Ash Williams, who now works at the "Value Stop" as a simple stock boy. Having spent his life not doing anything remarkable since the events of the trilogy, Ash will have to renounce his routine existence and become a hero once more by taking up arms and facing the titular Evil Dead. In the episode, Ash meets other Knights of Sumeria, who want to know more about the missing pages of the Necronomicon. Meanwhile, Kelly alone decides to fight Ruby.

According to Nielsen Media Research, the episode was seen by an estimated 0.196 million household viewers and gained a 0.07 ratings share among adults aged 18–49. The episode received positive reviews from critics, who praised the action sequences and twist ending.

== Plot ==
Ruby (Lucy Lawless) stares as her spawn has grown even faster than anticipated. However, Kelly (Dana DeLorenzo) arrives at her house and shoots her for everything she did. Aware of her immortality, Kelly brought the Kandarian Dagger to kill her. They then engage in a brutal fight.

Ash (Bruce Campbell) and Brandy (Arielle Carver-O'Neill) return to Ash's house, where they are now in better terms. They are visited by a group of Knights of Sumeria led by Zoë (Emelia Burns), who want any information from him. Ash takes them to the hardware store to investigate the Sumerian writing on the wall, where they deduce Gary found a way to open a rift to the Deadlands, a dimension that connects the Earth to Hell. They are joined by Pablo (Ray Santiago), who claims to know the passages thanks to his visions. Pablo speaks the text, which opens the rift.

At Ruby's hideout, Kelly's determination is not enough to overcome Ruby. As a last stand, she charges at her but is stabbed with the dagger, eventually dying from her wounds. Warned by Kaya (Chelsie Preston Crayford) that the rift has been opened, she transfer Kaya's mind into Kelly's body to act as a vessel. Back at the cellar, one of the Knights, Marcus (Colin Moy), enters the rift and is brought back after a few seconds. Marcus reveals itself as a demon and kills some of the Knights to absorb them into him. With Zoë and Pablo fighting alongside him, Ash beheads Marcus with his chainsaw. He then tells Pablo that he must find a way to close the rift. He returns home to meet with Brandy, as well as Kelly, unaware of Kaya's possession. She hands him over the dagger.

== Production ==
=== Development ===
The episode was written by Aaron Lam, and directed by Regan Hall. It was Lam's second writing credit, and Hall's first directorial credit.

== Reception ==
=== Viewers ===
In its original American broadcast, "Tales from the Rift" was seen by an estimated 0.196 million household viewers and gained a 0.07 ratings share among adults aged 18–49, according to Nielsen Media Research. This means that 0.10 percent of all households with televisions watched the episode. This was a slight increase in viewership from the previous episode, which was watched by 0.179 million viewers with a 0.10 in the 18-49 demographics.

=== Critical reviews ===
"Tales from the Rift" received positive reviews from critics. Michael Roffman of The A.V. Club gave the episode a "B" grade and wrote, "Talk about great timing, right? A resurrection episode on the day Jesus H. Christ also returned from the grave. Kind of makes that long wait from October to February worth it in hindsight, huh? Eh, maybe not. To be fair, any episode of Ash Vs. Evil Dead would likely align well with Easter Sunday, if only because the conceit of the entire series is the idea that the dead will always come back to stalk Ash Williams. Having said that, it does feel a tad poetic that a hero like Kelly Maxwell would fall and rise again on what's ostensibly the most popular day for resurrection narratives."

Stephen Harber of Den of Geek gave the episode a 4.5 star rating out of 5 and wrote, "The real centerpiece of 'Tales From The Rift' is the fight between Kelly and Ruby, one that gets messy and painful for both parties fast. Ruby and Kelly have had a complicated relationship since the beginning, one that came very close to transforming into a surrogate familial bond. Kelly once looked up to her as a mentor of sorts, another strong female figure who had a sense of control in the insane, upside-down world of Ash Williams. Now she views her as a mortal enemy, especially after what she did to Pablo and Dalton (but mostly Pablo)."

Steve Ford of TV Fanatic gave the episode a 4 star rating out of 5 and wrote, "This was another fun half hour of entertainment. We were finally introduced to more Knights of Sumeria — even though their presence was short lived — and the fight with the Sumeria-fused demon was pretty wild. The whole situation with Kelly left a little to be desired but I'm hopeful that she can still be saved." Bryan Kristopowitz of 411Mania gave the episode a 9 out of 10 rating and wrote, "'Tales from the Rift' may be the most action packed episode yet of Ash vs. Evil Dead. It's definitely the most action packed this season, and that's saying something. The Kelly-Ruby brawl is exciting and heartbreaking, and the big Ash-Marcus monster fight is absolutely disgusting."
