= Twist and Shout (Ash vs Evil Dead) =

- Ash vs Evil Dead episode
- Episode no.: Season 3 Episode 7
- Directed by: Mark Beesley
- Written by: Caitlin Meares
- Cinematography by: Andrew McGeorge
- Editing by: Allanah Bazzard
- Original release date: April 8, 2018
- Running time: 29 minutes

Guest appearances
- Emelia Burns as Zoë; Tim Earl as Teen Boy; Grace Cullen as Teen Girl; Mikaela Ruegg as Gown Girl; Colin Garlick as Deputy Masters

Episode chronology
← Previous "Tales from the Rift"	Next → "Rifting Apart"

"Twist and Shout" is the seventh episode of the third season of the American comedy horror television series Ash vs Evil Dead, which serves as a continuation of the Evil Dead trilogy. It is the 27th overall episode of the series and was written by Caitlin Meares, and directed by Mark Beesley. It originally aired on the premium channel Starz on April 8, 2018.

The series is set 30 years after the events of the Evil Dead trilogy, and follows Ash Williams, who now works at the "Value Stop" as a simple stock boy. Having spent his life not doing anything remarkable since the events of the trilogy, Ash will have to renounce his routine existence and become a hero once more by taking up arms and facing the titular Evil Dead. In the episode, Ash accompanies Brandy to her school dance to confront Ruby, but Ruby plans to use her spawn to frame Ash.

According to Nielsen Media Research, the episode was seen by an estimated 0.136 million household viewers and gained a 0.06 ratings share among adults aged 18–49. The episode received positive reviews from critics, who praised the action sequences, revelations and ending, although some criticized the writing.

== Plot ==
Brandy (Arielle Carver-O'Neill) asks Ash (Bruce Campbell) for permission in attending a school dance. Ash initially refuses, but allows her to go so he can confront Ruby (Lucy Lawless) with the help of Kelly (Dana DeLorenzo), unaware that Kaya possessed her body. Meanwhile, Ruby's spawn has finally grown into its final form: Ash himself. The version, Rash, cuts his own hand and is told that he must pretend to be the original Ash.

At the cellar, Pablo (Ray Santiago) and Zoë (Emelia Burns) notice Kelly inside the rift. She informs him that Ruby killed her before their conversation is cut short, forcing Pablo to leave to warn Ash. At the school dance, as Ash sneaks into the school, Rash kills a couple in a hallway. Ash runs into him, recognizing him as Ruby's spawn. Rash flees just as a police officer arrives to arrest Ash. Meanwhile, Brandy talks to Ruby, who claims he faked her life to protect her as Ash is a demon. She allows her to leave her office, while she conspires with Kaya about breaking their trust.

Brandy runs into Rash, who happily admits to murdering a person, before scaring her off with his demon face. As she arrives at the dance, Rash appears and kills many of the students. While everyone flees, Pablo arrives at the school, where he runs into "Kelly". Noticing her behavior, Pablo headbutts her and holds her at gunpoint. Kaya takes the gun but runs out of bullets, which allows Pablo to escape. Back at the dance, the real Ash appears while Rash disappears. As part of her plan, Ruby plunges herself into Ash's chainsaw to "kill" herself and frame Ash. With her dying breath, she tells Brandy that she must stop Ash.

Running through the school, Pablo finds Rash. However, by touching him, realizes that he is not Ash, prompting Rash to attack him. Back at the dance, angered by Ruby's death, Brandy prepares to kill Ash with the Kandarian Dagger. However, she is unable to go through it and drops the dagger. Rash and Pablo enter the room as they fight, making Brandy see Ash's innocence. With his shotgun, Ash executes Rash. An enraged Ruby rises, shocking the school, condemning Ash. Ash prepares to finally kill her, when she throws the dagger at him. Brandy blocks it and is stabbed in the back, dying from her wounds. Ruby flees the school while Ash grieves for his daughter's death. Brandy wakes up in the Deadlands, in a version of her school, and flees when she sees a shadow approaching her.

== Production ==
=== Development ===
The episode was written by Caitlin Meares, and directed by Mark Beesley. It was Meares' first writing credit, and Beesley's fifth directorial credit.

== Reception ==
=== Viewers ===
In its original American broadcast, "Twist and Shout" was seen by an estimated 0.136 million household viewers and gained a 0.06 ratings share among adults aged 18–49, according to Nielsen Media Research. This means that 0.06 percent of all households with televisions watched the episode. This was a 31% decrease in viewership from the previous episode, which was watched by 0.196 million viewers with a 0.07 in the 18-49 demographics.

=== Critical reviews ===
"Twist and Shout" received positive reviews from critics. Michael Roffman of The A.V. Club gave the episode a "C+" grade and wrote, "Tonally, 'Twist and Shout' is as indecisive as Brandy, to the point where the gore even suffers and seems gratuitous. It's the furthest from Evil Dead the series has felt so far, coming off more like a meandering CW drama that's fueled by high-stakes action too serious to be funny. Granted, some these feelings may be circumstantial, seeing how a bunch of kids being sawed to pieces at school isn't something anyone wants to laugh about right now, but hey, that's never stopped the horror genre from priding itself in gleefully massacring sex-crazed teens."

Stephen Harber of Den of Geek gave the episode a 4 star rating out of 5 and wrote, "'Twist and Shout' is a great episode of AvED because it lives up to its name in more ways than one, referring to the dance event and the climactic way its plot maneuvers around itself. Revelations are made to certain members of the main cast and a major death occurs at its end, all of which once again change the course of this season’s story arc. With only three episode left in Ash's most addictive year yet, this is an impressive and frustrating turn of events."

Steve Ford of TV Fanatic gave the episode a 4.8 star rating out of 5 and wrote, "The much darker tone of this episode was a welcome change. You still had your typical moments of dark humor and one-liner gold from Campbell as per usual, but the recent shift in focus to the horror aspect of the series has been a nice change of pace." Bryan Kristopowitz of 411Mania gave the episode a 7.5 out of 10 rating and wrote, "'Twist and Shout' is a disappointment for what it doesn't have in it (again, no dueling chainsaws. That should happen every single time there's a chance it could happen), but it also ups the ante for Ash and the rest of the Ghostbeaters team."
