= Matt Whelan =

New Zealand actor and comedian (born 1985)

- Born: 1985 (age 40–41); Christchurch, New Zealand
- Occupations: Actor; comedian
- Years active: 2007–present
- Awards: 2010 – Best Performance by a Supporting Actor

Matt Whelan (born 1985) is a New Zealand actor and comedian. Whelan is known for his roles as Brad Caulfield in the New Zealand television comedy-drama programme Go Girls. He has also played Playboy founder Hugh Hefner in the Amazon Original series American Playboy: The Hugh Hefner Story. Whelan played DEA agent Van Ness in the third season of Netflix original series Narcos.

== Early life ==
Whelan was born to a primary school teacher mother and a high school teacher father. He was raised with his three siblings in Christchurch, Canterbury on the South Island of New Zealand. He attended Lincoln High School. He took up an offer to study at Hagley Theatre Company, fostering a love for acting. He had originally intended to pursue a career in radio production. Whelan is of Irish descent.

Whelan later graduated from Toi Whakaari: New Zealand Drama School, one of New Zealand's most prestigious drama schools located in Wellington. Completing a Bachelor of Performing Arts in acting in 2007, immediately upon graduating he joined the cast of Show of Hands, performing alongside Melanie Lynskey.

== Career ==
In 2008, he landed a recurring role as Brad Caulfield in the first season of TVNZ 2 comedy-drama series, Go Girls. He became a series regular from seasons 2-4. He won the Best Supporting Actor award for his performance at the 2010 New Zealand film and television awards.

In 2011, he starred alongside Michelle Ang in My Wedding and Other Secrets, a New Zealand romantic comedy film. In 2014, he starred as Zach, the male lead in a Silo Theatre production of Amy Herzog's Belleville.

In April 2017, it was revealed Whelan would be playing the role as Playboy founder, Hugh Hefner, in the 2017 Amazon original docu-series, American Playboy: The Hugh Hefner Story. The ten-episode series, chronicles the Playboy founder's life, the rise of the magazine and unveils never-before-seen footage from his private archives. Whelan met with Hefner during the filming of the show. It was released just before Hefner's 91st birthday and was partly filmed in Auckland.

After featuring in larger acting roles and gaining popularity playing Hefner in 2017, Whelan landed a role in the third season of Netflix original series, Narcos. Whelan played Daniel van Ness, a young DEA agent partnered with Chris Feistl (played by Michael Stahl-David), who go to Cali, Colombia after the death of Pablo Escobar under the order of Javier Peña (played by Pedro Pascal) in hopes of taking down the Cali Cartel.

In 2020, he starred alongside Rachel Lefevre in the New Zealand-Canadian television mystery drama series, The Sounds. In the same year he appeared in The Luminaries, a miniseries based on the Eleanor Catton novel of the same name.

In 2024, he began starring in A Remarkable Place to Die alongside Rebecca Gibney and Chelsie Preston Crayford. The Queenstown-set crime drama series, is a co-production between TVNZ and Australia's Nine Network. In the same year he starred in the Australian survival thriller film, We Bury the Dead. The Tasmania-set film premiered at the Adelaide Film Festival in November 2024.

== Personal life ==
He currently lives in Taranaki, in the west of New Zealand's North Island.

== Filmography ==
=== Film ===
Year	Title	Role	Notes
2007	Eagle vs Shark	Kissing Boy	
2008	Show of Hands	Matt	
2011	My Wedding and Other Secrets	James	
2012	The Most Fun You Can Have Dying	Michael	
2014	3 Mile Limit	Richard	
2015	25 April	John Persson	Narrated documentary
2017	Pork Pie	Noah	
2017	Gary of the Pacific	Nelson	
2023	The Tank	Ben	
2025	We Bury the Dead	Mitch	
2026	Pizza Movie	—N/a	Producer only
2026	Apex	Hunter	

=== Television ===
Year	Title	Role	Notes
2007–2008	My Story	Regan	
2009–2012	Go Girls	Brad Caulfield	49 episodes
2013	Top of the Lake	Little Shane	Episode: "No Goodbyes Thanks"
2014	Coverband	Alex	6 episodes
2016	Of Kings and Prophets	Mattiyahu	Episode: "Offerings of Blood"
2016	Stake Out	Salesman	Episode: "Salesmans"
2017	American Playboy: The Hugh Hefner Story	Hugh Hefner	10 episodes
2017	Narcos	Daniel van Ness	9 episodes
2018	Wanted	Alistair Poussin	2 episodes
2019	The Brokenwood Mysteries	Jack Rudd	Episode: "A Real Page Turner"
2020	The Luminaries	Cowell Devlin	6 episodes
2020	The Sounds	Tom Cabbott	Main role
2021	My Life Is Murder	Connor Farrow	Episode: "Wild Life"
2021–2023	Under the Vines	Ben	5 episodes
2023	The Gone	Mayor Ken Armstrong	6 episodes
2024–present	A Remarkable Place to Die	Simon Delaney	Series regular

=== Theatre ===
Year	Title	Role	Notes
2014	Belleville	Zach	Silo Theatre production by Amy Herzog

== Awards ==
- 2010 New Zealand film and television awards – Best Performance by a Supporting Actor – Go Girls
