= Unfinished Business (Ash vs Evil Dead) =

- Ash vs Evil Dead episode
- Episode no.: Season 3 Episode 4
- Directed by: Daniel Nettheim
- Written by: Nicki Paluga
- Cinematography by: Andrew McGeorge
- Editing by: Allanah Bazzard
- Original release date: March 18, 2018
- Running time: 29 minutes

Guest appearances
- Lee Majors as Brock Williams; Samantha Young as Natalie; Chelsie Preston Crayford as Kaya; Will Wallace as Gary; Ellie Gall as Rachel Manning

Episode chronology
| ← Previous "Apparently Dead" | Next → "Baby Proof" |

"Unfinished Business" is the fourth episode of the third season of the American comedy horror television series Ash vs Evil Dead, which serves as a continuation of the Evil Dead trilogy. It is the 24th overall episode of the series and was written by supervising producer Nicki Paluga, and directed by Daniel Nettheim. It originally aired on the premium channel Starz on March 18, 2018.

The series is set 30 years after the events of the Evil Dead trilogy, and follows Ash Williams, who now works at the "Value Stop" as a simple stock boy. Having spent his life not doing anything remarkable since the events of the trilogy, Ash will have to renounce his routine existence and become a hero once more by taking up arms and facing the titular Evil Dead. In the episode, Ash is taken by the ghost of his father to experience a memory for vital information.

According to Nielsen Media Research, the episode was seen by an estimated 0.179 million household viewers and gained a 0.06 ratings share among adults aged 18–49. The episode received positive reviews from critics, who praised the episode's narrative, revelations and make-up.

== Plot ==
As he chops his father's corpse, Ash (Bruce Campbell) is visited by Brock (Lee Majors), who appears as a ghost. Brock wants to explain the "secret" that he was about to tell him before his death. Kelly (Dana DeLorenzo) reaches the house with the dagger, but Ash and Brock already left.

Brandy (Arielle Carver-O'Neill) returns home and encounters Kelly. As they leave, they are attacked by Pablo (Ray Santiago), who has been possessed by the Kandarian Demon. Pablo bits Kelly in the leg to infect her, forcing them to hide in Ash's home trailer. As Pablo fails to get in, Brandy tends to Kelly's wound. Meanwhile, Brock takes Ash back to 2012 to experience one of his memories, where the past Brock was visited at the hardware store by a man named Gary (Will Wallace), who claimed to be a Knight of Sumeria and had the missing pages of the Necronomicon. The past Brock dismisses his claims and pushes him down the cellar, seemingly killing him.

Returning to the present, Ash and Brock see that Gary survived the fall but eventually died from starvation. Before dying, he wrote a Sumerian writing on the wall. Ash is attacked by a Deadite presence, which he kills and also waves goodbye to his father before he disappears. The Necronomicon alerts Ruby (Lucy Lawless) of a prophecy, which is foretold by the sorceress Kaya (Chelsie Preston Crayford), also being warned that a Rift would open with the new pages. She goes to the woods to retrieve the Deadite Dalton (Lindsay Farris), restoring him to his human state. She pushes him to reveal everything, with Dalton saying they have the dagger. To prevent himself from another resurrection, Dalton takes his gun and shoots himself in the head.

Ash arrives at Ruby's hideout to confront her, but finds the cuffed Natalie (Samantha Young) at her attic as well as Ruby's spawn, now more grown up. Ash tries to release her, but she warns him not to make noise to awaken the spawn. As Ash uses his mechanical hand to save her, it malfunctions and accidentally makes a noise that awakens the spawn. Ash brushes it off, until the spawn makes a superhuman screech that turns off the lights.

== Production ==
=== Development ===
The episode was written by supervising producer Nicki Paluga, and directed by Daniel Nettheim. It was Paluga's first writing credit, and Nettheim's first directorial credit.

== Reception ==
=== Viewers ===
In its original American broadcast, "Unfinished Business" was seen by an estimated 0.176 million household viewers and gained a 0.06 ratings share among adults aged 18–49, according to Nielsen Media Research. This means that 0.06 percent of all households with televisions watched the episode. This was a slight increase in viewership from the previous episode, which was watched by 0.160 million viewers with a 0.08 in the 18-49 demographics.

=== Critical reviews ===
"Unfinished Business" received positive reviews from critics. Michael Roffman of The A.V. Club gave the episode a "B" grade and wrote, "The series still finds itself creating the same knots the films did, namely in the way it draws out the narrative while paying respect to the past. Which is why you get an episode like 'Unfinished Business' every once in awhile, the type of clean-up chapter that not only clarifies previously outstanding elements but also greases the wheels to get things moving. Because by the end of this episode, things are starting to feel consistent again."

Stephen Harber of Den of Geek gave the episode a perfect 5 star rating out of 5 and wrote, "'Unfinished Business' is a condensed piece of television and another impressive achievement for Ash vs Evil Dead in general. I've reviewed this series from the very beginning, and never before have I felt the need to re-watch an episode to fully absorb and process. Never would I have thought that I'd have to, either."

Steve Ford of TV Fanatic gave the episode a 4 star rating out of 5 and wrote, "All in all, 'Unfinished Business' was a solid installment. We learned some crucial info pertaining to the Book of the Dead and got a chance to see Lee Majors back in action." Bryan Kristopowitz of 411Mania gave the episode an 8.5 out of 10 rating and wrote, "'Unfinished Business' is probably going to divide fans of the show as the whole 'Brock takes Ash back into the past to show him stuff' sequence is a little goofy, even for a show like Ash vs. Evil Dead. I loved it, as the dialogue between Bruce Campbell and Lee Majors is hilarious and it's a terrific showcase for the two performer's comedic chops."
