= Show of Hands (film) =

- Promotional poster
- Directed by: Anthony McCarten
- Written by: Anthony McCarten
- Produced by: Angela Littlejohn
- Starring: Melanie Lynskey; Craig Hall; Stephen Lovatt; Matt Whelan
- Cinematography: John Cavill
- Edited by: John Gilbert
- Music by: Don McGlashan
- Production company: Great Southern Films
- Distributed by: Rialto Distribution
- Release date: 13 November 2008 (limited)
- Running time: 99 minutes
- Country: New Zealand
- Language: English
- Box office: $50,995

Show of Hands is a 2008 New Zealand romantic comedy-drama film. Written and directed by Anthony McCarten, it stars Melanie Lynskey, Craig Hall, Stephen Lovatt, and Matt Whelan. Inspired by true events, the story concerns an endurance competition where the person who can keep their hand on a brand-new car the longest gets to keep it. Hands was released theatrically in New Zealand on 13 November 2008.

== Cast ==
- Melanie Lynskey as Jess
- Craig Hall as Tom Shrift
- Stephen Lovatt as Hatch
- Chelsie Preston Crayford as Betsy
- Matt Whelan as Matt
- Semu Filipo as Tayshawn
- William Johnson as Walter
- Mark Mitchinson as Alex Lee Lerner

== Premise ==
In a New Zealand suburb, a competition is staged: it requires entrants to place one hand on an up-for-grabs Land Rover, the eventual winner being the person who keeps it there the longest. Attracted to this gruelling contest are people from every walk of life—with disparate reasons for taking part—including salesman Tom (Craig Hall), who will do whatever it takes to win, and single mother Jess (Melanie Lynskey), a parking warden who needs the car for her disabled child; though her motives for winning take an unexpected turn when Tom rubs her up the wrong way.

== Production ==
Originally conceived as a television film, Show of Hands received funding to be released theatrically when Melanie Lynskey signed on to the project. Filming took place in New Plymouth, New Zealand, between November and December 2007, with principal photography lasting 24 days. The film was shot using HD Thomson Viper cameras.

== Release and reception ==
Show of Hands premiered at the Montreal World Film Festival on 28 August 2008. It was released theatrically in New Zealand on 13 November that same year.

The film received generally positive reviews, with critics commending its performances and editing.

== Accolades ==
- 2009 Qantas Film and Television Awards
  - Nominated: Best Film, Best Director, Best Actress (Lynskey)
