= April 25 (disambiguation) =

April 25 is a day of the year.

April 25 or 25 April may also refer to:

- Carnation Revolution, 1974 revolution in Portugal and its colonies
- April 25 Sports Club, North Korean sports club
- 25 April (film), 2015 film
- April 25 (Eastern Orthodox liturgics), day in the Eastern Orthodox liturgical calendar
- April 25th Bridge, suspension bridge in Lisbon, Portugal
- Liberation Day (Italy), national holiday in Italy on 25 April commemorating the liberation from Nazism
