= A Remarkable Place to Die =

New Zealand-Australian television series

- Genre: Crime drama
- Created by: Philly de Lacey
- Written by: John Banas; Philly de Lacey; Pip Hall; Dahnu Graham; Victoria Boult; Christopher Plank; Peter Gawler
- Directed by: Peter Burger; Caroline Bell Booth; Joshua Frizzell; Charlie Haskell; Emmett Skilton; Victoria Boult
- Starring: Chelsie Preston Crayford; Matt Whelan; Rebecca Gibney
- Opening theme: In Hell, I’ll Be Good Company
- Countries of origin: New Zealand; Australia
- Original language: English
- No. of series: 2
- No. of episodes: 10

Production
- Executive producers: Philly de Lacey; Henning Kamm; Sibylle Stellbrink
- Producers: Bridget Bourke; Charlie Haskell
- Running time: 90 mins

Original release
- Network: TVNZ 1 Nine Network
- Release: 3 November 2024 – present

A Remarkable Place to Die is a New Zealand-Australian crime drama series created by Philly de Lacey and written by Lacey and John Banas. It follows Detective Anais Mallory (Chelsie Preston Crayford) on the homicide beat in Queenstown and as she seeks answers about the recent deaths of her father and sister.

It was first broadcast in 2024 on TVNZ 1 in New Zealand and on the Nine Network in Australia. On 20 April 2025, the series was renewed for a second series. In November 2025, it was revealed that the second season will be expanded, with a 6-episode run.

The series debuted in 2025 on ZDF with the title Queenstown Murders: Zum Sterben schön, where it was dubbed in German.

The first series was shown in the UK on U&Drama in 2025, as eight 1-hour episodes (including commercial breaks) and repeated in that format in September 2026.

== Plot summary ==
Anais Mallory leaves behind her high-flying career as a homicide detective in Sydney to return to her hometown of Queenstown in the South Island of New Zealand, where she is reunited with her grief-stricken mother, Veronica, following the mysterious road accident death of Anais' sister, Lynne. As Anais works on new cases with Detective Delaney as a local detective, she also investigates matters surrounding the recent deaths of her father and sister, which she suspects may involve her former fiancé, Luke, now married to her former best friend, Maja.

== Cast ==
- Chelsie Preston Crayford as Anais Mallory, a detective who returns to her hometown of Queenstown
- Matt Whelan as Simon Delaney, Anais's detective colleague
- Rebecca Gibney as Veronica Mallory, Anais's mother
- Charles Jazz Terrier as Luke Staunton, former fiancé of Anais, Maja's husband
- Indiana Evans as Maja Staunton, an Australian, and Anais's former best friend and Luke's wife
- Alex Tarrant as Dr. Ihaka Cooper, a pathologist
- Tara Canton as Lynne Mallory, sister of Anais

=== Recurring ===
- Mark Mitchinson as Vernon Kincaid, a regional detective
- Michala Banas as Kylie Shorrock, a pyrotechnician
- Utsa Chatterjee as Dr Anjali Bali, a pathologist who is Ihaka's colleague

=== Guest cast ===
- Nathalie Boltt as Marijke Van Heusen, a wealthy expat from South Africa
- Mike Edward as Stus Van Heusen, Marijke's wealthy husband, also from South Africa

== Episodes ==
=== Season 1 ===
No. overall	No. in season	Title	Directed by	Written by	Original release date	Viewers
1	1	"Over the Edge"	Peter Burger	John Banas	3 November 2024	N/A
Detective Mallory's homecoming unravels a chilling mystery mirroring her past. Disturbing echoes force.
2	2	"Hard to Swallow"	Caroline Bell-Booth	John Banas	10 November 2024	N/A
While grappling with her own personal demons, Anais Mallory must solve a seemingly impossible locked-room murder.
3	3	"Out of the Blue"	Joshua Frizzell	John Banas	17 November 2024	N/A
When an innocent camper is crushed to death, Anais Mallory must solve an instant double homicide that has unsettling links with her own dark past.
4	4	"Public Displays of Affection"	Charlie Haskell	John Banas	24 November 2024	N/A
Anais Mallory finally unravels the secrets of her own dark past, despite having to solve an explosive murder, ignited by a powder keg of lust, jealousy, and ambition.

=== Season 2 ===
No. overall	No. in season	Title	Directed by	Written by	Original release date	Viewers
5	1	"A Very Cold Case"	Peter Burger	John Banas	13 September 2026	N/A
6	2	"Pistols at Dawn"	Emmett Skilton	John Banas, Pip Hall	20 September 2026	N/A
7	3	"Law and Lore"	Peter Burger	Dahnu Graham	27 September 2026	N/A
8	4	"Leporiphobia"	Victoria Boult	John Banas, Victoria Boult, Christopher Plank	4 October 2026	N/A
9	5	"Whanau"	Charlie Haskell	John Banas, Peter Gawler, Christopher Plank	11 October 2026	TBD
10	6	"A Shared Madness"	Charlie Haskell	Peter Gawler, Christopher Plank	18 October 2026	TBD
