= 25 April (film) =

2015 New Zealand animated documentary film

- Film poster
- Directed by: Leanne Pooley
- Written by: Leanne Pooley; Tim Woodhouse
- Concept by: Matthew Metcalfe
- Produced by: Matthew Metcalfe
- Starring: Fraser Brown; Andrew Grainger; Chelsie Preston Crayford; Gareth Reeves; Tainui Tukiwaho; Matt Whelan
- Edited by: Tim Woodhouse
- Music by: David Long
- Production companies: K5 International; New Zealand Film Commission; Ingenious Media; Flux Animation Studio; GFC Films; Images & Sound; Pitfan Productions
- Distributed by: Transmission Films
- Release dates: 14 September 2015 (TIFF); 28 April 2016 (New Zealand)
- Running time: 85 minutes
- Country: New Zealand
- Language: English

25 April is a 2015 New Zealand animated documentary film directed by Leanne Pooley and written by Pooley and Tim Woodhouse, based on a concept by Matthew Metcalfe who also served as producer. It stars the voices of Fraser Brown, Andrew Grainger, Chelsie Preston Crayford, Gareth Reeves, Tainui Tukiwaho, and Matt Whelan. The film is based on the 1915 Gallipoli Campaign.

25 April was screened in the Contemporary World Cinema section of the 2015 Toronto International Film Festival on 14 September 2015, and was released by Transmission Films in New Zealand on 28 April 2016.

== Cast ==
- Fraser Brown as George Albert Tuck
- Andrew Grainger as Ray
- Chelsie Preston Crayford as Muriel Wakeford
- Gareth Reeves as Ormond Burton
- Tainui Tukiwaho as Thomas "Hāmi" Grace
- Matt Whelan as John Persson

== Reception ==
The film received mostly positive reviews. In New Zealand, Newshub's Tony Wright gave it four-and-a-half stars and described it as "startlingly original", praising the use of animation to depict the "depravity" of war. The New Zealand Herald's Peter Calder similarly called it "evocative and moving", adding that the recreation of first-hand accounts of soldiers and a nurse "knit together to provide a comprehensive account of the doomed eight-month campaign to take the peninsula whose name resounds through our national myth."

Graeme Tuckett, of Stuff.co.nz, gave 25 April a negative review with two-and-a-half stars. He wrote that it lacked "any sort of context or overview", failed to focus on any Ottoman soldiers and was "unoriginal". He compared it unfavorably with Tolga Ornek's Gallipoli (2005).

Tom Peters and Sam Price of the World Socialist Web Site wrote that the documentary had some "moving portrayals" but criticized it for not opposing the First World War itself, instead taking a "national-isolationist" position. They also noted the film-makers' "almost exclusive focus on what the New Zealand and Australian forces endured" and failure to "convey the enormity of the Ottoman Empire's casualties."

== Accolades ==
Award	Category	Recipient(s)	Result
2017 Rialto Channel New Zealand Film Awards	Best Documentary	25 April	Nominated
2017 Rialto Channel New Zealand Film Awards	Best Documentary Director	Leanne Pooley	Nominated
2017 Rialto Channel New Zealand Film Awards	Best Documentary Editor	Tim Woodhouse	Nominated
