= Rifting Apart =

- Ash vs Evil Dead episode
- Episode no.: Season 3 Episode 8
- Directed by: Mark Beesley
- Written by: Bryan Hill
- Cinematography by: Andrew McGeorge
- Editing by: Jochen Fitzherbert
- Original release date: April 15, 2018
- Running time: 29 minutes

Guest appearances
- Emelia Burns as Zoë; Grace Cullen as Teen Girl; Mikaela Ruegg as Gown Girl; Albertina Jonas as Amy; Jeff Szusterman as Sheriff; Colin Garlick as Deputy Masters; Katete Banda as Coroner #1

Episode chronology
← Previous "Twist and Shout"	Next → "Judgement Day"

"Rifting Apart" is the eighth episode of the third season of the American comedy horror television series Ash vs Evil Dead, which serves as a continuation of the Evil Dead trilogy. It is the 28th overall episode of the series and was written by Bryan Hill, and directed by Mark Beesley. It originally aired on the premium channel Starz on April 15, 2018.

The series is set 30 years after the events of the Evil Dead trilogy, and follows Ash Williams, who now works at the "Value Stop" as a simple stock boy. Having spent his life not doing anything remarkable since the events of the trilogy, Ash will have to renounce his routine existence and become a hero once more by taking up arms and facing the titular Evil Dead. In the episode, Ash kills himself in order to enter the Deadlands and save Brandy and Kelly.

According to Nielsen Media Research, the episode was seen by an estimated 0.175 million household viewers and gained a 0.08 ratings share among adults aged 18–49. The episode received critical acclaim, with critics praising the action, performances, humor and set-up for the final episodes.

== Plot ==
Authorities retrieve the corpses from the school dance, while police search for Ash (Bruce Campbell). As they hide, Ash laments the death of his daughter, while being told by Pablo (Ray Santiago) that Kelly (Dana DeLorenzo) died and someone possessed her body. Realizing that Brandy (Arielle Carver-O'Neill) may be in the Rift, they steal her body from the coroner.

At the Deadlands, Brandy escapes from a shadow creature and encounters Dalton (Lindsay Farris), taking her with Kelly. Back in the real world, Ash and Pablo take Brandy's body to the cellar at the hardware store. In order to enter, Ash must die by supernatural presence, so he stabs himself with the Kandarian Dagger. Ash enters the Deadlands, finding that his right hand has been restored. He eventually finds the group, intending to take them to the hardware store where Pablo will open the Rift. In the real world, Pablo finds that Brandy's body has vanished and while investigating, discovers that a Deadite possessed the corpse, which turned out to be not Brandy.

With the shadow creature lurking outside, the group decides to go outside. Their attempts to reach the hardware store prove fruitless as the shadow is blocking them. Dalton sacrifices himself by getting consumed by the creature, allowing the group to escape in Ash's Delta. They arrive at the hardware store, but Pablo hasn't opened it. After Pablo kills the Deadite, he performs the spell that opens the Rift. Ash and Brandy enter, but Kelly is unable to leave as the Rift closes. Ash wakes up in his body, while Brandy awakens in her bag, with Ash intending to save Kelly. At her hideout, Ruby (Lucy Lawless) is visited by Kaya in Kelly's body, who has brought a kidnapped Zoë (Emelia Burns). Realizing she speaks Latin, Ruby intends to use her to "rewrite our destiny".

== Production ==
=== Development ===
The episode was written by Bryan Hill, and directed by Mark Beesley. It was Hill's first writing credit, and Beesley's sixth directorial credit.

== Reception ==
=== Viewers ===
In its original American broadcast, "Rifting Apart" was seen by an estimated 0.175 million household viewers and gained a 0.08 ratings share among adults aged 18–49, according to Nielsen Media Research. This means that 0.08 percent of all households with televisions watched the episode. This was a 28% increase in viewership from the previous episode, which was watched by 0.136 million viewers with a 0.06 in the 18-49 demographics.

=== Critical reviews ===
"Rifting Apart" received critical acclaim. Michael Roffman of The A.V. Club gave the episode an "A" grade and wrote, "Though, if this were the last hurrah for The Evil Dead franchise, showrunner Mark Verheiden is doing a remarkable job with the fireworks. 'Rifting Apart' feels like the first medley of explosions, giving fans a chance to enjoy the best of their respective heroes, while also biting their nails for what's waiting for them around the corner."

Stephen Harber of Den of Geek gave the episode a 4.5 star rating out of 5 and wrote, "On the whole, 'Rifting Apart' is a victory for Ash vs Evil Dead and its band of misfit heroes, if not because they transcend the walls of death to reunite with each other, then because it gives the show a little bit of heart that doesn’t get too sappy. That's quite an achievement for an off-color horror sitcom that seeks to offend you at every turn."

Steve Ford of TV Fanatic gave the episode a 4 star rating out of 5 and wrote, "'Rifting Apart' was easily one of the best episodes of an already fantastic season. Ash's rescue attempt did seem a bit too simple and effortless, but it did provide a satisfying look into the bazaar and creepy world of the Deadlands." Bryan Kristopowitz of 411Mania gave the episode a 9 out of 10 rating and wrote, "'Rifting Apart' is another great Ash vs. Evil Dead episode, both the series and the season. It's a tight episode that manages to move back and forth between Earth and the rift with ease and features some of the best special effects of the season."
