= Police Ten 7 =

- Genre: Observational Documentary Television Series
- Created by: Ross Jennings
- Developed by: Ross Jennings
- Directed by: Les Dawson
- Presented by: Graham Bell (2002–2014); Rob Lemoto (2014–2023); Sam Wallace co-host (2022)
- Country of origin: New Zealand
- Original language: English
- No. of seasons: 29
- No. of episodes: 750

Production
- Executive producers: Ross Jennings, Philly de Lacey
- Producers: Ross Jennings, Sarah-Luise Whatford
- Camera setup: Chris Brokensha
- Running time: 22 minutes (approximate)
- Production company: Screentime

Original release
- Network: TVNZ 2
- Release: 18 July 2002 – 2 May 2023

Police Ten 7 (titled Ten 7 Aotearoa during 2022) is a New Zealand reality television show, devised, created and produced by Ross Jennings for Screentime with the assistance of the New Zealand Police for TVNZ 2, a channel owned by public broadcaster TVNZ. The show profiled wanted offenders and asks the public (viewers) to help the police in their search for them. In addition, the programme followed the work of police officers in their patrols and other police activities. In February 2023 TVNZ cancelled the series. By that time, the series had produced a total of 750 episodes across 29 seasons.

== History ==
=== Background ===
New Zealand's earliest versions of a police frontline crime show were Police 5 hosted by Keith Bracey from 1976 until 1986, and a local version of Crimewatch which was hosted by Ian Johnstone with Natalie Brunt (1987–88), Carol Hirschfeld (1989–93), Tiana Tofilau (1994) and Mairanga White (1995–96). Crimewatch aired from 1987 until 1996 when it was replaced a year later by Crimescene with White as host; it aired for two years, finishing in 1998.

=== Launch ===
Police Ten 7 was first launched by public broadcaster TVNZ in 2002. The series was hosted by retired Detective Inspector Graham Bell and produced by Australian production company Screentime.

The series took its name from the New Zealand Police ten-code 10-7, which means "Unit has arrived at job". As the show's host, Bell developed a reputation for "straight-talking" and provocative language directed against suspects including "vicious morons," "gutless goons," and "lunatic scumbags."

=== 2014 revamp ===
In September 2014, Detective Sergeant Rob Lemoto succeeded Bell as Police Ten 7's host. Lemoto's appointment was accompanied by a format update and a cultural shift emphasising the programme's values and representations.

=== Allegations of racism and 2021 review ===
By 2021, Police Ten 7 faced allegations of racism against Māori and Pasifika peoples and criticism for its alleged favourable portrayal of policing. Auckland councillor Efeso Collins called TVNZ to scrap the series, claiming that it harmed Māori and Pasifika communities for "low-level" entertainment. Similar criticism was echoed by Race Relations Commissioner Meng Foon, who claimed that the show perpetuated negative and racist stereotypes of certain ethnic communities. In response, former host Bell defended Police Ten 7, claiming that certain sectors of New Zealand society were "grossly over-represented in the crime statistics."

Following allegations of racism, TVNZ Screentime commissioned Auckland University of Technology dean of law Khylee Quince and media consultant Karen Bieleski to conduct an independent review of Police Ten 7. In late September 2021, the review criticised the series' "goodies versus baddies" approach to crime and policing and Bell's provocative language. However, the review praised later episodes for focusing on the impact of crime and the mental state of participants. Still, the review concluded that many members of the public did not trust the series due to its earlier episodes. In response to the review, TVNZ's director of content Cate Slater and Screentime chief executive Philly de Lacey confirmed that the series would continue but would be more "responsible and representative of New Zealand's population."

=== 2022 revamp and cancellation ===
Following the 2021 independent review, the show was renamed Ten 7 Aotearoa in April 2022. In addition, the show's format and style was "refreshed" to give a more representative picture of policing in New Zealand and to focus on crime prevention and education. Presenter Sam Wallace also joined the series as co-host.

On 10 February 2023, TVNZ announced that Ten 7 Aotearoa would be cancelled due to declining audience ratings. Director of content Slater attributed the decline in viewership to the limited viewing window on digital platforms following its initial broadcast and a decline in broadcast viewership towards online viewership. By February 2023, the series had produced a total of 750 episodes across 29 seasons. Ten 7 was credited with 763 arrests and solving over 1,000 crimes including serious assaults and homicides. The series also featured 4,607 criminal cases. Ten 7 concluded with three one-hour specials in April 2023 on TVNZ 2.

== Format ==
=== Crimes and wanted criminals ===
The crimes and wanted offenders section of the show usually features up to five crimes or persons wanted for various offences, including burglary, assault, and drug offences.

One case is the episode's main case, and involves the host visiting the scene of the crime. A local detective takes the host and the audience through the events preceding, during, and following the offence. The alleged offender or offenders wanted are described, often with security camera footage or IdentiKit images. Other cases are described in smaller detail, and are either crimes with unknown offenders, or known offenders with warrants for their arrest.

Viewers are instructed to come forward with any information by telephoning the Police Ten 7 hotline on 0800-10-7-INFO (0800-10-7-4636). Information provided through the Police Ten 7 hotline has resulted in over 450 arrests since the show began, and some recent episodes have resulted in some fast arrests – one show in July 2009 resulted in all five wanted faces being arrested within 48 hours.

=== Police duties ===
Each episode usually follows two or three call-outs by police in various cities around New Zealand, for various offences including alcoholism, drugs, violence, vandalism, theft, and general disorder. Sometimes the stories are light-hearted to break with the serious tone of the show. Events included in the 2010 season included the policing of University of Otago's Orientation Week and the Wellington Sevens. The then-coach of the Sevens was questioned over a parking violation, but was released when it was established he had been parked there for "at least thirty seconds".

== Distribution ==
The series also aired in Australia on Fox8 and in the United Kingdom on Pick until 1 January 2023, later being moved to Great! Real in March 2024 upon the channel's launch.

== In popular culture ==
- In October 2009, one of the police duties segments became an internet hit. Auckland’s then Senior Constable, now Senior Sergeant Guy Baldwin was investigating a potential car thief claiming he was going to a local BP service station at 3am to buy a pie, when he told the suspect he must "always blow on the pie", before adding the New Zealand Police motto "Safer communities together".
- The programme was often referred to on the Australian radio show Get This.

== Awards ==
- TV Guide Best on the Box Awards 2010 – Best Reality Series
- TV Guide Best on the Box Awards 2011 – Best Reality Series

== Controversy ==
=== Broadcasting standards breaches ===
In February 2011, the Broadcasting Standards Authority (BSA) upheld a privacy complaint against Police Ten 7 for broadcasting a police raid on a man’s home without his consent in a July 2010 episode. The footage, which included shots of the man's house, body, voice, and property, was filmed during the execution of a search warrant and later aired with his face blurred. The BSA found the broadcast constituted an offensive intrusion into the complainant’s seclusion, noting that the man had not signed a consent form and that the low-level cannabis possession offence did not justify the privacy breach. The Authority awarded the complainant $1,500 in compensation and ordered TVNZ to pay $1,000 in costs to the Crown.

== See also ==
- Motorway Patrol
