= Narcos season 3 =

Season of television series

Narcos
- Season 3
- Blu-ray cover (Region B)
- Starring: Pedro Pascal; Damián Alcázar; Alberto Ammann; Francisco Denis; Pêpê Rapazote; Matias Varela; Javier Cámara; Arturo Castro; Eric Lange; Andrea Londo; Kerry Bishé; Michael Stahl-David; Matt Whelan; José María Yazpik
- No. of episodes: 10

Release
- Original network: Netflix
- Original release: September 1, 2017

Season chronology
- ← Previous; Narcos Season 2 Next → Narcos: Mexico Season 1

The third and final season of Narcos, an American crime thriller drama streaming television series produced and created by Chris Brancato, Carlo Bernard, and Doug Miro, follows the story of the Cali Cartel. Pedro Pascal reprises his role from the previous two seasons.

All 10 episodes of the season became available for streaming on Netflix on September 1, 2017, and were met with very positive reviews.

Narcos was initially renewed for a fourth season, but it instead became Narcos: Mexico, a prequel/sequel companion series.

== Cast and characters ==
=== Main ===
- Pedro Pascal as Javier Peña, DEA agent tasked with taking down the Cali cartel
- Damián Alcázar as Gilberto Rodríguez Orejuela – the leader of the Cali Cartel and one of Pablo Escobar's primary rivals
- Alberto Ammann as Hélmer "Pacho" Herrera – a Colombian drug lord and high-ranking member of the Cali Cartel
- Francisco Denis as Miguel Rodríguez Orejuela – a high-ranking member of the Cali Cartel and Gilberto's younger brother
- Pepê Rapazote as José "Chepe" Santacruz-Londoño – a high-ranking member of the Cali Cartel who oversees the group's operations in New York City
- Matias Varela as Jorge Salcedo Cabrera – the Cali Cartel's head of security
- Javier Cámara as Guillermo Pallomari – the chief accountant of the Cali Cartel
- Arturo Castro as David Rodríguez – Miguel's son
- Eric Lange as Bill Stechner – the CIA Station Chief in Colombia
- Andrea Londo as María Salazar – wife of Claudio Salazar, a Colombian drug lord affiliated with the North Valley cartel
- Kerry Bishé as Christina Jurado – the American wife of a banker affiliated with the Cali cartel
- Michael Stahl-David as Chris Feistl – DEA agent working under Peña
- Matt Whelan as Daniel Van Ness – DEA agent partnered with Feistl
- José María Yazpik as Amado Carrillo Fuentes - a Mexican drug trafficker allied with Pacho and the Cali cartel, known as "The Lord of the Skies"
- Juan Carlos Messier as Gustavo Calderón, a corrupt police captain who is murdered by the Cali cartel

=== Recurring ===
- Juan Sebastián Calero as Navegante, a violent associate of the Cali Cartel who works as their top henchman
- Juan Pablo Shuk as Colonel Hugo Martínez, the commander of Search Bloc
- Brett Cullen as Ambassador Arthur Crosby, a former Navy officer sent as US Ambassador to Colombia by George H. W. Bush in 1992, replacing Noonan
- Gaston Velandia as José Serrano, General of the Colombian National Police
- Margarita Rosa de Francisco as Carolina Álvarez, Colombian journalist working for El Tiempo
- Roberto Cano as Darío, David Rodriguez's partner in crime
- Sebastián Eslava as Nicolas Rodríguez, Gilberto's son
- Miguel Ángel Silvestre as Franklin Jurado
- Edward James Olmos as Chucho Peña, Javier's father
- Raymond Ablack as Stoddard
- Shea Whigham as Agent Duffy
- Gabriel Iglesias as Dominican Gangster
- Carlos Camacho as Claudio Salazar
- Taliana Vargas as Paola Salcedo
- Bre Blair as Lorraine
- Wayne Knight as Alan Starkman
- Andrés Crespo as Carlos Córdova
- Lux Pascal (under Lucas Pascal) as Elias

== Episodes ==
No. overall	No. in season	Title	Directed by	Written by	Original release date
21	1	"The Kingpin Strategy"	Andi Baiz	Carlo Bernard & Doug Miro & Eric Newman	September 1, 2017
The Gentlemen of Cali gather their associates together for a big surprise announcement about the future of their business.
22	2	"The Cali KGB"	Andi Baiz	Carlo Bernard & Doug Miro & Eric Newman	September 1, 2017
A gas incident threatens to destroy the agreement between Cali and the government and requires Jorge's help. Peña has problems with his old contact in Los Pepes.
23	3	"Follow the Money"	Gabriel Ripstein	David Matthews	September 1, 2017
The Rodríguez brothers are hiding during the negotiations. Pacho meets the Lord of the Skies in Mexico. Peña's new DEA team visits Cali.
24	4	"Checkmate"	Gabriel Ripstein	Andy Black	September 1, 2017
Peña hatches a plan to try to capture Cali leader Gilberto Rodriguez. Amado proposes a business idea to Pacho. Maria Salazar and her son are reunited and form a family with Miguel Rodriguez.
25	5	"MRO"	Josef Wladyka	Ashley Lyle & Bart Nickerson	September 1, 2017
Rodriguez is in jail. Paranoid about leaks, Miguel cracks down on his security. Colonel Martinez needs to resign, as false evidence about him accepting bribes has come up. Calderón, the dirty cop, is being blamed for the mistakes that led to Rodriguez' arrest. Pacho makes a decision about his new offer. Peña tries to convince the US citizen Christina to make her husband, Franklin Jurado, the main money launderer for the Cali Cartel, flip. Gilberto is shocked by his son's words of not being able to surrender anymore.
26	6	"Best Laid Plans"	Josef Wladyka	Jason George	September 1, 2017
Jorge takes a dangerous risk collaborating with the DEA. An accident in New York threatens to expose Chepe. Peña travels to Curacao to arrest Franklin Jurado. Miguel and the Cali Cartel suffer a deadly attack by the North Valley Cartel during the party.
27	7	"Sin Salida"	Fernando Coimbra	Santa Sierra & Clayton Trussell	September 1, 2017
Peña plans another secret operation to topple a member of the Cali Cartel but may run out of time while looking for him.
28	8	"Convivir"	Fernando Coimbra	Andy Black	September 1, 2017
David seeks revenge on behalf of his father and puts Enrique in danger. Peña asks Don Berna for help on a rescue mission.
29	9	"Todos Los Hombres del Presidente"	Andi Baiz	Jason George & Carlo Bernard & Doug Miro	September 1, 2017
David follows his suspicions. Peña is shocked to discover the depth of corruption in the Colombian government. Miguel is sought after once again.
30	10	"Going Back to Cali"	Andi Baiz	Carlo Bernard & Doug Miro	September 1, 2017
David and Peña are in a race against each other to find Pallomari. Peña makes a serious decision about the future of his career.

== Reception ==
On Rotten Tomatoes, the third season holds an approval rating of 97% based on 23 reviews, with an average rating of 7.46/10. The site's critical consensus reads, "Narcos continues to evolve in its third season, drawing on historical details to take viewers on a thoroughly gripping -- and unsettlingly timely -- journey into darkness." On Metacritic, season three holds a score of 78 out of 100, based on 9 critics, indicating "generally favorable" reviews.
