= Baby Proof (Ash vs Evil Dead) =

- Ash vs Evil Dead episode
- Episode no.: Season 3 Episode 5
- Directed by: Daniel Nettheim
- Written by: Luke Kalteaux
- Cinematography by: Andrew McGeorge
- Editing by: Jochen Fitzherbert
- Original release date: March 25, 2018
- Running time: 29 minutes

Guest appearances
- Hemky Madera as El Brujo; Samantha Young as Natalie; Hannah Tasker-Poland as Masked Woman; Jodie Hillock as Sheriff

Episode chronology
← Previous "Unfinished Business"	Next → "Tales from the Rift"

"Baby Proof" is the fifth episode of the third season of the American comedy horror television series Ash vs Evil Dead, which serves as a continuation of the Evil Dead trilogy. It is the 25th overall episode of the series and was written by producer Luke Kalteaux, and directed by Daniel Nettheim. It originally aired on the premium channel Starz on March 25, 2018.

The series is set 30 years after the events of the Evil Dead trilogy, and follows Ash Williams, who now works at the "Value Stop" as a simple stock boy. Having spent his life not doing anything remarkable since the events of the trilogy, Ash will have to renounce his routine existence and become a hero once more by taking up arms and facing the titular Evil Dead. In the episode, Ash discovers Ruby's spawn and tries to catch it. Meanwhile, Pablo tries to regain control of his body.

According to Nielsen Media Research, the episode was seen by an estimated 0.179 million household viewers and gained a 0.10 ratings share among adults aged 18–49. The episode received positive reviews from critics, who praised the character development and action sequences, although some criticized the pacing.

== Plot ==
At the attic, Ash (Bruce Campbell) discovers that the spawn is part of him, as it is resembling his face and chainsaw. Still jammed to the sink that cuffed Natalie (Samantha Young), Ash escapes from the attic and both hide through the house, with Ash planning to keep the baby alive to show as proof. They eventually release themselves, but find that the house has locked them inside.

Back at Ash's trailer home, the possessed Pablo (Ray Santiago) finally enters and attacks Brandy (Arielle Carver-O'Neill), while Kelly (Dana DeLorenzo) tries to stop him. Brandy eventually stabs Pablo with the Kandarian Dagger, despite Kelly telling her not to do it. Pablo finds himself in a realm between life and death, where he reunites with El Brujo (Hemky Madera). El Brujo explains that his journey is not over and he will need to perform a ritual to return to life and succeed him as the new Brujo. After struggling with the performance, Pablo finishes it and resurrects, to Brandy's horror and Kelly's delight, who kisses him. Pablo states that he must find Ash, while Kelly promises revenge against Ruby (Lucy Lawless).

While wandering, Natalie is caught by the spawn and is killed. Ash finds her beheaded corpse and continues hunting the spawn, who constantly attacks Ash while he cannot do anything to prevent it. The spawn then uses Natalie's headless body as suit to attack Ash, but he defeats him by trapping him with bowling bowls and finally taking him out of the house. He goes to the hardware store, where he meets with Brandy to show him the spawn. Ruby appears, just as the sheriff is also called at the scene. Ash opens the trunk, but finds that the spawn ate Natalie's corpse to free himself. Ruby and the sheriff chastise Ash. However, to Ash's surprise, Brandy steps into his car and invites him to join her. He steps in and both escape as the sheriff calls them out.

== Production ==
=== Development ===
The episode was written by producer Luke Kalteaux, and directed by Daniel Nettheim. It was Kalteaux's second writing credit, and Nettheim's second directorial credit.

== Reception ==
=== Viewers ===
In its original American broadcast, "Baby Proof" was seen by an estimated 0.179 million household viewers and gained a 0.10 ratings share among adults aged 18–49, according to Nielsen Media Research. This means that 0.10 percent of all households with televisions watched the episode. This was a slight increase in viewership from the previous episode, which was watched by 0.176 million viewers with a 0.06 in the 18-49 demographics.

=== Critical reviews ===
"Baby Proof" received positive reviews from critics. Michael Roffman of The A.V. Club gave the episode a "B+" grade and wrote, "Time flies when you're having fun — and by fun, we mean, dodging sperm samples to the sounds of a-ha, itching at Deadite skin lesions, and shoving bowling balls up a dead woman’s crotch. Even so, we're still only halfway through the third season of Ash Vs. Evil Dead, which means we have five more episodes to add to all the chaos we've already witnessed this season. And by now, it's really anyone's guess as to what else showrunner Mark Verheiden and his team of writers might toss at Ash and his traumatized Ghost Beaters. After watching 'Baby Proof,' though, it's quite obvious that everyone's game for what's to come — even Ash's daughter, Brandy."

Stephen Harber of Den of Geek gave the episode a 4 star rating out of 5 and wrote, "As I said back up there somewhere, there is much to appreciate about 'Baby Proof', but some of the line deliveries, minor pacing issues, and that indescribable yet instantly recognizable mid-season feeling permeates throughout it make it feel like just another day at the office. But it's still better and more exciting than the Baal plot-line that was taking off this time during season two, that's for sure."

Steve Ford of TV Fanatic gave the episode a 4.5 star rating out of 5 and wrote, "This was yet another wild and fun episode. Ruby's child stalking Ash throughout the house was genuinely terrifying at times, and the headless fight with Ash was some of the absolute craziest things Ash vs Evil Dead has done to date." Bryan Kristopowitz of 411Mania gave the episode an 8 out of 10 rating and wrote, "Episode five of season three, 'Baby Proof', is one of the most messed up episodes of Ash vs. Evil Dead so far. If it isn't the most messed up, it’s damn close."
