= Kakamatua Inlet =

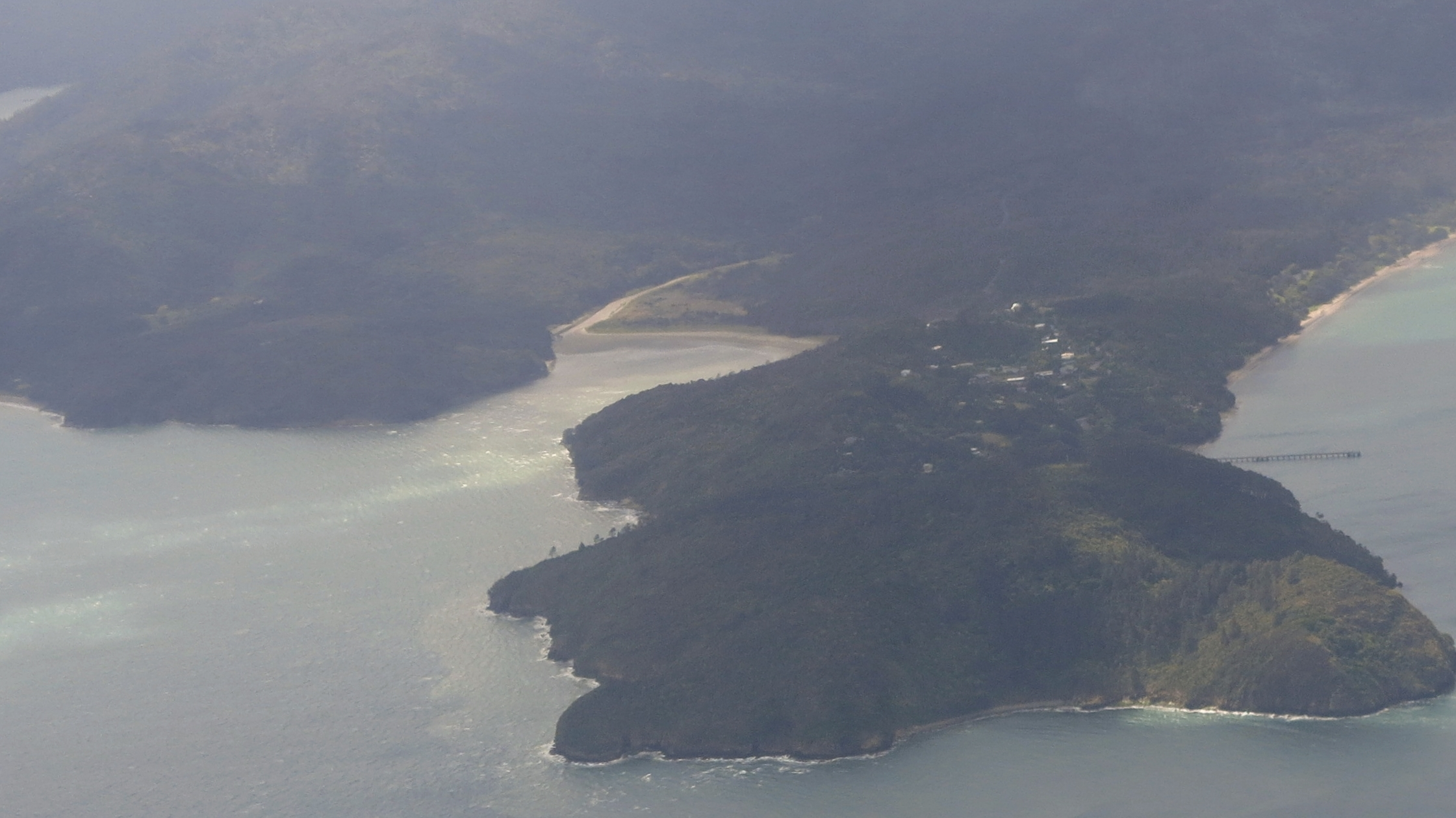
- Aerial view of Kakamatua Inlet, west of Cornwallis on the Karangahape Peninsula.

- Location within Auckland
- Coordinates: 37.008067°S 174.595232°E
- Part of: Manukau Harbour
- River sources: Kakamatua Stream

The Kakamatua Inlet is an inlet of the Manukau Harbour of the Auckland Region of New Zealand's North Island.

== Geography ==
The Kakamatua Inlet is bordered between Huia to the west and the Karangahape Peninsula and settlement of Cornwallis to the east. It is the point where the Kakamatua Stream reaches the Manukau Harbour.

== History ==
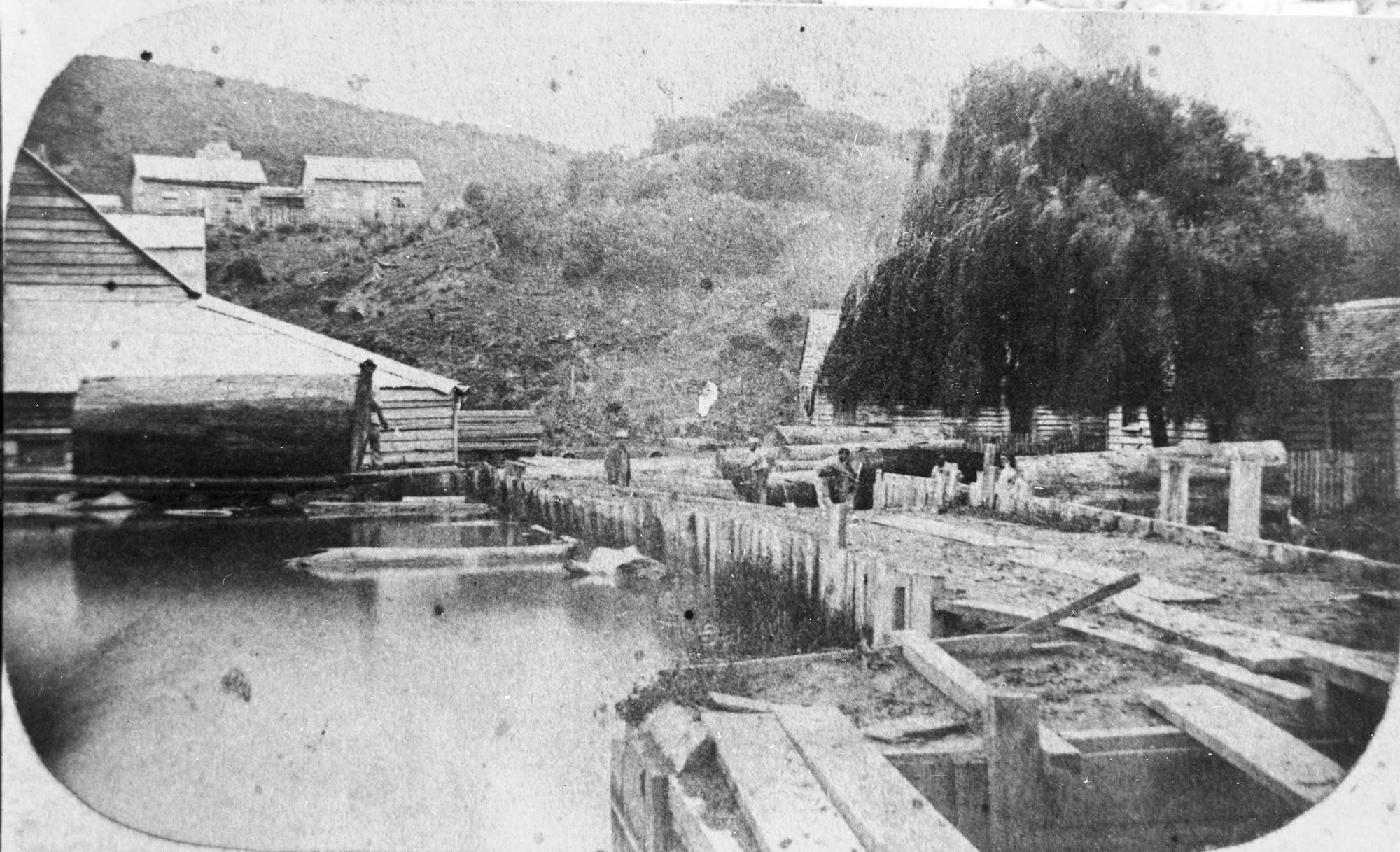
The Roe sawmill, pictured in the 1860s

The creek is in the traditional rohe of the iwi Te Kawerau ā Maki and other Tāmaki Māori. The location was given the name after Te Kawerau ā Maki returned to West Auckland after the Musket Wars and settled at Kakamatua in 1836. The name "Kakamātua" referenced Te Mātua and Te Kaka Whakaara, the head land and the pā at Karekare which were attacked in 1825 during the Musket Wars. After six months and fears of attacks subsided, the iwi moved to the Te Henga / Bethells Beach area.

In the 1860s, New Zealand settler Mathew Roe obtained rights for kauri logging in the valley, building a sawmill at the Kakamatua Inlet at the mouth of the Kakamatua Stream. When he exhausted the kauri resources of the lower valley, Roe constructed a driving dam on the Kakamatua River further up-stream, in order to send logs down the river towards the mill. The sawmill operated until the 1870s.

The inlet was close to the sinking location of HMS Orpheus, which sunk in the Manukau Harbour in 1863. Many of the victims of the shipwreck were buried near the inlet.

== Recreation ==
The Kakamatua Beach Walk is a short nature trail that links Huia Road to the inlet. Much of the inlet is an off-leash area for dogs, and was a popular location for off-leash dog walking even before the Auckland Council officially made Kakamatua an off-leash area for dogs.
