= List of The Elephant Princess episodes =

The following is an episode list for the Australian television show The Elephant Princess, which aired on Network Ten. Season 1 premiered in Australia on 13 November 2008, and season two premiered in Canada on 6 February 2011. The series revolves around Alex Wilson, a teenage girl from suburban Melbourne, Australia, who discovers that she is in fact the heir to the throne of Manjipur, a fictitious kingdom in a parallel world that looks like India.

== Series overview ==
| Series | Episodes | Originally released | |
| Series | Episodes | First released | Last released |
|---|---|---|---|
| 1 | 26 | 13 November 2008 | 24 May 2009 |
| 2 | 26 | 6 February 2011 (Canada) | 6 October 2011 (Canada) |

== Episodes ==
=== Season 1 (2008–09) ===
| No. overall | No. in season | Title | Original release date |
|---|---|---|---|
| 1 | 1 | "Coming of Age" | 13 November 2008 |
On her sixteen birthday, teenage girl Alex Wilson finds a mysterious boy and elephant in her back yard. The boy, Kuru, tells her she is the magical Princess of Manjipur, and that he has come to take her home. In Manjipur, Vashan plots to take over his cousin's throne.
| 2 | 2 | "Don't Call Me Princess" | 20 November 2008 |
Alex finds proof that she was adopted by the Wilsons. Upset by the revelation, she accidentally erases her family from existence. With the help of Kuru, she tries to gesture her first piece of intentional magic to bring everything back to normal.
| 3 | 3 | "Rabbit Season" | 24 November 2008 |
When Alex's friends J.B. and Amanda discover Anala, Alex has no choice but to tell them she is the Princess of Manjipur. Alex then attempts a simple magic trick but it goes awry, filling her backyard full of rabbits.
| 4 | 4 | "Kuru the Guru" | 25 November 2008 |
Kuru enrols at Alex's school, but has a hard time fitting in. Trying to help, Alex uses magic to make him popular, but things start to get out of control.
| 5 | 5 | "The Powerful Ballad" | 26 November 2008 |
Alex learns how to levitate objects and, to celebrate, gives some magic to Kuru. But when Kuru returns to Manjipur, he is taken captive by Vashan, who wants to learn more about his cousin. To escape, Kuru uses Alex's magic gift, which is enchanted to let him fly, his use of it which makes Alex float up in the air whenever Kuru floats up in the air.
| 6 | 6 | "Not Made in Japan" | 27 November 2008 |
Vashan manages to infect Alex's magic, which causes Alex to accidentally bring an anime doll to life. J.B. is smitten with the girl, but as a direct reversal of her anime identity, she is highly dangerous, and Alex must find a way to reverse the spell before J.B. gets seriously hurt.
| 7 | 7 | "Lean on Me" | 28 November 2008 |
Alex is invited to visit Manjipur, and while she is reluctant at first, she agrees. Meanwhile, she also uses magic to get her band into a talent contest. Unfortunately, the two events collide, and Alex eventually chooses the competition. While her band does well in the contest, her non-appearance at the banquet causes Kuru to be fired, and it is up to Alex to fix things.
| 8 | 8 | "Welcome to the Fairytale" | 5 December 2008 |
Alex, Amanda and J.B sneak into Manjipur without Kuru. But while visiting the marketplace, they run into trouble.
| 9 | 9 | "Warts and All" | 12 December 2008 |
To find out if Marcus is in love with her, Alex uses magic and accidentally turns herself into a frog. To return to normal, Alex must be kissed by her one and only true love, but Alex and her friends think it's Marcus and her friends have a hard time convincing Marcus to kiss Alex (a slimy green frog). At the end Kuru kisses Alex and she returns to normal; that means Kuru is her one and only true love.
| 10 | 10 | "The Butterfly Effect" | 1 February 2009 |
Vashan magically transforms his servant Diva into a teenage girl with the power to transform herself into a butterfly. Sneaking into Alex's world, Diva takes the identity of Juliet, and begins to disrupt Alex's life, while moving in on Kuru.
| 11 | 11 | "Butterfly Kiss" | 8 February 2009 |
Diva and Vashan plot to use the identity of 'Juliet' to break Alex and Kuru's friendship, in order to stop him from helping her with her magic. Alex begins to get jealous over Juliet and Kuru's budding relationship, and events reach breaking point when the magic runes go missing.
| 12 | 12 | "Dancing Queen" | 15 February 2009 |
Alex uses magic to help her little sister Zoe perform in a ballet recital, while J.B. finds out just how much one of Kuru's gold coin is worth.
| 13 | 13 | "Destiny's Child" | 22 February 2009 |
To find out more about her biological mother, Queen Nefari, Alex secretly travels to Manjipur. But while visiting a memorial to the Queen, Alex is ambushed by Vashan.
| 14 | 14 | "Time After Time" | 1 March 2009 |
Alex goes on her first date with Marcus, using the 'time-slip' spell to make sure every moment is perfect. Meanwhile, Vashan tries to ingratiate himself with Anala, in order to travel to Alex's world.
| 15 | 15 | "Happy Birthday, Anala" | 8 March 2009 |
Alex agrees to attend the celebration of the Royal Elephant Anala's birthday party in Manjipur. But the celebration ends in disaster when a royal jewel is stolen and Kuru is imprisoned.
| 16 | 16 | "The Big Gig" | 15 March 2009 |
While Vashan and Diva try to work out how to use Anala's jewel to travel to Alex's world, Alex's band faces some difficult choices.
| 17 | 17 | "Masquerade Ball" | 22 March 2009 |
Alex and her friends attend the school's annual ball, while Vashan finally manages to travel to Alex's world. Crashing the ball, Vashan uses magic to cause havoc.
| 18 | 18 | "Almost Too Famous" | 29 March 2009 |
In order to stop her wanting to become the Ruler of Manjipur, Vashan uses magic to turn Alex into the most famous rock star in the world. In the end, Alex must choose between staying in her rock star world, or return to her princess life.
| 19 | 19 | "Princess Amanda" | 5 April 2009 |
When Amanda secretly travels to Manjipur alone, she is mistaken for a princess in disguise by the commoners. Things go well for Amanda until she is captured by Vashan, who plans to harm the 'princess' with powerful magic.
| 20 | 20 | "Courtroom Jewel" | 12 April 2009 |
Marcus begins to feel jealous of Alex and Kuru. While in Manjipur, Vashan frames Omar for stealing the Royal Jewel, and it's up to Alex and Kuru to prove his innocence.
| 21 | 21 | "Sea Change" | 19 April 2009 |
Alex misses a recording session whilst out looking for Anala with Kuru, and this has disastrous consequences for both her band and her relationship with Marcus.
| 22 | 22 | "Revelation" | 26 April 2009 |
After being dumped by Marcus and her band, Alex travels to Manjipur to finally accept her role as princess. But her trip reveals a secret that will change her world forever.
| 23 | 23 | "It's An Ordinary Life" | 3 May 2009 |
After being lied to about the identity of her real father, Alex abdicates the throne and swears off magic forever. While Kuru prepares to return to Manjipur, Diva reveals a little secret of her own.
| 24 | 24 | "Unexpected Arrivals" | 10 May 2009 |
Vashan's preparations for his coronation are cut short when Diva uses her magic to lock him in the dungeons, whilst Omar is seriously injured trying to stop her. Omar and Kuru flee to the Wilsons' house, where Alex must decide whether or not to use magic to help Omar. Diva imprisons Anala with the golden chains of command.
| 25 | 25 | "Good Vibrations" | 17 May 2009 |
With Anala being held captive by Diva, Alex and Kuru are stranded in her world. Alex must find another way to cross the barrier in order to save Omar and her kingdom. She breaks the barrier with royal magic and some help from Anala who is now under the golden chains. But Alex is weakened by this enormous effort and Diva manages to drain her magic as well.
| 26 | 26 | "Normal Alex Wilson" | 24 May 2009 |
Alex is thrown in the dungeons with Omar and Vashan after Diva steals her magic too. Now powerless, Alex must rely on Kuru and her loyal subjects to help her stop Diva's coronation and save her kingdom. At the end, Anala restores to Alex her magical powers with the rune symbol. With her magic newly restored, she proves her royal magic is stronger than Diva's magic using the "reveal your true form" spell which causes Diva to crumble into pieces and explode. Alex is officially acknowledged by the people of Manjipur and crowned by Anala in the coronation ceremony.

=== Season 2 (2011) ===
| No. overall | No. in season | Title | Original release date |
|---|---|---|---|
| 27 | 1 | "Enemies Unleashed" | 6 February 2011 (Canada) |
| 28 | 2 | "The New Recruit" | 13 February 2011 (Canada) |
| 29 | 3 | "Bad Reputation" | 20 February 2011 (Canada) |
| 30 | 4 | "Falling for the Enemy" | 27 February 2011 (Canada) |
| 31 | 5 | "Star Crossed Lovers" | 6 March 2011 (Canada) |
| 32 | 6 | "Double Trouble" | 13 March 2011 (Canada) |
| 33 | 7 | "Secret Love" | 20 March 2011 (Canada) |
| 34 | 8 | "Love Your Enemy" | 27 March 2011 (Canada) |
| 35 | 9 | "The Secret Admirer" | 3 April 2011 (Canada) |
| 36 | 10 | "Tangled Web" | 10 April 2011 (Canada) |
| 37 | 11 | "Welcome to My World" | 17 April 2011 (Canada) |
| 38 | 12 | "Exposed" | 24 April 2011 (Canada) |
| 39 | 13 | "Exiles" | 1 May 2011 (Canada) |
| 40 | 14 | "Trouble Comes To Town" | 8 May 2011 (Canada) |
| 41 | 15 | "Under New Management" | 15 May 2011 (Canada) |
| 42 | 16 | "Dangerous Secrets" | 22 May 2011 (Canada) |
| 43 | 17 | "Feud" | 29 May 2011 (Canada) |
| 44 | 18 | "Reinforcements" | 5 June 2011 (Canada) |
| 45 | 19 | "Unmasked" | 12 June 2011 (Canada) |
| 46 | 20 | "A Princess For All" | 19 June 2011 (Canada) |
| 47 | 21 | "Out of Control" | 26 June 2011 (Canada) |
| 48 | 22 | "Flare Up" | 10 July 2011 (Canada) |
| 49 | 23 | "Cursed" | 17 July 2011 (Canada) |
| 50 | 24 | "Hunted" | 24 July 2011 (Canada) |
| 51 | 25 | "Between The Worlds" | 7 August 2011 (Canada) |
| 52 | 26 | "Sacrifice" | 6 October 2011 (Canada) |
