= Cornwallis, New Zealand =

Coastal settlement in West Auckland, New Zealand

Cornwallis
- Suburb
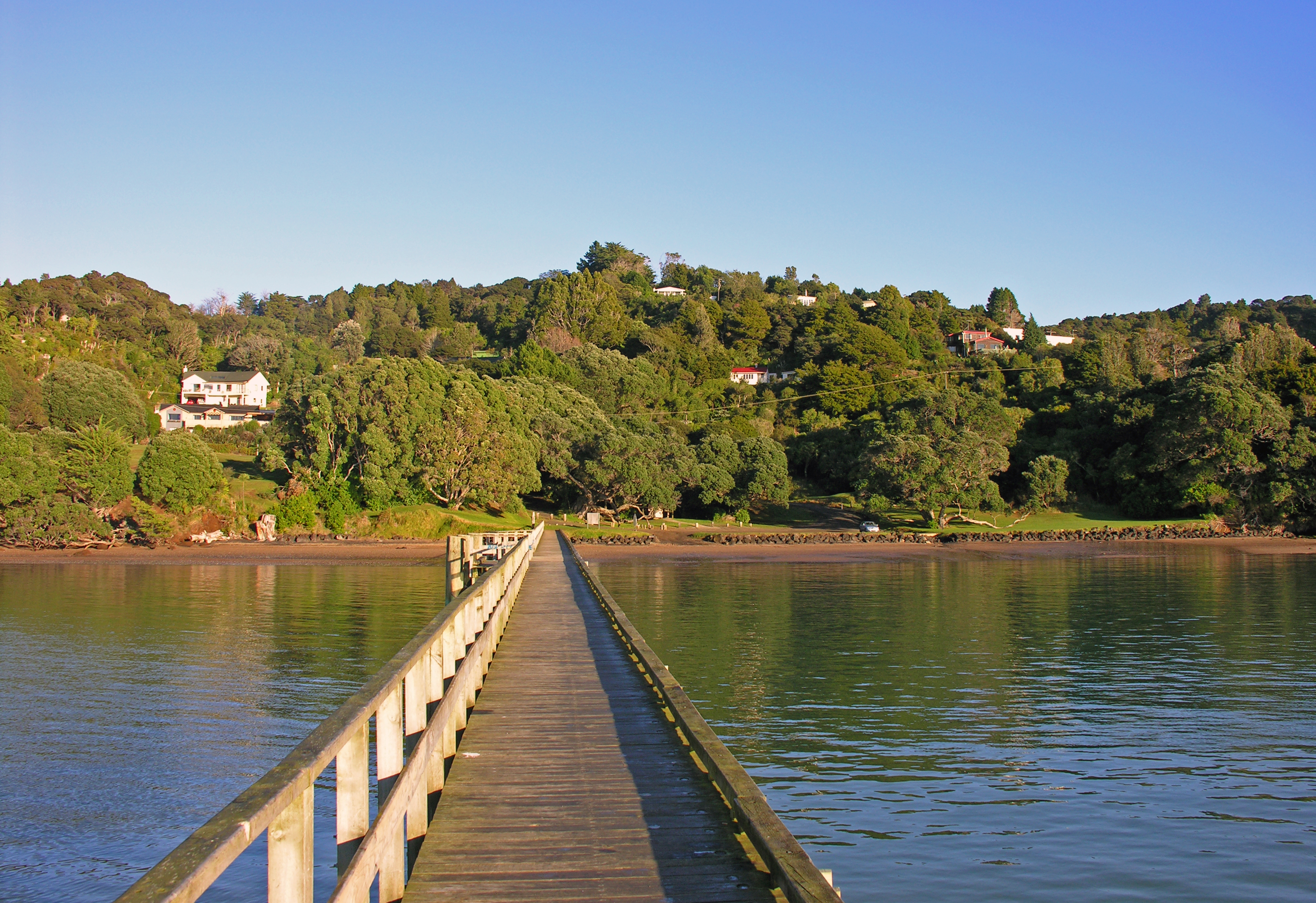
- Looking west from Cornwallis Wharf towards the Cornwallis township.
- Interactive map of Cornwallis
- Coordinates: 37°00′40″S 174°36′14″E
- Country: New Zealand
- City: Auckland
- Electoral ward: Waitākere Ward

Area
  - Land: 755 ha (1,870 acres)

Population (2023 census)
  - Total: 156
  - Density: 20.7/km^{2} (53.5/sq mi)

Huia		Parau
	Cornwallis
	(Manukau Harbour)

Cornwallis is a western coastal settlement of West Auckland, Auckland, New Zealand and forms part of the Waitākere Ranges Regional Park, bordering the Manukau Harbour. It is situated on the Cornwallis Peninsula (previously called the Puponga Peninsula) between the Kakamatua Inlet and Cornwallis Bay to the east. It was the site of the first European settlement in the Auckland Region, a timber and trading port that failed in the 1840s.

== Geography ==
Cornwallis is located on the Cornwallis Peninsula, a 2.7 km peninsula, extending from the Kakamatua Inlet, south to Puponga Point and Lady Bell Point, and northeast to Mill Bay.

The Cornwallis coastal area is dominated by pōhutukawa/rata sheltered coastal fringe forest. Higher elevation areas of the peninsula and mainlands are predominantly a warm lowlands pūriri forest.

== History ==
=== Pre-European history ===
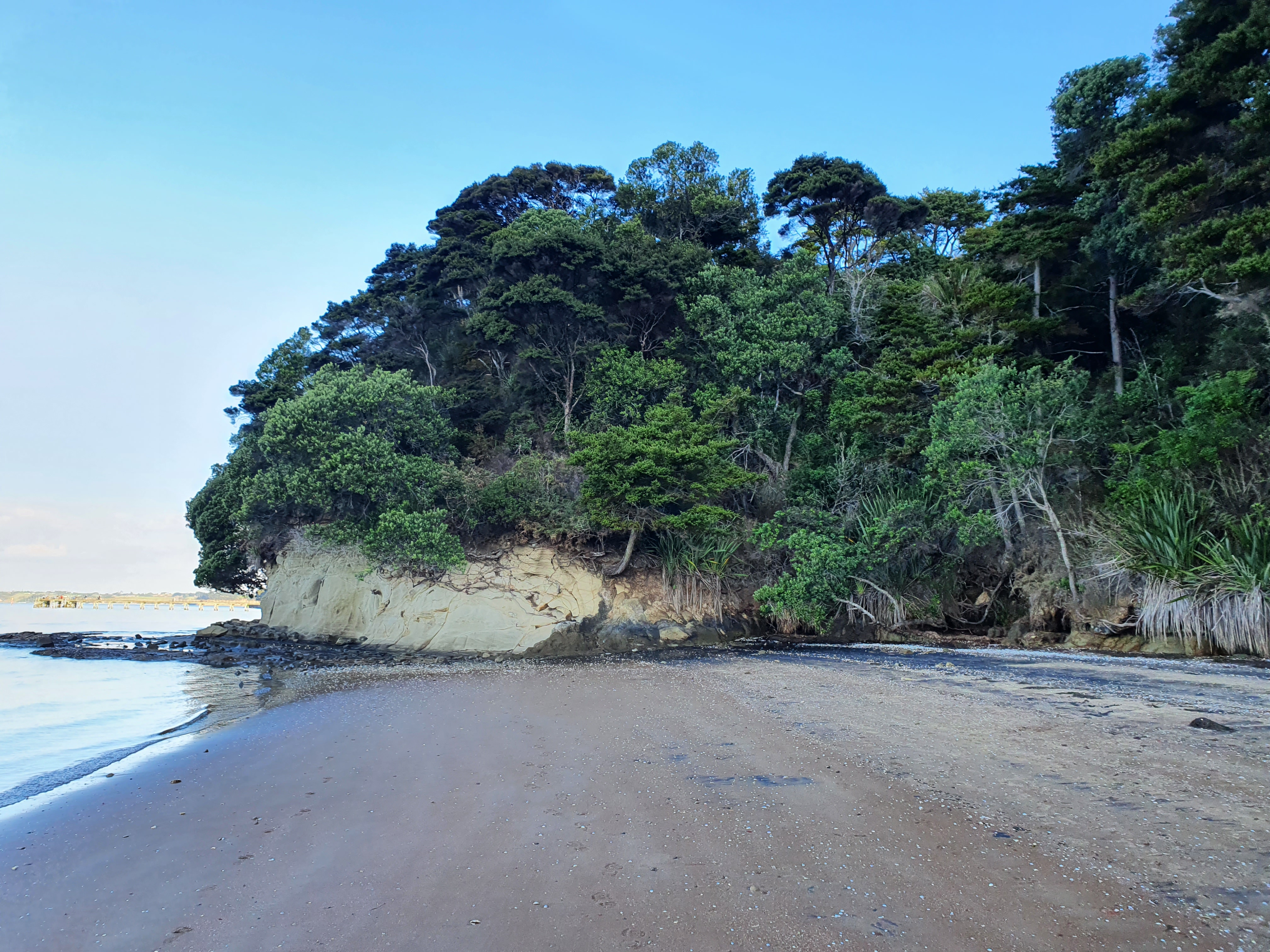
The beach headland site of Karangahape Pā on Cornwallis Beach

The Cornwallis Peninsula is formed from volcanic-derived sandstones and siltstones, which were laid down during the Otaian age in the Lower Miocene, between 21.7 and 18.7 million years ago. Cornwallis was known in pre-colonial times by Tāmaki Māori as Karangahape, named after the tohunga of the Tainui waka and meaning "Hape's chant of welcome". Karangahape was a significant coastal settlement, part of the traditional rohe of the Te Kawerau ā Maki iwi, and alongside nearby Parau, Laingholm and Waima, was an important link facilitating trade between the Waitakere Ranges and the Manukau Harbour. The traditional trail leading from the peninsula to central Auckland was also named after Hape, becoming the namesake of Karangahape Road.

Apihai Te Kawau, paramount chief of Ngāti Whātua Ōrākei, settled on the peninsula in the early 19th century, during which the Karangahape Pā was created on the peninsula. The pā, located at a beach headland north of the Cornwallis Wharf, is one of the few examples of pā that used earthwork ditch defenses in West Auckland. After 1837 and the end of the Musket Wars, most members of Ngāti Whātua returned to settle in Onehunga and Māngere.

=== European settlement ===
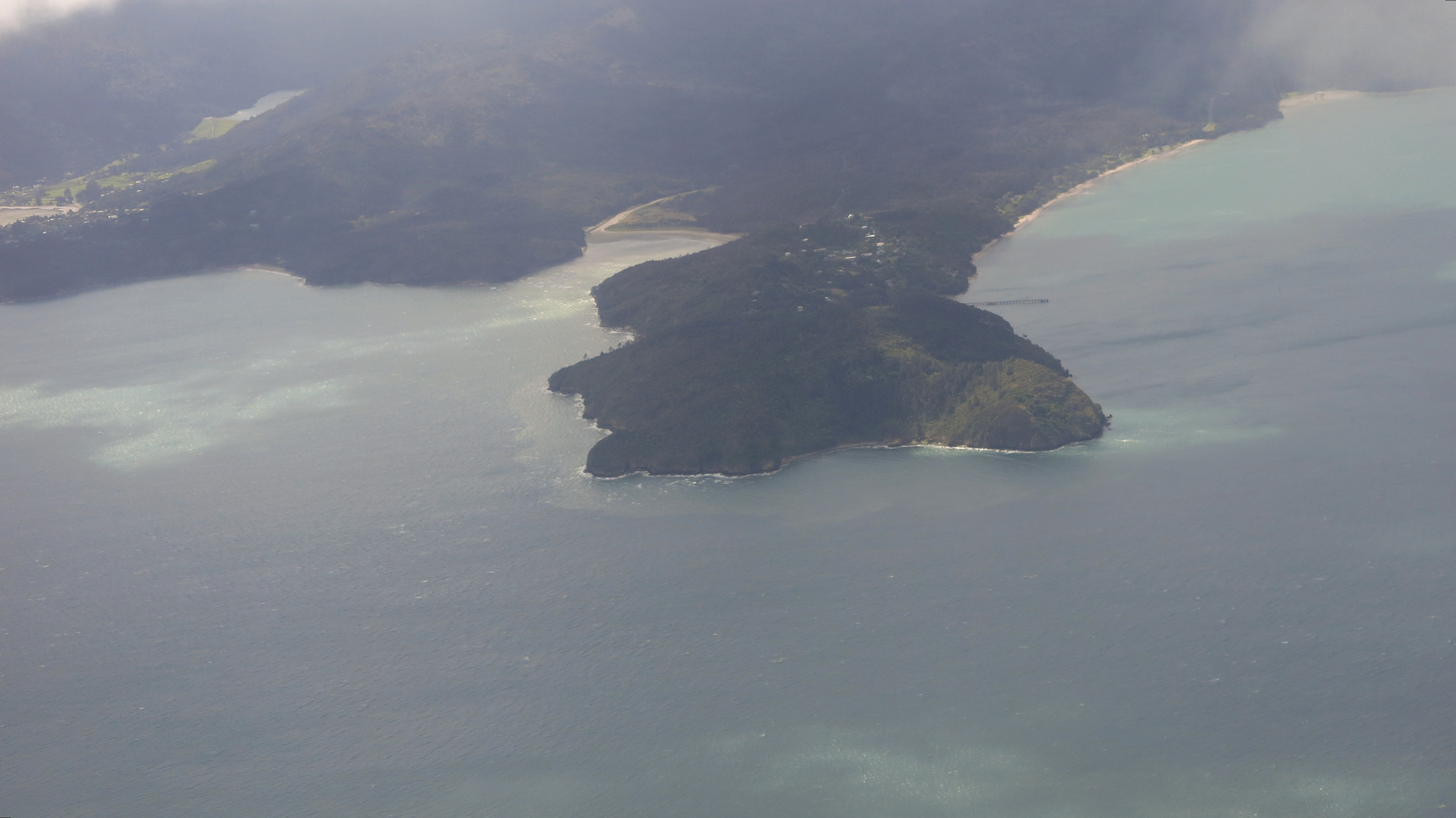
Aerial view of Cornwallis (2015)

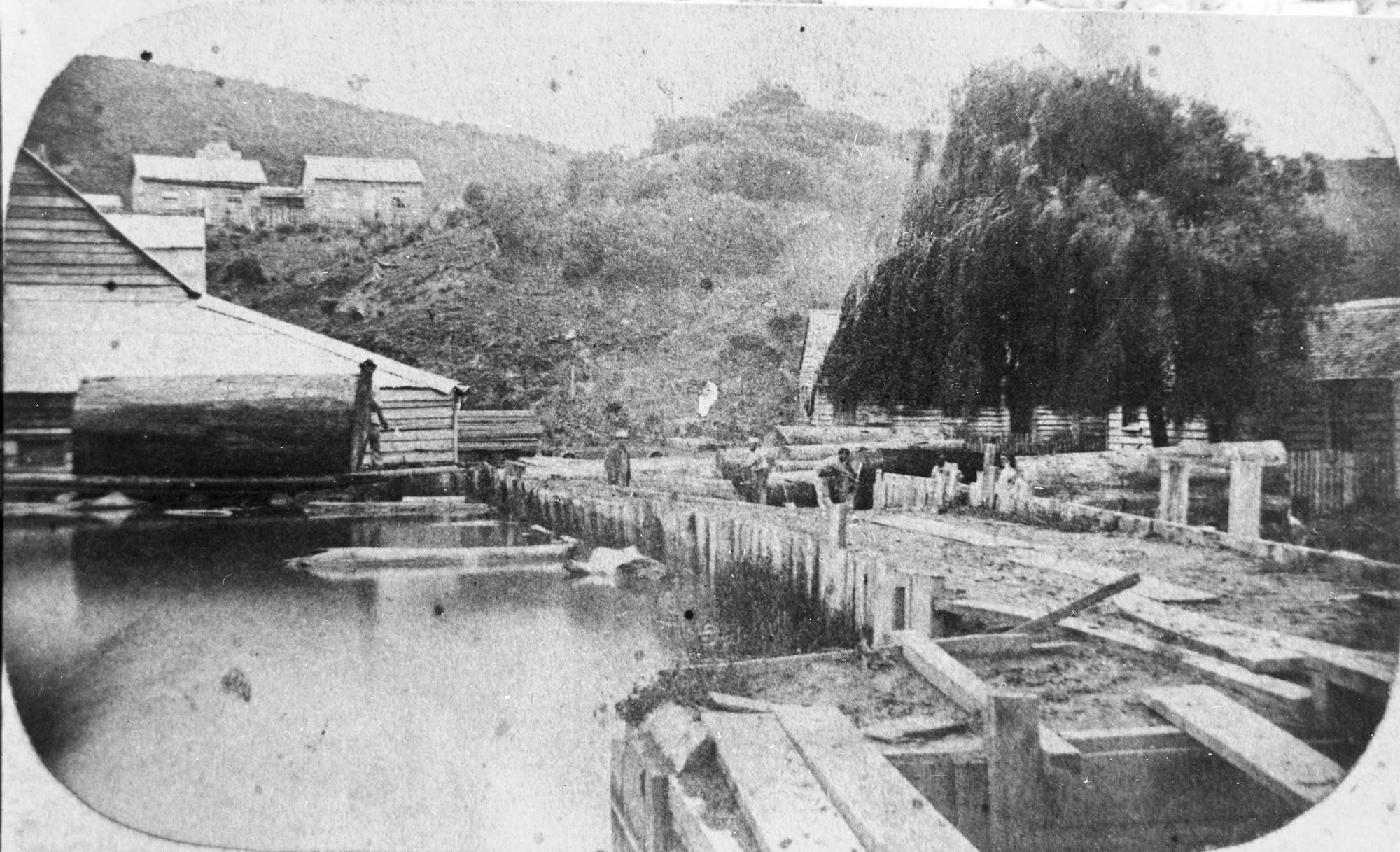
The Roe sawmill, pictured in the 1860s

In 1835 Australian timber merchant Thomas Mitchell, helped by William White of the English Wesleyan Mission, negotiated with Apihai Te Kawau for the purchase of 40,000 acres of land in return for less than 166 pound sterling, 1,000 pounds of tobacco, 100 dozen pipes, and six muskets. In 1836 Mitchell moved to the peninsula as the first permanent European resident in Auckland, however after establishing his timber mill, drowned months later. Captain William Cornwallis Symonds purchased the land from Mitchell's widow for 500 pounds, naming the area Cornwallis after his late uncle, Charles Cornwallis, 1st Marquess Cornwallis, former Viceroy of India. Te Kawau was dissatisfied with the purchase, as Māori had become more aware at the great inequalities between the land value and what they had been compensated for, as well as the state of the tobacco, which arrived mouldy, and had never been compensated for by Mitchell or Symonds. After the Treaty of Waitangi, Symonds purchased an additional 3,000 acres from Te Kawau for the settlement.

Symonds formed a company to create a large-scale settlement at Cornwallis, helped by partners Theophilus Heale, a British captain, and Dudley Sinclair, heir of Sir George Sinclair, who wanted to regain his family fortune through this venture. The three men attempted to establish Cornwallis Settlement in 1839 as a logging, trading and shipping settlement, subdividing 220 plots of land in the area. Cornwallis was advertised as an idyllic and fertile to Scottish settlers, and after 88 plots of land had been sold, the settler ship Brilliant left Glasgow in 1840. While the ship made its voyage, the colonial government examined Symonds pre-treaty deal with Ngāti Whātua, and was dissatisfied with the deal, only allowing settlers rights of occupancy of two years while a decision could be reached, and not allowing any logging to be done on the land.

After a 10-month journey, 31 settler families arrived at Cornwallis, finding no sign of settlement in the area. Māori who attended the Anglican mission on Āwhitu Peninsula to the south took pity at the settlers, helping them build 25 whare out of nīkau a day after the settlers arrived, with both Symonds and the Māori members of the mission supplying the settlers with wood and supplies for months, however no land grants to the settlers were made, resulting in anger. In November 1841 Symonds drowned, and the leadership of the settlement was taken up by Scottish settler Lachlan McLachlan, who had little information about Symonds' original settlement plans.

In May 1842 the steam sawmill arrived in Cornwallis, and a hotel named The Bird in the Hand (West Auckland's first) opened at the township to service the timber milling and shipping industries. Timber milling in the area was unsuccessful, due to the high cost compared to timber milled elsewhere (such as on Waiheke Island), and government restrictions on the size of timber that could be felled hampered efforts. By mid-1843, timber trade from Cornwallis had steeply fallen, with the hotel closing. Many settlers left the settlement, frustrated at a lack of land or income. In 1844, Lachlan McLachlan, frustrated at the company's lack of support for the settlers, challenged Sinclair to a duel, later confronting him in his home and beating him with a horsewhip. Sinclair committed suicide a few weeks after the incident. Later that year, the colonial government granted the settlers a quarter of the land originally bought by Symonds, taken from Crown holdings elsewhere in the region. Some of the early Cornwallis settler families moved to Onehunga after its establishment later in the 1840s.

In 1860 the Crown reduced the size of the company's land holdings to 1,927 acres around the Cornwallis Peninsula, after which Heale sold the steam mill boiler for use in the copper mine on Kawau Island. In February 1863 HMS Orpheus ran aground at a sandbar in the mouth of the Manukau Harbour, killing many of the sailors. John Kilgour and his wife Ellen nursed many of the survivors of the Orpheus at their home in Cornwallis. While ownership of the land was still disputed, a timber mill run by Matthew Roe operated out of the Kakamatua Inlet in the 1860s/1870s. Ownership of the peninsula was not settled until after the 1880s, when John McLachlan, Lachlan's son, purchased the land on the Cornwallis Peninsula.

When John McLachlan died in 1909 he gifted the land to the Auckland region as a public park. In 1919 a memorial was erected at the highest point of the peninsula in memory of McLachlan's mother Isabella and the Cornwallis settlers, which was struck by lightning and badly damaged in 1927.

=== Coastal holiday settlement ===
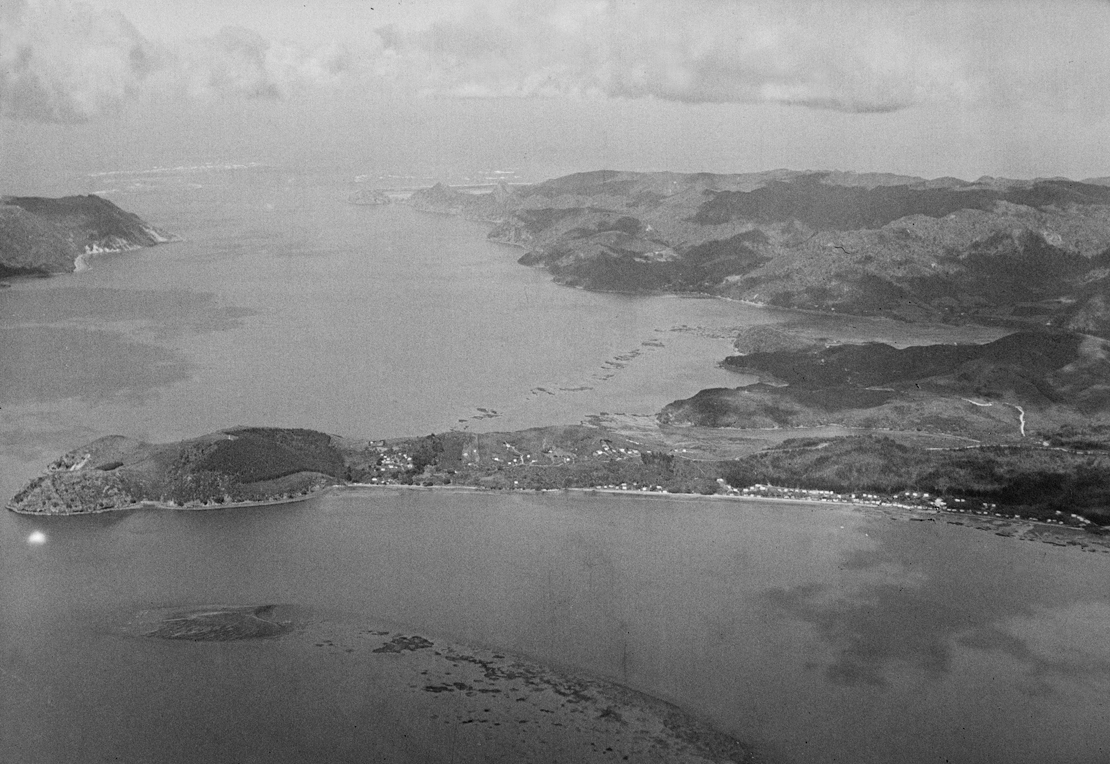
Cornwallis peninsula, circa 1940.

From 1917, the Auckland Council began allowing rental baches and holiday homes to be built near the shore at Cornwallis. In 1926, the Auckland Harbour Board built a wharf at Cornwallis, as a location where passengers travelling on the Manukau Harbour to Onehunga could safely disembark. By the 1950s and 60s, a thriving community of holidaymakers had developed, some living permanently in the baches. In April 1969, the Auckland City Council ended the rental agreement with the community, leading to legal disputes with the residents. By 1978, the final shoreside bach was removed.

In 1998 the original wharf was demolished, replaced in the following year with a 193-metre (633 ft) wharf, today a popular fishing spot. Cornwallis is the filming location for the Canadian/New Zealand drama The Sounds (2020).

== Demographics ==
Cornwallis covers 7.55 km^{2} (2.92 sq mi). It is part of the larger Waitakere Ranges South statistical area.

Historical population
Year	Pop.	±% p.a.
2006	153	—
2013	171	+1.60%
2018	159	−1.44%
2023	156	−0.38%
The 2006 population is for a smaller area of 6.70 km^{2}. Source:

Cornwallis had a population of 156 in the 2023 New Zealand census, a decrease of 3 people (−1.9%) since the 2018 census, and a decrease of 15 people (−8.8%) since the 2013 census. There were 84 males and 72 females in 63 dwellings. 1.9% of people identified as LGBTIQ+. The median age was 55.4 years (compared with 38.1 years nationally). There were 15 people (9.6%) aged under 15 years, 24 (15.4%) aged 15 to 29, 84 (53.8%) aged 30 to 64, and 33 (21.2%) aged 65 or older.

People could identify as more than one ethnicity. The results were 90.4% European (Pākehā); 9.6% Māori; 5.8% Pasifika; 7.7% Asian; 3.8% Middle Eastern, Latin American and African New Zealanders (MELAA); and 3.8% other, which includes people giving their ethnicity as "New Zealander". English was spoken by 96.2%, Māori language by 1.9%, and other languages by 11.5%. No language could be spoken by 3.8% (e.g. too young to talk). The percentage of people born overseas was 28.8, compared with 28.8% nationally.

Religious affiliations were 23.1% Christian, 1.9% Māori religious beliefs, 1.9% Buddhist, 1.9% New Age, and 5.8% other religions. People who answered that they had no religion were 57.7%, and 9.6% of people did not answer the census question.

Of those at least 15 years old, 54 (38.3%) people had a bachelor's or higher degree, 66 (46.8%) had a post-high school certificate or diploma, and 18 (12.8%) people exclusively held high school qualifications. The median income was $30,400, compared with $41,500 nationally. 12 people (8.5%) earned over $100,000 compared to 12.1% nationally. The employment status of those at least 15 was that 63 (44.7%) people were employed full-time, 24 (17.0%) were part-time, and 3 (2.1%) were unemployed.
