= The Sounds (TV series) =

Canadian-New Zealand television mystery drama series

- Genre: Psychological thriller
- Created by: Sarah-Kate Lynch
- Directed by: Peter Stebbings
- Starring: Matt Whelan; Rachelle Lefevre
- Composer: Rhian Sheehan
- Countries of origin: Canada; New Zealand
- Original language: English
- No. of seasons: 1
- No. of episodes: 8

Production
- Executive producers: Kelly Martin; Sally Campbell; Christina Jennings; Scott Garvie; Peter Stebbings
- Production companies: Shaftesbury Films; South Pacific Pictures; Acorn Media Enterprises

Original release
- Network: Neon (New Zealand); CBC (Canada)
- Release: September 3 – October 12, 2020

The Sounds is a Canadian-New Zealand co-produced television mystery drama series that premiered on Acorn TV and CBC Television in 2020. The series stars Matt Whelan and Rachelle Lefevre as Tom and Maggie Cabbott, a Canadian couple who move to the Pelorus Sound / Te Hoiere region of New Zealand to escape family drama, only for Tom to go missing. The series was created by New Zealand writer Sarah-Kate Lynch, and directed by Peter Stebbings. It is a coproduction of South Pacific Pictures and Shaftesbury Films.

The series premiered on September 3, 2020 on Acorn TV and Neon, and on October 5, 2020 on CBC Television.

== Cast ==
- Matt Whelan as Tom Cabbott
- Rachelle Lefevre as Maggie Cabbott
- Matt Nable as Jack McGregor
- Emily Piggford as Esther Ishikawa
- Peter Elliott as Stuart McGregor
- Anna-Maree Thomas as Zoe McGregor
- Vanessa Rare as Pania Cottle

== Episodes ==
No.	Title	Directed by	Written by	Original release date	Viewers (millions)
1	"Open Water"	Peter Stebbings	Sarah-Kate Lynch	September 3, 2020	N/A
2	"Find the Money"	Peter Stebbings	Sarah-Kate Lynch & Timothy Balme	September 3, 2020	N/A
3	"Not Tom"	Peter Stebbings	Sarah-Kate Lynch	September 7, 2020	N/A
4	"Playing the Odds"	Peter Stebbings	Sarah-Kate Lynch, Joss King & Timothy Balme	September 14, 2020	N/A
5	"Not For Sale"	Peter Stebbings	Sarah-Kate Lynch, Timothy Balme & Harry McNaughton	September 21, 2020	N/A
6	"Stick to the Plan"	Peter Stebbings	Sarah-Kate Lynch	September 28, 2020	N/A
7	"Help"	Peter Stebbings	Sarah-Kate Lynch, Kathryn Burnett & Harry McNaughton	October 5, 2020	N/A
8	"Make Amends"	Peter Stebbings	Sarah-Kate Lynch & Joss King	October 12, 2020	N/A

== Production ==
The Sounds was filmed in early 2020 on location in the coastal settlements of Huia and Cornwallis in the Waitākere Ranges, Auckland and at Whangaroa Harbour in Northland, New Zealand. It was a co-production of South Pacific Pictures and Shaftesbury Films.
