= The Elephant Princess =

- Opening title
- Genre: Children's television series Fantasy; Action
- Created by: Jonathan M. Shiff
- Directed by: Roger Hodgman; Daniel Nettheim; Colin Budds; Grant Brown
- Starring: Emily Robins; Miles Szanto; Siam; Maddy Tyres; Eka Darville (series 2); Emelia Burns; Georgina Haig (series 2); Richard Brancatisano (series 2)
- Theme music composer: Pete Dacy & Jason Bond
- Opening theme: "Two Worlds Forever", performed by Emily Robins and Maddy Tyres
- Ending theme: "Two Worlds Forever"
- Composers: Ricky Edwards; Ric Formosa
- Countries of origin: Australia; New Zealand
- Original language: English
- No. of seasons: 2
- No. of episodes: 52 (list of episodes)

Production
- Executive producers: Jonathan M. Shiff; Julia Adams
- Producers: Jonathan M. Shiff; Joanna Werner
- Cinematography: Darrell Martin (series 1); Zenon Sawko (series 2)
- Editors: Philip Watts; Wayne Hyett; Nathan Wild; Geoff Lamb; Rohan Cooper
- Camera setup: Single-camera
- Running time: 30 minutes
- Production company: Jonathan M. Shiff Productions

Original release
- Network: Network Ten
- Release: 13 November 2008 – 6 October 2011

The Elephant Princess is an Australian children's television series that first screened on Network Ten in 2008. The series is produced by Jonathan M. Shiff Productions. A second season began screening in 2011. The series revolves around Alexandra Wilson, a suburban Australian teenage girl, who discovers she is the heiress to the throne of Manjipur, a fictional Indian kingdom.

== Summary ==
Alexandra Wilson thinks she is an average suburban girl living in Melbourne, until her 16th birthday, when exotic visitor, Kuru, shows up in her backyard with a magical elephant, Anala. He informs her she is the heiress to the throne of the magical Indian kingdom of Manjipur. With his help, the reluctant princess will master her magic powers and defend her royal inheritance against her devious cousin, Vashan, whilst balancing the pull of both worlds to find her true destiny.

In the second season, Alex and her family have moved to the Gold Coast. Her friend Amanda has followed her there, where they attend university and plan to find a new drummer for their band. Meanwhile, in Manjipur, Diva has returned to take over Manjipur and learn the secrets of The Book.

== Episodes ==
Series	Episodes	Originally released	
Series	Episodes	First released	Last released
1	26	13 November 2008	24 May 2009
2	26	6 February 2011 (Canada)	6 October 2011 (Canada)

== Cast ==
=== Main ===
- Emily Robins, as Alexandra Wilson, is the main protagonist of this series and the princess of Manjipur. Sometimes she sleeps in, is messy now and again, and sometimes forgets to do her homework. In other words, she is a normal teenage girl, living in a very normal suburb. Alex is sometimes short tempered and carefree, but is still a loyal person. Ask her what she really wants in life, and she will say she wants her band to be big! In the second episode, her full/birth name was revealed to be Liliuokalani Parasha Kaled Persephone Amanirenas.
- Miles Szanto, as Kuru, is Alex's faithful servant, who always tries to protect her. He was sent from Manjipur along with Anala to teach Alex about her magical powers and prepare her to become a princess. At first, he did not really fit in well, but he soon adjusted to Earth.
- Siam, as Anala, is the royal elephant of Manjipur. She can magically disappear. Though Anala can be stubborn at times, she is still loyal to Alex.
- Maddy Tyers, as Amanda (recurring, season 1; main, season 2), is Alex's fashion-obsessed best friend. Like Alex, she is one of the lead singers of the band. At first, when Alex told JB and her about her secret, because they saw Anala, they thought that she was joking. When she proved it to them by doing a magic trick with a lot of bunnies and Anala appearing out of nowhere, though, they believed her. She falls for Taylor in season two when they go to the Gold Coast of Australia and become a band.
- Eka Darville, as Taylor (season 2), is a close friend of Alex and Amanda's. When he discovered Alex's secret, he almost had the same reactions as Amanda and JB, but he was okay with it. He is Amanda's boyfriend and plays the drums in their band. He is very caring and a loyal friend. He appeared in all episodes of season two.
- Emelia Burns, as Diva (recurring, season 1; main, season 2), was Vashan's "assistant" in season one. At the final battle, she revealed that she was a 600-year-old witch to Vashan and the others by using her powers on them. When she learns that her magic gives her great power, she threatens Alex's rule of Manjipur.
- Georgina Haig, as Zamira (season 2), is Caleb's younger sister and a childhood friend of Kuru's. She takes an instant dislike to Alex, because she believes that her mother was killed by Alex's mother. In the end, Diva was found to be the murderer.
- Richard Brancatisano, as Caleb (season 2), is Zamira's older brother and Alex's love interest in series two. At first, he tries to flirt with Alex, but she finds it annoying, but soon she spends time with him, being that she visits Manjipur often and he works there. Soon, the two develop a bond, forming an up-and-down relationship with so much drama in it. Caleb is a character from the Australian children's television series The Elephant Princess. He is portrayed as a good-looking young man who becomes increasingly torn between his allegiance to the witch Diva and his affection for Alex. Caleb's character adds complexity to the storyline, as he navigates the challenges of his dual loyalties while trying to win Alex's heart.

=== Supporting ===
- Sebastian Gregory, as JB (season 1), was best friends and bandmates with Alex and Amanda. He can be described as desperate and girl crazy. He is not mentioned in season two.
- Damien Bodie, as Vashan (season 1), is Alex's evil-minded cousin. He has tried a variety of ways to destroy Alex or take away the transporting jewel from Anala. He frequently taunted Alex in season one. At the end of the season, he had his powers taken away by Diva. He does not return in season two.
- Liam Hemsworth, as Marcus (season 1, 18 episodes), is Alex's former crush and boyfriend in season one. He joined Alex's band and adjusted well into it. Kuru took an instant dislike to him as Alex and his relationship was near the end of it. Though Marcus is caring and thoughtful, he would always get jealous and suspicious of Kuru. That is what led to his and Alex's breakup. He was not mentioned in season two or after his departure from the show.
- Diana Glenn (season 1) and Chelsea Dunkley (season 2), as Queen Nefari, the late queen of Manjipur and Alex's biological mother.
- Brett Climo, as Omar, Nefari's advisor and Alex's biological father (season 1)
- Alyce Platt, as Anita Wilson, Alex's adoptive mother (season 1)
- Grant Piro, as Jim Wilson, Alex's adoptive father (season 1).
- Eva Lazzaro, as Zoe Wilson, Alex's adoptive younger sister and Jim and Anita's biological daughter (season 1).
- Sue Jones as Isha (season 1, 7 episodes)
- Alexandra Park as Veronica (season 2)
- Sebastian Angborn as Senq (season 2)
- Cleopatra Coleman as Cosma (4 episodes)
- Margot Robbie, as Juliet, Diva's magical alter ego (season 1, 2 episodes)
- Victoria Eagger as Maha (4 episodes)

== Multimedia ==
=== DVD releases ===
The complete first and second series have been released in three volumes, although the complete seasons one and two have been released, too.

Title	Release date	Episodes
The Elephant Princess Vol. 1 – Welcome to the Fairytale	3 April 2009	1."Coming of Age", 2."Don't Call Me Princess", 3."Rabbit Season", 4."Kuru the Guru" 5."The Powerful Ballad", 6."Not Made in Japan", 7."Lean on Me", 8."Welcome to the Fairytale", 9."Warts and All"
The Elephant Princess Vol. 2 – The Big Gig	2 September 2009	10."The Butterfly Effect", 11."Butterfly Kiss", 12."Dancing Queen", 13."Destiny's Child" 14."Time After Time", 15."Happy Birthday Anala", 16."The Big Gig", 17."Masquerade Ball"
The Elephant Princess Vol. 3 – Almost Too Famous	10 March 2010	18."Almost Too Famous", 19."Princess Amanda", 20."Courtroom Jewel", 21."Sea Change" 22."Revelation", 23."It's an Ordinary Life", 24."Unexpected Arrivals", 25."Good Vibrations", 26."Normal Alex Wilson"
The Elephant Princess – Complete Series 1	2 June 2010	1."Coming of Age", 2."Don't Call Me Princess", 3."Rabbit Season", 4."Kuru the Guru", 5."The Powerful Ballad" 6."Not Made in Japan", 7."Lean on Me", 8."Welcome to the Fairytale", 9."Warts and All" 10."The Butterfly Effect" 11."Butterfly Kiss", 12."Dancing Queen", 13."Destiny's Child", 14."Time After Time", 15."Happy Birthday Anala" 16."The Big Gig", 17."Masquerade Ball" 18."Almost Too Famous", 19."Princess Amanda", 20."Courtroom Jewel" 21."Sea Change", 22."Revelation", 23."It's an Ordinary Life", 24."Unexpected Arrivals", 25."Good Vibrations" 26."Normal Alex Wilson"
The Elephant Princess – Complete Series 2	TBA	1."Enemies Unleashed", 2."The New Recruit", 3."Bad Reputation", 4."Falling for the Enemy", 5."Star Crossed Lovers" 6."Double Trouble", 7."Secret Love", 8."Love Your Enemy", 9."The Secret Admirer", 10."Tangled Web" 11."Welcome to My World", 12."Exposed", 13."Exiles", 14."Trouble Comes To Town", 15."Under New Management" 16."Dangerous Secrets", 17."Feud", 18."Reinforcements", 19."Unmasked", 20."A Princess For All" 21."Out of Control", 22."Flare Up", 23."Cursed", 24."Hunted", 25."Between The Worlds" 26."Sacrifice"

== International broadcasts ==
- Australia: "The Elephant Princess", Network Ten
- Brazil: "Alexandra, a Princesa do Rock", Nickelodeon (Portuguese)
- Belgium: "The Elephant Princess", Ketnet
- Bulgaria: "Принцесата на слоновете" BTV Comedy
- Canada: "The Elephant Princess", Family Channel
- Chile: "Alexandra, La Princesa del Rock", Nickelodeon and Megavisión
- Finland: "Elefanttiprinsessa" YLE Areena
- France: "Son Altesse Alex" Gulli, Nickelodeon
- Germany: "Elephant Princess – Zurück nach Manjipur" (1. season) & "Elephant Princess – Die Rettung von Manjipur" (2. season) ZDF
- Hungary: "Elefánt hercegnő", Nickelodeon
- India: "The Elephant Princess", Disney Channel
- Israel: "Nesichath HaPilim", Israeli Kids Channel
- Italy: "Elephant Princess", Rai 3
- Netherlands: "The Elephant Princess", Z@PP
- Norway: "Elefant Prinsessen", Nrk Super
- Pakistan: "The Elephant Princess", Nickelodeon Pakistan
- Poland: "Księżniczka z Krainy Słoni", Nickelodeon Poland
- Portugal: "A Princesa Elefante", SIC and Nickelodeon
- Romania: "Printesa din Taramul Elefantilor", Nickelodeon
- Russia: "Принцесса слонов", Carousel and Nickelodeon Russia
- South Africa: "The Elephant Princess" Nickelodeon/DStv
- Sweden: "Elefantprinsessan", SVT Barnkanalen, Nickelodeon
- Spain: "La princesa elefante", Disney Channel
- Sri Lanka: "හස්ති කුමරිය" ("Hasthi Kumariya"), TV Derana
- Ukraine: "Слон і принцеса", TET
- United Kingdom: "The Rock Princess" (Previously "The Elephant Princess"), Nickelodeon
- United States: "The Elephant Princess", Primo TV
- Uruguay, Paraguay, Mexico, Argentina, Venezuela, Colombia, Peru: "Alexandra, La Princesa del Rock", Canal 5, Nickelodeon
- Vietnam: "Nàng công chúa bí ẩn", HTV3 Vietnam

== See also ==
- Naagin
