= 3 Mile Limit =

- Directed by: Craig Newland
- Written by: Craig Newland; Andrew Gunn
- Produced by: Craig Newland
- Starring: Matt Whelan; Dan Musgrove; Belinda Crawley; David Aston; James Crompton; Elliot Wrightson
- Release date: 6 March 2014
- Running time: 105 minutes
- Country: New Zealand
- Language: English

3 Mile Limit (alternatively titled 1480: Radio Pirates) is a 2014 New Zealand drama film directed by Craig Newland, starring Matt Whelan, Dan Musgrove, Belinda Crawley, David Aston, James Crompton and Elliot Wrightson. It is based on the rise of Radio Hauraki.

== Cast ==
- Matt Whelan as Richard
- Dan Musgrove as Nick
- Belinda Crawley as Judy
- David Aston as Willis
- James Crompton as Morrie
- Elliot Wrightson as Alex
- Carl Dixon as Brendon
- Jordan Mooney as Paul
- Daniel Cresswell as Tim
- John McKee as Frank
- David Capstick as Clive
- Jonny Hair as Barry
- Bruce Hopkins as McGrath
- George Mason as Bobbie

== Reception ==
Elias Savada of Film Threat wrote a positive review of the film.

The New Zealand Herald rated the film 3 stars out of 5 and called it a "Tidy but colourless adaptation of a rocking good story".

Graeme Tuckett of Stuff wrote that while the cast, especially Whelan and Crawley, "give it their all", the film is "without credible dialogue, better drawn characters, and a bit more confidence and swagger in the directors' chair".
