= Graham Bell (police officer) =

New Zealand police officer and TV presenter (1946–2025)

Graham Bell QSM
- Born: Graham John Bell; 24 December 1946; Frankton, New Zealand
- Died: 7 October 2025 (aged 78); Hamilton, New Zealand
- Occupations: Police officer; television presenter
- Known for: Police Ten 7

Graham John Bell QSM (24 December 1946 – 7 October 2025) was a New Zealand police officer and television presenter. He was a police officer for 33 years, and had roles as a spokesperson in the 1980s as well as detective inspector in the 1990s, investigating several murder cases. After his retirement from the New Zealand Police in 2001, he hosted the true-crime television show Police Ten 7 from 2002 to 2015.

== Early life ==
Bell was born on 24 December 1946, and grew up in the Hamilton suburb of Frankton. After early employment on the railways, and as a truck driver, he applied to join the New Zealand Police in 1967, following his grandfather and a number of cousins into the force.

== Police career ==
Bell served as a police officer across the North Island for 33 years, retiring in 2001. As a senior sergeant in the 1980s, he was a spokesperson for Auckland police. He rose to the rank of detective inspector, leading investigations into several high-profile cases during the 1990s, including the murders of Beverley Bouma in 1998 and police constable Murray Stretch a year later. They were among the 19 murder cases he investigated during his career.

In 1997, Bell was involved in the Operation Rifle investigation into Tāme Iti, which resulted from a related investigation into a stolen Colin McCahon painting. When interviewed prior to retirement in 2001, he mentioned the 1978 rape and murder of 10-year-old Delphina Phillips in Ohakune as a particularly troubling case he had worked on.

Bell was honoured with a Queen's Service Medal, for public services, in the 2001 Queen's Birthday Honours.

== Broadcasting ==
In 2002, Bell began hosting the true-crime television show Police Ten 7, after his involvement in a documentary on the investigation into the Bouma case. The show followed police officers on the job, as well as profiling wanted offenders and asking the public for help. Bell's presenting style was described as "straight-shooting", and he was known for his one-liners and colourful descriptions of perpetrators. He hosted the show for 13 years, before being replaced by Rob Lemoto in 2015. When the show was accused by Efeso Collins of promoting racist stereotypes, Bell defended the show, saying, "It's an unfortunate fact that certain sectors of our society are grossly over-represented in the crime statistics". After the show's cancellation in 2023, he described it as a victim of "wokeness and political correctness".

In 2019, Bell featured in the true-crime documentary series Who Killed Lucy the Poodle?, about an incident in Rotorua in 1986 in which a circus lion killed a poodle.

== Personal life and death ==
Bell was married for 57 years, and had three children; one of his daughters following in his stead as a police officer.

In 2008, Bell published an autobiography, Murder, Mayhem and Mischief.

Bell died of cancer at a hospice in Hamilton on 7 October 2025, at the age of 78. He was eulogised by the police commissioner, Richard Chambers, as "a bit of a legend when it comes to policing in New Zealand".
