= Philly de Lacey =

New Zealand television producer

Philly de Lacey is a New Zealand television producer and media executive. She is chief executive officer of production company Screentime New Zealand.

== Biography ==
De Lacey was born and raised in Auckland and studied psychology, with a minor in film and television, at the University of Auckland. On graduating, she spent a year at South Seas Film & Television School and then began working in television production. In 2003 she became producer of the reality crime show Police Ten 7.

In 2006, de Lacey was appointed Screentime's managing director and head of production. In 2010, she was named executive director of the Screentime Group.

=== Awards and recognition ===
- Images & Sound Award for Success in Television at 2016 Women in Film and Television New Zealand Awards
- Independent Producer of the Year at 2015 SPADA Screen Industry Awards (Screen Production and Development Association, New Zealand)
