= Andrew Grainger =

New Zealand actor (born 1965)

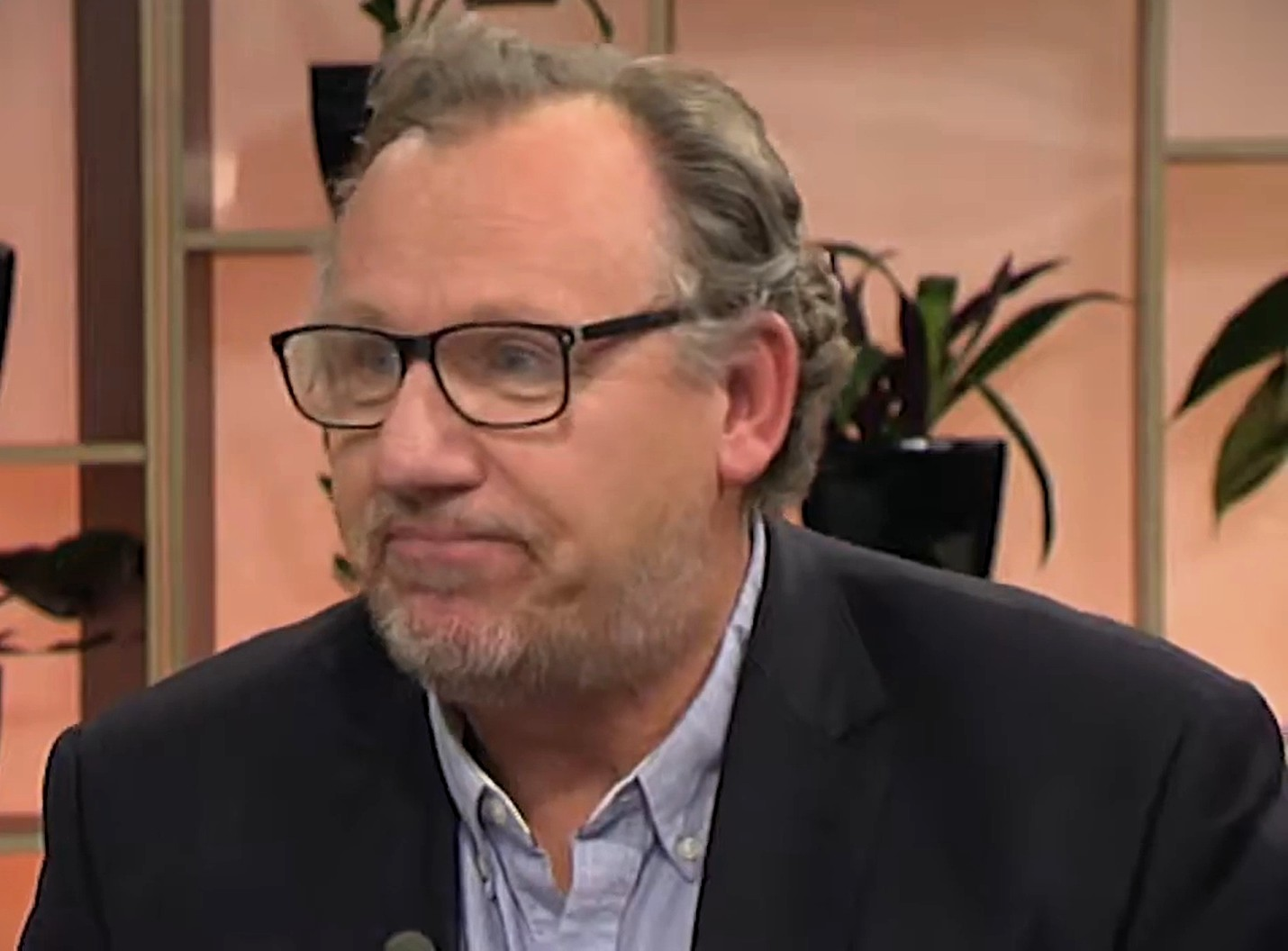
- Grainger in 2018
- Born: 1965 (age 60–61); United Kingdom
- Occupation: Actor
- Years active: 1987–present
- Partner: Sacha Hickman (née Williams)
- Children: 2

Andrew Grainger (born 1965) is an English theatre and film actor. A native of the United Kingdom, Grainger moved to Castor Bay, Auckland, New Zealand in 2007, where he is active in both theatre and television productions, but continues to appear regularly on British television, as he has since he launched his career.

== Theatre ==
"Andy Grainger", as he was initially credited, formulated an acting career through his love of musicals and theatre. He began a West End theatre acting, dancing and singing career in 1987 at age 22 at the Prince of Wales Theatre playing "Benjamin" in a stage and road production of Seven Brides for Seven Brothers, directed by Michael Winter, and in 1990 playing "Lt. Buzz Adams" in South Pacific, directed by Roger Redfarm. He also portrayed "Dr. Orin" in a 1994 production of A Little Shop of Horrors at the Oldham Coliseum Theatre directed by Lindsay Dolan.

Since then, he has appeared regularly in such venues as the Hull Truck Theatre, London Palladium, King's Head Theatre, Silo Theatre and the Auckland Theatre Company.

In 2013, he appeared as "Geoff Tordoff" in a production of The Heretic with the Auckland Theatre Company.

== Television and films ==
Grainger has participated in over 60 British television series and films in his career, among them The Bill, Rosemary and Thyme, Heartbeat, Bad Girls and EastEnders. In New Zealand he has appeared in local programmes Shortland Street, Outrageous Fortune, The Million Dollar Con Man, Life's A Riot and The Cult. He has received recognition for a variety of worldwide television commercial appearances, as well as a role in the first season of Ash vs Evil Dead in 2015.

Among the feature films he has appeared in are Parting Shots (1999), In the Beginning (2000), Large (2001), Spy Game (2001), Mean Machine (2001), Kiss Me Deadly (2008) and The Lovely Bones (2009).

== Personal life ==
Grainger moved to New Zealand in 2006 to start a family with his wife, Sacha. Living near Waiake Beach in Torbay, they have two children. "I think in life if you have an opportunity to try things new you should embrace them, and the lifestyle here is fantastic."
