= Emelia Burns =

Australian actress

- Born: Emelia Jane Burns; 18 February 1982 (age 44); Brisbane, Queensland, Australia
- Occupations: Actress; Singer
- Years active: 2004–present
- Height: 166 cm (5 ft 5 in)

Emelia Jane Burns (born 18 February 1982) is an Australian actress, who has had roles in films and television series.

== Films ==
Burns appeared in the 2007 action film The Condemned, written and directed by Scott Wiper, as Yasantwa, a convict on death row from Ghana, transported to a remote island to compete in an illegal human hunting television show. Burns also appeared in the 2011 horror movie Don't Be Afraid of the Dark.

== Television ==
Burns is well known for her role as Diva, in two seasons of the children's television series The Elephant Princess. She has also appeared on The Starter Wife as Mudawa, Sea Patrol as Zuraya, the children's television series H_{2}O: Just Add Water, and in MTV's The Shannara Chronicles as Commander Tilton.

== Filmography ==
=== Film ===
Year	Title	Role	Notes
2007	The Condemned	Yasantwa Adei	
2010	Don't Be Afraid of the Dark	Caterer	

=== Television ===
Year	Title	Role	Notes
2006	H_{2}O: Just Add Water	Nurse	"Under the Weather"
2007	The Starter Wife	Mudawa	"Hour 1"
2008	Sea Patrol	Zuraya	"Rules of Engagement"
2008–11	The Elephant Princess	Diva	Main role
2011	Terra Nova	Cpl. Reilly	Recurring role
2013–14	Neighbours	Mandy Edwards	3 episodes
2015	Childhood's End	Ch 5 Reporter	"The Overlords"
2016	The Shannara Chronicles	Commander Diana Tilton	Recurring role
2018	Ash vs Evil Dead	Zoe	4 episodes
