= Chelsie Preston Crayford =

New Zealand actress (born 1987)

- Born: Chelsie Florence Preston Crayford; 1987 (age 38–39); Wellington, New Zealand
- Education: Wellington East Girls' College; Wellington High School; Toi Whakaari
- Occupation: Actress
- Years active: 1991-present
- Parent(s): Gaylene Preston and Jonathan Crayford
- Awards: Logie Award for Most Outstanding Newcomer (2012)

Chelsie Florence Preston Crayford (born 1987), sometimes credited as Chelsie Florence, is a New Zealand actress.

== Early life ==
Preston Crayford was born in Wellington to film maker Gaylene Preston and musician Jonathan Crayford. Apart from appearing in a water safety commercial at the age of four, her acting debut was at the age of 13 in the New Zealand-made TV series A Twist in the Tale starring William Shatner. Several years later, her performance in a stage production was praised by Ian McKellen, encouraging her to pursue an acting career and enroll in the Toi Whakaari national drama school from 2006 to 2008. She graduated in 2008 with a Bachelor of Performing Arts.

== Career ==
Preston Crayford played a guest role in the soap opera Shortland Street in 2003, and made her feature film debut in the comedy Eagle vs Shark in 2007. In 2009, she played a major role in the TV series The Cult. In 2011, she played brothel madam Tilly Devine in the Australian crime drama Underbelly: Razor, a role for which she won the Graham Kennedy Award for Most Outstanding Newcomer at the 2012 Logie Awards.

Since then she has appeared in an ABC TV adaptation of The Mystery of a Hansom Cab, in Hope and Wire (a mini-series produced by her mother about the 2010 Canterbury earthquake), government communications advisor Sophie Walsh in the Australian techno-thriller The Code, and as the Sorceress Kaya in the third season of Ash vs Evil Dead.

She portrayed suffragette Annabella Maktelow (1871–1963) in Hot Words and Bold Retorts (2018), a short film directed by her mother Gaylene Preston. She wrote, directed, and starred in the short film Falling Up (2018).

Preston Crayford also starred as Melissa Flowers in Dark City: The Cleaner, a television adaptation of crime fiction writer Paul Cleave's novel The Cleaner.

In 2022, she made an appearance in the science fiction horror film, M3GAN. In 2024, she began starring as the detective protagonist, Anais Mallory in the crime drama series, A Remarkable Place to Die.

Chelsie released her first feature film Caterpillar in 2026.

== Personal life ==
Preston Crayford has one child, a daughter, with her ex-partner, cinematographer Ray Edwards. She has one child, born September 2025, with her current partner, comedian Guy Montgomery.
