= Ashes to Ashes (Ash vs Evil Dead) =

- Ash vs Evil Dead episode
- Episode no.: Season 1 Episode 8
- Directed by: Tony Tilse
- Written by: Michael J. Bassett
- Cinematography by: Dave Garbett
- Editing by: Tom Eagles
- Original release date: December 19, 2015
- Running time: 29 minutes

Guest appearances
- Samara Weaving as Heather; Indiana Evans as Melissa; Ido Drent as Brad; Rebekkah Farrell as Linda

Episode chronology
← Previous "Fire in the Hole"	Next → "Bound in Flesh"

"Ashes to Ashes" is the eighth episode of the first season of the American comedy horror television series Ash vs Evil Dead, which serves as a continuation of the Evil Dead trilogy. The episode was written by Michael J. Bassett, and directed by Tony Tilse. It originally aired on the premium channel Starz on December 19, 2015.

The series is set 30 years after the events of the Evil Dead trilogy, and follows Ash Williams, who now works at the "Value Stop" as a simple stock boy. Having spent his life not doing anything remarkable since the events of the trilogy, Ash will have to renounce his routine existence and become a hero once more by taking up arms and facing the titular Evil Dead. In the episode, Ash returns to the cabin after 30 years, intending to finish everything by himself.

According to Nielsen Media Research, the episode was seen by an estimated 0.465 million household viewers and gained a 0.18 ratings share among adults aged 18–49. The episode received generally positive reviews from critics, who praised the performances, references to the movies and emotional weight, although the pacing received criticism.

== Plot ==
In the woods, Ash (Bruce Campbell) has reached the cabin, for the first time in 30 years. As he is about to enter, he finds that Amanda (Jill Marie Jones) has followed him, unwilling to let him go alone. Although reluctant, he allows her to accompany him.

Inside the cabin, Amanda is unable to open the locked cellar, so Ash leaves for the shed to find a crowbar. However, Ash is suddenly locked inside, where he is taunted by the severed head of his old girlfriend Linda (Rebekkah Farrell). She causes saw blades and a bear trap to attack Ash. Meanwhile, while looking for Ash, Pablo (Ray Santiago) and Kelly (Dana DeLorenzo) are lost in the woods. They are discovered by a group of Australian hikers consisting of Brad (Ido Drent), Melissa (Indiana Evans), and Heather (Samara Weaving). The group claims to have passed a cabin and take them there.

Back in the cabin, Amanda investigates the place, finding Raymond Knowby's tape recorder as well as a book detailing the Necronomicon. She is approached by Ash, who claims they need to leave the cabin. However, Amanda notes that he now has a right hand, which is rotting. Recognizing he is not Ash, she flees from the room. He catches her and brutally attacks her. Taking a cleaver, she chops off the hand, smashing it into pieces. Despite this, he stabs her with the cleaver and then kills her by impaling her on the antlers of a dead head.

Losing his mechanical hand, Ash finally smashes Linda's head and manages to escape from the shed. He returns to the cabin, where he stays with Amanda as she dies. The imposter Ash mocks him before leaving. Pablo and Kelly arrive, shocked to find Amanda's corpse. Ash tells them that another version of himself killed her and sets out to find him. He is attacked by the imposter Ash in another room and both fight, with both using their knowledge of the other to their advantage. The episode ends as both versions choke each other.

== Production ==
=== Development ===
The episode was written by Michael J. Bassett, and directed by Tony Tilse. It was Bassett's first writing credit, and Tilse's first directorial credit.

== Reception ==
=== Viewers ===
In its original American broadcast, "Ashes to Ashes" was seen by an estimated 0.465 million household viewers and gained a 0.18 ratings share among adults aged 18–49, according to Nielsen Media Research. This means that 0.18 percent of all households with televisions watched the episode. This was a slight increase in viewership from the previous episode, which was watched by 0.452 million viewers with a 0.18 in the 18-49 demographics.

=== Critical reviews ===
"Ashes to Ashes" received generally positive reviews from critics. Matt Fowler of IGN gave the episode a "good" 7.8 out of 10 rating and wrote in his verdict, "'Ashes to Ashes' delivered big on nostalgia and action (and gore!), but also suffered from a few, regrettable momentum killers." Michael Roffman of The A.V. Club gave the episode an "A–" grade and wrote, "It's an intriguing reunion and one we've been waiting for all season of Ash Vs. Evil Dead — and the setup couldn't go better."

Gina McIntyre of Entertainment Weekly wrote, "Talk about confronting your demons. Ash faced his own troubled past tonight, going back to the cabin where it all began. And while he found himself there — or, at least, a version of himself — that didn't exactly turn out to be such a good thing. At least he made it out alive, which is more than we can say for Amanda." Stephen Harber of Den of Geek gave the episode a 3 star rating out of 5 and wrote, "Speaking as a Evil Dead fan who grew up watching the classic trilogy over and over again, I had to think long and hard about this week's episode to figure out what my thoughts are on it. Having watched 'Ashes to Ashes' a couple times now, it's clear that it might cause a stir amongst more than a few hardcore Deadites."

Carissa Pavlica of TV Fanatic gave the episode a 4.5 star rating out of 5 and wrote, "Unfortunately, returning to the cabin only brought bad news for the characters on 'Ashes to Ashes', but if you're a fan of the comedic aspects of the series, then it was all good times for you." Jasef Wisener of TV Overmind wrote, "'Ashes to Ashes' was an absolute nostalgia trip that turned all of my expectations about what was to come in the series on its head, and I love the fact that this show is continuously able to surprise me in wonderful and unexpected ways." Blair Marnell of Nerdist wrote, "Aside from the issues of Amanda's character development, 'Ashes to Ashes' was the first episode to really sell the stakes of Ash vs. Evil Dead. It's always been a comedy, but now there's some actual drama as well."
