= The Morgue (Ash vs Evil Dead) =

- Ash vs Evil Dead episode
- Episode no.: Season 2 Episode 2
- Directed by: Tony Tilse
- Written by: Cameron Welsh
- Cinematography by: Dave Garbett
- Editing by: Allanah Bazzard
- Original release date: October 9, 2016
- Running time: 26 minutes

Guest appearances
- Lee Majors as Brock Williams; Stephen Lovatt as Sheriff Thomas Emery; Carmen Duncan as Lillian Pendergrass

Episode chronology
← Previous "Home"	Next → "Last Call"

"The Morgue" is the second episode of the second season of the American comedy horror television series Ash vs Evil Dead, which serves as a continuation of the Evil Dead trilogy. It is the twelfth overall episode of the series and was written by Cameron Welsh, and directed by Tony Tilse. It originally aired on the premium channel Starz on October 9, 2016.

The series is set 30 years after the events of the Evil Dead trilogy, and follows Ash Williams, who now works at the "Value Stop" as a simple stock boy. Having spent his life not doing anything remarkable since the events of the trilogy, Ash will have to renounce his routine existence and become a hero once more by taking up arms and facing the titular Evil Dead. In the episode, Ash and Kelly sneak into the morgue to retrieve the Necronomicon from a corpse, while Pablo looks for answers regarding his visions.

According to Nielsen Media Research, the episode was seen by an estimated 0.333 million household viewers and gained a 0.18 ratings share among adults aged 18–49. The episode received critical acclaim, with critics praising the humor, action sequences, shock value and character development.

== Plot ==
Ash (Bruce Campbell) is allowed to stay in his old house's bedroom, even though Brock (Lee Majors) is not delighted. At the local morgue, a possessed corpse kills the coroner.

Threatened with the dagger, Ruby (Lucy Lawless) explains that she hid the Necronomicon inside a corpse from the morgue. Pablo (Ray Santiago) stays with Ruby, while Ash and Kelly (Dana DeLorenzo) go to the morgue to retrieve the book. Ash chops up some of the bodies, eventually discovering the Necronomicon inside a body. However, a Deadite corpse attacks Ash with the guts, eventually getting part of his head inside the body. After struggling with the Deadite, Ash finally kills it. He also discovers that one of the corpses is Lillian Pendergrass, his old high school P.E. teacher. However, when checking the body, he finds an entirely different woman.

Brock is revealed to be dating Lillian (Carmen Duncan), unaware that she is a Deadite. In Ash's room, Pablo asks Ruby about his visions. Ruby states that Pablo's contact with the Necronomicon granted him the ability of premonitions. One of these includes Ruby tying him up and slashing his throat with her fingernail, but Pablo refuses to disclose it. The Deadite Lillian burst into the room, mistaking them for Ash. Ash and Kelly arrive, just in time to see Ruby behead Lillian.

Pablo eventually reveals his premonition to Ruby. She deduces that his premonition involved Baal, her ex-husband, was responsible for the children rebelling. When she asks for the Necronomicon, Ash states he left it in his car. However, they witness as two teenagers, whom Ash insulted previously, steal his car with the Necronomicon inside.

== Production ==
=== Development ===
The episode was written by Cameron Welsh, and directed by Tony Tilse. It was Welsh's first writing credit, and Tilse's third directorial credit.

== Reception ==
=== Viewers ===
In its original American broadcast, "The Morgue" was seen by an estimated 0.333 million household viewers and gained a 0.18 ratings share among adults aged 18–49, according to Nielsen Media Research. This means that 0.18 percent of all households with televisions watched the episode. This was a 24% decrease in viewership from the previous episode, which was watched by 0.436 million viewers with a 0.21 in the 18-49 demographics.

=== Critical reviews ===
"The Morgue" received critical acclaim. Matt Fowler of IGN gave the episode an "amazing" 9 out of 10 rating and wrote in his verdict, "'The Morgue' was pretty much the most insane Ash vs. Evil Dead episode to date, featuring a fight scene (and insertion scene) that needs to be seen to be believed. On top of that, it was also very funny, delivering a shallow stupid Ash that we, and his fellow teammates, could still somehow support and respect."

Michael Roffman of The A.V. Club gave the episode an "A–" grade and wrote, "Welsh kicked things up a notch or five with 'The Morgue,' affording Ash Vs. Evil Dead some time to settle down, relax, and maybe take in the town of Elk Grove with a nice autumnal walk and a balmy cup of pumpkin spice latte. Sh'yeah, right, and Ashley Williams might fly out of my butt."

Stephen Harber of Den of Geek gave the episode a 4 star rating out of 5 and wrote, "Like I said last week: Ash vs. Evil Dead is a superhero show. Just read the goddamn title, why don't you? Sheesh. But let's face it... it's turning into a sitcom. A sitcom about what? Superheroes? American ignorance? Bad taste in general? Yes, baby. Yes to all the above. And we're diggin' it." Steve Ford of TV Fanatic gave the episode a 4.8 star rating out of 5 and wrote, "This was another fantastic episode that just flew by. The scenes at the morgue will not soon be forgotten, and I'm looking forward to what's in store for us next week (as long as there are no achilles tendons involved)."

Merrill Barr of Forbes wrote, "It's good fun, but its primary purpose is to serve as exposition for the season. Now we know what Ruby's children are after: the tools necessary to raise up their father from the underworld. Mainly, what they need is the book. That's it. That's all this episode is about... yet, 'The Morgue' is going to be remembered as one of the best episodes in the show's history." Jasef Wisener of TV Overmind wrote, "I really can't believe that 'The Morgue' went there, but the absolute bonkers nature of the horror and comedy blend in this episode shows that Ash vs. Evil Dead knows where its sweet spot is. It shouldn't do this every episode, but this series may never run out of ideas for ways to surprise us and deliver on all fronts." Blair Marnell of Nerdist wrote, "Somehow, we suspect that 'The Morgue' will always be known as that episode of Ash vs. Evil Dead. The one where the series went full Starz, becoming even wilder than anything in the Evil Dead movies."
