= Bound in Flesh =

- Ash vs Evil Dead episode
- Episode no.: Season 1 Episode 9
- Directed by: Tony Tilse
- Written by: Rob Wright
- Cinematography by: Dave Garbett
- Editing by: Tom Eagles
- Original release date: December 26, 2015
- Running time: 30 minutes

Guest appearances
- Samara Weaving as Heather; Indiana Evans as Melissa; Ido Drent as Brad

Episode chronology
← Previous "Ashes to Ashes"	Next → "The Dark One"

"Bound in Flesh" is the ninth episode of the first season of the American comedy horror television series Ash vs Evil Dead, which serves as a continuation of the Evil Dead trilogy. The episode was written by Rob Wright, and directed by Tony Tilse. It originally aired on the premium channel Starz on December 26, 2015.

The series is set 30 years after the events of the Evil Dead trilogy, and follows Ash Williams, who now works at the "Value Stop" as a simple stock boy. Having spent his life not doing anything remarkable since the events of the trilogy, Ash will have to renounce his routine existence and become a hero once more by taking up arms and facing the titular Evil Dead. In the episode, Ash intends to bury the Necronomicon at the cabin, although the presence of Ruby threatens to ruin his plans.

According to Nielsen Media Research, the episode was seen by an estimated 0.343 million household viewers and gained a 0.14 ratings share among adults aged 18–49. The episode received extremely positive reviews from critics, who praised the action sequences, character development, make-up and ending.

== Plot ==
At the cabin, Pablo (Ray Santiago) and Kelly (Dana DeLorenzo) discover Ash (Bruce Campbell) fighting with another version of himself. As both Ashes claim to be the real Ash, Pablo and Kelly struggle to decide whom to shoot. When one of them suggests that they shoot both of them just to make sure, Pablo and Kelly immediately gun down the other Ash, correctly deducing it was the imposter.

Just as Ash prepares to chop up the corpses of the imposter and Amanda (Jill Marie Jones) to prevent them from possession, the hikers return, wanting to stay at the cabin. Ash refuses to let them enter or stay in the woods, so he has Pablo and Kelly lead them out while he stays behind and chops up the imposter's body. While finishing, Ash is taunted by the Necronomicon, telling him that he shouldn't bury him as he is everything he needs. Ash locks the book in the fridge and prepares to chop up Amanda's corpse, only to discover that her body is gone.

In the woods, Melissa (Indiana Evans) is killed by a possessed Amanda, who then kills Brad (Ido Drent). She then pursues a terrified Heather (Samara Weaving), managing to break her leg when she throws her to a tree. Pablo tries to save her, but is choked by the Deadite. However, Ruby (Lucy Lawless) appears and attacks Amanda, but Heather's scream distracts her and allows Amanda to escape. As Ruby chops up Melissa and Brad, she explains that she has followed Ash, cleaning up all the mess he has made with the Necronomicon, claiming that he is responsible for all the deaths as long as he has the book.

At the cabin, Ash is approached by Ruby, Pablo, Kelly and Heather. Ruby demands the Necronomicon, despite Ash's claim that he needs to bury it to end everything. She explains that the book cannot be buried as others will eventually discover it, claiming that it must be dismantled using her dagger. Ash accepts to Ruby's idea and follows her instructions, which includes cutting the book's face off. She then officially hands over the book to Ruby, who starts a ritual. The cabin starts trembling, and the book's face suddenly attaches itself to Pablo's face, attracted to his medallion. Ash tries to stop the ritual, only to be thrown around the house by Ruby. Ruby then reveals herself as the author of the Necronomicon, shocking Ash.

== Production ==
=== Development ===
The episode was written by Rob Wright, and directed by Tony Tilse. It was Wright's first writing credit, and Tilse's second directorial credit.

== Reception ==
=== Viewers ===
In its original American broadcast, "Bound in Flesh" was seen by an estimated 0.343 million household viewers and gained a 0.14 ratings share among adults aged 18–49, according to Nielsen Media Research. This means that 0.14 percent of all households with televisions watched the episode. This was a 27% decrease in viewership from the previous episode, which was watched by 0.465 million viewers with a 0.18 in the 18-49 demographics.

=== Critical reviews ===
"Bound in Flesh" received extremely positive reviews from critics. Matt Fowler of IGN gave the episode a "great" 8.8 out of 10 rating and wrote in his verdict, "There've been other episodes that have made an earnest, determined run at Ash. That have tried their best to give us the funny, endlessly quotable, idiot hero from Army of Darkness. But 'Bound in Flesh' nailed it. And it was also the perfect balance of Ash too, given his journey on the show. A guy who can care about his team and still be a giant jackass. This one just cooked."

Michael Roffman of The A.V. Club gave the episode a "B" grade and wrote, "Needless to say, 'Bound In The Flesh' packs a number of punches and most of them are manic, overwhelming, and uncompromising. It's telling how veteran TV producer and writer Rob Wright blasts his way through last week's Two Ashes plot device. Instead, he has way too many threads to contend with, from helpless campers to dismemberment by Bill Withers to Fisher's ugly possession to Ruby's strange return, which explains his economical, touch-and-go approach to the episode. It's an admirable decision and he does a serviceable job shuffling things around to the best of his abilities, but he still can't shake the pacing issues that huff and puff and leave us reaching for the inhaler. Which says a lot given the traditionally swift nature of this series and the franchise as a whole."

Gina McIntyre of Entertainment Weekly wrote, "As Amanda makes a not-so-surprising return, Ruby comes through with the night's biggest twist." Stephen Harber of Den of Geek gave the episode a 4 star rating out of 5 and wrote, "'Bound in the Flesh' was one of the most satisfying and confident episodes of Ash vs Evil Dead so far. Now that it's back in familiar territory (i.e. the cabin), it feels ready to tell a story that is equally as relevant to the future of Evil Dead as much as it is respectful to the past."

Carissa Pavlica of TV Fanatic gave the episode a 4.7 star rating out of 5 and wrote, "'Bound in the Flesh' had a bit of everything: lots of gore, quite a bit of humor (Lucy Lawless and Bruce Campbell play off each other beautifully) and that surprise ending reminiscent of a gooey version of The Mask." Jasef Wisener of TV Overmind wrote, "At every single twist and turn, I've been blown away at how well-constructed this series is, and I hope that it manages to continue for years to come." Blair Marnell of Nerdist wrote, "This was a particularly exhilarating episode of Ash vs. Evil Dead that was well executed on every level. It remains to be seen if next week's season finale will tie everything up neatly or if there's a cliffhanger ending that will send the story into season two. Either way, we're up for it!"
