= Last Call (Ash vs Evil Dead) =

- Ash vs Evil Dead episode
- Episode no.: Season 2 Episode 3
- Directed by: Tony Tilse
- Written by: Noelle Valdivia
- Cinematography by: Dave Garbett
- Editing by: Allanah Bazzard
- Original release date: October 16, 2016
- Running time: 29 minutes

Guest appearance
- Lee Majors as Brock Williams

Episode chronology
← Previous "The Morgue"	Next → "DUI"

"Last Call" is the third episode of the second season of the American comedy horror television series Ash vs Evil Dead, which serves as a continuation of the Evil Dead trilogy. It is the thirteenth overall episode of the series and was written by co-producer Noelle Valdivia, and directed by Tony Tilse. It originally aired on the premium channel Starz on October 16, 2016.

The series is set 30 years after the events of the Evil Dead trilogy, and follows Ash Williams, who now works at the "Value Stop" as a simple stock boy. Having spent his life not doing anything remarkable since the events of the trilogy, Ash will have to renounce his routine existence and become a hero once more by taking up arms and facing the titular Evil Dead. In the episode, Ash decides to throw a party to lure the teenagers who stole his car.

According to Nielsen Media Research, the episode was seen by an estimated 0.321 million household viewers and gained a 0.19 ratings share among adults aged 18–49. The episode received extremely positive reviews from critics, who praised the episode's humor, character development and emotional weight.

== Plot ==
Ash (Bruce Campbell) feels depressed after losing its car. Somewhere, the teenagers take girls to the stolen car, with a couple making out. The girl is possessed by a Deadite and attacks one of the teenagers after eating his penis during oral sex. The Delta suddenly is possessed after one of the teenagers reads from the Necronomicon and starts to kill them.

Desperate to retrieve it, Ash reunites with his old friend, Chet (Ted Raimi), with both deciding to throw a party at the bar to lure the teenagers, intending to use a drug called "Pink fuck". The party attracts the crowd, but not the teenagers, which disappoints Ash. Brock (Lee Majors) also shows up as the bar is his frequent location every Saturday. After an argument with Ash, Brock proceeds to humiliate him by proving he can still party and break Ash's time at a rodeo bull. Disappointed by Ash's actions, Ruby (Lucy Lawless) leaves and convinces Kelly (Dana DeLorenzo) to accompany her.

Pablo (Ray Santiago) notices that one of the partygoers, Amber (Olivia Mahood), is the possessed Deadite from the Delta, who is also trying to hook up with Brock. He convinces a reluctant Ash to save Brock. Ash attacks the possessed Amber in front of Brock, beheading her. This causes Brock to smile at his son for the first time in years. The partygoers escape the bar when Ash is seen with her head. Brock reaffirms to Ash that he sees him as a hero and admits to his mistake, also explaining he kept something from him. Before he reveals it, the Delta runs over him. As the Delta drives off, Ash laments the loss of his father.

== Production ==
=== Development ===
The episode was written by co-producer Noelle Valdivia, and directed by Tony Tilse. It was Valdivia's first writing credit, and Tilse's fourth directorial credit.

== Reception ==
=== Viewers ===
In its original American broadcast, "Last Call" was seen by an estimated 0.321 million household viewers and gained a 0.19 ratings share among adults aged 18–49, according to Nielsen Media Research. This means that 0.19 percent of all households with televisions watched the episode. This was a slight decrease in viewership from the previous episode, which was watched by 0.333 million viewers with a 0.18 in the 18-49 demographics.

=== Critical reviews ===
"Last Call" received extremely positive reviews from critics. Matt Fowler of IGN gave the episode a "great" 8.8 out of 10 rating and wrote in his verdict, "'Last Call' was funny, full of feelings, and rather unforgiving. Ash's Oldsmobile turned into a rampaging animal, sadistically slaughtering a gaggle of teens - and then finally Ash's own dad. Plus, the party setting was the perfect way to make the show feel a bit more populated while allowing out main characters to reflect on their lives."

Michael Roffman of The A.V. Club gave the episode a "B" grade and wrote, "So, yeah, it's a tad disheartening to see Ash Vs. Evil Dead stoop to such a lame gag, especially given the franchise's more unorthodox track record, but I'll be damned if I didn't laugh a little."

Stephen Harber of Den of Geek wrote, "What's so fascinating about Last Call, and what makes it a stand-out entry, is that it hits all the notes that an episode of Ash Vs Evil Dead should hit. It's gross, it's hilarious, it's gory, it's ironic. It's disgustingly, dementedly disturbing. And hot damn is it relentless!" Steve Ford of TV Fanatic gave the episode a 4 star rating out of 5 and wrote, "This was another solid episode of Ash vs Evil Dead, and although we lost an outstanding character, it will for sure be the driving force for Ash going forward."

Merrill Barr of Forbes wrote, "Last week, there was a question of how Ash vs Evil Dead was going to top the monumental moment of Ash having his head shoved up the rectum of a dead corpse. Logically, there was no way to go for a gross-out that tops that concept, which meant the only move was to dive deeper into the series' emotion. Thankfully, that's exactly what happened." Blair Marnell of Nerdist wrote, "This was a great episode, with strong writing and performances. We've loved this show since the beginning, and it's exciting to see it getting better week by week."
