= Confinement (Ash vs Evil Dead) =

- Ash vs Evil Dead episode
- Episode no.: Season 2 Episode 5
- Directed by: Michael J. Bassett
- Written by: William Bromell
- Cinematography by: Kevin Riley
- Editing by: Bryan Shaw
- Original release date: October 30, 2016
- Running time: 27 minutes

Guest appearances
- Joel Tobeck as Baal; Stephen Lovatt as Sheriff Thomas Emery

Episode chronology
| ← Previous "DUI" | Next → "Trapped Inside" |

"Confinement" is the fifth episode of the second season of the American comedy horror television series Ash vs Evil Dead, which serves as a continuation of the Evil Dead trilogy. It is the fifteenth overall episode of the series and was written by William Bromell, and directed by co-executive producer Michael J. Bassett. It originally aired on the premium channel Starz on October 30, 2016.

The series is set 30 years after the events of the Evil Dead trilogy, and follows Ash Williams, who now works at the "Value Stop" as a simple stock boy. Having spent his life not doing anything remarkable since the events of the trilogy, Ash will have to renounce his routine existence and become a hero once more by taking up arms and facing the titular Evil Dead. In the episode, Ash and his group are trapped inside a police station, where Baal plans to turn them against each other.

According to Nielsen Media Research, the episode was seen by an estimated 274,000 household viewers and gained a 0.13 ratings share among adults aged 18–49. The episode received mixed-to-positive reviews from critics, who praised the action sequences and make-up but criticized the pacing and under-developed characters.

== Plot ==
A police officer arrives at the bar, which was partly destroyed. Hearing a voice calling her, she finds Amber's body in the restroom. As she calls authorities, a demon (Joel Tobeck) appears and possesses her to undress. He uses his large fingernails to rip apart the officer's skin and donning it, revealing itself to be Baal.

While walking on the street, Ash (Bruce Campbell) is arrested for Amber's murder and placed on a cell with Chet (Ted Raimi). Using the human disguise, Baal releases Ash from his cell. As he leaves, Pablo (Ray Santiago), Kelly (Dana DeLorenzo) and Ruby (Lucy Lawless) have arrived at the station, just as Lacey (Pepi Sonuga) reunites with Sheriff Emery (Stephen Lovatt) and Linda (Michelle Hurd). Ash discovers the officer's skin just as the lights go out, locking them inside the station.

Sheriff Emery suspects Ash was involved in the officer's death, until Ruby reaffirms that Baal is responsible, and his ability could mean anyone could be possessed. She tests her theory by shooting Emery in the leg, concluding he is not possessed. While retrieving her dagger from the evidence room, Ruby gets locked with another officer. Back at the station, Pablo reveals that he contracted a strange rash in his chest, worrying him that he might be possessed. Emery then starts to suspect Ash himself might be Baal, citing Ash's murder of Amber, which he does not deny.

At the evidence room, Ruby discovers that the officer is actually Baal. After ripping his human body, Ruby tries to kill him with the dagger but Baal easily fends her off. He knocks her unconscious and leaves the room. Back at the office, Emery is ready to shoot Pablo given his worsening condition. Manipulated by Baal, Emery threatens his wife to shoot her before returning to normal. Ash attacks him, but a reanimated flesh enters the office to attack the group. Using his chainsaw, Ash destroys the flesh. Emery tries to apologize to Linda for her actions but she rejects him, siding with Ash. Pablo's rash worsens, making his skin carve out passages from the Necronomicon. Pablo laments that he is Baal, but Ruby reaffirms that he is not Baal, he is actually their weapon against him.

== Production ==
=== Development ===
The episode was written by William Bromell, and directed by co-executive producer Michael J. Bassett. It was Bromell's first writing credit, and Bassett's fifth directorial credit.

== Reception ==
=== Viewers ===
In its original American broadcast, "Confinement" was seen by an estimated 0.274 million household viewers and gained a 0.13 ratings share among adults aged 18–49, according to Nielsen Media Research. This means that 0.13 percent of all households with televisions watched the episode. This was steady in viewership from the previous episode, which was watched by 0.274 million viewers with a 0.13 in the 18-49 demographics.

=== Critical reviews ===
"Confinement" received mixed-to-positive reviews from critics. Matt Fowler of IGN gave the episode a "good" 7.8 out of 10 rating and wrote in his verdict, "Greasy-haired, disheveled Baal just didn't have the big boss presence I was looking for in an Evil Dead overlord, as there haven't been too many of them over the course of the franchise. I did like that 'Confinement' trapped all the Season 2 players together for a story that got everyone on the same page while also expanding on the mystery of Pablo and the Necronomicon."

Michael Roffman of The A.V. Club gave the episode a "C+" grade and wrote, "This is the type of applause-worthy ingenuity that allows this series to move away from the traditional hack 'em and slash 'em horror and into something cerebrally terrifying. But it's all about execution and knowing precisely when to let the pot boil over naturally; 'Confinement' could have been far more effective if it didn't irrationally move at 88 mph and overindulge in shock 'em and rock 'em tension. In other words, we're never given time to question Baal's next move, making this feel more like a rushed game of Checkers than a meditative half hour of Chess."

Stephen Harber of Den of Geek wrote, "What else can I say about Confinement that’s not completely focused on Baal? We had some great scenes and one-liners here from just about every main cast member, and despite mentioning how much I enjoyed seeing them all split up last week, there's a lot of fun to be had when they're all stuck in a room with each other." Steve Ford of TV Fanatic gave the episode a perfect 5 star rating out of 5 and wrote, "This episode was the best installment of the season. Baal was charming, yet mischievous and dark. The stakes are only bound be raised as we gear up for the second half of Ash vs Evil Dead Season 2."

Merrill Barr of Forbes wrote, "What this week's episode also had going for it was creativity in spacial awareness. Shows like Ash also thrive on an ability to confine the space of characters as much as possible. Placing everyone in a police station they can't leave is the perfect way to deliver some scares. Like a horror-centric Assault on Precinct 13. But, where the episode gets really crazy is when it brings yet another cleverly conceived monster to the forefront." Jasef Wisener of TV Overmind wrote, "'Confinement' is, once again, an incredibly strong episode of Ash vs. Evil Dead, and it's really cool to see a series with a sophomore season that is this much better than an already near-perfect first season."
