= Home (Ash vs Evil Dead) =

- Ash vs Evil Dead episode
- Episode no.: Season 2 Episode 1
- Directed by: Rick Jacobson
- Written by: Craig DeGregorio
- Cinematography by: Dave Garbett
- Editing by: Tom Eagles
- Original release date: October 2, 2016
- Running time: 33 minutes

Guest appearances
- Lee Majors as Brock Williams; Stephen Lovatt as Sheriff Thomas Emery

Episode chronology
← Previous "The Dark One"	Next → "The Morgue"

"Home" is the first episode of the second season of the American comedy horror television series Ash vs Evil Dead, which serves as a continuation of the Evil Dead trilogy. It is the eleventh overall episode of the series and was written by executive producer Craig DiGregorio, and directed by co-executive producer Rick Jacobson. It originally aired on the premium channel Starz on October 2, 2016, although the episode was available early on September 27, 2016 through Facebook and Starz.com.

The series is set 30 years after the events of the Evil Dead trilogy, and follows Ash Williams, who now works at the "Value Stop" as a simple stock boy. Having spent his life not doing anything remarkable since the events of the trilogy, Ash will have to renounce his routine existence and become a hero once more by taking up arms and facing the titular Evil Dead. In the episode, Ash is forced to go out of retirement when Ruby's children start causing chaos.

According to Nielsen Media Research, the episode was seen by an estimated 0.436 million household viewers and gained a 0.21 ratings share among adults aged 18–49. The episode received extremely positive reviews from critics, who praised the performances, humor, character development and new storylines.

== Plot ==
At an unknown location, Ruby (Lucy Lawless) is attacked by her Deadite children, who want the Necronomicon. After fighting some of them, she casts a spell.

In Jacksonville, Ash (Bruce Campbell) is enjoying retirement, partying with other residents, while Pablo (Ray Santiago) and Kelly (Dana DeLorenzo) work at the bar. Suddenly, two Deadites attack them, with one of them referring to Ash as "Ashy Slashy", claiming Ruby sent them. After killing them, Ash decides to go after Ruby, deducing that she is in his hometown Elk Grove, Michigan, due to the "Ashy Slashy" namedrop.

At his old house, Ash introduces them to his father, Brock (Lee Majors). Brock is not fond of Ash's return, given that he ran away from town after the events at the cabin, as Ash failed to convince everyone of his claims. At a local bar, no one is delighted to see Ash returning, except for a waitress named Linda Bates (Michelle Hurd). Linda's husband, town sheriff Thomas Emery (Stephen Lovatt), mocks Ash, intending to arrest him as soon as possible when given the chance. During this, Pablo starts experiencing visions, eventually concluding that Ruby must be in the town's crematorium.

At the crematorium, Kelly almost drowns when she is pulled into the water by a Deadite, until Pablo saves her. Ash eventually finds Ruby, who wants his help in fighting her children, who have turned against her. Three children kidnap Ruby and prepare to kill her, until Ash intervenes. Ash fails to fend them off, forcing Ruby to stab one of them with her dagger, forcing the others to escape while Ash kills the child. As Pablo and Kelly arrive, Ruby asks for their help in finding the hidden Necronomicon and banishing them back to hell. Despite her previous actions, Ash agrees to help.

== Production ==
=== Development ===
The episode was written by executive producer Craig DiGregorio, and directed by co-executive producer Rick Jacobson. It was DiGregorio's second writing credit, and Jacobson's second directorial credit.

== Reception ==
=== Viewers ===
In its original American broadcast, "Home" was seen by an estimated 0.436 million household viewers and gained a 0.21 ratings share among adults aged 18–49, according to Nielsen Media Research. This means that 0.21 percent of all households with televisions watched the episode. This was a 15% decrease in viewership from the previous episode, which was watched by 0.508 million viewers with a 0.21 in the 18-49 demographics.

=== Critical reviews ===
"Home" received extremely positive reviews from critics. Matt Fowler of IGN gave the episode a "great" 8.6 out of 10 rating and wrote in his verdict, "'Home' delivered the goods, bombarding us with blood and backstory while keeping Ash tragically shallow and smarmy. Plus, it managed to rescue Ruby from her Season 1 character wasteland and bring her more fully into the story in a way that seems the best fit for her."

Michael Roffman of The A.V. Club gave the episode an "A–" grade and wrote, "It's gross, it's ridiculous, it's even stupid, but it's cleverly self-aware about all of this. From the editing down to the line delivery, Ash Vs. Evil Dead is always in on the joke, and that's why it's able to saw its way into the next story without looking too far ahead."

Stephen Harber of Den of Geek gave the episode a 3 star rating out of 5 and wrote, "So. Outside of introducing Lee Majors, what purpose does this trip 'Home' serve? Is it part of a more cohesive master plan for the season this time? Is it sowing the seeds for a larger conflict with this year's 'big bad', should such a thing rear its ugly head? Or is this journey back to Ash's past meant to foreshadow any time-traveling shenanigans Ruby may conjure up later? The hell if I know. Like I said, it's hard to set your expectations with this series. But I think I like that." Steve Ford of TV Fanatic gave the episode a perfect 5 star rating out of 5 and wrote, "The wait is finally over and our favorite chainsaw wielding, one liner spewing, self-centered, egotistical demon slayer has returned."

Jasef Wisener of TV Overmind wrote, "Overall, 'Home' was an extremely strong episode of an extremely strong series, and it does everything that a season premiere should do by reintroducing a storyline while wrapping you into a new plot." Blair Marnell of Nerdist wrote, "That was a very strong way to start the season, and this show seems to be firmly in control of its characters and tone. It was funny, gory, and action packed. What's not to love?"
