= Indiana Evans =

Australian actress (born 1990)

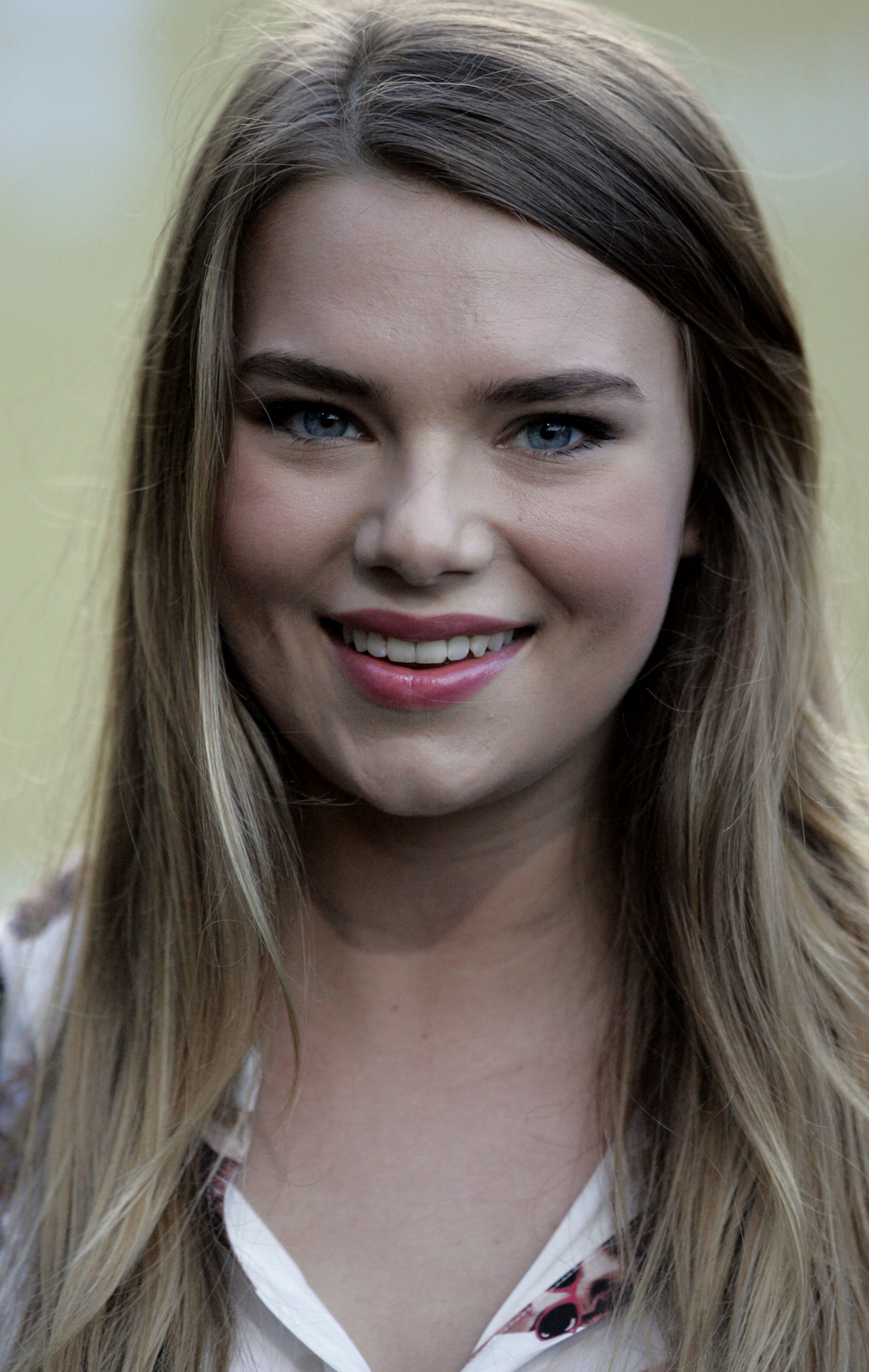
- Evans in 2013
- Born: Indiana Rose Evans; 27 July 1990 (age 36); Sydney, New South Wales, Australia
- Occupations: Actress, singer, songwriter
- Years active: 2003–present
- Known for: Home and Away; H_{2}O: Just Add Water; Blue Lagoon: The Awakening

Indiana Rose Evans (born 27 July 1990) is an Australian actress. She is best known for her roles in Home and Away as Matilda Hunter, H_{2}O: Just Add Water as Bella Hartley, and Blue Lagoon: The Awakening as Emmaline Robinson.

== Early life ==
Evans had an interest in performing since the age of five, when she would perform for family and friends. At the age of seven, Evans' parents enrolled her into dance lessons, which started with ballet and then evolved to jazz and tap.

Before working on Home and Away, Evans started high school at Newtown High School of the Performing Arts, but left after two weeks to focus on her acting career. She then took up a correspondence course until she turned 15.

== Career ==
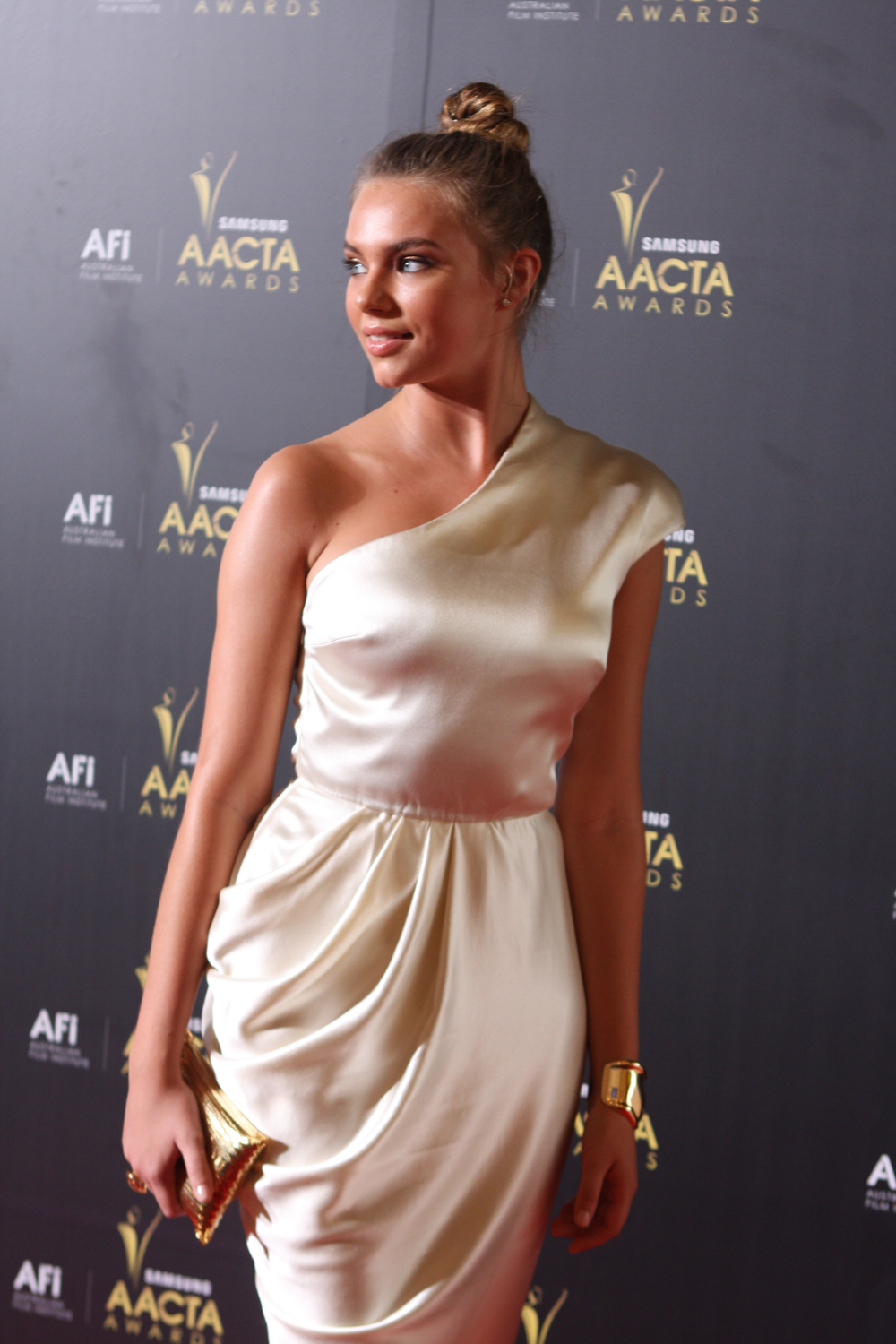
Indiana Evans at the AACTA Awards 2012

Evans made her acting debut in the 2003 Australian medical drama All Saints. She then landed the main role in an American campaign for Kool-Aid. That same year, Evans had a recurring role on the Nine Network children's series Snobs, which centres on two unlikely friends from two different worlds. The series lasted only one season. Evans has since appeared in other shows such as Comedy Inc., Cops L.A.C., and The Strip.

Following Snobs, Evans joined the cast of the long-running Seven Network soap opera Home and Away. She portrayed Matilda Hunter, a privileged teenage girl who is forced to move to the Summer Bay Caravan Park. Evans was nominated for a Logie Award and an Inside Soap Award for the role. In April 2008, Evans revealed she had been offered a contract extension but passed on the offer and instead would be leaving the series. Evans made her final appearance in July 2008.

In 2009, Evans starred in the Network Ten television film A Model Daughter: The Killing of Caroline Byrne. That same year, Evans replaced Claire Holt as one of the three leads on the Network Ten Children television series H_{2}O: Just Add Water. She played the role of Isabella "Bella" Hartley, an aspiring singer and mermaid since the age of nine. Evans performed the theme song, "No Ordinary Girl", as well as a number of additional tracks that were featured over the course of the season. She completed a solo soundtrack album for the series, titled H_{2}O: Just Add Water, which was released in March 2011. The series was not renewed for a fourth season.

In August 2010, Evans made her feature-film debut in the Australian disaster film Arctic Blast, playing the character Naomi Tate. The film follows a solar eclipse that threatens to engulf the world in ice and begin a new ice age. The film was shot in Tasmania on a budget of A$5 million. It received mixed reviews from critics.

In November 2010, Evans was cast as a regular in the ABC1 Legal Drama television series Crownies, which centres around a group of solicitors fresh from law school working for the Office of the Director of Public Prosecution. Evans played Tatum Novak, the daughter of a notorious gangster. The series was filmed in Sydney, New South Wales, and premiered on 14 July 2011; it ran for one season and was not renewed.

In February 2012, Evans signed on to play the female lead role in the 2012 Lifetime television film Blue Lagoon: The Awakening, alongside fellow Australian actor Brenton Thwaites, who also appeared on Home and Away.

In February 2014, Evans joined the cast of the U.S. television drama Secrets and Lies. The series aired on ABC and is based on the Australian series of the same name, which first aired in March 2014.

== Filmography ==
=== Film ===
Year	Title	Role	Notes
2008	Burden	Lara Boyd-Cutler	Short film
2010	Arctic Blast	Naomi Tate	Feature film
2022	Thor: Love and Thunder	Zeusette	Feature film

=== Television ===
Year	Title	Role	Notes
2003	All Saints	Milly Roberts	Episode: "Destiny's Child"
2003–2004	Snobs	Abby Oakley	Main role
2004–2008	Home and Away	Matilda Hunter	Main role
2008	The Strip	China Williams	Episode: "Schoolies"
2009	A Model Daughter: The Killing of Caroline Byrne	Kylie Watson	TV film
2009–2010	H2O: Just Add Water	Isabella “Bella” Hartley	Main role (season 3); 26 episodes
2010	Cops L.A.C.	Kylie Tremaine	Episode: "Lost Girls"
2011	Crownies	Tatum Novak	Main role
2012	Blue Lagoon: The Awakening	Emmaline Robinson	TV film
2014	Janet King	Tatum Novak	Season 1, 4 episodes
2015	Secrets and Lies	Natalie Crawford	Main role (season 1)
2015	House Husbands	Tash	Episodes 4.1, 4.2
2015	Ash vs Evil Dead	Melissa	Episodes: "Ashes to Ashes", "Bound in Flesh"
2024	A Remarkable Place to Die	Maja Staunton	

== Soundtrack ==
Evans sings most of the songs on the 2011 soundtrack for H_{2}O: Just Add Water.

== Awards and nominations ==
Year	Award	Category	Work	Result	Refs
2005	Logie Awards	Most Popular New Talent – Female	Home and Away	Nominated	
2005	Nickelodeon Kids' Choice Awards	Rising Star	Home and Away	Nominated	
2007	Inside Soap Awards	Best Young Actor	Home and Away	Nominated	
2008	Inside Soap Awards	Sexiest Female	Home and Away	Nominated	
2008	Dolly Teen Choice Awards	Queen of Teen	Home and Away	Won	
