= The Dark One (Ash vs Evil Dead) =

- Ash vs Evil Dead episode
- Episode no.: Season 1 Episode 10
- Directed by: Rick Jacobson
- Written by: Craig DeGregorio
- Cinematography by: John Cavill
- Editing by: Bryan Shaw
- Original release date: January 2, 2016
- Running time: 37 minutes

Guest appearances
- Samara Weaving as Heather; Marissa Stott as Tattoo Girl

Episode chronology
← Previous "Bound in Flesh"	Next → "Home"

"The Dark One" is the tenth episode and first season finale of the American comedy horror television series Ash vs Evil Dead, which serves as a continuation of the Evil Dead trilogy. The episode was written by executive producer Craig DiGregorio, and directed by producer Rick Jacobson. It originally aired on the premium channel Starz on January 2, 2016.

The series is set 30 years after the events of the Evil Dead trilogy, and follows Ash Williams, who now works at the "Value Stop" as a simple stock boy. Having spent his life not doing anything remarkable since the events of the trilogy, Ash will have to renounce his routine existence and become a hero once more by taking up arms and facing the titular Evil Dead. In the episode, Ash takes a final stand against Ruby, before she unleashes all evil on the world.

According to Nielsen Media Research, the episode was seen by an estimated 0.508 million household viewers and gained a 0.21 ratings share among adults aged 18–49, making it the most watched episode of the series. The episode received critical acclaim, with critics praising the performances, directing, character development, action sequences, make-up and set-up for the next season.

== Plot ==
As Kelly (Dana DeLorenzo) tries to take the mask off Pablo (Ray Santiago), Ash (Bruce Campbell) confronts Ruby (Lucy Lawless). The Deadite Amanda (Jill Marie Jones) appears, attacking Ash with his own chainsaw. After a struggle, he manages to kill the Deadite, but realizes that Ruby and the possessed Pablo have disappeared into the cellar.

Ash prepares to enter the cellar with Kelly and Heather (Samara Weaving). However, the Kandarian force pounds the cabin, causing Ash to fall into the cellar, which locks by itself. He finds himself back at his home trailer where he opened the Necronomicon while smoking marijuana, eventually finding Ruby. Ruby offers him his dream of making it to Jacksonville as a retirement plan as long as he does not interfere with her plans to conquer the world. Ash tries to shoot her but she sends him back to the reality. Back in the cabin, Kelly attempts to open the cellar with an axe, while Heather suffers hallucinations of bugs invading her body. The force then ejects Kelly out of the cabin, leaving Heather alone in the living room.

At the cellar, Ash watches as Ruby forces a possessed Pablo to cough up a fetus, which quickly transforms into a child. The child attacks Ash, who manages to kill him with his shotgun. He confronts Ruby, mortally wounding her with the shotgun. Before he can killer her, a possessed Pablo attacks Ash. Outside, Kelly hears as a terrified Heather is haunted by the cabin, physically torturing her before eventually killing her. Kelly decides to cover the cabin with gas, before engulfing it in flames. The doors eventually open, allowing Kelly to enter the cellar.

Ash's chainsaw runs out of gas, prompting the possessed Pablo to try to kill him with his own shotgun. Kelly arrives and fights Pablo, while Ruby chokes Ash. With a distraction, Ash seizes her dagger, which power is strong enough to kill her. He wants her to release Pablo from the mask's power, which she refuses to do. She once again offers her the Jacksonville offer, also willing to release Pablo if he stops interfering. Ash accepts the deal, and Pablo is now free from the mask's power, although Ash will keep her dagger.

Ash happily drives his car to Jacksonville, although Pablo and Kelly are scared about the implications of his deal with Ruby. The radio suddenly announces that massive sinkholes have started appearing over the city. Ash turns it off, before deciding to go out for dinner. The episode ends as a sinkhole appears behind the car.

== Production ==
=== Development ===
The episode was written by executive producer Craig DiGregorio, and directed by producer Rick Jacobson. It was DiGregorio's first writing credit, and Jacobson's first directorial credit.

== Reception ==
=== Viewers ===
In its original American broadcast, "The Dark One" was seen by an estimated 0.508 million household viewers and gained a 0.21 ratings share among adults aged 18–49, according to Nielsen Media Research. This means that 0.21 percent of all households with televisions watched the episode. This was a 48% increase in viewership from the previous episode, which was watched by 0.343 million viewers with a 0.14 in the 18-49 demographics.

=== Critical reviews ===
"The Dark One" received critical acclaim. Matt Fowler of IGN gave the episode an "amazing" 9 out of 10 rating and wrote in his verdict, "'The Dark One' delivered the Lucy Lawless/Bruce Campbell showdown we were waiting for while also giving us a great grab-bag of gore and guffaws. A very strong, violent, funny finish for the first season of the show. For the third episode in a row to take place in the cabin it really felt vital and exciting."

Michael Roffman of The A.V. Club gave the episode an "A" grade and wrote, "Show runner Craig DiGregorio penned 'The Dark One' and it's further evidence that the veteran producer and writer knows what he's doing with Ash Vs. Evil Dead. In just under 34 minutes, he collates the series' respective threads in a succinct and efficient manner, tagging back on a few nostalgic beats while also exorcising some of the most terrifying moments since Sam Raimi's 1981 original. From beginning to end, the episode thrives from an intimidating blend of horror, action, and comedy that's relentless and frantic for its midnight mayhem."

Gina McIntyre of Entertainment Weekly wrote, "Talk about saving the best for last — the final episode of the first season of Ash Vs. Evil Dead really brought out the Evil Dead, with set piece after frenetic set piece adding up to almost non-stop cabin carnage." Stephen Harber of Den of Geek gave the episode a perfect 5 star rating out of 5 and wrote, "'The Dark One' is not only the scariest episode, it's also my favorite so far. This is the kind of show I had pictured when I first heard that the series was greenlit: edgy, ominous and hysterical."

Carissa Pavlica of TV Fanatic gave the episode a 4.5 star rating out of 5 and wrote, "Ash is such an oblivious bastard it's hard to feel sorry for him, after all, by the end of 'The Dark One' he thinks he's about to achieve his life's goal of living in Jacksonville, he's rockin' out to AC/DC, and he has two new besties along for the ride. What's not to love?" Jasef Wisener of TV Overmind wrote, "'The Dark One' managed to cap off a fantastic season of one of the best comedies of the year, and it did so in style and with one of its best episodes to date." Blair Marnell of Nerdist wrote, "If these ten episodes were the only installments of Ash vs. Evil Dead then this ending wouldn't have worked. But the promise of more adventures of Ash and Team Ghost Beaters made up for the lack of resolution in this episode. I can't wait to see where Ash vs. Evil Dead goes from here."
