= DUI (Ash vs Evil Dead) =

- Ash vs Evil Dead episode
- Episode no.: Season 2 Episode 4
- Directed by: Michael J. Bassett
- Written by: Ivan Raimi
- Cinematography by: Kevin Riley
- Editing by: Bryan Shaw
- Original release date: October 23, 2016
- Running time: 27 minutes

Guest appearance
- Joel Tobeck as Baal

Episode chronology
← Previous "Last Call"	Next → "Confinement"

"DUI" is the fourth episode of the second season of the American comedy horror television series Ash vs Evil Dead, which serves as a continuation of the Evil Dead trilogy. It is the fourteenth overall episode of the series and was written by co-creator Ivan Raimi, and directed by co-executive producer Michael J. Bassett. It originally aired on the premium channel Starz on October 23, 2016.

The series is set 30 years after the events of the Evil Dead trilogy, and follows Ash Williams, who now works at the "Value Stop" as a simple stock boy. Having spent his life not doing anything remarkable since the events of the trilogy, Ash will have to renounce his routine existence and become a hero once more by taking up arms and facing the titular Evil Dead. In the episode, Ash pursues his possessed Delta car, which is keeping Pablo and Lacey hostage.

According to Nielsen Media Research, the episode was seen by an estimated 0.274 million household viewers and gained a 0.13 ratings share among adults aged 18–49. The episode received extremely positive reviews from critics, who praised the action sequences, pacing, performances and ending.

== Plot ==
After his father's death, Ash (Bruce Campbell) is confronted by the Delta. Pablo (Ray Santiago) decides to confront the teenagers, only discovering that the car is possessed. The Delta grabs Pablo with the seatbelts and locks him inside with the teenager, Lacey (Pepi Sonuga) before driving off.

Ash convinces Chet (Ted Raimi) to lend him his car to pursue the Delta, with Chet accompanying him under the idea that they were going to a bar. Chet is confused with Ash's chainsaw and shotgun and demands answers. When Ash explains his real pursuit, Chet joins him in his quest, dropping him off at an abandoned demolition derby. Meanwhile, Ruby (Lucy Lawless) and Kelly (Dana DeLorenzo) arrive at Ash's home trailer for weapons. Ruby explains that she needs to stop her children as Baal can manipulate people, which he has done before with her. She also explains that if she cannot stop him in time, he will never be stopped.

At the derby, Ash is attacked by the Delta, who still keeps Pablo and Lacey inside. Using his chainsaw, Ash damages the car, which prompts it to release Lacey and Pablo, although the Necronomicon attacks Pablo. The Delta then aggressively attacks Ash, managing to pull it over the hood of the car. Pablo stabs the Necronomicon with a glass, but the book tells Pablo that he can let him live and stop the possessions if he is allowed to return to his dimension through a passage. Pablo reads it, causing the Delta to go back to normal. Ash and Pablo notice that the trunk of the car is now a portal to hell. They throw the Necronomicon into the portal.

Ruby and Kelly arrive at the crematorium, where they are attacked by Ruby's children. Ruby kills all of the children using her dagger. However, Ruby feels that the Necronomicon is gone and leaves with Kelly. Ash and Pablo leave the derby, with Ash intending to fix the Delta. After they leave, a demon jumps out of the trunk.

== Production ==
=== Development ===
The episode was written by co-creator Ivan Raimi, and directed by co-executive producer Michael J. Bassett. It was Raimi's third writing credit, and Bassett's fourth directorial credit.

== Reception ==
=== Viewers ===
In its original American broadcast, "DUI" was seen by an estimated 0.274 million household viewers and gained a 0.13 ratings share among adults aged 18–49, according to Nielsen Media Research. This means that 0.13 percent of all households with televisions watched the episode. This was a 15% decrease in viewership from the previous episode, which was watched by 0.321 million viewers with a 0.19 in the 18-49 demographics.

=== Critical reviews ===
"DUI" received extremely positive reviews from critics. Matt Fowler of IGN gave the episode a "great" 8.5 out of 10 rating and wrote in his verdict, "'DUI' fittingly felt like the climax for the fist part of the season. It's not quite the halfway point, but a lot of story got cleared away to make room for Baal - who we only caught a small fiery glimpse of right at the end. It was funny, violent, and featured Ash battling his own demonic Delta. What more could you want?"

Michael Roffman of The A.V. Club gave the episode a "B–" grade and wrote, "The problem, though, is that Raimi saws off a little more than he can blast away. 'DUI' is a little messy, despite its simple setup: Ash and Chet go after Pablo and Lacey in the Delta, while Kelly helps Ruby hunt down her demon children. After an episode that stressed the idea of grabbing the bull by the horns — both literally and metaphorically — every character does just that, and it's a very smart move. What's not so smart are the little things that Raimi peppers throughout the episode."

Stephen Harber of Den of Geek gave the episode a 3 star rating out of 5 and wrote, "If the previous episode was a riveting horror indie throwback to Christine, this was its forgettable follow-up sequel that gave away too much in the exposition. This is not to say the episode wasn't satisfying or that it isn't an essential piece of season 2's puzzle, it was just '...and here’s what happens next, folks!' As twisting, messy, and high-quality as last week’s episode was, that's inevitable." Steve Ford of TV Fanatic gave the episode a perfect 5 star rating out of 5 and wrote, "'DUI' was yet another solid episode. It actually felt more like a season finale didn't it? Especially with the cliffhanger ending of Baal breaking out of hell."

Merrill Barr of Forbes wrote, "What Ash vs Evil Dead got right this week is not one thing, but many. Most notably, the crew behind the show knew the premise of chasing the demon spawns wasn't going to hold court for long. It was going to grow tired, so, to deal with that, the writers simply chose to end the plot line before even reaching the season's half-way point. Now, a new storyline has taken its place." Jasef Wisener of TV Overmind wrote, "'DUI' is yet another strong episode of Ash vs. Evil Dead in one of the best sophomore seasons of any series in television history, and it does a fantastic job of keeping the audience invested in the world that's been built. I can't wait to see what absolute insanity comes next, guys."
