= List of Offspring characters =

The characters of Offspring, an Australian drama television series are created by Debra Oswald with John Edwards and Imogen Banks.

== Main characters ==
=== Nina Proudman ===
Nina Proudman
- Offspring character
- Portrayed by: Asher Keddie; Alexandra Cashmere (young)
- First appearance: 15 August 2010
- Last appearance: 30 August 2017
In-universe information
- Occupation: Obstetrician
- Father: Phillip Noonan
- Mother: Geraldine Proudman
- Adoptive father: Darcy Proudman
- Brothers: Jimmy Proudman (half); Ray Proudman (half); Will Bowen (adoptive half)
- Sisters: Billie Proudman (half)
- Husband: Brendan Wright (ex-husband)
- Daughters: Zoe Proudman-Reid
- Nephews: Alfie Proudman; Patrick Proudman

Nina Proudman (played by Asher Keddie) is an obstetrician in her mid-thirties, known for her incredibly capable and caring nature. However, despite her proficiencies in her work-life, Nina constantly struggles with bouts of uncertainty, which both helps and hinders her in her quest for love, fulfillment, and balance in the chaos of modern life.

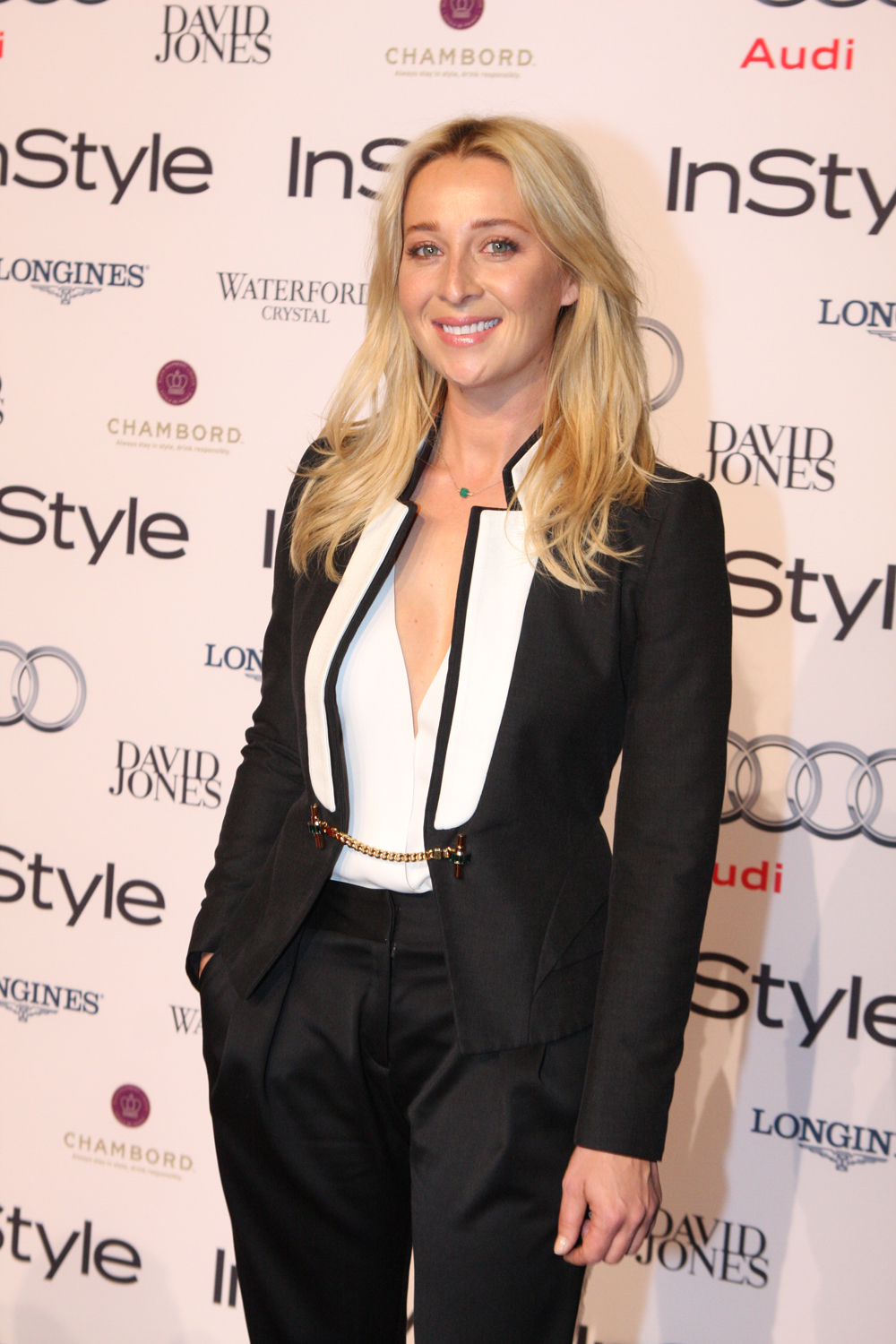
Asher Keddie plays Nina Proudman.

In the first season, Nina is involved in a relationship with married doctor Chris Havel. The relationship between the two ultimately comes to an end at the conclusion of the second series.

In the second season, Nina enters a short relationship with a more junior doctor, obstetric registrar Fraser King (Jay Ryan).

Later in Season 2, Nina meets Dr. Patrick Reid, an anaesthetist with a troubled past, and best friend of director of obstetrics, Dr. Martin Clegg.

Season 3 sees Nina happily in love with Patrick, when her apartment is destroyed by fire, and shortly afterward, she discovers that she is not biologically related to the man she knows as her father. Nina and Patrick decide to move in together. Nina discovers the identity of her biological father. Nina and Patrick break up, and Patrick decides to take a job at a different hospital. At Nina's 35th birthday party, in the final episode of the season, Patrick and Nina reunite and find out they are expecting a baby.

In season four, Nina's adventures progress as she and partner Dr Patrick Reid prepare for the birth of their first child together. Toward the end of the season, Patrick calls her to tell her he had been hit by a car while crossing the street (a 'hit and run'). She goes to pick him up, but he passes out while she is driving him home, and she diverts to the closest hospital. As Nina awaits news, Patrick's sister Kate arrives, and together they are told that Patrick has not survived his injuries. Nina chooses to turn off life support and donate Patrick's organs.

In the season finale of season 4, Nina is distraught after losing Patrick, and in desperate need of support from Billie. They both spend a night in a hotel where she goes into labour. Billie drives her to St. Francis, where Nina gives birth to a daughter, assisted by Billie, in the ward where Nina works. Nina names her daughter Zoe.

Season Five sees Nina struggling six months on from Patrick's death. After an awkward attempt at semi-anonymous casual sex, she later meets the man, Leo, again when he is hired as a new midwife at St. Francis. She befriends him and then ventures out on to the dating scene with the support of her friends and family. She starts seeing single dad Thomas, who is later revealed to still be married when his heavily pregnant wife arrives in an emergency to St. Francis. Nina eventually finds love with Leo, realising that what she was searching for was right in front of her all along. However, the romance winds up being short-lived, with Nina then finding love with crisis management specialist Harry Crewe. Nina ultimately finds out she is pregnant with Harry's child.

=== Billie Proudman ===
Billie Proudman
- Offspring character
- Portrayed by: Kat Stewart; Virginia Cashmere (young)
- First appearance: 15 August 2010
- Last appearance: 30 August 2017
In-universe information
- Occupation: Realtor and Head Hunter; Owner, Proudman Real Estate; House stylist; Employment consultant
- Father: Darcy Proudman
- Mother: Geraldine Proudman
- Brothers: Jimmy Proudman (brother); Ray Proudman (half-brother); Will Bowen (half-brother)
- Sisters: Nina Proudman (half-sister)
- Husband: Mick Holland (ex-husband)
- Children: 1 miscarriage (2011) with Mick; 2 abortions (in her teens)
- Nephews: Alfie Proudman; Patrick Proudman
- Nieces: Zoe Proudman-Reid

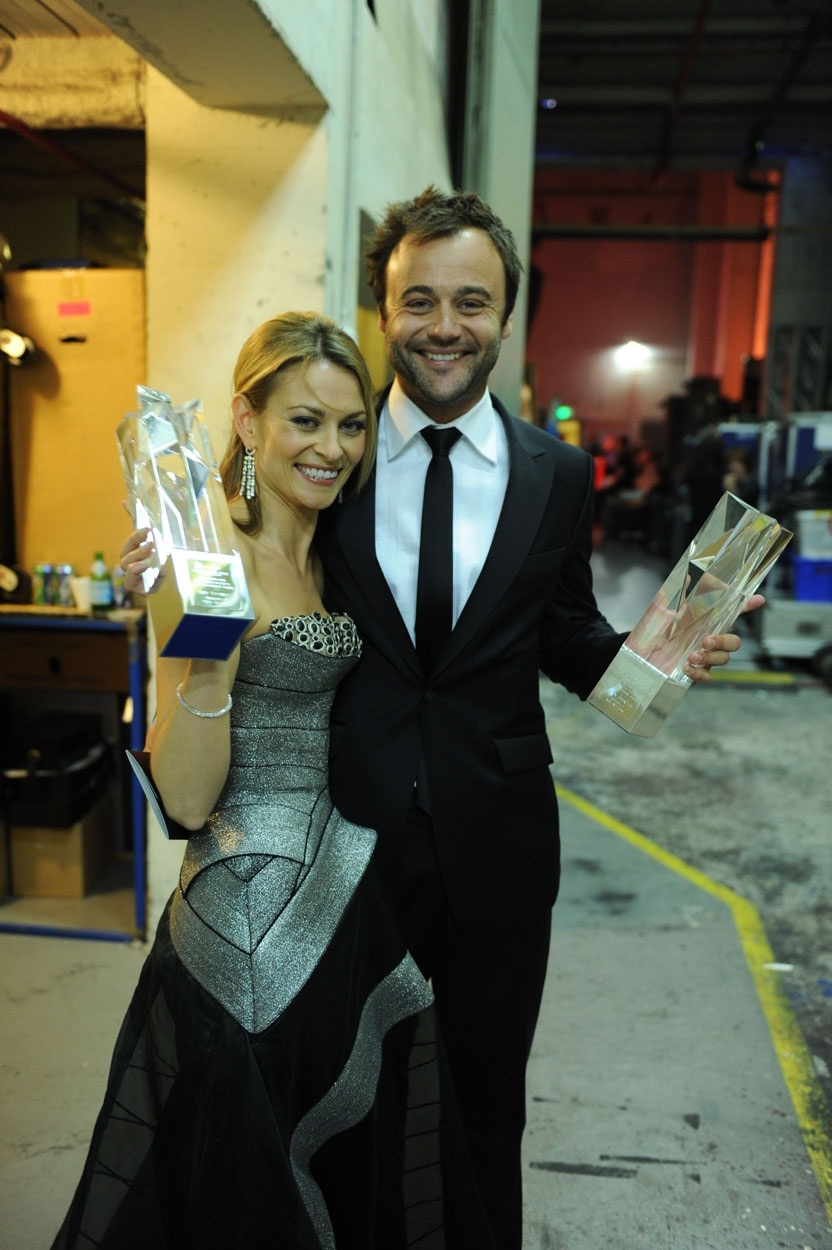
Kat with actor Gyton Grantley.

Billie Proudman (played by Kat Stewart) is Nina's boisterous older sister, she is bold, brassy, and incapable of lying. At constant war with Nina's golden girl image within the family, Billie, who was once the wild child, is determined to put her wayward youth behind her, and become something great.

In Series 4, letting go her dream of starting a family with husband Mick, Billie sets out to prove herself professionally by taking over Darcy's real estate business. However, after she drives the business into the ground and ends up selling it to Darcy's business rival, Billie has a breakdown and separates from Mick.

In Season 5, Billie has a relationship with Nina's former counsellor, Lawrence Pethbridge, but to Lawrence's sadness, she eventually reunites with Mick.

Billie moves to the UK to manage Mick's tour, but returns to Melbourne at the start of Season 6 to be with the family in the aftermath of Darcy's death. She decides to stay for her family and to support Brody, the teenage pregnant daughter of her former friend, Stacey.

In the midst of all this. Tensions arise between Mick and Billie and eventually the two decide to break-up for good. As the urging of her co-worker Kerry Green, Billie starts building a sex wall, but one of her bricks winds up being Dan. He happens to intrigue her and, ultimately, she wants to pursue more with him.

=== Jimmy Proudman ===
Jimmy Proudman
- Offspring character
- Portrayed by: Richard Davies; Flynn Curry (young)
- First appearance: 15 August 2010
- Last appearance: 30 August 2017
In-universe information
- Occupation: Barman Labourer Stay-at-home dad Owner, Jimmy's Taqueria Uber driver
- Father: Darcy Proudman
- Mother: Geraldine Proudman
- Brothers: Ray Proudman (half-brother); Will Bowen (half-brother)
- Sisters: Billie Proudman (sister); Nina Proudman (half-sister)
- Wife: Zara Perkich (2014-present)
- Sons: Alfie Proudman; Patrick Proudman
- Nieces: Zoe Proudman-Reid

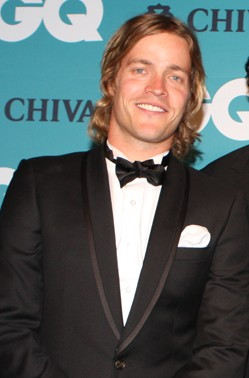
Richard Davies actor Jimmy Proudman

Jimmy Proudman (played by Richard Davies) is Nina and Billie's younger brother. Jimmy is a free spirit, and has a thirst for experience. Unfortunately for Jimmy, his yearning to live a life of good times can sometimes clash with the rest of the Proudman clan. The introduction of Tammy sees Jimmy make the decision to settle down, however this is short-lived when Tammy leaves him at the altar after their whirlwind engagement. After a fling with Zara, a midwife at the hospital, Jimmy is forced to reassess his life.

At the start of the fourth series, nervous first-time parents Jimmy and Zara bring their son Alfie home from hospital.

Jimmy successfully opens three 'pop up' taquerias.

He married Zara in season 5 while she was giving birth to their second son, Patrick. Jimmy's and Zara's son Alfie was diagnosed with a liver issue and needs an urgent liver transplant, finally Geraldine decides to donate her liver to Alfie, the transplant is successful, and both Geraldine and Alfie are alive and recuperating. Jimmy then decides to open a permanent taqueria restaurant.

In Season 6 the taqueria is suffering financially, and after Darcy's death Jimmy reveals the restaurant had been propped up by a loan from Darcy. The newly reunited Proudman brother, Will, offers to invest in the restaurant; and after Jimmy refuses, buys the restaurant anonymously. This simple, yet complex act of love from Will, creates a lot of tension between the two brothers and it took a very long time for Jimmy to let go of Will's selfish deed and build their relationship as brothers. Hard to believe all it took for Jimmy to accept Will was for Will to run around a wedding reception in his birthday suit. From there, they build an inseparable brotherly bond. Jimmy then starts a new career as an Uber driver. When the Union Club Hotel Pub's resident cooks are deported, Zara urges Jimmy to take over with doing what he does best, cooking authentic Mexican food.

=== Mick Holland ===
Mick Holland
- Offspring character
- Portrayed by: Eddie Perfect
- First appearance: 15 August 2010
- Last appearance: 27 July 2016
In-universe information
- Occupation: Musician Gardener
- Brothers: Andrew Holland
- Wife: Billie Proudman
- Nephews: Alfie Proudman; Patrick Proudman
- Nieces: Zoe Proudman-Reid

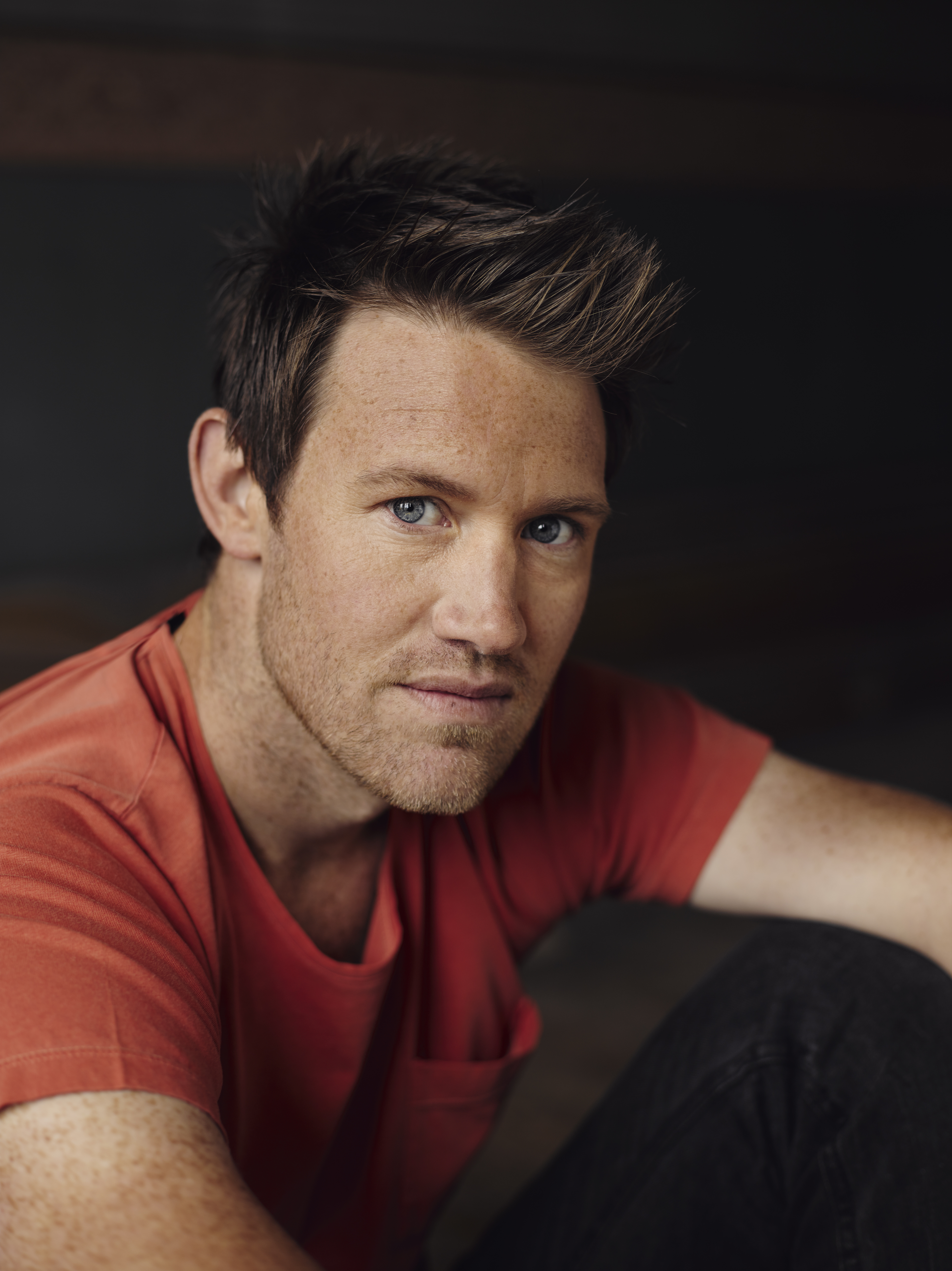
Eddie Perfect plays Mick Holland

Mick Holland (played by Eddie Perfect) is Billie's husband. Mick is a hard working, fun-loving guy, who spends half his time labouring and other half making music. His idea of happiness is a day spent with the woman he loves, and his dog. When Billie and Mick plan to start a family, Mick's forced to confront his demons and contact his estranged brother. Mick's best friend is Billie's and Nina's younger brother Jimmy.

Mick has finally realised his dream to become a full-time musician and his collaboration with Rosanna Harding has continued to grow and make an impact on the indie music scene.

Mick and Billie have given up their plan to have children, the couple focuses on their respective careers.

In Season 5, Billie finally made-up her mind after breaking up with Lawrence Pethbridge, and as a result there was a happy reunion between her and Mick and confessed to Mick that he is the love of her life. She flies off to the UK to manage Mick's tour with his partner Rosanna

In Season 6 Mick Holland becomes a recurring character, as he remains in the UK to finish his tour while Billie returns to Melbourne.

=== Geraldine Proudman ===
Geraldine Proudman
- Offspring character
- Portrayed by: Linda Cropper
- First appearance: 15 August 2010
- Last appearance: 17 August 2017
In-universe information
- Occupation: Architectural Model Maker
- Husband: Darcy Proudman (ex)
- Sons: Jimmy Proudman
- Daughters: Billie Proudman; Nina Proudman
- Grandsons: Alfie Proudman; Patrick Proudman
- Granddaughters: Zoe Proudman-Reid

Geraldine Proudman (played by Linda Cropper) is mother to the three eldest Proudman children. Geraldine works as an architectural model maker and is a creative and intelligent woman. She is passionately connected to each of her children, but is also committed to making the most of her own life.

After the birth of Darcy's son Ray, Geraldine explored new romantic territory but soon found herself back in her husband's arms. However, when Nina's true parentage was revealed, Geraldine was drawn back to her old flame, Dr. Phillip Noonan.

During Season 5, Geralidne decides to donate her liver to Alfie, the transplant is successful, and both Geraldine and Alfie are alive and recuperating.

Geraldine, along with everyone else, is rocked by Darcy's death at the beginning of Season 6, and even more so after discovering he had fathered a son with her friend and neighbour Marjorie, during a marriage separation.

=== Darcy Proudman ===
Darcy Proudman
- Offspring character
- Portrayed by: John Waters
- First appearance: 15 August 2010
- Last appearance: 6 August 2014
In-universe information
- Occupation: Real Estate Agent; Owner of Darcy Proudman Real Estate
- Wife: Geraldine Proudman (ex)
- Sons: Jimmy Proudman; Ray Proudman; Will Bowen
- Daughters: Billie Proudman; Nina Proudman (adoptive)
- Grandsons: Alfie Proudman; Patrick Proudman
- Granddaughters: Zoe Proudman-Reid

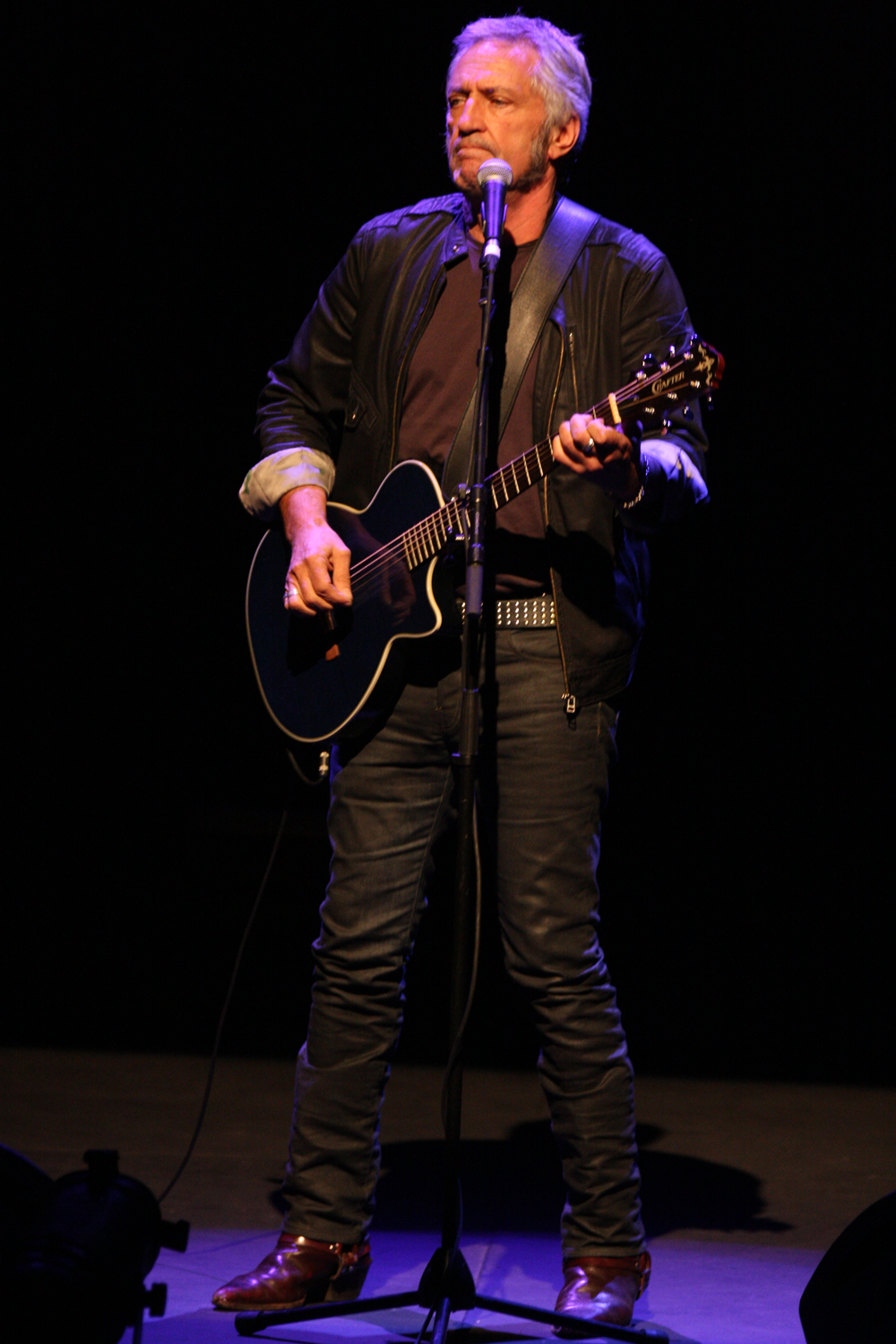
John Waters plays Darcy Proudman.

Darcy Proudman (played by John Waters) is charming, devoted and passionate, Darcy is Billie and Jimmy's father. He also loves women.

He was never the type of man who could settle down forever with one person, loving women is too much a part of who he is, and hence Geraldine and Darcy have been separated for some time. However, after suffering a serious heart attack his willingness to commit to Geraldine is rekindled. He owns a real estate agency in which Billie also works.

Darcy's the proud father of Ray, born from a cruise ship fling with Cherie, his daughter Nina's friend and workmate.

At the opening of Season 6, while on a cruise, Darcy had another heart attack from which he did not survive.

Soon after, it is discovered he has an adult son, Will, fathered with his and Geraldine's former neighbour and friend, Marjorie.

=== Zara Perkich-Proudman ===
Zara Perkich
- Offspring character
- Portrayed by: Jane Harber
- First appearance: 15 August 2010
- Last appearance: 30 August 2017
In-universe information
- Occupation: Midwife Medical student
- Husband: Jimmy Proudman (2014-present)
- Sons: Alfie Proudman; Patrick Proudman
- Nieces: Zoe Proudman-Reid

Zara Perkich (played by Jane Harber) is nurse and midwife at St Francis. Zara is ambitious and focused. The popular girl at high school, Zara has grown into a hardnosed woman who knows how to play the game and always keeps part of herself separate. Flirtatious, highly sexual and open to a good time, Zara's been known to mix work with pleasure. Zara had a fling with Jimmy Proudman in season 3, which results in a surprise pregnancy.

At the start of the fourth series, nervous first-time parents Jimmy and Zara bring their son Alfie home from hospital.

Zara and Jimmy get married in season 5 while she is giving birth to their second son, Patrick (named for Nina's dead partner). Later Zara and Jimmy's son Alfie is diagnosed with a liver issue and needs an urgent liver transplant. Geralidne decides to donate her liver to Alfie, the transplant is successful, and both Geraldine and Alfie are alive and recuperating.

Following Alfie's ordeal, Zara decides to apply to study medicine, with an ambition to become a paediatrician.

In Season 6 Zara is a full-time medical student, and struggles to juggle the demands of family, study and marriage, particularly after Jimmy's taqueria is sold.

=== Martin Clegg ===
Martin Clegg
- Offspring character
- Portrayed by: Lachy Hulme
- First appearance: 22 August 2010
- Last appearance: 12 July 2017
In-universe information
- Occupation: Director of Obstetrics; Senior Obstetric Specialist
- Wife: Cherie Butterfield
- Daughters: Stella Akerholt

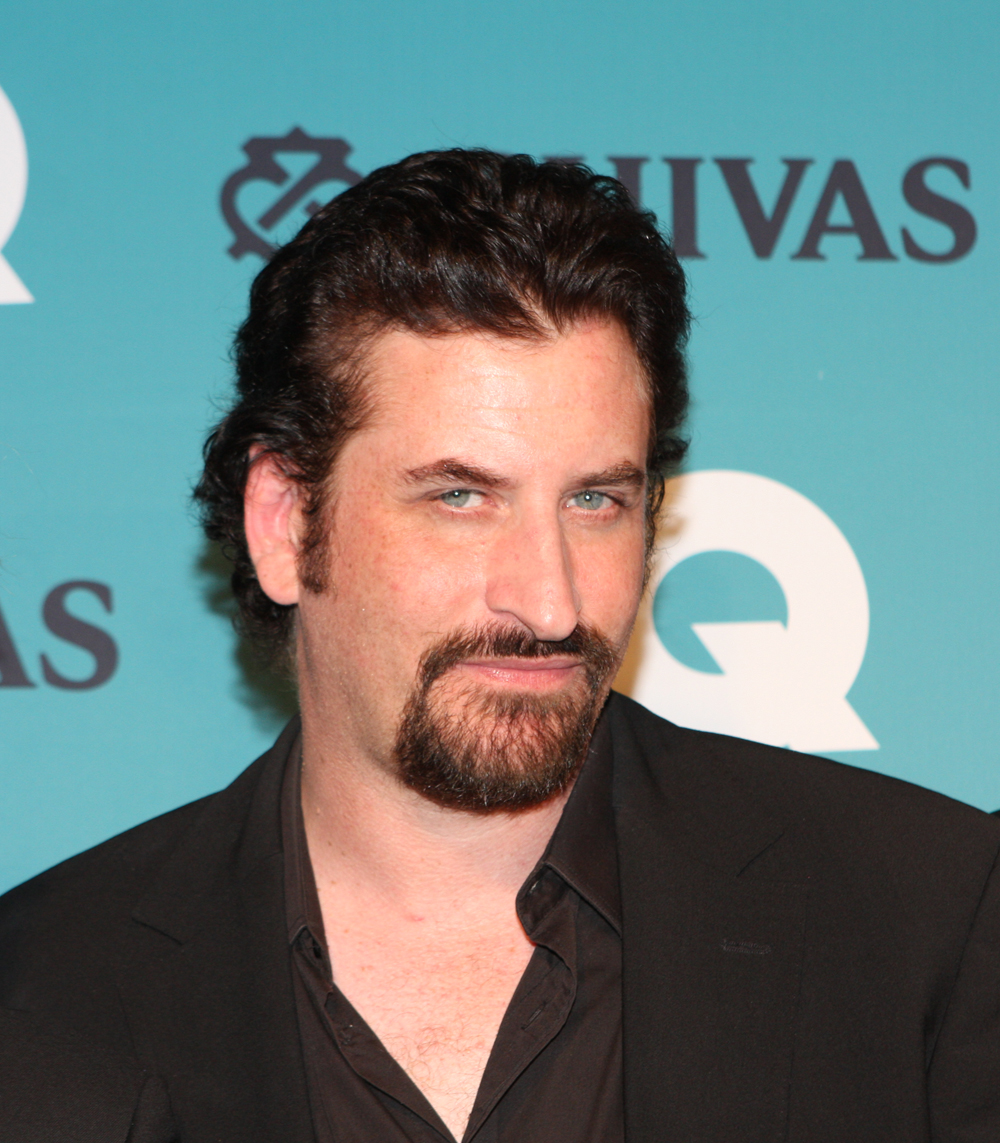
Lachy Hulme plays Martin Clegg.

Martin Clegg (played by Lachy Hulme) is the Director of Obstetrics and Senior Obstetric Specialist at St Francis Hospital.

He is brilliant (he holds both a Ph.D. and M.D.) and eccentric, who considers Patrick Reid one of his closest friends.

Martin is the father (by donation) of Kim's daughter Stella.

He is in an on-again, off-again relationship with colleague and midwife Cherie Butterfield. In Season 6, they marry, with Nina standing as Martin's 'best man'.

=== Cherie Butterfield ===
Cherie Butterfield
- Offspring character
- Portrayed by: Deborah Mailman
- First appearance: 15 August 2010
- Last appearance: 30 August 2017
In-universe information
- Occupation: Midwife
- Husband: Martin Clegg
- Sons: Ray Proudman

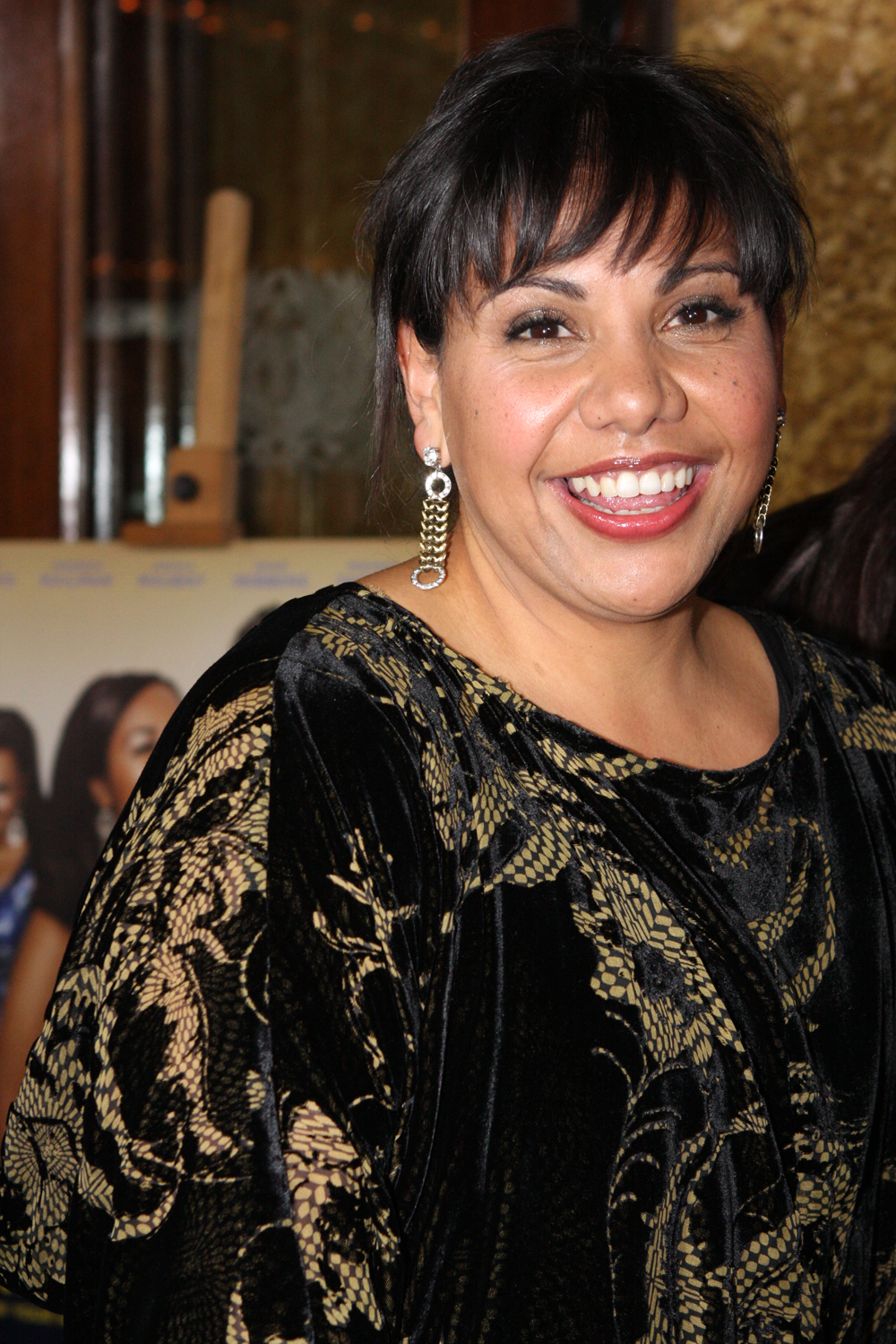
Deborah Mailman plays Cherie Butterfield.

Cherie Butterfield (played by Deborah Mailman) is a midwife, and colleague of Nina's. Adopted into a strict religious family with whom she had virtually nothing in common, Cherie thought that she was destined to be a loner in life.

She is thrust into the Proudman family spotlight at the commencement of Season 1, when it is discovered that Darcy is the father of her soon to be born child. She gives birth to a son, Ray, and is accepted as a member of the Proudman family. She goes on to develop a strong and respectful friendship with Darcy.

In season 3 Cherie starts a relationship with Dr Martin Clegg, and by Season 6 proposes.

=== Will Bowen ===
Will Bowen
- Offspring character
- Portrayed by: T.J. Power
- First appearance: 29 June 2016
- Last appearance: 30 August 2017
In-universe information
- Occupation: Lawyer
- Father: Darcy Proudman
- Mother: Marjorie Van Dyke
- Brothers: Jimmy Proudman; Ray Proudman
- Sisters: Billie Proudman, Nina Proudman
- Wife: Kerry Green

Will Bowen (played by T.J. Power) is a lawyer who initially consulted with Darcy Proudman to start writing his will, only to find that it was a ruse for Darcy to tell him that he was his biological father. Darcy dies soon after, but Will then meets Darcy's children when settling Darcy's estate: Billie, Nina, and Jimmy. Will is excited at the prospect at having siblings as he grew up an only child. While he is more than willing to help any of them, he has a much stronger bond with Jimmy. Will tries to impose his business sense in selling Jimmy's business, causing friction between the two. Billie introduces her boss, Kerry Green, to him as a set up, who then both hit it off as a couple together. Will wins over Jimmy by streaking naked at Martin and Cherie's wedding, with Jimmy joining him. However, when Kerry walks out of Will's life, a newly separated Jimmy and Kerry have a sexual union, prompting more tension when Will finds out. Will is still a serious professional, giving Jimmy half the proceeds of the sale of Jimmy's taco business, even though he feels betrayed by him. Will and Kerry ultimately reconcile, going off to Fiji on a moment's notice, and coming back married. Kerry divulges that she cannot have children, but this does not affect Will's love for Kerry even though having children was part of his (ideal) 10-year plan.

== Recurring characters ==
=== Kim Akerholt ===
Kim Akerholt
- Offspring character
- Portrayed by: Alicia Gardiner
- First appearance: 15 August 2010
- Last appearance: 30 August 2017
In-universe information
- Occupation: Midwife Midwifery Unit Manager
- Daughters: Stella Akerholt Clegg

Kim Akerholt (played by Alicia Gardiner) is a 30-year-old nurse, Kim loves gossip and a filthy joke. Astute and direct, Kim is a brave and loving woman. Sensitive and funny, she often looks to Nina for support and guidance, while also dishing out her own advice.

A lesbian in a long-term relationship with girlfriend Renee, Kim fell pregnant via a sperm donation from Clegg and now juggles a career and caring for daughter, Stella. Kim and Renee eventually split up, but Kim finds love again with her new partner, Jess.

During Season 5, unaware that Cherie and Martin are seeing each other, secretly, Kim told Cherie that she wants to try having another child with Martin.

=== Kerry Green ===
Kerry Green
- Offspring character
- Portrayed by: Ash Ricardo
- First appearance: 3 August 2016
- Last appearance: 30 August 2017
In-universe information
- Occupation: Employment Agency Recruiter
- Husband: Will Bowen

Kerry Green (played by Ash Ricardo) first appears in season 6, meeting with Billie who's seeking new employment. Eventually, Kerry is so impressed by Billie's abilities that she hires her to be part of her employment agency. Billie then tries to set Kerry up with her newly discovered half-brother, Will Bowen. The two start to get serious but an incident involving their new dog, Greg, prompts Kerry to run away. Kerry and Will are estranged for a while but get back together, even going off to Fiji spontaneously, and then returning to Melbourne as a married couple. Kerry is not comfortable in her new role as a wife, as she is keeping a secret from Will: she cannot have children, something Will has wanted according to his 10-year plan.

=== Alfie Proudman ===
Alfie Proudman, (played by actors Ben & Sam Hunter, Teah Whalan, Cleo Mete).

His parents are Jimmy Proudman and nurse Zara Perkich, he has a younger brother Patrick Proudman.

=== Zoe Proudman-Reid ===
Zoe Proudman-Reid, (portrayed by actresses Mia & Willow Sindle and Isabella Monaghan), was born in 2013 the day after her father's funeral.

Her parents are Dr. Patrick Reid and Dr. Nina Proudman. She had an older half-brother Gus Reid who died at birth.

=== Phil D'Arabont ===
Phil D'Arabont
- Offspring character
- Portrayed by: David Roberts
- First appearance: 6 June 2011
- Last appearance: 30 August 2017
In-universe information
- Occupation: Real Estate Agent

Phil D'Arabont is the former real estate nemesis of Darcy Proudman. Billie sold Darcy Proudman Real Estate to Phil D'Arabont. Phil D'Arabont is now dating Geraldine as it is hard at her age to "make friends" (season 7 episode 10). Although the Proudman children disapprove of this relationship, they will eventually come to accept Phil D'Arabont into their weird and confusing family tree when a new Proudman is discovered, someone dies, or someone makes a drastic life change. Phil D'Arabont has a secret: he loves to dance and whips out some impressive moves at Kerry and half-brother Proudman's (not Ray) wedding celebrations at a pub in the middle of the day.

== Former main characters ==
=== Patrick Reid ===
Patrick Reid
- Offspring character
- Portrayed by: Matthew Le Nevez
- First appearance: 16 May 2011
- Last appearance: 31 August 2016
In-universe information
- Occupation: Anaesthetist
- Father: Tadgh Reid
- Sisters: Kate Reid
- Wife: Jodie (divorced)
- Sons: Gus Reid (deceased)
- Daughters: Zoe Proudman-Reid
- Nieces: Isabella Reid

Patrick Reid (played by Matthew Le Nevez) is an anaesthetist who initially works with Nina at St Francis. He moves to the fictional The Ainsworth Hospital in season 3.

When Patrick and Nina first meet they engage each other in regular niggles as a result of Nina's misjudgement of Patrick. However a relationship slowly evolves. Their relationship is tested with the reappearance of Chris Havel (Don Hany), Nina's old flame. Patrick and Nina's relationship is rocky throughout season 2 and season 3. In season 3 they move in together only to break up not long after. In the final episode of series 3, Patrick and Nina reunite and also find out they are expecting a baby.

Patrick has one sister Kate who is a single mother to her daughter Isabella. Their relationship as siblings is close yet they appear critical of their parents' marriage. He has been married once before and suffered the loss of a son who was stillborn. This deeply affected Patrick and forms the basis for many of his emotional insecurities and relationship problems that continue to plague him.

Patrick gets hit by a car in season 4, episode 12. Patrick calls Nina who comes to his aid. On the way to the hospital, Patrick loses consciousness whilst Nina is frantically driving in distress. Patrick is admitted for surgery but doesn't survive. A few weeks after his death his partner Nina gives birth to their first child, a daughter, named Zoe Proudman-Reid.

=== Chris Havel ===
Chris Havel
- Offspring character
- Portrayed by: Don Hany
- First appearance: 15 August 2010
- Last appearance: 20 July 2011
In-universe information
- Occupation: Paediatrician
- Wife: Alice Havel (ex)
- Daughters: Lucy Havel

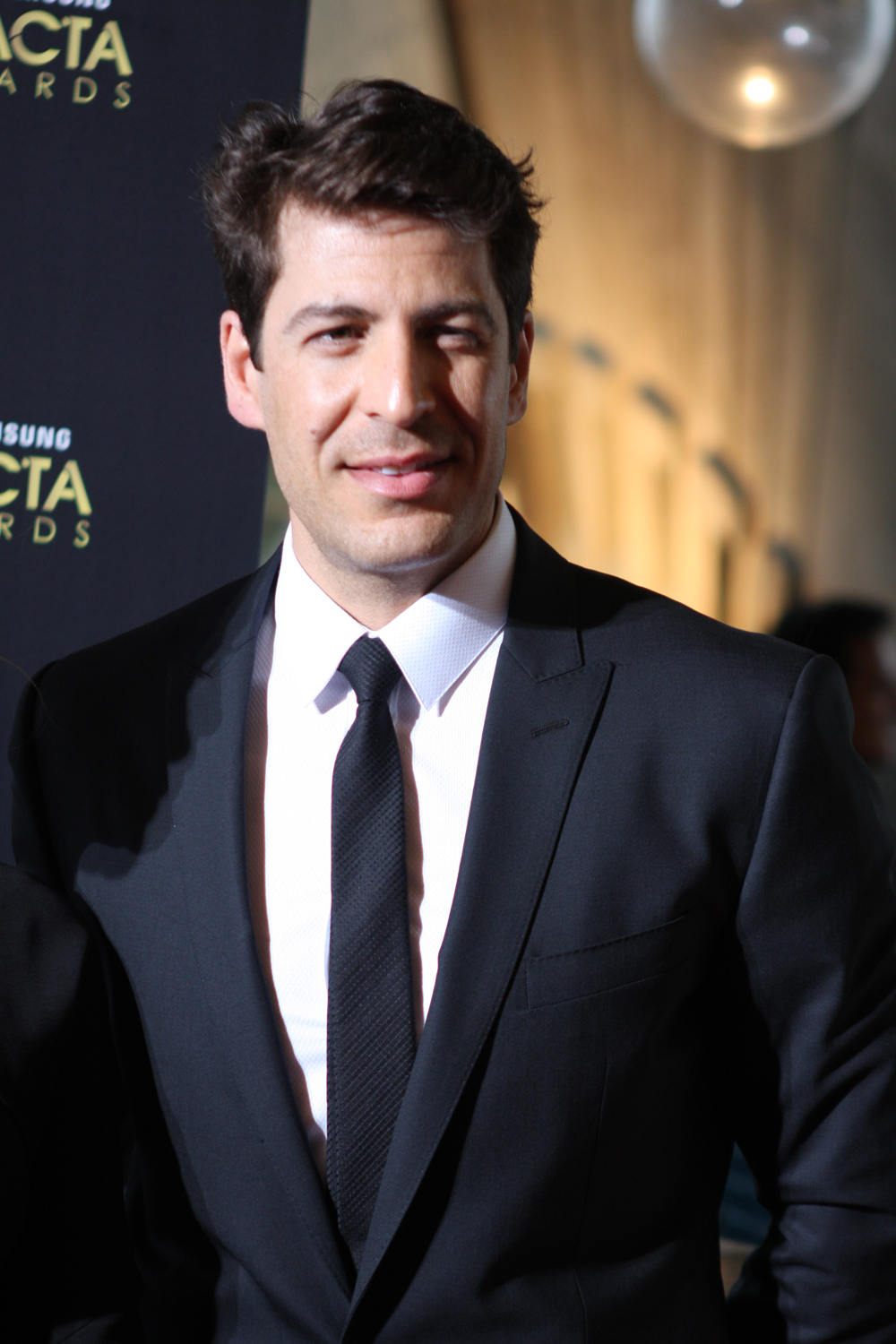
Don Hany plays Chris Havel.

Chris Havel (played by Don Hany) is introduced as the new paediatrician at the maternity department in which Nina works. Initially sparks fly between Chris and Nina, but their relationship becomes complicated on the arrival of Chris' estranged wife.

The relationship between the two ultimately comes to an end at the conclusion of the second series.

=== Lawrence Pethbridge ===
Lawrence Pethbridge
- Offspring character
- Portrayed by: Ido Drent
- First appearance: 22 May 2013
- Last appearance: 29 June 2016
In-universe information
- Occupation: Counsellor
- Children: 1

Lawrence Pethbridge (played by Ido Drent) is a counsellor. Lawrence is noted for being calm, rational, composed and constructive. There's something hypnotic about his attentive listening and his considered observations.

His personal life is quite chaotic—beset by tumultuous relationships and a dysfunctional family.

He is introduced to the series when he begins to counsel Nina and Patrick in Season 3.

In Season 5, Lawrence has a brief relationship with Billie Proudman.

In Season 6, it is revealed that he is in a relationship with Maddy (Katherine Hicks) who gives birth to their first child.

=== Leo Taylor ===
Leo Taylor
- Offspring character
- Portrayed by: Patrick Brammall
- First appearance: 28 May 2014
- Last appearance: 3 August 2016
In-universe information
- Occupation: Midwife

Leo Taylor (played by Patrick Brammall) and Nina first meet at the airport, and embark on an ultimately disastrous attempt to have a one-night stand. Nina is days later mortified to discovered Leo is the new midwife at St Francis.

During Season 5, Leo and Nina become friends, and he was the first person to discover Thomas' duplicity.

At the start of Season 6, Leo is recovering after Nina has broken his heart, and decides to return to his hometown of Adelaide.

=== Thomas Buchdahl ===
Thomas Buchdahl (played by Ben Barrington). Thomas is Nina's new boyfriend in Season 5, and presents himself as a fellow single parent. Soon Nina is confronted with the fact her new lover is actually still married, and his wife Mia is heavily pregnant. His secret came out when a birth complication forced Thomas and his unknowing wife to Nina's hospital instead of the maternity ward they had planned.

== Former recurring characters ==
=== Kate Reid ===
Kate Reid (played by Kate Jenkinson), is Patricks's sister. Kate is first introduced in Season 2 when she is in labour at St Francis and is being supported by Patrick. Kate is a vocal supporter of her brother, and develops a close relationship with Nina.

=== Eloise Ward ===
Eloise Ward (played by Caren Pistorius) is a young obstetric registrar whose cool exterior masks a great deal of insecurity. All throughout medical school, while her fellow students partied hard, Eloise kept a tight focus on her schedule and her studies.

She's never been in a fully-fledged romantic relationship, and has always been too reserved to form a tight circle of friends.

She forms a friendship with Patrick, but harbours feelings for Nina.

=== Joseph Green ===
Joseph Green (played by Kevin Hofbauer) is introduced as a bicycle courier, who ultimately has a relationship with Kate Reid. Joseph & Kate start a new life together in the United States.

=== Rosanna Harding ===
Rosanna Harding (played by Clare Bowditch). Single parent and Mick's musical partner.

=== Andrew Holland ===
Andrew Holland (played by Dan Spielman). Mick Holland's brother, and therefore Billie Proudman's brother-in-law. Agrees to help Billie and Mick have a child by donating sperm. Andrew considers himself to be the black sheep of the family, as his father never accepted his homosexuality.

=== Fraser King ===
Fraser King (played by Jay Ryan) is introduced as a new obstetric registrar in Season 2. Fraser started a short relationship with Nina, which comes to an end at the conclusion of the second series.

=== Phillip Noonan ===
Phillip Noonan (played by Garry McDonald) is a 60's year old doctor, Noonan is an anxious man who, like his daughter Nina, is prone to over-thinking. Susceptible to infatuation but desperately unsure what to do with it, Noonan's mid-seventies affair with Geraldine Proudman was one of the few times he threw caution into the wind, and was guided by his heart not his head.

When the affair ended, he retreated back to his solitary ways for many decades. But now, in his sixties, Noonan has been given a second chance by Geraldine. Eventually the affair peters out, and Phillip starts seeing Dr Nadine Samir, whom he later marries.

=== Nadine Samir-Noonan ===
Nadine Samir-Noonan, played by Maude Davey, is a Doctor and Phillip Noonan's wife.
