= Ido Drent =

Actor

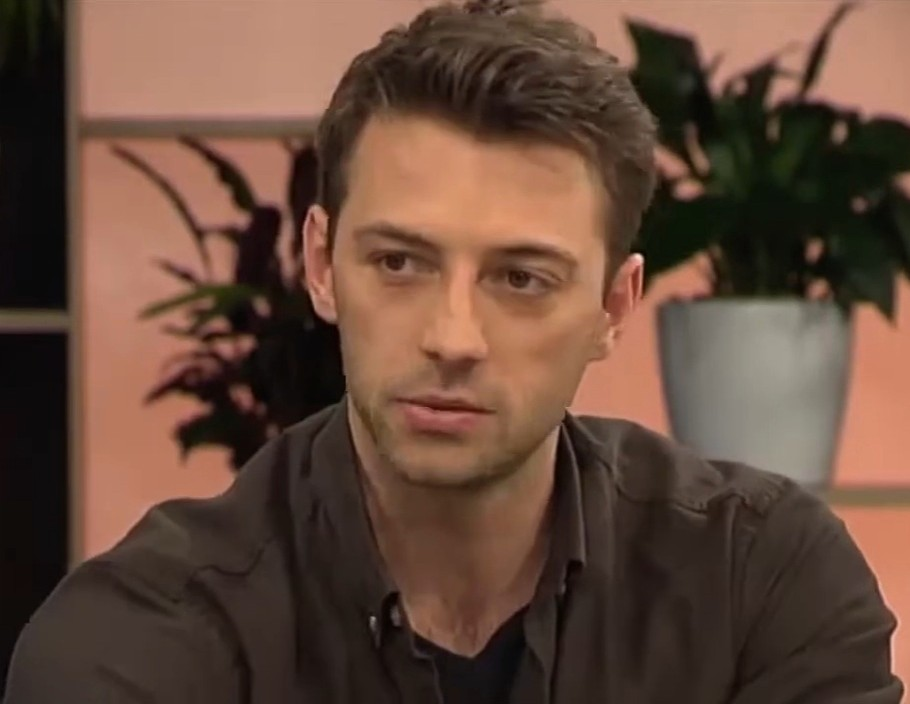
- Drent in 2017
- Born: 27 January 1987 (age 39); Pretoria, South Africa
- Occupation: Actor
- Years active: 2008–present
- Spouse: Mandy Hodges (m. 2011–present)

Ido Drent (born 27 January 1987) is a South African-born actor working and living in Auckland, New Zealand. He is best known to television audiences as Daniel Potts in the long-running soap opera Shortland Street.

== Early life ==
Drent was born in Pretoria and raised until the age of 8 in Potchefstroom, South Africa. In January 1996 Drent and his family moved to New Zealand. He remembers watching Shortland Street for the first time and being bewildered by the accents. After finishing school Drent studied business at university and worked in the property development industry. After doing part-time work in television commercials, Drent "caught the acting bug."

== Career ==
=== Beginnings and Shortland Street ===
Drent became a model, was signed to 11 Modeling Agency and quickly became a regular on the catwalk.

He started to attend a Meisner Acting course and in 2008 auditioned for an upcoming role on the long-running soap opera Shortland Street. The role was a recasting of past character Daniel Potts, the bad-boy illegitimate son of major character Sarah Potts. Drent was called back after his first audition, and, after performing alongside the actress of Sarah, Amanda Billing, he was awarded the role. He made his debut on the show in March 2009 and quickly picked up a heartthrob status.

For his role on Shortland Street, Drent was nominated and awarded with numerous awards, including in 2010 the New Zealand TV Guide Best on the Box award for "Rising Star". He also won runner up for "Hottest Male Actor" in the Throng Shortland Street Fan Awards 2010, losing out to onscreen stepfather Benjamin Mitchell. In 2011 Drent was nominated for a Girlfriend Faves Forever award for "Celeb Male 2011" for his role in Shortland Street and "Favourite TV star" in the What Now awards.

In 2012 Drent quit his role on Shortland Street to pursue career opportunities in Australia. He commented, "For me, broadening myself as an actor, I need to move on, even if it meant losing a bit of security and taking a big risk."

Following his move to Australia, Drent landed a role on the fourth season of television show Offspring, making his debut in May 2013. Drent was praised by his costar Matthew Le Nevez, "He's got such a nice, calming energy... He's such a great actor."

Drent also won the role of INXS drummer Jon Farriss in a miniseries depicting the band, INXS: Never Tear Us Apart.

== Personal life ==
Drent is heavily involved in exercise and loves coffee. He has a strong Christian faith and made a commitment to stay celibate until marriage. In April 2011 Drent announced he was engaged to makeup artist Mandy Hodges via his Facebook page. After dating for seven months, the two wed in December 2011 in a ceremony attended by family, friends, and co-stars. They have a son and a daughter.

=== Activism ===
Drent has been an ambassador for the 40 Hour Famine in 2010, 2011 and 2012, in which he helped needy children in East Timor. He was involved in a run which involved running 20 km a day for a week to raise money for Ronald McDonald House Charities. However, Drent was forced to drop out following feeling very ill and fearing he may have meningitis. Drent is also an advocate for anti-smoking New Zealand.

== Filmography ==
Film and television
Year	Title	Role	Notes
2009– 2012	Shortland Street	Daniel Potts	Core Cast; Won - "Rising Star", New Zealand TV Guide Best on the Box awards 2010; Won - "Celeb Male 2011", Girlfriend Faves Forever 2011; Nominated - "Favourite TV star", The Nowies 2011
2013– 2016	Offspring	Dr. Lawrence Pethbridge	Recurring (season 4); Main cast (season 5); Guest (season 6)
2014	INXS: Never Tear Us Apart	Jon Farriss	
2015	When We Go To War	Charles Smith	
2015	Ash vs Evil Dead	Brad	Episodes: "Ashes to Ashes", "Bound in Flesh"
2019	Roman Empire	Caligula	Main character during season 3 called the Mad Emperor. Produced by Netflix.
2019	The Gulf	D.S. Justin Harding	Main cast all episodes
2022	My Life Is Murder	Luke	"Silent Lights" Series 3 Ep 5
