= Tony Tilse =

Australian television director

Tony Tilse is an Australian television director. He won the Australian Directors' Guild Award for best direction of a TV drama series (periodical) and TV mini-series for Underbelly in 2008. Tilse also directed The Postcard Bandit, and Murder in the Outback, based upon the disappearance of British tourist Peter Falconio in the Australian outback in 2001 and docu-drama Scorched, which was based upon the events of the 2001 Black Christmas bushfires; as well as several episodes of sci-fi series Farscape.
