= The Major (play) =

- Original language: English
- Written by: Edward Harrigan
- Genre: Comedic play

Premiere
- Date: 29 August 1881
- Place: Theatre Comique (728-730 Broadway)

The Major is an 1881 comedic play produced by Edward Harrigan and Tony Hart.

It debuted to a full house at the new Theatre Comique on Broadway in New York City on August 29, 1881. Songs contributed by David Braham include "Major Gilfeather", "Miranda, When We Are Made One", "Veteran's Guards' Cadets", "Clara Jenkins' Tea" and "4-11-44". It ran for over 150 performances, closing on January 7, 1882, the longest of any Harrigan and Hart production at that time.

The play was revived in March 1885 at the Fourteenth Street Theatre.

== Cast ==
- Edward Harrigan as Major Gilfeather
- Annie Mack as Arabella Pinch
- Tony Hart as Henry Higgins
- Marie Gorenflo at Amelia
- Edward Burt as Granville Bright
- Annie Yeamans as Miranda Biggs
- Michael F. Drew as Percival Popp
- Gertie Granville as Henrietta
