= Yeamans =

Yeamans is a surname. Notable people with the surname include:

- Annie Yeamans (1835–1912), American actress
- Isabel Yeamans (1637–1704), English Quaker preacher
- Jennie Yeamans (1862–1906), Australian-born child actress and singer
- John Yeamans (1611–1674), English colonial administrator
- John Yeamans (politician) (1735–1824), Canadian politician from New Brunswick
- Lydia Yeamans or Lydia Yeamans Titus (1857–1929), American singer, dancer, and comedienne
- Robert Yeamans (died 1643), English merchant

== See also ==
- Yeaman
