= Harrigan 'N Hart =

Harrigan 'N Hart is a musical with a book by Michael Stewart, lyrics by Peter Walker, and music by Max Showalter. The show is based on the book The Merry Partners by Ely Jacques Kahn, Jr. and material found by Nedda Harrigan Logan. The show opened at the Longacre Theatre on January 31, 1985, and closed on February 3, 1985, after 25 previews and 4 performances.

== Synopsis ==
The show follows the rise of Edward Harrigan and Tony Hart, better known as Harrigan & Hart, and their later decline.

== Song list ==
Act I

- "Put Me in My Little Bed"—Tony Hart
- "Wonderful Me"—Edward Harrigan and Tony Hart
- "Mulligan Guard"—Edward Harrigan and Tony Hart
- "Put Me in My Little Bed (Reprise)"—Tony Hart
- "I Love to Follow a Band"—Edward Harrigan and Company
- "Such an Education Has My Mary Ann"—Edward Harrigan, Tony Hart and Company
- "Maggie Murphy's Home"—Annie Braham Harrigan, Edward Harrigan, Sam Nichols and Company
- "McNally's Row of Flats"—Mrs. Annie Yeamons and Company
- "Something New, Something Different"—Edward Harrigan, Tony Hart and Company
- "That's My Partner"—Edward Harrigan and Tony Hart
- "She's Our Gretel"—Edward Harrigan, Tony Hart, Mrs. Annie Yeamons and Company
- "What You Need Is a Woman"—Gerta Granville
- "Knights of the Mystic Star"—Mrs. Annie Yeamons and Company
- "Girl of the Mystic Star"—Gerta Granville and Men
- "Mulligan Guard (Reprise)"—Edward Harrigan and Tony Hart

Act II

- "Skidmore Fancy Ball"—Sam Nichols, Harry Mack, Johnny Wild and Billy Gross
- "Sweetest Love"—Ada Lewis and Elsie Fay
- "The Old Barn Floor"—Johnny Wild, Jennie Yeamons, Chester Fox and Lily Fay
- "Silly Boy"—Gerta Granville, Billy Gross and Harry Mack
- "Mulligan Guard (Reprise)"—Edward Harrigan, Tony Hart and Company
- "We'll Be There"—Edward Harrigan, Tony Hart and Company
- "Ada With the Golden Hair"—Annie Braham Harrigan, Johnny Wild and Billy Gross
- "That Old Featherbed"—Harry Mack and Fay Sisters
- "Sam Johnson's Colored Cakewalk"—Sam Nichols and Jennie Yeamons
- "Dip Me in the Golden Sea"—Edward Harrigan, Mrs. Annie Yeamons and Company
- "That's My Partner (Reprise)"—Edward Harrigan
- "I've Come Home to Stay"—Tony Hart
- "If I Could Trust Me"—Tony Hart
- "Maggie Murphy's Home (Reprise)"—Martin Hanley, Lily Fay, Mrs. Annie Yeamons and Ada Lewis
- "I've Come Home to Stay (Reprise)"—Tony Hart and Girls
- "I Need This One Chance"—Gerta Granville
- "I Love to Follow a Band (Reprise)"—Annie Braham Harrigan and Company
- "Mulligan Guard (Reprise)"—Edward Harrigan, Tony Hart and Mrs. Annie Yeamons
- "Something New, Something Different (Reprise)"—Edward Harrigan, Tony Hart and Company

== Original production ==
The show was directed by Joe Layton, songs of the period by Edward Harrigan and David Braham, based on material compiled by Nedda Harrigan Logan and The Merry Partners by E.J. Kahn Jr., scenic design by David Mitchell, costume design by Ann Hould-Ward, lighting design by Richard Nelson, music supervision, orchestrations and arrangements by John McKinney, musical director Peter Howard, sound design by Otts Munderloh, production stage manager Mary Porter Hall, choreographed by K.J. Giagni. Presented by Elliot Martin, Arnold Bernhard and The Shubert Organization.

The cast included Harry Groener (Harrigan), Mark Hamill (Hart), Mark Fotopoulos (Stetson, Andrew LeCouvrier, Judge, Jonny Wild, Captain and William Gill), Clent Bowers (Archie White, Sam Nichols, Felix Barker and Uncle Albers), Cleve Asbury (Old Colonel, Billy Gross and Nat Goodwin), Barbara Moroz (The Colonel's Wife, Elsie Fay and Belle), Roxie Lucas (Eleanor and Ada Lewis), Oliver Woodall (Martin Hanley), Christopher Wells (Alfred J. Dugan, Harry Mack, Judge Hilton, and Doctor), Tudi Roche (Annie Braham Harrigan), Kenstom Ames (Chester Fox, Photographer, Newsboy and Newspaperman), Merilee Magnuson (Lily Fay, Adelaide Harrigan and Jurse), Armelia McQueen (Mrs. Annie Yeamons), Amelia Marshall (Jennie Yeamons and Newsgirl), and Christine Ebersole (Gerta Granville).

Frank Rich of The New York Times found the show dull and "aimless", and so did audiences, as it closed after 25 previews and four regular performances.

== Awards and nominations ==
=== Original Broadway production ===
Year	Award	Category	Nominee	Result
1985	Tony Award	Best Book of a Musical	Michael Stewart	Nominated
1985	Drama Desk Award	Outstanding Actor in a Musical	Mark Hamill	Nominated
1985	Drama Desk Award	Outstanding Actor in a Musical	Harry Groener	Nominated
