= Mystic Warriors (Mystic Eye Games) =

Mystic Warriors is a 2001 role-playing game supplement published by Mystic Eye Games.

== Contents ==
Mystic Warriors is a supplement in which twenty unique Mystic Warrior schools are introduced—prestige classes rooted in ancient martial traditions and spiritual power—adaptable to any campaign setting within the world of Gothos.

== Reviews ==
- Pyramid
- Asgard #4 (March, 2002)
- Fictional Reality #7

== See also ==
- Librum Equitis Volume I
- Blight Magic
- Necromancer's Legacy: Thee Compleat Librum ov Gar'Udok's Necromantic Artes
