= Dragonstar =

Dragonstar or Dragon Star may refer to:

- Dragonstar (role-playing game), a 2001 role-playing game
- Dragonstar (novel series), a 1980–1989 science-fiction series
- Dragon Star trilogy, a 1991–1993 fantasy novel series
- Dragon Star Varnir, a 2019 role-playing video game
