= The Leather Patch =

- Original language: English
- Written by: Edward Harrigan
- Genre: Comedic play

Premiere
- Date: February 1886 (New York)
- Place: Park Theatre

The Leather Patch is an 1886 comedic play by Edward Harrigan with songs by David Braham. It debuted at Harrigan's Park Theatre in New York City on February 15, 1886, and ran through May.

== Cast ==
- Edward Harrigan as Jeremiah McCarthy
- John Wild as Jefferson Putnam
- Dan Callver as Caroline Hyer
- M.J. Bradley as Airy McCafferty
- James Fox as Linda Corncover
- Harry Fisher as Judge Herman Doebler
- A.C. Moreland as Counselor Delancey Wriggle
- Richard Quilber as Jimmy the Kyd
- Annie Yeamans as Madeline McCarthy
- Amy Lee as Libby O'Dooley
- Nella Wetherill as Mrs. O'Dooley
- Annie Langdon as Nellie Conroy
- Kate Langdon as Jennie Crimmons

== Songs ==
None of the songs composed by Braham for the play turned out to be hits.

- Baxter Avenue
- Denny Grady's Hack
- It Showered Again
- Put on Your Bridal Veil
