= William Harrigan =

American actor

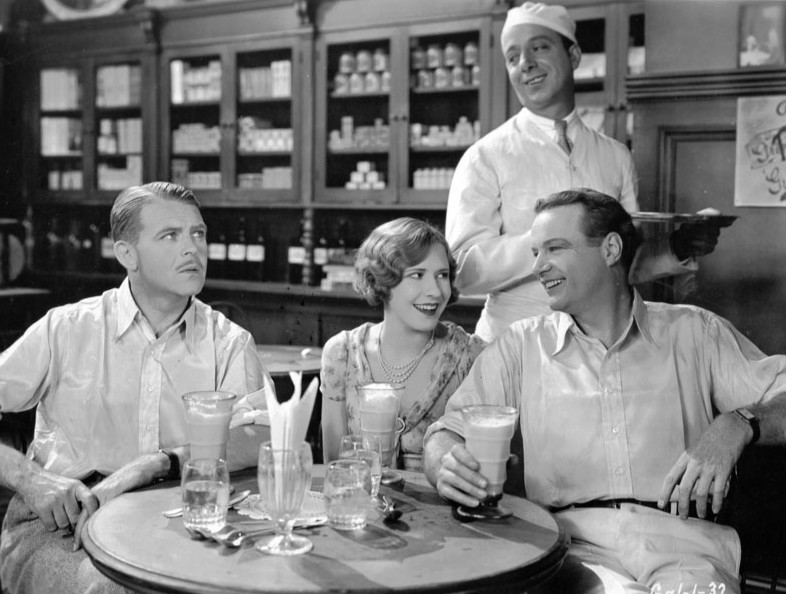
- Still from the film Nix on Dames (1929). At table from left: Robert Ames, Mae Clarke, and Harrigan.
- Born: March 27, 1894
- Died: February 1, 1966, aged 71
- Occupation: Actor
- Father: Edward Harrigan
- Relatives: Nedda Harrigan (sister) Nolan Harrigan (Brother) Philip Harrigan (Brother)

William Harrigan (March 27, 1894 – February 1, 1966) was an American actor who performed in Hollywood during the 1930s and 1940s and on stage.

== Early years ==
Harrigan was born in New York City and attended New York Military Academy. Harrigan was the son of actor Edward Harrigan and the grandson of composer David Braham. His sister was Nedda Harrigan, which made him the brother-in-law of director/playwright Joshua Logan. Harrigan's family were one of the oldest acting families known: they had appeared on the stage uninterrupted since 1660.

Harrigan first performed on stage when he was 5 years old, joining his father in a production of Reilly and the 400 at the Garrick Theater.

During World War I, Harrigan was a captain in the 307th Infantry Regiment of the 77th Division.

== Career ==
Following his years attending New York Military Academy, Harrigan acted in New York theaters in plays that included Bought and Paid For and Springtime. He also toured Australia in 1915 as part of a company led by Charles Millward.

Harrigan's Broadway debut was in Old Lavender (1906). He also performed with his father in a touring company of Old Lavender. In 1933 he played detective Charlie Chan in a Broadway adaptation of novel Keeper of the Keys. He created the role of the captain in the Broadway hit Mister Roberts, which his brother-in-law Joshua Logan co-wrote and directed. Harrigan played the role through the entire 3 year run of the show, with 1158 performances, as well as appearing in the 1956 revival.

His film debut came in 1917. Films in which he appeared included Born Reckless, Cabaret, The Invisible Man, and Nix on Dames. Harrigan performed in vaudeville, including a 1927 performance of Irish ballads at the Palace Theater. In 1929 he was the leading man for the summer stock at Denver's Elitch Theatre.

== Personal life and death ==
Harrigan was married to, and divorced from, Dorothy Langdon and Louise Groody. At the time of his death he was married to Grace Culbert. He died on February 1, 1966, in New York City, aged 71 following a surgery at St. Luke's Hospital.

== Partial filmography ==
- An Affair of Three Nations (1915) - Phillip Warwick
- Cabaret (1927) - Jack Costigan
- Nix on Dames (1927) - Johnny Brown
- Born Reckless (1930) - Good News Brophy
- On the Level (1930) - Danny Madden
- Men on Call (1930) - Cap
- Pick-Up (1933) - Jim Richards
- The Girl in 419 (1933) - Peter Lawton
- Disgraced! (1933) - Captain Holloway
- The Invisible Man (1933) - Dr. Arthur Kemp
- G Men (1935) - 'Mac' McKay
- The People's Enemy (1935) - Henchman (uncredited)
- Stranded (1935) - Updyke
- Silk Hat Kid (1935) - Brother Joe Campbell
- His Family Tree (1935) - Charles Murfree - aka Murphy
- The Melody Lingers On (1935) - Captain Jonesy
- Whipsaw (1935) - 'Doc' Evans
- Frankie and Johnny (1936) - Curley
- Over the Goal (1937) - Jim Shelly
- Federal Bullets (1937) - Federal Agency Chief
- Exiled to Shanghai (1937) - Grant Powell
- Hawaii Calls (1938) - Blake
- Back Door to Heaven (1939) - Frankie's Father
- Arizona (1940) - Union Commanding Officer (uncredited)
- Follies Girl (1943) - Jimmy Dobson
- The Farmer's Daughter (1947) - Ward C. Hughes
- Citizen Saint (1947) - Father Vail
- Desert Fury (1947) - Judge Berle Lindquist
- Flying Leathernecks (1951) - Dr. Lt.Cdr. Joe Curran
- Steel Town (1952) - John 'Mac' McNamara
- Francis Covers the Big Town (1953) - Deputy Chief Inspector Hansen
- Roogie's Bump (1954) - Red O'Malley
- Street of Sinners (1957) - Gus

== Sources ==
- moviefone
