= Tin Woodman (novel) =

1979 novel by Dannis Russell Bailey and David Bischoff

- First edition hardback cover
- Author: David Bischoff and Dennis Russell Bailey
- Cover artist: Gary Monteferante and Judith Turner
- Language: English
- Genre: Science fiction
- Publisher: Doubleday
- Publication date: 1 April 1979
- Publication place: United States
- Media type: Print (Hardcover)
- Pages: 182
- ISBN: 0-385-12785-5

Tin Woodman is a science fiction novel written by Dennis Russell Bailey and David Bischoff. It was first published in 1979. The story, about a psychic who makes contact with a sentient spacecraft, was adapted into the Tin Man episode of Star Trek: The Next Generation.

== Plot summary ==
A young psychic boy is taken aboard a starship at the request of the government. The boy is considered both a misfit and dangerous because he has the ability to read minds on earth. However, once aboard he travels into deep space where he comes into contact with a sentient starship. The mission of the crew is to communicate with the alien craft and bring it back to earth. However, things don't go according to plan when the young psychic makes contact and decides to take matters into his own hands.

=== Publication history ===
- 1979, USA, Doubleday ISBN 0-385-12785-5, Pub date 1 April 1979, Hardback
- 1980, UK, Sidgwick & Jackson, ISBN 0-283-98602-6, Pub date 1980, Hardback
- 1980, UK, Readers Union/The Science Fiction Book Club [UK], Pub date 1980, Hardback
- 1982, USA, Ace Books, ISBN 0-441-81292-9, Pub date, Feb 1982, Paperback
- 1982, UK, Sidgwick & Jackson, ISBN 0-283-98813-4, Pub date 1980, Omnibus Hardback
- 1983 France, Les Enfants du Voyage, Opta (OPTA - Galaxie Bis #96), ISBN 2-7201-0182-6, Cover: J. L. Verdier, 206pp, Pub date Dec 1983, Paperback
- 1985, USA, Ace Books, ISBN 0-441-81293-7, Cover: Walter Velez, Pub date, Dec. 1985, Paperback

=== Explanation of the novel's title ===
The name Tin Woodman is derived from The Wonderful Wizard of Oz Tin Woodman character. The name is used as a euphemism for the alien, the subject of the novel, who like the Woodman seeks happiness by having its heart restored. Unfortunately, it cannot get a heart by itself and must kill to get one.

== Adaptations ==
Bischoff and Bailey based this novel on their short story of the same name, which was nominated for a Nebula Award in 1977.

This book was adapted into a Star Trek: The Next Generation episode, "Tin Man", also written by Bischoff & Bailey. The core story comes from the novel, but the novel itself was not associated with the Star Trek universe. Many changes had to be made to adapt the story into the Star Trek universe, such as the characterization of the crew, and the book's ending.
