= Mark Hart (actor) =

American musical theatre actor (1873–1950)

Mark Hart (c. 1873, Worcester, Massachusetts – November 25, 1950, Worcester) was an American actor who had a five-decade long career on the American stage.

== Life and career ==
Born in Worcester, Mark Hart was the nephew of actor Tony Hart. While a teenager he began his career performing with his uncle and the actor Edward Harrigan in their well known vaudeville act Harrigan & Hart. He made his Broadway debut in 1905 portraying the conniving politician Pat McCann in the Jean Schwartz and William Jerome musical Fritz in Tammany Hall. He portrayed another politician, Sam Grady, in Joseph E. Howard's 1906 Broadway musical The District Leader at Wallack's Theatre. He returned to Broadway in 1912 as Sarsfield O'Brien in The Girl from Brighton at the Academy of Music.

Hart served a term as vice president of The Lambs. He also served as an officer of the Actors' Equity Association and was a member of the White Rats of America. He died at the age of 77 on November 25, 1950, in Worcester, Massachusetts.

== Bibliography ==
- Dietz, Dan (2022). The Complete Book of 1900s Broadway Musicals. Rowman & Littlefield Publishers. ISBN 9781538168943.
- Mantle, Burns; Sherwood, Garrison P.; Chapman, John Arthur (1933). "The Girl from Brighton". The Best Plays of 1909-1919. Dodd, Mead & Co.
