= Sam Rickey =

Sam Rickey (born Richard Thomas Higgins) (March 16, 1848-September 10, 1885) was an American comedic actor.

Rickey was an early partner of Edward Harrigan before Harrigan joined with Tony Hart, and it is for this partnership that he is best known. The two performed together in San Francisco, moved eastward to Chicago, and had their Broadway debut together in November 1870 in a sketch called The Little Fraud.

Rickey was known for playing Northern Irish characters, and also played blackface roles early in his career. Rickey's "overmastering desire for liquor" was his downfall, leading to his death in New York at age 37 in September 1885.

Rickey also served as a drummer in the Rhode Island infantry in the American Civil War.
