= Theatre Comique =

Former theatre in Manhattan, New York

Coordinates: 40.722561°N 73.999023°W

- Interactive map of the Theatre Comique area

General information
- Location: Manhattan, New York City
- Opened: 1862
- Demolished: 1881

The Theatre Comique, formerly Wood's Minstrel Hall, was a venue on Broadway in Manhattan, New York City. It was built in 1862, replacing a synagogue on the site.

== History ==
William Lingard debuted at the theater in 1868. Pluto, the first Broadway musical to feature music by David Braham, debuted at the venue in 1869. In 1871, Josh Hart, who had formerly managed the Howard Athenaeum in Boston, took over and made the renamed Theatre Comique a variety house, vying with Tony Pastor to secure the best artists and the biggest popular theater audience in New York. Ned Harrigan and Tony Hart began a run at the theater in 1872, with Harrigan taking over from Hart as manager in the fall of 1876. Harrigan moved on to a New Theatre Comique further up Broadway and the old building was demolished in 1881.
