= Dragonstar (novel series) =

Series of science fiction novels by David Bischoff and Thomas F. Monteleone

The Dragonstar novels are a science fiction series by American writers David Bischoff and Thomas F. Monteleone, which focuses on a race of evolved dinosaurs with spacefaring technology. The individual books in the series are Dragonstar (1981, serial), Day of the Dragonstar (1983), Night of the Dragonstar (1985), and Dragonstar Destiny (1989). Aside from the appearance of Reptilian humanoids, the Dragonstar novels do not have any link to the more recent roleplaying game system Dragonstar.
