= Yeaman =

Yeaman is a surname. Notable people with the surname include:

- Barbara Yeaman (1924–2025), American conservationist
- George H. Yeaman (1829–1908), American politician and diplomat from Kentucky
- Ian Yeaman (1889–1977), English solicitor
- James Yeaman (1816–1886), Scottish Liberal Party politician
- Kirk Yeaman (born 1983), English rugby player

== See also ==
- Yeaman (hill), a categorisation of British hills

== See also ==
- Yeamans
