= Tony Hart (theater) =

American actor and singer

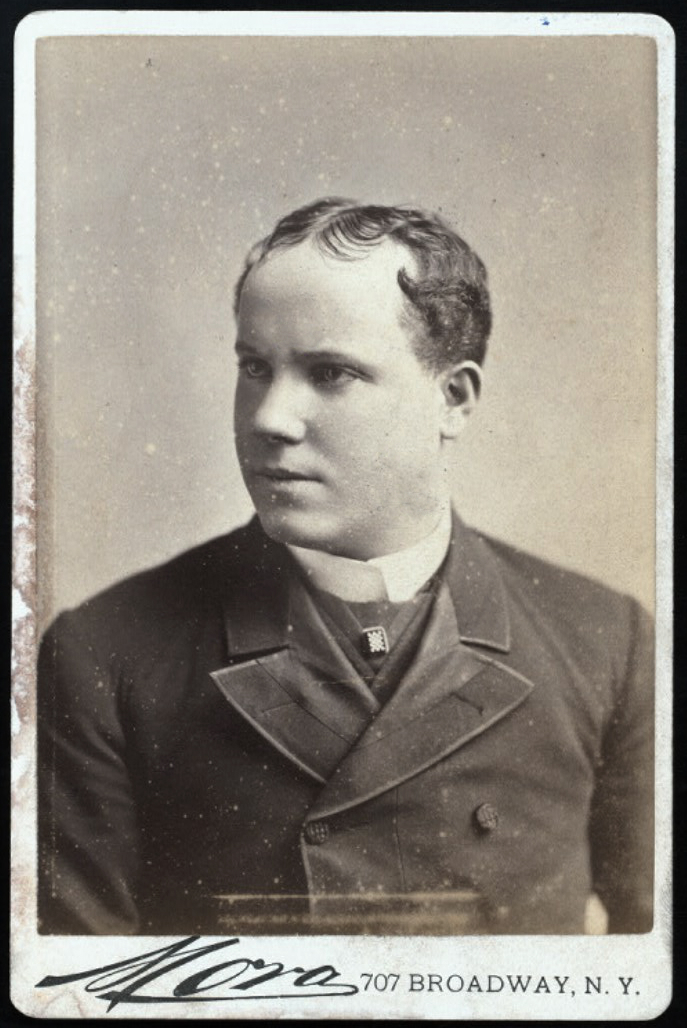
Undated cabinet card portrait of Hart

Tony Hart (born Anthony J. Cannon; July 25, 1855 – November 4, 1891) was an American actor, comedian and singer. He is best known for working with Edward Harrigan in the late 19th century comedy team of Harrigan & Hart.

He met Harrigan in 1870. The two became a fixture at the Theatre Comique in New York City by the mid-1870s performing in Harrigan's farcical sketches. The slight and short Hart usually portrayed the female roles in their comic sketches and plays.

Their breakthrough hit was the 1873 song and sketch "The Mulligan Guard", a lampoon of an Irish neighborhood "militia" with music by David Braham. It became their signature piece, and they featured it in many of their slapstick skits and plays. The team's last Broadway performance was in May 1885. Hart's health and financial condition both deteriorated, and he died at the age of 36.

== Early life and career ==
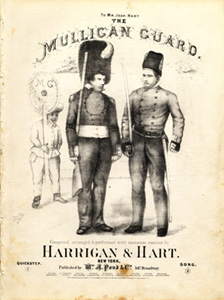

Hart was born in Worcester, Massachusetts, and began his career in Boston. He met Harrigan in Chicago in 1870 and soon changed his name to Tony Hart. Harrigan and Hart went in 1871 to Boston, where they had their first big success at John Stetson's Howard Athenaeum. They then moved on to New York, where they first worked with Tony Pastor before beginning a long run at Josh Hart's Theatre Comique. By the mid-1870s they began moving from the variety show toward musical theatre. Harrigan's sketches on the Comique's crowded bill featured comic Irish, German and black characters drawn from everyday life on the streets of New York. The slight and short Hart usually portrayed the female roles in their comic sketches and plays. They began moving from the variety show toward musical theatre.

== The Mulligan Guard ==
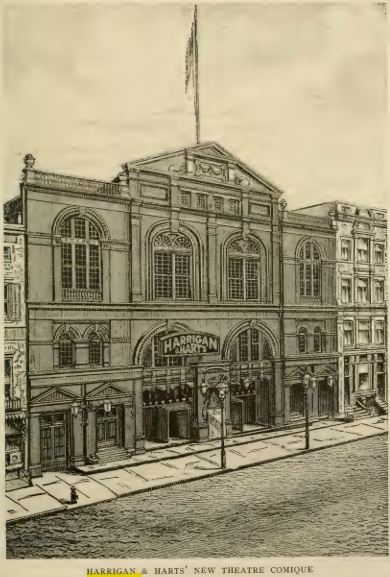
New Theatre Comique

Their breakthrough hit was the 1873 song and sketch "The Mulligan Guard", a lampoon of an Irish neighborhood "militia" with music by David Braham, who would become their musical director and Harrigan's father in law. It became their signature piece, and they featured it in many of their slapstick skits and plays. In 1876, Harrigan took over the Comique himself, along with Hart and manager Martin Hanley.

By 1878, with The Mulligan Guard Picnic, Harrigan & Hart settled down on Broadway and performed in seventeen of their shows over the next seven years. Their most popular musical was the Mulligan Guard's Ball (1880). Though still broad and farcical, full of chaos and hilarity, these shows integrated music with a more literary story line, together with dance, and they began to resemble modern musical comedy. Harrigan wrote the stories and lyrics, and Braham wrote the music. The action of the plays took place in downtown Manhattan and concerned real-life problems, such as interracial tensions, political corruption, and gang violence, all mixed with broad, street-smart comedy, puns and ethnic dialects. Harrigan played the politically ambitious Irish saloon owner "Dan Mulligan", and Hart played the African-American washerwoman "Rebecca Allup" in blackface.

Although the Theatre Comique was eventually shut down for financial reasons, Harrigan and Hart announced in 1881 that they would build a fresh and elegant "New Theatre Comique" several blocks further north on Broadway. The building they renovated was originally the home of the Church of the Messiah but had hosted many other theatres throughout the years. However, this theatre was not to last; it burned to the ground in 1884. After the theatre collapsed, so did the partnership. Harrigan's habit of hiring relatives soured his partnership with Hart. In May 1885, five months after the fire, Harrigan and Hart appeared on Broadway together for the last time.

== Later years ==
Hart and his wife, Gertie Granville, went on to appear in other productions, but he never achieved the popularity that he had enjoyed with Harrigan. Diagnosed with paresis, as the mental symptoms of tertiary syphilis were then known, his financial condition declined along with his health. His friends and fans mounted a benefit production, on March 22, 1888, to raise funds for his living expenses and medical treatment. He developed dementia and spent most of his last years in a state mental institution.

He died in Worcester, Massachusetts, at the age of 36 from complications of advanced syphilis. He is buried in St. John's Cemetery in Worcester. His nephew was actor Mark Hart.

== Harrigan 'n Hart ==
In 1985, a musical celebrating the rise of the partnership, Harrigan 'N Hart, opened on Broadway. The show has a book by Michael Stewart, lyrics by Peter Walker, and music by Max Showalter is based on the book The Merry Partners by Ely Jacques Kahn, Jr. and material found by Nedda Harrigan Logan. Harry Groener portrayed Harrigan, Mark Hamill (of Star Wars fame) played Hart, Christine Ebersole was Gertie, and Joe Layton directed. Frank Rich of The New York Times found the show dull and "aimless", and so did audiences, as it closed after 25 previews and four regular performances.
