= St. Barnabas Hospital (Bronx) =

- St Barnabas Health System
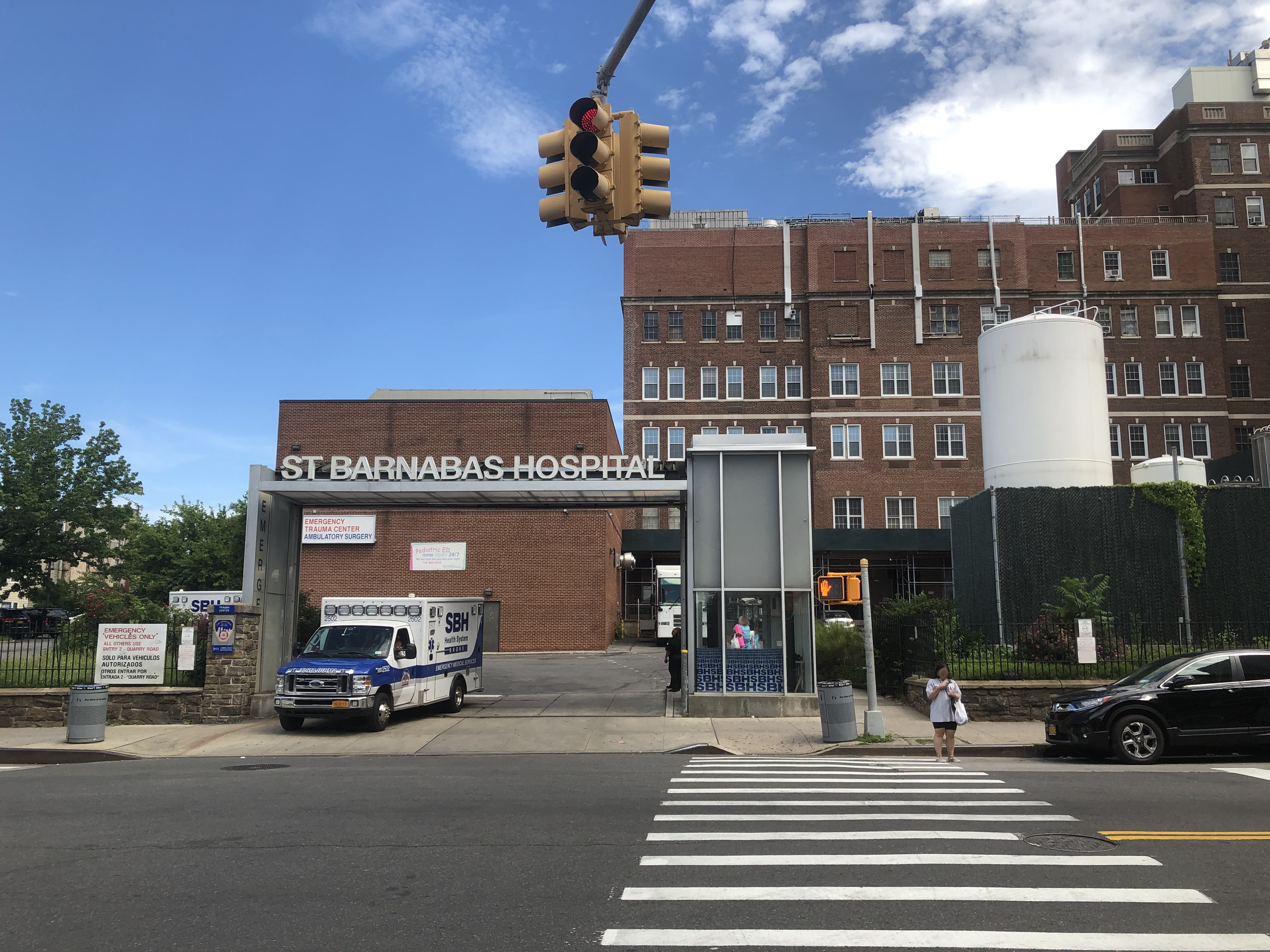

Geography
- Location: 4422 Third Ave, The Bronx, New York, United States
- Coordinates: 40.852110°N 73.891456°W

Organization
- Care system: Private
- Type: Teaching
- Affiliated university: CUNY School of Medicine, New York Institute of Technology College of Osteopathic Medicine

Services
- Emergency department: Level II trauma center
- Beds: 422
- Speciality: Teaching

History
- Former name: The Home for the Incurables (1866)
- Opened: 1866; 160 years ago

Links
- Website: sbhny.org/st-barnabas-hospital/
- Lists: Hospitals in New York State
- Other links: Hospitals in The Bronx

St. Barnabas Hospital is a non-profit teaching hospital founded in 1866. The hospital is located in the Belmont neighborhood of The Bronx in New York City. It is a Level II Trauma Center and is a major clinical affiliate for clinical clerkship of the New York Institute of Technology College of Osteopathic Medicine.

== History ==
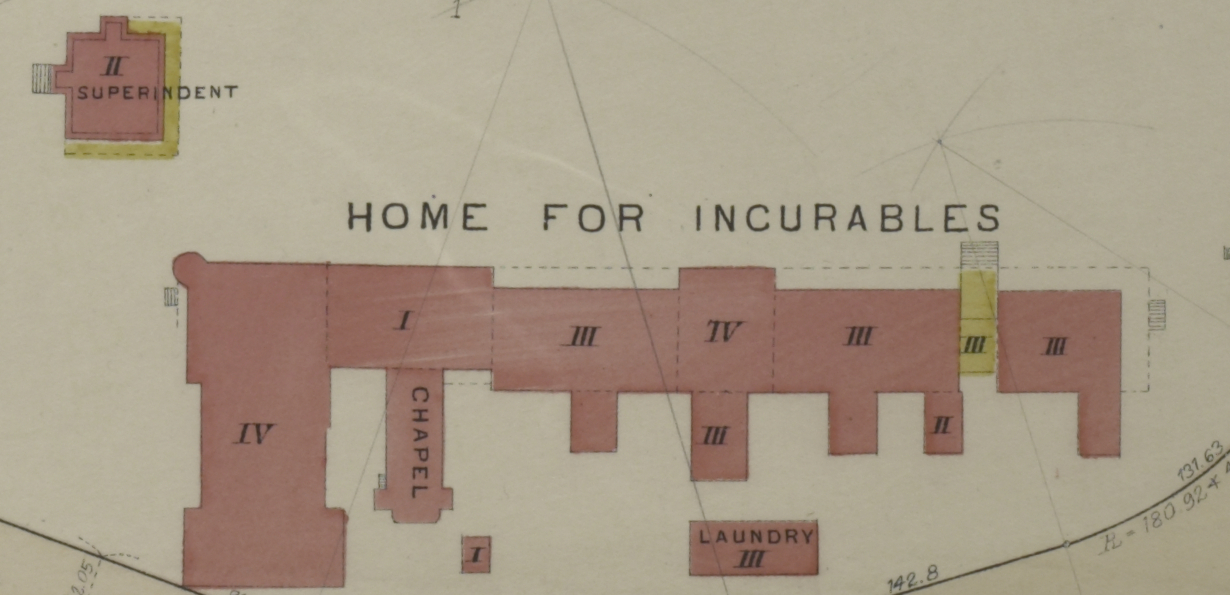
1901 "Home for Incurables" map, from the Atlas of the Borough of the Bronx, City of New York.

St. Barnabas Hospital, originally known as the Home for the Incurables, was founded in 1866 by Reverend Washington Rodman of the Grace Episcopal Church in West Farms, Bronx. The hospital became the first chronic disease hospital, was housed in a modest frame house, and could serve 33 patients. The hospital moved to its present location on Third Avenue in 1874 and by 1911 could accommodate 300 beds. Support for the non-profit hospital came from New York Society including Cornelius Vanderbilt (who served on the hospital's Board of Managers), John Jacob Astor, Theodore Roosevelt, and Frederick Law Olmsted. Between 1926 and 1931, the hospital added three new buildings. In 1947, the hospital changed its name to St. Barnabas Hospital. In 1969, St. Barnabas broke ground for a six-story West Wing with 188 beds, a cafeteria, and kitchen. St. Barnabas Nursing Home was founded in 1972, and is located on the hospital's campus at 2175 Quarry Rd.

In 1983, Dr. Ronald Gade was promoted from head of radiology to be the hospital's president. He worked to implement more efficient patient care by reducing staff size, discouraging long hospital stays, and increasing income from Medicaid. His implementations at St. Barnabas challenged the medical establishment by creating a managed-care revolution in American medicine. By the late 1990s, the hospital won two city contracts worth almost $450 million, one to provide doctors for Lincoln Hospital in the South Bronx, the other to care for prisoners on Rikers Island. Also in the 1990s, the hospital received state designation as a Level 2 Trauma Center and created an AIDS Center and Stroke Center.

The hospital is a major clinical teaching site for the New York College of Osteopathic Medicine. In 2016, the hospital also became an affiliate of CUNY School of Medicine to recruit underrepresented minorities into medicine, increase medical care in underserved communities, and boost the number of primary care physicians.

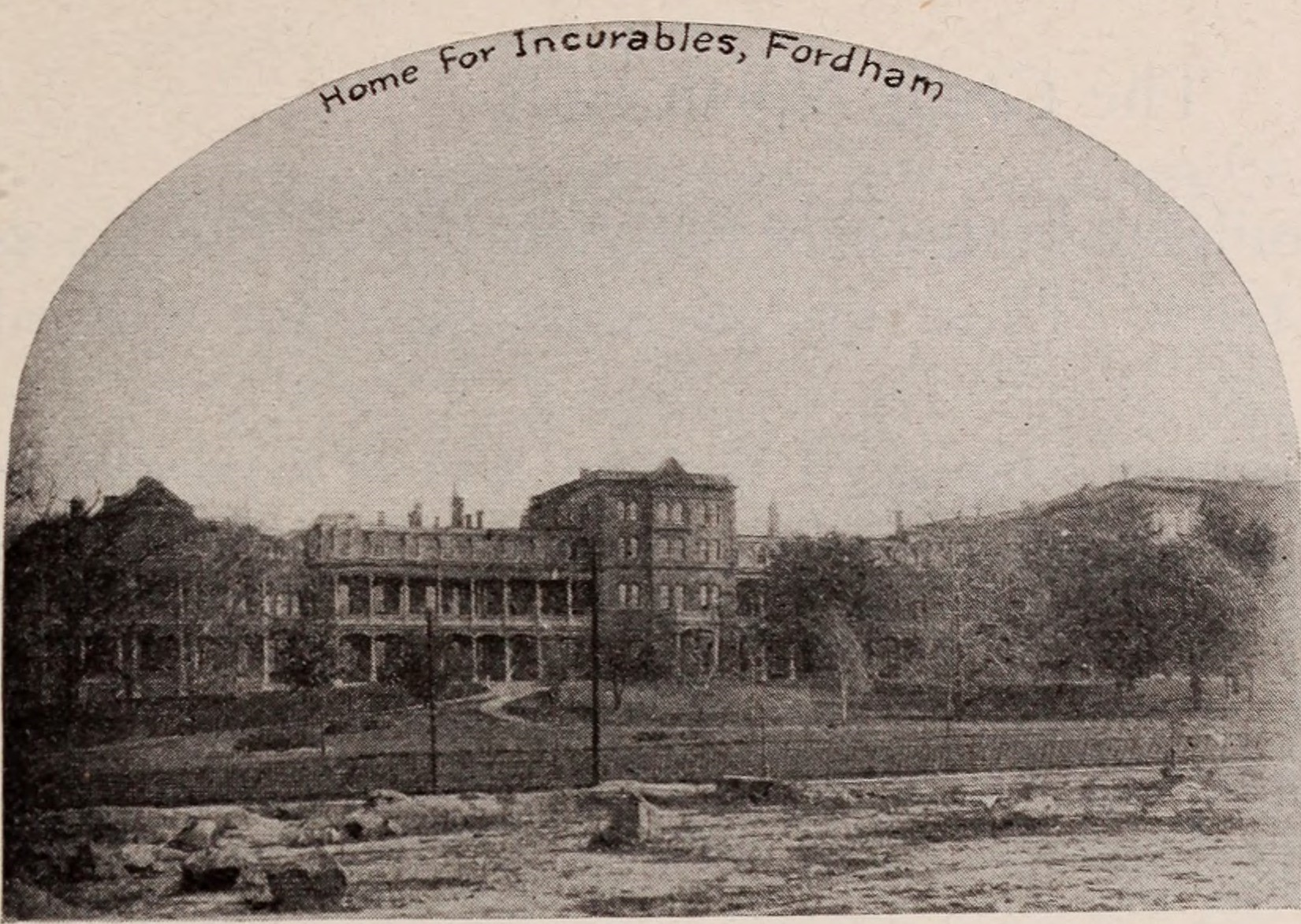
Home for the Incurables, Fordham, Bronx

== Notable personnel ==
- Dr. Irving S. Cooper – Developed cryothalamectomy as a surgical technique for primary control of tremor in patients with Parkinson's disease during his employment (1954–1977).
- Dr. Humayun Chaudhry - Completed residency at St. Barnabas. Became Commissioner of Health Services for Suffolk County, New York. He later became CEO of the Federation of State Medical Boards.
- Dr. Richard F. Daines – Served as Senior Vice President for Professional Affairs and Medical Director. After leaving St. Barnabas Hospital, he became the president of St. Luke's-Roosevelt Hospital Center (now Mount Sinai Morningside) in Manhattan. Later, he became the New York State Health Commissioner.
- Victor M. Pichardo – Vice President for Community and Government Affairs. He was previously a New York State Assembly member.

== Deaths of notable people ==
- Bryant Baker (1881–1970) sculptor
- Emanuel Balaban (1895–1973) pianist
- Reginald Bathurst Birch (1856–1943) illustrator
- Benjamin Feigenbaum (1860 – 1932) Yiddish socialist, newspaper editor, translator, and satirist
- Lesandro “Junior” Guzman-Feliz (2002-2018) victim of gang violence killed on June 20, 2018, by members of the Dominican gang, Trinitario, in the Belmont neighborhood of the Bronx
- The Mighty Hannibal (1939-2014), James Timothy Shaw, R&B, soul and funk singer, songwriter
- Abraham Hirschfeld (1919–2005), real estate investor, Broadway producer
- Electus D. Litchfield (1872–1952) architect
- Annie Mack Berlein (c. 1850 - June 22, 1935) Irish-born American actress
- Gustave Verbeek (1867–1937), cartoonist

== See also ==
- List of hospitals in the Bronx
- Cooperman Barnabas Medical Center
