= Vampires of Nightworld =

Novel by David Bischoff published in 1981

Vampires of Nightworld is a novel by David Bischoff published in 1981.

== Plot summary ==
Vampires of Nightworld is a novel in which a vampire tries to become the master of evil on Nightworld by conquering it.

== Reception ==
Greg Costikyan reviewed Vampires of Nightworld in Ares Magazine #10 and commented that "Vampires of Nightworld is a pleasant fantasy (or SF) novel, head and shoulders – well, head – above most of the miasma that is fantasy being published today."
