= Nix on Dames =

1929 film

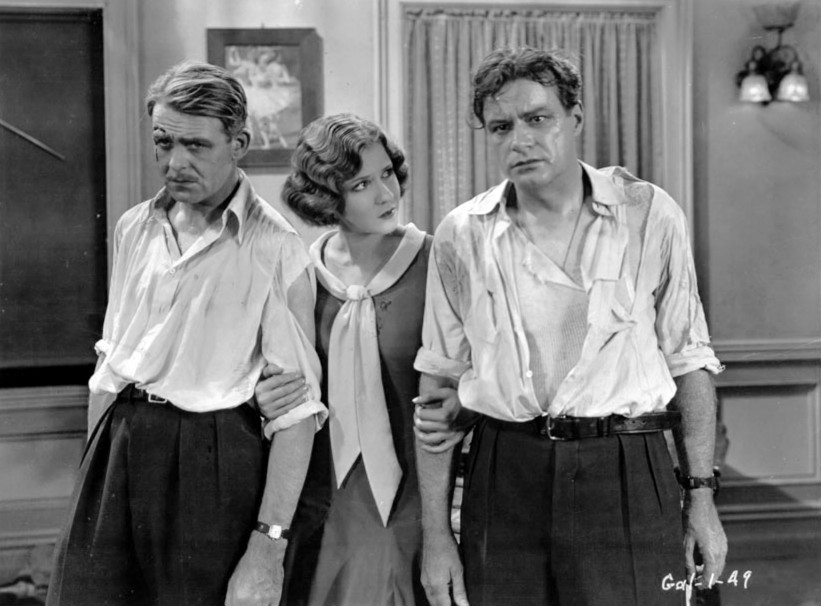
- Directed by: Donald Gallaher
- Screenplay by: Maude Fulton; Frank Gay
- Story by: Maude Fulton
- Produced by: George E. Middleton
- Starring: Mae Clarke; Robert Ames; William Harrigan; Maude Fulton; George MacFarlane; Frederick H. Graham
- Cinematography: Charles G. Clarke
- Edited by: Dorothy Spencer
- Music by: Abel Baer; L. Wolfe Gilbert
- Production company: Fox Film Corporation
- Distributed by: Fox Film Corporation
- Release date: November 24, 1929
- Running time: 67 minutes
- Country: United States
- Language: English

Nix on Dames is a 1929 American sound (All-Talking) pre-Code comedy film directed by Donald Gallaher and written by Maude Fulton and Frank Gay. The film stars Mae Clarke, Robert Ames, William Harrigan, Maude Fulton, George MacFarlane and Frederick H. Graham. The film was released on November 24, 1929, by Fox Film Corporation.

== Cast ==
- Mae Clarke as Jackie Lee
- Robert Ames as Bert Wills
- William Harrigan as Johnny Brown
- Maude Fulton as Stella Foster
- George MacFarlane as Ed Foster
- Frederick H. Graham as Baring
- Camille Rovelle s Miss Woods
- Grace Wallace as Bonnie Tucker
- Hugh McCormack as Jim Tucker
- Ben Hall as Cliff
- Marshall Ruth as Billy
- William Colvin as Hoffman
- Louise Beavers as Magnolia

== Plot ==
Professional acrobats Bert and Johnny are the best of friends. They are also confirmed women-hating bachelors. When an injury suddenly sidelines the act, they move to a boarding house that caters to theater folk until they are ready to return to work. There, they meet one of the residents, Jackie, a girl who wants to also become an acrobat. Both Bert and Johnny fall for her and become rivals for her, eventually splitting up their act.

== See also ==
- List of early sound feature films (1926–1929)
