= Fritz in Tammany Hall =

1905 musical

Fritz in Tammany Hall is a musical in three acts with music by Jean Schwartz, lyrics by William Jerome, and a book by John J. McNally. The musical takes place in 1905 in New York City and on Long Island. It was a political spoof of New York City politics of that period.

== History ==
Fritz in Tammany Hall was the sixth musical created by the Schwartz and Jerome songwriting team. McNally had previously collaborated with Schwartz and Jerome on the musical Lifting the Lid which premiered four months before Fritz in Tammany Hall at Broadway's Aerial Gardens on June 5, 1905. Fritz in Tammany Hall premiered on October 16, 1905, at Broadway's Herald Square Theatre. The show ran for a total of 43 performances; closing on November 18, 1905. The musical was produced by Klaw and Erlanger, co-directed and choreographed by Herbert Gresham and Ned Wayburn, and used sets by Frank Platzer and Meixner. F. Richard Anderson designed the costumes and Anton Heindl served as music director.

Like the prior Lifting the Lid, Fritz in Tammany Hall was a satire of New York City politics. The plot centered around a German immigrant, the baker Fritz von Swobenfritz, who unexpectedly in elected to the New York City Board of Aldermen and is thrust into the politics surrounding Tammany Hall. The role of Swobenfritz was a re-creation of a character made famous on the American stage by the actor J. K. Emmet (1841–1891) during the 19th century. This re-created version of that character was made as a starring vehicle for comedian Joseph Cawthorn.

Stella Mayhew achieved particular success in this production as the Irish widow Mrs. Hart-Judson singing the hit song "I'm a Woman of Importance"; a recording of which is included in the CD anthology Music of the New York Stage. The show's other successful tune, "East Side Lil", was performed by Ada Lewis in the role of Lil McGrain. Others in the cast included Julius Tannen as J. Edward Corley, Alison Skipworth as Elena McCann, and Mark Hart as Pat McCann among others.

== Plot ==
District leader Pat McCann is concerned about the outcome of an upcoming election, and implements a strategy to split the district vote by nominating the non-political German baker Fritz von Swobenfritz for New York alderman. To everyone's surprise, including Swobenfritz and McCann, Swobenfritz wins.
