= Annie Mack =

Irish-born American stage actress (1850-1935)

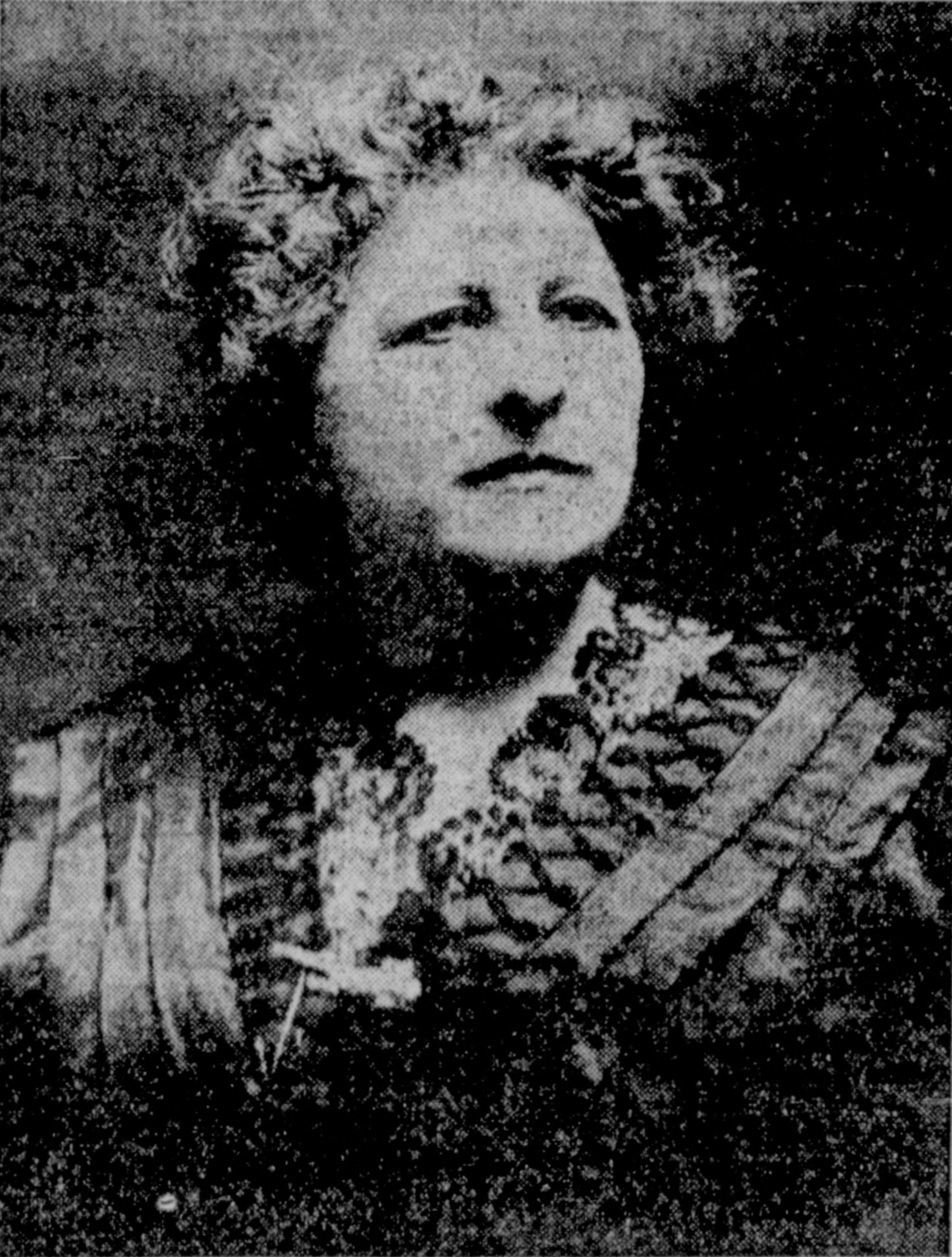
Annie Mack Berlein

Annie Mack Berlein (c. 1850 - June 22, 1935) was an Irish-born American actress.

She appeared in productions opposite leading actors of her day including Edwin Booth and Joseph Jefferson (for three years in his run as Rip Van Winkle), and also appeared in a number of Harrigan and Hart productions where she played the leading female role. She retired from the stage in 1928 after fifty-five years of acting.

She was married to actor Edward J. Mack. Berlein was her maiden name but it was added to later stage appearances. She died in New York at the Home for Incurables in June 1935, survived by a daughter and grandson.
