= Emanuel Balaban =

American pianist and conductor

External audio
- You may hear recordings by Emanuel Balaban collaborating with various soloists and orchestras in the 1920s and 1940s Here on archive.org

Emanuel Balaban (January 27, 1895 – April 17, 1973) was a pianist and free-lance conductor who taught at the Eastman School of Music and later at the Juilliard School.

Balaban was born to Joseph Balaban and Olga Ribman Balaban in Brooklyn, New York. He attended the Institute of Musical Art, then studied under Fritz Busch in Germany. Although a pianist (he was accompanist to Efrem Zimbalist, Mischa Elman and Erica Morini), conducting was his goal. He was a conductor at the Dresden State Opera and led orchestras in Berlin, Leipzig, Dresden, New York, and Washington D.C.

From 1929 through 1944 he was Director of the Opera Department at the Eastman School of Music. In 1945 he conducted a Naumburg Orchestral Concert, in the Naumburg Bandshell, Central Park. In 1947 he joined the faculty of the Juilliard School, a position he held until his death. From 1953 to 1956 he was on the faculty of the Berkshire Music Center.

He recorded two operas composed by Gian Carlo Menotti, The Medium and The Telephone.

Balaban died at St. Barnabas Hospital in New York City. He was married to Priscilla Brown who survived him, as did his siblings Edward Balaban and Stella Appelbaum.
