= Dorothy Spencer =

American film editor (1909–2002)

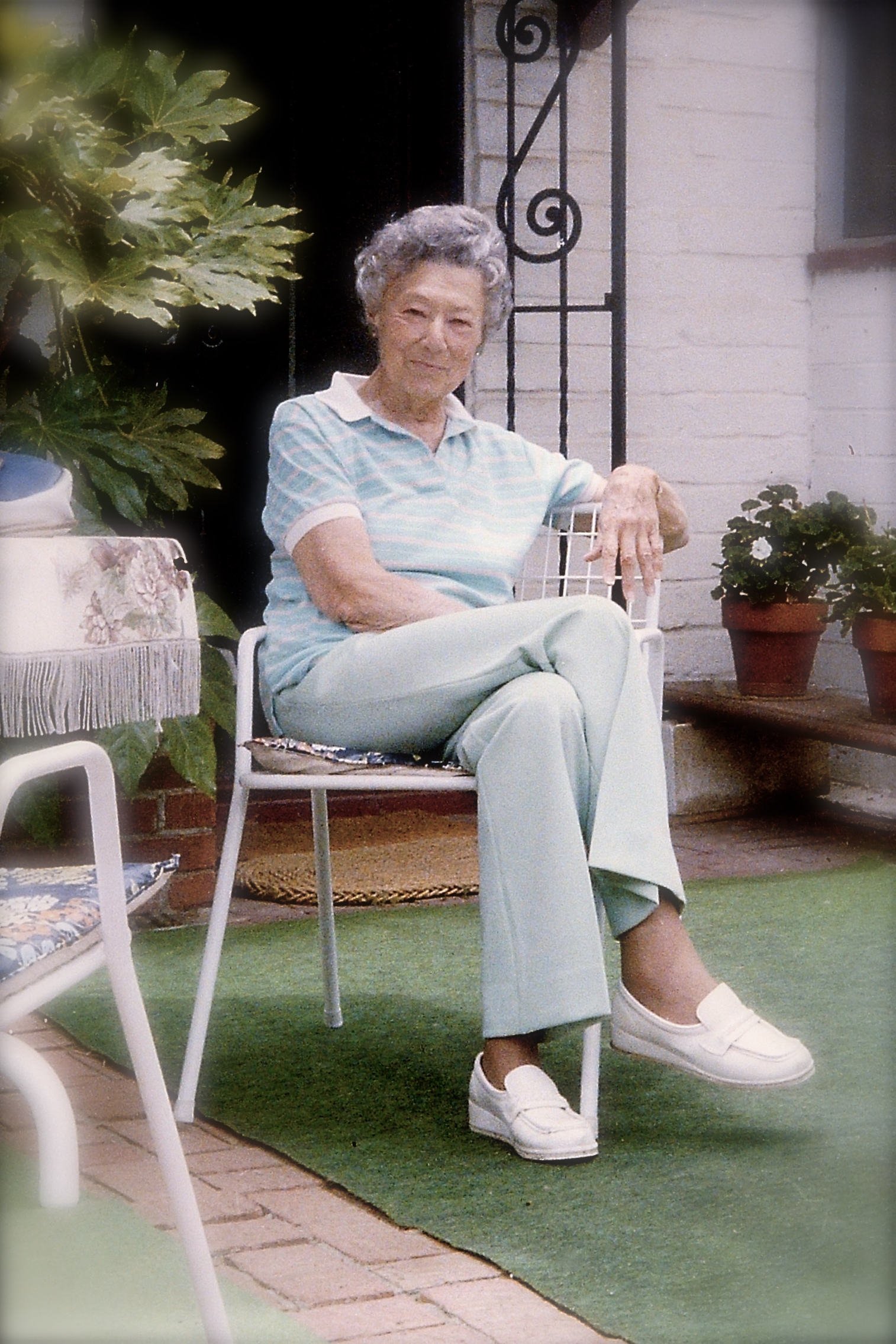
- Spencer, June 1985
- Born: February 3, 1909; Covington, Kentucky, U.S.
- Died: May 23, 2002 (aged 93); Encinitas, California, U.S.
- Occupation: Film editor
- Years active: 1926–1979
- Family: Jeanne Spencer (sister)

Dorothy Spencer (February 3, 1909 – May 23, 2002), known as Dot Spencer, was an American film editor with 75 feature film credits from a career that spanned more than 50 years. Nominated for the Academy Award for Best Film Editing on four occasions, Spencer is remembered for editing three of John Ford's best known films, including Stagecoach (1939) and My Darling Clementine (1946).

== Career ==
Dorothy Spencer was born in Covington, Kentucky in 1909 to Charles Spencer and Catherine (née Spellbrink). She was the youngest of four children, which included her older sister Jeanne. When she was a child, her family relocated to Los Angeles, where Jeanne evidently became a film editor. In 1924, at the age of 15, Dorothy joined Consolidated-Aller Lab as an uncredited assistant editor on several films directed by Raoul Walsh and The Strong Man (1926) and Long Pants (1927), both directed by Frank Capra. In 1929, she joined Twentieth Century-Fox as an editor. Her first credits were Married in Hollywood and Nix on Dames (both released in 1929).

By the 1930s, Spencer worked freelance on several films distributed by Paramount and Universal Pictures. She next teamed with Otho Lovering, in which they shared editing credits on several United Artists films, including The Case Against Mrs. Ames (1936) and Winter Carnival (1939). Several of these films were directed by Tay Garnett and produced by Walter Wanger, including Stand-In (1937), Trade Winds (1938), and Eternally Yours (1939).

=== 1939: Stagecoach ===
In 1939, Spencer and Lovering co-edited John Ford's seminal Western Stagecoach. They have been retrospectively praised for the Apache attack on the stagecoach and the ensuing chase across the desert terrain. Most notably, both had broken the 180-degree rule in film editing, with the intention to "disorient, confuse, and heighten anxiety for viewers, and by achieving this, the scene achieved a couple of intriguing results." In this way, the audience is drawn closer to "the characters in the stagecoach, who are themselves thoroughly disoriented and confused."

In 1974, Spencer reflected that Ford had allowed them much editorial freedom: "With most directors, you cut it exactly the way they want it, and there's no room for editorial creativity [...] Ford never told me anything and he never looked at the picture until it was finished." They received an Academy Award nomination for Best Film Editing.

=== 1943–1967: Editor at Twentieth Century-Fox ===
By the 1940s, Spencer collaborated with several notable film directors, including Ernst Lubitsch for To Be or Not to Be (1942) and concluding with his last posthumous credit That Lady in Ermine (1948). In 1943, Spencer rejoined Twentieth Century-Fox as a hired staff editor. There, she edited Alfred Hitchcock's Lifeboat (1944). Spencer next edited Elia Kazan's directorial film debut, A Tree Grows in Brooklyn (1945). She also edited John Ford's My Darling Clementine (1946) with its notable depiction of the gunfight at the O.K. Corral. It has been noted that in "its editing, a tight, pared-down construction in which only the barest (and most pertinent) of information is conveyed."

Spencer collaborated with Anatole Litvak with The Snake Pit (1948) and was followed by Decision Before Dawn (1951), which earned her second Oscar nomination. The success of the film began Spencer's association with historical spectacles and action films. She once reflected, "For some reason I always seem to get assigned to pictures that are very physical. I don't know why."

==== 1962–1963: Cleopatra ====
Spencer was handed the "most difficult task" of her career when she edited Joseph L. Mankiewicz's Cleopatra (1963). Initially budgeted at $2 million (equivalent to $21,766,029 in 2025), the production was plagued by cost overruns and casting changes. Mankiewicz was hired to replace Rouben Mamoulian, who had been the film's initial director, after the production had spent $5 million (equivalent to $54,415,073 in 2025). Dissatisfied with the earlier scripts, Mankiewicz had written an incomplete shooting script and rewrote the script by longhand as filming proceeded.

When principal photography was completed, Mankiewicz had shot 120 miles (630,000 ft) of footage. By October 1962, Mankiewicz had screened a five-and-a-half hour rough cut to Darryl F. Zanuck in Paris. Undeterred by the film's length, Mankiewicz had envisioned releasing Cleopatra in two parts: the first installment titled Caesar and Cleopatra and the second Antony and Cleopatra. Zanuck disagreed with Mankiewicz's vision as the studio aimed to publicize the onscreen pairing of Elizabeth Taylor and Richard Burton. He hired editor Elmo Williams to write a detailed analysis of the rough cut, in which Zanuck delivered a written response considering the battle sequences amateurish and unconvincing. Mankiewicz replied back in a letter sent days later, defending himself as he and Spencer had prepared a "rough cut" of the film and planned to discuss the final editing.

As plans for another meeting were rebuffed, Mankiewicz learned that Zanuck and Williams had gone to Spencer's hotel to discuss the footage he and Spencer had removed. Mankiewicz tried to arrange to view the cut himself but was told it would be unavailable to him. Two weeks had passed since the rough-cut screening, and Mankiewicz sent a three-page letter to Zanuck demanding where he stood in relation to the film. Zanuck replied in a nine-page letter, blaming him for the film's cost overruns and fired him upon the completion of the dubbing. Months later, Zanuck rehired Mankiewicz to reshoot two key battle sequences in Almería, Spain.

At Zanuck's request, Spencer reedited the film down to four hours for the premiere. However, to maximize the number of showings per day in each theatre, Cleopatra had its runtime truncated to slightly over three hours for first-run engagements. A year later, in 1964, Cleopatra garnered nine Oscar nominations at the Academy Awards, including Spencer's third nomination for Best Film Editing.

=== 1965–1979: Films with Mark Robson and retirement ===
Spencer collaborated with Mark Robson on several of his films, including Von Ryan's Express (1965) and Valley of the Dolls (1967). Spencer then edited the disaster film Earthquake (1974), her eight collaboration with Robson. In an article for American Cinematographer magazine, Spencer wrote: "[Robson and I] have a very nice relationship and I like working with him. Although he is a top‑notch editor himself, he gives me free rein to exercise my own creative individuality in cutting a sequence the way I feel it should go." She received her fourth and final Academy Award nomination for Best Film Editing. Her last film credit was for The Concorde...Airport '79. She retired to Encinitas, California.

In 1989, Spencer was awarded the American Cinema Editors Career Achievement Award and was among the first four editors to receive the award. In November 2001, Eileen Kowalski of Variety commemorated, "Indeed, many of the editorial greats have been women: Dede Allen, Verna Fields, Thelma Schoonmaker, Anne V. Coates and Dorothy Spencer."

== Death ==
She died on May 23, 2002, at the age of 93. Her death was not widely reported in the press of the time.

== Filmography ==
Year	Film	Director	Notes	Refs
1926	The Strong Man	Frank Capra	Assistant editor	
1927	Long Pants	Frank Capra	Assistant editor	
1928	In Old Arizona	Irving Cummings; Raoul Walsh	Assistant editor	
1929	Four Married Men	Marcel Silver	Assistant editor	
1929	Married in Hollywood	Marcel Silver		
1929	Nix on Dames	Donald Gallaher		
1931	Mamá	Benito Perojo		
1934	Coming Out Party	John G. Blystone	Uncredited	
1934	Such Women Are Dangerous	James Flood	Uncredited	
1934	She Was a Lady	Hamilton MacFadden		
1935	Lottery Lover	Wilhelm Thiele		
1936	The Moon's Our Home	William A. Seiter		
1936	The Case Against Mrs. Ames	William A. Seiter		
1936	The Luckiest Girl in the World	Edward Buzzell		
1937	Vogues of 1938	Irving Cummings		
1937	Stand-In	Tay Garnett		
1938	Blockade	William Dieterle		
1938	Trade Winds	Tay Garnett		
1939	Stagecoach	John Ford	Nominated for an Academy Award for Best Film Editing	
1939	Winter Carnival	Charles Reisner		
1939	Eternally Yours	Tay Garnett		
1939	Slightly Honorable	Tay Garnett		
1940	The House Across the Bay	Archie Mayo		
1940	Foreign Correspondent	Alfred Hitchcock		
1941	Sundown	Henry Hathaway		
1941	The Captain from Köpenick	Richard Oswald		
1942	To Be or Not to Be	Ernst Lubitsch		
1943	Heaven Can Wait	Ernst Lubitsch		
1943	Happy Land	Irving Pichel		
1944	Lifeboat	Alfred Hitchcock		
1944	Sweet and Low-Down	Archie Mayo		
1945	A Tree Grows in Brooklyn	Elia Kazan		
1945	A Royal Scandal	Otto Preminger		
1945	Here Is Germany (Documentary)	Frank Capra		
1946	Dragonwyck	Joseph L. Mankiewicz		
1946	Cluny Brown	Ernst Lubitsch		
1946	My Darling Clementine	John Ford		
1947	The Ghost and Mrs. Muir	Joseph L. Mankiewicz		
1948	That Lady in Ermine	Ernst Lubitsch		
1948	The Snake Pit	Anatole Litvak		
1949	Down to the Sea in Ships	Henry Hathaway		
1950	Three Came Home	Jean Negulesco		
1950	Under My Skin	Jean Negulesco		
1951	Fourteen Hours	Henry Hathaway		
1951	Decision Before Dawn	Anatole Litvak	Nominated for an Academy Award for Best Film Editing	
1952	Lydia Bailey	Jean Negulesco		
1952	What Price Glory	John Ford		
1953	Tonight We Sing	Mitchell Leisen		
1953	Man on a Tightrope	Elia Kazan		
1953	Vicki	Harry Horner		
1954	Night People	Nunnally Johnson		
1954	Demetrius and the Gladiators	Delmer Daves		
1954	Broken Lance	Edward Dmytryk		
1954	Black Widow	Nunnally Johnson		
1955	Prince of Players	Philip Dunne		
1955	Soldier of Fortune	Edward Dmytryk		
1955	The Left Hand of God	Edward Dmytryk		
1955	The Rains of Ranchipur	Jean Negulesco		
1956	The Man in the Gray Flannel Suit	Nunnally Johnson		
1956	The Best Things in Life Are Free	Michael Curtiz		
1957	A Hatful of Rain	Fred Zinnemann		
1958	The Young Lions	Edward Dmytryk		
1959	The Journey	Anatole Litvak		
1959	A Private's Affair	Raoul Walsh		
1960	Seven Thieves	Henry Hathaway		
1960	From the Terrace	Mark Robson		
1960	North to Alaska	Henry Hathaway		
1961	Wild in the Country	Philip Dunne		
1963	Cleopatra	Joseph L. Mankiewicz	Nominated for an Academy Award for Best Film Editing	
1964	Circus World	Henry Hathaway		
1965	Von Ryan's Express	Mark Robson		
1966	Lost Command	Mark Robson		
1967	A Guide for the Married Man	Gene Kelly		
1967	Valley of the Dolls	Mark Robson		
1969	Daddy's Gone A-Hunting	Mark Robson		
1971	Happy Birthday, Wanda June	Mark Robson		
1972	Limbo	Mark Robson		
1974	Earthquake	Mark Robson	Nominated for an Academy Award for Best Film Editing	
1979	The Concorde... Airport '79	David Lowell Rich		

== See also ==
- List of film director and editor collaborations

== Bibliography ==
- Lev, Peter (2013). Twentieth Century-Fox: The Zanuck-Skouras Years, 1935–1965. Austin: University of Texas Press. ISBN 978-0-292-74447-9.
- Menuel, David (2016). Women Film Editors: Unseen Artists of American Cinema. Jefferson, North Carolina: McFarland & Company. ISBN 978-1-476-62520-1.
- Stern, Sydney Ladensohn (2019). The Brothers Mankiewicz: Hope, Heartbreak, and Hollywood Classics. University Press of Mississippi. ISBN 978-1-617-03267-7.
