= Devil's Island (1939 film) =

1939 film

- Film poster
- Directed by: William Clemens
- Written by: Anthony Coldeway; Raymond L. Schrock; Kenneth Gamet; Don Ryan
- Produced by: Bryan Foy
- Starring: Boris Karloff; Nedda Harrigan
- Cinematography: George Barnes
- Edited by: Frank Magee
- Distributed by: Warner Bros. Pictures
- Release date: January 7, 1939
- Running time: 62 minutes
- Country: United States
- Language: English
- Budget: under $500,000

Devil's Island is a 1939 American prison film directed by William Clemens and starring Boris Karloff. This film is notable for Karloff in a then-rare sympathetic role, as opposed to his usual antagonistic characters in horror films. The plot appears to have been recycled from John Ford's The Prisoner of Shark Island, which depicted the true story of doctor Samuel Mudd, who treated the injury of John Wilkes Booth after he assassinated Lincoln.

== Plot ==
In the early 20th century, respected French surgeon Dr. Charles Gaudet is sentenced to ten years imprisonment to the infamous French penal colony on Devil's Island for treating Gustave LeBrun, a fugitive revolutionary. His appeal rejected, and assigned to hard labor, it isn't long before Gaudet speaks out against the inhuman conditions at the prison, incurring the anger of the brutal prison commander, Colonel Armand Lucien. A revolt, led by Gaudet, is quashed after a guard is killed. Lucien's daughter, Collette, receives life-threatening wounds in an accident, and the camp doctor, Duval, does not have the skills to operate. Colonel Lucien seeks help from Gaudet offering to save him and the rebellious prisoners from the death penalty if he treats her. The surgery is a success, but Lucien executes the other prisoners involved in the revolt.

Madame Lucien, the Colonel's wife, devises a plan to assist Gaudet escape by bribing the guards. Gaudet, along with other prisoners, escapes the island in a boat; but, Lucien discovers his wife's involvement. Out of gas and water, the prisoners are picked up by a convict ship bound for Devil's Island. Gaudet and the other escapees are sentenced to be executed. Madame Lucien seeks help from Demonpre, the Minister of the Colonies. Demonpre arrives just in time, arrests Lucien for the injustices he implemented, and informs Gaudet that his case has been reviewed and he has been pardoned.

== Cast ==
- Boris Karloff as Dr. Charles Gaudet
- Nedda Harrigan as Madame Lucien
- James Stephenson as Col. Armand Lucien
- Adia Kuznetzoff as Pierre
- Rolla Gourvitch as Collette
- Will Stanton as Bobo
- Edward Keane as Dr. Duval
- Robert Warwick as Demonpre
- Pedro de Cordoba as Marcal
- Tom Wilson as Emil
- John Harmon as Andre
- Richard Bond as Georges
- Earl Gunn as Leon
- Sidney Bracy as Soupy
- George Lloyd as Dogface
- Charles Richman as Governor Beaufort
- Stuart Holmes as Gustav LeBrun
- Leonard Mudie as Advocate General
- Egon Brecher as Debriac
- Frank Reicher as President of Assize Court

== Production ==
The film was originally made when France announced it was giving up Devil's Island as a penal colony. The French government then changed its mind. Warners temporarily shelved the film then released it.

== Reception ==
The film depicts the French judicial system as antiquated, unfair, and biased. The depiction of Devil's Island upset the French government. They put a two-month ban on any Warners film entering France or its colonies.

Fear of something similar happening resulted in a proposed 1947 film from Columbia, The End of Devil's Island, being cancelled.

== See also ==
- Boris Karloff filmography
