= On the Level (1930 film) =

1930 film

- Directed by: Irving Cummings
- Screenplay by: Andrew Bennison; William K. Wells; Dudley Nichols
- Story by: Andrew Bennison; William K. Wells
- Starring: Victor McLaglen; William Harrigan; Lilyan Tashman; Fifi D'Orsay; Arthur Stone; Leila McIntyre
- Cinematography: L. William O'Connell; Dave Ragin
- Edited by: Alfred DeGaetano
- Production company: Fox Film Corporation
- Distributed by: Fox Film Corporation
- Release date: May 18, 1930
- Running time: 76 minutes
- Country: United States
- Language: English

On the Level is a 1930 American pre-Code action film directed by Irving Cummings and written by Andrew Bennison, William K. Wells and Dudley Nichols. The film stars Victor McLaglen, William Harrigan, Lilyan Tashman, Fifi D'Orsay, Arthur Stone and Leila McIntyre. The film was released on May 18, 1930, by Fox Film Corporation.

== Cast ==
- Victor McLaglen as Biff Williams
- William Harrigan as Danny Madden
- Lilyan Tashman as Lynn Crawford
- Fifi D'Orsay as Miimi
- Arthur Stone as Don Bradley
- Leila McIntyre as Mom Whalen
- Mary McAllister as Mary Whalen
- Ben Hewlett as Buck
- Harry Tenbrook as Dawson
- R.O. Pennell as Professor
