= On Trial (1939 film) =

1939 film by Terry O. Morse

- Directed by: Terry O. Morse
- Screenplay by: Don Ryan
- Based on: On Trial (1914 play) by Elmer Rice
- Starring: Margaret Lindsay; Edward Norris
- Cinematography: L. William O'Connell
- Edited by: James Gibbon
- Music by: Cecil Luskin; Bob Ross
- Production company: Warner Bros. Pictures
- Distributed by: Warner Bros. Pictures
- Release date: April 1, 1939
- Running time: 61-62, or 65, minutes
- Country: United States
- Language: English

On Trial is a 1939 drama film directed by Terry O. Morse and produced and distributed by Warner Bros. Pictures. It is based on the 1914 Broadway play by Elmer Rice. Warners had previously filmed Rice's play in 1928 as an early talkie, also called On Trial, and, earlier, in 1917, Essanay Studios had made a silent version with the same title.

== Cast ==
- Margaret Lindsay as Mae Strickland
- John Litel as Robert Strickland
- Edward Norris as William Arbuckle
- Janet Chapman as Doris Strickland
- James Stephenson as Gerald Trask
- Nedda Harrigan as Joan Trask
- Larry Williams as Glover
- William B. Davidson as Gray

- Earl Dwire as Judge
- Gordon Hart as Dr. Morgan
- Kenneth Harlan as John Trumbell, juror 3
- Vera Lewis as Mrs. Leeds, juror 8
- Nat Carr as Clerk
- Stuart Holmes as Mr. Summers, juror 6
- Charles Trowbridge as Henry Dean
- Sidney Bracey as Joe Burke

== Production ==
The working title for the film was "The Strickland Case", and it was originally intended to be directed by William McGann.

== Preservation status ==
This film is preserved in the Library of Congress collection.
