= Tin Man (Star Trek: The Next Generation) =

- Star Trek: The Next Generation episode
- Episode no.: Season 3 Episode 20
- Directed by: Robert Sheerer
- Written by: Dennis Putman Bailey; David Bischoff
- Production code: 168
- Original air date: April 23, 1990
- Running time: 43:37

Guest appearances
- Michael Cavanaugh as Robert DeSoto; Peter Vogt as Romulan commander; Colm Meaney as Miles O'Brien; Harry Groener as Tam Elbrun

Episode chronology
← Previous "Captain's Holiday"	Next → "Hollow Pursuits"
- Star Trek: The Next Generation season 3

"Tin Man" is the 20th episode of the third season of the American science fiction television series Star Trek: The Next Generation, and the 68th episode overall. It was originally released on April 23, 1990, in broadcast syndication. It was written by Dennis Putman Bailey and David Bischoff with uncredited work by Lisa Putman White. It was based on Bailey and Bischoff's 1976 short story, and subsequent 1979 novel, Tin Woodman. Both the short story/novel and the episode are named for the Tin Woodman from L. Frank Baum's Oz books.

Set in the 24th century, the series follows the adventures of the Starfleet crew of the Federation starship Enterprise-D. In this episode, telepath Tam Elbrun (Harry Groener) joins the crew to investigate a bioship detected near a star about to go supernova. As the crew investigates, the Romulans threaten the Enterprise and the creature/spacecraft, Gomtuu, and Elbrun boards it with Lt. Commander Data (Brent Spiner). As the star is about to explode, Gomtuu sends Data back to the Enterprise and the two ships out of the system. Gomtuu and Elbrun leave together as the star goes supernova.

The spec script was chosen as the crew believed it could go into production quickly. After purchasing it, the production of this episode began a week later. Groener guest starred as Elbrun, the first male Betazoid seen on the show. Michael Cavanaugh appeared as Captain Robert DeSoto, a character that was mentioned in "Encounter at Farpoint" and later in the franchise. The design of Gomtuu was based on an element from The Adventures of Buckaroo Banzai Across the 8th Dimension, while the chair creation special effect was made using reverse motion. "Tin Man" received Nielsen ratings of 10.2 percent. Critical reception has been mixed.

== Plot ==
The Enterprise brings aboard the Betazoid Federation emissary Tam Elbrun (Harry Groener), and takes him to a distant star system. Elbrun, whom Deanna Troi (Marina Sirtis) previously knew when he was a mental patient, has a history of mental instability due to his overpoweringly strong telepathic capabilities, but his unique skills are used for first contact situations with alien life. However, some of the crew, including William Riker, mistrust him, due to an incident during another first contact situation in which he was involved with another Federation ship. A misunderstanding broke out that led to the deaths of 47 Starfleet personnel, including two of Riker's friends from his Starfleet Academy class and the ship's captain. On this particular mission, Elbrun's abilities are needed to try to coax a giant sentient spaceship, codenamed "Tin Man", away from a star that is about to go supernova. It also comes to light that the star is in a Romulan-claimed area of space, and that this is a race to claim the ship. Elbrun finds it impossible to filter out the thoughts of the Enterprise crew. Elbrun finds solace in developing a friendship with Lt. Commander Data (Brent Spiner), by whom Elbrun is initially puzzled, finding what he calls "absence of mind"; Data, being an artificial lifeform, has no organic mind to be read.

When they arrive, the Enterprise is attacked and disabled by a Romulan Warbird that has overly stressed its engines to catch up to them. The Romulans race ahead to try to communicate with Tin Man. When Elbrun gleans from the Romulans telepathically that they intend to destroy Tin Man if they cannot claim it, he sends a telepathic warning to Tin Man. Tin Man suddenly comes to life and emits an energy wave that destroys the Warbird and further damages the Enterprise. Elbrun, now in communication with Tin Man, reveals that it calls itself Gomtuu. The creature is millennia old and formerly had a crew, but they were lost in a radiation accident. Due to a combination of remorse, loneliness, and a lack of purpose, Gomtuu wishes to die in the supernova. Elbrun requests to be beamed aboard the creature, but Captain Jean-Luc Picard (Patrick Stewart) is cautious of this action. When a second Warbird arrives, Picard lets Elbrun transport to Gomtuu along with Data to help procure the ship. Elbrun is initially overwhelmed by Gomtuu, but eventually comes to identify himself with the ship.

With the supernova imminent, the elated Elbrun informs Data he will stay with Gomtuu, believing it is where he truly belongs. Moments before the start of the supernova, Gomtuu creates another energy wave that sends the Enterprise and the Warbird spinning out of the star system in separate directions before they are caught in the nova blast. As the Enterprise regains control, they find Data aboard the bridge; he reports what happened aboard Gomtuu. When Data discusses the events with Troi, Data comes to realize that like Elbrun with Gomtuu, the Enterprise is where he belongs.

== Production ==
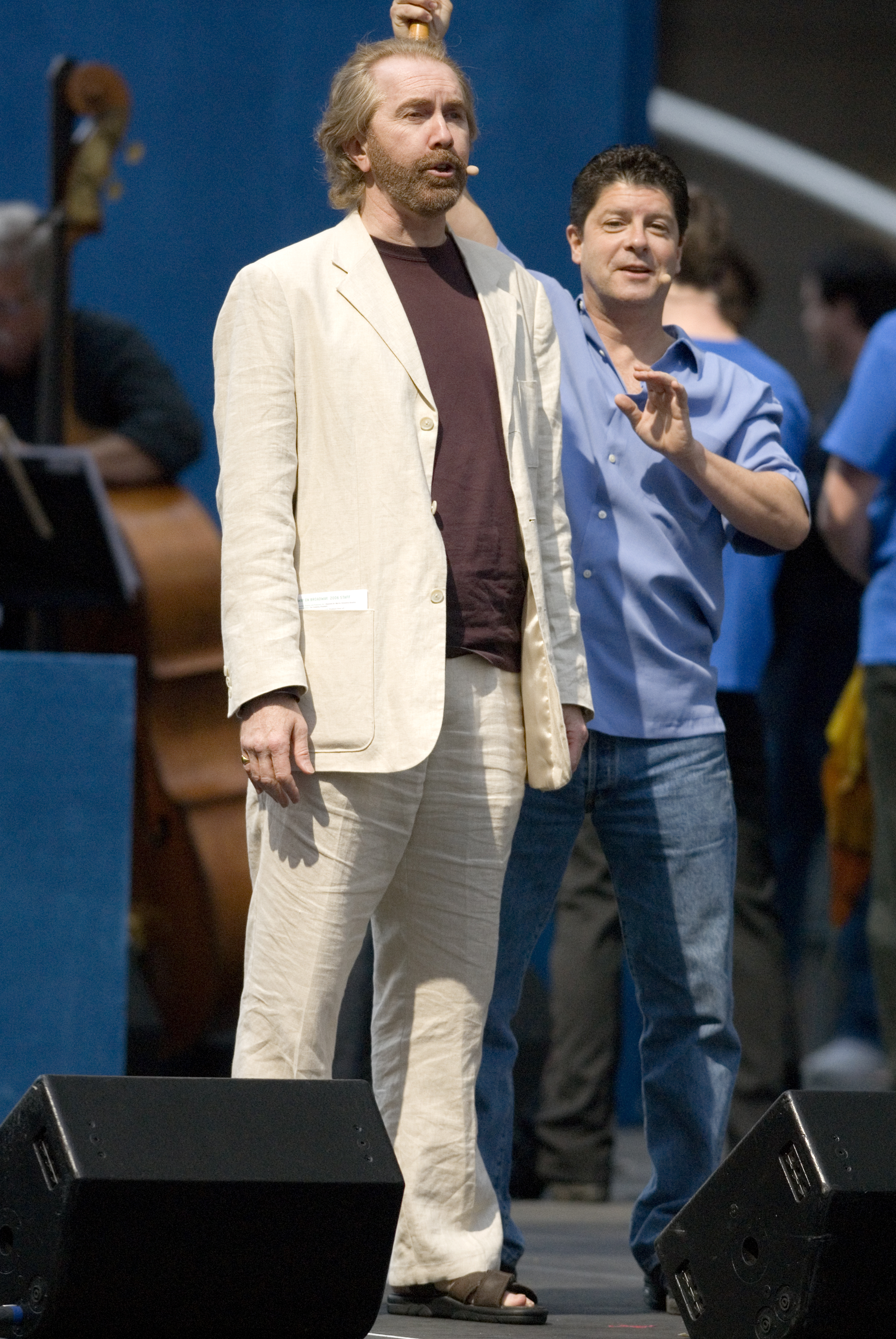
Harry Groener (pictured in 2006), appeared in "Tin Man" as the first male Betazoid seen in the series, Tam Elbrun.

"Tin Man" was based on a 1976 short story Tin Woodman by Dennis Russell Bailey and David Bischoff, which had been originally published in Amazing Science Fiction Stories and later expanded into a novel in 1979. The short story had been nominated for a Nebula Award in 1977. The name of the story and of the episode were both references to the Tin Woodman from L. Frank Baum's Oz books. Bailey and Bischoff had been inspired to pitch for The Next Generation due to their combined dislike of the first five minutes of the second season episode "Samaritan Snare". When uncredited co-writer Lisa Putman White spoke to the crew of the series during the second season, she was told by Eric A. Stillwell that the show only wanted bottle episodes. So together with Bischoff and Bailey, the short story was redeveloped into a spec script following Bischoff's suggestion.

The script was received by script editor Melinda M. Snodgrass at a fortunate time. The crew were looking for a script which could go immediately into production in order to free up time to work on other scripts which needed more work. She handed it to executive producer Michael Piller, who thought it didn't need much work. He passed it onto fellow executive producer Rick Berman, who held onto it for a week while the writers chased the production crew for updates. The script was then purchased, and Bailey, Bischoff and White were informed that it was due to go into production a week later.

Harry Groener made his first appearance in Star Trek as the Betazoid Tam Elbrun, the first male of the species seen on screen. Michael Cavanaugh also appeared as Captain Robert DeSoto of the USS Hood. DeSoto had first been mentioned in the pilot of The Next Generation, "Encounter at Farpoint", as Commander William Riker's former commanding officer. In a deleted scene, it would have been mentioned that DeSoto and Picard had served together as lieutenants previously. The character would go on to be mentioned later in the series in "The Pegasus", and in the Star Trek: Deep Space Nine episode "Treachery, Faith, and the Great River" as well as in several non-canonical books. "Tin Man" was directed by Robert Sheerer, who was disappointed with the result as he felt he could have created a better episode.

The creation of Gomtuu required work across several different departments on the series. Rick Sternbach and Greg Jein's design for the external appearance of Gomtuu was inspired by the thermal pods in the 1984 science fiction film The Adventures of Buckaroo Banzai Across the 8th Dimension. The special effect in which a chair was formed on the creature's bridge was created by visual effects supervisor Robert Legato, who created a wax chair and melted it, then played it backwards in reverse motion for the effects shot. The interior sound of Gomtuu was a recording of sound editor James Wolvington's stomach through a stethoscope. Furthermore, the musical score for the episode was a Star Trek debut for Jay Chattaway, who from towards the end of the fourth season onwards would begin to alternate work on episodes with Dennis McCarthy.

== Reception ==
=== Broadcast ===
"Tin Man" aired in broadcast syndication during the week commencing April 23, 1990. It received Nielsen ratings of 10.2, reflecting the percentage of all households watching the episode during its timeslot. This placed it as the third highest viewed syndicated show of the week, but saw a decrease from the 11.7 percent who watched the previous first run episode, "Captain's Holiday". However, it was seen by more viewers than the following episode, "Hollow Pursuits", which received a Nielsen rating of 9.8 percent.

=== Critical reception ===
In Beyond the Final Frontier: An Unauthorised Review of Star Trek, Mark Jones and Lance Parkin described "Tin Man" as "a good episode" and described Elbrun as becoming "annoying very quickly", while Gomtuu was not as unusual as the script suggested. James Van Hise and Hal Schumer in The Complete Trek: The Next Generation also described "Tin Man" as a "good episode", but said that both the Romulan threat and the animosity towards Elbrun felt "contrived". They praised the characterization seen in several scenes, and the idea for Elbrun.

Keith DeCandido reviewed the episode for Tor.com and gave it a seven out of ten. He criticised the "one-dimensional" Peter Vogt and lamented the lack of Andreas Katsulas in "Tin Man", but praised Groener, calling him "simply stellar". DeCandido credited the performance of Groener and the strong science fiction elements of "Tin Man" as creating a "strong episode", but he criticized the actions of the Romulans as simply being there to advance the plot. Zack Handlen reviewed "Tin Man" in 2010 for The A.V. Club, giving it a rating of "B+". He suggested that it could have been better than it ultimately was. Handlen praised Groener generally, but he found his performance as Elbrun "off-putting", although suggested it was perhaps deliberately so. Handlen suggested that Gomtuu could have had more of a personality, and the ending should not have been quite so predictable or convenient.

James Hunt wrote about the episode for Den of Geek in 2014, calling it a "trite, predictable episode that you're best off skipping". He said the main issue was the highly predictable ending, but also criticized the scenes with Data which he said were "massively trite and worse still, tacked on". In 2014, the episode was ranked as the 68th best out of the 700 plus episodes in the Star Trek franchise by Charlie Jane Anders for io9.

In 2018, CBR rated Gomtuu as the 16th most powerful spacecraft in the Star Trek universe, noting the vehicle for its ability to destroy a Romulan Warbird.

== Home media release ==
"Tin Man" was first released on VHS cassette on August 8, 1991 in the United States and Canada. The episode was released with Star Trek: The Next Generation season three DVD box set, released in the United States on July 2, 2002. This had 26 episodes of Season 3 on seven discs, with a Dolby Digital 5.1 audio track. It was released in high-definition Blu-ray in the United States on April 30, 2013.

== See also ==
- "Galaxy's Child" (season 4 episode with bioship)
- Bioship (spacecraft)
