= David Bischoff =

American science fiction and television writer (1951–2018)

- Born: December 15, 1951; Washington, D.C., U.S.
- Died: March 19, 2018 (aged 66); Eugene, Oregon, U.S.
- Occupations: Novelist; writer; educator
- Writing career
- Pen name: Mark Grant, Michael F. X. Milhaus
- Genres: Science fiction, Fantasy

David F. Bischoff (December 15, 1951 – March 19, 2018) was an American science fiction and television writer.

== General background ==
Born in Washington, D.C., Bischoff wrote science fiction books, short stories, and scripts for television. He began writing during the early 1970s and had more than 80 books published. Bischoff was known best for novelizations of popular movies and television series including Aliens, Gremlins 2: The New Batch, Star Trek: The Next Generation, and WarGames.

== Early career ==
Bischoff began writing science fiction and reviews of the genre while studying at the University of Maryland. His first publications were for Thrust, a fanzine offering science fiction commentary and criticism. The editor, Doug Fratz, later converted Thrust to a trade magazine, for which Bischoff was a regular contributor.

His first novel, The Seeker (with Christopher Lampton) was published in 1976, and in 1978 Bischoff coauthored "Tin Woodman", a short story nominated for a Nebula Award in that year, and later adapted into both a novel and television episode for Star Trek: The Next Generation.

== Movies and television ==
Bischoff worked on various television series such as Star Trek: The Next Generation, where he coauthored the episodes "Tin Man" (with Dennis Putman Bailey) and "First Contact" (with Dennis Russell Bailey and Joe Menosky & Ronald D. Moore and Michael Piller) (not to be confused with the movie Star Trek: First Contact). He also wrote the Star Trek novel Grounded, which was a bestseller.

Other TV work included Dinosaucers (with Ted Pedersen) produced by DIC Entertainment. He also wrote the second of 24 books in the Time Machine series, Search for Dinosaurs, which is actually about finding Archaeopteryx, the first bird.

In addition to some seventy-five original novels, Bischoff wrote tie-in novels for well-known movies and TV series such as Aliens, Alien Versus Predator, Farscape, Gremlins 2: The New Batch, Space Precinct, SeaQuest DSV, and Jonny Quest. He also wrote show-business related nonfiction using a variety of pseudonyms.

In 2000, The Washington Post termed him the "greatest living wrestling writer" for his work as "Winchell Dredge" for Wild Rampage Wrestling magazine.

== Teaching ==
Bischoff taught creative writing at Seton Hill University, Pennsylvania.

== Selected bibliography ==
=== Novels ===
- The Seeker (1976, with Christopher Lampton)
- The Phantom of the Opera (1977)
- Forbidden World (1978, with Ted White)
- Tin Woodman (1979, with Dennis Russell Bailey)
- Star Fall (1980)
- The Selkie (1982)
- Mandala (1983)
- Wargames (1983)
- The Crunch Bunch (1985)
- A Personal Demon (1985)
- The Manhattan Project (1986)
- Some Kind of Wonderful (1987)
- The Blob (1989)
- The Judas Cross (1994, with Charles Sheffield)
- Hackers (1995)
- Philip K. Dick High (2000)
- The Diplomatic Touch (2001)
- The H. P. Lovecraft Institute (2002)
- Jack London, Star Warrior (2003)
- J. R. R. Tolkien University (2003)
- The Tawdry Yellow Brick Road (2004)

=== Fiction series ===
- Aliens
  - Genocide (1994), repr. in:
  - Aliens Omnibus Volume 2 (1996)
- Aliens vs. Predator
  - Hunter's Planet (1994), repr. in:
  - Aliens vs Predator Omnibus (1995)
- Bill, the Galactic Hero
  - Bill, the Galactic Hero on the Planet of Tasteless Pleasure (1991)
  - Bill, the Galactic Hero on the Planet of Ten Thousand Bars (1991)
- Daniel M. Pinkwater's Melvinge of the Megaverse
  - Night of the Living Shark! (1991)
- Dr. Dimension
  - Dr. Dimension (1993, with John DeChancie)
  - Masters of Spacetime (1994)
- Dragonstar
  - Dragonstar (1980) nominated for the AnLab Award in 1982 for best Serial
  - Day of the Dragonstar (1983)
  - Night of the Dragonstar (1985)
  - Dragonstar Destiny (1989)
- Farscape
  - Ship of Ghosts (2001)
- Gaming Magi
  - The Destiny Dice (1985)
  - Wraith Board (1985)
  - The Unicorn Gambit (1986)
- Gremlins
  - The New Batch (1988)
- Mutants Amok
  - Mutants Amok (1991)
  - Mutant Hell (1991)
  - Rebel Attack (1991)
  - Holocaust Horror (1991)
- Nightworld
  - Nightworld (1979)
  - Vampires of Nightworld (1981)
- SeaQuest DSV
  - SeaQuest DSV: The Ancient (1994)
- Space Precinct
  - The Deity-Father (1995)
  - Demon Wing (1995)
  - Alien Island (1996)
- Star Fall
  - Star Fall (1980)
  - Star Spring (1982)
- Star Hounds
  - The Infinite Battle (1985)
  - Galactic Warriors (1985)
  - The Macrocosmic Conflict (1986)
- Star Trek: The Next Generation
  - Grounded (1993)
- The Crow
  - A Murder of Crows (1998)
  - Quoth the Crow (1998)
- The UFO Conspiracy
  - Abduction (1990)
  - Deception (1991)
  - Revelation (1991)
- Time Machine
  - Search for Dinosaurs (1984)

=== Short story collections ===
- Tripping the Dark Fantastic (2000)

=== Anthologies edited by David Bischoff ===
- Quest (1977)
- Strange Encounters (1977)

=== Short fiction ===
- "The Most Dangerous Man in the World" (1974)
- "The Sky's An Oyster; The Stars Are Pearls" (1975)
- "Feeding Time" (1976)
- "Heavy Metal" (1976)
- "Tin Woodman" (1976) nominated for a Nebula Award in 1978
- "The Apprentice" (1977)
- "Top Hat" (1977)
- "In Medias Res" (1978)
- "Alone and Palely Loitering" (1978)
- "All the Stage, A World" (1979)
- "Outside" (1980)
- "Waterloo Sunset" (1982)
- "The Warmth of the Stars" (1983)
- "Wired" (1983)
- "Copyright Infringement" (1984)
- "Cooking with Children" (1989)
- "(Excerpt) Mutant Hell" (1991)
- "Spare Change" (1991)
- "High Concept" (1993)
- "The Big Nap" (1993)
- "Dr. Dimension" (1993)
- "Santa Ritual Abuse" (1995)
- "Be Still My Heart: The Bartender's Tale" (1995)
- "Cam Shaft" (1996)
- "Brigbuffoon" (1996)
- "Vicious Wishes" (1996)
- "Fade" (1996)
- "The Xaxrkling of J. Arnold Boysenberry" (1997)
- "In the Bleak Mid-Solstice" (1997)
- "The S-Files" (1998)
- "Tooth or Consequences" (1998)
- "Tooth or Consequence" (1998)
- "Bongoid" (1998)
- "Mushroom Tea" (1999)
- "Sittin' on the Dock" (1999)
- "Joy to the World" (1999)
- "A Ghost of a Chance" (1999)
- "I Have No Blimp and I Must Dream" (2000)
- "Love After Death" (2000)
- "Fat Farm" (2000)
- "Side Effects" (2000)
- "May Oysters Have Legs" (2000)
- "CD OM" (2000)
- "Rounded by a Sleep" (2000)
- "The Last Full Measure" (2000)
- "A Game of Swords" (2000)
- "The Whiteviper Scrolls" (2001)
- "Mutant Mother from Hell: A "Fizz Smith" Story" (2001)
- "The Tenth Wonder of the World" (2001)
- "Books" (2002)
- "The Sorcerer's Apprentice's Apprentice" (2002)
- "Die, Christmas, Die!" (2004)
- "Lonesome Diesel" (2004)
- "Heathcliff's Notes" (2004)
- "Enter All Abandon, Ye Who Hope Here" (2005)
- "Quoth the Screaming Chicken" (2006)
- "Further" (2006)
- "The Man Who Would Be Overlord" (2007)
- "Young Sun Ra and the Strange Celestial Roads" (2012)
- "Hi Ted" (2012)

== Death ==
Bischoff died on March 19, 2018. The cause was complications from liver disease, according to his former wife, Martha Bayless.
