= Blight Magic =

Blight Magic is a 2002 supplement for d20 System role-playing games published by Mystic Eye Games.

== Contents ==
Blight Magic is a supplement in which a dark, corrupting form of spellcasting is detailed that drains the life of the land for power, offering new rituals, spells, feats, and prestige classes built around this dangerous and morally corrosive art.

== Reviews ==
- Pyramid
- Asgard #7
- Fictional Reality #9
