= Dragonstar (role-playing game) =

Science fantasy game

Dragonstar is a science fantasy game created by Fantasy Flight Games for Wizards of the Coast's D20 role-playing game system.

== Setting ==
The game's setting is a galaxy under the dominion of the Dragon Empire. The Dragon Empire is an empire ruled by the ten houses of dragons. Of these houses, five are chromatic and five are metallic. The Empire is led by Mezzenbone, an evil red dragon.

Across the galaxy, fantasy races inhabit countless worlds. Scientists and archmages in the game try to come up with a logical explanation as to why the races had similar linguistic traits. Eventually, a prominent religious leader proposed a theory: all the gods of every religion were the same, just different aspects of the twelve "True Gods". These aspects were the 12 "Deitypes," short for Deity Archetypes. Deitypes are basic, primordial, archetypal icons such as The Father, The Mother, The Magus, The Smith, The Destroyer and The Trickster. Some deities have elements of two or more Deitypes. These 12 Deitypes seeded similarities all across the life-supporting worlds of the galaxy. This theory led to a new religion that formed the basis of an emerging unified interstellar culture. The dragons eventually rose to dominate and unite this culture under a single massive Dragon Empire that rules all of inhabited space. The dragons would assimilate newly discovered inhabited planets along the edge of the Empire, also known as the Outlands.

The Dragonstar setting can easily combine preexisting Dungeons & Dragons and other D20 material and settings. A PC group can be made up of character races and classes in any combination and be rationally integrated with little work. It is similar to the classic Spelljammer setting by TSR, although Dragonstar is more of a blend of science fantasy and space opera. A basic premise of the setting is that advanced technology is sufficient to handle most tasks, but things that are considered impossible by our current understanding of physics, such as faster-than-light travel between stars, force-fields, and teleportation, are accomplished with magic. Characters use a combination of technology, conventional weaponry and magic in combat.

== History ==
The game was first announced on the Fantasy Flight website on December 5, 2001. The space opera science fantasy Dragonstar (2001) was the first d20 setting that Fantasy Flight Games published; FFG published several supplements for the setting between 2001-2003. Sometime between 2007 and 2008, the company decided to end support for the game. The game still has a fully functioning website with a support page and message boards.

== Reception ==
In a review of Dragonstar in Black Gate, Tom Doolan said "Perhaps one of the biggest strengths is the flexibility. A Dragonstar game can include traditional fantasy, space opera, hard science-fiction, horror, or any other adventure type you can think of (my own highly successful campaign was a blend of Firefly and D&D)."

== Publications ==
The following products were published by Fantasy Flight games for the Dragonstar campaign setting:

- DS01 Starfarer's Handbook (ISBN 978-1589940567)
- DS02 Guide to the Galaxy (ISBN 978-1589940574)
- DS03 Imperial Supply (ISBN 978-1589940604)
- DS04 Player's Companion (ISBN 978-1589940260)
- DS05 Galactic Races (ISBN 978-1589940789)
- DS06 Smuggler's Run (ISBN 978-1589941328)

The following products were licensed for publication by Mystic Eye Games (now defunct) for the Dragonstar Campaign setting:

- MYG1101 Raw Recruits (ISBN 978-0971923867) - An adventure for characters of Levels 1 - 6
- MYG1102 Heart of the Machine (ISBN 978-1932374063) - An adventure for characters of Level 4

== See also ==
- Mystic Warriors (Mystic Eye Games)
