= Librum Equitis Volume I =

Librum Equitis Volume I is a 2001 role-playing game supplement published by Ambient, Inc., with a second edition released in 2002 by Mystic Eye Games. The book was produced for the d20 System and focuses on knightly characters, presenting material related to chivalric traditions, character options, and gameplay mechanics centered on mounted warriors and martial orders.

== Contents ==
Librum Equitis Volume I is a supplement in which over twenty prestige classes are offered—from classics like the Swashbuckler to oddities like the Corpulent and PsychoPyretic—along with feats, items, and NPCs designed to drop into any fantasy campaign.

== Reviews ==
- Pyramid
- Fictional Reality #9
- d20Zine #3 (Dec., 2002)
- RPGNow Downloader Monthly (Issue 2 - Jan 2003)
