= Jennie Yeamans =

Australian actress

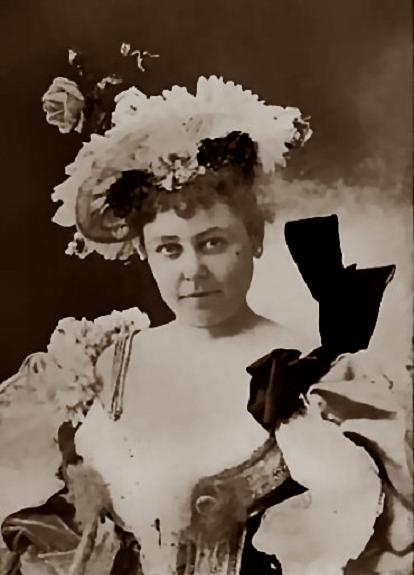
- Born: Eugenia Marguerite Yeamans; 18 October 1862; Sydney, Australia
- Died: 28 November 1906 (aged 44); New York City, New York, U.S.
- Occupations: Actress, singer
- Years active: 1870s–1890s
- Relatives: Annie Yeamans(mother); Lydia Yeamans Titus(sister)

Jennie Yeamans (born Eugenia Marguerite Yeamans; 18 October 1862 – 28 November 1906) was a child actress and singer popular in the 1870s and 1880s, and later a famous adult singer and actress. She was the younger sister of early silent film character actress Lydia Yeamans Titus and had another sister, Emily Yeamans, who died young.

Of the three, Jennie was the most famous and successful right up to her death. Their mother was Annie Yeamans (1835–1912), a character actress in the Victorian era stage. Her father was Edward Yeamans (died 1866 or 1868), a circus clown. The Yeamans family came from Australia and toured China, Japan and Java in traveling shows before arriving in San Francisco in 1865. After arriving in America, Edward Yeamans died in 1866 or 1868.

As an adult, Jennie appeared in a popular stage melodramas or musicals; one musical being Blue Jeans in 1890, which was later made into a 1917 silent film Blue Jeans, starring Viola Dana. For a time Yeamans was married to impresario Charles B. Dillingham.

Yeamans died of tuberculosis on 28 November 1906 at the Hotel Gerard in New York City where she and her mother Annie lived. Just before her death, Jennie and her mother Annie appeared at a benefit show in San Francisco to provide aid for survivors of the San Francisco Earthquake
