= Necromancer's Legacy: Thee Compleat Librum ov Gar'Udok's Necromantic Artes =

Necromancer's Legacy: Thee Compleat Librum ov Gar'Udok's Necromantic Artes is a 2002 role-playing game supplement for d20 System games published by Ambient, Inc., with a revised version by Mystic Eye Games in 2003.

== Contents ==
Necromancer's Legacy: Thee Compleat Librum ov Gar'Udok's Necromantic Artes is a supplement in which spells, creatures, classes, items, and campaign material are rooted in the rise and ruin of the necromancer Gar'Udok, whose legacy endures through his artifacts, minions, and the dark powers they bestow.

== Reviews ==
- Pyramid
- Fictional Reality (Issue 11 – Mar 2003)
- Legions Realm Monthly (Issue 7 – Mar 2003)
- Valkyrie (Issue 27 – 2003)
