= Lydia Yeamans Titus =

Australian-born American singer, dancer, comedienne, and actress (1857–1929)

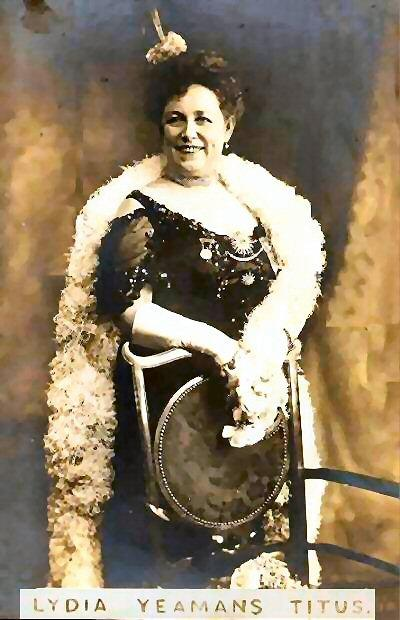
- Titus, c. 1910
- Born: Lydia Annie Yeamans; 12 December 1857; Tasman Sea, between Sydney and Melbourne
- Died: 30 December 1929 (aged 72); Los Angeles, California, U.S.
- Occupations: Stage and screen actress
- Spouse: Frederick J. Titus
- Relatives: Jennie Yeamans(sister)

Lydia Yeamans Titus (12 December 1857 – 30 December 1929) was an Australian-born American singer, dancer, comedienne, and actress who had a lengthy career in vaudeville and cinema. She was remembered on stage for her "Baby-Talk" act and a popular rendition of the English ballad, "Sally in Our Alley". In appreciation, King Edward VII once presented Titus a gold bar pin with the opening notes of "Sally in Our Alley" etched in diamonds. In later life Titus became a pioneer in the medium of film appearing in at least 132 motion pictures between 1911 and 1930.

== Early life ==
Lydia Annie Yeamans was born off the coast of south eastern Australia during a voyage from Sydney to Melbourne. Her parents were Edward "Ned" Yeamans (died c. 1866), an American circus clown and comedian from New York, and Annie Griffiths (10 November 1835 – 3 March 1912), a British-born Australian circus equestrienne. Her parents married not long after Griffiths, then seventeen or eighteen, joined the Rowe Circus, an American tent show then performing in Australia.

In the mid-1860s her father, mother and baby sister Jennie settled in San Francisco after a circus tour that had encompassed Japan, China, Java and the Philippines. Titus and her younger sister Emily remained in Sydney with their grandparents and would not see their mother and sister again for nearly a decade. Ned Yeamans died after several seasons performing in circuses throughout the American West, leaving Annie Yeamans to pursue what turned out to be a long career in vaudeville and on the legitimate stage.

Titus and her sisters, Emily (c. 1859 – 20 February 1892) and Jennie (16 October 1862 – 28 November 1906), all began on stage as child actors with Jennie the more popular over their early years. Jennie's career was cut short while in her mid-forties, a fatality of tuberculosis, while Emily, a long-time character actress with Edward Harrigan's vaudeville company, fell victim to a lingering lung ailment at the age of 32.

== Stage ==
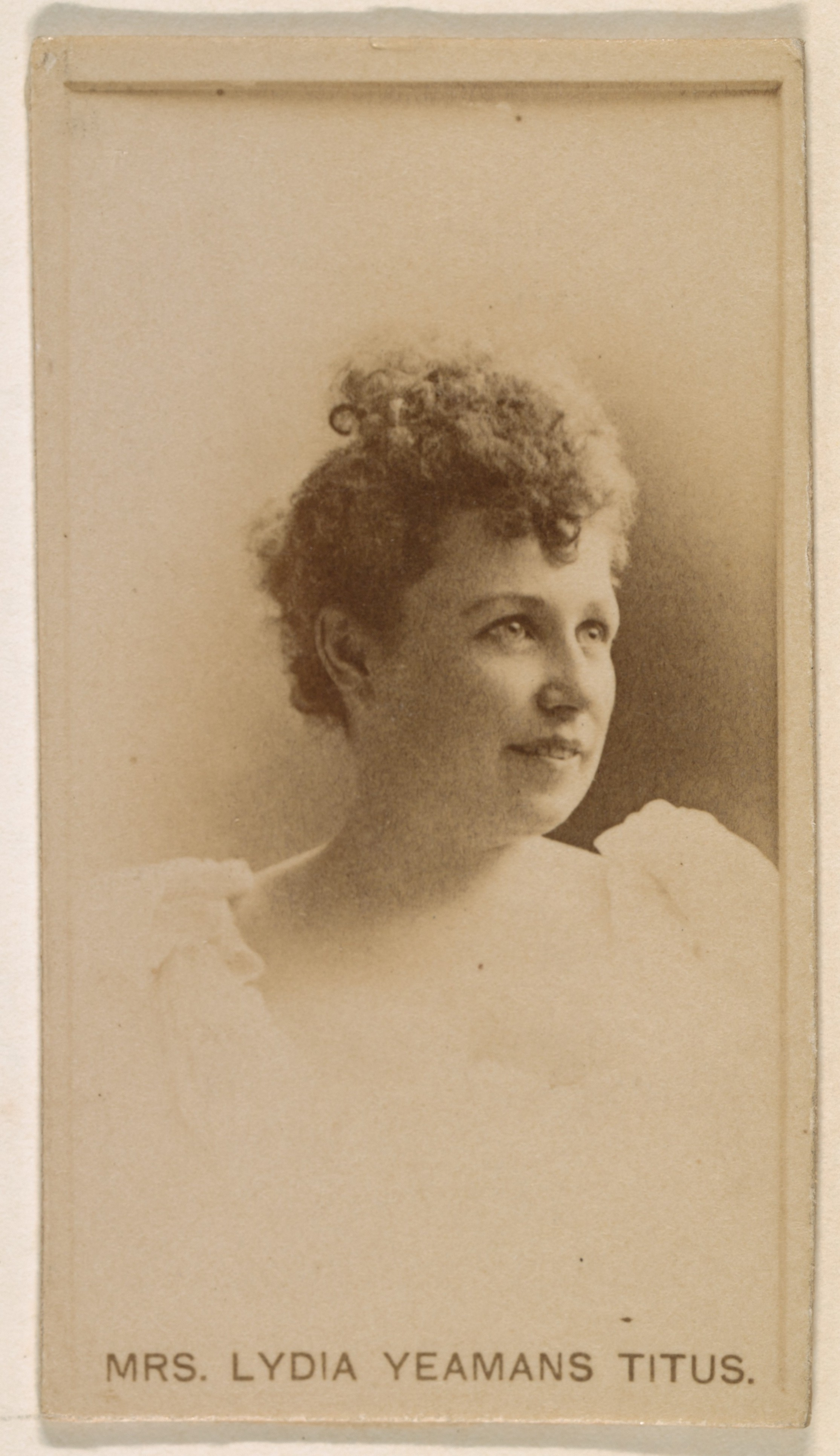
Mrs. Lydia Yeamans Titus, from the Actresses series (N245) issued by Kinney Brothers, 1890, Metropolitan Museum of Art

Titus began her solo career in the fall of 1875 as a song and dance act with Tony Pastor's vaudeville company and by the late 1880s she was billing herself as the "Anglo-American Lyric Star". During this period she became a popular act overseas in tours of Great Britain, Australia and New Zealand.

As a vaudeville attraction in 1900, Titus was made an honorary member of the Buffalo, New York Elks Lodge. She was later made an honorary member of the San Francisco lodge. Her imitations were masterpieces of the art of mimicry that captivated audiences with the personality she brought to each theatrical production.

The sole vocal and musical success is achieved by Miss Lydia Yeamans, who sings "Sally in Our Alley" so charmingly as, on the night of our visit at all events, to obtain a triple encore, so genuine, hearty, and unanimous, that it seemed as if the audience were delighted to have an opportunity of showing how thoroughly they could appreciate anything really good..

— Punch, 1887

The reappearance in town of Lydia Yeamans-Titus is always a matter of interest, for this artiste is invariably admirable, original and vivacious. She promises splendid new vocal selections, and her comedy work will, of course, be excellent.

— The Tammany Times (1895)

In songs descriptive of child-life Lydia Yeamans Titus has no superior on the contemporaneous stage. She is to the vaudeville profession what James Whitcomb Riley is to the lecture platform. Her delineations of "Peggy Cline," "In May," and "Sally in Our Alley" are historical in vaudeville annals. She readily commands a salary of two hundred dollars a week.

— Metropolitan Magazine, February 1897

In June 1892, she was engaged to perform at New York's Madison Square Garden. Before the first show her husband, pianist Frederick J. Titus, became upset over the piano the theatre had provided for their act and over an issue with their placement on the night's billing card. When the theatre's manager failed to address these matters the two refused to go on stage and stormed out of the theatre. A few days later the actress returned without her husband to ask the manager to release them from their contract. A heated argument followed in which Titus struck the manager several times with her umbrella leaving a cut below one eye. The police were called and she was arrested, although later the manager chose not to press charges and Titus was released from custody.

== Film ==
Titus began her movie career in 1911 in Brooklyn, New York with the Vitagraph Studios short film, A Tale of Two Cities. Beginning in 1915 she appeared in films produced by Bison Motion Pictures, Oliver Morosco Photoplay and Universal Studios. In 1919 she supported Geraldine Farrar as Mamie Connors in The World and Its Woman, a tale about a Russian peasant (Farrar) who rises to fame as an operatic diva. In the movie Titus sang some of the songs (although this was a silent film) that she performed for English royalty in the 1890s.

Titus's extensive filmography encompasses a good part of the silent film era and may have continued on into the talkies if she had not died in 1929. Her final picture was the early talkie Lummox, that debuted a few weeks after her death. Titus supported some of Hollywood's most well known and legendary stars like Rudolph Valentino (A Society Sensation, 1918), Lon Chaney (The Hunchback of Notre Dame), Ronald Colman (Tarnish, 1924) and Jackie Coogan (The Rag Man).

Colleen Moore wrote that she once spent her paycheck on a fur coat. Her director Charles Brabin pointed Titus out to her on the set and said that she'd lived a life of luxury as a darling of the London stage and had been given a brooch by King Edward – but she spent all her money and now she was eking out a living in small parts and was glad to take anything. Moore took the hint and returned the coat.

== Marriage ==
She was married to the actor and pianist Frederick J. Titus who served as her accompanist and business manager. He is sometimes reported to have previously been married to the actress Edna May, but this is incorrect as May was married to the champion American cyclist Frederick "Fred" J. Titus. Lydia Yeamans married Titus in about 1886. They had no children.

== Death ==
Lydia Yeamans Titus died in Los Angeles on 30 December 1929, aged 72, after suffering a paralytic stroke. Having been born at sea, she directed in her will that her remains be buried at sea. Accordingly, following her funeral services her ashes were scattered upon the waves of the Pacific Ocean along the Southern California Coast. Titus was widowed in 1918.

In the death of Lydia Yeamans Titus, Hollywood lost one of its most familiar and interesting characters.

The genial Mrs. Titus had appeared in innumerable pictures, and in support of most of the greatest stars. But her last days, interesting as they were, lacked the glamour of her earlier career when she was young and beautiful. It was Lydia Yeamens Titus who made Sally in Our Alley one of the most famous songs of a long-gone decade. King Edward VII of England heard her sing that favorite tune, and gave her a gold bar pin showing the first notes of the song in diamonds.

During the heyday of her prosperity Mrs. Titus gave $5,000 to the Actors' Fund for relief work. It was from this fund that she was cared for during her last days, together with the assistance of many loyal Hollywood friends.

— Photoplay Magazine, 1930

== Partial filmography ==
- Jane (1915)
- The Right to Be Happy (1916)
- David Garrick (1916)
- He Fell in Love with His Wife (1916)
- High Speed (1917)
- The Edge of the Law (1917)
- The Birth of Patriotism (1917)
- A Burglar for a Night (1918)
- The Fear Woman (1919)
- The Peace of Roaring River (1919)
- The World and Its Woman (1919)
- Nurse Marjorie (1920)
- Go and Get It (1920)
- Queenie (1921)
- The Mad Marriage (1921)
- The Concert (1921)
- The Mistress of Shenstone (1921)
- Beating the Game (1921)
- Beau Revel (1921)
- The Freeze-Out (1921)
- The Invisible Power (1921)
- Nobody's Fool (1921)
- His Nibs (1921)
- A Girl's Desire (1922)
- The Glory of Clementina (1922)
- Two Kinds of Women (1922)
- The Ghost Patrol (1923)
- Tarnish (1924)
- Big Timber (1924)
- The Lullaby (1924)
- In Fast Company (1924)
- Young Ideas (1924)
- The Fast Worker (1924)
- Head Winds (1925)
- Up the Ladder (1925)
- The Arizona Romeo (1925)
- Twinkletoes (1926)
- Lure of the Night Club (1927)
- Night Life (1927)
- Heroes in Blue (1927)
- The Water Hole (1928)
- Sweet Sixteen (1928)
- While the City Sleeps (1928)
- Shanghai Lady (1929)
- The Voice of the Storm (1929)
- Lummox (1930)
