= Nedda Harrigan =

American actress

- Born: August 24, 1899; New York City, U.S.
- Died: April 1, 1989 (aged 89); New York City, U.S.
- Other names: Hedda Harrigan; Nedda Logan
- Occupation: Actress
- Spouses: Walter Connolly (m. 1920; died 1940) Joshua Logan (m. 1945; died 1988)
- Children: 3
- Parent: Edward Harrigan (father)
- Relatives: William Harrigan (brother); David Braham (grandfather)

Nedda Harrigan Logan (August 24, 1899 – April 1, 1989) was an American actress.

== Early life ==
Harrigan was the youngest of 10 children of entertainer Edward Harrigan and his wife, Annie (Braham) Harrigan. Her grandfather was conductor David Braham, and one of her brothers was actor William Harrigan As a child, she sometimes appeared on stage with her father. Her first experiences in acting came at the National Park Seminary in Washington, D.C.

== Stage ==
In 1918, Harrigan was the leading lady in a production of Common Cause in San Francisco. She acted in stock theater companies, including the Woodward Players at the Majestic Theater in Detroit. Decades later, Harrigan reflected on the education that she gained from working in stock theater. "There were no [acting] schools then," she said. "But you see, there were a lot of stock companies. You learned an awful lot in stock. I played stock every year and learned by just doing."

In 1984, Harrigan was production consultant for Harrigan and Hart, a stage show about the entertainment team formed by her father and Tony Hart. In 1985, she performed with her husband, Joshua Logan, in An Evening with Joshua Logan, a show that reviewed his career as a director.

== Film ==
In 1934, Harrigan left New York's stages and went to Hollywood to act in the Columbia Pictures film I'll Fix It. She returned to Hollywood to make The Case of the Caretaker's Cat (1936). Her other films included Thank You, Mr. Moto (1937) and Devil's Island (1939).

== Public service ==
During World War II, Harrigan was a leading force in establishing the Stage Door Canteen, which produced plays for servicemen, and she led tours of plays to Europe to entertain troops. Harrigan also served as president of the Actors Fund, and was a founder of the Actors Fund Bloodbank and a trustee of the Museum of the City of New York.

Harrigan's long-term service to the United Service Organizations led to her being awarded the USO's Woman of the Year award in the 1980s.

== Personal life ==
In 1921, Harrigan married actor Walter Connolly, with whom she had a daughter. She later married Joshua Logan, a director and writer. On April 1, 1989, Harrigan died of cancer at her home in Manhattan at age 89.

The Actors Fund of America created the Nedda Harrigan Logan Award to honor Harrigan.

== Filmography ==
Year	Title	Role	Notes
1929	The Laughing Lady	Cynthia Bell	
1934	I'll Fix It	Miss Burns	
1936	The Case of the Black Cat	Nurse Louise DeVoe	
1936	Fugitive in the Sky	Mrs. Katie Tristo	
1936	Charlie Chan at the Opera	Mme. Anita Barelli	
1937	Thank You, Mr. Moto	Madame Tchernov	
1938	A Trip to Paris	Countess Varloff	
1938	Men Are Such Fools	Mrs.Nelson	
1939	Devil's Island	Madame Lucien	
1939	On Trial	Joan Trask	
1939	Scandal Sheet	Seena Haynes	
1939	The Honeymoon's Over	Mrs. Molly Burton	
1940	Castle on the Hudson	Mrs. Long	
1953	Main Street to Broadway	Herself	uncredited
