= Harry Groener =

German-born American actor and dancer (born 1951)

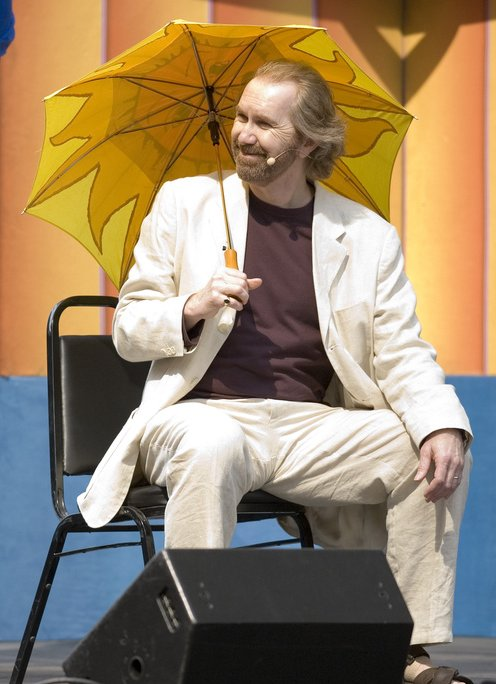
- Groener, September 2006
- Born: September 10, 1951 (age 75); Augsburg, Bavaria, West Germany
- Education: University of Washington (BFA)
- Occupations: Actor, dancer
- Awards: Theatre World Award winner 3 time Tony Award nominee

Harry Groener (born September 10, 1951) is an American actor and dancer, perhaps best known for playing Mayor Wilkins in Buffy the Vampire Slayer (seasons 3, 4 and 7). His accolades include a Theatre World Award, and nominations for three Tony Awards, two Drama Desk Awards, and an Outer Critics Circle Award.

== Early life ==
Groener was born in Augsburg, Bavaria, West Germany, to an opera singer mother and a father who worked as a concert pianist, office clerk, and composer. He immigrated to the United States with his family at the age of two. As a teenager, Groener was apprenticed at the San Francisco Ballet; he went on to attend the University of Washington's School of Drama, graduating in 1976.

== Career ==
Groener's reputation in New York City rests almost entirely on his work in musical theater. However, the bulk of his roles outside New York have been in classical drama or contemporary plays like Eastern Standard. His Broadway credits include Is There Life After High School?, Will Parker in Oklahoma! (Tony Award nomination, Theatre World Award), Munkustrap in Cats (Tony Award nomination), Georges/George in Sunday in the Park with George, and Bobby Child in Crazy for You (Tony Award and Outer Critics Circle Award nominations).

In 1999, he performed off-Broadway with Twiggy at the Lucille Lortel Theater in If Love Were All, a musical revue based on the friendship of Noël Coward and Gertrude Lawrence. He has performed in regional theatres across the country, including the San Diego Old Globe Theatre (where he is an associate artist), Antaeus Theatre Company (where he is a company member), as well as Steppenwolf Theatre Company, Mark Taper Forum, Geffen Playhouse, South Coast Repertory, Pasadena Playhouse, Chicago Shakespeare Theatre, Long Wharf Theater, A.C.T., and the Williamstown Theater Festival.

Groener has performed regularly on TV, including guest appearances on Star Trek: The Next Generation (1990), Star Trek: Voyager (1996), Star Trek: Enterprise (2005) and several dozen other series; he was also a series regular on the sitcom Dear John. In 1998-99, he portrayed Richard Wilkins, the evil mayor of Sunnydale on the third season of cult TV series Buffy the Vampire Slayer and reprised the role in cameo appearances in Buffy's 4th and 7th seasons.

From 2003 to 2006, he appeared as the chef Gunther on the TV series Las Vegas. Notable film work includes Road to Perdition and About Schmidt. He also appeared in two episodes of The West Wing as the Secretary of Agriculture and the Bones episode "The Woman at the Airport" as a plastic surgeon, Henry Atlas. In 2009, Groener appeared in the second season episode of Breaking Bad, "Bit by a Dead Bee", as protagonist Walter White's psychiatrist. He also portrayed Clint, Ted's stepdad, in How I Met Your Mother. In January 2018, Groener appeared in an episode of Young Sheldon.

He was a regular vocalist for the Varèse Sarabande label, performing on such recordings as Shakespeare on Broadway, Cole Porter: A Musical Toast, and various installments of the Unsung Broadway and Lost in Boston series. He played King Arthur in Monty Python's Spamalot during 2006. In 2010, he appeared as the title role in the Antaeus Company's production of King Lear. He won the L.A. Drama Critics Circle Award for this performance. In 2012, he starred in the debut of Christopher Hampton's play Appomattox at the Guthrie Theater in Minneapolis, playing a dual role as both U.S. presidents Abraham Lincoln in 1865 and Lyndon B. Johnson in 1965. As of 2023, he serves as an honorary board member at the Alpine Theater Project in Whitefish, MT.

== Filmography ==
=== Film ===
Year	Title	Role	Notes
1980	Brubaker	Dr. Campbell	
1997	Amistad	Tecora Captain	
1998	Dance with Me	Michael	
1998	Patch Adams	Dr. Prack	
1999	Buddy Boy	Father Gillespie	
2002	Road to Perdition	Mr. McDougal	
2002	About Schmidt	John Rusk	
2002	Manna from Heaven	Tony	
2006	The Last Time	Customer at Conference	
2008	Beautiful Loser	Ronald Riley	
2015	The Atticus Institute	Lawrence Henault	
2016	A Cure for Wellness	Pembroke	
2018	A Futile and Stupid Gesture	Harry Kenney	
2018	Delirium	Psychiatrist	
2023	Oppenheimer	Gale W. McGee	

=== Television ===
Year	Title	Role	Notes
1982	The Country Girl	Paul Unger	TV movie
1984	George Washington	Patrick Henry	Episode #1.1
1985	Kane & Abel	Lowell Kane	Episode #1.2
1985	Remington Steele	Preston Hayes	Episode: "Corn Fed Steele"
1987	St. Elsewhere	Klaus Brinkmann	Episode: "Schwarzwald"
1987	Jack and Mike	Johnson	Episode: "Dreamland"
1987	Leg Work	Steve Amati	Episode: "Life Itself"
1988	Spenser: For Hire	George Lynnwood	Episode: "Substantial Justice"
1988	Matlock	Rod Greenwood	Episode: "The Magician"
1988–1991	Dear John	Ralph Drang	68 episodes
1989	Studio 5-B	Unknown	Episode: "Pilot"
1990	Star Trek: The Next Generation	Tam Elbrun	Episode: "Tin Man"
1991	Quantum Leap	Detective Ward	Episode: "Permanent Wave - June 2, 1983"
1995	Law & Order	Terrence Dwyer	Episode: "Wannabe"
1996	Star Trek: Voyager	The Magistrate	Episode: "Sacred Ground"
1996	Caroline in the City	Henry	Episode: "Caroline and the Freight King"
1996–1997	Mad About You	Lance Brockwell	4 episodes
1997	Home Improvement	Fred	Episode: "Totally Tool Time"
1997	George and Leo	Unknown	Episode: "The Cameo Episode"
1997	Just Shoot Me!	Headmaster Reilly	Episode: "Twice Burned"
1997	Murphy Brown	Concert Master	Episode: "I Hear a Symphony"
1997–1998	Sleepwalkers	The Smiling Man	2 episodes
1998–2003	Buffy the Vampire Slayer	Mayor Richard Wilkins III	14 episodes
1998	Working	Alan Norman	Episode: "The Breakfast"
1998	Buddy Faro	Miles Marengo	Episode: "The Curse of the Faro"
1998	Cupid	Michael Bennett	Episode: "Heaven... He's in Heaven"
1999	Mercy Point	Stenneth Lock	2 episodes
1999	Family Law	Unknown	Episode: "Decisions"
2000	Profiler	Vincent Capobianco	Episode: "The Long Way Home"
2000	Time of Your Life	Alan	Episode: "The Time They Got E-Rotic"
2000	Charmed	Father Thomas	Episode: "Primrose Empath"
2000	Judging Amy	Mike Holcombe	Episode: "Dog Days"
2000	City of Angels	Unknown	Episode: "Saving Faces"
2000–2003	The West Wing	Secretary of Agriculture Roger Tribbey	2 episodes
2001	3rd Rock from the Sun	Dr. Breen	Episode: "Dick Digs"
2001	18 Wheels of Justice	Travis Jordan	Episode: "Slight of Mind"
2001	Boston Public	Mr. Jacobs	Episode: "Chapter Seventeen"
2001	King of the Hill	Dr. Tate / Larry (voice)	Episode: "Hank's Back Story"
2001	The Drew Carey Show	Dr. Hershlag	2 episodes
2001	The Day the World Ended	Sheriff Ken	TV movie
2001	The Guardian	Fulton Trout	Episode: "The Funnies"
2001	Dead Last	Dr. Casey Henderson	Episode: "To Live and Amulet Die"
2002	Malcolm in the Middle	Rudy	Episode: "Poker"
2002	Watching Ellie	Robert	Episode: "Tango"
2002	Roswell	Dr. Burton Weiss	Episode: "Who Died and Made You King?"
2002	Philly	Dabney Cooper	Episode: "Tall Tales"
2003	The Mayor	Dick Winterhalter	TV movie
2003–2006	Las Vegas	Chef Gunther	6 episodes
2004	I'm with Her	Principal Marvin Talbot	Episode: "Eight Simple Rules for Dating a Celebrity"
2004	Dr. Vegas	Hank Harold	2 episodes
2004	Less than Perfect	Dr. Lars Skaarsgard	Episode: "From the Chair to the Couch"
2004	Huff	Mr. Wayne	Episode: "Assault & Pepper"
2005	Monk	John Ricca	Episode: "Mr. Monk vs. the Cobra"
2005	Jack & Bobby	Adult Warren Feide	Episode: "Stand by Me"
2005	Star Trek: Enterprise	Nathan Samuels	2 episodes
2005	Medium	Joe's Boss	2 episodes
2006	The Bernie Mac Show	Dr. Lyons	Episode: "Exercise in Fertility: Part 2"
2006	Bones	Dr. Henry Atlas	Episode: "The Woman at the Airport"
2006–2013	How I Met Your Mother	Clint	3 episodes
2007	CSI: Crime Scene Investigation	Peyton Tallman	Episode: "Monster in the Box"
2009	Breaking Bad	Dr. Chavez	Episode: "Bit by a Dead Bee"
2010	Nolan Knows Best	Frenchy	TV movie
2011	Law & Order: LA	Attorney Spicer	Episode: "El Sereno"
2011	The Middle	Gene	Episode: "The Play"
2011	Once Upon a Time	Martin	Episode: "That Still Small Voice"
2012	Supernatural	Professor Morrison	Episode: "The Slice Girls"
2013	The Mentalist	Francisco Navarro	Episode: "Red Letter Day"
2014	Major Crimes	Mr. Kleiner	Episode: "Frozen Assets"
2015	Kittens in a Cage	Judge Dodd	Episode: "Ain't Even Got a Mustache"
2017	Ghosted	Stafford Yates	Episode: "The Machine"
2018	Young Sheldon	Elliot Douglas	Episode: "An Eagle Feather, a String Bean, and an Eskimo"
2018	Disjointed	Judge Nelson	2 episodes
2018	Criminal Minds	Leonard Hagland	Episode: "Ex Parte"
2018	Modern Family	Joel L.L. Logan	Episode: "Clash of Swords"
2018	The Rookie	Mr. Walker	Episode: "The Roundup"
2018	The Resident	Bartholomew McGainn	Episode: "The Dance"
2022	9-1-1: Lone Star	Joe	2 episodes
2023	White House Plumbers	Senator Philip Hart	Episode: "Please Destroy This, Huh?"

== Stage ==
Year	Title	Role(s)	Notes	Ref.
1976	The Best Man	Reporter		
1976	Who's Afraid of Virginia Woolf?	Nick		
1978	Much Ado About Nothing	Benedick		
1978	Journey's End	Raleigh		
1979	Oklahoma!	Will Parker	Broadway debut	
1981	Oh, Brother!	Western Mousada	Broadway	
1982	Is There Life After High School?	Performer	Broadway	
1982	Cats	Munkustrap	Broadway	
1985	Harrigan 'N Hart	Edward Harrigan	Broadway	
1985	Sunday in the Park with George	Georges Seurat / George	Broadway	
1987	Sleight of Hand	Paul	Broadway	
1988	Eastern Standard	Stephen Wheeler		
1989	Sunday in the Park with George	Georges Seurat / George		
1991	You Never Know	Baron Rommer		
1992	Crazy for You	Bobby Child	Broadway	
1995	Twelve Dreams	Charles Hatrick		
1995	Picasso at the Lapin Agile	Freddy		
1996	Arms and the Man	Captain Bluntschli		
1999	If Love Were All	Noël Coward		
2001	Twelfth Night	Feste		
2002	Imaginary Friends	The Man	Broadway	
2004	The Bear	Grigory Stepanovitch Smirnov		
2005	Pera Palas	Adalet / Bedia Older / Orhan Older		
2006	Spamalot	King Arthur	Broadway	
2006	The Best Little Whorehouse in Texas	Governor	Broadway	
2007	Regrets Only	Hank		
2009	The Fantasticks	Bellomy		
2009	Putting It Together	Performer		
2009	Equivocation	Richard		
2010	King Lear	Lear		
2010	The Train Driver	Roelf Visagie		
2011	The Madness of George III	King George III		
2012	March	William Tecumseh Sherman		
2012	The Exorcist	Burke Dennings		
2012	Appomattox	Lincoln / Johnson		
2013	Cyrano de Bergerac	Cyrano de Bergerac	Chicago Shakespeare Theater	
2014	Love, Noël: The Letters and Songs of Noël Coward	Noël Coward		
2015	The Second Mrs. Wilson	Col. Edward House		
2015	Uncle Vanya	Serebryakov		
2016	Vicuña	Kurt Seaman		
2017	Cat on a Hot Tin Roof	Big Daddy		
2018	Henry IV	Northumberland		
2018	Three Days in the Country	Shpigelsky		
2019	Indecent	Actor		
2019	Skintight	Elliot Isaac		
2022	Everybody	Somebody		
2023	Water for Elephants	Mr. Jankowski		

== Awards and nominations ==
Year	Award	Category	Work	Result
1980	Theatre World Award	Outstanding Stage Debut	Oklahoma!	Won
1980	Tony Award	Best Featured Actor in a Musical	Oklahoma!	Nominated
1980	Drama Desk Award	Outstanding Featured Actor in A Musical	Oklahoma!	Nominated
1983	Tony Award	Best Featured Actor in a Musical	Cats	Nominated
1985	Drama Desk Award	Outstanding Actor in A Musical	Harrigan 'N Hart	Nominated
1992	Tony Award	Best Actor in a Musical	Crazy for You	Nominated
1992	Outer Critics Circle Award	Outstanding Actor in a Musical	Crazy for You	Nominated
2010	Ovation Awards	Featured Actor in a Play	Equivocation	Won
2010	Los Angeles Drama Critics Circle Award	Lead Performance	King Lear	Won
2011	Joseph Jefferson Award	Actor in a Principal Role - Play	The Madness of George III	Won
2012	Joseph Jefferson Award	Actor in a Supporting Role - Play	The March	Nominated
2014	Joseph Jefferson Award	Actor in a Principal Role - Play	Cyrano de Bergerac	Nominated
2018	Ovation Awards	Lead Actor in a Play	Cat on a Hot Tin Roof	Won
2018	Los Angeles Drama Critics Circle Award	Featured Performance	Cat on a Hot Tin Roof	Won

Preceded by Simon Russell Beale; December 21, 2005 - April 26, 2006	Actor playing King Arthur in Spamalot on Broadway; April 27, 2006 - October 31, 2006	Succeeded by Jonathan Hadary; October 31, 2006 - June 5, 2008
