= Annie Yeamans =

American actress (1835-1912)

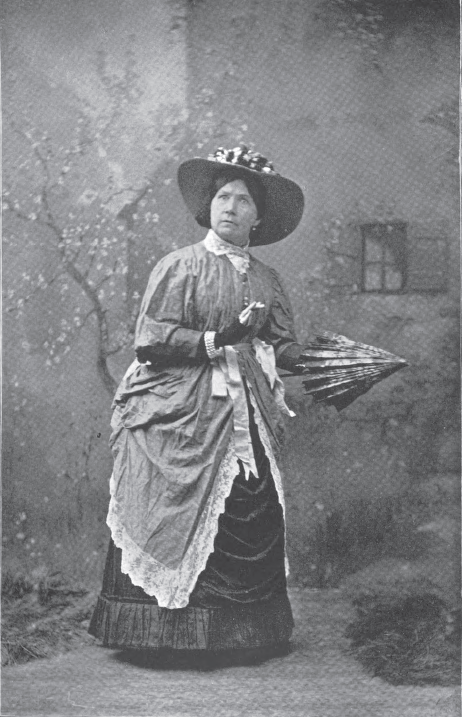
- Actress Annie Yeamans, c. 1896
- Born: 19 November 1835; Isle of Man, United Kingdom
- Died: 3 March 1912 (aged 76)
- Occupation: Travelling Performer
- Spouse: Edward Yeamans
- Children: 3 including Lydia and Jennie

Annie Griffiths Yeamans (November 19, 1835 – March 3, 1912) was a 19th-century character actress, appearing in many Harrigan and Hart productions.

== Biography ==
Yeamans was born on the Isle of Man on November 19 1835, moving as a young child to Australia to start her theatrical career in 1845.

== Performer ==
Yeaman was a known performer, who worked in the United States and Australia chiefly. She worked first as bareback rider in the circus in Australia and married her husband Edward "Ned" Yeamans, (an American clown), touring in Asia together. Her first acting role was in 1868 'playing Cinderella at the old New York Theatre'.

She visited the United States in 1865, and briefly in Yokohama in Japan, where she was joined by Willie Edouin in 1866. In San Francisco in the late 1860's she became a widow, travelling to New York with her children, where she performed alongside G.L.Fox, playing Aunt Ophelia in 1877 in Uncle Tom's Cabin; being best noted for role as Cordelia in the Edward Harrigan play. Yeaman last acted in Vaudeville in 1907, noting of her retirement that 'as she is a woman of spirit and self-respect who, as she is capable of earning her way, prefers that independent course [of retirement.]' During her time acting, she worked with Albert Marshman Palmer, Augustin Daly, Sydney Rosenfeld and Sadie Martinot in American productions.

Her daughters Lydia Yeamans Titus and Jennie Yeamans, were both singers and actresses as well.
