= David Braham =

David Braham (c.1834 – April 11, 1905) was a London-born musical theatre composer, most famous for his work with his son-in-law Edward Harrigan (1844-1911), and Tony Hart (1855-1891). He has been called "the American Offenbach".

== Early life (1834–1873) ==
David Braham was born in London in 1834. As a young man, he aspired to become a professional musician and began studying the harp. However, because he was unable to get his bulky instrument on board a stagecoach, he later switched to the violin. He proved to be an adept violinist, performing in concerts at a young age. He was the uncle of John Joseph Braham Sr.

The Braham family immigrated to New York City when David was 15. Upon arriving in New York, Braham began working as a violinist in the orchestra accompanying the Pony Moore Minstrels. He played in the pit orchestras of various New York auditoriums, headed an 18-piece orchestra at the New Canterbury concert saloon at 585 Broadway, and led a military band.

The first Broadway musical to feature music by David Braham was Pluto, produced by William Horace Lingard at the Theatre Comique in 1869. Braham's success as a composer continued through the early 1870s, during which time he wrote numbers for such performers as James McKee, then-child star Annie Yeamans, and P. T. Barnum performer General Tom Thumb.

== Harrigan and Hart (1873–1885) ==
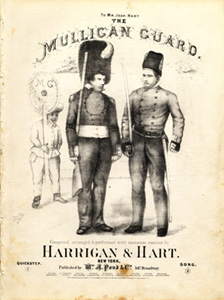
Poster advertising The Mulligan Guard

In 1873, David Braham collaborated with Edward Harrigan and Tony Hart on the song The Mulligan Guard, with music by Braham and lyrics by Harrigan. The song was presented on July 15, 1873 as part of a vaudeville sketch which featured Harrigan and Hart wearing unusual American Civil War-era military costumes.

This collaboration marked the first of many between Braham, Harrigan, and Hart. From that point onwards, Braham became firmly associated with the two. Although he did go on to write melodies for other lyricists, his success in Broadway theater came almost entirely as a result of his Harrigan and Hart scores. In November 1876, Harrigan married Braham's daughter Annie.

The success of The Mulligan Guard led to a series of burlesques which would become known as the "Mulligan plays". The Mulligan plays focused on the everyday life of New York City, appealing to a variety of racial groups, including Irish Americans, German Americans, and African Americans.

The first of these Mulligan plays was The Mulligan Guard's Ball, followed by The Mulligan Guard's Picnic, The Mulligan Guard's Chowder, The Mulligan Guard's Christmas, and various others.

Although most of the Mulligan plays followed the same naming pattern, the final two shows in the series were titled Cordelia's Aspirations and Dan's Tribulations. The Mulligan plays featured several popular songs, all of which were written by Braham, including The Pitcher of Beer and Hats Off to Me.

== Late life (1884–1905) ==
The last Mulligan play to be produced was Dan's Tribulations on April 7, 1884. Shortly after it opened, the New Theatre Comique, at which many of the Harrigan and Hart shows had been produced, burned down. In 1885, Harrigan and Hart separated, and neither they nor Braham were ever able to singularly attain the same level of success that they had achieved as a team.

David Braham died in 1905. On May 21, 1906, Harrigan produced a revival of Old Lavender, a musical he and Braham had written together. In 1985, a musical, Harrigan 'n Hart, was produced at the Longacre Theatre, featuring songs by Harrigan and Braham.
