= Edward Harrigan =

American actor and playwright

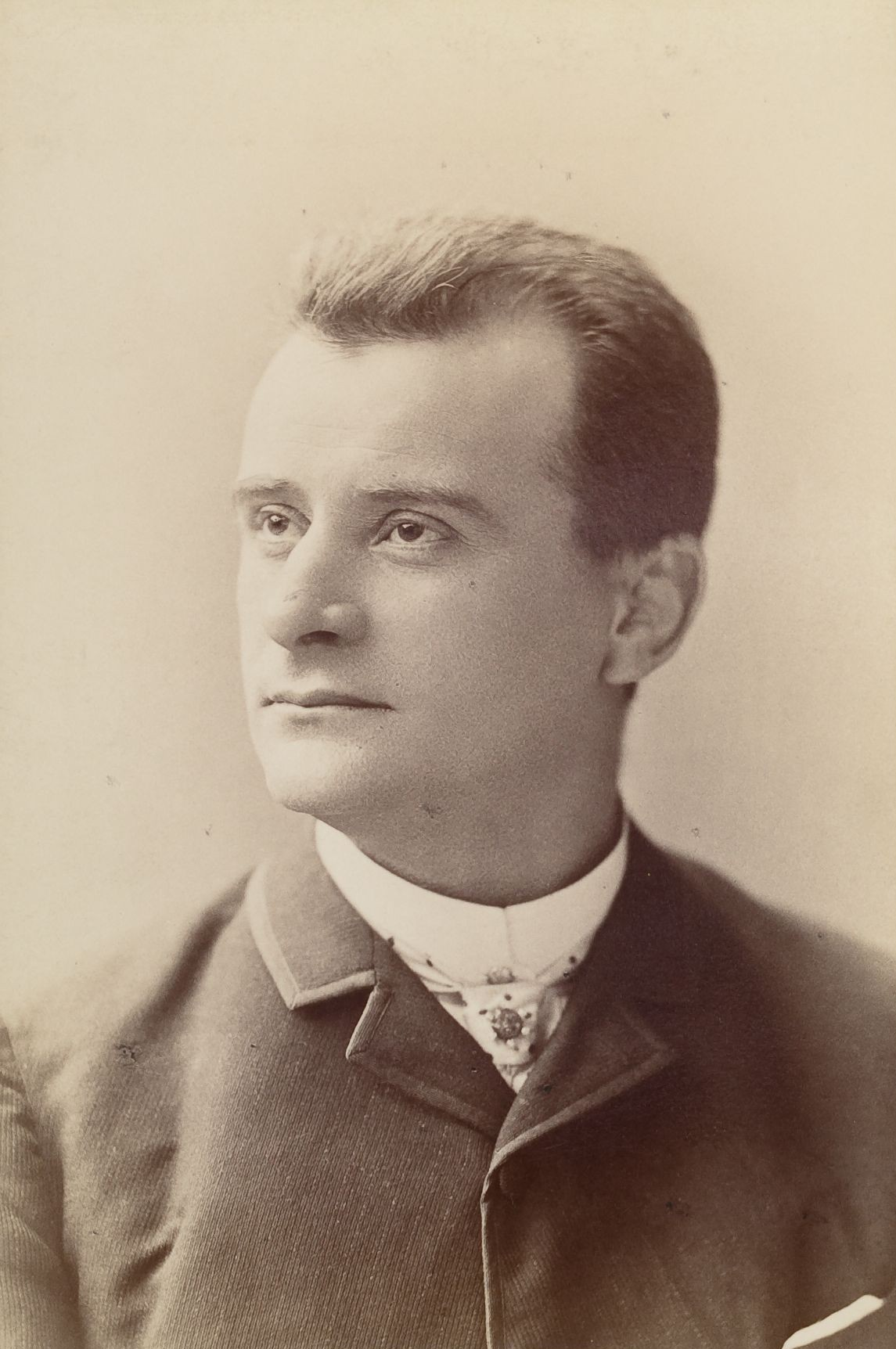
Ed Harrigan

Edward Harrigan (October 26, 1844 – June 6, 1911) was an Irish-American actor, singer, dancer, playwright, lyricist and theater producer who, together with Tony Hart (as Harrigan & Hart), formed one of the most celebrated theatrical partnerships of the 19th century. His career began in minstrelsy and variety but progressed to the production of multi-act plays full of singing, dancing and physical comedy, making Harrigan one of the founding fathers of modern American musical theatre.

== Early years ==
Harrigan was born at Corlear's Hook in Lower Manhattan, New York City. He was one of 13 children, only four of whom lived past infancy. Their father, William Harrington was a shipyard worker from Newfoundland, and their mother, Ellenn Ann née Rogers, was from Charlestown, Massachusetts; both were Protestants.

After Harrigan's parents divorced when he was 18, he worked at caulking ships, and his work eventually took him to San Francisco. As a pastime, he wrote new lyrics to existing melodies, and the result found popularity with his fellow workers.

== Harrigan and Hart partnership ==
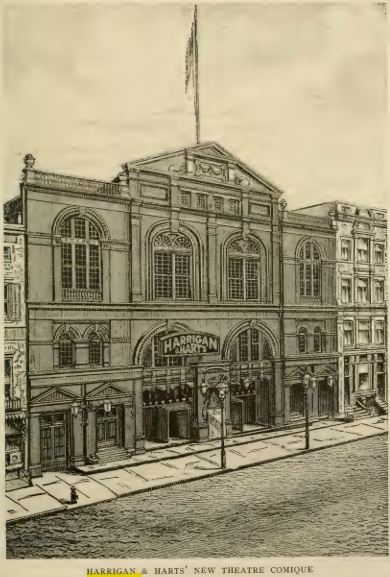
Harrigan & Hart's New Theatre Comique

Harrigan made his first stage appearance in 1867 at the Olympic, a San Francisco "melodeon", as that city's variety theaters were then known. A brief partnership with comic Sam Rickey was followed by a fourteen-year stage career with Tony Hart, whom he met in Chicago in 1870. Although Harrigan wrote the lyrics and stage patter, the diminutive Hart's charm and singing talent played a large role in the duo's success.

Harrigan and Hart went in 1871 to Boston, where they had their first big success at John Stetson's Howard Athenaeum. They then moved on to New York, where they first worked with Tony Pastor before beginning a long run at Josh Hart's Theatre Comique. By the mid-1870s they began moving from the variety show toward musical theatre. Harrigan's sketches on the Comique's crowded bill featured comic Irish, German and Black characters drawn from everyday life on the streets of New York. Their breakthrough hit was the 1873 song and sketch "The Mulligan Guard", a lampoon of an Irish neighborhood "militia" with music by David Braham, who would become Harrigan's musical director and father in law. It became their signature piece, and they featured it in many of their slapstick skits and plays. In 1876, Harrigan took over the Comique himself, along with Hart and manager Martin Hanley.

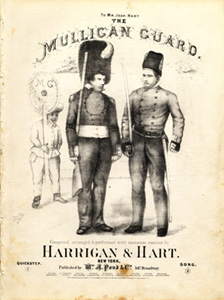

By 1878, with The Mulligan Guard Picnic, Harrigan & Hart settled down on Broadway and performed in seventeen of their shows over the next seven years. Though still broad and farcical, these shows featured music that was integrated with a more literary story line, together with the dialogue and dance, and the shows began to resemble modern musical comedy. Harrigan wrote the stories and lyrics, and Braham wrote the music.

Although the plays gradually became longer as more songs, dances, and stage business was added, the tickets remained the same price. Harrigan and Hart's comedy was about everyday people, and so it was fitting that working folk were able to afford to fill up the seats. These shows were very popular, especially with New York's immigrant-based lower and middle classes, who were delighted to see themselves comically (but sympathetically) depicted on stage. The action of the plays took place in downtown Manhattan and concerned real-life problems, such as interracial tensions, political corruption, and gang violence, all mixed with broad, street-smart comedy, puns and ethnic dialects. Harrigan played the politically ambitious Irish saloon owner "Dan Mulligan", and Hart played the African-American washerwoman "Rebecca Allup".

One of Harrigan's most popular plays with the Mulligan Guard Series, the Mulligan Guard's Ball (1880), shows off the smooth juxtaposition of the comedy, musicality, and a healthy dose of humanity that made Harrigan's plays so distinctive. Full of laughable chaos and "Harrigan hilarity", the Irish militia and Black militia within the act butt heads in a satirical whirlwind of dance, stage violence, and buffoonery. The New York Herald compared the Mulligan series to the Pickwick Papers by Charles Dickens, and one devotee wrote: "America has produced nothing more national, more distinctly its own, than these plays of the Irish in New York". People spoke of Ned Harrigan as the American Molière.

Although the Theatre Comique was eventually shut down for financial reasons, Harrigan announced in 1881 that they would build a fresh and elegant "New Theatre Comique" several blocks further north on Broadway. The building they renovated was originally the home of the Church of the Messiah but had hosted many other theatres throughout the years. However, this theatre was not to last; it burned to the ground in 1884.

== Marriage and decline ==
After the theatre collapsed, so did the partnership. Harrigan had married Annie Braham, David's daughter, on November 18, 1876. Their family continued in his footsteps, as son William Harrigan, daughter Nedda Harrigan, and granddaughter Ann Connolly all became Broadway performers. However, Harrigan's habit of hiring relatives soured his partnership with Hart. In May 1885, five months after the fire, Harrigan and Hart appeared on Broadway together for the last time. Hart's health deteriorated, and he died at age 36 in 1891.

After splitting with Hart, Harrigan formed a partnership with Dan Collyer in 1885. It lasted for five years, and together they performed in many productions at Broadway's Park Theatre on Herald Square. The theatre was rebranded Harrigan's Theatre in 1890. Twenty-three of his plays achieved runs of more than 100 performances each on Broadway. Harrigan continued writing plays and performing until his last public appearance on March 16, 1910.

Harrigan died in 1911.

== Harrigan 'N Hart ==
In 1985, a musical celebrating the partnership, Harrigan 'N Hart, opened on Broadway. The show has a book by Michael Stewart, lyrics by Peter Walker, and music by Max Showalter is based on the book The Merry Partners by Ely Jacques Kahn, Jr. and material found by Nedda Harrigan Logan. Harry Groener portrayed Harrigan, Mark Hamill played Hart, and Joe Layton directed. Frank Rich of The New York Times found the show dull and "aimless", and it closed after 25 previews and four regular performances.

== Works ==
- 1877: Old Lavender
- 1878: The Mulligan Guard Picnic
- 1879: The Mulligan Guards' Ball
- 1880: The Mulligan Guards' Surprise which included the hit song "Whist! The Bogie Man" words by Harrigan and music by David Braham.
- 1881: The Major
- 1882: Squatter Sovereignty
- 1883: The Mulligans' Silver Wedding
- 1883: Cordelia's Aspirations
- 1886: The Leather Patch
- 1888: Waddy Googan
- 1890: Reilly and the Four Hundred
