= Angel season 4 =

Angel
- Season 4
- Region 1 Season 4 DVD cover
- Showrunner: Joss Whedon
- Starring: David Boreanaz; Charisma Carpenter; J. August Richards; Amy Acker; Vincent Kartheiser; Andy Hallett; Alexis Denisof
- No. of episodes: 22

Release
- Original network: The WB
- Original release: October 6, 2002 – May 7, 2003

Season chronology
- ← Previous; Season 3 Next → Season 5

The fourth season of the television series Angel, the spin-off of Buffy the Vampire Slayer, premiered on October 6, 2002, on The WB and concluded its 22-episode season on May 7, 2003. The season aired in a new timeslot, Sundays at 9:00 pm ET, and then relocated to Wednesdays at 9:00 pm ET, beginning with "Habeas Corpses".

== Cast and characters ==
=== Main cast ===
- David Boreanaz as Angel
- Charisma Carpenter as Cordelia Chase
- J. August Richards as Charles Gunn
- Amy Acker as Winifred "Fred" Burkle
- Vincent Kartheiser as Connor
- Andy Hallett as Lorne
- Alexis Denisof as Wesley Wyndam-Pryce

=== Recurring cast ===
- Stephanie Romanov as Lilah Morgan
- Vladimir Kulich as The Beast
- Gina Torres as Jasmine
- Alexa Davalos as Gwen Raiden
- Eliza Dushku as Faith
- Daniel Dae Kim as Gavin Park

=== Guest cast ===
- Julie Benz as Darla
- David Denman as Skip
- Alyson Hannigan as Willow Rosenberg
- Laurel Holloman as Justine Cooper
- John Rubinstein as Linwood Murrow
- Jonathan M. Woodward as Knox

== Crew ==
Series creator Joss Whedon remained as the sole executive producer of the show after David Greenwalt left at the end of season three to produce the ABC series Miracles after his contract with 20th Century Fox was up. He stayed on as a consulting producer for the remainder of the series. At the start of the season, David Simkins was made showrunner and executive producer, but after three months, he left the show due to "creative differences" and is not credited in any episodes. Jeffrey Bell was promoted to co-executive producer and assumed the role of showrunner for the season. Tim Minear also left the series to run Whedon's new series Firefly but, like Greenwalt, stayed on as a consulting producer, and wrote and directed the season finale "Home". Whedon would write and direct only one episode of the season, "Spin the Bottle", because of his commitments to the first season of Firefly and the final season of Buffy the Vampire Slayer.

Steven S. DeKnight, who had written for Buffy during seasons five and six, moved over to Angel where he stayed for the remainder of the show's run. He wrote or co-wrote six episodes of the season, including the season premiere and also directed his debut episode; "Inside Out". Buffy writer-producer David Fury joined as a consulting producer (taking over Marti Noxon's role) and ended up writing four episodes. Mere Smith was promoted to executive story editor and wrote or co-wrote four episodes. Elizabeth Craft and Sarah Fain joined the show as staff writers and wrote or co-wrote five episodes. Firefly writer Ben Edlund was hired as a producer towards the end of the season, following the cancellation of Firefly.

== Episodes ==
No. overall	No. in season	Title	Directed by	Written by	Original release date	Prod. code	U.S. viewers (millions)
67	1	"Deep Down"	Terrence O'Hara	Steven S. DeKnight	October 6, 2002	4ADH01	4.57
Angel is trapped on the ocean floor and Cordelia is stuck on a mystical plane. Wesley searches independently for them as well as Fred and Gunn.
68	2	"Ground State"	Michael Grossman	Mere Smith	October 13, 2002	4ADH02	4.21
Angel, Fred and Gunn break into an auction house to get an object that may locate Cordelia, but a cat burglar named Gwen, who possesses the power to control electricity, targets the same relic.
69	3	"The House Always Wins"	Marita Grabiak	David Fury	October 20, 2002	4ADH03	5.06
Angel decides to take Gunn and Fred on a road trip to Vegas to visit Lorne, who is being blackmailed to help a manager steal people's destinies.
70	4	"Slouching Toward Bethlehem"	Skip Schoolnik	Jeffrey Bell	October 27, 2002	4ADH04	4.13
Cordelia returns but has no memory of who she is. Connor saves her from a demon and she decides to stay with him.
71	5	"Supersymmetry"	Bill L. Norton	Elizabeth Craft & Sarah Fain	November 3, 2002	4ADH05	3.64
Fred's article is published and she's invited to speak at a symposium where a portal opens.
72	6	"Spin the Bottle"	Joss Whedon	Joss Whedon	November 10, 2002	4ADH06	3.63
Lorne attempts a spell on Cordelia to restore her memory, which results in the gang reverting to their memories as teenagers.
73	7	"Apocalypse, Nowish"	Vern Gillum	Steven S. DeKnight	November 17, 2002	4ADH07	4.25
Cordelia's apocalyptic nightmares become a reality as a powerful demon emerges in L.A.
74	8	"Habeas Corpses"	Skip Schoolnik	Jeffrey Bell	January 15, 2003	4ADH08	4.01
Angel learns that Connor is trapped in Wolfram and Hart, which is under attack from the Beast.
75	9	"Long Day's Journey"	Terrence O'Hara	Mere Smith	January 22, 2003	4ADH09	3.46
The gang learns that the answer to stopping The Beast is "among them", they suspect Connor. Meanwhile, Gwen returns, and the gang learns that the Beast intends to blot out the sun.
76	10	"Awakening"	James A. Contner	David Fury & Steven S. DeKnight	January 29, 2003	4ADH10	3.19
In an attempt to locate The Beast and restore the sun, Wesley brings in a dark mystic to extract Angel's soul.
77	11	"Soulless"	Sean Astin	Elizabeth Craft & Sarah Fain	February 5, 2003	4ADH11	3.46
Angelus is interrogated by Wesley and co as they attempt to find out how to kill The Beast.
78	12	"Calvary"	Bill L. Norton	Jeffrey Bell & Steven S. DeKnight & Mere Smith	February 12, 2003	4ADH12	3.69
The gang discover The Beast is working for a much more powerful Master, who is far closer to home than they realize.
79	13	"Salvage"	Jefferson Kibbee	David Fury	March 5, 2003	4ADH13	3.72
Wesley releases Faith from prison to help capture Angelus, who is himself going after the Beast.
80	14	"Release"	James A. Contner	Steven S. DeKnight & Elizabeth Craft & Sarah Fain	March 12, 2003	4ADH14	3.91
Angelus continues his search for the Beast's Master as Faith attempts to find a way to contain Angelus.
81	15	"Orpheus"	Terrence O'Hara	Mere Smith	March 19, 2003	4ADH15	3.60
Willow is called in to restore Angel's soul. Meanwhile, while in their comas, Angelus and Faith experience flashbacks of Angel's good deeds over the centuries, culminating in a mental showdown between Angel and Angelus.
82	16	"Players"	Michael Grossman	Jeffrey Bell & Elizabeth Craft & Sarah Fain	March 26, 2003	4ADH16	3.45
Gwen enlists Gunn's help to steal a device to control her abilities while Lorne attempts a ritual to restore his empathic powers.
83	17	"Inside Out"	Steven S. DeKnight	Steven S. DeKnight	April 2, 2003	4ADH17	3.55
The gang learns of a higher being's plan to give birth to itself through Cordelia, and Connor receives a visit from the spirit of his deceased mother, Darla.
84	18	"Shiny Happy People"	Marita Grabiak	Elizabeth Craft & Sarah Fain	April 9, 2003	4ADH18	3.92
As Cordelia lies in a coma following her demonic delivery, the rest of the gang becomes acquainted with—and enchanted by—her unexpected offspring, Jasmine.
85	19	"The Magic Bullet"	Jeffrey Bell	Jeffrey Bell	April 16, 2003	4ADH19	4.09
After discovering the secret to breaking Jasmine's spell over the nation's citizens, Fred must find a way to save the others before she's captured and killed.
86	20	"Sacrifice"	David Straiton	Ben Edlund	April 23, 2003	4ADH20	3.71
Free from Jasmine's spell, Angel and the gang escape into the sewers for protection, where Wesley discovers an insect-like demon that may hold the key to defeating Jasmine.
87	21	"Peace Out"	Jefferson Kibbee	David Fury	April 30, 2003	4ADH21	4.04
Connor goes in search of the missing Cordelia, while Angel travels to another dimension in search of Jasmine's true name.
88	22	"Home"	Tim Minear	Tim Minear	May 7, 2003	4ADH22	3.95
With Jasmine defeated, Angel and the gang are made an offer they can't refuse from Wolfram & Hart, and Connor goes over the edge into madness.

== Reception ==
The fourth season was nominated for five Saturn Awards – Best Network Television Series, Best Actress in a Television Series (Charisma Carpenter), Best Supporting Actor in a Television Series (Alexis Denisof), Best Supporting Actress in a Television Series (Amy Acker), and David Boreanaz won for Best Actor in a Television Series. The season was also nominated for four Satellite Awards – David Boreanaz for Best Actor – Television Series Drama, Andy Hallett for Best Supporting Actor – Television Series Drama, and Amy Acker and Gina Torres both for Best Supporting Actress – Television Series Drama.

The Futon Critic named "Spin the Bottle" the 33rd best episode of 2002 and "Peace Out" the 25th best episode of 2003.

The fourth season averaged 3.7 million viewers, slightly lower than the seventh and final season of Buffy.

== DVD release ==
Angel: The Complete Fourth Season was released on DVD in region 1 on September 7, 2004 and in region 2 on April 1, 2004. The DVD includes all 22 episodes on 6 discs presented in anamorphic widescreen 1.78:1 aspect ratio. Special features on the DVD include seven commentary tracks—"The House Always Wins" by writer David Fury and actor Andy Hallett; "Spin the Bottle" by writer/director Joss Whedon and actor Alexis Denisof; "Apocalypse, Nowish" by writer Steven S. DeKnight and director Vern Gillum; "Orpheus" by co-executive producer Jeffrey Bell and director Terrence O'Hara; "Inside Out" by writer/director Steven S. DeKnight; "The Magic Bullet" by writer/director Jeffrey Bell; and "Home" by writer/director Tim Minear. Featurettes include, "Angel and the Apocalypse", which details how they depicted the apocalypse on the show; "Unplugged: Season 4 Outtakes", a series of outtakes from the season; "Last Looks: The Hyperion Hotel", a set tour of the Hyperion Hotel; "Fatal Beauty and the Beast", a look at the villains of the season; "Malice in Wonderland: Wolfram & Hart", a look at the law firm and its importance in the show; and "Prophecies: Season 4 Overview", a summary of the season featuring interviews with cast and crew members.
