= Apocalypse, Nowish =

- Angel episode
- Episode no.: Season 4 Episode 7
- Directed by: Vern Gillum
- Written by: Steven S. DeKnight
- Production code: 4ADH07
- Original air date: November 17, 2002

Guest appearances
- Andy Hallett as Lorne; Stephanie Romanov as Lilah Morgan; Daniel Dae Kim as Gavin Park; Vladimir Kulich as The Beast; Tina Morasco as Mrs. Pritchard; Molly Weber as Waitress

Episode chronology
← Previous "Spin the Bottle"	Next → "Habeas Corpses"
- Angel season 4

"Apocalypse, Nowish" is seventh episode of the fourth season of the American television series Angel. Written by Steven S. DeKnight and directed by Vern Gillum, it was originally broadcast on November 17, 2002, on the WB network. The WB referred to this episode as "Rain of Fire" when it was first aired, which DeKnight attributes to "legal issues" over the title's reference to the 1979 film Apocalypse Now.

In "Apocalypse, Nowish", Angel Investigations deals with a sudden wave of paranormal activity all over Los Angeles, portending the rise of the apocalyptic beast of whom Cordelia has been experiencing visions. As the Beast rises from the bowels of the Earth to bring a rain of fire over the city, Cordelia and Connor have sex.

== Plot ==
Cordelia tells Angel that she still loves him, but that during her time as a higher power she saw and felt all the carnage he formerly wrought as Angelus. She now needs him to give her time to sort out her feelings. When Lorne wants to learn what Cordelia remembers about her time as a higher power, Angel insists that they wait.

Connor comforts Cordelia after another nightmare featuring the demon from her visions. Meanwhile, as Angel Investigations is flooded with calls involving paranormal activity all over Los Angeles, Wesley returns home after fighting a bug infestation to find Lilah dressed as Fred for sexual role-playing.

Suddenly, Cordelia starts breathing hard and her eyes turn white as she warns Angel that "he's coming." Cordelia lies down and tells Angel and Connor what she remembers of her vision. Back at the hotel, Lorne picks up on the strained relationship between Fred and Gunn; since they jointly sought revenge on the man who sent Fred to a hell dimension, Fred has not been able to forgive Gunn for their actions. She leaves for the diner where she and Gunn are regulars.

Angel goes to Wolfram & Hart to demand that Lilah return the information the law firm sucked out of Lorne's head about the impending apocalypse. Cordelia and Connor walk to an alleyway that Cordelia recognizes as the place where Connor was born, where Darla staked herself. A large, horned demon bursts from the ground before them, knocking them both down. Connor attacks, but he takes a brutal beating before the demon strides away. Cordelia tends to Connor's wounds and finds that he has broken ribs.

At the diner, a waitress tries to advise Fred on her relationship troubles, until an earthquake shatters the diner's windows. Meanwhile, unable to locate Fred, Gunn is restless and tries to leave to find her, but Wesley appears and interrupts his departure. Aware of all the strange occurrences around town, he offers to work with them to deal with this problem, but Gunn's too angry with Wesley to even consider the idea. Angel stops them all from leaving because he has information from Lilah that they must study to prevent the end of the world. The trio examine the pages containing information stolen earlier from Lorne's brain. Another call is taken by Lorne and Angel instructs him to start mapping the locations from where the calls originate. The pages make no sense until Gunn sees that the pages fit together like a puzzle. Rearranging the sheets reveals a symbol shaped like a square with an "X" inside representing the "Eye of Fire." Lorne makes another discovery: the mapped locations of strange occurrences form the same pattern. Angel and the gang determine that the location on the map that appears at the middle of the X is a popular club on a high rooftop. They arrive at the club to find a mass of dead bodies and the Beast waiting for them.

Angel and the team take on the demon but are overpowered. Crossbows, axes, and swords don't have much impact, so Wesley tries a series of guns that also fail. Angel renews the battle and manages to send the demon to its knees, until the demon stakes him in the neck. The demon sends Angel flying off the roof to the city street. The demon forms the Eye of Fire using the dead bodies and sets them ablaze. Angel rips the stake from his neck and slowly begins to recover.

The fire on the roof rises towards the sky and soon fire starts to rain down as Connor and Cordelia watch. Connor blames himself for the whole situation, but Cordelia comforts and reassures him that he's not to blame. Cordelia kisses Connor and offers him the chance to feel something real. While everyone else watches the fire, fearing the future that awaits them, Connor and Cordelia have sex. Connor is seeking comfort in her arms. Angel is shown to be observing through the window on top of a nearby building.

== Production ==
Executive producer Jeffrey Jackson Bell employed the effects shop Almost Human to design Vladimir Kulich's costuming and make-up. Almost Human makeup designer Chris Burdett says it took 2–3 days for four people to sculpt the costume and another 7 hours to fill and shape the huge fiberglass mold; a life cast was made of Kulich so that the suit would fit him exactly. The night before shooting was to begin, the crew finally established the costume's paint scheme. Kulich went through an eight-hour make-up process to transform him into the character of the Beast, including prosthetics and fiberglass body suit, but "The worst part was the contact lenses...[that] cover the entire eyeball," the actor said. However, the isolating nature of the 50 lb costume meant that "I was able to search a little deeper for material while I was in the character because I was cocooned off...It was liberating." Writer Steven S. DeKnight says all the full-suit shots of the Beast feature stunt double Scott Workman. They cut to Kulich only for the close-ups.

According to director Vern Gillum, "J. August Richards is terrified by rats, just like his character. This is the nicest guy in the world and it was just torment for him beyond anything you could imagine." In the final fight scene, which took two full days to film, Charisma Carpenter had to be careful doing her stunts, as she was pregnant.

== Reception ==
Writer Steven DeKnight says, "One of the biggest things this year has been the reaction to "Apocalypse, Nowish." Everybody loved the show, basically giving it five stars then taking three away because of the very end." When fans speculated why Cordelia would sleep with Angel's son, DeKnight cautions, "There is a bigger reason for it that will become apparent as well... You have to remember it's a long story arc." Many people were disturbed that Cordelia had sex with Connor, and Charisma Carpenter agrees: "I hear a lot of "ewwww," and I agree. It is ewwwy. Only something deplorable and devilish and truly evil could do something so horrid."
