= Release (Angel) =

- Angel episode
- Episode no.: Season 4 Episode 14
- Directed by: James A. Contner
- Written by: Steven S. DeKnight; Elizabeth Craft; Sarah Fain
- Production code: 4ADH14
- Original air date: March 12, 2003

Guest appearances
- Eliza Dushku as Faith; Christopher Neiman as Frotor Demon; Darren Laverty as Lackey Vamp #1; Sam Stefanski as Lackey Vamp #2; Catalina Larranaga as Vamp Waitress; Peter Renaday as Master's Voice; Becka Linder as Drugged Girl #1; Chris Huse as Drugged Vamp #2; Ian Anthony Dale as Drugged Vamp #3; Randall Rapstine as Reg; Andrew McGinnis as Mullet Head Vamp

Episode chronology
← Previous "Salvage"	Next → "Orpheus"
- Angel season 4

"Release" is the 14th episode of the fourth season of the American television series Angel.

== Plot ==
As a battered and bloodied Faith recovers at Wesley's apartment after her showdown with the Beast, they wonder why Angelus would suddenly kill the Beast and allow the sun to return to Los Angeles. At a demon bar, Angelus is spoken to by a deep disembodied voice, which turns out to originate from Cordelia, projecting from the hotel. Angelus then surprises Fred at the hotel, claiming he is immune to the sanctuary spell. He demands information on the Beast's master and steals her research materials. Fred tries to shoot him with a tranquilizer dart but accidentally hits Lorne instead. Connor attempts to stop Angelus, but is repelled by the demon protection spell.

Angelus is contacted again by Cordelia telepathically, and this time she threatens to restore his soul if he refuses to help. Fred's mood worsens as she feels inadequate to fight Angelus. Fred and Gunn kiss, but part, unsure about their feelings. Meanwhile, Cordelia convinces Connor to keep her sudden pregnancy a secret from everyone else. Faith and Wesley try to track Angelus at the demon bar. There they encounter human junkies, who get high on the vampire bites. Faith smacks one around, but Wesley finally gets the needed info by stabbing the woman. They are able to track Angelus to a deserted museum where Faith has another showdown with him. The fight is long and brutal, with Faith eventually seeming to have beaten Angelus into submission - only to have him suddenly leap on her and bite her neck.

== Cast ==
After over 40 guest appearances, Andy Hallett joins the regular cast and is now billed in the opening credits.

== Reception ==
AV Club, in a dual review of this episode and the previous episode Salvage, said, "On the whole, I’d call these two episodes a mixed bag: some poignant thematic development undercut a little by a surplus of plot and an overemphasis on the characters’ self-pity."
