= Inside Out (Angel) =

- Angel episode
- Episode no.: Season 4 Episode 17
- Directed by: Steven S. DeKnight
- Written by: Steven S. DeKnight
- Production code: 4ADH17
- Original air date: April 2, 2003

Guest appearances
- Julie Benz as Darla; Gina Torres as Jasmine; David Denman as Skip; Stephi Lineburg as Girl

Episode chronology
← Previous "Players"	Next → "Shiny Happy People"
- Angel season 4

"Inside Out" is the 17th episode of the fourth season of the American television series Angel. Written and directed by Steven S. DeKnight, it was originally broadcast on April 2, 2003 on the WB network. Angel roughs up the demon guide Skip to find out why Cordelia has turned evil. Skip tells them a higher being has manipulated events over the past few years to cause itself to be reborn. Meanwhile, Cordelia convinces Connor to mystically expedite the birth using the blood of a virgin. Angel arrives in time to stop him, but hesitates, and Cordelia gives birth to a full grown woman.

== Production details ==
The costume for Skip took three and a half hours to put on, and required an additional five hours of makeup. Although David Denman (Skip) hated the process, he was "surprised and very excited" after learning that Skip was actually a villain.

Julie Benz reprised her role as Darla, in her first and only scene with Vincent Kartheiser, who plays her character's son, Connor. "I loved the dynamic between the two of them," Benz said. "Darla really is the mother who gave up everything for her son and he doesn't appreciate it." To subtly emphasize that Darla finally achieved redemption, the wardrobe department had Darla wear a soft, virginal dress, and lit her in warm candlelight. Benz said that she attempted to convey "the pure love that exists in a relationship between mother and son. It's an unconditional love, and it’s probably the most simple relationship Darla has ever had."

== Reception and reviews ==
Author Peter David said he was "underwhelmed" by the suggestion that all events of consequence in the series had been manipulated so that Jasmine could be born. "That's pushing predestination to the point where it seems that every decision the characters have made was fated," he complains. Actor David Denman, who plays Skip, calls this episode "probably the best so far. You find out what Skip's all about and where he's from."
