= Soulless (Angel) =

- Angel episode
- Episode no.: Season 4 Episode 11
- Directed by: Sean Astin
- Written by: Sarah Fain; Elizabeth Craft
- Production code: 4ADH11
- Original air date: February 5, 2003

Guest appearances
- Andy Hallett as Lorne; Vladimir Kulich as The Beast

Episode chronology
← Previous "Awakening"	Next → "Calvary"
- Angel season 4

"Soulless" is the 11th episode of the fourth season of the American television series Angel. Written by Elizabeth Craft and Sarah Fain and directed by actor Sean Astin, it was originally broadcast on February 5, 2003 on the WB network. In "Soulless", Angel’s soul has been locked away in an office safe so that his alter ego Angelus can be interrogated about the Beast. After taunting Wesley, Gunn, and Fred about their faults and revealing damaging secrets he, as Angel, knew, Cordelia strikes a deal with Angelus so that he will share information about the Beast.

== Plot ==
At the Hyperion Hotel, the gang carefully puts Angel's contained soul away in the safe, discussing the great risk they all face in dealing with Angelus. Meanwhile, an unchained Angelus sits alone in the basement cage. Wesley cautiously approaches the cage and starts up a discussion with Angelus. Angelus plays games with Wesley, avoiding the important information about The Beast in favor of taunting Wesley about his romantic interest in Fred while the rest of the gang watch the conversation from the lobby via video feed. Angelus continues to be difficult, raising issues of Wesley's failure with Faith and Connor. Connor returns to receive strange looks in the aftermath of Angelus's news, but misinterprets the looks as everyone still thinking he's connected to the Beast.

Gunn and Fred bring Angelus a glass of blood and Angelus happily takes advantage of the opportunity to taunt the couple about the sounds Angel could hear coming from Fred's room at night. Fred pushes a cart towards the cage and Angelus takes the glass, but also shoves the cart into Fred and grabs her when she falls towards the cage. Gunn moves in to rescue Fred, but it's Wesley who shoots Angelus with tranquilizer darts, freeing Fred and knocking Angelus out cold. In Wesley's office, Fred thanks him for saving her, but the conversation takes a turn for the romantic as Wesley kisses Fred. Gunn walks in and, after realizing that something just happened between them, he gets furious. The two men begin to fight until Gunn accidentally hits Fred when she tries to stop them. Angelus is pleased with the discord he has created.

Connor approaches Angelus, who tells Connor that his mother Darla and his adoptive father Holtz were eager to get away from Connor. Connor calmly replies that he knows that Angelus is his real father. Angelus thinks he can take advantage of this and encourages Connor to approach, but Cordelia interrupts and sends Connor away. She then turns off the video camera and offers herself in exchange for all of Angelus's information on the Beast. Angelus is reluctant to take her offer, but later Cordelia informs the gang that Angelus is willing to talk, although she refuses to tell them what she did to get Angelus to talk. Wesley goes downstairs and begins to ask questions. Angelus explains that in 1789, the Beast tried to bribe Angelus into helping him kill three priestesses who were attempting to banish the Beast. Angelus refused to help, and then the priestesses appeared and banished the Beast. Gunn finds that the women live nearby.

Wesley, Cordelia, and Connor find the priestesses and their families have already been murdered by the Beast. After seeing a "Daddy's Birthday" reminder on the family's calendar, Connor runs outside to be sick. Cordelia chases after him and she tries to talk to him, but some vampires interrupt the moment, sending the gang into battle mode. Connor disposes of one and Wesley gets the car for them to escape in. They return to the hotel and everyone realizes that without useful information from Angelus, they need to turn him back into Angel. Cordelia goes downstairs and, despite Angelus's enthusiasm to have her, Cordelia tells him the deal is off since they didn't get to save the world and that they're putting his soul back. Angelus doesn't seem too worried about that, as he's confident he'll get to see the apocalypse come to life. Cordelia returns to the office only to find bad news: the container holding Angel's soul is gone.

== Production ==
"Soulless" was directed by actor Sean Astin, who played Samwise Gamgee in Peter Jackson's The Lord of the Rings. After Astin told writer/director and close friend Doug Petrie about his "fervent desire to be directing episodic television," he shadowed producers David Greenwalt and Tim Minear for several weeks to get a feel for the series before he was given this episode to direct. "Television sort of mandates that you keep moving," Astin says, "but you don't want to stop. Angelus [has] so many layers and so many different shades and qualities, you want to keep exploring them and mining them and pulling them out. It's such a rich, meaty character for him to do. He's good at evil. It's a little creepy."
