= The House Always Wins =

- Angel episode
- Episode no.: Season 4 Episode 3
- Directed by: Marita Grabiak
- Written by: David Fury
- Production code: 4ADH03
- Original air date: October 20, 2002

Guest appearances
- Andy Hallett as Lorne; Clayton Rohner as Lee DeMarco; Morocco Omari as Spencer; Jennifer Autry as Lornette #2; Matt Bushell as Security Guard #3; Tom Schmid as Well Dressed Man; Sven Holmberg as Delivery Guy; Brittany Ishibashi as Vivian; Diana Saunders as Bejeweled Woman; Gloria Alexander as Lornette #1; John Colella as Croupier; Rod Tate as Bruiser

Episode chronology
| ← Previous "Ground State" | Next → "Slouching Toward Bethlehem" |
- Angel season 4

"The House Always Wins" is the third episode of the fourth season of the American television series Angel. Written by David Fury and directed by Marita Grabiak, it was originally broadcast on October 20, 2002, on the WB television network.

In "The House Always Wins", Angel Investigations takes a road trip to Las Vegas to enlist Lorne's help in returning higher being Cordelia to their dimension. While in Vegas, they learn the owner of the Tropicana Casino has been coercing Lorne into reading people's destinies, which the owner sells on the black market in a literal "futures" trading scheme. Angel falls under the influence of the house games, while back in Los Angeles Wesley tries to take advantage of Angel's absence to steal his clients.

== Plot ==
As Angel watches Connor stake a vampire, Cordelia shouts he should focus on rescuing her from her boring life as a higher power. When Fred and Gunn confront Angel on the issues of Connor, Angel realizes he has made life difficult for his friends, and he takes them on a trip to Las Vegas.

They arrive at the Tropicana Casino, where Lorne headlines, complete with scantily clad back-up singers known as the Lornettes. Lorne entices audience members to sing along and ignores Angel and the others. As Lorne rests in his private suite, he receives a visit from his employer and casino owner, Lee DeMarco. Lorne is forced to identify the futures of the people who sang in the audience. Gunn and Fred play Blackjack while Angel worries about Lorne. One of the Lornettes offers one of the singing audience members from Lorne's show, Vivian, a special chip to play in a Spin to Win game. Fred continues to worry about Angel and Lorne; they investigate Lorne's situation to help ease Fred's mind. To get past the guards at Lorne's door, Gunn has Fred dress as one of the Lornettes. Lorne takes a minute to recognize her but he is grateful to see her. He informs her Lee DeMarco is blackmailing him for his psychic abilities.

Vivian walks in a trance-like state across the casino's driveway and is nearly run over by a taxi, but Angel rescues her. He sneaks into the special Spin to Win game area. Lee hands him a chip, which Angel tosses away, but it slides onto the table; when the house wins, Angel loses his destiny. Fred runs from Lorne's room and hysterically convinces the guards outside to enter the room. Lorne escapes, and the three run out into the casino to find Angel. He is playing slot machines in a zombie-like state and ask him to pose a distraction while they rescue Lorne. Angel is too entranced with his gambling to comprehend the plan. DeMarco is pleased when he receives information that Angel is a souled vampire, realizing Angel's destiny will be profitable.

Lorne confesses he tells Lee about the people with bright futures so that they can be lured into the Spin and Win game. Their destinies are sucked into the chip they play and later sold on the black market. Guards spot them; to pose a distraction, Lorne sings a high-pitch noise into a microphone. After they escape, Gunn angrily assumes that Lorne told Lee about Angel. Lorne corrects him by revealing that he is being blackmailed, and if he refuses to cooperate, people will be killed. When Gunn realizes that Angel's destiny has been taken away, he returns to the casino and finds Angel at one of the slot machines. As Spencer arrives with Lorne and Fred held in the custody of his security guards, Angel resumes gambling. The rest of the group is brought into the back room, where Lee orders Fred and Gunn killed and Lorne to return to his work. Meanwhile, Cordelia manipulates Angel's slot machine to win a jackpot so he can be brought into the back room with the others. Lee is angered someone won, but Angel has no explanation.

When one of the men pulls a gun on Fred, it brings out the demon in Angel. He beats up Lee's men, and during the distraction Lorne smashes the glass ball holding the chips, causing all of the destinies to return to their rightful bodies. Back in L.A., the gang is glad to be home, although Angel questions what caused his jackpot. As they head inside the hotel, they freeze when they see Cordelia standing in the middle of the lobby; she does not recognize them.

== Production details ==
This episode was filmed on location in Las Vegas. "We shot from six at night to six in the morning for five nights," recalls writer/producer David Fury. "It was like a movie shoot, we were real stars." The Tropicana Casino at which Lorne headlines is an actual casino on the Strip, although creative license was taken with its location and history. For example, as the group flees the guards, they exit the casino onto Fremont Street (nicknamed Glitter Gulch), which is miles from the actual location of the Tropicana. In addition, Elvis and Priscilla Presley had their wedding reception at the Aladdin Casino, not the Tropicana as Angel claimed. While filming this episode, members of the crew took the opportunity to gamble; camera assistant Adam Ward won $10,000 in a Super Bowl bet.

There are several inside jokes hidden in this episode. During the first shot into the audience during the scene where Lorne is on stage singing, David Fury and Angel script supervisor Petra Jorgensen are sitting in the first row. "I'm holding a little miniature Kelly Manners," Fury says. One of the scrolling banners in the soul-trading room reads DEAL WITH DISNEY TO RUN NEW ABC SERIES, referring to co-creator David Greenwalt, who left Angel earlier that year to produce Miracles.

=== Writing ===
Writer/producer David Fury explains on the DVD commentary that early on, this episode emotionally establishes the characters, reminding viewers that Connor - although not integral to the story - is indeed "Angel Jr."

The scene in which Wesley has phone sex with Lilah was written by creator Joss Whedon when the episode came in short. Actor Alexis Denisof, who plays Wesley, explains that throughout this season his character is "flirting with and investigating the dark side of himself. He's looking at his relationships with all the people and with Angel, and he's definitely looking at his whole purpose and trying to figure out how he wants to be. There are going to be some things that really surprise the audience, that they'd never expect of Wesley."

In an essay linking themes in Angel to classic literature, Joshua Sherman points out that the motif of the stolen soul is dealt with elsewhere in mythology, such as the Soul Cage in Cornwall folklore, or Pakistani stories in which caged birds represent souls.

=== Acting ===
- Andy Hallett, who played Lorne, said this episode was his "favorite-favorite-favorite!" because the cast and crew got to go on location to Las Vegas. He said, "I've always wanted to have like a Vegas show, so it's like a real Vegas show...except that all the people sitting in the audience were getting paid to be there."
- Amy Acker had to dress as a Lornette for the scene in which she helps Lorne escape; Hallett says Acker kept joking, "Andy, I have to overact and act bad - can you give me any tips?"

== Reception and reviews ==
This episode was criticized for being a "throwaway" episode, serving mostly as a plot device to get Lorne and Cordelia back into the series, and for its "thinly veiled" and heavy-handed allegory using magic to show how people can lose their dreams and ambitions by throwing money away in the casinos.
