= Shiny Happy People (disambiguation) =

Shiny Happy People is a 1991 song by R.E.M.

Shiny Happy People may refer to:

- "Shiny Happy People" (Angel), an episode of the TV series Angel
- "Shiny Happy People" (Grey's Anatomy), an episode of the TV series Grey's Anatomy
- Shiny Happy People: Duggar Family Secrets, a documentary series
