= Supersymmetry (Angel) =

- Angel episode
- Episode no.: Season 4 Episode 5
- Directed by: Bill L. Norton
- Written by: Elizabeth Craft; Sarah Fain
- Production code: 4ADH05
- Original air date: November 3, 2002

Guest appearances
- Andy Hallett as Lorne; Stephanie Romanov as Lilah Morgan; Randy Oglesby as Professor Oliver Seidel; Jerry Trainor as Jared

Episode chronology
← Previous "Slouching Toward Bethlehem"	Next → "Spin the Bottle"
- Angel season 4

"Supersymmetry" is the 5th episode of the fourth season of the American television series Angel. Written by Elizabeth Craft and Sarah Fain and directed by Bill L. Norton, it was originally broadcast on November 3, 2002, on the WB network.

== Plot ==
Fred's article on superstring theory is published in an academic journal, and she is asked to present it at a physics symposium by her old college professor Seidel. Her presentation is interrupted when a dimensional portal opens and snake-like creatures emerge to kill her. Angel had spied Lilah during the speech and at first thinks she is behind it, but she was simply keeping an eye on Wesley.

Gunn and Angel suspect another member of the audience, a comic book fanatic who seemed to be expecting the portal's appearance, but it turns out he's just following stories of strange disappearances and reading about Angel on internet forums.

Fred learns that Professor Seidel is the one responsible and that he was the one who sent Fred into the Pylea dimension six years earlier. He felt Fred and other missing colleagues were competing for his job. Against Angel and Gunn's advice, Fred pursues vengeance against her former mentor. She asks for Wesley's help. When she is almost sucked into a portal opened by a text message from Seidel, Wesley agrees to help.

Meanwhile, Cordelia is staying with Connor at his vast empty loft. He trains her to slay vampires while romance blossoms.

Angel confronts Seidel (largely to protect him from Fred's vengeance), but Seidel releases a demon from a portal to attack Angel. Seidel tries to escape, but he encounters Fred. She opens her own portal, intending to send him to a hell dimension as punishment. As he is being sucked in, Gunn arrives. When he is unable to convince Fred to close the portal, Gunn snaps Seidel's neck and throws him into the portal. Fred and Gunn lie to Angel that Seidel fell victim to his own portal meant for Fred.

Connor arrives at the Hyperion Hotel to pick up Cordelia's things because they have decided to live together. Connor and Cordelia battle a common vampire. Elated when she stakes it, Cordelia impulsively kisses Connor. Connor embraces her, but Cordelia is uncomfortable and pulls away. She explains that she still doesn't know who she is or where she belongs. Connor angrily realizes that she's going back to Angel.

Cordelia arrives at the hotel to talk to Angel. She tells him that she is the same person she was before her amnesia, and that person doesn't need protecting. After Angel promises not to lie to her anymore, she asks him if they were in love.

== Reception ==
UGO Networks calls this episode "one of the more interesting looks at murderous intent to come along in a while."
