= Out of Mind, Out of Sight (Buffy the Vampire Slayer) =

- Buffy the Vampire Slayer episode
- Episode no.: Season 1 Episode 11
- Directed by: Reza Badiyi
- Story by: Joss Whedon
- Teleplay by: Ashley Gable; Thomas A. Swyden
- Production code: 4V11
- Original air date: May 19, 1997

Guest appearances
- David Boreanaz as Angel; Clea DuVall as Marcie Ross; Armin Shimerman as Principal Snyder; Mercedes McNab as Harmony Kendall

Episode chronology
← Previous "Nightmares"	Next → "Prophecy Girl"
- Buffy the Vampire Slayer season 1

"Out of Mind, Out of Sight" is the eleventh episode of the first season of the television series Buffy the Vampire Slayer. The episode aired on The WB on May 19, 1997.

Buffy and Cordelia become unlikely allies to combat an invisible force that has targeted Cordelia and everyone around her. Meanwhile, Angel goes to Giles to warn him that Buffy could be in grave danger.

== Plot ==
At Sunnydale High School, Cordelia (Charisma Carpenter) chats with Harmony (Mercedes McNab) and her boyfriend Mitch (Ryan Bittle) about spring fashion and the May Queen contest. Buffy (Sarah Michelle Gellar) accidentally bumps into them, dropping various Slayer items from her bag. When she makes up an excuse about borrowing them from Giles (Anthony Stewart Head) for a history project, they laugh at her for spending so much time in the "creepy library."

After English class, Cordelia sets up a meeting with Ms. Miller (Denise Dowse) the next day to discuss her paper. In the boys' locker room, Mitch is attacked by a floating baseball bat. As Xander (Nicholas Brendon) and Willow (Alyson Hannigan) tease Cordelia about her May Queen campaign, Buffy admits she was May Queen at her old school. Their conversation is cut short when they hear Mitch has been found beaten. Principal Snyder (Armin Shimerman) arrives, and Mitch explains what happened as he is taken to the hospital. Willow and Xander distract Snyder, allowing Buffy to sneak into the locker room, where she discovers the word "LOOK" spray-painted on the lockers.

During lunch, the gang suspects a ghost is behind the recent attacks, and Giles asks Xander to help with the research. Meanwhile, Cordelia tells Harmony that Mitch is recovering but too bruised for prom photos. Harmony is suddenly pushed down a staircase by an invisible force, injuring her ankle. Buffy follows the sound of laughter into the band room, where she feels someone bump into her but sees no one. Xander suggests it could be an invisibility cloak like those used by the Greek gods, but Buffy dismisses the idea due to the petty nature of the attacks.

Later that night, while searching the school, Buffy follows the sound of a flute. In the library, Giles is startled by Angel (David Boreanaz), who offers to retrieve the Pergamum Codex, an ancient book of prophecies.

In another flashback, Cordelia and Harmony talk in the bathroom while ignoring Marcie (Clea DuVall). In the present, Cordelia is crowned May Queen. Reviewing Willow's list of missing students, Buffy notices Marcie's name and realizes she played the flute, confirming her suspicions. After Buffy discovers Marcie's hideout above the band room, Marcie sneaks into Ms. Miller's classroom and attempts to suffocate her with a plastic bag. Cordelia arrives just in time to save her. As they leave, the word "LISTEN" is scrawled on the chalkboard by an invisible hand.

In the library, they examine Marcie's yearbook and notice it's filled with impersonal messages like "Have a nice summer!" — the kind people write when they don't know someone well. Willow and Xander are shocked to learn they had several classes with Marcie the previous year but never noticed her. Giles theorizes Marcie became invisible because people treated her as if she didn't exist: a result of physics, not magic. In a flashback, Marcie raises her hand in class but is overlooked by Ms. Miller. As she slowly lowers it, her body begins to fade from view.

Cordelia runs into the library and begs Buffy for protection, just as the group realizes she is Marcie's next target. They decide to use Cordelia as bait, with Buffy as her bodyguard. In the hallway, Cordelia confides in Buffy that despite being popular, she often feels lonely — but says it still "beats being lonely by yourself."

Marcie lures Willow, Xander, and Giles into the boiler room, locks the door, and turns on the gas. She then kidnaps Cordelia and Buffy. At the Bronze, Buffy and Cordelia wake up tied to chairs. Realizing her face is numb, Cordelia sees the word "LEARN" written on a curtain. Marcie reveals her plan to disfigure Cordelia's face as a lesson. When a flying scalpel cuts Cordelia's cheek, Buffy uses her Slayer senses to locate Marcie and knocks her out. In the boiler room, Angel rescues the others and gives Giles the Codex. Two FBI agents Doyle and Manetti arrive to take Marcie into custody.

The next day, Cordelia surprises the gang by thanking them for their help. However, she mocks them when Mitch arrives, not wanting to risk her popularity. Meanwhile, Marcie is taken to a school for invisible students, overseen by the FBI. In class, she opens a textbook titled Assassination and Infiltration and grins.

== Cultural references ==
Ms. Miller's class discuss the play The Merchant of Venice and its character Shylock.

Cordelia uses the term "Twinkie defense," which is a defense strategy, coined in a 1979 murder trial.

Cordelia mentions to Helen Keller, the deaf and blind American author and political activist.

Buffy says, "All I know is, it's a message. And monsters don't usually send messages. It's pretty much crush, kill, destroy." The line "Crush! Kill! Destroy!" became famous after occurring in the episode "Revolt of the Androids" of the TV show Lost in Space, in which the same line is said by a super-android.

== Continuity ==
Angel meets Giles for the first time and says he can bring him the Pergamum Codex, a key account of Slayer lore that will be pivotal in "Prophecy Girl." Angel is able to save the Scoobies from the boiler room because he was bringing the book to Giles. (In "Orpheus," the Season 4 episode 15 of Angel, Winifred Burkle asks Willow about the Codex.)

Willow wears a white Scooby-Doo t-shirt in this episode. In the Season 2 pilot, "When She Was Bad," Xander wears a red Scooby Doo shirt. In "Beauty and the Beasts" Willow will keep her forensic tools in a Scooby Doo lunch box. Xander calls Buffy's group of friends the "Scooby Gang" for the first time in "What's My Line?"

== Broadcast and reception ==
"Out of Mind, Out of Sight" was first broadcast on The WB. It received a Nielsen rating of 2.3 on its initial airing.

Vox ranked it at #80 on their "Every Episode Ranked From Worst to Best" list of all 144 episodes (to mark the 20th anniversary of the show), writing, "One of the earliest examples of Buffy making someone’s figurative demons literal, this episode makes a neglected girl disappear, leaving her to wreak havoc on the school at will. It’s on the nose but, thanks to some canny voiceover work from Clea Duvall as the invisible girl, surprisingly affecting in the end."

Noel Murray of The A.V. Club rated the episode B, writing that it "comes awfully close to being a classic, but can't quite overcome ... some erratic performances and a plot that's more busy than necessary". He praised the more subtle scenes but said that it was "a little too blunt about its metaphor". DVD Talk's Phillip Duncan called "Out of Mind, Out of Sight" "[a]n ingenious combination of monster and social commentary [that] make this another standout episode". A review from the BBC was also positive, describing it as a "clever script" with "a carefully polished plot".

Rolling Stone ranked "Out of Mind, Out of Sight" at #107 on their "Every Episode Ranked From Worst to Best" list, writing that "dealing with the trauma and trials of adolescence while instilling its own supernatural flair – classic Buffy. A student who has been overlooked and ignored by her peers has turned invisible, and now aims to destroy Cordelia. It’s not the most subtle of storytelling devices, but it’s effective nonetheless."

"Out of Mind, Out of Sight" was ranked at #83 on Paste Magazine's "Every Episode Ranked" list and #114 on BuzzFeed's "Ranking Every Episode" list.

== Notes ==
1.Giles: "I've studied all the extant volumes, of course. But the most salient books of Slayer prophecy have been lost. The Tiberius Manifesto, the Pergamum Codex..." Angel: "The Codex?" Giles: "It's reputed to have contained the most complete prophecies about the Slayer's role in the end years. Unfortunately, the book was lost in the 15th century." Angel: "Not lost. Misplaced. I can get it."
