= Players (Angel) =

- Angel episode
- Episode no.: Season 4 Episode 16
- Directed by: Michael Grossman
- Written by: Jeffrey Bell; Elizabeth Craft; Sarah Fain
- Production code: 4ADH16
- Original air date: March 26, 2003

Guest appearances
- Alexa Davalos as Gwen Raiden; Dana Lee as Takeshi Morimoto; David Monahan as Garrett; Hope Shin as Aiko Morimoto; Wendy Haines as Over-Jeweled Woman; Michael Patrick McGill as Checkpoint Guard; John Fremont as Security Guy

Episode chronology
← Previous "Orpheus"	Next → "Inside Out"
- Angel season 4

"Players" is the 16th episode of the fourth season of the American television series Angel. Gwen Raiden returns to ask Gunn to help her rescue a young girl from a wealthy and powerful tycoon. Meanwhile, Angel and the rest of his team are researching Cordelia’s sudden pregnancy.

== Plot ==
Gwen exchanges money for information with a man in downtown Los Angeles and is then soon struck by lightning. She is planning a heist, ostensibly to rescue a young girl, Lisa, from a tycoon who kidnapped her from the head of a company over a business deal gone bad. She enlists the help of Gunn, someone suave enough for the job. They arrive by limo at the tycoon's compound, dressed in formal wear for a dinner party. After some difficulty, Gunn gains entrance by greeting the host, Takeshi Morimoto, in Japanese, and charming him based on Gwen's dossier of Morimoto's charitable work.

It soon becomes apparent to Gunn that Gwen has tricked him: Instead of a kidnapped girl, Gwen is after a high-tech military device titled L.I.S.A. which will enable Gwen to control her electrical powers and touch other people. Gunn is caught in the ruse taking the daughter of Morimoto, though he is able to fight his way free. He finds Gwen after the distraction he had created for her, but they are cornered by Morimoto and his men. Gwen sends a shock of electricity through them all, and Gunn and Gwen escape back to her place. They test the device, a prototype that regulates components of the body for the purpose of stealth, on Gwen. It enters her system through her bare back, and they both realize it works. With relief, the two kiss. Without much human contact in all her years and knowing that L.I.S.A. is only a prototype, Gwen is reluctant to let things continue, but Gunn convinces her otherwise, and they continue to kiss and it is implied that they have sex.

Meanwhile, at the hotel, the gang reels from the shock of Cordelia's very sudden pregnancy. Connor is still agitated by the situation, and Cordelia continues to manipulate his feelings about their family. She explains that she may ask him to do other things before the baby arrives, but there will be a good reason for them all. Fred and Wesley research and talk about the strange relationship between Cordelia and Connor. At the office, Angel tries to remember an ancient code from Lilah's book that may tell them something about the Master. Cordelia tries to disguise her displeasure that they could be getting crucial information about her and attempts to spill coffee on the paper, but Angel's not-so-accurate memory of the text saves her the trouble.

Lorne returns with news that he has information on a ritual that can be performed to restore his empathic powers and that he has to go off on his own to do it. In an empty building, Lorne prepares the ritual, while unknown to him, Cordelia watches from a hidden spot above. Lorne begins the ritual and starts to sing as Cordelia slowly descends some stairs and approaches with a raised knife. Before she can strike, the lights suddenly turn on, exposing Cordelia and Angel standing behind her. Cordy turns and finds Fred and Wesley are also there, both with guns pointed at her, and Lorne refers to a Magic 8 Ball to find out if Cordy's been bad. Lorne then turns to read the Magic 8-ball, and it says "definitely."
