= Shiny Happy People (Angel) =

- Angel episode
- Episode no.: Season 4 Episode 18
- Directed by: Marita Grabiak
- Written by: Elizabeth Craft; Sarah Fain
- Production code: 4ADH18
- Original air date: April 9, 2003

Guest appearances
- Gina Torres as Jasmine; Sam Witwer as John Stoler; David Figlioli as Vamp Leader; Suzette Craft as Teacherly Woman; Annie Wersching as Awed Woman; Steven Bean as Middle-Aged Man; Lynette Romero as News Anchor; Lyle Kanouse as Diner Counter Guy; Tawny Rene Hamilton as Host of Good Morning LA; Chane't Johnson as Martha Jane; Jackie Tohn as Woman #1

Episode chronology
← Previous "Inside Out"	Next → "The Magic Bullet"
- Angel season 4

"Shiny Happy People" is the 18th episode of the fourth season of the American television series Angel. Written by Elizabeth Craft and Sarah Fain, and directed by Marita Grabiak, it was originally broadcast on April 9, 2003 on the WB network. As Cordelia lies in a coma following her demonic delivery, the rest of the gang becomes enchanted by her unexpected offspring - a full grown woman, whom Angel names Jasmine, who hypnotizes anyone she meets by mere sight. Jasmine tells the gang that she is a former higher being who wants the world clean of all evil. But when Fred has a sudden vision of Jasmine as something other than good, or human, she must find the root to Jasmine’s true nature on her own. The episode's title is derived from the R.E.M. song of the same name.

== Plot ==
After bursting from Cordelia's womb in a flash of blue-green light, the godly woman materializes and covers herself with a blanket. She appreciates the world around her and thanks Cordelia for giving her life. Guiltily, Angel offers the woman his sword to punish him for his earlier intentions of killing her. Fred cleans up around the office while she worries and rants to Lorne about what happened with Cordelia and whether Angel could have really killed her. Connor returns to the hotel and Fred pulls a knife on him, but his strange peaceful behavior confuses her. Angel shows that he's returned as well with a no-longer pregnant Cordelia and he's just as strangely happy as Connor. Wesley and Gunn come upstairs from the basement where they were dismembering Skip, and they all marvel over Cordelia's return and the strange behavior of Angel and Connor.

Awe-struck Angel and Connor boast about this godly creature that rose from Cordelia whom they don't want to kill, but merely to worship. Wesley tries to convince Angel that he's under a magical influence and this creature is evil, but then the woman arrives and kindly offers to help the gang as they all fall to their knees. Later, as Cordelia rests in a bed and candles are lit around the room, the woman explains how she was a power in the very beginning, before man, then became a watcher as humans developed, and finally could not stand to watch any longer and planned a return. She explains how Angel's trip to the trials to win Darla's life bought not Darla's life but Connor's, which was just one of the miracles necessary to bring her into the world. Once Connor was born and Cordelia had ascended to a higher plane, she had the vessels necessary to bring her into the world. She then tells the group that they have all been drowning in the war against evil, but that soon she will take them on the offensive and turn the tide.

A group of vampires tries bowling with a human head for a ball, but it doesn't work. One of them tries to explain that they're there for a good reason, but he doesn't have time to finish as the gang appear and start to fight. The woman and Fred sit and talk about a name, but as they sit, one vampire scratches the woman with its claws. Angel chases the vampire outside and stakes it in front of a crowd of dining people. The woman comes outside, her arm bleeding from the scratch and the crowd falls to their knees. She preaches to them about her power and how wonderful the world will be now that she's there. A man in the crowd grabs a knife and charges at this apparent "monster," but Angel vamps and stops the man, punching him repeatedly. The woman stops Angel and brushes her hand across the man's face before asking Wesley to call for an ambulance. She continues to preach to the crowd about good things as the beaten man wonders why the others can't see what he sees.

At the hotel, the gang tries to brainstorm ideas for a name that fits for the woman. Fred feels guilty about letting the woman get hurt, and muses about how she can clean the shirt for the woman, despite the lack of need for it. As Fred rushes off to continue trying to clean the shirt, the woman observes the common love Wesley and Gunn have for Fred. Connor apologizes for allowing the woman to be hurt, but she shows that the wound has almost healed completely already. He questions why the man tried to hurt her, but she doesn't have much of an explanation for him. The woman moves outside to see Angel, admiring the smell of the jasmine in the Hotel's garden. Angel feels terrible about failing her again and worries about becoming too happy, but the woman offers him inspiration and comfort for his feelings.

Fred scrubs roughly at the shirt while Angel and the other males set out on a mission to destroy vampires and demons, guided by the all-powerful woman. The next day, Fred returns to the lobby, revealing that she had to buy a new shirt for the woman, then breaks down into tears because she can't stand not being around the woman. Upstairs, Lorne shows the woman her new, beautifully decorated room and she loves it. After Lorne leaves, she senses Connor walking in the halls outside and invites him in to talk. She explains why he's special, why he deserves happiness and why he was chosen to be her father. Fred comes into the room to give the woman the new shirt, but instead of the woman's normal beauty, Fred sees a decaying corpse covered in insects. She panics and as the others come in to see what the fuss is about, she quickly excuses herself.

Fred goes to talk to a still unconscious Cordelia, and tells her about the seriousness of their situation since no one else seems aware that there might be a problem or how to deal with it. Angel catches Fred and talks to her about the great new woman in their lives. Fred tries to get him to think about the strangeness of their situation and this seemingly wonderful woman, but Angel's faith is unwavering. Later, Fred goes to the local hospital to check up on the man that tried to attack the godlike woman. The receptionist eventually tells Fred where she can find the man, John Stoler: in the Psychiatric ward. Fred sneaks into John Stoler's room, where he's strapped to a bed, and confronts him about what he saw. She convinces him that she saw the same thing and then he reveals that the side of his face that Jasmine touched has become deformed and decayed. He tells her she's been called like him to stop this woman and her evil, but Fred doesn't like that idea very much and runs off.

Fred returns to the hotel to find that the hotel is full of people who followed Jasmine back to the hotel after she took a walk. Fred talks covertly to Wesley about her visit to the hospital and what she saw. Wesley says he believes her, then goes over to talk to Gunn and then Jasmine upstairs. The news spreads amongst the gang and Fred panics, heading for the weapons cabinet. She grabs a crossbow and lets a bolt fly at Jasmine. Angel takes the bolt in the shoulder and drops to the floor below with Connor chasing after. Lorne tries to confront Fred about her actions, but she pulls a knife on him and uses him to keep the others at bay. Jasmine tells Fred that her love will always be there and Fred lets Lorne go, then runs away alone.

Fred drives alone and stops along the street, crying to herself. Later, after the other guests have left, Angel brings the woman a bundle of jasmine flowers, while the others talk about the fact that Fred is now evil. The woman tries to motivate and keep the mood positive, but classifies Fred as a danger to their purpose. The gang decides that they need to kill Fred, but the woman suggests they wait and try to help her first. A depressed Fred has breakfast at a diner and she watches as the morning news program has a special guest: the godlike creature, Jasmine. The other patrons in the diner drop to their knees and a horrified Fred wanders out onto the streets, alone.

== Reception ==
In this episode, Jasmine draws a line all the way back to "The Trial" in explaining all the events of the last two seasons. Webzine PopMatters was dissatisfied with this idea, complaining that "the whole 'it's all part of the Plan' thing becomes an excuse for all sorts of leaps in the plot."
