= Salvage (Angel) =

- Angel episode
- Episode no.: Season 4 Episode 13
- Directed by: Jefferson Kibbee
- Written by: David Fury
- Production code: 4ADH13
- Original air date: March 5, 2003

Guest appearances
- Andy Hallett as Lorne; Stephanie Romanov as Lilah Morgan; Vladimir Kulich as The Beast; Eliza Dushku as Faith; Kara Holden as Young Woman; Billy Riek as Paco Vamp; Joel David Moore as Karl Vamp; Alonzo Bodden as Prison Guard; Joshua Grenrock Demon in Bar; Addie Daddio as Rosaria Vamp; Brett Wagner as Bohg'dar Demon; Spice Williams as Debbie

Episode chronology
← Previous "Calvary"	Next → "Release"
- Angel season 4

"Salvage" is the 13th episode of the fourth season of the American television series Angel, originally broadcast on the WB television network. After discovering Lilah’s dead body, a grieving Wesley breaks rogue slayer Faith out of prison so she can help track down Angelus. Meanwhile, Lorne performs a sanctuary spell to keep Angelus out of the hotel while Cordelia—secretly revealed to be the big evil controlling the Beast—confides in Connor that she is pregnant.

== Plot ==
Angelus, who has been stalking Lilah, is disappointed when he finds her already dead. Wesley and Gunn discover him holding her body, drinking whatever is left of her blood; he escapes through a window, allowing the two to assume he killed her. Downstairs, when Wesley and Gunn return to the lobby with news of Lilah's death, Lorne suggests protecting the hotel with the same magic that forbids violence at his club. When the group realizes that Angelus could have turned Lilah into a vampire, Wesley offers to prevent her potential rising.

Angelus visits a demon bar—where he is raucously received—to question the patrons on the whereabouts of the Beast. In the basement, Wesley prepares to behead Lilah. After an imaginary conversation where he apologizes for their "not-a-relationship", he finally brings down the ax. Connor intends to destroy Angelus despite Cordelia's protests, but when he starts to leave, Cordelia faints mid-speech and Connor stops to care for her.

Meanwhile, Slayer Faith works out in prison until another prisoner threatens her with a knife. Faith efficiently knocks the woman out. As the corrections officer hauls the other prisoner away, reassuring Faith they saw how she was attacked, Faith notices the ornate Bringer knife that was used. Angelus follows the scent of Lilah's blood to the weapon used to kill her, in the Beast's possession. The Beast says Angelus is a part of his master's plans, but Angelus refuses to take orders and leaves. Cordelia—revealed as the Beast's master—is disappointed. The Beast apologizes for his failures and she forgives him, then the two kiss.

Lorne performs the protection spell, and Wesley returns from the basement saying he intends to restore Angel's soul. Wesley visits Faith at the prison to ask for her help; although initially disinterested, upon learning that Angelus has "returned," she crashes through the glass, knocks out the prison guards, and jumps out of the high window with Wesley. (The clear implication is that Faith could have escaped prison any time she liked and only remained there as part of her self-imposed redemption efforts.) Faith tells him that she won't kill Angelus because of Angel's crucial role in her life and Wesley admits that's precisely why he chose her for the job. When they arrive at the hotel, Faith asserts herself as commander. Connor is displeased with her decision to rescue Angelus, not kill him, but Faith makes it clear her plan is the only plan.

Angelus, after overhearing a Slayer is in town, immediately calls Buffy Summers's house. When Dawn Summers confirms her sister is still in Sunnydale, he realizes Faith must be the Slayer on the loose. Connor leads Faith, Wesley and Gunn into a factory (where Angelus has, with typical sardonic intent, erected a "Welcome, Faith" banner) and despite Faith's orders, beheads the first vampire that crosses his path. Faith yells at the teen for disobeying her and then tells him to go home because he refuses to listen to her. The two fight, but Faith is clearly stronger and eventually holds a crossbow to Connor's throat in warning. Connor returns to the hotel with Gunn, as Wesley and Faith split up to search the factory.

Faith finds Angelus with the Beast; she is badly beaten by the creature until Angelus stabs the Beast with a dagger made of the Beast's flesh, killing the demon and restoring the sun. Faith knocks out a large window, flooding the room with sunlight, forcing Angelus to keep his distance. At the hotel, the gang rejoices in the return of the sun and Connor goes upstairs to tell Cordelia. Connor sings Faith's praises until Cordy interrupts with news that she's pregnant with his child.
