= Spin the Bottle (Angel) =

- Angel episode
- Episode no.: Season 4 Episode 6
- Directed by: Joss Whedon
- Written by: Joss Whedon
- Production code: 4ADH06
- Original air date: November 10, 2002

Guest appearances
- Andy Hallett as Lorne; Vladimir Kulich as The Beast; Sven Holmberg as Delivery Guy; Kam Heskin as Lola

Episode chronology
← Previous "Supersymmetry"	Next → "Apocalypse, Nowish"
- Angel season 4

"Spin the Bottle" is the sixth episode of the fourth season of the American television series Angel. Written and directed by series creator Joss Whedon, it was originally broadcast on November 10, 2002 on the WB television network. In "Spin the Bottle", Lorne performs a magic spell on Cordelia to help her regain her memory, but instead the spell causes all the Angel Investigations members to revert to their teenage personae.

== Plot ==
After his rendition of "The Way We Were", Lorne addresses an unseen lounge audience. In an attempt to restore Cordelia's memory, Lorne obtains a bottle containing a memory-restoration spell, which Cordelia is eager to try. Wesley arrives, having been asked to help with the spell, and has an awkward meeting with Fred. She vaguely informs him that her mission was completed, as Gunn realizes that Wesley helped Fred try to kill her professor. When he confronts Wesley, he also threatens Wes to not pursue Fred, but Wes tries to dismiss the issue. Gunn asks what happened to Wesley. He reminds Gunn that "I had my throat cut and all my friends abandoned me." The gang hold hands in a circle around the bottle as it starts to spin. The spell disorients everyone; Lorne passes out and the others stumble about the lobby as if very high. Cordelia accidentally smashes the bottle with her boot. All present are mentally regressed to the age of 17: Cordelia when she was the most popular girl at Sunnydale High, Wesley believes he is still a student at the Watcher's Academy, Gunn is once again a rebellious street kid, Fred is transformed into a younger and insecure girl who likes marijuana; and Angel has reverted to his teenaged pre-vampire self — an Irishman named Liam (he was not sired until age 26). While Liam wonders what happened to his Irish accent, Gunn and Wesley butt heads on plans. When Wesley tries to demonstrate his toughness with a karate demonstration, he unintentionally activates the stake weapon up his sleeve. Gunn and Fred find Lorne passed out behind the counter, and are shocked to see a demon. Meanwhile, Connor saves a young woman from two vampires. The woman offers her body in repayment, but only if he pays.

Back at the hotel, Wesley duct tapes Lorne to the seat in the lobby while arguing with Gunn over whether to cut Lorne's head off or torture him for information. When Cordelia asks why they're not freaking out about wooden stakes or the sight of a green man with horns, Wesley and Gunn both reveal that vampires and demons are real and they both have experience with them. Fred examines an unconscious Lorne while Wesley shares his theory that they're being kept in the hotel with a vampire as a test. They all start to wonder why they don't look 17, and collectively decide to hunt for the vampire that will supposedly set them free once they kill it. Cordelia and Angel team up and go one way while the other three head in the other direction. Angel struggles to adjust to this strange world that is hundreds of years beyond his life. He and Cordelia sit on the bed, and after apologizing for acting so "womanish", Cordelia comforts him, and, feeling his muscles, begins to flirt with him. Angel vamps out and realizes he is a vampire and he will be killed if the gang finds out.

Angel tries to leave the hotel, but panics when he spots the cars on the street and rushes back inside. As the group regathers in the lobby, Wesley introduces a new theory: the vampire may be one of them. He passes a cross around the group, but when it finally reaches Angel, he manages to hide his smoking hand until a distraction develops. Lorne wakes up, his memory unaffected, and identifies Angel as a vampire. Angel punches Lorne, knocking him out again. A fight breaks out between Angel, Wesley and Gunn, and the girls run in separate directions. Angel catches Cordelia, who screams loudly, drawing a lurking Connor out of the shadows. Angel rants to Connor about fathers as the two fight, while in the lobby, Lorne convinces Fred to release him, and he mixes together a concoction to restore their memories.

After treating the others, Lorne puts a touch of the mixture on Cordy's tongue. She pauses and then runs off. Lorne finishes up his story at the lounge: describing what really happened was she was struck with a vision of a terrifying demon; Cordelia reveals to Angel that she remembers everything, and confirms that before she lost her memory she was in love with him. Lorne then walks off and the camera reveals an empty Lounge.

== Production details ==
Writer/director Joss Whedon says this episode grew out of his desire to see Wesley returned to the "bumbling moron" of the past. "We were reminiscing about the days when he was a complete idiot, and so we thought we wanted to see old-school Wesley but also cool, new-school Wesley," Whedon explains. Although the regression to a comedic figure contrasts his new, darker persona, Wesley still exhibits heroism during this episode, which is in line with the growth his character experienced over the last four years. Peggy Davis argues that "Wesley can embody masculine heroism or feminine comic figure, but not both"; however in this episode he demonstrates that his heroic masculinity allows for a comedic element as well. In addition to bringing back "classic Wesley", this episode also gave the opportunity to refresh viewers' memories of "teenage bitch queen" Cordelia from Buffy, whose character changed dramatically during her time on Angel.

Whedon gave Lorne's spell the side-effect of making the gang "high" to differentiate this memory spell from a similar one used in the Buffy episode "Tabula Rasa", readily admitting the spell itself is "lazy writing," meant only to set the plot in motion. The frame narrative established by Lorne in the night club was done to highlight the postmodern aspects of the episode, explains Whedon. The artificiality of the night club, and Lorne's breaking of the fourth wall when he comments on the commercials that played during the act break, provides a foreground for the alternate reality caused by the spell. Whedon notes that while writing this episode, he already knew that Connor and Cordelia were going to have sex, but the story had to move faster than he had originally planned because Carpenter became pregnant.

=== Acting ===
This episode took much longer to film due to the cast finding it difficult to stop laughing. Amy Acker and Andy Hallett ruined dozens of takes by giggling, and Alexis Denisof and David Boreanaz prolonged shooting for an hour and a half when they could not stop laughing. To get the scene, Denisof explains he and Boreanaz resolved not to look at each other; on the DVD commentary Whedon points out background shots where Boreanaz is still failing to keep a straight face.

== Reception and reviews ==
The DVD commentary for this episode, featuring writer/director Joss Whedon and actor Alexis Denisof, ranks third on Slayage.com.

This episode is one of the more well regarded of the season, with UGO Networks commenting that it is "a bit of a high point" of the season and "great fun all around." Pointing out that Whedon had previously explored amnesia on Buffy, here he "goes back to the well here with a twist." Sci-fi.com calls it the best of the "light" episodes this season, due to the writing and directing credits of Joss Whedon.

The Futon Critic named it the 33rd best episode of 2002, saying "it was particularly interesting in this episode to see Cordelia (along with the rest of the cast) forced to revisit their younger selves after a memory spell goes awry. How Chase, David Boreanaz, Alexis Denisof and company all step their characters back a few years without missing a beat is something that borders on extraordinary to watch."
