= Cordelia Chase =

Character in Buffy the Vampire Slayer and Angel

- Buffy the Vampire Slayer / Angel character
- Charisma Carpenter as Cordelia
- First appearance: "Welcome to the Hellmouth" (1997)
- Last appearance: "You're Welcome (Angel)" (2004)
- Created by: Joss Whedon
- Portrayed by: Charisma Carpenter
- Voiced by: Charisma Carpenter

In-universe information
- Affiliation: Angel Investigations; The Powers That Be; Scooby Gang
- Classification: Higher being Human (originally)
- Notable powers: Precognitive visions Skilled in swordplay and other methods of combat Photographic reflexes derived from her cheerleader training

Cordelia Chase is a fictional character created by Joss Whedon for the television series Buffy the Vampire Slayer; she also appeared on Buffy's spin-off series, Angel. Portrayed by Charisma Carpenter, the character appears as a series regular in the first three seasons of Buffy, before leaving the show and becoming a series regular during the first four seasons of Angel. The character made her last television appearance in 2004, appearing as a special guest star in Angel's 100th episode. Cordelia also appears in both canonical and apocryphal Buffy and Angel material such as comic books and novels.

Cordelia is introduced in "Welcome to the Hellmouth" as one of Sunnydale High's popular students, attending school alongside vampire slayer Buffy Summers. Through her interactions with Buffy and her friends, she comes to accept the existence of supernatural forces and helps Buffy fight against them. In the television series Angel, Cordelia joins Angel, a heroic vampire with a soul, in forming a detective agency dedicated to stopping supernatural forces and helping the helpless. After Cordelia acquires the ability to see visions of those in need, she becomes a more compassionate and heroic character. In the middle of the third season, she becomes a love interest of the protagonist Angel. In the fourth season of Angel, she appears to take on a villainous role before it is revealed that she is possessed by a malevolent deity; this storyline eventually leads to her death and subsequent exit from the series. The character makes further canonical appearances in the comic books Buffy Season Eight and Angel: After the Fall, in a dream flashback and as a spirit guide.

Created as a foil for Buffy's titular heroine, Cordelia was initially characterized as "shallow", "vain" and "self-centered", and was used in the series to create conflict for the other characters. The character went through changes as she gradually redeemed herself throughout the course of Buffy and Angel, and has received attention in academic texts related to gender studies and social status.

== Appearances ==
=== Television ===
==== Buffy the Vampire Slayer ====
Cordelia Chase first appears in the premiere episode of Buffy the Vampire Slayer, titled "Welcome to the Hellmouth". Introduced as a potential friend for Sunnydale High's newest student, Buffy Summers (Sarah Michelle Gellar), Cordelia reveals her true colors by cruelly mocking Willow (Alyson Hannigan) whom Buffy befriends instead.

Ignorant of the supernatural, Cordelia shows up regularly throughout the first season of Buffy to insult and ridicule the other characters. She plays a larger role in the episode "Out of Mind, Out of Sight", in which she falls victim to a social outcast who wants revenge on popular students for ignoring her so much that she turned invisible. In the season finale, Cordelia helps Buffy and her friends battle vampires, finally coming to terms with the existence of supernatural forces.

In season 2, Cordelia becomes a more active ally to the "Scooby Gang" and begins a romantic relationship with Xander Harris (Nicholas Brendon) in "What's My Line? Part 2". Dating someone of Xander's social status causes Cordelia's ostracism from her popular peers and she reluctantly breaks up with him. However, when Xander performs a love spell to pay her back for hurting him, Cordelia realises how much he cares about her and takes him back, rejecting her superficial friends in the process.

In season 3's "Lovers Walk", Cordelia is heartbroken to see Xander kissing Willow and ends their relationship. By the season 3 episode "The Wish", Cordelia slips back into her antagonistic persona from the first season, disassociating herself from the Scooby Gang altogether. In the episode "The Prom", she reveals that her house and her family's entire wealth has just been seized for tax fraud and both of her parents (never named or seen on-camera) are now in prison. Cordelia later attempts an unsuccessful relationship with Wesley (Alexis Denisof) and makes peace with Xander at the prom. In the season 3 finale, she rallies alongside Buffy and her friends at graduation against the demonic Mayor of Sunnydale (Harry Groener), where Cordelia slays her first vampire.

==== Angel ====
After three seasons on Buffy, Cordelia left the series to move over to star in Angel, a spin-off series focusing on the reformed vampire Angel (David Boreanaz). The first season sees Cordelia move to Los Angeles, in the hopes of escaping her new-found poverty by becoming an actress. After Angel saves her life in the series pilot, Cordelia helps him found the supernatural detective agency Angel Investigations, working in an administrative position.

During this time, Cordelia also becomes close to half-demon co-worker Doyle (Glenn Quinn), but their budding romance is ended by his death nine episodes into the series. Before dying in the episode "Hero", Doyle passes his ability to see people in distress over to Cordelia when he kisses her. Cordelia initially views the visions as a curse. However, after a demon causes Cordelia's visions to overwhelm her in the season 1 finale – causing her to experience worldwide pain – she vows to help those in need after she recovers.

In season 2's "Reunion", Cordelia and the other staff at Angel Investigations are fired by Angel, who is becoming increasingly obsessed with bringing down the evil law firm Wolfram & Hart. Cordelia joins Wesley and Charles Gunn (J. August Richards) in re-forming the agency on their own. Angel and Cordelia eventually reconcile in the episode "Epiphany". As her acting career continues to flounder, Cordelia is sucked into and made princess of a medieval hell dimension called Pylea in the episode "Over the Rainbow". When presented with the opportunity to pass her visions over to a champion named the Groosalugg (Mark Lutz), Cordelia refuses and returns to L.A. with her friends in the season 2 finale.

In season 3's "Birthday", Cordelia learns from the demon Skip (David Denman) that her visions are slowly killing her because human beings are not strong enough to control them. To save her life, Cordelia accepts Skip's offer to alter history so that she never met Angel in L.A., instead landing her big break as an actress. However, even in this alternate timeline, Cordelia feels compelled to help others and eventually crosses paths with Angel again, who received the visions in her place and is now insane. Unable to let her friend suffer, Cordelia has Skip return the timeline to normal, and agrees to become half-demon, with new powers, in order to harbor the visions safely.

Season 3 also sees Angel become a father, with Cordelia stepping in to mother Connor until the infant is kidnapped into a hell dimension in the episode "Sleep Tight", only to emerge as a disturbed teenager (Vincent Kartheiser) in "The Price". In the episode "Waiting in the Wings", Angel realizes he has romantic feelings for Cordelia, but is prevented from voicing them by the return of Groosalugg.

Cordelia dates Groosalugg for the remainder of season 3, but Groo notices she loves Angel instead and decides to leave. In the season 3 finale, Cordelia arranges to meet Angel to confess her feelings, but is prevented from doing so by Skip, who informs her that she has become a higher being. Cordelia accepts her duty, and leaves Earth for another dimension.

In season 4, Cordelia feels trapped in her position as a higher being, and so in the episode "The House Always Wins" she returns to Earth in an amnesiac state. In "Spin the Bottle", her memories are returned via a spell, along with a vision of a mysterious Beast (Vladimir Kulich). Afterward, she admits to Angel the feelings she once had for him.

As L.A. succumbs to the apocalypse in the episode "Apocalypse, Nowish", Cordelia begins to behave out-of-character; she seduces Connor, murders Lilah (Stephanie Romanov) in the episode "Calvary", commands the Beast in "Salvage", and magically battles former friend Willow to keep Angel from his soul in the episode "Orpheus".

In the episode "Players", the team realize that the now pregnant Cordelia is possessed, so Cordelia takes the unstable Connor on the run with her so they may give birth to their supernatural "offspring" Jasmine (Gina Torres). In "Inside Out", Jasmine is revealed to be a higher being who possessed Cordelia before she returned to Earth, manipulating events to be born in a new body of her own. Cordelia falls into a post-natal coma for season 4's remainder.

Following an eleven-episode absence, Cordelia returns in season 5, in the 100th episode "You're Welcome". Having (apparently) awoken from her coma, Cordelia reunites with Angel Investigations, who have taken over Wolfram & Hart since their defeat of Jasmine. She chastises Angel for accepting W&H's "deal with the devil" and reminds him of his true mission and higher calling. Together, they face and defeat their old enemy Lindsey McDonald (Christian Kane) who had been impersonating Doyle in an attempt to destroy Angel. In the episode's closing moments, Cordelia reiterates to Angel that she loves him and kisses him, shortly before he receives a phone call reporting that Cordelia died that morning in the hospital. When Angel turns around, Cordelia is gone. It is later revealed that this encounter - the Powers That Be repaying their debt to Cordelia - allowed Cordelia to pass one last vision over to Angel, giving him the knowledge he needs to bring down the Circle of the Black Thorn.

==== Buffy the Animated Series ====
Between 2001 and 2004, Joss Whedon and Jeph Loeb developed a 4-minute pilot episode for Buffy the Animated Series, which was set during the show's first season. Had the series been picked up by a network, it would have featured Cordelia (voiced by Charisma Carpenter) in more high-school adventures. Following a 2008 leak of the pilot to YouTube, Loeb expressed some hope that the series may be resurrected in some form.

=== Literature ===
Cordelia also appears in comic books and novels based on the Buffy and Angel television series. The Cordelia Collection, Vol. 1 by Nancy Krulik is a novelization of the Buffy episodes "Out of Mind, Out of Sight", "Some Assembly Required" and "Homecoming". These episodes tell specific incidents in which Cordelia becomes targeted: by a scorned classmate, to become a zombie's bride and by hunters in a case of mistaken identity. She appears in numerous Angel novels as a member of Angel Investigations, but some feature Cordelia more prominently; in Not Forgotten she uncovers exploitation of child immigrants, while in Haunted she appears as a contestant on a supernatural-themed reality television show when she has a vision about another applicant. Cordelia appears in the majority of Angel comics, published by Dark Horse Comics during 2000–2002 and set between episodes of the television series. She appears less frequently in those by IDW Publishing between 2005 and 2011, mainly in stories set in and after the fifth season. Cordelia typically plays a minimal role in the Dark Horse Angel comics. However, issue seventeen was a "Cordelia Special", in which demonic items are stashed in Cordelia's apartment. In the Dark Horse Presents story "Lovely dark and deep", Cordelia lands a role as the star of a demonic movie. Cordelia appears in the IDW Publishing comic mini-series Angel: The Curse, set after season 5, in flashback scenes. She subsequently reappears in the mini-series Angel: Old Friends, which sees Angel battle evil clones of his friends. Cordelia claims to be the genuine article, having returned from the dead, but Angel is unconvinced and kills her; his suspicions prove correct when her body immediately disintegrates like the other clones.

Angel: After the Fall, a canonical comic book continuation of the television series plotted by Joss Whedon and written by Brian Lynch, features the characters of Angel and all of Los Angeles condemned to Hell after the events of the series finale "Not Fade Away". Cordelia does not appear until the twelfth issue, in which she acts as a guide to Angel in his dying moments; it is revealed she serves in some capacity as a higher power now. The character departs in issue thirteen. Cordelia also appears in a dream sequence within the twentieth issue of Buffy's canonical continuation, Buffy the Vampire Slayer Season Eight, titled "After These Messages... We'll Be Right Back!". Buffy dreams of when she was in her first year at Sunnydale High; Cordelia's physical appearance is based on the art style of Loeb and Whedon's unproduced Buffy animated series.

== Conception and casting ==
Cordelia was originally intended to serve as a dramatic foil to the series' main character Buffy Summers. Adapting the concept of the movie into a television series, Whedon decided to reinvent the character of Buffy. The shallow cheerleader of the 1992 Buffy film, as played by Kristy Swanson, had grown more mature and open-minded. Buffy now identified with the social outcasts, such as Willow and Xander. As a result, Cordelia Chase was created to embody the traits of that shallower Buffy. Despite portraying a shallow, valley girl stock character, actress Charisma Carpenter felt that Cordelia in early seasons was not "one-dimensional", nor was she "as superficial as people thought". At the same time, Carpenter was critical of her frequent role as the damsel in distress. Angel co-creator and executive producer David Greenwalt describes Cordelia in her Buffy years as "a somewhat shallow, somewhat vain, somewhat self-centered but [a] lively and honest character who spoke her mind". Indeed, even not when superhuman, she showed a lot of hardiness.

Charisma Carpenter had originally planned to read for the role of Buffy, but was late for her audition and instead tried out for Cordelia. Carpenter, who had dressed casually for the role of Buffy—who she believed "could really be herself"—felt unprepared to read for Cordelia because she "was definitely a character to dress for". Although she had only fifteen minutes to prepare for the character, the producers were "really responsive" to Carpenter's audition, and she left feeling confident she had got the part. After Carpenter's audition, actress Sarah Michelle Gellar, who had been offered the role of Cordelia before Carpenter, was asked to come back and audition for the part of Buffy. Bianca Lawson originally won the role of Cordelia Chase, but turned it down due to other contractual obligations. Lawson would later be cast as vampire slayer Kendra in the show's second season. Carpenter, proud of her own character's growth across the two series, did not envy Gellar for winning the role of Buffy over her.

== Characterization ==
=== Characteristics and analysis ===
Cordelia's representation of an assertive modern woman and her character arc in Buffy has been commented on in several academic texts, particularly in gender studies, such as "Praising Cordelia: Aggression and Adaptation Among Adolescent Girls", or Sex and the Slayer. In the latter, Dr. Lorna Jowett of the University of Northampton describes Cordelia's initial place in the series where "At first glance, Cordelia seems to have the 'normal life' Buffy often longs for. She is a familiar character from the teen drama: popular, a cheerleader, the center of cliques (power as status). Elizabeth Rambo notes how Cordelia's status is highlighted by her nickname, "Queen C", and Harmony's remark to her, "Cordy, you reign." Cordelia functions recognizably as the typical female victim of horror, often screaming and running away, and this makes her a perfect contrast for other female characters."

"Praising Cordelia" argues that both Buffy and Cordelia are representations of assertive and competitive young women, who "represent two kinds of aggressive adolescent girls". The article focuses on the competitive relationship between the characters. Buffy's initial friendship with Cordelia is compromised once Cordelia sees the attractive, socially competent Buffy as a threat to her. Even after Cordelia joins the Scooby Gang and becomes Buffy's friend, theirs is not a friendship of "mutual support, warmth, and intimacy" but rather one of "mutual antipathy". The authors opine that Cordelia, unlike Buffy, is a "representation of the archetypal 'feminine type'", one who conforms to the "pervasive stereotypes of femininity while, at the same time, dominating the other girls in the school" and commanding the attention of the boys. Describing her character arc in Buffy, Mary Alice Money views Cordelia as one of many transformed or redeemed Buffy characters, one who "reveals a previously unexpected vulnerability that nullifies some of their less attractive traits." Jowett argues that Cordelia's assimilation within the main group is due largely to her relationship with main character Xander, and she is rendered sympathetic to the audience once they witness her rebuff the peer pressure from her old friends. She is further endeared to the viewer when Xander betrays her because the scenes showing her pain are shown only to the viewer. After Cordelia is cheated on by Xander with Willow she chooses not to go back to him and instead retains her autonomy.

Others such as Susanne Kord and Elisabeth Krimer note how Cordelia is also a subversive representation of feminine stereotypes, describing "Although superficially, Cordelia conforms to the stereotype of the insensitive bitch", what she actually does is "offers her viewers the clandestine pleasures of female self-assertion". One of Cordelia's strongest traits, her honesty, is also highlighted in "Earshot", where Buffy temporarily develops telepathic powers and can hear the thoughts of her friends, who avoid her to hide these thoughts. For Cordelia however, "her thought processes and actual utterances are completely identical" and because of this, she embodies an "antithesis of female self-sacrifice" in these years but also "the opposite of the kind of hypocrisy that is typically attributed to women". Writer Jennifer Crusie interprets this as Cordelia's "lack of depth" becoming "her strength". She does not mean to argue that Cordelia is stupid, however, pointing out "Cordy's solipsism could easily be mistaken for stupidity, but it comes coupled with a keen intelligence and a fixity of purpose that makes her almost invincible." Jowett feels Cordelia's confidence is based in her wealth. Despite becoming more sympathetic as the series progressed, "bitchiness enhances Cordelia's comic appeal", as it offers viewers an opportunity to relish its honest truth-telling.

=== Development ===
==== The Buffy years ====
"I provide conflict, and that's what good drama needs."
— Charisma Carpenter on her role in Buffy the Vampire Slayer.

In early seasons of Buffy the Vampire Slayer, Cordelia was often used both as comic relief and occasionally for the damsel in distress plot device, which would require series' heroine Buffy to save her. Any concerns that she was simply one-dimensional were alleviated for the actress when writers developed the character through her relationships with Xander and later Wesley, which led Carpenter to become more convinced of her potential. In an article about the psychology of characters in Buffy the Vampire Slayer, Steven C. Schlozman writes about how "Cordelia is wealthy and, at first glance, superficial, appearing to care most about her own popularity. However, as the show progresses, we learn that her mother has myalgic encephalomyelitis/chronic fatigue syndrome (ME/CFS) and her father was prosecuted for income tax evasion. She is a reluctant participant, baffled at her own loyal feelings and bewildered at her attraction to the unpopular Xander." He goes on to describe how Cordelia, and "all the characters of Buffy the Vampire Slayer are particularly compelling for their depictions of important adolescent themes." Discussing Cordelia's relationship with Xander, Carpenter says, "A lot of Cordy's conflict, and a lot of who she is, comes out around Xander. Because she is in love with him in spite of herself, or in spite of him. I have my best moments with [Nicholas Brendon]." However, her character's growing involvement with Buffy and her friends caused the actress some concern; "I wasn't sure how I felt about it, because I didn't want to lose my edge. I didn't want her to be nice; I didn't want her to change because that's who she is." Carpenter's challenge was to find a balance between the good and bad sides of Cordelia, and she explains, "That's why I enjoy playing her so much. She's got to be somewhat tolerable or why would they hang out with her? But I [try] not to lose her edge, her honesty." Carpenter claims that Cordelia's "rough edges" made for difficult experiences with fans, who expected her to be snobby like her character. Charisma continually pleaded to get to slay a vampire, which the writers let her do in her final Buffy appearance, "Graduation Day, Part Two".

Following Cordelia's departure from Buffy, Whedon brought back the character of Anya (Emma Caulfield) for a recurring role from season 4 (and later as a series regular across seasons 5-7) to take on Cordelia's "wiseacre" role.

==== Angel seasons 1-3 ====
Over the course of her appearances in Angel, Cordelia would develop enormously as a character. Describing this evolution, Carpenter comments, "When I first started playing Cordelia, she wasn't nice. She has really deepened and has a stronger sense of responsibility. She's a team player, which was not the case in the beginning." Carpenter cherishes what playing a multi-faceted character like Cordelia meant for her as an actress, describing

The road Cordelia has traveled, the journey she has taken up to now has been such a joy to play as an actress, because there have been so many chances to do so many different emotions. Heroic, vulnerable, just angry, possessed, funny – I get to be all those different things rolled into one. Getting this role, in hindsight... God I made a good decision, or they did.

Cultural critic Jennifer Crusie points out how Cordelia was initially perfect for the transition to "selfish, superficial Los Angeles", which turned out to be her "trial by fire".

Executive producer David Greenwalt was very keen to acquire the character of Cordelia for the spin-off series, commenting, "I desperately wanted her to come to Angel because Angel being dark and broody, we need a big bright smile." At the same time, Whedon felt her presence was sorely missed in the fourth season of Buffy where "All of our characters got to the point where they were loving and hugging, and it was sort of like, where's Cordelia?", leading him to introduce Spike (James Marsters) to the cast to accommodate her absence. According to Marsters, his request for a salary equal to what he was paid on Buffy caused Whedon to remove Carpenter as a regular cast member.

Kelly A. Manners describes Cordelia as a "rich gal whose family ended up losing everything to the IRS. So in episode one of Angel, Cordelia showed up in LA trying to start a career as an actress because her family was in jail, actually." Crusie states that in mourning for Doyle Cordelia also begins "finding within herself a new level of humanity".

"Time and time again, [Cordelia] realize[s] what [her] calling truly is ... when [Cordelia] gets the pain of the world and the suffering that's out there, ... [she] realize[s] just how important it is that [she] stay[s] doing this mission alongside Angel."
— Charisma Carpenter on Cordelia's development in Angel.

Greenwalt discusses how Cordelia "is sort of forced to become a deeper character" when she starts to receive the visions of the suffering and helpless, "She's sort of living with one foot in the world of 'I want to be an actress' and with another foot in the world of 'I want to save and help people, and I have a deeper purpose and mission.'" Greenwalt felt that this development allowed Cordelia to develop from a "vainglorious high schooler to someone who's almost like a superhero"; this also provided Carpenter with the opportunity to stretch her potential as an actress. From the tenth episode, "Parting Gifts", Cordelia begins to actively function as a supernatural character in the series while the introduction of Wesley also contributes some added comic relief to the series. It is from this episode Cordelia is also forced to mature as she mourns the death of Doyle, whose visions serve as a painful reminder of him. The first-season finale saw Cordelia's visions inflict all the suffering of the human world upon her, and to effectively act this, Carpenter's acting coach showed her pictures of real human pain as motivation. The scene took over eight hours to film, and Carpenter was relieved when it was over. The experience saw Cordelia further resolve to help those in need, stating "I saw the world and there's so much pain. We have to help them." Carpenter explains, "Through the suffering of the world, and through her own experiences, she discovers what's important in life."

Carpenter pleaded to the producers to let her cut her hair in the second season of Angel, but they were dissatisfied with the darker tone and cut which created a "dark edge of Cordelia" which wasn't as "warm and effervescent as she usually is", so for the third season they wanted her to "go shorter and blonder". Angel's third season demonstrates Cordelia's development into a full-fledged heroine. The episode "Birthday" saw her being offered the chance to live a life where she never met Angel, but her inner desire to help others sees her sacrifice this life and her humanity to become a half-demon who can better withstand the visions she carries. In "Billy", Cordelia begins to train alongside Angel to become a better fighter and learns quickly. Carpenter began to train extensively with the show's stunt co-ordinators both to learn how to fight and to handle weaponry. In the episode "Waiting in the Wings", both Angel and Lorne remark on what a fine woman Cordelia has finally become, with Cordelia noting she is more like a superhero than she ever expected to be growing up in Sunnydale. Also in this episode, she and Angel both realize they have fallen for one another, but their love goes unconsummated. Critically, Jennifer Crusie considers Cordelia's ascension to the heavens at the end of season 3 to be the "point that the Mutant Enemy Productions writers evidently lost their minds". She goes on to describe how Cordelia's compliance with Skip seems entirely out of character. Jes Battis also argues that a paradox is created when "the character who embraces her privilege (Cordelia) gets to become a higher being and exit Angel, and as an overwhelmingly positive force" where later Fred (Amy Acker), "the character who is conflicted about her privilege" in season 5 "ends up being possessed by a millennia-old demon".

==== Angel seasons 4-5 ====
Angel season 4 played with audience's expectations of the now heroic Cordelia by revealing her to be the season's Big Bad; it was later established that Cordelia had been possessed by a manipulative deity called Jasmine. The storyline was controversial with fans, and Carpenter has admitted hating how a possessed Cordelia seduced Angel's teenage son. Carpenter has said, "I'm in denial about that whole storyline. It was creepy." She tried to keep a positive attitude about the situation, though; director Terrence O'Hara commented that he thought Carpenter had "a lot of fun" playing a manipulative Cordelia in the episode "Orpheus" because she enjoyed coming up with Cordelia's new "schizophrenic madwoman" characterization. David Boreanaz was also unsettled by the incestuous pairing. At a 2004 convention, he admitted that the season 4 storyline "freaked him out." The episode "Inside Out" saw the height of this inversion of Cordelia's character, where she is seen urging Connor to murder an innocent girl in order to expedite the birth of the child they conceived together. In an effort to stop Connor, the Powers That Be send the spirit of Connor's mother Darla (Julie Benz) to convince him not to go through with it. The episode sees Carpenter dressed in black, while Benz appears in heavenly white as she becomes the voice of reason and morality. Steven S. DeKnight, who wrote and directed the episode, felt this was a brilliant role-reversal for both actresses as Carpenter is accustomed to playing the benevolent Cordelia where Darla is normally seen as a sinister vampire. Much of season 4's storyline had to be adjusted due to Carpenter's real-life pregnancy; after Cordelia gives birth to Jasmine in the episode "Inside Out" she is left in a coma for the remainder of the fourth season. Crusie discusses what she felt were the flaws in the execution of the fourth season,

It's that she betrays the man she trusts above all others and who trusts her absolutely; it's that she seduces a boy she once diapered; it's that she dresses like a drag queen and talks like a Dynasty reject. It's that she's not Cordy, and what might have been fun to watch had we been let into the secret before the Beastmaster seduced Connor becomes the extended rape and death of a much-beloved character.

Matt Hills and Rebecca Williams also discuss the treatment of Cordelia (and Darla) in "Angel's Monstrous Mothers and Vampires with Soul: Investigating the Abject in 'Television Horror'", from Reading Angel: The TV Spin-off With a Soul by Stacey Abbot. They see the send-offs of Cordelia, Fred and other characters as part of a pattern of highly gendered "elaborated abjection" seen in Angel. They also see Cordelia's possession in season 4 as part of a recurring pattern: "More so than other characters in [Buffy] and Angel, Cordelia has suffered or been threatened with bodily invasion and rape, either symbolically or literally" and recounts the demon impregnation in "Expecting", and similarly in "Epiphany", where she develops a gestating demon in her head and then told she must mate with the Groosalugg in "Through the Looking Glass". Cordelia even remarks on this, as Hills and Williams quote her as she remarks on her "status as a violated and devalued character"; Cordelia states, "If you ever figure out how to get us out of here, I want you to find me a dimension where some demon doesn't want to impregnate me with his spawn!" They liken the horror motif in these examples, and in "Inside Out", to what Barbara Creed called the 'monstrous womb' in her book The Monstrous-feminine: Film, Feminism, Psychoanalysis. Jes Battis also comments how, in comparison with the Fred-Illyria season 5 storyline, Cordelia's storyline is not as positive as Fred's rebirth, because Fred got to "'live on' through Illyria, whereas Cordelia is taken right out of the show and receives no interesting blue-haired reincarnation". Continuing, they say that in fact, there is no meaningful connection between the "real" Cordelia and Jasmine, as the Cordelia who did those bad things is killed the moment Jasmine is, "and the 'true' Cordy wakes up from her coma". Further illustrating the comparisons, "Fred/Illyria become a joined mother/daughter subjectivity, a dual being whose constituent essences are inseparable; Cordelia is never so intimately connected with her evil child and is remembered as the healthy, vibrant Cordy that everyone knew." Pointing out symbolic parallels in the subtexts of these gestations, Battis notes

Cordelia, a vocal advocate of her own privilege, creates a fully formed supernatural being, Jasmine, who attempts (shockingly) to control the world. Fred, on the other hand, who internalizes her own privilege and cannot express it except in terms of insecurity and awkwardness, has her body devoured from the inside by the demon Illyria.

For Angel's fifth season, as with Buffy's fourth, Spike steps in to replace Cordelia as a source of comedic dialogue within the series. It is also noted by critics that, in the fifth season, "it doesn't take long for Illyria to become a version of Cordelia, giving everyone the cold and honest truth whether they want it or not". Concerning Cordelia's last appearance in Angel's fifth and final season, Joss Whedon says he used the 100th episode to reinforce the "mission statement" of the show, as well as assess where the characters are now compared to how they began. Whedon explains this episode presents an ideal opportunity to—through Cordelia, who was "there at the beginning"—ask of Angel, "Where are you now? Where were you when you started and where are you now and how do you feel about that?" The return to the show's "original concerns" is echoed by the flashback to Doyle's first season advertisement; Sara Upstone points out aerial images of Los Angeles reappear at the same time Cordelia tells Angel "You forgot who you are," bringing back the show's link to the city. Buffy Summers was originally intended to appear in the 100th episode to get Angel 'back on track', but Sarah Michelle Gellar had other obligations. Writer/director David Fury explains that since "we couldn't get Sarah" the episode was instead written for Cordelia. He adds, "This turned out to be a Godsend because Charisma was fantastic." In the original script, Fury wrote a conversation between Wesley and Angel while driving to the hospital that set up Cordelia as a possible vegetable. The scene was never shot because "the shock of seeing her up and around after a 9-month coma was enough. We just didn't want to tip it too soon," says Fury.

== Reception ==
For her role as Cordelia Chase, as she appeared in the television series Angel, Charisma Carpenter has been nominated four times by the Saturn Awards. Carpenter earned back-to-back nominations in 2000 and 2001 for Best Genre TV Supporting Actress and Best Actress on Television, respectively. The actress did not receive any nominations in 2002, but again obtained two back-to-back nominations in 2003 and 2004 for Best Actress in a Television Series and Best Supporting Actress in a Television Series, respectively.

== Cultural impact ==
The character of Cordelia Chase has been credited by some for making the mean girl, queen bee trope more likeable. Gillian Bennett wrote about Cordelia Chase in Paste Magazine noting, "The good old-fashioned high school mean girl; we all know them and may (secretly) love them. Regina George. Blair Waldorf. Girls who stomp around with their minions, shoving aside anyone in their way and harboring a—usually inexplicable—hatred for the female protagonist. What has made these mean girls, at sixteen, so bitter to the world and to others? The answer is almost never revealed before she is inevitably defeated by the “good girl,” but Buffy the Vampire Slayer gives us a rare glimpse beneath the cold mask of the mean girl with Cordelia Chase."

Angelica Jade Bastién included Cordelia in the inspirations for the character Cheryl Blossom from the Riverdale show in an article written in Vulture. She suggested that Cordelia is one of the most famous pop culture queen bees. In the Glamour article, Leeann Duggan wrote about the character Veronica Lodge by citing Cordelia as one of the examples of the trope which the character represents. She also put Cordelia and her counterpart Buffy Summers as one of the most prominent examples of the "Blonde versus brunette rivalry". CherryPicks, when talking about the term "Girlboss", wrote "When we think about classic girlbosses, iconic characters come to mind: Blair Waldorf (Leighton Meester) from Gossip Girl, Cordelia Chase (Charisma Carpenter) from Buffy the Vampire Slayer, and Daenerys Targaryen (Emilia Clarke) from Game of Thrones.".

Alexis Gunderson wrote an article named "Chasing Cordelia : The Rise of The Mean Girl heroine from Buffy to Pretty Little Liars" in Paste Magazine. In the article, Alexis claimed that Charisma Carpenter's Cordelia begun the tradition of the Mean Girl heroine seen in so many TV shows quoting Caroline Forbes (Candice King) from The Vampire Diaries, Rebekah Mikaelson (Claire Holt) from The Originals, Lydia Martin (Holland Roden) and Malia Tate (Shelley Hennig) from Teen Wolf, Petra Solano (Yael Grobglas) from Jane the Virgin, Lauren Cooper (Catherine Tate) from The Catherine Tate Show. "What defines the Cordelia Chase-style Mean Girl Heroine is her ambivalent, tempestuous alliance with the Scooby Gang at her series’ core, an ambivalence heightened by the Mean Girl’s certainty that she is just as good as—if not better than!—the allies and assumptions the protagonist arms herself with. This Mean Girl/Alpha Bitch not only could be but should be the heroine of the story being told." say Alexis about the character and her influence.

The Valnet site Collider ranked Cordelia 8th in the list of "Best Mean Girls On Television", citing "Unquestionably one of television's most well-known mean girls, Buffy the Vampire Slayer's Cordelia Chase (Charisma Carpenter) is renowned for her razor-sharp humor, stinging remarks, and unshakable dedication to upholding her social position. Cordelia's meanness is a central facet of her character, and she embraces her role as Sunnydale High's resident queen bee with gusto." The site Comic Book Resources published an article talking about how the show Legacies took inspiration from Buffy quoting "It is near impossible not to compare this to the Buffy Season 3 episode, "The Wish," where Cordelia (Charisma Carpenter), who is equally vain as Lizzie, wishes Buffy never came to Sunnydale. Both episodes take a character on a journey to discover life would be worse, only for things to be corrected in the end." stating how Jenny Boyd's Lizzie Saltzman was a successor of Cordelia Chase. Vulture quote Cordelia as the predecessor to Prudence Blackwood in Chilling Adventures of Sabrina.
