= Vladimir Kulich =

Czech actor (born 1956)

Vladimír Kulich
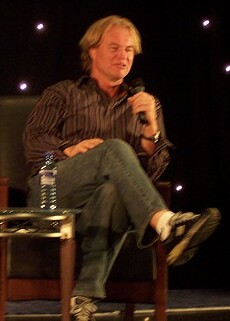
- Kulich in 2005
- Born: 14 July 1956 (age 70); Prague, Czechoslovakia (now Czech Republic)
- Occupation: Actor

Vladimír Kulich (born 14 July 1956) is a Czech-Canadian actor.

He is known for his roles as Buliwyf in the film The 13th Warrior, Tiberius in the film Ironclad, Erik in the television series Vikings, as well as the voice of Ulfric Stormcloak in The Elder Scrolls V: Skyrim and as The Beast in the television series Angel. In 1995 he appeared as Olafsson in the X-Files episode "Død Kalm."

While living in Montreal, Quebec, Canada as a young adult, he was a professional ice hockey player. He has often volunteered in celebrity charity games including skating with the Los Angeles Kings Alumni Association.

== Early life (1956–1977) ==
Kulich was born in Prague, Czechoslovakia to a family that was already involved in the acting industry. His uncle operated a theater company in the city, which allowed the young Kulich to experience what the stage was like. Kulich visited the theatre often, and when he was approximately five years of age, his uncle allowed him to run errands, which mostly involved fetching pitchers of beer between intermissions. Kulich became interested in acting and believed that an acting career would be his future. He began by performing in various small parts in the State Theatre of Czechoslovakia. His first paying job as an actor was in a low-budget Czech film as a crying boy who had lost his balloon. However, his acting career was soon set back by his parents' divorce and the subsequent relocation of Kulich and his mother to Montreal, Quebec, Canada.

Kulich was twelve years old when he and his mother settled in Quebec. He and his mother eventually took up residence in a tenement located in the poorest segment of their otherwise financially comfortable neighborhood. However, Kulich was disheartened to discover that no theaters or other acting opportunities existed in the immediate area. He therefore turned to hockey as a pastime. As his mother struggled to find work, Kulich became more engaged in the sport.

As Kulich became more dedicated to ice skating, he temporarily gave up acting. In his ice skating, he was offered additional encouragement from John Ferguson, Sr., who was a notable Montreal Canadiens' player and frequent audience member of Kulich's games. Ferguson developed an affinity for the boy, and, upon becoming head coach for the New York Rangers, he offered Kulich the opportunity to try out for the team. Kulich failed to make the cut, but soon he began playing for one of the team's minor league farming affiliates at Port Huron, Michigan. Despite the continued possibility of being called up, Kulich opted to retire from professional hockey after a year at 21 years of age.

== Early film and television work (1978–1999) ==
After voluntarily ending his hockey career, Kulich explored a variety of callings. He took a job at a summer camp that catered to handicapped children, began reading more, and tried his hand at painting. Unable to find a definite focus, Kulich eventually moved to Vancouver, British Columbia, where he started a whitewater river rafting business located near Chilliwack, B.C. Kulich would serve as owner, operator, and occasional guide for the rugged outings over the course of the next ten years. In time, it was this venture that helped to reopen another important door. In Vancouver, the acting industry was gaining momentum. Some had even dubbed the city "Hollywood North" because of the burgeoning number of television and film projects in development there. One weekend, a couple of producers from the program 21 Jump Street scheduled a whitewater rafting trip with Kulich's company and were impressed by the unique look of the Czech-Canadian. They offered to give him a small role on an episode of their show, which Kulich accepted. The part was nothing of note. Kulich appeared as a doorman, speaking only a single word of welcome to those with whom he shared the scene. Still, it was enough to reintroduce Kulich to the world of acting and put him on the road to even greater recognition.

Before long, Kulich began to land guest-starring roles on other television programs such as MacGyver and Wiseguy. In January 1990, he decided to try his luck in Hollywood and drove from Vancouver to Los Angeles, California with the intention of giving himself one month to get his foot in the proverbial door. Relying on his rafting business to keep him grounded, Kulich knew he would need to return to Canada in the spring to get the operation up and running if the move didn't work out. The month had nearly drawn to a close when Kulich finally received a call indicating that he had been accepted by an agent. Still constrained by practicality, Kulich decided to give himself an additional month to find work. His agent directed him to an audition for the television miniseries The Big One: The Great Los Angeles Earthquake. The experience left Kulich feeling somewhat daunted due to the perceived lack of interest his efforts had been shown, and he elected to return to Vancouver a few days earlier than originally planned. Despite his departure, the undertaking still proved successful. As the month was ending, he received a call informing him that he was needed back in L.A. He had gotten the part.

Through the mid-1990s, Kulich continued to pursue work in feature film projects as well as guest-starring roles on various television programs. Opting to remain based primarily in Vancouver, he worked steadily, making appearances on such shows as The Commish and Highlander. He made the most memorable appearance of his early career on The X-Files, portraying the only unaffected crewmember of a ship caught up in supernatural circumstances. The episode, which required Kulich to learn lines in Norwegian, was to be the actor's first truly rewarding production experience. Once again, his thoughts turned irresistibly to Hollywood. Though he enjoyed living in Canada, the allure of L.A. and the possibility of achieving even greater success there simply could not be ignored. Kulich obtained his green card and made his move to the US soon after.

=== The 13th Warrior ===
Upon relocating, Kulich found himself struggling financially. After repeatedly being sent to audition for roles as Nazis and terrorists he had grown so dissatisfied with his agent that he fired him without bothering to arrange for other representation first. Shortly thereafter, as Kulich was considering his options, his ex-agent contacted him. Though Kulich was technically no longer his client, a Viking-themed film had just come to his attention for which he felt the actor might be perfect. The project was called Eaters of the Dead, though the title would later be changed to The 13th Warrior. Kulich was told very little about the production and the audition was similarly low-key. Two months passed before he was informed that the director, John McTiernan, wished to meet with him. By the time of his screen test, Kulich had recognized the potential of the high-profile project and had hopes that it would provide him with the "big break" he needed. Filming was lengthy and arduous at times, taking place amongst the familiar landscapes of British Columbia. Despite having never ridden a horse prior to portraying Buliwyf, a character based loosely upon the mythical hero Beowulf, Kulich naturally took to the role. When the movie finally hit theaters in the summer of 1999, his contributions did not go unnoticed by audiences and critics alike. Unfortunately, the film never lived up to its initial promise due in part to creative differences between producer/author Michael Crichton and McTiernan, the eventual departure of the latter from the project, and the studio's resultant hesitancy to promote the finished product. Still, the experience was a favorable one for Kulich, earning him newfound recognition and a larger, more pronounced fan base. In subsequent years, his performance would prove to be a veritable stepping stone on the path to other significant roles as well.

== 2000–present ==
After completing work on The 13th Warrior, Kulich returned to the Czech Republic with his earnings and considered buying a home there and quietly retiring. In the end, he decided to continue his US acting career, though the trip did serve to reignite his interest in his heritage and strengthen his ties to his homeland.

Once back in LA, Kulich resumed his search for prominent film and television roles. In 2002, he received a call regarding just such a part. When casting agents for the television series Angel, a Buffy the Vampire Slayer spin-off, first contacted Kulich about portraying The Beast, the actor knew little about the show. He was aware of it, however, thanks to having shared the same manager as the program's star, David Boreanaz, for a year. Upon reading for the role, Kulich was shown concept art depicting the character. Initially, he was a bit apprehensive. The part would oblige him to be buried in prosthetics, make-up and an elaborate costume, the combination of which would render him utterly unrecognizable. Only his voice would remain unaltered. Still, he realized that being considered for such a role demonstrated an inherent trust in his acting abilities with little regard for much else. After arriving for a subsequent reading, Kulich was approached by the show's executive story editor, Mere Smith, who took a moment to express her appreciation for his performance in The 13th Warrior. Though he was still less-than-excited about what was sure to be an exhausting production schedule, Kulich was reassured by the compliment and accepted the part. The recurring role of The Beast spanned eight episodes during Angel's 2002-2003 season, with the shooting taking place over an 11-week period in the fall. Kulich’s on-set transformations involved a fiberglass bodysuit which weighed roughly 50 lb and took an hour to don in addition to the elaborate make-up and prosthetics, which required four hours to apply. But it was the accompanying silver dollar-sized contacts that caused him the most anxiety. Kulich had recently undergone laser eye surgery to correct a vision problem and was worried that the contacts might inadvertently cause damage. Though the costume left him feeling cocooned, the experience was ultimately a positive one, providing Kulich with a great deal more promotion as an actor than he had received for The 13th Warrior. Additionally, it gave him the opportunity to share his first on-screen kiss with Angel co-star Charisma Carpenter.

In the wake of his stint on Angel, Kulich appeared at a few fan gatherings and conventions including the February 2003 Posting Board Party that raised $30,000 for the Greater Los Angeles Chapter of the Make-A-Wish Foundation. He was also a noted guest at the June 2005 Starfury: Quor'Toth convention in London, England. In May 2004, Kulich again signaled his intention to give back to fans and aspiring artists alike by signing on as a guest speaker for 15 Minutes Plus, an entertainment industry symposium that took place at the University of Southern California and offered workshops and demonstrations on such topics as film, theatre, music, animation and screenwriting.

Kulich returned to acting in late 2005 when he was offered the role of the enigmatic character known only as The Swede in the action movie Smokin' Aces. Though his screen time was limited, he was a significant figure within the context of the film's story. Upon first meeting with Kulich, Joe Carnahan, the project's writer and director, professed his admiration for the actor's work in The 13th Warrior and did not hesitate in offering him the job. When released in theaters in early 2007, Smokin' Aces was considered a moderate financial success and has since garnered even greater attention on DVD. A direct to DVD prequel has been announced for which Kulich has been approached.

In 2006, Kulich initiated a meeting with his two half-brothers, his father's sons from a subsequent remarriage. Prior to establishing contact, the three had never met or spoken, and Kulich had known little about them beyond the fact that they shared his last name. Once the siblings had taken the time to become acquainted, they agreed to cement their new relationship by forming a production company, Charles Bridge Productions, based in Prague. The name refers to the Charles Bridge, a historic structure within Prague which dates back to 1357 and is one of the city's most famous landmarks. Kulich intends for the venture to provide assistance to foreign companies seeking to utilize his homeland for future film projects.

Kulich portrayed the leader of the Danish mercenaries, Tiberius, in the 2011 independent film Ironclad. The movie's plot centers on King John's siege of Rochester Castle in the year 1215.

In 2011, Kulich voiced Ulfric Stormcloak, the leader of the Stormcloak rebellion, in Bethesda Softworks' critically acclaimed video game The Elder Scrolls V: Skyrim.

== Other interests, activities, and charity appearances ==
As a result of his travels, Kulich speaks four languages fluently—Czech, French, English, and Hungarian. He has expressed an interest in someday writing and developing his own film projects and possibly taking a turn in the director's chair as well. But Kulich has also never forgotten the athletic pursuits of his youth. Though he no longer plays hockey professionally, he remains an avid fan of the sport. Of late, Kulich has made a return of sorts to the game, which he considers to be a form of nostalgic physical therapy. His talents have been put to good use as a participant in numerous charity match-ups sponsored by the Los Angeles Kings and their Alumni Association. Among the more prominent of these were the 2005, 2006, and 2007 "Freeze the Disease" Pro/Celebrity Hockey Games. The Freeze the Disease Foundation is a volunteer organization that sponsors an annual "friendly" hockey match-up benefiting children and young adults suffering from cystic fibrosis.

A devout dog lover, especially of large breeds Kulich has adopted multiple dogs from animal shelters over the years. His dog Spanky, a 95 lb pit bull terrier, was permitted to visit Kulich on the set of Angel during his last day of filming for the series and was welcomed warmly by series star David Boreanaz, who also has a soft spot in his heart for canines. Kulich has been known to lend his time to a rescue organization that uses behavioral psychology to rehabilitate pit bulls that have been abused. Additionally, the actor has developed a profound appreciation for architecture, and has participated in several house renovation projects. Though he has been trained to tackle woodworking and electrical tasks, his favorite aspect is house redesign, which includes such major alterations as removing walls to add more space. The work has helped to supplement his income at times and has proven to be therapeutic as well. Kulich has also taken the time to indulge his musical side by learning to play the guitar. He has written songs for the instrument, though strictly for his own amusement.

Kulich has been an aficionado of motorcycles for many years, an interest that his father also shared. The actor did, however, suffer a rather serious motorcycle accident in late April 2007 while riding in Prague. His injuries, which included a ruptured spleen and five broken ribs, required a three-day hospital stay that was extended to ten days after he suffered an allergic reaction to the pain medication he was being given. On reflection, Kulich views the incident as a life-changing experience and has stated his gratefulness for having survived it.

== Filmography ==
Films
Year	Title	Role	Note
1990	The Big One: The Great Los Angeles Earthquake	William De Bruin	
1993	Necronomicon: Book of the Dead	Villager	
1994	Red Scorpion 2	Hans	
1994	Crackerjack	Stephan	
1995	Deceptions II: Edge of Deception	Allan Stadler	
1995	Decoy	Daniel	
1996	Crash (aka: Breach of Trust, Dirty Money)	Floyd Bracco	
1996	Pandora's Clock (aka: Doomsday Virus)	Yuri, The Terrorist	
1998	Firestorm	Karge	
1999	The 13th Warrior	Buliwyf The Leader	
2000	California Quake (aka: Ground Zero)	Bateman	
2003	It's a Pug's Life: The Documentary	Himself	
2003	The Only Witness (aka: Silence, Dead Silence)	Josef	
2007	Smokin' Aces	Dr. Sven "The Swede" Ingstrom	
2011	Ironclad	Tiberius	
2014	The Equalizer	Vladimir Pushkin	
2017	Savage Dog	Hans Steiner	
2018	The Debt Collector	Thomas "Big Tommy" Kowolski	
2020	Debt Collectors	Thomas "Big Tommy" Kowolski	
2020	The Legion	Marcus	

Television
Year	Title	Role	Note
1989	Booker	Craven	Episode: "Flat Out"
1989	Wiseguy	Scarpo	Episode: "A Rightful Place"
1989	MacGyver	Hans Kreese / Mr. Mammon	Episodes: "Fraternity of Thieves", "Legend of the Holy Rose: Part 1" and "Legend of the Holy Rose: Part 2"
1989	Neon Rider		Episodes: "Dude: Parts 1 & 2" (Pilot movie)
1992	Knots Landing	Thug	Episode: "Baths and Showers"
1992	Highlander	Pauling	Episode: "A Bad Day in Building A"
1992	The Commish	Otto	Episodes: "Adventures in the Skin Trade: Part 1" and "Adventures in the Skin Trade: Part 2"
1994	M.A.N.T.I.S.	Liakos	Episode: "Gloves Off"
1995	The X-Files	Olafsson	Episode: "Død Kalm"
1999	Seven Days	Ivan Mironov	Episode: "Sister's Keeper"
2002–2003	Angel	The Beast	Episodes: "Spin the Bottle", "Apocalypse, Nowish", "Habeas Corpses", "Long Day's Journey", "Awakening", "Soulless", "Calvary" and "Salvage"
2013	Vikings	Erik	Episodes: "Wrath of the Northmen", "Dispossessed" and "Trial"

Video games
Year	Title	Role	Note
2011	The Elder Scrolls V: Skyrim	Ulfric Stormcloak	Voice
2013	Tomb Raider	Nikolai / Solarii	Voice
2023	Starfield	Evgeny Rokov / Terrormorph Thrall (Male)	Voice
