= Sean Astin =

American actor (born 1971)

- Astin at Dragon Con in 2026

4th National President of SAG–AFTRA
- Incumbent
- Assumed office September 12, 2025
- Preceded by: Fran Drescher

Personal details
- Born: Sean Patrick Duke; February 25, 1971 (age 55) Santa Monica, California, U.S.
- Party: Democratic
- Spouse: Christine Harrell (m. 1992)
- Children: 3
- Parents: Patty Duke (mother); John Astin (adoptive father)
- Relatives: Mackenzie Astin (brother); Alexander Astin (adoptive uncle); Allen V. Astin (adoptive grandfather)
- Education: University of California, Los Angeles (BA); American University (MPA)(MPP)
- Occupation: Actor
- Website: seanastin.com
- Years active: 1981–present

Sean Patrick Astin (né Duke; born February 25, 1971) is an American actor and trade union leader who serves as the fourth national president of SAG-AFTRA. He began his career as a child actor, making his film debut as Mikey Walsh in The Goonies (1985), followed by significant roles as Billy Tepper in Toy Soldiers (1991), Dave Morgan in Encino Man (1992), Daniel Ruettiger in Rudy (1993), and Samwise Gamgee in The Lord of the Rings trilogy (2001–2003).

He is known to television audiences for portraying Lynn McGill on the fifth season of 24 (2006), the voice of Oso in Special Agent Oso (2009–2012), the voice of Raphael on Teenage Mutant Ninja Turtles (2012–2017), and Bob Newby on the second season of Stranger Things (2017).

Astin's acting awards include a Screen Actors Guild Award and two Young Artist Awards. He was also nominated for the Academy Award for Best Live Action Short Film in 1994 for the short film Kangaroo Court. Astin is the son of actress Patty Duke and was adopted in 1972 by her then-husband, actor John Astin.

Astin ran for president of SAG-AFTRA in 2025 and was elected for a two-year term. His term began in September 2025.

== Early life and education ==
Astin was born in Santa Monica, California, on February 25, 1971, the son of actress Patty Duke (1946–2016) and Michael Tell (1944/1945–2025). At the time, it was incorrectly reported that entertainer Desi Arnaz Jr. was his biological father. Tell was a writer, music promoter, and publisher of the newspaper The Las Vegas Israelite. When Duke became pregnant, she was unsure whether Tell, Arnaz or actor John Astin was the father, and Tell offered to marry her as a way out of the scandal. The marriage lasted only 13 days in 1970, ending before Astin was born.

In 1972, Duke married John Astin. When the wedding guests were invited to speak, 18-month-old Astin looked at John and cried, "Daddy!", to which the Episcopal priest performing the ceremony remarked, "Well, that about does it!" John subsequently adopted Sean. In 1973, Duke gave birth to Astin's half-brother Mackenzie Astin, who also became an actor. Duke and John Astin divorced in 1985. Duke married Mike Pearce in 1986, and they adopted a son, Kevin, in 1989. When Astin was 14, Duke told him that Arnaz was his biological father. Almost a decade later, in 1994, Astin met Tell's niece, who suggested that Astin get a paternity test. Tell was found to be his biological father. Astin developed close relationships with all three, saying: "Desi Arnaz Jr. loves me, and I love him." Astin considers John his father, as John raised him. Astin is also close to his stepfather, Mike Pearce, saying, "I can call any of them on the phone any time I want to. John, Desi, Mike, or Papa Mike ... my four dads."

Astin is of German and Irish ancestry through his mother, and Jewish ancestry through his biological father. Astin attended Catholic school and later became a Protestant.

Astin is a graduate of the Crossroads High School for the Arts in Santa Monica and completed master classes in acting at the Stella Adler Conservatory in Los Angeles. He attended Los Angeles Valley College before transferring to UCLA, where he graduated cum laude with a bachelor of arts in history and English (American literature and culture).

== Career ==
=== Early career ===
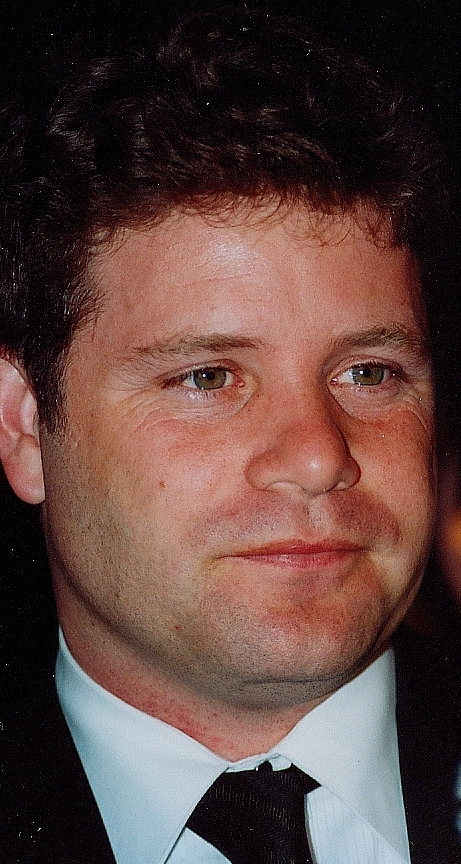
Astin in 1997

Astin's first acting role was in a 1981 television film titled Please Don't Hit Me, Mom, in which he played an eight-year-old child with an abusive mother (portrayed by his real-life mother Patty Duke). Astin made his film debut at age 13 as Mikey Walsh in The Goonies (1985).

After The Goonies, Astin appeared in several more films, including the Disney television film The B.R.A.T. Patrol, opposite Nia Long, Tim Thomerson, and Brian Keith; Like Father Like Son (1987); White Water Summer with Kevin Bacon (1987), The War of the Roses (1989); the World War II film Memphis Belle (1990); Toy Soldiers (1991); Encino Man (1992); and the college football biopic Rudy (1993), about the life-changing struggles and rewards of the titular character, Daniel Ruettiger.

In 1994, Astin directed and co-produced (with his wife, Christine Astin) the short film Kangaroo Court, which received an Academy Award nomination for Best Live Action Short Film. Astin continued to appear in films throughout the 1990s, including the Showtime science fiction film Harrison Bergeron (1995), the Gulf War film Courage Under Fire (1996), and the Warren Beatty political satire Bulworth (1998).

=== The Lord of the Rings ===
In the early 2000s, Astin played Samwise Gamgee in Peter Jackson's The Lord of the Rings film trilogy, consisting of The Fellowship of the Ring (2001), The Two Towers (2002), and The Return of the King (2003). He also voiced Gamgee in the video game tie-in to The Return of the King. Many awards were bestowed upon the trilogy, particularly its final installment, which earned eleven Academy Awards, including Best Picture. Astin received seven award nominations for his own performance, and won five, including the Saturn Award, the Sierra Award, the Seattle Film Critics Award, and the Utah Film Critics Award (all for Best Supporting Actor), and the Visual Effects Society Award for Outstanding Performance by a Male or Female in an Effects Film. The Return of the King cast as an ensemble received awards from the National Board of Review of Motion Pictures, the Screen Actors Guild, the Broadcast Film Critics Association, and received a Gold Derby Award. Throughout the filming process, Astin became close friends with several cast members, particularly Elijah Wood. Astin's daughter Alexandra is in the closing scene of The Return of the King, playing his onscreen daughter, Elanor.

While working on The Lord of the Rings, Astin persuaded a number of fellow cast and crew members, including director Peter Jackson, to assist him in making his second short film, The Long and Short of It. The film, which takes place on a street in Wellington, New Zealand, premiered at the 2003 Sundance Film Festival and can be found on the DVD for The Two Towers, along with a "making of" video.

In 2004, Astin released There and Back Again (ISBN 0-312-33146-0), a memoir (co-written with Joe Layden) of his film career with emphasis on his experiences during production of The Lord of the Rings trilogy. The title is derived from the title of J. R. R. Tolkien's novel The Hobbit, as well as the fictional book written by Bilbo Baggins in The Lord of the Rings.

=== After The Lord of the Rings ===
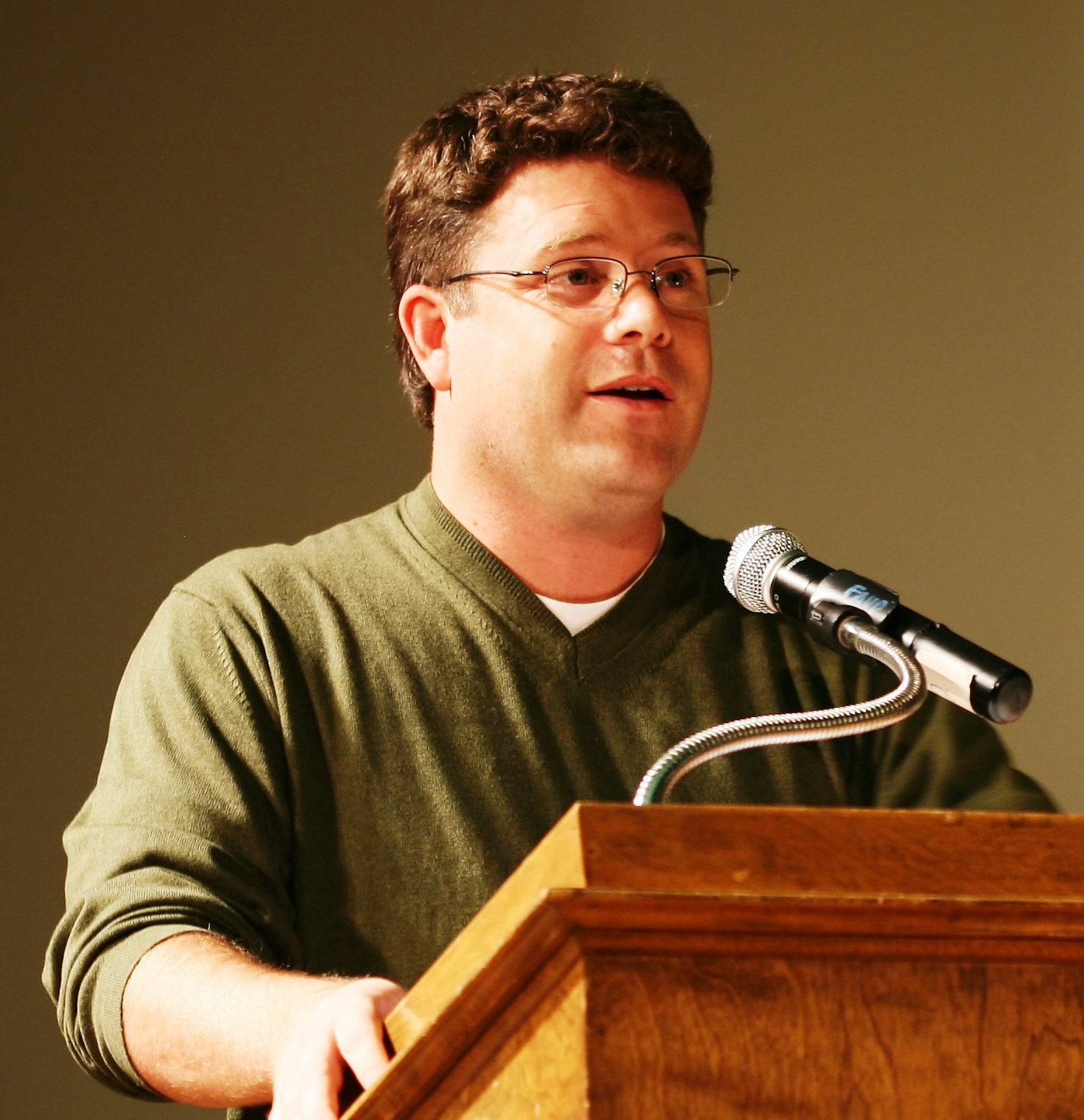
Astin at UIUC in 2009

Since The Lord of the Rings, Astin has continued to work in film and television. His film roles have included the Adam Sandler comedies 50 First Dates and Click. Astin played the role of Malibu High School principal Mike Matthews in the film Smile.

In television, Astin guest-starred as Lynn McGill in ten episodes of the fifth season of the Fox drama 24. He also appeared in the made-for-TV films Hercules and The Colour of Magic and in episodes of Monk, Las Vegas, My Name Is Earl (in which he parodied his 1993 film Rudy with co-stars Charles S. Dutton and Chelcie Ross), and Law & Order, among other shows. Astin directed a 2003 episode of the TV series Angel, titled "Soulless". He played the enigmatic Mr. Smith on the second season of the Showtime series Jeremiah.

Astin's career has also expanded to include voice-over roles. He narrated the American version of the Animal Planet series Meerkat Manor, and voices the title character in Special Agent Oso which aired on Playhouse Disney from 2009 to 2011 and Disney Junior from 2011 to early 2014. Astin's other voice work includes Balto III: Wings of Change, in which he voiced Kodi, a teenage husky who is the son of the titular character, and the video game Kingdom Hearts, in the latter of which he provided the voice of Hercules, replacing actor Tate Donovan, who was unavailable but would return for Kingdom Hearts II. Astin also voiced Raphael in the Teenage Mutant Ninja Turtles animated series on Nickelodeon, which premiered on September 29, 2012, running for five seasons and 124 episodes, and ending on November 12, 2017.

In 2010, Astin joined the Stella Adler Los Angeles Theatre Collective acting company. Also as of 2010, Astin and his wife, Christine, were making a film based on Lois Lowry's Newbery Medal-winning novel Number the Stars. They bought the film rights in 2008 and wrote a screenplay adaptation, with plans to direct and produce it themselves.

In March 2012, Astin played a cosmetic surgeon named Takin Mastuhmik in a fake trailer entitled Boobathon which appeared on Funny or Die. In March 2014, Astin played a soldier in Boys of Abu Ghraib, a military thriller inspired by the events that made worldwide news in 2004. In June of that year, he began playing the role of Jim Kent on the FX drama The Strain.

In October 2015, Astin played Hank Erwin in Woodlawn, a story about how a high school football team overcame racism and hate, and found unity and success through following Jesus.

In 2017, Astin played the role of Bob Newby in season two of the Netflix series Stranger Things. In 2019, Astin reprised the role of Newby in flashback scenes during the series' third season, played the role of Dr. Greg Pemberton on several episodes of The Big Bang Theory, and had a guest appearance on the fifth season of Supergirl. In 2019, he was in the Netflix dramedy No Good Nick in which he played Ed. That same year, he appeared in the sixth season of Brooklyn Nine-Nine.

In May 2020, Astin joined Josh Gad's YouTube series Reunited Apart, which reunites the casts of popular films through video-conferencing and promotes donations to non-profit charities. Others in the episode were fellow The Lord of the Rings castmates Sean Bean, Orlando Bloom, Billy Boyd, Ian McKellen, Dominic Monaghan, Viggo Mortensen, Miranda Otto, John Rhys-Davies, Andy Serkis, Liv Tyler, Karl Urban, and Elijah Wood, plus writer Philippa Boyens and director Peter Jackson.

Astin narrated the 2023 comedy film Go West, the first theatrical film from the original cast of the sketch comedy show Studio C, produced by their own company, JK Studios. Astin made his Broadway debut as Santa Claus in a revival of Elf the Musical, which ran at the Marquis Theatre from November 2024 to January 2025.

== President of SAG-AFTRA ==
In July 2025, Astin declared he would run to succeed Fran Drescher as president of SAG-AFTRA. From August 13 to September 12, 2025, Astin ran against Chuck Slavin for the office.

On September 12, 2025, it was announced that Astin was elected president of SAG-AFTRA for a two-year term, receiving 79.25% of the vote from participating SAG-AFTRA members. Astin's mother, Patty Duke, was elected president of the Screen Actors Guild forty years earlier.

== Personal life ==
Astin married Christine Harrell on July 11, 1992. They have three daughters. His wife held the Miss Indiana Teen USA title in 1984. One daughter, Ali, had a small cameo role in The Lord of the Rings: The Return of the King as Elanor Gamgee, Astin's character's daughter, and appears in Bad Kids of Crestview Academy as Ethel Balducci.

Astin has a tattoo on his ankle of the word "nine" written with the Tengwar script, commemorating his Lord of the Rings involvement and his character's membership in the "Fellowship of the Ring". Seven of the eight other actors (Elijah Wood, Sean Bean, Billy Boyd, Ian McKellen, Dominic Monaghan, Viggo Mortensen, and Orlando Bloom) all have the same tattoo. John Rhys-Davies's stunt double, Brett Beattie, has the tattoo as well.

In an August 2013 interview, Astin said that he is a Lutheran, having been "baptized in my wife's Lutheran church". "I don't know if I'm a very good [Christian] but I'm praying the forgiveness thing is legit," Astin said in an interview.

In January 2015, Astin completed the Dopey Challenge at the Walt Disney World Resort which involves running a 5k, 10k, half-marathon and full marathon on four consecutive days.

On October 10, 2015, Astin competed in the 2015 Ironman World Championship in Kailua Kona, Hawaii. Wearing number 143, Astin finished the race in a time of 15:30:31.

In 2024, Astin completed his master's degree in public administration and policy at American University. American University awarded Astin an honorary Doctor of Humane Letters during the Fall 2024 graduation, at which he was also the keynote speaker.

In March 2025, Astin partnered with Lego to launch a set based on The Shire, featuring a commemorative video of Astin himself building the set.

=== Political support ===
From 1995 to 2005, Astin served as a Civilian Aide to the Secretary of the Army (CASA) and afterwards served on the President's Council on Service and Civic Participation for two years during the George W. Bush administration. He was awarded the honorary Emeritus Civilian Aide designation in 2022.

Astin is a lifelong supporter of the Democratic Party. During the 2004 United States presidential election, Astin backed Senator John Kerry and participated in Kerry's campaign rally in Portland, Oregon, as the opening speaker. In the 2008 presidential election, Astin lent his support to then-Senator Hillary Clinton for the first of her two Presidential campaigns and made multiple campaign appearances on her behalf, including joining Clinton's daughter Chelsea at some stops. Astin served as the campaign manager for Democrat Dan Adler, a businessman friend in the entertainment industry, in California's 36th congressional district special election of 2011. In the 2016 presidential election, Astin campaigned for Hillary Clinton in midwestern states such as Iowa, Nebraska, and Wisconsin. In a 2020 Twitter post, Astin voiced his support for Democratic nominee Joe Biden. On July 29, 2024, Astin appeared in the White Dudes for Harris Zoom call expressing his support for Vice President Kamala Harris' presidential campaign. Astin additionally appeared at the 2024 Democratic National Convention during the nominating roll call vote on August 20, 2024, representing Indiana.

In September 2024, Astin urged California governor Gavin Newsom to sign SB 1047, a bill that would require advanced AI models to undergo safety testing before deployment.

== Filmography ==
=== Film ===
| Year | Title | Role | Notes | Ref. |
|---|---|---|---|---|
| 1985 | The Goonies | Michael "Mikey" Walsh | | |
| 1987 | Like Father Like Son | Clarence / Trigger | | |
| 1987 | White Water Summer | Alan | | |
| 1989 | The War of the Roses | Josh Rose (age 17) | | |
| 1989 | Staying Together | Duncan McDermott | | |
| 1990 | Memphis Belle | Sergeant Richard "Rascal" Moore | | |
| 1991 | Toy Soldiers | William Tepper | | |
| 1991 | The Willies | Michael | | |
| 1992 | Where the Day Takes You | Greg | | |
| 1992 | Encino Man | Dave Morgan | | |
| 1993 | Rudy | Daniel "Rudy" Ruettiger | | |
| 1994 | Teresa's Tattoo | Step Brother | Uncredited | |
| 1994 | Safe Passage | Izzy Singer | | |
| 1994 | Kangaroo Court | —N/a | Director and producer Short film | |
| 1995 | The Low Life | Andrew | | |
| 1996 | Courage Under Fire | Patella | | |
| 1998 | Boy Meets Girl | Mike | | |
| 1998 | Bulworth | Gary | | |
| 1999 | Deterrence | Ralph | | |
| 1999 | Kimberly | Bob | | |
| 2000 | Dish Dogs | Morgan | | |
| 2000 | The Last Producer | Bo Pomerantz | | |
| 2000 | Icebreaker | Matt Foster | | |
| 2000 | The Sky Is Falling | Mr. Schwartz | | |
| 2001 | The Lord of the Rings: The Fellowship of the Ring | Samwise Gamgee | | |
| 2002 | The Lord of the Rings: The Two Towers | Samwise Gamgee | | |
| 2003 | The Lord of the Rings: The Return of the King | Samwise Gamgee | | |
| 2004 | Balto III: Wings of Change | Kodi | Voice; Direct-to-video | |
| 2004 | Elvis Has Left the Building | Aaron | | |
| 2004 | 50 First Dates | Doug Whitmore | | |
| 2005 | Smile | Mike Matthews | | |
| 2005 | Bigger Than the Sky | Ken Zorbell | | |
| 2005 | Marilyn Hotchkiss Ballroom Dancing & Charm School | Kip Kipling | | |
| 2005 | Borderland | Randall | | |
| 2005 | Love & Debate | Coach Amal | Direct-to-video | |
| 2006 | What Love Is | George | Direct-to-video | |
| 2006 | Asterix and the Vikings | Justforkix | Original version, Voice | |
| 2006 | Click | Bill | | |
| 2007 | The Final Season | Kent Stock | | |
| 2007 | My Wife Is Retarded | Jeff | Short film | |
| 2008 | Forever Strong | Marcus | | |
| 2008 | Spirit of the Forest | Furi | Voice | |
| 2009 | Stay Cool | Big Girl | | |
| 2009 | Alvin and the Chipmunks: The Squeakquel | Meerkat Manor Narrator | Voice | |
| 2011 | Demoted | Mike | Direct-to-video | |
| 2012 | Boobathon | Takin Mastuhmik | Fake trailer | |
| 2012 | Dorothy and the Witches of Oz | Frack | | |
| 2012 | Amazing Love: The Story of Hosea | Stuart | Direct-to-video | |
| 2013 | The Freemason | Leon Weed | Direct-to-video | |
| 2014 | Justice League: War | Shazam | Voice; Direct-to-video | |
| 2014 | Boys of Abu Ghraib | Staff Sergeant Tanner | Direct-to-video | |
| 2014 | Cabin Fever: Patient Zero | Porter | Direct-to-video | |
| 2014 | Moms' Night Out | Sean | | |
| 2014 | Video Games: The Movie | Narrator | Documentary | |
| 2014 | Ribbit | Ribbit | Voice | |
| 2014 | The Hero of Color City | Horatio | Voice | |
| 2014 | The Surface | Mitch | Direct-to-video | |
| 2015 | Justice League: Throne of Atlantis | Shazam | Voice; Direct-to-video | |
| 2015 | Do You Believe? | Dr. Farell | | |
| 2015 | Woodlawn | Hank | | |
| 2015 | Checkmate | Dyson | | |
| 2016 | The Do-Over | Ted-O | | |
| 2016 | Range 15 | Grigsby | | |
| 2016 | Unleashed | Carl | | |
| 2017 | Bad Kids of Crestview Academy | Headmaster Nash | | |
| 2017 | Dead Ant | Art | | |
| 2017 | Espionage Tonight | Sam Jacobson | | |
| 2017 | The Lears | Tom Cornwall | | |
| 2018 | Gloria Bell | Jeremy | | |
| 2020 | Adverse | Frankie | | |
| 2020 | Lego DC Shazam! Magic and Monsters | Shazam | Voice; Direct-to-video | |
| 2021 | Hero Mode | Jimmy | | |
| 2021 | Charming the Hearts of Men | George | | |
| 2023 | The AD-X2 Controversy | Himself | Documentary short | |
| 2023 | iMordecai | Marvin | | |
| 2023 | Go West | Narrator | | |
| 2023 | Hard Miles | Speedy | | |
| 2023 | The Shift | Gabriel | | |
| 2023 | Holiday Twist | Whitmer | | |
| 2023 | The Man in the White Van | William | | |
| 2024 | Man and Witch: The Dance of a Thousand Steps | Dog | | |
| 2025 | Love Hurts | Cliff Cussick | | |
| 2025 | Little Lorraine | Father Williams | | |
| 2026 | Chili Finger | Ron Lipki | | |
| 2026 | Matter of Time | Gibbs | | |

=== Television ===
| Year | Title | Role | Notes | Ref. |
|---|---|---|---|---|
| 1981 | Please Don't Hit Me, Mom | Brian Reynolds | Television film | |
| 1982 | The Rules of Marriage | Charlie Hagen | Television film | |
| 1985 | The O'Briens | The Son | Television film | |
| 1986 | The B.R.A.T. Patrol | Leonard Kinsey | Television film | |
| 1995 | Harrison Bergeron | Harrison Bergeron | Television film | |
| 2003 | Angel | —N/a | Director; episode: "Soulless" | |
| 2003–2004 | Jeremiah | Mister Smith | Main role (season 2) | |
| 2004 | Higglytown Heroes | Pix the Elf | Voice; 1 episode | |
| 2004 | Party Wagon | Randall McDuff / Josiah | Voice; television film | |
| 2005 | Hercules | Linus | Miniseries | |
| 2005 | Into The West | Martin Jarrett | Miniseries | |
| 2005 | Slipstream | Stuart Conway | Television film | |
| 2005–2007 | Meerkat Manor | Narrator | Seasons 1–3 | |
| 2006 | 24 | Lynn McGill | Main role (Season 5) | |
| 2007 | Masters of Science Fiction | Charlie Kramer | Episode: "Watchbird" | |
| 2007 | Monk | Paul Buchanan | Episode: "Mr. Monk Is At Your Service" | |
| 2007 | My Name Is Earl | Salesman | Episode: "Get a Real Job" | |
| 2008 | Terry Pratchett's The Colour of Magic | Twoflower | Television film | |
| 2008 | Law & Order | Pastor Hensley | Episode: "Angelgrove" | |
| 2009–2012 | Special Agent Oso | Agent Oso | Voice; Main role (60 episodes) | |
| 2011 | Love's Christmas Journey | Mayor Wayne | Television film | |
| 2012 | NCIS | Tyler Elliot | Episode: "The Tell" | |
| 2012 | Adopting Terror | Tim | Television film | |
| 2012 | Hollywood Treasure | Himself | Episode: "Riddler Rudy and the Ruby Slippers" | |
| 2012 | Franklin & Bash | Viper | Episode: "Viper" | |
| 2012 | Alphas | Mitchell | 2 episodes | |
| 2012–2017 | Teenage Mutant Ninja Turtles | Raphael | Voice | |
| 2013 | Santa Switch | Eddie | Television film | |
| 2014 | Stan Lee's Mighty 7 | Kid Kinergy | Voice; television film | |
| 2014 | The Strain | Jim Kent | Main role (Season 1) | |
| 2015, 2017 | Penn Zero: Part-Time Hero | Blaze | Voice; 4 episodes | |
| 2015 | Sofia the First | Benngee | Voice; 2 episodes | |
| 2016 | The Loud House | Loni | Voice; episode: "One of the Boys" | |
| 2016 | The Librarians | Kirby Goulding | Episode: "And the Tears of a Clown" | |
| 2016–2018 | Justice League Action | Shazam | Voice; 5 episodes | |
| 2016–2018 | Bunnicula | Chester | Voice | |
| 2017–2019 | Stranger Things | Bob Newby | 10 episodes | |
| 2018–2020 | The Epic Tales of Captain Underpants | Narrator | 48 episodes | |
| 2019 | The Big Bang Theory | Dr. Pemberton | 3 episodes | |
| 2019 | No Good Nick | Ed | Main role | |
| 2019 | Brooklyn Nine-Nine | Sergeant Knox | Episode: "Ticking Clocks" | |
| 2019–2020 | Supergirl | Pete Andrews | 2 episodes | |
| 2020 | New Looney Tunes | Himself | Voice; 3 episodes | |
| 2021 | Jungledyret Hugo | Hugo | Voice | |
| 2021 | Playing with Power: The Nintendo Story | Narrator | 5 episodes | |
| 2021 | Scooby-Doo and Guess Who? | Himself | Voice; episode: "Returning of the Key Ring!" | |
| 2022 | Young Rock | Man / Julien | 6 episodes | |
| 2023 | Perry Mason | Sunny Gryce | Season 2 (2 episodes) | |
| 2023 | Kung Fu Panda: The Dragon Knight | Master Sloth | Voice; 2 episodes | |
| 2023–2025 | The Conners | Tyler | 8 episodes | |
| 2024 | Mighty MonsterWheelies | Invisible Van | Voice; episode: "The Art of Deception" | |
| 2024 | A Nonsense Christmas with Sabrina Carpenter | Himself / Santa Claus | Netflix holiday special | |
| 2025 | Haha, You Clowns | Himself | Voice; episode: "Duncan Holds a Baby" | |

=== Stage ===
| Year | Title | Venue | Role |
|---|---|---|---|
| 2024–2025 | Elf | Marquis Theatre, Broadway | Santa Claus / Mr. Greenway |

=== Web series ===
| Year | Title | Role |
|---|---|---|
| 2015 | Con Man | Himself |
| 2020 | Wayward Guide for the Untrained Eye | Lesly Stone |
| 2023 | Third Eye | Frank |

=== Video games ===
| Year | Title | Role | Notes |
|---|---|---|---|
| 2002 | Kingdom Hearts | Hercules | English version |
| 2003 | The Lord of the Rings: The Return of the King | Samwise Gamgee | |
| 2004 | Men of Valor | Pat 'Mouth' Hodges | |
| 2006 | The Lord of the Rings: The Battle for Middle-earth II: The Rise of the Witch-king | Samwise Gamgee | |
| 2010 | The Lord of the Rings: Aragorn's Quest | Samwise Gamgee | |
| 2012 | Lego The Lord of the Rings | Samwise Gamgee | Archive recordings |
| 2013 | Teenage Mutant Ninja Turtles | Raphael | |
| 2015 | Lego Dimensions | Samwise Gamgee | |
| 2016 | Minecraft: Story Mode | Reginald | |
| 2024 | Teenage Mutant Ninja Turtles: Wrath of the Mutants | Raphael | |
| 2025 | Nicktoons & The Dice of Destiny | Raphael | |

== Awards and nominations ==
| Year | Association | Category | Work | Result | Ref. |
|---|---|---|---|---|---|
| 1985 | Young Artist Awards | Best Starring Performance by a Young Actor – Motion Picture | The Goonies | Won | |
| 1989 | Young Artist Awards | Best Young Actor Starring in a Motion Picture | Staying Together | Won | |
| 1991 | Young Artist Awards | Outstanding Young Ensemble Cast in a Motion Picture | Toy Soldiers | Nominated | |
| 1994 | Academy Awards | Best Live Action Short Film | Kangaroo Court | Nominated | |
| 2001 | Screen Actors Guild | Outstanding Performance by a Cast in a Motion Picture | The Lord of the Rings: The Fellowship of the Ring | Nominated | |
| 2002 | MTV Movie Awards | MTV Movie Award for Best On-Screen Team (shared with Elijah Wood and Gollum/Andy Serkis) | The Lord of the Rings: The Two Towers | Won | |
| 2002 | Visual Effects Society | Best Performance by an Actor in an Effects Film (shared with Elijah Wood and Andy Serkis) | The Lord of the Rings: The Two Towers | Won | |
| 2002 | Screen Actors Guild | Outstanding Performance by a Cast in a Motion Picture | The Lord of the Rings: The Two Towers | Nominated | |
| 2003 | Chicago Film Critics Association | Best Supporting Actor | The Lord of the Rings: The Return of the King | Nominated | |
| 2003 | National Board of Review | Best Cast | The Lord of the Rings: The Return of the King | Won | |
| 2003 | Saturn Awards | Best Supporting Actor | The Lord of the Rings: The Return of the King | Won | |
| 2003 | Screen Actors Guild | Outstanding Performance by a Cast in a Motion Picture | The Lord of the Rings: The Return of the King | Won | |
| 2003 | Visual Effects Society | Outstanding Male or Female Actor | The Lord of the Rings: The Return of the King | Won | |
| 2003 | Washington D.C. Area Film Critics Association | Best Ensemble | The Lord of the Rings: The Return of the King | Nominated | |
| 2014 | Utah Film Awards | Best Actor | The Freemason | Won | |
| 2017 | Screen Actors Guild | Outstanding Performance by an Ensemble in a Drama Series | Stranger Things | Nominated | |
