= Slouching Toward Bethlehem (Angel) =

- Angel episode
- Episode no.: Season 4 Episode 4
- Directed by: Skip Schoolnik
- Written by: Jeffrey Bell
- Production code: 4ADH04
- Original air date: October 27, 2002

Guest appearances
- Andy Hallett as Lorne; Stephanie Romanov as Lilah Morgan; David Grant Wright as Minivan Dad; Carol Avery as Minivan Mom; Steven Mayhew as Minivan Teen; Nynno Ahli as Carlo; Thomas Crawford as Eater Demon

Episode chronology
← Previous "The House Always Wins"	Next → "Supersymmetry"
- Angel season 4

"Slouching Toward Bethlehem" is the fourth episode of the fourth season of the American television series Angel. Its title derives from a line from the W. B. Yeats poem "The Second Coming".

== Plot synopsis ==
A man tries to get his stalled car started while his family waits in the car. Connor appears by the car and warns them of danger just before a tow truck arrives with a vampire driving it. The vampire attacks, but Connor intervenes and kills it. Connor breaks into the hotel through a window just in time to see Angel and friends arrive home and spot Cordelia in the lobby. They try to approach her, but she doesn't remember anything about them or herself. Angel tries to remind Cordelia about who she is, but she is scared and doesn't know what to believe.

Lorne approaches the hotel from outside, but Angel sends Gunn to intercept him before Cordelia can see him and be frightened. Angel panics with Fred in the office about how they're going to handle Cordelia's lack of memory while Cordy panics herself in the lobby because of everyone's strange behavior. The phone rings and they let the machine get it until the message reveals more than Cordelia needs to hear and Fred quickly picks it up. Without saying much, she then runs off to get Gunn and prevent a demon from bearing its spawn. Angel takes Cordelia upstairs to one of the rooms where all of her stuff has been stored from her apartment. Cordy looks through some of the boxes as Angel again tries to convince her that she's safe and with friends.

After changing into more comfortable clothes, Cordelia nervously practices saying her name in front of a mirror and then reads the eerie messages left in her high school yearbook and searches through pictures of herself from over the years. Cordelia wanders through the halls of the hotel and follows the sound of singing to Lorne's room where he's listening to a client sing. She doesn't see much and heads downstairs to the lobby. Angel removes several jars of blood from the counter before she can see them, but she finds a drop of blood left behind and starts to worry. Gunn and Fred return covered in purple demon goo and talking about killing the demon babies, unaware that Cordelia is hiding behind the counter. She pops up and runs out into the garden only to be jumped by a couple of evil lawyers. She fights them off with Angel's help and then vocalizes her suspicions that she's a spy and they want something from her. Angel denies that and tries to calm her down without revealing the truth to her.

Back in her room, Cordelia asks about a picture of her, she wonders if she was a nun, handing him a handful of crucifixes she found in her boxes. Angel vamps out at the burning contact and Cordelia again runs away and into Lorne down in the lobby. She's fed up and wants to know the truth, but when the gang finally tells her everything, she has a hard time believing it. Cordelia sings rather badly so Lorne can read her future but the singing sends Lorne running off to his room without much of an explanation. Angel follows after in search of answers and frustrated, Cordelia takes off on her own, despite Gunn and Fred's attempts to stay with her.

Angel desperately tries to get answers from Lorne about his reading of Cordelia, but Lorne is tightlipped. He does reveal that something horrible and evil is coming and it seriously freaked him out. Lilah lies in bed with Wesley and talk about Angel before Wesley conversationally mentions that they're in a "relationship" and has to pay Lilah a dollar because he lost a bet. Cordelia searches for Angel in the hotel, but instead finds Lorne's client—a large mouthed human-eating demon—in one of the halls. She runs from it and is rescued by Connor, who stabs the demon and then takes a willing Cordelia with him to somewhere safer.

Angel, Gunn and Fred look at the dead human-eating demon while Lorne updates them on the horrific things he saw when reading Cordelia. Angel and the others set out to find Cordelia. At some sort of a warehouse, Connor and Cordelia talk and bond as Connor leads her to the place he calls home. He's brutally honest with her about everything and Cordelia appreciates his candor. While sleeping at Wesley's, Lilah gets a call on her cell phone about Cordelia's return and rushes off, leaving an eavesdropping Wesley alone.

Cordelia tries to sleep, but she can't with so many pieces missing from her puzzle. Connor tries to comfort her and remind her of the few things he knew about her. She recognizes his loneliness that somewhat matches her own. As Angel updates the others on his failure to locate Cordelia, Wesley arrives with some answers. He reveals that Cordelia's with Connor but that Wolfram and Hart are planning to go after her again for the knowledge she may have about the Powers. Connor sleeps next to Cordelia with his hand inappropriately placed on her chest but moves it to quiet her as someone breaks into the room. More men attack and Cordelia and Connor are forced to fight them off as best as they can. Lilah watches the proceedings from the roof on a video feed as the gang arrive and help fight off the Wolfram and Hart minions.

After the bad guys are defeated, Angel tries to get Cordelia to return with him, but she chooses to stay with Connor because Connor was truthful with her. Although her choice hurts them, Angel and the others leave. Wesley finds the dollar bill Lilah left behind on the floor of his bedroom and realizes something. Back at the hotel, they hear a noise in the office that distracts them. They find Lorne tied up in the office, a bad wound on his forehead. He reveals that Wolfram and Hart used a special burrowing demon to sneak into his head and steal the knowledge Lorne had about Cordelia. It was all a trap to get Lorne alone and vulnerable.

Wesley shows up at Lilah's door and gets upset with her because she tricked him into luring Angel away from Lorne. She reminds him it was just part of her job and that she spared Lorne's life because he was Wesley's friend. Cordelia sleeps while Connor watches over her, while at the hotel, Angel stares out into the night and longingly back at his empty bed.
