= Marita Grabiak =

American television director

- Born: Ambridge, Pennsylvania, U.S.
- Occupation: Television director
- Years active: 1986–present

Marita Jane Grabiak is an American television director. She began her career as a production assistant on the film The Men's Club (1986) along with fellow Joss Whedon collaborator Tim Minear. She has directed episodes of several television series including Dawson's Creek, Dollhouse, ER, Firefly, Buffy the Vampire Slayer, Angel, Smallville, Cold Case, Gilmore Girls, Everwood, Battlestar Galactica, Lost, The Inside, Alias, Law & Order: Special Victims Unit, Point Pleasant, One Tree Hill, American Horror Story, V Wars, 9-1-1: Lone Star, 9-1-1, Siren and The Order.

She is a graduate of UCLA.
