= Steven S. DeKnight =

American screenwriter

- DeKnight in 2026
- Born: October 28, 1965 (age 60); Millville, New Jersey, U.S.
- Occupations: Screenwriter; television producer; director
- Spouse: Jaime Slater

Steven S. DeKnight (born October 28, 1965) is an American filmmaker and comic book writer. He is best known for being the creator, head writer, and executive producer of the Starz series Spartacus, including Spartacus: Blood and Sand, Spartacus: Gods of the Arena, Spartacus: Vengeance, and Spartacus: War of the Damned, as well as developing the first season of Marvel's Daredevil and Jupiter's Legacy for Netflix.

== Career ==
DeKnight previously worked on Smallville, Buffy the Vampire Slayer, and Angel. He also wrote "Swell", a story in the Buffy the Vampire Slayer Season Eight comic series, and served as a consulting producer on Joss Whedon's television series Dollhouse.

In May 2014, DeKnight was reported to be taking over showrunning duties for the first season on the Netflix television series Daredevil from Drew Goddard, after Goddard's departure due to scheduling conflicts with directing Sinister Six. He was later replaced by Doug Petrie and Marco Ramirez to serve as co-showrunners for the second season of the series.

In 2015, DeKnight joined the Transformers Cinematic Universe franchise's writers room, where Paramount Pictures hired multiple noted screenwriters to flesh out the future of the film series. He directed the science fiction sequel Pacific Rim Uprising. The original film's director, Guillermo del Toro, remained on the film in the role of producer.

On July 17, 2018, it was announced that DeKnight would be credited as a show-runner and executive producer alongside Lorenzo di Bonaventura and Dan McDermott in the Netflix superhero series, Jupiter's Legacy. On September 16, 2019, it was confirmed that DeKnight departed the series as a showrunner over creative differences in the midst of the production for the first season.

On April 15, 2019, DeKnight joined a host of other writers in firing their agents as part of the WGA's stand against the ATA and the practice of packaging.

In November 2023, Starz greenlit the 10-episode series Spartacus: House of Ashur with DeKnight returning to the franchise to serve as showrunner and executive producer. In May 2026, Starz canceled the series after one season.

== Filmography ==
=== Film ===
Year	Title	Director	Writer
2018	Pacific Rim Uprising	Yes	Yes

=== Television ===
Year	Title	Director	Writer	Producer	Creator	Showrunner	Notes
2000–2002	Buffy the Vampire Slayer	No	Yes	No	No	No	Writer (5 episodes), Story editor (season 6)
2002–2004	Angel	Yes	Yes	Yes	No	No	Director (3 episodes), Writer (12 episodes), Producer and supervising producer (season 5)
2004–2007	Smallville	Yes	Yes	No	No	No	Director (2 episodes), Writer (15 episodes)
2007	Viva Laughlin	No	Yes	Executive	No	No	Writer
2009	Dollhouse	Yes	Yes	Consulting	No	No	Episode "The Target"
2010–2013	Spartacus	No	Yes	Executive	Yes	Yes	Writer (10 episodes)
2015	Daredevil	Yes	Yes	Yes	No	Yes	Director (1 episode), Writer (3 episodes)
2021	Jupiter's Legacy	Yes	Yes	Executive	Yes	Yes	Director (2 episodes), Writer (2 episodes)
2025–2026	Spartacus: House of Ashur	No	Yes	Executive	Yes	Yes	Writer (3 episodes)
