= Buffy the Vampire Slayer season 3 =

1998-1999 season of Buffy the Vampire Slayer

Buffy the Vampire Slayer
- Season 3
- Region 1 Season 3 DVD cover
- Showrunner: Joss Whedon
- Starring: Sarah Michelle Gellar; Nicholas Brendon; Alyson Hannigan; Charisma Carpenter; David Boreanaz; Seth Green; Anthony Stewart Head
- No. of episodes: 22

Release
- Original network: The WB
- Original release: September 29, 1998 – September 21, 1999

Season chronology
- ← Previous; Season 2 Next → Season 4

The third season of the television series Buffy the Vampire Slayer premiered on September 29, 1998 on The WB and episode 22, the second of the two part season finale, aired on July 13, 1999. However, episode 18 "Earshot" did not air until September 21, 1999, shortly before the season 4 premiere. The show maintained its previous time slot, airing Tuesdays at 8:00 pm ET. "Earshot" and "Graduation Day, Part Two", were delayed in the wake of the Columbine High School massacre because of their content.

== Plot ==
After attempting to start a new life in Los Angeles, Buffy Summers (Sarah Michelle Gellar) returns to Sunnydale in season three, and is reunited with her friends and her mother. She is no longer a criminal suspect, but Principal Snyder, who took vindictive pleasure in expelling Buffy, refuses to reinstate her until he is told to do so by Giles. Angel (David Boreanaz) is resurrected mysteriously by the unseen Powers That Be. While Buffy is happy to have Angel back, he seems to have lost much of his sanity in Hell. Buffy helps Angel recover but, having seen Angel's demonic side, Buffy's friends distrust him until he saves them from a monster.

Rupert Giles (Anthony Stewart Head) is fired from the Watchers' Council because he has developed a "father's love" for Buffy, and towards the end of the season Buffy announces that she will also no longer work for the Council. Early in the season she is confronted with an unstable Slayer, Faith (Eliza Dushku), who was activated after Kendra's death near the end of season two.

Angel, after getting his soul back, is once again tormented by his guilt and personally by an entity called the First Evil, who takes credits of bringing Angel back for wicked intents and goads him into attempting suicide. Though Buffy is unable to prevent Angel from killing himself, the Powers That Be intervene and convince Angel that he has a greater purpose.

Although the First is still out there, the antagonist of the season is shown to be the affable Mayor Richard Wilkins III (Harry Groener), who is near completion of his plan to "ascend" to become a giant snake-like demon – having already gained immortality through a Faustian bargain with demons when he founded Sunnydale a century ago. The final step is to be a massacre of students on Sunnydale High's graduation day.

Although Faith works with Buffy at first, after accidentally killing a human, Faith becomes irrational and sides with Mayor Wilkins, whose charismatic behavior influences Faith's dark side. She helps Mayor Wilkins in his plan, and eventually she poisons Angel. The only antidote for the poison is the blood of a Slayer, so Buffy tries to grab Faith to feed her to Angel. Faith, though severely wounded, jumps from her roof onto a passing truck, out of Buffy's reach. Buffy is forced to let Angel drink from her, putting her in a brief coma. Mayor Wilkins, who had a fatherly affection for Faith, gets angry and attempts to suffocate her, but is stopped by Angel. During her time in a coma, Buffy shares a dream with Faith where they make peace.

At the climax of the season, Mayor Wilkins speaks at the graduation ceremony and ascension, as the time for his transformation has come and he finally morphs into the demon Olvikan. He eats Principal Snyder and kills several others and students; but Buffy and her friends have organized the graduating students to fight back against Mayor Wilkins and his vampires. (A solar eclipse allows Angel and other vampires to be out in daytime.) Buffy confronts the demon, taunting him about Faith. She lures the provoked Mayor into the library which has many explosives. The explosion destroys Wilkins in his Olvikan form, as well as the school.

Meanwhile, Angel becomes convinced that Buffy's love for him will be bad for her in the long run. After the battle with the Mayor, he leaves Sunnydale, leading to the spin-off series in Los Angeles. Cordelia also leaves Sunnydale at the end of the season in order to attempt an acting career in L.A., though later becomes a major character on the spin-off.

== Cast and characters ==
=== Main cast ===
- Sarah Michelle Gellar as Buffy Summers
- Nicholas Brendon as Xander Harris
- Alyson Hannigan as Willow Rosenberg
- Charisma Carpenter as Cordelia Chase
- David Boreanaz as Angel
- Seth Green as Daniel "Oz" Osbourne
- Anthony Stewart Head as Rupert Giles

=== Recurring cast ===
- Kristine Sutherland as Joyce Summers
- Eliza Dushku as Faith
- Harry Groener as Mayor Richard Wilkins III
- Alexis Denisof as Wesley Wyndam-Pryce
- Armin Shimerman as Principal Snyder
- Danny Strong as Jonathan Levinson
- Larry Bagby as Larry Blaisdell
- K. Todd Freeman as Mr. Trick
- Jason Hall as Devon MacLeish
- Emma Caulfield as Anya Jenkins
- Ethan Erickson as Percy West
- Jack Plotnick as Deputy Mayor Allan Finch
- Fab Filippo as Scott Hope
- Mercedes McNab as Harmony Kendall
- Saverio Guerra as Willy the Snitch

=== Guest cast ===
- Elizabeth Anne Allen as Amy Madison
- Robia LaMorte as The First Evil/Jenny Calendar
- Julia Lee as Lily/Anne Steele
- James Marsters as Spike
- Mark Metcalf as The Master
- Robin Sachs as Ethan Rayne
- Andy Umberger as D'Hoffryn
- Harris Yulin as Quentin Travers
- Serena Scott Thomas as Gwendolyn Post

== Crew ==
Series creator Joss Whedon served as executive producer and showrunner, and wrote and directed five episodes of the season including the season premiere and the two-part finale. David Greenwalt was promoted to executive producer, and wrote two episodes (including directing one of them) and directed another. Marti Noxon was promoted to co-producer and wrote five episodes. New additions in the third season included Jane Espenson, who served as executive story editor and wrote three episodes, including an episode originally pitched from Thania St. John (who receives story credit). Douglas Petrie joined as a story editor, later promoted to executive story editor midseason and wrote three episodes. Dan Vebber joined as a staff writer and wrote two episodes. David Fury returned and freelanced two episodes. This was the last season for Greenwalt as a writer/director on the series, as he departed to be the showrunner for the spin off series Angel. He would serve as consulting producer until the end of the sixth season.

Joss Whedon directed the highest number of episodes in the third season, directing five episodes. James A. Contner and James Whitmore, Jr. each directed four.

== Episodes ==
No. overall	No. in season	Title	Directed by	Written by	Original release date	Prod. code	U.S. viewers (millions)
35	1	"Anne"	Joss Whedon	Joss Whedon	September 29, 1998	3ABB01	7.06
Willow, Oz, Xander, and Cordelia attempt to cover Buffy's Slayer responsibilities, with mixed results. Grieving over Angel, Buffy has exiled herself to Los Angeles, working at a diner, Helen's Kitchen, under the name "Anne". Buffy meets Lily, a member of a former group who romanticized vampires and were saved by Buffy. After Lily's boyfriend Rickie goes missing, Buffy reluctantly agrees to help. Buffy saves an old man who walks into traffic, but he dies soon after. Buffy realizes that he is Rickie, decades older than the previous day. Lily meets the owner of a homeless shelter, who convinces her that Rickie is there. Buffy discovers that a blood bank has been providing names of homeless people to the shelter, and goes to investigate, only to be thrown, along with Lily, through a portal into a demonic factory where the missing people are slaves. When they are no longer useful, they are returned to their own world, where only a single day has passed, as time passes faster in the factory. Announcing herself as the Slayer, Buffy leads an uprising against the demons. The portal closes behind the freed slaves. Buffy allows Lily to assume her identity as "Anne", and returns to Sunnydale.
36	2	"Dead Man's Party"	James Whitmore, Jr.	Marti Noxon	October 6, 1998	3ABB02	6.20
Buffy has been cleared of Kendra's murder, but Principal Snyder refuses to allow her to return to Sunnydale High. Joyce and Buffy's friends find it difficult to welcome Buffy back to Sunnydale. Joyce brings home a Nigerian mask called Ovu Mobani (which means Evil Eye), which she hangs in her bedroom, and invites Buffy's friends over for a dinner party to celebrate her return. Buffy's friends, wishing to avoid talking to Buffy about their feelings of abandonment, invite Oz's band. Meanwhile, a dead cat and several dead people return to life. Investigating, Giles discovers that Joyce's mask carries the spirit of a demon. Racing to warn Buffy, Giles witnesses an army of the dead heading for the Summers house. Buffy overhears her mother admitting it is difficult to deal with Buffy's return. Feeling betrayed, Buffy makes plans to leave again. Joyce and Buffy's friends confront Buffy over her abandonment. The zombies arrive and attempt to claim the mask, but Buffy destroys Ovu Mobani and the zombies vanish. Giles threatens Snyder to allow Buffy to return to school. Buffy reconciles with Willow, who tells Buffy she has begun to study witchcraft.
37	3	"Faith, Hope & Trick"	James A. Contner	David Greenwalt	October 13, 1998	3ABB03	5.46
Two vampires, Mr. Trick and Kakistos, arrive in Sunnydale. Buffy is readmitted to school by a reluctant Snyder. At the Bronze, Buffy sees a young woman leaving with a vampire. Fearing for her life, she follows them, but watches the woman kill the vampire, introducing herself as the Slayer Faith. Faith's arrival causes tension, as she appears more enthusiastic about her role than Buffy, and flirts with Scott Hope, Buffy's potential love interest. Scott asks Buffy on a date. She initially accepts, but is startled after he gives her a ring similar to one Angel gave her. Giles tells Buffy that Faith's Watcher is dead. Buffy goes to warn Faith, but she already knows, having come to Sunnydale to escape from Kakistos. Kakistos leads an attack on the pair. Mr. Trick leaves the fight halfway through, while Faith and Buffy kill Kakistos. In the library later, Buffy reveals to Willow and Giles that Angel's soul was restored just before she had to kill him. Faith stays in Sunnydale. Buffy agrees to go on a date with Scott. She abandons a ring in the mansion where Angel had died. Moments after she leaves, Angel reappears.
38	4	"Beauty and the Beasts"	James Whitmore, Jr.	Marti Noxon	October 20, 1998	3ABB04	6.20
Giles reveals that a student was mauled to death overnight. Oz is a prime suspect, as a window to Oz's cage was open. Willow collects a hair sample from the victim, hoping to determine who killed him, but the test is inconclusive. That night, Buffy is attacked by a rabid Angel. She subdues him and chains him up. Buffy visits the school counselor, but finds him dead. Pete loses his temper with girlfriend Debbie over a bottle with a green liquid inside. He transforms into a monster and attacks Debbie, but relents, blaming her for angering him. Oz notes that all victims are connected to Debbie. Now suspecting Pete, Buffy and Willow approach her, but Debbie, who has been physically and psychologically abused, blames herself for Pete's anger. Pete visits Oz, transforms into a monster, and attacks. Oz is overpowered until he turns into a werewolf, turning the tables. Debbie stops Buffy from stunning Pete, who escapes. Later, Pete kills Debbie and overpowers Buffy. On the verge of killing her, Angel, who has broken free, intervenes and saves her, and reveals that he remembers her. Buffy keeps Angel's return a secret.
39	5	"Homecoming"	David Greenwalt	David Greenwalt	November 3, 1998	3ABB05	6.53
Buffy nurses Angel back to health in secret. Scott breaks up with Buffy, telling her that she seems too distracted. Buffy, angry that Cordelia did not tell her about yearbook photographs, decides to compete with Cordelia for the title of Homecoming Queen. Preparing for the dance, Willow and Xander flirt with each other and share a kiss, despite their ongoing relationships. Spies, working for Mr. Trick, overhear Buffy saying that she and Faith will ride together in a limo to the Homecoming dance. Mr. Trick sends several vampires to kill the two Slayers. In an attempt to restore their friendship, Willow arranges for Cordelia to take Faith's place in the limo. The driver takes them to a clearing with a TV, which plays a recording of Mr. Trick announcing the SlayerFest '98 hunt. Buffy and Cordelia trap one vampire, then retreat to a cabin for shelter. They manage to contact Giles and escape. At the library, Cordelia kills one vampire and scares off another. Buffy tricks two other assailants into shooting each other dead. Mr. Trick visits the Mayor, who recruits him to help control the town's youth.
40	6	"Band Candy"	Michael Lange	Jane Espenson	November 10, 1998	3ABB06	6.35
Buffy struggles to manage her time between her friends, Giles, Joyce, and Angel, eventually caught by Joyce and Giles in a lie about her evening. Snyder tasks Buffy with selling chocolate bars to raise money for the band. The chocolate proves extremely addictive, and causes the adults to act increasingly immaturely. Buffy and Willow find The Bronze packed with adults partying. Buffy, realizing that the chocolate is responsible, decides to visit the factory. On her way there, she finds Giles and Joyce kissing in the street. Buffy breaks into the factory, finding it empty apart from Ethan, who eventually reveals that he is working for Mr. Trick and a demon called Lurconis. Giles remembers that Lurconis hides in the sewers. They arrive in time to stop Mr. Trick, the Mayor, and several vampires from completing the ritual to summon Lurconis and feed him a tribute of four babies, although the Mayor escapes before being noticed. Mr. Trick also escapes, and Buffy sets Lurconis on fire. The adults soon return to normal. The Mayor reprimands Mr. Trick for allowing the demon to die.
41	7	"Revelations"	James A. Contner	Douglas Petrie	November 17, 1998	3ABB07	6.46
Gwendolyn Post arrives, claiming to be Faith's new watcher. She warns that a demon named Lagos is seeking the Glove of Myhnegon, a powerful gauntlet. While searching for the Glove of Myhnegon, Xander sees Angel and Buffy together. Angel shows Buffy the Glove of Myhnegon. Xander rushes to tell Giles of Angel's return, finding him with Gwendolyn. Giles and the others confront Buffy later, with Giles angry that Buffy concealed Angel's return. Gwendolyn visits Faith, promising to be a strict watcher and disparaging Giles's methods. Xander tells Faith that Angel is alive and has the Glove of Myhnegon and Faith decides to slay Angel. Giles tells Gwendolyn that he knows how to destroy the glove, but Gwendolyn knocks him out. Xander and Faith find Giles hurt. Faith assumes that Angel was responsible, and rushes to kill him. Gwendolyn and Faith arrive separately first. Faith defeats Angel, but Buffy stops her from killing him. Faith and Buffy fight. Gwendolyn recovers the glove and puts it on, using it to summon lightning bolt and attack the others. Buffy manages to kill Gwendolyn after Faith acts as a distraction. The group reconcile and forgive Angel, but Faith feels unable to trust anyone after Gwendolyn's betrayal.
42	8	"Lovers Walk"	David Semel	Dan Vebber	November 24, 1998	3ABB08	6.00
Buffy receives her SAT scores and ponders a future outside Sunnydale. Willow goes to a magic shop, looking for ingredients for an anti-love spell to end her and Xander's mutual attraction. Spike, who has returned to Sunnydale, kidnaps Willow and Xander and forces Willow to cast a love spell on Drusilla, who has left him. Spike visits Buffy's home and talks to Joyce. Buffy and Angel intervene and attack him, but he refuses to tell them where Willow is. They agree to cooperate with him while he seeks supplies for the spell. Fearing they are about to die, Xander and Willow kiss just as Oz and Cordelia find them. Horrified, Cordelia runs off but is impaled on rebar when some stairs collapse under her. Several vampires attack Spike, Angel, and Buffy, but they eventually repel their attackers. Spike decides to win Drusilla back without using a spell, and leaves. Xander visits Cordelia, who is recovering in hospital, but she tells him to stay away from her. Buffy tells Angel that she cannot continue seeing him unless Angel says he does not love her, which he cannot bring himself to do.
43	9	"The Wish"	David Greenwalt	Marti Noxon	December 8, 1998	3ABB09	6.32
Willow attempts to repair things with Oz, but he tells her to leave him alone. Cordelia, heartbroken over Xander, meets Anya, who tries to help her move on. Anya gives Cordelia a necklace. After Cordelia says that she wishes Buffy had never come to Sunnydale, Anya turns into a demon, then vanishes, and Cordelia is transported to an alternative reality. Soon after, Cordelia learns that Sunnydale is overrun by vampires, as The Master has taken over Sunnydale. Cordelia tries to tell Giles, but Willow and Xander, now vampires, kill her. Giles recovers her necklace, and deduces that it belongs to Anyanka and that reality can be restored if Anyanka's power center is destroyed. Buffy, who was based in Cleveland, arrives after Giles attempts to contact her. Buffy goes to the Bronze, finding Angel chained up. She agrees to let him help her, and they go to a factory where The Master has automated blood extraction. In the ensuing fight, Angel, Willow, Xander, and Buffy are killed. Giles summons Anyanka, and destroys her amulet, returning reality to the moment that Cordelia expressed her wish. Anya is perplexed at being unable to grant wishes.
44	10	"Amends"	Joss Whedon	Joss Whedon	December 15, 1998	3ABB10	6.85
Oz and Willow make amends and get back together, although Oz decides to take things slowly. Buffy, at Joyce's request, invites Faith over for Christmas, but she refuses. Angel visits Giles, asking for help about vivid dreams of his past crimes. Angel sees a vision of Jenny Calendar, and runs out, panicked. Soon after, Buffy tells Giles that she was in Angel's dream, and they begin to investigate. Angel's dreams intensify, and tell him that his pain will end if he kills Buffy. Giles suggests that the First Evil is the cause of Angel's visions. Faith visits Buffy's home after all, but Angel arrives and warns Buffy to stay away from him, leaving before he loses control. Buffy tracks down The First Evil, who tells Buffy that she cannot defeat it, and that Angel will be dead by sunrise. Buffy finds Angel, who refuses to leave the hilltop, having chosen to kill himself. However, a snowfall arrives, protecting Sunnydale from the sun, saving Angel's life. Angel and Buffy walk through the town hand-in-hand.
45	11	"Gingerbread"	James Whitmore, Jr.	Story by : Thania St. John & Jane Espenson; Teleplay by : Jane Espenson	January 12, 1999	3ABB11	6.42
Joyce joins Buffy on a night of Slaying and finds two dead children. Giles theorizes that the children were victims of an occult sacrifice. Joyce speaks out in front of the whole town against monsters, witches, and Slayers. Willow and Amy Madison, who have started a coven, soon become suspects after police search their lockers and find material related to witchcraft. Joyce forbids Buffy from seeing Willow again, and suggests that Buffy has not helped Sunnydale despite her Slaying. After Buffy leaves, the two children appear to Joyce in a vision. Realizing that the children have no parents or identity, Buffy and her friends find records of the same children dying every 50 years since 1649. Buffy and Giles rush to tell Joyce, but Joyce knocks them out on the children's instructions. Willow, Buffy, and Amy are tied to stakes at the city hall. Cordelia revives Giles while Joyce starts a fire at Buffy's feet. Amy escapes by transforming into a rat, while Cordelia and Giles arrive in time to douse the fire. Giles performs a spell that reveals the demon behind the children, and Buffy kills it. Buffy and Willow attempt, but fail, to restore Amy's human form.
46	12	"Helpless"	James A. Contner	David Fury	January 19, 1999	3ABB12	7.00
Buffy loses her Slayer strength during a fight with a vampire and is nearly killed. During a training session, Giles hypnotizes and drugs Buffy. Meanwhile, the head watcher, Quentin Travers, prepares a test for Buffy's 18th birthday, including a captive drug-addicted vampire, Kralik. Kralik escapes, turning one of Quentin's assistants, Blair, into a vampire and killing the other. Out at night, Buffy runs into Kralik and Blair. Without her powers, she is forced to run, but Giles rescues her. Giles confesses that he drugged her on the instructions of the Watchers' Council. Buffy leaves with Cordelia, furious at Giles. She returns home to find a message from Kralik, who has kidnapped Joyce. Buffy goes to find Joyce, managing to trap Blair and knock him unconscious, and evades Kralik. Buffy steals Kralik's pills and finds Joyce, but Kralik catches up to her. He swallows the pills, but dies after drinking from a glass that Buffy filled with holy water. Quentin congratulates Buffy on passing the test, but fires Giles from the Council for assisting her. Buffy allows Giles to tend her wounds, and the pair await a new watcher.
47	13	"The Zeppo"	James Whitmore, Jr.	Dan Vebber	January 26, 1999	3ABB13	5.93
Buffy, Faith, Willow, and Giles work together to defeat several demons that Giles later identifies as members of the Sisterhood of Jhe, who are intent on opening the Hellmouth. Xander, feeling increasingly insecure about his role in the group, borrows his uncle Rory's car hoping it will make him useful, but accidentally rear-ends school bully Jack. Jack threatens Xander with a knife, but Xander covers for Jack when police arrive, gaining his respect. Jack takes Xander to the cemetery, where they resurrect Jack's dead friends. Jack, also dead, tries to initiate Xander into the group, but he flees. Driving away, Xander hits a member of the Sisterhood, saving Faith. They retreat to her motel, where Faith seduces him. After having sex, Faith kicks Xander out. Xander realizes that Jack and his friends have built a bomb. With Buffy, Giles, and the rest of his friends too busy, Xander tracks down the group himself. After outwitting them, Xander forces Jack to defuse the bomb, before Oz kills Jack. Meanwhile, Buffy, Faith, Angel, Willow, and Giles manage to close the Hellmouth and stop the Sisterhood in a largely off-screen struggle.
48	14	"Bad Girls"	Michael Lange	Douglas Petrie	February 9, 1999	3ABB14	6.09
Buffy and Faith's new Watcher, Wesley Wyndam-Pryce, tasks Buffy with finding an amulet belonging to the demon Balthazar. Joined by Faith, they defeat the vampires named El Eliminati and recover the amulet despite being outnumbered. Faith interrupts a class test to take Buffy to another vampire nest, and after a successful hunt the two go out dancing together. Angel warns Buffy and Wesley that Balthazar has returned. Buffy gives Angel the amulet for safekeeping. Buffy and Faith track down Balthazar, and break into a nearby shop to arm themselves. They are arrested, but break out of the police car, injuring the officers in the process. The following night, Faith and Buffy attack several more vampires, but Faith mistakes Deputy Mayor Allan for a vampire and kills him. Other vampires kidnap Wesley and Giles. Balthazar interrogates them. Wesley is willing to give up the amulet, but does not know Angel's name. Angel himself shows up, along with Buffy. They free Giles and Wesley and defeat the vampires and Balthazar. Balthazar warns Buffy that a greater enemy is rising. Later, the Mayor performs a ritual to make himself invincible. Buffy visits Faith, who acts unconcerned about Allan's death.
49	15	"Consequences"	Michael Gershman	Marti Noxon	February 16, 1999	3ABB15	5.93
Divers recover Allan's body in the river, where Faith had dumped it. Wesley asks Buffy and Faith to investigate his murder. Buffy confesses to Willow, who advises her to seek Giles. Faith, however, has already told Giles that Buffy killed Allan. Giles orders Buffy into his office, but tells Buffy that he knows Faith has lied. Wesley overhears their conversation and contacts the Watchers' Council. Xander offers to help, revealing that he has slept with Faith, upsetting Willow. Xander visits Faith, but she overpowers and starts to strangle him. Angel rescues Xander and chains Faith up, warning Buffy that Faith may have developed a taste for killing. Watchers led by Wesley arrive, subduing Angel and taking Faith away for judgment. Faith escapes, however. Buffy tracks down Faith, but fails to talk her down, and Buffy hits Faith in anger. They are interrupted by vampires led by Mr. Trick. Faith fights them off, and kills Mr. Trick before he can kill Buffy. Buffy expresses a hope to Giles that Faith may yet be redeemed, but Faith visits the Mayor and offers to replace Mr. Trick.
50	16	"Doppelgangland"	Joss Whedon	Joss Whedon	February 23, 1999	3ABB16	6.50
Willow continues to investigate the Mayor. Faith alerts him of the attempt, and the Mayor tells Faith that he plans to have Willow killed. Anya, desperate to regain her powers as a vengeance demon, asks Willow to help summon her amulet. The spell goes wrong, calling Willow's vampire form to Sunnydale. At the Bronze, Xander and Buffy run into Vampire Willow, and are horrified when she reveals her vampire face. Other vampires attack Vampire Willow, but she easily overpowers and recruits them. The real Willow arrives, much to her friends' relief and puzzlement. Oz and Angel watch Vampire Willow lead an attack on the Bronze. Anya offers to help Vampire Willow return to her world. Buffy leads an attempt to retake the Bronze, leaving Willow behind. Vampire Willow attacks real Willow, but Willow shoots her vampire form with a tranquilizer gun. Buffy decides to use real Willow as a decoy to persuade the vampires to leave the Bronze. Cordelia unwittingly frees Vampire Willow, but Wesley saves Cordelia. Anya eventually sees through the subterfuge, and Buffy and Angel fight the vampires. Working with Anya, they return Vampire Willow to her reality, where she is immediately killed.
51	17	"Enemies"	David Grossman	Douglas Petrie	March 16, 1999	3ABB17	5.94
Buffy and Faith encounter a demon, claiming to have Books of Ascension for the Mayor and offering to sell them. Faith tracks the demon down on the Mayor's orders and kills it, recovering the Books. She visits Angel, confessing to a murder and acting distressed. Faith tries to seduce Angel, but he rebuffs her. Faith and the Mayor plot to remove Angel's soul, with help from a demon. Faith returns to Angel along with the demon, and they perform a spell in an attempt to remove his soul. The spell appears successful, and after a struggle, Angel and Faith visit the Mayor. Wesley leads Cordelia and others to the Hall of Records, to research on the Mayor. They learn that the Mayor has been alive for almost a century. Angel joins Faith to find Buffy. After bringing her to Angel's mansion, they restrain her. Faith taunts Buffy, moaning about being in her shadow and revealing details about the Mayor's plans for Ascension, and that the Mayor deliberately built Sunnydale on the Hellmouth. Angel reveals that his turn was in fact a sham. Faith escapes. Shaken by their joint deception, Buffy tells Angel that she needs a break from being together for a little while.
52	18	"Earshot"	Regis Kimble	Jane Espenson	September 21, 1999	3ABB18	5.08
Buffy get infected with blood from a slain demon and soon gains the power to hear people's thoughts, with the exception of Angel's. Initially she finds the new ability useful, exploiting it to gain an advantage in class. However, her friends are uncomfortable at Buffy hearing their innermost thoughts, and the voices soon become overwhelming. Buffy overhears one student making a threat against the school before collapsing in the cafeteria. Giles takes Buffy home, while Willow organizes an investigation into the threat. Angel kills a second of the same demon, using its heart with a potion to try and cure Buffy. Willow and Oz track down a suspect, but it turns out that he has no involvement. Cordelia finds a letter from Jonathan, a boy struggling with confidence issues. Buffy tracks him to the clock tower, where he has assembled a rifle and had planned to kill himself. Buffy talks him down. Xander stumbles upon a lunch lady spiking the food with rat poison, and Buffy knocks her unconscious. Jonathan attends counseling and is suspended from school. This episode was originally scheduled to be broadcast on April 27 but was postponed following the Columbine High School massacre on April 20, 1999.
53	19	"Choices"	James A. Contner	David Fury	May 4, 1999	3ABB19	5.04
Buffy asks Wesley to leave Sunnydale after graduation, but Wesley forbids it. Buffy offers to act proactively to stop the Mayor's plans for Ascension. Faith steals the Box of Gavrok at the docks and delivers it to the Mayor. Buffy learns of this, and plans with the others to steal and destroy the Box, over Wesley's objections. The heist is successful, although Faith kidnaps Willow. Buffy and Wesley argue over whether to trade the Box for Willow, Oz settling the matter by smashing a vessel containing the potion needed for the ritual. Willow briefly escapes, levitating a pencil to stake a vampire, and finds the Books of Ascension in the Mayor's office. She steals a few pages before being recaptured. The Mayor arrives at the school to make the exchange, which is interrupted when Snyder arrives with security guards. One of the guards opens the box, and two large beetle-like creatures come out of it, killing the guard. Buffy closes the box before any more can escape. The Mayor leaves with the box. Buffy realizes that she cannot leave Sunnydale as long as evil exists there. Willow agrees to stay to help her and to continue her witchcraft studies.
54	20	"The Prom"	David Solomon	Marti Noxon	May 11, 1999	3ABB20	5.22
Joyce visits Angel, telling him that he cannot stand in the way of Buffy's future. On patrol together, Angel breaks up with Buffy and says that he plans to leave Sunnydale after the Ascension. Xander runs into Cordelia at a clothes shop. They get into an argument, during which Cordelia reveals that her family is poor now. A monster breaks into the shop and kills a boy wearing a tuxedo. Wesley identifies the beast as a hellhound, and deduce that a malcontent student, Tucker Wells, plans to use the hellhound to ruin prom night. Buffy offers to stop Tucker so that the rest can enjoy the prom. Xander attends the prom with Anya. Cordelia thanks Xander for paying for her dress, then dances with Wesley. Buffy easily subdues Tucker, but learns that he already released three hellhounds. Buffy manages to kill all three before they interrupt the prom, then changes into her own dress. Buffy is surprised to win the prom award of Class Protector, awarded as thanks from the whole school for her work stopping monsters. Angel arrives in a tuxedo, to dance with Buffy, although he stresses that it does not change things between them.
55	21	"Graduation Day (Part 1)"	Joss Whedon	Joss Whedon	May 18, 1999	3ABB21	5.13
Faith kills Professor Worth on the Mayor's orders, causing Buffy and Giles to investigate. Anya reveals that she has previously seen an Ascension, explaining that the resulting demon will be much stronger than anything the group has faced. The Mayor interrupts the meeting, threatening the group. Giles stabs him, but the Mayor is unharmed. Buffy convinces Joyce to leave town for her own safety. Willow searches desperately for a spell to stop the Ascension, but finds nothing. Oz calms her down with a kiss, and they make love. Angel and Buffy raid Worth's office, finding some notes which they take to Wesley and Giles, who discover that Worth had found the bones of the demon Olvikan. Faith shoots Angel with an arrow laced with a toxin deadly to vampires, leaving Angel near death. The Watchers' Council refuses to help Angel, leading Buffy to quit the Council. Willow learns that a cure requiring the blood of a Slayer exists. The Mayor eats some insects from the Box of Gavrok, part of his preparation for the Ascension. Buffy finds Faith at her apartment and the two fight. Buffy stabs Faith, but she jumps off into a passing truck.
56	22	"Graduation Day (Part 2)"	Joss Whedon	Joss Whedon	July 13, 1999	3ABB22	6.53
Buffy visits Angel and forces him to drink her blood, allowing Angel to recover. When he comes to he takes Buffy, now near death herself, to hospital. Nearby, the Mayor is informed that Faith is alive but in a coma from which she may never recover. The Mayor tries to suffocate Buffy, but Angel stops him. Buffy has a dream in which Faith tells her that even the Mayor has human weaknesses. Buffy wakes up, recovered, and organizes a plan with her friends for stopping the Mayor. Xander and Willow recruit several school students to join their plan. The graduation ceremony begins, and during his speech the Mayor's Ascension begins, and he transforms into Olvikan. The students reveal that they are all armed, and begin an attack. Olvikan kills Snyder and several other students. Buffy taunts Olvikan about Faith, drawing him away from the remaining students towards the library, where Giles detonates a bomb, destroying the demon and the school. In the aftermath, Wesley returns to England, and Angel leaves without saying goodbye to Buffy, although they share a final look at each other from a distance. This episode sees the last appearance of Cordelia Chase, who would go on to be a series regular in the Angel spin-off series.

== Reception ==
The season is frequently regarded as the best season of the series. On Rotten Tomatoes, 100% of 13 critic reviews are positive for the season and the average rating is 8.8/10. The website's critics consensus reads, "Season three perfects the show's winning formula to create an addictive and satisfying viewing experience, episode after episode." It received two Primetime Emmy Award nominations: Outstanding Makeup for a Series for "The Zeppo" and Outstanding Sound Editing for a Series for "Lovers Walk".

The season averaged 5.3 million viewers, which was its highest rated season.

== Home media ==
Buffy the Vampire Slayer: The Complete Third Season was released on DVD in region 1 on January 7, 2003 and in region 2 on October 29, 2001. The DVD includes all 22 episodes on 6 discs presented in full frame 1.33:1 aspect ratio. Special features on the DVD include four commentary tracks—"Helpless" by writer David Fury, "Bad Girls" by writer Doug Petrie, "Consequences" by director Michael Gershman and "Earshot" by writer Jane Espenson. Writers Joss Whedon, Jane Espenson, and Doug Petrie discuss the episodes "Bad Girls", "Consequences", "Enemies", "Earshot", and "Graduation Day, Part One" in interviews. Scripts for "Faith, Hope & Trick", "Band Candy", "Lovers Walk", and "The Wish" are included. Featurettes include, "Special Effects", "Wardrobe", "Weapons", which all detail the title subjects; "Buffy Speak", which details the language and dialogue used on the show; and "Season 3 Overview", a 20-minute featurette where cast and crew members discuss the season. Also included are cast biographies and photo galleries.
