= Earshot (Buffy the Vampire Slayer) =

- Buffy the Vampire Slayer episode
- Episode no.: Season 3 Episode 18
- Directed by: Regis Kimble
- Written by: Jane Espenson
- Production code: 3ABB18
- Original air date: September 21, 1999

Guest appearances
- Kristine Sutherland as Joyce Summers; Alexis Denisof as Wesley Wyndam-Pryce; Ethan Erickson as Percy West; Danny Strong as Jonathan Levinson; Larry Bagby III as Larry Blaisdell; Keram Malicki-Sánchez as Freddy Iverson; Justin Doran as Hogan Martin; Lauren Roman as Nancy Doyle; Wendy Worthington as Lunch Lady; Robert Arce as Mr. Beach; Molly Bryant as Ms. Murray; Rich Muller as Student; Jay Michael Ferguson as Another Student

Episode chronology
| ← Previous "Enemies" | Next → "Choices" |
- Buffy the Vampire Slayer season 3

"Earshot" is the eighteenth episode of the third season of the television show Buffy the Vampire Slayer. It was written by Jane Espenson, directed by Regis Kimble, and first broadcast, out of sequence, on September 21, 1999 on The WB. The originally scheduled broadcast was postponed following the Columbine High School massacre on April 20, 1999. Buffy goes slowly mad with a case of telepathy, while the Scooby Gang must solve the mystery of who might kill the students of Sunnydale High.

== Plot ==
On patrol, Buffy runs into two mouthless demons and succeeds in killing one, but some of its blood is absorbed through her skin. When her hand starts itching, Giles explains that she may be infected with an aspect of the demon. Buffy worries about what physical attribute she might be getting and is horrified when Willow wonders if the demon was male.

The next day, as she is walking through the halls, Buffy finds that she can hear the thoughts of others. In class, she answers the teacher's questions about Othello by listening to the thoughts of her classmates. She also hears the thoughts of Freddy Iverson, who writes editorials for the school newspaper and who has a negative opinion about everything at Sunnydale.

Later that day, Buffy goes to the mansion to use her mind-reading abilities to check up on Angel and find out the truth about what happened between him and Faith. He informs her that she can no more read his mind than see his image in a mirror. He tells her that what happened with Faith meant nothing and that in 243 years, he has loved only Buffy.

At the library, Buffy tells her friends about her ability to read minds. She learns that Xander constantly thinks about sex, Cordelia says almost exactly what she thinks, Oz thinks extremely deep thoughts, Willow thinks about how she is left out of things, and Wesley thinks about Cordelia romantically but reprimands himself for having amorous feelings for a student.

In the lunchroom, Buffy hears that someone is planning to kill all the students. She tells everyone to get organized and find out who the potential killer is. Buffy goes home to rest while Willow and the others go around interviewing students and faculty.

Angel hunts down the surviving demon and brings its heart in a glass mixed with other ingredients, after Buffy finds the effects of mind-reading to be stressful and distracting. He forces Buffy to drink it and she goes into convulsions. When she wakes up, she is no longer able to hear thoughts.

Willow and the rest of the Scooby Gang locate all the students on the list except Freddy Iverson, so they all go looking for him. They finally corner Freddy in his office and learn that he is not the potential killer. They find a letter from Jonathan apologizing for his upcoming actions. The gang finds Jonathan in the clock tower, assembling a rifle. Buffy takes it from him, and then discovers that he was planning to kill only himself. Xander checks the kitchen and stumbles upon a lunch lady putting rat poison into the food. She tries to kill him with a cleaver, but Buffy knocks her unconscious.

Giles and Buffy recap what happened as they walk in the school grounds. Buffy tells Giles that she now knows he had sex with her mother; Giles walks into a tree.

== Production ==
In her commentary on the DVD, writer Jane Espenson reveals that when she found out that she was going to write this episode she knew that she wanted the student in the tower to be Jonathan. Even though Danny Strong had only had small, comedic parts on the series over the years, she had faith that he would be able to handle the dramatic scene. Espenson also mentions in her commentary that she included the exchange in which Buffy discovers that her mother slept with Giles in "Band Candy" because she was surprised that fans were not sure that they had had sex and she wanted to eliminate any doubts. James South wrote that Oz's thoughts, overheard by Buffy, "I am my thoughts... if they exist in her, Buffy contains everything that is me, and she becomes me. I cease to exist" is a reference to the philosopher Descartes.

Giles walking right into a tree after Buffy told him she knew he slept with her mother was Anthony Head's idea, although he did not expect that Joss Whedon would actually let him do it.

== Cultural references ==
The website Women at Warp compares the episode with the Star Trek: The Next Generation episode "Tin Man." "Tam is a lifelong Betazoid telepath, while Buffy suddenly gains the ability after coming in contact with a demon. While Buffy's telepathy isn't permanent, it causes her to react the same as Tam, isolating herself to escape the pain caused by constant chatter in her head. Ultimately, Buffy recovers, but not before using her telepathy to prevent a classmate's suicide. Tam, meanwhile, chooses suicide by joining with the Tin Man lifeform. Bonus points: While he doesn't appear in "Earshot," Harry Groener, who plays Tam, also played the Mayor of Sunnydale in this season of Buffy."

== Broadcast ==
The Columbine High School massacre occurred one week before the episode was originally scheduled to air. Because it included a scene with a student loading a rifle – apparently for mass murder, but in reality for suicide – the WB substituted a rerun of "Bad Girls". The episode was delayed until September 1999, two weeks prior to the season four premiere. The season finale was also delayed due to "school violence concerns".

== Reception ==
Vox ranks it at #36 on their "Every Episode Ranked From Worst to Best" list, praising the "rather heartbreaking conversation between her and Jonathan about the fundamental loneliness and pain of human existence... despite its heavy subject matter and rather clumsy misdirection around the true nature of the threat, for most of its runtime 'Earshot' remains on the lighter side of things."

Rolling Stone similarly ranks it at #44 and writes of the face-off between Buffy and Jonathan, "It's incredibly powerful and comes out of nowhere, hitting you like a freight train."

Billie Doux, giving the episode 4 out of 4 stakes, writes, "We had the biting wit and great lines, and yet they were addressing truly serious issues here. ... I really enjoyed the scene where she was smugly reading her teacher's mind." She also praises the continuing subplot of Larry Blaisdell's coming out as a gay man.

Noel Murray of The A.V. Club criticized the portrayal of telepathy in the episode, and generally on TV and film, but praised the humorous and poignant insights it gave into what Buffy's friends were thinking. A review for the BBC praised the concept of Buffy the mind reader, but was less impressed by the plot's more routine group investigation.
