= Homecoming (Buffy the Vampire Slayer) =

- Buffy the Vampire Slayer episode
- Episode no.: Season 3 Episode 5
- Directed by: David Greenwalt
- Written by: David Greenwalt
- Production code: 3ABB05
- Original air date: November 3, 1998

Guest appearances
- K. Todd Freeman as Mr. Trick; Jeremy Ratchford as Lyle Gorch; Fab Filippo as Scott Hope; Ian Abercrombie as German Boss; Harry Groener as Mayor Richard Wilkins; Eliza Dushku as Faith Lehane; Danny Strong as Jonathan Levinson; Jack Plotnick as Deputy Mayor Allan Finch; Jason Hall as Devon MacLeish; Joseph Daube as Hans Gruenstahler; Jermyn Daube as Frederick Gruenstahler; Lee Everett as Candy Gorch; Tori McPetrie as Michelle Blake; Chad Stahelski as Kulak

Episode chronology
← Previous "Beauty and the Beasts"	Next → "Band Candy"
- Buffy the Vampire Slayer season 3

"Homecoming" is the fifth episode of the third season of the television series Buffy the Vampire Slayer. It was written and directed by David Greenwalt, and first broadcast on The WB on November 3, 1998.

== Premise ==
Old enemies have returned to kill the Slayers and when Cordelia is mistaken for Faith, she has to help Buffy fight for their lives.

== Plot ==
Scott Hope breaks up with Buffy the day after asking her to the Homecoming Dance. Buffy continues to feed a weak Angel in secret, telling him the others would not understand that he is now better, and no longer the evil Angelus.

At school, Buffy is monitored by two men in a van who are somehow connected with Mr. Trick. They overhear Buffy mention that a limo will pick up both her and Faith to take them to the Homecoming Dance. The gang sends Cordelia to remind Buffy that yearbook photos are about to take place, but Cordelia is too busy campaigning for Homecoming Queen. After discovering that her favorite teacher does not remember her, and that it was Cordelia's fault that she missed yearbook photos, Buffy decides to compete for the Homecoming Queen title.

Meanwhile, Trick introduces a competition, "SlayerFest '98", with a group of participants including German twin assassins Hans and Fredrick Gruenstahler, "The Most Dangerous Game" hunter Frawley, Kulak, a demon of the Miquot Clan, and Lyle Gorch and his new wife Candy. When Xander and Willow try on their homecoming outfits, tension builds until they finally kiss.

On Homecoming night, Buffy is collected by a limo containing Cordelia instead of Faith. Cordelia gives Buffy a note from the rest of the gang, who hope that Buffy and Cordelia will make up. Upon exiting the limo, the girls find themselves isolated in a remote location. They find a videotape message, addressed to Buffy and Faith, detailing the hunting of the slayers in SlayerFest '98. The participants attack and after Buffy defeats Frawley, the girls seek shelter in a cabin.

Buffy and Cordelia find a phone and attempt to alert Giles to their situation, but the phone is soon cut dead. They begin to bond when Cordelia admits that she loves Xander and Buffy reveals that she spent a year's allowance on her dress. Kulak arrives and fights with Buffy until the German assassins fire a grenade into the cabin. Buffy and Cordelia escape back to the library, while Kulak is killed in the explosion.

Upon arriving at the library, Buffy and Cordelia find Giles has been knocked unconscious by Lyle and Candy. Buffy manages to stake Candy, but is knocked out in the process. Cordelia scares off Lyle by persuading him that she is a bigger threat than Buffy. When Buffy and Giles wake up, they discover the tracking devices in the corsages. Buffy distracts the German assassins as they enter the school, managing to plant the trackers on them and have them annihilate each other with their high-tech equipment. Trick is escorted to the Mayor's office, who recruits him to help control the rebellious youth of Sunnydale. Buffy and Cordelia finally arrive at the homecoming dance to find that neither of them won the title.

== Themes ==
"Homecoming" was criticized by Bryan Senn for concentrating too much on Buffy's self-pity, which prompts her to campaign to be Homecoming Queen. It leaves little time for the hunting-humans-as-sport storyline, a twist on the theme of Richard Connell's 1924 short story "The Most Dangerous Game" and its 1932 film adaptation of the same name.

At the site InsectReflection.com, essayist Emily (last name not given) writes, "Since this series started, Cordelia Chase has existed for one specific purpose – to act as Buffy’s Shadow Self. She has represented Buffy’s pre-Slayer self, and her desire to return to that state. ... This is Cordelia’s last hurrah – the last episode in which she fully acts as Buffy’s Shadow before Faith takes on the role full-time. This is half the reason why Cordelia is mistaken for Faith by the competitors in Slayerfest ‘98 and hunted alongside Buffy."

== Cultural references ==
Cordelia tries to win the nerd vote for Homecoming Queen by saying, "Are you kidding? I've been doing the Vulcan death grip since I was 4," a reference to Star Trek.

Oz tells Buffy, "As Willow goes, so goes my nation." This refers to the political adage "As Maine goes, so goes the nation," meaning that Maine voters acted as a bellwether for presidential elections. General Motors also took the phrase for their ad campaign "As General Motors goes, so goes the nation."

In this episode, Buffy deliberately, if indirectly, kills "ordinary" human beings for the first time, when she manipulates the Gruenstahler brothers into shooting each other.

== Continuity ==
=== Arc significance ===
Vox writes, "Homecoming introduces Xander and Willow's inevitable, ill-advised romantic dalliance, which reverberates throughout the season. It also, by dint of neither Buffy nor Cordelia winning the crown, underlines that Cordelia — a key player in Buffy as well as, eventually, Angel — is just as much a misfit as the rest of the Scooby gang, try as she might to deny it."

Myles McNutt writes that "we saw in 'Becoming' that Xander loves Willow as a friend enough that it could some day evolve into something more, so my issue is more the speed than the very fact of the matter. However... It’s a great way for the show to prepare us for the fact that their connection isn't 'going away,' and to use a device which has much larger functions for the purpose of ongoing character development is just some really smart long-form storytelling.

Mayor Richard Wilkins, Season 3's Big Bad, first appears. His assistant, Allan Finch, will be killed by Faith in episode "Bad Girls."

== Reception ==
Vox ranked it at #43 on their "Every Episode Ranked From Worst to Best" list.

Mark Oshiro writes, "This show would not be as interesting if everyone had the most perfect quip available, or if they navigated the social strata of Sunnydale high with perfection. ... First of all, the competition between Buffy and Cordy inadvertently causes something else: Xander and Willow." Moreover, "Other characters in the show see [Cordelia] as vapid and shallow. It's hard to deny that she does care about superficial things, but she does so in a way that’s just so fearless."

Noel Murray of The A.V. Club praises "the glorious sight of Cordelia whapping the bad guys with a spatula and using her powers of intimidation to help herself and Buffy get out of a bad scrape. (Buffy holds her own too, especially when she uses misdirection to get two German slayer-hunters to kill each other, all while a flyer about "problem solving" hangs on a wall behind her.)" Justin Carreiro of TVFanatic.com writes that the episode "paired our favorites queens in a thrilling battle that showed every reason why Cordelia and Buffy needed more scenes together." He adds, "Cordelia's best moment was her speech in the library to [Lyle Gorch] ... Cordelia had the power within her; she only needed to use it to make it count."

Myles McNutt observes, "Ultimately, the episode needs them to be rivals so that there can be conflict when they're trapped in the wonder that is Slayerfest '98, but David Greenwalt does a nice job of drawing from each character's strengths and insecurities to explain their feud. Cordelia is still enough of a strong-minded character that she would forget those friendships when Buffy threatens to challenge her reign at Sunnydale, and Buffy’s just insecure enough that she would run against her in an effort to win out. That their feud would put Buffy and Cordelia into danger – as a change of plans with the limo has Cordelia, rather than Faith, trapped in Mr. Trick’s entrepreneurial endeavour – is the icing on the cake, and the episode has a lot of fun with that story."
