= Mayor (Buffy the Vampire Slayer) =

The Mayor
- Buffy the Vampire Slayer character
- First appearance: "Homecoming" (1998)
- Last appearance: "Touched" (2003); Buffy the Vampire Slayer Season Twelve: Finale (2018)
- Created by: Joss Whedon, David Greenwalt
- Portrayed by: Harry Groener

In-universe information
- Classification: Mayor of Sunnydale
- Notable powers: Sorcery, immortality; superhuman attributes in demon form

Richard Wilkins III (commonly referred to as The Mayor) is a fictional character in the fantasy television series Buffy the Vampire Slayer (1997–2003). Portrayed by Harry Groener, he is the mayor of Sunnydale, a fictional town rife with vampires and demons in which the main character, Buffy Summers (Sarah Michelle Gellar) lives. The premise of the series is that Buffy is a Slayer, a young girl endowed with superhuman powers to fight evil, which she accomplishes with the help of a small group of friends and family, called the Scooby Gang. During the show's second season, it becomes apparent that local authorities are aware of the endemic evil in the town, and either ignore it or are complicit in making it worse. The third season reveals that the Mayor is behind this conspiracy to hide and worsen Sunnydale's supernatural phenomena, as part of his century-long plot to take over the world, making him the season's primary villain, or Big Bad. His genial demeanor, promotion of family values, casual phobia of germs, and dislike of swearing belie his evil nature. The series regularly employs monsters and elements of horror to symbolize real problems, and the abuse of power in relation to the forces of darkness is a repeated theme throughout the series, as well as in its spin-off Angel.

This season also marks Buffy's and her friends' last year in high school, and introduces a long-running character named Faith (Eliza Dushku), who is also a Slayer. After many months of fighting alongside Buffy and being under the authority of Buffy's Watcher, Giles, Faith becomes estranged from Buffy and aligns herself with the Mayor, who both employs her as an assassin and becomes a father figure to her while preparing to become a powerful demon that will destroy the town.

== Creation and casting ==
In planning for the third season, series creator Joss Whedon and the team of writers for the show sought to explore the issues of the abuse of power, and the choices people in or with power make. Veteran stage actor Harry Groener was cast in the role of the Mayor of Sunnydale, the embodiment of a quintessential American politician. In the second season, it becomes clear that the authorities at Sunnydale High School — under which a portal to hell called a Hellmouth is situated — are aware of the perpetual influence of evil at the school and have been reporting events to the Mayor's office. While there are scenes in season 2 which indicate that the Mayor is a fear-inspiring figure, he is not seen until the third season.

Series writer Jane Espenson credited Groener's performance and his chemistry with co-star Eliza Dushku with propelling his character to greater importance and making their relationship a central focus of the season. The writers created the blue collar Slayer Faith (Eliza Dushku) as an anti-Buffy: a young woman given extraordinary physical powers with no moral foundation. Whereas Buffy has had a stable family life up until her parents' divorce two years earlier, Faith does not know her father, and it is revealed that her mother was an alcoholic who beat Faith, before her death. She has been surviving on her own since her original Watcher, someone who teaches her about the demons and monsters she will face, was tortured and killed shortly before Faith's arrival in Sunnydale.

Groener loved the part and was impressed with the writing. As a stage actor used to having rehearsal time to prepare for a role, he found himself often with little time for rehearsal in the environment of television production; actors sometimes get their lines the night before and must memorize them, then spend time on set learning how to block shots for cameras. Consequently, Groener said he did not have much time to rehearse and prepare for the role of the Mayor. He was surprised to see how involved Joss Whedon was in preparing scripts: sometimes Whedon would rewrite lines on set. Groener said, "Poor Joss. Here is a man who I think never sleeps. He never, ever sleeps and of course he was writing and directing the last two episodes, and there were times when we would simply get a synopsis the night before...and while they're setting everything up and getting everything ready to shoot the next scene, Joss is over in a corner writing the scene that's going to happen after that. It can be kind of nuts! But it all gets done. That's the magic of it."

== Establishment ==
Wilkins is first alluded to in the second season's third episode, "School Hard", in a conversation between Principal Snyder and Police Chief Monroe, who agree to cover up the vampire attack which took place during the episode, and report the incident to the mayor. Similar conversations occurred between the two characters on a couple more instances throughout the season, most notably in episode 19, "I Only Have Eyes For You". The Mayor's backstory is revealed throughout Season 3. Richard Wilkins III is also Richard Wilkins I and II; and he has been in office for over a century, pretending to be his own descendants in order to disguise his immortality, and maintaining his long life and political power by paying tribute to an array of demons who live in or under Sunnydale. He has been aware of Buffy's presence in the town from the very beginning and has kept tabs on her through Sunnydale High School's Principal Snyder (Armin Shimerman). Buffy and the rest of the town—except for a small group of his aides—are unaware of the Mayor's dark nature.

The script for the third season's fifth episode "Homecoming", where audiences are first introduced to the mayor, describes him as a man who "couldn't be more unassuming ... one feels that this man has not raised his voice in years, and although he is mild enough in demeanor, one hopes he won't." In the previous episode, Faith arrives in Sunnydale, as does a vampire named Mr. Trick (K. Todd Freeman), who tries to kill both Faith and Buffy. When this is unsuccessful, he attempts to kill both Slayers again—for fun—in "Homecoming", billing it as "Slayerfest" and charging a fee to those who have come to hunt the two. Impressed with his initiative, the Mayor invites Mr. Trick to work for him. Mr. Trick's first assignment is to distract the entire town so four infants can be taken from the hospital to serve as a sacrifice to a demon in "Band Candy". Buffy and the Scooby Gang thwart the Mayor's plans; their successful interference signals to the Mayor that Buffy's efficiency as a fighter of evil will have long-ranging consequences for him. He tells Mr. Trick to keep an eye on her.

The Mayor carries out his evil schemes while exhibiting a paradoxical "fifties sitcom-dad demeanor". He dislikes swearing and disallows its use in his presence. He asserts that he is a family man; a specifically conservative politician who espouses family values. Inside his office cabinet he keeps a variety of skulls, shrunken heads, weapons, and other evil objects alongside a box of hand wipes, which he uses frequently in between dispensing "goofily prudish advice" tainted with dark threats. His phobia of germs was an homage to Buffy producer David Greenwalt, who exhibits similar positive enthusiasm while often wiping his hands with wet towelettes. Groener's acting was praised by author Nikki Stafford, who writes that he "is consistently wonderful in this role, one that would have been very difficult for many actors to maintain". Likewise, Jane Espenson remarked that Groener played the part exhibiting a "wonderful innocent glee" towards evil that she thought was "delightful". Groener stated that when he tried to play the Mayor too dark or evil, Joss Whedon or other directors would ask him to tone it down, take it easy and make the part "real nice". In contrast to the series' previous villains and monsters, the Mayor's evil hides behind a mask of humanity. Groener enjoyed this, saying "You don't have to be Snidely Whiplash to be evil. Look at Ted Bundy." The Mayor's unassuming appearance, pleasure in such harmless activities as miniature golf and reading The Family Circus, and his quirky mysophobia are a part of the season's exploration of moral ambiguity.

== Conflict with Buffy and relationship with Faith ==
During the episodes which reveal the Mayor's true nature, Faith's darker nature also begins to appear. She shows herself to be purely motivated by pleasure, even enjoying to excess her fighting as a Slayer, but unreliable regarding the duties associated with that role. Her character tests ethics more than any other on the series, highlighting the repeated theme of the role of free will in the struggle between good and evil. Her reaction to killing demons and vampires is "positively joyful" contrasting with Buffy's frequent admissions that she considers her responsibilities an imposition on her life—although she is committed to her duty. In the early part of the season, Faith's actions aid the cause of good, but her motivations are ambiguous. She never reveals, other than the pleasure she receives, why she fights evil.

Faith, Buffy, and the Mayor come into conflict during "Bad Girls", an episode in which Buffy allows herself to break rules and ignore responsibility. Needing to distract the Slayers so that he can be assured of the privacy required to complete an important ritual, the Mayor ensures they learn of a cult of vampires loyal to a demon named Balthazar, knowing they will be fully engaged in defeating him, giving the Mayor time to enact a ritual required as part of his preparation to become a demon (referred to as his Ascension). Its outcome is his invulnerability for the next 100 days, illustrated when he allows one of Balthazar's minions to slice his head in two so it can mend itself.

In their efforts to track and defeat Balthazar and his cohorts, Buffy and Faith flirt with lawlessness, breaking into a store and stealing weapons, then escaping police custody to complete their mission. The Deputy Mayor, who has begun to show a reluctance to participate in the Mayor's plans and is keeping track of the Slayers, follows them to warn them of Mr. Trick and the Mayor's intention to have them killed. In the heat of fighting, Faith accidentally stakes and kills the Deputy Mayor, believing him to be a vampire. While Buffy feels terrible guilt for being a part of the Deputy Mayor's death, Faith claims not to, and resents Buffy for continuing to speak of it in "Consequences". Faith tells Buffy's Watcher Giles (Anthony Head) that it was Buffy who killed the Deputy Mayor; he does not believe her and she is taken into custody to be dealt with by the Watchers' Council. She escapes and tries to leave town, only to be stopped by Buffy. Mr. Trick appears on the scene to try to kill them both, and Faith saves Buffy by killing Mr. Trick. She then goes to the Mayor's office and offers him her services, but continues to pretend to be fighting on Buffy's side. Eventually her alliance with the Mayor is exposed and she is revealed as Buffy's enemy.

The Mayor puts Faith up in a large, fully furnished apartment, buys her clothes, a video game system, and an expensive knife. He nurtures her, giving her a sense of belonging after her rift with the Scoobies, asking only in return she kill people when required. Faith has no problem with this arrangement and enjoys the lifestyle. Buffy writer Marti Noxon states that villains who seek out love and social connections to counter their loneliness are complex and interesting to write. The Mayor shows absolute confidence in Faith's abilities and she in turn is validated by him. Among the characters who know them both, the Mayor is the only one who never compares Faith to Buffy. When Faith calls him her "sugar daddy", he gently scolds her, reminding her that he is a "family man". According to author Lorna Jowett, his rejection of any sexual element in their relationship makes their bond stronger. Faith's experience with sex has left her apathetic about her partners, but when the Mayor demands loyalty, she is able to give it. His affection for Faith is genuine; like Faith, he has no living family, his wife having died of old age. The Mayor, according to Harry Groener, is a lonely father figure who "loves unconditionally". In series writer Doug Petrie's opinion, the Mayor is well-matched to Faith, who Petrie sees as "the loneliest person in Sunnydale" who "desperately needs a father". Eliza Dushku states that one of Faith's major life battles is constructing a viable self-esteem, which the Mayor never challenges, but his evil amplifies the "crazy" aspect of her nature. Whedon declared Faith the writing team's first "really human monster". The Mayor intends Faith to inherit his evil empire, and shows unabashed pride in her achievements. Their tenderness with each other, according to Whedon, is a "beautiful counterpoint" to the violence and evil they wreak on the town.

== Demise ==
The Mayor plans his Ascension to demon form to coincide with Sunnydale High School's graduation day. In "Choices", the Mayor must complete another ritual involving a box full of grotesquely large insects which will, after he ingests them, imbue him with greater power. Faith retrieves the box for him, which Buffy then steals in order to prevent this important ritual from occurring. In the process, Buffy's best friend Willow Rosenberg (Alyson Hannigan) is captured by Faith, and the Mayor meets Buffy for the first time when they exchange Willow for the box. During the confrontation, the Mayor pointedly asks questions about the viability of Buffy's relationship with Angel (David Boreanaz), a vampire who has been re-ensouled and who fights alongside Buffy. Although Buffy and Angel have been trying to avoid acknowledging the difficulties involved with continuing a relationship that can make neither of them happy, the Mayor's fatherly questions about their future and his comparison to his own experience of watching his wife Edna Mae die at an old age while he remained youthful, become a factor which forces them to admit that the relationship should end.

Buffy and Angel mutually but sadly concede they cannot be happy together in the next episode but they continue to work toward the goal of defeating the Mayor's plan. The two-part season finale "Graduation Day" reveals that the Mayor will be the keynote speaker at Sunnydale High's commencement ceremony, where he will be able to feed on the students after his transformation. On orders from the Mayor, Faith murders a geologist who has uncovered evidence of a previously ascended demon, then shoots Angel with a poisoned arrow to distract Buffy and the Scoobies, who have to care for, and try to save, Angel. When they learn that the only antidote to the poison is the blood of a Slayer, Buffy tries to capture Faith in order to use her blood to cure Angel. During the fight to do so, Buffy stabs Faith with the knife given to her by the Mayor; Faith escapes, but her injuries put her into the hospital, comatose. Buffy then offers her own blood to Angel, who feeds on her, then takes her to the hospital after he recovers. There, the Mayor is poignantly grieving for Faith. He discovers Buffy in the next room and tries to smother her, but is stopped by Angel.

In a redemptive turn, Faith comes to Buffy in a dream to tell her how to defeat the Mayor, saying "Want to know the deal? Human weakness. It never goes away. Even his." The knife the Mayor gave to Faith then flashes in the palm of Buffy's hand. A fully recovered Buffy and the Scoobies enlist the graduating students of Sunnydale High, outfitting them with weapons to attack immediately after the Mayor's transformation, after learning his invulnerability will end once he is in demon form. The Mayor gives a speech about changes, growing up and moving on, mirroring the loose ends created by the series and the season. A solar eclipse occurs during his speech, signaling the start of the Ascension. He transforms into an enormous snake-like demon, and devours the universally loathed Principal Snyder when the latter admonished him for disrupting the event. While Angel and the Scoobies fight the Mayor's force of vampires, Buffy taunts the now-transformed Mayor with Faith's knife and runs into the school. The Mayor follows her to the library, which is rigged with explosives, killing him and destroying the school with a series of explosions.

== Influence ==
Author Lorna Jowett considers the Mayor a classic villain, similar to the first season's vampire Master. Although the Mayor's appearance is not as frightening as the Master's, both are heads of hierarchies and symbols of patriarchy whose names are their titles. Buffy studies scholar Rhonda Wilcox calls the Mayor — particularly after his transformation — "Mr. Patriarchal Phallus of 1999". Faith's relationship to the Mayor in many ways mirrors Buffy's relationship to her Watcher, Giles, who is Buffy's father figure. Doug Petrie characterizes Faith as "Buffy's evil twin", who gets to do what Buffy would like to do, but cannot because Buffy is moral and not as "free-spirited" as Faith, according to Whedon. Through the Mayor's effort to nurture his relationship with Faith she becomes his subordinate, despite her assertions to Buffy that she is independent. Her motivation to kill the geologist is never more complicated than, "The boss wants you dead", which she tells him just before stabbing him to death. Unlike Giles' mentoring of Buffy, in which he encourages her to make her own decisions despite what she is ordered to do by the similarly patriarchal Watcher's Council, Faith complies with everything the Mayor wants, creating "unquestioning service of the power structure for the sake of approval, comfort, and support of the father". In contrast, Buffy soon stops taking orders from the Watchers' Council. Jowett writes, "The Mayor is ultimately a 'bad' father because he holds the status quo: like the Master before him, he is a powerful patriarch who wants to maintain his position at the top, and the children of such parents will never be able to grow up."

Faith does not die from her injuries, but returns in the fourth season in "This Year's Girl". While still in her coma, she dreams of a pleasant picnic with the Mayor, who picks up a small snake that has slithered onto the blanket and tells it that it does not belong there. The dream-picnic is interrupted by Buffy who stabs him to death. Faith awakens in the hospital to discover that the Mayor has in fact died and left her a video and a device that will allow her to switch bodies with Buffy. After Buffy recovers her own body, Faith goes to Angel in Los Angeles, turns herself in to the police and goes to prison, later emerging to begin her redemption on the spin-off series Angel. She returns to Sunnydale in season 7, not only to help Buffy and the Scoobies, but to perform in a position of leadership. In season 7 the Mayor also returns as one of the faces of the First Evil in "Lessons" and "Touched".

== Bibliography ==
- Holder, Nancy; Mariotte, Jeff; Hart, Maryelizabeth (2000). Buffy the Vampire Slayer: The Watcher's Guide, Volume 2. Pocket Books. ISBN 0-671-04260-2.
- Jowett, Lorna (2005). Sex and the Slayer: A Gender Studies Primer for the Buffy Fan. Wesleyan University Press. ISBN 978-0-8195-6758-1.
- Kaveney, Roz, ed. (2004). Reading the Vampire Slayer: The New, Updated, Unofficial Guide to Buffy and Angel. Tauris Parke Paperbacks. ISBN 1-86064-984-X.
- Ruditis, Paul (2004). Buffy the Vampire Slayer: The Watcher's Guide, Volume 3. Simon & Schuster. ISBN 0-689-86984-3.
- South, James, ed. (2003). Buffy the Vampire Slayer and Philosophy: Fear and Trembling in Sunnydale. Open Court Books. ISBN 0-8126-9531-3.
- Stafford, Nikki (2007). Bite Me! The Unofficial Guide to Buffy the Vampire Slayer. ECW Press. ISBN 978-1-55022-807-6.
- Wilcox, Rhonda (2005). Why Buffy Matters: The Art of Buffy the Vampire Slayer. I. B. Tauris. ISBN 1-84511-029-3.
- Wilcox, Rhonda; Lavery, David, eds. (2002). Fighting the Forces: What's at Stake in Buffy the Vampire Slayer. Rowman and Littlefield Publishers. ISBN 0-7425-1681-4.
