= Graduation Day (Buffy the Vampire Slayer) =

- Buffy the Vampire Slayer episodes
- Episode nos.: Season 3 Episodes 21 & 22
- Directed by: Joss Whedon
- Written by: Joss Whedon
- Production codes: 3ABB21 & 3ABB22
- Original air dates: May 18, 1999 (Part 1); July 13, 1999 (Part 2)

Guest appearances
- Kristine Sutherland as Joyce Summers (Part 1 only); Harry Groener as Mayor Richard Wilkins; Alexis Denisof as Wesley Wyndam-Pryce; Mercedes McNab as Harmony Kendall; Ethan Erickson as Percy West; Emma Caulfield as Anya (Part 1 only); Eliza Dushku as Faith Lehane; Armin Shimerman as Principal Snyder; Danny Strong as Jonathan Levinson (Part 2 only); Larry Bagby as Larry Blaisdell (Part 2 only); James Lurie as Mr. Miller (Part 1 only); Hal Robinson as Lester Worth (Part 1 only); Adrian Neil as Vamp Lackey #1 (Part 1 only); John Rosenfeld as Vamp Lackey #2 (Part 1 only); Paulo Andrés as Dr. Powell (Part 2 only); Susan Chuang as Nurse (Part 2 only); Tom Bellin as Dr. Gold (Part 2 only); Samuel Bliss Cooper as Vamp Lackey (#3) (Part 2 only)

Episode chronology
← Previous "The Prom"	Next → "The Freshman"
- Buffy the Vampire Slayer season 3

"Graduation Day" is the season finale of the third season of the drama television series Buffy the Vampire Slayer, consisting of the twenty-first and twenty-second episodes. They were written and directed by series creator Joss Whedon. "Part 1" first aired on May 18, 1999 and "Part 2" first aired on July 13, 1999; both airing on The WB. The second part was to originally be aired on May 25, 1999, but was postponed due to the episode's content and the occurrence of the Columbine High School shootings one month prior.

The episodes are the last to feature David Boreanaz and Charisma Carpenter as series regulars due to their starring in the spin-off series Angel.

== Plot ==
=== Part 1 ===
Faith kills Professor Worth on the Mayor's orders, causing Buffy and Giles to investigate. Anya reveals that she has previously seen an Ascension, explaining that the resulting demon will be much stronger than anything the group has faced. The Mayor interrupts the meeting, threatening the group. Giles stabs him, but the Mayor is unharmed due to having cast a spell of invincibility on himself. Buffy convinces Joyce to leave town for her own safety. Willow searches desperately for a spell to stop the Ascension, but finds nothing. Oz calms her down with a kiss, and they make love for the first time. Angel and Buffy raid Worth's office, finding some notes which they take to Wesley and Giles, who discover that Worth had found the bones of the demon Olvikan. Faith shoots Angel with an arrow laced with a toxin deadly to vampires, leaving Angel near death. The Watchers' Council refuses to help Angel, leading Buffy to quit the Council. Willow learns that a cure requiring the blood of a Slayer exists, so Buffy decides that Faith's blood will serve him well. The Mayor eats some insects from the Box of Gavrok, part of his preparation for the Ascension. Buffy finds Faith at her apartment and the two fight. Buffy stabs Faith, but she jumps off into a passing truck.

=== Part 2 ===
Buffy and Angel looking at each other before parting

Buffy visits Angel and forces him to drink her blood, allowing Angel to recover. He takes Buffy, now near death herself, to a hospital. Nearby, the Mayor is informed that Faith is alive but in a coma from which she may never recover. The Mayor tries to suffocate Buffy, but Angel stops him. Buffy has a dream in which Faith tells her that even the Mayor has human weaknesses. Buffy wakes up, recovered, and organizes a plan with her friends for stopping the Mayor. Wesley apologizes for his previous behavior and offers to help Buffy in the fight. Xander and Willow recruit several school students, including Jonathan, Harmony and Larry, to join their plan. Wesley tells Cordelia that he will be returning to England following the Ascension. After they awkwardly kiss, Cordelia wishes Wesley good luck and he promises to call her. The graduation ceremony begins, and during his speech the Mayor's Ascension begins, and he transforms into the monstrous serpent Olvikan. The students reveal that they are all armed, and begin an attack. Olvikan kills Principal Snyder and several students. Angel fights the Mayor’s vampires on campus and the students charge in to attack them. Buffy taunts Olvikan about Faith, drawing him into the library. Just outside, Giles detonates a bomb, destroying the demon and the school. In the aftermath, Angel leaves without saying goodbye to Buffy, although they share a final look at each other from a distance. The gang, minus Giles, gathers and Oz muses on how they all survived - not just the battle, but high school.

== Continuity ==
Myles McNutt notes various episodes which are "all part of the series’ journey to this point: "Enemies" reveals that Faith is unquestionably joined with the Mayor, while "Choices" brings the Mayor into Sunnydale High and gives him a chance to get in Angel’s head about his relationship with Buffy... And in "The Prom,” that final moment of Buffy’s school chums acknowledging her work in saving them from assured destruction on countless occasions is a nice bit of foreshadowing for where we eventually end up."

Billie Doux points out that "leaving Faith in a coma was a perfect plot device. As long as Faith is still technically alive, there will be no second slayer; and they have a great character waiting in the wings who could wake up at any time and re-enter the fray."

== Reception ==
Vox rates the episodes at #9 and #8 in a list of all 144 episodes, writing, "Part two has the big cathartic moment of the whole school coming together against the Mayor, but part one has the Buffy/Faith fight, and that just barely gives it the edge. Buffy and Faith have been mirroring each other all season — gleefully in "Bad Girls," with trepidation in "Enemies" — and when it finally comes to a head, the release of tension is astonishing. Buffy’s not just fighting for Angel’s life here — she’s puzzling out her own identity between punches."

Reviews for the BBC said Part 1 lacked energy and the build-up to the Buffy-Faith confrontation was slow. It praised the humor and menace displayed in the library scenes. Part 2 was described as suitably epic for a season finale, preparing the ground for the Angel spin-off series and building to a fast-paced and large-scale climax. The final performances of Armin Shimerman as Principal Snyder, and Harry Groener as the Mayor, and throughout the season, were noted. Noel Murray of The A.V. Club said "Graduation Day" was a "wonderfully calibrated mix of life-lessons, dramatic moments, thrilling heroics and well-observed character interactions". He complimented the performance of Harry Groener.

Billie Doux, giving the episodes of "five out of four stakes," writes that "In a sense, this was Buffy's slayer graduation," and that it "was also cool that Xander, after all the growing he did this season, got to be in charge of the Battle of Sunnydale."

Screen Rant names it an episode including some of "The Best 60 Seconds From All 7 Seasons," beginning when the students "take off their graduation gowns to reveal weapons, starting a battle that lasts for a few minutes, the first of which is the season's most exciting, as Buffy's tactics unfold bit by bit."

== Controversy ==
During the time of its airing, the episode caused a great deal of controversy in the media. The Columbine High School massacre, which took place only four weeks before the airing of Part One, was widely blamed on violence in entertainment. The WB Television Network had already pulled the plug on an earlier episode, "Earshot" (which itself was not aired until September), and feared that several scenes in "Graduation Day, Part Two" would provoke high school students to do the same thing, especially those depicting the entire graduating class handling weapons against the Mayor.

On May 25, 1999, only two hours before "Graduation Day, Part Two" was due to air, The WB suddenly decided to replace it with a re-run from earlier in the season, "Band Candy". This sudden move received huge attention in the media and thousands of letters were sent to the network demanding that the season finale be shown. Sarah Michelle Gellar publicly spoke out against the decision, Seth Green agreed that the episode should have been broadcast in its original slot. The incident was also lampooned in a segment on Comedy Central's The Daily Show in which then-host Jon Stewart joked that the episode was delayed "until the heat is off and networks can go back to being irresponsible". Stewart then quipped that "in addition to postponing the finale, WB executives are considering changing the show's name to Buffy, the Vampire Inconveniencer".

The WB did not air the episode until July 13, 1999, almost two months after it was originally scheduled; since nearly all US schools end their term in May or June, it was then felt safe. The episode attracted 6.5 million viewers, which is typically high for the WB during summer, and comparable to what the other episodes of the season had received.

As the episode was not delayed in Canada, many bootleg digital downloads were available. Joss Whedon, the creator of the show, urged, "Bootleg the puppy."

== Notes ==
1.Harmony is turned into a vampire, and Larry is killed.
2.During the Prom celebration at the Bronze, Jonathan Levinson calls Buffy to the stage and reads from a prepared speech: "We're not good friends. Most of us never found the time to get to know you, but that doesn't mean we haven't noticed you. We don't talk about it much, but it's no secret that Sunnydale High isn't really like other high schools. A lot of weird stuff happens here. But whenever there was a problem or something creepy happened, you seemed to show up and stop it. Most of the people here have been saved by you, or helped by you, at one time or another. We're proud to say that the Class of '99 has the lowest mortality rate of any graduating class in Sunnydale history." (applause from the crowd) "And we know at least part of that is because of you. So the Senior Class offers its thanks and gives you, uh, this." He hands her a small, sparkly umbrella, saying, "It's from all of us, and it has written here, Buffy Summers, Class Protector."
