= Band Candy =

- Buffy the Vampire Slayer episode
- Episode no.: Season 3 Episode 6
- Directed by: Michael Lange
- Written by: Jane Espenson
- Production code: 3ABB06
- Original air date: November 10, 1998

Guest appearances
- Kristine Sutherland as Joyce Summers; K. Todd Freeman as Mr. Trick; Robin Sachs as Ethan Rayne; Harry Groener as Mayor Richard Wilkins; Armin Shimerman as Principal Snyder; Jason Hall as Devon MacLeish; Peg Stewart as Ms. Barton

Episode chronology
← Previous "Homecoming"	Next → "Revelations"
- Buffy the Vampire Slayer season 3

"Band Candy" is the sixth episode of season three of the television show Buffy the Vampire Slayer. It was written by Jane Espenson, directed by Michael Lange, and first broadcast on The WB on November 10, 1998.

In one of the most popular Buffy episodes, the vampire Mr. Trick and English trouble-maker Ethan Rayne team up to provide a diversion — turning the adults into mental adolescents and creating an irresponsible town — so that the Mayor can pay tribute to a demon who can help him later.

== Plot ==
Principal Snyder hands out boxes of candy to all the students, which they must sell to pay for new marching band uniforms. Buffy sells half of her chocolate bars to her mom, and the other half to Giles. She then visits Angel, who is practicing tai chi. When she arrives home, Buffy finds her mother and Giles eating the band candy.

The next day, Giles fails to show up for study hall, where Xander and Willow are playing footsie. Worried, Buffy goes to Giles' home and finds her mom on the couch. Joyce offhandedly gives her the car keys to drive home, to Buffy's astonishment. Giles, now acting like he did as a teen (and being called "Ripper"), invites Joyce out for some fun.

Buffy and Willow find The Bronze packed with adults who are acting like teenagers, including Principal Snyder. They return to Giles' place to find out what is going on.

At the warehouse, the vampire Mr. Trick checks up on Ethan Rayne and the production of the chocolate bars. Trick suddenly accuses one of the workers of eating the candy, and kills him as an example to the others.

Buffy eventually puts two and two together and realizes that the candy is making everyone act like immature teenagers. She sends Willow and Oz to the library and drives to the warehouse. Upon arrival, Buffy finds her mother and Giles kissing in the middle of the street. Inside the warehouse, Buffy catches Ethan; her threat of violence persuades him to reveal that Trick needs to dull Sunnydale adults in order to collect a tribute for a demon named Lurconis. Meanwhile, four vampires enter the hospital to remove four newborn babies. Willow phones Buffy from the library and tells her that Lurconis eats babies. Giles remembers that the demon may be found in the sewers.

Down in the sewers, the Mayor and Mr. Trick wait impatiently while the four vampires chant in a ceremony to summon Lurconis. Buffy, Giles and Joyce crash the party, and the Mayor quickly flees unnoticed. Buffy fights the vampires while Giles and Joyce take the babies to safety. The huge snake-like demon appears and swallows one of the vampires whole. Giles attacks Trick, but is thrown into the path of Lurconis. Buffy pulls down a gas pipe, igniting a fire that kills the demon.

Back at his office, the Mayor asks why Trick fled, allowing Buffy to kill Lurconis. Trick replies that he thought he did the Mayor a favor by having the Slayer kill the demon, leaving one less demon to whom the Mayor would owe tribute. The Mayor warns Trick against doing him any more such favors.

The next day, the adults have returned to their senses. Buffy and Giles meet Joyce, and Buffy exclaims that they are lucky she stopped them before they did more than they did. Joyce and Giles look very embarrassed, but Buffy fails to notice.

== Themes ==
The site InsectReflection.com discusses the characters, their inner selves, and their behaviors. Of Joyce, essayist Emily (last name not given) says:

There are few demographics more underrepresented in Buffy the Vampire Slayer than Adult Female Characters. ... This is one of the few episodes, even within this season, that allows us to understand Joyce as a person, and it does this by showing us who she is outside of the role of Mother. ... She is somewhat impulsive – readily handing over her car keys to an unqualified Buffy. She is rebellious, though in a safe, teenage way that extends in its extremes to a little weed and petty theft. She is easily impressed, and eager to impress others. She tries to show off to 'Ripper' – proudly bragging of her ability to order pay-per-view, and exclaiming how "cool" and "brave" his teenage antics are."

Of Giles:

The backstory already provided for Giles in "Halloween" and "The Dark Age" establishes Giles' motivations for his ambivalent autocracy towards Buffy. ... Ripper emerges here in all his punkish glory, showing himself to be as much a real part of Giles as this Joyce is the "real" Joyce. Ripper is Giles' own Shadow Self, not incorporated into his consciousness but hidden, beneath the tweed, taking only a little magical prod to emerge and take over his entire personality. This episode is the most we ever see of Ripper, and as rip-roaringly entertaining as it is to see Anthony Stewart Head in this mode (his goading of Buffy to punch Ethan and yelp of cheer when she does so remains a real highlight), it is to the show's benefit that 'Ripper' is seen only sparingly, as it increases the impact when Giles does invoke his darker side.

And of Buffy:

Buffy is not as ready as she thinks she is. ... It's a common lesson for teenage coming-of-age stories... She is more mature than any of the candy-drunk adults in this episode – demonstrated when she has to snap Ripper, Joyce and Snyder into useful action, and takes responsible charge of the situation. ... This is not because of any special ability of Buffy – it's simply a natural effect of the structure of this genre. This is a teen drama, and it is interested in the teen perspective... one that sees teenagers as intelligent and responsible, and adults as obstinate and out of touch.

The essayist concludes, "It is this commitment to the teenage perspective that allows Buffy, and the other female characters of her age, to escape the fate of Joyce. ... This is the space where misogyny meets the honest needs of the genre."

== Cultural references ==
The website Women at Warp compares the irresponsible adults theme with the Star Trek: The Next Generation episode "The Game." "In space, a Ktarian woman introduces the Enterprise crew to a video game they can't stop playing. In Sunnydale, warlock Ethan Rayne distributes mind-altering candy, causing adults to act like teenagers. The vehicles for delivery are different, but the effect is the same: adults are rendered useless so villains can exploit the situation. In both cases, it's the younger generation (Wesley Crusher/Buffy and the Scoobies) that steps in to save the day."

When she and Willow enter the Bronze to find it full of partying adults, Buffy says, "Let's do the time warp again," the famous song from The Rocky Horror Show. Anthony Stewart Head played the mad doctor Frank N. Furter in that musical in London in 1990 and 1991.

Xander, accepting a box of candy from Snyder, asks, "You weren't visited by the Ghost of Christmas Past, by any chance?” He's referring to the Charles Dickens novel A Christmas Carol.

Buffy, protesting the idea of selling chocolate bars, says to Snyder, "I'm sure we love the idea of going all Willy Loman, but we're not in the band." Willy Loman is a character in Arthur Miller's play Death of a Salesman.

Principal Snyder says, "Call me Snyder. Just a last name. Like Barbarino." Vinnie Barbarino was a character played by John Travolta in the TV series Welcome Back, Kotter.

Buffy, complaining to Willow, says, "I'm putting in Mom time. She's been drastic ever since I got back. And Giles is even worse. I'm supervised 24-7. It's like being in the Real World house, only real." It was an MTV reality TV show which films a group of strangers, living in a house together, who are under constant supervision.

Some adults, including Willow's doctor, sing "Louie, Louie" by The Kingsmen on stage at The Bronze.

== Continuity ==
Snyder and the Mayor almost certainly know Buffy is the Slayer now, if they didn't before.

Giles's tattoo, the Mark of Eyghon, was revealed in "The Dark Age" and is later seen in "Goodbye Iowa."

While under the band candy influence, Giles and Joyce have sex on the hood of a police car. Buffy discovers this in "Earshot" when she reads her mother's mind, and mentions it again to Giles when she's in Faith's body in "Who Are You?"

Joyce tells Giles she likes his music albums, which are also approved by Oz and Xander in the episode "The Harsh Light of Day." Giles is playing "Tales of Brave Ulysses" by Cream; he plays it again in "Forever.”

== Reception ==
The episode was well received, becoming a fan favorite.

Reviewer Brett White enthuses, "Zombies, monsters, snazzy vampires, our heroine had seen it and slayed it week in and week out without breaking a sweat or a nail. And then came "Band Candy." ... In the episode, written by Buffy's comedy maven Jane Espenson, all the adults in Sunnydale got mentally and emotionally de-aged back to their hormonal teenage selves. ... Band Candy isn't a totally essential episode of Buffy, but it's still a fan favorite. Truthfully, all of Espenson's episodes are comedy classics, packed with some of the best one-liners in the entire series."

Vox ranked it at #21 on their "Every Episode Ranked From Worst to Best" list (to mark the 20th anniversary of the show), writing, "In true Buffy form, the candy-induced chaos is a distraction to allow the Mayor’s cronies to steal babies to feed to a giant snake demon, but it’s also a fun showcase for some of the older actors and a wry commentary on just how much responsibility the teenage Buffy shoulders on a regular basis — even if her mom still doesn’t think she should be allowed to drive a car." Paste Magazine, in a similar list, ranked it at #25 and called it "hugely funny—for which writer Jane Espenson is justifiably famous." Rolling Stone ranked it at #43, saying, "Rayne's scheme gives us badass Giles, chic Joyce, and Principal Snyder being a desperate hanger-on. One of the most fun episodes throughout Buffy."

Noel Murray of The A.V. Club writes that the episode "shows an alternate version of Sunnydale that's grounded in the town's own dark reality. Or as Oz says, 'Sobering mirror to look into, huh?'"
