= Faith (Buffy the Vampire Slayer) =

Character from Buffy the Vampire Slayer

Faith Lehane
- Buffy the Vampire Slayer / Angel character
- Eliza Dushku as Faith
- First appearance: "Faith, Hope & Trick" (1998)
- Last appearance: Finale (2018)
- Created by: Joss Whedon; David Greenwalt
- Portrayed by: Eliza Dushku
- Voiced by: Eliza Dushku

In-universe information
- Affiliation: Watchers' Council; Scooby Gang; Mayor Wilkins; Wolfram & Hart
- Classification: Slayer
- Notable powers: Supernatural strength, speed, stamina, agility, and reflexes Rapid healing Prophetic dreams

Faith Lehane is a fictional character created by Joss Whedon for the television series Buffy the Vampire Slayer. Played by actress Eliza Dushku, Faith was introduced in the third season of Buffy and was a focus of that season's overarching plot. She returned for shorter story arcs on Buffy and its spin-off, Angel. The character's story is continued in the comic book series Buffy the Vampire Slayer Season Eight, and she also appears in apocryphal material such as other comic books and novels. Faith was set to receive her own spin-off television series after the final season of Buffy, but Eliza Dushku declined the offer, and the series was never made. The character later co-stars in the 25-issue comic book Angel & Faith beginning in August 2011 under the banner of Buffy the Vampire Slayer Season Nine, the story taking place mostly in London and the surrounding area. Seven years after the character's creation, Whedon granted her the surname Lehane for a role-playing game and subsequent material. The last issue of Season Eight was the first source officially confirmed to be canon that referred to Faith by her full name.

Faith is a Slayer: a girl endowed with supernatural abilities and destined to battle evil creatures such as vampires and demons. Created as a foil to the protagonist, Buffy Summers, she is a Slayer who comes from a damaged background and often makes the wrong decision. Initially an ally to the main characters, events take a toll on Faith's sanity and she slips into a villainous role. Later storylines show her regaining her mental health that makes her remorseful for her past crimes, and with the benevolent vampire Angel's help she eventually rejoins the side of good in the hopes of achieving redemption, reaching full maturity and becoming a hero in her own right.

== Appearances ==
=== Television ===
In Buffy the Vampire Slayer season 3, Faith arrives in Sunnydale, having been activated as the Slayer by the death of Kendra (Bianca Lawson) (who was activated by Buffy's temporary death in the first season) in the episode "Becoming, Part One". Coming from a traumatic and abusive background, Faith tries to fit in with Buffy (Sarah Michelle Gellar) and her friends, but becomes increasingly isolated and bitter as the season progresses. A major turning point for the character occurs in the mid-season episode "Bad Girls"; while trying to show Buffy the fun side of slaying, Faith accidentally kills Deputy Mayor Allan Finch (Jack Plotnick), a human being whom she mistakes for a vampire, and is heedless of Buffy's attempts to get her to admit that she made a terrible mistake. Feeling more alienated than ever, she betrays the Scooby Gang and allies herself with the villainous Mayor of Sunnydale (Harry Groener), eventually forming a sincere father-daughter relationship with him. After Faith tries to murder Buffy's vampire lover Angel (David Boreanaz) under the mayor's orders, the two Slayers finally battle it out in the season finale, a confrontation which leaves Faith alive but comatose.

Faith returns to Buffy for two episodes in the fourth season. Waking up from her coma, she seeks revenge on Buffy by switching their bodies using a mystical device called the Draconian Katra left to her by the now-deceased Mayor. As Buffy is taken into custody by the Watchers' Council for crimes she did not commit, Faith discovers for the first time what it is like to be surrounded by loving friends and family, and Buffy starts to understand Faith despite being upset with her predicament. After feeling obliged to rescue a church full of people from vampires, Faith battles Buffy once again, expressing extreme self-hatred before being returned to her own body. The storyline is continued in the first season of spin-off series Angel, as Faith escapes to Los Angeles and is hired by Wolfram & Hart to assassinate Angel. Instead, she plots an intricate plan to have Angel kill her, but Angel convinces her to face the consequences of her actions, bonds with her as a friend and ally due to their similarities, and helps her on the path to redemption. Faith hands herself over to the police and she is sentenced to prison, where Angel later visits her.

In Angel season 4, Angel is reverted to the evil Angelus after having his soul removed. Faith is approached by her former Watcher, Wesley Wyndam-Pryce (Alexis Denisof), who informs her of Angelus's presence, sparking her to break out of prison and help them. Wanting to help Angel the way he helped her, Faith injects herself with a mystical drug and feeds herself to Angelus in order to incapacitate him so that their allies can work to restore his soul. She nearly dies from the drug, but during a psychic mind walk, Angel persuades her subconscious not to give up and that life is worth living.

The character of Faith is expanded upon in media outside of the television series, such as the Buffy Season Eight comic book.

Afterwards, a recovered Faith travels back to Sunnydale, where she plays a significant role in the battle against the First Evil in the final season of Buffy the Vampire Slayer. In these episodes, she reconciles with Buffy, although their relationship is tested when the Potential Slayers appoint Faith as their leader over Buffy. This decision later proves disastrous when Faith's plan leads them into a trap, leaving several girls dead. She and the survivors are saved by Buffy, and the two finally make peace with one another. After a one-night stand with school principal Robin Wood (D.B. Woodside), the two begin a romantic relationship when they both survive the battle in the series finale. Faith was set to receive her own spin-off following the end of Buffy, which, according to Tim Minear, would have featured Faith "probably on a motorcycle, crossing the Earth, trying to find her place in the world." However, Eliza Dushku chose to take other offers for her post-Buffy career.

=== Literature ===
Faith made appearances in various Buffy and Angel comic books and novels. In the Buffy the Vampire Slayer comic book story "Haunted", an imprisoned Faith reveals to Angel her memories of being in a coma between Buffy seasons three and four; she shared a psychic link with the Mayor's spirit and could see him attacking people through his eyes. "Note from the Underground" sees Faith being temporarily released from jail into Angel's custody, in order to help Buffy defeat the demonic fascists, the Scourge. Buffy the Vampire Slayer: The Faith Trials, Vol. 1 is a novelization of Buffy season 3 episodes which center around Faith, including "Faith, Hope & Trick", "Bad Girls", and "Consequences". These episodes focus specifically on Faith's arrival in Sunnydale, and her subsequent turn to the dark side following the death of the Deputy Mayor. Faith appeared prominently in her own 2006 novel Go Ask Malice: A Slayer's Diary by Robert Joseph Levy, which elaborates on Faith's back-story in South Boston and how she came to be the Slayer. Written in diary format, it fleshes out many areas of Faith's past which were only alluded to in the show, such as her alcoholic mother's abuse, her previous relationships, and her first Watcher's gruesome death at the hands of the vampire Kakistos. Author Robert Joseph Levy describes writing the book, "I wanted to explore the choices she made and the choices that were taken away from her, and how they affected her mental state and her development from Potential to Chosen before she arrived." Expanded Universe material such as this is not usually considered canonical unless otherwise stated.

Faith is featured in the ongoing comic book, Buffy the Vampire Slayer Season Eight (2007–11), which serves as a canonical continuation of the television series. In the storyline "No Future For You", Faith goes undercover on a mission from Giles to assassinate rogue Slayer Genevieve "Gigi" Savidge, who plans to usurp Buffy's position as leader to the Slayers. Instead, Faith forms an unexpected connection with Gigi and finds herself torn between her new friend and her old enemy. When Gigi discovers her true identity, Faith unintentionally kills her in battle, and the arc ends with Faith finding a new purpose alongside Giles, helping slayers so they won't go down the path she and Gigi did. Faith and Giles later reappear over a year later in "Safe", which recounts one of their missions in Germany. Faith reconvenes with Buffy to face the threats of the villain Twilight in "Retreat", and is captured alongside Giles and Andrew by Twilight. As such, she is witness to the reveal that Twilight is in fact Angel in "Twilight, Part II". In the final story arc, "Last Gleaming", Faith battles in the ruins of Sunnydale alongside other Scooby Gang members and Slayers. Underground however, Angel—possessed by the Twilight entity—snaps Giles' neck in order to prevent the destruction of its power source; a grief-stricken Buffy destroys it however, Angel is freed from Twilight's possession, and magic is mostly cut off from the universe. In the final issue, set some time later, per Giles' will, all of his worldly assets, save a book, have been left to Faith. In Faith's care is a distraught Angel, whom she intends to rehabilitate.

Following Season Eight, Faith received her own title in Angel & Faith (2011–2013), a companion series to Season Nine. The story depicts Angel and Faith, as residents in Giles' London home, attending to his unfinished business and fighting the forces of evil in London while Angel covertly pursues a plan to resurrect Giles. Faith takes on the role of mentor to a group of Slayers, but those relationships are strained by her friendship with Angel. Ultimately, the group are successful in resurrecting Giles (albeit as a young boy), as well as averting the apocalypse. The story ends with Faith deciding to take some time alone to find herself. She is next seen in Buffy the Vampire Slayer Season Ten (2014–2016), when she brings Giles to reconnect with Buffy, and is hurt when Giles coldly tells her that his first priority is Buffy. In the accompanying second volume of Angel & Faith, Faith initially finds a home for herself in Kennedy's Slayer private security firm, and while working with them, is troubled by her mission to rescue Riley Finn, whom she slept with while posing as Buffy some years ago. Ultimately, she returns to London to fight alongside Angel against the ancient demon Archaeus, who had been terrorising London.

== Concept and creation ==
"I know Faith's not going to be on the cover of Sanity Fair, but... she had it rough. Different circumstances, that could be me."

— Buffy empathizes with Faith in "Doppelgangland", echoing the intended parallels between the two Slayers.

The initial concept for Faith's character was "the road not taken", a Slayer who makes the wrong choices in life. She is intended to be a reflection of Buffy, and what Buffy could have become were it not for her support system of friends and family. The question the writers wanted to answer was, despite being made from the same "raw materials," how would upbringing and environment affect the type of people they would become later in life? Joss Whedon describes her as everything Buffy would never let herself become; although Buffy is tempted by Faith's approach to slaying, she ultimately decides not to make the same choices herself. Some fans argued that the show developed a lesbian subtext between Faith and Buffy; Jane Espenson states that Whedon says he didn't intend this, but admitted it was there after he had it pointed out to him, jokingly attributing this to his subconscious.

With Faith, the writers explored the nature of power, and the boundaries and consequences of its use. They wanted to address the issue that, whether the creatures a Slayer kills are good or evil, she is still a professional killer. Co-executive producer Doug Petrie, and writer of Faith-centric episodes such as "Revelations" and "Bad Girls", says one of the things he loves about the character is that Faith is not wrong in describing herself and Buffy as killers. He goes on to discuss a Slayer's rights and responsibilities, and how Faith believes her contributions to society relieve her of any legal or moral responsibilities, a view which Buffy does not share. When writing Faith, Petrie looked to Frank Miller's violent Marvel Comics character Elektra Natchios for inspiration, claiming, "In a different, teen, punkier context, Faith is so much like Elektra."

Known only as "Faith" during the television series; she was not given a surname until 2005, seven years after her first appearance. Joss Whedon was approached by Eden Studios to create surnames for Faith and Kendra to use in a Buffy the Vampire Slayer role-playing game, and chose "Lehane" for Faith, because he wanted something "southie".

== Characterization ==
Actress Eliza Dushku describes Faith as the "working class" Slayer, a reason she feels so many people identify with her. She was written as a sympathetic character; with Doug Petrie claiming "I connected with Faith early on. I love that character. She's totally tragic." According to Petrie, "The whole key to Faith is that she's in pain. If you took that away, she would be a monster. But she's so lonely and so desperate, and all of her toughness comes out of trying to cover that. That's what real monsters are made of. No one thinks they're really a monster." Petrie claims Faith's main motivation is to find a family and friends; she sees treacherous Watcher Gwendolyn Post as the mother she never had, the Scooby Gang as the friends she never had, and the Mayor as the father she never had. "So, she's always looking for a family and always coming up short and making these horrible choices, and it drove her insane" says Petrie. "Plus, I think she was missing a couple of screws to begin with. 'If you don't love me, you will fear me,' is kind of her m.o. She's not a stable girl, but a fun one." Petrie describes the character's name as "wildly ironic", due to her cynical nature. According to Petrie, "She's the most faithless character we've got. She doesn't trust herself or anyone around her. We try to do that a lot with our monsters. It's much more fun if you look at it from their point of view."

Writer Jane Espenson believes one of the reasons why Faith elicits sympathy from the audience is the father/daughter relationship between her and the mayor, comparing their affection for one another to that between vampires Spike and Drusilla in the earlier season. The writers wanted to make both Faith and the Mayor as human as possible by showing they need connection and love as much as the heroic characters. Eliza Dushku asserts that Faith's bond with the mayor stems from him being one of the few people in her life who does not put her down, which is something she has battled with her whole life; Dushku goes on to say Faith's misplaced trust in the Mayor "leads her into being crazier".

In the Angel season 1 episode "Sanctuary", Faith forms a bond with the vampire-with-a-soul Angel; executive producer David Greenwalt explains Angel can help her because he alone is able to understand the suffering she has been through and how to help her atone for her sins. Faith is then able to return the favor in Angel's fourth season, when she is the only one determined to defeat Angel's soulless alter ego Angelus without killing him in the process. Actor David Boreanaz explains, "I think having a character like Faith come back at a pivotal point when she finds out Angelus is loose is really, for her character, a way of saying: 'I'm paying you back, Angel, for saving me, therefore, I'm gonna save you.'" The writers believed it would be an interesting dynamic to have former "bad girl" Faith play a heroic role against the show's now villainous protagonist, Angel.

"Much as I love Buffy, I'm way happier writing flawed, damaged people who don't always make the right decisions. Faith is such a complex, beautiful character."

— Brian K. Vaughan explains what attracted him to the character.

Faith was brought back for the final season of Buffy, because, according to David Solomon, "she had been such a crucial character at a very specific junction in the series that there would be no way to tie it up without her." However, in season 7 the dynamic between the two Slayers has changed. As Rebecca Rand Kirshner explains, "[Faith] is no longer such a complete opposite of Buffy. And there's sort of a subtler and more complicated dynamic between them". As Buffy struggles with her unwanted position of mentor to the Potential Slayers, the writers used Faith to create an outside conflict about Buffy's leadership abilities. Although Faith is questioning Buffy and her choices she is making, she is no longer an enemy to her either. In the episode "Empty Places", the Potentials lose trust in Buffy and appoint Faith as their leader instead, a decision that literally blows up in their faces. As Drew Goddard explains, "Faith is like the cool aunt that everyone loves, because the cool aunt doesn't have the responsibility of raising the children. She just gets to show up and have fun. The problem is, Faith is not ready to lead. She's damaged in her own way. She's just beginning to pull herself together. As much as she wants to be Buffy, she has to learn how to become Faith."

When writing Go Ask Malice, author Robert Joseph Levy encountered a number of issues to negotiate in writing a back-story for Faith. One of these was retaining the mystery of the character; Levy explains many aspects of Faith's background, such as her delinquency and promiscuity, are supposed to be assumed by the viewers of the show, and he didn't want to spell everything out by writing a "case study" of her. In order to do something non-traditional, Levy chose to tell the story in a diary format, watching many episodes of the television series to get a hold on the natural cadence of her voice. He reveals he looked to Faith herself in order to overcome his fear of writing such a popular character, "She's not hesitant and in a lot of ways, I took a lot of inspiration from the character itself in terms of creative process — to really go for it and be strong in my choices".

== Appearances ==
Faith has 105 canonical appearances in the Buffyverse.

=== Television ===
Eliza Dushku guest starred as Faith in 26 episodes of television.

Buffy the Vampire Slayer

- Season 3 (1998–99): Faith, Hope & Trick, Beauty and the Beasts, Homecoming, Revelations, Amends, The Zeppo, Bad Girls, Consequences, Doppelgängland, Enemies, Choices, Graduation Day, Part One, Graduation Day, Part Two
- Season 4 (2000): This Year's Girl, Who Are You?
- Season 7 (2003): Dirty Girls, Empty Places, Touched, End of Days, Chosen

Angel

- Season 1 (2000): Five by Five, Sanctuary
- Season 2 (2000): Judgment
- Season 4 (2003): Salvage, Release, Orpheus

=== Comics ===
Faith has appeared in 79 canonical issues of comics.

Buffy the Vampire Slayer

- Season 8 (2007, 2009–11): No Future for You, Safe, Retreat, Turbulence, Twilight, Last Gleaming
- Season 9 (2013): Willow: Wonderland, Part 4
- Season 10 (2014): New Rules, Parts 1-2
- Season 11 (2017): Ordinary People, The Great Escape, Crimes Against Nature, Revelations, One Girl in All the World
- Season 12 (2018): One Year Later, Future Shock, The Reckoning, Finale

Angel & Faith

- Season 9 (2011–13): Live Through This, In Perfect Harmony, Daddy Issues, Women of a Certain Age, Family Reunion, Death and Consequences, Spike and Faith, What You Want Not What You Need
- Season 10 (2014–16): Where the River Meets the Sea, Lost and Found, United, Those Who Can't Teach, Teach Gym, A Little More than Kin, A Tale of Two Families

Buffy the Vampire Slayer (Boom - Universe) (2019–2022)

- Buffy the Vampire Slayer #15 - #25
- Buffy the Vampire Slayer: Faith
- Buffy the Vampire Slayer 25th Anniversary Special

The Vampire Slayer

- The Vampire Slayer #2 #4 #5 #7 #8

== See also ==
- Women warriors in literature and culture
