= Watcher (Buffy the Vampire Slayer) =

- Buffy the Vampire Slayer character
- Screenshot of two Watchers: Wesley (left) and Giles (right) in "Bad Girls" (1999).
- First appearance: "Buffy the Vampire Slayer" (1992) (non-canon) "Welcome to the Hellmouth" (1997)
- Created by: Joss Whedon
- Portrayed by: Donald Sutherland (non-canon), Anthony Head, Richard Riehle, Alexis Denisof, Harris Yulin, Serena Scott Thomas, Cynthia Lamontagne, Kris Iyer, Oliver Muirhead, Rob Nagle, Michael Halsey, Tom Lenk

In-universe information
- Affiliation: Watchers' Council
- Classification: Human
- Notable powers: Moderate fighting techniques and superior knowledge of demonology, sorcery, the black arts, and magical artifacts.

In the fictional universe of the television series' Buffy the Vampire Slayer and Angel, a Watcher is a member of a secret organization of parapsychologists: "The Watchers' Council", which seeks to prepare the Slayer to fight demonic forces. A notable example of a Watcher is Buffy main character Rupert Giles. They are typically modelled after the fictional character Abraham Van Helsing from Bram Stoker's novel Dracula.

== Description ==
Watchers are devoted to tracking and fighting malevolent supernatural entities, particularly vampires, primarily by locating individuals with the talents required to combat such beings and emerge victorious. More specifically, Watchers are assigned to Slayers, girls who are part of a succession of mystically powered individuals destined to confront these foes. Upon a Slayer's demise, the next Slayer is called into duty and assigned a Watcher.

The Watchers' Council trains new Watchers in a private school of sorts. In "Never Kill a Boy on the First Date," Giles implies that Watchers are, to a certain extent, "called" or assigned to become Watchers before attending university. This concept is supported by Watcher families like the Giles and Wyndam-Pryces.

Rupert Giles was Buffy's Watcher at the beginning of the series. It was revealed that he had never been invited to the Watchers' retreat. After being fired by the Council for having "a father's love" for the Slayer in season 3, he remained her unofficial Watcher for the rest of the series. Wesley Wyndam-Pryce became Buffy and Faith's Watcher for a short period. Wyndam-Pryce was fired after Faith turned rogue and Buffy "quit". Rupert Giles was reinstated as Buffy's official Watcher in the season 5 episode "Checkpoint," and he remains so until the events at the end of season 5, though Giles maintains his contacts with Buffy.

== Powers and abilities ==
A standard Watcher has at least some proficiency in the use of magic, with certain individuals being more powerful than others. One episode in Angel (Sanctuary) reveals that numerous members of the board of directors are alchemists. They are students of demonology and as such have a wide knowledge of various incarnations of evil, but their expertise is usually the vampire. They are also highly educated and can speak a wide variety of languages, both human and demonic in nature.

Watchers are typically well versed in hand-to-hand combat techniques, though they generally confine themselves to training Slayers or supporting them in battles, as their lower strength relatively limits their effectiveness in directly engaging vampires.

== Shadow Men ==
The Shadow Men

In ancient times, a group known as the Shadow Men used magic to infuse a captive girl with the essence of a demon, thereby creating the First Slayer, whom they use to fight demonic forces. The descendants of the Shadow Men go on to form the Watchers' Council.

In 2003, Slayer Buffy Anne Summers uses a strange mystical device to meet with the Shadow Men about the threat she faces from the First Evil, where she learns how the Slayers were created. They attempt to repeat history by infusing an unwilling Buffy with the same demonic essence that they used on the First Slayer to increase her power; however, Buffy refused, as she had come to seek only knowledge, not power, especially if that power meant that she would lose her humanity. After Buffy defeats them, one of the Shadow Men gives Buffy what she wants: knowledge of what is coming. He shows her a vision of the First's army of Turok-Han in the Hellmouth, causing her to start to reconsider her decision, but she is brought back by her friends before she can do anything else.

The Shadow Men first appeared in Fray issue #3 and were later shown onscreen in the episode "Get It Done".

== Watchers' Council ==
Watchers' Council
- The Watchers' Council, assembled at their headquarters
- First appearance: "Welcome to the Hellmouth"
- Last appearance: "Never Leave Me"
- Created by: Joss Whedon

In-universe information
- Purpose: Find, train, and support The Vampire Slayer
- Membership: Key members: Rupert Giles; Quentin Travers; Wesley Wyndam-Pryce; Merrick; Andrew Wells

The Watchers' Council of Britain is an organization dedicated to finding, training, and supervising Slayers. Over the years, however, the Council has become increasingly arrogant and egocentric, believing themselves to be the supreme authority while the Slayers are just their tools.

The Council eventually bases its headquarters in London, England. It tries to locate potential Slayers and then send Watchers to inform and train them. It is not always successful in doing so, and therefore some Slayers are fully trained when they are called, while others know nothing of the heritage or purpose of their power. Each potential Slayer is assigned her own Watcher – a Council employee who is responsible for training the Slayer in combat techniques as well as researching demons, vampires, and magics. Watchers also maintain diaries chronicling the lives of the Slayers under their charge.

In late 2002, the Council learns that The First is systematically eliminating potential Slayers around the world in an effort to end the Slayer line. Unfortunately, before this information can be acted on, the Council headquarters is destroyed by agents of The First, specifically Caleb – "At long last. All this time. All the work I've done for you... Blowing up the Council". The Council leadership is killed, and the Council is not able to offer assistance in the struggle against The First.

In the aftermath of the battle with the army of The First and the destruction of the Sunnydale Hellmouth, the Watchers' Council begins the process of rebuilding. The work to be done is considerable, especially in light of the creation of hundreds of active Slayers around the world. The structure of this new Council is unknown, but it appears that Rupert Giles is its new head and is training Andrew Wells as a Watcher. Only three members of the Watchers' Council have been shown to have survived the First's attacks: Rupert Giles; an acquaintance to him named Robson who survived a Bringer attack; and Roger Wyndham-Pryce. His son, Wesley, and Rutherford Sirk were ex-members of the Council and thus not targeted by the First Evil.

In the canonical comic Buffy the Vampire Slayer Season Eight, Giles informs Faith that he is, for all intents and purposes, the Watcher's Council. Andrew, Xander Harris, and Robin Wood are functioning as Watchers (though Xander dislikes that term and insists that others do not call him such), assisting in the training and supervision of the new Slayers in separate squads around the world (Rome, Scotland, and Cleveland respectively). Their duties have expanded to monitoring Slayers as well; Giles offers Faith Lehane a new identity in exchange for her undertaking the mission to kill Genevieve Savidge, a sociopathic Slayer. Later, the two form a "Slayer social worker" program to try to prevent more Slayers from going rogue.

According to the comic Fray, a Slayer in the 21st century banishes all demons and magics from the world. When evil returns, a new Slayer – Melaka Fray – is called. The Watchers' Council in this era apparently retains the resources to locate Slayers. Melaka Fray is approached by her assigned Watcher, but rather than assist or train her, he immolates himself in front of her. Melaka is instead trained by a demon who says that the remaining Council consists of fanatics and fools.

=== Methods ===
The Watchers' Council has been known to use ethically questionable methods to accomplish its goals. The Council employs a trio of operatives known as the Special Operations Team. This team is responsible for some of the more unsavory aspects of the Council's work, such as interrogations, smuggling, and, if necessary, assassinations. When Faith Lehane stakes and kills a human, the Special Ops Team was dispatched to retrieve the rogue Slayer, circumventing local and international authorities.

The Council is also known for placing its principles and perceived goals ahead of the well-being of the Slayer. A test known as the Cruciamentum involves suppressing the Slayer's natural abilities with a drug and pitting her against a particularly dangerous vampire on the Slayer's eighteenth birthday in order to test the Slayer's intelligence and practical capabilities. When one particular Watcher, Rupert Giles, defies the rules of the test and interferes in the Cruciamentum of his Slayer – Buffy Summers – he is dismissed from his position immediately.

In 2001, representatives of the Council visit Sunnydale, California to deliver vital information on the seemingly unstoppable Glory to the Slayer, Buffy Summers. However, the Council refuses to turn over the information until an extensive review of Buffy's abilities is completed. This assessment includes a review of Buffy's combat skills, as well as interviews with many of her closest friends. Eventually, the Slayer turns the tables on the Watchers, declaring that they need her to validate their existence more than she needs their help. She defends the frequent assistance of her friends (Slayers typically operate alone) and demands that Rupert Giles be reinstated as her Watcher, with retroactive pay to the time of his dismissal. The Council agrees to this, changing the nature of the Council/Slayer relationship until the Council's destruction two years later.

When the Scoobies rebuilt the Council after the war with the First, they did so under better circumstances. Thus, the new Council is far more moral and ethical, in contrast to the moral ambiguity of the original.

== Guardians ==
The Guardians is an organization of long-lived women who developed parallel to the Shadow Men and Watchers. They forge a weapon, the Scythe, for the Slayer to use. They are apparently mistrustful of the Shadow Men and Watchers who followed, as they keep this weapon, along with their very existence, a secret. They allow the Watchers to observe and manage the Slayer for centuries, but all the while the Guardians are watching the Watchers. They remain in hiding until Buffy Summers discovers the Scythe and tracks its origin to an Egyptian-style tomb, where the last Guardian waits. Immediately after explaining herself to Buffy, the Guardian is killed by Caleb, putting an end to the organization.

== List of Watchers ==
Note: Some Slayers have had more than one Watcher in the course of their careers.

Watcher	Slayer(s)	First appearance (as a Watcher)
Merrick	Buffy Summers	Buffy the Vampire Slayer (non-canon), "Becoming, Part One"
Giles, Rupert	Buffy Summers and Faith Lehane	"Welcome to the Hellmouth"
Zabuto, Roger "Sam"	Kendra Young	Mentioned in "What's My Line, Part One"
Post, Gwendolyn*	Faith Lehane	"Revelations"
Wyndam-Pryce, Wesley	Buffy Summers and Faith Lehane	"Bad Girls"
Travers, Quentin	none (chairman of the Council)	"Helpless"
Crowley, Bernard	Nikki Wood	Mentioned in "First Date"
Sirk, Rutherford	Unknown	"Home"
Wyndam-Pryce, Roger	Unknown	Appears as a robot in "Lineage"
Wells, Andrew	Many	"Damage"

* Watcher fraudulently "assigned" herself to Faith after being expelled from the Council.

The following have been featured with no significant details known about them. Not all of these are true Watchers, some of them are merely operatives on payroll.

- Blair
- Hobson
- Lydia—Wrote a thesis on William the Bloody
- Nigel
- Phillip
- Robson
- Faith's first Watcher
- Giles' father
- Giles' paternal grandmother (named Edna in a Tales of the Vampires comic by Joss Whedon)
- Collins, Weatherby and Smith—The Council Special Ops Team
- Faith's nurse
- Wesley's thugs

The (non-canon) novels and comics, especially those focusing on previous Slayers, show or mention other Watchers including: Michaela Tomassi (The Gatekeeper trilogy), Archibald Lassiter (Giles), Harold and John Travers (Pretty Maids All in a Row), Yanna Narvik (watched over the Slayer, Sophie Carstensen in Pretty Maids All in a Row), Marie-Christine Fontaine (watched Slayer, Eleanor Boudreau in Pretty Maids All in a Row), Diana Dormer (the name given to Faith's first Watcher in Go Ask Malice).

== Interpretation ==
=== The Watcher's Council as a religious organization ===
J'annine Jobling believes that there is a parallel between the Watcher's Council and religious organizations, because they are "bound by tradition and hierarchy", while Buffy and her friends act more democratically and are motivated by love. James Rocha and Mona Rocha add that members of the Council do not even question the institution, which for them is always right. They are valuing their old customs and do not want to change it. They portray themselves in a very positive way and believe in their own portrayal. This makes them unable to do any moral thinking and leads them to betraying the values, they pretend to have.

== See also ==
- Slayer
- Rupert Giles
- Wesley Wyndam-Pryce
- Watcher (Highlander)
