= Bad Girls (Buffy the Vampire Slayer) =

- Buffy the Vampire Slayer episode
- Episode no.: Season 3 Episode 14
- Directed by: Michael Lange
- Written by: Doug Petrie
- Production code: 3ABB14
- Original air date: February 9, 1999

Guest appearances
- Kristine Sutherland as Joyce Summers; Harry Groener as Mayor Richard Wilkins; K. Todd Freeman as Mr. Trick; Jack Plotnick as Deputy Mayor Allan Finch; Alexis Denisof as Wesley Wyndam-Pryce; Christian Clemenson as Balthazar; Eliza Dushku as Faith Lehane; Alex Skuby as Vincent; Wendy Clifford as Mrs. Taggert; Ron Rogge as Cop

Episode chronology
← Previous "The Zeppo"	Next → "Consequences"
- Buffy the Vampire Slayer season 3

"Bad Girls" is episode fourteen of season three of the television series Buffy the Vampire Slayer. It was written by Doug Petrie, directed by Michael Lange, and first broadcast on February 9, 1999 on The WB.

Buffy gets a new Watcher, and Faith lures Buffy into reckless abandon.

== Plot ==
While out patrolling, Buffy and Faith kill a vampire who was armed with swords, one short and one long. The next day in the school library, Buffy's supercilious new Watcher, Wesley Wyndam-Pryce, identifies the swords as belonging to a cult of swordsman vampires, who were once led by a demon named Balthazar. Wesley instructs Buffy to retrieve an amulet that belonged to Balthazar, whom he believes to be dead.

That night Buffy finds the amulet, but a group of Balthazar's vampires arrive before she can take it. Faith impulsively jumps into the vampire nest and is joined in the fight by Buffy, who finds the amulet. After handing it over to Wesley, Buffy leaves to take a school test. She repeatedly tries to tell Willow and Xander about the previous night and notices Xander twitch whenever she mentions Faith's name. Faith shows up at the classroom window and she and Buffy leave to destroy another vampire nest. Exhilarated, the two go dancing at the Bronze, where Buffy meets up with Angel. He tells her that Balthazar is alive and looking for his amulet. When Wesley arrives, she takes the amulet from him and gives it to Angel for safekeeping.

Buffy and Faith find Balthazar (an obese demon who lives in a vat of water) surrounded by his vampires, so they break into a sports equipment store to steal weapons. The police arrive and arrest them, but the two slayers break out of the car, causing it to crash and injure the police officers. The following morning, the Mayor is attacked by one of Balthazar's vampires, who is foiled by Mr. Trick.

Balthazar demands his minions bring him the watchers, kill the slayers, and bring him his amulet. The enemy who crippled him is about to gain ultimate power and he refuses to let this come to pass. Willow presents Buffy with a protection spell and is ready to go slaying that night, but Buffy tells her that it is too dangerous and that she is going with Faith instead. The two run into several vampires and stake them, then Allan, the mayor's human deputy, grabs Buffy so Faith stakes him too. He dies before anything can be done and the slayers scatter. Buffy runs into Angel who tells her about Balthazar capturing Giles, while Faith returns to Allan's body.

Balthazar questions the two watchers as to who has his amulet. Wesley is willing to tell him, but does not know Angel's name. Angel shows up with Buffy, frees Giles and a fight breaks out. When Balthazar captures Angel, Buffy tosses live wires into his tub of water, electrocuting him. With his dying breath, Balthazar warns them of his enemy. In his office that night, the Mayor performs a ritual that makes him unable to be killed. Buffy tries to talk to Faith about Allan's death, but Faith has disposed of the body and says she does not care.

== Production ==
Alexis Denisof met Alyson Hannigan as a result of being cast as Wesley, and the two married on October 11, 2003. Denisof's role on Buffy would also lead him to become a regular cast member on the spin-off, Angel.

=== Writing ===
After Faith accidentally kills Allan, Buffy finds her in her hotel room obsessively scrubbing his blood from her shirt. As Richardson and Rabb note, this scene is reminiscent of Lady Macbeth's "equally futile attempt to wash away guilt by washing away its physical signs". When Buffy reminds Faith that "you can shut off all the emotions that you want... but eventually, they're gonna find a body," she is referring to the authorities finding Allan's body; however the ambiguous grammar suggests that it is Faith's emotions of guilt and shame that will eventually find a body as well.

== Reception ==
Vox, rating it at #26 in the list of all 144 episodes, writes:

"With Faith embracing the role of Buffy’s Evil Twin Slayer counterpart, this episode lets Buffy embrace the wild streak inherent in being a teen with superpowers, as she and Faith go slaying and dancing whenever the hell they feel like it. And for being an episode that both introduces Wesley at his stodgiest and ends with Faith accidentally stabbing a human man in the heart — an event that immediately sends shockwaves throughout the show — 'Bad Girls' is a significant episode executed with serious balancing skills."

A review for the BBC said the scene where Allan is killed "signals a fundamental change to a more mature series". It also said that Faith, who was initially concerned about the death, subsequently sheds all sense of responsibility and that without the death, Buffy might easily have become like Faith.
