= Slayer (Buffy the Vampire Slayer) =

Profession and power in Buffy the Vampire Slayer

- Buffy the Vampire Slayer race
- First appearance: "Buffy the Vampire Slayer" (1992) (non-canon) "Welcome to the Hellmouth" (1997)
- Created by: Joss Whedon

In-universe information
- Other names: Vampire Slayer, The Chosen One, Potentials
- Home world: Buffyverse
- Type: Female humans with powers
- Distinctions: Prophetic dreaming; Ability to sense demonic presence; Innate hand-to-hand and weapons combat skills; Supernatural strength; Supernatural speed and reflexes; Supernatural agility; Supernatural stamina; Supernatural durability; Supernatural healing
- Leader: Watchers' Council

A Slayer in the television series Buffy the Vampire Slayer and Angel (both created by Joss Whedon), is a young woman bestowed by fate with supernatural powers and abilities that originate from the heart, soul, and spirit of a pure-demon.

The opening narration in the Buffy series states "In every generation there is a chosen one. She alone will stand against the vampires, the demons, and the forces of darkness. She is the Slayer."

While they are commonly referred to as "Vampire Slayers" within the series, even by Watchers and vampires themselves, The Slayer operates as a defender of humanity against all supernatural threats.

The reputation of the Slayer is well-known and revered even throughout other dimensions. The notion of the Slayer has been compared to the equivalent of a Demonic "Boogey-Man", feared and considered by most to be essentially unconquerable.

== Reception and analysis ==
Rhonda Wilcox explains that the First Slayer was violated by the Shadow Men. She contrasts this with Buffy's offer of choice to the potentials. Wilcox notes that despite the message of sharing power around the world, not all women are made slayers. She then equates being a slayer with being a leader. Patricia Pender discusses the potentials and sharing of power as well, noting the cultural aspects and providing a critique of the cultural portrayals.

Pender also analyzes the reception of Buffy as the slayer in early criticism of the show: "the Slayer is celebrated at the expense of the girl, and the composite character is found inexplicably wanting," going on to explain this is a flaw in analysis of the character. Pender goes on to discuss the "struggle to balance the demands of her supernatural duties as the Slayer and her desire to live what she sees as a normal teenage life. As several critics have pointed out, this struggle literalises the challenges many, if not all, adolescents experience when negotiating their entry into the adult world".

Cynthia Fuchs similarly says Buffy's character brought an understanding of teenage life, but that her "'secret identity' as the slayer exacerbates such ordeals and dreams. She explains further, when analyzing a sequence with the First Slayer, "Buffy's perpetual sense of displacement, her sense that she belongs to another "race", apart from her world (which is populated by humans, demons, and vampires, communities into which she never quite fits), is made concrete for her in the First Slayer.

== The Chosen One ==
"In every generation there is a Chosen One. She alone will stand against the vampires, the demons, and the forces of darkness. She is the Slayer."

— The opening narration and Giles in seasons 1 and 2 of Buffy the Vampire Slayer

=== The First Slayer ===
Thousands of years ago in prehistoric Africa, after the rise of vampires, a group of tribal elders known as the Shadow Men used powerful magic to infuse a captive girl with the heart, soul and spirit of a pure demon known as the Shadow Demon. This process granted the girl great strength, speed, agility, reflexes, healing, endurance and psychic abilities, though it cost her her sanity and connection to humanity. She became The First Slayer: chosen to destroy the demons that plagued the Earth. The Shadow Men's descendants went on to form the Watchers' Council, an organization dedicated to finding, training, and supporting Slayers.

=== The Slayer line ===
Due to the violent nature of the life of a Slayer, their average lifespan is quite short after being called. Consequently, the Shadow Men's spell also created a large number of Potential Slayers—normal girls around the world who may one day be called. When a Slayer dies, one of the Potentials—seemingly chosen at random—gains the powers and abilities of a Slayer. The Watcher's Council tries to identify and train these "Potentials" before they are called, locating some as babies, but are not always able to do so, with some girls only being found after they have been activated as the Slayer. Since then, people reportedly witnessing young women stopping a series of strange grisly murders, including one in the Port of Boston in 1845 and another, in the Oklahoma Territory in 1893.

This process continues through the generations until 1997, when one Slayer—Buffy Summers—is killed in battle (by drowning) only to be revived via CPR. Buffy retains her Slayer powers, but her clinical death is enough for the next Slayer to be called. For the next year there are two Slayers in the world: first Kendra, who was called on Buffy's death, and then Faith, who was called when Kendra was killed by Drusilla.

The mystical "rules" governing the Calling of Slayers change again in 2003, when Buffy discovers a Scythe forged for the Slayer to wield. Willow Rosenberg uses magic to tap into the Scythe's essence at Buffy's request, and performs a spell that calls every living Potential Slayer at once, thus ending the legacy of "one girl in all the world".

After taking the time to find and count them, Buffy states that there are at least 1800 Slayers in the world, 500 of whom are working with the Scooby Gang. Potentials now awaken as Slayers when they reach suitable maturation; for instance, the Slayer Soledad was awakened on her sixteenth birthday.

At the end of Season Eight, Buffy destroys the Seed of Wonder, affecting the magical world; while all active Slayers present on Earth remain, no new Slayers can be called.

At some point in the 21st century, a Slayer faces an army of demons. As a result of this battle, all demons and magicks are banished from Earth's dimension. At this point, the Slayer line becomes dormant—while Potential Slayers still exist, none are called for two hundred years.

In the far future, demons eventually find a way to return to Earth's dimension, and the next Slayer is finally called—a girl named Melaka Fray.

=== Powers and abilities ===
The powers that are bestowed upon the Slayer are mostly physical enhancements that vary in degree from Slayer to Slayer.

==== Strength ====
Slayers are endowed with strength far greater than that of regular humans, some demons and the vast majority of vampires. Buffy Summers, for instance, has been shown to lift, with great effort, a metal portcullis which an entire group of people were unable to budge. She is also capable of bending a steel rifle barrel with little apparent effort and easily bending open the bars of prison cells with her bare hands. Buffy has been recorded throwing human-sized subjects sizable distances and casually lifting steel girders used in construction building

During a fight, Faith Lehane is able to pick up the vampire Angel with one hand and easily throw him across a room, then lift him over her head and slam him into the ceiling. Once, while fighting Buffy, she punched her fist into a wall. She is also seen picking up a barbell with one hand and hitting a woman in the face with it. Genevieve Savidge once slapped a fellow Slayer so hard that her neck snapped in a fit of rage. Since Slayers can take blows from superhuman beings with little to no injury, this indicates the high-end feats of Slayer strength can go above and beyond what one would expect.

One example of a Slayer being stronger than most vampires is in "The Gift", when Buffy easily lifts Olaf's hammer with one hand when Spike was barely able to do so with both hands in "Blood Ties", and when she defeats the demon Doc easily when Spike is unable to. Angel also remarked in "Sanctuary" that Buffy is "a little bit stronger" than he is, though the humorous tenor of the exchange suggests he may have been understating the difference.

The Slayer's strength appears to be largely metaphysical, as it does not seem to add to their body mass and they remain buoyant enough to swim.

Melaka Fray is able to pick up an overweight vampire several times her own size and body mass, lift him up over her head with both hands and throw him over a distance of presumably over 20–25 feet, with no downward arc to his trajectory (which was only interrupted due to his hitting a metal grate, which was extensively deformed on impact).

The psychotic Slayer Dana is able to, through several violent shoves, knock down a metal door as well as deform the edges of a metal gate as she tore it from its hinges.

Buffy and Angel often shows inconsistencies in their characters' physical strength; for example, Buffy was struggled a lot to bust open a metal door in "I, Robot... You, Jane" (although she was weakened by poisonous gas), but casually breaks down metal doors in both "The Harvest" and "End of Days". Buffy has also been successfully bound by rope or chains on some occasions but she also easily broke free from ropes and chains with raw strength on different occasions. This has been acknowledged frequently in commentaries and interviews by writers and creators of the shows. However, it is stated by Riley that Buffy gets stronger "every day" and is inferred that she may be stronger due to the fact that she has been activated the longest. Her momentarily inability to break through ropes or chains is usually also explained by Buffy being weakened by drugs or other means before being tied up then snapping the chains or other restraints once her full strength returns.

==== Agility and reflexes ====
Slayers are able to move faster and react more quickly than normal human beings. Buffy has been shown snatching a crossbow bolt in mid-flight, dodging gunfire from multiple ranges and setting off a bear trap, but not getting caught in it. At one point Buffy was fast enough to outrun a raiding motorcyclist on his bike shortly after her resurrection. Faith has been shown to dodge shotgun blasts at point-blank range and Dana was able to dodge a tranquilizer dart also fired at point-blank range. A Slayer is capable of superhuman feats of agility. She can leap to great heights; though the maximum is unknown, Buffy was shown to be capable of reaching the roof of the original Sunnydale High in a very short period of time, after running up a sloping wall then flipping onto the roof.

==== Resilience and healing ====
A Slayer's body is substantially more durable and resistant to blunt force trauma than an ordinary human's and there is evidence of an incredibly high pain tolerance. It is difficult, though not impossible, to bruise them, break their bones or strain their joints. Buffy has suffered from a sprained arm as a consequence of fighting vampires. Melaka Fray is hit with a steel girder thrown at her from a demon and recovers within minutes; she is also shown to fall from a height of over five stories to land face-first on a cement sidewalk and be only dazed before fully recovering in moments, and at a later time, to fall four stories down, crash through the cement roof of an adjacent building and fall down the height of one more story, and recover instantly. Buffy can leap from a window with a man in her arms, landing on the ground and letting her body take the brunt of the fall. Buffy has been hit by a moving truck, got up and run off. Faith has fallen from a height of three stories on top of a closed dumpster, rolled off it to hit the ground and got up immediately with no signs of damage; she also was able to hold her own in a fight with Buffy less than 24 hours after waking from a nine-month coma—a coma which she entered after surviving a deep stab wound to the abdomen immediately followed by a fall from the top of a multi-story building into a moving truck. Also, in an attempt from the Watcher's Council to capture Faith without killing her in "Sanctuary", they prepare a tranquilizer that is capable of knocking out a man twice her size, which is more than enough to subdue an ordinary young woman her size.

Despite these feats, the Slayer is far from invulnerable. For instance, Buffy has been knocked out by blunt force trauma, such as being hit over the head with a lead pipe by a possessed Cordelia Chase in "Bad Eggs" and with a detached mannequin arm by Ethan Rayne in "The Dark Age", and was also rendered unconscious when Drusilla jolted her with a cattle prod in "Crush". In addition, the Slayer can be injured by conventional bullets, bladed weapons, and more advanced weaponry (such as the energy weapons commonly used by the Initiative) just as easily as an ordinary human can, but they can recover from even very severe injuries in remarkably short periods of time. Usually, Buffy is completely healed within 24 hours of being injured, though more serious injuries have been shown to take at least a few days, and Slayers can receive scars. Buffy has survived contact with a live electrical wire; the normally lethal jolt simply renders her unconscious and melts her shoe soles.

The Slayer also appears to have a heightened immune system: Buffy is depicted as almost never getting sick, aside from contracting the flu during a period of great emotional stress.

==== Senses ====
Slayers possess a heightened awareness of their surroundings. This heightened awareness can, with experience, allow the Slayer to know the position of an attacker and fight them blindfolded or in the dark. This is not a constant ability, however. This skill must be honed through practice and the Slayer usually must focus to achieve the full benefit, as shown in season 5 "Family", during which, when Tara casts a spell that causes demons to be invisible to the gang, Buffy orders everyone to be quiet and fights a demon without seeing it.

A Slayer also has the limited ability to detect the presence of vampires (and presumably other demons). This power must be honed as with the heightened awareness, and the Slayer must focus to achieve the full effect. This does not prevent Buffy (and other Slayers) from being ambushed by vampires. Buffy could be unusually deficient in this sense: Although she initially distrusts Angel when first meeting him and seems to sense that he is following her for a period of time, she doesn't realize until he shows her his vampiric face for the first time that he is a vampire. However, her ability might have been compromised by the presence of Angel's soul. Additionally, in "Dirty Girls," Faith attacks Spike under the impression that he is chasing an innocent girl and is unaware that he was in fact pursuing a vampire until said vampire attacks her from behind.

In the 1992 film, the ability to detect vampires manifested itself in the form of feminine cramps. (Merrick describes this as a "natural reaction to their unnatural presence".) This ability was inconsistent, as Buffy was unaware that a vampire was hiding in a photo booth right next to her. The movie, however, is not considered canon, and this aspect of her powers was not carried over to the series.

==== Dreams ====
All Slayers through the ages share a psychic link, manifested in dreams. A Slayer will frequently dream of herself as a Slayer in another time and place. These dreams are usually vague, but can also be prophetic. Dreams exist in their own mystic plane or "dreamscape" where for a Slayer, precognitive sense and the inherited memories of other Slayers can manifest themselves. Also, Slayers have been shown to appear in each other's dreams, and Buffy and Faith shared several dreams while Faith was in a coma. Faith provided the first cryptic reference to Dawn Summers' arrival.

Melaka Fray, the Slayer of the far future, lacks these abilities. Due to the unusual nature of their birth, her twin brother received these visions instead.

==== Other abilities ====
While a regular person may require eight to ten hours sleep, a Slayer seems to require considerably less but needs some rest to function. Buffy herself has been seen as staying awake for days although she will usually "crash" and sleep for half a day and show no lingering disabilities. A Slayer naturally has formidable fighting skills. Buffy is shown to easily fend off multiple vampires at the same time while under a memory loss spell, with no memory of her combat training—relying entirely on her natural Slayer instincts, presumably indicating an instinctual grasp of fighting. Dana is seen holding her own against Spike without having any previous combat training. It is also shown that Potential Slayers have innate skills in combat, even before being called, as Amanda was able to defeat a vampire without any previous combat training in "Potential". The Slayer's Watcher trains her to hone these talents, and to teach her specific fighting skills, such as various martial arts. The training helps her to battle the occasional demon whose physical strength outclasses her own. For most situations, however, her strength suffices. To test a Slayer's natural ingenuity and practical capability, the Watcher's Council administers a test known as "the Cruciamentum" if/when they turn eighteen, which strips the Slayer of her powers and forces her to fight a powerful vampire without them ("Helpless"). The compound used to weaken the Slayer makes her typically weaker than most normal humans. This renders a Slayer who would still normally be physically fit without her powers remarkably feeble even for a human. This forces the Slayer to rely solely on her intellect and wit, which Buffy proves to have. She killed an insane vampire called Kralik by using his weakest point against him—his medication (without which he suffers extraordinary pain). When he rushes to take his pills, he searches for a glass of water. After drinking it, he realizes that Buffy had filled the glass with Holy Water.

There is some evidence to indicate that The Slayer might possess some supernatural influence or presence over others. Part of the role of the Slayer is being a leader and deciding the appropriate course of action to be taken. In the course of the entire timeline, The Slayer has always instantly been acknowledged as the leader and the final decision maker, superseding even that of the Watchers. This is touched on in the episode "Chosen", with Faith and Buffy hypothesizing that one of the major reasons they don't get along is that there should only be one. This could also be the major reason why Slayers went rogue and constantly struggled for sole leadership of the Slayer Army in Season Eight and the Potential Slayers kept questioning both Faith and Buffy's judgement in Season Seven. Further evidence of this phenomenon is found with Melaka Fray, the Slayer of the future, and her vampire brother. She possesses all the strength and physical abilities, but everyone dismisses her and no one takes her seriously, though her brother, who possesses all of her non-physical abilities, was instantly accepted as a leader among his peers, despite him being newly sired and inexperienced.

Overall, the Slayer's abilities seem to be enhancements of normal human attributes, rather than extra abilities garnered from a magical source; Buffy trains constantly and works out to enhance and maintain her abilities, suggesting that they would atrophy otherwise. A "normal" workout routine that would enhance a regular human's strength and speed increases her abilities much faster and at greater magnitude. Also, the concoction created in the Season Three episode "Helpless" (which Giles says includes muscle relaxants and adrenal inhibitors) would have the same effects on a normal human as they did on Buffy; the effects are simply more pronounced. Also, regular illnesses such as the flu were shown to have effects on the Slayer not greatly different from its effects on humans; once again the handicap is more noticeable given the Slayer's usually enhanced abilities, though it was nonetheless proven to be enough that it nearly cost Buffy her life while fighting Angelus.

Recently in Season Eight, Buffy has gained a multitude of new powers: her strength, speed, agility, and reflexes have been greatly enhanced, and she has also developed telescopic vision, superhuman hearing, flight, and a level of invulnerability. Willow initially theorizes that these powers are a result of Buffy unwittingly absorbing the collective powers of all of the Slayers who have died since their organization began, but Angel later claims that they are in fact a reward because of the fulfillment of her destiny and involvement with the coming of a new reality.

=== Weapons and equipment ===
Slayers typically use weapons to fight vampires and other demons. Simple wooden stakes, crucifixes, and holy water are commonly used due to their effectiveness against vampires. Swords, axes, and knives are the most common implements used for dispatching demons, though other melee weapons (generally of medieval European design) are also used. Ranged weaponry is usually confined to crossbows. On occasion, more sophisticated weaponry is used; Buffy Summers has used a military-issue rocket launcher to defeat a particularly tough demon. The Slayer Melaka Fray uses weaponry native to her time period, such as rayguns, as well as traditional Slayer weapons. Buffy has a personal dislike for firearms, and has made it a rule that no Slayer in her group use them. On the other hand, the rogue Slayer Simone Doffler and her criminal gang are enamoured of guns.

==== Scythe ====
The Scythe is a weapon resembling a metal lochaber axe with a wooden stake and a flanged mace head built into the handle. Due to its design, the Scythe can be used as an axe, sword or spear, depending on the fighting style of its wielder. The Scythe exhibits some mystical properties. A Slayer who picks it up recognizes it as a source of power, and has an instinctive sense of ownership of the weapon. When Buffy showed the Scythe to Faith, she said that she "felt like it belongs to me", but immediately surrenders it to Buffy, saying that it was hers because she was a Slayer first. When Buffy discovers the weapon, she tracks its lineage to a mysterious woman who explains its origin. Centuries ago, a group of women known as the Guardians forged the Scythe for the Slayer. The Guardians kept the weapon a secret from the Shadow Men, and later the Watchers. The Scythe was used to kill the last pure demon on Earth in what would later become Sunnydale, California. It was lost after that, until discovered by Buffy embedded in stone. Willow Rosenberg is soon after able to harness the Scythe's mystical essence and activate every Potential Slayer in the world.

The Scythe is seen 200 years later in the hands of the demon Urkonn, who passes the weapon on to Melaka Fray. Melaka Fray did not seem to sense anything in particular upon wielding the Scythe for the first time, likely because she is cut off from the slayer's psychic abilities. It is during Fray's time as Slayer that the Scythe was destroyed; during a confrontation with a time-displaced Buffy Summers, the latter smashed it clean in two with a backhanded punch.

==== Slayer Emergency Kit ====
The "emergency kit" is a bag found in the possession of Robin Wood. It was given to him by his mother Nikki Wood. When he gave it to Buffy, he claimed that it was a "Slayer heirloom" that should have been passed down to the next Slayer, but he kept it instead, presumably because he did not have much by which to remember her. It is unknown how long this had been passed down, and has not been mentioned by any other Slayers, but it is assumed to be quite old considering its contents. At the time Buffy received it, it was in a brown leather bag, and contained several objects, including a boomerang, a vase, a locked box containing shadow casters, and a mystical book written in Sumerian.

The shadow casters are placed onto the smaller circular metal piece in front of a light, creating shadow images on the wall, and the book is then read to tell the story. The book will then translate itself, possibly into English, or perhaps into whatever the reader's language might be. The shadows cast by the metal figures will then become enchanted themselves and begin to move on their own, recreating the story of the First Slayer. A portal is then created, allowing the Slayer to speak directly to the Shadow Men that created the First Slayer, but "exchanging" the Slayer for a particularly powerful demon, releasing the demon onto Earth through the same portal. The Slayer can then gain more power through the Shadow Men if she is willing, but only through taking in more of the essence of the demon which gave the Slayer her powers in the first place. The only apparent way to bring the Slayer back to Earth is to bring the released demon back to the site of the portal.

The text translated from the book is as follows. "First there is the Earth. Then, there came the Demons. After Demons, there came men. Men found a girl. And the men took the girl to slay demons. They chained her to the Earth. Filled her with Dark. You cannot be shown. You cannot just watch, but you must see. See for yourself, but only if you're willing to make the exchange. This is the only way. There is no..." The page then ends, and it's unknown what comes next.

== See also ==
- Tales of the Slayer
- Tales of the Slayers
- Woman warrior
- List of women warriors in folklore
- Vampire hunter
