= Ann Hearn =

American actress, director (born 1953)

- Born: Ann Neel Simons; June 27, 1953 (age 73); Griffin, Georgia
- Education: University of Georgia
- Occupations: Actress and Stage director
- Years active: 1982–present
- Spouse: Stephen Tobolowsky (m. 1988)
- Children: 2
- Website: Ann Hearn Tobolowsky

Ann Hearn (born Ann Neel Simons; June 27, 1953) is an American actress and stage director. She is married to fellow character actor Stephen Tobolowsky. Her most prominent roles were in The Accused (1988) and Lorenzo's Oil (1992). As of 2020 when the COVID-19 pandemic started, she turned her attention from acting to stage directing, on the experimental play Reykjavik by award-winning writer Steve Yockey.

== Biography ==
The daughter of Elizabeth Ann Neel and William "Bill" Simons, Ann was born in Griffin, Georgia. She attended the University of Georgia, Athens, studying English and history, and then received her master of fine arts in 1979.

== Personal life ==
Hearn is married to actor Stephen Tobolowsky, with whom she has two sons.

== Career ==
She worked as an actor in a variety of roles in film and television, most notably in the films The Accused (1988) and Lorenzo's Oil (1992). Once the pandemic started in 2020, she turned her attention to what could be done remotely, with writing and directing.

== Filmography ==
=== Film ===
Year	Title	Role	Notes
1982	Time Walker	Coed #4	
1986	Nobody's Fool	Linda	
1988	Two Idiots in Hollywood	Morris Franklin / Girl in Ed. Room	
1988	The Accused	Sally Fraser	
1990	Mirror, Mirror	Mrs. Perlili	
1991	Dutch	Riva Malloy	
1992	Lorenzo's Oil	Loretta Muscatine	
1993	Born Yesterday	Mrs. Banks	
1993	Josh and S.A.M.	Teacher	
1994	My Father the Hero	Stella	
1996	The War at Home	Prof. Tracey	
1996	Sticks & Stones	Mouth's Mom	
2003	Frankie and Johnny Are Married	Constance	
2004	Debating Robert Lee	Mrs. Russell	
2005	Stephen Tobolowsky's Birthday Party	—N/a	
2018	Strange Nature	Receptionist	
unfinished	Eight Types of Crazy	Florence Bell	some footage in 2017

=== Television ===
Year	Title	Role	Notes
1984	The Dollmaker	Max	TV movie
1985	St. Elsewhere	Andrea Fordham	4 episodes
1986	Cagney & Lacey	Iris Redfern	Episode: "Exit Stage Center"
1987	Deadly Care	Suze	TV movie
1987	Moonlighting	Margaret Kendall	Episode: "To Heiress Human"
1988	Why on Earth?	Lily	TV movie
1989	The Final Days	Julie Nixon Eisenhower	TV movie
1989	Designing Women	Amy Betz	Episode: "Julia Gets Her Head Stuck in a Fence"
1990	A Different World	Manager	Episode: "Pride and Prejudice"
1990	His & Hers	Nora	Episode: "My Boyfriend's Back and There's Gonna Be Trouble"
1990–1993	Evening Shade	Margaret Fouch	Recurring role
1991	Omen IV: The Awakening	Jo Thueson	TV movie
1993	Jack's Place	Amanda	Episode: "Watch Me Pull a Dream Out of My Hat"
1994, 1995	Murder, She Wrote	Peggy Evans / Connie Anderson	2 episodes
1995	A Woman of Independent Means	Lydia	3 episodes
1996	The Client	Helen Denton	Episode: "The High Ground"
1997	ER	Shelly Dunleavy	Episode: "Night Shift"
1997	Crisis Center	Emily	Episode: "It's a Family Affair"
1999	Judging Amy	Paula Mitchell	Episode: "Last Tango in Hartford"
2007	Days of Our Lives	Mrs. Granger	Episode #1.10580
2008	Numbers	Kevin's Mother	Episode: "Jack of All Trades"
2010	Big Love	—N/a	Episode: "Blood Atonement"
2014	Rizzoli & Isles	Chelsea Rothsburgher	Episode: "The Best Laid Plans"
2015	You'll Be Fine	Shannon Smothers	Episode: "We've Been Waiting"
2018	Strange Angel	Exasperated Woman	Episode: "Ritual of the Rival Tribes"
