= David Lancaster (filmmaker) =

American film producer

- Occupations: Film producer; television producer
- Years active: 1985–present

David Lancaster is an American film and television producer and the CEO of the production company Rumble Films. His work as a producer for the 2014 film Whiplash earned him a nomination for Best Picture at the 87th Academy Awards.

== Life and career ==
Lancaster began his career as a film producer in 1985 for the television film The Laundromat. His first feature film was Two Idiots in Hollywood (1988), which was directed by Stephen Tobolowsky. More films and television films as producer and executive producer followed, with Lancaster eventually becoming co-president of the production company Bold Films in 2006.

In 2014, he resigned his position at Bold Films to launch his own film company, Rumble Films. His work on the 2014 film Whiplash earned him and fellow producers Jason Blum and Helen Estabrook a nomination for Best Picture at the 87th Academy Awards.

== Filmography ==
=== Film ===
| Year | Title | Director | Notes |
|---|---|---|---|
| 1988 | Two Idiots in Hollywood | Stephen Tobolowsky | |
| 1993 | Quick | Rick King | |
| 1996 | Terminal Justice | Rick King | |
| 1996 | Persons Unknown | George Hickenlooper | |
| 1998 | The Sadness of Sex | Rupert Wainwright | |
| 1999 | Loving Jezebel | Kwyn Bader | |
| 2000 | Second Skin | Darrell James Roodt | |
| 2002 | Lone Hero | Ken Sanzel | |
| 2003 | Consequence | Anthony Hickox | |
| 2004 | A Love Song for Bobby Long | Shainee Gabel | |
| 2004 | Blast | Anthony Hickox | |
| 2004 | Riding the Bullet | Mick Garris | |
| 2005 | Slipstream | David van Eyssen | |
| 2006 | Hollow Man 2 | Claudio Fäh | |
| 2006 | The Breed | Nicholas Mastandrea | |
| 2008 | Middle of Nowhere | John Stockwell | |
| 2008 | Starship Troopers 3: Marauder | Edward Neumeier | |
| 2009 | The Hole | Joe Dante | |
| 2010 | Legion | Scott Stewart | |
| 2013 | Evidence | Olatunde Osunsanmi | |
| 2013 | Heatstroke | Evelyn Maude Purcell | |
| 2014 | Lost River | Ryan Gosling | |
| 2014 | Nightcrawler | Dan Gilroy | |
| 2014 | Whiplash | Damien Chazelle | Academy Award nomination for Best Picture |
| 2015 | No Escape | John Erick Dowdle | |
| 2015 | Eye in the Sky | Gavin Hood | |
| 2016 | Message from the King | Fabrice Du Welz | |
| 2017 | Small Crimes | E. L. Katz | |
| 2018 | Donnybrook | Tim Sutton | |
| 2019 | The Other Lamb | Małgorzata Szumowska | |
| 2019 | The Burnt Orange Heresy | Giuseppe Capotondi | |
| 2019 | Semper Fi | Henry Alex Rubin | |

=== Television ===
| Year | Title | Notes |
|---|---|---|
| 1985 | The Laundromat | Television film |
| 1993 | Scam | Television film |
| 1996 | Woman Undone | Television film |
| 1999 | The Last Witness | Television film |
| 2002 | Borderline | Television film |
| 2002 | Pavement | Television film |
| 2002 | Federal Protection | Television film |
| 2004 | Dracula 3000 | Television film |
