= Matt Roth =

Matt Roth may refer to:

- Matt Roth (American football) (born 1982), American football player
- Matt Roth (actor) (born 1964), American actor
