= Lisa Chess =

American actress

- Born: United States
- Occupation: Actress
- Spouse: Michael Pressman

Lisa Chess is a film, television and theatre actress.

== Career ==
Chess is perhaps best known for her recurring role on the American television series Picket Fences and such films as Star Trek: The Motion Picture and The Hollow. Her first credited movie role was in 1979 as a party guest in 10. Chess also played the role of "Audience Woman" during the 'Ninja Rap' scene in Teenage Mutant Ninja Turtles 2: The Secret of the Ooze, where she was held hostage by The Shredder and threatened with mutation by the titular 'ooze' in Shredder's possession.
