= Frankie and Johnny Are Married =

- Directed by: Michael Pressman
- Written by: Michael Pressman
- Produced by: Alice West
- Starring: Michael Pressman; Lisa Chess; Alan Rosenberg; Stephen Tobolowsky; Jillian Armenante
- Cinematography: Jacek Laskus
- Edited by: Jeff Freeman; Michael Rafferty
- Music by: Don Peake
- Distributed by: IFC Films (Theatrical); Screen Media Films (Home media)
- Release date: November 8, 2003
- Running time: 95 minutes
- Country: United States
- Language: English
- Box office: $22,900

Frankie and Johnny Are Married is a 2003 American comedy film written and directed by Michael Pressman, starring Pressman, Lisa Chess and Alan Rosenberg. The film chronicles the troubles a producer has trying to mount a production of the Terrence McNally play Frankie and Johnny in the Clair de Lune. The production is beset by one problem after another, including a hard to handle male lead (Rosenberg). This eventually results in Pressman taking on the male lead role himself.

== Cast ==
- Michael Pressman as Michael Pressman
- Lisa Chess as Lisa Chess
- Alan Rosenberg as Alan Rosenberg
- Stephen Tobolowsky as Murray Mintz
- Jillian Armenante as Cynthia
- Morgan Nagler as Sally
- Maury Sterling as Roger
- Hector Elizondo as Hector Elizondo
- Jerry Levine as Jerry Levine
- Alice West as Alice West
- Jeffrey Passero as Jeffrey Passero
- Mandy Patinkin as Mandy Patinkin
- Brooks Pressman as Brooks Pressman
- David E. Kelley as David E. Kelley
- Les Moonves as Les Moonves
- Nina Tassler as Nina Tassler
- Barry Primus as Barry Primus
- Kathy Baker as Kathy Baker
- Steven Glick as Steven Glick
- Lou Antonio as Lou Antonio
