= Peace Out =

- Angel episode
- Episode no.: Season 4 Episode 21
- Directed by: Jefferson Kibbee
- Written by: David Fury
- Production code: 4ADH21
- Original air date: April 30, 2003

Guest appearances
- Gina Torres as Jasmine; Stephanie Romanov as Lilah Morgan; Robert Towers as High Priest; Bonita Friedericy as Patience; Eliza Pryor Nagel as Susan; Bob Pescovitz as News Producer; Gerry Katzman as Technician; Audrey Kearns as Young Woman; Kristin Richardson as Female Reporter; Kyle Ingleman as Jeremy; Jeff Scott Bass as Brent; Kimble Jemison as Cop #1; Blair Hickey as Male News Reporter; Angelica Castro as Telemundo Reporter; Brian Bradley as Grizzled Reporter

Episode chronology
← Previous "Sacrifice"	Next → "Home"
- Angel season 4

"Peace Out" is the 21st episode of the fourth season of the American television series Angel.

== Plot synopsis ==
The gang, minus Angel, are fighting Connor and his band of Jasminites in the mantis demons lair. Angel and the blue orb are in the demon world, where he has spotted a bridge to a city that holds a temple. Connor takes Wesley, Fred, Gunn, and Lorne captive announcing that he has to kill them. He says that the heroes are all alone and do not belong there. Gunn is happy not to belong since everyone else is worshipping a false god. Before Connor can kill anyone, a guard speaks in Jasmine's voice and tells him to bring the others back to the Hyperion. As Angel climbs a cliff to the temple, Jasmine thanks some of the Jasminites for being loyal followers. Connor brings in the gang and Jasmine tells them that they've caused themselves pain by abandoning her. She asks where Angel is and Wesley taunts her, saying she should know since she is omniscient. Wesley asks about the mantis demon he met in the previous episode and she compares this past world to the humans’ world. She says that when she came along, she “kicked their evolution up a few ticks,” but it obviously did not work out (also that she has a better chance in this world as it can be taken over quickly, as mass communications speed the spread of her message). She adds that Angel is wasting his time in the demon world, but Wesley says that if she really believed that, she would have killed them already. Jasmine tells a follower to tell the media that she will be down soon; Wesley realizes that she is about to beam out her “love” to everyone. Fred tries to get Connor to stop her, telling him that Jasmine will enslave everyone, but he says that she will bring everyone together. Fred says that they tried to show him what Jasmine really is; he tells her that he knows. He looks at Jasmine, and Connor sees what they have been seeing - her maggot-infested flesh. “She’s beautiful,” Connor says. Jasmine heads for her press interview, telling Connor that she will not be able to keep an eye on everyone while it is going on, so he will have to do that for her. Connor asks what Angel has gone after and Jasmine replies, “The unattainable.”

Angel reaches to the temple, where he encounters the high priest; a short, bipedal being. The priest says that Angel has come this far only to die. He calls himself “guardian of the word, caretaker of her most blessed temple” and Angel notes that there do not seem to be any other followers. The high priest is sure that Jasmine will return when she is finished with the human world. Angel tries to get the priest to say Jasmine's real name, but the priest will not say it. Angel tries to intimidate him and the priest tells him, “You can take away her power, but you’ve already lost…everything.”

Connor imprisons Wesley and company in Angelus’ cage in the basement and Wesley notes that the blood ritual did not work on Connor because he has seen Jasmine's true face all along. Connor says that appearance does not matter to him, since he grew up in Quor-toth. Fred tries to get Connor to feel badly about Cordelia; Connor tells her that Cordelia has been moved. Wesley asks Connor what Jasmine eats, since the demon called her “the devourer.” Connor denies that he knows, but Wesley has already figured out that she eats her followers. Gunn worries that Cordelia has already been eaten.

Angel demands that the priest give him Jasmine's true name, but the priest reveals that he cannot; only the Keeper of the name has it. The priest is the guardian of the word, but the guardian of the word is not the keeper of the name. The word is the name, so the priest is the guardian of the Keeper - the keeper of the Keeper. The Keeper happens to be in the corner of the room, but the priest warns that he will only speak Jasmine's real name with his last breath: the Keeper's mouth is sewn shut.

Connor heads to the banquet hall, where Jasmine is chatting with some of her followers who have no idea that they're about to be eaten. He pulls her aside and asks where she took Cordelia. Jasmine assures him that she did not eat Cordelia; Connor tries to pretend that he didn ot think that, but he is relieved. However, Jasmine will not tell him where she took Cordelia.

Angel fights the Keeper as the priest taunts him that his friends are probably dead by now, so there is no reason for Angel to try to fight for his world. The priest points out that his world does not care about him or want him, but Angel counters that it needs him. The priest says that he is actually fighting for Connor. He is going to lose his son.

The press sets up for the conference, excited to share Jasmine with the rest of the world. Connor finds a couple of followers who moved Cordelia and demands to know where she is. Back at the temple, the priest wonders why Angel keeps trying to make things right with Connor. The priest points out that Connor was only brought about to bring Jasmine into the world. “He will never love you,” the priest taunts. Angel says that it does not matter. He ducks a swing from the Keeper and the priest gets knocked into a wall instead. In the basement of the Hyperion, Gunn is kicking the cage to try to break out of it, but he is mostly just succeeding at annoying Lorne. Fred notes that Connor left them unguarded. Wesley wonders why Jasmine had Cordelia moved since the gang were the only people using her blood to turn others. He asks why Jasmine does not just kill Cordelia. Fred thinks that she canno and Wesley agrees that Jasmine is dependent on Cordelia - she cannot hurt her without hurting herself. However, Cordelia might be able to hurt Jasmine. The gang decide that they should figure out how to wake up Cordelia, though first, they will have to find her.

Connor finds a church (with a sign reading, “God is nowhere. Jasmine is the way”) and tries to get past the police officers outside. Connor knocks the cops out and goes into the church, where he finds the comatose Cordelia. While Jasmine eats a large group of people and prepares for her press conference, Connor gives an impassioned speech to Cordelia about needing a reason to fight. He says that he does not have one now and wants to just stop. He admits that he never believed in Jasmine but went along because everyone else did and he wanted to belong. She is bringing peace to everyone and helping them get rid of their hatred, but it is not working for him. He says that his whole life has been built on lies, but at least this one was better than the other ones.

In the lobby of the Hyperion, the media prepares for the press conference. Upstairs, one of the men Connor attacked for info on Cordelia alerts Jasmine. Jasmine heads to the press conference and starts talking about love, her image broadcast around the world. From the basement, Wesley and company hear the audience cheering and realize that Jasmine has started her world broadcast. They realize that they really are alone now. Back at the conference, Jasmine tells everyone that they do not have to give her anything, just show her love and maybe a large temple to stand as a beacon of hope.

As Angel suddenly appears during her speech she orders her followers to attack him. They do but Angel cuts the sewn mouth of the Keeper and a long hissing sound is heard. With her name revealed, Jasmine glows and screams are heard as her face switches between her beauty and true form until it settles in the middle. Now with purple eyes and covered in boils, Jasmine begs her followers to calm down as they erupt into chaos and despair. Convinced that something has gone terribly wrong, Gunn kicks open the door to the cage and they head upstairs. Out in the streets of L.A., everything is chaotic and Jasmine is upset that no one is worshipping her any longer. She contacts Connor through one of the police at the church; Connor runs off to find her. Angel catches up to Jasmine and tells her that she lost. She replies, “There are no absolutes. No right and wrong. Haven’t you learned anything working for the Powers? There are only choices. I offered paradise. You chose this!” He counters that he chose this world because he could; she had taken the choice away from everyone. “And look what free will has gotten you,” Jasmine says. Angel responds that free will is what makes humans human; Jasmine points out that he is not human. “Working on it,” he says. She heads off, wanting to be alone, and Angel says that he is not going to let her hurt anyone else. He lists the things she has done, pointing out that thousands of people are dead because of her. Jasmine asks how many people will die because Angel stopped world peace. She argues that she murdered thousands in order to save billions, but now the world has to fend for itself. “The price was too high, Jasmine,” Angel says. “Our fate has to be our own, or we’re nothing.” He tells her that everyone has done horrible stuff, but they can make up for it; she does not have the world she wanted, but she can still try to make it better. Jasmine does not want to. She punches Angel off a bridge and uses a car as a weapon. She tells him that she loved the world and sacrificed everything to be there. Angel counters that she did so in order to run the world. Jasmine says that the other Powers That Be did not care the way she did and he knows it.

The fighting continues and Jasmine reminds Angel of the prophecy that said he would play a role in the apocalypse. He never knew which side he would be on, but now he does - she is going to wipe out the human race with the last of her energy, and the blood will be on his hands. He tells her to go to hell; she replies, “You first, baby,” and then kisses him. Connor arrives, noting that once again Angel is involved with a girl who was Connor's first. Jasmine is thrilled that Connor is finally there.

Wesley, Gunn and Fred search the hotel but find that everyone has left. Lorne notes that all of the TV stations are off the air, which means that something big happened. Wesley realizes that Angel came back and that they need to find him and Cordelia before Jasmine does. Before the gang can get out the door, they are met by something surprising. On the bridge, Jasmine tells Connor that Angel cannot defeat both of them. “You still believe in me, don’t you?” she asks. “You still love me?” “Yes,” Connor replies, before punching her through her maggoty head and killing her. Angel tries to comfort Connor, but he runs off. Angel heads back to the Hyperion, where he is shocked to see that the others are still alive. He tells them that Jasmine is dead and Connor killed her. As Wesley tries to interrupt and tell him something, Angel says that he has never seen Connor like that before. “I think he’s gonna do something,” Angel says. “You know, he might--.” “End world peace?” a woman replies. Angel looks over to see Lilah in the office doorway. “Well, you already took care of that,” she says. “Congratulations.”

== Reception ==
The Futon Critic named it the 25th-best episode of 2003.
