= John M. Watson Sr. =

American actor

John M. Watson Sr. (January 10, 1937 – September 7, 2006) was an American jazz musician and actor. He is perhaps best known for his roles in films such as Groundhog Day, The Fugitive, Natural Born Killers, and Soul Food. He was also a trombonist with musicians Red Saunders and Count Basie.

== Life and career ==
Watson was born in Albany, New York, on January 10, 1937. His father was a musician who was a piano player. His mother was a college athlete and singer. Watson was raised in Middletown, Ohio. He graduated from Middletown High School in 1954, where he was a member of the band. After serving four years in the United States Army he attended Miami University where he also met his wife of 44 years, Virginia. They had had three sons and two daughters. Watson majored in Music Education and graduated in 1962. Watson was a member of the Miami University school band and also had his own band.

After graduation in 1962, he planned to travel to Los Angeles to pursue his dream of being a musician, but stopped in Chicago to see a family member and never left. Shortly after arriving in Chicago, he joined the Red Saunders Band, which was the 17 piece house band at the historic Regal Theater. He also traveled with various Motown acts including Marvin Gaye and the Four Tops. During this time he was a part of several recordings from artists such as Jack Mc Duff, James Cotton, Barbara Acklin and Etta James. Watson also worked as a band teacher during this time at Du Sable, Dunbar and CVS high schools.

In 1968 he joined the band at Jesse Jackson's Operation Breadbasket, led by Ben Branch. Watson would later serve as the musical director of Operation Push, and continued to play in the band until the late 70s. In 1969 he played with the Jackson Five until 1970, when he joined the Count Basie Band. He left the band in late 1972.

Upon returning from the road, he worked at Manley High School as the band director. Watson started the band from scratch, and turned it into one of the most successful high school bands in Chicago. In 1982 he left Manley and went to Hirsch High School as the band director.

In 1987 Watson appeared in a lottery commercial in Chicago which launched his acting career. Later that year, he took a role as Cutler, the bandleader in Ma Rainey's Black Bottom. The play became the highest grossing play in Chicago that year, and featured a young Harry Lennix. He had several theater roles over the years, including Two Train's Running, I'm Not Rappaport, and the Lion and the Jewel. He was also in the Steppenwolf Theater production of One Flew Over the Cuckoo's Nest, which starred Gary Sinise. After a successful run at the Steppenwolf, the play ran for nine months on Broadway, and six months in London. Watson also was a Joseph Jefferson Award Winner for his work as Musical Director of Duke Ellington's Play "Jump for Joy" which had a successful run at the Royal George Theater.

Watson's first movie role was as Harold Monroe in the 1990 movie Opportunity Knocks starring Dana Carvey. He had 13 movies to his credit, including key roles as Bones Roosevelt in The Fugitive, the Bartender in Groundhog Day, and Uncle Pete in Soul Food. He also made television appearances in The Untouchables and Early Edition, and appeared in numerous television and radio commercials.

He retired in 1996, but continued to perform around Chicago. Watson died on September 7, 2006, of non-Hodgkin lymphoma.
