= Sacrifice (Angel) =

- Angel episode
- Episode no.: Season 4 Episode 20
- Directed by: David Straiton
- Written by: Ben Edlund
- Production code: 4ADH20
- Original air date: April 23, 2003

Guest appearances
- Gina Torres as Jasmine; Avery Kidd Waddell as Randall Golden; Micah Henson as Matthew; Jeff Ricketts as Spider Monster; Tristine Skyler as Holly; Bradley Stryker as Sculpture Vamp; Taylor Lundeen as Little Girl

Episode chronology
← Previous "The Magic Bullet"	Next → "Peace Out"
- Angel season 4

"Sacrifice" is the 20th episode of the fourth season of the American television series Angel.

== Plot synopsis ==
Angel shuts the door on Connor, letting the others escape through the fire escape. Angel then barges out into the hall and begins to pound Connor into unconsciousness. As Fred and the others bring the car around on the street, Angel and Connor come flying out of the window. Angel gets in the car and orders Wesley to drive, even as Jasmine and her followers approach. They listen to a radio announcer reporting that the mayor has named L.A. a "citadel of Jasmine".

In her suite, Jasmine has several of her followers come to her while Connor wakes from his unconsciousness. Restored by feeding on her followers, Jasmine heals Connor and then reassures him that they'll deal with Angel and the others.

Wesley pulls up at a gas station. While Gunn fills the car, the others are attacked by people at the station speaking with Jasmine's voice. Once the car is filled, they all take off, but police cars and other followers chase after them. Leaving the car behind, Angel leads the others down into the sewers, where they are surprised by a group of young kids, who point sticks and makeshift spears at the gang. One of the kids recognizes Gunn and turns out to be Golden, the younger brother of one of Gunn's former crew members. Something causes their surroundings to shake and the youngest of the crew, Matthew, warns that it's back. The kids guide Angel and the others to their hideout, which is secured by bars and makeshift gates. Angel grabs a weapon and directs his team to go out and help get rid of this unidentified monster.

Connor goes to check on Jasmine, but finds that Cordelia is no longer on the bed. Jasmine explains that Cordy is in a safe place where her blood can't be used as a threat. Connor wants to go out and find Angel and the others, but Jasmine won't let him yet. Jasmine gouges her nails into Connor's hand as she demands that he let go of his pain and give it to her. As she releases his hand and Connor releases his pain, the wounds on his hand appear on hers as well.

While searching for the creature in the sewers, Golden is grabbed and pulled up into a high tunnel, but Angel flies up after him and saves him. Angel returns with his vampire face and scares Matthew into running away. Fred and Gunn chase after him, and Angel realizes that Wesley has been taken while they weren't looking.

Fred and Gunn chase after Matthew as they talk about feelings. They start to talk about when they killed the professor and how much that it hurts them both. They arrive on the surface and carefully scour the streets for Matthew, finding him in an alley. He refuses to return with them, so Gunn simply knocks the boy unconscious. Fred is stunned by the action, but helps Gunn carry the boy back anyway.

Angel tells Lorne to stay with the others while he goes to find Wesley, but in light of Angel's newly discovered demon side, Golden and the others are not keen on the idea of letting Angel out of their sight alone. With spears pointed at him, Angel doesn't bother trying to defend his nature, saying he wouldn't be able to, and instead points out that if he chose, he could kill them all without difficulty.

A demonic crab-like creature approaches Wesley, proclaiming that his kind loved "her" first. Once Wesley realizes that the demon is talking of Jasmine, the demon scolds Wesley for giving her a name, then scurries off to work on a mass of flesh and bone against a wall, cutting and stitching together the body of a vampire. Wesley questions where the demon is from and he points out a blue sphere that's the key to his dimension, but warns that the dimension is not one a human can survive. The demon explains that he's working on blood magic, not magic that consists of words. The vampire trapped in the sadistic web asks to just be killed, but the demon instead rips its tongue out. Wesley realizes that there is a word that can hurt Jasmine – her name – but the demon refuses to provide it and instead prepares to kill him, but Angel arrives in time to stop it, eventually managing to kill the demon.

Lorne lectures the rest of the gang about hurtful words just before Gunn and Fred return with Matthew, who begins to laugh in Jasmine's voice, which turns the others on Gunn, Lorne and Fred and the three run for their lives. Before they can get far, though, they run into Connor and a group of military men to back him up.

Wesley grabs the blue orb and explains the other dimension to Angel, while he ponders a way to make it work for them. Angel senses danger and Connor's presence. As Connor and Jasmine sense Angel in return, Angel signals the others to him and Wesley. Wesley figures blood magic is the answer to working the orb and uses a cut on his head as the source. A portal opens before them and while the others hold the door against Connor and the soldiers, Angel reluctantly takes the orb from Wesley and moves through the portal as the others finally release the door and prepare for battle, which is made more difficult because all the damage inflicted to the soldiers is healed by Jasmine instantly, making her followers practically immortal. Meanwhile, Angel finds himself in another dimension, surrounded by the Spider Demons.
