= Opportunity Knocks (film) =

1990 film by Donald Petrie

- Promotional movie poster for the film
- Directed by: Donald Petrie
- Written by: Mitchel Katlin; Nat Bernstein
- Produced by: Mark Gordon; Chris Meledandri
- Starring: Dana Carvey; Todd Graff; Julia Campbell; Robert Loggia
- Cinematography: Steven Poster
- Edited by: Virginia Katz; Marion Rothman
- Music by: Miles Goodman
- Production companies: Imagine Entertainment; Brad Grey Productions; The Meledandri/Gordon Company
- Distributed by: Universal Pictures
- Release date: March 30, 1990
- Running time: 101 minutes
- Country: United States
- Language: English
- Budget: $13 million
- Box office: $11,359,129

Opportunity Knocks is a 1990 American comedy film starring Dana Carvey. It was directed by Donald Petrie.

== Synopsis ==
Con men Eddie Farrell and Lou Pesquino need cash fast and pretend to be repair men sent to fix a gas leak. The con fails, but they escape.

Eddie and Lou find an empty house that they decide to burglarize. When they learn from a message on the answering machine that the owner is out of the country and the man who was going to house-sit can't make it, they spend the night.

The next day, Eddie and Lou are on the run from thugs sent by local gangster Sal Nichols who mistakenly thinks they stole a briefcase containing $60,000. After they find themselves separated, Eddie takes refuge in the empty house.

In the morning, Eddie walks out of the shower and meets Mona Malkin, whose son owns the house. She assumes Eddie is the house-sitter. Eddie plays along, meeting Mona's businessman husband Milt, who offers him a job.

Eddie decides to run a "love con" on Milt's daughter Annie in order to gain access to Milt's money. However, Lou is captured by Nichols.

Eddie and his aunt Connie and uncle Max conspire to get Nichols off their backs for good. Along the way, Eddie falls in love with Annie.

== Cast ==
- Dana Carvey as Eddie Farrell
- Robert Loggia as Milt Malkin
- Todd Graff as Lou Pesquino
- Julia Campbell as Dr. Annie Malkin
- Milo O'Shea as Max
- James Tolkan as Sal Nichols
- Doris Belack as Mona Malkin
- Sally Gracie as Connie
- Mike Bacarella as Pinkie
- John M. Watson, Sr. as Harold Monroe
- Beatrice Fredman as Bubbie
- Thomas McElroy as Men's Room Attendant
- Gene Honda as Japanese Businessman
- Del Close as Williamson
- Michelle Johnston as Club Singer
- Lorna Raver as Eddie's Secretary
- Judith Scott as Milt's Secretary

== Reception ==
=== Box office ===
The film was not a success and earned $11 million against a production budget of $13 million. The film's original teaser trailer involved Carvey's Saturday Night Live character The Church Lady, though she does not appear in the film.

=== Critical response ===
On Rotten Tomatoes the film has a score of 11% based on reviews from 9 critics.

== Soundtrack ==
The song "Cruel, Crazy, Beautiful World" by Johnny Clegg is featured over the end credits.
