= Bradley Stryker =

American actor

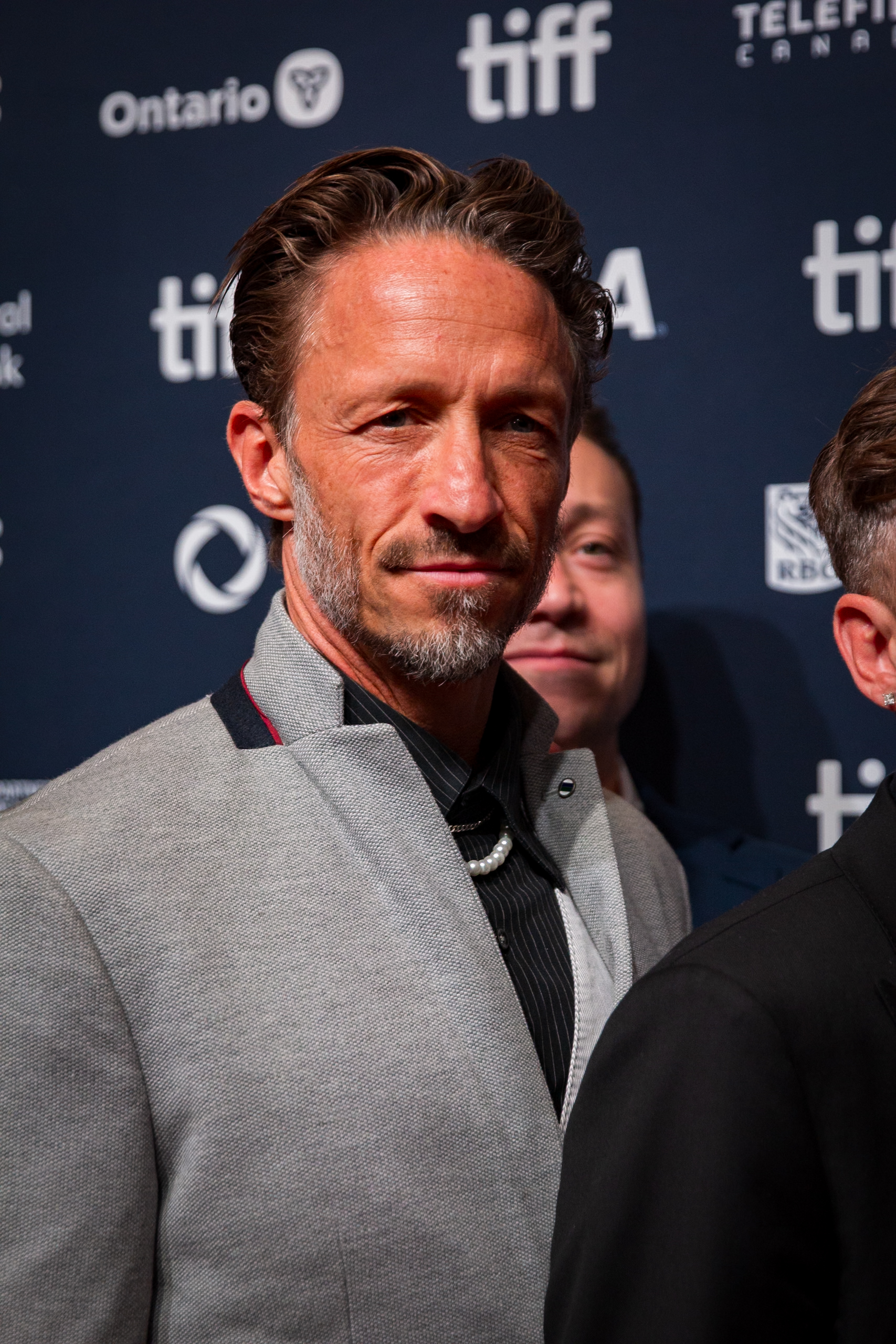
- Stryker in 2024
- Born: June 29, 1977 (age 49)
- Occupation: Actor
- Years active: 2001–present

Bradley Stryker (born June 29, 1977) is an American actor who portrayed Trey Atwood in the series The O.C. on Fox.

He has a lead role in the feature film, Tillamook Treasure (2006), playing Tom, the sidekick of logger Jimmy Kimbell.

Stryker also had a role in Bruce Almighty, as well as the homoerotic thrillers The Brotherhood and Wolves of Wall Street. He was in "Night, Mother", a first-season episode of the television crime series CSI: NY. He also appears as lead actor in the 2004 Renault Clio and Nokia commercial directed by Carter & Blitz.

In late 2010, he portrayed the DC Comics villain Deadshot in "Shield", the second episode of Smallville's final season.

== Filmography ==
=== Film ===
Year	Title	Role	Notes
2001	The Brotherhood	Devon Eisley	Video
2001	Final Stab	Patrick	Video
2002	Wolves of Wall Street	Kennison	
2006	Tillamook Treasure	Tom	
2006	110%: When Blood, Sweat and Tears Are Not Enough	Mr. Jennings	
2011	The American Dream	Chuck	
2011	Red Rabbit	Archer Ross	Video short
2017	Land of Smiles	Dale	
2017	Drone	Ted Little	
2017	Max 2: White House Hero	Chef Coop	
2019	Cold Pursuit	Limbo	
2019	Get Gone	Grant	Post-production
2020	Let Him Go	Sheriff Nevelson	
2023	Mercy	Mick	
2024	The Order	Sam Stinson	
2026	The Holiday Hitman	Paulie	Also director, co-writer

=== Television ===
Year	Title	Role	Notes
2001	Family Law	Eddie Mendoza	"Recovery"
2001	The Huntress	Arno	"Ah, Wilderness"
2002	Strong Medicine	Franky	"Outcomes"
2003	Angel	Sculpture Vamp	"Sacrifice"
2003	Crossing Jordan	Jack	"Pandora's Trunk: Part 1"
2003	The O.C.	Trey Atwood	"Premiere", "The Homecoming"
2004	CSI: NY	Jason	"Night, Mother"
2005	Las Vegas	Eric Nesterenko / Kellen Phillips	"To Protect and Serve Manicotti"
2005	Cold Case	Joe Young (1985)	"Kensington"
2005	Just Legal	Kem Hunt	"Pilot"
2006	Windfall	Colin Evett	"Changing Partners", "The Myth of More", "Crash Into You"
2007	Termination Point	Van Elden	TV film
2008	To Love and Die	Officer Harve	TV film
2009	Stargate Universe	Curtis	"Air: Parts 1-3"
2009	The Farm	CO Mark Perry	TV film
2009	Supernatural	Uncle Ted	"Family Remains"
2010	Psych	Stu Crawford	"Thrill Seekers and Hell Raisers"
2010–11	Smallville	Deadshot	"Shield", "Collateral"
2012	Arctic Air	Wade	"Hijacked"
2012	Fringe	Rick	"Letters of Transit"
2012	True Justice	Leka	"Violence of Action", "Dirty Money"
2013	Red Widow	Wallace	"The Escape"
2014	Unforgettable	Greg Zoller	"Reunion"
2015	Supernatural	Tony	"The Hunter Games"
2015	The Lizzie Borden Chronicles	Skipjack	TV miniseries
2016	iZombie	Kenny	"The Whopper", "Eternal Sunshine of the Caffeinated Mind", "Salivation Army"
2017	The 100	Baylis	"Gimme Shelter", "God Complex"
2017	The Arrangement	Bryson	"Control"
2017	Witness Protection	Davis	TV film
2017–18	Damnation	Tanner	Recurring role
2017–18	Chesapeake Shores	John Rawl	Recurring role (seasons 2–3)
2018	Lost in Space	BK / Driller	"2.4"
2018	El Recluso	Jack	"1.1"
2019	Heartland	Tony	"12.6"
2021	Law & Order: Special Victims Unit	Jimmy Gunn	"The Only Way Out Is Through"
2022	FBI	Eric Ward	"Into the Fire"
2022	Devil in Ohio	Sheriff Wilkins	Recurring role
2024	Tracker	Tom Tozer	"Springland"
