= Julia Campbell =

American actress

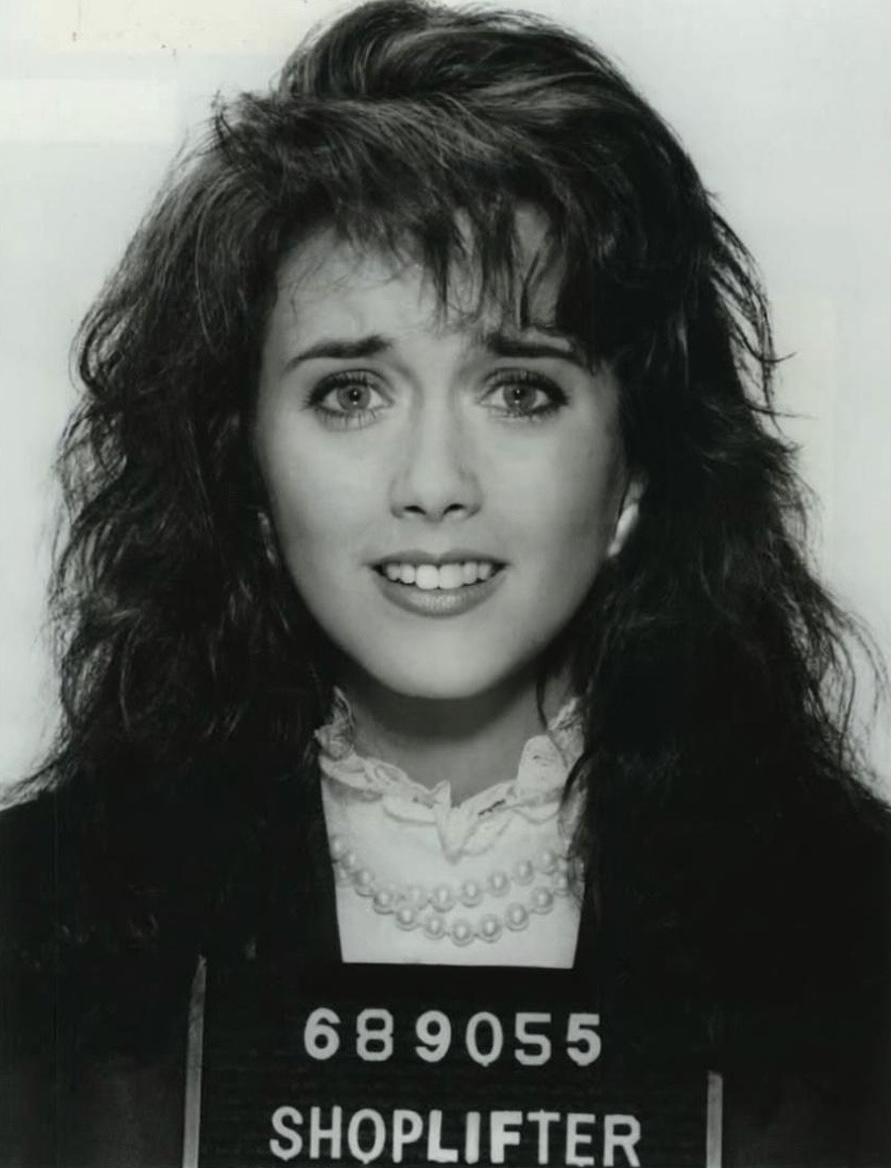
- Campbell in Women in Prison, 1987
- Born: March 12, 1963 (age 63); Redstone Arsenal, Alabama, U.S.
- Occupation: Actress
- Years active: 1984–present
- Spouse: Jay Karnes (m. 1997)
- Children: 2

Julia Campbell (born March 12, 1963) is an American actress. She began her career starring in the daytime television soap operas Ryan's Hope and Santa Barbara, before playing the lead in the short-lived sitcom Women in Prison (1987–1988). Her most noted role to date was "mean girl" Christie Masters in the 1997 comedy film Romy and Michele's High School Reunion.

== Life and career ==
Campbell was born in Redstone Arsenal, near Huntsville, Alabama, the daughter of a model mother and an army officer father. Campbell made her television debut playing Ryan's granddaughter Maura "Katie" Thompson in the ABC daytime soap opera Ryan's Hope from 1984 to 1985. In 1986, she played Courtney Capwell in the NBC soap opera, Santa Barbara. In 1987, she starred in the Fox sitcom Women in Prison. The series was canceled after 13 episodes. In 1989, she was a regular cast member in the other short-lived sitcom, Knight & Daye.

In 1990, Campbell starred opposite Dana Carvey in the comedy film Opportunity Knocks and later appeared in films Livin' Large (1991) and Romy and Michele's High School Reunion (1997). During the 1990s, Campbell starred in a number of made-for-television movies and was lead actress in the 1992 unsold pilot of The Witches of Eastwick. She was a regular cast member on short-lived sitcoms Cutters (1993), Blue Skies (1994), A Whole New Ballgame (1995), Men Behaving Badly (1996) and Champs (1996). She also had recurring roles on Herman's Head, Martial Law, Still Standing and Dexter, and guest-starred on Ally McBeal, Malcolm in the Middle, Seinfeld ("The Frogger" episode), Friends, House, The Mentalist, The Practice, The Pretender, Two and a Half Men, CSI: Crime Scene Investigation, Criminal Minds and Justified. She co-starred in the 2002 miniseries Rose Red and had a starring role in the 2006 drama film, Tillamook Treasure (2006), in which she plays Kathryn Kimbell, the mother of the story's lead character. She appeared on the last episode of the series The Shield, on which her husband Jay Karnes played the character of Dutch Wagenbach, as a lawyer for Dutch's partner, Steve Billings, who is instantly attracted to Dutch.

== Personal life ==
She is married to actor Jay Karnes. Before that, she was married to actor Bernard White.

== Filmography ==
=== Film ===
Year	Title	Role	Notes
1990	Opportunity Knocks	Annie Malkin	
1991	Livin' Large	Missy Carnes	
1997	Romy and Michele's High School Reunion	Christie Masters	
1998	Rough Draft	Juliette	
2000	Bounce	Sue	
2001	Thank Heaven	Victoria Brady	
2005	Kicking & Screaming	Janet Davidson	
2006	Tillamook Treasure	Kathryn Kimbell	
2012	Arcadia	Mrs. Acres	
2023	Jesus Revolution	Kay Smith	
2027	Romy and Michele 2	Christie Masters	Filming

=== Television ===
Year	Title	Role	Notes
1984–1985	Ryan's Hope	Katie Thompson Greenberg	TV series
1986	Santa Barbara	Courtney Capwell	Regular role
1987	Werewolf	Sally	Episode: "Running with the Pack"
1987–1988	Women in Prison	Vicki Springer	Main role
1989	Knight & Daye	Janet Glickman	3 episodes: "Pilot", "New York! New York?", "Goodbye, Mr. Scrimshaw"
1990	Johnny Ryan	Eve Manion	TV film
1992	Ned Blessing: The True Story of My Life	Jilly Blue	TV film
1992	The Witches of Eastwick	Jane Hollis	TV film
1992	Herman's Head	Elizabeth	Recurring role (season 2)
1993	Cutters	Lynn Fletcher	Main role
1993	Murder, She Wrote	Sharon Baskin	Episode: "A Virtual Murder"
1994	Twilight Zone: Rod Serling's Lost Classics	Maureen	Segment: "Where the Dead Are"
1994	The Adventures of Young Indiana Jones: Hollywood Follies	Kitty	TV film
1994	Blue Skies	Ellie Baskin	Main role
1995	A Whole New Ballgame	Meg O'Donnell	Main role
1995	Party of Five	Monica	Episode: "Best Laid Plans"
1996	Men Behaving Badly	Cherie Miller	Main role (season 1)
1996	Champs	Doris Heslov	Main role
1998	Seinfeld	Lisi	Episode: "The Frogger"
1998	Legion of Fire: Killer Ants!	Laura Sills	TV film
1998	Poodle Springs	Miriam 'Muffy' Blackstone-Nichols	TV film
1998	The Practice	A.D.A. Fields	Episode: "Reasons to Believe"
1998	The Pretender	Kristi Kincaid	Episode: "Someone to Trust"
1998–1999	Martial Law	Melanie George	Recurring role (season 1)
1999	A Slight Case of Murder	Patricia Stapelli	TV film
1999	Oh, Grow Up	Julie Sheffield	TV film
2000	Bull	Dr. Mary Parker	Episode: "To Have and to Hold"
2000	Friends	Whitney	Episode: "The One with the Engagement Picture"
2000	Hey Neighbor	Barbara	TV film
2001	Judging Amy	Calla Hawkins	2 episodes: "Redheaded Stepchild", "Hold on Tight"
2001	Reba	Caroline	Episode: "You Make Me Sick"
2002	Rose Red	Ellen Rimbauer	TV miniseries
2002	Ally McBeal	Kelly Bridgeman	Episode: "The New Day"
2003	Crossing Jordan	Maddy Whitford	Episode: "Fire and Ice"
2004–2005	Still Standing	Shelly	3 episodes: "Still Neighbors", "Still Fast", "Still Using"
2005	Malcolm in the Middle	Donna	Episode: "Mrs. Tri-County"
2006	Two and a Half Men	Francine	Episode: "And the Plot Moistens"
2006	3 lbs	Roberta Mack	Episode: "Lost for Words"
2007	Desperate Housewives	Muriel	Episode: "Now You Know"
2007	Pushing Daisies	Emma Newsome	Episode: "Corpsicle"
2008	In Treatment	Olivia	Episodes: "Sophie: Weeks Five & Eight"
2008	The Shield	Ellen Carmichael	Episode: "Family Meeting"
2009	Heroes	Mary Campbell	Episode: "Trust and Blood"
2009	Scrubs	Mrs. Fremont	Episode: "My ABC's"
2009	Big Love	Vicky Nabors	Episode: "Come, Ye Saints"
2009	House	Melanie	Episode: "The Softer Side"
2009	Hawthorne	Beth Johnson	Episode: "The Sense of Belonging"
2009	The Cleaner	Marcia Fisher	Episode: "Path of Least Resistance"
2009	The Mentalist	Nina Hodge	Episode: "Red Menace"
2009	Dexter	Sally Mitchell	Recurring role (season 4)
2010	CSI: Crime Scene Investigation	Janet Marie Marsh	Episode: "Lost & Found"
2010	No Ordinary Family	Nina Claremont	Episode: "No Ordinary Marriage"
2010	The Event	Val Buchanan	2 episodes: "I Haven't Told You Everything", "A Matter of Life and Death"
2010	Lie to Me	Carol Ashland	Episode: "Beyond Belief"
2011	The Craigslist Killer	Susan McAllister	TV film
2011	CSI: Miami	Gretchen Cambridge	Episode: "Stiff"
2011	Criminal Minds	Martha Slade	Episode: "Painless"
2011, 2016	Awkward	Tamara's Mom	2 episodes: "Queen Bee-atches", "Living in Sin"
2012–2013	Austin & Ally	Penny Dawson	3 episodes: "Backups & Breakups", "Chapters & Choices", "Partners & Parachutes"
2013	Justified	Eve Munro	2 episodes: "Truth and Consequences", "Outlaw"
2016	Recovery Road	Pamela Granger	3 episodes: "The Weaklings", "Your Side of the Street", "(Be)coming Clean"
2016	Who Killed JonBenét?	Patsy Ramsey	TV film
2018–2019	The Resident	Vivian Betournay	2 episodes: "Nightmares", "Stuck as Foretold"
2019	Tell Me a Story	Cora	2 episodes: "Writer's Block", "Number One Fan"
