= Knight & Daye =

- Genre: Sitcom
- Created by: Lowell Ganz; Babaloo Mandel
- Written by: Lowell Ganz; Babaloo Mandel; Kevin White
- Directed by: Jeffrey Ganz
- Starring: (See article)
- Composer: David Michael Frank
- Country of origin: United States
- Original language: English
- No. of seasons: 1
- No. of episodes: 7

Production
- Cinematography: Gary W. Scott
- Running time: 30 minutes
- Production company: Imagine Television

Original release
- Network: NBC
- Release: July 8 – August 14, 1989

Knight & Daye is an American sitcom that aired on NBC from July 8 to August 14, 1989. The show was about a pair of radio broadcasters, Hank Knight and Everett Daye, who hadn't spoken to each other in years; despite their estrangement, they accept an offer to work together on the air again, and try their best to get along.

== Cast ==
- Jack Warden as Hank Knight
- Mason Adams as Everett Daye
- Hope Lange as Gloria Daye
- Shiri Appleby as Amy Escobar
- Julia Campbell as Janet Glickman
- Joe Cipriano as "Marty in the Morning"
- Glenn Walker Harris Jr. as Dougie Escobar
- Lela Ivey as Ellie Escobar
- Joe Lala as Cito Escobar
- Emily Schulman as Chris Escobar
- Brittany Thornton as Laurie Escobar

== Episodes ==
No.	Title	Original release date	Viewers (millions)
1	"Knight & Daye"	July 8, 1989	17.5
2	"Sugar Momma"	July 12, 1989	14.7
3	"New York! New York?"	July 19, 1989	11.8
4	"Still Motile After All These Years"	July 26, 1989	14.8
5	"Stalk Radio"	August 2, 1989	12.3
6	"Goodbye, Mr. Scrimshaw"	August 9, 1989	13.2
7	"The Last Honest Man in America"	August 14, 1989	20.5
