= Brian Bianchini =

American model & actor (1978–2004)

- Born: Brian Leo Bianchini; July 16, 1978; San Francisco, California, U.S.
- Died: March 16, 2004 (aged 25); San Francisco, California, U.S.
- Years active: 1990s–2000s
- Modeling information
- Height: 6 ft 1 in (1.85 m)

Brian Leo Bianchini (July 16, 1978 – March 16, 2004) was an American male model and occasional film actor, active from the late 1990s through the mid-2000s.

== Early life ==
Bianchini was born in San Francisco to Italian parents, and attended Mills High School in Millbrae, California. He also attended Skyline College in San Bruno, California. He started wrestling at the age of seven and won both high school and intercollegiate wrestling competitions.

== Modeling career ==
Bianchini was photographed by some of the world's most renowned photographers, including Bruce Weber, Roger Moenks, David LaChapelle, Martin Ryter, Steven Klein, Chris Makos and George Machado among others. In addition to campaigns for Reebok, Versace, Abercrombie & Fitch and print ads for International Male and Undergear, Bianchini was featured in Vanity Fair, Men's Exercise, Glamour, Cosmopolitan, Playgirl and Men's Fitness magazines. He was also featured in cover articles for TV Guide and Instinct. Bianchini also appeared on the cover of Gloria Estefan's Alma Caribena album, and appeared in music videos for Moby and Lil' Kim.

== Death ==
Heavily depressed at 25, Bianchini hanged himself in March 2004. He was buried at Italian Cemetery in Colma, California.

== Modeling credits ==
- First Runner Up – All American Guys – 1999 Guy of the Year
- First Runner Up – Playgirl – Man of the Year – 2001

== Filmography ==
- The Brotherhood
- " Girl For Girl"
- The Black Magic (2002)
