= Home (Angel) =

- Angel episode
- Episode no.: Season 4 Episode 22
- Directed by: Tim Minear
- Written by: Tim Minear
- Production code: 4ADH22
- Original air date: May 7, 2003

Guest appearances
- Stephanie Romanov as Lilah Morgan; Jim Abele as Connor's Father; Jonathan M. Woodward as Knox; Jason Winer as Preston; Michael Halsey as Sirk; Merle Dandridge as Lacey; Jason Padgett as Suicidal Cop; James Calvert as Surgery Patient; Anthony Diaz-Perez as Hostage Father; Adrienne Brett Evans as Connor's Mother; Stacy Solodkin as Connor's Aunt; Emma Hunton as Connor's Kid Sister; Ariel Baker as Angel Greeter #1; Michael Ness as Angel Greeter #2; Alex Craig Mann as Angel Greeter #3; Nichole Pelerine as Angel Greeter #4; Joshua Grenrock as Angel Greeter #5

Episode chronology
← Previous "Peace Out"	Next → "Conviction"
- Angel season 4

"Home" is the 22nd episode of the fourth season of the American television series Angel. Written and directed by Tim Minear, it was originally broadcast on May 7, 2003 on the WB network. In the Season Four finale, Connor – having defeated Jasmine in the previous episode – plans to blow himself up with a comatose Cordelia and other hostages, while an undead Lilah Morgan offers Angel Investigations control of the Wolfram & Hart L.A. branch.

== Plot ==
While Wesley doubts that the Lilah before them is real, Angel (with his preternatural vampire senses) confirms that it is really her. Lilah also shows her beheading scar as she explains that the "Senior Partners", the ruling counsel of the demonic firm who are based in Hell, are offering them control as thanks for bringing back chaos and discord in Los Angeles, which the group intended for the greater good. On the streets, while people raid stores, Connor spots a cop on top of a building, and catches him before he shoots himself with his own gun. The confused cop reveals that he has a family that are his "home". Enraged by the thought that the man would leave his family, Connor attacks the cop.

Wesley confides his doubts to Gunn, worrying his remaining feelings for Lilah cloud his perspective. Lorne returns without news on Connor or Cordelia, but with the news that mayhem has been released on the streets in the aftermath. Angel warns the others against going to Wolfram & Hart, but as dawn approaches, the group finds themselves drawn to the offer of touring the Wolfram & Hart offices. One by one, they sneak off and get into the limo, surprised to see the others there.

At the office, the group is approached by guides for their individual tours. Lorne is introduced to the manager of the entertainment department, who gives Lorne a glimpse of the talent managed by the firm. Wesley's guide, former Watcher Rutherford Sirk, impresses him with a vast collection of mystical references. Fred's guide is Knox, a smart young man who shows off the science department which she would run. Lilah shows Angel his new office, private elevator, and special windows that allow him to be in the sun without burning. She presents him with a file labeled "Sunnydale" and an amulet that Buffy needs for her upcoming battle with the First Evil, but he still acts uninterested. But when Lilah shows him a TV news report about Connor holding several people hostage, including the comatose Cordelia, in a sporting-goods store, Angel is finally ready to make a deal. Gunn is met by an attractive woman, and after mentioning he does not see how he would fit in at Wolfram & Hart, she takes him on a long elevator ride to the White Room. Alone in the room, Gunn is greeted by a black panther.

Connor shouts at one of his captives, who struggles to hold his crying daughter because of a broken arm, then notices Angel has arrived. Meanwhile, Wesley knocks Sirk unconscious and makes his way to the records room, where Lilah finds him searching through the files. Wesley finds her contract with the law firm and burns it in an effort to free her, but the contract just reappears in the drawer. She says she already knew the price when she signed the contract but still appreciates the gesture.

Angel cautiously approaches Connor as the teen warns the hostages are rigged with explosives. As Connor rises - revealing he and a still unconscious Cordelia are rigged similarly - he rages that he cannot seem to feel anything but unloved. Angel tries to promise a better future, but Connor, unconvinced, starts to push the detonation trigger. Angel punches him, yanks the trigger from the explosives around Connor, releases the hostages, and throws a knife into Connor's leg before he can injure Cordelia. Promising to prove his love, Angel brings the knife down in a deadly blow, fulfilling the prophecy.

In the lobby, the others are considering accepting their job offers, then Angel says he already took the deal on their behalf. Lilah confirms that Cordelia is getting the best of care and vows to ensure she recovers from her coma. Completing their deal, Angel asks to see Connor and Lilah reluctantly agrees to let it happen, despite it not being part of the deal. She hands over the folder on Sunnydale along with the amulet and Angel leaves to see Connor, whom the others seem to have forgotten existed. A limo takes Angel to a cabin in the woods where he spies through the window. Connor sits with his new family as they enjoy dinner and laugh about the promising college life before him. Angel walks away, pleased that his son has a new life filled with the love and happiness he lacked.

== Production details ==
The scenes in the Wolfram & Hart offices were shot on location in the Thousand Oaks business complex. "They were kind enough to let us come in on a working day," Tim Minear explains, and worked while the crew was filming.

The "White Room" scene was accomplished via greenscreen and split screen. The endless room in the background was computer generated, with an actual leopard on the same stage as J. August Richards. While filming, the big cat "kind of got out of its chain," says Minear. "J. thankfully didn't tell me until the shot was done and they had it back in its chain because I would have run screaming from the room like a girl."

=== Writing ===
Tim Minear returned to Angel for this episode, after having not written for Angel since "Benediction" due to being busy with Firefly. He both wrote and directed the episode, which he says acted like a pilot in order to demonstrate to both the network and the television audience that the show could move in a new and interesting direction. Minear says, "It's setting up the new configuration for the show." Writer David Fury explains, "You can't sell [the network] on a show they've already been producing so you have to kind of sell them on a new paradigm - something to enliven it. It may not be broke but they feel like a little change won't hurt."

Minear explains that he decided to open this episode with the assumption that Lilah's offer of taking over Wolfram & Hart happened off-screen during the commercial break. "I watched the clock for 40 or 50 seconds and have each actor just shift uncomfortably for about a minute. It got pretty hilarious after a while but I got all the pieces. And Stephanie just kicked it out. So once my name is clear of the screen," Tim laughs, "someone will speak."

Wesley's guide around Wolfram & Hart asks him how he knew he was a Watcher. Wesley says, "there's something about Watchers and libraries," referencing Rupert Giles (Buffy Summers' Watcher), who was employed as the Sunnydale High School librarian during the first three seasons of Buffy.

This episode's tone mirrors that of the Season 4 finale of "Buffy." Whedon comments about "Restless" that he didn't want to do the traditional big action, explosion, fighting finale that had been done in previous Buffy finales. For this episode, there is no significant fight sequence barring Angel and Connor toward the end of the episode. Both episodes also precede significant story changers; Buffy with new 14-year-old sister Dawn, and Angel now in charge of the L.A. branch of Wolfram and Hart.

=== Cordelia's departure ===
Home is the last episode to feature the character of Cordelia Chase as a regular character; she had been present since the very beginning of the series and Charisma Carpenter's pregnancy had been written into the storyline for her character throughout season 4. The reasons for Carpenter's departure seemed initially to indicate a mutual agreement between her and series creator Joss Whedon but in February 2021, Carpenter would reveal a "toxic culture" on the set of Angel (later corroborated by some of the cast from sister series Buffy The Vampire Slayer) and said that Whedon had repeatedly bullied her whilst pregnant before firing her. Despite this, Carpenter would return for one final episode in the following season (You're Welcome (Angel), also the 100th episode of the series).
