= Cutters (TV series) =

- Genre: Sitcom
- Created by: Allan Burns; Burt Metcalfe; Howard Michael Gould; Lindsay Harrison
- Starring: Robert Hays; Dakin Matthews
- Composer: Patrick Williams
- Country of origin: United States
- Original language: English
- No. of seasons: 1
- No. of episodes: 5

Production
- Camera setup: Multi-camera
- Running time: 30 minutes
- Production companies: Turnaround Productions; Grant/Tribune Productions; Touchstone Television

Original release
- Network: CBS
- Release: June 11 – July 9, 1993

Cutters is an American sitcom starring Robert Hays that aired on CBS from June 11 until July 9, 1993.

== Premise ==
A barbershop in Buffalo, New York has to share a building with a funky beauty salon when a wall is torn down.

== Cast ==
=== Main ===
- Robert Hays as Joe Polachek
- Dakin Matthews as Harry Polachek
- Margaret Whitton as Adrienne St. John
- Julia Campbell as Lynn Fletcher
- Julius Carry as Troy King
- Robin Tunney as Deborah
- Ray Buktenica as Chad

=== Recurring ===
- Alan Cumming as Leo
- Bob Newhart as Trevor
- Gregory Hines as Bud

=== Guest stars ===
- Fred Willard as Mr Jackson
- Norm Macdonald as Randy
- Judith Light as Sandy

== Episodes ==
No.	Title	Directed by	Written by	Original release date
1	"Pilot"	Andy Cadiff	Unknown	June 11, 1993
Joe wants his dad to merge the barbershop with the beauty salon next door.
2	"Where's Harry?"	Andy Cadiff	Unknown	June 18, 1993
Harry wants to study at a beauty college.
3	"Give 'Till It Hurts"	Andy Cadiff	Unknown	June 25, 1993
Chad wins Lynn's heart with a charitable facade.
4	"Harry's Best Friend"	Andy Cadiff	Unknown	July 2, 1993
An old friend of Harry has a surprise about his lifestyle.
5	"Hi There, Sports Fans"	Andy Cadiff	Unknown	July 9, 1993
Joe feuds with Lynn over a magazine's swimsuit edition.
