= Samuel Page =

American actor (born 1976)

- Born: Samuel L. Elliott; November 5, 1976 (age 50); Whitefish Bay, Wisconsin, U.S.
- Other names: Samuel B. Elliott; Sam Elliott; Sam Page; Nathan Watkins
- Education: Princeton University (BA)
- Occupation: Actor
- Years active: 1999–present
- Spouse: Cassidy Elliott (m. 2014)
- Children: 3

Samuel L. Elliott (born November 5, 1976), known professionally as Samuel Page or Sam Page, is an American actor. He has appeared on popular television shows, such as All My Children, Mad Men, Desperate Housewives, House of Cards, Switched at Birth, Scandal, Unbreakable Kimmy Schmidt, Gossip Girl, and The Bold Type.

== Early life ==
Page was born in Whitefish Bay, Wisconsin. He captained the football and baseball teams at Whitefish Bay High School. He attended Princeton University, where he earned a BA in ecology and evolutionary biology in 1998.

== Career ==
After completing his degree, Page decided to become an actor despite having no high school acting experience. "I came home and told my mom and dad I was moving to Hollywood to become an actor." While in Los Angeles, Page appeared on the television shows Desperate Housewives, Popular, 7th Heaven, Undressed, and Men, Women & Dogs. In New York City, he was cast in 2002 as Trey Kenyon on the daytime soap opera All My Children.

Page had a recurring role in American Dreams and guest-starred in other series, such as CSI: Miami and Wicked Science. In 2005, he was cast as Jesse Parker on Fox's supernatural drama Point Pleasant. In 2006, he had a starring role on the CBS drama series Shark. He played Joan Holloway's fiancé and then husband, Greg Harris, on Mad Men, and in 2010 he appeared in a multi-episode arc on ABC's Desperate Housewives as Sam, son of Rex Van de Kamp (Steven Culp) and stepson of Bree Hodge (Marcia Cross).

In 2008, Page appeared in will.i.am's video "Yes We Can" in support of Barack Obama's presidential bid, along with numerous other celebrities. In addition to television, Page's film credits include The Brotherhood, Prison of the Dead, and Micro Mini-Kids. Page was featured as one of People magazine's most eligible bachelors in June 2002.

In 2010, Page guest-starred in the fourth season of The CW's Gossip Girl as Colin Forrester, a young college professor and Serena van der Woodsen's (Blake Lively) new love interest. Colin was also Juliet Sharp (Katie Cassidy) and Ben Donovan (David Call)'s cousin. Page appeared on the cover of the February 2011 issue of J.Crew's clothing catalogue and magazine. In 2012, Page had a starring role in the Lifetime film In the Dark as Jeff, an aide hired to assist a beautiful young artist recently blinded in a car crash that killed her husband and child. However, he soon begins to stalk and terrorize her.

In 2013, Page joined the cast of the Netflix drama series House of Cards for their second season. In 2017, he played the lead role in the Hallmark Channel film Royal New Year's Eve as Prince Jeffery. In February, 2019, he starred in another romantic Hallmark Movie, 'The Story of Us', playing Sawyer O'Dell, a property builder planning a development that threatens a bookstore owned by his former high school sweetheart.

In 2017, Page joined the cast of The Bold Type as Richard Hunter, on the Scarlet Board of Directors, and Sutton's love interest.

== Personal life ==
In 2014, Page married Cassidy Boesch at a villa just outside Santa Barbara, California. Among Page's groomsmen was Mean Girls star and Dancing with the Stars contestant Jonathan Bennett. On September 27, 2016, Page announced the birth of their son, Logan, and on August 11, 2018, their twin girls were born (Annabelle and Evie).

== Filmography ==
=== Film ===
Year	Title	Role	Notes
2000	Prison of the Dead	Calvin	
2001	The Brotherhood	Chris Chandler	Credited as Nathan Watkins
2001	Micro Mini-Kids	Blake	Credited as Samuel Elliott
2005	Wish You Were Here	David Dunsmore	
2005	Cruel World	Daniel Anderson	
2009	Slave	David Dunsmore	
2009	Falling Up	Buck	
2010	The United Monster Talent Agency	David	Short film
2011	Starsucker	Pete Thump	Short film
2011	A Proper Send-Off	Paul	Short film
2012	Valediction	Miles Thomas	Short film
2014	Serial Daters Anonymous	Kyle	
2015	1915	James	
2015	Self/less	Carl	
2015	The Preppie Connection	Mr. Jennings	
2015	Caught	Justin Price	
2016	The Tiger Hunter	Kenneth Porter	
2018	Walking the Dog	Keith	

=== Television ===
Year	Title	Role	Notes
1999	Popular	Stone Cold Fox Boy	3 episodes; credited as Samuel L. Elliott
1999–2000	7th Heaven	Brad Landers	3 episodes
2000	Undressed	Sam	8 episodes
2001	Men, Women & Dogs	Tom	Episode: "The Magic Three-Legged Sex Dog"
2002–2003	All My Children	Trey Kenyon	Role held: March 28, 2002 – March 7, 2003
2003–2004	American Dreams	Drew Mandel	12 episodes
2005–2006	Point Pleasant	Jesse Parker	Main cast; 13 episodes
2005	CSI: Miami	Jeff Marshall	Episode: "Prey"
2006–2007	Shark	Casey Woodland	Main cast (season 1); 22 episodes
2008	Finish Line	Mitch Camponella	Television film
2008	Imaginary Bitches	Riley	Episode: "Only Crazy Girls Quife"
2008–2012	Mad Men	Greg Harris	9 episodes
2009	CSI: NY	Liam Connover	Episode: "Communication Breakdown"
2009	Melrose Place	Victor	Episode: "Vine"
2010–2011	Greek	Joel	4 episodes
2010	Desperate Housewives	Sam Allen	7 episodes
2010	Gossip Girl	Colin Forrester	4 episodes
2010	The Event	Rick	Episode: "Casualties of War"
2010	Castle	Brian Elliott	Episode: "Last Call"
2011	Lie to Me	George Walker	Episode: "Rebound"
2011	Up All Night	Dr. Goddard	Episode: "Birth"
2011	Annie Claus Is Coming to Town	Ted	Television film (Hallmark)
2012, 2015	Switched at Birth	Craig Tebbe	9 episodes
2012	The Client List	TJ Braswell	Episode: "Turn the Page"
2012	Imaginary Friend	Robert	Television film
2012	Last Resort	Kylie's brother	Episode: "Cinderella Liberty"
2013	In the Dark	Jeff	Television film
2013	Scandal	Will Caldwell	Episode: "Boom Goes the Dynamite"
2013	Necessary Roughness	Sam Conte	2 episodes
2014	House of Cards	Connor Ellis	5 episodes
2014	The Mindy Project	Andy	Episode: "Mindy and Danny"
2015	Stalker	Mike Harris	Episode: "My Hero"
2015	Adam Ruins Everything	Dr. Todd Bodd	Episode: "Adam Ruins Nutrition"
2016	All Things Valentine	Brendan	Television film (Hallmark)
2016	Unbreakable Kimmy Schmidt	Keith Habersohl	Episode: "Kimmy Walks Into a Bar!"
2017	Walking the Dog	Keith	Television film (Hallmark)
2017–2021	The Bold Type	Richard Hunter	Main cast
2017	The Perfect Christmas Present	Tom Jacobs	Television film (Hallmark)
2017	A Royal New Year's Eve	Prince Jeffrey	Television film (Hallmark)
2019	The Story of Us	Sawyer Odell	Television film (Hallmark)
2019	My One and Only	Alex	Television film (Hallmark)
2019	Christmas in Rome	Oliver Martin	Television film (Hallmark)
2020	Celebrity Family Feud	Himself	Episode: The Bold Type vs. RuPaul's Drag Race
2020	A Godwink Christmas: Second Chance, First Love	Pat Godfrey	Television film (Hallmark)
2020	Secret Society of Second-Born Royals	King Robert	Television film (Disney+)
2021	One Summer	Jack	Television film (Hallmark)
2021	Joy for Christmas	Jack Kane	Television film (GAC Family)
2022	Brazen	Ed Jennings	Television film (Netflix)
2023	Grey's Anatomy	Sam Sutton	Recurring role
2023	Rescuing Christmas	Sam	Television film (Hallmark)
2024	Deck the Halls on Cherry Lane	Matt	Television film (Hallmark)
2024	Homestead: The Series	Tom Reynolds	2 episodes
2025	There's No Place Like Christmas	Luke Davies	Television film (GAF)
2026	Shrinking	Casey	Episode: Happiness Mission
2026	The Christmas Yes List	James	Television film(GAF)
