= Stephen Tobolowsky's Birthday Party =

- Stephen Tobolowsky's Birthday Party
- Directed by: Robert Brinkmann
- Starring: Stephen Tobolowsky
- Release date: February 10, 2005 (US Comedy Arts Festival)
- Running time: 87 minutes
- Country: United States
- Language: English

Stephen Tobolowsky's Birthday Party is a 2005 documentary film about character actor Stephen Tobolowsky in which he tells stories from his life. The actor, who is usually in a supporting role, takes center stage in the 87-minute birthday party.

== Plot ==
The film opens on a beach in Malibu, where Tobolowsky recounts a miraculous swim he took on an earlier birthday. It continues in the kitchen of his home, as he boils sausages for his guests and recounts stories about his early auditions in Los Angeles. After some stories in the backyard, where he is grilling the sausages, the guests arrive. Then Stephen entertains his guests with stories about being nominated as one of 100 coolest people in LA, being in a rock 'n' roll band, and working on such films as Bird on a Wire and Mississippi Burning.

The film ends in the dark of night with a few leftover guests in his candlelit backyard and a tribute to his close friend Bob Darnell. Among the guests at the party are the actors Mena Suvari, Amy Adams, and his wife, Ann Hearn.

== Technical ==
Stephen Tobolowsky's Birthday Party was shot with Clairmont Camera modified Sony F900/3 cameras in HD, edited on a Dual G5 Apple computer and finished in HD at Sunset Digital in Los Angeles. It was produced, directed and shot by Robert Brinkmann. Andrew Putschoegl was the co-producer. The film was edited by Andrew Putschoegl and Robert Brinkmann. Stephen Tobolowsky performs the music.

== History ==
Stephen Tobolowsky's Birthday Party premiered at the U.S. Comedy Arts Festival in Aspen in 2005. It was shown at festivals all over the world, including the World Film Festival in Montreal, Raindance Film Festival in London, SXSW in Austin, Cinequest in San Jose, the Milwaukee International Film Festival, RiverRun, Atlanta, San Francisco, Jacksonville and many more. It won the Deffie Award for Best Documentary from the HD Fest film festival in December 2005. The DVD was released on May 30, 2006, which is also Stephen Tobolowsky's 55th birthday.

== Reception ==
On review aggregator website Rotten Tomatoes, the film holds an approval rating of 100% based on 12 reviews, with an average rating of 8.1/10.
