= A Whole New Ballgame =

- Created by: John Peaslee; Judd Pillot
- Starring: Corbin Bernsen; Julia Campbell; Richard Kind; John O'Hurley
- Country of origin: United States
- Original language: English
- No. of seasons: 1
- No. of episodes: 11 (4 unaired)

Production
- Running time: 30 minutes
- Production companies: Bungalow 78 Productions; Universal Television

Original release
- Network: ABC
- Release: January 9 – March 13, 1995

A Whole New Ballgame is an American sitcom that aired on ABC on Mondays at 8:30 pm from January 9, 1995, to March 13, 1995. It replaced Blue Skies, a sitcom from the same creators, which featured several of the same actors and aired in the same timeslot in the fall.

== Premise ==
The series centered on Brent Sooner, an egotistical baseball player sidelined by the 1994–95 Major League Baseball strike, who became a sportscaster for TV station WPLP in Milwaukee. Also shown were station manager Meg O'Donnell, weatherman Dr. Warner Bakerfield, anchorman Tad Sherman, and sales manager Dwight King.

== Cast ==
- Corbin Bernsen as Brett Sooner
- Julia Campbell as Meg O'Donnell
- Richard Kind as Dwight King
- Stephen Tobolowsky as Dr. Warner Bakerfield
- John O'Hurley as Tad Sherman

== Episodes ==
No.	Title	Directed by	Written by	Original release date	Prod. code	Viewers (millions)
1	"Opening Day"	Barry Kemp	John Peaslee & Judd Pillot	January 9, 1995	70501	16.5
2	"They Say It's Yer Birthday"	Barry Kemp	John Peaslee & Judd Pillot	January 16, 1995	70502	11.9
3	"You Are What You Date"	Rod Daniel	Ric Swartzlander	January 23, 1995	70503	12.3
4	"Brett's Beef"	Rod Daniel	Cindy Chupack & Ellen Sandler	February 13, 1995	70505	10.0
5	"Horace Morgan Is Dead and Living in Milwaukee"	Rod Daniel	John Peaslee & Judd Pillot	February 20, 1995	70504	8.9
6	"With Brett You Get Eggroll"	Unknown	Unknown	February 27, 1995	70506	9.4
7	"Twisted"	Rob Schiller	John Peaslee & Judd Pillot	March 13, 1995	70512	10.7
8	"The Make Out Movie"	N/A	N/A	Unaired	70507	N/A
9	"The Jumper"	N/A	N/A	Unaired	70508	N/A
10	"The Sexual Superheroine"	N/A	N/A	Unaired	70509	N/A
11	"Trouble Down Under"	N/A	N/A	Unaired	70511	N/A
