= Stephen Tobolowsky =

American actor and writer (born 1951)

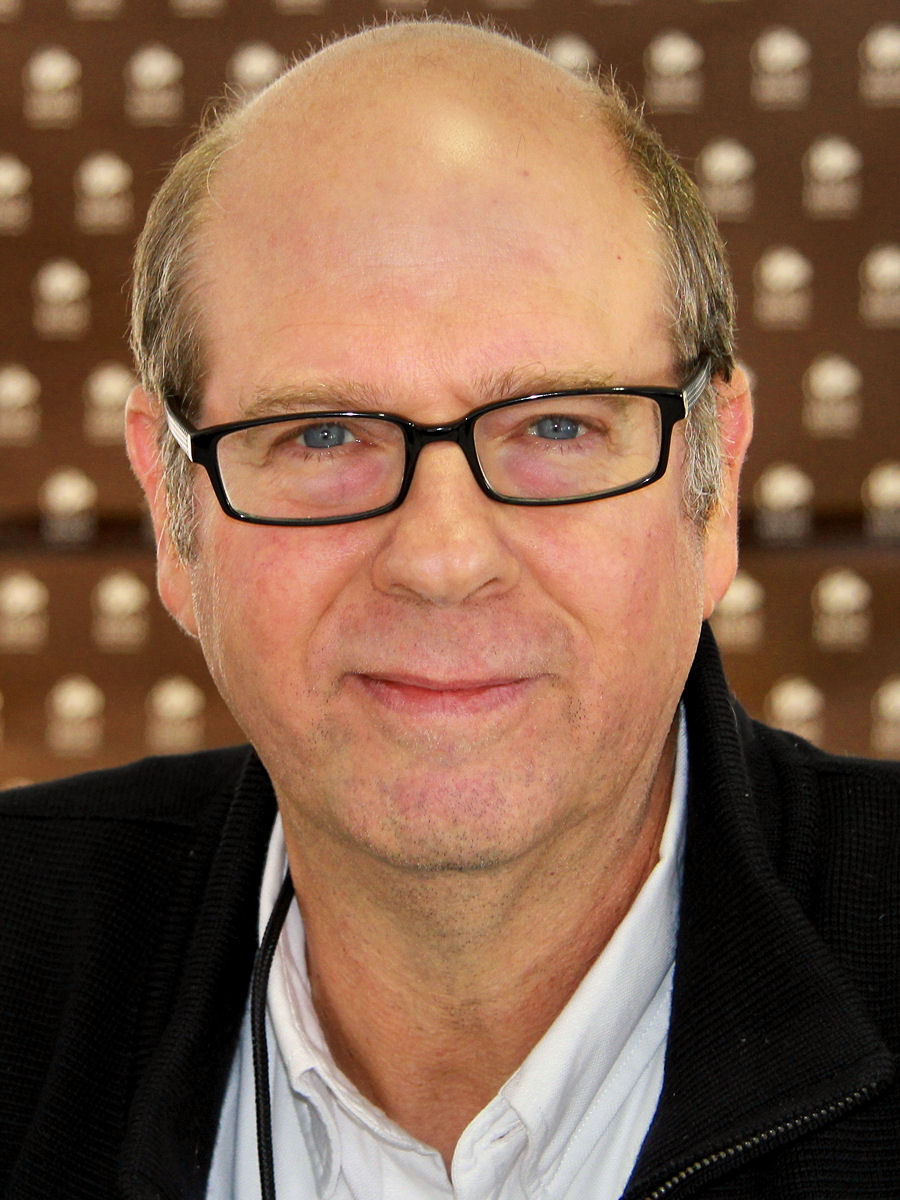
- Tobolowsky at the 2012 Texas Book Festival
- Born: Stephen Harold Tobolowsky; May 30, 1951 (age 75); Dallas, Texas, U.S.
- Education: Southern Methodist University (BFA); University of Illinois, Urbana-Champaign (MFA)
- Occupations: Actor; writer
- Years active: 1975−present
- Spouse: Ann Hearn (m. 1988)
- Children: 2
- Website: stephentobolowsky.com

Stephen Harold Tobolowsky (born May 30, 1951) is an American character actor and writer. He is known for film roles such as insurance agent Ned Ryerson in Groundhog Day and amnesiac Sammy Jankis in Memento, as well as such television characters as Commissioner Hugo Jarry in Deadwood, Bob Bishop in Heroes, Sandy Ryerson in Glee, Stu Beggs in Californication and White Famous, "Action" Jack Barker in Silicon Valley, Dr. Leslie Berkowitz in One Day at a Time, Principal Earl Ball in The Goldbergs, and Dr. Schulman in The Mindy Project.

Tobolowsky has a monthly audio podcast, The Tobolowsky Files, of autobiographical stories of his acting and personal life. He has also authored three books: The Dangerous Animals Club, Cautionary Tales, and My Adventures with God.

== Early life and education ==
Tobolowsky was born on May 30, 1951, in Dallas. He and his family are of Russian Jewish descent. Tobolowsky grew up creating imaginative games with his brother, and his story The Dangerous Animals Club paints a picture of how unsupervised children in the 20th century could amuse themselves. He showed talent at baseball, but a serious childhood illness ended his career as an athlete before it began. He graduated from Justin F. Kimball High School and Southern Methodist University. He received a master's degree from the University of Illinois in 1975.

Tobolowsky is a cousin of Dallas attorney Ira Tobolowsky, who was murdered in his home in 2016 by a disgruntled former litigant. George Tobolowsky, Ira's brother and Stephen's cousin, is a sculptor.

Stephen Tobolowsky also played in a band called A Cast of Thousands, which had two songs, "Red, White and Blue" and "I Heard a Voice Last Night", on a compilation of local Dallas bands called A New Hi. Both of these songs featured Steve Vaughan on guitar, who would be later known as Stevie Ray Vaughan.

== Career ==
Tobolowsky has appeared in over 200 films, plus many television projects. He has also worked in the theater, directing and acting in plays in New York City, San Francisco and Los Angeles. He directed one film, Two Idiots in Hollywood, based on his play of the same name. He also co-wrote the film True Stories with David Byrne and Beth Henley. While writing True Stories, he told Byrne about his supposed psychic abilities, which inspired Byrne to write the song "Radio Head" for the film. Tobolowsky was nominated for a Tony Award for Best Performance by a Featured Actor in a Play for the 2002 revival of Morning's at Seven.

On October 29, 2009, Tobolowsky started a new podcast on /Film called The Tobolowsky Files, where he tells stories, in a similar fashion to Stephen Tobolowsky's Birthday Party (2005). The show was picked up by Public Radio International in 2012.

== Filmography ==
=== Film ===
| Year | Title | Role | Notes |
|---|---|---|---|
| 1977 | Keep My Grave Open | Robert | |
| 1984 | The Philadelphia Experiment | Barney | |
| 1984 | Swing Shift | French deMille, Documentary Narrator | |
| 1986 | Nobody's Fool | Kirk | |
| 1987 | Spaceballs | Captain of the Guard | |
| 1988 | Mississippi Burning | Clayton Townley | |
| 1988 | Two Idiots in Hollywood | Prosecuting Attorney | Also writer and director |
| 1989 | Checking Out | Pharmacist | |
| 1989 | Breaking In | District Attorney | |
| 1989 | Great Balls of Fire! | Jud Phillips | |
| 1989 | In Country | Pete | |
| 1990 | Bird on a Wire | Joe Weyburn | |
| 1990 | Funny About Love | Hugo | |
| 1990 | Welcome Home, Roxy Carmichael | Mayor Bill Klepler | Credited as Stephen Tobolowski |
| 1990 | The Grifters | Jeweler | |
| 1990 | Mirror, Mirror | Mr. Anderson | |
| 1991 | Wedlock | Warden Holliday | |
| 1991 | Thelma & Louise | Max | |
| 1992 | Basic Instinct | Dr. Lamott | |
| 1992 | Where the Day Takes You | Charles | |
| 1992 | Hero | Wallace | |
| 1992 | Memoirs of an Invisible Man | Warren Singleton | |
| 1992 | Single White Female | Mitchell Myerson | |
| 1992 | Roadside Prophets | Ranger Bob | |
| 1992 | Sneakers | Dr. Werner Brandes | |
| 1993 | Josh and S.A.M. | Thom Whitney | |
| 1993 | Calendar Girl | Antonio Gallo | |
| 1993 | The Pickle | Mike Krakower | |
| 1993 | Groundhog Day | Ned Ryerson | |
| 1994 | Trevor | Father Jon | |
| 1994 | My Father the Hero | Mike | |
| 1994 | Radioland Murders | Max Applewhite | |
| 1995 | Dr. Jekyll and Ms. Hyde | Oliver Mintz | |
| 1995 | Murder in the First | Mr. Henkin | |
| 1996 | The Glimmer Man | Christopher Maynard | |
| 1996 | Power 98 | Rick Harris | |
| 1996 | Homeward Bound II: Lost in San Francisco | Bando (voice) | |
| 1997 | Boys Life 2 | Father John | |
| 1997 | The Curse of Inferno | Lonnie Martin | |
| 1997 | Mr. Magoo | Agent Chuck Stupak | |
| 1998 | An Alan Smithee Film: Burn Hollywood Burn | Bill Bardo | |
| 1998 | Black Dog | McClaren | |
| 1998 | The Jungle Book: Mowgli's Story | Tabaqui (voice) | |
| 1998 | Around the Fire | Doc | |
| 1998 | The Brave Little Toaster Goes to Mars | Calculator (voice) | Credited as Stephen Tobolowski |
| 1999 | The Insider | Eric Kluster | |
| 1999 | One Man's Hero | Captain Gaine | |
| 2000 | Sleep Easy, Hutch Rimes | Dewey Wise | |
| 2000 | Bossa Nova | Trevor | |
| 2000 | The Operator | Doc | |
| 2000 | Memento | Sammy Jankis | |
| 2000 | Stanley's Gig | Abe Cohen | |
| 2001 | The Prime Gig | Mick | |
| 2001 | Freddy Got Fingered | Uncle Neil | Uncredited |
| 2002 | Love Liza | Tom Bailey | |
| 2002 | The Country Bears | Norbert Barrington | |
| 2002 | Ritual | Dr. Javitz | Uncredited |
| 2003 | National Security | Billy Narthax | |
| 2003 | View from the Top | Frank Thomas | Uncredited |
| 2003 | Freaky Friday | Mr. Elton Bates | |
| 2003 | Frankie and Johnny Are Married | Murray Mintz | |
| 2004 | Win a Date with Tad Hamilton! | George Ruddy | |
| 2004 | Garfield | Happy Chapman / Walter J. Chapman | |
| 2004 | Little Black Book | Carl | |
| 2004 | Debating Robert Lee | Debate Judge | |
| 2005 | Miss Congeniality 2: Armed and Fabulous | Tom Abernathy | |
| 2005 | Robots | Bigmouth Executive, Forge (voice) | |
| 2005 | Stephen Tobolowsky's Birthday Party | Himself | |
| 2005 | Living 'til the End | Dr. Shaw | |
| 2006 | The Sasquatch Gang | Ernie Dalrymple | |
| 2006 | Failure to Launch | Bud | |
| 2006 | Pope Dreams | Carl Venable | |
| 2006 | Blind Dating | Dr. Perkins | |
| 2006 | National Lampoon's Totally Baked: A Potumentary | Jesco Rollins | |
| 2007 | Wild Hogs | Charley | |
| 2007 | Boxboarders! | Dr. Stephen James | |
| 2007 | Loveless in Los Angeles | Jon | |
| 2008 | The Rainbow Tribe | Principal Sands | |
| 2008 | Beethoven's Big Break | Sal DeMarco | Video |
| 2009 | The Time Traveler's Wife | Dr. Kendrick | |
| 2010 | Buried | Alan Davenport (voice) | |
| 2010 | Hard Breakers | Ephraim | |
| 2010 | Peep World | Ephraim | |
| 2011 | You May Not Kiss the Bride | Plumber | |
| 2011 | The Last Ride | Ray | |
| 2012 | A Little Something on the Side | Larry | Short |
| 2012 | The Lorax | Uncle Ubb (voice) | |
| 2012 | Pearblossom Hwy | Rick Lawler | |
| 2014 | The Barber | Chief Gary Hardaway | |
| 2014 | Mr. Peabody & Sherman | Principal Purdy (voice) | |
| 2014 | Atlas Shrugged: Part III | Dr. Hugh Akston | |
| 2014 | Christian Mingle | Douglas McCarver | |
| 2015 | Hollywood Adventures | Wronald Wright | |
| 2016 | Welcome to the Men's Group | Carl | |
| 2016 | Six LA Love Stories | Professor John Dobler | |
| 2016 | The Confirmation | Father Lyons | |
| 2016 | Guys and Girls Can't Be Friends | Andy | |
| 2017 | Scooby-Doo! Shaggy's Showdown | Andy Gunderson (voice) | |
| 2017 | Mamaboy | Reverend Weld | |
| 2018 | Strange Nature | Mayor Paulson | |
| 2018 | Monsters At Large | Mr. Phillips | |
| 2019 | Fractured | Dr. Berthram | |
| 2023 | Candy Cane Lane | Mr. Benedetto | |
| 2023 | Poolman | Stephen Toronkowski/Blanche | |
| 2025 | Freakier Friday | Mr. Elton Bates | |
| 2025 | Mimics | | |
| 2026 | Freaks Part II | | |

=== Television ===
| Year | Title | Role | Notes |
|---|---|---|---|
| 1983 | Cocaine and Blue Eyes | TV Clerk | Television film |
| 1985 | Alice | Caveman Carl | Episode: "Vera, the Nightbird" |
| 1985 | Knots Landing | Steve Comiskey | Episode: "A Man of Good Will" |
| 1985 | Falcon Crest | Doctor | Episode: "The Phoenix" |
| 1985 | Cagney & Lacey | Russell Phelps | Episode: "Ordinary Hero" |
| 1985 | Stir Crazy | Salesman | Episode: "Where's Mary?" |
| 1985 | Crazy Like a Fox | Hotel Clerk | Episode: "Sunday in the Park with Harry" |
| 1986 | Designing Women | Boyd | Episode: "Design House" |
| 1986 | 227 | Professor | Episode: "We the People" |
| 1987 | The Days and Nights of Molly Dodd | Alex | Episode: "Here's Why You Should Never Wear High Heels to the Bank" |
| 1989 | Roe vs. Wade | Darryl Horwath | Television film |
| 1989 | L.A. Law | Dr. Michael Segal | Episode: "Lie Down and Deliver" |
| 1989 | Lifestories | Josh Gant | Episode: "Art Conforti" |
| 1990 | Last Flight Out | Doctor Timothy Brandon | Television film |
| 1991 | Seinfeld | Tor | Episode: "The Heart Attack" |
| 1991 | Tagget | Al Hentz | Television film |
| 1991 | Down Home | Honis | Episode: "Mail Order Tran" |
| 1991 | Baby Talk | Dr. Ezra Farr | Episode: "The Whiz Kid" |
| 1991 | The Marla Hanson Story | Defense Attorney | Television film |
| 1991 | Deadly Medicine | Ron Sutton | Television film |
| 1991 | Perry Mason: The Case of the Maligned Mobster | Sergeant Phil Baranski | Television film |
| 1993 | Picket Fences | Ben Sasha | Episode: "Be My Valentine" |
| 1993 | Civil Wars | Eugene Paxton | Episode: "A Liver Runs Through It" |
| 1993 | When Love Kills: The Seduction of John Hearn | Detective Keefe | Television film |
| 1993 | Café Americain | Roger | Episode: "Toast of the Town" |
| 1993 | Against the Grain | Niles Hardeman | Recurring role |
| 1994 | Harts of the West | Dave's former boss | Episode: "Back in the Panties Again" |
| 1994 | Blue Skies | Oak | Main role |
| 1995 | Dweebs | Karl | Main role |
| 1995 | A Whole New Ballgame | Dr. Warner Brakefield | 2 episodes |
| 1995 | Chicago Hope | Dr. Ted Joseph | 2 episodes |
| 1996 | The Home Court | Jeffrey Solomon | Episode: "Touched by an Anger" |
| 1996 | The Pretender | Dr. Alan Trader | Episode: "Pilot" |
| 1996 | Night Visitors | Taylor | Television film |
| 1996 | Buffy the Vampire Slayer | Principal Flutie | Unaired pilot |
| 1996–1997 | Mr. Rhodes | Ray Heary | Main role |
| 1997 | The Drew Carey Show | The Councilman | Episode: "The Dog and Pony Show" |
| 1997 | The Naked Truth | Vincent Hartford | Episode: "The Birds" |
| 1997 | Murder One | Dr. Andross | 3 episodes |
| 1997 | Promised Land | Fred Argyle | Episode: "Par for the Course" |
| 1998 | The Closer | Phil | Episode: "Morality Bites" |
| 1998 | Hercules | Numericles (voice) | Episode: "Hercules and the Techno Greeks" |
| 1998 | Suddenly Susan | Dr. Gerken | Episode: "Don't Tell" |
| 1998 | Vengeance Unlimited | Mayor Bob Laird | Episode: "Eden" |
| 1998–2000 | Any Day Now | Mr. Brinkman | 2 episodes |
| 1999 | Mad About You | Principal Hocksacker | Episode: "Uncle Phil Goes Back to High School" |
| 1999 | The Practice | Clyde Burrows | Episode: "Closet Justice" |
| 1999 | Don't Look Under the Bed | Michael McCausland | Television film |
| 1999 | That '70s Show | The Professor | Episode: "Laurie and the Professor" |
| 1999 | Two Guys and a Girl | Father Viteri | Episode: "Berg's New Roommate" |
| 1999 | Odd Man Out | Alan Carlson | Episode: "In the Name of the Father" |
| 1999 | Snoops | Michael Bench | 3 episodes |
| 2000 | Manhattan, AZ | Dr. Bob | Recurring role |
| 2000 | Alien Fury: Countdown to Invasion | B.J. McQueen | Television film |
| 2000 | Buzz Lightyear of Star Command | Gil (voice) | Episode: "Mindwarp" |
| 2000 | That's Life | Study Advisor Roger Robinson | Episode: "The Screw-Up" |
| 2001 | Roswell | Julius Walters | Episode: "Secrets and Lies" |
| 2001 | Bull | Mr. Siegel | Episode: "Blood, Flopsweat and Tears" |
| 2001 | King of the Hill | Dr. Benson, Burt Halverstrom (voice) | Episode: "The Exterminator" |
| 2001 | Off Centre | Milt Flack | Episode: "Swing Time" |
| 2001 | The Day the World Ended | Principal Ed Turner | Television film |
| 2001 | The Lone Gunmen | Adam Burgess | Episode: "Madam, I'm Adam" |
| 2001 | Black River | Mayor Tom Thompson | Television film |
| 2002 | Malcolm in the Middle | Mr. Fisher | Episode: "Lois' Makeover" |
| 2002 | Law & Order: Criminal Intent | Jim Halliwell | Episode: "Malignant" |
| 2002 | Do Over | Mr. Meyers | Episode: "The Block Party" |
| 2003 | Las Vegas | Donny Rollins | Episode: "Donny, We Hardly Knew Ye" |
| 2003 | Kingpin | Dr. Klein's lawyer | Episode: "Black Magic Woman" |
| 2003 | Oliver Beene | Ringmaster Bob | Episode: "Divorce-o-Rama" |
| 2003 | The Dead Zone | Dr. Jim Pratt | Episode: "Plague" |
| 2003–2005 | CSI: Miami | Assistant State Attorney Don Haffman | Recurring role |
| 2004 | Will and Grace | Ned Weathers | Episode: "Company" |
| 2004 | It's All Relative | Roy | Episode: "Philip in a China Shop" |
| 2004 | The West Wing | Dr. Max Milkman | Episode: "The Stormy Present" |
| 2004 | Complete Savages | Mr. Frehley | Episode: "Voodude" |
| 2004 | Married to the Kellys | Henry Conway | Episode: "Talk Radio" |
| 2004 | According to Jim | Dr. Ted | Episode: "The Marriage Bank" |
| 2005 | American Dragon: Jake Long | Stan Lipkowski (voice) | 2 episodes |
| 2005 | McBride: The Doctor Is Out... Really Out | Harry Evers | Television film |
| 2005 | Curb Your Enthusiasm | Len Dunkel | Episode: "The Seder" |
| 2005 | The Closer | James Bloom | Episode: "The Butler Did It" |
| 2005 | Reba | Judge | Episode: "Grannies Gone Wild" |
| 2005–2006 | Deadwood | Hugo Jarry | Recurring role |
| 2006 | Ghost Whisperer | Dr. Edward | Episode: "Dead Man's Ridge" |
| 2006 | Night Stalker | Titus Berry | Episode: "Timeless" |
| 2006 | Desperate Housewives | Bud Penrod | Episode: "No One Is Alone" |
| 2006–2007 | Big Day | The Garf | Recurring role |
| 2007 | John From Cincinnati | Mark Lewinsky | 3 episodes |
| 2007 | Entourage | Mayor of Beverly Hills | Episode: "Sorry, Harvey" |
| 2007 | Boston Legal | Dr. Alvin Azinabinacroft | Episode: "The Good Lawyer" |
| 2007 | Studio 60 on the Sunset Strip | Joe | Episode: "The Friday Night Slaughter" |
| 2007 | The Valley of Light | Littleberry Davis | Television film |
| 2007 | Raines | Wally Anderson | Episode: "Stone Dead" |
| 2007–2008 | Heroes | Bob Bishop | Recurring role |
| 2008 | CSI: Crime Scene Investigation | Spencer Freiberg | Episode: "Two and a Half Deaths" |
| 2008 | Rita Rocks | Bill Bowman | Episode: "Get Off Off of My Cloud" |
| 2009 | The New Adventures of Old Christine | Principal James Merrow | 2 episodes |
| 2009–2011 | Glee | Sandy Ryerson | Recurring role |
| 2010 | The Sarah Silverman Program | Bill Fantastimart | Episode: "A Fairly Attractive Mind" |
| 2010 | True Jackson, VP | Lars Balthazar | Episode: "Saving Snackleberry" |
| 2010 | Law & Order: Special Victims Unit | Edwin Adelson | Episode: "Bullseye" |
| 2011 | Community | Professor Peter Sheffield | Episode: "Competitive Wine Tasting" |
| 2011 | The Defenders | Judge Gelineau | Episode: "Nevada v. Wayne" |
| 2011 | Pound Puppies | Mr. Geekman (voice) | Episode: "Taboo" |
| 2011–2014 | Californication | Stu Beggs | Main role |
| 2012 | Work It | Dr. David Deutsch | Episode: "Shake Your Moneymaker" |
| 2012–2013 | Justified | FBI Agent Jerry Barkley | 3 episodes |
| 2012–2016 | The Mindy Project | Marc Shulman | 4 episodes |
| 2013 | Toy Story of Terror! | Ron the Hotel Manager (voice) | Television film |
| 2014–2023 | The Goldbergs | Principal Earl Ball | Recurring role |
| 2014 | Friends with Better Lives | Dr. Adleman | Episode: "Game Sext Match" |
| 2014 | Hello Ladies: The Movie | Alan | Television film |
| 2014 | The Hotwives | Phil | Recurring role |
| 2015 | Big Time in Hollywood, FL | Alan Dolfe | Main role |
| 2015 | Dr. Ken | Joe | Episode: "Pilot" |
| 2015 | Another Period | Thomas Edison | Episode: "Rejects Beach" |
| 2016 | Fuller House | Mr. Gerald | Episode: "The Not-So-Great Escape" |
| 2016 | Blunt Talk | Daniel Rudolph | Episode: "Walter Has to Look After Walter" |
| 2016–2017 | Silicon Valley | Jack Barker | 13 episodes |
| 2016–2017 | Justice League Action | Martin Stein (voice) | Recurring role (10 episodes) |
| 2017–2020 | One Day at a Time | Dr. Berkowitz | Main role |
| 2017–present | The Loud House | Principal Wilbur T. Huggins (voice) | Recurring role |
| 2017 | White Famous | Stu Beggs | 3 episodes |
| 2017 | We Bare Bears | Stephen (voice) | Episode: "Tubin" |
| 2018 | DIY | Mister Wonderworm (voice) | Television film |
| 2018 | Law & Order: Special Victims Unit | Defense Attorney Kayman | Episode: "The Good Girl” |
| 2019 | Schooled | Earl Ball | Recurring role |
| 2019 | The Cool Kids | Leonard | Episode: "Margaret Ups Her Game” |
| 2019 | Live in Front of a Studio Audience | Harry Bentley | Episode: "Norman Lear's All in the Family and The Jeffersons" |
| 2019 | Green Eggs and Ham | Chad (voice) | Episode: "House" |
| 2019 | The Epic Tales of Captain Underpants | Creepy Rattlechains (voice) | Episode: "The Spooky Tale of Captain Underpants Hack-a-Ween" |
| 2019–2022 | Puppy Dog Pals | Chip (voice) | 2 episodes |
| 2020 | ThunderCats Roar | Driller (voice) | Episode: "Driller" |
| 2020–2021 | Archer | Robert (voice) | 8 episodes |
| 2022 | Grace and Frankie | Allen | Episode: "The Horrible Family" |
| 2022 | Haul Out the Holly | Ned | Television film (Hallmark) |
| 2023 | Lopez vs Lopez | Sam Van Bryan | Recurring role |
| 2023 | The Really Loud House | Walter Phillipini | 2 episodes |
| 2023 | Animaniacs | Local DJ (voice) | 2 episodes |
| 2023 | Haul Out the Holly: Lit Up | Ned | Television film (Hallmark) |
| 2024 | Nobody Wants This | Rabbi Cohen | Recurring role |
| 2024 | Lopez vs Lopez | Sam Van Bryan | Episode: "Lopez vs In-Laws" |
| 2024 | The Madness | Don Sloss Sr. | Episode: "Discord" |
| 2024 | Hacks | Henry Weeks | Episode: "Join the Club" |
| 2025 | Iron Man and His Awesome Friends | Spencer Q. Sweets (voice) | 2 episodes |
| 2025 | Haul Out the Holloween | Ned | Television film (Hallmark) |
| 2025 | The Simpsons | Merle (voice) | Episode: "Aunt Misbehavin'" |

=== Video games ===
| Year | Title | Role | Notes |
|---|---|---|---|
| 2013 | Batman: Arkham Origins | Ferris Boyle | Cold, Cold Heart DLC |
| 2024 | Batman: Arkham Shadow | Ferris Boyle | |

== Discography ==
- Featured on two tracks of the 1971 compilation album A New Hi
- Featured on the track "Loser" (also released as a digital single) of the 2010 cast album Glee: The Music, Volume 3 Showstoppers
- Featured on the tracks "Loser" and "I Wanna Sex You Up" of the 2010 compilation downloadable cast album Glee: The Music, The Complete Season One

== Stage appearances ==
Selected stage appearances

| Year | Title | Venue | Role | Notes |
|---|---|---|---|---|
| 1976 | Meredith Monk Dance Company's Paris | Royce Hall | Man with a clipboard | |
| 1982 | Beth Henley's The Wake of Jamie Foster | Eugene O'Neill Theatre | Leon | |
| 1985 | Chekhov's The Three Sisters | Los Angeles Theatre Center | Baron Tuzenbach | |
| 1986 | Michel de Ghelderode's Barabbus | Los Angeles Theatre Center | Pontius Pilate and The Watcher | |
| 1987 | Tennessee Williams' The Glass Menagerie | Los Angeles Theatre Center | Gentleman caller | |
| 1989 | Christopher Durang's The Marriage of Bette and Boo | Los Angeles Theatre Center | Father Donnally and The Doctor | |
| 2002 | Paul Osborn's Mornings at Seven | Lyceum Theater and Ahmanson Theatre | Homer | |
| 2002 | Shaw's Heartbreak House | Theater 40 | Capt. Shotover | |
| 2003 | Sally Nemeth's Holy Days | Theater 40 | Gant | |
| 2019 | Angela J. Davis' The Spanish Prayer Book | Road Theater Los Angeles | Alexander | |

== Writing credits ==
| Year | Title | Notes |
|---|---|---|
| 1984 | Two Idiots in Hollywood | Stage play and film |
| 1986 | True Stories | Film |

== Directing credits ==
| Year | Title | Notes |
|---|---|---|
| 1984 | Two Idiots in Hollywood | Stage play at Theatre Los Angeles |
| 1984 | Beth Henley's The Miss Firecracker Contest | Stage play at Manhattan Theatre Club |
| 1987 | Beth Henley's The Lucky Spot | Film |
| 1988 | Two Idiots in Hollywood | Film |
| 2003 | Jim McLure's Blue Silence | Stage play at Theater 40 |
