= My Adventures with God =

2017 memoir by Stephen Tobolowsky

- First edition
- Author: Stephen Tobolowsky
- Genre: Memoir
- Publisher: Simon & Schuster
- Publication date: April 18, 2017
- Pages: 368
- ISBN: 9781476766461

My Adventures with God is a 2017 memoir by Stephen Tobolowsky. Kirkus Reviews said the first half of the book was "an uneven Hollywood memoir" prior to Tobolowsky's "sudden return to traditional Judaism" in the 1990s, when the work "gains more gravity". Publishers Weekly called it a "well told must-read" with stories based in Tobolowsky's Jewish Texan identity and a "unique Pentateuch narrative arc" of his life. A positive Jewish Book Council review said that it displayed "friendly scholarship, serious intent, and occasional desperation of an exemplary seeker" with "light doses of Torah and Talmud". The memoir also covers Tobolowsky's "somewhat un-Jewish upbringing in Dallas — he went to Sunday school throughout most of his childhood, sometimes more than once per week".
