= Zale Parry =

American scuba diver, photographer and actress (1933–2026)

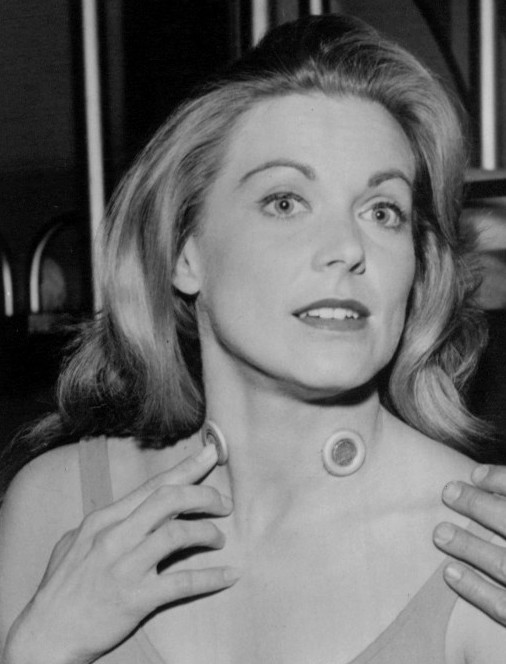
- Parry as a guest star on Voyage to the Bottom of the Sea, 1965
- Born: March 19, 1933; Milwaukee, Wisconsin, U.S.
- Died: July 20, 2026 (aged 93); Tillamook, Oregon, U.S.
- Occupation: Actress
- Spouse: Parry Bivens (m. 1955; died 1963) Robert Neuman (m. 1963, divorced)
- Children: 1

Rosalia "Zale" Parry (March 19, 1933 – July 20, 2026) was an American pioneer scuba diver, underwater photographer and actress. She has been described as "California's underwater queen without a rival in sight".

== Early life and education ==
Parry was born in Milwaukee, Wisconsin, on March 19, 1933, as one of seven children. She learned to swim at an early age to avoid "being perpetually dunked" by her siblings. Growing up near Pewaukee Lake west of Milwaukee, she was skin diving there without mask or fins by the time she was eight years old. When she was in the ninth grade she joined a Florida water show, and for three years she toured with the show through the Midwestern United States. She was a swimming champion and studied dramatics at UCLA.

== Diving ==
As a young woman, while working in Santa Monica, California, for the Douglas Aircraft Company, after meeting co-worker (and future husband) Parry Bivens, Zale Parry became involved in pioneering diving and scientific work as reported in a 1955 issue of Sports Illustrated magazine.

In 1954, Parry set a women's depth record to 209 feet, exceeding the previous record of 80 feet.

== Acting ==
In 1954, Parry made her screen debut in the television series Kingdom of the Sea, a Jack Douglas production. She appeared in 78 episodes of the series. Because of her work in Kingdom of the Sea, Parry was tapped by the producers of the new show, Sea Hunt. Parry referred to Sea Hunt as an "underwater western". She often played a damsel in distress in the series's episodes. Offscreen she gave the show's star, Lloyd Bridges, instruction in diving techniques.

Parry's acting continued on other shows, including GE Theatre, Wagon Train, Voyage to the Bottom of the Sea, Peter Gunn, and The Magic Circus. Parry continued as an actor for a number of years including many commercials and as a stunt woman on a wide variety of shows involving underwater scenes. By 1967, Parry's TV work was primarily in commercials.

Parry doubled for Sophia Loren in the film Boy on a Dolphin (1957). In 2006 she was in the film Tillamook Treasure, in which she played Sam, the owner of a hardware store.

== Offices and recognition ==
Parry was a member of the board of directors of the Underwater Photographic Society. She later became the society's president. She was co-director of the International Underwater Film Festival.

She was featured on the cover of the May 23, 1955 issue of Sports Illustrated magazine, and she received the 1960 Water Sports Championship Award from Argosy magazine.

== Personal life and death ==
Parry married Parry Bivens, and she worked as a secretary while he was in medical school. They had a daughter. Parry and Bivens participated in an early research study on the effects of LSD by psychiatrist Oscar Janiger. According to an LA Weekly article, Parry "credit[ed] LSD with helping her to appreciate the intricacies and interconnectedness and beauty of life in the 'underwater world'". After Bivens's 1963 death, Parry married air ambulance pilot Robert Neumann. The marriage ended in divorce.

Parry died at her home in Tillamook, Oregon, on July 20, 2026, at the age of 93.
