= Blue Skies (1994 TV series) =

- Created by: John Peaslee; Judd Pillot
- Starring: Matt Roth; Julia Campbell; Corey Parker
- Composer: Jonathan Wolff
- Country of origin: United States
- Original language: English
- No. of seasons: 1
- No. of episodes: 8 (1 unaired) (list of episodes)

Production
- Camera setup: Multi-camera
- Running time: 30 minutes
- Production companies: Bungalow 78 Productions; Universal Television

Original release
- Network: ABC
- Release: September 12 – October 24, 1994

Blue Skies is an American sitcom that aired from September 12, 1994 to October 24, 1994.

The show aired Monday nights at 8:30pm on ABC. Three months after it was canceled, another sitcom by the same creators (John Peaslee and Judd Pillot) and featuring several of the same cast members (Julia Campbell, Richard Kind and Stephen Tobolowsky), A Whole New Ballgame, aired in the same timeslot.

== Premise ==
Two guys operate the Blue Skies Trading Company, a mail-order business in Boston.

== Cast ==
- Matt Roth as Russell Evans
- Corey Parker as Joel Goodman
- Julia Campbell as Ellie Baskin
- Stephen Tobolowsky as Oak
- Richard Kind as Kenny
- Adilah Barnes as Eve Munroe

== Episodes ==
| No. | Title | Directed by | Written by | Original release date | Prod. code | Viewers (millions) |
|---|---|---|---|---|---|---|
| 1 | "A Partner Changes Everything" | Rob Schiller | John Peaslee and Judd Pillot | September 12, 1994 | 69907 | 11.7 |
The accountant for the mail-order company has run off with the money.
| 2 | "Kenny Returns" | Rob Schiller | John Peaslee and Judd Pillot | September 19, 1994 | 69901 | 10.2 |
Kenny goes back to work for the company as part of a work release program after he stole the money.
| 3 | "Quick and Alone" | Rob Schiller | Ric Swartzlander | September 26, 1994 | 69904 | 9.1 |
Russell must find a way to make Karen break up with him.
| 4 | "A Hatful of Pain" | Rob Schiller | Mark Ganzel | October 3, 1994 | 69906 | 10.4 |
When a famous rock star starts wearing a hat from the company, the company struggles to keep up with the orders.
| 5 | "If You Knew Daddy Like I Know Daddy" | Rob Schiller | John Peaslee, Judd Pillot and Joseph Staretski | October 10, 1994 | 69905 | 10.8 |
Ellie's dad offer her a job as senior vice president of his New York company.
| 6 | "Cat's In the Bag" | Rob Schiller | Lori Kirkland | October 17, 1994 | 69903 | 11.1 |
The company starts sponsoring a female volleyball team.
| 7 | "A Kiss Is Just a Mess" | Rob Schiller | Story by : Christopher Vane; Teleplay by : John Peaslee & Judd Pillot | October 24, 1994 | 69902 | 11.0 |
Both brothers want to date Ellie.
| 8 | "The Girl, the Bull and the Amenite Hat" | Rob Schiller | Ric Swartzlander | Unaired | 69909 | N/A |
A girl who Joel slept with in Spain shows up in Boston looking for him.
