= Floyd Westerman =

American actor and political activist (1936–2007)

Floyd "Red Crow" Westerman
- Kanghi Duta
- Westerman aka Kanghi Duta
- Born: Floyd Westerman; August 17, 1936; Lake Traverse Indian Reservation, South Dakota, U.S.
- Died: December 13, 2007 (aged 71); Cedars-Sinai Medical Center, Los Angeles, California, U.S.
- Resting place: Saint Matthew's Catholic Cemetery, Veblen, South Dakota, U.S.
- Occupations: Actor; artist; musician
- Years active: 1988–2007
- Political party: Independent
- Spouse: Rosie Westerman
- Children: 5

Floyd Westerman (August 17, 1936 – December 13, 2007) was a Sisseton Dakota musician, political activist, and actor. After establishing a career as a country music singer, later in his life he became an actor, usually depicting Native American elders in American films and television. He is also credited as Floyd Red Crow Westerman. As a political activist, he spoke and marched for Native American causes.

== Early life ==
He was born Floyd Westerman on the Lake Traverse Indian Reservation, home of the Sisseton Wahpeton Oyate, a federally recognized tribe that is one of the sub-tribes of the Eastern Dakota section of the Great Sioux Nation, located in the U.S. state of South Dakota. His Indigenous name Kanghi Duta means "Red Crow" in the Dakota language (which is one of the three related Siouan languages of the Great Plains).

At the age of 10, Westerman was sent to the Wahpeton Boarding School, where he first met Dennis Banks (who as an adult became a leader of the American Indian Movement). There Westerman and the other children were forced to cut their traditionally long hair and forbidden to speak their native languages. This experience would profoundly impact Westerman's development and entire life. As an adult, he reclaimed his heritage and became an outspoken advocate for Indigenous cultural preservation.

Westerman graduated from Northern State University with a B.A. degree in secondary education. He served two years in the U.S. Marine Corps, before beginning his career as a country singer.

== Career ==
Before entering films and television, Westerman had established a solid reputation as a country-western music singer. In his songwriting he explored and critiqued the European influences on Native American communities. In addition to several solo recordings, Westerman collaborated with Jackson Browne, Willie Nelson, Bonnie Raitt, Harry Belafonte, Joni Mitchell, Kris Kristofferson, and Buffy Sainte-Marie. In the 1990s, he toured with Sting to raise funds to preserve the endangered rain forests.

After years performing as a singer, Westerman became interested in acting. His film debut was in Renegades (1989), in which he played "Red Crow", the Lakota Sioux father of Hank Storm, played by Lou Diamond Phillips. Additional film roles include "Chief Ten Bears" in Dances with Wolves (1990), and the "shaman" for the singer Jim Morrison in Oliver Stone's The Doors (1991). Westerman appeared as Standing Elk, alongside his long-time friend Max Gail, in the family film, Tillamook Treasure (2006). He appeared in Hidalgo (2004), as Chief Eagle Horn in Buffalo Bill's circus. In September 2007, Westerman finished work for the film Swing Vote (2008).

Television roles included playing "George" on Dharma & Greg, "Uncle Ray" on Walker, Texas Ranger (in the pilot and first regular seasons), "One Who Waits" on Northern Exposure, and multiple appearances as "Albert Hosteen" on The X-Files. Westerman also did numerous Public Service Announcements for television including for the United Nations Earth Summit in Rio in 1992.

== Death ==
Westerman died from complications of leukemia at Cedars-Sinai Medical Center in Los Angeles on December 13, 2007. He was survived by his wife Rosie, four daughters, and a son.

== Selected filmography ==
- Powwow Highway (1989) - CB Radio Voice (voice)
- Renegades (1989) - Red Crow
- Dances with Wolves (1990) - Ten Bears
- The Making of 'Dances with Wolves' (1990) - TV Short documentary - Himself
- Son of the Morning Star (1991, TV Mini-Series) - Sitting Bull
- The Doors (1991) - Shaman
- Clearcut (1991) - Wilf
- The Broken Chain (1993, TV Movie) - Tribe Elder
- Jonathan of the Bears (1994) - Chief Tawanka
- Lakota Woman: Siege at Wounded Knee (1994, TV Movie) - Mary's grandfather
- 500 Nations (1995, TV Mini-Series) - (voice)
- Buffalo Girls (1995, TV Mini-Series) - No Ears
- Dusting Cliff 7 (1997) - Indian Bob
- The Brave (1997) - Papa
- Naturally Native (1998) - Chairman Pico
- Grey Owl (1999) - Pow Wow Chief
- Graduation Night (2003) - Old Man
- Atlantis: Milo's Return (2003) - Chakashi (voice)
- Dreamkeeper (2003, TV Movie) - Iron Spoon
- Hidalgo (2004) - Chief Eagle Horn
- Tillamook Treasure (2006) - Standing Elk
- Comanche Moon (2008, TV Mini-Series) - First Old Comanche
- Swing Vote (2008) - Chief Running Bear (final film role)

== Selected television appearances ==
- MacGyver (1988, TV series) - Two Eagles
- Captain Planet and the Planeteers (1990, TV series) - Indian Chief (voice)
- L.A. Law (1991, TV series) - Judge William Gainser
- Northern Exposure (1991-1993, TV series) - One-Who-Waits
- Murder, She Wrote (1992, TV series) - Uncle Ashie Nakai
- Walker, Texas Ranger (1993-1994, TV series) - Uncle Ray Firewalker; 26 episodes
- 500 Nations (1995, TV Mini-Series) (voice)
- Roseanne (1995, TV series) - Floyd
- The X-Files (1995-1999, TV series) - Albert Hosteen
- The Pretender (1997, TV series) - Ernie Two Feathers
- Baywatch Nights (1997, TV series) - Indian Guide Wahote
- Poltergeist: The Legacy (1997, TV series) - Ezekial
- Millennium (1997, TV series) - Old Indian
- Dharma & Greg (1997-2001, TV series) - George Littlefox
- Judging Amy (2001, TV series) - Mr. Wheeler

== Discography ==
- Custer Died for Your Sins (1969)
- Indian Country (1970)
- Custer Died for Your Sins (re-recording; 1982)
- The Land is Your Mother (1984)
- A Tribute to Johnny Cash (2006)
