= Frankie and Johnny in the Clair de Lune =

1987 play written by Terrence McNally

- Poster for the 1987 Westside Theatre production
- Original language: English
- Written by: Terrence McNally
- Characters: Frankie, a waitress; Johnny, a short order cook
- Setting: A one-room apartment in Manhattan

Premiere
- Date: June 2, 1987
- Place: Manhattan Theatre Club

Frankie and Johnny in the Clair de Lune is a two-character play by Terrence McNally that was first performed off-Broadway in 1987.

== Plot ==
The play opens in the dark with a couple making love in her one-room walk-up apartment in the west side of Manhattan. They are Johnny (originated by F. Murray Abraham), a short order cook, and Frankie (originated by Kathy Bates), a waitress. Johnny is certain he has found his soul mate in Frankie. She, on the other hand, is far more cautious and disinclined to jump to conclusions and at first has written off the encounter as a one night stand. As the night unfolds, they slowly reveal themselves to each other as they take tentative steps towards the possible start of a new relationship. Describing the scene from which the play gets its name, David Finkle wrote, "Johnny calls the radio station to request the most beautiful music ever written...Claude Debussy's 'Clair de lune'...floats onto the night air... Johnny, buoyant with love, beckons Frankie to join him at the window and to bask...in the clair de lune. It's a lovely moment..."

== Productions ==
=== Off-Broadway ===
The play opened Off-Broadway on June 2, 1987, at Stage II of the Manhattan Theatre Club, where it ran for two weeks. Directed by Paul Benedict, the original cast starred Kathy Bates and F. Murray Abraham. On October 14, 1987, it opened at Stage I for a six-week run. Kenneth Welsh played the part of Johnny in the Stage I production. On December 4, 1987, the play transferred to the Westside Theatre, and closed on March 12, 1989. Bruce Weitz and Carol Kane replaced Welsh and Bates later in the run. Kathy Bates won a 1988 Obie Award and was nominated for a 1987–1988 Drama Desk Award.

=== Broadway ===
The play opened on Broadway on July 26, 2002, in previews, officially on August 8, 2002, at the Belasco Theatre. Directed by Joe Mantello, the production starred Edie Falco and Stanley Tucci. The play closed on March 9, 2003 after 243 performances and 15 previews. Rosie Perez and Joe Pantoliano were replacements as of January 2003.

At the 57th Tony Awards, the play received nominations for Best Revival of a Play and for Best Leading Actor for Tucci.

A second Broadway revival opened on May 30, 2019, at the Broadhurst Theatre in a limited run. Audra McDonald and Michael Shannon starred in the production, which was directed by Arin Arbus. The play closed on July 28, 2019. At the 74th Tony Awards, it was nominated for Best Revival and for Best Leading Actress for McDonald.

== Adaptations ==
A 1991 film adaptation by McNally shortened the title to Frankie & Johnny. It starred Al Pacino and Michelle Pfeiffer. He made several changes from the play, adding new characters and locations.

Frankie and Johnny Are Married (2003) is a comedy film that refers to McNally's play. Written and directed by Michael Pressman, it explores the troubles a producer (which Pressman played as himself) has trying to mount a production of the Terrence McNally play.

== Awards and nominations ==
=== Original Off-Broadway production ===
Year	Award	Category	Nominee	Result
1988	Drama Desk Award	Outstanding Actress in a Play	Kathy Bates	Nominated

=== Original Broadway production ===
Year	Award	Category	Nominee	Result
2003	Tony Award	Best Actor in a Play	Stanley Tucci	Nominated

=== 2019 Broadway revival ===
Year	Award	Category	Nominee	Result
2020	Tony Awards	Best Revival of a Play		Nominated
2020	Tony Awards	Best Actress in a Play	Audra McDonald	Nominated
