= Tillamook Treasure =

The Tillamook Treasure
- Directed by: Jane Beaumont Hall
- Written by: Jane Beaumont Hall; Richard A. Doyon
- Produced by: Richard A. Doyon; Jane Beaumont Hall
- Starring: Suzanne Marie Doyon; Brian McNamara; Julia Campbell; Brian Thompson; Bradley Stryker; Janine Doyon; Mary Stein; Max Gail; Floyd Red Crow Westerman; Richard Doyon
- Release date: April 23, 2006 (Newport)
- Country: United States
- Language: English

Tillamook Treasure, also known as The Legend of Tillamook's Gold, is a 2006 American independent family film directed by Jane Beaumont Hall. It is set in the city of Manzanita, Oregon. Based on a Native American legend about a treasure buried on Neahkahnie Mountain by Spanish sailors in the 1590s, a 14-year-old girl discovers what is important in life.

== Production and distribution ==
Tillamook Treasure played the film festival circuit in 2006 and 2007, and was released theatrically in 2008 as The Legend of Tillamook's Gold. The film opened in one theater in Mesa, Arizona on March 28, 2008 as a theatrical test by Maitland Primrose Group, publishers of Moving Pictures magazine, in conjunction with film festival producers Kids First! The film premiered in Tillamook, Oregon in July 2007. The film was shot almost exclusively in Tillamook County.

== Plot ==
Sixteenth century Spanish sailors beach their launch on the Manzanita beach. They carry a treasure chest up Neahkahnie Mountain, leading a manacled African slave. The treasure is buried and the slave is killed and laid on top of the ground to "guard" the treasure and frighten away the local Indians.

Julie (Suzanne Marie Doyon), a lonely 14-year-old girl, and her family move from California to an Oregon seaside town as a last resort after her father loses his job. Her family has trouble adjusting to their new life and Julie is forgotten and ignored, as the family adjusts to living in uncle Jimmy's (Brian Thompson) seaside home.

Julie has a mystical encounter with a Roosevelt elk on the beach. The elk's fur has black hand prints on its neck. Its hooves uncover an old Spanish gold coin in the sand. The elk acts as Julie's guide and protector as she becomes drawn to the legend of Tillamook's gold.

She seeks the wisdom and guidance of her grandfather (Max Gail) and his good friend, Standing Elk (Floyd Red Crow Westerman). The men tell Julie the legend of the Spanish treasure and also of an elk, saved from drowning by the slave who, before his death, had grasped the exhausted animal as it swam near the Spanish launch. Julie is confused because 400 years later, she is convinced that "her elk" is the same elk. Julie's desire to solve the treasure mystery becomes a passion that leads to further mystery and self-discovery. When she experiences visions of Indians, she is frightened. When she tells Grandpa and Standing Elk, the elders realize that she is having a magical experience. Grandpa and Standing Elk suspect that Julie has been chosen to find the treasure and to release the spirit of the slave. They watch and guide her on her quest.

== Cast ==
- Julia Campbell as Kathryn Kimbell
- Janine Doyon as Susan Kimbell
- Richard A. Doyon as Clyde Savage
- Suzanne Marie Doyon as Julie Kimbell
- Max Gail as Grandpa Jack Kimbell
- Escher Holloway as Eddy
- Phillip Huber as Puppeteer
- Jan Michael Looking Wolf Reibach as Looking Wolf
- Brian McNamara as Robert Kimbell
- Zale Parry as Hardware Store Owner
- Mary Stein as Billie Stahl
- Bradley Stryker as Tom
- Brian Thompson as Jimmy Kimbell
- Floyd Red Crow Westerman as Standing Elk

== Awards ==
- 2006 Achievement Award for Best Family Feature, Newport Beach Film Festival
- 2006 Festival Prize for Best Family Film at the Toronto Fantasy Worldwide Film Festival
- 2007 Golden Reel Award for Best Children's Film at the Tiburon International Film Festival
- 2007 Best Indie Feature Age 5-12, Kids First! Film Festival
