= Two Idiots in Hollywood =

- VHS cover
- Directed by: Stephen Tobolowsky
- Written by: Stephen Tobolowsky
- Produced by: David Lancaster
- Starring: Jim McGrath; Jeff Doucette
- Cinematography: Robert Brinkmann
- Edited by: Andy Blumenthal
- Music by: Stephen Tobolowsky
- Production company: New World Pictures
- Release date: 1 October 1988
- Running time: 85 minutes
- Country: United States
- Language: English

Two Idiots in Hollywood is a 1988 comedy film written and directed by actor Stephen Tobolowsky, based on his stage play of the same name. It stars Jim McGrath and Jeff Doucette.

== Premise ==
Taylor and Murphy leave their small town existence in Ohio for the glamour of Hollywood. Taylor, completely without talent, becomes a successful television producer, while Murphy is tried for a murder he didn't commit.

== Principal cast ==
- Jim McGrath as Murphy Wegg
- Jeff Doucette as Taylor Dup
- Cheryl Anderson as Marianne Plambo
- Lisa Robins as NBA Casting Secretary
- Kurtwood Smith as Defense Attorney
- M. C. Gainey as Sgt. Albert

== Critical reception ==
The film was critically panned. From Chris Willman of The Los Angeles Times:

Possibly the worst film of this festival, or any festival of repute, ever. Director Stephen Tobolowsky and writer J. Barry Armstrong will no doubt take that passing hyperbole as a compliment, so heartily have they endeavored to make an awful camp classic, and how one wants to deny them even that satisfaction. Based on an equity-waiver revue, this foul-mouthed, free-wheeling, laughless comedy about two misogynist slobs trying to make it in show-biz is mostly for those who would like Sam Kinison if only he weren't such a heady guy.
