= Michael Pressman =

Film and television producer, director, and actor

- Born: 1950 (age 75–76); New York City, U.S.
- Education: Californian Institute of the Arts
- Alma mater: Carnegie-Mellon University
- Occupations: Director; producer; actor
- Years active: 1976–present
- Spouse: Maia Danziger
- Parent(s): David Pressman; Sasha Pressman

Michael Pressman (born 1950) is an American film and television producer, director, and actor

== Early life ==
Michael Pressman was born in Manhattan, United States, in 1950. His mother, Sasha, a modern dancer, was an original member of Martha Graham's first dance troupe. His father, David Pressman, was a theatrical and television director. His television career, which stalled in the early 1950s, was suddenly derailed when he was targeted by Senator Joseph McCarthy during his blacklisting of alleged communist sympathizers. He was unable to work in television for close to 15 years and became a teacher. He returned to television in the 1960s and directed soap operas. He directed the popular One Life to Live for almost 30 years, for which he was nominated for a Primetime Emmy and ten Daytime Emmys, winning three times.

== Career ==
Michael Pressman's interest in filmmaking was inspired by his father's career and persecution. He was a child actor in theater before becoming interested in directing and filmmaking when he was a teenager.

Pressman's first feature film was the crime comedy The Great Texas Dynamite Chase, in 1976 made in collaboration with producers and fellow film school students Sean Daniel and David Kirkpatrick.

Afterward, he directed films like The Bad News Bears in Breaking Training, the sequel to the original Walter Matthau film, the Dan Aykroyd comedy Doctor Detroit, and Teenage Mutant Ninja Turtles II: The Secret of the Ooze.

Pressman directed the 1979 film Boulevard Nights, a first Latino gang film that was selected for preservation by the Library of Congress in 2025. He followed that with Those Lips, Those Eyes, a love letter to the theater about the life of the actor in summer stock, starring Frank Langella.

With these successes behind him, Pressman chose to follow up not with another feature, which he had been offered, but with a 1985 short film entitled And The Children Shall Lead, which, for its time, was a racially progressive story starring Danny Glover, Beah Richards and LeVar Burton.

He was invited to direct Richard Pryor's post-Vietnam War drama, Some Kind of Hero, co-starring actress Margot Kidder. However, the studio disliked the dramatic tone envisioned by Pressman and the explicit love scene between the interracial leads, and recut the film without Pressman before release.

Afterward, Pressman began working in television films and series. His most successful television movie was To Heal a Nation, about the building of the Vietnam memorial starring Eric Roberts. He also directed the famed Anne Tyler novel Saint Maybe, starring a young Tom McCarthy, Blythe Danner and Mary-Louise Parker, for Hallmark Hall of Fame. His notoriety as a top director of dramatic content earned him an offer from David Kelley to co-executive produce and direct a much-anticipated new TV series called Picket Fences, which lasted four seasons and won him two Emmy Awards for Outstanding Drama Series. He next went on to launch Kelley's next show, Chicago Hope, which earned him another Emmy nomination for Outstanding Drama Series.

Since then, Pressman has produced and directed numerous network series, including multiple episodes of the Emmy Award-winning series Law & Order SVU, and two seasons of the then new series Blue Bloods. Pressman also directed the final two hours of the Emmy-nominated TV mini-series Law & Order True Crime: The Menendez Murders, starring Edie Falco and Heather Graham. Most recently, Pressman executive produced the fifth and sixth seasons of NBC's Chicago Med. He left the series after the first year of the pandemic.

Pressman's stage work includes directing the Los Angeles premiere of To Gillian on her 37th Birthday, which he then directed as a feature film starring Claire Danes, Michelle Pfeiffer, and Peter Gallagher, and a Los Angeles equity waiver production of Frankie and Johnny in the Claire De Lune, which he also later adapted into the independent film Frankie and Johnny are Married. He also directed the 2008 Broadway revival of Come Back, Little Sheba, for which he cast S. Epatha Merkerson in the role of the lead character Lola, which had previously been played only by white actresses, and depicted an interracial relationship on stage. Merkerson went on to be Tony nominated for her performance in this role, which the New York Times called, “a performance that stops the heart.” Pressman won Best Director that year at the NAACP Artist Awards.

In between series projects, Pressman also directed the play Finks in Los Angeles. It was a personal story for him, as it is about the blacklisting of comic actor Jack Gilford during the McCarthy witch-hunt. Joe Gilford, the author of the play, was a childhood friend, and they were able to share and embrace their pasts as children of the blacklist and how it affected both of their creative lives.

== Awards and nominations ==
Pressman won two Emmys for executive producing and showrunning the series Picket Fences. He earned an Emmy nomination and a DGA nomination for his work on the hospital drama Chicago Hope.

== Personal life ==
Pressman is married to actress Maia Danziger, who is also a creator of Relax and Write, a meditative writing program that she teaches around the world. They knew each other as children, having grown up in the same building on the upper west side of Manhattan.
