= George Tobolowsky =

American sculptor

George Tobolowsky is an American sculptor from Dallas, Texas. His works made from reclaimed materials have been featured in several solo and group exhibitions in museums, sculpture gardens, and galleries.

== Biography ==
Tobolowsky was born to a large Jewish family in Dallas, Texas. He is a descendant of Russian immigrants to the United States. Tobolowsky has two sisters; his brother Ira Tobolowsky was an attorney killed by a disgruntled client. Other members of the Tobolowsky family are also attorneys including Dallas District Court Judge Emily Tobolowsky. He attended Hillcrest High School and went on to study accounting and sculpture at Southern Methodist University. Tobolowsky studied sculpture with James Surls and Louise Nevelson. He later graduated with a Juris Doctor degree from SMU Law School in the early 1970s.

Tobolowsky began his career as an accountant at an accounting firm in Dallas before working at the legal and tax departments of the Zale Corporation. With partners, Tobolowsky owned franchise businesses including, at one time, up to 75 Blockbuster stores and several Dunkin' Donuts locations. In 1995, he built a sculpture studio in Mountain Springs but he did not begin making sculptures until 2004. Much like the sculptures he would later create, the studio was constructed with reclaimed materials.

As of 2012 Tobolowsky lived in Dallas with his wife Julie and four children.

== Sculpture ==
Since Tobolowsky began making sculptures in the mid-2000s, he has created more than 500 sculptures which have been exhibited in solo and group exhibitions. Tobolowsky makes sculpture from found objects. He obtains material for his sculptures from scrap yards and fabrication plants, bringing together the repurposed industrial waste into abstract compositions. Although Tobolowsky's works can sometimes weigh several tons, they have been described as "light and lyrical".

In 2006, Tobolowsky had his first solo exhibition at Gerald Peters Gallery in Dallas. His works have since also been exhibited at The Grace Museum, San Angelo Museum of Fine Arts, and Meadows Museum of Art. In October 2012, his 13-feet Ann-e Girl, a depiction a "tree of life" growing out of a metal brassiere was featured at the finish line of the Susan G. Komen Race for the Cure. The piece includes a 13-foot version of the garment with straps and a pair of cups fashioned from stainless steel tanks. Beginning in November 2012, the Museum of Biblical Art in Dallas also exhibited a sculpture by Tobolowsky, menorahs "made of polished steel found objects including drills and parts from airplanes and trucks".

In 2015, Tobolowsky was featured in Texas!, an exhibit of Texas-based artists at the National Academy of Art in New Delhi, India. At the 2017 Jerusalem Biennale, he was featured in the exhibition named Jewish Artists in America.

== Notable exhibitions ==
- 2010, Form & Substance: The Art of George Tobolowsky at The Grace Museum in Abilene, Texas
- 2010, Tyler Museum of Art in Tyler, Texas
- 2011, Ellen Noël Art Museum in Odessa, Texas
- 2012, Blue Star Contemporary Art Center in San Antonio, Texas
- 2015, Texas! at the National Academy of Art in New Delhi, India
- 2017, The Jerusalem Biennale for Contemporary Jewish Art, Jerusalem, Israel
- 2017, Meadows Museum of Art in Shreveport, Louisiana
- 2017, Lucile Halsell Conservatory at the Botanical Garden in San Antonio, Texas
- 2018, "A Long Road Back", University of Mississippi Museum, Oxford, Mississippi
