= Matt Roth (actor) =

American actor (born 1964)

- Born: Matthew P. Roth; September 15, 1964 (age 61)
- Occupation: Actor
- Years active: 1992–present
- Spouses: Laurie Metcalf (m. 2005; div. 2014) Stephanie Childers (m. 2015)
- Children: 3

Matthew P. Roth (born September 15, 1964) is an American actor. He had a recurring role on Roseanne as Jackie's abusive boyfriend, Fisher, from 1992 to 1993.

He joined the cast of Desperate Housewives in fall 2006 as new neighbor Art Shephard.

== Personal life ==
Roth began a relationship with his Roseanne co-star Laurie Metcalf. They have a son who was born in 1993 and a daughter who was born in 2005 via surrogate. They also adopted a son after fostering him at the age of six in 2006. They eventually married, and have also worked together on occasion, as in the 1994 feature film thriller Blink, the 1998 drama Chicago Cab, and Desperate Housewives. In September 2011, Roth filed for divorce citing irreconcilable differences. In May 2014, the divorce was finalized. Roth married Stephanie Childers in 2015.

== Filmography ==
Year	Title	Role	Notes
1990	Goodnight Sweet Wife: A Murder in Boston	Michael Stuart	Television film
1991	The Antagonists	Clark Munsinger	Main cast
1992	Melrose Place	Paul Brubecker	Episode: "Lonely Hearts"
1992–1993	Roseanne	Fisher	Recurring role, 6 episodes
1994	Blink	Officer Crowe	Feature film
1994	Blue Skies	Russell Evans	Main cast
1997	Crisis Center	Rick Buckley	Main cast
1997	'Til There Was You	Todd	Feature film
1997	Chicago Cab	Male Ad Exec	Feature film
1998	Where's Marlowe?	Client	Feature film
1998	Cupid	Dan Waters	Episode: "Heart of the Matter"
1999	Pups	Bank Worker #1	Feature film
1999	Frasier	Ted	Episode: "The Dog That Rocks the Cradle"
2003	View from the Top	Greg	Feature film
2003	According to Jim	Michael	Episode: "About a Girl"
2006	Grey's Anatomy	Michael Beglight	Episode: "What Have I Done to Deserve This?"
2006	Numb3rs	Mike Belweather	Episode: "Undercurrents"
2006	Desperate Housewives	Art Shepherd	Recurring role, 4 episodes
2007	Crossing Jordan	Dave Gilbert	Episode: "Shattered"
2007	CSI: Crime Scene Investigation	Sam Cooper	Episode: "Fallen Idols"
2007	Two and a Half Men	Greg	Episode: "Tucked, Taped and Gorgeous"
2007	Forever	Josh	Short film
2008	Ghost Whisperer	Derek Benjamin	Episode: "Slam"
2008	Big Shots	Ted	Episode: "Who's the Boss?"
2009	Chuck	Buy More Employee	Episode: "Chuck Versus the Predator"
2009	Without a Trace	Teddy Jones	Episode: "Devotion"
2009	Nip/Tuck	Frank	Episode: "Alexis Stone II"
2009	Three Rivers	Bill Dula	Episode: "A Roll of the Dice"
2011	Private Practice	Jack	Episode: "Two Steps Back"
2012, 2019	Modern Family	Skip Woosnum	Episodes: "Tableau Vivant" and "Commencement"
2013	Mom	Jerry	Episode: "Cotton Candy and Blended Fish"
2014	Longmire	Fred Tavish	Episode: "Reports of My Death"
2014	Perception	Brendan Voss	Episode: "Possession"
2014	Castle	Philip Dagmar	Episode: "Once Upon a Time in the West"
2014	Stalker	Roger Chase	Episode: "Tell All"
