= Crisis Center =

American drama television series

- Genre: Medical drama
- Created by: Thania St. John
- Starring: Kellie Martin; Matt Roth; Nia Peeples; Clifton Gonzalez-Gonzalez
- Composer: Danny Lux
- Country of origin: United States
- Original language: English
- No. of seasons: 1
- No. of episodes: 6

Production
- Executive producers: Joseph Stern; Thania St. John
- Running time: 60 minutes
- Production companies: Thania St. John Project; NBC Studios; Viacom Productions

Original release
- Network: NBC
- Release: February 28 – April 4, 1997

Crisis Center is an American medical drama television series that aired on NBC from February 28 until April 4, 1997.

== Premise ==
The series revolves around a crisis center in San Francisco where they deal with suicidal callers, hostage situations and mothers in labor.

== Cast ==
- Kellie Martin as Kathy Goodman
- Matt Roth as Dr. Rick Buckley
- Nia Peeples as Lily Gannon
- Tina Lifford as Tess Robinson
- Clifton Gonzalez-Gonzalez as Nando Taylor
- Dana Ashbrook as Gary McDermott

== Episodes ==
No.	Title	Directed by	Written by	Original release date
1	"The Center"	Richard Colla	Thania St. John	February 28, 1997
Kathy fails when trying to talk a caller out of killing himself, later driving the father of the deceased to desperate measures.
2	"It's a Family Affair"	Michael Lange	Story by : Thania St. John & Joshua Stern; Teleplay by : Thania St. John	March 7, 1997
Kathy is asked to help a girl with her alcoholic mother. Dr. Buckley tries to act as a mediator between a paroled drunk driver and a widower.
3	"He Said, She Said"	John Patterson	Emily Skopov	March 14, 1997
Kathy tries to help a victim of date-rape. Nando helps an addict who is about to get married.
4	"Someone to Watch Over Me"	Dan Lerner	Story by : Thania St. John & Joshua Stern; Teleplay by : Joshua Stern	March 21, 1997
Kathy's father tries to sell the family home. A patient of Lily falls in love with her. Dr. Buckley helps a boxer seeking political asylum.
5	"Where Truth Lies"	Jace Alexander	Story by : Thania St. John & Paul Brown; Teleplay by : Paul Brown	March 28, 1997
An arrogant doctor joins the staff at the crisis center. A patient of Dr. Buckley claims she witnessed a murder. Lily finds out the identity of her birth mother.
6	"Shots"	Michael Lange	Thania St. John	April 4, 1997
Gary is wounded and Kathy rushes to his side. Dr. Buckley has to choose between Lily and Stephanie.
