= List of film and television directors =

This is a list of notable directors in motion picture and television arts.

== A ==
- Dodo Abashidze
- George Abbott
- Norman Abbott
- Dan Abraham
- Phil Abraham
- Jim Abrahams
- Lenny Abrahamson
- Abiola Abrams
- J. J. Abrams
- Ivan Abramson
- Hany Abu-Assad
- Tengiz Abuladze
- Herbert Achternbusch
- Andy Ackerman
- Andrew Adamson
- Anita W. Addison
- Maren Ade
- Carine Adler
- Percy Adlon
- John G. Adolfi
- Franklin Adreon
- Ben Affleck
- Casey Affleck
- Neil Affleck
- Andrew Agnew
- Alejandro Agresti
- Scott Aharoni
- Joe Ahearne
- Caroline Aherne
- Abdel Rahim Ahmed
- Aqeel Ahmed
- Alexandre Aja
- Chantal Akerman
- Desiree Akhavan
- Fatih Akın
- Moustapha Akkad
- John Akomfrah
- R. Kan Albay
- Barbara Albert
- Félix Enríquez Alcalá
- Alan Alda
- Robert Aldrich
- Tomás Gutiérrez Alea
- Grigori Aleksandrov
- Victoria Aleksanyan
- Chris Alexander
- David Alexander
- Jason Alexander
- John Alexander
- Lexi Alexander
- Sherman Alexie
- Ozzie Alfonso
- Khalik Allah
- Marc Allégret
- Yves Allégret
- Elizabeth Allen
- Irwin Allen
- Lewis Allen
- Woody Allen
- Raine Allen-Miller
- Hassan Al-Imam
- Mairzee Almas
- Pedro Almodóvar
- Paul Almond
- Robert Altman
- Fede Álvarez
- Silvio Amadio
- Mathieu Amalric
- Rod Amateau
- Ned Ambler
- Gianni Amelio
- Alejandro Amenábar
- Jon Amiel
- Ana Lily Amirpour
- George Amponsah
- Dev Anand
- Sean Anders
- Thom Andersen
- Bob Anderson
- Brad Anderson
- Broncho Billy Anderson
- Deborah Anderson
- Gordon Anderson
- Justin Anderson
- Lindsay Anderson
- Michael Anderson
- Paul Thomas Anderson
- Paul W. S. Anderson
- Trevor Anderson
- Wes Anderson
- Roy Andersson
- Metodi Andonov
- Raoul André
- Bryan Andrews
- Kostas Andritsos
- Theo Angelopoulos
- Kenneth Anger
- Threes Anna
- Graham Annable
- Ken Annakin
- Jean-Jacques Annaud
- Hideaki Anno
- Arnold Antonin
- Michelangelo Antonioni
- Pan Anzi
- Judd Apatow
- Emmanuel Apea
- Apichatpong Weerasethakul
- Oscar Apfel
- Norman Apstein
- Michael Apted
- Gregg Araki
- Alfonso Aráu
- Roscoe Arbuckle
- Denys Arcand
- George Archainbaud
- Wes Archer
- Jane Arden
- Emile Ardolino
- Asia Argento
- Dario Argento
- Adam Arkin
- Allan Arkush
- Serena Armitage
- Dionciel Armstrong
- Gillian Armstrong
- Andrea Arnold
- Jack Arnold
- Darren Aronofsky
- Fernando Arrabal
- Miguel Arteta
- Larysa Artiugina
- Dorothy Arzner
- Dinara Asanova
- Hal Ashby
- John Mallory Asher
- Anthony Asquith
- Olivier Assayas
- Ari Aster
- Carlos Atanes
- Mark Atkinson
- Richard Attenborough
- Dan Attias
- David Attwood
- Jacques Audiard
- Jacqueline Audry
- John H. Auer
- Bille August
- Claude Autant-Lara
- Aram Avakian
- Roger Avary
- Pupi Avati
- Hy Averback
- Ilya Averbakh
- Julius Avery
- Tex Avery
- John G. Avildsen
- Jon Avnet
- David Ayer
- Dan Aykroyd
- Richard Ayoade
- Nabil Ayouch
- Mary Ayubi

Top of page

== B ==
=== Ba–Bh ===
- Jamie Babbit
- Héctor Babenco
- Lloyd Bacon
- Clarence G. Badger
- John Badham
- Bae Yong-Kyun
- Cindy Baer
- Prince Bagdasarian
- King Baggot
- Nadeem Baig
- Prano Bailey-Bond
- Jon S. Baird
- Stuart Baird
- Imruh Bakari
- Roy Ward Baker
- Sean Baker
- Mohammad Bakri
- Ralph Bakshi
- Bob Balaban
- Aleksei Balabanov
- Kailasam Balachander
- Jan Balej
- Peter Baldwin
- Wes Ball
- Carroll Ballard
- Anne Bancroft
- Albert Band
- Charles Band
- Biyi Bandele
- Elizabeth Banks
- Monty Banks
- Joseph Barbera
- Juan Antonio Bardem
- Richard L. Bare
- Francesco Barilli
- Sooraj R. Barjatya
- Clive Barker
- Reginald Barker
- Tom Barman
- Boris Barnet
- Matthew Barney
- Daniel Barnz
- Allen Baron
- David Barrett
- Chuck Barris
- Robert V. Barron
- Christopher Barry
- Morris Barry
- Drew Barrymore
- Lionel Barrymore
- Andrzej Bartkowiak
- Jules Bass
- M. J. Bassett
- Joy Batchelor
- Jason Bateman
- Otto Bathurst
- Paul Bartel
- Hall Bartlett
- Charles Barton
- Felix Basch
- Aclan Bates
- Matthew Bauer
- Jay Bauman
- Noah Baumbach
- Lamberto Bava
- Mario Bava
- Michael Bay
- Samuel Bayer
- Juan Antonio Bayona
- Edward Bazalgette
- Luigi Bazzoni
- Warren Beatty
- William Beaudine
- Harry Beaumont
- Harold Becker
- Jacques Becker
- Josh Becker
- Terry Becker
- Wolfgang Becker
- Guy Norman Bee
- Ford Beebe
- Greg Beeman
- Morgan Beggs
- Hans Behrendt
- Jean-Jacques Beineix
- Timur Bekmambetov
- Susan Belbin
- Monta Bell
- Earl Bellamy
- Troian Bellisario
- Marco Bellocchio
- Jerry Belson
- Maria Luisa Bemberg
- Steve Bendelack
- Jack Bender
- László Benedek
- Shyam Benegal
- Lubomír Beneš
- Roberto Benigni
- David Benioff
- Richard Benjamin
- Rodney Bennett
- Spencer Gordon Bennet
- Lizet Benrey
- Robert Benton
- Luca Bercovici
- Bruce Beresford
- Alec Berg
- Peter Berg
- Edward Berger
- Andrew Bergman
- Ingmar Bergman
- Busby Berkeley
- Luis Garcia Berlanga
- Greg Berlanti
- Abby Berlin
- Marc Berlin
- Robert Berlinger
- Andrea Berloff
- Paul Bern
- Ishmael Bernal
- Paul Bernard
- Curtis Bernhardt
- Adam Bernstein
- Claude Berri
- Halle Berry
- John Berry
- Arthur Berthelet
- André Berthomieu
- Bryan Bertino
- Bernardo Bertolucci
- Luc Besson
- Frank Beyer
- Bharathiraja

Top of page

=== Bi–Bz ===
- Ed Bianchi
- John Biddle
- Fabián Bielinsky
- Robert Bierman
- Kathryn Bigelow
- Tony Bill
- Anna Biller
- Peter Billingsley
- Bruce Bilson
- Brad Bird
- Bill Bixby
- Alice Guy-Blaché
- Herbert Blaché
- John Black
- Nicola Black
- Shane Black
- Farren Blackburn
- Gerald Blake
- George Blair
- Alessandro Blasetti
- William Peter Blatty
- Bertrand Blier
- Jeffrey Blitz
- Neill Blomkamp
- Matt Bloom
- Don Bluth
- John G. Blystone
- Keith Boak
- James Bobin
- Anna Boden and Ryan Fleck
- Richard Boden
- Eugeniusz Bodo
- Carl Boese
- Budd Boetticher
- Paul Bogart
- Peter Bogdanovich
- José Bohr
- Michel Boisrond
- Patrick Bokanowski
- Richard Boleslawski
- Uwe Boll
- Mauro Bolognini
- Fyodor Bondarchuk
- Sergei Bondarchuk
- Bong Joon-ho
- Linwood Boomer
- John Boorman
- Gavin Michael Booth
- Kristoffer Borgli
- Walerian Borowczyk
- Frank Borzage
- John and Roy Boulting
- Martin Bourboulon
- Lucien Bourjeily
- David Bowers
- Kansas Bowling
- Pearl Bowser
- Muriel Box
- David Boyd
- Dermot Boyd
- Danny Boyle
- Charles Brabin
- Richard Bracewell
- Harry Bradbeer
- Robert N. Bradbury
- John Brahm
- Stan Brakhage
- Matt Braly
- A.V. Bramble
- Kenneth Branagh
- Spike Brandt
- Fred C. Brannon
- Tinto Brass
- Charles Braverman
- Frank Braxton
- Kevin Bray
- Neil Breen
- Catherine Breillat
- Herbert Brenon
- Will Brenton
- Vinko Brešan
- Robert Bresson
- Martin Brest
- Howard Bretherton
- Eric Brevig
- Craig Brewer
- Michael E. Briant
- Monte Brice
- Patrick Brice
- Sean Bridgers
- James Bridges
- Nicholas Briggs
- Guido Brignone
- Steven Brill
- Philippe de Broca
- Tricia Brock
- Lino Brocka
- Rex Bromfield
- Henry Bronchtein
- Ronald Bronstein
- Peter Brook
- Albert Brooks
- James L. Brooks
- Mel Brooks
- Richard Brooks
- Nick Broomfield
- Simon Bross
- James Broughton
- Otto Brower
- Clarence Brown
- Harry Joe Brown
- Rowland Brown
- William H. Brown Jr.
- Tod Browning
- Martin Bruestle
- Adrian Brunel
- Nick Bruno
- Neville Buchanan
- Chris Buck
- Detlev Buck
- Tom Buckingham
- Marc Buckland
- Norman Buckley
- Colin Bucksey
- Harold S. Bucquet
- Jan Bucquoy
- Danny Buday
- John Carl Buechler
- Bradley Buecker
- Luis Buñuel
- Janice Burgess
- Pete Burness
- Charles Burnett
- Bo Burnham
- Edward Burns
- Justin Burquist
- James Burrows
- Tim Burstall
- Tim Burton
- Steve Buscemi
- Alexander Butler
- Brian Patrick Butler
- Chris Butler
- David Butler
- John Butler
- Robert Butler
- Ray Butt
- Jörg Buttgereit
- Zane Buzby
- Edward Buzzell
- Ed Bye
- James Ward Byrkit

Top of page

== C ==
- Christy Cabanne
- Michael Cacoyannis
- Margarita Cadenas
- Israel Adrián Caetano
- David Caffrey
- Nicolas Cage
- James Cagney
- Mike Cahill
- Edward L. Cahn
- James Cameron
- Douglas Camfield
- Augusto Caminito
- Donald Cammell
- Joe Camp
- Juan José Campanella
- Colin Campbell
- Jonny Campbell
- Martin Campbell
- Mont Campbell
- Norman Campbell
- Jane Campion
- Antonio Campos
- Danny Cannon
- Dyan Cannon
- Kay Cannon
- Colin Cant
- Graham Cantwell
- Peter Capaldi
- Albert Capellani
- Frank Capra
- Luigi Capuano
- Leos Carax
- Jack Cardiff
- Christian Carion
- Joe Carnahan
- Marcel Carné
- John Carney
- Giuliano Carnimeo
- Marc Caro
- Niki Caro
- Benjamin Caron
- John Carpenter
- Thomas Carr
- Enrique Carreras
- John Paddy Carstairs
- Chris Carter
- D. J. Caruso
- Enrico Casarosa
- Chris Cashman
- John Cassavetes
- Nick Cassavetes
- P. J. Castellaneta
- William Castle
- Joe Castro
- Torre Catalano
- Michael Caton-Jones
- Peter Cattaneo
- Alberto Cavalcanti
- Liliana Cavani
- Paolo Cavara
- André Cayatte
- Ralph Ceder
- Christiane Cegavske
- Jeff Celentano
- Simon Cellan Jones
- Mark Cendrowski
- Tony Cervone
- Pablo César
- Nuri Bilge Ceylan
- Claude Chabrol
- Gurinder Chadha
- Justin Chadwick
- Don Chaffey
- Aneesh Chaganty
- Youssef Chahine
- Fruit Chan
- Jackie Chan
- Peter Chan
- Charlie Chaplin
- Larry Charles
- Charley Chase
- David Chase
- Émile Chautard
- Michael Chaves
- Damien Chazelle
- Stephen Chbosky
- Jeremiah S. Chechik
- Kate Cheeseman
- Peter Chelsom
- Kaige Chen
- Pierre Chenal
- Yarrow Cheney
- David Cherkassky
- Tom Cherones
- Marc Cherry
- Pierre Chevalier
- Milan Cheylov
- Abigail Child
- Ching Siu-Tung
- Stephen Chiodo
- Samson Chiu
- Tadeusz Chmielewski
- Lisa Cholodenko
- Joyce Chopra
- Yash Chopra
- Chor Yuen
- Deborah Chow
- Stephen Chow
- Benjamin Christensen
- Shawn Christensen
- Christian-Jaque
- Roger Christian
- Rich Christiano
- Roger Christiansen
- Jon M. Chu
- Grigori Chukhrai
- Lee Isaac Chung
- Peter Chung
- Věra Chytilová
- Derek Cianfrance
- Michael Cimino
- Claudio Cipelletti
- Souleymane Cissé
- Louis C.K.
- René Clair
- Bob Clampett
- Bob Clark
- Larry Clark
- Richard Clark
- Alan Clarke
- Shirley Clarke
- S. J. Clarkson
- William F. Claxton
- Barnaby Clay
- Jack Clayton
- Tom Clegg
- William Clemens
- Jemaine Clement
- René Clément
- Ron Clements
- Elmer Clifton
- Edward F. Cline
- George Clooney
- Chris Clough
- Robert Clouse
- Henri-Georges Clouzot
- Enrico Cocozza
- Jean Cocteau
- Coen Brothers
- Clément Cogitore
- Romain Cogitore
- Larry Cohen
- Rob Cohen
- Sidney Cole
- John David Coles
- Jaume Collet-Serra
- Keri Collins
- Lewis D. Collins
- Chris Columbus
- Timothy Combe
- Luigi Comencini
- Bill Condon
- Bruce Conner
- Jack Conway
- Ryan Coogler
- Barry Cook
- Fielder Cook
- Victor Cook
- Josh Cooley
- Hal Cooper
- Merian C. Cooper
- Francis Ford Coppola
- Roman Coppola
- Sofia Coppola
- Frank Coraci
- Brady Corbet
- Sergio Corbucci
- Roger Corman
- Alain Corneau
- Joe Cornish
- Orlando Corradi
- Rich Correll
- Trent Correy
- Lloyd Corrigan
- Helena Cortesina
- Don Coscarelli
- Brian Cosgrove
- George Pan Cosmatos
- Pedro Costa
- Costa-Gavras
- Kevin Costner
- Manny Coto
- T. Arthur Cottam
- Alex Cox
- Frank Cox
- Paul Cox
- William James Craft
- Kelly Fremon Craig
- William Crain
- Bryan Cranston
- Wes Craven
- Joel Crawford
- Peter Cregeen
- Destin Daniel Cretton
- Charles Crichton
- Michael Crichton
- Jon Cring
- Donald Crisp
- Armando Crispino
- John Crockett
- David Croft
- Donald Crombie
- John Cromwell
- Brandon Cronenberg
- David Cronenberg
- Mackenzie Crook
- Alan Crosland
- Matthew Crouch
- Cameron Crowe
- John Crowley
- James Cruze
- Billy Crystal
- Arzén von Cserépy
- Alfonso Cuarón
- Chris Cuddington
- Michael Cudlitz
- George Cukor
- Jeremy Culver
- Fiona Cumming
- Jim Cummings
- Irving Cummings
- Michael Cumming
- James Cunningham
- Sean S. Cunningham
- Marshall Curry
- Adam Curtis
- Dan Curtis
- Jamie Lee Curtis
- Richard Curtis
- Michael Curtiz
- Michael Cusack
- Paul Czinner

Top of page

== D ==
- Nia DaCosta
- Diminas Dagogo
- John Dahl
- Alan Dale
- John Francis Daley
- Stephen Daldry
- Massimo Dallamano
- Rebecca Daly
- Joe D'Amato
- Georgi Daneliya
- Rod Daniel
- Frank Daniel
- Greg Daniels
- Lee Daniels
- Stan Daniels
- Vladimir Danilevich
- Joe Dante
- Frank Darabont
- Joan Darling
- Eric Darnell
- Harry d'Abbadie d'Arrast
- Jules Dassin
- Hayato Date
- Gary Dauberman
- Herschel Daugherty
- Byambasuren Davaa
- Delmer Daves
- Alki David
- Hugh David
- John Howard Davies
- John Rhys-Davies
- Terence Davies
- Andrew Davis
- Garth Davis
- Ossie Davis
- Tamra Davis
- J. Searle Dawley
- Roxann Dawson
- Shane Dawson
- Robert Day (director)
- Jonathan Dayton
- Drew Daywalt
- Basil Dean
- Basil Dearden
- Tiffanie DeBartolo
- Jan de Bont
- Philippe de Broca
- Fred de Cordova
- Allen Coulter
- Albert de Courville
- Russell DeGrazier
- Rolf de Heer
- Steve De Jarnatt
- Fred Dekker
- Alex de la Iglesia
- Jean Delannoy
- Bruce Dellis
- Greg DeLiso
- Hampton Del Ruth
- Roy Del Ruth
- Guillermo del Toro
- Alberto De Martino
- Kirk DeMicco
- Cecil B. DeMille
- William C. deMille
- Jonathan Demme
- Ted Demme
- James DeMonaco
- Jacques Demy
- Reginald Denham
- Robert De Niro
- Claire Denis
- Martin Dennis
- Pen Densham
- Ruggero Deodato
- Jeff Deverett
- Manoel de Oliveira
- Brian De Palma
- Serge de Poligny
- Johnny Depp
- John Derek
- Maya Deren
- Scott Derrickson
- Bernard Derriman
- Giuseppe de Santis
- Vittorio De Sica
- Tom DeSimone
- Howard Deutch
- Michel Deville
- Danny DeVito
- Dean Devlin
- Maury Dexter
- David Dhavan
- Matthew Diamond
- Emma-Rosa Dias
- Tom DiCillo
- Nigel Dick
- Vivienne Dick
- Ernest Dickerson
- Thorold Dickinson
- William Kennedy Dickson
- Carlos Diegues
- Vin Diesel
- William Dieterle
- Helmut Dietl
- J. D. Dillard
- John Francis Dillon
- Michael Dante DiMartino
- Mark Dindal
- Mark A.Z. Dippé
- Mike Disa
- Lino DiSalvo
- Walt Disney
- Adriaan Ditvoorst
- Ivan Dixon
- Edward Dmytryk
- Darren Doane
- David Dobkin
- Lawrence Dobkin
- Pete Docter
- Jacques Doillon
- Michael Dolan
- Xavier Dolan
- Miles Doleac
- Andrew Dominik
- Roger Donaldson
- Stanley Donen
- Ciaran Donnelly
- Clive Donner
- Richard Donner
- Mark Donskoi
- Robert Dornhelm
- Doris Dörrie
- Nelson Pereira dos Santos
- Maïmouna Doucouré
- Michael Dougherty
- Gordon Douglas
- Robert Douglas
- Aleksandr Dovzhenko
- Tony Dow
- John Erick Dowdle
- Kevin Dowling
- B. E. Doxat-Pratt
- Jim Drake
- Oliver Drake
- Polly Draper
- Jean Dréville
- Ben Drew
- Carl Theodor Dreyer
- Marcel Duchamp
- Frederik Du Chau
- Terence Dudley
- Peter Duffell
- Duffer brothers
- Troy Duffy
- Dennis Dugan
- Joshua Dugdale
- Bill Duke
- Bruno Dumont
- Duwayne Dunham
- George Dunning
- Cheryl Dunye
- Quentin Dupieux
- Jay Duplass
- Mark Duplass
- Ewald André Dupont
- Momina Duraid
- Marguerite Duras
- Fred Durst
- Richard Dutcher
- Guru Dutt
- Robert Duvall
- Ava DuVernay
- Julien Duvivier
- Allan Dwan

Top of page

== E ==
- B. Reeves Eason
- Clint Eastwood
- Uli Edel
- Blake Edwards
- Gareth Edwards
- Harry Edwards
- Shawn Efran
- Robert Eggers
- Eagle Egilsson
- Atom Egoyan
- Mohammed Ehteshamuddin
- Lena Einhorn
- Sergei Eisenstein
- Gösta Ekman
- Richard Elfman
- Stephan Elliott
- David R. Ellis
- Robert Ellis
- Scott Ellis
- Maurice Elvey
- Obi Emelonye
- John Emerson
- Roland Emmerich
- Andy De Emmony
- Cy Endfield
- John English
- Robert Englund
- Robert Enrico
- Ray Enright
- Jason Ensler
- Ildikó Enyedi
- Nora Ephron
- Sheldon Epps
- Jean Epstein
- Luciano Ercoli
- Víctor Erice
- Chester Erskine
- Juan Escobedo
- Giancarlo Esposito
- Danishka Esterhazy
- Lukas Ettlin
- Jean Eustache
- David M. Evans
- Gareth Evans
- Marc Evans
- Valie Export
- Chris Eyre
- Richard Eyre

Top of page

== F ==
- Peter Faiman
- Ben Falcone
- Rick Famuyiwa
- James Fargo
- Asghar Farhadi
- Julian Farino
- Valerie Faris
- Harun Farocki
- Bobby Farrelly
- Peter Farrelly
- John Farrow
- Rainer Werner Fassbinder
- Mona Fastvold
- Leonardo Favio
- Jon Favreau
- Sam Feder
- Fei Mu
- Paul Feig
- Paul Fejos
- Sam Fell
- Andrea Fellers
- Federico Fellini
- Emerald Fennell
- Michael Ferguson
- Guy Ferland
- Emilio Fernández
- Abel Ferrara
- Marco Ferreri
- Giorgio Ferroni
- Chris Fesko
- Louis Feuillade
- Jacques Feyder
- Severin Fiala
- Sally Field
- Todd Field
- Chip Fields
- Ralph Fiennes
- Mike Figgis
- Dave Filoni
- David Fincher
- Will Finn
- Elvira Fischer
- Terence Fisher
- Dallas M. Fitzgerald
- George Fitzmaurice
- Robert J. Flaherty
- Mike Flanagan
- Gary Fleder
- Dave Fleischer
- Max Fleischer
- Richard Fleischer
- Ruben Fleischer
- Andrew Fleming
- Victor Fleming
- Anne Fletcher
- Dexter Fletcher
- Mandie Fletcher
- Benedek Fliegauf
- James Flood
- Robert Florey
- Emmett J. Flynn
- Shannon Flynn
- James Foley
- Sheree Folkson
- Jorge Fons
- Bryan Forbes
- Aleksander Ford
- Francis Ford
- Jeremy J. Ford
- John Ford
- Philip Ford
- Tom Ford
- Eugene Forde
- Miloš Forman
- Tom Forman
- Willi Forst
- Marc Forster
- Bill Forsyth
- John Fortenberry
- Amparo Fortuny
- Bob Fosse
- Jodie Foster
- Lilibet Foster
- Lewis R. Foster
- Michael Lewis Foster
- Norman Foster
- Jeff Fowler
- Wallace Fox
- Bryan Foy
- Jonathan Frakes
- Rhys Frake-Waterfield
- Coleman Francis
- James Franco
- Jesús Franco
- Georges Franju
- Melvin Frank
- Scott Frank
- David Frankel
- John Frankenheimer
- Carl Franklin
- Howard Franklin
- Sidney Franklin
- Veronika Franz
- Harry L. Fraser
- Toa Fraser
- James Frawley
- David Frazee
- Stephen Frears
- Riccardo Freda
- Sydney Freeland
- Thornton Freeland
- Morgan Freeman
- Morgan J. Freeman
- Mark Freiburger
- Lloyd French
- Victor French
- Juan Carlos Fresnadillo
- Karl Freund
- Ron Fricke
- Fridrik Thor Fridriksson
- Jason Friedberg
- Lionel Friedberg
- David Friedkin
- William Friedkin
- Seymour Friedman
- Su Friedrich
- Gunther von Fritsch
- Carl Froelich
- Sarah Frost
- Soleil Moon Frye
- Zetna Fuentes
- Kinji Fukasaku
- Shozin Fukui
- Lucio Fulci
- Sam Fuller
- Antoine Fuqua
- Sidney J. Furie
- Tim Fywell

Top of page

== G ==
- Béla Gaál
- Leonid Gaidai
- Ray Gallardo
- Florian Gallenberger
- Francis Galluppi
- Alex Galvin
- Harry Gamboa Jr.
- Abel Gance
- Christophe Gans
- Dennis Gansel
- Arline Gant
- Robert Ben Garant
- Carla Garapedian
- Ana García Blaya
- Rodrigo García
- Jeremy Garelick
- Jeff Garlin
- Tay Garnett
- Philippe Garrel
- Mick Garris
- Matteo Garrone
- Harry Garson
- William Garwood
- Louis J. Gasnier
- Tucker Gates
- Mark Gatiss
- Tony Gatlif
- Nils Gaup
- Roberto Gavaldón
- Barrie Gavin
- Galder Gaztelu-Urrutia
- Paul Geday
- Jean Genet
- Xavier Gens
- Giacomo Gentilomo
- Fred Gerber
- Aleksei Alekseivich German
- Aleksei Yuryevich German
- Pietro Germi
- Clyde Geronimi
- Kurt Gerron
- Douchan Gersi
- Viktor Gertler
- Ricky Gervais
- Greta Gerwig
- Jennifer Getzinger
- Subhash Ghai
- Ritwik Ghatak
- Bahman Ghobadi
- Charles Giblyn
- Angela Gibson
- Mel Gibson
- Billy Gierhart
- Joaquin "Kino" Gil
- John Gilbert
- Lewis Gilbert
- David Giler
- Dan Gilroy
- Tony Gilroy
- Stuart Gillard
- Craig Gillespie
- Tyler Gillett
- Terry Gilliam
- Vince Gilligan
- John Gilling
- Arvid E. Gillstrom
- Bernard Girard
- Marino Girolami
- Ken Girotti
- Pavel Giroud
- Amos Gitai
- Ellen Gittelsohn
- Stanka Gjurić
- Rose Glass
- Lesli Linka Glatter
- Jonathan Glazer
- John Glen
- Peter Glenville
- James Glickenhaus
- Will Gluck
- Jean-Luc Godard
- Andy Goddard
- Drew Goddard
- Theo van Gogh
- Michael Goi
- Menahem Golan
- Evan Goldberg
- Jonathan Goldstein
- Bobcat Goldthwait
- Nick Gomez
- Alfonso Gomez-Rejon
- Michel Gondry
- Alejandro González Iñárritu
- Martin Gooch
- Derrick Goodwin
- Leslie Goodwins
- Rupert Goold
- Adoor Gopalakrishnan
- Bryan Gordon
- George Gordon
- Michael Gordon
- Seth Gordon
- Stuart Gordon
- John Gorrie
- Yana Gorskaya
- Hideo Gosha
- Ryan Gosling
- Raja Gosnell
- Lisa Gottlieb
- Peter Gould
- Alfred Goulding
- Edmund Goulding
- Ashutosh Gowariker
- Jake Graf
- Todd Graff
- William A. Graham
- Michael Grandage
- Brian Grant
- Lee Grant
- Alex Graves
- F. Gary Gray
- Adam Green
- Alfred E. Green
- Dave Green
- David Green
- David Gordon Green
- Guy Green
- Hilton A. Green
- Norm Green
- Pamela Green
- Steph Green
- Tom Green
- Peter Greenaway
- Josh Greenbaum
- C. H. Greenblatt
- Paul Greengrass
- Jeff Greenstein
- Robert Greenwald
- Edwin Greenwood
- Robert Gregson
- Jean Grémillon
- Johannes Grenzfurthner
- John Greyson
- John Grierson
- Ken Grieve
- D. W. Griffith
- Edward H. Griffith
- Murray Grigor
- Peter Grimwade
- Nick Grinde
- David Grossman (director)
- Luca Guadagnino
- Matthew Gray Gubler
- Romolo Guerrieri
- Christopher Guest
- Val Guest
- John Guillermin
- Fred Guiol
- Sacha Guitry
- Yilmaz Güney
- Andrew Gunn
- James Gunn
- Hrafn Gunnlaugsson
- Manish Gupta
- Stephen Gurewitz
- Jorge Gutierrez
- Sebastian Gutierrez
- Alice Guy-Blaché
- Patricio Guzmán

Top of page

== H ==
- Charles F. Haas
- Kamal Haasan
- Taylor Hackford
- Zach Hadel
- Tala Hadid
- Lucile Hadžihalilović
- Piers Haggard
- Paul Haggis
- Larry Hagman
- Don Hahn
- Jody Margolin Hahn
- Charles Haid
- Andrew Haigh
- John Halas
- Alexander Hall
- Don Hall
- Lasse Hallström
- Victor Hugo Halperin
- Gary Halvorson
- Ryusuke Hamaguchi
- Craig Hamann
- John Hamburg
- Bent Hamer
- Robert Hamer
- Guy Hamilton
- Hamish Hamilton
- Jonathan Hammond
- Sanaa Hamri
- Victor Hanbury
- John D. Hancock
- Michael Haneke
- Tom Hanks
- William Hanna
- Ken Hannam
- Curtis Hanson
- Geir Hansteen Jörgensen
- Alex Hardcastle
- Neasa Hardiman
- Catherine Hardwicke
- Sam Hargrave
- Graeme Harper
- Tom Harper
- Veit Harlan
- Renny Harlin
- Harry Harris
- Kenna Harris
- Owen Harris
- Peter Harris
- Mary Harron
- Harvey Hart
- William S. Hart
- Hal Hartley
- Anthony Harvey
- Herk Harvey
- Jack Harvey
- Wojciech Has
- Henry Hathaway
- James Hawes
- Phil Hawkins
- Howard Hawks
- Will Hay
- Salma Hayek
- Michael Hayes
- David Hayman
- James Hayman
- Toby Haynes
- Todd Haynes
- Jimmy Hayward
- Michel Hazanavicius
- He Ping
- Amy Heckerling
- Siân Heder
- Victor Heerman
- Ralph Hemecker
- Anthony Hemingway
- Zachary Heinzerling
- Stuart Heisler
- Jalmari Helander
- Brian Helgeland
- Marielle Heller
- Monte Hellman
- Michael "Ffish" Hemschoot
- Joseph Henabery
- Chris Henchy
- Florian Henckel von Donnersmarck
- Dell Henderson
- John Henderson
- Frank Henenlotter
- Hobart Henley
- Paul Henreid
- Julian Henriques
- Buck Henry
- Brian Henson
- Jim Henson
- Perry Henzell
- Paula Heredia
- Stephen Herek
- Albert Herman
- Oliver Hermanus
- Kate Herron
- William Blake Herron
- Michael Herz
- John Herzfeld
- Werner Herzog
- Zako Heskiya
- Jared Hess
- Jerusha Hess
- Gordon Hessler
- Charlton Heston
- Fraser Heston
- Marianne Hettinger
- Jennifer Love Hewitt
- David Hewlett
- John Heys
- Douglas Hickox
- Scott Hicks
- Howard Higgin
- George Roy Hill
- George Hill
- Jack Hill
- Jody Hill
- Robert F. Hill
- Sinclair Hill
- Walter Hill
- Stephen Hillenburg
- Arthur Hiller
- William Byron Hillman
- Lambert Hillyer
- Anthony Himbs
- Art Hindle
- Cheryl Hines
- Ryūichi Hiroki
- Oliver Hirschbiegel
- Leon Hirszman
- Leslie S. Hiscott
- Alfred Hitchcock
- Godfrey Ho
- Ho Ping
- Peter Hoar
- Jessica Hobbs
- Gregory Hoblit
- Brent Hodge
- Mike Hodges
- Jack Hofsiss
- James P. Hogan
- P. J. Hogan
- Clive Holden
- Agnieszka Holland
- Todd Holland
- Tom Holland
- Savage Steve Holland
- Tonya Holly
- Ben Holmes
- John Holmquist
- Seth Holt
- Ishirō Honda
- Mitsuru Hongo
- Tobe Hooper
- Tom Hooper
- Stephen Hopkins
- Dennis Hopper
- Jerry Hopper
- Gwyneth Horder-Payton
- Leonard Horn
- James W. Horne
- Oliver Horsbrugh
- Hou Hsiao-hsien
- Harrison Houde
- John Hough
- Benjamin Howard
- Bryce Dallas Howard
- Byron Howard
- David Howard
- Michael Howard
- Ron Howard
- William Howard
- Peter Howitt
- King Hu
- L. Ron Hubbard
- Reginald Hudlin
- Hugh Hudson
- Bronwen Hughes
- Howard Hughes
- John Hughes
- Ken Hughes
- Robert F. Hughes
- Terry Hughes
- Ann Hui
- Danièle Huillet
- Arthur Humberstone
- H. Bruce Humberstone
- André Hunebelle
- Helen Hunt
- Tim Hunter
- Lawrence Huntington
- Nick Hurran
- Michael Hurst
- Metin Hüseyin
- Waris Hussein
- John Huston
- Charles Hutchison
- Brian G. Hutton
- Willard Huyck
- Hwang Dong-hyuk
- Peter Hyams

Top of page

== I ==
- Armando Iannucci
- Juan Ibáñez
- Kon Ichikawa
- Steve Ihnat
- Brian Iles
- Im Kwon-Taek
- Shōhei Imamura
- Michael Imison
- Hiroshi Inagaki
- John Ince
- Ralph Ince
- Thomas H. Ince
- Rex Ingram
- Ciro Ippolito
- Dickson Iroegbu
- John Irvin
- George Irving
- Kyōhei Ishiguro
- Debbie Isitt
- Marc Israel
- Jūzō Itami
- Aleksandr Ivanovsky
- Ivan Ivanov-Vano
- Joris Ivens
- James Ivory

Top of page

== J ==
- Jacques Jaccard
- David Jackson
- Dianne Jackson
- Michael Jackson
- Mick Jackson
- Paul Jackson
- Peter Jackson
- Wilfred Jackson
- Jordan Jacobo
- Gregory Jacobs
- Rick Jacobson
- Sarah Jacobson
- Henry Jaglom
- Wanda Jakubowska
- Alan James
- Steve James
- Brian Jamieson
- Miklós Jancsó
- Jang Joon-hwan
- Leigh Janiak
- Bob Jaques
- Derek Jarman
- Jim Jarmusch
- Julian Jarrold
- Charles Jarrott
- Risto Jarva
- Leigh Jason
- Cord Jefferson
- Barry Jenkins
- Dallas Jenkins
- Patty Jenkins
- Garth Jennings
- Humphrey Jennings
- Shelley Jensen
- Jean-Pierre Jeunet
- Norman Jewison
- Jia Zhangke
- Jiang Wen
- Jaromil Jireš
- Suresh Joachim
- Phil Joanou
- Alejandro Jodorowsky
- Mark Joffe
- Roland Joffé
- Clark Johnson
- Craig Johnson
- Duke Johnson
- Lamont Johnson
- Liza Johnson
- Mark Steven Johnson
- Nunnally Johnson
- Rian Johnson
- Tim Johnson
- Joe Johnston
- Gerard Johnstone
- Angelina Jolie
- Chuck Jones
- Duncan Jones
- F. Richard Jones
- Grover Jones
- Michael Jones
- Ron Jones
- Terry Jones
- Tommy Lee Jones
- Spike Jonze
- Neil Jordan
- Michael B. Jordan
- Edward José
- Max Joseph
- Jon Jost
- Louis Jouvet
- Paul Joyce
- Jonathan Judge
- Mike Judge
- Rupert Julian
- Isaac Julien
- Miranda July
- Nathan Juran

Top of page

== K ==
- Karel Kachyňa
- George Kaczender
- Jeremy Kagan
- Mauricio Kagel
- Dustin Kahia
- Joseph Kahn
- Alex Kahuam
- Sathish Kalathil
- Mikhail Kalatozov
- Alex Kalymnios
- Kamal
- Arunraja Kamaraj
- Sekhar Kammula
- Deborah Kampmeier
- Puttanna Kanagal
- Adam Kane
- Joseph Kane
- Shusuke Kaneko
- Jeff Kanew
- Kang Je-gyu
- Garson Kanin
- Jonathan Kaplan
- Raj Kapoor
- Shekhar Kapur
- Pekka Karjalainen
- Phil Karlson
- Roman Karmen
- Jason Kartalian
- Jake Kasdan
- Lawrence Kasdan
- Mathieu Kassovitz
- Aaron Katz
- Lloyd Kaufman
- Philip Kaufman
- Aki Kaurismäki
- Mika Kaurismäki
- Helmut Käutner
- Jerzy Kawalerowicz
- Minoru Kawasaki
- Tony Kaye
- Elia Kazan
- Buster Keaton
- Abdellatif Kechiche
- William Keighley
- Asaad Kelada
- Frederick King Keller
- Harry Keller
- Michael Keller
- Barnet Kellman
- Brian Kelly
- Gene Kelly
- Richard Kelly
- Gil Kenan
- David Kendall
- Alex Kendrick
- Anna Kendrick
- Erle Kenton
- James V. Kern
- David Kerr
- Robert Kerr
- Michael Kerrigan
- Irvin Kershner
- James Kerwin
- Abbas Kiarostami
- James Kicklighter
- Krzysztof Kieślowski
- Maggie Kiley
- Edward Killy
- Kim Jee-woon
- Kim Ki-duk
- Max Kimmich
- Anthony Kimmins
- Simon Kinberg
- Burton King
- Gary King
- George King
- Henry King
- Louis King
- Paul King
- Shaka King
- Stephen King
- Keisuke Kinoshita
- Klaus Kinski
- Teinosuke Kinugasa
- Brian Kirk
- Randal Kirk
- Mark Kirkland
- Lyudmil Kirkov
- Karey Kirkpatrick
- Alan Kirschenbaum
- Ryuhei Kitamura
- Takeshi Kitano
- Alf Kjellin
- William Klein
- Randal Kleiser
- Elem Klimov
- León Klimovsky
- Alexander Kluge
- Jennifer Kluska
- Harley Knoles
- Masaki Kobayashi
- Chris Koch
- Kogonada
- Bob Koherr
- Vincent Kok
- Henry Kolker
- Alexander Kolowrat
- Satoshi Kon
- Andrei Konchalovsky
- Larysa Kondracki
- Tadeusz Konwicki
- Alexander Korda
- Zoltan Korda
- Hirokazu Koreeda
- Harmony Korine
- Caryl Korma
- Baltasar Kormákur
- Brigitte Kornetzky
- John Korty
- Joseph Kosinski
- Henry Koster
- Ted Kotcheff
- Mariusz Kotowski
- Serguei Kouchnerov
- Nikos Koundouros
- Jan Kounen
- Josh Koury
- Paul Kowalski
- Aaron Kozak
- Ivan Kraljevic
- Stanley Kramer
- Alexis Krasilovsky
- John Krasinski
- Kurt Kren
- Mitchell Kriegman
- Krishnan–Panju
- William Kronick
- Stanley Kubrick
- George Kuchar
- Cy Kuckenbaker
- Lev Kuleshov
- Roger Kumble
- Zacharias Kunuk
- Akira Kurosawa
- Kiyoshi Kurosawa
- Karyn Kusama
- Emir Kusturica
- Geir Ove Kvalheim
- Daniel Kwan
- Stanley Kwan
- Ken Kwapis

Top of page

== L ==
- John La Bouchardière
- Nadine Labaki
- Neil LaBute
- Gregory La Cava
- Harry Lachman
- Aldo Lado
- Edward Laemmle
- James Lafferty
- John Lafia
- René Laloux
- Ringo Lam
- Fernando Lamas
- Mary Lambert
- Charles Lamont
- Lew Landers
- Alejandro Landes
- John Landis
- Max Landis
- Christopher Landon
- Michael Landon
- Sidney Lanfield
- Fritz Lang
- Walter Lang
- Michael Lange
- Rémi Lange
- Doug Langway
- Yorgos Lanthimos
- Claude Lanzmann
- Janez Lapajne
- Victoria Larimore
- Pablo Larraín
- John Lasseter
- Dennis Latos
- Andrew Lau
- Jeffrey Lau
- Peter Lauer
- Michael Laughlin
- Charles Laughton
- Mélanie Laurent
- Carl Lauten
- Arnold Laven
- Diarmuid Lawrence
- Francis Lawrence
- Marc Lawrence
- J. F. Lawton
- Tracie Laymon
- Paul Lazarus
- Philip Leacock
- David Lean
- Patrice Leconte
- Bruce Leddy
- Mimi Leder
- D. Ross Lederman
- Ang Lee
- David Lee
- Lee Chang-dong
- Lee Cheol-ha
- Jennifer Lee
- Lee Lik-Chi
- Rowland V. Lee
- Spike Lee
- Michael Leeston-Smith
- Karenssa LeGear
- Michael Lehmann
- Henry Lehrman
- Larry Leichliter
- Julia Leigh
- Mike Leigh
- Danny Leiner
- Mitchell Leisen
- Logan Leistikow
- David Leitch
- Józef Lejtes
- Claude Lelouch
- Michael Lembeck
- Kasi Lemmons
- John Lemont
- Jay Lender
- Umberto Lenzi
- Robert Z. Leonard
- Damien Leone
- Sergio Leone
- John R. Leonetti
- Tony Leondis
- Robert Lepage
- Peter Lepeniotis
- Louis Le Prince
- Mervyn LeRoy
- Michael Lessac
- George Lessey
- Mark L. Lester
- Richard Lester
- Louis Leterrier
- Jørgen Leth
- Jared Leto
- Rob Letterman
- Barry Letts
- Brian Levant
- Henry Levin
- Ken Levine
- Barry Levinson
- Shawn Levy
- Shuki Levy
- Herschell Gordon Lewis
- Jerry Lewis
- Joseph H. Lewis
- Leonard Lewis
- Phill Lewis
- Paul Lieberstein
- Jonathan Liebesman
- Li Han-Hsiang
- Li Hsing
- Li Yang
- Lee Tit
- Desiree Lim
- Doug Liman
- Brian Limond
- Justin Lin
- Jüri Lina
- Fred J. Lincoln
- Max Linder
- Tobias Lindholm
- Willy Lindwer
- Graham Linehan
- Richard Linklater
- Matt Lipsey
- Oldřich Lipský
- Steven Lisberger
- Miguel Littín
- Dwight H. Little
- Lynne Littman
- Anatole Litvak
- Luis Llosa
- Frank Lloyd
- Norman Lloyd
- Phyllida Lloyd
- Lo Wei
- Ken Loach
- Sondra Locke
- Barbara Loden
- Joshua Logan
- Ulli Lommel
- Richard Loncraine
- Jerry London
- Kenneth Lonergan
- Stanley Long
- Robert Longo
- Matthew López
- Del Lord
- Peter Lord
- Phil Lord
- Ian Lorimer
- Chuck Lorre
- Joseph Losey
- Steve Loter
- Todd Louiso
- Lou Ye
- David Lowery
- Declan Lowney
- Philippa Lowthorpe
- Arthur Lubin
- Ernst Lubitsch
- George Lucas
- John Meredyth Lucas
- Wilfred Lucas
- Edward Ludwig
- Baz Luhrmann
- Sidney Lumet
- Leopold Lummerstorfer
- Kátia Lund
- Ida Lupino
- Rod Lurie
- Teddy Lussi-Modeste
- Don Lusk
- Hamilton Luske
- Dorothy Lyman
- Euros Lyn
- David Lynch
- Jeffrey Lynch
- Jennifer Lynch
- Liam Lynch
- Adrian Lyne
- Jonathan Lynn

Top of page

== M ==
=== Ma–Mc ===
- Adrian Maben
- David MacDonald
- Hettie MacDonald
- Kevin Macdonald
- Carl Macek
- Seth MacFarlane
- Gustav Machatý
- Willard Mack
- Alexander Mackendrick
- David Mackenzie
- Philip Charles MacKenzie
- Will Mackenzie
- Douglas Mackinnon
- Gillies MacKinnon
- Angus MacLane
- Michelle MacLaren
- Murdock MacQuarrie
- John Madden
- Guy Maddin
- Madonna
- Holger-Madsen
- Ivan Magrin-Chagnolleau
- Brendan Maher
- Barry Mahon
- Charles Maigne
- Norman Mailer
- Alan Mak
- Dušan Makavejev
- Mohsen Makhmalbaf
- Samira Makhmalbaf
- Károly Makk
- Sundeep Malani
- Sarah Maldoror
- Terrence Malick
- Louis Malle
- Nicholas Mallett
- William Malone
- David Maloney
- Leo D. Maloney
- Henrik Malyan
- Djibril Diop Mambéty
- Manakis brothers
- Milcho Manchevski
- Don Mancini
- David Mandel
- Chris Mandia
- Luis Mandoki
- James Mangold
- Joseph L. Mankiewicz
- Anthony Mann
- Daniel Mann
- Delbert Mann
- Michael Mann
- Seith Mann
- Guy Manos
- Sophie Marceau
- Terry Marcel
- Max Marcin
- Nick Marck
- Bam Margera
- Antonio Margheriti
- Edwin L. Marin
- José Mojica Marins
- Chris Marker
- Richard Marquand
- Laïla Marrakchi
- James Marsh
- Jeff "Swampy" Marsh
- Frank Marshall
- Garry Marshall
- George Marshall
- Neil Marshall
- Penny Marshall
- Rob Marshall
- Joshua Marston
- Lucrecia Martel
- Becky Martin
- Darnell Martin
- D'Urville Martin
- Henry G. Martin
- Jim Martin
- Murray Martin
- Phillip Martin
- Richard Martin
- Richard Martini
- Sergio Martino
- Steve Martino
- Marco Martins
- Leslie H. Martinson
- Derek Martinus
- Andrew Marton
- Nico Mastorakis
- George Mastras
- Camillo Mastrocinque
- Yasuzo Masumura
- Arūnas Matelis
- Sean Mathias
- Melina Matsoukas
- Katsuya Matsumura
- Bruno Mattei
- Elaine May
- Juliet May
- Russ Mayberry
- Tony Maylam
- Archie Mayo
- Brad Mays
- Dan Mazer
- Paul Mazursky
- Glen Mazzara
- Kenny McBain
- Jim McBride
- Robert McCallum
- Leo McCarey
- Ray McCarey
- Colm McCarthy
- Tom McCarthy
- Brendan McCaul
- Nelson McCormick
- George McCowan
- Craig McCracken
- John Michael McDonagh
- Martin McDonagh
- Frank McDonald
- Terry McDonough
- Charles McDougall
- Bernard McEveety
- Vincent McEveety
- McG
- William C. McGann
- Scott McGehee
- J. P. McGowan
- Robert F. McGowan
- Tom McGrath
- Joseph McGrath
- William McGregor
- Paul McGuigan
- Adam McKay
- Chris McKay
- David McKay
- Jim McKay
- John McKay
- Lucky McKee
- Kevin McKidd
- Norman McLaren
- Greg McLean
- Norman Z. McLeod
- Tom McLoughlin
- Sean McNamara
- John McNaughton
- Daniel McNicoll
- Robert Duncan McNeill
- Steve McQueen
- John McTiernan

Top of page

=== Md–Mz ===
- Shane Meadows
- Peter Medak
- Don Medford
- Dariush Mehrjui
- Deepa Mehta
- Gus Meins
- Fernando Meirelles
- Adolfas Mekas
- Jonas Mekas
- Bill Melendez
- Georges Méliès
- George Melford
- Wilco Melissant
- James Melkonian
- Jeff Melman
- Craig Melville
- Jean-Pierre Melville
- Lothar Mendes
- Sam Mendes
- Jim Mendiola
- Linda Mendoza
- Chris Menges
- Meera Menon
- Stephen Merchant
- E. Elias Merhige
- Saul Metzstein
- Jeff Meyer
- Russ Meyer
- Leah Meyerhoff
- Richard Michaels
- Oscar Micheaux
- Roger Michell
- Pete Michels
- Jim Mickle
- Takashi Miike
- Nikita Mikhalkov
- Lewis Milestone
- John Milius
- Bennett Miller
- Christopher Miller
- Frank Miller
- George Miller
- Kara Miller
- Randall Miller
- Robert Ellis Miller
- Sam Miller
- Sharron Miller
- Sidney Miller
- Tim Miller
- Crispian Mills
- Rusty Mills
- Daniel Minahan
- Steve Miner
- Anthony Minghella
- Joseph Minion
- Rob Minkoff
- Vincente Minnelli
- Eugenio Mira
- Emilio Miraglia
- Lin-Manuel Miranda
- Koki Mitani
- David Robert Mitchell
- Howard M. Mitchell
- John Cameron Mitchell
- Mike Mitchell
- Noël Mitrani
- David Mitton
- Goro Miyazaki
- Hayao Miyazaki
- Kenji Mizoguchi
- Peter Moffatt
- Shahram Mokri
- Alfred Molina
- Josefina Molina
- Édouard Molinaro
- Christine Molloy
- Zac Moncrief
- Mario Monicelli
- Cesar Montano
- Eduardo Montes-Bradley
- Dave Moody
- Lukas Moodysson
- Irving J. Moore
- Michael Moore
- Randy Moore
- Rich Moore
- Robert Moore
- Stan Moore
- Jocelyn Moorhouse
- Ken Mora
- Jacobo Morales
- Pierre Morel
- Nanni Moretti
- Harry Morgan
- Sidney Morgan
- Anders Morgenthaler
- Shuhei Morita
- Chris Morris
- Errol Morris
- Jennifer Morrison
- Vic Morrow
- Hollingsworth Morse
- Terry O. Morse
- Catherine Morshead
- Cynthia Mort
- Edmund Mortimer
- Lemohang Jeremiah Mosese
- Scott Mosier
- Craig Moss
- Katsuyuki Motohiro
- Greg Mottola
- Wagner Moura
- Norbert Moutier
- Allan Moyle
- Otto Muehl
- Russell Mulcahy
- John Mulholland
- Robert Mulligan
- Andrzej Munk
- Kira Muratova
- Walter Murch
- F. W. Murnau
- Dudley Murphy
- Geoff Murphy
- Ralph Murphy
- Ryan Murphy
- Bill Murray
- Noam Murro
- John Musker
- Floyd Mutrux
- Mark Mylod
- Daniel Myrick

Top of page

== N ==
- Amir Naderi
- Kenji Nagasaki
- Mira Nair
- Ilya Naishuller
- Takashi Nakamura
- Hideo Nakata
- Bharat Nalluri
- Michael Nankin
- Silvio Narizzano
- Khodzha Kuli Narliyev
- Mikio Naruse
- Janusz Nasfeter
- Percy Nash
- Matthew Nastuk
- Vincenzo Natali
- Gregory Nava
- Mike Nawrocki
- Doug Naylor
- Ray Nazarro
- Ronald Neame
- Jean Negulesco
- Marshall Neilan
- Roy William Neill
- James Neilson
- Victor Nelli Jr.
- Gary Nelson
- Gene Nelson
- Jessie Nelson
- Ozzie Nelson
- Ralph Nelson
- Max Neufeld
- Kurt Neumann
- Kyle Newacheck
- Mike Newell
- Sam Newfield
- Don Newland
- John Newland
- Joseph Newman
- Fred Newmeyer
- Lionel Ngakane
- Thuc Nguyen
- Fred Niblo
- Andrew Niccol
- George Nicholls Jr.
- Charles August Nichols
- Jeff Nichols
- Mike Nichols
- Jack Nicholson
- Cedric Nicolas-Troyan
- Greg Nicotero
- William Nigh
- Nikos Nikolaidis
- Leopoldo Torre Nilsson
- Rob Nilsson
- Leonard Nimoy
- Marcus Nispel
- David Nixon
- Manfred Noa
- Gaspar Noé
- Christopher Nolan
- Chris Noonan
- Tom Noonan
- Syed Noor
- Paul Norman
- Mabel Normand
- Edward Norton
- Jehane Noujaim
- Cyrus Nowrasteh
- Wilfred Noy
- Phillip Noyce
- Elliott Nugent
- Joe Nunez
- David Nutter
- Bruno Nuytten
- Andy Nwakalor
- Christian Nyby
- Oleksiy-Nestor Naumenko

Top of page

== O ==
- Dave O'Brien
- Katharine O'Brien
- Andrew O'Connor
- Renee O'Connor
- Bob Odenkirk
- Atsushi Ogata
- Perry Ogden
- George Ogilvie
- Kingsley Ogoro
- Izu Ojukwu
- Kihachi Okamoto
- Sidney Olcott
- Liddy Oldroyd
- Jorge Olguín
- Ron Oliver
- Susan Oliver
- Laurence Olivier
- Ermanno Olmi
- Tony Olmos
- Gunnar Olsson
- Max Ophüls
- Joshua Oppenheimer
- Benjamin Orifici
- Kenny Ortega
- Mamoru Oshii
- Nagisa Oshima
- Ruben Östlund
- Richard Oswald
- Dominique Othenin-Girard
- Katsuhiro Otomo
- Ulrike Ottinger
- Idrissa Ouedraogo
- Horace Ové
- André Øvredal
- Jennifer Oxley
- Frank Oz
- François Ozon
- Yasujirō Ozu

Top of page

== P ==
- Sergio Pablos
- Georg Wilhelm Pabst
- P. Padmarajan
- Alan J. Pakula
- György Pálfi
- Ben Palmer
- Charles Palmer
- Jake Paltrow
- Jafar Panahi
- Norman Panama
- Gleb Panfilov
- Pang Ho-Cheung
- Domenico Paolella
- Sergei Parajanov
- K-Michel Parandi
- Jerry Paris
- Dean Parisot
- Lana Parrilla
- Richard Parry
- Park Chan-Wook
- Nick Park
- Alan Parker
- Albert Parker
- Ol Parker
- Trey Parker
- James Parrott
- Reza Parsa
- Kane Parsons
- Gabriel Pascal
- Goran Paskaljević
- Pier Paolo Pasolini
- Ivan Passer
- Stuart Paton
- John Patterson
- Ray Patterson
- Anand Patwardhan
- Frank Paur
- Paweł Pawlikowski
- Alexander Payne
- Leslie Pearce
- Richard Pearce
- Steve Pearlman
- George Pearson
- Raoul Peck
- Sam Peckinpah
- Jordan Peele
- Mark Pellington
- Scott Pembroke
- Arthur Penn
- Leo Penn
- Matthew Penn
- Sean Penn
- Joe Penna
- Ivan Perestiani
- Lester James Peries
- Pierre Perifel
- Loni Peristere
- Anthony Perkins
- Oz Perkins
- Quincy Perkins
- Boruch Perlowitz
- Léonce Perret
- Nat Perrin
- Frank Perry
- Tyler Perry
- Christian Peschken
- Robert O. Peters
- Wolfgang Petersen
- David Petrarca
- Daniel Petrie
- Donald Petrie
- Elio Petri
- Christian Petzold
- Joseph Pevney
- Danny and Michael Philippou
- Todd Phillips
- Maurice Pialat
- Irving Pichel
- Andy Picheta
- Frank Pierson
- Mervyn Pinfield
- Steve Pink
- Lucian Pintilie
- Robert Pirosh
- Noam Pitlik
- Pitof
- René Plaissetty
- Tony Plana
- Bill Plympton
- Jeremy Podeswa
- Ihor Podolchak
- Sidney Poitier
- Roman Polanski
- Dominic Polcino
- Mark Polish
- Michael Polish
- Rudolph Polk
- Kay Pollak
- Sydney Pollack
- Harry A. Pollard
- Lindsey Pollard
- John Polson
- Ellen Pompeo
- Gillo Pontecorvo
- Edwin S. Porter
- Geoff Posner
- Ted Post
- H. C. Potter
- Sally Potter
- Richard Pottier
- Alan Poul
- Dan Povenmire
- Jeff Povey
- Frank Powell
- Michael Powell
- Paul Powell
- Kemp Powers
- Udayan Prasad
- Rosa von Praunheim
- Otto Preminger
- Emeric Pressburger
- Ellen S. Pressman
- Michael Pressman
- Lonny Price
- Sarah Price
- Prince
- Yakov Protazanov
- Alex Proyas
- Aleksandr Ptushko
- Vsevolod Pudovkin
- Jon Puno
- Derek Purvis
- Ivan Pyryev

Top of page

== Q ==
- Farooq Qaiser
- Steven Quale
- Troy Quane
- Brothers Quay
- John Quigley
- Richard Quine
- James Quinn
- Faisal Qureshi
- Nabeel Qureshi

Top of page

== R ==
=== Ra–Re ===
- Peer Raben
- Michael Radford
- Bob Rafelson
- Jeff Ragsdale
- Sam Raimi
- Yvonne Rainer
- Hossein Rajabian
- S. S. Rajamouli
- Sharat Raju
- Harold Ramis
- Julius Ramsay
- Lynne Ramsay
- Tony Randel
- Arthur Rankin Jr.
- Irving Rapper
- Mani Ratnam
- Brett Ratner
- Gregory Ratoff
- John Rawlins
- Albert Ray
- Bernard B. Ray
- Fred Olen Ray
- Man Ray
- Nicholas Ray
- Rick Ray
- Satyajit Ray
- Herman C. Raymaker
- Bobby Razak
- Patrick Rea
- Jim Reardon
- Eric Red
- Robert Redford
- Carol Reed
- Peyton Reed
- Robert Reed
- Dee Rees
- Christopher Reeve
- Keanu Reeves
- Matt Reeves
- Michael Reeves
- Nicolas Winding Refn
- Godfrey Reggio
- Willy Reiber
- Kelly Reichardt
- Daina Reid
- Carl Reiner
- Rob Reiner
- Max Reinhardt
- Irving Reis
- Charles Reisner
- Karel Reisz
- Wolfgang Reitherman
- Ivan Reitman
- Jason Reitman
- Edgar Reitz
- Chris Renaud
- Johan Renck
- Jean Renoir
- Rob Renzetti
- Alain Resnais
- Adam Resnick
- Carlos Reygadas
- Gene Reynolds
- Kevin Reynolds
- Lynn Reynolds

Top of page

=== Rf–Rz ===
- Mike Rianda
- David Lowell Rich
- John Rich
- Tony Richardson
- Hans Richter
- W. D. Richter
- Tom Ricketts
- Leni Riefenstahl
- Ransom Riggs
- Alrick Riley
- Wolf Rilla
- Arthur Ripley
- Arturo Ripstein
- Guy Ritchie
- Michael Ritchie
- Martin Ritt
- Karl Ritter
- Christian Rivers
- Fernand Rivers
- Joan Rivers
- Jacques Rivette
- Jamie Rix
- Parveen Rizvi
- Saeed Rizvi
- Jay Roach
- Alain Robbe-Grillet
- Brian Robbins
- Jerome Robbins
- Tim Robbins
- Brian K. Roberts
- Johannes Roberts
- Pennant Roberts
- Stephen Roberts
- Graham Robertson
- John S. Robertson
- Gillian Robespierre
- Arthur Robison
- Bruce Robinson
- Lee Robinson
- Matthew Robinson (British-Cambodian, born in 1944)
- Matthew Robinson (American, born in 1978)
- Phil Alden Robinson
- Mark Robson
- Adam Robitel
- Glauber Rocha
- Alexandre Rockwell
- João Pedro Rodrigues
- Robert Rodriguez
- Rosemary Rodriguez
- John Roecker
- Nicolas Roeg
- Daniel Roemer
- Michael Roemer
- Albert S. Rogell
- Seth Rogen
- Brandon Rogers
- David Rogers
- Éric Rohmer
- Alice Rohrwacher
- James Rolfe
- Mark Romanek
- George A. Romero
- Joaquín Luis Romero Marchent
- Mikhail Romm
- Am Rong
- Bethany Rooney
- Mickey Rooney
- Cliff Roquemore
- Bernard Rose
- Phil Rosen
- Stuart Rosenberg
- Rick Rosenthal
- Tatia Rosenthal
- Perry Rosemond
- Mark Rosman
- Gary Ross
- Herbert Ross
- Matthew Ross
- Roberto Rossellini
- Robert Rossen
- Franco Rossi
- Arthur Rosson
- Richard Rosson
- Eli Roth
- Joe Roth
- Tim Roth
- Richard Rothstein
- Josie Rourke
- Roy Rowland
- Patricia Rozema
- Joseph Ruben
- Alan Rudolph
- Oscar Rudolph
- Wesley Ruggles
- Demián Rugna
- Raúl Ruiz
- Pavel Ruminov
- Richard Rush
- Chuck Russell
- David O. Russell
- Ken Russell
- Paddy Russell
- Russo brothers
- Stefan Ruzowitzky
- Eldar Ryazanov
- Zbigniew Rybczyński
- Mark Rydell
- Gary Rydstrom
- Stellan Rye
- RZA

Top of page

== S ==
=== Sa–Sh ===
- Maher Sabry
- Daniel Sackheim
- Christopher Sadler
- Numa Sadoul
- Safdie brothers
- Boris Sagal
- Bob Saget
- Abdulkadir Ahmed Said
- Richard Sakai
- Alik Sakharov
- Gene Saks
- Carlos Saldanha
- Sidney Salkow
- Eriq La Salle
- Walter Salles
- Dan Sallitt
- Mikael Salomon
- Anja Salomonowitz
- Victor Salva
- Shakti Samanta
- Gabriela Samper
- Keith Samples
- David F. Sandberg
- Ari Sandel
- Scott Sanders
- Helma Sanders-Brahms
- Jay Sandrich
- Mark Sandrich
- Arlene Sanford
- David Sant
- Alfred Santell
- Joseph Santley
- Damon Santostefano
- Miguel Sapochnik
- Richard C. Sarafian
- Valeria Sarmiento
- Michael Sarnoski
- Peter Sasdy
- Shinsuke Sato
- Yūichi Satō
- Marjane Satrapi
- Charles Saunders (director)
- Hubert Sauper
- Claude Sautet
- Fred Savage
- Rob Savage
- Philip Saville
- Seth Savoy
- Geoffrey Sax
- John Sayles
- Rodo Sayagues
- John Scagliotti
- Armand Schaefer
- George Schaefer
- Akiva Schaffer
- Jeff Schaffer
- Franklin Schaffner
- Peter Schamoni
- James Schamus
- Frank Scheffer
- Daniel Scheinert
- Fred Schepisi
- Victor Schertzinger
- Paul Scheuring
- Kyle Schickner
- Thomas Schlamme
- Craig Schlattman
- John Schlesinger
- Christoph Schlingensief
- Volker Schlöndorff
- David Schmoeller
- Julian Schnabel
- Thomas Schnauz
- Dan Schneider
- Ian Schneider
- Paul Schneider
- Rob Schneider
- Ernest B. Schoedsack
- Jane Schoenbrun
- Renen Schorr
- Paul Schrader
- Liev Schreiber
- Rick Schroder
- Barbet Schroeder
- Werner Schroeter
- John Schultz
- Michael Schultz
- Hugh Schulze
- Joel Schumacher
- Reinhold Schünzel
- Michael Schur
- Lloyd J. Schwartz
- Stefan Schwartz
- Rudolf Schwarzkogler
- Til Schweiger
- Robert Schwentke
- David Schwimmer
- Christian Schwochow
- Ettore Scola
- Martin Scorsese
- Oz Scott
- Ridley Scott
- Shaun Scott
- Swinton O. Scott III
- Tony Scott
- Aubrey Scotto
- Steven Seagal
- Francis Searle
- Fred F. Sears
- Eric Dean Seaton
- George Seaton
- Edward Sedgwick
- Alex Segal
- Peter Segal
- Susan Seidelman
- Ulrich Seidl
- Lewis Seiler
- William A. Seiter
- Franz Seitz, Sr.
- George Seitz
- Steve Sekely
- Lesley Selander
- Henry Selick
- Bill Sellars
- Herbert Selpin
- Aaron Seltzer
- David Seltzer
- Selvaraghavan
- Edgar Selwyn
- Ousmane Sembène
- David Semel
- Larry Semon
- Mrinal Sen
- Dominic Sena
- Lorraine Senna
- Mack Sennett
- Craig Serling
- Menelik Shabazz
- Tom Shadyac
- Matt Shakman
- Lee Shallat Chemel
- S. Shankar
- Adam Shankman
- John Patrick Shanley
- Ted Sharks
- Tristram Shapeero
- Parvez Sharma
- Jim Sharman
- William Shatner
- Melville Shavelson
- Jenn Shaw
- Larry Shaw
- Scott Shaw
- Jack Shea
- Barry Shear
- Chuck Sheetz
- Lynn Shelton
- Millicent Shelton
- Ron Shelton
- Darren Shepherd
- Larisa Shepitko
- Adrian Shergold
- Jim Sheridan
- Kirsten Sheridan
- Rondell Sheridan
- Taylor Sheridan
- Gary Sherman
- George Sherman
- Lowell Sherman
- Vincent Sherman
- Domee Shi
- John Shiban
- Steve Shill
- Takashi Shimizu
- Peter Shin
- Shin Sang-ok
- Naoyoshi Shiotani
- Alexandra Shiva
- Jack Sholder
- Cate Shortland
- Michael Showalter
- Wil Shriner
- Trey Edward Shults
- M. Night Shyamalan
- Charles Shyer
- Justin Simien
- Joe Simon

Top of page

=== Si–Sz ===
- George Sidney
- Scott Sidney
- David Siegel
- Don Siegel
- Ted Sieger
- Pedro Sienna
- Floria Sigismondi
- Slobodan Šijan
- Brad Silberling
- David Silverman
- Dean Silvers
- Lisa Simon
- S. Sylvan Simon
- Yves Simoneau
- Giorgio Simonelli
- Alexander Singer
- Bryan Singer
- Grant Singer
- Manmohan Singh
- Tarsem Singh
- Tony Singletary
- John Singleton
- Roger Singleton-Turner
- Robert Siodmak
- Puneet Sira
- Douglas Sirk
- Cheick Oumar Sissoko
- Andrea Sisson
- Chris Sivertson
- Tom Six
- Vilgot Sjöman
- Victor Sjöström
- Kari Skogland
- Jerzy Skolimowski
- Gia Skova
- David Slade
- Paul Sloane
- Edward Sloman
- Michael Slovis
- Yannis Smaragdis
- Alan Smart
- Ralph Smart
- Jack Smight
- Adam Smith
- Brian Trenchard-Smith
- Charles Martin Smith
- Christopher Smith
- David Smith
- Gary Smith
- George Albert Smith
- Harry Everett Smith
- Jim Field Smith
- John Smith
- John N. Smith
- Julia Smith
- Kevin Smith
- Michael V. Smith
- Noel M. Smith
- Roy Allen Smith
- Sarah Smith
- Seth Grahame-Smith
- Simon J. Smith
- Adam Smoluk
- Michael Snow
- Zack Snyder
- Michele Soavi
- Steven Soderbergh
- Iain Softley
- Gennady Sokolsky
- Aleksandr Sokurov
- David Solomon
- Frances-Anne Solomon
- Todd Solondz
- Andrew Solt
- Stephen Sommers
- Barry Sonnenfeld
- Sion Sono
- Celine Song
- Chris Soriano
- Paolo Sorrentino
- Jen and Sylvia Soska
- Tressie Souders
- Simon Spencer
- George Spenton-Foster
- Jaap Speyer
- Penelope Spheeris
- Bryan Spicer
- Steven Spielberg
- Götz Spielmann
- Spierig brothers
- Bob Spiers
- Roger Spottiswoode
- Jill Sprecher
- Alejandro Springall
- Aaron Springer
- R. G. Springsteen
- Anthony Stacchi
- John M. Stahl
- Sylvester Stallone
- Andrew Stanton
- Wendey Stanzler
- Ladislas Starevich
- Jack Starrett
- Richard Starzak
- Ralph Staub
- Malcolm St. Clair
- J.A. Steel
- Burr Steers
- Jefferson Stein
- Paul L. Stein
- David Steinberg
- Hans Steinhoff
- Steno (director)
- Boris Stepantsev
- Mike Stephens
- Jared Stern
- Sandor Stern
- Steven Hilliard Stern
- Andrew Stevens
- Dan Stevens
- George Stevens
- George Stevens Jr.
- Robert Stevens
- Robert Stevenson
- Gordon Stewart
- Ginny Stikeman
- Ben Stiller
- Mauritz Stiller
- Whit Stillman
- Francis Stokes
- Marcus Stokes
- Mike Stoklasa
- Nicholas Stoller
- Benjamin Stoloff
- Andrew L. Stone
- Ezra Stone
- Jamie Magnus Stone
- Matt Stone
- Oliver Stone
- Tad Stones
- Howard Storm
- Jerome Storm
- Jean-Marie Straub
- Frank R. Strayer
- Amanda Street
- Graham Streeter
- Barbra Streisand
- Brenda Strong
- James Strong
- John Stroud
- Mel Stuart
- Gene Stupnitsky
- John Sturges
- Preston Sturges
- K. Subash
- Arne Sucksdorff
- Elia Suleiman
- Sun Yu
- Mohit Suri
- Stephen Surjik
- A. Edward Sutherland
- Hal Sutherland
- Kiefer Sutherland
- Seijun Suzuki
- Jan Švankmajer
- Mary Sweeney
- Harry Sweet
- Justin Swibel
- David Swift
- Hans-Jürgen Syberberg
- Khady Sylla
- István Szabó
- Peter Szewczyk
- Damián Szifron
- Małgorzata Szumowska

Top of page

== T ==
- Rachel Talalay
- Patrick Tam
- Lee Tamahori
- Emma Tammi
- Cyndi Tang
- Alain Tanner
- Danis Tanović
- Quentin Tarantino
- Andrei Tarkovsky
- Béla Tarr
- Genndy Tartakovsky
- Frank Tashlin
- Jacques Tati
- Norman Taurog
- Bertrand Tavernier
- Alan Taylor
- Don Taylor
- Don Taylor
- Ray Taylor
- Sam Taylor
- Stanner E.V. Taylor
- William Desmond Taylor
- Colin Teague
- Lewis Teague
- André Téchiné
- Julien Temple
- Suzie Templeton
- Larry Teng
- Andy Tennant
- George Terwilliger
- Hiroshi Teshigahara
- Duccio Tessari
- Ted Tetzlaff
- Kirk Thatcher
- Wilhelm Thiele
- Gerald Thomas
- John G. Thomas
- Ralph Thomas
- Bernard Thompson
- Caroline Thompson
- J. Lee Thompson
- Tommy Thompson
- Robert Thornby
- Billy Bob Thornton
- Richard Thorpe
- Rawson Marshall Thurber
- Tian Zhuangzhuang
- Paul Tibbitt
- Greg Tiernan
- George Tillman Jr.
- Constance Tillotson
- Tony Tilse
- Mihai Timofti
- Bruce Timm
- James Tinling
- Phil Tippett
- Justin Tipping
- Romeo Tirone
- Johnnie To
- James Toback
- Norman Tokar
- Jan Tománek
- Mattson Tomlin
- Liesl Tommy
- Mark Tonderai
- Aad van Toor
- Hisayuki Toriumi
- Giuseppe Tornatore
- Miguel Contreras Torres
- Ivan Tors
- André de Toth
- Laurent Touil-Tartour
- Viktor Tourjansky
- Jacques Tourneur
- Maurice Tourneur
- Robert Townsend
- Frederick E.O. Toye
- Wendy Toye
- David Trainer
- David Owen Trainor
- Josh Trank
- Pablo Trapero
- Pete Travis
- Scott Treleaven
- Jeff Tremaine
- Brian Trenchard-Smith
- Jesús Salvador Treviño
- Colin Trevorrow
- Joachim Trier
- Justine Triet
- Laurence Trimble
- Nadine Trintignant
- Ian Tripp
- Jan Troell
- Alice Troughton
- Gary Trousdale
- Keith Truesdell
- François Truffaut
- Ming-liang Tsai
- Peter Tscherkassky
- Tsui Hark
- Shinya Tsukamoto
- Stanley Tucci
- Anand Tucker
- Rex Tucker
- Gary J. Tunnicliffe
- Brad Turner
- Jon Turteltaub
- Frank Tuttle
- David Twohy
- Chris Twomey
- Michael Tyburski
- Tom Tykwer
- Morten Tyldum
- George Tyne
- George Tzavellas

Top of page

== U ==
- Gustav Ucicky
- Edgar G. Ulmer
- Ron Underwood
- Lee Unkrich
- Upendra
- Michael Uppendahl
- Urszula Urbaniak
- Carl Urbano
- Chano Urueta
- Syed Ali Raza Usama
- Carly Usdin
- Kinka Usher
- Peter Ustinov
- Roar Uthaug

Top of page

== V ==
- Roger Vadim
- Ladislao Vajda
- Luis Valdez
- Steve Valentine
- Tonino Valerii
- Mike Valerio
- Jean-Marc Vallée
- Jackie van Beek
- W. S. Van Dyke
- Andre van Heerden
- Buddy Van Horn
- Erik Van Looy
- Tim Van Patten
- Mario Van Peebles
- Melvin Van Peebles
- Thurop Van Orman
- Gus Van Sant
- Florestano Vancini
- Norman Thaddeus Vane
- Vanelle
- Sébastien Vaniček
- Carlo Vanzina
- Agnès Varda
- Giuseppe Vari
- Ram Gopal Varma
- Marcel Varnel
- Petar B. Vasilev
- Tom Vaughan
- Matthew Vaughn
- Joe Vaux
- Pam Veasey
- Perry N. Vekroff
- Milo Ventimiglia
- Gore Verbinski
- Tristan de Vere Cole
- Paul Verhoeven
- Dziga Vertov
- Charles Vidor
- King Vidor
- Berthold Viertel
- Robert G. Vignola
- Jean Vigo
- Vijayakrishnan
- Agusti Villaronga
- Denis Villeneuve
- Robert Vince
- Thomas Vinterberg
- Phil Vischer
- Luchino Visconti
- Biju Viswanath
- K. Viswanath
- Jordan Vogt-Roberts
- Géza von Bolváry
- Géza von Cziffra
- Daisy von Scherler Mayer
- Josef von Sternberg
- Erich von Stroheim
- Lars von Trier
- Margarethe von Trotta
- Dylan Verrechia
- Bernard Vorhaus
- Slavko Vorkapić
- Kurt Voss
- Jürgen Vsych

Top of page

== W ==
- The Wachowskis
- Michael Wadleigh
- Wai Ka-Fai
- Rupert Wainwright
- Taika Waititi
- Andrzej Wajda
- Chris Walas
- John Walker
- Stuart Walker
- David Wall
- William Wall
- Randall Wallace
- Richard Wallace
- Tommy Lee Wallace
- Herb Wallerstein
- Tom Walls
- Aisling Walsh
- Dearbhla Walsh
- Raoul Walsh
- Charles Walters
- Christoph Waltz
- Wan brothers
- James Wan
- Sam Wanamaker
- Lulu Wang
- Wang Quan'an
- Wang Xiaoshuai
- Wayne Wang
- Albert Ward
- David S. Ward
- Vincent Ward
- Ernest C. Warde
- Andy Warhol
- Alan Wareing
- Alex van Warmerdam
- David Warren
- Harold P. Warren
- Norman J. Warren
- Denzel Washington
- Darrell Wasyk
- John Waters
- Mark Waters
- Peter Watkins
- Jon Watts
- Ric Roman Waugh
- Scott Waugh
- Michael Waxman
- Keenen Ivory Wayans
- Carl Weathers
- Sean Weathers
- Kenneth Webb
- Marc Webb
- Millard Webb
- Lois Weber
- Chris Wedge
- Peter Weibel
- Paul Weiland
- Ed. Weinberger
- Clay Weiner
- Hans Weingartner
- Bob Weinstein
- Harvey Weinstein
- Peter Weir
- Don Weis
- Sam Weisman
- D. B. Weiss
- Glenn Weiss
- Helmut Weiss
- Chris Weitz
- Paul Weitz
- Bo Welch
- Orson Welles
- Arthur Wellin
- Dean Wellins
- William Wellman
- Charlotte Wells
- Simon Wells
- Brian Welsh
- Wim Wenders
- Alfred L. Werker
- Lina Wertmüller
- Roland West
- Simon West
- Ti West
- Tanya Wexler
- James Whale
- Frank Whaley
- Leopold Wharton
- Joyce Wieland
- Leigh Whannell
- Theodore Wharton
- Ken and Jim Wheat
- Ben Wheatley
- Joss Whedon
- Tim Whelan
- Dean White
- Eddie White
- Mike White
- Susanna White
- Ken Whittingham
- Richard Whorf
- Kanchi Wichmann
- Bernhard Wicki
- Robert B. Weide
- Hans Weidemann
- Bo Widerberg
- Virgil Widrich
- Ken Wiederhorn
- Erin Wiedner
- Robert Wiene
- Crane Wilbur
- Herbert Wilcox
- Cornel Wilde
- Olivia Wilde
- Ted Wilde
- Billy Wilder
- Gene Wilder
- W. Lee Wilder
- Gordon Wiles
- Diane Wilkins
- Irvin Willat
- Adim Williams
- Chris Williams
- Michael Williams
- Paul Andrew Williams
- Richard Williams
- Roger Ross Williams
- Stephen Williams
- Dennis Willis
- Gordon Willis
- Paul Wilmshurst
- Hugh Wilson
- Patrick Wilson
- Rex Wilson
- Scott Winant
- Simon Wincer
- Bretaigne Windust
- Adam Wingard
- Henry Winkler
- Irwin Winkler
- Max Winkler
- Michael Winner
- David Winning
- Michael Winterbottom
- Tommy Wirkola
- Frank Wisbar
- Kirk Wise
- Robert Wise
- Tommy Wiseau
- Frederick Wiseman
- Len Wiseman
- Doris Wishman
- Chester Withey
- William Witney
- Alexander Witt
- George C. Wolfe
- Art Wolff
- Jason Woliner
- Andy Wolk
- James Wong
- Wong Jing
- Wong Kar-wai
- John Woo
- Andrés Wood
- Ed Wood
- Ivor Wood
- Sam Wood
- Jeremy Wooding
- Arthur B. Woods
- Kate Woods
- Stephen Woolfenden
- John Griffith Wray
- Edgar Wright
- Joe Wright
- Mack V. Wright
- Julius Wu
- Rupert Wyatt
- William Wyler
- Robert Wynne-Simmons
- Jim Wynorski

Top of page

== X ==
- Xie Jin
- Xie Fei

Top of page

== Y ==
- Boaz Yakin
- Edward Yang
- Ruby Yang
- Jean Yarbrough
- Tom Yasumi
- David Yates
- Hal Yates
- Peter Yates
- Reggie Yates
- Irvin S. Yeaworth Jr.
- Derek Yee
- Ray Yeung
- Özgür Yıldırım
- Lev Yilmaz
- Wayne Yip
- Wilson Yip
- Eugen York
- Bud Yorkin
- Yaky Yosha
- Yamada Youji
- Harold Young
- James Young
- Terence Young
- Yuen Woo-ping
- Yugander V. V.
- Brian Yuzna
- Jake Yuzna

Top of page

== Z ==
- Romas Zabarauskas
- Jeremiah Zagar
- Eduard Zahariev
- Alex Zakrzewski
- Jerry Zaks
- Alex Zamm
- Moisés Zamora
- Rudy Zamora
- Krzysztof Zanussi
- Alan Zaslove
- Kristi Zea
- Dan Zeff
- Franco Zeffirelli
- Sande Zeig
- Alfred Zeisler
- Benh Zeitlin
- Primo Zeglio
- Florian Zeller
- David Zellner
- Frederic Zelnik
- Robert Zemeckis
- David Zennie
- Hans H. Zerlett
- Zhang Yang
- Zhang Yimou
- Zhang Yuan
- Zheng Junli
- Thierry Zéno
- Chloé Zhao
- Maheen Zia
- Howard Zieff
- Želimir Žilnik
- Lydia Zimmermann
- Michael Zinberg
- Fred Zinnemann
- Craig Zisk
- Randy Zisk
- Thishiwe Ziqubu
- Rob Zombie
- Erick Zonca
- Hisham Zreiq
- Zucker Brothers
- Steve Zuckerman
- Andrzej Żuławski
- Xawery Żuławski
- Ezz El-Dine Zulficar
- Mahmoud Zulfikar
- Harald Zwart
- Edward Zwick
- Joel Zwick
- Terry Zwigoff

Top of page

== See also ==
- List of film director and cinematographer collaborations
- List of film director and composer collaborations
- List of Spaghetti Western directors
