= Cring =

Cring or CRing may refer to:

- Commutative ring, a concept in mathematics abbreviated as CRing
  - In particular, a notation for the category of commutative rings
- Crîng park, Buzău, Romania
- Jon Russell Cring, an American director
- An item in the online children's game Cartoon Orbit
- A misspelling of cringe

C ring may refer to:

- C Ring, of Saturn
- Carbon ring, in chemistry
- Cock ring
