= Randal Kirk II =

American film director

- Education: University of Denver
- Occupation: Film director

Randal Kirk II is an American film director, writer, producer, and cinematographer.

== Career ==
Kirk graduated from the University of Denver with a BA in 2006. His first job out of college was work for ManiaTV!. In 2009 producing for the company the pilot project Homeless Real World. In 2010, he was the director and producer of the short film Pawned, which was a Golden Duck award nominee for Best Short Narrative at the 2010 Beijing Film Festival. He has directed music videos for King Fantastic's songs On Q and Why? Where? What?, and the video for Matt Zarley's song WTF. He also directed and produced the video for The Saga of Dirty Street Kids by The Pirate Signal. In 2011 he directed the short film The Working Man.

In 2012 Kirk directed and created the story for the feature film DGK: Parental Advisory, which according to ESPN, is "based on the adventures of a group of kids as they bump into the DGK riders", with the kids representing "younger versions of the DGK team". Kirk wrote much of the script for DGK: Parental Advisory, describing it as "a ghetto fairy tale that takes place inside the mind of the DGK rider Baby Scumbag aka Steven Fernandez". The film was nominated for the 2013 TransWorld SKATEboarding Award for best skateboarding video.

In 2013 Kirk directed the branded short skate film Casio Team G-Shock Stevie Williams Featuring G-Steel.
