= Vanelle =

American actress

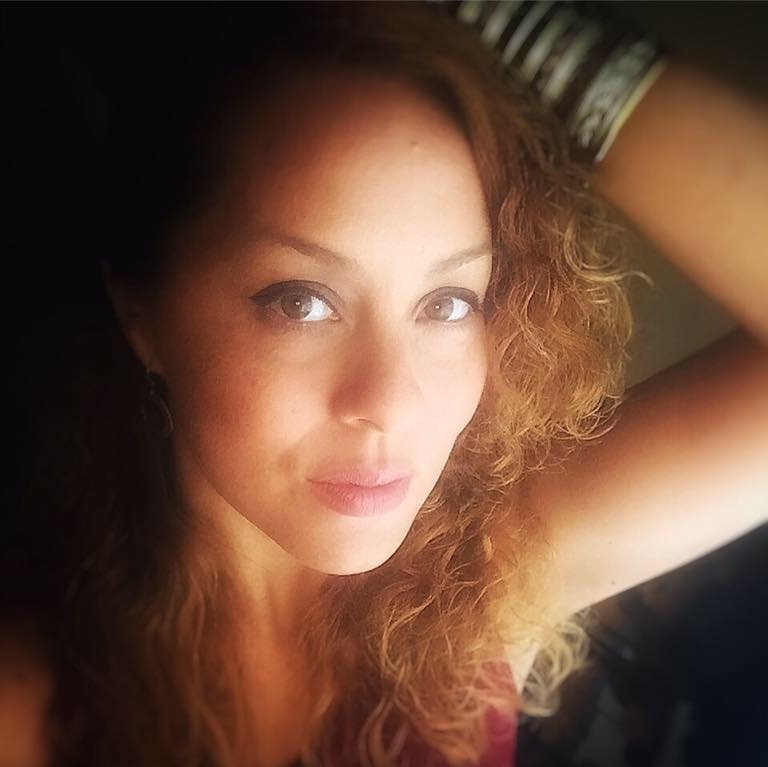
- Self Portrait
- Born: Vanelle Lyn LeBlanc; Oakland, California
- Occupations: Actor, director, writer, online producer
- Known for: Remnants & Spades
- Height: 5 ft 4 in (163 cm)
- Parent(s): Wayne LeBlanc and Van Luong
- Awards: Best Supporting Actress "Dirt Cheap Therapy" Action ON Film Festival (2012) Best Special Effects "Spades" Electric City Fright Fest (2012)

Vanelle is an American actress, writer, director, producer, and model.

Born in Oakland, California, Vanelle moved to Charlotte, North Carolina in 1999 where she officially began her career in film. She earned Best Supporting Actress in a Feature Film at the 2012 Action on Film Fest in Monrovia, California, for her role as Julia in Dirt Cheap Therapy. She was also nominated at the 2015 Action on Film Fest for Best Actress in Athena. Vanelle also has written and directed two short films that circulated film festivals. Her short film Spades received various nominations and garnered awards.

Vanelle was born to Wayne and Van (Luong) LeBlanc and raised in the Bay Area of Northern California. She is of Acadian French and Vietnamese descent, being first generation American on her maternal side.

Vanelle has starred in many films including Exhibit A-7, See the Dead, Remnants and Dark Awakenings. She moonlights as the Horror Host for Muticia's Movie Morgue under the name, Muticia the Movie Goddess and makes guest appearances at Horror and Fantasy conventions. Vanelle writes and produces her own online show called The V-Spot and has two short films, Inheriting the Earth and Spades, under her production company Magic Tribe Pictures. She is currently producing content for The Maiden Network; The QC and Maiden Fitness.

Vanelle has appeared in many commercials both regionally and nationally. She has been the Spokesperson for Hickory Furniture Mart since 2011. In 2012 Vanelle was interviewed on the Lifetime Channel morning show, The Balancing Act, for her starring role as Gwen in the feature film Remnants which also starred Robert Pralgo, Adam Minarovich and Tom Sizemore.
