= Ivan Magrin-Chagnolleau =

American actor

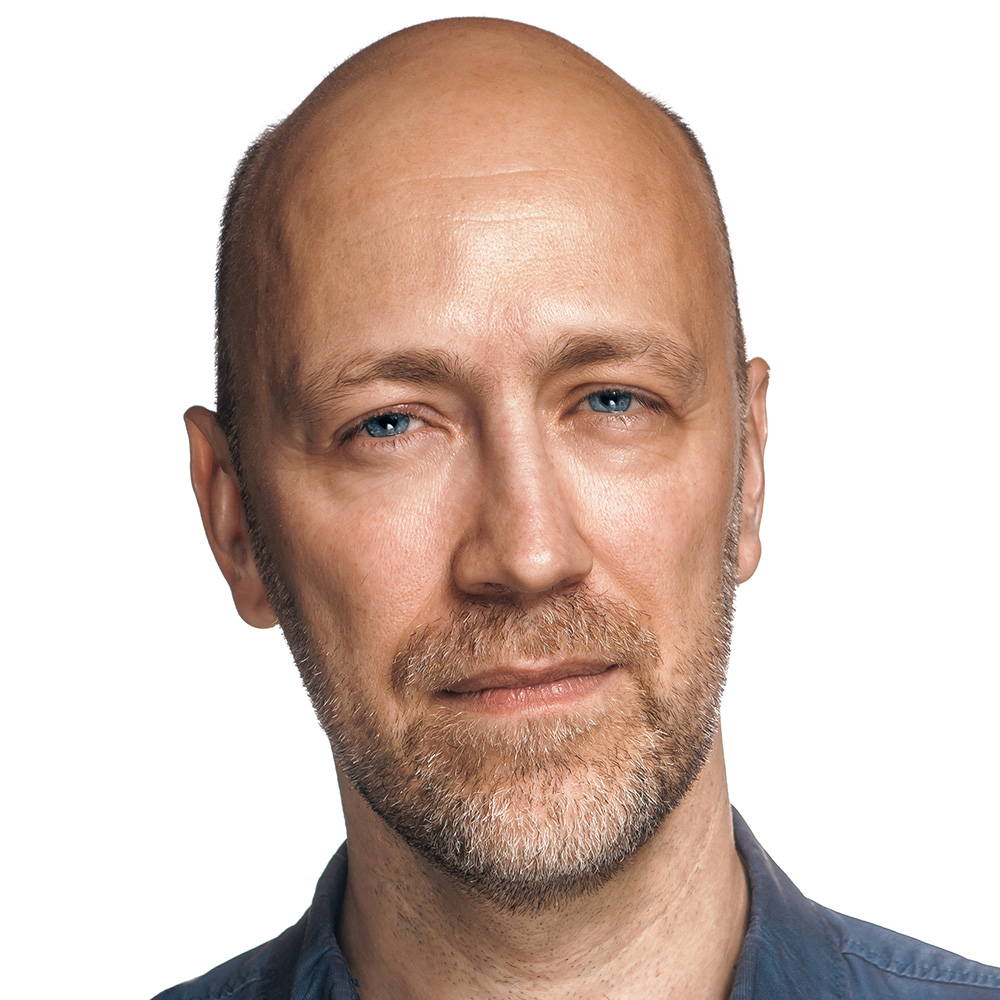
Portrait of Ivan Magrin-Chagnolleau

Ivan Magrin-Chagnolleau is an artist and a philosopher born in Paris, France. He is a stage and screen actor, director, and writer, as well as a photographer, a singer, and a musician. He also does research on philosophy, including aesthetics and philosophy of art for the C.N.R.S. (the French National Center for Scientific Research), currently at the PRISM Laboratory.

== Biography ==
=== Training years ===
Ivan Magrin-Chagnolleau was trained in research in Paris and got his Ph.D. from the E.N.S.T. He worked first on voice and language technologies, and more particularly on systems that recognize people from their voice. He was also trained in linguistics, phonetics, and psychology. He then got his first position with the C.N.R.S. (the French National Center for Scientific Research) in Lyon, France, to work in a research lab specialized in Linguistics.

Ivan Magrin-Chagnolleau was also trained as an artist. He studied music, and more particularly piano and singing, with various private teachers. He co-founded the vocal group Ut Musica Poesis, a group that gave many concerts of Middle Age and Renaissance music. He sang the tenor parts with the group for six years. He also sang the tenor parts in the Vocal Group Françoise Herr for two years. He studied photography at the École des Beaux-Arts in Rennes, and drawing at the École Nationale Supérieure des Beaux-Arts in Paris.

While he was in Lyon, he co-founded the Padrivantia Company. The company gave several concerts and created a musical, Diabolus in Musica. Ivan also took acting classes with Élisabeth Saint-Blancat at the Théâtre des Clochards Célestes, in Lyon. He was then trained as an actor and a director at the Actors Studio Drama School in New York for three years.

=== Professional development ===
Ivan Magrin-Chagnolleau then took a new position with C.N.R.S. in a research lab doing research on Art (The ACTE Institute, a joint lab between C.N.R.S. and Paris 1 Sorbonne-Pantheon University). He founded and headed (from May 2010 to December 2015) a research department in Aesthetics of Performing and Visual Arts (EsPAS). He also founded and is Editor-in-Chief of the journal p-e-r-f-o-r-m-a-n-c-e.

He founded his theater company, the Aloha Company, and produces and directs shows regularly. He continued to play regularly on stage and in film. He wrote his first plays and screenplays, and led a screenwriter circle for several years. He founded his production company, Aloha Films, to produce and direct his first short films.

== Theater, opera, and musicals ==
Stage Actor

- 2004: Role of The Vagabond in the musical Diabolus In Musica created by the Padrivantia Company with the help of Elisabeth Saint-Blancat (Lead)
- 2005: Role of The Aristocrat in The Blue Room by David Hare, directed by Marcia Haufrecht (Lead)
- 2006: Role of Doctor Horst, psychologist for dogs, in the comedy Appetite by Caren Skibell, directed by Layne Racowsky
- 2006: Several roles in Black Snow by Keith Reddin, directed by Glynis Rigsby
- 2007: Role of Hermes and The King Alcinous in The Odyssey by Mary Zimmerman, directed by Allegra Pickett
- 2007: Role of Lawrence, Death Messenger, in Death and the Maiden, by Susan Kim, directed by Brian Cichocki (Lead)
- 2007: Role of The Husband in Uncle, comedy by Jonny et Troy Schremmer, directed by Ron Leibman (Lead)
- 2010: Role of The Professor in The Lesson (La Leçon) by Eugène Ionesco (Lead)
- 2011: Five male roles in The Blue Room by David Hare, directed by Colin Reese

Singer

- 1990-1996: Soloist in the vocal group Ut Musica Poesis, musical direction by Frédéric Albou
- 1993-1996: Soloist in the Françoise Herr vocal group
- 2004: Chansons divines et démoniaques, concert by the Padrivantia Company (sings several songs)
- 2004: Role of The Vagabond in the musical Diabolus In Musica created by the Padrivantia Company with the help of Elisabeth Saint-Blancat (Lead)
- 2006: Jazz Cabaret Christmas at Sweet Rhythm directed by Kenneth Kamal Scott (sings several Jazz Standards)
- 2007: Musical Theater Cabaret 151 Cabaret directed by Keith Buhl (sings several songs from Miss Saigon and The Secret Garden)
- 2014: Musical Theater Recital accompanied on the piano by Ludivine Dubos.

Playwright

- 2004: Diabolus In Musica (musical)
- 2010: If Only You Could Hear Me...
- 2017: Missed Opportunities, part of the show Choices produced at The Lucid Body House in New York in May 2017 as a benefit for the victims of the terrorist attacks in Paris

Stage director

- 2004: The musical Les soeurs pâquerettes created by Myriam Masson and Marion Chomier (New Work)
- 2004: The musical Diabolus In Musica created by the Padrivantia Company with the help of Elisabeth Saint-Blancat (New Work)
- 2004: The Just: Act IV by Albert Camus
- 2005: Exile Here by Paul DeSenna (New Work)
- 2006: Hospice by Pearl Cleage
- 2006: Hill by Amy Schultz (New Work)
- 2006: An Honest Arrangement by David Wiener - best play award and best actor award at the American Globe Theater festival, in New York (New York Premiere)
- 2007: Cuba, Si! by Terrence McNally
- 2009: The Opera-Play The Choice of Hercules (Le choix d'Hercule) by Hippolyte Wouters at the Coté Cour Aix-en-Provence Festival (French Premiere)
- 2010: Experimental Theater From Chaos to Creation with the University of Évry and the Agora Theater in Évry (New Work)
- 2010: The Lesson (La Leçon) by Eugène Ionesco
- 2011: Magical and Ecological Fairy Tales by Éliane Arnoldy (New Work)
- 2013: First Love by Samuel Beckett
- 2017: Choices produced at The Lucid Body House in New York in May 2017 as a benefit for the victims of the terrorist attacks in Paris

Light Designer

- 2004: The musical Diabolus In Musica created by the Padrivantia Company with the help of Elisabeth Saint-Blancat (New Work)
- 2004: The Just: Act IV by Albert Camus
- 2005: Exile Here by Paul DeSenna (New Work)
- 2006: Hospice by Pearl Cleage
- 2006: Hill by Amy Schultz (New Work)
- 2006: An Honest Arrangement by David Wiener - best play award and best actor award at the American Globe Theater festival, in New York (New York Premiere)
- 2010: Zoroastre by Jean-Philippe Rameau
- 2013: First Love by Samuel Beckett

Producer

- 2009: The Opera-Play The Choice of Hercules (Le choix d'Hercule) by Hippolyte Wouters at the Coté Cour Aix-en-Provence Festival (French Premiere) - The Orange Blue Company, Opera 94 and Baroques Graffiti
- 2010: The Lesson (La Leçon) by Eugène Ionesco - The Orange Blue Company
- 2011: Magical and Ecological Fairy Tales by Éliane Arnoldy (New Work) - The Orange Blue Company
- 2011: The Blue Room by David Hare - Words Up and The Orange Blue Company
- 2013: First Love by Samuel Beckett - The Orange Blue Company
- 2017: Choices produced at The Lucid Body House in New York in May 2017 as a benefit for the victims of the terrorist attacks in Paris

== Filmography ==
Film Actor

- 2003: Jeux de haute société by Fabrice du Peloux and Pierre Bernier: A man in black - short film corner in Cannes 2005
- 2004: An Ordinary Afternoon (Un après-midi ordinaire): The man (Lead) - written and directed for the C.N.R.S. (the French National Center for Scientific Research) for a research project on sign language
- 2004: Blanc by Pierre Bernier and Fabrice du Peloux: A nurse - short film corner in Cannes 2005
- 2004: Mrs. Murphy by Nicolas Vivien : Edward Murphy
- 2004: Vaccin contre l'entourage by Christopher Prost : Jesus
- 2005: Amniotic Trip by Pablo Goldbarg: The man (Lead)
- 2005: Ten Steps by Pablo Goldbarg: The Man (Lead) - official selection of the 11th Los Angeles Latino International Film Festival in 2007
- 2006: Romance Larghetto by Pablo Goldbarg: The husband (Lead)
- 2007: Mask Project Vol. 1 by Jonathan Ashley: The man (Lead)
- 2008: El Hombre Muerto by Adriana Calvo: The man (Lead) - short film corner in Cannes
- 2012: Death of a Tune by Vinayak Radhakrishnana: Grégory Dupont (Lead)
- 2013: Party Time! (C'est la fête !): The man (Lead) - short film corner in Cannes - official selection of the 2014 Parisian Seasons Festival at Saint-Petersburg, Russia
- 2013: King Cake (La Galette des Rois): The Homeless Guy (Lead) - short film corner in Cannes - official selection of the 2014 Parisian Seasons Festival at Saint-Petersburg, Russia
- 2013: Nomen Mysticum by Florian Mazier: Hacha (Lead) - short film corner in Cannes
- 2015: The Chips are Down by Adrien Jeuffrain: Mr. Bartoli (Lead)
- 2015: Insomnium by Slimane Lalami: Sandman (Lead)
- 2017: Roomies (Colocs) by Ivan Magrin-Chagnolleau & Florian Mazier: Pierre (Lead)
- 2018: Violet Barrette by Junyi Zhu: Louis (Lead)

Voice

- 2010: French voice of Vilmar Dal Toè in Beyond The Light by Ivy Goulart (Lead)

Screenwriter

- 2010: Waiting (L'attente) (short film)
- 2010: Saturnin (feature film)
- 2011: If Only You Could Hear Me... (short film)
- 2011: Coma Man (series) with Florian Mazier
- 2013: The Elevator (short film)
- 2013: Party Time! (C'est la fête !) (short film) - short film corner in Cannes - official selection of the 2014 Parisian Seasons Festival at Saint-Petersburg, Russia
- 2017: Roomies (Colocs) with Florian Mazier
- 2018: Missed Opportunities (short film) - adapted from the play

Composer

- 2005: Theme music of Never Forever (short film directed by Emmanuella Aristil)
- 2013: Music of King Cake (La Galette des Rois) (short film) - short film corner in Cannes - official selection of the 2014 Parisian Seasons Festival at Saint-Petersburg, Russia
- 2017: Music of Roomies (Colocs)

Cinematographer

- 2004: An Ordinary Afternoon (Un après-midi ordinaire) (short film) - written and directed for the C.N.R.S. (the French National Center for Scientific Research) for a research project on sign language
- 2013: Party Time! (C'est la fête !) (short film) - short film corner in Cannes - official selection of the 2014 Parisian Seasons Festival at Saint-Petersburg, Russia
- 2017: Roomies (Colocs)

Editor

- 2004: An Ordinary Afternoon (Un après-midi ordinaire) (short film) - written and directed for the C.N.R.S. (the French National Center for Scientific Research) for a research project on sign language
- 2013: Party Time! (C'est la fête !) (short film) - short film corner in Cannes - official selection of the 2014 Parisian Seasons Festival at Saint-Petersburg, Russia
- 2013: King Cake (La Galette des Rois) (short film) - short film corner in Cannes - official selection of the 2014 Parisian Seasons Festival at Saint-Petersburg, Russia
- 2013: Nomen Mysticum (short film by Florian Mazier) - short film corner in Cannes
- 2017: Roomies (Colocs)

Film Director

- 2004: An Ordinary Afternoon (Un après-midi ordinaire) (short film) - written and directed for the C.N.R.S. (the French National Center for Scientific Research) for a research project on sign language
- 2013: Party Time! (C'est la fête !) (short film) - short film corner in Cannes - official selection of the 2014 Parisian Seasons Festival at Saint-Petersburg, Russia
- 2013: King Cake (La Galette des Rois) (short film) - short film corner in Cannes - official selection of the 2014 Parisian Seasons Festival at Saint-Petersburg, Russia
- 2017: Roomies (Colocs) with Florian Mazier

First assistant director

- 2006: Romance Larghetto directed by Pablo Goldbarg
- 2007: Wonderland directed by Carlos Leal

Producer

- 2013: Party Time! (C'est la fête !) (short film) - short film corner in Cannes - official selection of the 2014 Parisian Seasons Festival at Saint-Petersburg, Russia
- 2013: King Cake (La Galette des Rois) (short film) - short film corner in Cannes - official selection of the 2014 Parisian Seasons Festival at Saint-Petersburg, Russia
- 2013: Nomen Mysticum (short film) - short film corner in Cannes
- 2017: Roomies (Colocs)
