= Cringe =

Cringe may refer to:

- Cringe culture, an online culture of mocking "cringeworthy" content
- The Cringe, a U.S. rock band
- Cringe comedy, a comedy genre
- Cringe pop, a genre of pop music

== See also ==
- Cringer, American former punk rock band
- Cultural cringe, the feeling of inferiority about one's own culture
- The ick, a slang term of the youth used with the definite article
