= Mary Ayubi =

Afghan-American filmmaker and journalist

Mary Ayubi is a filmmaker and journalist from Afghanistan. Due to her experience with the Taliban and war actions in Afghanistan, she uses media and film to document the violent actions of the Taliban and women’s rights in Afghanistan as it would pertain to violence. Mary now lives in Los Angeles and continues her career as a film maker by continuing research and working on a new documentary.

== Career ==
Ayubi was trained to participate in film making by an organization known as AINA in 2002. She participated in a one-year program that led to the development of several films such as Shadows and Afghanistan Unveiled. These two documentaries worked to bring awareness around the world about the violence that occurs to women in Afghanistan. These documentaries changed Mary’s life by making her a pivotal figure in the women’s rights movement in Afghanistan. Considering the graphic content of the documentaries, specifically Shadows, Mary was forced to leave her country and move to Los Angeles due to threats from the Taliban.

"My name is Mary Ayubi. I am from Afghanistan. I worked as a video journalist and a filmmaker for five years in my home country. I worked hard for women rights in my country and wanted to bring about a change in the life of Afghan women. After so many years of war, I am one of thousands of Afghan women who have suffered greatly: I lost two members of my family in the war, I was never able to enjoy my life over there and I do not have good memories from my childhood. I remember only war, destroyed cities, the dead, and hunger. I was always in Afghanistan and was a witness of all the hard times during those years."

- Mary Ayubi, quoted from Shadows: A Screening and Discussion with Mary Amin Ayubi

== Film career ==
=== Afghanistan Unveiled ===
This film was crucial in recognizing the hardships of women in Afghanistan who are affected by the actions of the Taliban. The documentary focuses on the rights of women and freedoms associated with the fall of the Taliban in Kabul. The main objective of the documentary is to recognize the women who have been targets of violence by the Taliban and give them the opportunity to tell their stories and bring awareness to the struggles of the lives of women all over Afghanistan. Women trained by the AINA traveled throughout Afghanistan to listen and tell the stories of the women who have been affected by the Taliban. From stories of slaughter and threats of violence, women tell their stories in order to articulate the existing lack of rights and horrible experiences associated with the Taliban.

=== Shadows ===
Shadows is a second documentary that Mary Ayubi was more heavily involved with which was created as a sequel to the Afghanistan Unveiled documentary. Shadows details more stories about women who are affected by the violence associated with the Taliban in Afghanistan. This documentary details gruesome stories about kidnapping and sexual violence women in Afghanistan are subject to. Through the documentaries, the hope is that change will come to Afghanistan in relation to the rights and treatment of women.

== Filmography ==
Afghanistan Unveiled, 2003 :Video Journalist

Shadows, 2004 :Co-Director

== Accomplishments and awards ==
- Afghanistan Unveiled: nomination at Emmy Awards in 2005
- Afghanistan Unveiled was shown at several film festivals such as the Berlin Film Festival, Femme Totale International Film Festival, the Copenhagen Film Festival etc. which demonstrates the accomplishments of the women involved in the documentaries
- Mary Ayubi is also a grant recipient at Villa Aurora in Los Angeles so that she may continue her research and work on documentaries relating to the violence and lack of women's rights in Afghanistan

== Organization associations ==
=== AINA ===
An organization that Mary Ayubi is involved with that aids women and children through their education and involvement in society. This organization encourages the involvement in society through communication and media outlets. Ayubi was trained through this organization which led to her involvement in the Afghanistan Unveiled documentary. This organization helps bring awareness to the struggles of women and children around the globe and also gives women and children the opportunity to gain education and have involvement in society which they may not be able to do otherwise.

=== RAWA ===
Mary Ayubi is involved with the Revolutionary Association of the Women of Afghanistan, an organization which also helps with the recognition of women’s rights in Afghanistan . The association works to bring awareness and aid to the women in Afghanistan who are not only affected by the Taliban but also those whose rights are violated due to the violence and war surrounding the lives of women. RAWA uses social networking and internet to make the public aware of the implications and violence on women in Afghanistan. RAWA organizes refugee camps, schools, orphanages etc. for people who are affected by violence in Afghanistan in order to work to protect them from the Taliban either through recruitment or violence. Evidenced by the documentary Shooting Women, Mary Ayubi along with several other women are involved with this organization in which they work to bring awareness to the globe about the lack of rights of women in Afghanistan and the continuing violence they are subjected to.
