= The Pirate Signal =

American hip hop group

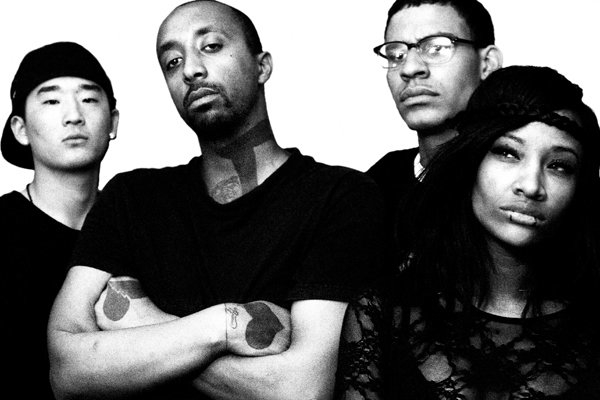

Background information
- Origin: Denver, Colorado, United States
- Genres: Hip hop, rap, alternative rock
- Years active: 2000–present
- Label: Unsigned
- Members: Yonnas Abraham; Chez Strong; Sam "DJ 5am" Trumper; Hogans Daniel
- Website: http://www.thepiratesignal.com

The Pirate Signal is a four-piece hip hop band from Denver, Colorado. The band is composed of MC/Producer Yonnas Abraham, Chez Strong on keyboards and guitar, Sam "Dj 5am" Trumper, and Hogan Daniel on drums.

The Pirate Signal sound has been characterized as a mixture of rap, hip hop and alternative rock. The band was voted Westword Magazine's Best Hip Hop Group in their 2007, 2008, 2009, 2010, and 2011 award showcases.

== History ==
In 2000, Pirate Signal started as an underground mix tape exchange by Ben Serruto. It became a band when Abraham entered the group. Their first album was Norma(l) Hugh Manchild's American Revolution(s) (2004). "What we learned from that album is what not to do."

In 2006, Serruto quit 'Pirate Signal to pursue a solo music career. At the same time, DJ A-What joined the band. The band released an EP The Name of This Band is The Pirate Signal It featured the singles on the college radio circuit, "Go!", "I Can't Wait," "An Emergence of Black Heroes", "You Will Get Dirty", "It Might Just Go Down," and "All I Know is.....It Was an Accident".

In 2006, Pirate Signal received an opening slot on the west coast leg of Kool Keith's 2006 Return of Dr. Octagon Tour. In 2007, the band did two summer tours in the United States.

In 2008, Pirate Signal released a mixtape, Of Gods And Gangsters Vol. 1 that earned mix tape of the year honors in Westword. That year, the band recorded OneAlone. It began as an album actually began before the EP and the mixtape and they were released to garner interest for the full-length", explains Abraham. Joey quit the group and allegedly kept all the recordings.

Without an album, Pirate Signal reconfigured and began work on their project, No Weak Heart Shall Prosper. "OneAlone began to become an albatross the way the first album did, and so much of it was not right for us to perform live that even though it's not what we wanted, the album being abandoned like that was probably best. As we toured more and more, the things that people loved about our live show and our music was not, we realized, on that album. We needed something immediate, powerful and full of energy, and that's what No Weak Heart Shall Prosper is, we're both much happier with this album and how it's coming together. As an album and as a band, this project contains so much more of what we've learned about ourselves in these past three years, that I wouldn't have it any other way, our time is fast approaching, and when it comes, this is what it sounds like. From this we can make the live show that much more incredible, and continue to streamline our sound and accomplish our goal of being the best band in the world."

In 2009, Pirate Signal joined the 2008 Vans Warped Tour as well as an opening slot on 3oh!3's subsequent Myspace 2008 Fall Tour,

In July 2010, DJ A-What left Pirate Signal. DJ Soup and Chez Strong joined the group. The album "No Weak Heart Shall Prosper" was released on August 24, 2010. Following the album release. the band went on a west coast tour of the US.

In February 2011, DJ Soup was replaced with DJ 5am and Hogans Daniel joined the band. That same year, Pirate Signal released music videos for the songs "Saga of Dirty Street kids" and "Love in the Time of Swine Flu".

== Media ==
Pirate Signal has been featured in several promos for the television network HDNet, using the song “I Can’t Wait” 2007, and (You Will) Get Dirty in 2008 and 2009. The Pirate Signal song "Go!" was featured in the FSN sports program Jookt, in October 2009.

== Tour history and awards ==
- 2009 Monolith Festival
- 2008 Sundance Film Festival, Ed Hardy AfterParty
- Opening Slot for 3Oh!3, MySpace Tour, 2008
- 2008 Warped Tour
- 2007 700 World Series Tour with X-Kid, Alpha P, and DJ Inform
- 2006 Summer with Kool Keith, R.A The Ruggid Man, Tash from The Alkaholiks
- Winner of the 13th annual Westword Music Showcase for Best Local Hip Hop Group-2007
- Winner of the 14th annual Westword Music Showcase for Best Local Hip Hop Group-2008
- Winner of the 15th annual Westword Music Showcase for Best Local Hip Hop Group-2009
- Winner of the 16th annual Westword Music Showcase for Best Local Hip Hop Group-2010
- Winner of the 17th annual Westword Music Showcase for Best Local Hip Hop Group-2011

== Discography ==
- No Weak Heart Shall Prosper - 08-24-2010
- Of Gods And Gangsters Vol 1 - 11-26-2008
- The Name of This Band is The Pirate Signal - 06-01-2006
- The Norma(l) LP - 10-16-2004
