= Marc Israel =

American filmmaker and singer

Marc Israel is a filmmaker and musician. He started his career as a traveling "one-man band", but later changed his focus to making documentaries and films about his life.

== Life and work ==
Marc Israel was born and raised in Cinnaminson Township, New Jersey. A graduate of the New School for Social Research, Israel spent the remainder of his twenties hitchhiking the world and performing as a one-man-band. His often-improvised songs were of a humorous and sometimes bawdy nature, based on early American musical forms such as Delta Blues and primitive country music. Beginning in 1994, Israel lived and performed with Allen Ginsberg on and off until the poet's death. His first feature-length film, How I Spent My Summer Vacation (1997), documented one of his cross-country hitchhikes as well as the effects and aftershocks of Ginsberg's passing on his close friends. It featured conversations with futurist Geoff Manaugh, poet Anne Waldman, and a host of strangers in their cars.

In 1999, due to mounting stage fright, Israel ceased performing music, but continued creating films of various lengths, genres, and styles, often focusing on his own emotional troubles, presented with candor and humor. In 2000, he completed the low-budget comic/horror fiction film Frankenstein's Little Monster, a re-visioning of Mary Shelley's novel focusing on the monster's frenzied sexual desires and eventual spiritual awakening. It included Beat Generation poet Peter Orlovsky in the role of Hindu holyman Rick Shaw. The documentary La Hamburguesa Magica (2003) presents a plagued and near-fatal Mexico misadventure undertaken by Israel and then-girlfriend Elyse Allen. By film's end they have separated and Marc is in a mental hospital. Nearer My God to Thee (2005), then follows a heartbroken and fragile Israel to Brazil, where he is seeking the help of famed "miracle man" João de Deus (medium) (John of God). It also explores the previous year's difficulties leading to this journey, including tendinitis, an invasion of ants into his house, an accidental wound to his penis, the aforementioned heartbreak, and a newly failed relationship. A Balancing Act (2007), which won "Best Comedy Documentary" at both the Atlanta International Documentary Film Festival and Montezuma International Film Festival, begins by tracking Israel as he presents Nearer My God to Thee at festivals, but departs from his trademark self-surveillance style as he learns about a mysterious event in Vietnam where contestants balance various objects on motorbikes. His curiosity leads him first to the Museum of Ephemerata in Texas where the curators restore him to health with their life-affirming attitudes and endless supply of Kombucha tea, then to Iowa City where he develops a strong kinship with an eccentric university scholar who lectures on the balancing contest, and eventually to Southeast Asia, hitchhiking through Thailand, Cambodia, and finally Vietnam, where the contest takes place.

After A Balancing Act, Marc Israel has created a series of short films including Encounters With Sarah(commissioned by Found Magazine founder Davy Rothbart), a music video about his cat Barkley, a documentary about folk music legend Michael Hurley, and "an epic sea odyssey" filmed entirely in his bathtub using rubber duckies.

While Israel's personal documentaries have been lauded for their emotional honesty, some viewers have questioned the legitimacy of Israel's claims to mental illness. "Supposedly suffering from an undiagnosable condition....the more he dwells on himself, the more convinced he is (and the less convinced the viewer is) of his mysterious handicaps", writes one film critic. Alternately, there has been some speculation about whether the Museum of Ephemerata's "unique" Kombucha brew really had the positive mental health effects Israel claimed. "I no longer wanted to kill myself or anyone else. It caused a 'rebirth of wonder' within my whole molecular structure", says Israel in A Balancing Act. Mr. Israel started his own Kombucha brand, Phenomenal World Kombucha (named after his production company Phenomenal World Cinema), but halted operations due to an overwhelming increase of supply and demand inspired by word-of-mouth, association with his films, and endorsements by Michael Hurley.
