= Geir Ove Kvalheim =

Norwegian film director

Geir Ove Kvalheim (born 30 April 1970 in Bergen, Norway) is a Norwegian producer, film director, actor and writer. He is a former politician in the Norwegian Labour Party's youth movement.

== Legal dispute with SS veterans ==
In 2000 Kvalheim began work on a film about Norwegian veterans of the SS. He later claimed to have revealed a Nazi network in the process, and to have received death threats from this network.
