= Norm Green =

American director and executive producer (born 1966)

- Born: Norman Green; United States
- Occupations: Journalist, Director, Producer, Writer, Cinematographer
- Years active: 1996 – present
- Spouse: Lauren Lazin
- Awards: Overseas Press Club Citation; NAACP Image Award; Amnesty International's Movies That Matter Award

Norm Green (born as Norman Green) is an American director and executive producer.

== Career ==
Green directed the MTV documentary television series I'm From Rolling Stone, which ran from January–March 2007. In 2008, Green directed docu-reality series episodes of A&E Network's paranormal investigative series Paranormal State and the WE tv's The Locator.

Green directed the pilot of Tabloid Wars, a documentary series set in the newsroom of the New York Daily News, for Bravo, which debuted on July 24, 2006. In 2006, he produced another hour for Logo network's Real Momentum, this time on the lives of gay Republicans. The episode, called "Elephant in the Room", aired on June 24, 2006.

In 2006, he traveled to Cambodia to executive produce and film New Year Baby, the story of a family's flight from the Khmer Rouge. New Year Baby won Amnesty International's Movies That Matter Award at the International Documentary Film Festival Amsterdam. It currently tours film festivals around the world and airs on Independent Lens.

In 2005, Green produced an hour-long documentary episode on the lives of gay Latinos called "Latino Beginnings" for Logo network's Real Momentum. The episode aired on National Coming Out Day.

In 2004, he executive produced two hour-long episodes of cultural commentary for VH1's The Greatest, "25 Greatest Rock Star Cameos" and "25 Greatest Commercials."

From 2000-2003, Green created profiles of young people overcoming adversity for the Children's Defense Fund.

Green produced Criminal: Punks vs. Preps, a documentary about the slaughter of Brian Deneke, which was released on October 3, 2000. Criminal: Punks vs. Preps is now in development as a feature film. In 2002, he produced another True Life episode called "I Have Embarrassing Parents."

In February 2000, Green won the NAACP Image Award for an episode of MTV's verité documentary television series True Life about racial profiling, called I'm Driving While Black.

In 1996, Green produced a number of investigations for Inside Edition. Topics included prisons, gangs, and drugs in Mexico, exploited garment workers in the Mariana Islands, and racism on television. He received an Overseas Press Club Citation for the program on workers in the Marianas.

Green traveled into the Bosnian war and post-war zone five times, where he drove a humanitarian aid truck and helped the new government to democratize their broadcast media. He contributed to The New York Times' web site "Bosnia: Uncertain Paths to Peace", the first web site nominated for the Pulitzer Prize.

Green teaches at New York University School of Continuing and Professional Studies.

Through his company Olive Eye Films, he currently has one feature film, two documentaries, and four television series in development and two pilots casting. Of these are Devil Dolls, a documentary about the all-female motorcycle club of the same name, and Hotel Cassadaga, a docu series that takes place in Cassadaga, Florida.
