= Nicola Black =

British producer and director

- Born: Nicola Jane Black; Glasgow, Scotland
- Occupations: TV director Film director Television director Film producer
- Years active: 1990–present
- Website: http://www.blackwatchmedia.co.uk/

Nicola Jane Black (born in Glasgow) is a Scottish film and television producer and director. Her work includes the documentaries Designer Vaginas, Bone Breakers, When Freddie Mercury Met Kenny Everett, Tribal Cop, White Jazz, Jenny Saville – Flesh & Blood and the series Mirrorball and Banned in the UK which featured in the Channel 4 Banned season.

Black is also the producer of Channel 4's Mesh animation scheme, producing digital animations including Covert, Daddy, Killing Time at Home and Watermelon Love.

== Biography ==
Born in Glasgow, Black began her career as a trainee editor working on Derek Jarman's film Caravaggio, before moving on to television with Halfway to Paradise.

In 1995 she established her production company, Blackwatch Media. The company's first production was the documentary White Jazz about crime writer James Ellroy's search for his mother's murderer. She went on to produce and direct the Channel 4 series Post Mortem, broadcast in 1997, about genius and illness, examining the lives and works of Beethoven, Virginia Woolf, Nijinsky, Montgomery Clift and Francis Bacon.

In the late 1990s, she produced and directed the pop-promo series Mirrorball, featuring profiles on Spike Jonze, Mike Mills, Roman Coppola, Michel Gondry and Dawn Shadforth.

Black directed and produced several documentaries for Channel 4, including Designer Vaginas (2002), Bone Breakers (2002), When Freddie Met Kenny (2002), Snorting Coke with the BBC (2003), Banned in the UK and Banned Films, the latter presented by Tim Roth (2005), both were shown as part of the Channel 4 Banned season – which Black co-devised.

Since 2001 Black ran and produced the Channel 4 digital animation scheme Mesh, producing four digital animations a year.

In 2007 Black produced Potapych: The Bear Who Loved Vodka, which won a BAFTA Scotland Award for Best Animated Film.

In 2012 Black produced UNESCO award-winning photographer David Gillander's film The Neglected for the Channel 4 series The Shooting Gallery.
