= Ted Sharks =

American film producer

- Born: Ibaraki, Japan
- Occupations: Film director, producer, screenwriter
- Years active: present
- Notable work: Hard to Say; Save the Underprivileged; An Ideal Marriage
- Website: http://www.tedsharks.com

Ted Sharks (born January 25) is a Japanese film director, producer, screenwriter and editor. He is best known for writing and directing Hard to Say, Save the Underprivileged and An Ideal Marriage.

== Personal life ==
Sharks was born in Ibaraki, Japan. He went to Waseda University, Tokyo. He later attended Digital Hollywood School to learn CG Animation. His short CG animation film When a spoon met a knife won the award of Tsukuba Gakuin University Awards (Tsukuba Short Movie Competition).

Then he moved to New York and attended New York Film Academy. While at the school, his quarter film Hard to Say won the award of "Best Music Video" in Metropolitan Film Festival of New York City.

== Career ==
=== Director and writer ===
His CG animation film When a spoon met a knife, a love story between a spoon and a knife, won the award of Tsukuba Gakuin University Awards.

After he decided to make a film, not CG animation, his quarter film Hard to Say at New York Film Academy won the Best Music Video Award in Metropolitan Film Festival of New York City. It was selected as an official screening for NYC Independent Film Festival. His late start to be a film director and an achievement appeared in Japanese newspaper Shukan NY Seikatsu."

== Awards and recognition ==
=== An Ideal Marriage ( Short Film; Director, Writer and Editor ) – 2016 ===
WINNER “BEST SHORT FILM (Grand Prix)” (NYC Indie Film Awards)

WINNER “BEST DIRECTOR (2nd Place )” (NYC Indie Film Awards)

Official Selection (UAS International Action Film Festival)

Official Selection (New York Short Film Festival)

Official Selection (NYC Indie Film Awards)

=== Red Rose Chronicle ( Short Film; Director, Writer and Editor ) - 2016 ===
WINNER AWARD OF RECOGNITION (Best Shorts Competition)

WINNER AWARD OF RECOGNITION (Accolade Global Film Competition)

=== Tiny Snow ( Music Video; 2nd Videographer ) - 2016 ===
WINNER BEST MUSIC VIDEOS (New York Jazz Film Festival)

WINNER GOLDEN AGE IN JAZZ AWARD (New York Jazz Film Festival)

=== Hard to Say ( Music Video; Director, Cinematographer, Writer and Editor ) – 2015 ===
WINNER BEST MUSIC VIDEO (Metropolitan Film Festival of New York City)

Official Selection (International Film Festival Manhattan NYC)

Official Selection (NYC Independent Film Festival)

Official selection (CINEPLAY film awards)

=== When a spoon met a knife - 2015 ===
WINNER Tsukuba Gakuin University Awards (Tsukuba Short Movie Competition)

== Filmography ==
Year	Title	Director	Producer	Writer
2014	When a spoon met a knife	Yes	Yes	Yes
2015	Hard to Say	Yes	Yes	Yes
2016	Save the Underprivileged	Yes	No	Yes
2016	An Ideal Marriage	Yes	Yes	Yes
