= Dionciel Armstrong =

American writer, director and producer (born 1973)

- Born: December 29, 1973 (age 51); Detroit, Michigan, U.S.
- Occupations: Director; writer; producer
- Website: Website

Dionciel (Donny) Armstrong (born December 29, 1973) is an American writer, director, and producer in the film industry. He is currently the president and CEO of Mind Vision Productions. The youngest of five siblings, Armstrong was born and raised in Detroit, Michigan.

== Career ==
In 1997, Dionciel Armstrong founded Rapfiles.com, which is an online recourse and information portal for independent artist, producers, and labels. Prior to launching Rapfiles.com, he owned a full service printing company. Shortly after selling his printing business, Dionciel Armstrong began focusing on his film career by making his debut with a documentary titled "Street Life", which was released on DVD in 2001. Produced, written and directed by Armstrong, the documentary sold over 40,000 units nationwide through their independent distribution company. One year later, "Street Life" was released to a larger distribution company called Xenon Pictures and has sold over a quarter million copies nationwide.

In 2003, Armstrong released "Rap Files: Vol. 1" to DVD. This provided him with the opportunity to expose the industry to up-and-comings and Hip-Hop fans as well. "Rap Files Vol. 1" is now sold in over 10 countries and is currently an online show which features interviews from today’s entertainers such as Katt Williams, Method Man, Eminem, and Proof.

Dionciel Armstrong is a consultant to independent based record labels. He has worked with WonderBoy Entertainment as the GM of Operations and Marketing VP. WonderBoy quickly became a successful independent record label that reached a deal with Koch Records and later signed a deal with Motown/Universal Music Group. A couple years later after joining another independent record company based in Michigan, Dionciel Armstrong signed a GM deal at Royalty Records Inc. which operates with the likes of Forty Da Great, Lyric, Show, and its own recording studio.

In 2008 "Five K One", a feature film drama that was produced, written and directed by Armstrong. The film stars Clifton Powell, Anthony Johnson, Melvin Jackson Jr., and Yukmouth. This film focuses on the story of two best friends who has had their run of the streets. Throughout this film they will go through trials and tribulations, and face adversity and life altering decisions that they may not be able to live with. Dionciel Armstrong wrote this film to bring awareness to what the street have to offer which is prison, death and chaos. He took the title straight from the federal sentencing guidelines in section 5.k.1.2 which states that if an individual gives information to convict someone else, their sentence will be expunged or reduced for cooperating.

=== Filmography ===
- Street Life (2001) – Producer, Writer, Director
- Rap Files Vol. 1 (2003) – Producer, Writer, Cinematographer
- Five K One (2008) – Producer, Writer, Director
- Rap Files DVD Magazine Vol. 2
- Rap Files DVD Magazine Vol. 3
- Uncut Series DVD Series
- Street Life Directors Cut
- VH1's – Celebrity Disguise
- Wanna Be A Rapper
- Family Secrets
- Beef Carver
