= Wilco Melissant =

Dutch director (born 1968)

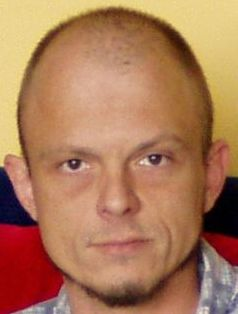
- Born: 8 December 1968 (age 57)
- Occupation: director

Wilco Melissant (born 8 December 1968) is a Dutch director who directed various arthouse video productions for Witchhunt Productions, of which he himself is the chairman. His productions were shown on the Dutch TV station RotterdamTV.

His work was shown at the 2005 International Multimedial Art Festival (IMAF) in Odžaci, Serbia and the 2006 R EJECT Film Festival in Rotterdam, The Netherlands.
