= Anthony Himbs =

American writer and movie director (born 1960)

- Born: July 28, 1960 (age 65); Dallas, Texas
- Occupation(s): Writer; Director

Anthony Himbs (born July 28, 1960) is an American writer and movie director.

== Career ==
Himbs was born in Dallas, Texas in 1960 to an Italian-American father and a Canadian mother.

He was raised in Texas, France, England, Canada, Italy, and Spain, and began his career as an assistant director for Léonard Keigel and Lewis Furey.

As a director, he started off with a couple of episodes of Dalziel and Pascoe and Timothy Tweedle the First Christmas Elf with Jonathan Taylor Thomas.

In 2006, he made La paz de tus ojos tristes, an ill-fated independent film (starring André Schneider and Coral Ortega) which was both a critical and commercial failure, followed by the rather obscure horror parody Dairy of Terror (with Paul Naschy) in 2007.

Other film credits include Colgado de la luna (writer, executive producer), Un hombre de porvenir (co-writer, producer), and Black Terrorist (writer).

== Personal life ==
From 1984 to 2000, Himbs was married to litigation attorney Martha Swatek; they had a son, Marco, born in 1985.

In 2007, Italian actress Federica Trucchia became his third wife; their son, Enrique, was born two years before.

After divorcing Trucchia in 2008, Himbs married Joana Oliveira, a young Portuguese television actress.

As of 2002, he has permanently relocated in Madrid, Spain.

== Filmography ==
=== as director ===
- La paz de tus ojos tristes (2006)

=== as producer ===
- La paz de tus ojos tristes (2006)
- Colgado de la luna (2005)
- No Future (2010)
- Un hombre de provenir (2010)

=== as writer ===
- La paz de tus ojos tristes (2006)
- Black Terrorist (1985)
- Colgado de la luna (2005)

=== as editor ===
- La paz de tus ojos tristes (2006)

=== as actor ===
- Colgado de la luna (2005)

=== as executive producer ===
- Colgado de la luna (2005)
