= Daniel Roemer =

American film director

- Born: Daniel Roemer; May 14, 1980 (age 45); Mansfield, Ohio, U.S.
- Years active: 1999—present
- Website: http://danielroemerfilm.com/

Daniel Roemer is a Los Angeles–based American film director, actor, producer and screenwriter. He studied undeclared at University of Southern California and graduated with a Film & Television degree at Academy of Art University. He received a master's degree in Directing from MetFilm School - London.

== Active projects ==
Daniel is currently in development on the feature film, "GOAT - the Greatest of All Time", a large-budget action sports comedy.

Additionally, his 8-episode sci-fi TV series, “Chaser”, distributed by Buffalo 8, is streaming on Amazon Prime and Tubi.

== Recognition ==
- Two season Project Greenlight Best Director Finalist (Producers Ben Affleck/Matt Damon)
- Student Academy Award Finalist
- USA Film's top 10 Emerging Director's List
- On The Lot Best Director Finalist (producer Steven Spielberg)
- LA Film Fest "DNA Award" (Universal Films Million Dollar Feature Deal) finalist.
- Hannah Rosin article (Atlantic Monthly).

== Screenings ==
- Sundance Film Festival
- Damah Film Festival
- AFI Fest
- LA Shorts Fest
- Special United States Senate screening in Washington, D.C.
- Theatrical distribution (75 countries).
- National screenings with 20th Century Fox producer, Ralph Winter (X-Men 1 & 2, and X-Men: The Last Stand).

== Filmography ==
=== Director ===
- CHASER (2024) Buffalo 8, Amazon Prime, Tubi - TV Series
- Red White and Blowhard (DFC Films – 2015) feature documentary
- (CW Network) (2014) – TV Pilot
- (Sportsman Channel) (2011) national commercials
- GRAY (2010) feature docu-drama (Delaware Film Company)
- Loneliness of One National TV (2009) "World's Funniest Moments – Arsenio Hall
- I Love Your Work (2005) (Sony Pictures) Behind the Scenes: Giovanni Ribisi, Jason Lee, Vince Vaughn, Christina Ricci, Elvis Costello
- Huckleberry Fund (2005), Ben Stiller interview
- The Select Fit (2004)
- Charity promos (2004) John Travolta, Kelly Preston, Meryl Streep, Olivia Newton-John, John Ritter, Pierce Brosnan, Selma Blair
- Cigarette (2003)
- Access Hollywood (2003) director/editor
- E! (2002) director
- American Wet Dream (2001)

=== Editor ===
- Entertainment Tonight (Active)
- Access Hollywood (Active)
- The View (2007)
- Dumpster Diving (2006) A&E TV Series
- Nameless Moment (2006)
- "Beyond the Felt" (2005) doc TV Series (UK)
- The Select Fit (2004)
- Cigarette (2003)
- E! (2002)

=== Writer ===
- Treatment (2010) (story by) 20th Century Fox
- 10,000 Virgins (2008) co-writer Ron Fernandez, producer Craig Detweiler.
- The Select Fit (2004)
- Cigarette (2003)
- American Wet Dream (2001)
- When Goldfish Weep (2002)

=== Actor ===
- The Select Fit (2004) .... Tomboy
