= Yugander V. V. =

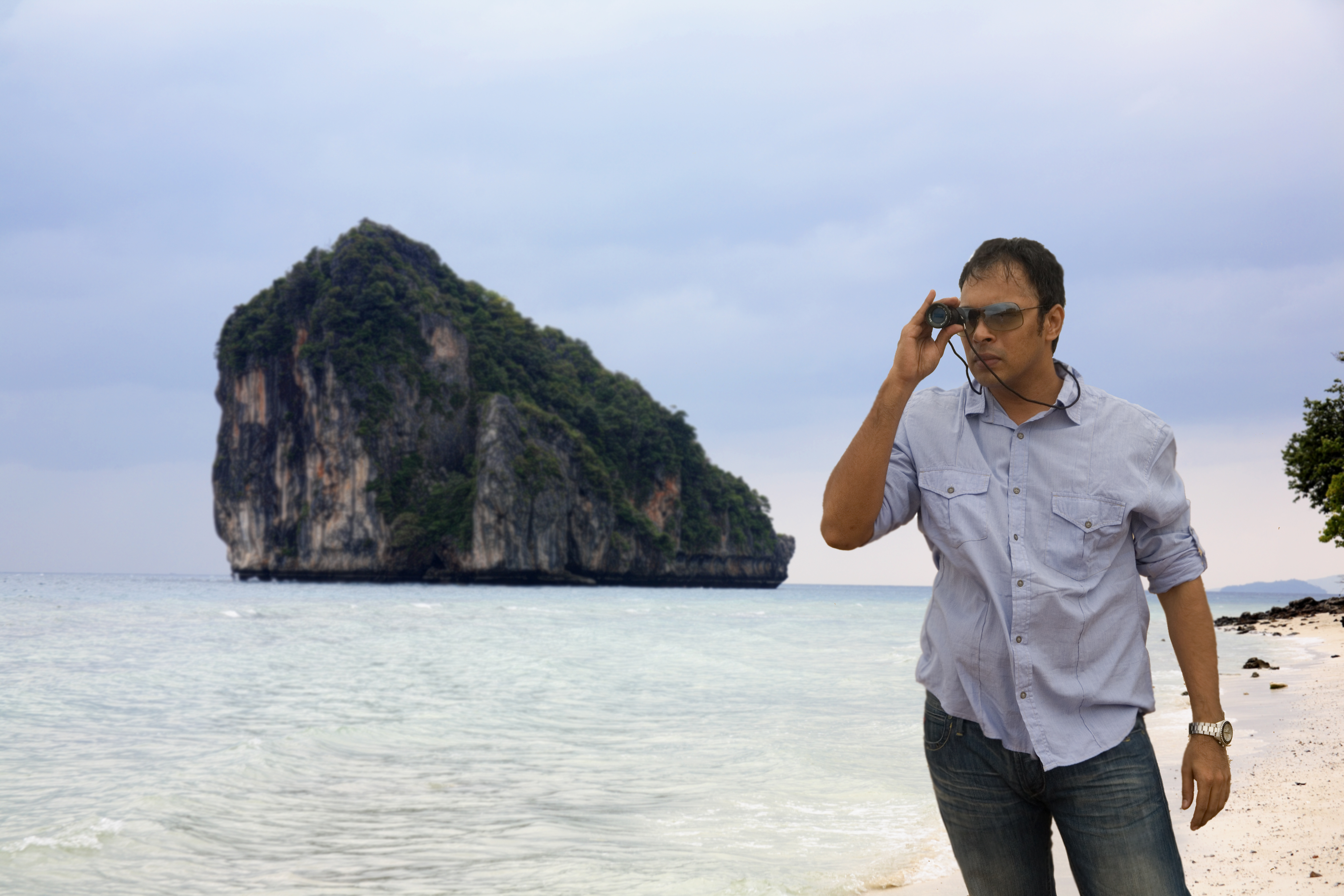
Yugander V V

Yugander V V (born 20 January 1974) also known as Yugander Vungaralla, is an Indian Filmmaker, Screenwriter, Producer and Television Channel Head, based in Mumbai.

Yugander was born in the city of Secunderabad in Telangana, India.

His debut film 'The Goodbye Trip' was an ambitious effort in Independent Film-making with a cast of mostly new faces but for a few notable exceptions. He is a Telecommunications Engineer but turned to film-making via associating with prominent filmmakers Ketan Mehta, Shyam Benegal and Mahesh Mathai. He went on to head B4U Television Network as the Creative Head. At 29 he was one of the youngest Creative Heads across networks. He has also directed music videos for Zambezi Funk and Blaaze that have gone on to garner cult status. Zambezi Funk's 'In my father's words' video directed by Yugander was the first Indian Video to air on VH1.

== Filmography ==
- The Goodbye Trip (2013)

== Awards ==
- Promax BDA Asia Pacific - Gold
- Promax BDA Asia Pacific - Silver
