= Darren Benjamin Shepherd =

American screenwriter and film director

Darren Benjamin Shepherd is an American screenwriter, film director and editor. He was born in San Jose, CA and graduated with film and music degrees from San Jose State University.

He wrote the film The First Ride of Wyatt Earp released as Wyatt Earp's Revenge starring Val Kilmer in the lead role as Wyatt Earp. Jeffrey Schenck produced and Peter Sullivan co-produced. He also co-directed New Hope Landing, a short film in the horror genre.

Shepherd is a freelance screenwriter for various independent film production companies in Beverly Hills, CA. In addition to Wyatt Earp's Revenge, he wrote Meteor Impact, Broken Engagement, Discipline and others, all films in various stages of development. He is also a freelance editor and is currently filming a documentary film about the musical groups of Northern California.

He began as an Assistant Director, Casting Associate and Production Assistant for such films as Casino, Con Air, Mars Attacks!, Breakdown, Ed TV, The Grinch, High Crimes, The Cat in the Hat, The X-Files, Deadwood, and Monk as well as others.

His background includes a short career as a professional musician in Las Vegas, NV.
