= Erin Wiedner =

American film director

- Born: Erin Wiedner; Mill Valley, California, U.S.
- Occupations: Film director, cinematographer, camera operator, still photographer
- Years active: Unknown–present
- Notable work: Angel Face
- Website: www.erinwiedner.com

Erin Wiedner (born in Mill Valley, California) is an American independent filmmaker, director and cinematographer.

== Early life ==
Little is publicly known about Erin's early life. What is known is that Erin was born in Mill Valley, California.

== Music videos ==
Erin has been the Director and Cinematographer for various music videos. The videos have been seen by a wide audience. Once such music video for the single, "How Can I Let You Go," performed by Filipino actress, and musical artist, Patricia Javier from her album "Songs From My Heart" was shown on MTV Philippines.

== Commercials ==
Erin has been the Director and Cinematographer for a multitude of commercials, which have been shown on MTV, VH1 and Comedy Central, for various companies in different industries ranging from regional restaurants to night-life and entertainment companies.

== Notable works ==
=== Directing ===
==== Music videos ====
Year	Title	Artist	Director	Cinematographer	Notes
Unknown	"Say A Little Prayer"	Ava Johnson	Yes	Yes	
Unknown	"Live And Learn"	Ava Johnson	Yes	Yes	

=== Cinematography ===
==== Films ====
Year	Title	Director	Cinematographer	Notes
2010	Stress Relief	No	Yes	Directed by Galen Thorne
2008	Angel Face	No	Yes	Directed by Cecile Cinco
2007	Campaign America	No	Yes	Directed by Andrew Shepherd

==== Music videos ====
Year	Title	Artist	Director	Cinematographer	Notes
2007	"How Can I Let You Go"	Patricia Javier	No	Yes	

== Frequent collaborators ==
=== Directors/Producers ===
- Cecile Cinco

=== Actors/Actresses ===
Erin has worked with Joseph Will, who has had roles on Star Trek: Voyager and Star Trek: Enterprise, as well as starred with David Hyde Pierce in The Perfect Host, on multiple projects.

Erin has worked with Filipino film star and musical artist Patricia Javier, who has over starred in over 20 films and has released multiple musical albums, in multiple projects, ranging from music videos to films.

=== Musicians ===
- Patricia Javier
- Ava Johnson

== Personal life ==
Erin currently resides in San Diego, California
