= Chris Fesko =

Chris Fesko is a director and film producer of educational videos for children about her dairy farm in upstate New York. She is also a national agricultural keynote speaker and workshop leader. Over the past 23 years, Fesko has produced eleven videos. She has won the Telly Award and Parents' Choice Award for her work. Fesko is the owner of On the Farm Discovery Center, an educational field trip experience for elementary children to learn math, science, and language arts in a restored barn.
