= Benjamin T. Orifici =

American film director

- Occupations: Film director, screenwriter, cinematographer, editor

Benjamin T. Orifici is an American film director, screenwriter, cinematographer, and editor. He is the co-founder of the film production company, Celluloid Rain Productions based in Brooklyn and Paris. His feature films include Carroll Park (2013) and Brooklyn Breach (2012).
