= Chris Twomey =

American film director

Chris Twomey 2010 ASTRAL FLUFF:Carnal Bodies in Celestial Orbit installation

Chris Twomey (born 1954) is an American female multi-media artist and filmmaker. Her work focuses on her life and experience as a springboard for meditations on the human condition where origins and identity in relationship to the individual in society are explored through scientific, psychological, and conceptual art themes.

Chris Twomey works in series using a variety of mediums – film, photography, painting, sculpture, digital media, sound, and installation - which can incorporate one or all these elements.

== Biography ==
Twomey's family moved around the country frequently: Chicago, IL, Nyack, NJ, Teaneck, NJ, Greenville, SC, Hixon TN, Rochester NY, before settling in Wyckoff NJ. Twomey attended Reed College in Portland OR, and eventually graduated with honors from Ramapo College in NJ with a BA degree in sculpture in 1976. She attended Pratt Institute and obtained an MFA degree in 1979.

In 1976, after receiving her bachelor's degree, Twomey originated an art performance group called “Performance People,” inspired by other multi-media, conceptual artists like Meredith Monk, Vito Acconci, and Laurie Anderson. Twomey used film-making techniques to document the performances, becoming a filmmaker in the process. Later, immersion in art films contributed to a sensibility where subject matter, sound, time-based mediums and montage-like visuals were consistently utilized. This resulted in the creation of many short super-8 films in which Twomey used herself, as well as singing and composing many of the soundtracks. In a review of Twomey's retrospective exhibition at the Ramapo College Art Galleries, Daniel Rothbart wrote:

"Get Ahead, a film from this series, plays on themes of transformation, gender-bending identity, sexual aggression, patriotism and other themes. Twomey is the subject throughout, her head framed tightly by the camera, smiling, singing sweetly and combing her hair (while "Get Ahead" is chanted in a layered audio track composed and sung by Twomey)."

Residencies at the Experimental TV Center and a grant from the Media Bureau at the Kitchen Center for Video and Film fueled Twomey's interest in filmmaking possibilities.

"In the 1970s, Twomey was deeply involved with filmmaking, creating works that reflect the experimental ethos of period. Works like Get Ahead, What’s the Point, Feed Us and Fun and Games suggest a dialogue with figures like John Cage, Robert Wilson, Dick Higgens, Jonas Mekas, Stan Brakhage and Maya Deren. These short films adopt surrealist juxtaposition, overlays, and animation techniques to reflect some of the contradictions of female experience." —Eleanor Heartney

Graduating from Pratt Institute in 1979 with an MFA, majoring in New Forms, as well as winning a 1978 Ford Foundation Grant for her multi-layered portapak video entitled Unmoved, Twomey later concentrated on exploring narrative filmmaking. She completed shorts “Phenelzine Sulfate” with support from the Hy Goldman Fund 1979, and One Way, which won a 1980 Creative Artists Public Service Grant sponsored by the New York State Council on the Arts and was exhibited at Museum of Modern Art.

=== Film and television career ===
After receiving an MFA, Twomey went to work full-time in film and television from 1984 to 1991. Twomey won a National Academy of Television Arts and Sciences award as editor of "Channel 2 The people" and shared many other film industry awards while editing for CBS News "48 Hours." One of the few documentary videotape editors at "48 Hours" in NYC to become a producer, Twomey became a music producer for reporter Mark McEwen at CBS This Morning. During these years she also completed 4 full-length feature film screenplays – “Last Monarch” 1991, “Love Vindiloo” 1987, “Red Bayou” 1986, “The Comets Eye” 1983. In 1991 she won an American Film Institute Directing Internship and interned under director, Martha Coolidge, on “Lost in Yonkers” written by Neil Simon.

== Photography and installation ==
After having her first child in 1991 (Twomey had the last of her three children in 1998)" Twomey left the film business to resume a career as an artist with a full time studio practice, using baby images as provocative subject matter to challenge sentimental cliches. "Chris Twomey who often works with photography and computers, had submitted a large oil gridded into dozen rows of 16 squares, each filled with a tiny oil painting of a baby."Baby Quilt" looks like a freehand contact sheet - an odd reversal for conventional influence pathways."

In 2004,“Omni Series, Art and Genetics in a Digital Age,” a first solo show using the political/sociological subject of stem cell research, was exhibited at Tribes gallery in NYC. CNN’s Jeanne Moos created a story segment of the show that aired on Anderson Cooper 360.

In 2006, Tribes Gallery exhibited Madonna Series, another multi-media installation, receiving reviews in Art in America, “ASCI,” “The Scientist” and NYArts Magazine. Madonna Series was informed by classical Renaissance paintings, but used DNA as spiritual cosmology with working American Mothers and their children as subject matter. Subsequent solo exhibitions include ASTRAL FLUFF: Carnal Bodies in Celestial Orbit at CREON Gallery NYC 2010, Westbeth Gallery NYC 2010, and HP Garcia Gallery NYC 2011.

In 2007, Chris Twomey and Peggy Cyphers founded Broadthinking, a curatorial project exhibiting innovative art which visually promoted progressive concepts exploring ideas for continued existence in the face of war, ecological destruction and inequity. "at Broadway Gallery in Soho is a compilation of installations of eleven individual artists metamorphing natural or waste products into creating (infusing) another form of existence or new life in the materials."

"Spearheading the 21st century's love affair with media, along with, and ahead of, the many artist who have recently discovered the potency of performance, film, sound, and manipulated photography, Twomey has a particularly innovative penchant for melding the celestial with the carnal, the ethereal with the scientific, the sublime with the cerebral."”

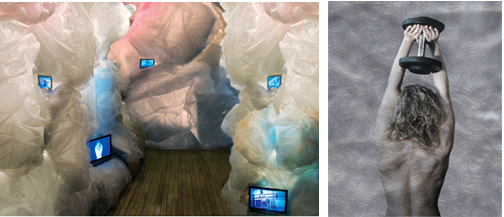
Astral Fluff:Carnal Bodies in Celestial Orbit (installation detail CREON Gallery 2010

In an interview about “Astal Fluff: Carnal Bodies in Celestial Orbit,” 2010 Twomey describes her process: “...(in the installation) I have two elements here, these fluffy celestial shapes that are in the (installation), as well as the very corporal, earthly and grounded endurance oriented actions of being human and all the things we do every day (in the DVDS). In the photographs, I unite these two elements because when we do these actions, we have hope or trust that these earthly actions will result in something that will be better. ”.

== Filmography ==
- 1976: Roll 1 and Roll 2 - super 8 film (1 minute each)
- 1976: What's the Point? - super 8 film (6:00 minutes)
- 1976: Tubes - super 8 film (3:05 minutes)
- 1976: Get Ahead - super 8 film (7 minutes)
- 1978: Fun and Games - super 8 film (1:09 minutes)
- 1979: Feed Us - super 8 film (2:20 minutes)
- 1978: Unmoved - Portapak reel to reel (7:00 minutes)
- 1979: Phenelzine Sulfate - 16mm short narrative drama (8:00 minutes)
- 1985: One way If You Let Me - 16mm short narrative drama (14:00 minutes)

SELECT DVD’S created for installations or as art loops.

- 2004 - Omni Series (loop)
- 2006 - Madonna Series (loop)
- 2008 - Madonna Series (loop) photographs Lisa and Iain: Profession- Musician
- 2008 - Triumph of the XX (loop)
- 2009 - Tsunami 3000 AD (loop)
- 2009 - Waves Away loop
- 2009 - Interview - video opening for UNNATURAL ACTS and Other Illicit Thoughts About Nature
- 2010 - Interview - with Chris Twomey about ASTRAL FLUFF: Carnal Bodies in Celestial Orbit
- 2011 – Fracked Venus – loop
- 2011 – Lay Me Down – performance collaboration with Daniel Rothbart
- 2011 – 1% Solution – filmed performance piece

== Monograph ==
“CHRIS TWOMEY PARALLAX: Time, Media, and Significance,” 2011 with critical essays by Eleanor Heartney, text by David Freund, Steve Cannon, Norm Hinsey and Chris Twomey, is a full color, 141 pages, 8.5 x 11 perfect bound book, detailing a personal memoir running parallel to the survey of Twomey's career over the last 30 years with approximately 130 pages of art images.

This monograph was published after a diagnosis of metastatic stage IV breast cancer in 2009. Her first diagnosis was for stage IIA breast cancer in 2002.
