= Constance Tillotson =

American film director

Constance Tillotson is a writer, producer, personal manager. Her clients work in top TV & film productions. In 2009, Tillotson was selected by the U.S. Embassy to bring her "On-the-Set" Film camp global, working in the Maldives with recovering heroin addicts and in Sri Lanka with the children coming from the country's 26-year civil war.

The BBC has reported that there are 30,000 children in the Maldives addicted to hard drugs. Heroin is the most frequently used drugs in the Maldives. For the Maldives film camp, the Raajje Foundation came on board as a partner. The Raajje Foundation is a non-profit agency supporting regional civil society initiatives. UNICEF and Maldives TV filmed the process of the camp.

In 2010, Tillotson was named the "cultural envoy" to Sri Lanka and will travel to Sri Lanka a month each the summer welcoming the next generation film makers.

Ms. Tillotson currently resides in Los Angeles California.
