= Caryl Deyn Korma =

American film director

- Occupation: Film director

Caryl Deyn Korma is a Film Director, Senior Colorist and Senior Editor. With more than 20 years of experience, Caryl has the ability to specialize in more than one area of the Film and Television Industry.

His projects as Director and Director of photography include several Fox International Channels TV commercials, and several TV show openings like Prime time Series "Mentes en Shock" for Fox International Channels and MundoFox, and "Las Fieras del Futbol" for Natgeo (2014). In 2017 Caryl was the Lead Visual FX Artist for the Netflix special by Barbra Streisand Barbra: The Music, The Mem'ries, The Magic (2017) . His projects as Colorist and Senior Editor include "State of Play" for HBO (2016), American Feature film "Towards Darkness" (2007), "Eric Clapton's Crossroads Guitar Festival 2013" and Fox Prime Time American Mental (TV series)(2009).

== Career ==
His projects also include his work as Editor for feature film "At The End of the Spectra" and Prime Time TV Series "Kdabra" for which he also Directed the Antarctic sequence for the first episode of the second season. Worked in India Catalina Award-winning TV series El Capo (2009)" and Prime Time TV Series Tiempo Final, Official selection Semaine de la Critique Cannes Film Festival’s Feature Film "1989" (2009), and Cannes Short Film Festival participating project "La Muerte del Gato" (2014). Internationally multi awarded short film "Colmillo", and Editor, VFX Supervisor and Colorist for the Golden Fiap Award winner and short list qualification Cannes Lions TV commercial "Lojack, atrapado" .

== Filmography ==
- Mick Fleetwood & Friends Celebrate the Music of Peter Green (colorist) / (on-line editor) - (2021)
- Eric Clapton's Crossroads Guitar Festival 2019 - (Video) (colorist) / (on-line editor) - (2020)
- Joni 75: A Birthday Celebration - (colorist) / (on-line editor) (2019)
- American Horror Story (TV Series) (on-line editor - 1 episode) (2019)
- Hollywood Game Night (TV Series) (on-line editor - 13 episodes) (2019-2020)
- Girl Meets Farm (TV Series documentary) (on-line editor - 33 episodes, 2018 - 2019)
- Barbra: The Music... The Mem'ries... The Magic! - (lead Visual FX artist) (2017)
- State of Play - HBO - (Colorist - on-line editor) (2016)
- La Casa Vacía - Short Film - (Editor - Colorist) (2015)
- The Lovaganza Convoy - feature film screen tests- (VFX supervisor and Colorist) (2014)
- TV show opening - Las Fieras del Futbol- National Geographic Channel (Director, Editor, Colorist and Visual effects artist) (2014)
- Killer Kids (2014)
- Deadbeat (TV series) (visual effects artist - 2 episodes) (pre-production) (2014)
- Short Film - La Muerte del Gato - (Editor, Colorist, Sound designer and sound editor) (2014)
- The Aquabats! Super Show! (TV Series) (visual effects artist - 8 episodes) (2013-2014)
- Eric Clapton's Crossroads Guitar Festival (colorist)(2013)
- South Beach Tow (TV Series)(colorist - 1 episode) (2013)
- Feature Film - Den of Darkness - (Colorist, Sound designer, Sound mixer) (2012-2013)
- Short Film -Eat- (Dalunda Productions) (Editor, Colorist, Sound designer, Sound mixer) (2013)
- Lynch (TV series) for Movie city and Mundo Fox (Colorist and Online editor) (2011-2012)
- Mentes en Shock (TV Series) Fox (Director and Director of photography for opening and TV spots) (2011)
- TV show opening - Cocineros al Limite Season 1 - (Director, Editor, Colorist and visual effects supervisor) (2011)
- TV show opening - Cocineros al Limite Season 2 - (Director, Editor, Colorist and visual effects supervisor) (2010)
- Kadabra (TV Series) Fox International Channels (Colorist and Online Editor) (2010)
- Short Film - Colmillo - (Digital intermediate colorist) (2010)
- El capo (TV Series) (digital color grader - 2009)
