= Jon Russell Cring =

American film director

Jon Russell Cring (born February 10, 1971) is a director of films and television.

== Career ==
Cring has made 18 features since 2006. Many have premiered in film festivals all across the United States.

He also acts as a co-director on the TV series Point Society and producer on numerous other projects.

=== Filmography ===
- Announced – Sky Valley
- 2023 – Wheelies INC
- 2021 – Girl in the Palms
- 2016 – Darcy
- 2015 – The Night We Met
- 2014 – Hobo Heyseus
- 2013 – Little Bi Peep
- 2012 – Creeping Crawling
- 2011 – And See All the People
- 2009 – The Drive
- 2009 – Four on the Floor
- 2008 – Wonderful
- 2008 – Melvyn's Clock
- 2008 – $6 Man
- 2008 – Has Been
- 2008 – Budd
- 2008 – Ought
- 2008 – Bernee
- 2008 – TOO
- 2008 – Summer's Morn
- 2006 – Lenders Morgan
- 2010 – Commons (TV series)

== Personal life ==
Born in Ohio, Cring now resides in Tuxedo Park, New York.
