= List of directors and producers of documentaries =

== Asia ==
- Sidiki Bakaba
- Safi Faye
- Sorious Samura (Cry Freetown, Return to Freetown, Exodus, Living with Hunger, Living with Refugees)
- Tareque Masud (Bangladesh)
- Aryana Farshad (Iran)
- Ammar Aziz (Pakistan)
- Anu Malhotra (India)
- Sadaf Foroughi (Iran)
- Suma Josson
- Susumu Hani
- Kazuo Hara
- Fumio Kamei
- Toshio Matsumoto
- Tatsuya Mori
- Shinsuke Ogawa
- Anand Patwardhan (India)
- Artavazd Ashoti Peleshyan (Armenian)
- David Perlov
- Mohammad Bakri (Palestine)
- Avi Mograbi (Israeli Moroccan)
- Nissim Mossek (Israel)
- Makoto Satō
- Noriaki Tsuchimoto
- Mikhail Vartanov (Armenia) (Parajanov: The Last Spring )
- Wang Bing
- Ruby Yang
- Maheen Zia (Pakistan)
- Anwar Hajher
- Satyaprakash Upadhyay (India) (Bunkar - The Last of the Varanasi Weavers)
- Zahir Raihan (Bangladesh)

== Australia ==
- Wayne Coles-Janess (In the Shadow of the Palms)
- George Gittoes (Soundtrack to War)
- John Pilger (Year Zero: The Silent Death of Cambodia, Vietnam: the Last Battle, Stealing a Nation)

== Europe ==
- Michael Apted (Seven Up!)
- Matthew Bauer (The Other Fellow)
- William Bemister
- Patrick Bokanowski
- António Campos
- Pedro Costa
- Adam Curtis (The Century of the Self, The Trap, The Power of Nightmares)
- Denis Delestrac (Pax Americana)
- Mike Dibb
- Vanessa Engle (Lefties)
- Harun Farocki
- Erik Gandini (Videocracy)
- James Gay-Rees (Senna, Amy, Ronaldo)
- Jo Gilbert (Great West End Theatres series)
- John Grierson
- Johannes Grenzfurthner
- Bert Haanstra
- Werner Herzog (Grizzly Man)
- Marcel Ichac (France, exploration and mountain films)
- Joris Ivens
- Asif Kapadia (Senna, Amy)
- Ross Kemp
- Sean Langan (Langan behind the Lines, Langan in Iraq, Travels of a Gringo)
- Claude Lanzmann (Shoah)
- Jørgen Leth (The Five Obstructions)
- Willy Lindwer (The Last Seven Months of Anne Frank)
- Sean McAllister, filmmaker (Liberace of Baghdad, The Minders)
- Chris Marker
- Arūnas Matelis (Before Flying Back to the Earth)
- James Miller (Death in Gaza)
- George Morrison (Mise Éire)
- Michel Noll
- Marcel Ophüls
- Jacques Perrin (Le Peuple Migrateur)
- Jos de Putter
- António Reis
- Alain Resnais (Night and Fog)
- Leni Riefenstahl
- Jean Rouch
- Michael Schindhelm (The Chinese Lives of Uli Sigg)
- Tomasz Sekielski (Tell No One)
- Marc Sinden (Great West End Theatres series)
- Louis Theroux
- Virgilio Tosi
- Agnés Varda
- Dziga Vertov
- Lars von Trier (The Five Obstructions)
- Peter Watkins (The War Game, Punishment Park, Culloden (film), Edvard Munch (film))
- Leslie Woodhead (Children of Beslan, A Cry from the Grave, Godless in America)
- Thierry Zéno
- Lydia Zimmermann

== Latin America ==
- Tomas Gutierrez Alea
- Santiago Álvarez
- Julia Bacha (Brazil)
- Fernando Birri
- Eduardo Montes-Bradley (Evita: The Documentary, Che: Rise and Fall, Waissman, Calzada, Samba on Your Feet)
- Patricio Guzman
- Miguel Littin
- Paul Leduc
- Fernando E. Solanas
- Salvador Espinosa Orozco (TEOKARI Compañero de Camino)

== North America ==
- Aryana Farshad (Mystic Iran, the Unseen World), ( Longing for the Soul, A Quest for Rumi-2019)
- Emile de Antonio
- Denys Arcand
- Timothy Asch (The Ax Fight)
- Joe Berlinger and Bruce Sinofsky (Brother's Keeper, Paradise Lost: The Child Murders at Robin Hood Hills, Metallica: Some Kind of Monster)
- Gilles Blais
- Les Blank (Burden of Dreams)
- Doug Block (51 Birch Street, Home Page)
- Michel Brault
- Sam Bozzo (Can You Hack It?)
- George Butler (Pumping Iron, In the Blood, Roving Mars, Shackleton's Antarctic Adventure, The Lord God Bird, Going Upriver: The Long War of John Kerry)
- Ken Burns (Baseball, Jazz, The Civil War)
- Ric Burns (New York: A Documentary Film)
- Jim Butterworth (Seoul Train)
- Steven Cantor (Step, Dancer, Between Me and My Mind, What Remains, Chasing Tyson)
- Chris Cashman (Club Frontera, San Diego's Gay Bar History)
- Lesley Chilcott (Waiting for 'Superman', An Inconvenient Truth, CodeGirl, Watson, Arnold)
- Jimmy Chin (Free Solo, Meru (film))
- Matthew Cooke (How to Make Money Selling Drugs)
- Merian C. Cooper and Ernest B. Schoedsack
- Patrick Creadon (Wordplay, I.O.U.S.A.)
- George Csicsery
- Khashyar Darvich (Dalai Lama Renaissance)
- Peter Davis (director) (Hearts and Minds (film))
- Kirby Dick (Sick: The Life and Death of Bob Flanagan, Supermasochist, Twist of Faith, This Film Is Not Yet Rated, Outrage)
- Paul Devlin (SlamNation, Power Trip)
- Chris Donahue (Be Good, Smile Pretty)
- Dinesh D'Souza (2016: Obama's America, America: Imagine the World Without Her)
- Ava DuVernay (13th (film))
- Lilibet Foster (Soul in the Hole, Speaking in Strings, Brotherhood: Life in the FDNY, Be Here Now (The Andy Whitfield Story))
- Robert J. Flaherty
- Su Friedrich (Hide and Seek)
- Liz Garbus (What Happened, Miss Simone?)
- Paul Gardner (writer)
- Robert Gardner (Dead Birds)
- Catherine Gund (A Touch of Greatness), (Born To Fly: Elizabeth Streb vs. Gravity)
- Lauren Greenfield (Thin, kids+money)
- Gilles Groulx
- Monica Hampton (Slacker Uprising, Heavy Metal in Baghdad)
- Nathaniel Hansen
- Mark Jonathan Harris (The Long Way Home, Into the Arms of Strangers: Stories of the Kindertransport)
- Tigre Hill (The Shame of A City, Barrel of a Gun)
- John E. Hudgens (American Scary)
- Leslie Iwerks (The Pixar Story, Recycled Life)
- Steve James (Hoop Dreams)
- Kartemquin Films (Gordon Quinn, Jerry Blumenthal, Steve James, Peter Gilbert, et al.)
- Myles Kane (Voyuer)
- Mary Rosanne Katzke
- Tim Kirkman (Dear Jesse)
- Vivian Kleiman
- Barbara Kopple (Harlan County, USA, American Dream, both Academy Award winners)
- Josh Koury (Standing by Yourself, Voyeur)
- Martin Kunert (Voices of Iraq)
- Richard Leacock
- Grace Lee (American Revolutionary: The Evolution of Grace Lee Boggs)
- Logan Leistikow (The Comedy Garage)
- Avi Lewis
- Brian Lindstrom (Alien Boy: The Life and Death of James Chasse)
- James Longley (Iraq in Fragments)
- Kevin Macdonald (One Day in September, Touching the Void)
- Eric Manes (Voices of Iraq)
- Ron Mann (Comic Book Confidential, Twist, Grass)
- John Marshall (The Hunters)
- Albert Maysles and David Maysles (Salesman, Grey Gardens, Gimme Shelter)
- Ross McElwee (Time Indefinite, Sherman's March)
- Freida Lee Mock (Maya Lin: A Strong Clear Vision, an Academy Award winner; Bird by Bird with Annie, a portrait of Anne Lamott)
- Eduardo Montes-Bradley (Evita, Che: Rise and Fall)
- Michael Moore (Roger & Me, Bowling for Columbine, Fahrenheit 9/11, The Big One, Sicko)
- Errol Morris (The Thin Blue Line, Vernon, Florida, Fast, Cheap and Out of Control, The Fog of War)
- John Mulholland (Cooper & Hemingway: The True Gen)
- Alanis Obomsawin
- Charles Olivier (Magic & Bird: A Courtship of Rivals)
- Joshua Oppenheimer (The Act of Killing, The Look of Silence)
- D. A. Pennebaker (Dont Look Back, Monterey Pop)
- Pierre Perrault
- Phil Ranstrom (Cheat You Fair: The Story of Maxwell Street)
- Frances Reid (Long Night's Journey Into Day)
- Velcrow Ripper (Scared Sacred)
- Steven Rosenbaum (7 Days in September)
- Alex Sangha (Canada) (My Name Was January, Emergence: Out of the Shadows)
- Jillian Schlesinger (Maidentrip: A Teen's Solo Voyage Around The World)
- Steven Sebring (Patti Smith: Dream of Life)
- Amy Serrano (The Sugar Babies)
- Christopher Seufert
- Jeff Chiba Stearns
- Ondi Timoner (We Live in Public, DIG!)
- Michael Wadleigh (Woodstock (film))
- Lucy Walker (Devil's Playground, Blindsight)
- Reid Williams (Dangerous Living: Coming Out in the Developing World, Cruel and Unusual: Transgender Women in Prison, Were the World Mine)
- Frederick Wiseman (High School, Titicut Follies)
- Ruby Yang (The Blood of Yingzhou District), (My Voice, My Life)
- Jessica Yu (Breathing Lessons: The Life and Work of Mark O'Brien)
