= Second product syndrome =

Business concept

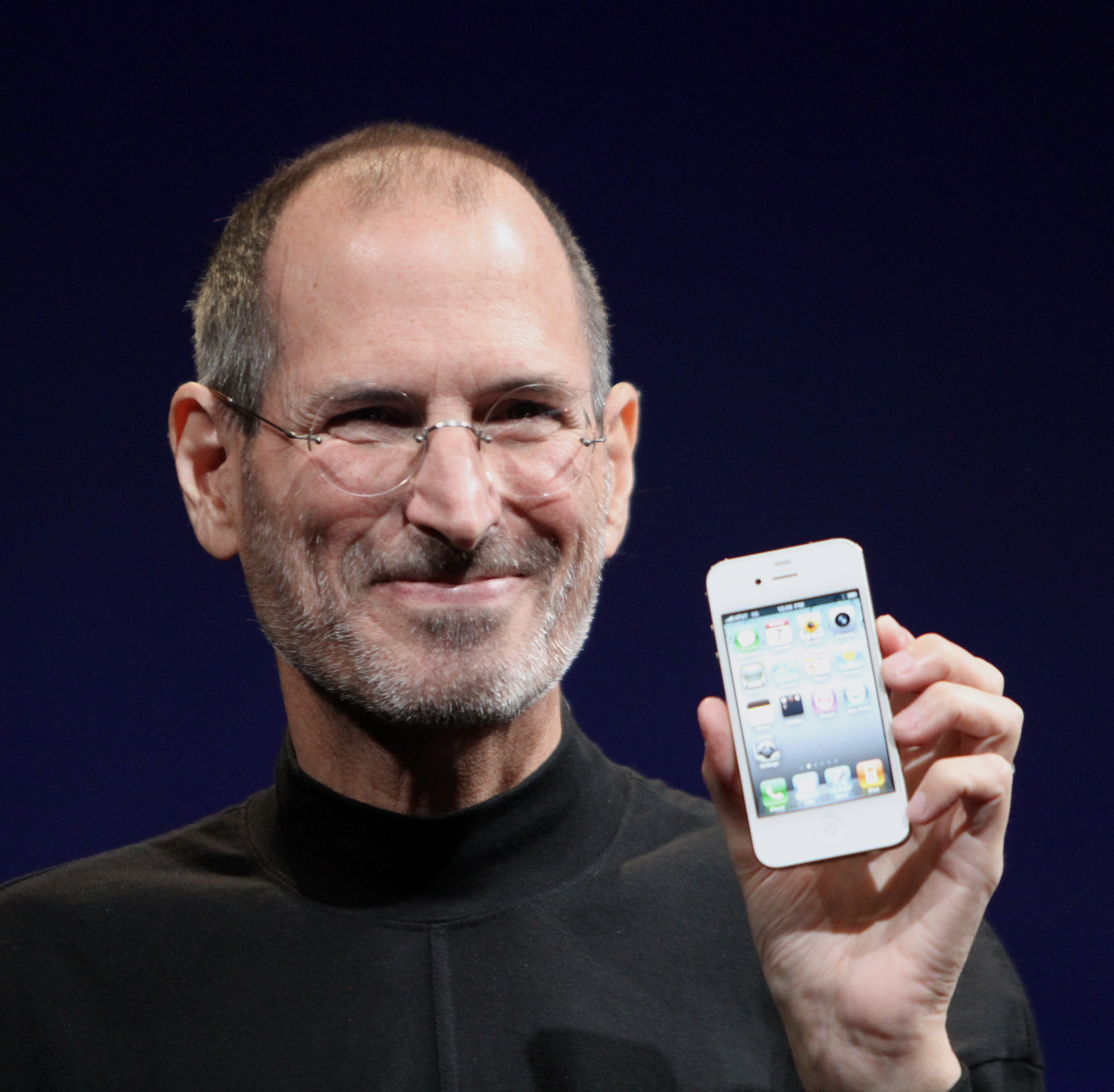
Steve Jobs

Second product syndrome (also referred to as second-product syndrome or second product failure syndrome) is a business concept introduced by Steve Jobs in the documentary The Pixar Story. Steve Jobs describes the concept as when the company comes up with a very successful first product, it becomes more ambitious and boastful. The company then decides to go ahead with the second product without actually investigating and understanding the reason behind their first product's success. Therefore, the second product often ends up as a failure.

Jobs stated his experience of second product syndrome at the technology company Apple as "I lived through Apple -the Apple II was incredibly successful and Apple III was a dud- and I've seen a lot of companies not make it through that."

== Background ==
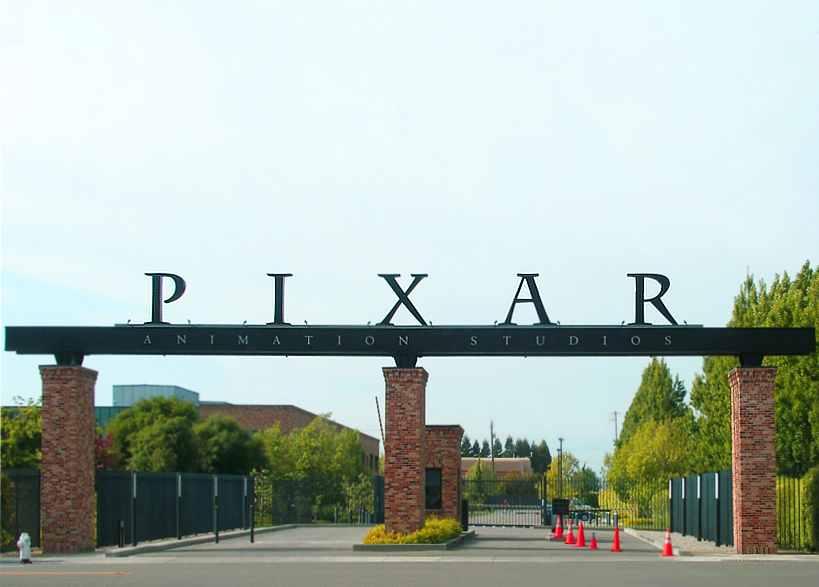
Pixar animation studio

The concept of second product syndrome was introduced by Steve Jobs during his time in Pixar, an American computer animation film studio under Disney Studios. The first movie introduced by Pixar was Toy Story which was a huge success at the time. After the movie, Pixar's ambition multiplied and the company was determined to prove Toy Story's success was not a one-time hit. Pixar then decided its second film would be based on insects and named the movie A Bug's Life.

The information about Pixar's second movie was leaked to the former employee of Disney Jeffrey Katzenberg who worked at DreamWorks at the time. Katzenberg then decided to use the same concepts of insects in their new movie Antz featuring a group of ants. When accused by the furious Jobs of stealing Pixar's idea, Katzenberg admitted that he had sped up the production of Antz as a way to compete against his former colleagues at Disney because DreamWorks’ first movie The Prince of Egypt was scheduled to be released for Thanksgiving 1998, which was on the same weekend as A Bug's Life. Katzenberg wanted to rush Antz into launch to put pressure on Pixar and compelled Pixar to change its release date for A Bug's Life. When received an offer from Katzenberg that DreamWorks would delay the production of Antz if Pixar would move A Bug's Life so it would not compete against The Prince of Egypt, Steve Jobs was determined and refused to change the movie's release date. Under great pressure, no one at Pixar backed down. A Bug's Life was released at the beginning of October 1998, six weeks after DreamWorks released their movie Antz. A Bug's Life had a more epic plot and achieved two times as much profit as Antz.

After the success of Pixar's second movie, Jobs recognised the importance of A Bug's Life's success. It not only beat Antz in the sales and profit, more importantly, it proved Pixar's success does not stop at its first product. Jobs later introduced the concept of the deadly second product syndrome for a company's second product and stated: "There is a classic thing in business, which is the second-product syndrome. I was very concerned about our second product. My feeling was, if we got through our second film, we'd made it. The first one was the most risky, but after that, the second one was pretty close to it".

== Definition ==
Second product syndrome is the phenomenon experienced by new entrepreneurs shortly after their previous success in their first product when they encounter the first business failure in their second product. New entrepreneurs are fascinated by the idea of creating a second product to continue the success of the first product. However, their businesses fail to attract the market with their second product because they never really understood the reason the first product was able to resonate with the marketplace in the first place.

According to Jobs, a successful first product does not guarantee the success of the second product of the company based on the fact that the first product was successful. When the company launched the second product, it had the same risk as to the first one. If the company desires to continue the success to the second product, the company should not rely on the principle that might contribute to the first product's success but look at product development in a new way and in a case by case solution.

== Symptoms ==
According to Hollister from Harvard Business Review, the primary symptom of the second product syndrome would be company's inability to coordinate marketing and R&D as well as the belief that what succeeded for the first time verifies the assumptions of the management and guarantees the second product's success the next time around. According to Hollister:" The greater the first product's success, the more convinced managers are of their ability to introduce another winner." Managers suffer from second product syndrome often lose sight of the reason the first product was able to succeed and resonate with the market and aimed to conquer the market without a systematic and adequate analysis or gaining the crucial capabilities in the first place. They also fail to use the successful first product as the stepping-stone towards their second product's success by improving it or reducing its production cost.

== Reasons for failure ==
Businesses which suffer from second product syndrome often assume their second product will also be successful because they believe their previous success proves the wisdom of the management and guarantees the second product's success. However, the first product of the company usually is created by a relatively small and concentrated team with a single business objective and good communication flow. At this stage, the company does not need to concern about distractions from the maintenance of the company's ongoing operation or the pressure of making a new product compatible. When it comes to the design of the second product, the original team members' responsibilities change and they usually spend most of their time focusing on supervision and improvement of the current product line. Therefore, the communication of the second product becomes troublesome.

Companies also feel an irresistible desire and ambition to come up with and develop their second product without a systematic examination of the reason behind their first product's success. Steve Jobs states that as " And so with the second product, their ambition grow and they get much more grandiose, and their second product fails. It fails to resonate with the marketplace because they really did not understand why their first product resonated with the marketplace." In order to push the second product towards their already established mainstream customers, companies risk ignoring the product development approach and end up with a second product with no market fit. The companies fail to test and verify their assumptions for their second product as devotedly as they did for their first successful product.

The customers became stricter in the scrutiny process of the company's second product because of the success of its first product. Once risk-free application software and webpages in the first product face more scrutiny from both its existing and future customers-including those who are not early-adopters of the company's products. The fear of creating a second product which does not address the customer need and dilutes the brand image leads the companies to verify their assumptions and hypothesis on a very small percentage of their existing consumer before rushing the second product to a wider audience.

Companies can depend too much on the insights derived from their previous success and lose sight of the fact that the information and insights can be outdated and irrelevant to the second product development. Having these existing insights at hand can lead an overconfident entrepreneur into believing himself already knows about their target audience and not undertaking a second and in-depth analysis for the second product. Initial customers of a startup's first and second product may vary and the problems the company has to solve for customers may either have been addressed or needed to be addressed in a new way. Startups become victims of the second product syndrome if they assume the product development in one space fully meets all the needs of its customers.

Another reason leading to the second product syndrome is the existing costs of the businesses which limit their desire to test repeatedly of their new product fit in the market. To achieve cost minimisation, companies wish to use the same infrastructure, distribution channels and design of the first product for the second product. This method only works if the second product is manufactured using the same infrastructure, distributed via the same channels and have a similar aesthetics as the first product. Companies can become victims of the second product syndrome if they assume all the existing infrastructure, channel relationship and design style will be capable of adapting to all its future products.

Companies with a strong view and knowledge of the industry want to skip the tedious product development process and jump straight to its majority of customers rather than develop a suitable product with the market fit. However, vision and prior knowledge are only supplementary to a successful product. Ignoring to verify hypothesis may lead a business to produce an un-adopted product or spend a lot of money changing the product terminally. Companies fall into the victims of the second product syndrome if they fail to control their impulses and spend more time carving their second product upfront.

== In the start-up company ==
Parilee Edison suggested in his article "Second Product Syndrome" that many startup companies are influenced by the second product syndrome. When successful entrepreneurs succeeded in their first startup and created a great first product, the entrepreneurs then assumed that they can simply continue their success in the second startup rather than starting from a suitable second product with the market fit. Therefore, the second startup usually ends up in a dangerous situation. Usually, the degree of success of the first startup indicates the possibility of the second startup companies to fail. The more successful the first startup is, the more likely the second startup will be in the risk of failure. At the beginning, the ultimate goal of a startup its to generate a product with the market fit and the breadth of the company is very narrow. Serial entrepreneurs often ignore the narrow and complicated steps in their second startup and wish to move into more a challenging and exciting part such as "long term-strategy, sales and marketing, company culture and more" instead of starting from a core business idea. The company skips over the crucial details determining their second product's success and assumes what worked the first time will magically repeat itself again.

== See also ==
- Sophomore slump
