= Safe Passage (charity) =

Non-profit organization

Safe Passage / Camino Seguro is a majority Guatemalan-led, US-registered 501 (c)(3) organization that provides full-day education to youth primarily in Zone 7 and Zone 3 of Guatemala City, the area that borders the largest primary landfill in Central America. Adopting an international model for transformational education of the whole child, Safe Passage focus' on wellness, lifelong learning, vocational skills, and community leadership to help break the cycle of poverty, achieving a better future for its students, their families, and Guatemala.

== History ==
Safe Passage was founded in 1999 by Hanley Denning, a teacher and social worker from Maine who traveled to Guatemala to learn Spanish. While she was there, the woman with whom she was lodging told her that she wanted her to see the Guatemala City Garbage Dump. After seeing this, Hanley called home and asked her parents to sell her car, computer, and other belongings so that she could start a program to help the people of the dump. With around $5,000, she started a drop-in program in a church outside of the dump. Approximately 40 children showed up in the first week. People gave her a hard time at first, because others had tried to help them but had given up. She persevered and about six months later gained people's confidence.

Denning was killed on January 18, 2007, aged 36, when a bus with no brakes collided head-on with the car she was riding in. Her driver, a Guatemala native, was also killed. Two volunteers riding in the back seat of the car were injured. She was known by some as "El Angel del Basurero" or "The Angel of the Garbage Dump". One of Safe Passage's most recent additions is the Early Childhood Education, a program also known as the Escuelita, which hosts children from ages two through six, enhancing their health and school readiness, and ensuring the well-being of these children while their parents work.

== Mission ==
Safe Passage works to "combat poverty through education". The families of Safe Passage children scavenge through the Guatemala City Dump for items to resell. The organization works to enroll these children in the public schools. The public schools are technically free, but students must provide their own books, supplies, and uniforms, at a cost that is prohibitive for these poor people. The school day in Guatemala runs a half-day, so Safe Passage runs a support program for the other half of the day. Students come to Safe Passage for the half of the day that they are not in school. There they are separated by class level and do activities that reinforce what they are learning school. They receive a snack and lunch. If students miss less than three days of school a month and less than three days at the program, their family receives a food bag, with the equivalent of what money the child would likely have earned if not in school.

== Fundraising ==
Safe Passage is fueled by the generous support of individuals from around the world, corporate partners, and grants. Every gift goes towards equipping aspiring and resilient youth in Guatemala to grow, thrive, and define their futures. Its annual budget is around $2.7M to $3M to provide nearly 600 youth annually with specialized and culturally affirming education from early childhood through high school, nutrition and health services, mental health and mindfulness, leadership development, and career, vocational, and higher educational supports and mentorship programming. Safe Passage continues to employ a fundraising approach based on grass-roots relational philanthropy. Over the course of 2025 it has worked to expand local philanthropy in Guatemala through in-kind donations as well as fiscal support.

== Volunteering ==
Safe Passage/Camino Seguro values the contributions of visitors, volunteers, and support teams that have come from around the world and have been part of building Safe Passage into what it is today. Visits are an opportunity to understand the challenges faced by the community Safe Passage serves and to explore possible collaborations that promote better opportunities for students and their families. These visits are an opportunity to build connections between Safe Passage and those who share the same commitment to positive change. They are also a way to align collaborations for the future, ensuring that Safe Passage's resources and efforts generate even greater impact.

Visitors: An individual who takes a guided tour (approximately 2 hours) of Safe Passage’s facilities and programs to learn about the organization and explore collaboration options. Visitors must be 14 or older and accompanied by an adult.

Support Teams: Safe Passage’s third party travel agency partner provides Support Team coordination in Guatemala. Support Teams require a team leader, and can be made up of individuals, employee teams, foundation representatives, faith-based institutions, and academic partners. Team members are recommended to be at least 18 years of age and accompanied by one chaperone for each minor.

== Hanley Denning ==
Hanley Graham Denning (March 9, 1970 – January 18, 2007) was the founder of Safe Passage. Born in Yarmouth, Maine, Denning graduated from Cumberland Center's Greely High School in 1988 and began attending Bowdoin College in Brunswick. She graduated from Bowdoin in 1992 with a degree in Psychology. After graduating from Bowdoin, she received her master's degree in Education at Wheelock College. After graduating from Wheelock, she began her career as a social worker in North Carolina. Many of Denning's students were Spanish-speaking, leaving her frustrated because she had difficulty understanding them.

In 1997, with the hopes of being able to improve her Spanish, Denning traveled to Guatemala to volunteer and visited a Guatemala City garbage dump. At the dump, children were digging through the piles of trash looking for anything they could eat, sell, or use for shelter. None of these kids were going to school because they could not afford the uniforms, supplies, and other miscellaneous costs. Denning sold her car and laptop and used the money to open Safe Passage in a nearby church. Within its first seven years, Safe Passage grew to provide services to nearly 500 youth, built its own educational reinforcement center, and opened an early childhood learning center.

On January 18, 2007, aged 36, Denning was killed in a car accident when the vehicle in which she was riding outside Guatemala City was hit head-on by a bus with failing brakes. Denning received commendations from the United States Senate and Maine State Senate for her work with the children and families of the Guatemala City garbage dump.

== Recycled Life documentary film ==
The Academy-Award-nominated short documentary Recycled Life by Leslie Iwerks and Mike Glad focuses on the lives of those who work in the Guatemala City garbage dump. Denning appeared briefly as herself in the film, and the DVD includes a special video tribute to her. The documentary was shown on HBO in late 2007.
