= Foos =

Foos is a surname of German origin. Notable people with the surname include:

- Dominic Foos (born 1997), German golfer
- Gerald Foos, American hotelier
- Reva Foos (born 1993), German swimmer
- Richard Foos, American business owner
- Ron Foos, American bassist

== See also ==
- Foo Fighters, a rock band from Seattle
