= Sean Langan =

British journalist and documentary-maker

- Born: 1964 (age 61–62); United Kingdom
- Occupations: Journalist and documentary filmmaker

Sean Langan (born 1964) is a British journalist and documentary film-maker. Langan works in dangerous and volatile situations; including environments noted for war, conflict and civil unrest. In 2008 he was kidnapped along with his translator while filming in the Afghanistan-Pakistan border region. They were freed three months later after Langan's family had negotiated their release.

== Ransom ==
BAFTA nominee Sean Langan, who was working for Channel 4's "Dispatches" television series when he was abducted in March by the Taliban in the Afghanistan-Pakistan border, was "safe and well" after release on 21 June 2008 in Islamabad, Pakistan. At the time he was 43.

Langan was held hostage by the Taliban for 12 weeks after trying to make contact with Al-Qaeda's second in command, as he searched for associates of Osama bin Laden. Langan stated he believed Channel 4 paid "compensation" to those who held him for his release. In his first broadcast interview since the release, Channel 4 News presenter Jon Snow asked whether a ransom had been paid. Langan replied: "No. I think a bit of compensation, not to the Taliban, but to some of the people in the house I believe, but I don't know." Channel 4's position was: "This was a very complex and delicate negotiation and Channel 4 provided Sean's family with support and expert advice. We don't think it is appropriate to go into the detail of the dialogue that was necessary to secure Sean's release. We shared information with the Foreign Office throughout this process."

After suffering mock executions, Langan and his translator Sami were freed and sent back to Britain: "I thought it would be a miracle if I got out of there alive. Death was at my door every night. It makes you see your life like never before. It was a constant barrage. They could hear machine guns, anti-aircraft guns and rocket-propelled grenades going off the whole time. But they weren't being shot in a contact [firefight] – it sounded like training. The door would be kicked in in the middle of the night and they'd tell the translator that they were going to behead us.'" He lost 19 kilograms due to dysentery at a Pakistan's Federally Administered Tribal Area (FATA) mountain. Imprisoned in a small, darkened basement cell, which had a hole in the ground for a toilet, they were brought 2 meals a day of bread and "stringy" meat.

The Foreign Office was "furious" at the ransom of Langan, for it "will increase the risk of Britons being kidnapped in future."

== Criticism ==
In March 2024, Australian Broadcasting Corporation aired Langan's documentary titled "Ukraine's War: The Other Side," which has been criticised by Ukrainian ambassador Vasyl Myroshnychenko as the "journalistic equivalent of a bowl of vomit". He argued that it repeated the Russian justification for the war in Ukraine and structured it to favour the Russian side. The ABC has defended its position with a spokesperson stating "we believe Australian audiences also have the right to watch it and make up their own minds."

The media criticised the film for promoting Russian propaganda and for Langan allowing the Russian occupation forces to express their propaganda without challenging them.

== Films ==
- Ukraine's War: The Other Side (2024) – ITV1
- Coming Home: Bowe Bergdahl versus the United States (2017) – BBC Four
- African Railway (2010) – BBC Two / BBC Four
- Fighting The Taliban (2007) – Channel 4
- Meeting The Taliban (2007) – Channel 4
- Afghan Ladies' Driving School (2006) – BBC Two / BBC Four
- Mission Accomplished (2004) – BBC Two / BBC Four
- Travels with a Gringo (2003) – Channel 4
- Langan in Zimbabwe (2002) – BBC Two / BBC Four
- Langan Behind The Lines (2001) – BBC Two
- Nightmare in Paradise (1998) – BBC Two

== Awards ==
- Fighting the Taliban won the 2007 Rory Peck Award for Features.
- Mission Accomplished was short-listed for an International Documentary Association (IDA) International Documentary Award for a feature documentary (2005) and a Rory Peck Award.
- Mission Accomplished was also voted one of the top ten Documentaries in the world in 2005 by the International Documentary Association.
- Langan Behind the Lines was short-listed for a BAFTA, a Grierson Award; from the Grierson Documentary Film Awards which were established in memory of pioneering documentary film-maker John Grierson, and a One World Media Award from the One World Broadcasting Trust.

== See also ==
- Cinéma vérité
- Lists of directors and producers of documentaries
- List of kidnappings
- List of solved missing person cases (2000s)
