= Gerald Foos =

American hotel owner

Gerald Foos is the former owner of the Manor House Motel, which operated in Aurora, Colorado. He was the subject of Gay Talese's 2016 article "The Voyeur's Motel" in The New Yorker, in which Talese disclosed that Foos was a long time voyeur of people staying in his motel, having installed grilles in the ceiling of most of the rooms that enabled him to view his guests without their knowledge, and doing so for 29 years beginning in the winter of 1966. Foos's observational focus was the sexual activities of those staying at the Manor House.

Both Talese's publication of the article and Foos's actions sparked controversy. Foos justified his actions as a means of conducting research concerning sexual behaviors. Talese released a book about Foos and his motel in July 2016, also titled The Voyeur's Motel.

In April 2016, Steven Spielberg purchased the rights to create a film based on Foos's life, with director Sam Mendes tapped to direct. The film was cancelled in November 2016 after Spielberg and Mendes learned of an upcoming documentary feature about the same subject. In regard to the decision to cancel the film, Mendes expressed frustration that no one had advised them of the documentary's existence, but said "it has so many things that are wonderful and can only be achieved by a documentary...the story became infinitely more interesting and more complicated, but impossible to tell in a narrative movie."

The New Yorker article was expanded into a book by the same name. Concerning the book, author and critic Michelle Dean wrote in The Nation:

[S]hortly before the book appeared, The Washington Post published an article [by Paul Farhi] that called Foos's veracity into question. The reporter pointed out that Foos hadn't owned the hotel for part of the time recorded in his journals. Talese, confronted with this information, did nothing less than freak out. "I'm not going to promote this book," he told Farhi. "How dare I promote it when its credibility is down the toilet?"

However, Talese discovered that Earl Ballard, the person who had owned the motel for that period (from 1980 to 1983) was still alive, and contacted him and reported that the person said that Foos had a key and complete access over this period. Talese stated that he had overreacted. Foos claimed that he had not brought it up as he had not wanted this person's name connected to the voyeurism. The documentary film, directed by Myles Kane and Josh Koury, was released on Netflix December 1, 2017, with the title Voyeur.
