= The Imagineering Story =

2019 American documentary television miniseries

- Genre: Documentary
- Created by: Leslie Iwerks
- Written by: Mark Catalena
- Directed by: Leslie Iwerks
- Narrated by: Angela Bassett
- Composer: Jeffrey Kryka
- Country of origin: United States
- Original language: English
- No. of seasons: 1
- No. of episodes: 6

Production
- Executive producer: Leslie Iwerks
- Producer: Michael E. Tang
- Editors: Mark Catalena; Mo Stoebe; Ian Arthur
- Production companies: Iwerks & Co.

Original release
- Network: Disney+
- Release: November 12, 2019

The Imagineering Story is a documentary series created, directed and executive produced by Leslie Iwerks. The series is focused on Walt Disney Imagineering and takes an in-depth look at the history and creation of the Disney theme parks and attractions around the world. The series premiered on Disney+ at the launch date of November 12, 2019.

In August 2026, Iwerks announced that a second season of the series will premiere in early 2028 on Disney+.

== Production ==
Originally announced as a feature documentary in 2013, the Walt Disney Company CEO Bob Iger announced that the film was being revamped as a series of six one-hour episodes for the upcoming Disney+ streaming service. In April 2019, the series was formally announced. In August 2019, it was announced that Angela Bassett would be narrating the series.

== Episodes ==
No.	Title	Directed by	Written by	Original release date
1	"The Happiest Place on Earth"	Leslie Iwerks	Mark Catalena	November 12, 2019
Focuses on the creation and evolution of Disneyland and its attractions up until Walt Disney's death, as well as Imagineering's involvement with the 1964 New York World's Fair.
2	"What Would Walt Do?"	Leslie Iwerks	Mark Catalena	November 15, 2019
Topics covered include Roy Disney's supervision over the construction and opening of Walt Disney World and Magic Kingdom, the subsequent conception of Epcot Center, and the first international expansion with Tokyo Disneyland.
3	"The Midas Touch"	Leslie Iwerks	Mark Catalena	November 22, 2019
Topics covered include Michael Eisner and Frank Wells' takeover of Disney, the addition of Disney-MGM Studios, the building and initial failure of Euro Disneyland, and Wells' death.
4	"Hit or Miss"	Leslie Iwerks	Mark Catalena	November 29, 2019
Topics covered include the success of Disney Cruise Line, Disney's Animal Kingdom, and Tokyo DisneySea (with inputs from Wing Chao); the unrealized projects of Disney's America and WestCOT; and the failures of Disney's California Adventure, Walt Disney Studios Park, and Hong Kong Disneyland.
5	"A Carousel of Progress"	Leslie Iwerks	Mark Catalena	December 6, 2019
Topics covered include Bob Iger stepping in as CEO, the overhaul of California Adventure, the creation of Cars Land, the revamping of Disney attractions such as Haunted Mansion Holiday, adding Jack Sparrow to Pirates of the Caribbean, and the initial outcry of the addition of Disney characters to the Disneyland version of "It's a Small World", the creation of Mystic Manor, Ratatouille: L'Aventure Totalement Toquée de Rémy, and the announcement of Shanghai Disneyland.
6	"To Infinity and Beyond"	Leslie Iwerks	Mark Catalena	December 13, 2019
Topics range from the groundbreaking of Shanghai Disneyland, Pandora – The World of Avatar, Guardians of the Galaxy – Mission: Breakout!, Star Wars: Galaxy's Edge and future upcoming projects.

== Release ==
The Imagineering Story premiered on November 12, 2019, on Disney+, in the United States and in the United Kingdom on March 24, 2020.

A supplemental book based on the series written by Iwerks entitled The Imagineering Story: The Official Biography of Walt Disney Imagineering was published by Disney Editions on November 8, 2022.

== Reception ==
=== Critical reception ===
The review aggregator website Rotten Tomatoes reported a 100% approval rating for the series with an average rating of 6.84/10, based on 13 reviews. Metacritic, which uses a weighted average, assigned a score of 62 out of 100 based on 7 critics, indicating "generally favorable reviews".

Joel Keller of Decider praised the series for depicting the construction and development of Walt Disney World in Florida, and the achievements of Disney employees working at Walt Disney Imagineering, but said that the documentary could have been more lively. Melissa Camacho of Common Sense Media rated the documentary 3 out of 5 stars, stating: "The Imagineering Story is a documentary series about the creative teams that conceptualize, design, and build Disney theme parks and their best attractions. It highlights the importance of pushing boundaries and being creative, and the role of STEAM principles in this process." Gretchen Smail of IGN rated the series 6.5 out of 10, praised the documentary and found it interesting for providing information and anecdotes on the history of Disney parks, stated that the series forms a tribute to the people who created and worked on Disney's parks and attractions that highlights their innovative contributions, but said that the documentary does not engage with the history of the Walt Disney Company with enough balance.

=== Accolades ===
Year	Award	Category	Nominee(s)	Result	Ref.
2020	Primetime Emmy Awards	Outstanding Narrator	Angela Bassett ("The Happiest Place on Earth")	Nominated	
2020	Online Film & Television Association TV Awards	Best Voice-Over Performance in an Animated Program	Angela Bassett	Nominated	
