= William Bemister =

British documentary film maker and journalist

- William Bemister
- Born: 28 June 1948; United Kingdom
- Died: 13 November 2008 (aged 60); United Kingdom
- Education: St George's College, Weybridge; University of Oxford (Undergraduate Diploma in Film Studies)
- Occupations: Journalist, documentary filmmaker
- Employer(s): Australian Broadcasting Corporation, News Limited, The Observer, BBC, others
- Notable work: The Hunter and the Hunted *The Confessions of Ronald Biggs *Admissible Evidence
- Awards: News & Documentary Emmy Award (1981); CINE Golden Eagle Award (1982)

William Bemister (28 June 1948 – 13 November 2008) was a British documentary film maker and journalist.

== Rhodesia ==
After brief service in the ranks with the regular British Army's Intelligence Corps, then the Corps' Territorial Army airborne unit, and the civil staff of the Metropolitan Police Commissioner's Office at New Scotland Yard in the 1960s, Bemister started his journalism career with the politically liberal Rhodesia Herald and Sunday Mail newspaper group in pre-independence Rhodesia before joining the Rhodesian Broadcasting Corporation and its television subsidiary, RTV in Salisbury as a news sub-editor. He also contributed to the later banned African nationalist newspaper Moto.

== New Zealand and Australia ==
In 1974, he moved to New Zealand and worked as a general reporter for the tabloid NZ Truth, known in the early 1970s for its exposé journalism and investigative reporting. He then immigrated to Australia where he joined Rupert Murdoch's News Limited newspaper titles: The Truth (formerly Melbourne's investigative tabloid, allegedly generating substantial profits, which contributed to Murdoch's acquisition of the British News of the World), the Sydney Sunday Telegraph, and the national daily, The Australian.

He returned to the broadcast media with the Australian Broadcasting Commission in both Melbourne and Sydney and the Australian Ten Television Network as Special Investigative Producer in Sydney.

== Television ==
As an independent television journalist, Bemister's first film was The Confessions of Ronald Biggs, a documentary about the fugitive British train robber Ronald Biggs, who was then living in Brazil.

Bemister's co-produced 90-minute film The Hunter and the Hunted, about Nazi war criminals, their whereabouts, and the Nazi hunters who sought their arrest and prosecution, was commissioned by the Australian Seven Network and filmed on location in South America, France, Germany, Israel and the UK. Included in the film were scenes identifying the then home in La Paz, Bolivia, of Klaus Barbie, former head of the Gestapo in Lyon, France, and the first confirmation by a Bolivian law officer of Barbie's true identity.

Barbie had been living under the alias Klaus Altmann, and while the Paris Nazi hunters Serge and Beate Klarsfeld had identified him in Bolivia in 1971, the government there had always refused requests to extradite him to France. In a filmed interview with Bemister, La Paz District Attorney Gaston Ladesma admitted that Altmann had confessed to him that he was Klaus Barbie. On 19 January 1983, 14 months after The Hunter and the Hunted was telecast on network television in the United States that a new moderate government in Bolivia deported Barbie to France to stand trial.

The film also contained the only filmed interview of SS-Standartenführer Walter Rauff (who has been called "arguably the most wanted Nazi fugitive then alive"). In 1979, Bemister traced Rauff to a small bungalow in a suburb of the Chilean capital, Santiago, near a house occupied by his son and grandchildren. A few hours later Bemister found himself on the wrong side of a jammed garden gate to the son's house as the former SS Standartenführer Walter Rauff sought entry from the street, while a nearby surveillance camera team filmed the whole encounter. Unaware of Bemister's hidden microphone, Rauff gave his only filmed interview, joking about Nazi hunter Simon Wiesenthal: "We are all old (presumably referring to other Nazis) and failing him in clients".

Adolf Eichmann's son Horst also controversially discusses the case against his father in the film. A 58-minute version of the film was later telecast on PBS in the United States for which Bemister won the 1981 Emmy for Outstanding Investigative Journalism on U.S. Network Television and a 1982 CINE Golden Eagle Award.

Bemister's other international producer credits include Philby on Thames Television in Britain, Moscow's Man for Sveriges Television, WDR-Fernsehen in Germany, and the Discovery Channel worldwide; and the Home Box Office documentary special America Undercover: The Search for Dr Josef Mengele for which he worked as Producer-Correspondent. He was also Investigative Reporter for Fremantle Media's The Seven Million Dollar Fugitive.

His productions for Australian television networks include a two-hour feature documentary, Spy Trap, telecast by the Australian Broadcasting Corporation; the one-hour documentary special Psychic Visions of the Future, a cynical look at the world's alleged psychics for the Australian Ten Television Network, and Warriors of the Deep, a docudrama about the Japanese midget submarine attack into the heart of Sydney Harbor in 1942, then the base for American and Australian warships. This film was telecast by the Australian Seven Network.

== Cinema feature project ==
In 2008, Bemister embarked on the production of a 120-minute 'cross genre' factual feature film entitled Admissible Evidence, which planned to incorporate cinematographic and photographic evidence, satellite mapping of crime loci, ground penetrating radar, electronic and human intelligence, and other forensic evidence to identify World War II (Great Patriotic War) German war criminals and their collaborators, including members of the Romanian Army and Police.

The project planned to incorporate evidence of some scientists in face, gait, and voice recognition from the United States, Sweden and Germany, and investigators 'cold case' Nazi war crimes committed between 1938 and 1945, including new evidence of murders of Jewish babies and burning of live victims in quicklime; such crimes were to be exposed for the first time, together with admissible evidence concerning each case.

The technologies, where possible, would have also identified Nazi victims: principally Jews, but also Slavs, Roma, homosexuals, psychiatric patients, pacifists including Quakers, Red Army prisoners-of-war, and unarmed civilians.

To redress cases where many thousands of alleged war criminals were not prosecuted, the film was to present forensic 'nano-evidence'. The film, a German, Russian, and UK co-production with the participation of other European organisations, was scheduled for production in 2009, and was the recipient of UK National Lottery Funding, through a grant from the British Government's Department of the Media, the UK Film Council, and Screen South.

The picture was to abandon the conventional British documentary format in favor of $4 million production values and the style of a forensic/detective procedural drama with four-camera cinematography, innovative mis-en-scene and lighting, the most advanced visual effects - commonly used in big budget adventure features - and rapid editing.

It was not planned that the film would address armed partisan actions, but was to side-bar Soviet NKVD war crimes, the very few war crimes committed by the Allies, and as a postscript, review the cases of organizations, scientific academics, and reactionary historians who attempted to 'red flag' the production.

The future of the project is uncertain since Bemister's death.

== Other biography ==
In 2007, his work featured in Richard Trank's documentary I Have Never Forgotten You: The Life & Legacy of Simon Wiesenthal. More recently, with American, German, and Swedish colleagues, he carried out studies into experimental forensic technologies for Admissible Evidence.

Bemister was a life member of the Oxford University Film Foundation, and a member of the National Academy of Television Arts and Sciences, New York, and the Frontline Club, London. He was also an Associate Member of the Oxford University Society. He was educated at St George's College, Weybridge, England, and received the Undergraduate Diploma in Film Studies at the University of Oxford.

Throughout his life, Bemister suffered from intermittent bipolar disorder. He helped to establish the "Equilibrium" foundation, which promotes research about the condition. He was married briefly in 1995.

== See also ==
- Lists of directors and producers of documentaries
