= Walter Rauff =

German SS officer in Nazi Germany (1906–1984)

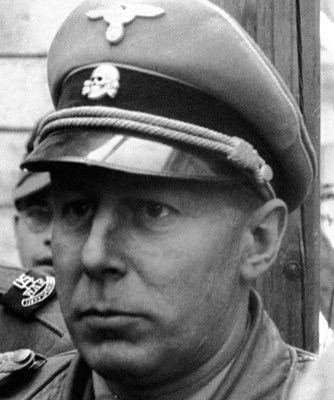
- Rauff in 1945
- Born: 19 June 1906; Köthen, Germany
- Died: 14 May 1984 (aged 77); Santiago, Chile
- Military career
- Allegiance: Weimar Republic; Nazi Germany; Syrian Republic; West Germany; Chile
- Branch: Reichsmarine; Kriegsmarine; Schutzstaffel; Bundesnachrichtendienst; Dirección de Inteligencia Nacional
- Rank: SS-Standartenführer (Schutzstaffel); Korvettenkapitän (Kriegsmarine)
- Conflicts: World War II

Hermann Julius Walther Rauff, also Walther Rauff (19 June 1906 – 14 May 1984) was a mid-ranking SS commander in Nazi Germany. From January 1938, he was an aide of Reinhard Heydrich firstly in the Security Service (Sicherheitsdienst or SD), later in the Reich Security Main Office.

Rauff is accused of being responsible for nearly 100,000 deaths during World War II. Among other actions, he was instrumental in the use of mobile gas chambers for the execution of prisoners. He was arrested in 1945 and placed in an Allied internment camp in Italy, but escaped and was never brought to trial.

Beginning in the late 1940s, Rauff worked for intelligence and security services in several countries. In 1948, he was recruited by Syrian intelligence and subsequently by the Israeli secret service. He sailed to South America in December 1949 and landed in Ecuador, initially living in Quito for almost ten years. He departed in 1958 and travelled to Chile before returning to Germany in 1960, to collect his German Navy pension. After this Rauff was recruited by Augusto Pinochet. Rauff played a role in the creation of the Chilean internal security apparatus during the military dictatorship. He also worked for the Federal Intelligence Service of West Germany (Bundesnachrichtendienst) between 1958 and 1962. His funeral in Santiago, Chile was attended by several former Nazis. Rauff was later described in a documentary on the History Channel as one of the seven most dangerous Nazis who had fled to South America after World War II.

== From the Navy to the SS ==
According to the MI5 file on Walter Rauff released in 2005:

Rauff joined the Kriegsmarine (the German Navy) in 1924 as a young cadet. After a period of training as a midshipman he was promoted to Lieutenant in 1936 and given command of a minesweeper. He was a friend of Reinhard Heydrich, who also served in the Navy in the 1920s. Heydrich was hired by Schutzstaffel chief Heinrich Himmler in 1931 to serve as the head of the SS counter-intelligence system, and when Rauff resigned from the Navy in 1937, Heydrich took him under his wing. Rauff was given the job of putting the SS and its security service, the Sicherheitsdienst (SD), onto a war footing.

During his thirteen years in the Navy, Rauff became acquainted with Reinhard Heydrich and saw service in South America and Spain as a young officer in 1924.

In 1937, Rauff left the Navy following an adultery scandal, but he was discharged "with all honours", as he said in a 1972 deposition before a German prosecutor in Santiago de Chile.

Between 1940 and 1941, Rauff returned to the Navy as a volunteer, commanding a minesweeper flotilla in the English Channel. He was promoted to Lieutenant Commander (Korvettenkapitän) in April 1941, shortly before he was discharged from active service, and then returned to the Reich Security Main Office (RSHA). During early 1940, he headed the SD in German-occupied Norway for few months.

== Gas van engineering ==
In 1941 and 1942, Rauff was directly involved in the design and development of gas vans, mobile gas chambers used to kill, by poisoning or suffocation, those people deemed enemies of the German state: Jews, disabled people, communists and others. According to declassified CIA documents:

As an official of the Criminal Technical Institute of the Reich Security Main Office, Rauff designed gas vans used to murder Jews and persons with disabilities.

The MI5 file is more explicit concerning Rauff's "technical" skills:

Rauff supervised the modification of scores of trucks, with the assistance of a Berlin chassis builder, to divert their exhaust fumes into airtight chambers in the back of the vehicles. The victims were then poisoned and/or asphyxiated from the carbon monoxide accumulating within the truck compartment as the vehicle travelled to a burial site. The trucks could carry between 25 and 60 people at a time.

In 1972, in Santiago de Chile, Rauff gave a deposition as a witness before a German prosecutor. On the subject of the extermination of Jews in Poland and Russia, asked whether at that time he had any doubts concerning the use of gas vans, Rauff answered:

Ob ich damals Bedenken gegen den Einsat [sic] der Gaswagen hatte, kann ich nicht sagen. Für mich stand damals im Vordergrund, dass die Erschiessungen für die Männer, die damit befasst wurden, eine erhebliche Belastung darstellten und dass diese Belastung durch den Einsatz der Gaswagen entfiel. [Whether I had any doubts against using the Gaswagen, I cannot say. The main issue for me at the time was that the shootings were a considerable burden for the men who were in charge thereof and that this burden was taken off them through the use of the gas vans.]

Rauff delegated the task of keeping the gas vans operating in the Soviet Union and other Nazi-occupied areas to an SS chemist, August Becker, who kept Rauff fully informed on the gas van killing operations.

== Persecution in Vichy-North Africa ==
Rauff was later involved in the persecution of Jews in Vichy France-controlled French protectorate of Tunisia during 1942 and 1943, by implementing the antisemitic Statute of the Jews enacted by the metropolitan Vichy state. A month after the Axis capture of Tobruk in June 1942, the SS set up a special extermination unit to follow in the wake of Rommel's Afrika Korps. The unit, commanded by Rauff, was empowered to carry out "executive measures on the civilian population", the Nazi euphemism for mass murder and enslavement. However, his mission to exterminate the Middle East's Jewish population was brought to an abrupt halt when the British Eighth Army defeated Erwin Rommel at El Alamein in October 1942.

Rommel was forced to withdraw the remnants of his army to Tunisia, where it sustained a bridgehead until May 1943, enabling Rauff's SS to start lower scale persecutions of local Jews. The MI5 file records that Rauff was posted to Vichy-Tunisia in 1942 as head of the SD office, where he led an Einsatzkommando (mobile killing squad) which conducted a "well-organised persecution campaign against the Jews and partisans".

Particularly hard hit was Tunisia, the only Arab country to come under direct German occupation. In just six months, from November 1942 to May 1943, the Germans and their local collaborators implemented a forced-labor regime, confiscations of property, hostage-taking, mass extortion, deportations, and executions. They required thousands of Jews in the countryside to wear the Star of David, and they created special Judenrat-like committees of Jewish leaders to implement Nazi policies under threat of imprisonment or death. Rauff's men also stole jewels, silver, gold and religious Jewish artifacts. Forty-three kilogrammes of gold were taken from the Jewish community on the island of Djerba alone.

== Chief of the secret police in Northern Italy ==
In 1943, Rauff was sent to Milan where he took charge of all Gestapo and SD operations throughout northwest Italy. The MI5 file states:

In both these postings [Tunisia and northern Italy] Rauff rapidly gained a reputation for utter ruthlessness. In Tunis and Italy he was responsible for the indiscriminate execution of both Jews and local partisans. His work in Italy involved imposing total German control on Milan, Turin, and Genoa. His success in this task earned him the congratulations of his SS superior, who described it as 'a superb achievement'.

Rauff remained in Italy until the end of the war. The MI5 file states:

He narrowly avoided being lynched by an Italian mob, having barricaded himself and a number of other SS officers into the Hotel Regina in Milan. He was arrested by Allied troops and sent to a prisoner of war camp.

His interrogator in the POW camp ended his report with these words:

Rauff has brought his organisation of political gangsterism to stream-lined perfection and is proud of the fact. By nature cynical and overbearing, but cunning and shifty rather than intelligent, he regards his past activities as a matter of course.

According to Rauff's declassified CIA file:

Near the end of the war Rauff, then the senior SS and police official in northern Italy, tried to gain credit for the surrender of German forces in Italy, but ended up only surrendering himself. After escaping from an American internment camp in Rimini, Rauff hid in a number of Italian convents, apparently under the protection of Bishop Alois Hudal.

== Spying activities in the Middle East ==
In 1948, he was recruited by Syrian intelligence and went to Damascus, where he served as military advisor to President Husni al-Za'im when they fought against the newly established State of Israel, only to fall out of favour after a coup a year later. Rauff managed to convince his captors that he was only an advisor and had no command powers; he was released but ordered to leave the country. After barely escaping from Syria, Rauff fled to Lebanon and later back to Italy, and gained a transit pass for Ecuador, where he and his family settled, later moving to Chile.

== Sailing to Ecuador and out of Europe ==
In December 1949, Rauff made it out of Europe and sailed for Ecuador. This was a place Rauff would live until 1958, residing in Quito and working for numerous German businesses in a professional setting.

It is noted Rauff is said to have worked for a while for Israeli intelligence before Mossad was formed. The 2007 book On the Trail of Nazi War Criminals Who Weren’t Punished by Mossad operative Yossi Chen (Chinitz), indicates that Rauff provided intelligence from Syria and was handled by Shalhevet Freier, of the Foreign Ministry. Rauff was paid for this work.

A CIA report, dated 24 March 1950, states that Israeli agent Edmond (Ted) Cross of the Israeli Service was working to employ former Nazis for observation and penetration in the Arab countries. At the time, Rauff was living in Quito. One of the plans included sending Rauff to Egypt. One report indicated that Rauff did not reach Egypt, but a 1953 memo stated that an operative, most likely Rauff, was in the country at that time. An earlier CIA report, from February 1950, stated that Cross helped Rauff obtain the necessary papers for settling in South America (entering by Argentina) and added: "It is not improbable that Subject's presence in Syria was in connection with a mission for the Israel[i] service". Rauff was working in Syria, as an advisor to President Za'im, but left the country after Zai'm was deposed.

== Advisor to the regime in Chile ==
Nazi hunter Simon Wiesenthal holding a picture of Nazi war criminal Walter Rauff in May 1973.

Rauff left Ecuador in 1958 and moved to Chile. In 1958, Rauff took on two roles: one as the manager of a king crab cannery in Punta Arenas, which is one of the southernmost towns in the world, and another as a merchant in Quito, Ecuador. However, this was only his civilian career. Rauff had been brought to Chile by then Major Augusto Pinochet as an "international expert" to organize Chile's internal security apparatus. To this end, Rauff functioned as head of a whole group of German former SS and Gestapo officers who worked in various advisory functions to the Chilean military.

Between 1958 and 1963, Rauff was employed by the Federal Intelligence Service of West Germany (Bundesnachrichtendienst or BND) and received 70,000 DM from the agency. To conceal his activities as a spy in South America, he posed as an export manager and agent for Importadora Goldmann, a company in Santiago, Chile. His point of contact within the BND was Wilhelm Beissner, also known as Bertram, who served as a paymaster for the BND and had known Rauff since their time working together in the Reich Security Main Office. Rauff was eventually warned and removed from the BND before his arrest in Chile. However, he managed to recover some legal fees from the BND, totaling 3,200 DM. Additionally, he received 15,000 DM to start a new business.

Initially, the recruitment of Rauff appeared promising due to his extensive travels, but his reports ultimately proved to be of little value. He was evaluated as "untrustworthy" (charakterlich äußerst unzuverlässig), "intriguer" (er konspirierte nach allen Seiten), and "drunkard" (eng mit dem Alkohol befreundet). As a result, Rauff was dismissed from the BND in October 1962, although some communication channels remained open until July 1963.

In 1960, Rauff made a trip to Germany, in order to claim his pension for the time which he had served in the Reichsmarine, and he had no trouble with the German authorities. In 1998, Germany passed a law outlawing the payment of World War II pensions to Nazis.

In December 1962, he was arrested by Chilean authorities after Germany requested his extradition, but he was freed by a Chilean Supreme Court decision five months later in 1963 on the grounds that his crimes had been committed too long ago. Salvador Allende's election as Chilean president in 1970 did not change the situation. In a friendly letter to Nazi hunter Simon Wiesenthal, Allende wrote that he could not reverse the Supreme Court's 1963 decision.

Former Mossad operative Yossi Chen (Chinitz) relates in his book that the agency attempted to capture Rauff in 1979, even visiting him at his home. The plan was to assassinate him and then issue a press release stating: "Today in Chile, we executed one of the greatest Nazi war criminals – commander of the Gestapo’s technical department who developed and directed the mobile gas vans in which more than 100,000 Jews were exterminated. We are a group of those who will never forget the Nazis’ crimes so we decided, in the name of justice, to execute him". This plan failed.

After the military coup of 1973, Rauff became more directly engaged with the new regime's internal security apparatus. He worked as direct assistant to Manuel Contreras and gave advice on the creation of the secret police Dirección de Inteligencia Nacional (DINA). Rauff was valued as an expert for the Solución Final, meaning the killing and disappearance of dissidents. Rauff planned and supervised the building of concentration camps and was involved in finding means of disposing the dead bodies of tortured and murdered dissidents. He allegedly used contacts to former German military officers to smuggle sarin to Chile. Rauff also was involved in the creation of Operation Condor. Former DINA and Chilean military personnel later detailed that Rauff was strongly involved with Contreras' work and acted as executive command officer in DINA.

When Hans Strack, the German ambassador to Chile, was ordered to request Rauff's extradition, Strack - a supporter of exiled war criminals - did not forward the application for his extradition until more than 14 months later. The delay allowed Chile to refuse the extradition request because the length of time elapsed since his crimes overran the country's statute of limitations.

Allegedly, CIA officials could not determine Rauff's exact position. Pinochet's regime resisted all calls for his extradition to stand trial in either West Germany or Israel. In the meantime, Rauff disappeared and was discovered by the documentary filmmaker William Bemister in Los Pozos, Santiago de Chile, in 1979, and interviewed.

The last request to extradite Rauff to West Germany was presented by Nazi hunter Beate Klarsfeld in 1983, but it was rejected by the Pinochet regime, which alleged that Rauff had been a peaceful Chilean citizen for over twenty years and stated that the case was closed since the Supreme Court's 1963 decision. Klarsfeld organised protests in Chile and was twice arrested for causing disturbances. Following her brief detention, the director-general of Israel's Ministry of Foreign Affairs, David Kimche, officially requested Rauff's expulsion in a meeting with Chilean Foreign Minister Jaime del Valle, but the request was turned down.

== Death ==
Suffering from lung cancer, Rauff died in Santiago on 14 May 1984 from a heart attack. His funeral was held at a Lutheran church and was the occasion of a Nazi celebration. According to his MI5 file, "he never showed any remorse for his actions, which he described as those of 'a mere technical administrator.'"

A German-language biography of Rauff written by Martin Cüppers was published in 2013.

== See also ==
- List of Nazi Party leaders and officials
- Denazification
- Nuremberg Trials
