= Standing by Yourself =

- Directed by: Josh Koury
- Produced by: Josh Koury
- Starring: Adam Koury; Josh Siegfried
- Cinematography: Josh Koury
- Edited by: Josh Koury
- Music by: Stanley Oh
- Production company: Brooklyn Underground Films
- Distributed by: Cheapo Films
- Release date: May 15, 2002
- Running time: 65 minutes
- Country: United States
- Language: English
- Budget: $1,000
- Box office: $2,500

Standing by Yourself is a 2002 documentary that marked the directing debut of filmmaker Josh Koury. Set in Clinton, New York, a suburb of Utica, the film follows Koury's maladjusted teenage younger brother and his rambunctious best friend Josh, who share social and economic frustrations of living in a small town. They express their pent-up energy and anger through pranks, loitering and mild acts of rebellion, but their friendship is ruptured when Josh's behavior spirals out of control and he gets in trouble with the law. By the film's end, the once-inseparable friends barely know each other as they move into different social spheres.

Koury began Standing By Yourself as a 20-minute senior project at Pratt Institute. The film was expanded to 57 minutes for presentation at the 2002 Slamdance Film Festival, where it was nominated for the Grand Jury Prize. The total budget for the finished film was reportedly U.S.$1,000

Standing By Yourself had its theatrical debut in New York in May 2002, where it received strong reviews for its harsh glimpse of alienated and seemingly self-destructive youth. Dave Kehr of the New York Times praised it as "quietly devastating" while Scott Foundas of Variety stated that Koury's work "has its finger on something particularly potent" and Donald J. Levit of ReelTalk Reviews stated "Koury's unsparing art mirrors life, and one must shudder for the future."

Standing By Yourself played on the festival circuit in 2002, but did not have additional theatrical engagements. To date, the film has not been released on DVD. Koury went on to co-found the Brooklyn Underground Film Festival, and returned to filmmaking in 2008 with the documentary We Are Wizards.
