= Sorious Samura =

Sierra Leonean journalist

- Born: 27 October 1963 (age 62)
- Citizenship: Sierra Leone
- Occupations: Journalist, Film director

Sorious Samura (born 27 October 1963) is a Sierra Leonean journalist. He is best known for two CNN documentary films: Cry Freetown (2000) and Exodus from Africa (2001). The self-funded Cry Freetown depicts the most brutal period of the civil war in Sierra Leone with RUF rebels capturing the capital city (January 1999). The film won, among other awards, an Emmy Award and a Peabody. Exodus from Africa shows the harrowing effort by the best of young African male blood to break through to Europe via death- and danger-ridden paths from Sierra Leone and Nigeria, via Mali, the Sahara desert, Algeria, and Morocco through the Strait of Gibraltar to Spain.

In his recent two projects Living with Hunger and Living with Refugees (nominated for an Emmy award), he takes reality television to its extreme, becoming the central character in the films by living the lifestyle of an Ethiopian villager and Sudanese refugee respectively; in doing this, he tries to break the boundary between "us" (the people watching on TV) and "them" (those before the camera) by becoming one of them (albeit for just a month). Living with Corruption, his latest documentary to be shown on CNN, describes the shocking reality of how corruption is spread across society both in Sierra Leone and Kenya, affecting mostly the poor.

In 2010, Samura investigated attitudes to homosexuality in Africa in the Dispatches documentary Africa's Last Taboo, produced for Channel 4. Samura is also one of the directors of Insight News TV, an independent television production company in the UK focused on international current affairs programming.

Samura attended the Methodist Boys High School in the east end of Freetown. As of 2007, he works in London, UK, and considers both London and Freetown his hometowns.
