= Michael Schindhelm =

German-born Swiss author, filmmaker, and curator

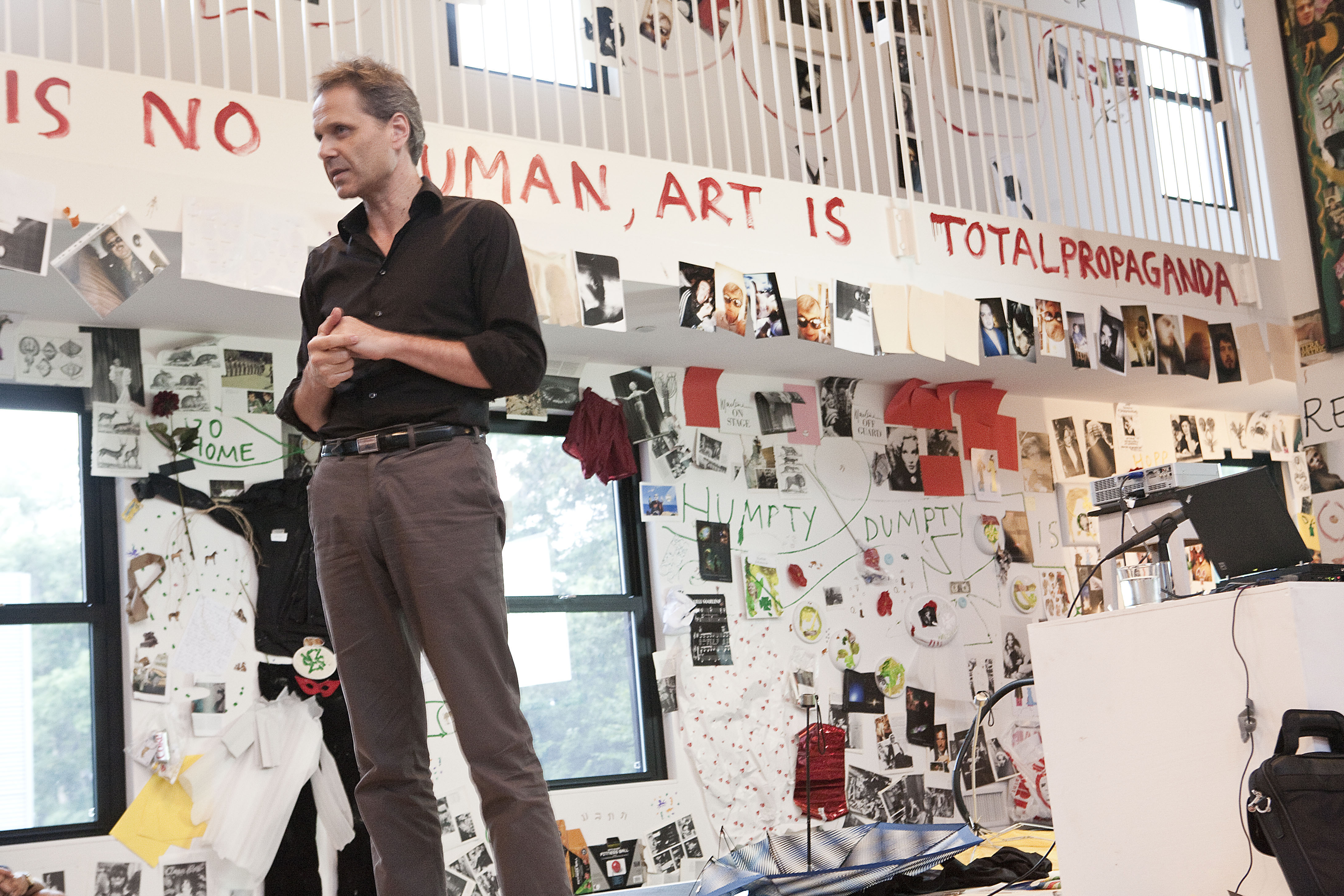
- Schindhelm in Long Island, USA (2008)
- Born: 1 October 1960 (age 66); Eisenach, Thuringia, Germany
- Occupations: Author, filmmaker and curator
- Website: https://michaelschindhelm.com/

Michael Schindhelm (born 1 October 1960 in Eisenach, Thuringia) is a German-born Swiss author, filmmaker and curator.

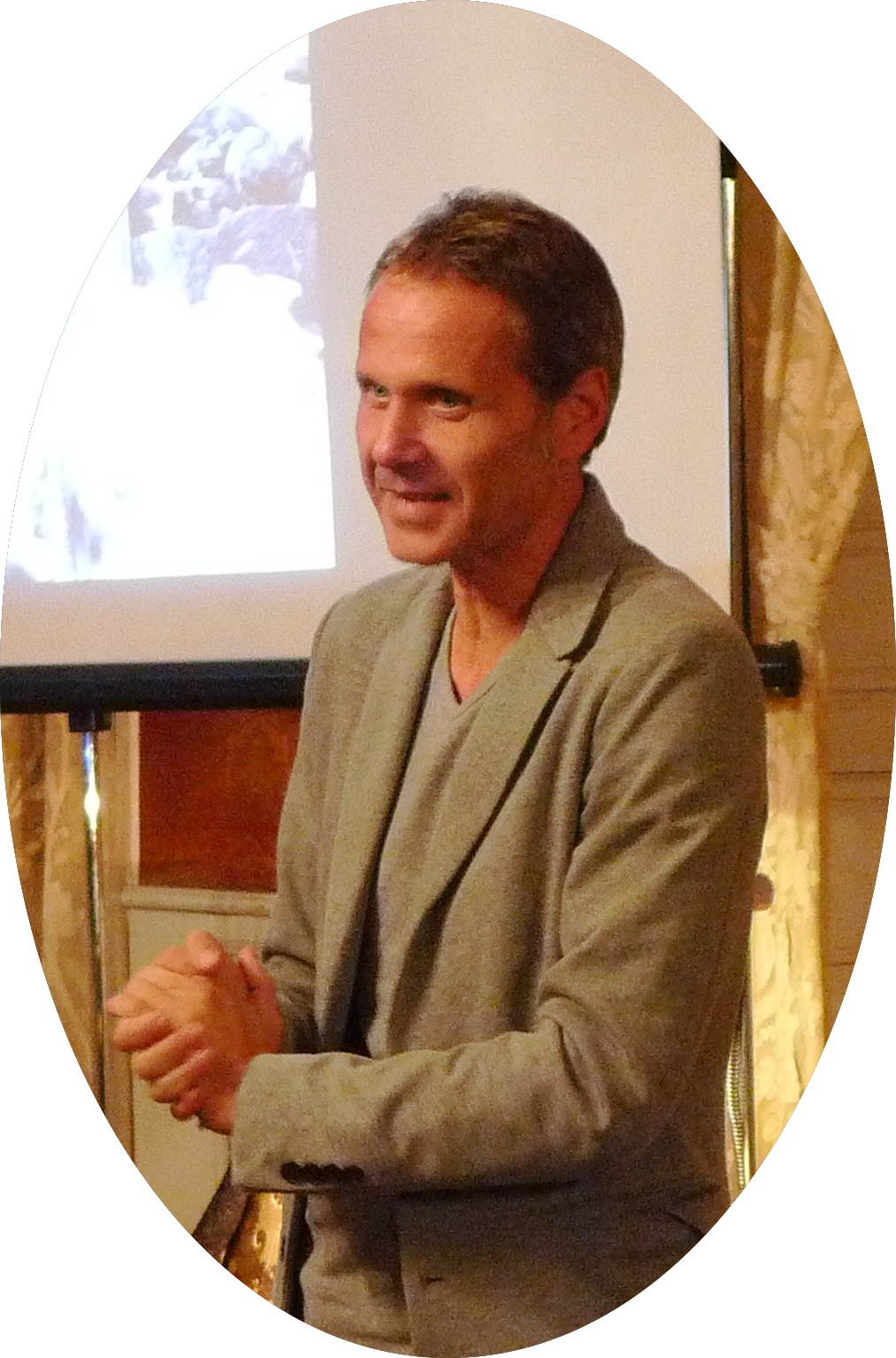
Schindhelm reading Dubai Speed

== Biography ==
=== Academic studies ===
Schindhelm grew up in the former GDR and completed his Abitur with an emphasis on chemistry. He studied at the Voronezh State University in the former Soviet Union graduating with a master's degree in quantum chemistry. From 1984 to 1986 he started his work as assistant professor for the Zentralinstitut für physikalische Chemie of the East Berlin Academy of Science where he worked in the department of theoretical chemistry (director: Lutz Zülicke) along with the current German chancellor Angela Merkel. He then worked as translator, author, and dramatic advisor until 1990.

=== Theater ===
In 1990, Schindhelm became advisor to the theater manager in Nordhausen, and then director of the Theater Nordhausen/Loh-Orchester Sondershausen Foundation. In 1992 he was appointed theatre director in Gera. From 1994 to 1996 he was founding Director General of the theater and opera house Theater & Philharmonie Thueringen in Gera and Altenburg. From 1996 to 2006 he acted as director of the Theater Basel (Switzerland), performing opera, drama, and ballet. Theater Basel was Theatre of the Year 1999 in the German-speaking countries and received the Bavarian Theatre Award in the same year and in 2001. From 1997 to 2005 he served also as president of the Sinfonieorchester Basel. In April 2005 he was appointed general director of the Opernstiftung (opera foundation) in Berlin. He acted as the first Director General of the newly founded Opernstiftung Berlin comprising Berlin's three opera houses (Komische Oper Berlin, Staatsoper Unter den Linden, Deutsche Oper Berlin).

=== Literature/film ===
Schindhelm continues to work as novelist, librettist, film documentarist and translator (Russian/German). He has published seven books since 2000 (fiction and non-fiction). His previous works include Lavapolis, a transmedia story published in German (Matthes & Seitz Berlin, 2014) and in English (Sternberg Press, 2014) which integrated a web platform lavapolis.com as well as a live participation at La Biennale di Venezia 2014, and Dubai Speed which has been published in German (dtv, 2009) and in English under the title Dubai High (Arabian Publishing, 2011). He wrote the opera libretto to Klaus Huber's Schwarzerde (Basel, 2001) on the Russian poet Osip Mandelstam and to Cong Su's Welten in Quecksilberlicht (Berlin, 2006) about the Chinese poet Gu Cheng. In 2003 he filmed the documentary Lied von der Steppe in the Gobi Desert in collaboration with Jörg Jeshel. Between 2003 and 2008, he filmed the documentary Birds Nest on the making of the Beijing National Stadium in collaboration with Christoph Schaub. In 2003 Schindhelm appeared as a TV anchorman and as a host in the Swiss German TV talk show Der Salon. He has translated works by Gogol, Chekhov and Mandelstam into German.

February 2016 saw the premiere of his film The Chinese Lives of Uli Sigg about the Swiss entrepreneur, philanthropist and art collector Uli Sigg who created the first joint venture of a Western corporation in China (1979 with Schindler Elevators) and the largest collection of contemporary Chinese art on the planet which he donated a part of to Hong Kong's M+ museum in 2012.

=== Cultural research, teaching, and consultancy ===
Schindhelm started work in Dubai in March 2007. One year later, he was appointed Cultural Director of the Dubai Culture and Arts Authority. His work there focused on the "Khor Dubai" project – the development of cultural infrastructure with museums and theaters along its famous creek.

He left Dubai in 2009 and became cultural advisor to public organizations in Asia and Europe. Since 2009 he consults for the Dutch architectural office OMA on the master plan for the large-scale development West Kowloon Cultural District, Hong Kong. In 2010 he collaborated with the think tank AMO on the conceptualization of the educational program for Strelka Institute, Moscow. From 2010 to 2012 worked as professor for the subject of public space at Strelka, Moscow. During this time he developed a proposal on culture and sports for the Innovation City of Skolkovo in Russia. Since 2012, he has been an advisor of international affairs at the Zurich University of the Arts and curator of a lecture series on global culture. Since 2013 he has been a board of trustees member with German charity organization Welthungerhilfe.

Schindhelm was listed by the Stasi as an 'unofficial contributor' in the 1980s. Disciplinary councils in Switzerland (2001) and Germany (2004) concurrently found that these contacts did not call into question Schindhelm's activities in public office. In 2006, Schindhelm received positive mention in German Chancellor Angela Merkel's 1st National Day public address.

Starting 2018, Schindhelm curates Dresden's application for the title of European Capital of Culture 2025.

== Publications ==
- In English: Dubai High (Arabian Publishing, London 2011), Lavapolis (Sternberg Press, New York, Berlin 2014).
- In German: Roberts Reise (dtv, Munich 2000), Zauber des Westens (DVA, Munich 2001), Das Kamel auf der Startbahn (Christoph Merian Verlag, Basel 2004), Die Herausforderung (DVA, Munich 2006), Mein Abenteuer Schweiz (Echtzeit Verlag, Zurich 2007), Dubai Speed (dtv, Munich 2009), Lavapolis (Matthes & Seitz, Berlin 2014), Letzter Vorhang (Theater der Zeit, Berlin 2017), Walter Spies – Ein exotisches Leben (Hirmer, München 2018)

== Films ==
- Chants of the Steppes (2004) about music of nomads in the desert Gobi (Mongolia).
- Bird's Nest (2008) on the making of Beijing's Olympic Games Stadium (designed by Swiss architectural firm Herzog&deMeuron).
- The Chinese Lives of Uli Sigg (2016) Theatrical Release February (Europe), March (Asia)
- Revolution in Medicine. Project Biontech (2021). Documentary about the founders of BioNTech and the creation of the first vaccine against COVID-19.
- Outland (2021). Ticino, Switzerland's Southern canton, as a refuge for the nonconformists and migrants of the past and the present.
- In the Mood for Art (2023). Documentary about the M+ museum and Hong Kong's art scene.

== Exhibitions ==
- 2008: Dubai Next, Vitra Museum Weil
- 2014: Friday in Venice, Architectural Biennale Venice
- 2018: Zurich Oracle, Audio-Intervention in public Spaces in Zurich
- 2019: Neue Heimat Dresden 2025, Deutsches Hygienemuseum Dresden
- 2022: Projekt Lightspeed, Deutsches Technikmuseum Berlin
- 2024: The End of Aging, KBH.G Basel
- 2024: Roots, KBH.G Basel
- 2025: After The Deluge, BiodiverCity, Interfinity Festival, Basel

== Awards ==
- 1999 Bavarian Theater Award (on behalf of Theater Basel)
- 2001 Bavarian Theater Award (on behalf of Theater Basel)
- Herbert Quandt Medien-Preis 2022 (for the documentary "Revolution in Medicine – Project BioNTech")
- Deutscher Wirtschaftsfilmpreis 2022 (for the documentary "Revolution in Medicine – Project BioNTech")
- Golden Pen of Swiss Association for Internal Communication 2023 for "In the Mood for Art"

== Opera librettos ==
- Schwarzerde by Klaus Huber (Basel, 2001) on the Russian poet Osip Mandelstam
- Welten in Quecksilberlicht by Cong Su, (Berlin, 2006) about the Chinese poet Gu Cheng

In 2003 Schindhelm appeared as a TV anchorman and as a host in the Swiss German TV talk show “Der Salon”. He has translated works by Gogol, Chekhov and Mandelstam into German.
