= Leslie Iwerks =

American film producer and director (born 1970)

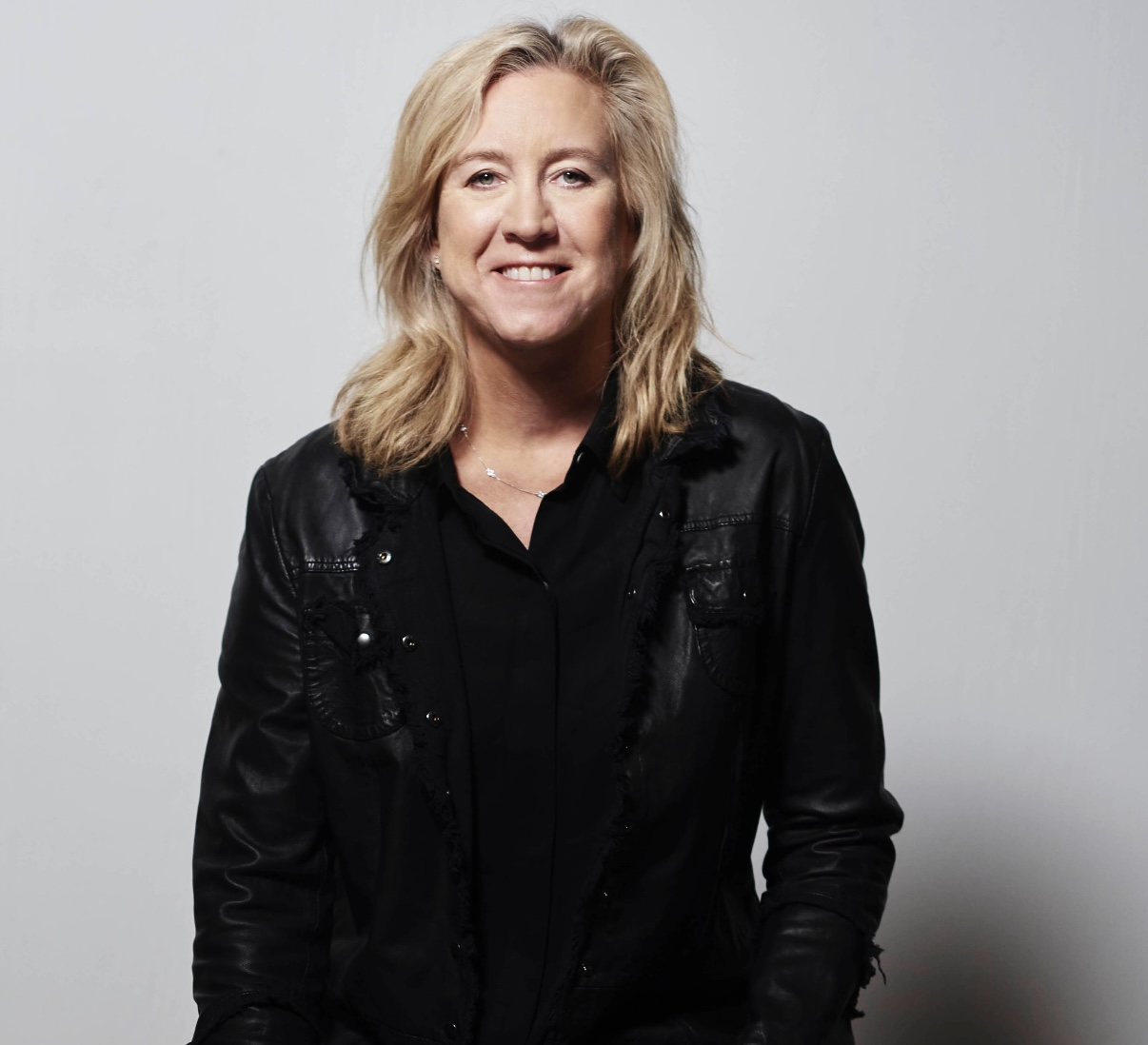
- Iwerks in 2007
- Born: April 22, 1970 (age 56); Los Angeles, California, U.S.
- Education: University of Southern California (BA)
- Occupations: Producer; director; screenwriter; cinematographer; editor
- Employer(s): Iwerks & Co
- Notable work: Recycled Life; The Pixar Story; The Imagineering Story; Disneyland Handcrafted
- Father: Don Iwerks
- Relatives: Ub Iwerks (grandfather)

Leslie Iwerks (/ˈaɪwɜːrks/ EYE-wurks; born April 22, 1970) is an American film producer, director, and screenwriter. She has directed numerous documentary films and streaming series, including the Academy Award-nominated Recycled Life, and the Emmy Award-nominated documentaries The Pixar Story and The Imagineering Story. In 2026 she released Disneyland Handcrafted, a documentary about the creation of Disneyland.

== Early life and education ==
Leslie Iwerk’s father Don Iwerks and grandfather Ub Iwerks were both Disney Legends. Ub Iwerks was the animator and co-creator of Mickey Mouse and Oswald the Lucky Rabbit. Leslie Iwerks graduated with a Bachelor of Arts from the University of Southern California.

== Career ==
In 1999, Walt Disney Pictures released her first feature-length documentary, The Hand Behind the Mouse: The Ub Iwerks Story, chronicling the life of her grandfather, Ub Iwerks. The film was narrated by Kelsey Grammer.

In 2000, Iwerks began working on ethnographic documentaries in Guatemala which resulted in the film Recycled Life (2006), which was nominated for the Academy Award for Best Documentary Short Film. The film documented the lives of Guatemalans who live and work in the largest landfill in Central America. The film was narrated by Edward James Olmos. Recycled Life raised an estimated $3 million for Safe Passage, a non-profit organization building schools for children who work in the dump.

The Pixar Story (2007), about the rise of Pixar Animation Studios was nominated for a Primetime Emmy Award in the Outstanding Nonfiction Special category and was additionally nominated for the A.C.E. Eddie Awards for Best Edited Documentary. The feature-length documentary was narrated by Stacy Keach and includes interviews with John Lasseter, Steve Jobs, Ed Catmull, George Lucas, Tom Hanks, and other producers, directors, and artists. Variety wrote, "The movie is, above all else, a celebration of animation in all its forms. Iwerks naturally has a firm grasp of the medium’s history and rightly sees Pixar as the catalyst for the recent resurgence of audience interest in animation."

Iwerks' 2008 short documentary Downstream is about the environmental effects of oil sands production in Alberta, Canada, as well as rare cancers being found downstream in the aboriginal community of Fort Chipewyan. Because the film scrutinized the local government's pro-oil policies and was partially subsidized by the Alberta Film Fund, it prompted Alberta's Minister of Culture, Lindsay Blackett, to criticize the film, which in turn, led to controversy about whether films subsidized by the government should be allowed freedom of artistic expression.

Iwerks released Industrial Light & Magic: Creating the Impossible (2010), which chronicles the developments of visual effects house Industrial Light & Magic from the earliest days of Star Wars to Star Trek Beyond. The documentary is narrated by Tom Cruise and features interviews with George Lucas, Steven Spielberg, Ron Howard, Robin Williams, J. J. Abrams, Jerry Bruckheimer, Samuel L. Jackson, Seth Green, Jon Favreau, and various ILM visual effects supervisors.

In 2011, the Biografilm Festival in Bologna, Italy, paid tribute to Iwerks through a multi-day retrospective of her documentary films.

Iwerks' short environmental documentary Pipe Dreams (2011), about the controversy behind the Keystone XL pipeline, was narrated by Daryl Hannah and won the Ashland Independent Film Festival award for Best Documentary Short.

Iwerks' 2012 documentary, Citizen Hearst, charting the 125-year history of the Hearst media empire, premiered at the Hamptons International Film Festival. The film is narrated by William H. Macy, and features interviews with Oprah Winfrey, Dan Rather, Mark Burnett, Ralph Lauren, Donna Karan, Bob Iger, Leonard Maltin, Dr. Oz, Heidi Klum and various members of the Hearst family and company.

In 2013, the San Luis Obispo International Film Festival showcased a retrospective of her documentary work, and honored her with the festival's Spotlight Award.

In 2016, she was honored by The Bay Foundation for her environmental impact through filmmaking. Additionally, she was commended by California Assemblymen Richard Bloom and Mike Giatto for her profound commitment to environmental stewardship through penetrating, exemplary documentary filmmaking addressing critical national and global issues.

Iwerks' 2016 documentary, Ella Brennan: Commanding the Table, about New Orleans restaurateur Ella Brennan premiered at the New Orleans Film Festival and won the Audience Award. The film is narrated by Patricia Clarkson, and includes interviews with Emeril Lagasse, Danny Meyer, Daniel Boulud, Drew Nieporent, Jeremiah Tower, and others. The film began streaming on Netflix in May 2017.

In 2017, Iwerks went to Macedonia where she uncovered the inside world of fake news created by Macedonian teenagers. The short film described how the proliferation of fake news impacted the U.S. 2016 Presidential Election and worldwide elections thereafter. Selling Lies was directed, edited, and produced by Iwerks. Morgan Freeman's production company Revelations Entertainment co-produced the film. The film, completed in 2018, premiered and won the Best Short Documentary at the Santa Barbara International Film Festival. The film went on to win Best Documentary Short at San Luis Obispo International Film Festival, Dumbo Film Festival, DOC LA, and Ridgefield Independent Film Festival.

In 2019, League of Legends Origins premiered on Netflix. The Iwerks directed feature-length documentary is about the online game League of Legends. In association with Riot Games, Iwerks spent four years documenting the ups and downs and global growth of the billion-dollar esports business and community that grew up around it.

In 2013, Iwerks began producing and directing a documentary series on the history of Walt Disney Imagineering, the division responsible for designing Disney theme parks and other attractions. The Imagineering Story premiered on the Disney+ streaming service at launch on November 12, 2019, with actress Angela Bassett narrating. The documentary series looks at the more than 65-year history of Walt Disney Imagineering through parallel storylines focused on the people, the craft, and the business. This was later followed by Disneyland Handcrafted, a feature-length documentary detailing the creation of Walt Disney's original California park, released during 2026 on Disney+ and YouTube.

== Philanthropy ==
Iwerks has worked with non-profit organizations Save Our Seas, Safe Passage, NRDC, and the Sierra Club to raise awareness on matters affecting the globe.

Iwerks is a member of the documentary branch of the Academy of Motion Picture Arts and Sciences, the Academy of Television Arts & Sciences, the Producers Guild of America, and the International Documentary Association. She is also a member of the USC School of Cinematic Arts Alumni Council.

== Filmography ==
Year	Film	Credited As	Awards/Film Festivals
1999	The Hand Behind the Mouse: The Ub Iwerks Story	producer, director, writer	Official Selection Buffalo International Film Festival, Official Selection Philadelphia Film Festival, Official Selection Santa Barbara International Film Festival, Official Selection Hiroshima International Animation Festival, Official Selection Florida Film Festival, Official Selection Annecy International Animated Film Festival
2004	The Ride	director, co-producer	Best Picture X-Dance Film Festival, Official Selection Hawaii International Film Festival
2006	Pixar's 20th Anniversary Special	executive producer, director, writer	
2006	Recycled Life	producer, director, writer, editor, cinematographer	Academy Award Nomination for Best Documentary Short, Best Documentary Short Tahoe/Reno International Film Festival, Best Documentary Short Newport Beach International Film Festival, Best Documentary Short San Luis Obispo International Film Festival, Best Documentary Short Ojai International Film Festival, Best Documentary Short Mendocino International Film Festival, Official Selection SXSW Film Festival, Official Selection Calgary Underground Film Festival
2007	The Pixar Story	producer, director, writer, editor	Emmy Nomination for Outstanding Nonfiction Special, A.C.E. Eddie Awards Nomination for Best Edited Documentary, Official Selection San Louis Obispo Film Festival, Official Selection Santa Barbara Film Festival, Official Selection Future Film Festival Bologna, Italy, Official Selection Annecy International Animated Film Festival
2008	Downstream	director, writer	Official Selection Ojai International Film Festival, Official Selection Edmonton International Film Festival, Official Selection Calgary International Film Festival
2009	Dirty Oil	producer, director, writer, editor	Official Selection Calgary International Film Festival, Official Selection Global Visions Film Festival, Official Selection Hamptons International Film Festival, Official Selection Tri Continental Film Festival, Official Selection Wakefield International Film Festival
2010	Industrial Light & Magic: Creating the Impossible	producer, director, writer, editor	Official Selection Future Film Festival Bologna, Italy, Official Selection Annecy International Animated Film Festival, Official Selection FMFX Computer Animation Festival Stuttgart, Germany
2011	Pipe Dreams	producer, director, writer, editor, cinematographer	Best Documentary Short Ashland Independent Film Festival, Official Selection Santa Barbara International Film Festival, Official Selection San Francisco Green Film Festival, Official Selection Omaha Film Festival, Official Selection Environmental Film Festival - Washington D.C.
2012	Citizen Hearst	producer, director, writer, editor	Official Selection Hamptons International Film Festival, Official Selection San Luis Obispo International Film Festival
2016	Ella Brennan: Commanding the Table	producer, director, writer, editor	Audience Award New Orleans Film Festival, Official Selection Mill Valley Film Festival, Official Selection Houston Cinema Arts Festival, Official Selection Santa Barbara International Film Festival, Official Selection Boulder International Film Festival, Official Selection Miami Film Festival, Official Selection San Luis Obispo Film Festival, Annapolis Film Festival
2018	Selling Lies	producer, director, editor	Best Documentary Short Santa Barbara International Film Festival, Best Documentary Short San Luis Obispo International Film Festival, Best Documentary Short March Dumbo Film Festival, Best Documentary Short DOC LA, Best Documentary Short Ridgefield Independent Film Festival
2019	League of Legends Origins	producer, director	
2019	The Imagineering Story	executive producer, director	
2023	Superpowered: The DC Story	executive producer, director	
2023	100 Years of Warner Bros.	executive producer, director	
2026	Disneyland Handcrafted	executive producer, director	
2026	Disney Worldbuilders	executive producer, director	
