= Watson (film) =

2019 film by Lesley Chilcott

- Theatrical release poster
- Directed by: Lesley Chilcott
- Produced by: Lesley Chilcott; Louise Runge; Wolfgang Knöpfler
- Starring: Paul Watson
- Cinematography: Logan Schneider
- Edited by: Greg Finton
- Music by: Christophe Beck
- Production companies: Participant; Terra mater Factual Studios; Real by Fake
- Distributed by: Participant Media
- Release date: April 28, 2019
- Running time: 99 minutes
- Countries: United States; Australia
- Language: English

Watson is a 2019 documentary film directed by Lesley Chilcott, which chronicles the life and activism of Canadian-American environmentalist Paul Watson, the youngest founding member of Greenpeace, and in 1977, the founder of the Sea Shepherd Conservation Society. The film premiered at the Tribeca Film Festival in April 2019 and was later released theatrically before airing on Animal Planet/Warner Bros. Discovery in December 2019 and into 2020.

== Synopsis ==
Filmed over two years across Costa Rica, Kingdom of Tonga, and the United States, the documentary chronicles Watson’s decades-long campaign to defend ocean and marine wildlife, and the personal costs of a life devoted to activism. Through action sequences, interviews, archival clips of Sea Shepherd’s encounters, and what Animal Planet described as “spectacular underwater nature footage,” Chilcott portrays his evolution from environmentalist to a polarizing figure confronting whalers and seal hunters. The film was produced by Participant Media and Terra Mater Factual Studios.

== Release and Distribution ==
Watson premiered at the Tribeca Film Festival in April 2019 and was later released theatrically before airing on Animal Planet on December 22, 2019.

== Reception ==
On the review aggregator website Rotten Tomatoes, 100% of 10 critics' reviews are positive, with an average rating of 7/10.

Critics praised the film’s compelling storytelling and message:

- The Los Angeles Times called it “a riveting documentary … required viewing for all.”
- The New York Times noted the film may be “deferential toward Watson, but it is never less than urgent.”
- The Hollywood Reporter praised the film’s juxtaposition of “gorgeous hi-res photography” and grainy visuals capturing encounters with marine destruction.
- Forbes wrote that the film “sheds light on more than just the plight of marine life, but also on the convictions driving Watson’s campaigns.”

=== Awards and nominations ===
Year	Association	Category	Result	Ref
2022	Friday Harbor Film Festival	Explorers & Adventures Audience Choice Award	Won	
2020	Cinema for Peace Awards	International Green Film Award	Nominated	
2020	International Wildlife Film Festival	Best Feature Film	Won	
2019	EarthxFilm Festival	Audience Award for Best Feature Film	Won	
2019	Camden International Film Festival	Harrell Award for Best Documentary Feature	Nominated	
2019	Hamptons International Film Festival	Zelda Penzel Giving Voice to the Voiceless Award	Won	
2019	Tribeca Film Festival	Best Documentary Feature	Nominated	
2019	Tribeca Film Festival	Audience Award for Documentary	Nominated	

== See also ==
- Marine conservation activism
- Sierra Club
- Whale Wars
- List of environmental films
