= Brooklyn Underground Film Festival =

New York film festival

The Brooklyn Underground Film Festival was an annual showcase of typically low-budget, under-distributed or amateur videos and metavideos. The festival was initially held in DUMBO, Brooklyn and later moved to Park Slope neighborhood of Brooklyn, New York. The festival ran from 2002-2007.

The festival also showed the work of emerging non-media artists. The first festival included a large wheat paste mural by the artist known as Swoon.

== History ==
The festival was founded in 2002 by graduates of Pratt Institute, Josh Koury, Myles Kane, Cris Moris and Gaia Cornwall. It was funded in part by a growing number of local businesses.

The festival ceased operations in 2007.
