= Voyeur (film) =

2017 American documentary film

- Directed by: Myles Kane; Josh Koury
- Produced by: Trisha Koury
- Starring: Gay Talese; Gerald Foos
- Cinematography: Cristobal Moris
- Edited by: Myles Kane; Josh Koury
- Music by: Joel Goodman
- Production companies: Brooklyn Underground Films; Chicago Media Project; Impact Partners; Public Record
- Distributed by: Netflix
- Release dates: October 4, 2017 (New York Film Festival); December 1, 2017
- Running time: 96 minutes
- Country: United States
- Language: English

Voyeur is a 2017 American documentary film directed by Myles Kane and Josh Koury and starring Gay Talese and Gerald Foos. It globally premiered as a Netflix Original documentary film in December 2017.

== Synopsis ==
Journalism icon Gay Talese reports on Gerald Foos, the owner of a motel in Aurora, Colorado, who allegedly secretly watched his guests with the aid of specially designed ceiling vents, peering from an "observation platform" he built in the motel's attic.

== Reception ==
Critical reviews have been mostly positive. Review aggregator Rotten Tomatoes gives the film a 79% approval rating, based on 28 reviews with an average rating of 6.5/10. The website's critical consensus reads, "Absorbing, unpredictable, and overall compelling, Voyeur is a singularly unusual — and utterly memorable — documentary experience." On Metacritic, the film holds a weighted average score of 59 out of 100, based on 12 critics, indicating "mixed or average" reviews.

Charles Bramesco wrote in Vulture, "Their documentary forms a sharp image of the thornier side to investigative journalism". Jordon Hoffman in Vanity Fair called it "a marvelous documentary" and said the film was "packed beyond vacancy with discussions of weighty topics like authorial intent, truth in journalism, and media manipulation." IndieWire had a more critical review, writing "Voyeur is so eager to tell a good story that it tells the wrong one".
