= CodeGirl =

Documentary film by Lesley Chilcott

- Directed by: Lesley Chilcott
- Produced by: Lesley Chilcott; Tiffany Haynes; Tracey Karka
- Cinematography: Logan Schneider
- Edited by: Steve Prestemon
- Music by: Peter G. Adams
- Distributed by: Filmbuff
- Release date: November 1, 2015
- Running time: 107 minutes
- Country: United States
- Language: English

CodeGirl is a 2015 American documentary film directed by Lesley Chilcott.

== Film description ==
CodeGirl is a documentary about high school-age girls from Brazil, India, Nigeria, and the United States who are competing in the Technovation contest, where participants have three months to make an app that fixes a problem in their community.

== Release ==
CodeGirl was released theatrically in Los Angeles, California on November 1, 2015. It was released on On Demand streaming platforms on November 6, 2015.

== Critical reception ==
CodeGirl has 60% critics' rating on Rotten Tomatoes. Katie Walsh from the Los Angeles Times wrote that although the film has steady pacing, it "lacks competitive drama". A review on The Hollywood Reporter criticized the film for not focusing on individual students "long enough to establish distinct characters".
