= Mary Rosanne Katzke =

American filmmaker, writer, and photographer

- Born: Minnesota, U.S.
- Occupations: Film producer, writer and photographer

Mary Rosanne Katzke is an American filmmaker, writer, and photographer known for Alaska-based documentaries bringing attention to various social and healthcare issues, including sexual assault, domestic violence, mental illness, homelessness, Alzheimer's disease, traumatic brain injury and breast cancer. Since 1982, she has produced four dozen grant-funded documentaries through her nonprofit production company Affinityfilms.

== Early life and education ==
Katzke was born in the mid-1950s and was raised in Southern Minnesota. In 1978, she graduated from the University of Texas, Austin, with a bachelor's degree in the department of Radio-Television-Film and then completed her master of fine arts degree in writing and directing in 1992 on scholarship at New York University Tisch School of the Arts.

Her interest in filmmaking began with her father, Gus, who taught her the skills needed to make her first home movies and 8mm films. Katzke has also been influenced by life events, including her mother's death of breast cancer in 1983 at age 52 and her diagnosis, less than a decade later, in 1992.

== Career ==
In 1981, Katzke produced her first documentary film, No Word for Rape, a film about sexual assault in urban and rural Alaska. The 16mm film about sexual assault in urban and rural Alaska was used by the Alaska Network of Domestic Violence & Sexual Assault (ANDVSA) for the next 20 years. It received several recognitions and grants, and the Alaska State Arts Council allowed her to produce five more documentaries on the topic, including domestic violence, homeless people, and safe winter driving.

In 1982, Katzke formed the nonprofit production company Affinityfilms, Funders with the funders including the American Film Institute, the National Endowment for the Humanities, the Corporation for Public Broadcasting, the Rasmuson Foundation, Vision Maker Media, Chicken & Egg Pictures, the Bristol Bay Native Corporation and the Alaska State Arts Council.

In addition to documentary work, Katzke has written short stories, essays, feature-film screenplays and has been a periodic contributor of opinion pieces to the Anchorage Daily News. She has written several screenplays that include I Will Fight Until I Melt, Linger Where You Land, and Birdman.

In 1988, Katzke wrote Dancing for the Hunter, a play based on the true-life stories of 17 women pursued and murdered by Alaskan baker and serial killer Robert Hansen. The project grew from interviews Katzke began while working on the documentary Fourth Avenue when some of her subjects told her about a string of exotic dancers who had recently disappeared and how no one seemed to care. Her script was drawn from audiotaped interviews she conducted with about 15 strippers during the year prior to Hansen's arrest. Dancing for the Hunter debuted at the 2005 Last Frontier Theatre Conference in Valdez and was noted in Backstage magazine.

== Influences ==
The work of American filmmaker and documentarian Frederick Wiseman has been an important influence in her filmmaking. Kelsea Habecker wrote in F Magazine that, like in Wiseman's films, "Katzke’s films do not utilize voiceover narrations to highlight the story. Instead, she allows the subjects to tell their own stories through their actions and discourse with the camera."

Others important to her development include Gary Holthaus, founding director of the Alaska Humanities Forum; John Sayles, independent film director, and Judith Helfand, documentary filmmaker and mentor.

== Films by theme ==
Unless otherwise noted, Katzke produced and directed the following works:

=== Sexual assault and domestic violence ===
Justice for Harriet (2021), produced by Katzke, is part of a series called Silent No More on missing and murdered Indigenous people in Alaska, and was made with support from the Bristol Bay Native Corporation and Sealaska Corporation.

Crescendo (1987), a half-hour documentary that addresses domestic violence, was supported by a grant from the American Film Institute and a community matching grant from the Anchorage Rotary Club.

No Word for Rape (1981), is a half-hour documentary addressing sexual assault in urban and rural Alaska. The film was selected for screenings across the country, including in Seattle and Chicago, and won several awards.

=== Environmental issues ===
Sea of Oil (1990), a documentary about the social and emotional impact of the Exxon Valdez Oil Spill, was screened at the Museum of Modern Art and was a 1991 Sundance Film Festival selection. The film aired nationally on Season 4 of PBS' POV Showcase in July 1991 and received a Silver Apple Award from the National Educational Film and Video Festival.

=== Resilience ===
Speaking from the Heart (2015), one of ten short documentaries Affinityfilms produced for The Arc of Anchorage, is the story of Raymond Severance, a man with disabilities who, in the 1950s, was found as an abandoned child wandering a desert road in Arizona and was taken in by a Native American family. The film follows his journey as an artist heavily influenced by how and where he grew up.

About Face: The Story of Gwendellin Bradshaw (2009) a feature-length documentary edited by Keiko Deguchi and scored by Joel Goodman, takes on five years of struggles for a woman facing the physical and mental repercussions of severe child abuse. The film premiered at Hot Docs in Toronto in 2008 and the Anchorage International Film Festival, where it received the Snow Dance Award for Best Documentary. The film also received a 2010 Award of Excellence in the Accolade Global Film Competition, feature documentary category.

=== Health ===
Not So Swell: Living with Lymphedema (2021) is a short documentary on a condition poorly acknowledged by the medical community, yet it impacts as many as 40 percent of cancer patients after treatment.

Partners in Healing (2017) is an introduction to integrative medicine.

In a Nanosecond (2017) is a documentary addressing brain injury awareness.

Backing Out of Time (2015) follows five families as they navigate caregiving for loved ones with Alzheimer's disease over the course of three years in Alaska, which has the fastest growing senior population in the United States.

Survive and Thrive (2010) is a video resource for women facing a breast cancer diagnosis and treatment, and features 11 long-term survivors sharing what they wish they'd known during the initial crisis of diagnosis.

The Quiet War (2007) was created as a resource for women facing metastatic breast cancer. The film won 1st place in Best Documentary at California's Reel Women International Film Festival March 2007.

Beyond Flowers: What to Say and Do When Someone You Know Has Breast Cancer (2003), directed and co-produced by Katzke, is a documentary for newly diagnosed breast cancer patients. Funded by the Susan G. Komen Foundation, the film received a "Best Health Media -- Long Form" award at the AVA Digital Video Awards Competition in Park City, Utah.

Between Us: A First Aid Kit for Your Heart and Soul (1998), co-produced and directed by Katzke, is a documentary for newly diagnosed breast cancer patients. "As a survivor, she wanted to direct a film that would help other victims get through the traumatic days or weeks between diagnosis and the first step of treatment, wrote Sandi Gerjevic of the Anchorage Daily News") Funders included the Susan Komen Foundation; Zeneca (maker of tamoxifen, used in breast cancer treatment), the Martin Lehrer Foundation and the Alaska Run for Women. The film was shown at New York Women in Film & TV’s 20-year retrospective, the 1998 Breckenridge Film Festival, the Fort Lauderdale Festivals and the Rocky Mountain Women's Film Festival, and was winner of an Independent Vision Award of $5,000 from Dockers.

=== Children / Growing Up ===
Fourteen (2016) follows six Alaskan children as they grow up from age 2 to 14, and is part of the Two by Two, More at Four, and Tricks at Six series.

World School: A Single Journey Can Change the Course of a Life (2013) follows Katzke's own journey with her 10-year-old son when they sell everything to travel the world for a year.

The Gift 1280 is a video short about spending an unplugged day in Alaska with a grandparent on her 90th birthday.

Inheritanceis a short film contrasting a child's reactions to visiting Alaska's Arctic National Wildlife Refuge with a visit to Ground Zero in New York City.

=== Indigenous Alaskans ===
Day in Our Bay: Voices & Views from Bristol Bay (2011) ), directed and co-produced by Katzke, is a compilation produced from dozens of crowdsourced personal videos showing one day in the life of the people of the Bristol Bay region of Alaska. All video was shot on October 15, 2011.

=== Displaced people ===
And Now We Rise (2019) is the biography of a young Athabascan hip-hop artist and community activist helping Alaska Native people stranded in Anchorage, many living in shelters or on the streets, reconnect with their families and get back home to their rural villages. As Matt Hickman of the Anchorage Press wrote, the film is "a portrait of an exceptional young activist, Samuel Johns, motivated to help his Alaska Native community to lead sober, productive lives."

Fourth Avenue (1985) documents the battle around displaced rural people on the streets of Anchorage as Project 80s, the movement to reform downtown Anchorage, is taking root.

== Photography projects ==
She has produced Pandemic Portraits (2021), an exhibit of portraits by 15 Alaskan photographers and accompanied by the written and QR-coded audio stories of 16 Alaskan women who were hit with a cancer diagnosis, treatment and/or the aftermath in times of COVID-19.

== Other work ==
In addition to documentary work, Katzke has written a number of short stories, essays and feature-film screenplays, and has been a periodic contributor of opinion pieces to the Anchorage Daily News. She published her first novel, One Good Man: Sex and Murder on the Last Frontier, in 2020.

I Will Fight Until I Melt, 2020, a feature-length screenplay by Katzke, tells the true story of Annie Alowa of St. Lawrence Island, Alaska, fighting for restitution for toxic military waste left on her people's traditional hunting grounds during WWII.

A Monkey's Tale is a 2015 nonfiction travel/adventure book Katzke co-authored with Thillman Wallace about his 3,200 mile journey from Australia to Alaska with his pet monkey.

Linger Where You Land, Birdman, a screenplay by Katzke and finalist for the Sundance Feature Project, tells the story of a US Air Force wife and her belief in UFOs.

In an interview with Sandy Harper of Cyrano's Theatre (now Out North) Katzke said her approach was influenced by having viewed a Broadway production of The Exonerated: "[S]he was particularly intrigued by the way actors-as-prisoners told their stories in monologue fashion, sitting on stools at the edge of a stage reading scripts perched on top of music stands."

Dancing for the Hunter debuted at the 2005 Last Frontier Theatre Conference in Valdez, and was noted in Backstage magazine. Of a later reading in Anchorage, Kristina Church, a critic for the Anchorage Daily News wrote, "Her portraits of four lost souls who wander into the demimonde of strip clubs and prostitution have an authentic feel, as if they're backed up by hours and hours of interviews with dancers and call girls who lived through the Hansen era."

Katzke twice optioned a 1988 movie script about the killings and used it as part of her application for graduate film school, but the production has never been made into a movie. "Serial killer stories were out of fashion", she told the Anchorage Daily News in 2005. On a side note, Alaskan actor Ron Holmstrom cited his role in Katzke's play as helping him attain a role in the 2013 Nicolas Cage film The Frozen Ground, a movie thriller also based on the Hansen story.

== Publications ==
In 2015, she co-authored with Thillman Wallace and published a book, A Monkey's Tale, a non-fiction travel-adventure book about Wallace's 3,200 miles journey from Australia to Alaska with his pet monkey.

Then, in 2020, she published her first novel, One Good Man: Sex and Murder on the Last Frontier.

== Filmography ==
Year	Title	Theme	Notes	Ref
2021	Justice for Harriet	Sexual assault and domestic violence	Part of Silent No More series	
2021	Not So Swell: Living with Lymphedema	Health	short documentary	
2019	And Now We Rise	Displaced people	Biography of a young Athabascan hip-hop artist	
2017	Partners in Healing	Health	An introduction to integrative medicine	
2017	In a Nanosecond	Health	Documentary addressing brain injury awareness	
2016	Fourteen	Children/Growing Up		
2015	Speaking from the Heart	Resilience		
2015	Backing Out of Time	Health		
2013	World School: A Single Journey Can Change the Course of a Life	Personal/Travel		
2011	Day in Our Bay: Voices & Views from Bristol Bay	Indigenous Alaskans		
2010	Survive and Thrive	Health	Video resource for women facing a breast cancer diagnosis and treatment	
2009	About Face: The Story of Gwendellin Bradshaw	Resilience	Feature-length documentary	
2007	The Quiet War	Health	Won 1st place in Best Documentary at California's Reel Women International Film Festival March 2007	
2007	The Gift	Children/Growing Up	A video short	
2003	Inheritance	Children/Growing Up	Short film	
2003	Beyond Flowers: What to Say and Do When Someone You Know Has Breast Cancer	Health	Documentary for newly diagnosed breast cancer patients	
1998	Between Us: A First Aid Kit for Your Heart and Soul	Health	Documentary for newly diagnosed cancer patients	
1990	Sea of Oil	Environmental issues	Social and emotional impact of the Exxon Valdez Oil Spill	
1987	Crescendo	Sexual assault and domestic violence	Addresses domestic violence	
1981	No Word for Rape	Sexual assault and domestic violence	Addressing sexual assault in urban and rural Alaska	

== Controversies ==
Two mentions of controversy have appeared in news coverage of Katzke's films:

Katzke's 1990 film Sea of Oil, which documented the human impact of the Exxon Valdez Oil Spill on the community of Valdez, Alaska, almost didn't make it out of the state, after Exxon wrote the mayor to warn the film would tarnish the community's reputation. This effort, however, failed to prevent the film from being seen more widely, and in July 1991, Sea of Oil was featured as part of a 2-hour nationwide PBS "POV Showcase" special on the environment.

Fourth Avenue, produced in 1985, examined the impacts of a downtown beautification project on Anchorage's unhoused people on the streets. "We upset a number of people with that film," Katzke told an interviewer several years later. "The Native people felt that by showing passed-out drunk Native people we were racist, and we had slandered their culture in some way. The city officials felt that we had been unduly biased and sympathetic toward the Native people. And so we got it from both sides, which made me think that we must have done a fair job."

== Honors and awards ==
Katzke's notable awards and honors include:

- 2021 Best Podcast from the National Federation of Press Women for Anna’s Story, produced by Katzke, hosted by Alice Qannik Glenn of Coffee & Quaq, which tells the story of an Alaska Native woman's long quest for justice after a brutal assault.
- YWCA Alaska/BP, 2018, Woman of Achievement
- 2004 Recipient of In the Rasmuson Foundation's Individual Artist awards.
- 2018 Recognized with a fellowship for as a Foundation press release. Katzke was one of the first recipients of the Rasmuson Foundation's Individual Artist awards in 2004. She was recognized again in 2018 with an $18,000 fellowship for, as a Foundation press release put it, her "multimedia storytelling project using environmental portrait photography, videos, social media and live presentations to document and share grassroots youth movements."
- 2017 Alaska Literary Award from the Alaska Arts & Culture Foundation
- 2005 nomination to the Athena Society
- 2011 Governor's North Star Award for International Excellence in cultural exchange, awarded to businesses and organizations that contribute significantly to Alaska's trade, investment and international relations.
- 2002 Winner of the WinFemme Screenwriting Festival for Legacy, for a love story between a breast cancer patient and her psychologist.
- 1996 Winner of the Minnesota Blockbuster McKnight Film Fund Competition; one of four recipients to split $75,000 in prize money.
- 1990 Winner of the Tokuma Japan International Screenwriting Competition for Pen Pals, which was about a man having a midlife crisis who turns to the personal ads for love, only to be led on a wild goose chase rampant with deception.
