= Logan Leistikow =

American filmmaker (born 1984)

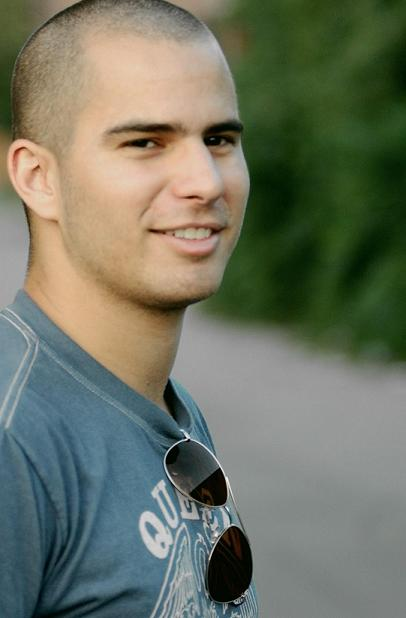
- Born: February 25, 1984 (age 42); Nacogdoches, Texas, U.S.
- Occupations: Film director; producer
- Known for: The Comedy Garage
- Website: loganleistikow.com

Logan Leistikow (born February 25, 1984, in Nacogdoches, Texas) is an American filmmaker known for his documentary, The Comedy Garage. Leistikow also produced and directed Tom Green Live and several behind-the-scenes videos and promos for NBC.

== Early short films ==
In August 2006, Leistikow was "Featured Director" on the second episode of IFC's show Media Lab Uploaded. The program consisted of an interview with Leistikow interspersed with footage from his short video works of the time (the Bittersweet music video, Michael Jordan's Phobia Clinic), followed by his viral video, Mostache Montage, in full.

Leistikow has composed music for many of his own films, as well as other films and even video games. His now defunct "Public Music Project" had become a valuable resource for artists looking for quality royalty-free music.

In the autumn of 2006, Reader's Digest and The Little River Zoo commissioned Leistikow to film the world's only painting capuchin monkey, Bailey. The resulting video was featured on their website and was linked to from the November 2006 print issue of Reader's Digest.

== Tom Green Live ==
Leistikow produced and directed comedian Tom Green's live internet talk show, Tom Green Live, during the spring and summer months of 2007. He was rarely seen on-camera, but Tom would often talk to Logan during the show.

On the July 26, 2007, episode LA Ink's Kat Von D suggested that Tom give her a tattoo live on air. She'd brought her own equipment for the process and after deliberating for several minutes, Tom agreed to tattoo "Logan" on her arm. This was Logan's last week working at the show.

== The Yellow Mic ==
The Yellow Mic is a syndicated series of short-form man-on-the-street videos produced and hosted by Logan Leistikow. The series trademark is a hand-held microphone with a yellow windscreen that always makes an appearance. The videos range from mindless humor to entertainment news and interviews; labeled "guerilla variety" by Leistikow.

A notable episode of The Yellow Mic is "WGA Strike 2007" wherein Leistikow and Feigh interview WGA writers such as Chuck Lorre (Dharma & Greg, Two and a Half Men), and Joe Medieros (The Tonight Show with Jay Leno) picketing outside of NBC Studios in Burbank, California. Actors Jon Cryer (Two and a Half Men) and Erin Tietsort (Sunset Tan) have also made guest appearances on The Yellow Mic.

The show highlights awkward silences and pregnant pauses. A red carpet episode entitled "Streamy Awards 2009" opened with an awkward exchange involving Lisa Kudro and Yellow Mic correspondent Corbin Ross. The 'pilot' episode was in fact a video of Leistikow attempting to flirt with reality TV star Erin Tietsort and ending up interviewing a local homeless woman.

== NBC.com ==
From 2010 to 2011 Leistikow worked at NBC.com as a video producer and editor. He worked on several behind-the-scenes and promotional projects for NBC shows Last Comic Standing, The Apprentice, Parenthood, Days of Our Lives, Minute to Win It, and The Marriage Ref, among others.

== The Comedy Garage ==
In March 2011 Leistikow's first feature documentary, The Comedy Garage, was picked up by distributor indieflix. After a short festival run and a theatrical premiere in Los Angeles on May 3, the film was rereleased on Prime and Hulu on August 6, 2011.
