= The Comedy Garage =

- Directed by: Logan Leistikow
- Edited by: Logan Leistikow
- Music by: Wax
- Production company: Documentary Label
- Distributed by: IndieFlix
- Release date: March 15, 2011
- Running time: 50 minutes
- Country: United States
- Language: English

The Comedy Garage is a documentary by director Logan Leistikow, released in 2011, depicting a day in the life of five rising star comedians who produce a stand-up comedy show performed on a self-made stage in their garage in Burbank, California. Shot cinéma vérité style, the film highlights the unique personalities and techniques of comics Cornell Reid, Matthew Sullivan, Sean Green, Paul Danke, and Casey Feigh.

The Comedy Garage had been a staple of the Los Angeles comedy scene before filming began. Leistikow met the comedians while working at Tom Green Live. Once he was invited to a comedy garage show, he got inspired and soon began production on the documentary.
