= Josh Koury =

American filmmaker (born 1977)

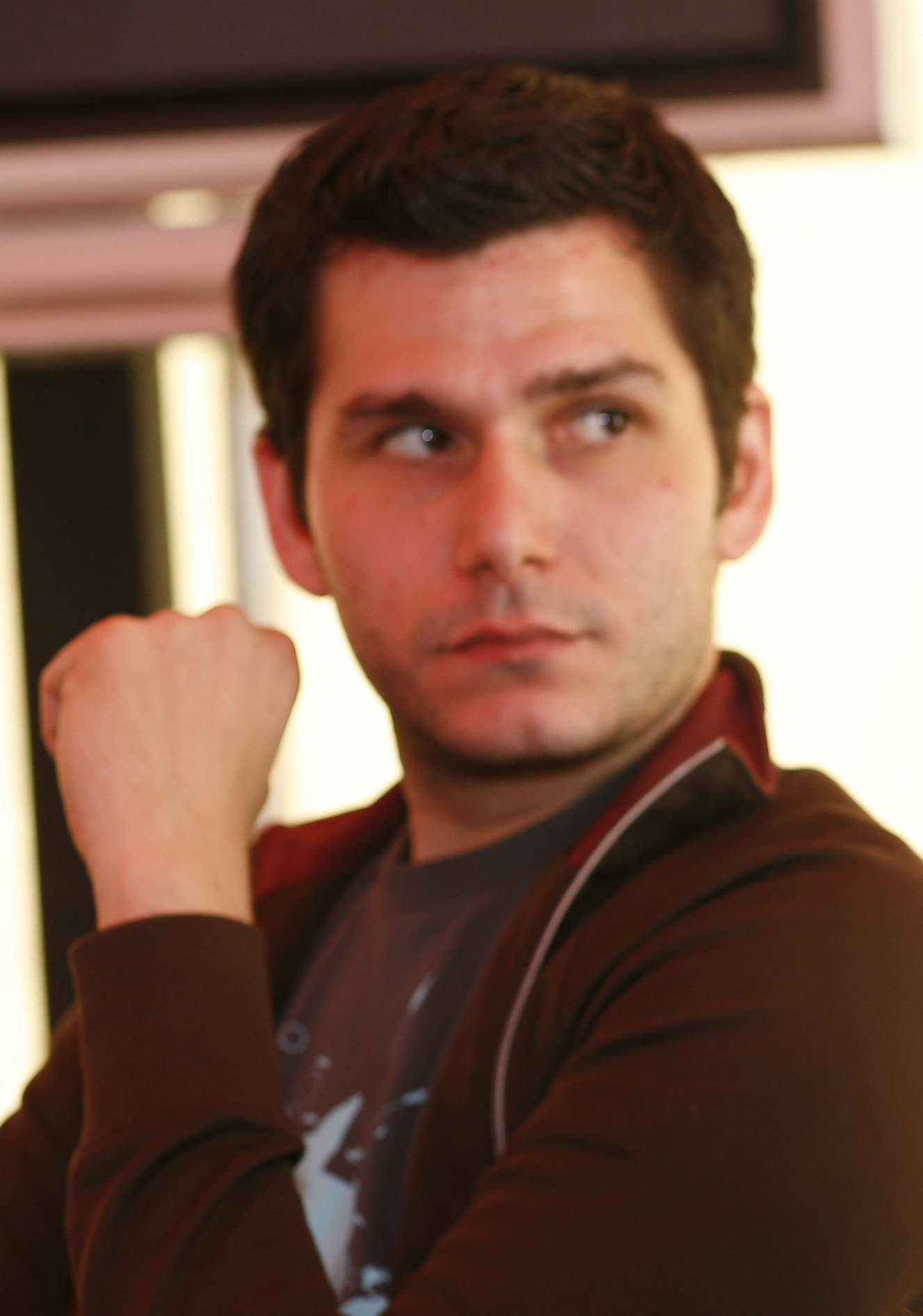
- Born: April 22, 1977 (age 48); New York, New York, U.S.
- Occupations: Director, Editor, Cinematographer
- Years active: 2002–present
- Website: brooklynunderground.org

Josh Koury (born April 22, 1977) is an American filmmaker, best known for his documentary films Voyeur, Journey to Planet X, We Are Wizards and Standing by Yourself.

Koury was born in Central New York, and currently resides in Greenpoint, Brooklyn.

His first film, Standing by Yourself, opened theatrically in 2002. His second feature-length film, We Are Wizards, had its premiere at SXSW in March 2008. Since then it has traveled to many film festivals around the world and had its theatrical release in November 2008. His feature film, Journey to Planet X, had its World premiere at the 2012 Tribeca Film Festival and was picked up as an Epix Original Documentary to air in 2013. Voyeur, starring Gay Talese and Gerald Foos, was globally premiered as a Netflix Original documentary film in December 2017.

With Myles Kane and Cris Moris, Koury also co-founded the Brooklyn Underground Film Festival, where he served as programming director for five years. In addition, he worked for four years from 2004 at the Hamptons International Film Festival as a programmer. He now works as faculty at the Fashion Institute of Technology, Manhattan, New York.
