= Cry Freetown =

- Directed by: Sorious Samura
- Production company: Insight News TV
- Distributed by: CNN International
- Release date: February 3, 2000
- Country: Sierra Leone

Cry Freetown is a 2000 documentary film directed by Sorious Samura. It is an account of the victims of the Sierra Leone Civil War and depicts the most brutal period with the Revolutionary United Front (RUF) rebels capturing the capital city (January 1999). The film also documents the Nigerian army summarily executing suspects. It was broadcast on CNN International on February 3, 2000. The film was produced with the assistance of CNN Productions, the Dutch news program 2Vandaag and Insight News Television. Awards for the film include the Emmy Award, BAFTA Award, Peabody Award and the 2001 silver award at the Alfred I. duPont–Columbia University Awards.
