= Aryana Farshad =

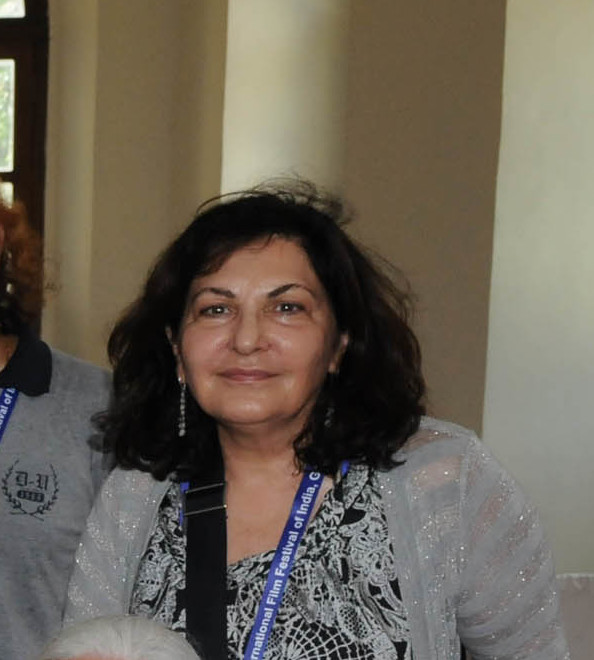

Aryana Farshad is a screenwriter, film director, and film producer born in Tehran, Iran.

Known for her documentary films on spirituality and mysticism, Farshad is an international film maker. She has been commissioned to make several films for different non-profit foundations in the US, Iran, London, Turkey and India. Fluent in English, French & Persian, Farshad is the recipient of "Audience Favorite Award", "Telly Award", and "Davey Award". In addition, she received the ABU Award for editing a documentary film entitled "Immigrant Birds". Farshad is a still photographer and her work was exhibited at LACMA, and Einsen Gallery. Previously, Farshad worked at COLUMBIA and MGM.

Currently, Farshad lectures at major universities, museums, and various non-profit organizations. She has lectured at: The British Museum of Arts, LA County Museum of Arts, UC Berkeley, Stanford University, Fes Sacred Music Festival in Morocco, Parliament of the World Religions in Barcelona, and the Gene Siskel Film Center in Chicago. For her latest project "Longing for the Soul; A Quest for Rumi", she received a "Bijan & Soraya" Grant. Filmed entirely in US, Iran, Turkey & Afghanistan.

== Education and career ==
She moved to Paris and studied French language and literature at The Sorbonne, prior to receiving her degree from the Institut Des Hautes Etudes Cinematographiques in film production and editing. She returned to her native country of Iran for a few years where she worked with Iranian and western film makers.

She moved to Los Angeles, attending USC film department and later joined the Editor's Guild and worked for Hollywood studios, including MGM Studios and Columbia Pictures in television post-production. In 2000, she travelled back to her native country Iran and returned footage which was used in creating the documentary film Mystic Iran, the Unseen World. Her second documentary film on Iran, Age of Awakening, is narrated by Omid Djalili. Mystic Iran won the "Audience Favorite Award" at the 2008 Noor Film Festival. Her current project, Longing for the Soul is about Rumi and in production.

== Filmography ==
- Age of Awakening, narrated by Omid Djalili.
- Cesar winning French actress Fanny Ardent.
- Mystic Iran is narrated by Academy Award nominee Shohreh Aghdashloo, and
- 1997 "Lymphoma Foundation"- by Women in Film.
- 2001 "Title protected"; Full hour documentary film shot entirely in Iran.
- 2003–2005 Age of Awakening"; Premiered at British Museum followed by LACMA along with several screenings at various universities throughout the United States.
- 2003 "Encyclopedia Iranica"; Short Corporate Film.
- 2000–2002 "Mystic Iran" (2002): Full hour documentary film shot entirely in Iran. World premiere broadcast on US PBS Channels as well as 500+ international television channels. Kevin Thomas at Los Angeles Times: "An exemplary documentary...beautiful, stirring film", Mare Mazer at KCET: "A stunning look at a culture few westerners understand.
- 2006–2007 "Myths & Kings"; Unfinished project.
- 2007 "A Time to Reconcile". Parker Media.
- 2010–2012 "Title protected". Full hour documentary film; Commissioned by “ Hady, LLC".
- 2012 Short documentary film; Commissioned by "Arasteh Foundation".
- 2013 40 minute documentary film on "Spirit of India" (currently in post.)
- 2013-2015 "Longing for the Soul"- Feature-length documentary film based on the legacy of Persian mystic poet, RUMI. The Project received partial funding from the "Bijan & Soraya" Grant.

== Awards ==
- April 2008 Audience Choice Award for Mystic Iran at Noor Iranian Film Festival
- May 2008 Telly award for directing and editing short film.'

== General references ==
- Iran Heritage Foundation
- OCPC Magazine (December 2007) Cover story: Aryana Farshad – Her journey through the 'unseen world'.
- LACMA, Mystic Iran, The Unseen World to screen at the Los Angeles County Museum of Art

"PSA Poetry group will have a screening of the much anticipated documentary by Aryana Farshad called "Mystic Iran, The Unseen World"

- Spirituality & Practice, Film Review By Frederic and Mary Ann Brussat
- Mazalien, Mystic Iran – The Unseen World
- Asia Society, Mystic Iran: The Unseen World
- Noor Film Festival screening of Mystic Iran
