= Lesley Chilcott =

American film producer and director

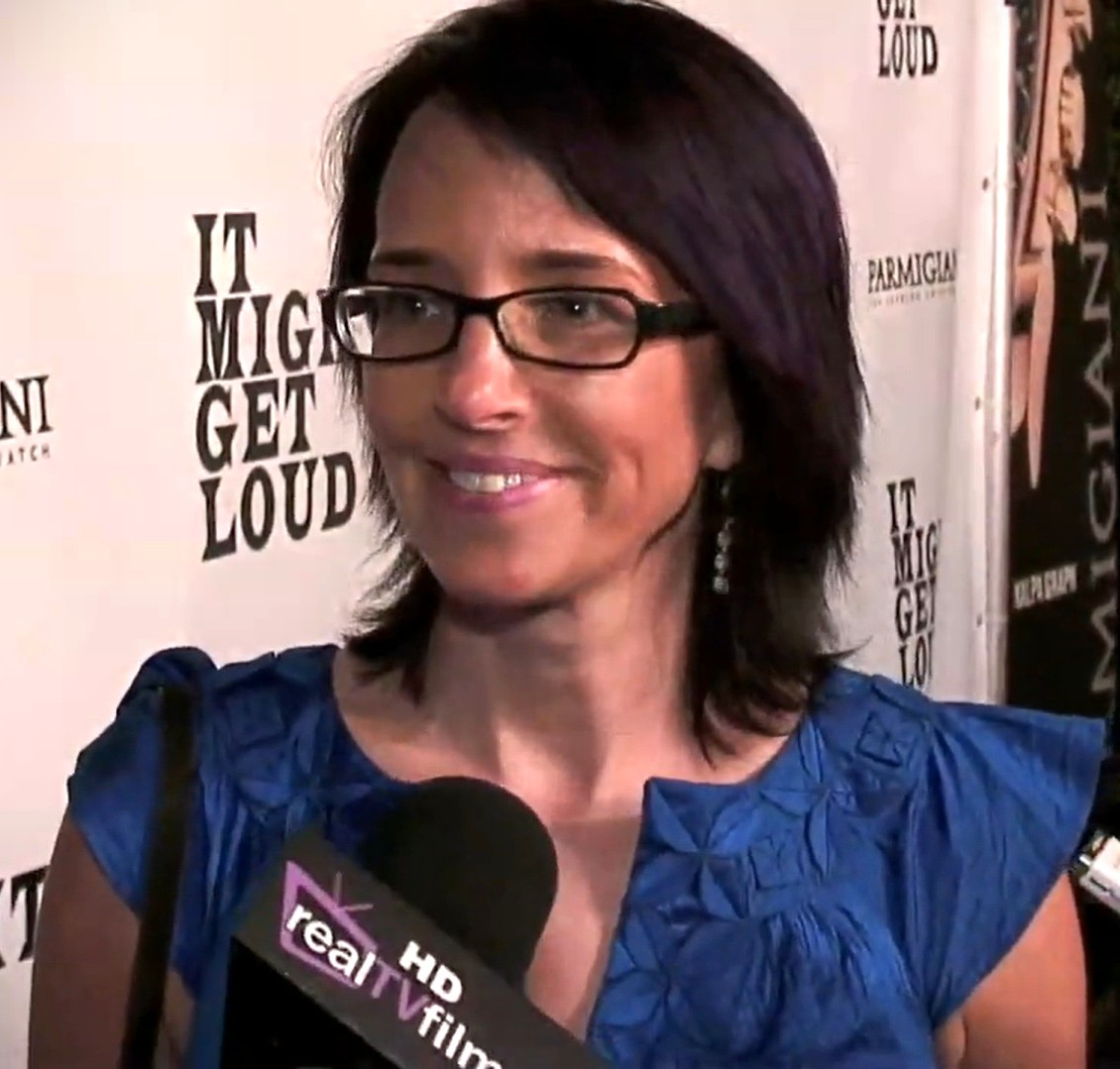
- Chilcott in 2009
- Occupations: Film producer, Film director
- Years active: 2003 - Current
- Notable work: An Inconvenient Truth, Watson, Arnold
- Website: http://www.lesleychilcott.com/

Lesley Chilcott is an American filmmaker known for her work addressing social and environmental justice, education, gender equality, and pop culture phenomena. In 2019, she directed Watson, an action-adventure documentary about Sea Shepherd founder and eco-activist Paul Watson and his lifelong mission to save the oceans, which the Los Angeles Times described as “excellent and urgent,” adding that the “riveting documentary should be required viewing for all.”

Chilcott produced the Academy Award–winning An Inconvenient Truth (2006), a critical and commercial success that earned the Academy Award for Best Documentary Feature and the Academy Award for Best Original Song.

== Life and career ==
Chilcott was born in Bellflower, California, and developed a love for the outdoors during family trips to the Colorado River. She earned a Bachelor of Science degree from the University of Southern California and has credited both her appreciation for nature and the 1988 documentary Cane Toads: An Unnatural History with inspiring her career in filmmaking. “When I saw Cane Toads, I realized this was a different genre than I’d been led to believe,” she told Produced By magazine. “Not only is this hilarious, but it’s pure craziness… and I thought, That’s what I want to do.”

Chilcott was selected as a 2025 Bellagio Center resident by the Rockefeller Foundation. She is scheduled to spend November 2025 in Italy as part of the residency, joining 13 international leaders working on solutions to major climate change challenges.

As a director, Chilcott’s films include Watson (2019), which won the Zelda Penzel Giving Voice to the Voiceless Award at the Hamptons International Film Festival and Best Feature Film at the International Wildlife Film Festival; documentary A Small Section of the World (2014); and documentary CodeGirl (2015), the first feature film to premiere exclusively on YouTube before moving to theaters. Selected for the American Film Showcase, the documentary follows an annual competition in which teenage girls from around the world design an app to solve a problem in their community. Her television work includes Netflix’s three-part docuseries Arnold (2023), which examines the life and career of Governor Arnold Schwarzenegger, and the six-part MGM+ series Helter Skelter: An American Myth (2020), which explored the decades-long cultural fascination with Charles Manson.

Chilcott’s directing is marked by immersive storytelling that blends journalistic depth with a strong cinematic style. Writing about Helter Skelter: An American Myth, San Francisco Chronicle critic Mick LaSalle noted that she “visually and sonically … locks us in this 1969 world,” using archival broadcasts, period footage, and ambient sound in place of narration, and called the series “artful and extraordinary… documentary filmmaking at its best.”

Similarly, Kate Walsh of the Los Angeles Times, reviewing Watson (2019), described its “fierce, urgent” tone and its ability to immerse audiences in the activist’s struggle, highlighting Chilcott’s use of her subjects’ voices and intense visuals to create a sense of immediacy. This approach—allowing characters to speak for themselves while anchoring stories in rigorous research—has become a hallmark of her filmmaking.

Chilcott served as executive producer of Hulu’s three-part series Mastermind: To Think Like a Killer (2024), about Dr. Ann Burgess, the architect of the FBI’s “mindhunter” method, which earned a 2025 News & Documentary Emmy nomination for Outstanding Crime and Justice Documentary. She also executive produced the four-part series Amityville: An Origin Story (2023) for MGM+.

Chilcott produced the education documentary Waiting for "Superman" (2010), which earned her the Producers Guild of America Award for Outstanding Producer of Documentary Theatrical Motion Pictures. Her other producing credits include the Academy Award–winning An Inconvenient Truth (2006); the cult rock documentary It Might Get Loud (2008), which profiles guitarists The Edge, Jimmy Page, and Jack White; and An Inconvenient Sequel: Truth to Power (2017), which continued former Vice President Al Gore’s campaign to address climate change. Her films have screened at major festivals including the Sundance, Cannes, Toronto, and Berlin film festivals.

She is currently directing Howling, a documentary examining the clash between old and new ideals in the American West through the lens of one of its most misunderstood animals: the wolf.

== Filmography ==
Feature Films:

- An Inconvenient Truth (2006)
- It Might Get Loud (2008)
- Waiting for “Superman” (2010)
- Gahan Wilson: Born Dead, Still Weird (2013)
- A Small Section of the World (2014)
- CodeGirl (2015)
- An Inconvenient Sequel: Truth to Power (2017)
- Maxima (2019)
- Watson (2019)
- Howling (Status: In Production)

Television Series:

- Helter Skelter: An American Myth (2020)
- Amityville: An Origin Story (2022)
- Arnold (2023)
- Mastermind (2024)
