= The Chinese Lives of Uli Sigg =

- Directed by: Michael Schindhelm
- Produced by: Marcel Hoehn
- Starring: Uli Sigg Ai Weiwei; Cao Chong’en; Cao Fei; Pierre de Meuron; Hans-Peter Fallegger; Fang Lijun; Feng Mengbo; Marianne Heller; Hu Xiaoyuan; Jacques Herzog; Lang Lang; Anna Liu; Victoria Lu; Alexandra Munroe; Lars Nittve; Hans Ulrich Obrist; Qiu Xiaofei; Erwin Schurtenberger; Shao Fan; Rita Sigg; Marc Spiegler; Wang Guangyi; Xiao Li; Max Zellweger Zeng Fanzhi
- Cinematography: Filip Zumbrunn
- Edited by: Marina Wernli
- Music by: Feng Mengbo, Peter Bräker
- Release date: 18 February 2016
- Running time: 93 minutes
- Countries: Mauensee, Basel, Hamburg, Berlin, Peking, Guangzhou, Hong Kong, Tianjin

The Chinese Lives of Uli Sigg is a documentary by the filmmaker Michael Schindhelm, released in 2016. At its opening in 2019, the M+ museum for visual culture in Hong Kong will present 1500 art works by contemporary Chinese Artist to the public. The collection is credited the most important of its kind worldwide. The documentary The Chinese Lives of Uli Sigg portrays Uli Sigg's involvement in one of the first economic projects that introduced China's opening toward the West and his following support of the Chinese art scene. His work as an art collector led to the donation of his collection to the M+ museum.

== Plot ==
Starting with the development of the first joint venture between a Western company and China, initiated by the Schindler Group, the documentary traces the relationship between Uli Sigg and the Chinese society art throughout his careers. Further steps were his appointment as the Swiss ambassador in Beijing, his return to Switzerland and his latest cooperation with the M+ museum in Hong Kong. The connection between Sigg and the transformations of the Chinese art scene are depicted by its protagonist, namely Wang Guangyi, Fang Lijun and Ai Weiwei – alongside Uli Sigg he has already been part of the documentary Bird's Nest – Herzog & de Meuron in China, directed by Michael Schindhelm and Christoph Schaub. Alongside archival material the protagonist provide an insight to the ongoing complex relationship between state and art.

== Release ==
The Chinese Lives of Uli Sigg premiered on February 16, 2016, at Kino Rex in Bern. The premiere in Asia took place on 21 March in Hong Kong. The documentary participated at many international film festivals, including the 69° Festival del film Locarno, 35th Vancouver International Film Festival, Lo schermo dell’arte Film Festival in Florence, Festival do Rio, and the Art Film Festival in Beirut. From January 19 – 26, The Chinese Lives of Uli Sigg was part of the 52nd Solothurn Film Festival.

== Reception ==
"Despite it all, China's contemporary scene took off like a rocket in the years after Mao's death. Often working underground, the artists were radical, and when Swiss businessman Uli Sigg first went to China in 1979, he hesitated to make contact for fear of getting the artists in trouble with the authorities. That's one of many intriguing details revealed by Michael Schindhelm about the collector' life, showing in Art Basel Hong Kong's film section."
Jan Dalley: "Medici prince of China", Financial Times, March 2016
