= Arnold (TV series) =

American TV series

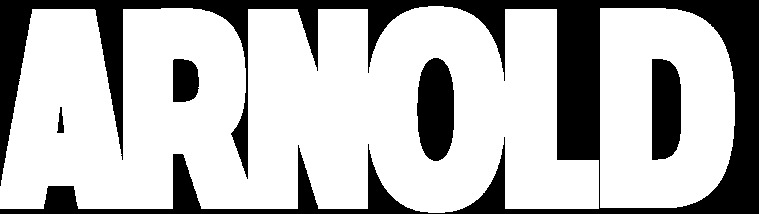
- Title logo
- Genre: Docuseries
- Created by: Lesley Chilcott; Allen Hughes
- Directed by: Lesley Chilcott
- Composers: Christophe Beck; Matthew Feder
- Country of origin: United States
- Original languages: English; German
- No. of episodes: 3

Production
- Executive producers: Lesley Chilcott; Allen Hughes; Peter Nelson; Doug Pray
- Producer: Craig Repass
- Cinematography: Logan Schneider
- Editors: Steve Prestemon; Poppy Das; Travis Smith-Evans
- Production companies: Defiant Ones Media Group; Invented By Girls

Original release
- Network: Netflix
- Release: June 7, 2023

Arnold is an American docuseries produced by Netflix. The series explores the life and career of Arnold Schwarzenegger, one of the most iconic figures in the world of bodybuilding, Hollywood, and politics.

== Overview ==
Arnold delves closely into the life and career of Arnold Schwarzenegger, chronicling his rise to stardom, achievements in bodybuilding, successful acting career, and transition into the world of politics. The series presents an in-depth look to the man behind the larger-than-life persona, providing viewers with a comprehensive understanding of his multifaceted life.

== Episodes ==
No.	Title	Directed by	Original release date
1	"Part 1: Athlete"	Lesley Chilcott	June 7, 2023
Arnold revisits his upbringing in post-war Austria, the moment that sparked his seismic rise to bodybuilding fame and his pursuit of the American dream.
2	"Part 2: Actor"	Lesley Chilcott	June 7, 2023
Focused on turning obstacles into assets, Arnold traces his road to Hollywood stardom and reflects on his roles, rivals and real-life love story.
3	"Part 3: American"	Lesley Chilcott	June 7, 2023
Amid media scrutiny, scandal and marital strife, Arnold pivots to political reform during his ambitious eight-year tenure as governor of California.

== Production ==
The series was produced by Allen Hughes' Defiant Ones Media Group and director Lesley Chilcott's Invented By Girls. For the documentary, Chilcott talked with Schwarzenegger on FaceTime three or four times in a week for a year-and-a-half and later recorded over forty hours of interview with him. She also stated that Arnold had no editorial oversight and no topic was prohibited from being discussed. Chilcott was only able to cover the era of his governorship for half an hour and wanted to make another episode about it, but her request was rejected.

== Release ==
Netflix announced the documentary series based on the life of Schwarzenegger on May 10, 2023, and stated that it would be released in three parts. It also released a trailer to accompany the announcement. The series was released on June 7, 2023.

== Reception ==
On the review aggregator website Rotten Tomatoes, 70% of 27 critics' reviews are positive. The website's consensus reads: "If Arnold is too acquiescing to fully grapple with Schwarzenegger's complex legacy, the basic facts of his life are fascinating enough to make for a thoroughly entertaining documentary."
