= The Pixar Story =

- Directed by: Leslie Iwerks
- Written by: Leslie Iwerks
- Produced by: Leslie Iwerks
- Starring: John Lasseter; Brad Bird; Ed Catmull; Steve Jobs; George Lucas
- Narrated by: Stacy Keach
- Cinematography: Suki Medencevic
- Edited by: Leslie Iwerks; Stephen Myers
- Music by: Jeff Beal
- Production company: Leslie Iwerks Productions
- Distributed by: Buena Vista Pictures Distribution
- Release date: August 28, 2007
- Running time: 87 minutes
- Language: English

The Pixar Story is a 2007 documentary film directed by Leslie Iwerks, about the history of Pixar Animation Studios. An early version of the film premiered at the Sonoma Film Festival in 2007, and it had a limited theatrical run later that year before it was picked up by the Starz cable network in the United States.

The film was released, outside North America, on DVD in summer 2008 as part of the "Ultimate Pixar Collection", a box set of Pixar films. It was then included as a special feature on the WALL-E special edition DVD and Blu-ray releases, which were launched on November 18, 2008, and again on its Criterion edition.

The film premiered on BBC Two in the United Kingdom.

== Synopsis ==
The success story of Pixar Animation Studios from the ground up.

== Cast ==
- Steve Jobs – Principal Investor & co-founder of Pixar
- John Lasseter – Pixar co-founder & visionary
- Tim Allen – Actor, voiced Buzz Lightyear
- Brad Bird – Director
- Edwin Catmull – First Chief Technical Officer
- Billy Crystal – Actor, voiced Mike in Monsters, Inc. and Monsters University
- Michael Eisner – Former CEO of The Walt Disney Company
- Tom Hanks – Actor, voiced Sheriff Woody
- Bob Iger – CEO of The Walt Disney Company
- George Lucas – Founder of Lucasfilm, Pixar's original foundation
- James Ford Murphy – Head of animation & director of Lava
- Diane Disney Miller – Daughter of Walt Disney and wife of former Disney CEO Ron Miller
- Marc Davis – animator
- Stacy Keach – Narrator

== Reception ==
The film was given generally positive reviews, receiving an aggregated score of 86% from Rotten Tomatoes, based on seven reviews.

== See also ==
- Waking Sleeping Beauty, a 2009 documentary film chronicling the history of Walt Disney Animation Studios.
