= Recycled Life =

2006 film

- Directed by: Leslie Iwerks
- Written by: Mike Glad; Leslie Iwerks
- Produced by: Michael Fey; Mike Glad; Leslie Iwerks
- Narrated by: Edward James Olmos
- Cinematography: Leslie Iwerks
- Edited by: Leslie Iwerks
- Music by: Mader
- Release date: 2006
- Running time: 38 minutes
- Country: United States
- Language: English

Recycled Life is a 2006 American short documentary film directed by Leslie Iwerks. It relays the story of a massive toxic landfill near Guatemala City, and the local residents who scavenge there to eke out their meager living.

== Recognition ==
It was nominated for an Academy Award for Best Documentary Short.

== Film Festival Appearances ==
According to IWERKS&CO.

- Best Documentary Short Human Rights Night Bologna, Italy
- Best Documentary Short Tahoe/Reno International Film Festival
- Best Documentary Short Newport Beach International Film Festival
- Best Documentary Short San Luis Obispo International Film Festival
- Best Documentary Short Ojai International Film Festival
- Best Documentary Short Mendocino International Film Festival
- Official Selection SXSW Film Festival
- Official Selection Calgary Underground Film Festival

== Reception ==
Rocky Mountain Women's Film wrote: "[t]hrough this compelling story, the filmmakers have captured the beauty, humor and remarkable contrast that resonate throughout the vast wasteland of garbage."
