= Myles Kane =

American musician and film producer

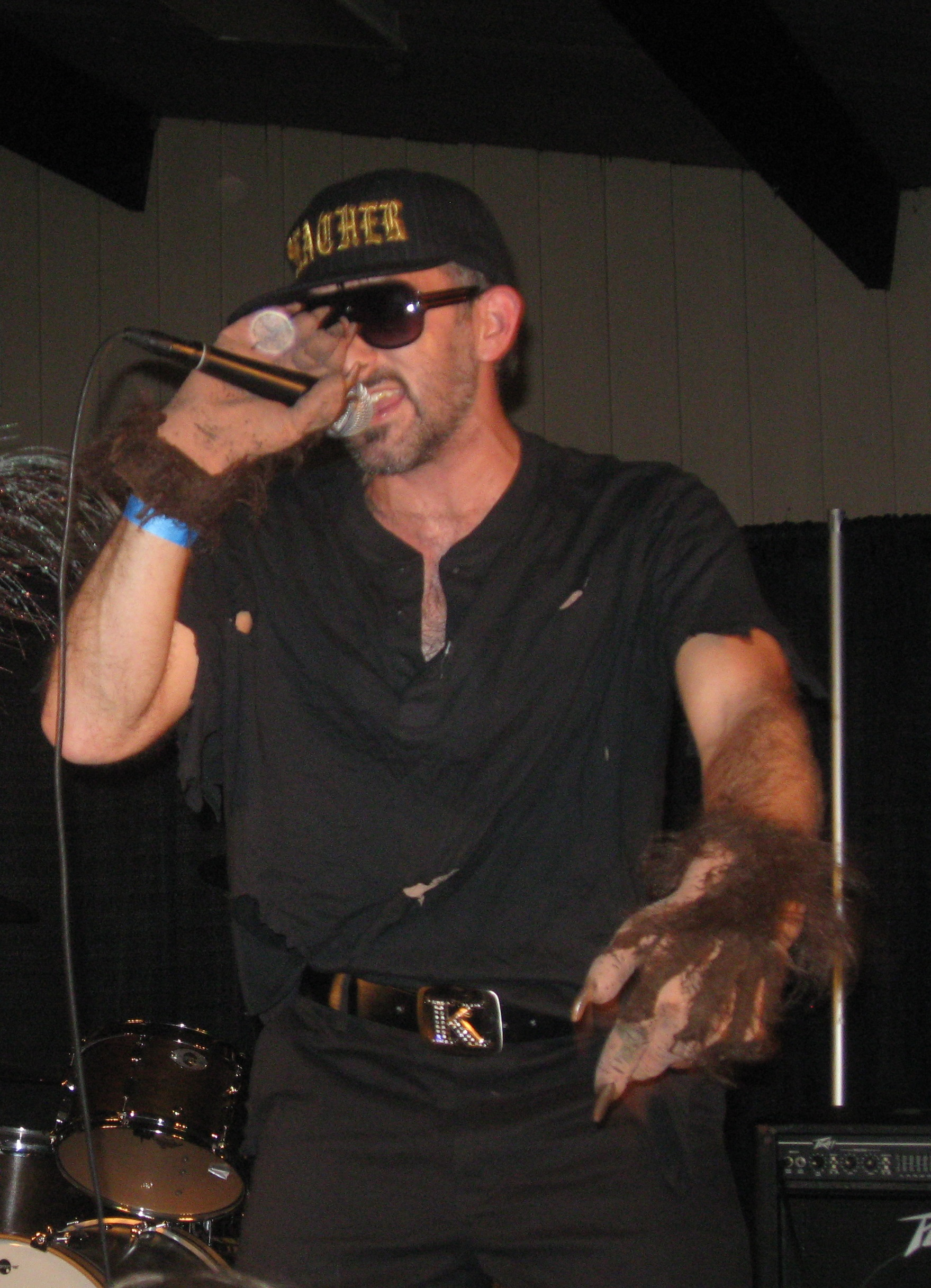
- Myles Kane performing as "MC Kreacher" at Wrockstock IV.
- Other name: MC Kreacher
- Occupation: Film Producer

Myles Kane (born 1979) is an American film producer and wizard rock artist (performing under the name MC Kreacher).

== Film ==
He received a Bachelor of Fine Arts in Film from the Pratt Institute in 2001.

In 2002 he co-founded the Brooklyn Underground Film Festival with Josh Koury and Cris Moris. After that, he worked at The New Yorker and, along with Kristina Budelis, produced and directed some of the magazine's first video series and documentaries.

He was the editor for We Are Wizards, a documentary about the Harry Potter fandom released in 2008 and the co-director of Voyeur, a Netflix film about journalism icon Gay Talese.

== Wizard Rock ==
He became involved with wizard rock after working on the documentary We Are Wizards about the Harry Potter fandom. Previously, he had never even read any of the books. Under the stage name Mc Kreacher he released one album, Alone in the Dark, in 2009.

He always performs wearing rubber monster gloves.

He has been described as "the perfect gangsta wiz-hopper; he’s got so much attitude" by Paul DeGeorge of Harry and the Potters.

== Personal ==
Kane was diagnosed with primary sclerosing cholangitis in 2006. In 2013 he required a liver transplant. To pay the deductible on his medical insurance, a fundraiser for $50,000 was held and, with the help of his Wrock fans, that goal was exceeded.

He lives in Williamsburg, Brooklyn.
