= List of National Equality March endorsements =

This is a list of prominent individuals and organizations who endorsed the National Equality March.

== Organizations ==
=== National LGBT organizations ===
- Human Rights Campaign
- Gay and Lesbian Alliance Against Defamation (GLAAD)
- Universal Fellowship of Metropolitan Community Churches
- National Gay and Lesbian Task Force
- Gay, Lesbian and Straight Education Network
- BiNet USA
- Immigration Equality
- Parents, Families and Friends of Lesbians and Gays (P-FLAG)

=== Others ===
- Screen Actors Guild
- National Organization for Women
- Unitarian Universalist Association
- Associated Students of Madison Student Council

== Individuals ==
=== Elected officials ===
- US. Senate Majority Leader Harry Reid (D-Nev.)
- U.S. Congresswoman Tammy Baldwin (D-Wisc.)
- Sen. State Senator Tom Duane (D-N.Y.)
- San Francisco Supervisor Bevan Dufty
- Assembly Member Micah Kellner (D-N.Y.)
- Assembly Member Daniel O'Donnell (D-N.Y.)
- New York City Council Speaker Christine Quinn

=== Other political officials ===
- Former U.S. Congressman Ed Feighan
- Former California Sen. Sheila Kuehl
- President and CEO Chuck Wolfe of Victory Fund
- Richard Socarides, adviser under United States President Bill Clinton
- Paul Yandura, former leader of the National Stonewall Democrats

=== LGBT rights leaders ===
- Neil Giuliano
- Cleve Jones
- David Mixner
- Nicole Murray-Ramirez
- Ann Northup
- Judy Shepard
- Nadine Smith
- Sean Strub
- Urvashi Vaid
- Chip Arndt

=== Actors ===
- Annette Bening
- Neve Campbell
- Gavin Creel
- Wilson Cruz
- Alan Cumming
- Dana Delany
- Joely Fisher
- James Franco
- Mariska Hargitay
- Helen Hunt
- Chad Lowe
- Camryn Manheim
- Ewan McGregor
- Ian McKellen
- Julianne Moore
- Kathy Najimy
- Peter Paige
- David Hyde Pierce
- Anthony Rapp
- Meg Ryan
- Hilary Swank
- Jennifer Tilly
- Marisa Tomei
- Charlize Theron
- Judith Light
- Laura Benanti
- Alan Cumming
- Harvey Fierstein
- Celia Keenan-Bolger
- Beth Broderick
- Scott Evans
- Mark Lawson
- Alec Mapa
- Larry Sullivan
- Chad Allen
- David Drake
- Calpernia Addams
- Ann Hampton Callaway
- Holly Near
- Bruce Vilanch

=== Writers, producers, and directors ===
- Greg Berlanti
- Ilene Chaiken
- David Marshall Grant
- Max Mutchnick
- Felice Picano
- Bruce Cohen
- Dan Jinks
- Dustin Lance Black
- Michael Kearns
- Jamie McGonnigal
- Gus Van Sant

=== Radio, literary authors, journalists, and blog writers ===
- David Bender
- Michelangelo Signorile
- Richard Berengarten
- Lane Hudson
- Doug Ireland
- Jonathan Katz
- Eric Marcus
- Andy Towle

=== Others ===
- Scott Fujita, New Orleans Saints linebacker.
- Rabbi Eric Yoffie, President of the Union for Reform Judaism
- Melissa Etheridge
- Dave Koz
- Rev. Troy Perry
- Dr. Tony Mills
- Judge David Young
- Kate Clinton
