= Carts (film) =

2007 film directed by Chris Cashman

- Directed by: Chris Cashman
- Written by: Chris Cashman
- Produced by: Chris Cashman; Lisa Cashman; Jessica Star Judd; Michael Judd
- Starring: Douglas Spain; Ted Lange; Fernanda Romero; Bradford Anderson; Pete Gardner; Marshall Manesh; Martin Klebba; Mo Collins; Warren Stevens; Dennis Hayden
- Cinematography: Darren P. Leis
- Edited by: Joseph Jerman
- Release date: 2007
- Running time: 93 minutes
- Country: United States

Carts is a 2007 satire comedy film written and directed by Chris Cashman. The film stars Douglas Spain, Ted Lange, Fernanda Romero, Bradford Anderson, and Pete Gardner.

== Plot ==
A group of misfit shopping cart attendants deal with another day at their dead end jobs.

== Cast ==
- Douglas Spain as Roberto
- Ted Lange as Ted
- Fernanda Romero as Maria
- Bradford Anderson as Ed
- Pete Gardner as Daniel McCarey
- Marshall Manesh as Fab
- Martin Klebba as Joe
- Mo Collins as Hilda
- Warren Stevens as Fred Tait
- Dennis Hayden as Ted
- Aaron Smolinski as Seth
- Paul H. Kim as Mike
- Sam Sarpong as Conrad
- Douglas Tait as Hubertus
- Isabel Cueva as Lupe
- Angelina Spicer as Angie
- Herman Poppe as Henry Low

== Production ==
Cashman and his wife financed Carts on their credit cards. It was filmed on a JVC GY-HD100U Pro HD camcorder. It was filmed in a Costco parking lot in Burbank, California over 15 days.

== Reception ==
It premiered at The Valley Film Festival where it won the Ten Degrees Hotter Award for Best Feature Film. Film Threat scored it 3.5/5, calling it "a good start" for director Cashman.
