= Beucher =

Beucher is a surname. Notable people with the surname include:

- Magda Beucher (born 1985), Polish soprano and composer
- Molly Beucher, American actress, screenwriter, and film producer
- Terry Beucher (born 1937), American javelin thrower
