= Chris Cashman =

American filmmaker

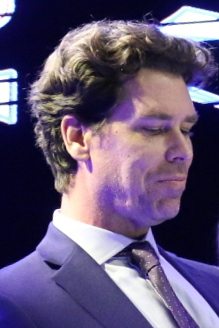
- Cashman in 2019
- Born: February 25, 1975 (age 51)
- Education: St. Augustine High School; Villanova University
- Occupation: Filmmaker
- Spouse: Lisa Cashman (m. 2002)
- Children: 2
- Awards: List of awards

Chris Cashman (born February 25, 1975) is an American film producer, film director, and screenwriter who produced the films Thane of East County (2015), Club Frontera (2016), Undocumented (2016), San Diego's Gay Bar History (2018), To Hell and Gone (2019), and Leave 'Em Laughing (2020).

== Early life ==
Cashman attended St. Augustine High School and graduated in 1993. He received a Bachelor of Arts from Villanova University.

== Career ==
In the mid 2000s, Cashman worked as stuntman and photo double for actor Will Ferrell on the films Wake Up, Ron Burgundy: The Lost Movie, Kicking & Screaming, and Stranger Than Fiction. In 2006, he financed the film Carts with his wife. It was shot by Darren Leis on the GY-HD100U Pro HD camcorder.

Prior to the 2016 United States presidential election, Cashman produced and released the short film Undocumented about immigrant deportations if Donald Trump were elected president. In 2018, he produced San Diego's Gay Bar History, a documentary that looks at the lesser known history of gay bars in San Diego. In 2020, Cashman directed and produced the short film Leave 'Em Laughing which centered on Dick Shawn's final standup performance.

=== Club Frontera ===
In 2016, Cashman wrote, directed, and produced his first feature documentary in Tijuana called Club Frontera, which focused on the Mexican professional football club Xolos. He wanted to improve the city's reputation by shedding light on the culture and community which had been tarnished by corruption and conflict. The film took five years to be distributed, was shortened for television and renamed Xolos: Tijuana’s Team.

== Filmography ==
Feature films
| Year | Title | Producer | Director | Writer | Notes |
|---|---|---|---|---|---|
| 2007 | Carts | Yes | Yes | Yes | |
| 2011 | The Victorville Massacre | Supervising | No | No | |
| 2015 | Thane of East County | Yes | No | No | Also first assistant director |
| 2016 | A Life Lived | Yes | No | No | |
| 2019 | God Incorporated | Co-producer | No | No | Also known as Ism |
| 2019 | To Hell and Gone | Associate | No | No | |
| TBA | Beyond the Break | Yes | Yes | Yes | |

Short films
| Year | Title | Producer | Director | Writer | Ref. |
|---|---|---|---|---|---|
| 2010 | Goofyfoot | Yes | Yes | No | |
| 2011 | Revelations | Yes | Yes | Yes | |
| 2016 | Undocumented | Yes | Yes | Yes | |
| 2020 | Leave 'Em Laughing | Yes | Yes | Yes | |

Documentaries
| Year | Title | Producer | Director | Writer | Ref. |
|---|---|---|---|---|---|
| 2016 | Club Frontera | Yes | Yes | Yes | |
| 2018 | San Diego's Gay Bar History | Yes | No | No | |
| 2022 | Sons of St. Augustine | Yes | Yes | Yes | |

== Accolades ==
| Festival | Year | Award | Title | Result | Ref. |
|---|---|---|---|---|---|
| The Valley Film Festival | 2007 | Best Feature | Carts | Won | |
| The Valley Film Festival | 2010 | Audience Choice: Best Short Drama | Goofyfoot | Won | |
| Chicago Latino Film Festival | 2016 | Audience Choice Feature: Documentary | Club Frontera | Nominated | |
| Downtown Los Angeles Film Festival | 2016 | Best Feature Documentary | Club Frontera | Nominated | |
| San Diego Latino Film Festival | 2016 | Best Feature Documentary | Club Frontera | Won | |
| National Academy of Television Arts and Sciences | 2019 | Pacific Southwest Emmy Award: Documentary | San Diego's Gay Bar History | Nominated | |
| National Academy of Television Arts and Sciences | 2021 | Pacific Southwest Emmy Award: Sports - Program | Club Frontera – Ep. 1 The City with No Team | Nominated | |
| Oceanside International Film Festival | 2020 | Best Screenplay | Leave 'Em Laughing | Nominated | |
| Oceanside International Film Festival | 2020 | Best Directing in a Short Film | Leave 'Em Laughing | Nominated | |
