= Leave 'Em Laughing (2020 film) =

2020 film by Chris Cashman

- Poster
- Directed by: Chris Cashman
- Written by: Chris Cashman; Carlo Coppo; Christopher Lusti
- Produced by: Mark Atkinson; Dave Branfman; Chris Cashman; Carlo Coppo; Christopher Lusti; Annie Willett
- Starring: Matthew Glave; Pete Gardner; Barrie Chase; Nikki Tyler-Flynn; Jackie Flynn; Mark Christopher Lawrence; Joe Nunez
- Cinematography: Stefan Mentil
- Edited by: Riley Wood
- Music by: David Schwartz
- Production company: NorthSide Pictures
- Release date: July 25, 2020
- Running time: 15 minutes
- Country: United States
- Language: English

Leave 'Em Laughing is a 2020 drama short film directed by Chris Cashman and written by Cashman, Carlo Coppo and Christopher Lusti. The film stars Matthew Glave, Pete Gardner and Barrie Chase. It screened at San Diego International Film Festival, The Valley Film Festival, Woods Hole Film Festival and won Best Art Design at Oceanside International Film Festival. The story is set around Dick Shawn's final act at University of California, San Diego.

== Plot ==
When Dick Shawn's stand up routine takes a not-so-funny turn, the audience is left to wonder what they just witnessed.

== Cast ==
- Matthew Glave as Dick Shawn
- Pete Gardner
- Barrie Chase
- Nikki Tyler-Flynn
- Jackie Flynn
- Mark Christopher Lawrence
- Joe Nunez

== Production ==
The film is based on a Los Angeles Times article written by Carlo Coppo. It circles around Coppo's experience of Dick Shawn's final performance at University of California, San Diego. The film was submitted to Sundance Film Festival and Tribeca Film Festival.

Matthew Glave was cast as Dick Shawn and Pete Gardner portrayed Carlo Coppo.

== Release ==
The film screened at San Diego International Film Festival, Oceanside International Film Festival, The Valley Film Festival, Coronado Island Film Festival, Woods Hole Film Festival, SENE Film, Music & Arts Festival and Austin Indie Fest.

== Reception ==
=== Critical response ===
Alan Ng of Film Threat scored the film 7.5 out of 10 claiming the "final act is why you want to see" the film.

=== Accolades ===
List of awards and nominations
Festival	Year	Award	Recipient(s)	Result	Ref.
Idyllwild International Festival of Cinema	2021	Grand Jury Award for Best Ensemble Cast Short Film	Various	Nominated	
Idyllwild International Festival of Cinema	2021	Juan Ruiz Anchia Award for Best Cinematography	Stefan Mentil	Nominated	
Idyllwild International Festival of Cinema	2021	Roger Taylor Award for Best Original Score - Short	David Schwartz	Nominated	
Oceanside International Film Festival	2020	Best Art Design (Short or Feature)	Elsa Mickelsen	Won	
Oceanside International Film Festival	2020	Best Screenplay (Short or Feature)	Chris Cashman, Christopher Lusti	Nominated	
Oceanside International Film Festival	2020	Best Supporting Actor	Matthew Glave	Nominated	
Oceanside International Film Festival	2020	Best Direction in a Short	Chris Cashman	Nominated	
Austin Indie Fest	2020	Best Screenplay	Chris Cashman, Christopher Lusti	Won	
Five Continents International Film Festival	2020 (March)	Audience Award 1st Place	Chris Cashman	Won	
Five Continents International Film Festival	2020 (March)	Best Drama Short Film	Chris Cashman	Won	
Five Continents International Film Festival	2020 (March)	Best Supporting Actor Short Film	Matthew Glave	Won	
Five Continents International Film Festival	2020 (March)	Best Director Short Film	Chris Cashman	Won	
Five Continents International Film Festival	2020 (March)	Best Production Short Film	Chris Cashman, Annie Willett	Won	
Festigious Los Angeles	2020 (February)	Best Drama	Chris Cashman	Won	
