= Safety (disambiguation) =

Safety is the condition of being protected against harmful conditions or events, or the control of hazards to reduce risk.

Safety may also refer to:

== Places ==
- Safety Island, Antarctica

== Government ==
- The Internet Stopping Adults Facilitating the Exploitation of Today's Youth Act, also known as SAFETY, a United States bill introduced in 2009
- SAFETY Act, a provision of the Homeland Security Act in the United States

== Music ==
- Safety (album), a 2002 album by Ty Tabor
- Safety (EP), a 1998 EP by Coldplay
- "Safety" (song), by J. Cole
- "Safety", a 2010 song by Dima Bilan from the album Mechtatel

== Sports ==
- Safety (cue sports), an intentional defensive shot
- Safety (gridiron football position), a type of defensive back
- Safety (gridiron football score), a type of scoring play
- Safety bicycle, an alternative to the penny-farthing

== Computing ==
- Safety (distributed computing), a class of guarantees in distributed computing
- Memory safety and type safety, classes of guarantees in programming languages

== Films ==
- Safety (2019 film), a French live-action short film
- Safety (2020 film), an American sports drama film

== Other ==
- Safety (firearms), a mechanism that prevents the discharge of a firearm when engaged
- Human security

== See also ==
- Category:Occupational safety and health
