= 2002 Council of the District of Columbia election =

U.S. election

- November 5, 2002

7 seats on the Council of the District of Columbia 7 seats needed for a majority
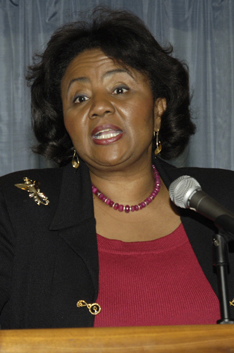

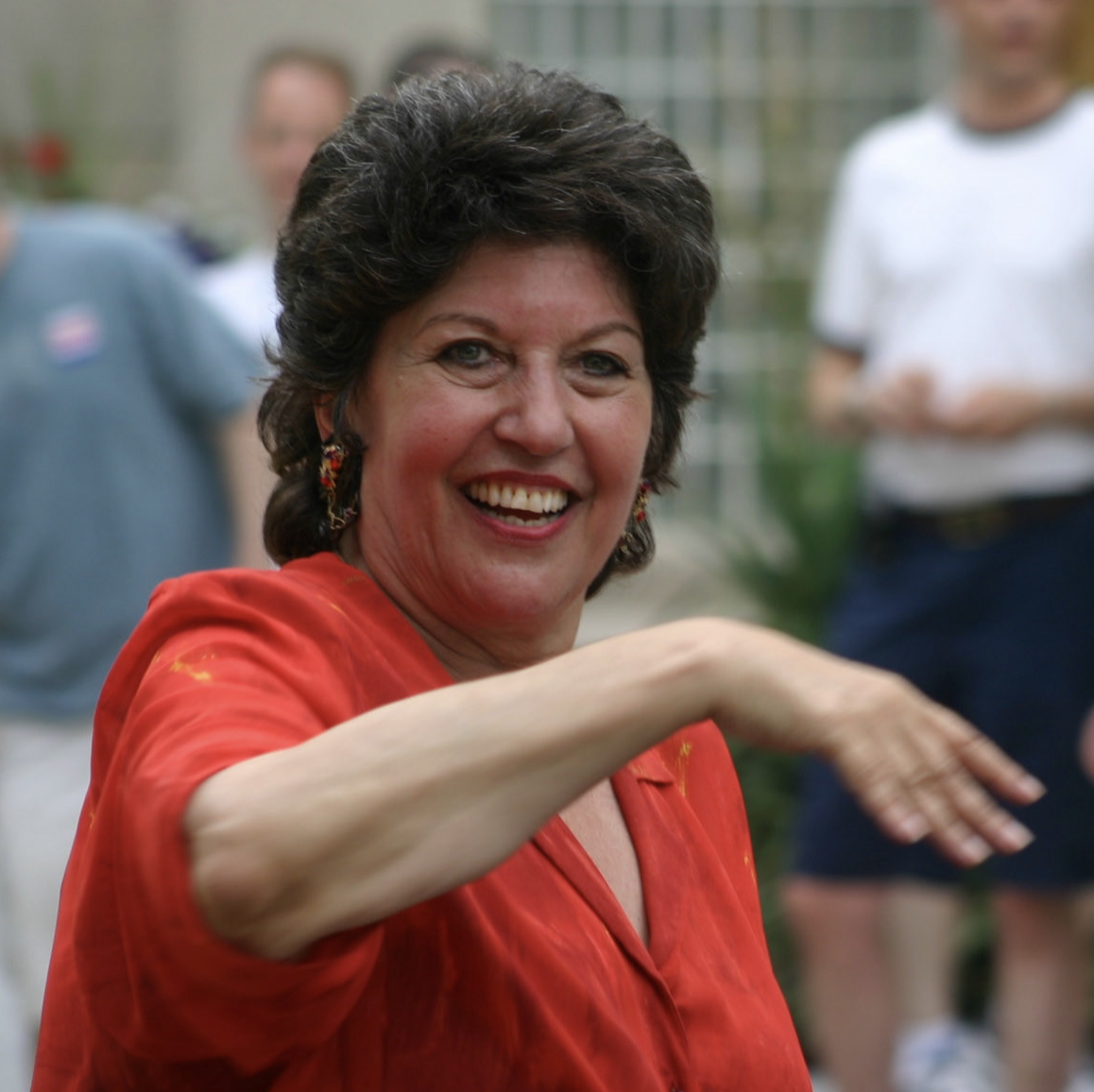
	Majority party	Minority party
Leader	Linda Cropp	Carol Schwartz
Party	Democratic	Republican
Seats before	11	2
Seats after	11	2
Seat change	Steady	Steady

The 2002 Council of the District of Columbia election was held on November 5, with primaries taking place on September 10. All incumbents were re-elected, with zero turnover in the composition of the Council.

== Summary ==
Democrats remained the largest party on the council, as they kept their 11 total seats. David Catania's re-election secured the two seats held by Republicans.

=== At-large ===
Position	Incumbent				Candidates
Position	Member	Party	First elected	Status	Candidates
Chairperson	Linda Cropp	Democratic	1997 (special)	Incumbent re-elected.	▌ ✓ Linda Cropp 88.4%; ▌ Debby Hanrahan 10.9%
At-large	David Catania	Republican	1997 (special)	Incumbent re-elected.	▌ ✓ Phil Mendelson 47.1%; ▌ ✓ David Catania 27.0%; ▌ Eugene Kinlow 9.1%; ▌ Michele Tingling-Clemmins 7.2%; ▌ Chris Ray 3.1%; ▌ Tony Dominguez 2.3%; ▌ Ahmad Braxton-Jones 1.9%; ▌ Kweku Toure 1.7%
At-large	Phil Mendelson	Democratic	1998	Incumbent re-elected.	▌ ✓ Phil Mendelson 47.1%; ▌ ✓ David Catania 27.0%; ▌ Eugene Kinlow 9.1%; ▌ Michele Tingling-Clemmins 7.2%; ▌ Chris Ray 3.1%; ▌ Tony Dominguez 2.3%; ▌ Ahmad Braxton-Jones 1.9%; ▌ Kweku Toure 1.7%

=== Wards ===
Position	Incumbent				Candidates
Position	Member	Party	First elected	Status	Candidates
Ward 1	Jim Graham	Democratic	1998	Incumbent re-elected.	▌ ✓ Jim Graham 84.5%; ▌ Edward Chico Troy 14.4%
Ward 3	Kathleen Patterson	Democratic	1994	Incumbent re-elected.	▌ ✓ Kathleen Patterson 78.2%; ▌ Eric Rojo 21.3%
Ward 5	Vincent Orange	Democratic	1998	Incumbent re-elected.	▌ ✓ Vincent Orange 86.2%; ▌ Gail Dixon 10.2%; ▌ Edward Henry Wolterbeek 2.6%
Ward 6	Sharon Ambrose	Democratic	1997 (special)	Incumbent re-elected.	▌ ✓ Sharon Ambrose 83.9%; ▌ Jenefer Ellingston 15.0%

== Chairperson ==
2002 Council of the District of Columbia Chairperson election
- November 5, 2002
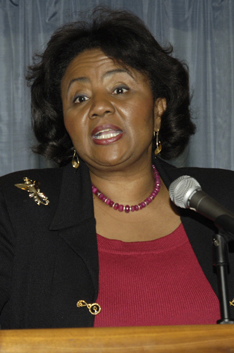

Nominee	Linda Cropp	Debby Hanrahan
Party	Democratic	DC Statehood Green
Popular vote	110,297	13,581
Percentage	88.37%	10.88%
Chairperson before election
Linda Cropp
Democratic
Elected Chairperson
Linda Cropp
Democratic

Incumbent chairwoman Linda Cropp beat Statehood Green candidate Debby Hanrahan to win a second full term as chairwoman of the Council.

=== Democratic primary ===
Candidates

- Linda Cropp, incumbent Chairwoman

Endorsements

Linda Cropp

Publications

- The Washington Post

2002 Council of the District of Columbia Chairperson Democratic primary
Party	Candidate	Votes	%
Democratic	Linda Cropp (inc.)	82,168	97.59%
Write-in		2,030	2.41%
Total votes		84,198	100%

=== Statehood Green primary ===
No candidates filed for the primary, with Debby Hanrahan winning the nomination through write-in votes.

2002 Council of the District of Columbia Chairperson Statehood Green primary
Party	Candidate	Votes	%
	Write-in	275	100%
Total votes		275	100%

=== General election ===
2002 Council of the District of Columbia Chairperson election
Party	Candidate	Votes	%
Democratic	Linda Cropp (inc.)	110,297	88.37%
DC Statehood Green	Debby Hanrahan	13,581	10.88%
Write-in		928	0.74%
Total votes		124,806	100%

== At-large ==
2002 Council of the District of Columbia At-large election
- November 5, 2002
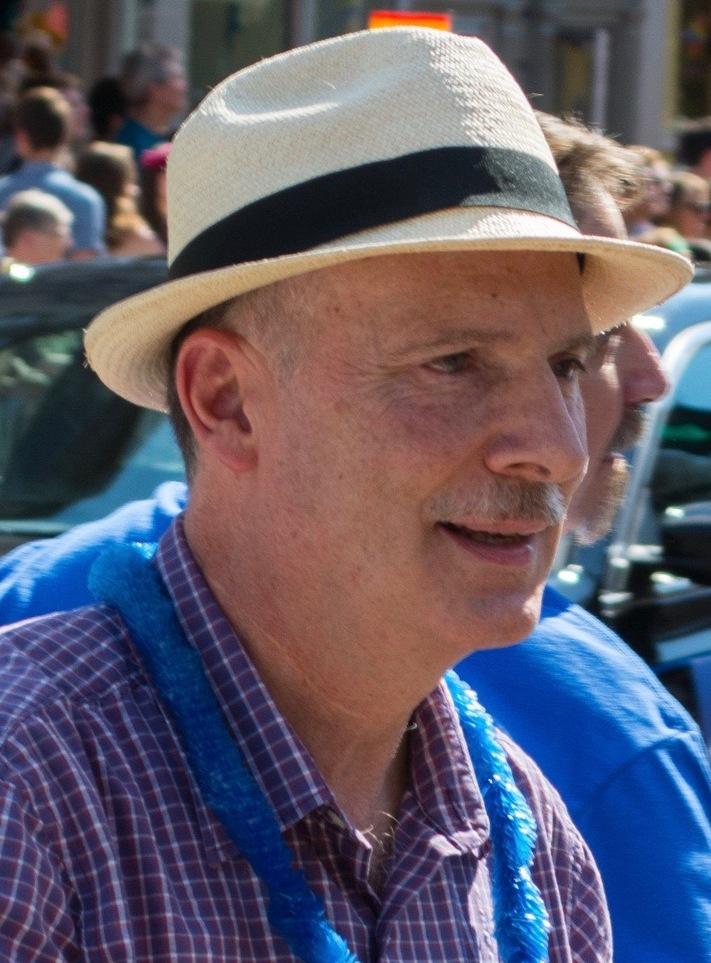

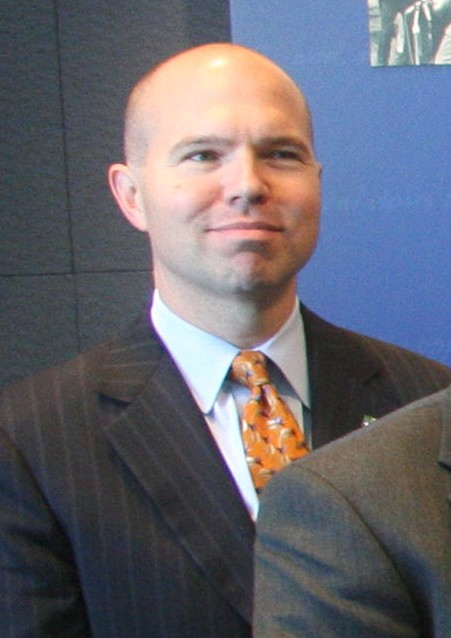

Nominee	Phil Mendelson	David Catania	Eugene Kinlow
Party	Democratic	Republican	Independent
Popular vote	90,316	51,698	17,522
Percentage	47.10%	26.96%	9.14%
Nominee	Michele Tingling-Clemmons	Chris Ray	Tony Dominguez
Party	DC Statehood Green	Independent	Independent
Popular vote	13,828	5,879	4,395
Percentage	7.21%	3.07%	2.29%
Councilmembers before election
David Catania (Rep.)
Phil Mendelson (Dem.)
Elected Councilmembers
David Catania (Rep.)
Phil Mendelson (Dem.)

Republican David Catania and Democrat Phil Mendelson each won election to their second full term.

=== Democratic primary ===
Candidates

- Al-Malik Farrakhan, community activist
- Phil Mendelson, incumbent At-large Councilmember
- M. Muhammad Shabazz, construction contractor
- Dwight E. Singleton, Ward 2 member of the District of Columbia State Board of Education
- Beverly Wilbourn, lawyer

Endorsements

Phil Mendelson

Publications

- The Washington Post

2002 Council of the District of Columbia At-large Democratic primary
Party	Candidate	Votes	%
Democratic	Phil Mendelson (inc.)	38,681	42.86%
Democratic	Beverly Wilbourn	26,379	29.09%
Democratic	Dwight E. Singleton	16,749	18.47%
Democratic	M. Muhammad Shabazz	4,098	4.52%
Democratic	Al-Malik Farrakhan	3,655	4.03%
Write-in		933	1.03%
Total votes		90,675	100%

=== Republican primary ===
Candidates

- David Catania, incumbent At-large Councilmember

Endorsements

David Catania

Organizations

- LGBTQ Victory Fund

2002 Council of the District of Columbia At-large Republican primary
Party	Candidate	Votes	%
Republican	David Catania (inc.)	3,324	93.11%
Write-in		246	6.89%
Total votes		3,570	100%

=== Statehood Green primary ===
Candidates

- Michele Tingling-Clemmons, consultant

2002 Council of the District of Columbia At-large Statehood Green primary
Party	Candidate	Votes	%
DC Statehood Green	Michele Tingling-Clemmons	470	80.76%
Write-in		112	19.24%
Total votes		582	100%

=== Independents ===
Candidates

- Ahmad Braxton-Jones, public policy advocate
- Tony Dominguez, child support enforcement officer
- Eugene Kinlow, consultant
- Chris Ray, Advisory Neighborhood Commissioner
- Kweku Toure, corrections officer

=== General election ===
2002 Council of the District of Columbia At-large election
Party	Candidate	Votes	%
Democratic	Phil Mendelson (inc.)	90,316	47.10%
Republican	David Catania (inc.)	51,698	26.96%
Independent	Eugene Kinlow	17,522	9.14%
DC Statehood Green	Michele Tingling-Clemmon	13,828	7.21%
Independent	Chris Ray	5,879	3.07%
Independent	Tony Dominguez	4,395	2.29%
Independent	Ahmad Braxton-Jones	3,708	1.93%
Independent	Kweku Toure	3,304	1.72%
Write-in		1,115	0.58%
Total votes		191,765	100%

== Ward 1 ==
2002 Council of the District of Columbia Ward 1 election
- November 5, 2002
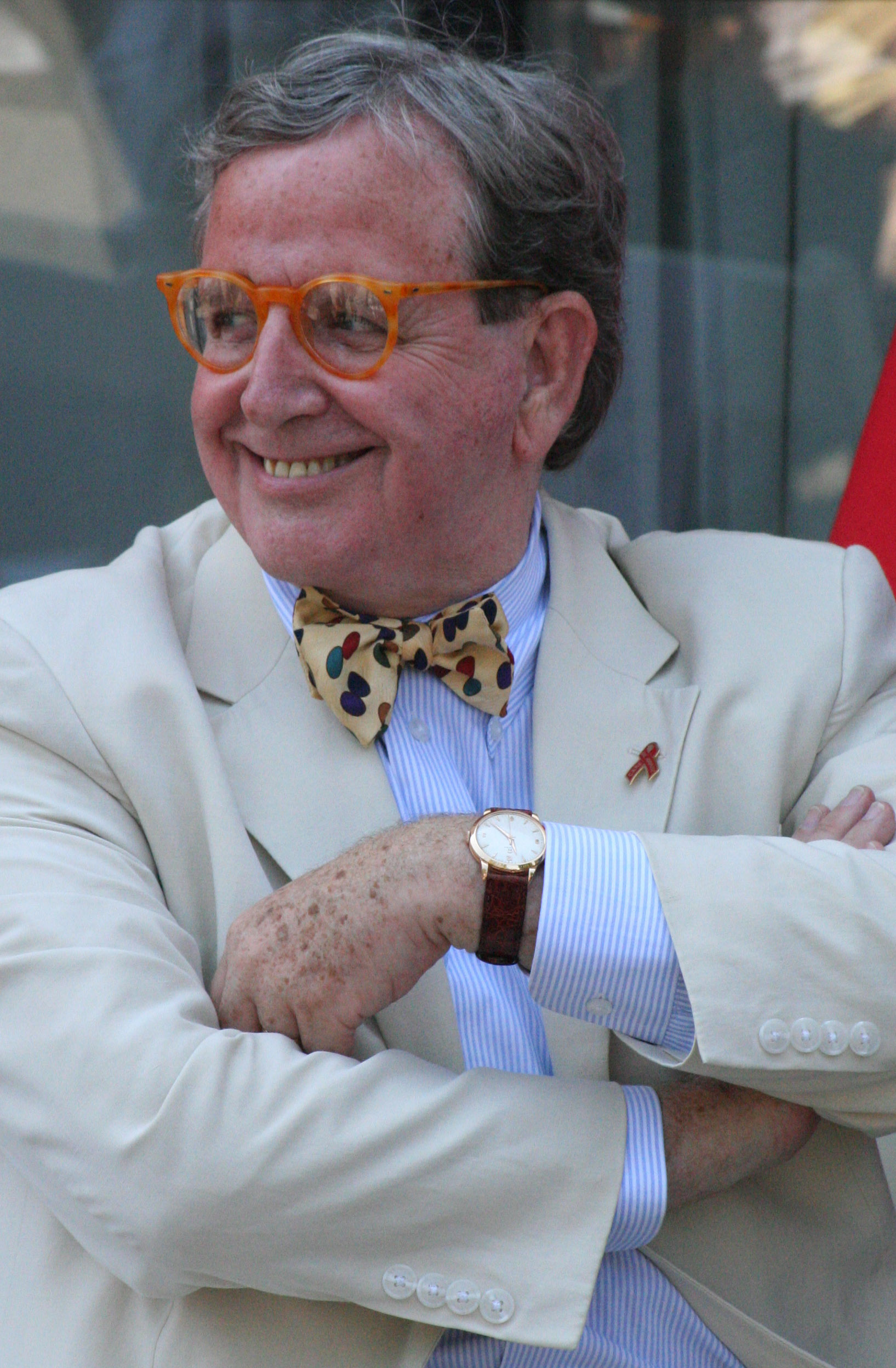

Nominee	Jim Graham	Edward Chico Troy
Party	Democratic	DC Statehood Green
Popular vote	11,258	1,910
Percentage	84.67%	14.36%
Councilmember before election
Jim Graham
Democratic
Elected Councilmember
Jim Graham
Democratic

Incumbent Councilmember Jim Graham won re-election to his second full term.

=== Democratic primary ===
Candidates

- Tony De Pass
- Jim Graham, incumbent Ward 1 Councilmember
- Dee Hunter, trial lawyer
- Hector Rodriguez, developer
- Shelore Williams, lawyer

Endorsements

Jim Graham

Organizations

- LGBTQ Victory Fund

Publications

- The Washington Post

2002 Council of the District of Columbia Ward 1 Democratic primary
Party	Candidate	Votes	%
Democratic	Jim Graham (inc.)	6,064	64.37%
Democratic	Shelore Williams	1,586	16.84%
Democratic	Dee Hunter	1,157	12.28%
Democratic	Hector Rodriguez	436	4.63%
Democratic	Tony De Pass	130	1.38%
Write-in		47	0.50%
Total votes		9,420	100%

=== Statehood Green primary ===
Candidates

- Edward Chico Troy, accountant

2002 Council of the District of Columbia Ward 1 Statehood Green primary
Party	Candidate	Votes	%
DC Statehood Green	Edward Chico Troy	122	76.73%
Write-in		37	23.27%
Total votes		159	100%

=== General Election ===
2002 Council of the District of Columbia Ward 1 election
Party	Candidate	Votes	%
Democratic	Jim Graham (inc.)	11,258	84.67%
DC Statehood Green	Edward Chico Troy	1,910	14.36%
Write-in		129	0.97%
Total votes		13,297	100%

== Ward 3 ==
2002 Council of the District of Columbia Ward 3 election
- November 5, 2002

Nominee	Kathleen Patterson	Eric Rojo
Party	Democratic	Republican
Popular vote	17,045	4,642
Percentage	78.20%	21.30%
Councilmember before election
Kathleen Patterson
Democratic
Elected Councilmember
Kathleen Patterson
Democratic

Incumbent Councilmember Kathleen Patterson won re-election to a third term.

=== Democratic primary ===
Candidates

- Erik Gaull, DC government staffer
- Kathleen Patterson, incumbent Ward 3 Councilmember

Endorsements

Kathleen Patterson

Labor unions

- Washington Teachers' Union

Local officials

- Anthony Williams, Mayor of the District of Columbia

Publications

- The Washington Post

2002 Council of the District of Columbia Ward 3 Democratic primary
Party	Candidate	Votes	%
Democratic	Kathleen Patterson (inc.)	10,468	72.89%
Democratic	Erik Gaull	3,847	26.79%
Write-in		46	0.32%
Total votes		14,361	100%

=== Republican primary ===
Candidates

- Eric Rojo, business consultant

2002 Council of the District of Columbia Ward 3 Republican primary
Party	Candidate	Votes	%
Republican	Eric Rojo	1,056	84.28%
Write-in		197	15.72%
Total votes		1,253	100%

=== General election ===
2002 Council of the District of Columbia Ward 3 election
Party	Candidate	Votes	%
Democratic	Kathleen Patterson (inc.)	17,045	78.20%
Republican	Eric Rojo	4,642	21.30%
Write-in		110	0.50%
Total votes		21,797	100%

== Ward 5 ==
2002 Council of the District of Columbia Ward 5 election
- November 5, 2002
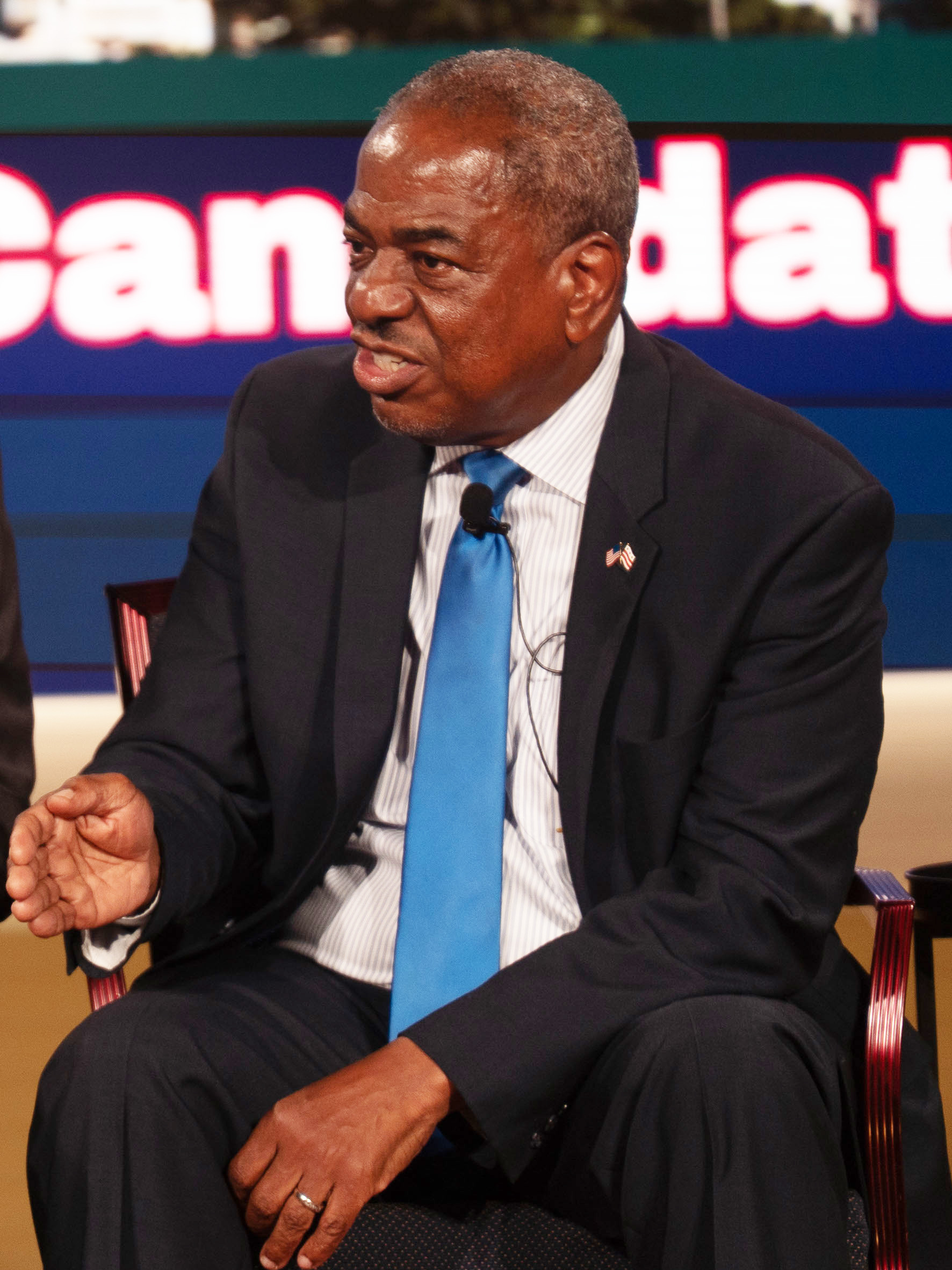

Nominee	Vincent Orange	Gail Dixon	Edward Henry Wolterbeek
Party	Democratic	DC Statehood Green	Republican
Popular vote	15,000	1,782	450
Percentage	86.16%	10.24%	2.58%
Councilmember before election
Vincent Orange
Democratic
Elected Councilmember
Vincent Orange
Democratic

Incumbent Councilmember Vincent Orange won re-election to his second full term.

=== Democratic primary ===
Candidates

- Vincent Orange, incumbent Ward 5 Councilmember
- Harry Thomas Jr., son of former Ward 5 Councilmember Harry Thomas Sr.

Endorsements

Vincent Orange

Publications

- The Washington Post

2002 Council of the District of Columbia Ward 5 Democratic primary
Party	Candidate	Votes	%
Democratic	Vincent Orange (inc.)	8,318	58.61%
Democratic	Harry Thomas Jr.	5,753	40.54%
Write-in		121	0.85%
Total votes		14,192	100%

=== Republican primary ===
Candidates

- Edward Henry Wolterbeek, perennial candidate

2002 Council of the District of Columbia Ward 5 Republican primary
Party	Candidate	Votes	%
Republican	Edward Henry Wolterbeek	127	61.95%
Write-in		78	38.05%
Total votes		205	100%

=== Statehood Green primary ===
No candidates filed for the primary, with Gail Dixon winning the nomination through write-in votes.

2002 Council of the District of Columbia Ward 5 Statehood Green primary
Party	Candidate	Votes	%
	Write-in	64	100%
Total votes		64	100%

=== General election ===
2002 Council of the District of Columbia Ward 5 election
Party	Candidate	Votes	%
Democratic	Vincent Orange (inc.)	15,000	78.20%
DC Statehood Green	Gail Dixon	1,782	10.24%
Republican	Edward Henry Wolterbeek	450	2.58%
Write-in		177	1.02%
Total votes		17,409	100%

== Ward 6 ==
2002 Council of the District of Columbia Ward 6 special election
- November 5, 2002

Nominee	Sharon Ambrose	Jenefer Ellingston
Party	Democratic	DC Statehood Green
Popular vote	14,152	2,536
Percentage	82.94%	15.04%
Councilmember before election
Sharon Ambrose
Democratic
Elected Councilmember
Sharon Ambrose
Democratic

Incumbent Councilmember Sharon Ambrose won re-election to her second full term.

=== Democratic primary ===
Candidates

- Sharon Ambrose, incumbent Ward 6 Councilmember
- Keith Andrew Perry, lawyer

Endorsements

Sharon Ambrose

Publications

- The Washington Post

2002 Council of the District of Columbia Ward 6 Democratic primary
Party	Candidate	Votes	%
Democratic	Sharon Ambrose (inc.)	8,152	64.08%
Democratic	Keith Andrew Perry	4,482	35.23%
Write-in		88	0.69%
Total votes		12,722	100%

=== Statehood Green primary ===
Candidates

- Jenefer Ellingston

2002 Council of the District of Columbia Ward 6 Statehood Green primary
Party	Candidate	Votes	%
DC Statehood Green	Jenefer Ellingston	65	68.42%
Write-in		30	31.58%
Total votes		30	100%

=== General Election ===
2002 Council of the District of Columbia Ward 6 election
Party	Candidate	Votes	%
Democratic	Sharon Ambrose (inc.)	14,152	83.94%
DC Statehood Green	Jenefer Ellingston	2,536	15.04%
Write-in		171	1.01%
Total votes		16,859	100%
