= Thane of East County =

2015 film by Jesse Keller

- Poster
- Directed by: Jesse Keller
- Written by: Jesse Keller
- Based on: Macbeth by William Shakespeare
- Produced by: Chris Cashman; Jesse Keller; Joan Frydenlund Keller; Kyle P. Sullivan; Phillip Vuchetich; Annie Willett
- Starring: Carr Cavender; Molly Beucher; Connor Sullivan; Karl Backus; Joshua Alan Jones; Ron Christopher Jones; Brian Patrick Butler
- Cinematography: Nate Elegino
- Edited by: Jesse Keller
- Music by: Son of Lone Cat
- Production company: Folk Process Films
- Distributed by: Summer Hill Entertainment
- Release dates: December 4, 2015 (Tampa Bay Underground Film Festival); January 25, 2018 (VOD)
- Running time: 90 minutes
- Country: USA
- Language: English
- Budget: $65,000

Thane of East County, also known as Blood Will Have Blood, is a 2015 black and white horror drama film written and directed by Jesse Keller in his feature film debut and is adapted from William Shakespeare's play Macbeth. The film won Best Drama at Poppy Jasper International Film Festival and stars Carr Cavender, Molly Beucher, Connor Sullivan and Karl Backus.

== Plot ==
James (Macbeth) and Jen (Lady Macbeth) become intertwined with each other as they rehearse a theatrical production of Macbeth. Duke (also Macbeth) is Jen's husband, Drew (Banquo) is James' best friend and Matt portrays Macduff and Malcolm. Things go awry as the actors begin to carry out the actions of characters they portray.

== Cast ==
- Carr Cavender as James
- Molly Beucher as Jen
- Connor Sullivan as Drew
- Karl Backus as Duke
- Joshua Alan Jones as Raymond
- Ron Christopher Jones as Kip
- Brian Patrick Butler as Matt
- Danny Morris as Jonathan
- Jessica Jerrain as Alex

== Production ==
The film was produced by Folk Process Films. The production team consisted of writer and director Jesse Keller, producers Chris Cashman and Annie Willett Thomas as well as cinematographer Nate Elegino. With a crew of ten, seventeen actors were cast.

The movie is based on Macbeth by William Shakespeare and was shot in black-and-white over sixteen days at the Victory Theatre in San Diego, inside a Fallbrook apartment, and exterior scenes in the desert near Borrego Springs. Films like Double Indemnity, Pi, Stranger Than Paradise and Following were inspiration for the film. A Kickstarter campaign raised $25,000, boosting the overall budget to $65,000. The film is Keller's directorial debut and he submitted it to Sundance Film Festival.

== Release ==
The film screened at Tampa Bay Underground Film Festival on December 6, 2015, and Cinema on the Bayou in Louisiana on January 28, 2017. It was distributed as Blood Will Have Blood by Summer Hill Entertainment in 2017. The film released on video on demand on January 25, 2018.

== Reception ==
=== Critical response ===
Steven West of Horror Screams Video Vault compared the film to Macbeth calling it a "well-intentioned attempt" but it "downplays the trashier elements that could have made it fun." It is on CinemaBlend's list of 32 Movies You Didn't Know Were Based On Shakespeare Plays.

Accolades
Festival	Year	Award	Recipient(s)	Result	Ref.
San Diego Film Awards	2017	Best Narrative Feature	Thane of East County	Won	
Poppy Jasper International Film Festival	2016	Best Drama	Thane of East County	Won	
Blow-Up Chicago International Arthouse Film Festival	2015	John Alcott Award for Best Cinematography	Nate Elegino	Nominated	
Blow-Up Chicago International Arthouse Film Festival	2015	Monica Vitti Award for Best Actress	Molly Beucher	Nominated	
