= Bradford Anderson =

American actor (born 1979)

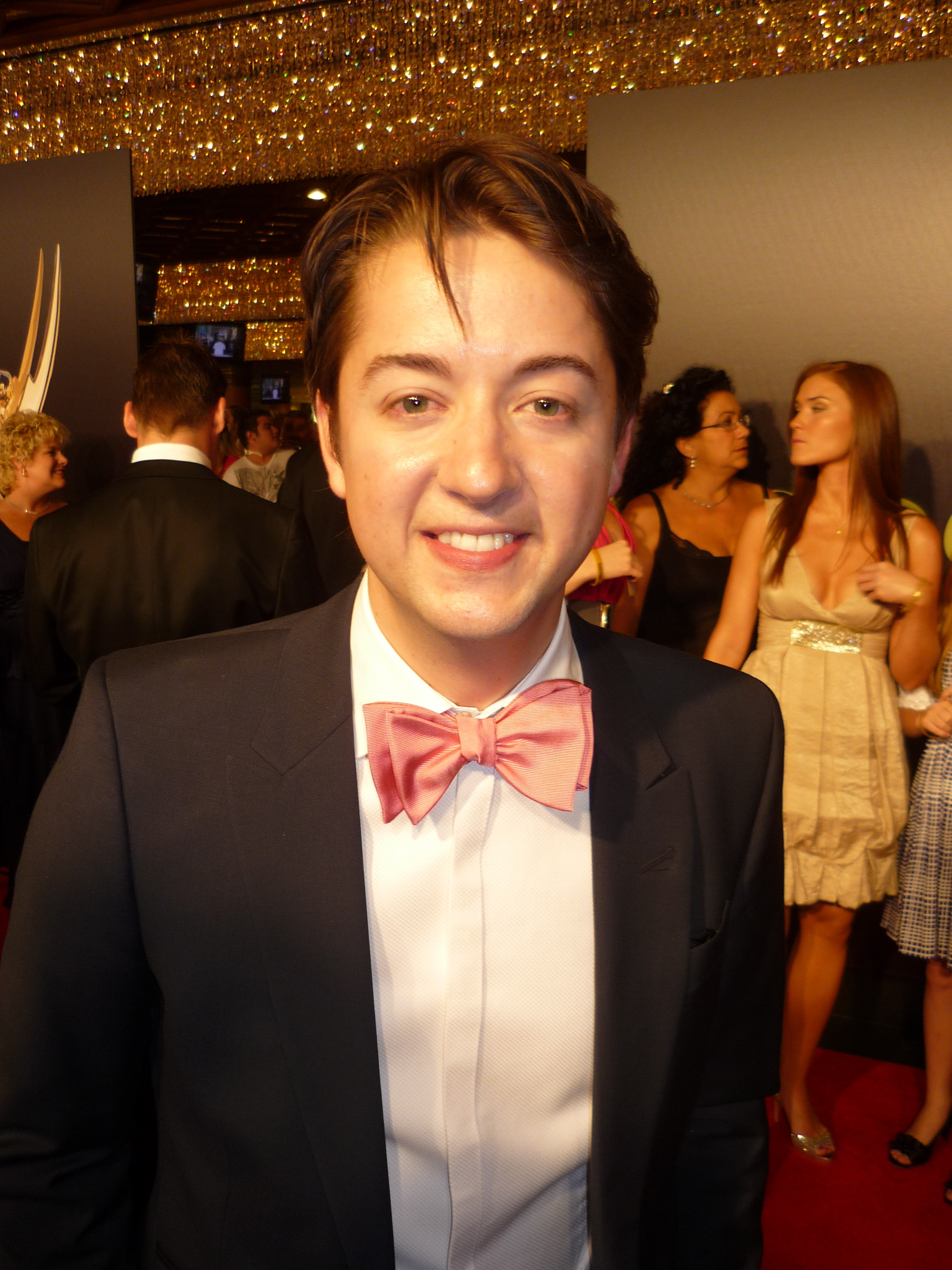
- Bradford Anderson in 2010
- Born: Bradford William Anderson; September 21, 1979 (age 46); Meredith, New Hampshire, U.S.
- Occupation: Actor
- Years active: 2003–present
- Spouse: Kiera Mickiewicz (m. 2010)
- Children: 2
- Website: bradford-anderson.com

Bradford William Anderson (born September 21, 1979) is an American actor. He is best known for playing the role of Damian Spinelli on the ABC soap opera General Hospital (2006 to 2013, 2014, recurring 2015 to present). He also played Spinelli on the spin-off General Hospital: Night Shift in 2007. He has received five Daytime Emmy Award nominations for his role on General Hospital.

== Early life ==
Anderson was born and raised in Meredith, New Hampshire. He made his stage debut at age six, playing Tiny Tim in a Laconia Street Car Company production of A Christmas Carol. His mother had encouraged Anderson and his sister to get involved with the theater company.

Anderson was involved in sports in high school, but he returned to acting during his junior year. His mother was working as a secretary for Lakes Region Summer Theatre, a summer stock group. Anderson learned that they needed an actor to play Joseph's younger brother in a production of Joseph and the Amazing Technicolor Dreamcoat. He auditioned and won the role. Anderson became more interested in acting after that experience.

He graduated from Inter-Lakes Middle High School in 1998. In his high school yearbook, he was voted Best Singer, Most Dramatic, and Most Likely to Succeed. After graduation, he moved to New York, attending the Tisch School of Performing Arts at New York University.

== Career ==
Anderson played a young William Faulkner in Blood of the Bear at New York's Workshop Theater in August 2004. He then joined The Philadelphia Theater Company. Anderson won the Philly Award for Best Supporting Actor for playing the role of Billy in Edward Albee's The Goat, or Who Is Sylvia? He reprised the role at the Arena Stage in Washington, D.C., co-starring with Stephen Schnetzer. His musical theater roles include Valentine in the Goodspeed Opera House revival of Babes in Arms and Arpad in She Loves Me.

Anderson moved to Los Angeles in 2005. He housesat for his former NYU classmate, Kristen Bell. He then landed a recurring role on her series, Veronica Mars, and guest starred on What About Brian.

In September 2006, General Hospital put out a casting call for a "college-aged kid" who was a cross between Seth Green and Spicoli, a character played by Sean Penn in Fast Times at Ridgemont High. Anderson won the role. Spinelli, a computer hacker, speaks in surfer/street savvy lingo and provides comic relief to the show. The role was initially meant to be recurring, but Anderson was put on contract in 2007. He also played Spinelli on General Hospital: Night Shift, a spinoff that aired on Soapnet in 2007.

Anderson was cast in the films Carts, Kissing Cousins, and American Pie Presents: Beta House. He guest starred on an episode of NCIS in 2008. Anderson hosted a web series for Soapnet, Camera Ready. In January 2009, he was part of a semi-staged reading of Tom Jones and Harvey Schmidt's Celebration at The Crest Theatre in Sacramento.

In 2009, Anderson received his first Daytime Emmy Award nomination for Outstanding Supporting Actor for his role on General Hospital. He was nominated again in the same category in 2010. It was announced that he had been cast in The Rabbit Factory, a TNT pilot. The project, which would have starred Steven Weber and D. L. Hughley, didn't go forward.

Anderson played Achilles on the web series The Further Adventures of Cupid and Eros. He made a guest appearance on Perception in 2012. Anderson received his third Daytime Emmy Award nomination for Outstanding Supporting Actor for his role on General Hospital in 2012. He was nominated in the same category in 2013. Anderson guest starred on an episode of NCIS: Los Angeles.

Anderson announced in December 2013 that he would be leaving General Hospital. He had been dropped to recurring status earlier that year. He made a brief return to the show in 2014. Anderson received his fifth Daytime Emmy Award nomination for Outstanding Supporting Actor for GH in 2014. He guest starred on Castle.

He returned to General Hospital on a recurring basis in 2015. He guest starred on Minority Report. In 2016, he was temporarily replaced on General Hospital with Blake Berris while he filmed a recurring role on Homeland. He starred as Jake Callahan in the film Falsely Accused, co-starring with Rosanna Arquette.

Anderson sings in a rock group, Port Chuck, along with General Hospital co-stars Steve Burton, Scott Reeves, and Brandon Barash. The group has performed at fan events. Anderson and Burton tour the U.S. with a road show, Stone Cold and the Jackal, performing music and comedy for audiences. In 2018, they launched a podcast, The Daily Drama (originally titled Stone Cold and the Jackal).

== Personal life ==
Anderson married Kiera Mickiewicz on April 10, 2010. They have two daughters, born in 2011 and 2014.

== Filmography ==
=== Film ===
Year	Title	Role	Notes
2007	Carts	Ed	
2007	American Pie Presents: Beta House	Jake Parker	
2008	Kissing Cousins	Justin	
2016	Falsely Accused	Jake Callahan	

=== Television ===
Year	Title	Role	Notes
2003	Ed	Nerd No.2	Episode: "The Case"
2005; 2006	Veronica Mars	Ryan	2 episodes
2006-2013; 2014; 2015–present	General Hospital	Damian Spinelli	Contract role; Recurring role
2006	What About Brian	Doctor	Episode: "What About Angelo's Ashes..." Credited as Bradford W. Anderson
2007	General Hospital: Night Shift	Damian Spinelli	13 episodes
2008	NCIS	Second Geek	Episode: "Last Man Standing"
2012	Perception	Shane Flannery	Episode: "Messenger"
2013	NCIS: Los Angeles	Val Winkler	Episode: "Recovery"
2014	Castle	Dwight Carruthers	Episode: "Room 147"
2015	Minority Report	Harlan Elbert	Episode: "Mr. Nice Guy"
2017	Homeland	Trent	2 episodes

=== Web series ===
Year	Title	Role	Notes
2011	The Further Adventures of Cupid and Eros	Achilles	3 episodes

== Awards and nominations ==
List of acting awards and nominations
Year	Award	Category	Title	Result	Ref.
2004	Barrymore Award	Best Supporting Actor in a Play	Edward Albee's The Goat or, Who is Sylvia	Nominated	
2009	Daytime Emmy Award	Outstanding Supporting Actor in a Drama Series	General Hospital	Nominated	
2010	Daytime Emmy Award	Outstanding Supporting Actor in a Drama Series	General Hospital	Nominated	
2012	Daytime Emmy Award	Outstanding Supporting Actor in a Drama Series	General Hospital	Nominated	
2013	Daytime Emmy Award	Outstanding Supporting Actor in a Drama Series	General Hospital	Nominated	
2014	Daytime Emmy Award	Outstanding Supporting Actor in a Drama Series	General Hospital	Nominated	
