= San Diego's Gay Bar History =

2018 documentary film

- Title screenshot
- Directed by: Paul Detwiler
- Written by: Paul Detwiler
- Produced by: Chris Cashman; Paul Detwiler
- Narrated by: Marie Cartier
- Cinematography: Kevin Todd
- Edited by: Fernando A. Garcia
- Production company: NorthSide Pictures
- Distributed by: KPBS-TV
- Release dates: June 10, 2018 (FilmOut San Diego); June 14, 2018 (KPBS-TV)
- Country: United States
- Language: English
- Budget: $38,000

San Diego's Gay Bar History is a 2018 documentary film written and directed by Paul Detwiler in his feature length directorial debut. Detwiler also produced the film with Chris Cashman.

== Production ==
The film was Detwiler's feature length debut. The film was made for $38,000 and featured vintage clips including the AIDS epidemic during the 1980s and follows with the closing of Numbers bar in Hillcrest. Nicole Murray-Ramirez is one of the community leaders featured.

== Release ==
The film premiered at FilmOut San Diego in on June 10, 2018, and was chosen out of 180 submissions to air on KPBS-TV on June 14th.

== Reception ==
=== Critical response ===
I hope that the film will inspire a new generation. –Paul Detwiler

Timothy Rawles at San Diego Gay and Lesbian News called it "an important, eye-opening LGBT documentary" and said "it's a love letter to San Diego's LGBT community." Allison Tate at The Advocate said it "will make you want to run out to your nearest gay bar and connect with our community like never before."

=== Accolades ===
Festival / Event	Year	Award	Recipient(s)	Result
FilmOut San Diego	2018	Best Documentary	Paul Detwiler	Won
National Academy of Television Arts and Sciences	2019	Pacific Southwest Emmy Award -Documentary	Paul Detwiler, Chris Cashman	Nominated
San Diego Film Awards	2019	Best Documentary: Feature Film	Paul Detwiler	Nominated
