= IRL (2019 film) =

- Poster
- Directed by: Ricardo Perez-Selsky
- Written by: Chase Hinton
- Produced by: Molly Beucher; Chase Hinton; Ricardo Perez-Selsky
- Starring: Chase Hinton; Johanna Sol; Eric Roberts; Haskell V. Anderson III; Taymour Ghazi; Elise Luthman; Samantha Cutaran; Molly Beucher
- Cinematography: Sarah Phillips
- Edited by: Tayler Braasch
- Music by: Jakob Freudendahl
- Production company: Cut To The Chase Films
- Release dates: March 5, 2019 (Idyllwild International Festival of Cinema); August 11, 2020 (DVD)
- Country: United States
- Language: English

IRL is a 2019 American drama film directed by Ricardo Perez-Selsky and written by Chase Hinton. The film stars Hinton, Johanna Sol, Eric Roberts and Haskell V. Anderson III.

== Plot ==
The story covers the ups and downs of online dating and modern dating.

== Cast ==
- Chase Hinton as Ian
- Johanna Sol as Sofia
- Eric Roberts as Jonathan
- Haskell V. Anderson III as Richmond
- Taymour Ghazi as Taymour
- Elise Luthman
- Samantha Cutaran
- Molly Beucher

== Release ==
The film premiered on March 5, 2019 at the Idyllwild International Festival of Cinema.

== Reception ==
The film has a 100% approval rating on Rotten Tomatoes based on 12 reviews.

Josiah Teal at Film Threat scored it 8 out of 10. Jonathan W. Hickman at Newnan Times-Herald scored it 7 out of 10. Aramide Tinubu at A Word with Aramide said it is "about taking a chance and putting your heart on the line even when the odds seemed stacked against you." Caroline Madden at Screen Queens said it is a "penetrating depiction of yearning for connection in a hyper-connected world." Tim Brennan at About Boulder said "in the weeds of a pandemic, love can still bloom."
