= French Roast =

- Poster for French Roast
- Directed by: Fabrice Joubert
- Written by: Fabrice Joubert
- Produced by: Bibo Bergeron
- Music by: Olivier Liboutry
- Release date: 30 October 2008
- Running time: 8 minutes
- Country: France

French Roast is a 2008 French animated short created by Fabrice Joubert. The short received the Best Animation Award at ANIMA Córdoba and was nominated for Academy Award for Best Animated Short Film in 2010 but lost to Logorama.

French Roast is the first short film by Fabrice O. Joubert, an animator, who worked from 1997 to 2006 at DreamWorks Animation and later worked as the animation director of A Monster in Paris (2011).

== Plot ==
In a fancy Parisian Café c. 1960, an uptight businessman sits at a table and orders a coffee. He cannot seem to pay, so he begins to stall, while in the background a disheveled beggar can be seen walking into the cafe asking for spare change. He shoos the beggar away. An old woman sits next to him asleep. The businessman attempts to retrieve money from her purse but is not successful. After many, many coffees a man with a WANTED poster with a reward offer comes in to hang the notice, he speaks to the waiter. Much later the businessman puts his hand in the old woman's purse and pulls out a rubber mask that is identical to the photo on the Wanted Poster. There is confusion as the businessman is mistaken for the criminal, the beggar returns, and the old woman returns. She grabs the mask and runs out of the cafe, hops on a bus and gets away. It's now time for the businessman to pay his tab but he doesn't have any money and starts to sob. The beggar finds money on the floor and pays the other man's tab before leaving the cafe.

== Release ==
French Roast was first released in France on 30 October 2008 at the Festival Voix d'Etoiles. It was later released in the Czech Republic on 3 May 2009 at the AniFest Film Festival, in Canada on 19 February 2010 in Waterloo, Ontario and in the USA on 19 February 2010, limited release.

== Accolades ==
Fabrice Joubert was presented with the Elña for Best Animation at the 2009 Córdoba International Animation Festival. Fabrice Joubert has been nominated for Academy Award for Best Animated Short Film in 2010 ending up losing to Logorama.
