= Mo Collins =

American actress and comedian (born 1965)

- Born: Maureen Ann Collins; July 7, 1965 (age 61)
- Occupations: Actress; comedian
- Years active: 1996–present

Maureen Ann Collins (born July 7, 1965) is an American actress and comedian who was a member of the ensemble on FOX's sketch comedy series Mad TV. Collins became well known for several characters during her tenure on the show.

She was a cast member from the 4th season (1998) through the 9th season (2004); she only appeared in fourteen episodes during season nine due to contractual reasons. She returned to Mad TV in the 10th season for one episode, and again when she made an appearance on the 300th episode doing her popular character Lorraine Swanson. Her best known role following her departure from Mad TV was as morning talk show host Joan Callamezzo on the sitcom Parks and Recreation.

The nickname Mo was first given to Collins by the football/drama coach of her junior high school whom she credits with introducing her to improv comedy.

== Career ==
=== Mad TV ===
Collins joined the cast of Mad TV at the beginning of season four and stayed until the end of season nine, though only appeared in 14 episodes during the ninth season. She was a guest star in 2005 during Season 10, in 2007 during the 300th episode on season 13, the final episode of season 14 in 2009 and the 20th anniversary reunion special in 2016.

=== Other work ===
- She has performed her one-woman show, Mo vs. Mo, in various cities, including Los Angeles and Chicago.
- Collins played in the fourth Hollywood Home Game edition of the World Poker Tour for the weSPARK Cancer Support Center. She placed 4th and won $2,500.
- She performed with Streetmosphere at the (formerly named) Disney-MGM Studios in the Hollywood Public Works.
- She voices Jan Ors in the Star Wars: Dark Forces: The Collector's Trilogy audio drama.

== Personal life ==
While attending St. Catherine University for visual arts, Collins was asked to leave in response to an act of graffiti that she and her fellow art program friends had committed.

Collins is in remission from a rare form of cancer known as gastrointestinal stromal tumor (GIST). She was diagnosed in spring 2011 when she noticed an odd lump in her abdomen. Collins said, "I would have done nothing about it. I was 44, feeling healthy, everything was going great for me, but my fiancé, Alex said, ‘You need to get it checked out’". Collins learned she had a primary tumor in her duodenum and was able to find a doctor who knew enough about GIST to know that she needed to see a specialist.

== Filmography ==
=== Film ===
Year	Title	Role	Notes
1996	Jingle All the Way	Mother on Phone	
2003	Detective Fiction	Jennifer Hannan	
2004	Jiminy Glick in Lalawood	Sharon	
2005	The 40-Year-Old Virgin	Gina	
2006	Danny Roane: First Time Director	Deidra Fennigan	
2006	Puff, Puff, Pass	Linda	
2007	Cook Off!	Van Rookle Farms Housewife	
2007	Knocked Up	Female Doctor	
2007	Cougar Club	Cindy Conrad	
2007	Carts	Hilda	
2009	Flying By	Kate	
2011	Division III: Football's Finest	Georgia Anne Whistler	
2014	Break Point	Barry's Mom	
2015	Batman Unlimited: Animal Instincts	Dispatch / Distinguished Woman	Direct-to-video
2016	Dirty Grandpa	Officer Finch	
2017	McDick	Molten Lava	
2022	My Babysitter the Super Hero	Kate	
2023	Red, White and Blue	Margo the Female Diner	Short

=== Television ===
Year	Title	Role	Notes
1998–2016	Mad TV	Various	155 episodes
2000	The Geena Davis Show	Tammy	Episode: "What I Like About You"
2000	As Told by Ginger	Nurse	Episode: "Hello Stranger"
2000–2010	Family Guy	Little Girl / Ms. Hobson / Kim Cattrall	4 episodes
2001	Just Shoot Me!	Robin	Episode: "The Gift Piggy"
2001	Ally McBeal	Flight Attendant	Episode: "The Getaway"
2001	Primetime Glick	Various	
2001–2003	Invader Zim	Zita / RoboMom / Dib's Computer	13 episodes
2003	Life's a B****	Midge McCracken	Lead Role
2003	Less than Perfect	Toni St. George	Episode: "Claude the Terminator"
2004	Girlfriends	Naisa Johnson	Episode: "New York Unbound"
2004	The Fairly OddParents	Ma Speevak	Episode: "Crash Nebula"
2004	Six Feet Under	Nancy Freymire	Episode: "Can I Come Up Now?"
2004	Fat Actress	Female Prison Guard	Episode: "Holy Lesbo Batman"
2004–2005	Arrested Development	Starla	5 episodes
2005	Joey	Ms. Lafferty	Episode: "Joey and the ESL"
2005	7th Heaven	Ellen	Episode: "Chicken Noodle Heads"
2005	Higglytown Heroes	Science Fair Judge	Episode: "Kip Gets Swing Fever/Wayne's Pieces of Gold"
2005, 2017	Curb Your Enthusiasm	The Nurse / Lisa Thompson	2 episodes
2005–2008	King of the Hill	Ella / Melinda / Ms. Clark	4 episodes
2006–2007	Ned's Declassified School Survival Guide	iTeacher	5 episodes
2007	Californication	Victoria	Episode: "Turn the Page"
2007	Frangela	Dr. Judy Green	Television film
2008	Pushing Daisies	Sister Larue	Episode: "Bad Habits"
2008	Chocolate News	Cindy Chamberlain	Episode #1.5
2008	According to Jim	Emily	4 episodes
2008	David's Situation	Celine	Television film
2009	The Goode Family	Checker / Lucy	Episode: "Pilot"
2009	Modern Family	Denise	Episode: "En Garde"
2009–2020	Parks and Recreation	Joan Callamezzo	20 episodes
2010–2011	Men of a Certain Age	Laura	5 episodes
2011	Love Bites	Nurse Sue	Episode: "Too Much Information"
2011	Suburgatory	Trish Shay	Episode: "Thanksgiving"
2011	Chuck	Colonel Caroline Haim	Episode: "Chuck Versus the Santa Suit"
2012	The Life & Times of Tim	Police Officer	Episode: "Pudding Boy/The Celebrity Who Shall Remain Nameless"
2012	Phineas and Ferb	Additional voices	Episode: "The Mom Attractor/Cranius Maximus"
2012	Ave 43	Joy Maybower	5 episodes
2013	Pound Puppies	Jen / Lenore / Pat	2 episodes
2014	The Greatest Event in Television History	Ruth	Episode: "Bosom Buddies"
2014	Sullivan & Son	Lilly	Episode: "Everybody Loved Frank"
2014–2015	Sheriff Callie's Wild West	Various	30 episodes
2015	Other Space	Helen Woolworth	2 episodes
2015	Pig Goat Banana Cricket	Feral Ann / Sally Salad / Beautiful Woman	Episode: "Gauntlet of Humiliation"
2015	Fresh Off the Boat	Christa	Episode: "The Big 1-2"
2015	Clash-A-Rama!	Villager / Healer / Female Wallbreaker	4 episodes
2015–2021	F Is for Family	Various	39 episodes
2016–2017	Lady Dynamite	Susan	14 episodes
2017	Workaholics	Bianca Toro	Episode: "Bianca Toro"
2017	Cassandra French's Finishing School	Judi	4 episodes
2017	Downward Dog	Kim	Episode: "Pilot"
2017	Ghosted	Monica Yates	Episode: "The Machine"
2017, 2019	The Stinky & Dirty Show	Tractor-Sue	2 episodes
2017–2022	Puppy Dog Pals	Various	29 episodes
2018	American Dad!	Darlene McKinnon	Episode: "The Census of the Lambs"
2018	Ghostwriter	Publisher	Episode: "Change Everything"
2018	Please Understand Me	Maureen	Episode: "Fred & Mo"
2018	Teachers	Tanya	Episode: "Step by Stepsister"
2018	Happy Together	Alarm System	Episode: "Home Insecurity"
2018	Pete the Cat	Callie's Mom	Episode: "A Very Groovy Christmas"
2018–2020	Dream Corp LLC	Patient 30	2 episodes
2018–2022	Fear the Walking Dead	Sarah Rabinowitz	28 episodes
2020	Single Parents	Lucy Cooper	Episode: "The Angle-Man"
2020	Lorraine	Lorraine	5 episodes
2020	Close Enough	Jojo	Episode: "Prank War/Cool Moms"
2023	Not Dead Yet	Jane Marvel	Episode: "Not a Tiger Yet"
2023	Grey's Anatomy	Jessica's Mother	Episode: "Training Day"
2024	Spidey and His Amazing Friends	Poppy	Episode: "Bubble Trouble/Rainy River Run"
2025	Night Court	Starla	Episode: "Abracadabra Alaka-Dan"
2025	The Simpsons	Jimbo Jones	Recurring, replaces Pamela Hayden after her retirement
2025–present	Iron Man and His Awesome Friends	Bolts	Recurring role
