= Club Frontera =

2016 film by Chris Cashman

- Directed by: Chris Cashman
- Written by: Chris Cashman
- Produced by: Eddie Cahan; Chris Cashman
- Starring: Martin Albert; Fernando Arce; Javier Arciga; Paul Arriola; Edgar Castillo; Katia Castorena; Roberto Cornejo; Joe Corona; Jose Cueva; David Faitelson; Kevin Faulconer
- Cinematography: Jeff Katz
- Edited by: Mario Genel; Jeff Katz; Andres Rico
- Music by: J. Lynn Duckett
- Release date: 2016

Club Frontera, also known as Xolos: Tijuana's Team, is a 2016 documentary film by Chris Cashman in his documentary directorial debut.

== Plot ==
Tijuana's Xolos leave a positive impact on a city known mostly for its negative influence on society.

== Cast ==
- Martin Albert
- Fernando Arce
- Javier Arciga
- Paul Arriola
- Edgar Castillo
- Katia Castorena
- Roberto Cornejo
- Joe Corona
- Jose Cueva
- David Faitelson
- Kevin Faulconer

== Production ==
Principal photography lasted three years in Tijuana and the film is Chris Cashman's documentary directorial debut. Cashman said his focus was to explore the positivity in the culture of Tijuana and that he did not set out to make a sports documentary. He said he was inspired after attending a match at Caliente Stadium.

== Release ==
The film premiered at the San Diego Latino Film Festival where Cashman and Alejandro Guido were panelists at a press conference. The film was initially 100 minutes, but after release, it was retitled to Xolos: Tijuana’s Team and cut down to 44 minutes.

== Reception ==
=== Critical response ===
Sports Illustrated said the film delivers "admirable detail" on how "Tijuana, once known primarily for negative reasons, has an undeniably positive story to tell." Pink Egg Media said it was a "wonderful film" and enjoyed "how it blended footage from the 50’s and 60’s which captured how Tijuana used to look, against images of today."

=== Accolades ===
Festival / Event	Year	Award	Recipient(s)	Result
Chicago Latino Film Festival	2016	Feature: Documentary	Chris Cashman	Nominated
Downtown Los Angeles Film Festival	2016	Best Feature Documentary	Chris Cashman	Nominated
San Diego Latino Film Festival	2016	Best Feature Documentary	Chris Cashman	Won
