= Fabrice Joubert =

French film director, animator, story artist, and producer

- Born: France
- Education: Paris-Sorbonne University; Gobelins Paris
- Occupations: Film director; animator; story artist; producer
- Years active: 1998–present

Fabrice O. Joubert is a French film director, animator, story artist, and producer. He made his directorial debut with the animated film French Roast (2008), for which he was nominated for Best Animated Short Film at the 82nd Academy Awards.

== Life and career ==
Joubert was born in France and grew up in Paris where he graduated from the Gobelins Animation School after majoring in film studies at the Sorbonne University. He started his career in Los Angeles, hired by DreamWorks Animation in 1998 to work as an animator on their first 2D animated feature The Prince of Egypt, and honed his skills in traditional and CG animation on their next five movies “

In 2007, he settled in Paris to write and direct his first short animated film French Roast. The film was screened throughout the world and won multiple awards before being nominated for an Oscar in 2010. In 2013, he moved back to Los Angeles to work for Illumination Entertainment (Despicable Me, Minions, The Secret Life of Pets, Sing and so on). There, he directed a series of short films and commercials.

In 2019, Fabrice wrote, directed and produced his first live action short film Safety.

In 2025, he co-directed with Alain Chabat the animated mini-series Asterix and Obelix: The Big Fight for Netflix.

== Filmography ==
Film and TV

- 1998: The Prince of Egypt – animator
- 2000: The Road to El Dorado – animator
- 2002: Spirit: Stallion of the Cimarron – CG character animator
- 2003: Sinbad: Legend of the Seven Seas – supervising animator
- 2004: Shark Tale – supervising animator
- 2005: Wallace & Gromit in The Curse of the Were-Rabbit – stop-motion animator
- 2006: Flushed Away – supervising animator
- 2008: French Roast – writer and director
- 2010: Despicable Me – character animation lead
- 2011: A Monster in Paris – animation director
- 2012: The Lorax – lead animator
- 2013: Despicable Me 2 – story artist
- 2013: Panic in the Mailroom – director
- 2015: Minions – animator (uncredited)
- 2015: Binky Nelson Unpacified – director
- 2019: Safety – director, writer, producer and visual effects
- 2022: Animal Attraction – co-director
- 2024: That Christmas – story artist
- 2025: Asterix and Obelix: The Big Fight – co-director
