= Rob Nagle =

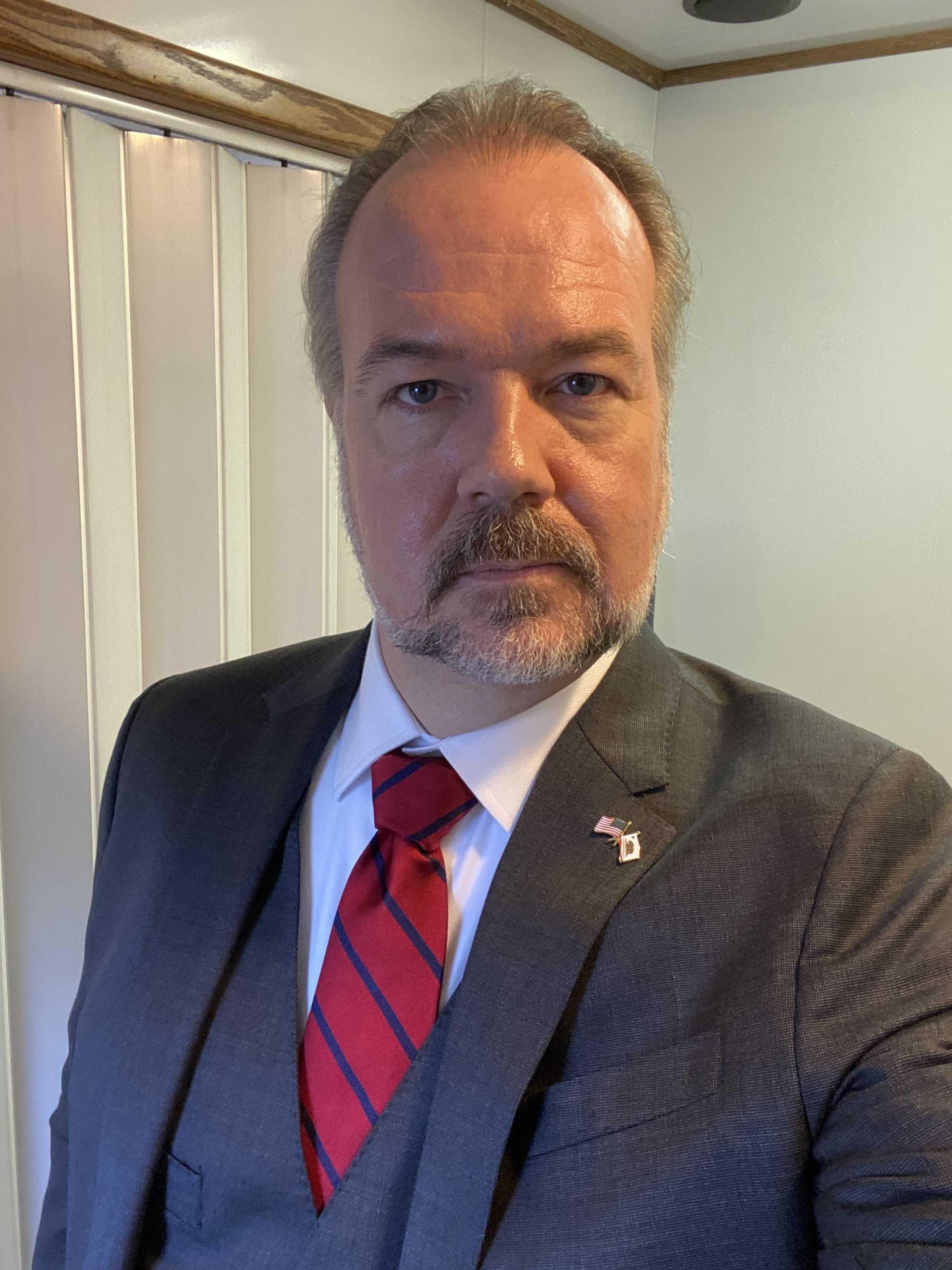
- Nagle on set at the LA Times Building, downtown Los Angeles, in February 2023
- Born: Eugene, Oregon, U.S.
- Other name: Robert P. Nagle
- Occupations: actor; director; teacher; acting coach
- Years active: 1992–present
- Website: robnagle.com

Rob Nagle is an American actor, director, and educator based in Los Angeles. He is a member of the Antaeus Theatre Company and has appeared in various television series, including Good Trouble, Dynasty and Dawson’s Creek, as well as films such as The Soloist and Bad Samaritan.

== Early life and education ==
Nagle was born in Eugene, Oregon, and raised in DeKalb, Illinois, and Williamsburg, Virginia. He attended Lafayette High School and Northwestern University, where he graduated with a degree in theatre and philosophy in 1992.

== Theater ==
Nagle is a resident company member at the Antaeus Theatre Company in Glendale, California. His stage work in the Los Angeles area includes productions at Boston Court Pasadena, The Fountain Theatre, and South Coast Repertory.

He has received several industry awards for his theatrical performances. In 2018, he received a Los Angeles Drama Critics Circle Award for his role in The Little Foxes. The following year, he received another LADCC Award for Lead Performance for his portrayal of Oscar Wilde in The Judas Kiss. He also received a 2026 Orange Curtain Review Award for Best Actor for his portrayal of Mark Rothko in John Logan’s Red at Laguna Playhouse. His regional credits include performances at Denver Center for the Performing Arts, Portland Center Stage, the Old Globe Theatre, and the Shakespeare Theatre Company in Washington, D.C.

== Television and film ==
Nagle’s television career includes recurring roles as Jack Hauss in Good Trouble, Mitchell in Dynasty, and Dr. Tom Frost in Dawson’s Creek. He has guest-starred in numerous series, including Mad Men, Little Fires Everywhere, NCIS: Los Angeles, Good American Family, and S.W.A.T. Exiles.

His film work includes appearances in Joe Wright’s The Soloist and several Garry Marshall films, including New Year's Eve and Mother's Day. In independent cinema, he has appeared in Christopher Munch’s political drama The 11th Green, and the Western thrillers To Hell and Gone and The Wolf and the Lamb. His work in the independent circuit also includes the ensemble drama Dead Women Walking, which premiered at the Tribeca Film Festival, and the heist film Boost. Other credits in the genre include the comedies Fishing Naked and Alien Vacation.

== Teaching ==
Nagle is an acting instructor specializing in on-camera technique, text analysis, and scene study. He joined the faculty of the American Musical and Dramatic Academy (AMDA) in 2024 and has previously taught at Theatre of Arts Hollywood, the Art of Acting Studio, and the Antaeus Academy.

== Personal life ==
Nagle has been married to casting director Heather Allyn since 1995. They reside in Los Angeles.

== Filmography ==
=== Film ===
Year	Title	Role	Notes
2026	The Wolf and the Lamb	Monsieur Jean LaGrange	
2025	Alien Vacation	Sally's Husband	
2024	Missing Rhythms	Vince	Short
2024	Sisters	George Pappas	
2024	Paper Marriage	Andrew Keener	
2024	Ownership	Appraiser Monroe	Short
2023	Incarcerated	Stigall	
2023	The Catastrophe	Gustav	Short
2022	Earthworm	Dad	Short
2022	Blonde	Radio Announcer	
2022	Last Weekend	Tom	Short
2021	Los Angeles	Bo	
2021	60 Seconds	Sydney	Short
2020	Paper Tiger	Gun Salesperson	
2020	The Never List	Liz's Dad	
2020	Kidnapped by a Classmate	Ken	TV movie
2020	The 11th Green	Hank	
2019	I Want Candy	Todd Loris	Short
2019	Wingmen	The King of Destin	Short
2019	The Lemon Tree	Fred	Short
2019	Signal to Noise	Roy	Short
2019	Safety	Gym Teacher	Short
2019	To Hell and Gone	Gary	
2018	The Cat Burglar	Lloyd Duskin	Animated short
2018	Confidence	Smoking Guy	Short
2018	Urchin	Guard	Short
2018	Dead Women Walking	Mark	
2018	Bad Samaritan	Don Falco	
2017	Boost	Lorenzo Champs	
2016	Roadies	Mike	
2016	Mother's Day	Hotel Bellman	
2015	House of Stairs	Martin	Short
2015	Straight Outta Compton	LAPD Westwood	
2015	Fishing Naked	Charlie	
2013	El Doctor	Andrew	Short
2012	Technical Support	Supervisor	Short
2012	The Pony Man	Security Guard	Short
2011	8 Minutes	Winston	Short
2011	New Year's Eve	Officer Nolan	
2011	The Healer	Governor	Short
2010	Life as We Know It	Neighbor Dad	
2010	The Boy Who Became King	James	Short
2010	A Soldier's Love Story	Coach Hanley	TV movie
2009	Shadow.net	FBI Agent #2	Short
2009	The Soloist	Neil	
2009	Caution Sign	Hal	Short
2008	Day's Eye	Thomas	Short
2006	Inside	Priest	
2005	Fun with Dick and Jane	Concerned Businessman	
2005	Wait Means Never	Money Man	
2004	Cellular	Paramedic	
2003	American Wedding	Floral Assistant	
2001	How High	Agent	
2000	Last Goodbye	Frank Scott	Short
2000	An American Daughter	Director	TV movie
2000	A.P.E. #9	A.P.E. #9	Short
1999	My Little Assassin	Minister	TV movie
1999	A.T.F.	Billy Jones	TV movie

=== Television ===
Year	Title	Role	Notes
2026	Gènesi	Jean Paul Vinay / Isaac Canabach	episodes: 1, 4, and 5
2026	S.W.A.T. Exiles	Walter Kovic	episode: "Burn Zone"
2026	Yacht Deals Monaco	Alexander / Radenko Milakovic / additional voices	(voice English version) episodes: "Winds of Change" / "Shifting Tides" / "Sea Trials" / "Unknown Waters" / "Final Approach"
2026	Banana Fish	Alexis Dawson	(voice English version) episodes: “Banal Story” / “Save Me the Waltz” / “Babylon Revisited” / "The Garden of Eden” / “Lo, the Poor Peacock”
2025	Leviathan	Count Volger	(voice English version) episodes: “Into the Storm” / “Prelude to War” / “Clankers and Darwinists” / “The Weight of the Past” “Far to the East” / “Shadows of Istanbul” / “Behemoth” / “Tunguska” / “Truth and Lies” / “Goliath” / “Under the Same Sky”
2025	Good American Family	Dr. Phil	episodes: "If You Tell a Story Well Enough" / "Blood on Her Hands"
2025	Suits LA	Greg Litvak	pilot episode: "Seven Days a Week and Twice on Sunday"
2023–2024	Good Trouble	Jack Hauss	episodes: "Once a Cheater" / "Tell Me Sweet Little Lies" / "Hanging by a Moment" / “It’s All Coming Back to Me Now” / “What Now?”
2018–2022	NCIS: Los Angeles	Albert Barrington	episodes: "The Body Stitchers" / "The Monster"
2022	First Love	Cooper Sullivan	main cast
2021	Batwoman	Professor Pyg	episode: "A Lesson from Professor Pyg"
2021	Mom	MC	episode: "A Community Hero and a Wide Turn"
2021	Corona Town	Jim	
2020	Little Fires Everywhere	Bruce	episode: "The Spark"
2020	The Minions of Midas	additional voices	(voice English version) episodes: “Dilema” / “Azar”/ “Culpa” / “Grieta” / “Salida” / “Lucha”
2019–2020	Dynasty	Mitchell	episodes: "The Caviar, I Trust, Is Not Burned" / "The Sensational Blake Carrington Trial" / "Caution Never Won a War"
2016-2019	Bordertown	additional voices	(voice English version) episodes: "The Fury (Part 2)" / "The End Game (Part 2)" / “The Lady in the Looking-Glass, Part 1” / “The Lady in the Looking-Glass, Part 2” / “Chess Story, Part 2”
2019	We Are the Wave	Heribert Butschama	(voice English version) episodes: "Do You Know That Feeling?" / "The 99%!"
2019	Dealbreakers	Michael	episode: "To Pay or Not to Pay"
2019	NCIS: New Orleans	Malcolm Armand	episode: "Boom-Boom-Boom-Boom"
2018	Superior Donuts	Agent Kozek	episode: "The ICEmen Cometh"
2018	Modern Family	Bill	episode: "He Said, She Shed"
2018	On the Spectrum	Avi	(voice English version) episode: "Going Outside"
2016	The Librarians	Barry	episode: "And the Rise of Chaos"
2016	Dirty Talk	Mr. Douglas	episodes: "Playing It Cool" / "What Is Art?" / "It's Spatula Time" / "Pilot"
2015	Grey's Anatomy	Howard Bonaman	episode: "All I Could Do Was Cry"
2014	CSI: Crime Scene Investigation	Mark Turner	episodes: "The Twin Paradox" / "The CSI Effect"
2014	I Didn't Do It	Interrogator	episode: "In the Doghouse with the White House"
2013	Criminal Minds	Tory Chapman	episode: "Pay It Forward"
2013	Mistresses	Officer Lewis	episode: "Payback"
2013	Touch	Detective Latham	episode: "Perfect Storm"
2012	Before We Go to Sleep	Phil	main cast
2012	Castle	Kirby	episode: "Secret's Safe with Me"
2012	Major Crimes	Father James Healy	episode: "The Ecstasy and the Agony"
2012	After the Bee	Yevgeny	
2012	NCIS	Wayne Usher	episode: "Playing with Fire"
2011	Harry's Law	Dr. Emmit Jones	episode: "American Girl"
2011	The Young and the Restless	Sergeant Burke	episode: #1.9698
2011	Life on the ENG	Newsroom Boss	
2010	Mad Men	Agent Landingham	episode: "Hands and Knees"
2009	Lincoln Heights	Mr. Donlevy	episodes: "Lucky" / "Bully for You"
2008	Eli Stone	Jeffrey Powell	episodes: "Unwritten" / "Praying for Time" / "One More Try"
2008	The Middleman	Renfield Rehnquist	episode: "The Great Vampiric Puppet Lamentation"
2008	Cold Case	Bernie Murphy	episode: "Bad Reputation"
2006	Studio 60 on the Sunset Strip	Moderator	episode: "The Focus Group"
2005	Without a Trace	Coach Bud Gillman	episode: "4.0"
2003	Everwood	Joel Hurwitz	episode: "The Miracle of Everwood"
2002–2003	Buffy the Vampire Slayer	Robson	episodes: "First Date" / "Bring on the Night" / "Never Leave Me" / "Sleeper"
2002	The Guardian	Hugh Williams	episode: "The Neighborhood"
2002	The West Wing	Chorus	episode: "Posse Comitatus"
2001	Dawson's Creek	Dr. Tom Frost	episodes: "Eastern Standard Time" / "Admissions" / "Mind Games" / "Four Stories"

=== Podcast series ===
Year	Title	Role	Notes
2026	Troilus and Cressida	Agamemnon	episodes: "The Milling” / “The Sifting” / “The Rising” / “The Kneading” / “The Molding” / “The Heating” / “The Baking”
2024	The Taming of the Shrew	Grumio	episodes: "To Suck the Sweets of Sweet Philosophy" / "A Nightmare in a Gown" / "Sweet as Spring-Time Flowers" / "The Mad Brain'd Bridegroom" / "He Is More Shrew Than She" / "Be It Moon or Sun or What You Please" / "Strength is in Surrender"
2023	Kevin Spacey Trial: Unfiltered	Kevin Spacey	episodes: "The Limelight" / "The Apology" / "There Once Was a Mom From Nantucket" / "The Unusual Suspect"
2022	The Prophecy	Coast Guard, Bobby/Policeman, Doctor	episodes: "All Roads Lead To..." / "Truth Is..." / "Come Through the Sawmill" / "Daniel"
2022	Marvel's Squirrel Girl: The Unbeatable Radio Show	Erik Lehnsherr (Magneto)	episodes: "Unbeatable" / "Who Would Win In A Fight?" / "The Fate of My Universe"
2021	The Zip Code Plays: Los Angeles	Lamont	episode: "91601: North Hollywood - End of the Line"
