= To Hell and Gone =

2019 film by Kyle Moore

- Poster
- Directed by: Kyle Moore
- Written by: Kyle Moore
- Story by: Carr Cavender; Joel Nott; Cyle Williamson
- Produced by: Chris Cashman; Carr Cavender; Kyle Moore
- Starring: Susan Gayle Watts; Carr Cavender; P.J. Marshall; Robert Morgan; Clayton Froning; Drew Connick; Rob Nagle; Pete Rockwell; Thaddeus Shafer
- Cinematography: Peter Mickelsen
- Edited by: Kyle Moore
- Music by: Sean Carney
- Production company: Aravaipa Productions
- Distributed by: Gravitas Ventures
- Release date: April 13, 2019 (Arizona International Film Festival)
- Running time: 82 minutes
- Country: United States
- Language: English
- Budget: $200,000

To Hell and Gone is a 2019 spaghetti western film written and directed by Kyle Moore in his feature length debut. The film stars Susan Gayle Watts, Carr Cavender, P.J. Marshall and Robert Morgan.

== Plot ==
A drifter crosses paths with deadly goons who have taken a rancher hostage on her property.

== Cast ==
- Susan Gayle Watts
- Carr Cavender
- P.J. Marshall
- Robert Morgan
- Clayton Froning
- Drew Connick
- Rob Nagle
- Pete Rockwell
- Thaddeus Shafer

== Production ==
The film is Moore's feature length debut. Principal photography took place on Main Street and the El Coronado Restaurant in Safford, Arizona while the majority of the film was shot in Klondyke, Arizona. Cavender's parents own the property where most of the film is set in Oro Valley, Arizona.

The film was financed for $200,000 with help by crowd-funding on Indiegogo.

== Release ==
The film premiered at Arizona International Film Festival on April 13, 2019. It was distributed by Gravitas Ventures in 2020.

== Reception ==
Jon Johnson at The Gila Herald said it is an original film, with characters resembling the cast of Reservoir Dogs. Jim McLennan at Film Blitz scored it a C+ claiming it is set up like Die Hard on a ranch but that it doesn't deliver.

Accolades
List of awards and nominations
Festival	Year	Award	Recipient(s)	Result
San Diego Film Awards	2020	Best Narrative Feature Film	Chris Cashman, Carr Cavender, Kyle Moore	Won
San Diego Film Awards	2020	Best Actor	Carr Cavender	Won
San Diego Film Awards	2020	Best Actress	Susan Gayle Watts	Won
