= Angelina Spicer =

American actress

- Born: Brooklyn, New York, U.S.
- Education: Howard University
- Occupations: Comedian, writer, activist
- Spouse: Joe Trigilio
- Children: 1
- Family: Jimmy Spicer (father)
- Website: angelinaspicer.com

Angelina Spicer is an American comedian, writer, and women's health activist. She is known for her advocacy of screening and treatment for postpartum depression.

== Early life and education ==
Spicer was born and raised in Brooklyn, New York, the daughter of hip hop artist Jimmy Spicer. She graduated from Howard University with a Bachelor of Fine Arts.

== Career and activism ==
Spicer has performed comedy sketches on tours and television shows including Jimmy Kimmel Live! and Late Night with Conan O'Brien.

After giving birth to her daughter in 2015, Spicer suffered from severe postpartum depression. Following her therapist's advice, she checked into a psychiatric ward for treatment. Spicer's experience led her to become an activist for women's health. She successfully lobbied for the passage of three bills to improve maternal health screenings in California. She also incorporated panel discussions on maternal health into her 2021 "Postpartum Revolution Road Trip" comedy tour, and began fundraising for a documentary.

Spicer has also advocated for vaccine equity, helping to get Black and Latinx residents of South Los Angeles vaccinated against COVID-19 in 2021. She spoke about these efforts on The Ellen Show with guest host Chelsea Handler, which helped bring in more money for this cause. She serves on the board of directors for March for Moms and is a health equity fellow for both the Families USA and the Schusterman Family Foundation.

== Honors and recognition (selected) ==
- 2022: Families USA Fellow
- 2022: Vital Voices Fellow
- 2023: Social Practice Resident for The Kennedy Center
- 2023: March of Dimes Celebrity Advocate Council

== Personal life ==
Spicer lives in Los Angeles with her spouse Joe Trigilio and their daughter Ava.
