= Magda Krysztoforska-Beucher =

Polish soprano and composer

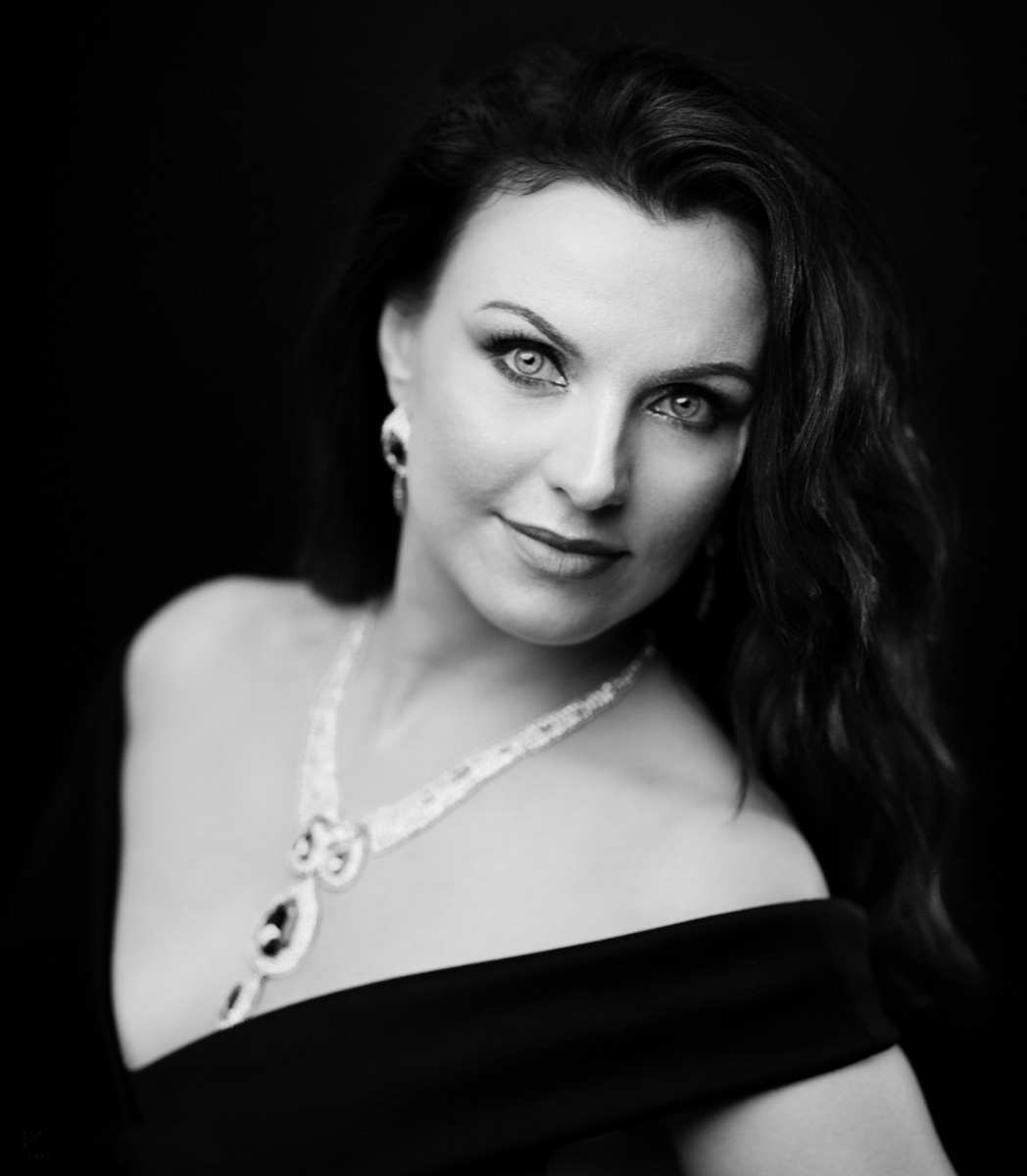
Magdalena Krysztoforska-Beucher

Magdalena Krysztoforska-Beucher called Magda Beucher, (born 22 May 1985) is a Polish soprano and composer.

== Life ==
Born in Warsaw, Krysztoforska-Beucher studied singing at the Chopin University of Music and at the Académie lyrique d’Osimo in Italy.

She is married to the French-Polish tenor David Beucher.

Speaking five languages, she tackles composers such as Mozart and Britten, through Verdi, Massenet and Tchaikovsky She also performs in recital, festivals and oratorios.

She is a member of the Magda et David Beucher ensemble.

== Prizes and awards ==
- 2014 : 2nd prize at the 11th International Singing Competition "Citta' di Pesaro" in Pesaro.
