= Chuck Wolfe (executive) =

Charles A. Wolfe
- Born: November 3, 1961 (age 63)
- Occupation: Chief Executive Officer
- Organization: The Chiles Group
- Spouse: Samuel Wolfe (married 2023-present)

Charles Albert "Chuck" Wolfe (born November 3, 1961) is the CEO of The Chiles Group, founded by Ed Chiles, the son of late Florida Governor Lawton Chiles for whom Wolfe worked for seven years. The Chiles Group operates several restaurants, an organic farm, aquaculture farm and bakery, and holds many real estate properties across Florida Gulf Coast. Wolfe had previously been a consultant to the Group. Collectively the business are focused on local and sustainable food practices. Wolfe took on this role in 2018, leaving a consulting firm he had founded.

During the Coronavirus Pandemic social distancing rules and other state and local government-mandated restrictions led the company to lay-off or cut hours for most its employees. The situation led to a crowdfunding efforts for the employees.

For 12 years, from 2003 to 2015, Wolfe was the president and chief executive officer of the Gay & Lesbian Victory Fund, an American political action committee dedicated to increasing the number of openly gay, lesbian, bisexual and transgender elected officials in the United States. He served on the Victory Fund's board of directors for four years prior to joining the staff. In 2003, he was selected by the board of directors to fill the position of CEO. Some elections he was involved in include those of Houston Mayor Annise Parker and U.S. Senator Tammy Baldwin.

Prior to his work with the Victory Fund, he was executive vice president and COO of the American Legacy Foundation, an anti-smoking organization which was created as a result of the Tobacco Master Settlement Agreement between 46 states and four large tobacco companies. His previous work on campaigns against teen smoking were considered a model for other states.

Wolfe entered the public sector as an appointee to the late Florida Governor Lawton Chiles. In addition being the operations manager for the governor's 1994 reelection campaign as operations manager, he had been employed in the governor's for seven years in roles such as director of external affairs, director of tobacco control and executive director of the Miami Financial Oversight Board. During his tenure, Wolfe developed and implemented programs that aided the relief efforts of Hurricane Andrew, the City of Miami's financial emergency, and the Florida Tobacco Pilot Program.

Wolfe, an Eagle Scout, has a long history within the Boy Scouts of America, including a two-year term on the National Executive Board. For more than ten years he campaigned against Scouting's discriminatory policies towards gays and lesbians.

Wolfe is a 1985 graduate of Stetson University in Florida. He currently serves on the board of trustees. A native of Florida, he has resided in Washington, D.C. since 1999.
