= Safety (2019 film) =

- Directed by: Fabrice Joubert
- Written by: Fabrice Joubert
- Based on: Short story by Lydia Fitzpatrick
- Produced by: Fabrice Joubert; Samuel François-Steininger
- Starring: Rob Nagle, Garrison Griffith, Gattlin Griffith, Marie Mouté
- Edited by: Lisa Shaw Phillips
- Music by: Mathieu Alvado
- Distributed by: Composite Films
- Release date: May 27, 2019 (Krakow Film Festival)
- Running time: 14 minutes
- Countries: United States, France

Safety is a live action short film directed by Fabrice Joubert and produced by Easter Moon Films & Composite Films, based on the short story Safety written by Lydia Fitzpatrick, about a school shooting in America. Engaged against gun violence the film has been presented and won awards in a number of festivals including at L.A. Film Awards, Lift-Off Los Angeles, Peak City Film Festival and Miami Short Film Festival.

== Plot ==
In a small-town elementary school, 8-year-old Michael lies on the cold gym floor, stretching with the rest of his class. Suddenly the class hears the sound of a gunshot nearby. As they rush to seek refuge in their gym teacher’s office, Michael senses something familiar about the shooter and makes a daring move, altering both of their lives forever.

== Awards ==
Year	Presenter/Festival	Award/Category	Status
2019	Peak City International Film Festival	"Best Director - Short Film"	Won
2019	L.A. Film Awards	"Best Drama, Best Director, Best Cinematography, Best Child Actor, Best Score"	Won
2019	Lift-Off Los Angeles	"Best Short Film"	Won
2019	Short shorts Film Festival	"Jury Prize"	Nominated
2019	Rhode Island International Film Festival	"Best Short Film"	Nominated
2019	Krakow Film Festival	"Best Short Fiction Film"	Nominated
