= Pete Gardner =

American actor

- Born: Pete Zahradnick; 30 May 1964 (age 62)
- Education: Skidmore College
- Occupation: Actor
- Notable work: Crazy Ex-Girlfriend

Peter Gardner (born Pete Zahradnick in Scarsdale, New York in 1964) is an American actor, best known for playing Darryl Whitefeather in The CW comedy-drama series Crazy Ex-Girlfriend.

== Early life ==
Gardner studied improv at the Second City improv group in Chicago. Gardner mentored and directed both Tina Fey and Amy Poehler in multiple productions during their tenure at the Second City.

== Career ==
In 2010 he played Franklin the dog catcher in The Search for Santa Paws. In 2015, Gardner joined the cast of Crazy Ex-Girlfriend as a series regular and the owner of law firm Whitefeather.

Gardner played the titular character in the short film Barry, released in 2016. He played Carl, a stockbroker and fellow employee of Ryan, played by Charlie Sheen in the 2001 movie Good Advice, also starring Angie Harmon and Denise Richards. He played Alan's football coach on Son of Zorn. He played Father Michaels in the 2018 comedy web television series Liza on Demand. He also played Dr. Terry Bournachle in the 2009 movie Labor Pains starring Lindsay Lohan.

== Filmography ==
=== Film ===
Pete Gardner' film credits
Year	Title	Role	Notes	Ref(s)
2019	Blowing Up Right Now	John		
2020	Leave 'Em Laughing	Carlo	Short film	
2024	Harold and the Purple Crayon	Detective Love		
TBA	Transcending		Post-production	

=== Television ===
Year: 2001 Title: Angel Role: Joseph Kramer Notes: Episode: "Dead End"

Pete Gardner' television credits
Year	Title	Role	Notes
2002	7th Heaven	Mr. Brand	Episode: "Regarding Eric"
2006	Malcolm in the Middle	MIT recruiter	Episode: "College Recruiters"
2008	Bones	Gary Flannery	Episode: "The Crank in the Shaft"
2011	Workaholics	Dale Carmichael	Episode: "6 Hours Till Hedonism II"
2013	Psych	Stumpy	Episode: "Deez Nups"
2015	The Brink	Agent	2 episodes
2015	Masters of Sex	Dean Snyder	Episode: "The Excitement of Release"
2015–2019	Crazy Ex-Girlfriend	Darryl Whitefeather	Main role
2016	NCIS	Harpers Ferry Police Detective Swanson	Episode: "Homefront"
2017	Son of Zorn	Football Coach	Episode: "The Quest for Craig"
2018	Robot Chicken	Mike Pence / Kidnapper (voice)	Episode: "Hi."
2018	Liza on Demand	Father Michaels	Episode: "The Phuneral"
2020	Vampirina	Thatch (voice)	Episode: "Aw, Shucks/Family Scareloom"
2022	Our Flag Means Death	Dutch Captain	Episode: "The Art of F**kery"
2022	Gordita Chronicles	Keith Colorado	Episode: "In America We Stereotype"
2023	Never Have I Ever	Coach Noble	2 episodes
