= Molly Beucher =

American actress

- Education: Randolph School; Northwestern University
- Occupations: Actress; screenwriter; film producer
- Known for: Eulogilia; IRL
- Notable credit: Thane of East County
- Awards: 2019 Excellence In Producing at Idyllwild International Festival of Cinema

Molly Beucher is an American actress, screenwriter, and film producer who starred in the film Thane of East County (2015), wrote and starred in the film Eulogilia (2017) and won Idyllwild International Festival of Cinema's Mary Austin Award for Excellence In Producing the film IRL (2019).

== Personal life ==
Based out of Los Angeles, Beucher is from Tennessee Valley, graduating from Randolph High School and Northwestern University in 2008. In 2016, She was engaged to Patrick Marsden after he proposed to her in-flight, flying from Dulles International Airport to Sao Paulo.

Over seven days in 2018, Beucher and Georgia Maguire trekked on a 500 mile motocross journey through Morocco, raising $5,000 for Education For All Morocco. They had several setbacks when their vehicles broke down and one incident where Beucher's bike briefly caught on fire.

== Career ==
Beucher worked with Robin Williams on The Crazy Ones shortly before his passing. In 2014, she was cast as the lead actress Jen (Lady Macbeth) in Thane of East County. In 2017, Beucher wrote and starred in Eulogilia, a short film inspired by being tasked with her own grandmother's eulogy, that screened at the Cleveland International Film Festival. She acted in and produced IRL in 2018.

== Filmography ==
Year	Title	Role	Notes
2005	Constellation	Clerk 2	
2013	The Crazy Ones	St. Pauli Girl	Episode: "Pilot"
2015	Thane of East County	Jen	
2017	Eulogilia	Vivian Wilde	also writer
2019	IRL	Carly	also producer

Accolades
Festival	Year	Award	Title	Result	Ref.
Blow-Up Chicago International Arthouse Film Festival	2015	Monica Vitti Award for Best Actress	Thane of East County	Nominated	
Idyllwild International Festival of Cinema	2019	Mary Austin Award for Excellence In Producing Feature Film	IRL	Won	
