= Nicole Murray-Ramirez =

American LGBT activist

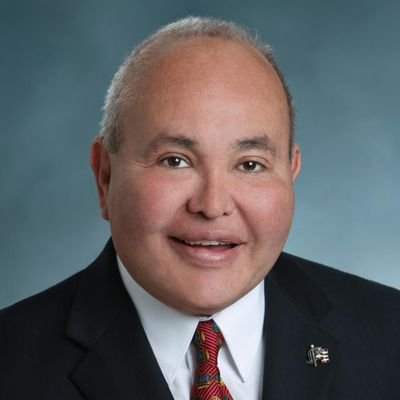
- Born: 1945 (age 80–81)
- Other names: Empress Nicole the Great, Queen Mother of the Americas

Nicole Murray Ramirez (born 1945) is an LGBT activist and frequent San Diego city committee appointee known as "Empress Nicole the Great, Queen Mother of the Americas" within the Imperial Court System of which she is the titular leader.

== Political activism ==
Murray Ramirez has been a Latino and gay activist for 45 years serving in roles as past National Chair of LLEGO, the National Chair of Stonewall 25, and the only gay activist in the country who has been elected to all four national boards of the Marches on Washington, DC. He was also elected chair of the Millennium March. He is the past State Chair of Equality California and is currently serving a four-year term on the national board of the National Gay and Lesbian Task Force. He was also appointed by the county Board of Supervisors to the Regional Task Force on AIDS in the 1980s and has served as a county deputy marriage commissioner.

Murray Ramirez was elected the chair of the San Diego Human Relations Commission (HRC) for four terms. The San Diego Human Rights Commission comprises leaders from the Religious, Latino, Asian-Pacific Islander, African American and Native American communities appointed by the mayor and the City Council. Murray Ramirez was first appointed by then-Mayor Dick Murphy, and reappointed by Mayor Jerry Sanders. When first elected four years ago, he was the first openly gay man elected as chair. Murray Ramirez was unanimously elected chair by the fellow commissioners. Murray Ramirez has served the last eight mayors of San Diego, and was elected as the chair of the first mayor's GLBT Advisory Board and the first GLBT Advisory Board to the chief of police.

Murray Ramirez served as chair of the Chief of Police Advisory Board, has served on other state and national boards, was the first San Diegan elected to chair the board for Equality California, received a Lifetime Achievement Award from the San Diego Latino Coalition, and was presented the Caesar Chavez Humanitarian Award by the widow of César Chávez. In 2012, Murray Ramirez successfully spearheaded the renaming of Blaine Street in the Hillcrest neighborhood, to Harvey Milk Street.

== Imperial Court System ==
Within the Imperial Court System, Murray Ramirez long held a leadership position as President of the Imperial Court Council and 1st Heir Apparent to José Sarria, the Widow Norton. At a Coronation Ball in Seattle, Washington on February 17, 2007, Sarria formally handed leadership of the organization over to Murray Ramirez. The latter assumed the title "Queen Mother of the Americas".

In 1975, in his drag persona as Empress of the Imperial Court de San Diego, Murray Ramirez rode in San Diego's first Pride Parade in an open vehicle amid jeers from hostile spectators. He was among the few to take the microphone and speak at the rally in Balboa Park immediately following. Regarding that day he said:

It was a scary and lonely march down Broadway ... Nobody applauded. And most gay people didn't come out to the sidelines because they were afraid.

Murray Ramirez was grand marshal for that parade on its anniversary 30 years later, and was also grand marshal in Tijuana's first pride parade.

In 2018, Murray Ramirez was interviewed for the documentary San Diego's Gay Bar History.

== Achievements ==
Founder

- San Diego County Hate Crimes Fund – Administered by Crime Stoppers
- Eddie Conlon Youth Fund – Provides books, clothing, food, transportation and shelter for youth/students (16–20 years old)
- Harvey Milk Student Scholarship –City college and university student scholarship program founded in 1979
- San Diego County Harvey Milk Diversity Breakfast – Breakfast event in the tradition of the annual Martin Luther King and Cesar Chavez breakfasts. Last year's breakfast had over 1,000 attendees.
- Toys for Kids Drive – Founded in 1975 and annually provides toys and holiday meals to families, children, agencies, shelters, etc. within San Diego County and Baja California, Mexico
- GLBT Community's Tijuana Blanket Drive – Provides blankets for children, seniors and families annually in Tijuana.
- Toni Atkins' Women's Health Fund – Provides free breast cancer examinations and funding for all women's health care concerns.
- The International Jose Julio Sarria Civil Rights Awards of the United States, Mexico and Canada – Honorees include Judy Shepard of Wyoming, Bishop Troy Perry, Cleve Jones and Army Lt. Dan Choi.
- The San Diego County Keith Turnham Veteran's Award – Named after World War II veteran and presented annually to a veteran for humanitarian and charitable work
- Ben Dillingham III Community Fund – Provides burial / cremation for those who are unable to afford these services, majority of whom are AIDS patients, in San Diego County and Baja California, Mexico.
- Children's Easter Egg Hunt – Annual event for children from 1– 11 years old at Trolley Barn Park in University Heights, San Diego. Over 600 children received Easter baskets at the last event.

Public service

- Served the last five mayors of San Diego in various capacities
- City of San Diego Human Relations Commission - First San Diegan to be elected to four terms as Chair of the Human Relations Commission, and currently serves as a City Commissioner
- San Diego Regional Task Force on AIDS – Appointed by the County Board of Supervisors in 1984, in the early years of the AIDS epidemic, to a four-year term. Also elected Chair of the People of Color Task Force
- First elected chair of the Mayor of San Diego's GLBT Citizen's Advisory Board
- First elected chair of the Police Chief of San Diego's Advisory Board
- Current nominee for the City of San Diego Gang Commission

HIV/AIDS

- Founder of the San Diego County AIDS Fund – the first social service agency for people and families living with HIV/AIDS
- Co-founder with then State's Assemblyman Peter Chacon of the People of Color AIDS Survival Effort (POCASE) of San Diego County
- Co-founder and named the Dr. Brad Traux AIDS Hospice House
- Founder of the Tijuana AIDS Fund – Provides funding for over a dozen Mexican AIDS agencies for families, children, men and women living with HIV/AIDS in Mexico
- Honored at the French embassy in Washington, DC for leadership on HIV/AIDS issues
- Featured in two national "AIDS Hero" published books

Awards / honors

Commissioner Ramirez's nearly 45 years of social justice and charity work has been recognized by countless awards and honors within the countries of Mexico, Canada and the United States, including:

- Cesar Chavez Social Justice Award – Presented by his widow, Helen Chavez
- The first Latino Unity Coalition's Lifetime Achievement Award for San Diego County
- Honorary Texan Award by Governor Ann Richards of Texas
- Key to the City of San Diego
- Key to the City of Portland
- "Nicole Murray Ramirez Day" in the cities of San Francisco, West Hollywood and San Diego
