= Dick Shawn =

American actor (1923–1987)

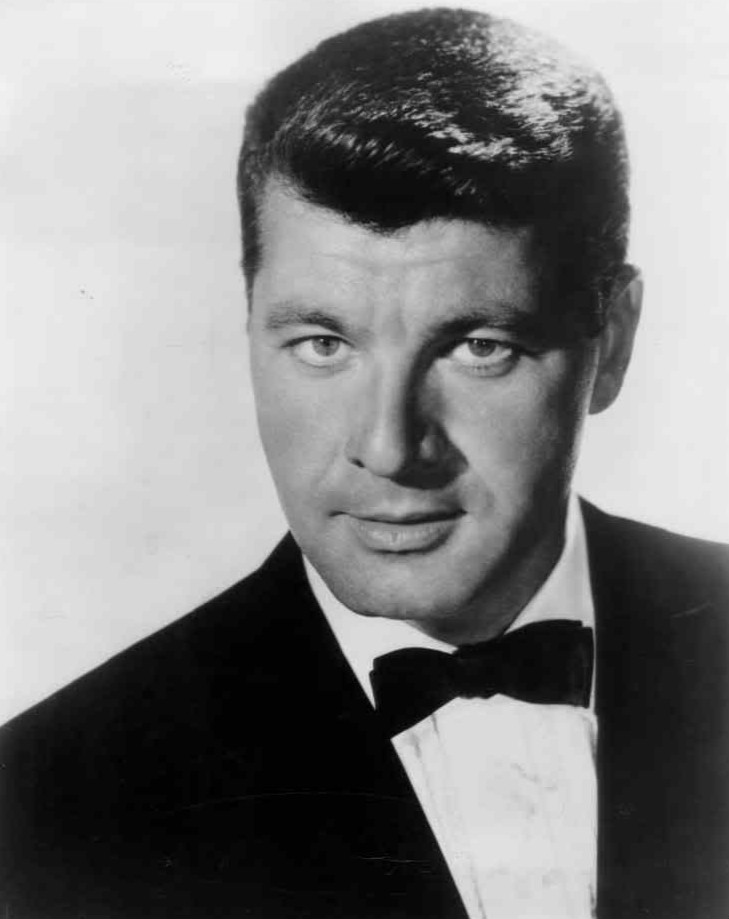
- Shawn in 1964
- Born: Richard Schulefand; December 1, 1923; Buffalo, New York, U.S.
- Died: April 17, 1987 (aged 63); San Diego, California, U.S.
- Resting place: Hillside Memorial Park Cemetery
- Other name: Richy Shawn
- Occupations: Actor; comedian
- Years active: 1956–1987
- Spouse: Rita Bachner (m. 1946)
- Children: 4
- Relatives: Joey Travolta (son-in-law)

Dick Shawn (born Richard Schulefand, December 1, 1923 – April 17, 1987) was an American actor and comedian. He played a wide variety of supporting roles and was a prolific character actor. During the 1960s, he played small roles in madcap comedies, usually portraying caricatures of counterculture personalities, such as the hedonistic but mother-obsessed Sylvester Marcus in It's a Mad, Mad, Mad, Mad World (1963), and the hippie actor Lorenzo Saint DuBois ("L.S.D.") in The Producers (1967). Beyond his film work, he appeared in numerous television shows from the 1960s through the 1980s.

== Career ==
Born in Buffalo, New York to a Jewish family, and raised in nearby Lackawanna, Shawn performed his stand-up comedy act for over 35 years in nightclubs around the world. His award-winning one-man stage show, The Second Greatest Entertainer in the Whole Wide World, was sometimes performed with a unique opening. When the audience entered the theater, they saw a bare stage with a pile of bricks in stage center. When the play began, Shawn emerged from the pile of bricks. The startling effect of this required complete concentration and breath control because the slightest movement of the bricks could ruin the surprise appearance.

In addition to roles in more than 30 movies and seven Broadway productions, Shawn made television appearances, toured often, and periodically performed a one-man show that mixed songs, sketches, and pantomime. He was a speaker at the Friars Club Roasts in Los Angeles and New York. At one of the X-rated roasts (a 1986 Playboy roast of Tommy Chong) that had overdosed on tasteless routines by previous speakers, Shawn walked up to the microphone, took a long pause, and "vomited" pea soup onto himself and other speakers at the dais.

In the Mel Brooks 1967 movie The Producers, Shawn won accolades for his portrayal of Lorenzo St. DuBois, whose "friends call" him LSD, an actor auditioning for and winning the part of Hitler in a theatrical production that was intentionally meant to fail.

Shawn's television appearances included The Ed Sullivan Show, TV movies, sitcoms (including Three's Company on which he played Jack Tripper's father), dramas including The Fall Guy and Magnum, P.I., and a music video for "Dance" by the hair metal band Ratt (1986). In the UK he appeared in Sunday Night at the London Palladium in 1958.

Amongst his roles in anthology TV series, he starred in an Amazing Stories episode "Miss Stardust", directed by Tobe Hooper, about a bizarre intergalactic beauty pageant, and played the Emperor in The Emperor's New Clothes for Shelley Duvall's Faerie Tale Theatre. He filled in for vacationing Johnny Carson as guest host on The Tonight Show Starring Johnny Carson on January 1, 1971, which saw the airing of the last cigarette commercial on American television (for Virginia Slims), one minute before the cigarette ads were banned.

== Personal life ==
Shawn married Rita Bachner in 1946, and they had four children: Amy, Wendy, Adam, and Jennifer. His only grandchild, Rachel Travolta, is the daughter of Wendy and her husband, Joey Travolta. He was a longtime resident of Englewood, New Jersey.

== Death ==
On April 17, 1987, during a performance at University of California, San Diego's Mandeville Hall, Shawn suffered a heart attack and collapsed face-down on the stage. The audience initially assumed that it was part of his act. After he had remained motionless for several minutes, a stage hand examined him and asked if a physician was present.

After CPR had been initiated, the audience was asked to leave the auditorium. Most in attendance remained, assuming that it was part of Shawn's act, and only began leaving after paramedics arrived. A notice in the following day's San Diego Union newspaper announced that Shawn had died during the performance at the age of 63. Shawn was interred at Hillside Memorial Park, a Jewish cemetery in Culver City, California.

== Legacy ==
Jim Knipfel claims that Andy Kaufman was inspired by Shawn.

Actor Matthew Glave portrayed Shawn in Leave 'Em Laughing, a short film surrounding his final moments.

== Filmography ==
=== Film ===
Year	Title	Role	Notes
1956	The Opposite Sex	Psychiatric Patient	
1960	Wake Me When It's Over	Gus Brukaber	
1960	The Wizard of Baghdad	Genii-Ali Mahmud	
1963	It's a Mad, Mad, Mad, Mad World	Sylvester Marcus	
1965	A Very Special Favor	Arnold Plum	
1966	What Did You Do in the War, Daddy?	Captain Lionel Cash	
1966	Way... Way Out	Igor Valkleinokov	
1966	Penelope	Dr. Gregory Mannix	
1967	The Producers	L.S.D. — Lorenzo St. DuBois	
1969	The Happy Ending	Harry Bricker	
1972	Evil Roy Slade	Marshall Bing Bell	
1977	Looking Up	Manny Lander	
1979	Love At First Bite	Lieutenant Ferguson	
1982	Good-bye Cruel World	Rodney Poinsetter / Ainsley Poinsetter	
1983	Rock 'n' Roll Hotel	Weevil King of Evil	
1983	Young Warriors	Professor Hoover	
1984	Angel	Mae	
1984	The Secret Diary of Sigmund Freud	The Ultimate Patient	
1985	Water	Deke Halliday	
1985	Beer	Talk Show Host	
1986	The Check Is in the Mail...	Donald	uncredited
1986	The Perils of P.K.	The psychiatrist	
1986	Captain EO	Commander Bog	Short Film
1987	Maid to Order	Stan Starkey	
1988	Rented Lips	Charlie Slater	Posthumous Release

=== Television ===
Year	Title	Role	Notes
1954–55	Max Liebman Spectaculars	unknown role	3 episodes
1955	Max Liebman Presents: Kaleidoscope	Guest	TV movie
1955–58	The Ed Sullivan Show	Himself	8 episodes
1958	The Eddie Fisher Show	Himself	3 episodes
1959	The Dinah Shore Chevy Show	Himself	"Eve Arden / Dick Shawn / Red Norvo"
1961	General Electric Theater	Felix Franklin	"Don't Let It Throw You"
1961	Checkmate	Danny Whitman	"Laugh Till I Die"
1961	The DuPont Show with June Allyson	Charlie Wilson	"The Old-Fashioned Way"
1961	Michael Shayne	Ernie Trask	"The Trouble with Ernie"
1963	The Jimmy Dean Show	Himself	"Dick Shawn / Whitey Ford"
1963	The Judy Garland Show	Himself	#1.11"
1963–67	The Jerry Lewis Show	Himself	2 episodes
1964	The Price Is Right	Himself	"03.20.1964"
1964–86	The Tonight Show Starring Johnny Carson	Himself	38 episodes
1965	For the People	Ernie Garatella	"Secure Any Special Privilege or Advantage"
1966	The Andy Williams Show	Himself	2 episodes
1966	The Bob Hope Show	Himself	"Murder at NBC"
1967	ABC Stage 66	Paul Benderhof	"I'm Getting Married"
1967	Sheriff Who	Crawford Offwhite	TV movie
1967	Off to See the Wizard	Tom Thumb	"Who's Afraid of Mother Goose?"
1967	That Girl	Himself	"The Mailman Cometh"
1968	The Lucy Show	Ace Winthrop	"Lucy and the Pool Hustler"
1968	What's My Line?	Self – Mystery Guest	"Dick Shawn"
1969	That's Life	unknown role	"Sex and the Married Man"
1969	The Joan Rivers Show	Himself	"05.04.1969"
1969	The Liberace Show	Himself	"07.27.1969"
1971	Dames at Sea	The Captain	TV movie
1971	The Bold Ones: The New Doctors	Nick Sutton	"The Glass Cage"
1971–78	The Hollywood Squares	Himself – Panelist	3 episodes
1972	Evil Roy Slade	Marshal Bing Bell	TV movie
1972–73	Love, American Style	Henry Chadwick / Howard	2 episodes
1973–74	The $10,000 Pyramid	Himself – Celebrity Contestant	18 episodes
1974	CBS Daytime 90	unknown role	"My Little Love"
1974	The Year Without a Santa Claus	Snow Miser (Voice Role)	TV movie
1975	Medical Center	Pete Rashid	"The Price of a Child"
1975–77	Captain Kangaroo	Doc Grannick the Mechanic / E.J. Fusay	3 episodes
1976	You're Just Like Your Father	Harry Tofler, Sr.	TV movie
1978	Mary	Skit characters	unknown episode(s)
1979	Fast Friends	Deke Edwards	TV movie
1979	Laverne & Shirley	Gatekeeper/Phone Representative	"Upstairs, Downstairs"
1980	Fantasy Island	Vic Erskine	"Skater's Edge / Concerto of Death / The Last Great Race"
1980–81	Mr. & Mrs. Dracula	Dracula	2 episodes
1981	Aloha Paradise	Cyrus	"Fiona / Engaged to Be Dumped / Fantasie Impromptu"
1981–82	The Love Boat	Harvey Blanchard / David Jackson	3 episodes
1982	Private Benjamin	Drysdale	"You Oughta Be in Pictures"
1982	Madame's Place	Himself	"Pinky's Shock"
1982	Slapstick Studios	Sheldon	unknown episode(s)
1983	Magnum, P.I.	Buzz Benoit	"Squeeze Play"
1983	Three's Company	Jack Tripper, Sr.	"Like Father, Like Son"
1984	Legmen	Casanova	"Knight at Casanova's"
1984	Steambath	Frankie Melnick	"Madison Avenue Madness"
1984	The Fall Guy	Edward Seraph	"Losers Weepers"
1984	Body Language	Himself	5 episodes
1985	Tales from the Darkside	Bo Gumbs	"If the Shoes Fit..."
1985	Hail to the Chief	Ivan Zolotov	series regular (6 episodes)
1985	Faerie Tale Theatre	Emperor / Guest Interviewee	2 episodes
1986	The Twilight Zone	Nelson Westbrook	"Gramma / Personal Demons / Cold Reading"
1986	St. Elsewhere	Edgard Eisenberg	"The Equalizer"
1987	Amazing Stories	Joe Willouhby	"Miss Stardust"

=== Theatre ===
Year	Title	Role	Notes
1948	For Heaven's Sake, Mother!	Milton Rubin	
1961–62	Come Blow Your Horn	Alan Baker (replacement)	replaced Hal March
1962	The Egg	Emile Magis	
1962–64	A Funny Thing Happened on the Way to the Forum	Prologus / Pseudolus (replacement)	replaced Zero Mostel
1964–65	Fade Out – Fade In	Byron Prong (replacement)	replaced Jack Cassidy
1965	Peterpat	Peter	
1968	I'm Solomon	Yoni, Solomon	
1975–76	A Musical Jubilee	Performer	
