= LGBTQ Victory Fund =

United States political action committee

LGBTQ+ Victory Fund
- Founded: 1991
- Type: 527 group
- Purpose: LGBTQ politicians
- Location: Washington, D.C.
- Method: Political endorsement Fundraising
- Key people: Evan Low (President and CEO); Richard Holt (Chair); Chris Abele (Chair); Campbell Spencer (Vice-Chair); Mattheus Stephens (Secretary); Chrys Lemon (Treasurer)
- Website: www.victoryfund.org
- Formerly called: Gay & Lesbian Victory Fund

LGBTQ+ Victory Fund (formerly the Gay & Lesbian Victory Fund and LGBTQ Victory Fund), commonly shortened to Victory Fund, is an American political action committee dedicated to increasing the number of out LGBTQ+ public officials in the United States. Victory Fund is the largest LGBTQ+ political action committee in the United States and one of the nation's largest non-connected PACs.

== Background ==
LGBTQ+ Victory Fund was founded in 1991 as a non-partisan political action committee. It provides strategic, technical and financial support to openly gay, lesbian, bisexual, transgender, and queer candidates and officials across the United States running for all levels of government. Its partner organization, Victory Institute, offers programs and training to elected officials.

To be considered for endorsement, candidates must identify as LGBTQ+, demonstrate community support and a realistic plan to win, demonstrate support of federal, state or local efforts to advance LGBTQ+ civil rights via the legislative or regulatory process, and demonstrate support of federal, state or local efforts to safeguard privacy and reproductive freedom. These requirements are less stringent for judicial endorsements.

LGBTQ+ Victory Fund employs a tiered system of endorsements. The categories are: "Game Changer," designating candidates who can become historic firsts and directly impact LGBTQ+ representation in the highest levels of government. "Spotlight," designating candidates who can make history or increase LGBTQ+ representation in low-equality states or in states with few or no LGBTQ+ lawmakers. Non-designated candidates are candidates who will increase the number of LGBTQ+ voices in government.

LGBTQ+ Victory Fund and LGBTQ+ Victory Institute are led by a president-CEO and a team of staff based in Washington, D.C. The Fund also has a board of directors, composed of top leaders of government, politics, and business. Additionally, the Victory Campaign Board is elected to recruit and endorse candidates, as well as provide financial resources.

== History ==
LGBTQ+ Victory Fund was founded in 1991 by Vic Basile and William Waybourn, with Waybourn becoming its first executive director. It provides strategic, technical and financial support to openly gay, lesbian, bisexual and transgender candidates and officials across the United States, helping them win elections at local, state and federal levels. Victory has helped elect several hundred out LGBTQ+ candidates to Congress, state legislatures, school boards and city councils. In addition, it works to help openly gay and lesbian officeholders develop professionally through its collaboration with the International Network of Lesbian and Gay Officials and co-sponsorship of the annual Gay & Lesbian Leadership Conference.

The group's founders, Dallas gay-rights activist William Waybourn and Human Rights Campaign Fund Executive Director Vic Basile, were inspired by the use of EMILY's List funds to power the 1990 election of former Governor of Texas Ann Richards. Waybourn and Basile planned an organization that would employ EMILY's List methodology—early money given sufficiently transforms "qualified candidates from 'fringe' status to 'front-runners'"—to propel gay and lesbian candidates to elected office.

In 1995, LGBTQ+ Victory Fund was a principal organizer of a meeting between representatives of the Clinton administration and several dozen leaders of gay and lesbian organizations. This meeting followed on the heels of the Presidential Appointments Project, whose goal was getting openly gay people appointed to all levels of the Clinton administration (and subsequently, the Bush and Obama administrations).

In 1997, activist Brian Bond was hired as executive director of LGBTQ+ Victory Fund from his position as the director of the Gay & Lesbian Leadership Council at the Democratic National Committee from to rebuild the nearly-bankrupt organization. He is credited by Tammy Baldwin with helping grow the visibility and size of the organization. He stepped down in 2003.

Former LGBTQ+ Victory Fund board member Chuck Wolfe was named executive director in 2003. Under his leadership, the organization's budgets grew exponentially.

Chuck Wolfe stepped down as president of the organization at the end of 2014. In 2015, Aisha Moodie-Mills became the new president and CEO of LGBTQ+ Victory Fund, which made her the first woman, first person of color and first lesbian to become the head of the organization. In 2017, Moodie-Mills' departure was announced and the new president and CEO was named, former Houston Mayor Annise Parker.

In 2018, the Gay and Lesbian Victory Fund and Institute was renamed the LGBTQ Victory Fund and Institute to accurately reflect the environment in which it works.

On March 3, 2023, LGBTQ+ Victory Fund announced the addition of the "plus" in their name to be formally known as LGBTQ+ Victory Fund.

On March 4, 2025, the Victory Fund announced that former California State Assemblymember Evan Low would be its next president and CEO, succeeding Parker.

== Candidates supported ==
LGBTQ+ Victory Fund endorses dozens of out LGBTQ+ candidates each year, increasing exposure to potential donors and providing both strategic and material support. Past endorsees include Tammy Baldwin, Barney Frank, Sean Patrick Maloney, David Cicilline, Lupe Valdez, Victoria Kolakowski, Patricia Todd and Virginia Linder. The first candidate the Victory Fund endorsed was Sherry Harris, who was elected to the City Council in Seattle, Washington, in 1991, making her the first openly lesbian African-American elected official.

In 2008, 80 of the group's 111 endorsed candidates won their elections.

In 2009, LGBTQ+ Victory Fund donated $40000 to the election of Annise Parker as mayor of Houston. In electing an out lesbian as its chief executive, Houston became the largest city in the country to have elected an out gay person as mayor. Local gay groups, particularly the Houston GLBT Political Caucus, had nurtured Parker's political career and were openly supporting her race. Victory Fund became a huge player in the race by providing a much-needed source of cash for Parker's grassroots efforts and helping her stay financially competitive with her two chief rivals, both of whose campaigns were lavishly funded. After the campaign, Parker referred to Victory Fund as her "secret weapon" and thanked the organization for its help.

In 2019, the Victory Fund announced it was endorsing Pete Buttigieg for president, which was its first presidential endorsement.

In 2022, Becca Balint won her primary in part with $1 million from the Victory Fund, "putting her on a path to become" Vermont's first Congresswoman. After the primaries, LGBTQ+ Victory Fund made 16 endorsements in congressional elections to expand LGBTQ+ representation in Congress by eight seats or approximately six million people.

In the 2022 United States House of Representatives election in New York's third congressional district, LGBTQ+ Victory Fund and Human Rights Campaign endorsed Democrat Robert Zimmerman over Republican nominee George Santos, in the first congressional race where both candidates were openly gay.

== Programs and events ==
=== International LGBTQ+ Leaders Conference ===
LGBTQ+ Victory Institute, the non-profit sibling organization of LGBTQ+ Victory Fund, hosts a variety of events throughout the year. Its most prominent is the International LGBTQ+ Leaders Conference hosted annually between November and December, bringing LGBTQ+ elected officials from around the world for a weekend of panels, speakers, and receptions. This conference grew out of a joint conference in 2004 with the International Network of Lesbian and Gay Officials (INLGO). LGBTQ+ Victory Institute and NLGO merged in 2005.

=== U.S. gatherings ===
LGBTQ+ Victory Fund also hosts a number of champagne brunches and receptions around the United States, in cities such as Chicago, Kansas City, and San Diego. The events bring together local LGBTQ+ elected officials and supporters and serve as fundraising for the organization.

=== Other events ===
Other events include various pride receptions celebrating LGBTQ+ Capitol Hill staffers and LGBTQ+ political appointees.

LGBTQ+ Victory Institute hosts events of its own as well as stewards several fellowship and internship programs. Events include LGBTQ+ Leadership Summits, which are day-long intensive trainings for LGBTQ+ leaders, and Candidate and Campaign Trainings, which are weekend-long crash courses on how to run for office. LGBTQ+ Victory Institute also hosts international trainings, and has received funding from USAID.

The Victory Congressional Internship program brings LGBTQ+ college students to Washington, D.C. for an intensive leadership program, and includes a semester-long internship with an LGBTQ-friendly member of Congress. Participants also attend the International LGBTQ+ Leadership Conference.

The David Bohnett Victory Congressional Fellowship brings an emerging LGBTQ+ leader to Washington, D.C. for a year-long intensive fellowship that supports the executive director of the LGBTQ+ Congressional Equality Caucus. It also includes a stipend and access to the International LGBTQ+ Leadership Conference.

The Victory Empowerment Fellowship was implemented by Aisha Moodie-Mills and helps emerging LGBTQ+ leaders of color and transgender leaders expand their campaign skills and policy-making power through a year-long membership and access to a Candidate Campaign Training and the International LGBTQ+ Leadership Conference.

The Bohnett Leaders Fellowship brings senior-level executives working with state and local governments, including government officials and elected officeholders, to a three-week intensive Executive Education program at the Harvard Kennedy School of Government in Cambridge, Massachusetts.

The Political Appointments Program works with LGBTQ+ leaders and pro-equality presidential administrations to ensure qualified LGBTQ+ representation in all agencies and levels.

=== Executive directors ===
Years	Name
1991–1996	William Waybourn
1996–1997	David Clarenbach
1997–2003	Brian Bond
2003–2015	Chuck Wolfe
2015–2017	Aisha Moodie-Mills
2017–2025	Annise Parker
2025–present	Evan Low

== Criticism from LGBT Republicans ==
LGBTQ+ Victory Fund has attracted criticism from LGBT Republican politicians and operatives for apparent bias in favour of candidates running for office as Democrats.

Richard Grenell, the first openly gay acting Cabinet-level official in the US, (Note: Grenell was the acting Director of National Intelligence from February to May, 2020. At no point did he hold a cabinet-level position. The first openly LGBTQ person to hold a cabinet-level position was Pete Buttigieg, Secretary of Transportation 2021-25.) leveled criticism at their alleged bias against LGBT Republicans. Robert Turner, head of the D.C. Chapter of the Log Cabin Republicans wrote an op-ed for the Washington Blade criticizing the then-Gay & Lesbian Victory Fund's pro-choice litmus test as harmful to its goal of electing LGBT candidates. The Victory Fund, however, has said that its vision of the "Right to Privacy" can be as conservative as supporting abortion only in cases of rape and incest. Carl DeMaio, a gay Republican member of the San Diego City Council who sought but did not secure the Fund's endorsement during his 2020 Congress bid alleged that the Victory Fund gave campaign documents of his, given as part of the Victory Fund's endorsement process, to his opponent.

According to its filings with the Federal Election Commission, between 2009 and 2024 the organization donated over $ 600,000 to 58 Democratic candidates seeking federal offices, and $13,400 to 5 state democratic parties. It further incurred over $1.15 million of independent expenditures in favour of five candidates in Democratic primaries, of which close to $1 million was in support of Becca Balint during the 2022 Democratic primary for Vermont's at large congressional seat, a contest she won by over 20 points. (It also spent approximately $62,000 against two Democrats facing LGBT primary rivals.) During that same period, it donated a total of only $20,000 to two Republican congressional candidates, Massachusetts Senate Minority Leader Richard Tisei in 2012 and 2014 (both unsuccessful) and University of New Hampshire professor Dan Innis (later state senator) in 2014 (defeated in primary phase).

As of November 2025, the organization's website lists over two hundred Democratic candidates seeking various offices as having been endorsed by the organization, along with two independent candidates and zero Republican candidates.

== See also ==
- ProudPolitics, a similar group in Canada

== Sources ==
- New York Times: Dunlap, David W. (November 6, 1994). "The 1994 Campaign: Homosexuality". The New York Times. "Some 130 candidates nationwide requested financial help from the Gay and Lesbian Victory Fund, a political-action committee, said its executive director, William W. Waybourn. The fund has supported 27 candidates this year, he said, almost twice as many as in 1993."
- New York Times: Jeffrey Schmalz, "As Gay Marchers Gather, Mood Is Serious and Festive," April 25, 1993, accessed Dec. 9, 2009. "At a celebration lunch sponsored by the Victory Fund, half a dozen appointed and elected officials who had not previously been known to be gay made an appearance."
