= The Valley Film Festival =

The Valley Film Festival (VFF) is an annual independent film festival held in the San Fernando Valley of northwestern Los Angeles, California.

The VFF is a venue for new independent work by Valley residents as well as American and international filmmakers. It screens various genres of short and feature-length films. These include fiction films, documentaries, animated films, and music videos. Typically, over about five days, the festival screens about 50-60 films. In addition to screenings, the festival provides educational panels and social events.

== Awards ==
The festival has juried Ten Degrees Hotter Awards, so named "because it's always 10 degrees hotter in the Valley." These juried awards are for one narrative feature, one documentary feature, and one short — from competitive sections composed of no more than eight films in each category.

Additionally, the festival has awards chosen by the audience for short films in non-competitive sections such as Comedy Short, Dramatic Short, Alumni Short, and Girls on Film.

== History ==
Founded in 2000 by Tracey Adlai, the VFF is the first and longest continually running film festival in the San Fernando Valley. Over the years, the festival has taken place in the fall, mostly at the El Portal Theatre in the North Hollywood (NoHo) Arts District. Other screening venues have included the Whitefire Theater and the CAP Theatre, both in Sherman Oaks, and the Laemmle NoHo 7 Theatre.

VFF alumni include film and television director John Putch, actor and director of The Help Tate Taylor, producers Laurence Malkin and Straw Weisman, three-time Emmy award winner Richard Gale, and two-time Emmy Award-winning video journalist Renee Sotile.

While primarily showing new independent films, the festival also has had some special screenings of studio-supported films, often made in or about the Valley. One of these was a 2007 screening of Fast Times at Ridgemont High, which included a Q&A with Robert Romanus and Amy Heckerling. The festival also has occasionally screened some adult entertainment films—or films about this business, such as Boogie Nights—in acknowledgment of the Valley's significant role in this area of film production.

== See also ==
- Film festivals in Los Angeles
- San Fernando Valley topics
