= List of film producers =

Following is a list of notable film producers, some of whom have also worked in other media.

(list is sorted alphabetically by surname)

== A–M ==
- J. J. Abrams – Lost, Cloverfield, Alias, Mission: Impossible III, Star Trek, Fringe
- Scott Aharoni – Bardo, Leylak, The Shallow Tale of a Writer Who Decided to Write About a Serial Killer
- Caroline Amiguet – Love All You Have Left
- James Amuta – Your Excellency, Oloture
- Darla K. Anderson – A Bug's Life, Monsters, Inc., Toy Story 3, Coco
- Judd Apatow – The Cable Guy, Anchorman, The 40-Year-Old Virgin, Knocked Up, Superbad, Freaks and Geeks
- Avi Arad – Spider-Man, X-Men, Blade
- Bonnie Arnold – Toy Story, Tarzan, Over the Hedge, How to Train Your Dragon, How to Train Your Dragon 2, How to Train Your Dragon: The Hidden World
- Syed Aman Bachchan – Kiragoorina Gayyaligalu, Edegarike, Thamassu, Aa Dinagalu
- Lawrence Bender – Pulp Fiction, Kill Bill, An Inconvenient Truth, Reservoir Dogs, Good Will Hunting
- Pandro S. Berman – The Hunchback of Notre Dame, The Picture of Dorian Gray
- Armyan Bernstein – Air Force One, The Hurricane, Children of Men, Bring It On
- Molly Beucher – IRL
- Drew Barrymore – Charlie's Angels, Donnie Darko, He's Just Not That Into You, Whip It
- Kathryn Bigelow – The Hurt Locker, Zero Dark Thirty, Detroit
- Jack Binder – First Reformed, Reign Over Me, The Upside of Anger
- Charles Brackett – The Lost Weekend, Sunset Boulevard, The King and I
- Albert R. Broccoli, Michael G. Wilson, Barbara Broccoli – James Bond film series
- Mel Brooks – The Elephant Man, The Fly, Frances, 84 Charing Cross Road, Young Frankenstein
- Jerry Bruckheimer – Top Gun, Crimson Tide, The Rock, Con Air, National Treasure, Pirates of the Caribbean film series
- Sandra Bullock – Hope Floats, Gun Shy, Miss Congeniality, Murder By Numbers, Two Weeks Notice, Miss Congeniality 2: Armed and Fabulous, All About Steve, George Lopez (TV series)
- Tim Burton – The Nightmare Before Christmas, Cabin Boy, James and the Giant Peach, 9
- Frank Capra – It Happened One Night, Mr. Deeds Goes to Town, Lost Horizon, Mr. Smith Goes to Washington, It's a Wonderful Life, State of the Union
- Jim Carrey – Bruce Almighty, Fun with Dick and Jane
- Charlie Chaplin – City Lights, Modern Times, The Great Dictator, Limelight
- Diablo Cody – Jennifer's Body, Young Adult, Ricki and the Flash, Tully
- Ethan Coen – Blood Simple, Raising Arizona, Barton Fink, Fargo, No Country for Old Men
- Harry Cohn – It Happened One Night, Twentieth Century, Lost Horizon
- Tom Cruise – Mission: Impossible, Vanilla Sky, Narc, The Others, Minority Report, War Of The Worlds, The Last Samurai
- Cecil B. DeMille – Samson and Delilah, The Greatest Show on Earth, The Ten Commandments, The Buccaneer
- Jeff Deverett – Full Out, Kiss and Cry, The Samuel Project
- Dean Devlin – Independence Day, Godzilla, The Patriot
- Walt Disney – Snow White and the Seven Dwarfs, Pinocchio, Fantasia, Mary Poppins
- Lorenzo di Bonaventura – Constantine, Shooter, Transformers
- Leonardo DiCaprio – The Aviator, The 11th Hour
- Miles Doleac – The Historian, The Hollow
- Kirk Douglas – Paths of Glory, Spartacus
- Michael Douglas – Romancing the Stone, Jewel of the Nile, One Flew Over the Cuckoo's Nest.
- Ava DuVernay – This Is the Life, I Will Follow, Middle of Nowhere, 13th
- Robert Evans – Love Story, The Godfather, Chinatown, The Saint
- Megan Ellison – Zero Dark Thirty, Her, American Hustle, Sausage Party, Spring Breakers, Phantom Thread, The Ballad of Buster Scruggs, If Beale Street Could Talk, Vice, Booksmart, House of Gucci
- Douglas Fairbanks – The Mark of Zorro, Robin Hood, The Thief of Bagdad
- Tina Fey – Sisters, Whiskey Tango Foxtrot
- Ted Field – The Amityville Horror, The Last Samurai, Runaway Bride, What Dreams May Come, Jumanji, Revenge of the Nerds
- Wendy Finerman – Forrest Gump, The Devil Wears Prada, Stepmom, One for the Money, P.S. I Love You, Love by the 10th Date
- Arthur Freed – Meet Me in St. Louis, An American in Paris, Singin' in the Rain
- Greta Gerwig – Lady Bird, Little Women, Mistress America, Nights and Weekends
- Mel Gibson – Braveheart, The Passion of the Christ
- Brian Grazer – Splash, The Paper, Apollo 13, How the Grinch Stole Christmas, A Beautiful Mind, Cinderella Man, The Cat in the Hat, The Da Vinci Code, Angels & Demons, Frost/Nixon, Rush, In the Heart of the Sea, Inferno
- D. W. Griffith – The Birth of a Nation, Intolerance, Abraham Lincoln
- Richard N. Gladstein – Finding Neverland, The Bourne Identity, Pulp Fiction, The Cider House Rules
- Samuel Goldwyn – Ball of Fire, The Best Years of Our Lives, Hans Christian Andersen
- Daniel Grodnik, National Lampoon's Christmas Vacation, Bobby, Powder, Moose
- Paul Haggis – Crash, Million Dollar Baby, Letters from Iwo Jima
- Don Hahn – Who Framed Roger Rabbit, Beauty and the Beast, The Lion King, The Hunchback of Notre Dame, The Emperor's New Groove, Atlantis: The Lost Empire, The Haunted Mansion, Frankenweenie, Maleficent, Beauty and the Beast (2017 film), Wonder Park
- Tom Hanks – Cast Away, Band of Brothers, Mamma Mia, My Big Fat Greek Wedding, The Polar Express, Evan Almighty, My Life in Ruins, City of Ember, The Pacific
- David Heyman – Harry Potter film series
- Alfred Hitchcock – Strangers on a Train, North by Northwest, Psycho, The Birds
- Ron Howard – The Alamo, Curious George, Restless, Cowboys & Aliens, The Good Lie, In the Heart of the Sea
- Howard Hughes – Hell's Angels, Scarface, The Outlaw
- Gale Anne Hurd – Aliens, Armageddon, Terminator 3: Rise of the Machines,Æon Flux, The Incredible Hulk
- Peter Jackson – The Lord of the Rings film series, King Kong, District 9, The Hobbit film series
- Nina Jacobson – The Hunger Games, Crazy Rich Asians, Diary of a Wimpy Kid, The Goldfinch
- Joseph Janni – film producer of over fifty films, including Far from the Madding Crowd, A Kind of Loving and Yanks. Worked closely with John Schlesinger.
- Norman Jewison – The Russians Are Coming, the Russians Are Coming, Fiddler on the Roof, Jesus Christ Superstar, Rollerball, F.I.S.T., ...And Justice for All, A Soldier's Story, Moonstruck, The Hurricane
- Dustin Kahia – Call of the Void (2016).
- Alex Kahuam – Forgiveness, Failure!
- Howard Kazanjian – Raiders of the Lost Ark, Return of the Jedi
- Jeffrey Katzenberg – The Prince of Egypt, The Road to El Dorado, Shark Tale
- Buster Keaton – Sherlock Jr., The General, Speak Easily
- Kathleen Kennedy – E.T. the Extra-Terrestrial, Jurassic Park franchise, Back to the Future franchise, The Goonies, Who Framed Roger Rabbit, Schindler's List, Indiana Jones and the Kingdom of the Crystal Skull, Star Wars: The Force Awakens, Rogue One: A Star Wars Story, Star Wars: The Last Jedi, Star Wars: The Rise of Skywalker
- Hans-Hinrich Koch – The Chosen Ones
- Alexander Korda – Things to Come, The Thief of Bagdad, The Third Man
- Josh Koury – Standing by Yourself, Vouyer
- Kristie Macosko Krieger – Bridge of Spies, The BFG, The Post, Ready Player One, The Trial of the Chicago 7, West Side Story (2021 film), The Fabelmans
- Stanley Kubrick – Fear and Desire, Killer's Kiss, Dr. Strangelove, 2001: A Space Odyssey, A Clockwork Orange, Barry Lyndon, The Shining, Full Metal Jacket, Eyes Wide Shut
- Gary Kurtz – Star Wars, The Empire Strikes Back, The Dark Crystal
- Carl Laemmle – The Phantom of the Opera, The Man Who Laughs
- Carl Laemmle Jr. – Dracula, Frankenstein, Bride of Frankenstein
- Dennis Latos – Bardo, Leylak
- Jesse L. Lasky – Sergeant York, The Adventures of Mark Twain
- Jennifer Lee – Ralph Breaks the Internet, Raya and the Last Dragon, Encanto, Strange World
- Mervyn LeRoy – The Wizard of Oz, The Bad Seed
- Val Lewton – Cat People, The Body Snatcher
- Harold Lloyd – Speedy, Movie Crazy, Professor Beware
- Phil Lord and Christopher Miller – Cloudy with a Chance of Meatballs 2, The Lego Batman Movie, The Lego Ninjago Movie, Spider-Man: Into the Spider-Verse, The Lego Movie 2: The Second Part, The Mitchells vs. the Machines, America: The Motion Picture
- Ernst Lubitsch – The Merry Widow, Ninotchka, Heaven Can Wait
- George Lucas – Star Wars, Indiana Jones
- Branko Lustig – Schindler's List, Gladiator
- Joseph L. Mankiewicz – A Christmas Carol, The Philadelphia Story
- Mike Manning – M.F.A., Lost in America, Slapface
- Frank Marshall – The Bourne Identity, The Bourne Supremacy, The Bourne Ultimatum, Back to the Future trilogy, Jurassic Park, The Sixth Sense
- Louis B. Mayer – Greed, Ben-Hur, I Take This Woman
- Rick McCallum – Star Wars
- Shannon McIntosh – Grindhouse, Django Unchained, The Hateful Eight, Once Upon a Time in Hollywood
- Chris Meledandri – Despicable Me, Hop, The Lorax, Despicable Me 2, Minions, The Secret Life of Pets, Sing, Despicable Me 3, The Grinch, The Secret Life of Pets 2
- Arnon Milchan – Pretty Woman, Natural Born Killers, L.A. Confidential, City of Angels, Entrapment, Fight Club, Unfaithful, Daredevil, Mr. & Mrs. Smith, The Fountain, What Happens in Vegas
- Patrick Millsaps – I'll See You in My Dreams
- Walter Mirisch – West Side Story, In the Heat of the Night
- Hayao Miyazaki – Spirited Away, Princess Mononoke, Whisper of the Heart
- Michael Morriatti – Cocaine Bear, Lake George, Wallpaper, Impulse
- Scott Mosier – Clerks, Mallrats, Chasing Amy

== N–Z ==
- Geoffrey Notkin – Radio Free Albemuth, Neil Gaiman: Dream Dangerously, Revenge of Zoe, First to the Moon
- Michael Nozik – Syriana, The Motorcycle Diaries, Quiz Show, The Legend of Bagger Vance, Mississippi Masala
- Christine Oestreicher – A Shocking Accident (Oscar winner)
- Tony Olmos – South of 8, Hemet, or the Landlady Don't Drink Tea
- Alan J. Pakula – To Kill a Mockingbird, Klute, Starting Over
- Nate Parker – Birth Of A Nation (2016),Eden,Portion
- Amy Pascal – Ghostbusters, Spider-Man: Homecoming, Molly's Game, The Post, Venom, Spider-Man: Into the Spider-Verse, Spider-Man: Far From Home, Little Women, Spider-Man: No Way Home
- Tyler Perry – Diary of a Mad Black Woman, Madea's Family Reunion
- Julia Phillips – The Sting, Taxi Driver, Close Encounters of the Third Kind
- Marc Platt – Josie and the Pussycats, Legally Blonde, Wanted, Scott Pilgrim vs. the World, Drive, Into the Woods, Bridge of Spies, The Girl on the Train, La La Land, Mary Poppins Returns, The Trial of the Chicago 7, Cruella, Dear Evan Hansen, Babylon, The Little Mermaid, Wicked, Wicked: For Good, Snow White, How to Train Your Dragon
- Erich Pommer – The Cabinet of Dr. Caligari, Metropolis, The Blue Angel
- Carlo Ponti – Doctor Zhivago, War and Peace, Attila
- Chris Pratt – The Tomorrow War
- Norman Priggen – The Servant, Accident, The Go-Between, The Assassination of Trotsky
- Kori Rae – Monsters University, Onward
- Ramu – AK 47, Lockup Death, Kalasipalya, Ganga
- Steven Rales – Moonrise Kingdom, The Grand Budapest Hotel, Isle of Dogs, The French Dispatch, Asteroid City, The Wonderful Story of Henry Sugar
- Brett Ratner – Double Take, Paid in Full, Santa's Slay, Code Name: The Cleaner, Horrible Bosses, Mirror Mirror, Rules Don't Apply, Georgetown
- Matthew Rhodes – Cherry, Mile 22, The Voices, Shot Caller
- Jonas Rivera – Up, Inside Out, Toy Story 4
- Hal Roach – Sons of the Desert
- Robert Rodriguez – El Mariachi, Desperado, From Dusk till Dawn, Grindhouse
- Win Rosenfeld – BlacKkKlansman, Candyman, Wendell & Wild
- Jane Rosenthal – Wag the Dog, Meet the Parents, The Good Shepherd, The Irishman, Bohemian Rhapsody, The War with Grandpa
- Kerry Rossall – Movin' Too Fast, Friend of the World
- Albert S. Ruddy – The Godfather, Million Dollar Baby, The Longest Yard
- Scott Rudin – No Country for Old Men, School of Rock, The Royal Tenenbaums, Clueless
- Harry Saltzman – James Bond, Battle of Britain, The Ipcress File
- Adam Sandler – The Waterboy, Big Daddy, Little Nicky, The Animal, Mr. Deeds, Eight Crazy Nights, The Hot Chick, Anger Management, 50 First Dates, The Longest Yard, Deuce Bigalow: European Gigolo, Click, Joe Dirt, I Now Pronounce You Chuck and Larry
- Rob Savage – Strings, Host, Dashcam
- Joseph M. Schenck – Our Hospitality, The General
- Jane Schoenbrun – Chained for Life
- Martin Scorsese – The Grifters, Naked in New York, The Aviator
- David O. Selznick – King Kong, Gone with the Wind, Rebecca, The Third Man
- Mack Sennett – Keystone Cops
- Dean Silvers – Flirting with Disaster, Spanking the Monkey, Manny & Lo
- Don Simpson – Beverly Hills Cop, Flashdance, Top Gun
- Mireille Soria – Spirit: Stallion of the Cimarron, Sinbad: Legend of the Seven Seas, Madagascar, Madagascar: Escape 2 Africa, Madagascar 3: Europe's Most Wanted, Home, Captain Underpants: The First Epic Movie
- Clark Spencer – Lilo & Stitch, Meet the Robinsons, Bolt, Winnie the Pooh, Wreck-It Ralph, Zootopia, Ralph Breaks the Internet, Encanto
- Sam Spiegel – The African Queen, The Bridge on the River Kwai, Lawrence of Arabia
- Steven Spielberg – The Goonies, E.T. the Extra-Terrestrial, Poltergeist, Transformers (executive)
- David Sproxton – Chicken Run, Wallace & Gromit: The Curse of the Were-Rabbit, Flushed Away, Arthur Christmas, The Pirates! In an Adventure with Scientists!, Shaun the Sheep Movie, Early Man, A Shaun the Sheep Movie: Farmageddon
- Jefferson Stein – Burros
- Ben Stiller – Blades of Glory, Zoolander, The Ruins, Tropic Thunder
- David Stone – The Boys in the Band, Wicked, Wicked: For Good
- Erich von Stroheim – Blind Husbands, The Wedding March
- Josef von Sternberg – The Docks of New York, The Scarlet Empress
- Gabrielle Tana – Someone Else's America, On the Ropes, The Moth, The Duchess, Coriolanus, The Invisible Woman, Philomena, Run (short), Dancer (Documentary), Mindhorn, Ideal Home, The White Crow, Stan and Ollie, My Zoe
- Quentin Tarantino – From Dusk till Dawn, Hostel, Grindhouse
- Irving Thalberg – Freaks, Grand Hotel, Mutiny on the Bounty
- Emma Thomas – The Dark Knight Trilogy, Man of Steel, Inception, Interstellar, Batman v Superman: Dawn of Justice, Dunkirk, Justice League, Tenet
- Ian Tripp – Everybody Dies by the End, Sincerely Saul
- Walter Wanger – Stagecoach, Joan of Arc, Cleopatra
- Hal B. Wallis – The Maltese Falcon, Casablanca, True Grit
- Fran Walsh – The Lord of the Rings, King Kong, The Lovely Bones, Halo
- Aron Warner – Antz, Shrek, Shrek 2, Shrek the Third, Shrek Forever After, Wish Dragon
- Jack L. Warner – Yankee Doodle Dandy, Casablanca, My Fair Lady
- Robert Watts – Return of the Jedi, Indiana Jones and the Temple of Doom, Indiana Jones and the Last Crusade, You Only Live Twice
- Bob Weinstein – Restoration, Mimic, Reindeer Games, Bad Santa
- Harvey Weinstein – Shakespeare in Love, Gangs of New York, Nine, My Week with Marilyn, Tulip Fever
- Orson Welles – Citizen Kane, The Magnificent Ambersons, The Lady from Shanghai, Touch of Evil
- Michael Williams – Ozland, The Atoning
- Ralph Winter – Star Trek V: The Final Frontier, Star Trek VI: The Undiscovered Country, X-Men, Fantastic Four, X2: X-Men United
- Robert Wise – West Side Story, The Sound of Music, Odds Against Tomorrow, The Sand Pebbles, The Andromeda Strain
- Janet Yang – The Joy Luck Club (film), The People vs. Larry Flynt, Dark Matter (film), Zero Effect, Shanghai Calling
- Ezz El-Dine Zulficar – Among the Ruins, Struggle of the Heroes, Appointment with Life, Appointment with Happiness
- Saul Zaentz – One Flew Over the Cuckoo's Nest, Amadeus, The English Patient
- Darryl F. Zanuck – The Public Enemy, All About Eve, The Longest Day
- Robert Zemeckis – The Frighteners, Matchstick Men, Monster House
- Chloé Zhao – Nomadland, Eternals, Songs My Brothers Taught Me
- Warren Zide – American Pie franchise, Final Destination franchise, Cats & Dogs, The Big Hit, High School
- Adolph Zukor – Dr. Jekyll and Mr. Hyde, Shanghai Express, Souls at Sea
- Salah Zulfikar – The Second Man, My Wife, the Director General, A Taste of Fear, The Other Man, I Want a Solution

== See also ==
- Film director
- Filmmaking
- Lists of film topics
- List of television producers
- Producers Guild of America
