= Merrick McCartha =

American actor

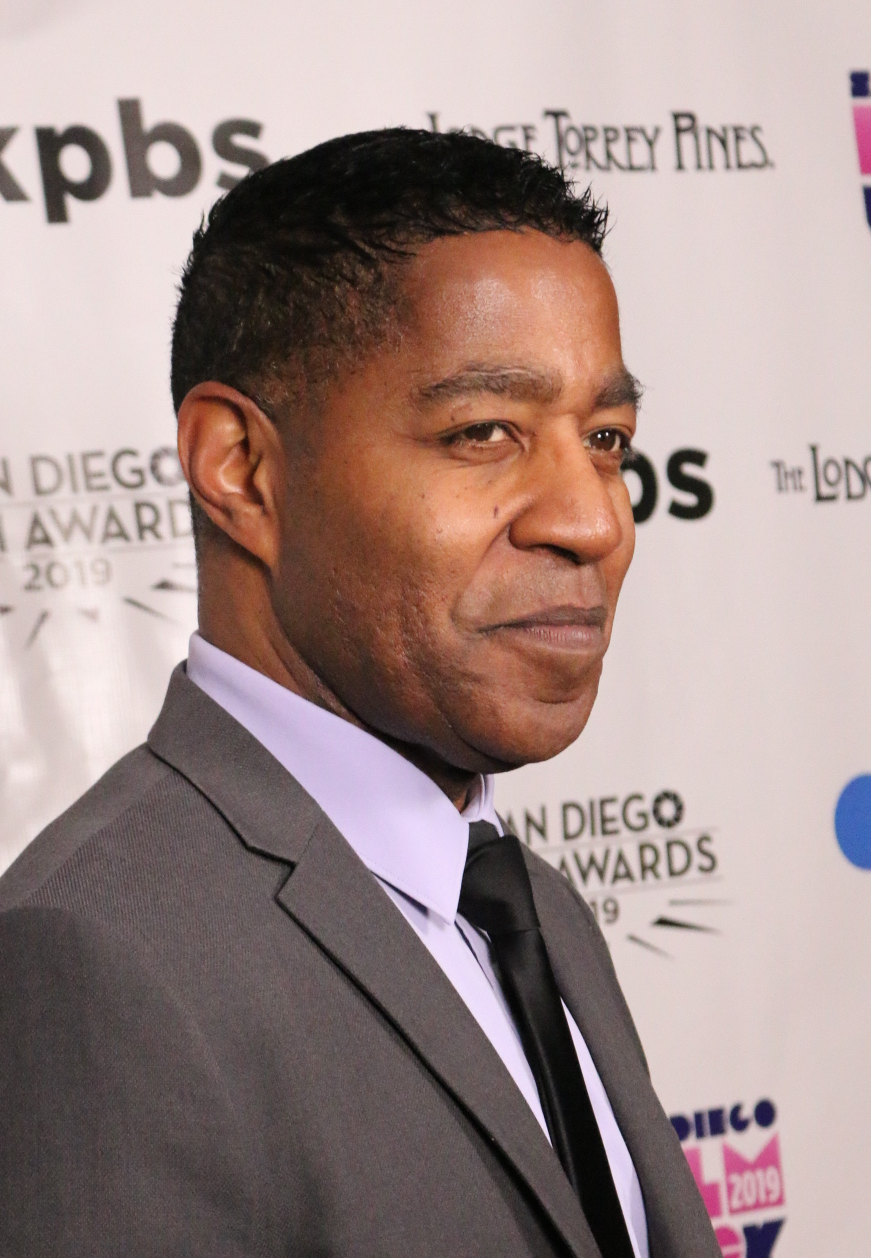
- McCartha in 2019
- Born: Detroit, Michigan, U.S.
- Education: Cass Technical High School; University of Michigan; University of California, San Diego
- Occupation: Actor
- Years active: 2008–present
- Known for: Failure! (2023); Hemet, or the Landlady Don't Drink Tea (2023); If You Should Leave Before Me (2025)
- Notable credits: The Playground (2017); Senior Year (2022)
- Television: All American; Countdown; Criminal Minds; General Hospital; Unstable
- Awards: List of Awards
- Website: merrickmccartha.com

Merrick McCartha is an American actor who appeared on television shows such as All American (2020–2021), Countdown (2025), Criminal Minds (2012–2015), Rebel (2017) and Unstable (2023). His film credits include Failure! (2023), Hemet, or the Landlady Don't Drink Tea (2023), If You Should Leave Before Me (2025), and The Playground (2017).

== Personal life ==
McCartha grew up in Detroit, Michigan. He discovered he had a knack for performance in elementary school but his parents, who were police officers, did not want him to take on acting as a career. In 1990, McCartha was a student and part-time waiter when he helped judge a meatloaf cook-off. He attended Cass Technical High School and pursued an engineering career after college. He later took acting classes and signed with an agency in Los Angeles, California.

== Career ==
In 2011, McCartha was runner-up in a Backstage actors pitch contest that received over 100 submissions. In 2017, he was cast in the San Diego International Fringe Festival and portrayed Deacon Avery Silver in Rebel by producer John Singleton for the BET Network. McCartha was cast in the film Anatomy of an Antihero: Redemption in 2018 and as Robert Hicks in All American in 2021.

In 2023, he became eligible for an Emmy for his role in House of Payne, co-starred with Ted Raimi in Alex Kahuam's crime comedy film Failure! which premiered at FrightFest, and appeared in Tony Olmos' microbudget horror satire film Hemet, or the Landlady Don't Drink Tea.

In 2025, McCartha was cast as the recurring character District Attorney Grayson Valwell in the television show Countdown, and co-starred in the Andersons' debut film If You Should Leave Before Me, which premiered at Raindance Film Festival.

== Filmography ==
Television
| Year | Title | Role | Episodes |
|---|---|---|---|
| 2013 | Scandal | Defense Lobbyist | "Icarus" |
| 2012-2015 | Criminal Minds | Mayor / Anesthesiologist | 2 episodes |
| 2015 | The Young and the Restless | Doctor | |
| 2016 | The Fosters | Angry Dad | "Trust" |
| 2016 | Goliath | Red Emerson | "Pride and Prejudice" |
| 2017 | Rebel | Deacon Avery Silver | "Partners" |
| 2017 | Lethal Weapon | IA Agent #2 | "El Gringo Loco" |
| 2017 | Scorpion | Jeremy Pratt | "Nuke Kids on the Block" |
| 2017 | The Orville | Scientist | "Majority Rule" |
| 2018 | The Bold and the Beautiful | Cop #1 | |
| 2018 | Dear White People | Older Man | "Volume 2: Chapter VII" |
| 2018 | Get Shorty | Detective Torann | "And What Have We Learned?" |
| 2019 | One Day at a Time | Dean | "Ghosts" |
| 2019 | NCIS | Dr. Eugene Pierce | "Perennial" |
| 2019 | This Is Us | Lester | "The Club" |
| 2020 | Brooklyn Nine-Nine | Frank Murwin | "Manhunter" |
| 2020 | General Hospital | Cliff Simpson | 2 episodes |
| 2020 | Broke | Mario Jones | "Jobs" |
| 2020 | Saved by the Bell | Angry Reporter #2 | "Pilot" |
| 2020-2021 | All American | Robert Hicks | 4 episodes |
| 2021 | B Positive | Guy | "Recessive Gina" |
| 2021 | 9-1-1 | Aldous Pate | "Survivors" |
| 2021 | Curb Your Enthusiasm | Cop | "The Five-Foot Fence" |
| 2022 | The Villains of Valley View | Officer Collins | "Trust No One" |
| 2023 | Act Your Age | Marcus | "Fire and Desire" |
| 2023 | As Luck Would Have It | Ken | "Murder 101" |
| 2023 | Unstable | Ted | 2 episodes |
| 2023–2025 | House of Payne | Frederick | 4 episodes |
| 2024 | Grey's Anatomy | Karl | "Walk on the Ocean" |
| 2024 | High Potential | Detective Lavolie | "One of Us" |
| 2025 | Countdown | District Attorney Grayson Valwell | 6 episodes |
| 2025 | Law & Order: Special Victims Unit | Judge Gagan | Episode: "Showdown" |

Feature films
| Year | Title | Role | Notes |
|---|---|---|---|
| 2010 | KingBreaker | Clean Team | |
| 2017 | The Playground | Grandison | |
| 2018 | Anatomy of an Antihero: Redemption | Daniel Brown | Featuring Eric Roberts, Catriona MacColl and Robert Wall |
| 2019 | Borrowed Time | Dr. Daniel Brown | |
| 2020 | Skin: The Movie | Hitchcock | |
| 2020 | Twisted Twin | Detective Fisher | |
| 2022 | Senior Year | Principal Young | |
| 2023 | Failure! | Mr. Serge | |
| 2023 | Hemet, or the Landlady Don't Drink Tea | Martin | |
| 2024 | The Resellers | Roger Martin | |
| 2025 | If You Should Leave Before Me | Lorne | Raindance Film Festival premiere |
| 2025 | Maddie's Secret | Doctor | |

Short films
| Year | Title | Role | Notes |
|---|---|---|---|
| 2008 | Just a Man | Joe Beedle | |
| 2010 | The Heiress Lethal | Johnny Love | selected for 2011 Cannes Film Festival |
| 2011 | What's Your Fantasy? | Unknown | |
| 2014 | The Case of Evil | Deke Williams | |
| 2015 | Things Happen | J.D. | |
| 2021 | Ira Aldridge | Ira Aldridge | also co-writer and executive producer |
| 2023 | The Last Butterflies | Reporter | |
| 2024 | The Risk Rule | Robert Chalk | |
| 2024 | My Superhero Roommate | Mike | |

== Accolades ==
| Event | Year | Film | Award | Result | Ref. |
|---|---|---|---|---|---|
| 48 Hour Film Project | 2008 | Just a Man | Best Ensemble, San Diego | Won | |
| 48 Hour Film Project | 2010 | The Heiress Lethal | Best Ensemble, San Diego | Won | |
| 48 Hour Film Project | 2011 | What's Your Fantasy? | Best Ensemble, San Diego | Won | |
| San Diego Film Awards | 2014 | The Heiress Lethal | Best Actor | Won | |
| San Diego Film Awards | 2016 | Assessing Alan | Best Supporting Actor | Nominated | |
| An Anti-Hero Production Genre Fest | 2015 | The Case of Evil | Best Actor in a Grindhouse Film | Won | |
| Genre Fest | 2015 | The Case of Evil | Best Actor | Won | |
| Zed Fest Film Festival | 2015 | The Case of Evil | Outstanding Acting Performance | Won | |
| Blast Off Film Festival | 2019 | Skin: The Movie | Best Acting Ensemble | Nominated | |
| Idyllwild International Festival of Cinema | 2020 | Skin: The Movie | Best Ensemble | Nominated | |
