= Psycho Therapy =

Psycho Therapy may refer to:

- Psychotherapy, or personal counseling with a psychotherapist
- Psycho Therapy (The Soundtrack), a 2007 hip hop album by Psycho Les of The Beatnuts
- Psycho Therapy: The Shallow Tale of a Writer Who Decided to Write About a Serial Killer, a 2024 film
- "Psycho Therapy", a song on The Ramones' 1983 punk rock album Subterranean Jungle
