= OzLand =

- Release poster for OzLand
- Directed by: Michael Williams
- Written by: Michael Williams
- Produced by: Michael Williams
- Starring: Zack Ratkovich; Glenn Payne
- Cinematography: Michael Williams
- Edited by: Michael Williams
- Music by: Keatzi Gunmoney
- Production company: Shendopen Productions
- Distributed by: Indie Rights
- Release date: September 4, 2014
- Running time: 105 minutes
- Country: United States
- Language: English
- Budget: $10,000 (estimated)

OzLand is a 2014 American science fantasy drama independent film starring Zack Ratkovich and Glenn Payne. It was written and directed by Michael Williams in his feature directorial debut.

The film's story and characters are inspired by and are references to characters and events that appear in L. Frank Baum's 1900 novel The Wonderful Wizard of Oz.

== Plot ==
Two men, Lief (Ratkovich) and Emri (Payne), wander through the fields and abandoned homes of a post-apocalyptic Kansas, searching for food. Lief, the younger of the two and the only one who can read, finds a copy of The Wonderful Wizard of Oz and begins to treat the novel as if it were historical nonfiction, using their surroundings as proof. Leif comes to question whether OzLand is "home" as described by Dorothy Gale, while Emri suggests every day is a journey through "home".

== Cast ==
- Zack Ratkovich as Lief
- Glenn Payne as Emri
- Dunlap Peeples IV as Loi/FM
- Casey Heflin as Dee (voice)

== Production ==
The film was shot entirely on location in Minneola, Kansas and Northern Mississippi.

== Release ==
OzLand held its premiere in Columbus, Mississippi on September 4, 2014, followed by screenings at the Magnolia Independent Film Festival, Oxford Film Festival, Tupelo Film Festival and FestivalSouth Film Expo throughout the following year. It made its theatrical debut in Hollywood on October 16, 2015, followed by its release on internet streaming platforms four days later. It was released to DVD on July 26, 2016. The film made its United Kingdom debut on Flix Premiere on October 4, 2016.

In 2018, the film's distribution rights were reverted to the filmmaker and his company, Shendopen Productions, LLC. At this point, the film was re-released on Amazon Prime in the US and UK, Vimeo on Demand Worldwide, and a limited edition Blu-ray release with hours of bonus features and never-before-released content.

The film returned to select theaters in June 2025 to coincide with the 10th anniversary of its original release and the 125th anniversary of the original publication of The Wonderful Wizard of Oz, with a special screening held at the 48th annual Oz-Stravaganza in Chittenango, New York.

== Critical reception ==
The film received mixed-to-positive reviews, with critics praising the cinematography, music and directing, while a few criticized the writing. Ryan Jay of Premiere Radio Networks wrote a positive review, saying "It’s brilliant! The story is complete and fulfilling; such an impressive accomplishment. The cinematography is extraordinary and meticulous. It’s shot like it was backed by a major studio with a blockbuster budget."

Jacob Medel of Life in LA wrote that "OzLand is rich with detail and powerful character-driven storytelling. Written, produced and directed by Michael Williams, the film is a singular vision that follows Leif and Emri as they travel across a barren wasteland in search of a place to call home."

Katie Walsh of the Los Angeles Times wrote a mixed review, criticizing the writing but praising the cinematography and music, by writing "The bright, saturated cinematography and minimalist guitar-based score by Keatzi Gunmoney are the greatest strengths of OzLand, but they can't overcome the meandering story and stilted dialogue. The movie — directed, written, produced, shot and edited by Michael Williams — takes what could be an interesting concept for a short film and stretches it across 105 minutes. The ideas are not deep enough and the dramatic tension isn't real enough to sustain this feature."

== Awards ==
- Best Feature at Magnolia Independent Film Festival (2015)
- Best Cinematography, Magnolia Independent Film Festival (2015)
- Best of Show, Tupelo Film Festival (2015)
- 1st Place Feature, Tupelo Film Festival (2015)
- Elvin Whitesides Director's Award, Tupelo Film Festival (2015)
- Best Feature Film, Real to Reel Film Festival (2015)
- Best Narrative Feature, Offshoot Film Festival (2015)
- Best Cinematography, FestivalSouth Film Expo (2015)
