= If You Should Leave Before Me =

2025 drama film by the Andersons

- Promotional poster
- Directed by: Boyd Anderson; J. Markus Anderson
- Written by: Boyd Anderson; J. Markus Anderson
- Produced by: Shane P. Allen; Boyd Anderson; J. Markus Anderson; Chris Pegut
- Starring: Shane P. Allen; John Wilcox; Tom Noga; Merrick McCartha; Susan Louise O'Connor
- Cinematography: Dan Watt
- Edited by: Boyd Anderson
- Music by: Troy Higgins
- Production company: Chiefs Over Kings
- Release date: June 21, 2025 (Raindance Film Festival)
- Running time: 116 minutes
- Country: United States
- Language: English

If You Should Leave Before Me is a 2025 drama film written and directed by Boyd and J. Markus Anderson in their feature length directorial debut. The film stars Shane P. Allen, John Wilcox, Tom Noga, Merrick McCartha, and Susan Louise O'Connor.

== Premise ==
To escape grief, a married couple take time to deal with tragedy by interacting with the recently deceased on their way to the afterlife.

== Cast ==
- Shane P. Allen
- John Wilcox
- Tom Noga
- Merrick McCartha
- Susan Louise O'Connor

== Production ==
The film is the Andersons' feature length debut, in which Shane P. Allen starred and produced. The script was written in a month.

== Release ==
The film premiered on June 21, 2025, at Raindance Film Festival.

== Reception ==
On the review aggregator website Rotten Tomatoes, 90% of 10 critics' reviews are positive, with an average rating of 8.0/10.

Morgan Rojas at Cinemacy said that it is "joyfully enriching with the ability to pull on the same emotional heartstrings as episode three of The Last of Us." Romey Norton at Film Focus Online said it "invites audiences to sit with the uncomfortable truths of love and mortality". Cut to the Take called it "one of the most wholesome explorations of grief ever made."

Rich Cline at Shadows on the Wall scored the film 3 out of 5, stating while it "feels rather deliberately offbeat, it's also warm and observant as it explores things that remain unspoken between a middle-aged couple." Darren Gaskell at Warped Perspective said "the pace may occasionally be a tad too leisurely, but The Andersons' uncommon examination of love and loss is frequently charming."

Maryam Philpott at The Reviews Hub scored it 1.5 out of 5, stating it is "ambitious in scope, bleeding beyond its boundaries to explore life and death within a single relationship."
