= The Atoning =

- Release poster
- Directed by: Michael Williams
- Written by: Michael Williams
- Produced by: Michael Williams; Michael LaCour; Joni Seitz
- Starring: Virginia Newcomb; Cannon Bosarge; Michael LaCour; Alex Zuko; Sherri Eakin; Ashlyn Jade Lopez; Jessy Hughes; Bryan Benfield; Kyle Wigginton; Nikki Caruso; Dorothy Weems
- Cinematography: Michael Williams
- Edited by: Michael Williams
- Music by: Keatzi Gunmoney
- Production companies: Shendopen Productions; The Atoning Movie, LLC.
- Distributed by: Gravitas Ventures
- Release dates: September 5, 2017 (United States); February 18, 2017 (Oxford Film Festival); March 4, 2017 (Magnolia Independent Film Festival); April 1, 2017 (Azalea Film Festival); April 22, 2017 (Tupelo Film Festival); September 5, 2017 (DVD)
- Running time: 89 minutes
- Country: United States
- Language: English

The Atoning is a 2017 American independent supernatural horror film written and directed by Michael Williams and starring Virginia Newcomb, Cannon Bosarge and Michael LaCour.

== Premise ==
Vera, Ray, and Sam, a seemingly normal family, are haunted by more than mere ghosts. The lingering horror of their past threatens their ability to function as a loving family until they become enlightened by a virgin ghost who wants Vera.

== Cast ==
- Virginia Newcomb as Vera
- Cannon Bosarge as Sam
- Michael LaCour as Ray
- Alex Zuko as John
- Sherri Eakin as Sara
- Ashlyn Jade Lopez as Julie
- Jessy Hughes as Vanessa
- Bryan Benfield as Momus
- Kyle Wigginton as Zepar
- Nikki Caruso as Asmodeus
- Dorothy Weems as Charon
- Stella Allen as Abby
- Caroline Delatte as Joni
- Chris Bosarge as Uncle Danny
- Todd Barnett as Cody
- Christi Dubois as Mel
- Joni Seitz as Real Estate Agent

== Production ==
The film was shot entirely on location in West Point, Mississippi at the home of co-producer Joni Seitz.

== Release ==
Following a preview screening on February 2, 2017 at Malco Cinema in Columbus, Mississippi, the film premiered at the Oxford Film Festival on February 18, 2017. It screened at the Magnolia Independent Film Festival on March 4, 2017, where it won the Best Home Grown award. It screened and won the Best Feature award at the Azalea Film Festival on April 1, 2017. The film was picked up for distribution by Gravitas Ventures on May 11, 2017. It was released on Blu-ray, DVD and digital download on September 5, 2017.

== Critical reception ==
The film received mixed-to-positive reviews, with critics praising the performances, cinematography, directing and originality. Review aggregator Rotten Tomatoes reports an approval rating of 67%, with an average rating of 6.90/10, based on 6 reviews. Patrick King, in his review for Cultured Ventures, said "The Atoning almost becomes arthouse horror, but there’s enough B-movie sensibilities about the piece for it to appeal to horror fans of all sorts. The movie is ultimately about the secrets we keep buried, those things we don’t want to face, but we must face, if we want to make spiritual progress. Clearly a passion project, The Atoning is a very good indie horror flick that’s definitely worth checking out.

Jennie Kermode of Eye For Film gave the film 3 stars out of 5 and praised Cannon Bosarge's performance, writing "Having less information to work with than his parents, Sam might be expected to be the least interesting character, but Bosarge does a lot with the role and his naturalness helps to give the film an edge that no amount of over-familiar moody lighting can achieve. When his ghostly visions reveal something sinister, it's much easier to feel fear and concern than it is to connect with the consciously remote adults."

Frank Ochieng of Critical Movie Critics commended Michael Williams' use of creativity to bring something new to the horror genre, by saying "Thoroughly engaging, contemplative and percolating with loads of mystique, Williams brings some much needed punch and polish to his low-key goosebumps thriller that legitimately keeps the viewer guessing on their toes. Refreshingly startling in its quieted chaos of eeriness and somber moodiness, The Atoning is surprisingly strategic in its creepy presentation (despite its familiarity in theme), while never falling victim to the overwrought “gotcha moments” seen countless times before in other exaggerated, bloated fright-fests."

Jacqui Blue of Film Inquiry was critical of the film, saying "There’s a leak in the kitchen and a painting that Vera keeps putting away in the attic, which keeps reappearing on the wall. Nothing gets resolved, it just keeps repeating, slowly but surely. It’s always the same day all over again with repetitive actions, with the same mishaps and struggles of not being able to fix what’s broken, things that don’t stay where they’re put, and doors which don’t open."

== Alternate titles ==
Brazil: Segredos Obscuros
Germany: Dämon - Dunkle Vergangenheit
Mexico: Delitos Ocultos
Peru: Apariciones extrañas

== Awards ==
- Best Feature Film, Azalea Film Festival (2017)
- Best Home Grown Film, Magnolia Independent Film Festival (2017)
- 2nd Place for Suspense-Thriller, International Horror Hotel Film Festival (2017)
- Ron Tibbett Award for Best Mississippi Film, Tupelo Film Festival (2017)
- 1st Place Feature Film, Tupelo Film Festival (2017)
- Best Actress (Virginia Newcomb), FestivalSouth Film Expo
- Best Cinematography, FestivalSouth Film Expo
- Best Feature Film, FestivalSouth Film Expo
