= The Remedy (film) =

- Theatrical release poster
- Directed by: Alex Kahuam
- Written by: Daniel Kuhlman
- Produced by: Alex Kahuam; Daniel Kuhlman; Roberta Sparta
- Starring: Timothy Granaderos; London Thor; Doug Jones; Jenny O'Hara; Chris Mulkey
- Cinematography: Diego Cacho
- Edited by: Alex Kahuam
- Music by: Alexander Taylor
- Production companies: Breakwall Pictures; Kahuam Films; Promotora NAE; Sparta Productions
- Release date: June 3, 2026 (SXSW London)
- Running time: 90 minutes
- Country: United States
- Language: English

The Remedy is a 2026 American psychological supernatural horror film directed by Alex Kahuam and written by Daniel Kuhlman.

The film premiered at the SXSW London on June 3, 2026.

== Premise ==
A troubled young man is the caregiver for both his terminally-ill mother and his mentally-ill sister. When he makes a desperate attempt to save his mom, he unleashes a supernatural entity that feeds on human flesh.

== Cast ==
- Timothy Granaderos as Jason
- London Thor as Rachel
- Doug Jones as Leif Johansen
- Jenny O'Hara as Maria
- Chris Mulkey as Uncle Joe

== Production ==
Principal photography wrapped in January 2025, in Los Angeles, California on a psychological supernatural horror film directed by Alex Kahuam and written by Daniel Kuhlman. Timothy Granaderos, London Thor, Doug Jones, Jenny O'Hara, and Chris Mulkey rounded out the cast.

== Release ==
The Remedy premiered at the SXSW London on June 3, 2026.
