= Susan Louise O'Connor =

American stage actress

- Born: Susan Louise O'Connor; Las Cruces, New Mexico, U.S.
- Education: Buchholz High School; University of Florida
- Occupation: Actress
- Years active: 1999–present
- Known for: Blithe Spirit on Broadway
- Notable credits: The Cleaning Lady; If You Should Leave Before Me; Wallflowers
- Awards: 2009 Theatre World Award for Blithe Spirit
- Website: susanlouiseoconnor.com

Susan Louise O'Connor is an American actress who appeared in the series Wallflowers (2013–2014), The Cleaning Lady (2025), and productions of Wonder of the World (2006) and Blithe Spirit (2009) which she received the Dorothy Loudon Starbaby Award, Theatre World Award and was nominated for an Outer Critics Circle Award for Outstanding Featured Actress in a Play.

== Personal life ==
O'Connor was born in Las Cruces, New Mexico. She graduated from Buchholz High School and University of Florida before relocating to New York City.

== Career ==
O'Connor had her Broadway debut in a production of Blithe Spirit, directed by Michael Blakemore and featuring Rupert Everett, Angela Lansbury, Christine Ebersole, and Jayne Atkinson. She later moved to Los Angeles for the production's National Tour.

== Filmography ==
Year	Title	Role	Notes
2013–2014	Wallflowers	Rhonda	10 episodes
2017	American Violence	Dyanna Walternstern	
2020	Runt	Cecily's Mom	
2022	Lexi	Elera	
2025	If You Should Leave Before Me	Lily Boudreaux	
2025	The Cleaning Lady	Greta	5 episodes

== Stage credits ==
Year	Title	Role	Location	Notes
1999	Never Swim Alone	Woman	New York International Fringe Festival	By Daniel MacIvor
2004	What the Butler Saw	Geraldine Barclay	Huntington Theatre, Boston, Massachusetts	
2005	Marion Bridge	Louise	Urban Stages, New York City	
2005	Walk Two Moons	Phoebe Winterbottom	TheatreWorksUSA, New York City	
2006	Wonder of the World	Various	Barrington Stage Company, Pittsfield, Massachusetts	6 roles
2006	Nerve	Susan	14th Street Y Theater, East Village, Manhattan	
2006	The Silent Concerto		14th Street Theater, East Village, Manhattan	By Alejandro Morales
2007	Apostasy	Rachel	Urban Stages, New York City	
2007	Indoor/Outdoor	Samantha	Portland Stage Company, Maine	
2008	What to Do When You Hate All Your Friends	Holly	Lion Theatre, Manhattan, New York	
2009	Children at Play	Morgan Nickelfleck Gladystone	The Living Theatre, New York City	
2009	Blithe Spirit	Edith	Shubert Theatre, Manhattan, New York	
2010	The Vigil or the Guided Cradle		The Brick Theater, Williamsburg, Brooklyn	
2010	The Good Counselor	Evelyn	Premiere Stages, Kean University	
2010	Sylvia	Sylvia	New Theatre Restaurant, Kansas City, Missouri	
2011	God of Carnage	Annette	Robert S. Marx Theatre, Cincinnati, Ohio	Cincinnati Playhouse in the Park
2012	Escape	Wife	La MaMa Experimental Theatre Club	
2012	The Why Overhead	Annie	Access Theater, New York	
2012	Hearts Like Fists	Nurse	The Secret Theatre, Queens, New York	
2012	Getting the Business	Patricia	Clurman Theater, New York City	
2013	Why We Left Brooklyn	Michelle	Fourth Street Theater, East Village, Manhattan	
2013	Bodega Bay	Louise	Abingdon Theater, New York	
2014	Blithe Spirit	Edith	Ahmanson Theatre, Los Angeles, California	
2015	Blithe Spirit	Edith	Golden Gate Theatre, San Francisco, CA	
2015	Blithe Spirit	Edith	National Theatre, Washington, D.C.	
2017	Heisenberg	Georgie	The Repertory Theatre of St. Louis	
2017	Do You See?	Violet	Atwater Village Theatre, Los Angeles, California	

== Accolades ==
Event	Year	Title	Award	Result	Ref.
Theatre World	2009	Blithe Spirit	Dorothy Loudon Starbaby Award	Won	
Theatre World	2009	Blithe Spirit	Theatre World Award	Won	
Outer Critics Circle Awards	2009	Blithe Spirit	Outstanding Featured Actress in a Play	Nominated	
