= Mustafa Kaymak =

Turkish playwright, screenwriter, producer

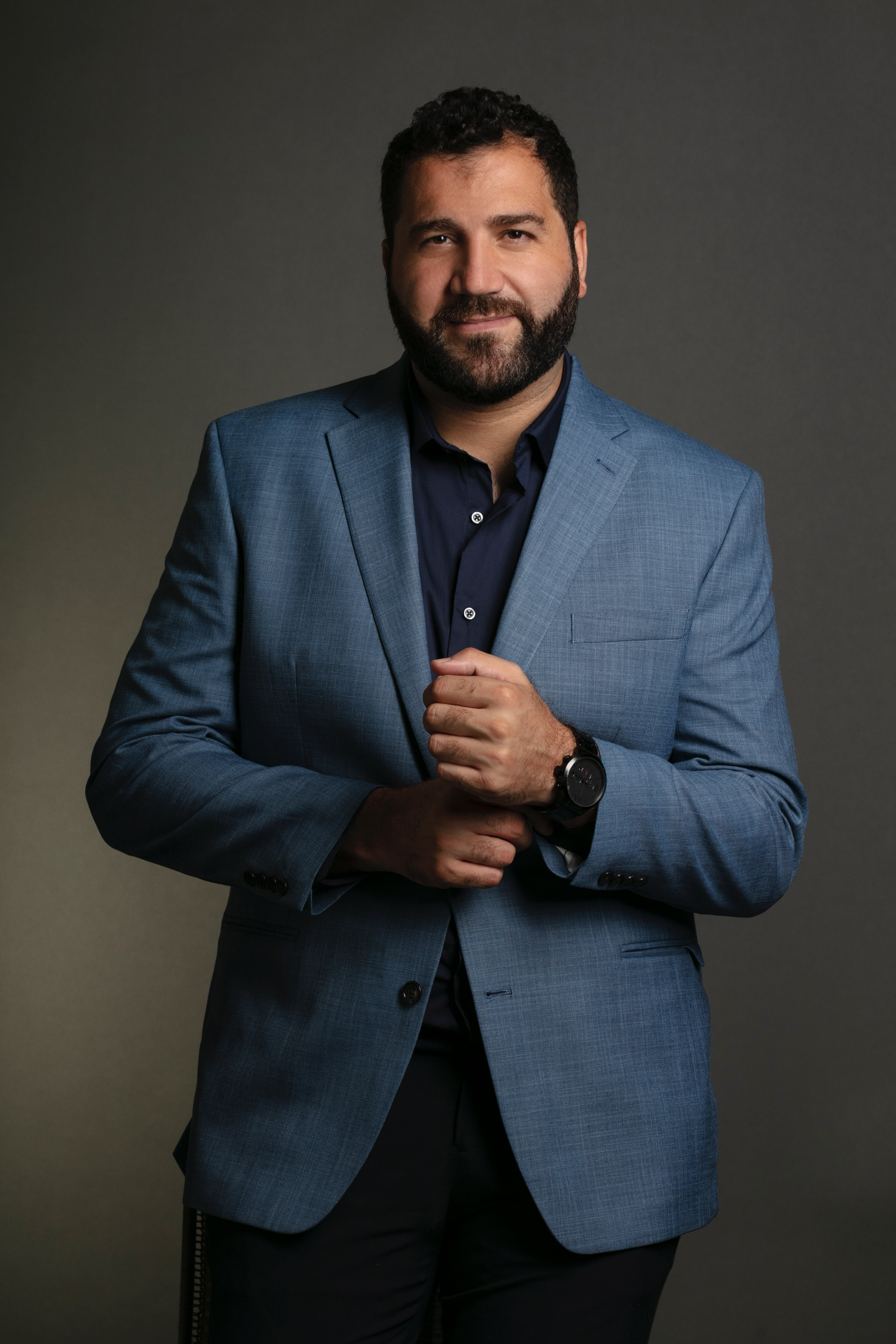
- Born: July 24, 1984 (age 42); Ankara, Turkey
- Citizenship: Turkey and USA
- Education: Columbia University Ankara University
- Occupations: Co-Founder & CEO of Cinegryphon Entertainment
- Years active: 2017 - present
- Employer: Cinegryphon (co-founder)
- Known for: Leylak
- Notable work: Green

Mustafa Kaymak (born July 24, 1984) is a Turkish playwright, screenwriter and film producer of Kurdish ethnicity based in the United States.

== Early life ==
Mustafa Kaymak is the Co-Founder of Cinegryphon Entertainment, an American independent entertainment company specializing in film and television development, production and financing. He is a Sundance (Green-2019) and Tribeca (Leylak-2021) award winning writer and producer. He was born in Ankara Turkey, where he received a BA degree in journalism (2008 Ankara University). He holds two MFA degrees, one in Playwriting and another in Creative Film Producing, both from Columbia University. Recently he was awarded the Caucus Foundation & Annenberg Foundation Award.

== Career ==
Mustafa Kaymak is a Turkish playwright and film producer of Kurdish origin, based in the United States. He was born in Ankara, Turkey on July 24, 1984. After graduating from Ankara University’s Communication Faculty with a Journalism Degree 2008, Kaymak immigrated to Alaska and began studying English. While at Prince William Sound Community College, in beautiful Valdez AK, he fell in love with theater and decided to pursue a master's degree. In 2011, Kaymak moved to New York City to begin his MFA in Playwriting at Columbia University.

Upon finishing his degree, he began his second MFA in Creative Film Producing, also at Columbia. Kaymak’s thesis film "Green" won the Short Film Jury Award at Sundance Film Festival 2019. Much of Mustafa's inspiration comes from spending every summer in the small village of Altilar, Konya. It was settled by his ancestors and Mustafa spent many happy hours playing with his extensive extended family in the orchard and garden. He tended sheep with the shepherds and helped on his grandpa's farm harvesting cumin. He loved the Anatolian sheep dogs, of which the village had many. His father suffered from MS and died when Mustafa was nine years old. His mother, Zeliha Kaymak, continued to raise him and his four older siblings in Ankara, where they spent the winters.

After working on various projects as writer and producer, Kaymak co-founded the entertainment production company based in New York City, Cinegryphon Entertainment, with Scott Aharoni and Sinan Eczacibasi in September 2021. He is currently involved in several projects under the banner of Cinegryphon Entertainment, including a feature narrative, The Shallow Tale of a Writer Who Decided to Write about a Serial Killer by writer/director Tolga Karaçelik, a feature-length adaptation of the Sundance Winning short film Green, and a documentary called The Walk by Oscar Nominee Tamara Kotevska.

The production house is also planning to produce a feature adaptation of the classic novel, The Blue Castle, by Lucy Maud Montgomery.

== Filmography ==
=== As writer ===
==== Film ====
Year	Title	Director	Producer	Editor	Writer	Notes
2019	Green	No	Yes	No	Yes	Short film
2021	Leylak	No	Yes	No	Yes	Short film
