= Wallflowers (web series) =

- Genre: Comedy
- Created by: Kieran Turner
- Starring: Patch Darragh; Sarah Saltzberg; Gibson Frazier; Christianne Tisdale; Jolly Abraham; Susan Louise O'Connor; Max Crumm; Marcia DeBonis
- Composers: Stephen Webster; Mike Errico; Will Taylor (songs Season 2)
- Country of origin: United States
- Original language: English
- No. of seasons: 2
- No. of episodes: 12

Production
- Producers: Kieran Turner, Nick Brennan, Michael Canzoniero (Season 1), Kieran Turner, Nick Brennan, Christianne Tisdale, Michael Canzoniero, Stage17 (Season 2)
- Production location: New York City
- Running time: 15-20 minutes

Original release
- Network: Stage17.tv, Dekkoo
- Release: March 20, 2013 – June 5, 2014

Wallflowers is an American comedy web series created and written by Kieran Turner. The series is broadcast on the internet and premiered on March 20, 2013 and ran for two seasons. The show was distributed independently on the internet before being streamed on Stage17.tv, and later Dekkoo.

== Premise ==
Four friends in New York City belong to a support group of adults who struggle with dating. The core group of characters are in their mid to late 30s and are from the last generation of people who did not come of age using the internet as a dating tool. The characters find themselves single and not very successful at getting dates.

== Characters ==
=== Main Cast ===
Bryce Hunter (Patch Darragh): A former child star turned casting director. Openly gay, Bryce is acerbic, closed off and wary of trusting people. He drinks and smokes to excess.

Daisy Loeb (Sarah Saltzberg): Bryce's best friend and partner at Hunter Casting. She works hard to balance her romantic tendencies with her no-nonsense outlook on life.

Martin Parrish (Gibson Frazier): Nearing 40, Martin is looking for the right woman to settle down with, marry and start a family. Unfortunately, his eagerness to do so rarely gets him a second date.

Janice Ackerman (Christianne Tisdale): A former back-up singer for many defunct bands no one remembers, Janice now dispenses relationship advice at a weekly meeting in NYC. She gives her all of herself to followers, whether they like it or not.

Jane Tavana (Jolly Abraham): The prodigal group member, now returned after being fired from her job as a high powered attorney and ending an affair with her married boss. Jane refuses to be caught in anything she can't get out of, to the point of self-sabotage.

Rhonda (Susan Louise O'Connor): Optimistic, romantic, loving, and a doormat, Rhonda refuses to see the negative in anything.

Linus (Max Crumm): Linus is the newest member of the group. A bartender and aspiring comic book artist, he's terribly inept at dating and has no clue just how attractive he is.

Victoria Pond (Angela Lin): Angry, defensive and devastatingly hilarious, Victoria was raised in a culture where women were seen to be subservient, and has fought against that her entire life. She surrounds herself with gay men and makes it very difficult to let anyone else in, for fear of losing her identity. (Season One only)

=== Recurring ===
Leslie (Marcia DeBonis): Office manager at Hunter Casting and the real muscle behind the team.

Becca (Jillian Louis): Casting assistant and rival of Daisy's for pretty much everything.

Wade (Daniel Abeles): New receptionist at Hunter Casting.

Alex (John Halbach): Musician who begins dating Bryce in Season Two.

Fred (Robert Bogue): Janice's ex-husband. A band manager and ne'er-do-well who begins dating Jane.

Tina (Tina Hart): Support group member

Ricky (Ricky Dunlop): Support group member

Todd (Gideon Glick): Receptionist at Hunter Casting and thorn in Bryce's side. He's fired from the agency at the beginning of Season Two. (Season One only)

Charlie (Matt Dengler): Daisy's younger brother who harbors a secret crush on Bryce. (Season One only)

Mark (Wayne Wilcox): Filmmaker and client of Hunter Casting. He and Daisy are infatuated with one another. Though Mark is a large presence in Season 2, he only appears as a hazy profile on a computer screen or is heard as a voice over the phone. This was due to actor Wayne Wilcox's unavailability during shooting. Actor Mark Provencher stepped in to do the brief bits in Season 2.

=== Notable Guests ===
Troy (Charlie Williams): Aspiring actor, boyfriend of Todd, and the worst casting reader on the face of the earth. (Season One)

Nancy (Lisa Joyce): Martin's pregnant co-worker, with whom he strikes up a friendship after volunteering to accompany her Lamaze classes. (Season Two)

Greg (Bryce Pinkham): Nancy's husband, a stand-up comedian on the road. (Season Two)

Dan Randall (Richard Gallagher): A filmmaker who offers Bryce a shot at a comeback. (Season 2)

== Production ==
Wallflowers was created and written by director-producer Kieran Turner, a graduate of the Tisch School of the Arts. Season One of Wallflowers was financed by Turner himself and released in April 2013 on Blip.tv and YouTube. The show was subsequently picked up for a fully funded 2nd season by online digital platform Stage17, which specialized in programming by the Broadway community (many of the cast of Wallflowers are working Broadway/theater actors). Season Two launched on April 3, 2014, three days after the launch of Stage17 itself.

Several cast changes had been implemented during the show's brief run. The character of Bryce Hunter was recast twice. Originally played by Tony nominee Chad Kimball, who was unable to continue with the series past Episode 3 of Season 1, the role was recast with actor Lucas Near-Verbrugghe. To introduce the switch, the show filmed a short piece which was a parody of the Steven Carrington/Dynasty actor swap, with the cast of Wallflowers gathered in a hospital room, awaiting Bryce's head bandages to be removed. Near-Verbrugghe relocated to Los Angeles at the end of Season 1, so the role was once again recast, this time with actor Patch Darragh, who filmed all of Season 2 and is the current Bryce Hunter.

In between seasons, the cast shot a series of "minisodes" in order to keep up viewer interest. There were seven "video dating" segments, each featuring a different cast member, and five installments of a new segment called "Ask Janice," an advice vlog by the show's resident relationship guru, Janice Ackerman. In an interview Turner stated where the inspiration came from for the series, "I became very excited by some of the newer web series I was seeing that were longer in format, were well-written, acted and directed and felt like actual TV shows. And any time I can find a forum to portray the kinds of characters I want to see that aren’t getting done elsewhere, I jump at it."

== Season 1 ==
- Episode 1: Square Pegs - Pilot. Meet Bryce, Daisy, Martin & Victoria, four singles whose love lives aren't just lackluster, they're disastrous.
- Episode 2: Fridays - See how wallflowers spend their Friday nights.
- Episode 3: All-American Girl - Daisy overdoes it on her first day working with Mark and finds competition for his attention from both Becca and Bryce.
- Episode 4: Hello, Larry - Janice sets Bryce up on a blind date.
- Episode 5: The Partridge Family- The gang spend a boozy, smoky afternoon at Bryce's letting down their hair and getting real.

== Season 2 ==
- Episode 1: The Invaders- Daisy and Mark have finally begun dating (albeit long distance), Martin volunteers to help his pregnant co-worker during Lamaze classes, newcomer Jane is set up with Janice's ex-husband, and Bryce catches the eye of a sexy musician.
- Episode 2: The Match Game- The Group welcomes a new member. Bryce and Alex go on a date. Jane reluctantly takes Janice’s advice and begins spending time with Fred.
- Episode 3: Super Friends- Janice questions the group’s individual support systems when Daisy is criticized for her long distance relationship with Mark. Martin offers to help Nancy around the house, and Bryce hires a new assistant.
- Episode 4: Misfits of Science- Janice discovers the joys of internet dating and forces the group to participate. Bryce signs up for the gay dating app “trickr,” Rhonda goes on a blind date, and problems develop between the partners at Hunter Casting when a filmmaker comes to Bryce with a surprising offer.
- Episode 5: "V"- Daisy goes to Janice for advice about Mark. Martin and Nancy grow closer while Bryce and Jane get cold feet and Linus gets an offer he has to refuse.
- Episode 6: My Own Worst Enemy- Jealousy is the topic of this week’s meeting. Tension rises between Janice and Bryce over Alex. Martin looks for the perfect gift for Nancy’s baby, but meets her husband, instead. Mark comes home, but what will it mean for Daisy?
- Episode 7: Roar- Daisy deals with the fallout from Mark’s return. Janice and Fred reveal some startling information about their relationship. Bryce comes to a decision. The group bands together to come to the aid of a friend in need.

== Awards/nominations ==
Season One:

- Independent Series Awards
  - Best Ensemble Cast- Comedy (Nominated)
  - Best Supporting Actor- Comedy: Gibson Frazier (Nominated)

Season Two:

- ITVFest
  - Best Series- Comedy (Nominated)
- Snobby Robot Magazine Web Awards
  - Best Series (Nominated)
  - Best Actor: Patch Darragh (WINNER)
  - Best Actress: Sarah Saltzberg (Nominated)
  - Best Ensemble Cast (Nominated)
  - Best Director: Kieran Turner (Nominated)
  - Best Drama Screenplay: Kieran Turner (WINNER)
  - Best Cinematography: Zachary Halberd (Nominated)
  - Best Editing: Danny Bresnik (WINNER)
  - Best Music & Sound: Stephen Webster, Mike Errico, Will Taylor, Joel Raabe (Nominated)
- Vancouver Web Fest
  - Best Comedy Series (Nominated)
  - Best Director: Kieran Turner (Nominated)
  - Best Screenplay: Kieran Turner (Nominated)
- Independent Series Awards
  - Best Series- Comedy (Nominated)
  - Best Writing- Comedy: Kieran Turner (Nominated)
  - Best Supporting Actor- Comedy: Gibson Frazier (Nominated)
  - Best Supporting Actress- Comedy: Susan Louise O'Connor (Nominated)
  - Best Guest Actor- Comedy: Robert Bogue (Nominated)
  - Best Guest Actor- Comedy: John Halbach (Nominated)
  - Best Soundtrack: Kieran Turner, Mike Turner (WINNER)

== Release ==
While the show was originally available exclusively on Stage17.tv, the series was later picked up by Gaius Media's streaming network Dekkoo. Dekkoo released the entire series on DVD through TLA Video. The DVD special edition includes all episodes, minisodes and commentary by creator Kieran Turner and members of the Wallflowers cast.
