= Failure! =

2023 film by Alex Kahuam

- Theatrical release poster
- Directed by: Alex Kahuam
- Written by: Alex Kahuam
- Produced by: Marco De Molina; Kayli Fortun; Alex Kahuam; Ted Raimi; Jose D. Rodriguez
- Starring: Ted Raimi; Merrick McCartha; Noel Douglas Orput; Melissa Diaz; Christin Muuli; Daniel Kuhlman; LeVar Michael; Spencer Langston; John Paul Medrano; Ernest Cavazos; Joe Barra; Chris Paul Morales; Alex Sands; Hyeong Choi
- Cinematography: Ernesto Lomeli
- Edited by: Alex Kahuam
- Music by: Vincent Gillioz
- Production companies: Promotora NAE; Spacebrain Entertainment
- Distributed by: Red Water Entertainment
- Release dates: August 28, 2023 (FrightFest); January 28, 2025 (VOD)
- Running time: 87 minutes
- Countries: Mexico; United States
- Language: English

Failure! is a 2023 crime comedy film written and directed by Alex Kahuam. The film stars Ted Raimi, Merrick McCartha, Noel Douglas Orput, Melissa Diaz and Christin Muuli.

== Plot ==
Within one hour, a businessman must choose between his finances or murder to keep his family safe.

== Cast ==
- Ted Raimi as James
- Merrick McCartha as Mr. Serge
- Noel Douglas Orput as Unknown Man
- Melissa Diaz as Maria
- Christin Muuli as Jessica
- Daniel Kuhlman as Alvar
- LeVar Michael as Robert
- Spencer Langston as JP. Jr.
- John Paul Medrano as Michael
- Ernest Cavazos as Slavko
- Joe Barra as Nicolas
- Chris Paul Morales as Juan
- Alex Sands as Charles
- Hyeong Choi as Takuma

== Production ==
The film was shot in a single 87-minute take. Raimi said that principal photography took three days from rehearsal to final take. The film makes Kahuam the first Mexican filmmaker to make a one shot feature film in the US.

== Release ==
The film was picked up for distribution by Alief at Marché du Film and premiered at FrightFest on August 28, 2023. In May 2024, Red Water Entertainment acquired the North American distribution rights. It was released on video on demand on January 28, 2025.

== Reception ==
On the review aggregator website Rotten Tomatoes, 71% of 7 critics' reviews are positive, with an average rating of 7.7/10/10.

Martin Unsworth at Starburst Magazine scored the film 5 out of 5. Paul Chapinal at Film News gave it 4 out of 5 stars. Film critic Kim Newman said the film is more satisfying than Kahuam's Forgiveness. Anton Bitel at Projected Figures said it is "an understated, if unpredictable chamber drama" that "is concerned with broader themes of American capital and criminality."

Horror icon and frequent Raimi collaborator Bruce Campbell endorsed the film by saying "Ted Raimi is one of the few actors I would — or could — watch for 87 minutes without a break."
