= The Playground (film) =

2017 film by Edreace Purmul

- Poster
- Directed by: Edreace Purmul
- Written by: Edreace Purmul; Ramona Frye; Dean Mounir
- Produced by: Edreace Purmul; Bart Cameron; Marisa Ditimus; Rayma Kendra Kulik; Chad Littlepage; Raj Milian; Rebecca Reyes
- Starring: Myles Cranford; Merrick McCartha; Shane P. Allen; Christopher Salazar; Ghadir Mounib; Raye Richards; Daniel Armand; Lawrence R. Kivett; Kysha Hobbs; Evan Henderson; Jennifer Paredes
- Cinematography: Roger Sogues
- Music by: Sami Matar
- Production company: SplitWorld Pictures
- Distributed by: Indie Rights
- Release date: October 21, 2017 (VOD)
- Running time: 151 minutes
- Country: USA
- Language: English

The Playground is a 2017 American thriller film directed by Edreace Purmul. The film was written by Purmul, Ramona Frye and Dean Mounir. It stars Myles Cranford, Merrick McCartha, Shane P. Allen, Christopher Salazar and Ghadir Mounib. The film won Best Narrative Feature at the San Diego Film Awards and was distributed by Indie Rights.

== Plot ==
The story follows Joseph, Grandison, Jack, Jill and Mr. Vaugn. Joseph is a priest grappling with his morals. Grandison is an eager bum down on his luck. Jack is a convict, married to Jill, his frustrated wife. Mr. Vaugn is a business man whose fortune is slipping away. They all struggle against their inner demons while crossing paths in a fable orchestrated by a dark entity.

== Cast ==
- Myles Cranford as Old Homeless Man
- Merrick McCartha as Grandison
- Shane P. Allen as Mr. Vaugn
- Christopher Salazar as Joseph
- Ghadir Mounib as Jill
- Raye Richards as Hairdresser Coworker
- Daniel Armand as Nameless Man
- Lawrence R. Kivett as Jack
- Kysha Hobbs as Shaman
- Evan Henderson as Accountant
- Jennifer Paredes as Auto Mechanic Clerk

== Production ==
Purmul began writing the script in 2013, inspired by questions around mass shootings in America. He created his own version of the Devil based on archetypes from ancient fables and integrated it into the characters.

The cast is mostly made up of San Diego–based actors. The film plays out like an anthology, observing five separate stories. Purmul says his elevator pitch for the film is Pulp Fiction meets The Devil's Advocate.

== Release ==
The film released on October 21, 2017. It was distributed by Indie Rights.

== Reception ==
=== Critical response ===
Richard Propes of The Independent Critic says that Purmul has "crafted a film of tremendous vision and intentionality," scoring it 3 out of 4. Don Shanahan at Every Movie Has a Lesson admits "it is a film to respect more than enjoy" scoring the film 3 out of 5 stars. Shirley Rodriguez at Independent Film Now said "the true playground we discover is the world itself and its inhabitants."

=== Accolades ===
The film won Best Narrative Feature Film at the San Diego Film Awards in 2016.
