= Ted Raimi =

American actor (born 1965)

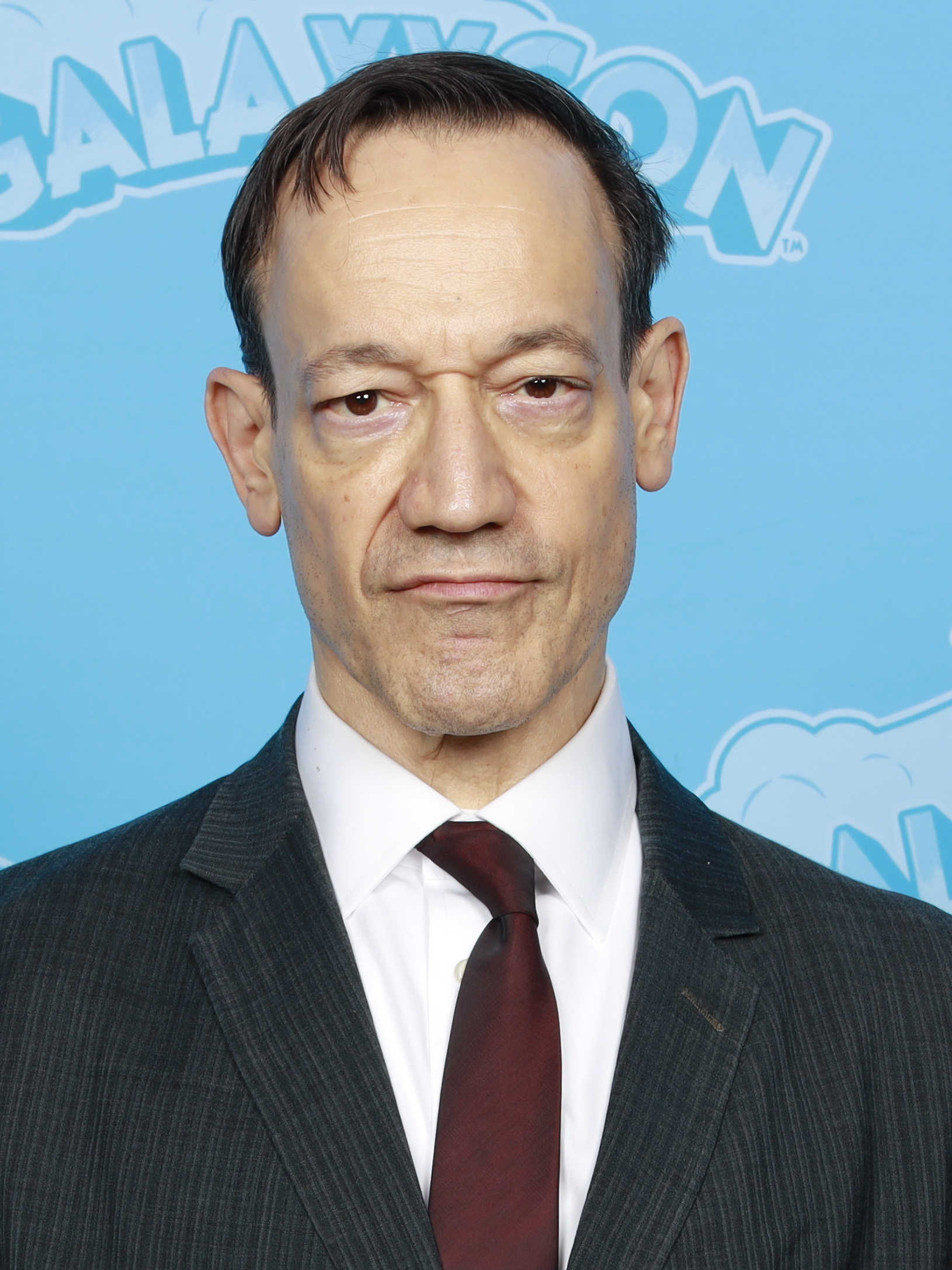
- Raimi at GalaxyCon Raleigh in 2024
- Born: December 14, 1965 (age 60); Detroit, Michigan, U.S.
- Education: University of Michigan
- Occupations: Actor; director; screenwriter
- Years active: 1977–present
- Relatives: Sam Raimi (brother); Ivan Raimi (brother)

Theodore Raimi (born December 14, 1965) is an American character actor, director and writer. He is known for his roles in the works of his brother Sam Raimi, including a fake Shemp in The Evil Dead, possessed Henrietta in Evil Dead II, and Ted Hoffman in the Spider-Man trilogy. He later reprised his role as Henrietta in the television series Ash vs. Evil Dead, in which he also played the character Chet Kaminski. He is also known for his roles as Lieutenant JG Tim O'Neill in seaQuest DSV, the merchant in Legend of the Seeker, and Joxer the Mighty in both Xena: Warrior Princess and Hercules: The Legendary Journeys.

Raimi has appeared in minor roles in the films Crimewave, Intruder, Shocker, Darkman, Candyman, Army of Darkness, Clear and Present Danger, The Grudge, Drag Me to Hell, and Oz the Great and Powerful, as well as the television series ALF, Twin Peaks, Baywatch, and Supernatural. He has had voice roles in the television series Invader Zim and Code Monkeys, and in the video games Evil Dead: Regeneration and The Quarry.

== Early life ==
Raimi was born to a Jewish family in Detroit, Michigan. His parents are Celia (née Abrams), a lingerie store proprietor, and Leonard Raimi, a furniture store proprietor. Ted was raised in Conservative Judaism, and his ancestors immigrated from Russia and Hungary. He attended Wylie E. Groves High School in Beverly Hills, Michigan, where he played blues harp and was a DJ and a member of the Groves Cinema Society. At seventeen, Raimi began his professional acting career doing industrial films in Detroit, for Ford, General Motors and Chrysler. He attended University of Michigan, New York University, then finally University of Detroit. Raimi's older brothers are director Sam Raimi and screenwriter Ivan Raimi.

== Career ==
Raimi's motion picture acting credits include: Wes Craven's Shocker, Born Yesterday, Patriot Games, Clear and Present Danger, The Evil Dead, Evil Dead II, Army of Darkness, Darkman, and the Spider-Man series, as well as roles in such features as: Stuart Saves His Family, The Grudge, Midnight Meat Train, and Oz the Great and Powerful.

On television, he has been seen on shows such as Twin Peaks, CSI: NY, Supernatural, and Legend of the Seeker, but is best known for his roles as the communication officer Lt. Tim O'Neill on the science-fiction television series seaQuest DSV (later seaQuest 2032) and starring as the warrior aspirant Joxer on Xena: Warrior Princess.

Raimi wrote the original "Joxer the Mighty" song with help from director Josh Becker for Xena: Warrior Princess. In 2022, he joined director Alex Kahuam for his upcoming feature film Failure!, which was shot entirely in a single long-take.

== Selected filmography ==
=== Film ===
Year	Title	Role	Notes	Ref(s)
1978	It's Murder!	Bradley		
1981	The Evil Dead	Fake Shemp		
1981	Torro. Torro. Torro!		Short film	
1982	Cleveland Smith: Bounty Hunter		Short film	
1985	Crimewave	Waiter		
1985	Thou Shalt Not Kill... Except	Chain Man		
1987	Evil Dead II	Possessed Henrietta		
1987	Blood Rage	Condom Salesman		
1989	Intruder	Joe 'Produce Joe'		
1989	Easy Wheels	Charlie		
1989	Shocker	"Pac-Man"		
1990	Darkman	Rick Anderson		
1991	Lunatics: A Love Story	Hank Stone		
1992	Eddie Presley	"Scooter"		
1992	Patriot Games	CIA Technician		
1992	Candyman	Billy		
1992	Army of Darkness	Cowardly Warrior / Swordsmith / Villager / S-Mart Clerk	Credited as "Theodore Raimi"; uncredited for roles besides "Cowardly Warrior"	
1992	Inside Out V	Richard	Direct-to-video	
1992	The Finishing Touch	Detective Arnold		
1992	The Fountain Clowns	Hayden		
1992	Maniac Cop III: Badge of Silence	Reporter		
1993	Born Yesterday	Cynthia's Assistant		
1993	Skinner	Dennis Skinner		
1993	Hard Target	Man On The Street		
1994	Floundering	Safe Salesman		
1994	Clear and Present Danger	Satellite Analyst		
1994	In This Corner	Interviewer		
1995	Stuart Saves His Family	Hal		
1995	The Expert	Jerry's Friend	Uncredited	
1996	The Shot	Detective Corelli		
1997	Wishmaster	Ed Finney		
1998	Hercules and Xena – The Animated Movie: The Battle for Mount Olympus	Crius	Voice; direct-to-video film	
1999	Freak Talks About Sex	Jackie's Husband		
2001	The Attic Expeditions	Dr. Coffee		
2002	Spider-Man	Ted Hoffman		
2003	Red Zone	Phelps		
2003	Between the Sheets	Gabriel / A.D.R. Mixer		
2004	Spider-Man 2	Ted Hoffman		
2004	Illusion	Ian		
2004	The Grudge	Alex Jones		
2005	Man with the Screaming Brain	Pavel		
2005	Freezerburn	Special Agent Johnson		
2006	High Hopes	Special Agent Brown		
2006	Kalamazoo?	Angel		
2007	Reign Over Me	Peter Saravino		
2007	My Name Is Bruce	Mills Toddner / Wing / Sign Painter		
2007	Spider-Man 3	Ted Hoffman		
2007	Millennium Crisis	August		
2008	Diamonds and Guns	The Landlord		
2008	The Midnight Meat Train	Randle Cooper		
2009	Drag Me to Hell	Doctor		
2010	VideoDome Rent-O-Rama	Francis	Short film	
2011	Ruthless: An Experiment in Terror	Bartender		
2012	Attack of the 50 Foot Cheerleader	Dr. Higgs		
2013	Oz the Great and Powerful	Skeptic In Audience		
2014	Murder of a Cat	Young Sheriff		
2017	Darkness Rising	Dad		
2021	18½	Alexander Haig	Voice	
2023	Failure!	James		
2023	Dante’s Hotel	Mr. Emitt		
2026	Ernie and Emma	Persnickety Dance Instructor		
TBA	The Observance †	Richard Abernathy	Post-production	

=== Television ===
Year	Title	Role	Notes	Ref(s)
1989	Knight & Daye	Buyer	Episode: "Stalk Radio"	
1989	Alien Nation	Johnny Appleseed	Episode: "Chains of Love"	
1989	ALF	Julius	Episode: "It's My Party"	
1991	Twin Peaks	Heavy Metal Youth	Episodes: "2.19", "2.20"	
1992	Baywatch	Leonard	Episode: "Rookie of the Year"	
1993–1996	seaQuest DSV	Lieutenant j.g. Timothy O'Neill	Main role (54 episodes)	
1996	American Gothic	Ted Parker	Episode: "Learning to Crawl"	
1996	Apollo 11	Steve Bales	Television film	
1996–2001	Xena: Warrior Princess	Joxer	Recurring role (42 episodes)	
1997	Hercules: The Legendary Journeys	Joxer	Episodes: "When a Man Loves a Woman", "Stranger in a Strange World"	
1998	Hercules: The Legendary Journeys	Alex Kurtzman	Episode: "Yes, Virginia, There Is a Hercules"	
1999	Iggy Vile M.D.	Frederick Marsche	Television film	
2001	Primetime Glick	Various roles		
2002	Invader Zim	Skoodge, Holographic Alien Head	Voice roles Episodes: "Battle of the Planets", "HOBO 13/Walk for Your Lives"	
2002	Odyssey 5	Harry Mudd	Episode: "Trouble with Harry"	
2005	CSI: NY	Garage Joe / Joe Strahil	Episode: "Hush"	
2006	Masters of Horror	Father Tulli	Episode: "The Damned Thing"	
2007	Planet Raptor	Dr. Tygon	Television film	
2007–2008	Code Monkeys	Various roles	Recurring voice roles (6 episodes)	
2008	Legend of the Seeker	Sebastian	Episode: "Bounty"	
2008	30 Days of Night: Dust to Dust		Television miniseries	
2008	Supernatural	Wesley Mondale	Episode: "Wishful Thinking"	
2009	Angel of Death	Jed Norton	Web series	
2010	Legend of the Seeker	Sebastian	Episode: "Hunger"	
2011	Your Dungeon, My Dragon		Episode: "Battle of the Bands, Man"	
2016	Ash vs Evil Dead	Possessed Henrietta	Also played Possessed Henrietta in Evil Dead II	
2018	Ash vs Evil Dead	Chet Kaminski	Recurring role (6 episodes)	
2017	Buddy Thunderstruck	Darnell / Moneybags	Voice role; 12 episodes	
2021	Creepshow	Ted	Episode: "Public Television Of The Dead"	

=== Video games ===
Year	Title	Role	Notes	Ref(s)
2005	Evil Dead: Regeneration	Sam	Voice role	
2022	The Quarry	Travis Hackett	Voice, motion capture and likeness	

=== Non-acting work ===
Year	Title	Role	Notes	Ref(s)
1978	Within the Woods	Crew	Short film	
1981	Torro. Torro. Torro!	Crew	Short film	
1985	Crimewave	Apprentice editor		
1995	seaQuest DSV	Writer	Episode: "Lostland"	
1998	Normal Joe	Writer		
1999	Iggy Vile M.D.	Writer	Television film	
2008	Diamonds and Guns	Second unit co-director		
2009	My Treat	Director	Short film	
2011	Morbid Minutes	Director	5 episodes	
2011	Morbid Minutes	Writer	Episodes: "Better to Remember", "Tie Game"	
