= Michael Williams (film director) =

American filmmaker (born 1987)

- Born: June 23, 1987 (age 39); West Point, Mississippi, U.S.
- Education: University of Southern Mississippi (BA)
- Occupations: Film director; screenwriter; film editor; film producer; cinematographer
- Years active: 2008–present
- Notable work: OzLand (2014); The Atoning (2017)
- Partner: Cody Moore
- Website: http://www.shendopen.com

Michael Williams (born June 23, 1987) is an American filmmaker born in West Point, Mississippi.

== Life and career ==
Williams began creating short films in 2004 and since has consistently produced short films and screened them for audiences at annual film festivals and screenings across the U.S.

He earned his Bachelor of Arts degree in film in 2009 from the University of Southern Mississippi and was awarded the Top Film Student of 2009 Award. In 2007, Williams began his professional film career, accumulating a multitude of credits ranging from assistant camera to director of photography for many independent short and feature-length films.

After writing, directing and producing more than 20 short films, Williams broke into the feature-length film territory in 2014 with OzLand, a science fantasy drama inspired by characters and events in L. Frank Baum's The Wonderful Wizard of Oz. While his desire to tell complex stories visually drew him to a career in cinematography, as an artist and storyteller, Williams writes and directs films like OzLand in order to share his stories with those interested in experiencing them while eagerly pursuing the opportunity to bring other people's stories to life as a director of photography.

Today, the filmmaker owns and operates his own company, Shendopen, in West Point, Mississippi. He continues to write and direct his own independent films, produce films by other regional filmmakers and works regionally in the industry as a director of photography. His second feature film, The Atoning, marked his first entry into the horror genre and premiered at the Oxford Film Festival on February 18, 2017. His filmmaking influences include the works of directors Darren Aronofsky, Tim Burton, Jonathan Dayton and Valerie Faris, Mike Nichols, John Patrick Shanley, M. Night Shyamalan and Steven Spielberg.

== Filmography ==
Year	Title	Director	Writer	Producer	Cinematographer	Editor	Notes
2009	The Mistake	co-director	Yes	Yes	Yes	Yes	Short film
2009	The Shovel	No	No	No	Yes	No	Short film
2010	Treat or Eat	No	No	No	Yes	Yes	Short film
2010	Lukos	Yes	Yes	Yes	Yes	Yes	Short film
2011	Zion	No	No	No	Yes	No	Short film
2011	The Fall of Henry	No	No	No	Yes	No	Short film
2011	Illumination	Yes	Yes	Yes	Yes	Yes	Short film
2012	Genrevolt	No	No	co-producer	Yes	No	Short film
2012	Third Shift	No	No	co-producer	Yes	No	Short film
2013	Last Fall	No	No	No	Yes	No	Short film
2013	A Mutual Friend	No	No	No	Yes	No	Short film
2013	S for Sally	No	No	No	Yes	No	Short film
2013	Kane	Yes	Yes	Yes	Yes	Yes	Short film
2014	Earthrise	No	No	co-producer	Yes	No	Feature film
2014	A Horror Movie	No	No	No	Yes	No	Short film
2014	OzLand	Yes	Yes	Yes	Yes	Yes	Feature film, Directorial debut
2015	Dead Saturday	No	No	No	Yes	No	Short film
2015	Complacency	No	No	No	Yes	No	Short film
2016	The Beatdown	No	No	No	Yes	No	Short film
2016	Poison Tree Blues	No	No	No	Yes	No	Short film
2016	Freedom Fighters	No	No	No	Yes	No	Short film
2016	Two Birds	No	No	No	Yes	No	Short film
2016	Tinker	No	No	No	Yes	No	Short film
2016	The Hollow	No	No	No	No	No	Feature film, First Assistant Camera
2016	Bare Knuckle	No	No	No	Yes	No	Short film
2016	Forced Move	No	No	No	Yes	No	Feature film
2017	Crucible City	No	No	No	Yes	No	Short film
2017	Dreamscape	No	No	No	Yes	No	Short film
2017	The Atoning	Yes	Yes	Yes	Yes	Yes	Feature film
2018	Mississippi Minute	No	No	No	Yes	No	Short film
2018	A Son Inherit	No	No	No	Yes	No	Short film
2019	Driven	No	No	No	Yes	No	Feature film
2019	Hallowed Ground	No	No	Yes	Yes	No	Feature film
2019	Super Science Showcase	Yes	No	No	No	No	Segment: "Tom Sawyer Runs the Gauntlet"
2020	Doodle	No	No	No	Yes	No	Short film
2020	Revelation, Alabama	No	No	No	Yes	No	Short film
2020	The Dinner Party	No	No	No	Yes	No	Feature film
2020	Eternity	No	No	No	Yes	No	Feature film
2020	A Dixie Darling Dinner	No	No	No	Yes	No	Short film, in Post Production
2023	Payment Received	No	No	No	Yes	No	Feature film
TBA	Kin	No	No	Yes	No	No	Short film, in Production
TBA	The Star Crossed	No	No	No	Yes	No	Short film, in Production
TBA	The Hidden Few	Yes	Yes	Yes	No	No	Feature film, in development
