= Dennis Latos =

American film director

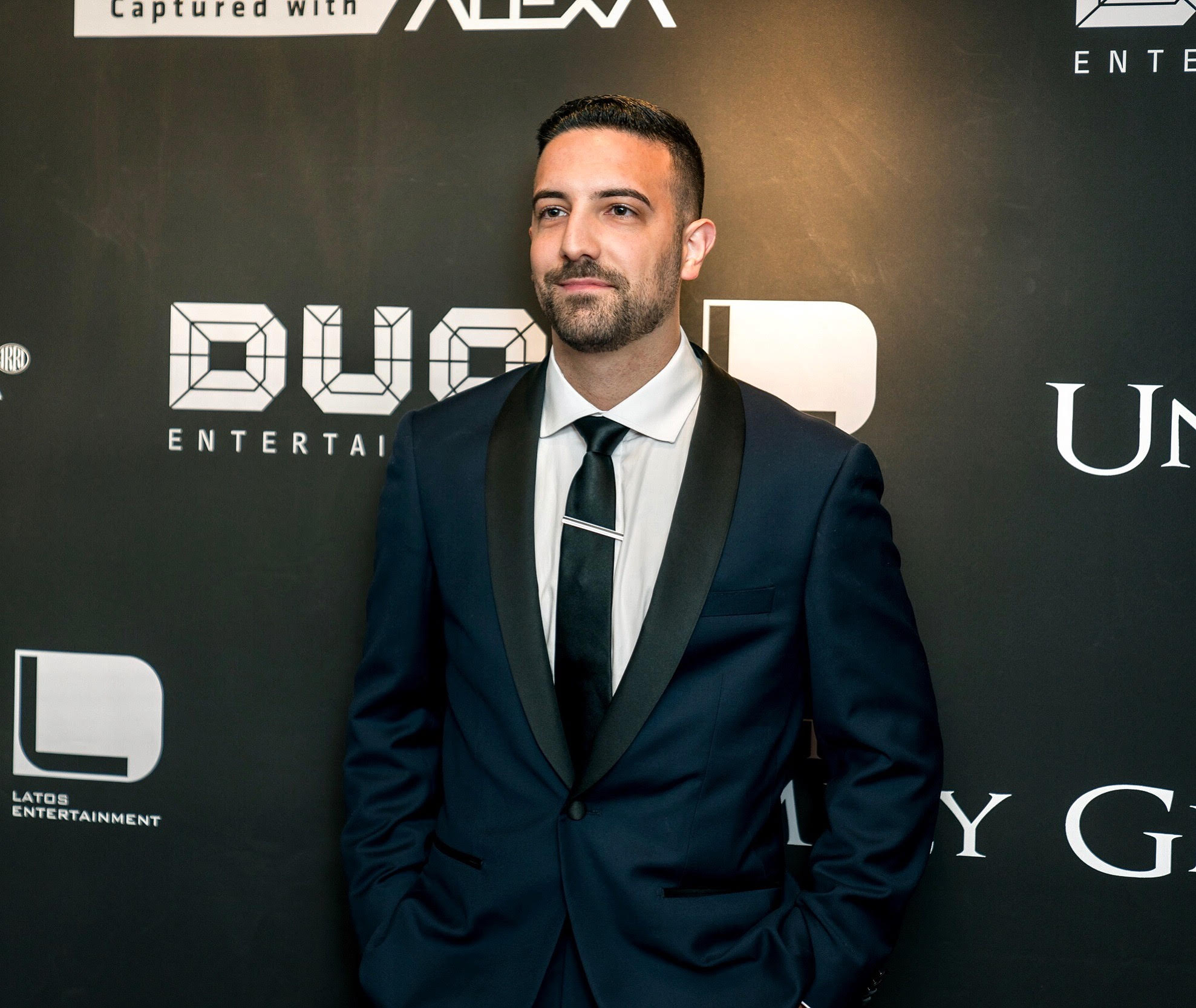
- Latos at the Directors Guild of America Theater in New York City, 2017
- Born: March 11, 1992 (age 34); Flushing, New York, U.S.
- Education: New York University; Hofstra University
- Occupations: Film director, producer, editor
- Years active: 2007 - present
- Employer: Latos Entertainment
- Known for: Bardo, Leylak
- Website: Official website

Dennis Latos (born March 11, 1992) is an American film director, producer and editor. Dennis directed, produced, and edited the short film, Leylak, which held its world premiere at the 20th Annual Tribeca Film Festival in June 2021 and was awarded a Special Jury Prize for the film.

== Early life ==
Dennis Latos was born in Flushing, New York to Greek-American parents. His mother, Julie (née Tsouros), was a florist. His father, Panagiotis (known as Peter) Latos, was a lawyer who ran Latos & Latos law firm in Astoria, Queens.

Dennis Latos attended St. Mary's High School. During his senior year, Latos was accepted to New York University's Tisch School of the Arts Summer Program in Dublin, Ireland.

After graduating high school, Latos attended Emerson College. That November, his father Peter, aged 44, had been diagnosed with an extremely aggressive and virulent stage 4 prostate cancer. After the news, Latos decided to withdraw from Emerson and move back to New York. He transferred into Hofstra University, where he continued his film studies, and made the Provost's List each semester he was there.

Latos then started working as an assistant music video editor and production assistant on music videos for artists such as Fabolous, Red Cafe, Jadakiss, Young Jeezy and Machine Gun Kelly. Latos then created his own production company, Latos Entertainment.

On June 29, 2013, Latos's father died from prostate cancer at age 48. Shortly thereafter, Dennis and his younger brother Stavros (born 1994), formed The Peter Latos Prostate Cancer Foundation (PLPCF) in memory of their father. The foundation's mission is to save lives through early detection and to provide prostate cancer screenings and PSA blood tests for those in need. The foundation also aims to increase awareness through education and provides information about prostate cancer to the public.

== Career ==
In late 2014, Latos landed an internship with Warner Bros. Hollywood producer Michael Tadross at Kaufman Astoria Studios. Tadross is responsible for producing such iconic films such as Coming to America, Die Hard with a Vengeance, Rollerball, The Thomas Crown Affair, I am Legend, Hitch, Sherlock Holmes, Gangster Squad, Winter's Tale, and Ocean's 8. Latos worked in the production office and on set as a production assistant for Tadross's film, Run All Night starring Liam Neeson and Ed Harris.

=== Short films ===
On June 24, 2016, Bardo premiered at The Dolby Theatre in New York City.

Latos and Aharoni then met with Los Angeles based and student Emmy nominated screenwriter Arthur Panoyan to direct their next short film, The Untimely Gift. On October 13, 2017, the film was screened at the Directors Guild of America Theatre in New York City with an audience of over 500 people.

In August 2020, Latos and Aharoni filmed their next short film, Leylak, during the midst of the COVID-19 pandemic, which also plays a role in the film. It held its world premiere at the Tribeca Film Festival on June 12, 2021.

== Filmography ==
=== Film ===
Year	Title	Director	Producer	Editor	Notes
2013	The Paradox	Yes	Yes	Yes	Short film; also sound editor
2013	Running Out	Yes	Yes	Yes	Short film; also cinematographer
2016	Bardo	Yes	Yes	Yes	Short film
2017	The Untimely Gift	Yes	Yes	Yes	Short film; also production designer
2018	Green	No	Executive	No	Short film
2021	Leylak	Yes	Yes	Yes	Short film
2024	M.I.A.	No	Executive	No	Short film
2025	The Second Oldest Man Alive	No	Executive	No	Short film; Post-production
TBA	Gary Loves Goonie	No	Yes	No	Feature film; Pre-production

== Accolades ==
=== Film festival awards ===
Year	Award	Film Festival	Nominated work	Result
2021	Special Jury Mention - Best Narrative Short Film (shared with Scott Aharoni)	Tribeca Film Festival	Leylak	Won
2018	Best Short Film (shared with Scott Aharoni)	Rhode Island International Film Festival	The Untimely Gift	Nominated
2018	Best Short Film (shared with Scott Aharoni)	Bermuda International Film Festival	The Untimely Gift	Nominated
2017	Independent Spirit Award (shared with Scott Aharoni)	Sedona International Film Festival	Bardo	Won
2017	Grand Jury Prize (shared with Scott Aharoni)	Snowtown Film Festival	Bardo	Won
2017	Audience Choice Award (shared with Scott Aharoni)	Downtown Urban Arts International Film Festival	Bardo	Won
2017	Best In Show (shared with Scott Aharoni)	20th Annual Hofstra Film Festival	Bardo	Won
2017	Best Director (shared with Scott Aharoni)	20th Annual Hofstra Film Festival	Bardo	Won
2017	Best Editor (shared with Scott Aharoni)	20th Annual Hofstra Film Festival	Bardo	Won
2017	Best Producer (shared with Scott Aharoni)	20th Annual Hofstra Film Festival	Bardo	Won
2017	Golden Lion (shared with Scott Aharoni)	20th Annual Hofstra Film Festival	Bardo	Won
2017	Best Director (shared with Scott Aharoni)	Madrid International Film Festival	Bardo	Nominated
2017	Best Editor (shared with Scott Aharoni)	Madrid International Film Festival	Bardo	Nominated
2017	Best Short Film (shared with Scott Aharoni)	LA Cinefest	Bardo	Nominated
2017	Best Short (shared with Scott Aharoni)	Golden Door International Film Festival	Bardo	Nominated
