= Psycho Therapy: The Shallow Tale of a Writer Who Decided to Write About a Serial Killer =

American dark comedy film

- Theatrical release poster
- Directed by: Tolga Karaçelik
- Screenplay by: Tolga Karaçelik
- Produced by: Sinan Eczacıbaşı; Scott Aharoni; Mustafa Kaymak; Wren Arthur; Tolga Karaçelik; Alex Peace Power; Alihan Yalçındağ
- Starring: Steve Buscemi; Britt Lower; John Magaro
- Cinematography: Natalie Kingston
- Edited by: Evren Lus
- Music by: Nathan Klein
- Production companies: Curious Gremlin; Olive Productions; Cinegryphon Entertainment; May Productions
- Distributed by: Brainstorm Media
- Release dates: June 8, 2024 (Tribeca Festival); April 4, 2025 (United States)
- Running time: 102 minutes
- Countries: United States; Turkey
- Language: English

Psycho Therapy: The Shallow Tale of a Writer Who Decided to Write About a Serial Killer is a 2024 black comedy film written, directed and co-produced by Tolga Karaçelik in his English-language debut, and starring Steve Buscemi, Britt Lower and John Magaro.

== Plot ==
Kollmick, played by Steve Buscemi, is a retired serial killer who acts as counsellor, or muse, for an author, Keane, providing murderer's material. Kollmick meets Keane, a writer whose working wife is frustrated in her husband's lack of inspiration and is asking for a divorce.

== Cast ==
- John Magaro as Keane, a writer
- Steve Buscemi as Kollmick, a serial killer
- Britt Lower as Suzie, Keane's wife
- Ward Horton as David
- Olli Haaskivi as Seymour
- Sydney Cole Alexander as Zoe

== Production ==
Psycho Therapy: The Shallow Tale of a Writer Who Decided To Write About A Serial Killer marks the English-language debut of director Karaçelik. It is produced by Sinan Eczacıbaşı, Scott Aharoni, Metin Alihan Yalcindag, Wren Arthur, Alex Peace Power, Mustafa Kaymak, plus Tolga Karaçelik and Steve Buscemi who also leads the cast. Alongside Buscemi, the cast also includes Britt Lower and John Magaro.

=== Filming ===
Principal photography took place in New York over 22 days with cinematographer Natalie Kingston, beginning in June 2023.

== Release ==
The film had its world premiere at the Tribeca Festival in New York on June 8, 2024. It was named a runner-up for the Audience Award Narrative competition at the Festival.

== Reception ==
On the review aggregator website Rotten Tomatoes, Psycho Therapy: The Shallow Tale of a Writer Who Decided to Write About a Serial Killer holds an approval rating of 82% from 17 reviews.

Stuart Heritage for The Guardian described it as "a hidden gem of a film".
