= Ryan Jay =

American broadcaster

- Born: January 28, 1974 (age 52); Wisconsin, United States
- Education: University of Wisconsin, Madison
- Occupations: Film critic, television presenter
- Years active: 2004–present
- Known for: Historian of the Land of Oz and The Wizard of Oz
- Website: http://www.ryanjayreviews.com

Ryan Jay is an American film critic and television presenter, known primarily as a historian of the Land of Oz and The Wizard of Oz.

== History ==
As an Oz historian, Ryan has spent decades studying The Wizard of Oz and related materials, products and productions. In 2015 his handprints and autograph were cemented in the Oz Museum in Wamego, KS, just below those of Jerry Maren, the middle Lollipop Guild munchkin in The Wizard of Oz, and near other acclaimed stars of Oz films and historians. He received Honorary Lifetime Membership from the International L. Frank Baum and All Things Oz Historical Foundation in 2017, in recognition of his significant and substantial lifetime achievement in scholarship, performance, teaching and/or support of All Things Oz.

Prior to going solo as a film critic in 2011, from 2006 to 2009, Ryan was the co-host of Clear Channel's PRIDE Radio with Ryan & Caroline, the first nationally syndicated radio talk show targeted to the LGBT community. Known as radio's "Will & Grace", Ryan and Caroline interviewed celebrities, dished pop culture gossip and covered fashion, travel and lifestyle trends. Together, Ryan and Caroline were, and continue to be featured as Fashion Police in Us Weekly magazine. They co-created the movie review and news site: WeSeeMovies.com which is now RyanJayReviews.com. Ryan & Caroline were heard every Friday on morning radio talk shows around the US offering their weekend movie previews. They were the official film critics for Premiere Radio Networks. Ryan is a member of the Broadcast Film Critics Association (BFCA). Ryan Jay & Caroline Hand met during the summer of 2000 while working as producers at VH1 in New York City and fast became best friends. Prior to that significant moment, Ryan had earned a B.A. in journalism from the University of Wisconsin – Madison. While in school he created and led an opportunity for fellow students, offering college credit based on his field experience as intern at Entertainment Tonight and The Sally Jesse Raphael Show. He delivered the commencement address at his graduation.

After college, Ryan joined the news team at the CBS-TV affiliate in Madison, Wisconsin as an on-air reporter. His dislike for formulaic news soon led him to Chicago where he worked as a producer for The Jerry Springer Show. That experience, though wild, was invaluable and paved the way to New York City. He produced another talk show in the Big Apple before moving on to pop culture programming at VH1 where he met Caroline. Among the shows he produced for VH1 was the highly rated five-hour miniseries The 100 Greatest Red Carpet Moments.

Post VH1, Ryan produced a weekly half-hour series for MTV called Bangin' the Charts. He further produced the promotional campaign for the third season of Showtime's Queer as Folk, many on-air promos for Nickelodeon, The Sundance Channel, and Logo, pilots for VH1 and the reality TV version of Sex and the City for Bravo. More recently he has produced The Millionaire Matchmaker for Bravo and What the Sell?! for TLC.
