= Bardo (2016 film) =

2016 film directed by Scott Aharoni and Dennis Latos

- Official film poster
- Directed by: Scott Aharoni; Dennis Latos
- Written by: Petros Georgiadis
- Produced by: Scott Aharoni; Dennis Latos
- Starring: Lelia Goldoni; Johnny Solo; John Belegrinos; Alexandros Rouvas
- Cinematography: Louis Obioha
- Edited by: Scott Aharoni; Dennis Latos
- Music by: Nights Amore; Arn Andersson; Olive Musique; Ryan Trebesch
- Production company: Duo Entertainment
- Distributed by: ShortsTV; Amazon Video
- Release dates: June 24, 2016; (Dolby Theater, NYC)
- Running time: 18 minutes
- Country: United States
- Language: English
- Budget: $10,000

Bardo is a 2016 short drama film directed by Scott Aharoni and Dennis Latos.

== Awards and nominations ==
=== Film festival awards ===
Year	Award	Film Festival	Nominated work	Result
2017	Independent Spirit Award	Sedona International Film Festival	Bardo	Won
2017	Grand Jury Prize	Snowtown Film Festival	Bardo	Won
2017	Audience Choice Award	Downtown Urban Arts International Film Festival	Bardo	Won
2017	Best In Show	20th Annual Hofstra Film Festival	Bardo	Won
2017	Best Director	20th Annual Hofstra Film Festival	Bardo	Won
2017	Best Editor	20th Annual Hofstra Film Festival	Bardo	Won
2017	Best Producer	20th Annual Hofstra Film Festival	Bardo	Won
2017	Golden Lion	20th Annual Hofstra Film Festival	Bardo	Won
2017	Best Director	Madrid International Film Festival	Bardo	Nominated
2017	Best Editor	Madrid International Film Festival	Bardo	Nominated
2017	Best Short Film	LA Cinefest	Bardo	Nominated
2017	Best Short	Golden Door International Film Festival	Bardo	Nominated

=== Film festival official selections ===
Year	Film Festival	Work
2017	Soho International Film Festival	Bardo
2017	Southern City Film Festival	Bardo
2017	NYC Independent Film Festival	Bardo
2017	NewFilmmakers New York	Bardo
2017	New York City Greek Film Festival	Bardo
2016	Fort Lauderdale International Film Festival	Bardo
2016	Cyprus International Film Festival	Bardo
2016	Big Apple Film Festival	Bardo
2016	London Lift-Off Film Festival	Bardo
2016	Sydney Lift-Off Film Festival	Bardo
2016	Bridges International Film Festival	Bardo
