= Leylak (film) =

- Official film poster
- Directed by: Scott Aharoni; Dennis Latos
- Written by: Mustafa Kaymak
- Produced by: Scott Aharoni; Mustafa Kaymak; Dennis Latos
- Starring: Nadir Sarıbacak; Isabella Haddock; Gamze Ceylan; Samrat Chakrabarti; Tony Naumovski
- Cinematography: Laura Valladao
- Edited by: Scott Aharoni; Dennis Latos
- Music by: Ahmet Kenan Bilgic
- Production companies: DUO Entertainment; Latos Entertainment
- Release date: June 12, 2021 (Tribeca)
- Running time: 17 minutes
- Country: United States
- Languages: English; Turkish

Leylak is a 2021 short drama film directed by Scott Aharoni and Dennis Latos and starring Nadir Sarıbacak. The film was written by Mustafa Kaymak. Leylak was shot and edited during the COVID-19 pandemic, in which the film is set. Actor Colman Domingo serves as an executive producer.

The film held its world premiere at the 20th Annual Tribeca Film Festival on June 12, 2021, where it won Special Jury Mention in the Best Narrative Short category.

== Cast ==
- Nadir Sarıbacak as Yusuf Çelik
- Isabella Haddock as Renk Çelik
- Gamze Ceylan as Tulay Çelik
- Samrat Chakrabarti as Abdul
- Tony Naumovski as Markus
- Ibrahim Traore as Ibrahim
- Max Schuster as Cemetery Worker
- Mark Lyons as Cemetery Worker
- Onur Usluca as The Digger
- Louis Pearlman as The Digger
- Joseph Fernandez as The Digger

== Production ==
=== Development and pre-production ===
During 2020, Aharoni & Latos reached out to Kaymak to conceptualize the film's story, using the emotional and mental impact of the pandemic on society, particularly in its setting of New York City, as the basis. The film is told within a 24 hour period, done to heighten the tension of the plot and intensify the situation the characters face in the midst of the pandemic. Aharoni further explained this, by saying: "We didn’t want the film to remain relevant for this year, or the next, but for many years to come – to remind us all that through grief and hardship, there will always be light at the end of the tunnel."

=== Filming ===
Principal photography took place throughout August 2020. Laura Valladao, known for her work on Kevin Wilson Jr.'s Academy Award-nominated short film My Nephew Emmett, served as cinematographer.

== Release ==
The film had its World Premiere at the Tribeca Film Festival on June 12, 2021 and played a successful run on the film festival circuit.

== Awards and nominations ==
Year	Award	Film Festival	Recipients	Result
2021	Special Jury Mention - Narrative Short Film	Tribeca Film Festival	Leylak	Won
2021	Best Short Film - International Competition	Short Shorts Film Festival & Asia	Leylak	Nominated
2021	Best Actor - International Competition	Short Shorts Film Festival & Asia	Nadir Saribacak	Won
2021	Best Short	Indy Shorts International Film Festival	Leylak	Nominated
2021	Best International Short Fiction	Galway Film Fleadh	Leylak	Won
2021	Flickers' Youth Film Jury Award	Rhode Island International Film Festival	Leylak	Won
2021	Grand Prize - Best Short	Rhode Island International Film Festival	Leylak	Nominated
2021	Kathryn Tucker Windham Storyteller Award	Sidewalk Film Festival	Leylak	Won
2021	Best Narrative Short	Port Townsend Film Festival	Leylak	Won
2021	Best Short Film	HollyShorts Film Festival	Leylak	Nominated
2021	Best of the Fest - Best Short Film	Breckenridge Festival of Film	Leylak	Nominated
2021	Best Short Film	LA Shorts International Film Festival	Leylak	Nominated
2021	Jury Prize - Best Short Drama	Woods Hole Film Festival	Leylak	Nominated
2021	Festival Director's Choice Award - Best Actor (Short Youth)	Woods Hole Film Festival	Isabella Haddock	Won
2021	Best Short Film	Maine International Film Festival	Leylak	Nominated
2021	Jury Award - Best Short Fiction	Tirana International Film Festival	Leylak	Nominated
2021	Best Performance - Narrative Short	Tacoma Film Festival	Nadir Saribacak	Won
2021	Grand Jury Prize - Best Narrative Short	Nashville Film Festival	Leylak	Nominated
2021	Best Dramatic Short	New York Shorts International Film Festival	Leylak	Won
2021	Festival Prize - Best Short Film	Boston Film Festival	Leylak	Nominated
2021	Best Narrative Short	Indie Memphis Film Festival	Leylak	Nominated
2021	Grand Jury Award - Best Narrative Short Film	Newport Beach Film Festival	Leylak	Nominated
2021	Special Jury Award - Best Narrative Short	Savannah Film Festival	Leylak	Nominated
2021	Pronck Shorts Competition Award - Best Short Film	Leiden International Film Festival	Leylak	Won
