= Magnolia Independent Film Festival =

Annual film festival in Mississippi, U.S.

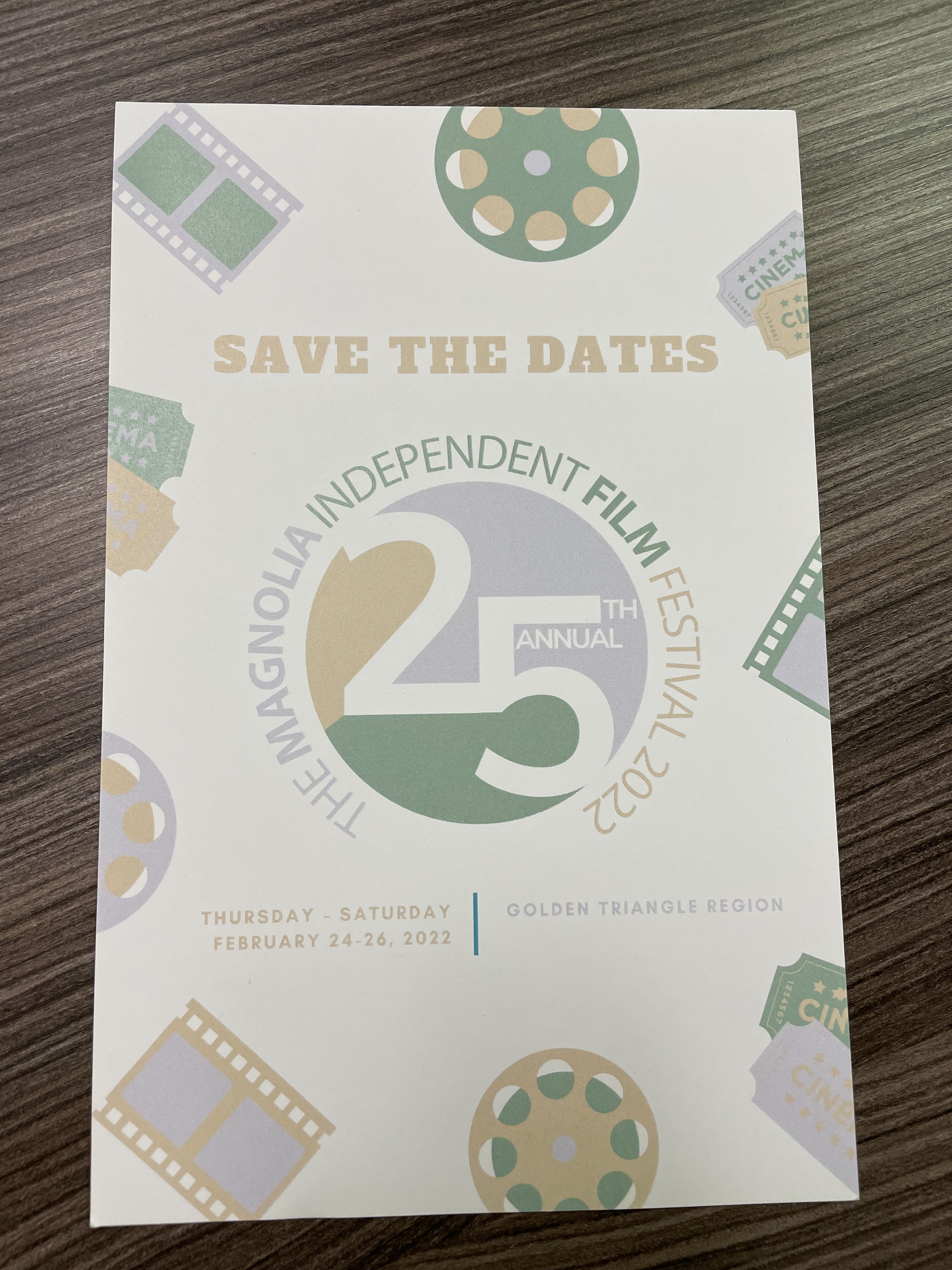
25th Magnolia Independent Film Festival Flyer

The Magnolia Independent Film Festival or The Mag, a film festival based in Mississippi, was founded by Ron Tibbett in 1997 in West Point, Mississippi. It was the first film festival to take place in Mississippi. Three years later it was moved to Starkville.

The Festival is held in February. Films are judged during the festival with awards given at the end. Some of the categories include short films, drama, comedy, experimental, full-length, and documentary films.

Filmmakers are invited to town, taken to and from the airport, and housed at no charge. Breakfasts, lunches, dinners, and additional celebrations are held in their honor throughout the weekend. In 2022, The Mag held its 25th anniversary, returning to Columbus, Mississippi for the first night before returning to Starkville, Mississippi for the remainder of the festival.

== 24th Magnolia Independent Film Festival ==
In response to the COVID-19 pandemic, The Mag chose to hold the festival through an online format. One evening of the event was held in-person but through a drive-in method.
