= Forgiveness (2021 film) =

2021 Mexican-American experimental horror film by Alex Kahuam

- Theatrical release poster
- Directed by: Alex Kahuam
- Written by: Alex Kahuam
- Produced by: Alex Kahuam; Santiago Ortiz-Monasterio
- Starring: Alejandra Toussaint; Alejandra Zaid; Jessica Ortiz; Laura de Ita
- Cinematography: Diego Cacho
- Edited by: Alex Kahuam
- Production companies: Promotora NAE; Desenlace Films
- Release date: August 28, 2021 (United States)
- Running time: 90 minutes
- Countries: Mexico; United States
- Language: English

Forgiveness is a 2021 Mexican-American experimental horror film directed and written by Alex Kahuam. The film premiered at FrightFest in the United Kingdom.

== Premise ==
Magnea, Camila and Aisha wake up in a hospital, with no memories of how they got there. They each find out they've been forever altered: one is blind, one is deaf, one is mute. They will have to find a way out or they'll die.

== Cast ==
- Alejandra Toussaint as Camila
- Alejandra Zaid as Aisha
- Jessica Ortiz as Magnea
- Laura de Ita as The nurse
- Diego Garza as Machete man
- Saul Mercado as Mysterious man

== Reception ==
On Rotten Tomatoes, the film holds an approval rating of 60% based on 5 reviews, with an average rating of 5.80/10. Martin Unsworth of Starburst magazine wrote: "Forgiveness is packed full of disturbing imagery with a surreal edge and is terrifyingly mesmerising."

=== Accolades ===
Year	Award	Category	Recipient(s)	Result	Ref.
2021	FrightFest	Discovery Screen	Alex Kahuam	Nominated	
2021	IFI HORRORTHON	Best Film	Alex Kahuam	Nominated	
2021	Grimmfest	Best Feature Film	Alex Kahuam	Nominated	
2021	Morbido Film Fest	Best Latin American Film	Alex Kahuam	Nominated	
