= Scott Aharoni =

American film director and producer

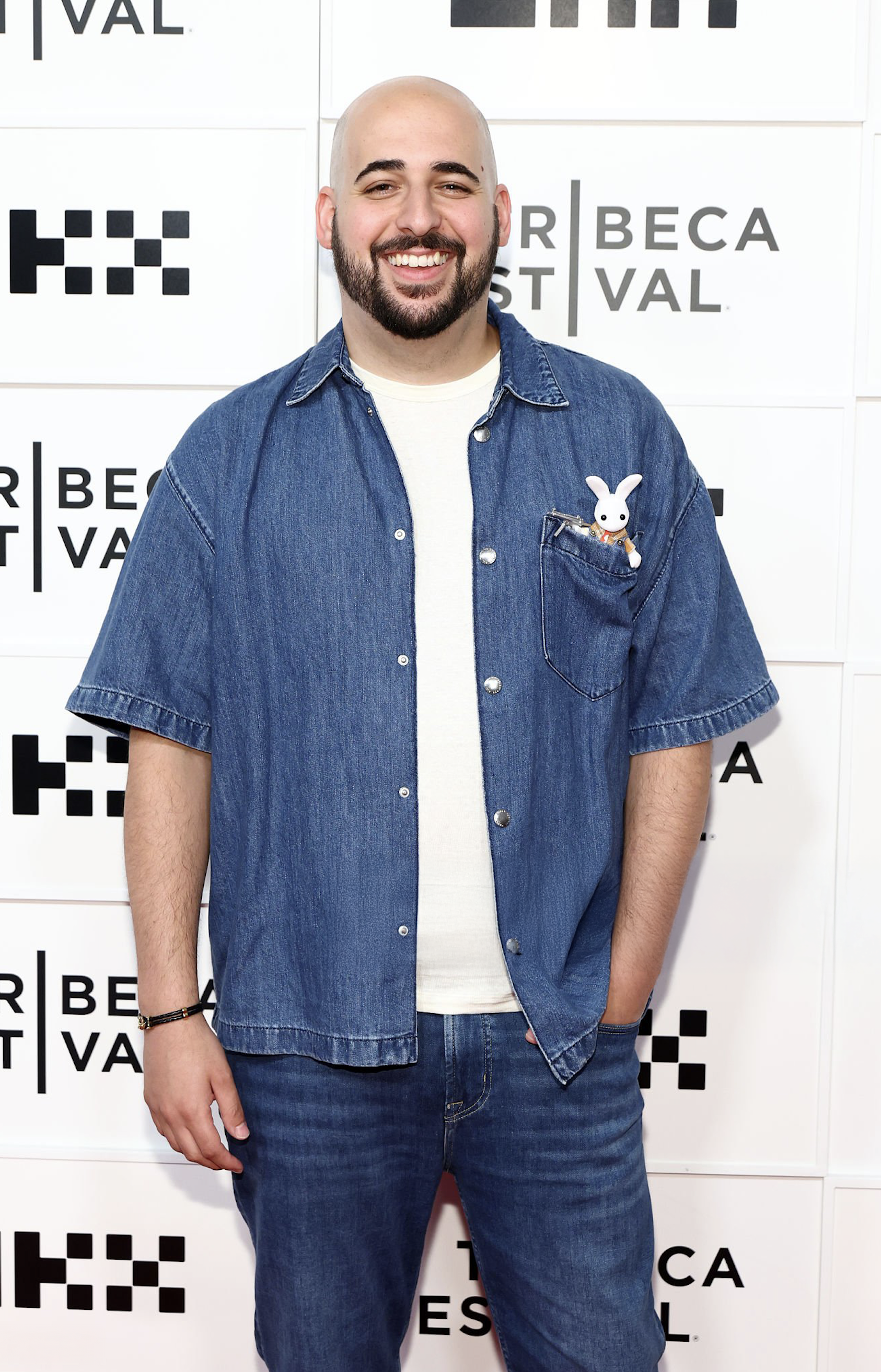
- Aharoni at the 2026 Tribeca Festival
- Born: January 4, 1994 (age 32); Long Island, New York
- Education: William A. Shine Great Neck South High School; Hofstra University
- Occupations: Film director, producer, editor
- Years active: 2012-present
- Known for: The Chronology of Water; The Testament of Ann Lee; Our Hero, Balthazar
- Website: curiousgremlin.com

Scott Aharoni (born January 4, 1994) is an American film producer and director. He is a co-founder of Curious Gremlin, an American independent entertainment company specializing in film and television development, production and financing.

== Early life and education ==
Aharoni was born in Great Neck, New York, on January 4, 1994. He grew up studying the art of sleight of hand magic and even performed on stage and at special events. He was introduced to moviemaking in middle school.

During his time in high school, he participated in the school district's public television news station, which featured a full production TV studio and mobile film truck. He directed and produced several forms of content under the GNPS TV banner, including the school's morning news show, sporting events, concerts, and graduation ceremonies. After graduating from the William A. Shine Great Neck South High School, he attended Hofstra University on a Presidential Scholarship. He pursued his bachelor of science in film and television production and graduated with summa cum laude Latin Honors from the Honors College at Hofstra University in 2016.

While doing his bachelor's, Aharoni worked as a freelance director and editor, working on experimental short films, commercials, and music videos.

In 2015, in his final year at Hofstra University, Aharoni produced, directed, and edited his senior thesis short film, Bardo.

Bardo won the 1st Annual Golden Lion Award, which was awarded to the filmmaker of the year, at the 20th Annual Hofstra Film Festival in 2016. It also won awards for best director, producer, and editor. Bardo premiered at The Dolby Theatre in New York City in 2016.

After graduating from Hofstra University, Aharoni continued to work on music videos and commercials as a freelance director and producer. In 2017 he directed, produced, and edited his next short, The Untimely Gift. The film premiered at the Directors Guild of America Theatre in New York City and received critical praise.

== Career ==
In August 2020, Aharoni directed, produced, and edited his next short film, Leylak, during the midst of the COVID-19 pandemic. The film was executive produced by Colman Domingo and Oscar nominee Doug Roland. The film held its world premiere at the Tribeca Film Festival on June 12, 2021, and won the Special Jury Prize. In 2020, he served as executive pProducer for the film The Criminals, which was shortlisted for the 94th Academy Awards.

After the success of Leylak, Aharoni co-founded Curious Gremlin, an American independent entertainment company specializing in film and television development, production and financing. Curious Gremlin produced their first feature film titled, Psycho Therapy: The Shallow Tale of a Writer Who Decided to Write About a Serial Killer, which stars Steve Buscemi, John Magaro, and Britt Lower won an Audience Choice Award at the 2024 Tribeca Film Festival.

Since then, Aharoni has served as an Executive Producer on various projects, including Kristen Stewart's directorial debut, The Chronology of Water, which stars Imogen Poots and held its world premiere at the 2025 Cannes Film Festival; Lofty Nathan's The Carpenter's Son, which stars Nicolas Cage and Noah Jupe; Oscar Boyson's directorial debut, Our Hero, Balthazar which stars Jaeden Martell, Asa Butterfield and Noah Centineo, and held its world premiere at Tribeca Film Festival; Dylan Meyer's directorial debut, The Wrong Girls, which stars Kristen Stewart, Seth Rogen, LaKeith Stanfield, Kumail Nanjiani and Alia Shawkat; and Mona Fastvold's The Testament of Ann Lee, which stars Amanda Seyfried, Thomasin McKenzie, Lewis Pullman, Stacy Martin, Tim Blake Nelson, Christopher Abbott and Matthew Beard, and will premiere at the 82nd Venice International Film Festival.

In 2026, Aharoni was invited to join the Academy of Motion Picture Arts and Sciences as part of its Class of 2026 in the Short Films Branch. That same month, it was announced he was producing David Robert Mitchell's They Follow, the sequel to It Follows, starring Maika Monroe, Michael Gandolfini, Jackie Earle Haley, Justine Lupe, Ariela Barer, Greg Kinnear, Ashley Romans, Ryan Destiny, and Don McManus. Under the Curious Gremlin banner, Aharoni optioned the film rights to Lady Macbeth, the novel by The New York Times bestselling author Ava Reid, for adaptation as a feature film, with Academy Award nominee Emma Donoghue attached to write the screenplay and BAFTA Award winner and Primetime Emmy Award nominee Kari Skogland set to direct. The acquisition marked another high-profile literary adaptation for the company as it continued to expand its development slate across prestige independent film.

Through a growing slate of internationally recognized filmmakers, literary adaptations, and independent features, Aharoni's Curious Gremlin has continued to establish itself as an increasingly prominent force in the independent film landscape, with projects spanning festival cinema, prestige literary adaptations, and commercially driven auteur filmmaking.

== Filmography ==
=== Film ===
Year	Title	Director	Producer	Executive Producer	Editor	Notes
2013	The Paradox	No	Yes	No	No	Short film
2014	Separation	No	Yes	No	No	Short film
2015	Love Bug	No	Yes	No	No	Short film
2016	Bardo	Yes	Yes	No	Yes	Short film
2017	The Untimely Gift	Yes	Yes	No	Yes	Short film; also production designer
2018	Green	No	No	Yes	No	Short film
2020	The Criminals	No	No	Yes	No	Short film
2021	Leylak	Yes	Yes	No	Yes	Short film
2023	The Old Young Crow	No	No	Yes	No	Short film
2023	nothing, except everything.	No	Yes	No	No	Short film
2023	Death and Ramen	No	Yes	No	No	Short film
2023	The Walk	No	No	Yes	No	Feature film
2024	Not Your Average Family	No	No	Yes	No	Feature film
2024	you are seen.	No	Yes	No	No	Short film
2024	A Good Day Will Come	No	No	Yes	No	Short film
2024	Psycho Therapy: The Shallow Tale of a Writer Who Decided to Write About a Serial Killer	No	Yes	No	No	Feature film
2025	The Carpenter's Son	No	No	Yes	No	Feature film
2025	The Chronology of Water	No	No	Yes	No	Feature film
2025	We Are Kings	No	No	Yes	No	Short film
2025	Money Talks	No	Yes	No	No	Short film
2025	Our Hero, Balthazar	No	No	Yes	No	Feature film
2025	Sunday Sauce	No	No	Yes	No	Short film
2025	The Testament of Ann Lee	No	No	Yes	No	Feature film
TBA	Next	No	No	Yes	No	Short film
TBA	Alpha Gang	No	No	Yes	No	Feature film
TBA	Glide: All the People I'll Never Be	No	No	Yes	No	Short film
TBA	The Wrong Girls	No	No	Yes	No	Feature film

== Accolades ==
Year	Organization	Film	Award	Result	Notes
2016	Hofstra Film Festival	Bardo	Best In Show	Won	
2016	Hofstra Film Festival	Bardo	Best Director	Won	
2016	Hofstra Film Festival	Bardo	Best Producer	Won	
2016	Hofstra Film Festival	Bardo	Best Editor	Won	
2017	Sedona International Film Festival	Bardo	Independent Spirit Award	Won	
2017	Madrid International Film Festival	Bardo	Best Director of a Short Film	Nominated	
2017	Madrid International Film Festival	Bardo	Best Editor	Nominated	
2017	Downtown Urban Arts International Film Festival	Bardo	Best Film	Nominated	
2017	Downtown Urban Arts International Film Festival	Bardo	Audience Choice Award	Won	
2017	Snowtown Film Festival	Bardo	Best Short Film	Won	
2017	Golden Door International Film Festival	Bardo	Best Short	Nominated	
2018	Bermuda International Film Festival	The Untimely Gift	Best International Short	Nominated	
2018	Rhode Island International Film Festival	The Untimely Gift	Best Short Film	Nominated	
2019	Utah Film Festival	The Untimely Gift	Short Editing	Nominated	
2021	Tribeca Festival	Leylak	Special Jury Mention - Narrative Short Film	Won	
2021	Tribeca Festival	Leylak	Best Short Film - International Competition	Nominated	
2021	Short Shorts Film Festival & Asia	Leylak	Best Short Film - International Competition	Nominated	
2021	Indy Shorts International Film Festival	Leylak	Best Short	Nominated	
2021	Galway Film Fleadh	Leylak	Best International Short Fiction	Won	
2021	Rhode Island International Film Festival	Leylak	Flickers' Youth Film Jury Award - Best Narrative Short	Won	
2021	Rhode Island International Film Festival	Leylak	Grand Prize - Best Short	Nominated	
2021	Sidewalk Film Festival	Leylak	Kathryn Tucker Windham Storyteller Award	Won	
2021	Port Townsend Film Festival	Leylak	Best Narrative Short	Won	
2021	HollyShorts Film Festival	Leylak	Best Short Film	Nominated	
2021	Breckenridge Festival of Film	Leylak	Best of the Fest - Best Short Film	Nominated	
2021	LA Shorts International Film Festival	Leylak	Best Short Film	Nominated	
2021	Woods Hole Film Festival	Leylak	Jury Prize - Best Short Drama	Nominated	
2021	Maine International Film Festival	Leylak	Best Short Film	Nominated	
2021	Tirana International Film Festival	Leylak	Jury Award - Best Short Fiction	Nominated	
2021	Nashville Film Festival	Leylak	Grand Jury Prize - Best Narrative Short	Nominated	
2021	New York Shorts International Film Festival	Leylak	Best Dramatic Short	Won	
2021	Boston Film Festival	Leylak	Festival Prize - Best Short Film	Nominated	
2021	Indie Memphis Film Festival	Leylak	Best Narrative Short	Nominated	
2021	Newport Beach Film Festival	Leylak	Grand Jury Award - Best Narrative Short Film	Nominated	
2021	Savannah Film Festival	Leylak	Special Jury Award - Best Narrative Short	Nominated	
2021	Leiden International Film Festival	Leylak	Pronck Shorts Competition Award - Best Short Film	Won	
2022	Atlanta Film Festival	Leylak	Grand Jury Award - Narrative Short	Nominated	
2022	Sedona International Film Festival	Leylak	Best Short Film	Nominated	
2022	NewFilmmakers Los Angeles	Leylak	Best Short Film	Nominated	
2022	San Francisco Indie Short Festival	Leylak	Best Narrative US Short Film	Nominated	
2022	Florida Shorts	Leylak	Jury Prize - Short	Nominated	
2025	HollyShorts Film Festival	Money Talks	Best Producer	Won	
