= Alex Kahuam =

Mexican-American filmmaker

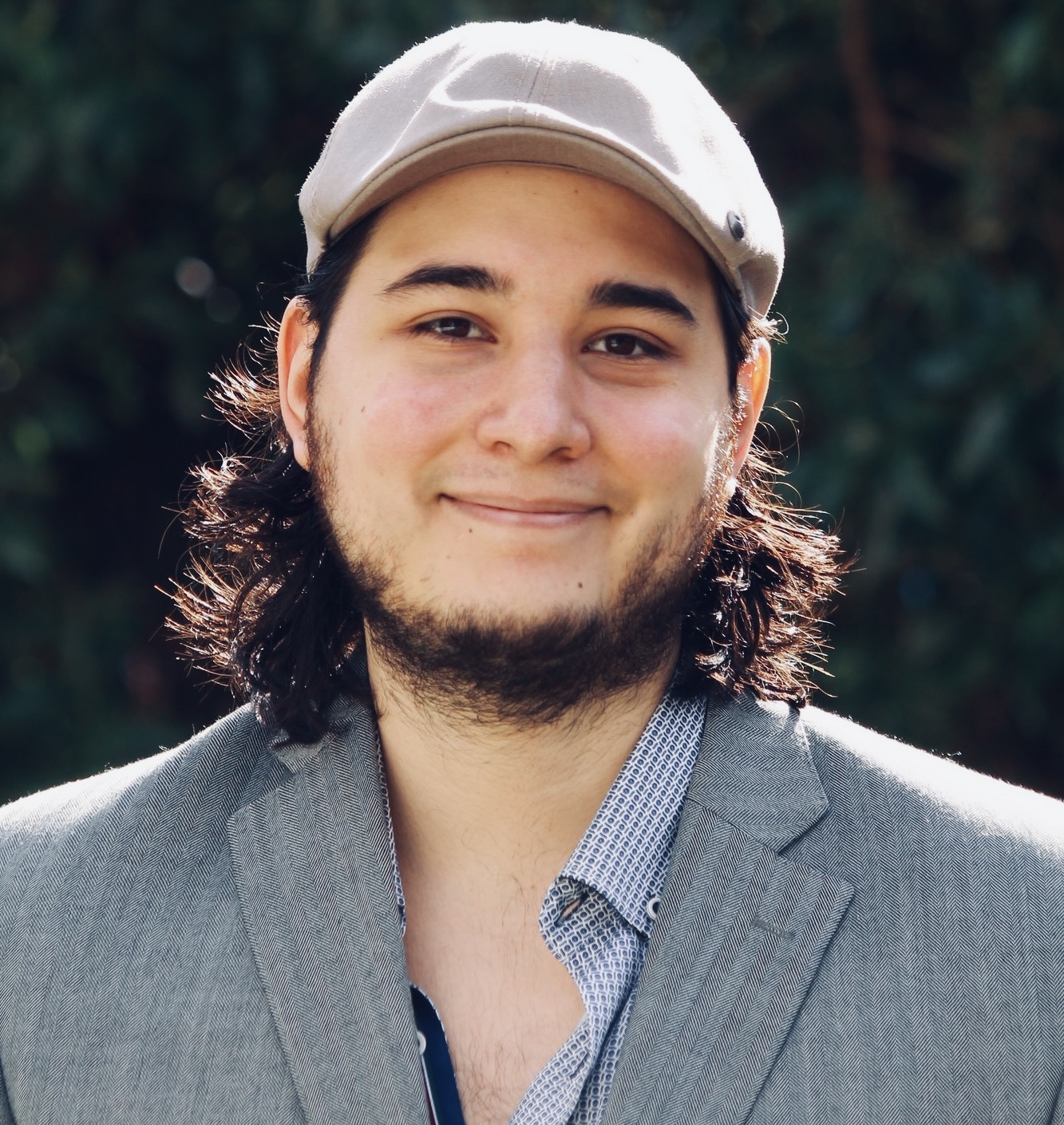
- Kahuam at the 2020 Sitges Film Festival
- Born: Mexico City, Mexico
- Education: New York Film Academy
- Occupations: Film director; screenwriter; film editor; film producer
- Years active: 2011–present
- Known for: Forgiveness; Failure!; The Remedy

Alex Kahuam is a Mexican-American filmmaker best known for the films Red Light (2020), Forgiveness (2021), and Failure! (2023).

== Early life ==
Kahuam was born in Mexico City, Mexico. He is third generation of a Lebanese family who immigrated to Mexico. After moving to Los Angeles in 2012, he graduated with a B.F.A in filmmaking at the New York Film Academy.

== Career ==
Kahuam's short film Red Light starred Ted Raimi and premiered at the Sitges Film Festival in 2020. In 2021, his third feature film Forgiveness premiered at Frightfest. His 2023 film Failure! was shot entirely in a single long take making him the first Mexican filmmaker to make a one shot feature film in the United States.

== Filmography ==
Feature films
Year	Title	Director	Writer	Editor	Producer	Note
2012	Escondida	Yes	Yes	Yes	Yes	
2018	So, You Want to Be a Gangster?	Yes	Yes	Yes	Yes	
2021	Forgiveness	Yes	Yes	Yes	Yes	
2023	Failure!	Yes	Yes	Yes	Yes	
2026	The Remedy	Yes	No	Yes	Yes	

Short films
Year	Title	Director	Writer	Editor	Producer
2011	Disaster Date	Yes	Yes	No	No
2014	Night Lights-Make Me Smile	Yes	Yes	Yes	Yes
2014	What's in the Case?	Yes	Yes	Yes	Yes
2014	So, You Want to Be a Gangster?	Yes	Yes	Yes	Yes
2015	Salvador Santana: Till the Mornin' Light	Yes	Yes	Yes	No
2018	LAX	Yes	Yes	Yes	Yes
2020	Red Light	Yes	Yes	Yes	Yes

== Awards and nominations ==
Award	Year	Film	Category	Result	Ref.
Sitges Film Festival	2020	Red Light	Best International Short Film	Nominated	
Telluride Horror Show	2020	Red Light	Best Short Film	Nominated	
Strasbourg European Fantastic Film Festival	2021	Red Light	Best International Short Film	Nominated	
