= Eytinge =

Eytinge is a surname. Notable people with the name include:

- Harry Eytinge (1822–1902), American stage actor
- Louis Victor Eytinge (1878–1938), American convicted murderer
- Pearl Eytinge (1854–1914), American stage actress
- Rose Eytinge (1835–1911), American stage actress and author
- Sol Eytinge Jr. (1833–1905), American illustrator
