= Barrison Sisters =

Risqué vaudeville act (1893–1897)

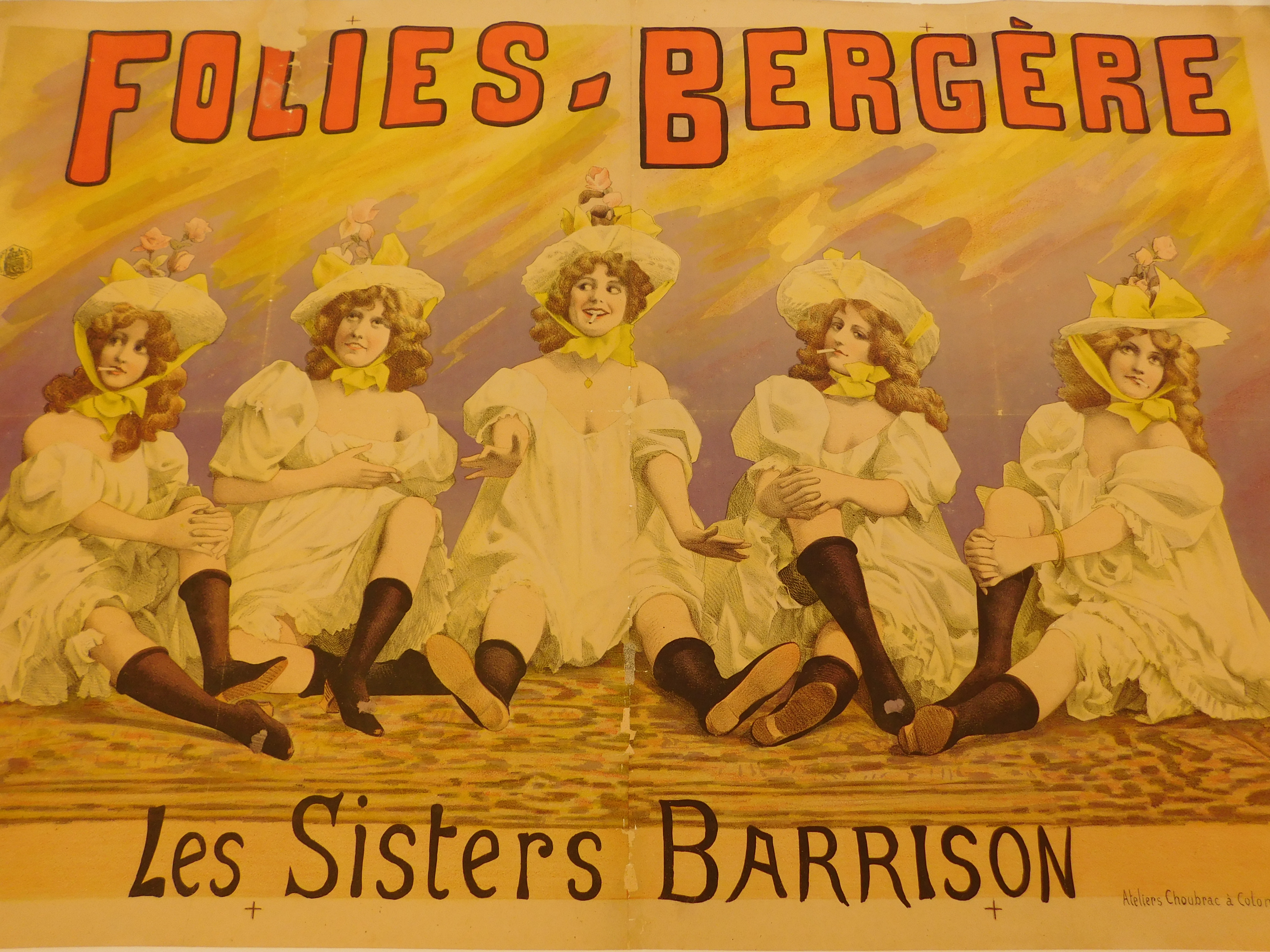
- The Barrison Sisters in the Folies Bergère (Paris); Poster by Alfred Choubrac (1890).

Background information
- Origin: Copenhagen, Denmark
- Genre: Vaudeville
- Years active: 1893–1897
- Past members: • Lona (Abelone Maria Barrison, 1871–1939) • Olga (Hansine Johanne Barrison, 1875–1908) • Sophia (Sofie Kathrine Theodora Barrison, 1877–1906) • Inger (Inger Marie Barrison, 1878–1918) • Gertrude (Gertrud Marie Barrison, 1881–1946)

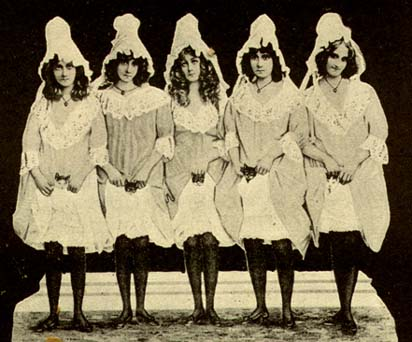
The Barrison Sisters, c. 1890s, reveal kittens beneath their skirts.

The Barrison Sisters were a risqué vaudeville act which performed in the United States and Europe from about 1893 to 1897; in the United States they were advertised as The Wickedest Girls in the World.

== Origin ==
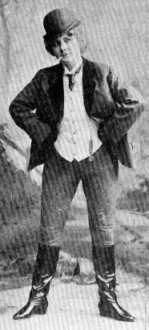
Lona Barrison in Berlin, 1903

Lona (Abelone Maria, 1871–1939), Olga (Hansine Johanne, 1875–1908), Sophia (Sofie Kathrine Theodora, 1877–1906), Inger (Inger Marie, 1878–1918), and Gertrude (Gertrud Marie, 1881–1946) Barrison were actual sisters (many "sister" vaudeville acts were not) of Danish-German descent. The five sisters were all born in Copenhagen, Denmark. Along with their mother, the sisters emigrated to the United States in 1886, joining their father, who had earlier made the same journey.

Lona Barrison, the oldest of the sisters, had a fleeting theatre experience in Copenhagen as a young girl, and it was she who initially gravitated towards the theatre scene after the family settled in Manhattan, New York City. Later on, she was joined by her siblings. Originally called Bareisen, they anglicized their surname, thus becoming the Barrison Sisters. The five blond and curly-haired siblings were said to sing in high squeaky voices and dance with middling ability. They achieved notoriety, however, by ingenious use of double entendres on stage.

Actress Pearl Eytinge initially produced them and wrote a comedietta for them called Mr Cupid. Her manager, Danish-born William (Wilhelm Ludvig) Fleron (1858–1935), took over the management of the sisters and married Lona in 1893.

== Most famous act ==
In their most famous act, the sisters would dance, raising their skirts slightly above their knees, and ask the audience, "Would you like to see my pussy?" When they had coaxed the audience into an enthusiastic response, they would raise up their skirts, revealing that each sister was wearing underwear of their own manufacture that had a live kitten secured over the crotch.

After their success in Europe in the mid-1890s, scores of troupes purporting to be "sisters" followed in their footsteps, among them the British Machinson Sisters. The Barrison Sisters broke up in 1897, but both Gertrude and Lona went on to have successful solo careers on the stage. Gertrude, the youngest and perhaps most talented of them all, became a groundbreaking modern dancer in Vienna, where she lived for two decades, married to Carl Hollitzer (separated in 1910), a renowned Austrian painter. She was the last to die—in 1946 in Copenhagen.

== Renewed attention ==
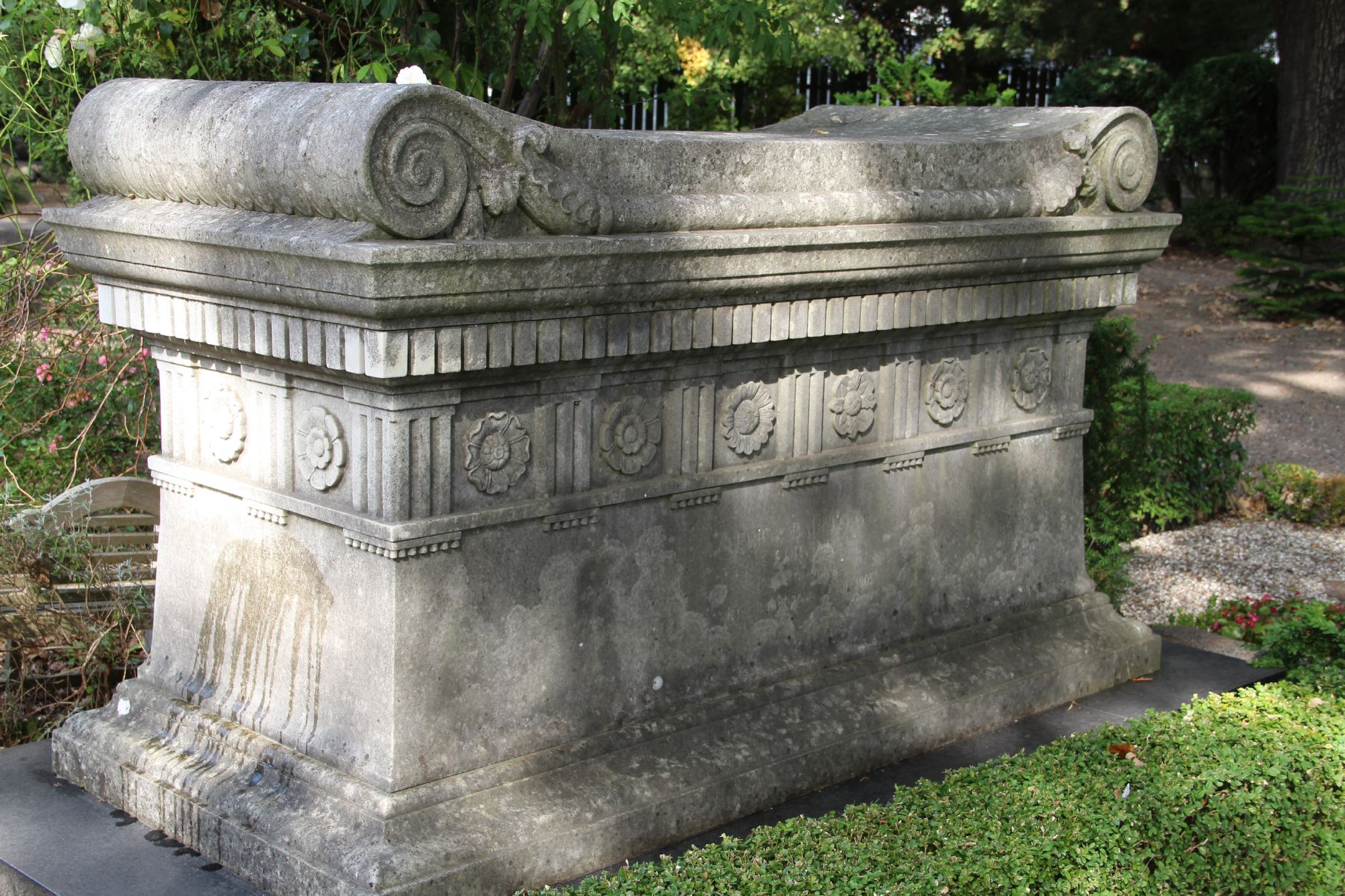
Sophie Barrison's and Inger Barrison's tombstone in Copenhagen's Garrison Cemetery.

The Barrison Sisters came to renewed public attention in the first decade of the 21st century when they were featured on the label of Five Wives Vodka, produced by Ogden's Own Distillery in Utah; the vodka was initially rejected for sale in the adjacent control state of Idaho, an action for which the Idaho State Liquor Division was later awarded a 2013 Muzzles Award by the Thomas Jefferson Center for the Protection of Free Expression.

A Danish book about the phenomenon, Barrison-feberen by Hans Henrik Appel, was published in 2020. It won the Danish annual history book award for 2020. The book served as the basis of the musical Feberen by Line Mørkeby and Niels Søren Hansen. The musical opened April 30, 2025 at the Royal Danish Playhouse, closing June 3 the same year and notably starring Fanny Leander Bornedal as Inger Barrison.
