= ISLD =

ISLD may refer to:

- Idaho State Liquor Division, an Idaho state authority controlling alcohol sales
- Inter-Service Liaison Department, a cover name employed by the British Secret Intelligence Service in the Middle East and Asia during World War II
- Independent state legislature doctrine
