= Harry Eytinge =

American actor

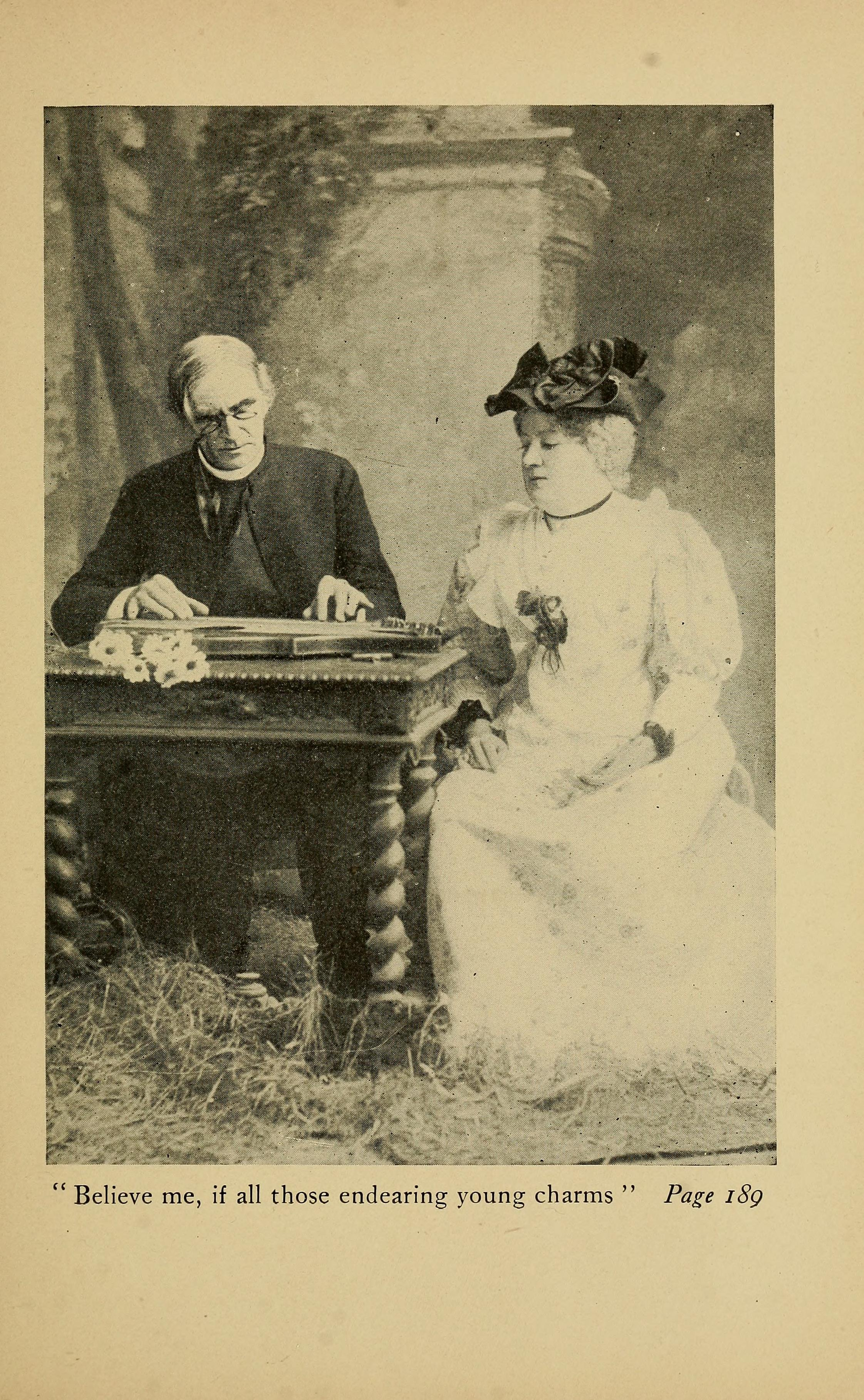
Harry Eytinge (left) in the Broadway comedy Captain Lettarblair (1891)

Henry S. Eytinge (1822–1902) was an American actor, stage manager and producer, who captained the USS Shepherd Knapp during the American Civil War.

== Early career ==
Eytinge was the son of Dutch merchant, Solomon Eytinge, who had settled in Philadelphia and in 1821 married American, Mary Ann Miller. Henry, their first of twelve children, was born in Philadelphia on October 30, 1822. He received a good education before taking to the stage, joining a group of strolling players and getting his first serious role at the age of seventeen with C. A. Logan at the Albany Pearl Street Theatre. The following season he played Mitchell's Olympic Theatre in New York.

He was also interested in the sea and took a break from the stage, sailing to the Netherlands possibly in connection with his father's mercantile business. On his return he continued his stage career and produced a play by Dion Boucicault's, called London Assurance, in Norfolk, Virginia, but it was not profitable. In about 1843 he went to sea again as owner/master of the brig Ganges, trading between America, Europe and the Mediterranean with his father acting as shipping agent. During this period he visited London and appeared in two minor plays in the Strand Theatre – Ben the Boatswain and Monsieur Tonson (1847). (Note: The English newspapers of the period reported that the actor who played these parts was Harry St. Cyr Perry, either a stage name used by Eytinge or misprint.) After eight years he returned to the American theatre; in 1852 he was a stage manager in Cincinnati and in 1854 entered into a joint management venture with Henry E. Willard at the Metropolitan Theatre and New York Opera House.

== American Civil War ==
At the start of the American Civil War, the US Navy faced a shortage of competent officers. Eytinge volunteered and was accepted by the examining board, but his suitability was later questioned in a letter received by Abraham Lincoln. The letter from a Mr William Fenwick, described Eytinge as a stage manager of the Laura Keene's Theatre and "has seen some but not very creditable Sea Service". Lincoln asked George W. Blunt, head of New York City's Naval Examining Board, to investigate and he responded, defending the decision to appoint. As a result, Eytinge was given command of the eight-gun sailing ship USS Shepherd Knapp and ordered to cruise in the West Indies. (Note: Eytinge's son (of the same name) joined the crew of the Shepherd Knapp as acting master's mate, later serving on USS Fort Jackson. He had first volunteered for the 9th Regiment, New York Infantry, Company K, but resigned in August 1861. He is shown in Edward W. Callahan's List of Officers of the Navy of the United States and of the Marine Corps from 1775 to 1900 P187, as joining the navy on 1 December 1862; deserted 1 April 1865.) The Shepherd Knapp, being a sailing ship, had the advantage, over steam-powered vessels, of being able to remain at sea for several months at a time. On the first voyage Eytinge became unhappy with the handling of the ship, and in contravention of his orders to remain at sea, called into St. Thomas to load 200 tons of additional ballast.

The Shepherd Knapp was tasked with searching for the Confederate Raider the CSS Sumter and for arresting any vessel blockade busting. Perhaps because of his background, Eytinge's reports to US Naval command tended to be theatrical, for example: "place Semmes before me – I ask no more. I shall conquer or die at my guns." Eytinge never faced Captain Raphael Semmes or the Sumter, but had some success: on the 4 September 1862 he captured a British blockade runner named Fanny Laurie trying to enter South Edisto and she was taken as a prize. Eytinge's total prize money from the war was a modest $525. On the 18 May 1863 the Shepherd Knapp grounded on the entrance to Cape Haitian and it proved impossible to refloat her. There was no loss of life and all that could be salvaged was removed including the guns. Eytinge was next given command of the USS Chillicothe and sent to Ellis Cliffs to relieve the USS Manitou. Unfortunately the Chillicothe grounded twice en route and Eytinge was relieved of command; his appointment with the navy was revoked in December 1863.

== Post-war ==
After the war Eytinge returned to the theatre, producing, managing and acting. The expansion of the railroad systems made travel to distant theatres easier for actors and productions. Eytinge spent several years in California during the early 1870s and in 1877/78 ran productions and an acting school in Ohio. At this time he met and married a woman about thirty years younger than himself named Ida Seebohm. Within weeks the newspapers reported that a woman in New York, calling herself Eliza P. Eytinge, was claiming to be Harry Eytinge's wife. It became apparent that Eytinge had lived with this woman, and because of this, she considered herself married under the laws of New York. Harry Eytinge and Ida Seebohm had a child named, Louis Victor Eytinge, who got on the wrong side of the law at an early age and was eventually convicted of murder. During his time in prison he started writing about character development and advertising; his work made him famous and wealthy and he was eventually released on parole.

== Family ==
Harry Eytinge was also an accomplished painter and came from a family of artists, writers and actors. His siblings included Sol Eytinge the illustrator, and Charles D. Eytinge another actor. His cousins included Samuel D. Eytinge (Note: Samuel D. Eytinge, actor (1829-1859), married Emily Kelly Moss, sister of Theodore Moss, treasurer and later manager of Wallack's Theatre.) and Rose Eytinge. His nephew, Dennis Miller Bunker, was an impressionist painter and step-niece, Pearl Eytinge, was an actress.

Eytinge died in Nyack, New York, on 18 September 1902 and is buried in the family plot at the Green-Wood Cemetery.

== Silent movie actor Harry B. Eytinge ==
One of the early actors in the American movie industry was Harry Bradley Eytinge. Newspaper coverage of the movie business at this time alludes to him being the son of the stage actor Harry Eytinge. However, his real name was James Henry Squint, born 1862 in Reading, Pennsylvania. His father died at the end of the American Civil War and his mother died when he was fourteen. He changed his name in 1906 and initially worked in the Edison Studios of New Jersey and New York. His adopted son, Bruce Swomley Eytinge, recalls in his published reminiscences that they were regular visitors to the home of the stage actor Harry Eytinge's widow.
