= Bad Deutsch-Altenburg =

Town in Lower Austria, Austria

- Municipality
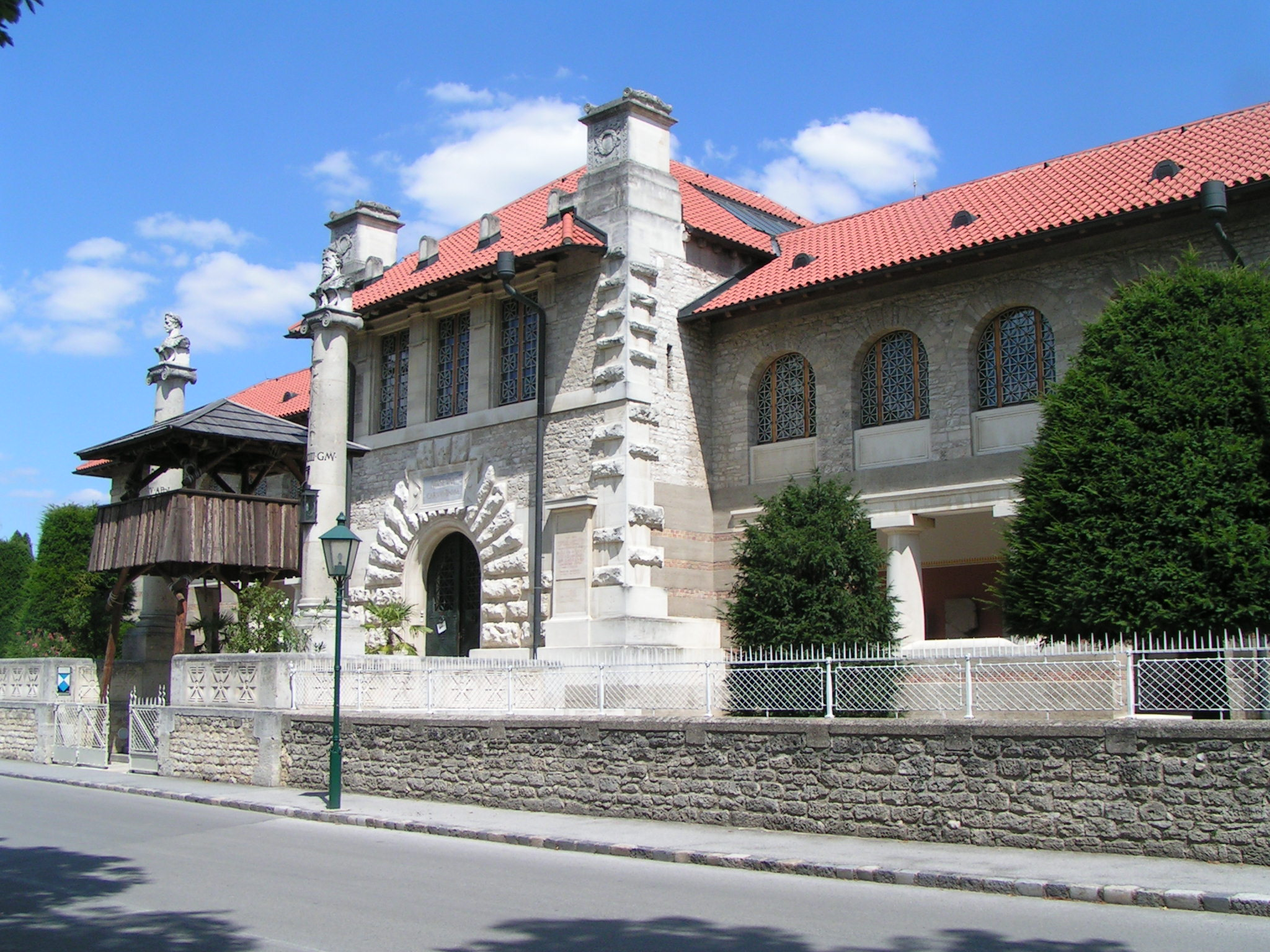
- Museum Carnuntinum

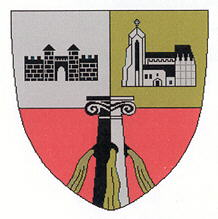
- Coat of arms

- Location within Austria
- Coordinates: 48°8′N 16°54′E
- Country: Austria
- State: Lower Austria
- District: Bruck an der Leitha

Government
  - Mayor: Petra Wagener (SPÖ)

Area
  - Total: 12.58 km^{2} (4.86 sq mi)
- Elevation: 148 m (486 ft)

Population (2018-01-01)
  - Total: 1,765
  - Density: 140.3/km^{2} (363.4/sq mi)
- Time zone: UTC+1 (CET)
  - Summer (DST): UTC+2 (CEST)
- Postal code: 2405
- Area code: 02165
- Website: www.baddeutsch-altenburg.at

Bad Deutsch-Altenburg, until 1928 Deutsch-Altenburg (Hungarian: Németóvár) is a market town and spa in the district of Bruck an der Leitha in Lower Austria in Austria.

== Geography ==
The town lies in the Lower Austrian Industrieviertel region, on the right riverbank of the Danube River and the Danube-Auen National Park, south-west of Hainburg an der Donau and Devín Gate.

As of 2025, 78.2% of the municipality's area is used for agricultural purposes.

The health resort is centered on iodine and sulfur springs, which are some of the most powerful in Central Europe.

=== Climate ===
Bad Deutsch-Altenburg lies in the transitional zone between having an oceanic climate and a humid continental climate (Cfb bordering on Dfb according to the Köppen climate classification). On 8 August 2013, a temperature of 40.5 °C (104.9 °F) was recorded, which was the highest temperature ever recorded in Austria at the time. On 29 June 2026, a temperature of 40.1 °C (104.2 °F) set a new June temperature record for Austria. On 5 August 2026, a temperature of 41.2 °C (106.2 °F) was measured, once again setting a new record for the highest temperature in Austria.

== History ==
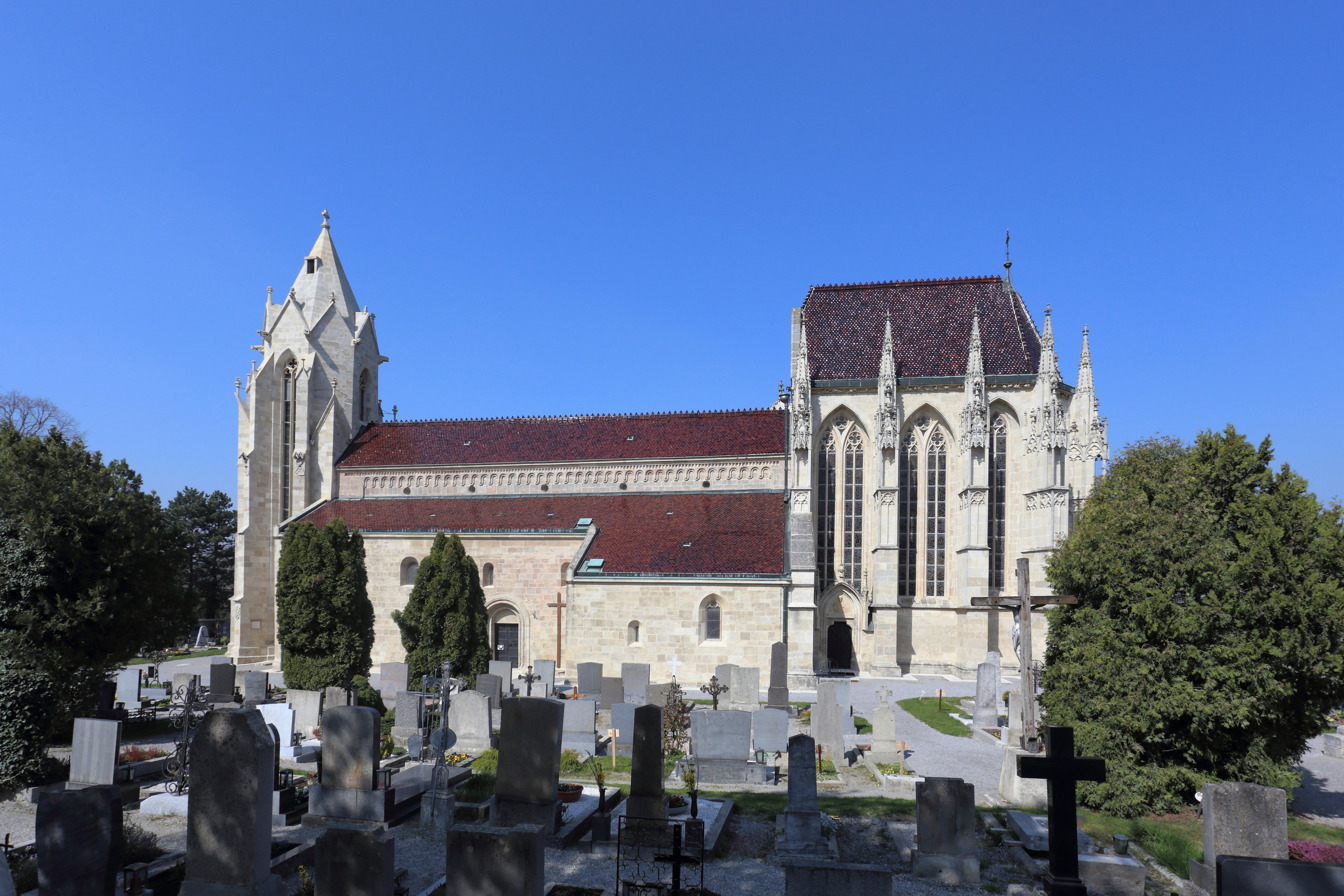
Parish church

The settlement in the Duchy of Austria, located around a medieval castle at the site of the former Roman camp of Carnuntum, was first mentioned in 1297 and received market rights in 1579. The prefix Deutsch- was added to differ it from nearby Altenburg (Óvár) in Hungary. From 1916/17, it was the site of a large longwave and high frequency radio transmitter station, which was dismantled in the 1980s.

In March 1945, numerous Jewish forced labourers were deported on a death march from the south-east wall to Bad Deutsch-Altenburg, where they had to embark up the Danube to Mauthausen concentration camp. A memorial stone marks the site of a mass grave, where exhausted prisoners shot by the security forces were buried.

== Politics ==
Seats in the municipal assembly (Gemeinderat) as of 2010 elections:

- Social Democratic Party of Austria (SPÖ): 7
- Austrian People's Party (ÖVP): 5
- Team Altenburg (Independent): 5
- Wir Altenburger (Independent): 1
- Freedom Party of Austria (FPÖ): 1

== Notable people ==
- Carl Hollitzer (1874—1942), caricaturist, singer and cabaret artist
- Blessed Anton Durcovici (1888—1951), Catholic clergyman and Bishop of Iaşi
- Hannes Swoboda (born 1946), politician
