= Frederick Augustus Starring =

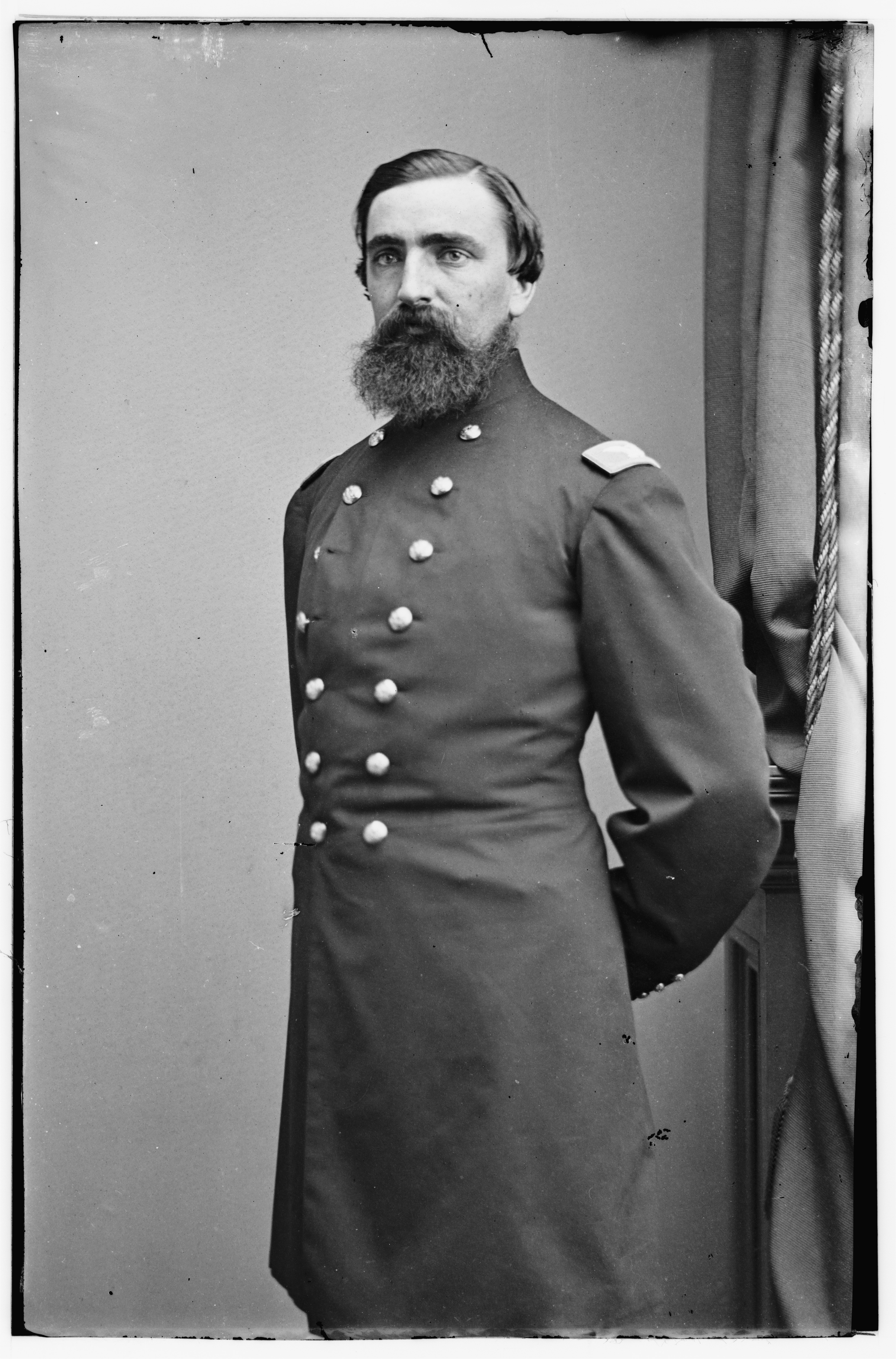
- Born: May 24, 1834; Buffalo, New York
- Died: April 11, 1904 (aged 69); Pasadena, California
- Burial place: Woodlawn Cemetery
- Occupations: Civil engineer, lawyer, military officer
- Spouses: Olivia (Conine) Ellis (m. 1874, divorced) Louisa Perle Whitehouse (m. 1889; died 1903)

General Frederick Augustus Starring (May 24, 1834 – April 11, 1904) was an American civil engineer, lawyer, and soldier. After the American Civil War, he entered public service as an agent for the U.S. Treasury and examined U.S. consular and diplomatic affairs in Europe.

== Biography ==
Frederick Augustus Starring was born in Buffalo on May 24, 1834. His father was civil engineer, Sylvanus Seaman Starring, descended from Dutch pioneers; his mother was Adeline Morton Williams from Fredonia, New York. He was educated at Harvard and also Paris, Heidelberg and Vienna. In 1859 he was admitted to the bar in New York. Before the American Civil War he worked for the Illinois Central Railroad and the Cairo & Fulton Railroad Company. He was also involved with surveying the boundary lines between Arkansas, Texas and the Indian Territory.

At the start of the Civil War, he volunteered to fight with the Union army, being first an aide at the Battle of Bull Run. He was then appointed major in the 46th Illinois Infantry Regiment, after which he served in the 2nd Illinois Artillery and later became colonel of the 72nd Illinois Infantry Regiment. During the war he was involved in numerous actions with the 72nd, including the siege and surrender of Vicksburg. In 1865 he became the provost-marshal general of the Department of the Gulf and in the same year was appointed brevet brigadier general for gallant and meritorious services. He left the army and travelled to Europe, returning to help form the Grand Army of the Republic, an organization for the veterans of the American Civil War who fought for the Union. He became their first inspector general and was also involved with the design of the medal.

Starring took up the post of US diplomatic and consular agent in 1869, visiting consulates in foreign countries and was a special agent for the US Treasury in Europe. He investigated and reported on the market price and dutiable value of steel imported into the United States from Europe. In 1871 he investigated the activities of the Consul General to Egypt, ex-journalist George H. Butler. He was the nephew of General Benjamin F. Butler, who had secured the position for him. Butler's eccentric behaviour whilst in Egypt had been widely reported and led to his dismissal.

Starring married Olivia (Conine) Ellis from Baltimore on November 14, 1874, in St George's, Hanover Square, London. Following a divorce, he remarried in July 1889, at New York City, to Louisa Perle Whitehouse from Farmington. She died in 1903, and Starring died a few months later on April 11, 1904, in Pasadena, California.

During his life he travelled extensively to Africa, India, South America, Europe and beyond. He is buried at Woodlawn Cemetery in The Bronx.
