= Alice Johnson (actress) =

American actress and singer (1860–1914)

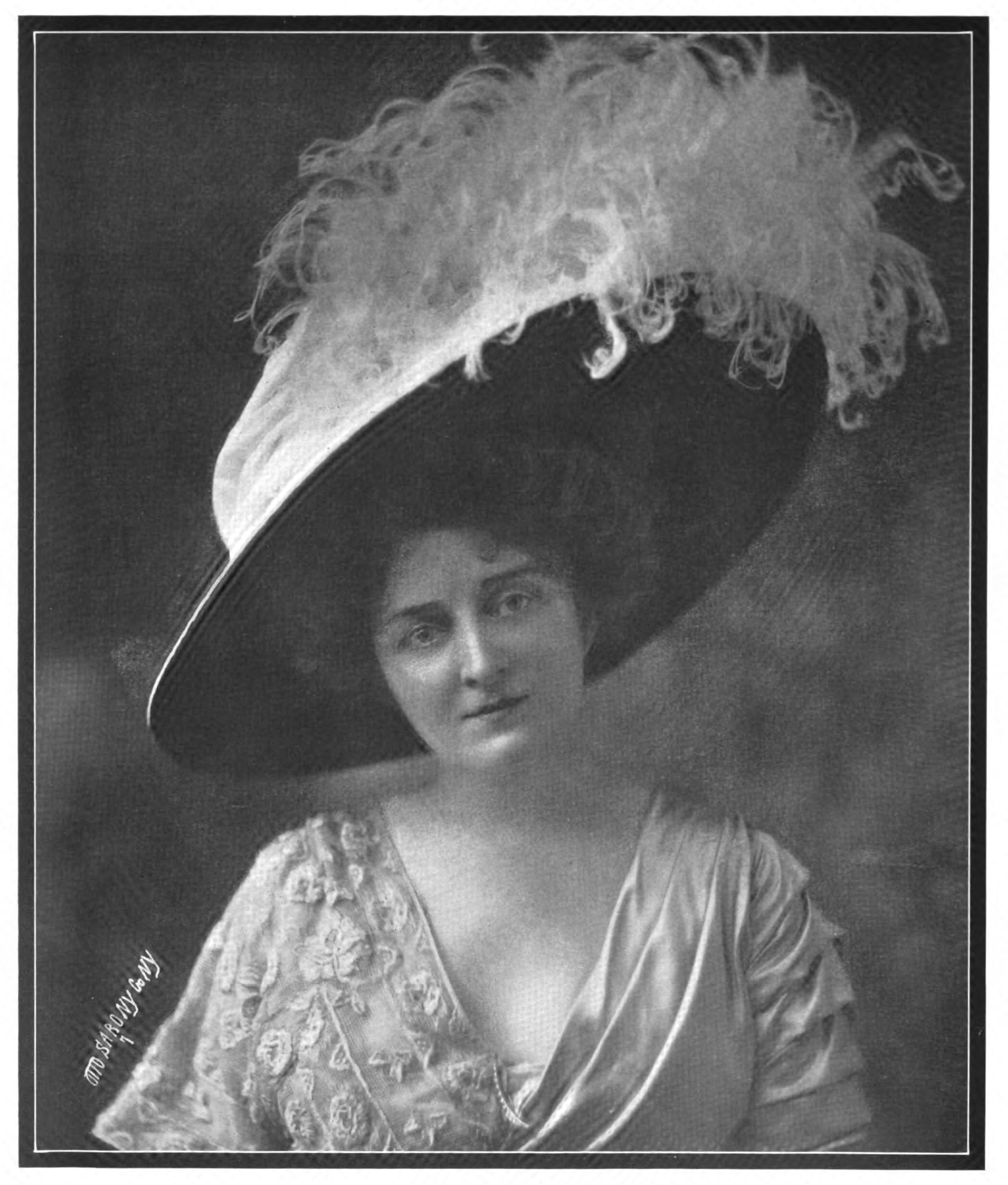
Alice Johnson ca. 1900

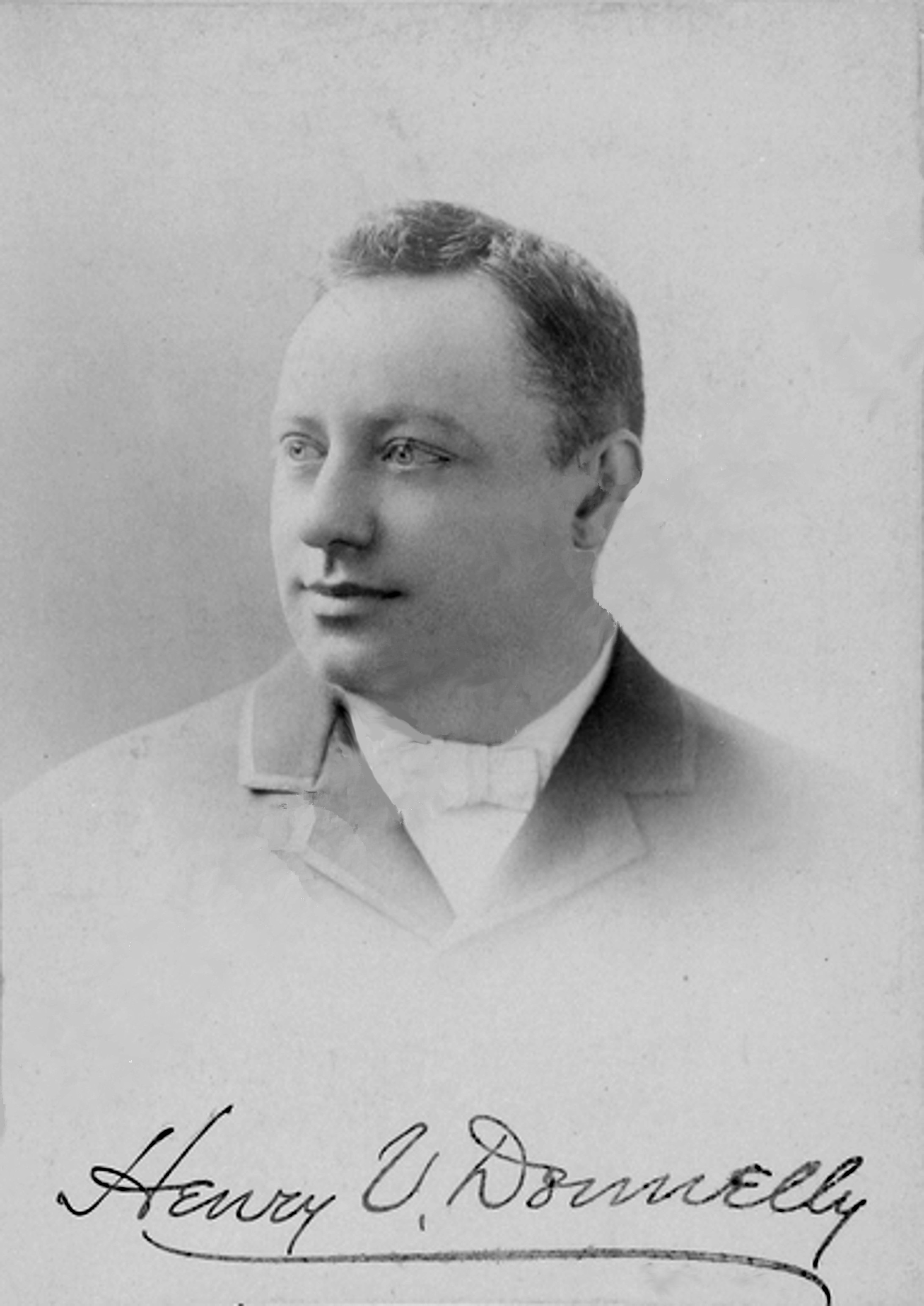
H.V. Donnelly

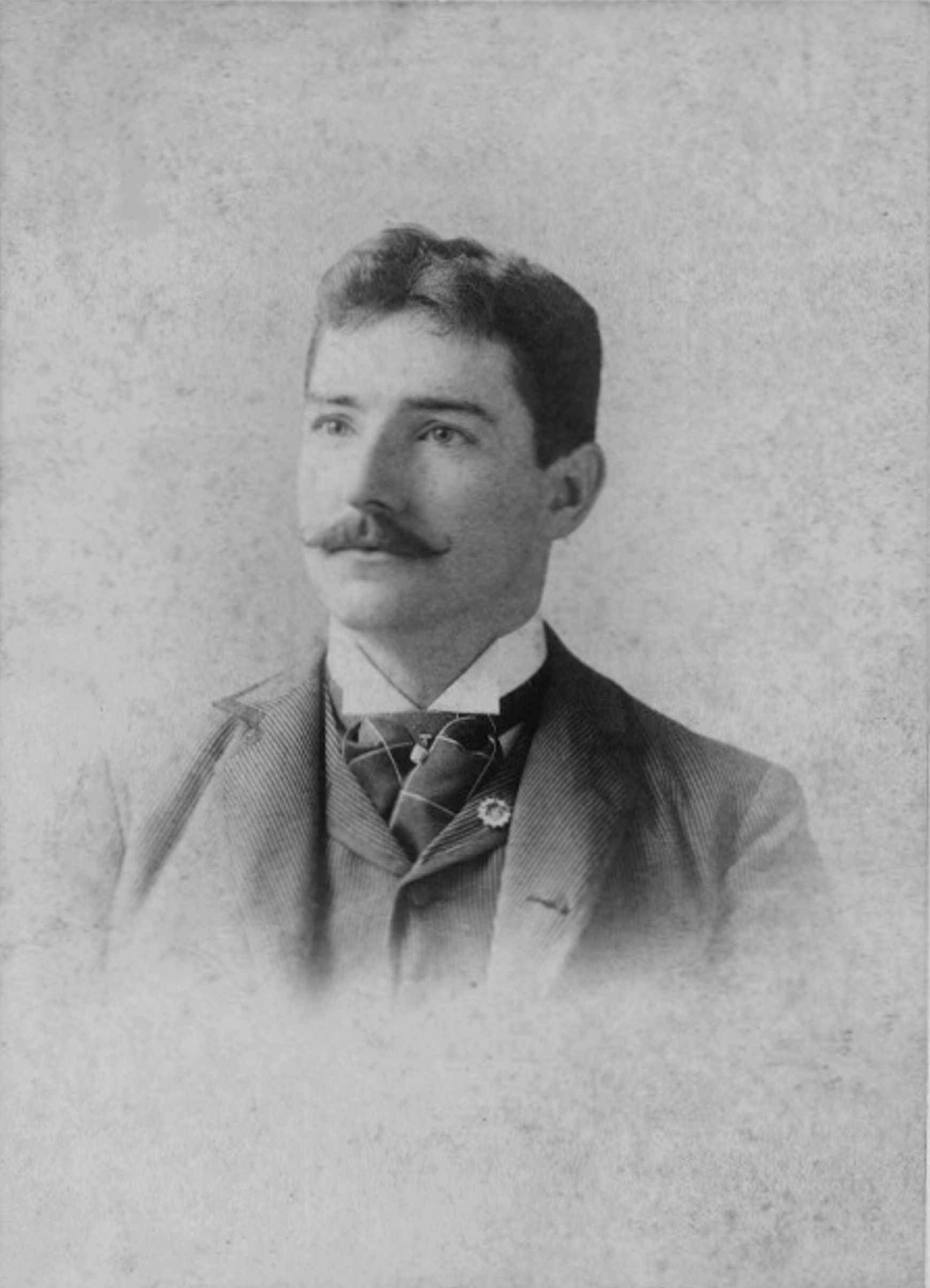
Daniel Frawley

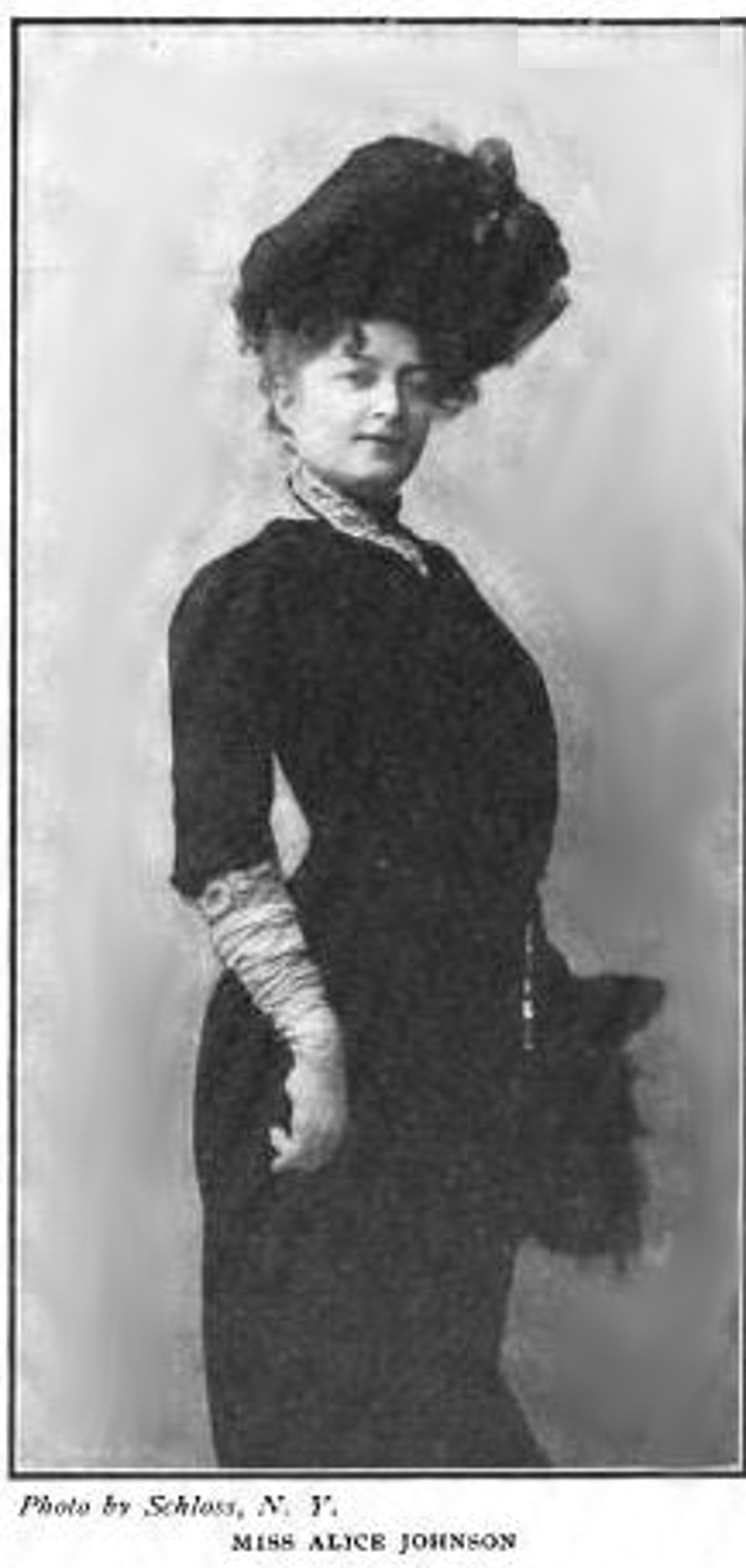
ca.1904

Alice Johnson (born 1860, died New York City, November 25, 1914) was a Broadway actress and singer, active at the beginning of the 20th century. She began her career in the chorus in light opera. She later became a member of the Murray Hill Theatre Stock Company. In a single season she was seen in "no less than thirty roles running the entire gamut of the modern stage." The company was founded by Henry V. Donnelly (1862–1910). The company gave two performances daily and changed the play each week. Alice played everything from Lady Macbeth to Peggy in A Tin Soldier by Temple Bailey.

She was also the leading actress in the Frawley Company, a stock company founded by T. Daniel Frawley in San Francisco, when it was at the zenith of its popularity. She was married to Benjamin Franklin "Frank" Butler, the son of Colonel George Harris Butler and actress Rose Eytinge, until his untimely death in 1904 at the age of thirty-three.

She is buried in the Oak Hill Cemetery in Washington, D.C.

== Selected plays ==
- The Pearl of Pekin (1888) an adaptation of the operetta Fleur-de-Thé by Charles Lecocq
- The Poet and the Puppets (1893) a burlesque adaptation of Lady Windermere's Fan (Note: The show included a Hamlet in hoop skirts, the song "Daddy Wouldn't Buy Me a Bow Wow" and a three-legged dance. The audience hissed and booed its disapproval. (Reference: Thomas Allston Brown (1903) A History of the New York Stage, Dodd, Mead and Company, New York))
- The Sorrows of Satan (1897) adapted from the novel by Marie Corelli
- The Swell Miss Fitzwell (1897) by Henry A. Du Souchet
- The Little Host (1898–99)
- A Divorce Colony (1900) a farce by Sydney Rosenfield, Grand Opera House, San Francisco
- A Friend of the Family (1903) California Theatre, San Francisco
- Mistakes Will Happen (1906)
- The Dear Unfair Sex (1906)
- The Man from Home (1908–09)
- Widow by Proxy (1913)
