= Led Astray =

Play by Dion Boucicault

Led Astray is an 1873 melodramatic play written by Irish playwright Dion Boucicault. It was first performed at the Union Square Theatre on December 6, 1873, and ran for 161 performances. It debuted in London at the Gaiety Theatre in July 1874.

The play featured Rose Eytinge, Charles R. Thorne Jr., Elizabeth Weathersby, and McKee Rankin.

The play is loosely based on La Tentation (1860) by French playwright Octave Feuillet.

== Original Broadway cast ==
- Count Rudolph Chandoce by Charles R. Thorne Jr.
- Baron Mount Gosline by Claude Burroughs
- Armand Chandonce by Rose Eytinge
- La Fontaine by W.H. Wilder
- Robert by W.S. Quiqley
- Suzanne by Elizabeth Weathersby
- Sophie by Kate Holland
- Geo. de Lasparre by McKee Rankin
- Hector Placide by Stuart Robson
- O'Hara by H.W. Montgomery
- Baroness by Emily Mestayer
- Dowager by Marie Wilkins
- Mathilde by Kate Claxton
