= Sol Eytinge Jr. =

American illustrator (1833–1905)

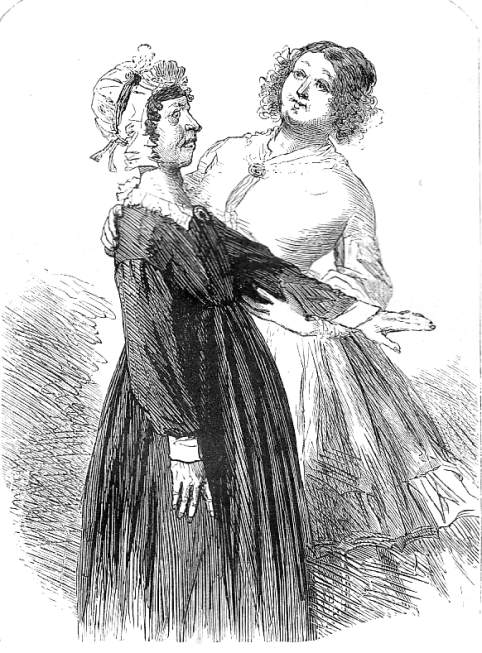
"Flora and Mr. F's aunt", illustration by Sol Eytinge Jr. to Little Dorrit

Solomon Eytinge Jr. (23 October 1833 – 26 March 1905), was an American illustrator of newspapers, journals and books by authors that included Charles Dickens and Alfred, Lord Tennyson.

== Early life ==
His father, Solomon Eytinge, was a Dutch merchant who settled in New York and married an American woman, Mary Ann Miller. Sol Eytinge was born in New York on the 23 October 1833. (Note: The census returns of 1860, 1880 & 1890 indicate Eytinge's place of birth was New York but several references put his place of birth as Philadelphia. Eytinge's mother came from Philadelphia and his father settled in Philadelphia when he first arrived in America.)

== Career ==
By the age of twenty three he was an established staff artist at Frank Leslie's Illustrated Newspaper where he mentored a sixteen-year-old Thomas Nast. Shortly afterwards, he worked for the New York Illustrated News later contributing to the journals Every Saturday and Harper's Weekly. His colleagues at this time included Frank Bellew and the brothers Alfred and William Waud.

Eytinge and his group of friends frequented Charles Pfaff's beer cellar on Broadway and they were part of the Bohemian social scene that existed in New York at this time. Before Pfaff's had opened in 1855, Eytinge was involved with a circle of writers and artists who referred to themselves as the Ornithorhynchus Club. One friend, the writer William Winter, described Eytinge as a "man of original and deeply interesting character, an artist of exceptional facility, possessed of a fine imagination and great warmth of feeling.... In his prime as a draughtsman he was distinguished for the felicity of his invention, the richness of his humor, and the tenderness of his pathos. He had a keen wit and was the soul of kindness and mirth”.

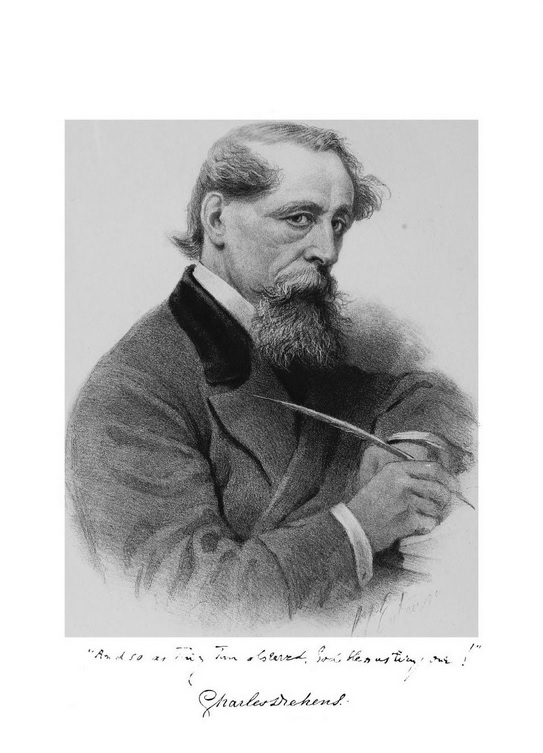
Charles Dickens From a Lithograph by Sol Eytinge Jr.

In 1867 Sol Eytinge was asked by publishers Field, Osgood & Co. of Boston to prepare a series of drawings to illustrate the work of Charles Dickens, who was due to tour America. These were published in a series of books referred to as the Diamond Edition. Dickens liked and approved the drawings and the two men got on well enough for Eytinge to be able to sketch a portrait of the author. One of Eytinge's illustrations for A Christmas Carol was of Bob Cratchit with Tiny Tim on his shoulder; this iconic portrayal was the first time a drawing showing this scene had been published. Eytinge visited Dickens in England who then invited him to see the darker side of London life. The illustrations for the Dickens books were later published in the Every Saturday journal.

Eytinge was a prolific illustrator and his work was included in books for authors such as Louisa May Alcott, Robert Browning, Oliver Wendell Holmes, James Russell Lowell, Washington Irving, Edgar Allan Poe, Annie Edwards and John Greenleaf Whittier plus many others.

== Family ==
In 1858 he married divorcee, Margaret (Winship) Wyckoff, who had two children from her previous marriage, one of whom took the name of her new step father and became actress Pearl Eytinge. Eytinge's wife was a published author and wrote under the names of Margaret Winship Eytinge, Madge Elliot, Bell Thorne and Allie Vernon.

Several of Eytinge's relatives were connected with the theatre: Samuel D. Eytinge (Note: Samuel D. Eytinge (1829-1859), married Emily Kelly Moss, sister of Theodore Moss, treasurer and later manager of Wallack's Theatre. Emily had a son from her first marriage who took his stepfather's name to become actor, Walter Eytinge (1854-1893).) and Rose Eytinge were cousins and his brother Charles D. Eytinge was a renowned “reader”. Another brother, Harry, was a producer and actor. His nephew, Dennis Miller Bunker, was an impressionist painter.

One brother, Clarence Eytinge (1835-1900), followed his family into the arts. During the Civil War, he joined the United States Department of State as clerk and worked in the short-lived Immigration Bureau. He went on to serve as Secretary of the United States Legation at Lima, Peru.

Eytinge died in Bayonne, New Jersey on 26 March 1905 and is buried in Bayview-New York Bay Cemetery.
