= USS Shepherd Knapp =

Gunboat of the United States Navy

History

United States
- Acquired: 28 August 1861 at New York City
- In service: 1861
- Fate: Wrecked 18 May 1863

General characteristics
- Displacement: 838 tons
- Length: 160 ft 10 in (49.02 m)
- Beam: 33 ft 8 in (10.26 m)
- Draft: 13 ft (4.0 m) (Light)
- Depth of hold: 22 ft 3 in (6.78 m)
- Propulsion: sail
- Complement: 93
- Armament: eight guns

USS Shepherd Knapp was a large (838-ton) ship with eight guns, purchased by the Union Navy during the beginning of the American Civil War.

With her eight guns and a crew of 93, she was employed by the Union Navy as a heavy gunboat outfitted to pursue major Confederate States of America blockade runners, especially Confederate Captain Raphael Semmes. Her limited ability as a sailing ship in pursuit of steam-powered adversaries was eventually recognised and a different strategy adopted: she became a decoy, disguised as an unarmed merchant ship sailing in areas where Confederate raiders were known to operate.

During the course of her fruitless searches for Semmes, she ran aground on a reef near Haiti and was abandoned.

== Service history ==
Shepherd Knapp—a ship-rigged sailing vessel—was purchased at New York City on 28 August 1861 from Laurence Giles & Co.

Since the logs of Shepherd Knapp are missing, many details of her career are not known. However, records of correspondence between Naval Command and her captain were published in Official Records of the Union and Confederate Navies in the War of the Rebellion. Her commanding officer was Acting Volunteer Lieutenant Henry S. Eytinge, who was ordered on 1 November 1861 to cruise in the West Indies seeking to capture or destroy any "vessels of the rebels" he might encounter. The special object of his attention was the Confederate commerce raider, CSS Sumter, which had been preying on Union shipping since early summer. After a long cruise in which she never quite caught up with Capt. Raphael Semmes and his elusive steamer, Shepherd Knapp returned to New York City on 17 April 1862. One month later she was ordered to the blockade squadron at Charleston, where she remained for the next six months, four of which were guarding St Helena Sound, where she captured the blockade runner Fanny Laurie (4 September 1862).

In November, Shepherd Knapp was back in New York and by early February 1863 she was heading to the West Indies seeking Confederate ships, especially CSS Alabama. As a sailing ship it was unlikely that Shepherd Knapp could overhaul a steam-powered raider such as CSS Alabama, powered by two 300 hp engines. However, a letter from Charles Wilkes, acting rear admiral of the West Indies Squadron, to the Secretary of the Navy Gideon Welles dated 26 February 1863, shows that their plan was for the USS Shepherd Knapp to disguise as a merchantman and act as decoy. By following a trade route they hoped to draw in a raider so that they could engage at close quarters.

After cruising in the Caribbean for over three and one-half months, Shepherd Knapp struck a coral reef off Cap-Haïtien on 18 May 1863 and was abandoned. All equipment, including her guns, was salvaged.
