= Margaret Winship Eytinge =

American writer (1832–1916)

- Born: Margaret Winship; July 1832; Manhattan, New York, U.S.
- Died: January 26, 1916 (aged 83); Bayonne, New Jersey, U.S.
- Resting place: Bayview – New York Bay Cemetery
- Spouse(s): James B. Wyckoff (divorced); Sol Eytinge Jr.
- Children: James S. Wyckoff (son); Pearl Eytinge (née Wyckoff) (daughter)
- Writing career
- Pen name: Madge Elliot; Allie Vernon; Bell Thorne

Margaret Winship Eytinge (July 1832 – January 26, 1916) was an American author, often associated with children’s short stories and poems who was based in New York. She wrote under the pen-names of Madge Elliot, Bell Thorne and Allie Vernon. She was the mother of actress Pearl Eytinge and wife of illustrator Sol Eytinge Jr.

Her maiden name was Winship and although information about her early life is limited, there is one reference that says her father was a butcher. (Note: In Thomas Butler Gunn's diaries, Margaret is invariably referred to as Allie Vernon - her pen name.) This would probably make her the great-granddaughter of Ebenezer Winship. He was from Lexington and fought in the American Revolutionary War before moving to New York with six sons, all of whom were butchers. (Note: Captain Ebenezer Winship from Lexington fought in the American Revolutionary War and later moved to New York with six of his sons, Ebenezer, John, Samuel, Daniel, Thomas and Jonathan. The family can be traced back to Edward Winship who settled in America from England in 1635) She attended Rutgers Female College and by the age of eighteen she was married with her first child - James. Her daughter, Pearl, was born in about 1855. Her husband, James B. Wyckoff, was working in "dry goods" but later trained to be a physician. At some period in the 1850s the couple divorced; James continued to practise in New York for a period before moving to Jerseyville, Illinois where he had family connections and where he died in 1864.

By the age of fifteen Margaret's work was published under the pen-name of Allie Vernon. Later she had work published in the New York Picayune under the name of Bell Thorne. She mixed with editors, writers and illustrators, eventually meeting and marrying the illustrator Sol Eytinge Jr. Margaret’s daughter, Pearl, lived with them and took the name of her step-father. Margaret’s son became a teacher before moving to Illinois and taking up a new career in horticulture. The Eytinges did not have children of their own.

A compendium of her children's stories was published under the title of The ball of the vegetables and other stories in prose and verse. An electronic version of this can be viewed at The Baldwin Library of Historical Children’s Literature web-page. A list of other works may be viewed at the Lehigh University web-site. Her work was published in many American newspapers and periodicals such as Harper's Magazine and Our Young Folk as well as being syndicated to countries such as Britain and Australia.

She died on January 26, 1916.
