= 72nd Illinois Infantry Regiment =

72nd Regiment Illinois Volunteer; "1st Board of Trade Regt"
- Reconstruction of the National flag
- Active: August 23, 1862, to August 7, 1865
- Country: United States
- Allegiance: Union
- Branch: Infantry
- Engagements: Battle of Champion's Hill; Siege of Vicksburg; Battle of Franklin; Battle of Nashville

The 72nd Regiment Illinois Volunteer Infantry, known as the "First Chicago Board of Trade Regiment" was an infantry regiment that served in the Union Army during the American Civil War.

== Service ==
72nd Regiment Illinois was organized at Chicago, Illinois and mustered into Federal service on August 23, 1862.

The regiment carried 3 flags made in Kentucky. One was a national flag with the inscription "Presented by S. T. Suit, of Kentucky, to the Board of Trade Regiment of Chicago." in the central stripe in gold. The other flags were 2 guidons made of silk.

The regiment was discharged from service on August 7, 1865.

== Total strength and casualties ==
The regiment suffered 7 officers and 79 enlisted men who were killed in action or mortally wounded and 3 officers and 145 enlisted men who died of disease, for a total of 234 fatalities.

== Commanders ==
- Colonel Frederick Augustus Starring - Mustered out with the regiment.

== See also ==
- List of Illinois Civil War Units
- Illinois in the American Civil War
