= Pussy =

Term with multiple meanings

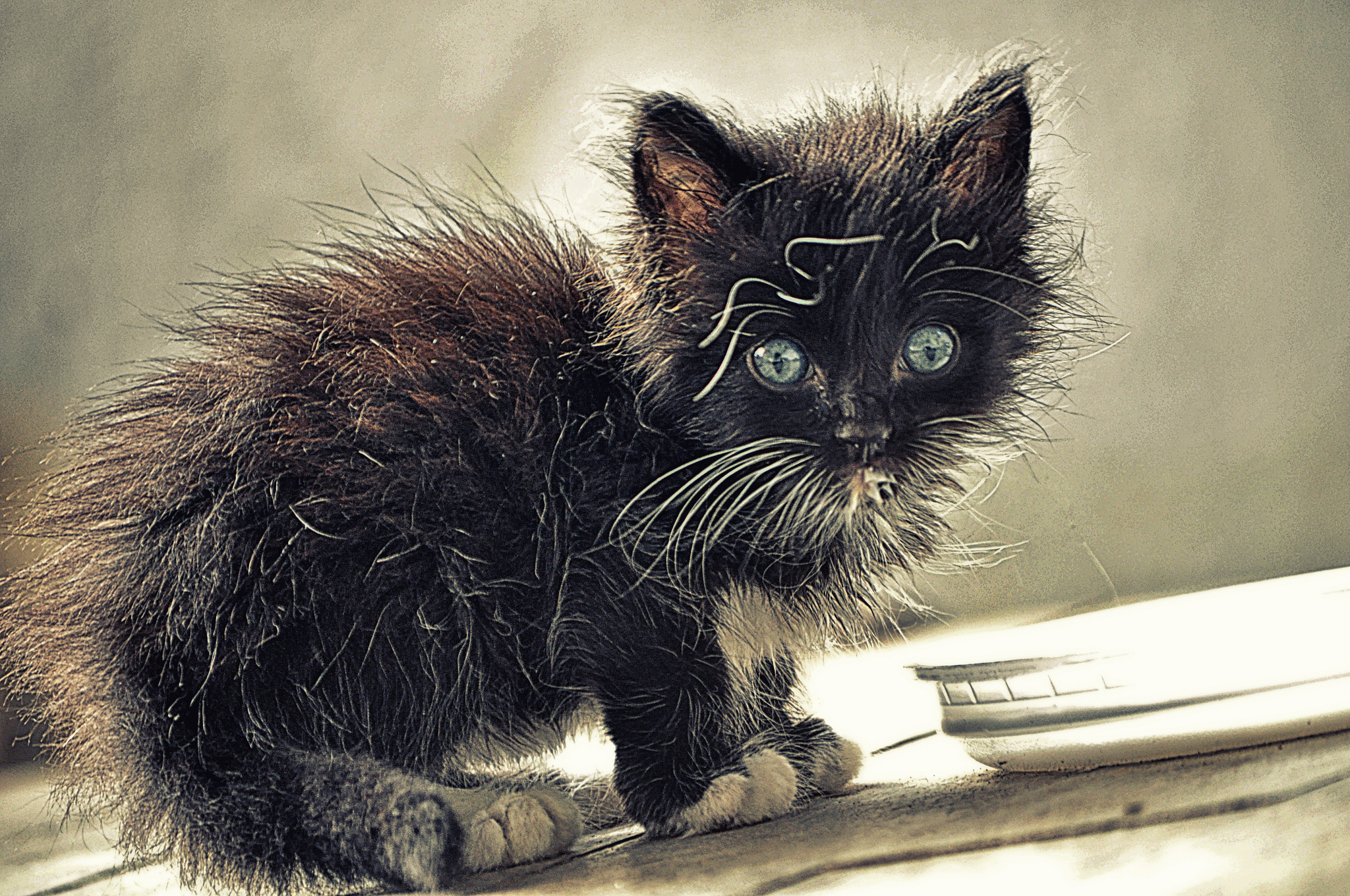
The word pussy historically refers to cats.

Pussy (/ˈpʊsi/) is an English noun, adjective, and—occasionally—verb. It has several meanings, as slang, as euphemism, and as vulgarity. Most commonly, it is used as a noun with the meaning "cat", or "coward" or "weakling". In slang, it can mean "vulva", "vagina", or by synecdoche, "sexual intercourse with a woman". Because of its multiple senses including both innocent and vulgar connotations, pussy is often the subject of double entendre. The ultimate etymology of the word is not clear. Several different senses of the word have different histories or origins. The earliest records of pussy are in the 19th century, meaning something fluffy.

== Etymology ==
The noun pussy meaning "cat" comes from the Modern English word puss, a conventional name or term of address for a cat. Cognates are common to several Germanic languages, including Dutch poes and Middle Low German pūse, which are also used to call a cat. The word puss is attested in English as early as 1533. Earlier etymology is uncertain, but similar words exist in other European languages, including Lithuanian puižė and Irish puisín, both traditional calls to attract a cat.

The words puss and derived forms pussy and pusscat were extended to refer to girls or women by the seventeenth century. This sense of pussy was used to refer specifically to genitalia by the eighteenth century, and from there further extended to refer to sexual intercourse involving a woman by the twentieth century. Webster's Third International Dictionary suggests that pussy in the sense of "vulva" may be connected to Old Norse pūss and Old English pusa, meaning 'pocket' or 'purse'.

Meanings of the verb relate to the common noun senses, including "to act like a cat", "to act like a coward", or "to have sex with a woman". Adjective meanings are likewise related to the noun.

=== Similar words ===
The medieval French word pucelle 'maiden, virgin' is not related to the English word. It is attested in Old French from the ninth century, and likely derives from Latin puella 'girl' or pulla 'pullet, young female chicken'.

The word pusillanimous is unrelated to pussy.

The homograph pussy, pronounced /ˈpʌsi/, means "containing pus". Medical professionals will often use the synonym purulent to avoid pussy's other meanings.

Pussy is also a variant spelling of pursy or pursive, obsolete words for 'fat, pot-bellied, short of breath, broken-winded, asthmatic (of a horse)'.

== Uses ==
=== Cat and similar ===
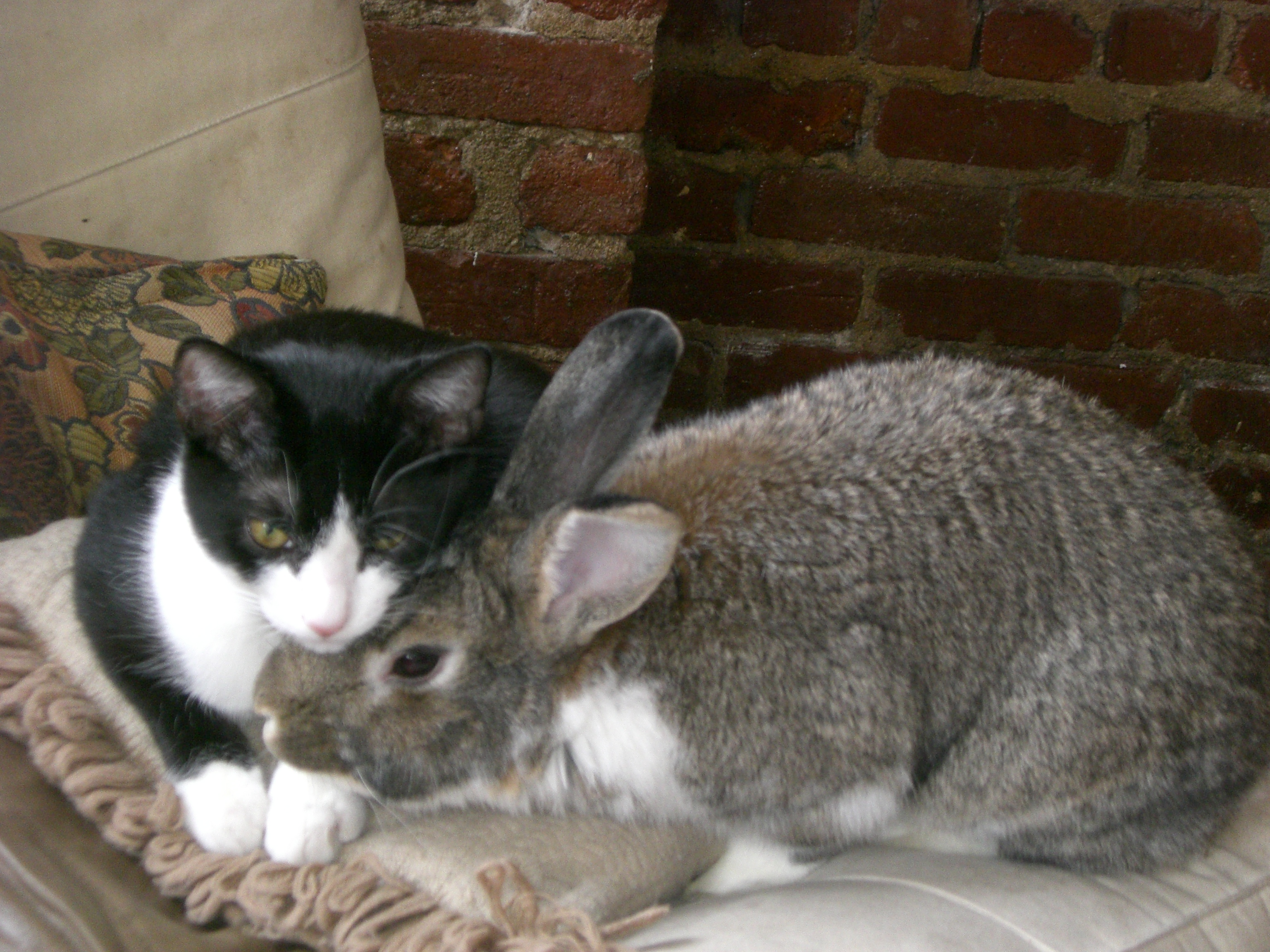
The word pussy refers to cats as well as other animals, including rabbits and hares.

Both in English and in German, puss was used as a "call-name" for cats, but in English, pussy was used as a synonym for the word cat in other uses as well. In addition to cats, the word was also used for rabbits and hares. In the 19th century, the meaning was extended to anything soft and furry. Pussy willow, for example, is a name applied to various species in the genus Salix with furry catkins. In thieves' cant the word pussy means a "fur coat".

The Oxford English Dictionary gives as the first meaning of the noun: "Chiefly colloq[uial]. A girl or woman exhibiting characteristics associated with a cat, esp[ecially] sweetness or amiability. Freq[uently] used as a pet name or as a term of endearment." The examples it cites from the mid-19th to mid-20th centuries are not sexual. Another example, not cited by the OED, is one of the main characters of E. Nesbit's Five Children and It - Jane, nicknamed Pussy by her siblings.

The verb pussyfoot, meaning to walk softly or to speak in an evasive or cautious manner, may come from the adjective pussy-footed, "having a cat-like foot", or directly from the noun pussyfoot. This word, first attested in the late nineteenth century, is related to both the "cat" and the "woman" meanings of pussy.

=== Female genitalia ===
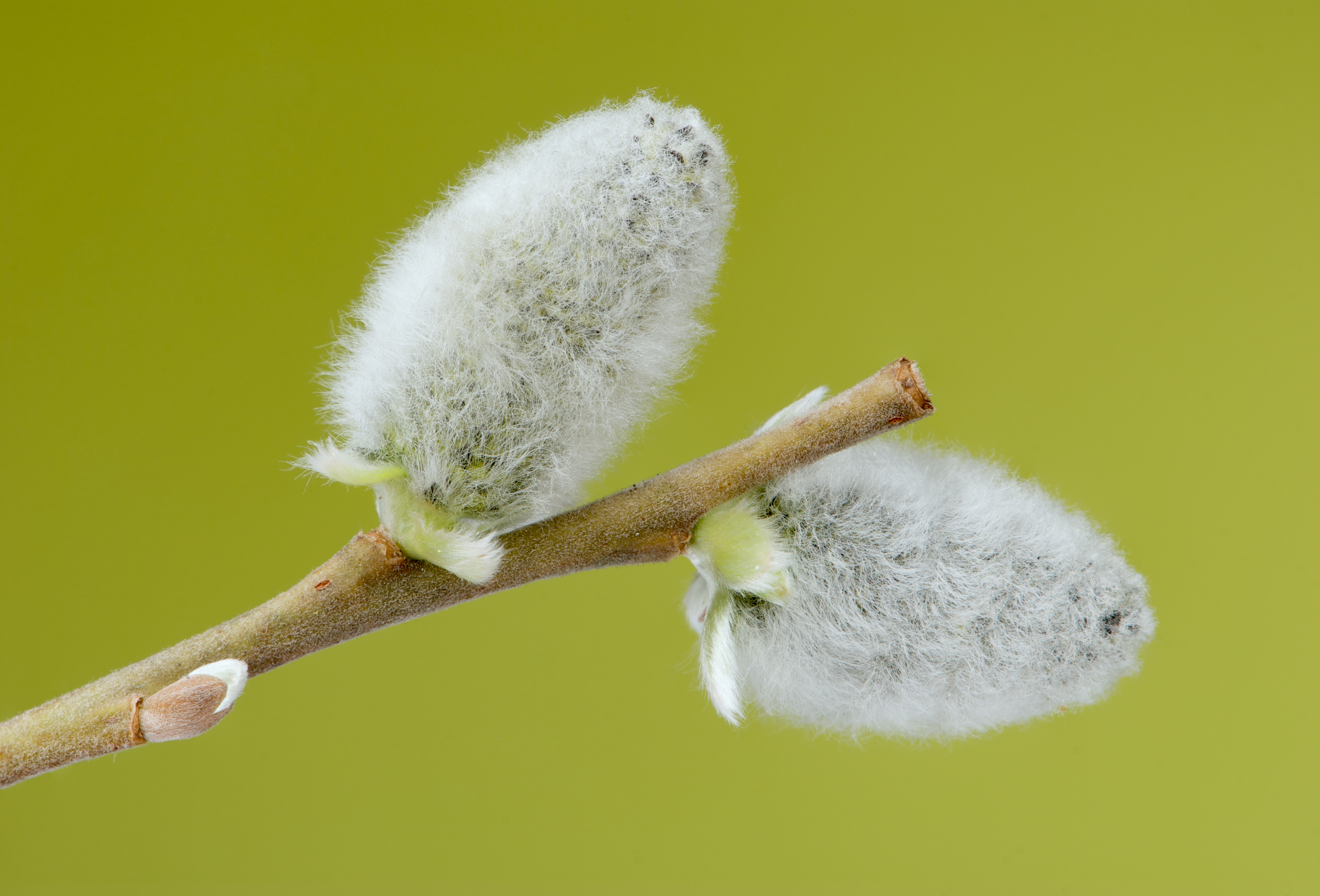
Male catkins from a pussy willow

In contemporary English, use of the word pussy to refer to women is considered derogatory and demeaning, treating women as sexual objects. As a reference to genitals or to sexual intercourse, the word is considered vulgar slang. Studies find the word is used more commonly in conversations among men than in groups of women or mixed-gender groups, though subjects report using pussy more often than other slang terms for female genitals. There are women seeking to reclaim the word to symbolise sexual pleasure, trust in their bodies (e.g. around childbirth). and empowerment.

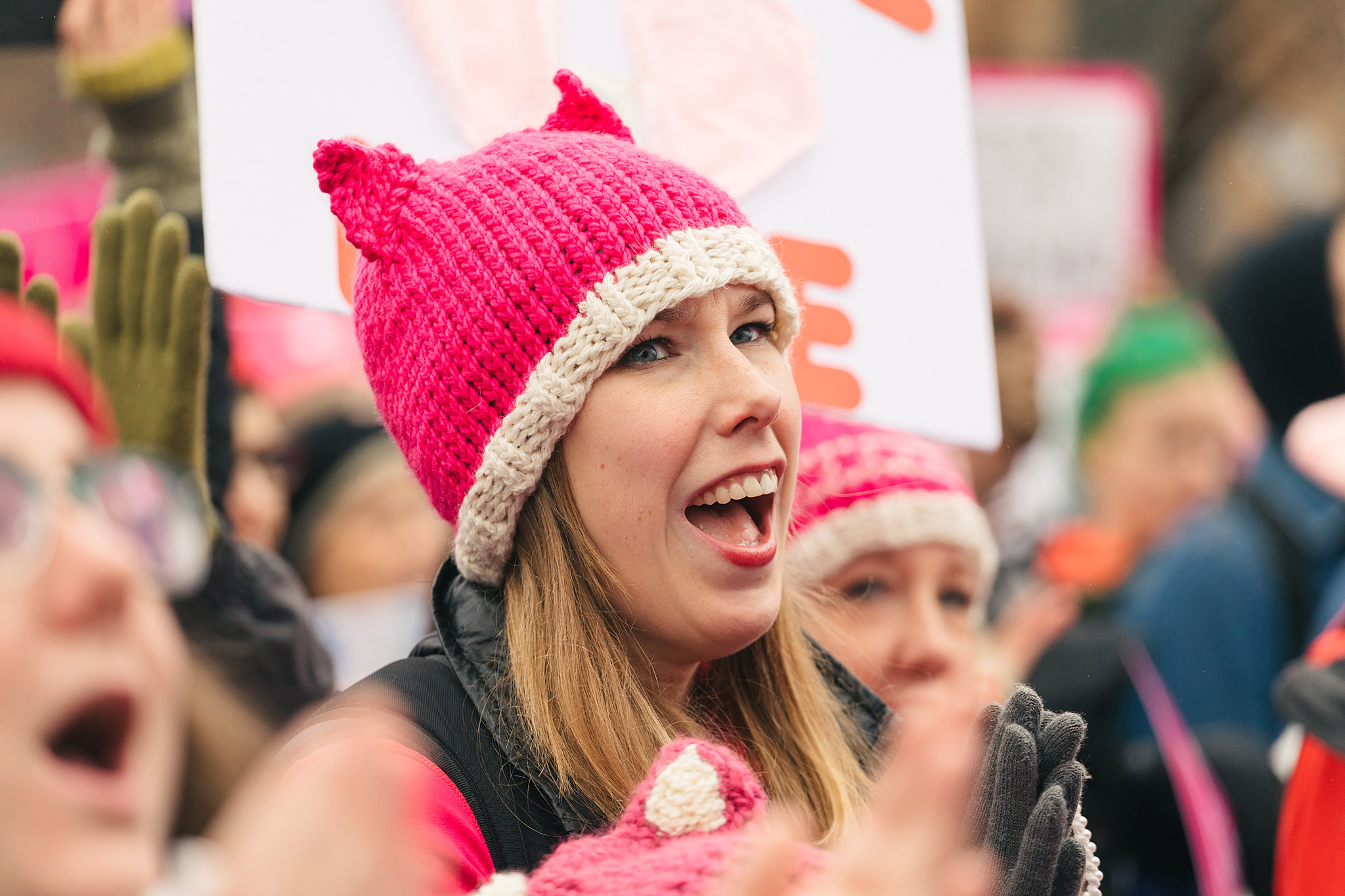
Woman wearing a "pussyhat"

Donald Trump's use of the word to describe his interactions as a celebrity with women ("You can do anything. Grab them by the pussy") on the Access Hollywood tape provoked strong reactions by media figures and politicians across the political spectrum. After the tape was released in October 2016, The Guardian reported that the slogan "Pussy grabs back" (sometimes accompanied by an image of a snarling cat) had become a "rallying cry for female rage against Trump". Pink "pussyhats" (knitted caps with cat-like ears) were a notable feature of the Women's March protests held in Washington and worldwide the day after Trump's first inauguration as President of the United States. The name attempts to reclaim the derogatory term and is never used as an anatomical representation.

Words referring to cats are used as vulgar slang for female genitals in some other European languages as well. Examples include German Muschi (literally "house cat"), French chatte ("female cat", also used to refer to sexual intercourse), Dutch poes ("puss"), Portuguese rata (literally "female rat"), and Norwegian mus ("mouse"), which are also animal terms used as vulgar slang for women's genitals.

=== Weakness ===
The word pussy is also used in a derogatory sense to mean cowardly, weak, or easily fatigued. The Collins Dictionary says: "(taboo, slang, mainly US) an ineffectual or timid person." It may refer to a male who is not considered sufficiently masculine, as in: "The coach calls us pussies."

Men who are dominated by women (particularly by their partners or spouses and at one time referred to as "hen-pecked"; see pecking order) can be referred to as pussy-whipped (or simply whipped in slightly more polite society or media). This may be used simply to denigrate a man who is contented in a relationship. The hyphenated phrase is parsed as "whipped by pussy", a manipulative relationship dynamic wherein a female deliberately or subconsciously withholds sexual intercourse to coerce the male into surrendering power in other aspects of the relationship.

== Wordplay between meanings ==
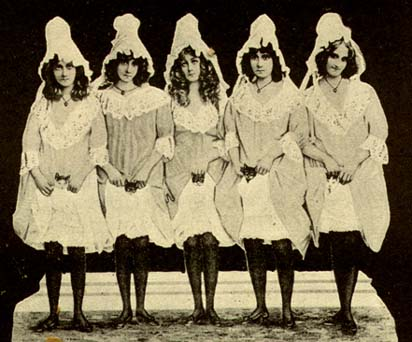
The Barrison Sisters lift their dresses to show a live kitten, a double entendre of "pussy".

Pussy is one of a large number of English words that has both erotic and non-erotic meanings. Such double entendres have long been used in the creation of sexual humor. This double meaning of "pussy" has been used for over a hundred years by performers, including the late-19th-century vaudeville act the Barrison Sisters, who performed the notorious routine "Do You Want To See My Pussy?" in which they raised their skirts to reveal live kittens.

In the British comedy Are You Being Served? the character Mrs. Slocombe often expressed concern for the welfare of her pussy. The double entendre made every reference to her cat seem to be a salacious and therefore humorous reference to her vulva.

In the 2002 film 8 Mile, a rapper insults his rivals by including the line, "How can six dicks be pussies?" The line relies on double meanings of both dick (either "contemptible person" or "male genitalia") and pussy ("weak" or "female genitalia"). Such word play presents a challenge for translators of the film.

Pussy Riot is a Russian radical feminist punk rock collective that stages illegal events in Moscow protesting against President Vladimir Putin and the status of women in Russian society. Band member "Kot" says that she knows how the word is used in English, and that it is also used in Russian as term of endearment for little girls. These various meanings create a tension with the word "riot", which the group likes.

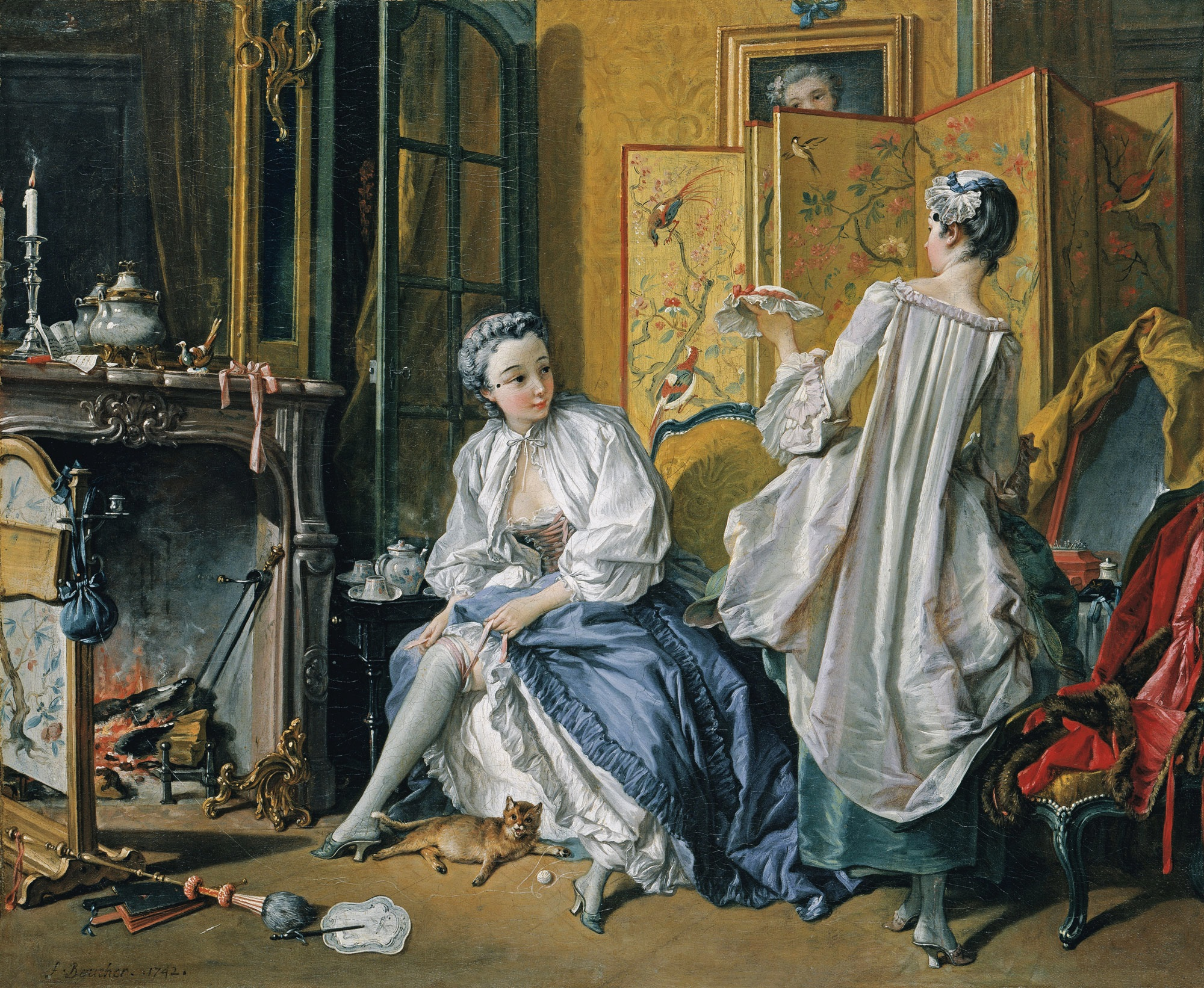
An 18th century painting by François Boucher depicting a woman with a cat between her legs

In 2017 Planned Parenthood released a series of short videos on YouTube about female sexual health, with the overall title "How to take care of your pussy". Instead of the word "pussy" being shown or spoken, a cat appears instead. The visuals consist mainly of cats, playing on the popularity of cat videos, with a voiceover by Sasheer Zamata. Refinery29 called it "a pretty genius metaphor" and Metro said: "If there are two things left in this world that are inherently wonderful, it's cats and vaginas. Don't argue. It's true.[...] It makes sense, then, that Planned Parenthood has decided to combine the two to create a truly splendid video series." The series has been shortlisted for a Shorty Award.

== See also ==
- Cunt, another old vulgarism for the vulva
- -ussy, a derivative suffix
