= George Harris Butler =

American diplomat

George Harris Butler (1840 – May 11, 1886) the nephew of a Massachusetts Congressman, was appointed Consul General in Alexandria, Egypt, in 1870. He dismissed all consular agents, auctioned off their commissions, and purchased dancing girls. Shortly before his recall in 1872, he was involved in a brawl with three former Confederate officers.

== Background and career ==
Butler was born in Massachusetts but spent his formative years in California. During the Civil War he was a lieutenant in the 10th US infantry and later a quartermaster and ordnance officer, resigning in 1863. He was a theatre critic and talented writer, contributing to various publications including Wilkes' Spirit of the Times. His drinking bouts often got him into trouble despite the best efforts of his friends and family. In 1870 his uncle, Congressman General Benjamin Franklin Butler, who had some influence with President Ulysses S. Grant, was instrumental in getting him a job as US Consul General in Alexandria, Egypt, as a non-career appointee.

Butler presented his credentials on the 2 June 1870 and took up residence in Alexandria with his wife, actress Rose Eytinge. He employed an assistant by the name of Strologo, dismissed all of the US consular agents in the area and auctioning off their positions to the highest bidders. A missionary working in Alexandria, Reverend David Strang, attempted to intercede on behalf of the dismissed agents and eventually wrote to Ulysses S. Grant about the "corrupt management of consular affairs". Strang also wrote that Butler and his companions demanded entertainment from dancing women performing "in puris naturalibus".

Butler came into conflict with several of the American officers serving in the Egyptian army. These were predominantly ex-Confederate soldiers/sailors, recruited by Thaddeus P. Mott and Charles Pomeroy Stone, who were helping the ruling Khedive to modernise his army. The Khedive also considered appointing the former Confederate General, P. G. T. Beauregard, as his commander, but Butler counselled against this and the Khedive withdrew the offer. Some years later Butler explained that "there wasn't room in Egypt for Beauregard and myself at the same time". A fight between Butler and three of the American officers occurred in July 1872; shots were fired and one of the soldiers was wounded. In fear of his life, Butler fled Egypt.

The activities at the consulate were investigated by General F. A. Starring. Strogolo claimed that his boss Butler was often drunk, took bribes, opened mail addressed to others and instigated the shooting of the army officer. However, Strogolo also admitted taking his share of the bribes and was implicated in an assault on the missionary, Reverend Strang.

In 1875 Butler owned and edited a New York journal called The Arcadian; the venture lasted less than a year. In 1877 he was appointed Special Postal Agent for the Black Hills territory based in Deadwood. Travelling to his new position on the train, he became very drunk and made a nuisance of himself. News of this got back to his boss who promptly sacked him. Some years later he was the Forage Master at Fort Keogh but this time resigned because it was too cold. His marriage to Jewish-American actress Rose Eytinge ended in divorce in 1882; they had two children. Their son Benjamin Franklin "Frank" Butler (1871–1904) married actress Alice Johnson, but died an early death.

== Final years ==
He became a sorry figure, drunk for days at a time, often living rough. He was even incarcerated in an asylum for a time to try and stop him drinking but celebrated on his release by getting drunk. During these final years in Washington one lady stuck by him and tried to protect him. She was Josephine Chesney who kept her attachment secret, but it became known after Butler's death that they had been married for several years.
