= Colombe's Birthday =

Stageplay by Robert Browning

- Written by: Robert Browning
- Original language: English

Premiere
- Date premiered: 1853

Colombe's Birthday is a play written by Robert Browning. In 1843, he was approached by William Macready's rival Charles Kean to write a play for him. Browning took up the offer and finished the play in 1844. In March of that year, he read the finished play to Kean and his wife, Ellen Tree, and it was accepted for production. However, they could not promise its performance until 1845 and forced Browning not to publish it until then. Despite this request, the play was published five weeks later as the next number of his Bells and Pomegranates series. The play was finally produced in 1853 through the influence of Helen Faucit, who starred in the first production as the title character.

== Characters ==
- Colombe of Ravenstein – Duchess of Juliers and Cleves
- Sabyne – Colombe's attendant
- Adolf – Colombe's attendant
- Guibert – a courtier
- Gaucelme - a courtier
- Maufroy – a courtier
- Clugnet – a courtier
- Valence – advocate of Cleves
- Prince Berthold – claimant to the Duchy
- Melchior – Berthold's confidant

== Plot ==
Colombe has been Duchess of Juliers and Cleves for a year. It is her birthday and the anniversary of her coronation to the Duchy. Prince Berthold, the claimant to the throne, arrives and attempts to take over the Duchy as its rightful heir. The poor advocate of Cleves (Valance) tells Colombe the problems occurring in the city, but stands by her when Berthold attempts to take her throne. When called upon, however, Valance admits that Berthhold has the stronger claim. The prince suggests marriage as the solution, but does not pretend to love Colombe. Valance offers her his love instead, describing how it is better to have love than power, and she agrees. In choosing this, she relinquishes the Duchy's throne to Berthold.

== Critical analysis ==
Clyde de Loache Ryals argued that the play "shows that love and power cannot coexist" as Colombe chooses to be with her love interest Valence instead of keeping power in the Duchy. Describing it as "the closest that Browning wrote to political propaganda", Isobel Armstrong stated that the play can be taken as "anti-Corn Law" writing in the way that it promotes the welfare of the townspeople against the ruling class, here represented by the struggle between Valence and Colombe to rule the Duchy fairly. Arthur Symons also remarked on the way that Browning writes in a "deliberate and reflective" way. He noted that the play's focus is on the "purely personal and psychological bearings of the act", unlike Browning's other plays which appear "fiery" and "thrilling."

== Adaptations ==
In 1894, Rose Eytinge produced an adaptation of the play and condensed it into a single act. It was performed by Julia Marlowe at the Hollis Street Theatre.
