= Gertrude Barrison =

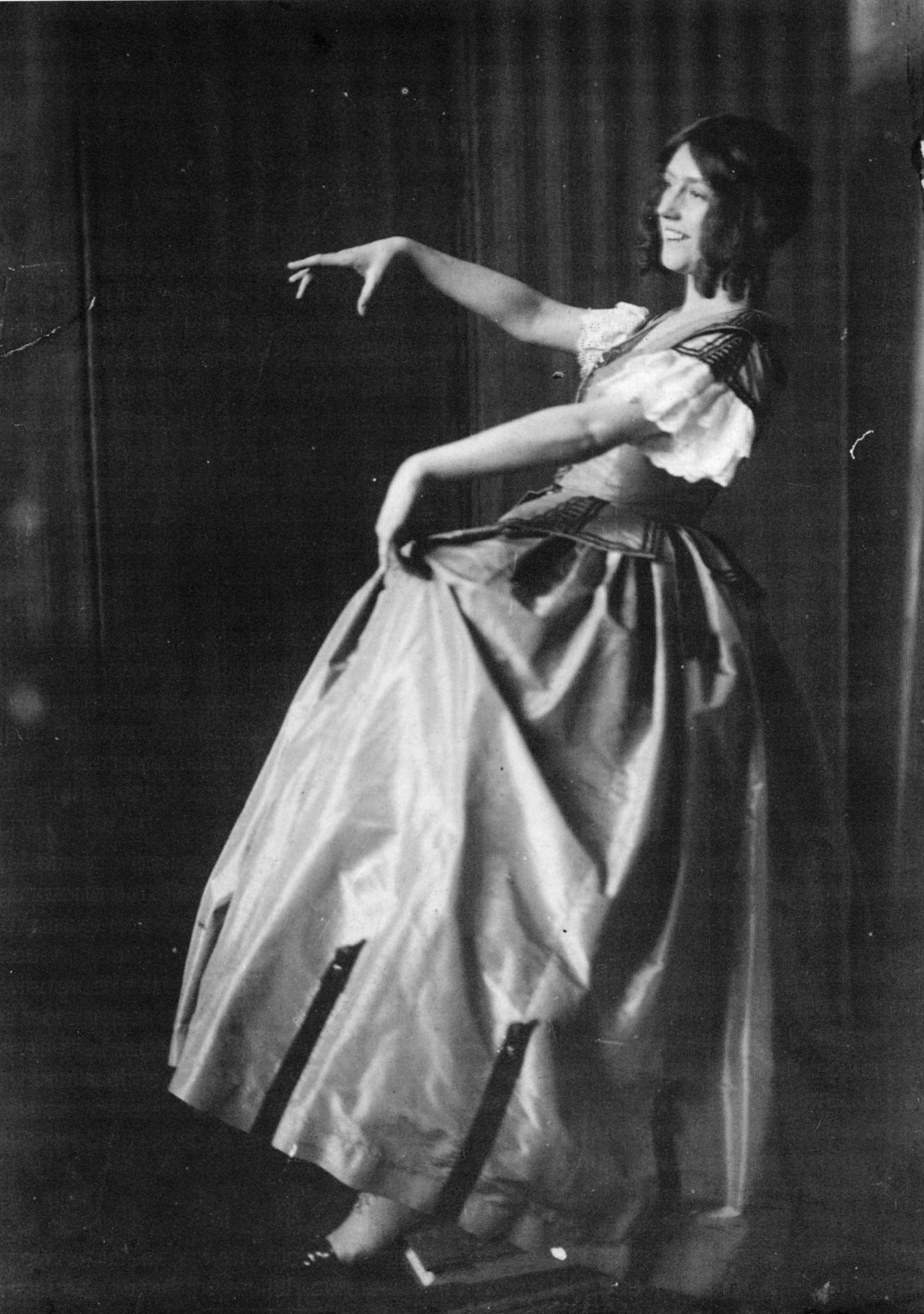
Gertrude Barrison (1906)

Gertrude Barrison, birth name Gertrud Bareisen, (1880–1946) was a Danish-born singer, dancer and risqué cabaret performer who emigrated to the United States with her family as a child. In the late 1890s, she gained considerable success performing with her four older sisters Lona, Sophia, Inger and Olga, initially in the United States, but later in European cities including Paris, Berlin and Budapest. Together they were known as the Five Sisters Barrison. After they separated, Gertrude continued her career as a dancer and dance teacher based in Vienna. She married the Austrian singer and artist Carl Hollitzer with whom she performed at the city's Nachtlicht and Fledermaus cabarets. They divorced without children in 1910. Barrison continued teaching and presenting solo performances in Europe, eventually moving to Copenhagen in later life.

== Biography ==
Born on 5 February 1880 in the Valby district of Copenhagen, Gertrud Bareisen was the daughter of Erika Vilhelmine Petrea Bareisen née Corvinius (1851–1905) and Niels Adolph Hansenius Bareisen (born 1849). In 1886, she emigrated with her parents and sisters to the United States where she was raised in New York. While still a child, she appeared with her sisters on the stage, in particular dancing a gavotte at the German-language Amberg Theatre, a performance which received wide acclaim. When she was nine, she played Eva in Uncle Tom's Cabin at the Daly's Theatre.

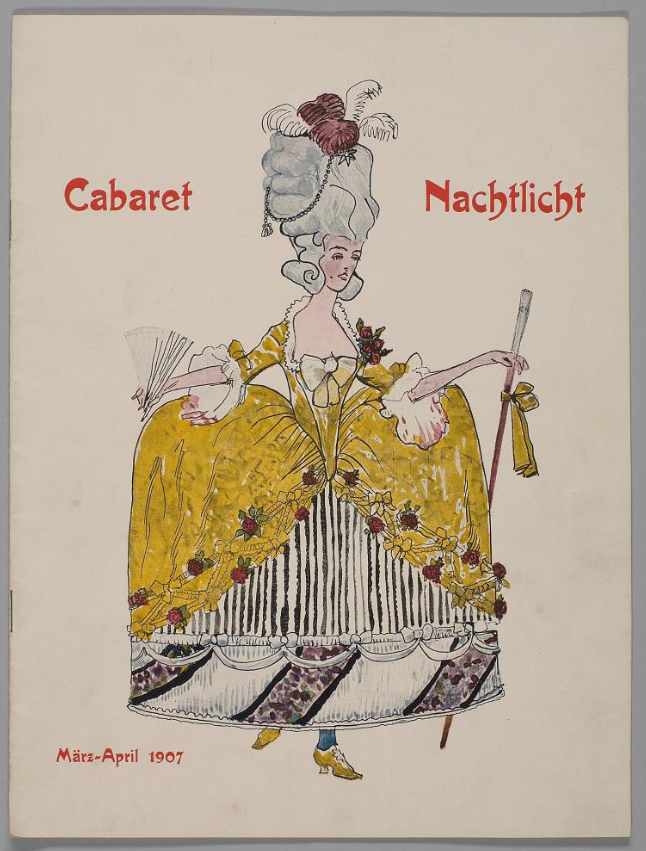
Gertrude Barrison, Nachtlicht cabaret Vienna, caricature by Carl Leopold Hollitzer (1907)

She first appeared as one of "The Five Sisters Barrison" in Chicago in connection with the 1893 World's Columbian Exposition. Over the next four years, she appeared with her sisters in the cabarets and music halls of Europe and North America, including the Casino de Paris and the Folies Bergère. They also toured the French provinces and appeared in Brussels at the Palais d'Éte immediately before the fire of 11 June 1894. Their next destination was Berlin where they entertained full houses at the Wintergarten for the next eight months. After performing in Lübeck, they appeared in London and again in Paris and Berlin as well as in Budapest before returning to New York. The group finally broke up in 1897.

For a time, she then appeared together with her sister Inger, performing for the first time in Moscow. When the two decided to go their own ways, Gertrude settled in Dresden where she studied painting at the art academy. Two years later, she moved to Vienna where she once again returned to the stage, this time as "Miss Gertrude" at the Nachtlicht night club as a solo dancer. Her dances included the gavotte she had learnt as a child at the Amberg in New York. In the Nachtlicht, she met the Swedish singer Anna Norrie (1860–1957) who invited her to join her in performances at the Odd Fellows Mansion in Copenhagen. She had hoped to appear incognito but was recognized by a journalist as a former member of the Five Sisters Barrison. As a result, she then appeared simply as Gertrude Barrison. Now dancing Mozart minuets or Strauss's Kathinka polka, she toured Germany's major variety theatres in Berlin, Hamburg, Düsseldorf and Hanover. Thereafter she established a dance school in Vienna. She continued to teach and contribute to modern dance in Vienna until the 1920s.

Gertrude Barrison died in Copenhagen in 1946. She was the last of the Barrison sisters to die.
