= Man Under Cover =

1922 film

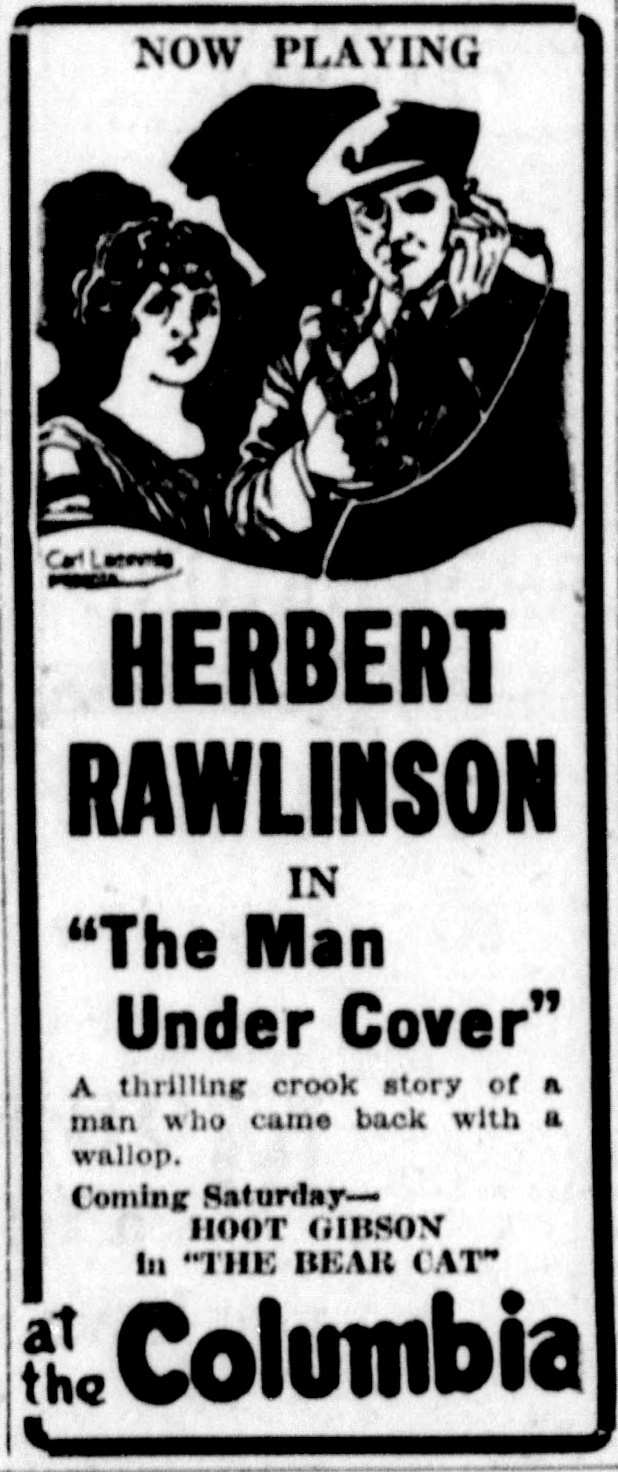
- Newspaper advertisement
- Directed by: Tod Browning
- Written by: Louis Victor Eytinge; Harvey Gates
- Starring: Herbert Rawlinson; George Hernandez
- Cinematography: Virgil Miller
- Distributed by: Universal Film Manufacturing Company
- Release date: April 10, 1922
- Running time: 5 reels
- Country: United States
- Language: Silent (English intertitles)

Man Under Cover is a 1922 American silent crime film directed by Tod Browning and starring Herbert Rawlinson and George Hernandez. A copy of Man Under Cover is housed at the Museum of Modern Art.

== Plot ==
As described in a film magazine, Paul Porter (Rawlinson) and his pal Daddy Moffat (Hernandez), who are two crooks, arrive at Paul's hometown to find that Holt Langdon (Pring), a cashier at the bank and an old comrade of Paul's, is in trouble. Holt needs $25,000. Paul and Dad decide to "crack" the local bank that night and help Holt out.

When the two enter the bank that night they discover Holt's body—he has killed himself. They also find evidence showing that Holt was short $25,000 in his cashier's account. Because of Holt's friendship and because of his sister Margaret, who was Paul's boyhood sweetheart, they "frame" the bank to rearrange matters to make it appear to have been a hold-up where Holt died defending the bank's funds.

The circumstances of the event impress upon Paul so deeply that he decides to leave his life of crime and to go straight. He saves Margaret from financial embarrassment by buying the small newspaper that she runs. Paul and Daddy then discover that two confidence men are operating in the town, collecting thousands of dollars in a fake oil well scheme. They decide to outwit the crooks.

With the aid of Colonel Culpepper (Marks), a lawyer, they start a fake well themselves and stage a typical gusher blowout. The two crooks, fooled into thinking that there is actually oil under the town's land, buy out their well at a high figure. Paul is thus able to return to the townspeople their swindled savings stolen by the foiled confidence men. Paul then tells Margaret the whole story. After learning of her brother's tragedy, she forgives Paul for his prior misdeeds. The two find happiness together.

== Cast ==
- Herbert Rawlinson as Paul Porter
- George Hernandez as Daddy Moffat
- William Courtright as Mayor Harper (credited as William Courtwright)
- George Webb as Jones Wiley
- Edwin B. Tilton as 'Coal Oil' Chase (credited as Edwin Booth Tilton)
- Gerald Pring as Holt Langdon
- Barbara Bedford as Margaret Langdon
- Willis Marks as Colonel Culpepper
- Betty Eliason as Kiddie
- Betty Stone as Kiddie

== Production ==
Louis Victor Eytinge wrote the screenplay for the film while serving a life sentence for murder in an Arizona prison.
