= Every Saturday =

Every Saturday (1866–1874) was an American literary magazine published in Boston, Massachusetts. It was edited by Thomas Bailey Aldrich and published by Ticknor and Fields (1866–1868); Fields, Osgood, & Co. (mid-1868–1870); James R. Osgood & Co. (1871–1873); and H. O. Houghton & Co. (1874).

Every Saturday featured work by C. G. Bush, Wilkie Collins, F. O. C. Darley, Charles Dickens, J.W. Ehninger, Sol Eytinge Jr., Harry Fenn, Alfred Fredericks, Thomas Hardy, J.J. Harley, W.J. Hennessy, Winslow Homer, Augustus Hoppin, Ralph Keeler, S.S. Kilburn, Granville Perkins, W.L. Sheppard, Alfred Tennyson, Alfred Waud and others.

== Gallery ==
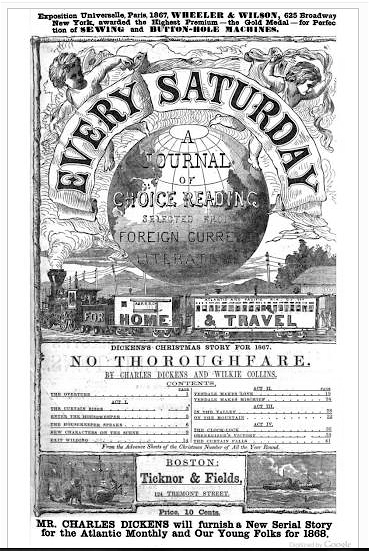
Every Saturday, Christmas 1867 issue, with story by Charles Dickens and Wilkie Collins

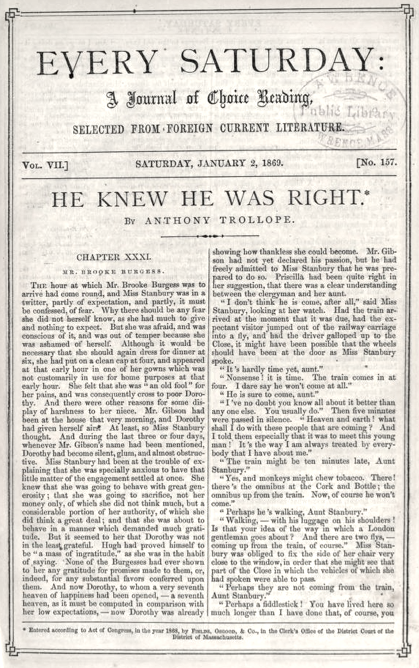
Every Saturday, 1869, with story by Anthony Trollope

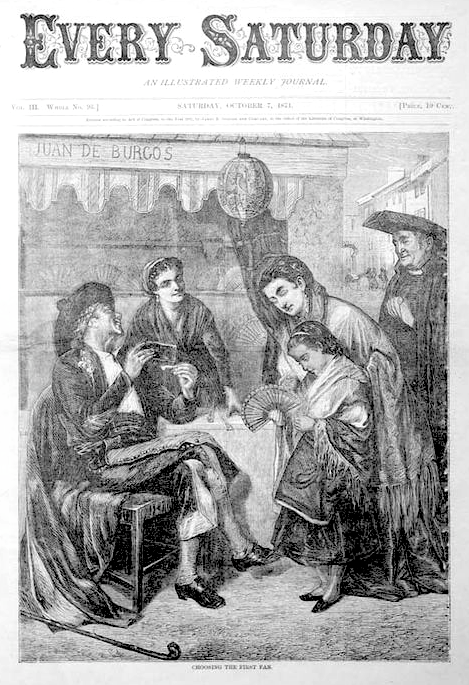
1871

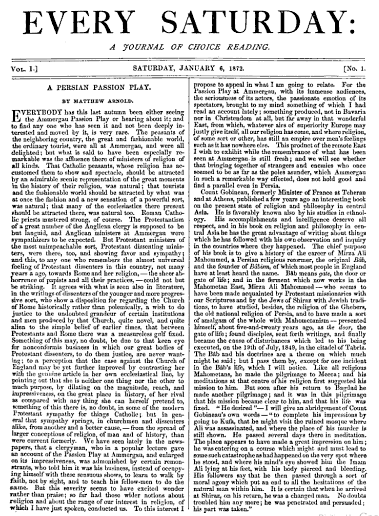
1872

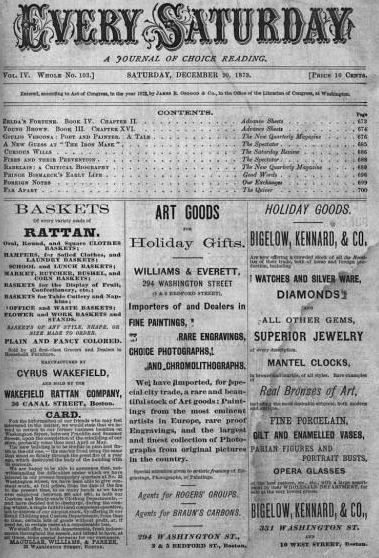
1873
