= Pearl Eytinge =

American actress

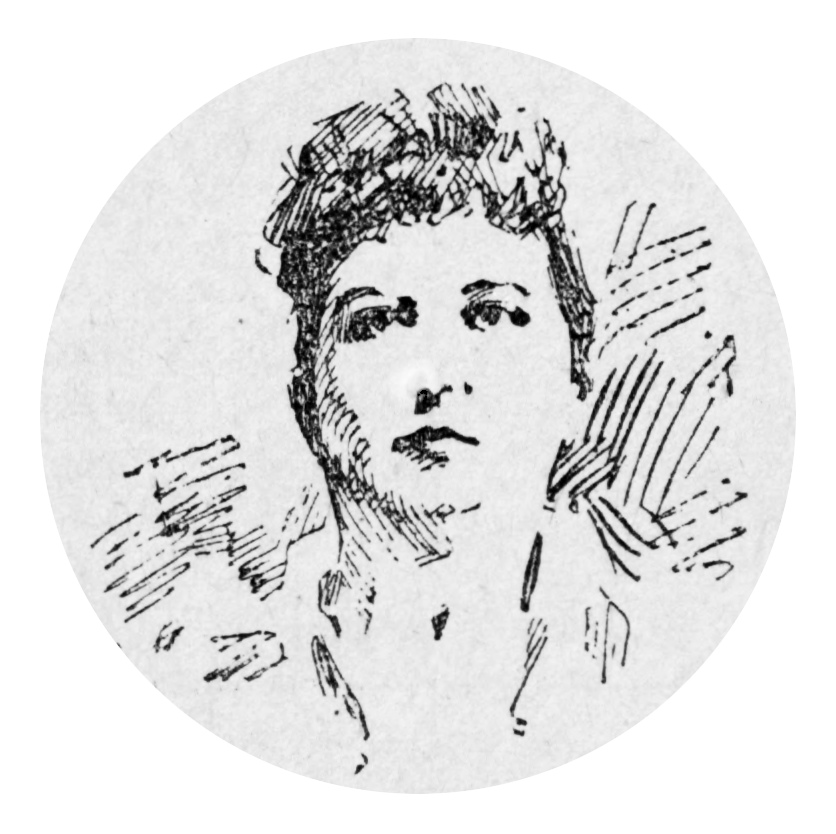
Pearl Eytinge

Pearl Eytinge (née Wyckoff; 1854–1914) was a New York-born actress, author, producer, playwright and activist who once said "There is no vice on earth of which I have not partaken". Her addiction to drink and drugs ended her stage career and it was said of her that: "Pearl Eytinge the women slew Pearl Eytinge the artist". In later years she lectured on the dangers of drug taking.

== Family ==
When Pearl’s mother, Margaret Winship, met and later married Sol Eytinge, she had two children from previous relationships. Her son, James S. Wyckoff, kept the name of his biological father, James B. Wyckoff, whilst Pearl adopted the name of her new step-father. The Eytinge family had settled in America from the Netherlands in the first half of the 19th century, and many of them were connected with the arts – actors, writers and illustrators – the most famous being Sol’s cousin, actress Rose Eytinge. Sol was an illustrator who associated with the New York bohemian set of the period and worked with authors such as Charles Dickens. Pearl’s mother was also part of the bohemian scene, and a published author, writing under the names of Margaret Eytinge, Madge Elliot, Bell Thorne and Allie Vernon.

== Early career ==
At the age of sixteen Pearl was writing short stories of her own for Our Young Folks, an illustrated magazine for boys and girls. From an early age she also gave recitals and poetry readings; she was a superb elocutionist with a rich voice. She started on the professional stage in 1875, working at the Park Theatre in productions including Davy Crockett and Mighty Dollar. Later she had seasons at Wallack's Theatre and worked in Dion Boucicault’s company.

== Marriages ==
In the readers’ letter page of the Our Young Folk magazine dated 1871, volume VII, the editor wrote that Pearl had married at the age of sixteen. Ten years later she married again and described herself on the licence as “widow”. This second marriage was to Joseph Watkins Yard on the 25 May 1881 in St Giles in the Fields church, London. Yard was 22 and over the age of consent, but when his family found out about the union they strongly objected and a divorce followed. Pearl later said that she accepted a payment from the Yard family for not opposing it. Pearl and Yard – who graduated as a doctor – secretly married again in 1884, but this ended in acrimonious circumstances when Yard discovered that Pearl had made the event public. At first, when questioned by the newspapers, he denied that he had remarried her, but when confronted with the evidence, he made the excuse that he had not been sober. Ten years later on the 1 June 1891, Yard married Josephine Marie Siedler in St Martin-in-the-Fields church, London. He later became involved with mining in Mexico, remarried in 1907 to Mary Ryan and died in El Paso in 1941.

== Productive period ==
In 1881/2 Pearl toured with plays Brentwood and Coming Thro the Rye, however, the productions lost money. Her manager at this time was Alexander Russell Webb, an ex-newspaper proprietor and editor. By 1884 there were reports of her taking drugs – opium and morphine – plus concerns for her health. After a lull in her acting career, her prospects revived in 1888 when she came under the management of William Fleron (Born Copenhagen, 1858). He was another newspaper man who described himself as an advanced socialist. Whilst in London he had links to the social-revolutionary party and revolutionary groups. In 1887 he became involved in seeking clemency for the condemned men involved in the Haymarket affair, a workers rally in Chicago that ended in violence and the death of many, including seven policemen. He failed and four men were hanged, but in July 1888 he helped Pearl make a plea on behalf of Chiara Cignarale, an Italian immigrant who had shot and killed her abusive husband, Antonio. She had been sentenced to death and Pearl successfully made an impassioned appeal to Governor Hill in Albany to have the sentence commuted.

Fleron next had to rescue Pearl’s manuscripts from her landlady, a Mrs Benas, who was holding them as security against an outstanding bill of $120. These documents included Pearl’s first play Two Women; Fleron tried to snatch them back and ended up in jail, but was released next day. In 1889 Pearl published her novel Velvet Vice. A year later she appeared in the stage adaption of The Clemenceau Case. This was a story by Alexandre Dumas (fils), translated by Pearl’s manager, Fleron. Her appearance in the play was not well received and she was quickly replaced. Pearl and Fleron continued to work together and some newspapers indicated that they were in a relationship. In 1891 she wrote the play Vivian and adapted Amelie Rives story The Quick or the Dead, whilst he wrote and produced Elysium, an adaption of Mon Oncle Barbassou, by Mario Uchard. Pearl played Madame Barbassou and contributed lyrics. She also discovered and promoted the Danish Barrison Sisters, writing a comedietta for them called Mr. Cupid. Fleron went on to manage the sisters and later married the eldest of them, Lona.

== Spiritualism ==
A literary critic of the New York Herald, James Lauren Ford, recounted an anecdote in his book, Forty-odd Years in the Literary Shop, about Pearl and her association with Madame Diss Debar (also known as Swami Laura Horos). Diss Debar, who purported to be a spiritualist, was a charlatan who preyed on the recently bereaved, and in particularly those of wealth. She set up séances with various tricks to fool those participating, and Pearl participated in some of these charades. At one séance Pearl met Robert Augustus Chesebrough, whose wife had died in 1887. Chesebrough, who had made his wealth from the invention and development of Vaseline was, like Pearl, a writer and a friendship developed between the two of them. In 1891 Chesebrough provided a house for Pearl in New York at 209 East Forty-eighth street at his expense.

In 1888 Madame Diss Debar was convicted of conspiracy to extort money from Luther R. Marsh, a recently bereaved lawyer of New York, and served six months in prison.

== Final years ==
In January 1896 Pearl was rushed to hospital following a drug overdose, and was not expected to live. She recovered, but was back in hospital later that year with alcoholic and morphine poisoning. Over the next few years she made attempts to return to the stage but the drug problem continued, even after she announced she had been cured. She heard a sermon from the evangelist Dwight L. Moody and sought his advice and found comfort in her final years, but reports indicated she slipped into madness, before dying in Atlantic City in 1914.

Her step-cousin, Louis Victor Eytinge, on trial for murder in 1907 entered a plea of insanity, based on the fabrication that Pearl was his sister, and had died insane in Bellevue Hospital. The fact that she was still alive at this time and was not even a blood relative was an indication of how far she had dropped from public view in her final years.
