= South-east wall =

Nazi German fortification and forced labor

Coordinates: 47°17′N 16°12′E

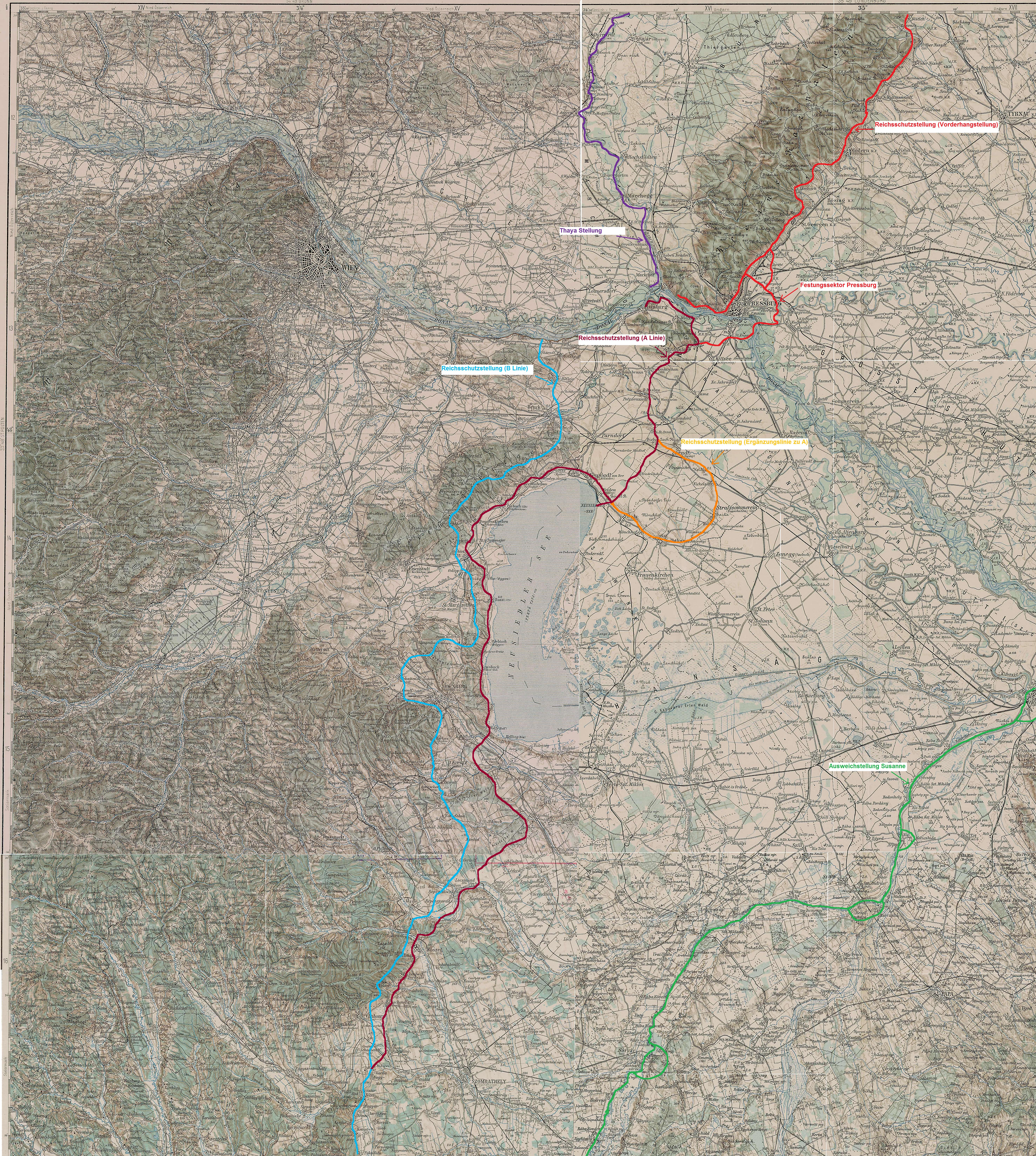
Approximate location of South-east wall fortifications, 1944/45

The South-east wall (German: Südostwall; also known as the Reichsschutzstellung, 'Reich protection position') was a system of fortifications planned by Nazi Germany in the late stages of World War II to extend along the Little Carpathians and Lake Neusiedl southwards to the Drava (Drau) river. Not a wall in the true sense of the word, the South-east wall was rather a series of German batteries and anti-tank ditches built at strategic locations alongside the southeastern border of the German Reich in 1944/45 with the intention of stopping the Red Army.

Thousands of enslaved Hungarian Jews were forced to work on the project. In March 1945, Heinrich Himmler desired hostages for potential peace negotiations with the Western Allies. Himmler issued a directive that Jews were to be marched from the South-east wall to Mauthausen concentration camp. Thousands died on the marches.

The defensive line was only partly finished when the Red Army reached the line in March 1945, and merely slowed the speed of their offensive. The Red Army broke through the line at the beginning of the Vienna Offensive. Vienna is located only 35 kilometres (22 mi) west of the defensive line.
