= Carl Hollitzer =

Austrian caricaturist, singer and cabaret artist

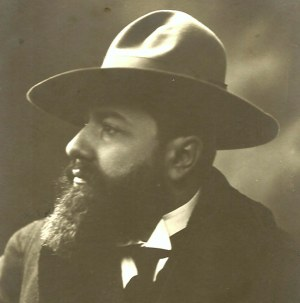
- Carl Hollitzer around 1908
- Born: 11 March 1874; Bad Deutsch-Altenburg, Lower Austria
- Died: 1 December 1942 (aged 68); Rekawinkel, Lower Austria, Austria
- Occupation(s): Caricaturist, singer, actor

Carl Leopold Hollitzer (born 11 March 1874 in Bad Deutsch-Altenburg, Lower Austria; died 1 December 1942 in Rekawinkel, Lower Austria, Austria) was an Austrian caricaturist, singer and cabaret artist.

== Biography ==
Hollitzer was born and raised in Deutsch-Altenburg. His family had a construction business. His father, Karl Hollitzer, was the local judge from 1876 until 1848 and from 1848 until 1884 he was elected mayor of Bad Deutsch-Altenburg. As owner of a stone pit he made a fortune with contracts from the time the Danube was regulated.

The young Carl Leopold studied at the Academy of Fine Arts Vienna. From 1906 on, he starred as a singer in the first Viennese cabaret stages, the cabaret Nachtlicht and the Cabaret Fledermaus. His second wife Gertrude Barrison was also a singer and they appeared many times together on the stage of the Cabaret Fledermaus.

He founded the artist association "Jungbund" and became its president. Later on he joined the Vienna Künstlerhaus. Hollitzer was also known for his fine caricatures. He caricatured some of the most famous people from his time like Gustav Klimt, Karl Kraus, Hermann Bahr, Egon Friedell and Peter Altenberg. Many originals of his caricatures are in the Albertina, Vienna. Many long forgotten and until this day unpublished scripts, notes and caricatures are in the hands of a collector from Vienna. The last exhibition took place in 2001 in the Österreichische Galerie Belvedere.

One of Hollitzer passions was military tradition. He managed to create one of the biggest collections of weapons and uniforms in Europe. This collection was put up for an auction in the year 1934. Most of the uniforms and weapons were bought by the Heeresgeschichtliches Museum in Vienna and are still exhibited until this day.

In 1956, an alley in the Viennese district Favoriten was named after Carl Hollitzer.
