= Idaho State Liquor Division =

Government agency controlling sale of alcohol in Idaho

Agency overview
- Type: Alcoholic beverage control
- Agency executive: Andrew Arulanandam, Director
- Website: liquor.idaho.gov

The Idaho State Liquor Division is an agency of the government of the state of Idaho (hence an alcoholic beverage control state) which maintains a monopoly on the sale of all alcoholic beverages which exceed 16% alcohol by volume.

Jeff Anderson was appointed to the office in 2010 by then-Governor Butch Otter. Anderson was also the director of the Idaho Lottery. He retired in July 2024.

After the announcement of his predecessor's retirement Andrew Arulanandam was appointed director by Governor Brad Little, effective September 2024. Like Anderson, Arulanandam was also appointed to direct the Idaho Lottery.
