= Louis Victor Eytinge =

American convicted murderer (1878–1938)

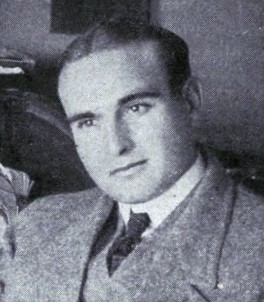
Eytinge c. 1910

Louis Victor Eytinge (1878–1938) was an American entrepreneur and career criminal who was convicted of murder and sentenced to life in prison in 1907. While incarcerated he developed groundbreaking communication and motivational skills that led to his fame and freedom.

== Family ==
His father was 56-year-old actor, Harry Eytinge, who moved to Dayton, Ohio, in about 1877 to manage a theater and run a drama school. In January 1878 he married one of his pupils, 22-year-old Ida Seebohm. (Note: Ida’s parents were Susan Grodhaus and Louis Seebohm from Germany. Seebohm was a photographer (using an early process called Daguerreotype) and artist located in Dayton. He died of fever in Brazil while traveling to Chatham Island on the Transit of Venus, 1874 expedition) Their son, Louis Victor Eytinge, was born in September of the same year. His parents divorced three years after his birth and he and his mother lived at the home of an aunt and uncle.

== Crime ==
His education at the Notre Dame College was cut short after he was accused of writing dud cheques. He next tried a career in the US Navy but was court-martialed for theft. Back in civilian life he continued his criminal ways and in 1903 was imprisoned for forgery, serving 3 years in the Ohio State Prison. In 1907 he met and befriended John Leicht, an asthmatic who was traveling to Arizona for health reasons. On March 17 the two hired a rig and took a trip to the desert outside of Phoenix. Later that day Eytinge returned alone and left town. Suspicion was aroused when Eytinge’s cheques bounced, plus the explanation he had given for his friend’s absence proved to be untrue. On 24 March, a week after his disappearance, Leicht’s body was found in the desert. Empty containers of chloroform and knock out drops found near the body led the authorities to conclude that Eytinge had drugged Leicht.

== Prison ==
Eytinge was arrested in San Francisco and stood trial in Arizona for murder; he was found guilty and given life imprisonment. He was ill with tuberculosis and to survive in prison he had to supplement his diet, but this required money that he did not have. Other prisoners made trinkets for sale to visitors, such as hatbands, belt buckles, and so on. Eytinge saw an opportunity to expand the market and started to write to prospective customers in areas such as Texas, California and New Mexico. His efforts were so successful, that he was able to purchase the essentials he needed to improve his health, plus provide a few comforts. He was moved from Yuma to a new prison in Florence where he continued his marketing activities, often writing advertising letters for companies, earning it was said up to $6600 USD a year. He also studied the penal system, corresponded with Arizona’s new governor, George W. P. Hunt - who sought his advice on reform - and became involved with the welfare of other prisoners.

Eytinge expanded his commercial enterprises into marketing via direct-mail. His success attracted the attention of the advertising industry; newspaper articles were written about him and trade publications sought his creative input. He edited a magazine, wrote stories and had a screen play accepted for a film (Man Under Cover). A campaign developed to have him paroled and in December 1922 he was released. Within days he married Pauline Lydia Diver, with whom he had corresponded when in jail.

== Freedom and return to prison ==
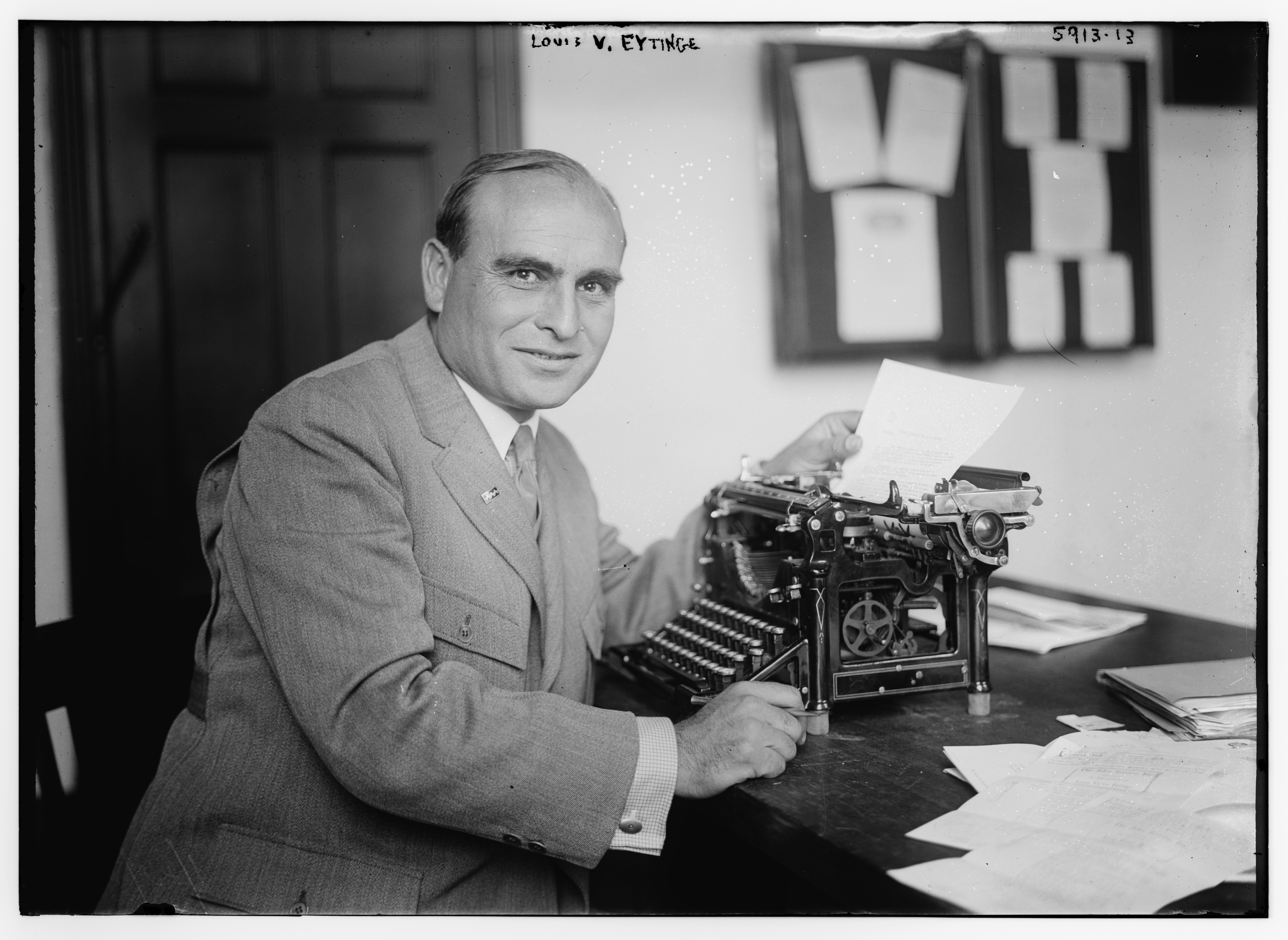
Eytinge c. 1923

For a period he had celebrity status, earning and spending big money. However, within a few years he returned to his old criminal ways to fund his lifestyle and parted from his wife. He was arrested in 1931 in California and charged with grand theft, serving his time in San Quentin and Folsom prison. The prison records indicate his left arm was amputated below the elbow at some time, and his death certificate shows that he also had a heart problem in 1936. He died in Kane Summit Hospital, Pennsylvania, on 17 December 1938.
