= Rose Eytinge =

American actress

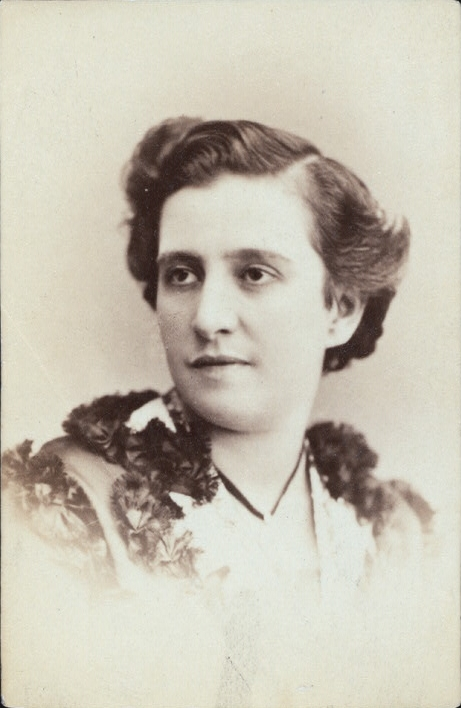
- Born: November 21, 1835; Philadelphia, Pennsylvania
- Died: December 20, 1911 (aged 76); Amityville, New York
- Occupation: Stage actress
- Spouse(s): David Barnes (1855-1862?) divorced George H. Butler (1869-1872) divorced Cyril Searle (1880-1884) separated

Rose Eytinge (November 21, 1835 – December 20, 1911) was a Jewish American actress and author. She is thought to be the first American actress to earn a three figure salary.

== Biography ==
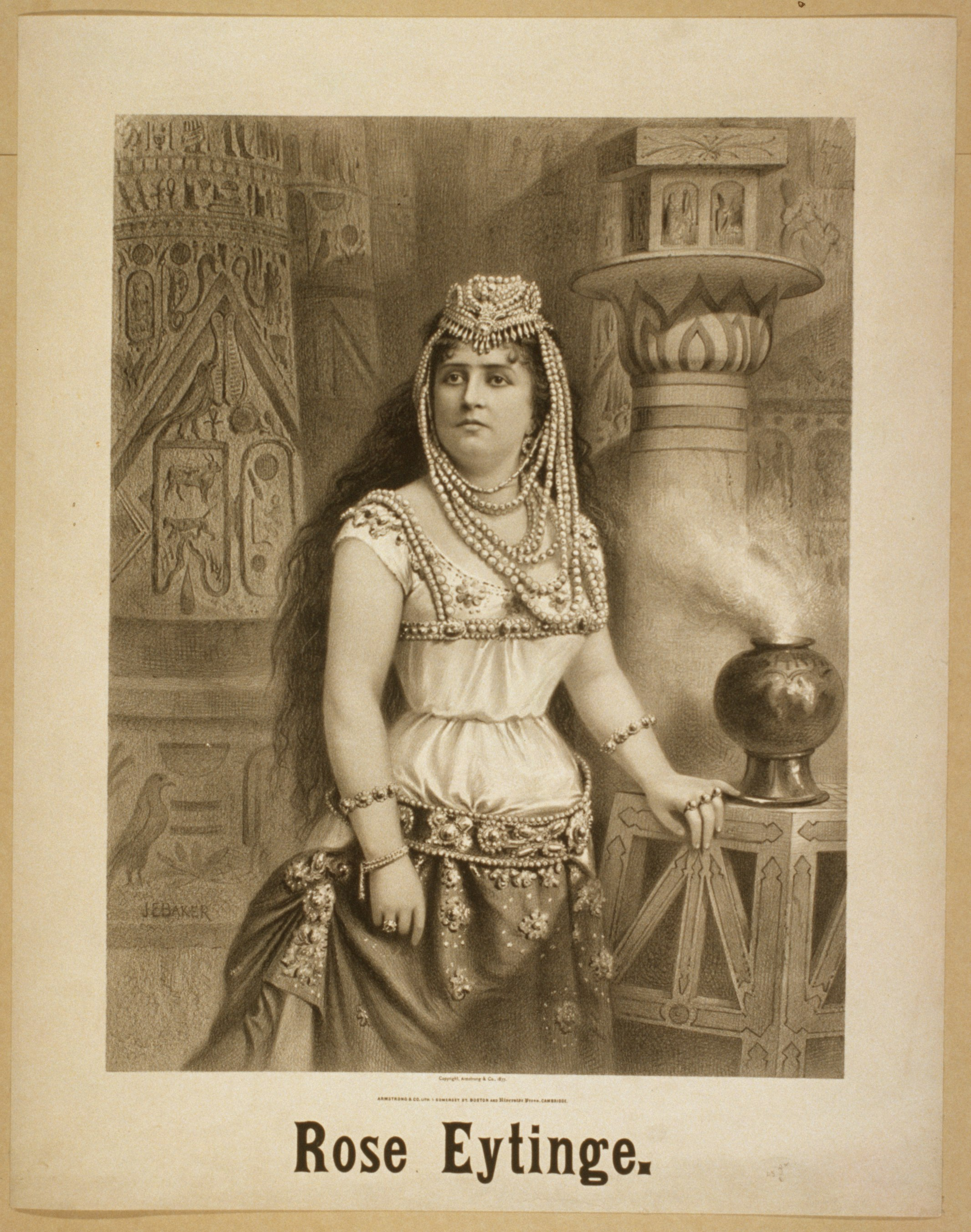
1877 theatre poster of Rose Eytinge

Eytinge was born November 21, 1835 in Philadelphia, Pennsylvania. She began on the amateur stage at 17 and soon was invited to join a professional touring company.

Her professional debut was on stage at the Olympic Theatre. She performed with Edwin Booth in "The Fool's Revenge". With Booth and others, she toured Boston, Philadelphia, Baltimore, and Washington, D.C.. President Abraham Lincoln attended her performances and she was invited to the White House.

In 1855, she married the newspaperman and author David M. Barnes (1820-1900), but was divorced in 1862. They had one daughter, Rose Courtney, an actress who married actor John T. Raymond. Her niece, Pearl Eytinge, was also an actress.

In 1869, she married Colonel George H. Butler, U. S. Consul General to Egypt. They lived abroad for two years and Eytinge took a break from performing. They had two children: a daughter, Florence (b. 1875) married Dr. Walsh, and a son, Benjamin Franklin Butler (1871-1904), a newspaper artist, who was the roommate of young John Barrymore and married to actress Alice Johnson. Due to Butler's abusive behavior and infidelities, Eytinge sued for divorce in 1882. (Note: The 1882 divorce from Butler was a "degree of absolute divorce" in the Supreme Court, Special Term. She and Butler must have divorced earlier because she remarried to Cyril Searle in 1880. Also Butler remarried secretly in 1880 to Josephine Chesney confirming the status of an earlier divorce date.)

Eytinge returned to New York to resume her career with the Union Square Theatre Company. It was at this time that she played one of her most famous roles, Shakespeare's "Cleopatra" for which she drew on her Egyptian experiences.

In 1880, she married the actor Cyril Searle, but they were separated four years later. She gave her last performance in 1907.

Among her principal later parts were Nancy Sykes in Oliver Twist, Gervaise in Drink, Ophelia to the Hamlet of E. L. Davenport, and Desdemona with James W. Wallack as Othello and Davenport as Iago.

Her literary works include the novel It Happened This Way (with S. Ada Fisher), the play Golden Chains, and adaptations of Charles Dickens' Oliver Twist, Dombey and Son, and Browning's Colombe's Birthday. Her personal memoirs were published in 1905.

Eytinge died of a stroke on December 20, 1911, at the Brunswick Home of Amityville, New York, where she was supported by the Actors Fund of America. Her body was sent to Washington for burial.

== Selected performances ==
- The Fool's Revenge as Fiordelisa (1864)
- Griffith Gaunt as Katherine Peyton (1866)
- Under the Gaslight as Laura Courtlandt (1867)
- Led Astray as Armande (1873)
- The Two Orphans as Marianne (1874)
- Rose Michel (in title role) (1875)

== Written works ==
- Eyting, Rose; Fisher, S. Ada (1890). It Happened This Way. United States Book Company.
- Eyting, Rose (1905). The Memories of Rose Eytinge. Frederick A. Stokes Company.
