= Top Ten Money Making Stars Poll =

Polls on determining the bankability of movie stars

The Top Ten Money Making Stars Poll were polls on determining the bankability of movie stars. They began quite early in movie history. At first, they were popular polls and contests conducted in film magazines, where the readers would vote for their favorite stars, like the poll published in New York Morning Telegraph on 17 December 1911. Magazines appeared and disappeared often and among the most consistent in those early days were the polls in the Motion Picture Magazine.

Though this and numerous other magazines, like Photoplay, continued with this type of poll, the standards for the polling were set by the Quigley Publishing Company. They published a poll, which became known as the "Top Ten Money Making Stars Poll", from a questionnaire sent to movie exhibitors every year between 1915 and 2013 by Quigley Publishing Company. The list was based on a poll of movie theater owners, who were asked to name who they felt were the previous year's top 10 money-making stars. The Top 10 Poll, which appeared annually in Quigley's Motion Picture Herald and The Motion Picture Almanac, was long regarded as one of the most reliable barometers of a movie star's box-office power, as film exhibitors base their decisions on one economic criterion: those stars who will bring patrons into their theaters.

For the 1915–1924 period, the list was compiled from 200,000 exhibitor reports, published in the "What the Picture Did for Me" department in 520 weekly editions of the Exhibitors Herald magazine. The first version of the questionnaire, specifically made for the exhibitors to vote for the money-makers, was used from 1925 to 1931. It included voting for both the box office films and the stars. A standardized questionnaire specifically for choosing the biggest box office stars was used after 1933.

== Records ==
Most years ranked top 10	Actor	Years
25	John Wayne	1949–1957, 1959–1974
21	Clint Eastwood	1968–1986, 1992–1993
20	Tom Cruise	1983, 1986–1990, 1992–1994, 1996–1997, 1999–2007
18	Gary Cooper	1936–1937, 1941–1949, 1951–1957
17	Tom Hanks	1988–1989, 1993–1995, 1998–2000, 2002–2007, 2009–2010, 2013
16	Clark Gable	1932–1943, 1947–1949, 1955
15	Bing Crosby	1934, 1937, 1940, 1943–1954
14	Paul Newman	1963–1964, 1966–1975, 1982, 1986
13	Mary Pickford	1914–1926
13	Bob Hope	1941–1953
13	Harrison Ford	1981–1985, 1990, 1993–1997, 2000, 2008
13	Mel Gibson	1987, 1989–1996, 1998–2000, 2002
12	Burt Reynolds	1973–1984
11	Douglas Fairbanks	1916–1926
11	Cary Grant	1944, 1948–1949, 1959–1966
10	Spencer Tracy	1938–1942, 1944–1945, 1948, 1950–1951
10	Betty Grable	1942–1951
10	James Stewart	1950, 1952–1959, 1965
10	Doris Day	1951–1952, 1959–1966
10	Barbra Streisand	1969–1970, 1972–1975, 1977–1980
10	Julia Roberts	1990–1991, 1993, 1997–2001, 2003–2004

Most years ranked #1	Actor	Years
7	Tom Cruise	1986, 1988, 1992, 1996, 2000–2001, 2005
5	Bing Crosby	1944–1948
5	Clint Eastwood	1972–1973, 1983–1984, 1993
5	Burt Reynolds	1978–1982
5	Tom Hanks	1994–1995, 1998, 2002, 2004
4	Shirley Temple	1935–1938
4	John Wayne	1950–1951, 1954, 1971
4	Doris Day	1960, 1962–1964
3	Mickey Rooney	1939–1941
3	Robert Redford	1974–1976
3	Johnny Depp	2006–2007, 2010
2	William S. Hart	1915–1916
2	Douglas Fairbanks	1917–1918
2	Wallace Reid	1919–1920
2	Mary Pickford	1921–1922
2	Clara Bow	1928–1929
2	Marie Dressler	1932–1933
2	Rock Hudson	1957, 1959
2	Julie Andrews	1966–1967
2	Paul Newman	1969–1970
2	Sylvester Stallone	1977, 1985

Most consecutive years ranked #1	Actor	Years
5	Bing Crosby	1944–1948
5	Burt Reynolds	1978–1982
4	Shirley Temple	1935–1938
3	Mickey Rooney	1939–1941
3	Doris Day	1962–1964
3	Robert Redford	1974–1976

== Poll results by year ==
Place	1912	1913	1914	1915
1	Maurice Costello	Romaine Fielding	Earle Williams	William S. Hart
2	Dolores Cassinelli	Earle Williams	Clara Kimball Young	Mary Pickford
3	Mae Hotely	J. Warren Kerrigan	Mary Pickford	Tom Mix
4	Francis X. Bushman	Alice Joyce	J. Warren Kerrigan	Blanche Sweet
5	Broncho Billy Anderson	Carlyle Blackwell	Mary Fuller	William Farnum
6	Alice Joyce	Francis X. Bushman	Marguerite Clayton	J. Warren Kerrigan
7	Octavia Handworth	Broncho Billy Anderson	Arthur Johnson	Dorothy Gish
8	Florence Lawrence	Muriel Ostriche	Alice Joyce	Anita Stewart
9	Arthur Johnson	Arthur Johnson	Carlyle Blackwell	Kathlyn Williams
10	May Buckley	Mary Fuller	Francis X. Bushman	Francis X. Bushman & Beverly Bayne

Place	1916	1917	1918	1919	1920
1	William S. Hart	Douglas Fairbanks	Douglas Fairbanks	Wallace Reid	Wallace Reid
2	Mary Pickford	William S. Hart	Mary Pickford	Douglas Fairbanks	Marguerite Clark
3	J. Warren Kerrigan	Anita Stewart	Wallace Reid	Mary Pickford	Charles Ray
4	Anita Stewart	Mary Pickford	William S. Hart	Charles Ray	Douglas Fairbanks
5	Tom Mix	Bessie Barriscale	Mary Miles Minter	William S. Hart	Mary Miles Minter
6	William Farnum	J. Warren Kerrigan	Clara Kimball Young	Marguerite Clark	Mary Pickford
7	Francis X. Bushman & Beverly Bayne	Wallace Reid	Dorothy Dalton	Jane & Katherine Lee ("Lee Kids")	Clara Kimball Young
8	Douglas Fairbanks	Charles Ray	Charles Ray	Mary Miles Minter	William S. Hart
9	Wallace Reid	Frank Keenan	Marguerite Clark	Clara Kimball Young	Norma Talmadge
10	Frank Keenan	Dorothy Dalton	Anita Stewart	Dorothy Dalton	Theda Bara

Place	1921	1922	1923	1924	1925
1	Mary Pickford	Mary Pickford	Thomas Meighan	Norma Talmadge	Rudolph Valentino
2	Douglas Fairbanks	Douglas Fairbanks	Norma Talmadge	Marion Davies	Norma Talmadge
3	Wallace Reid	Anita Stewart	Douglas Fairbanks	Rudolph Valentino	Marion Davies
4	Charles Ray	Thomas Meighan	Mary Pickford	Douglas Fairbanks	Mary Pickford
5	Gloria Swanson	Rudolph Valentino	Marion Davies	Thomas Meighan	Douglas Fairbanks
6	Mary Miles Minter	Pola Negri	Lon Chaney	Gloria Swanson	Fred Thomson
7	Marion Davies	Mae Murray	Rudolph Valentino	Mary Pickford	Harold Lloyd
8	Norma Talmadge	Harold Lloyd	Harold Lloyd	Lon Chaney	Colleen Moore
9	Clara Kimball Young	Lon Chaney	Gloria Swanson	Harold Lloyd	Gloria Swanson
10	William S. Hart	Douglas MacLean	Colleen Moore	Ramon Novarro	Thomas Meighan

Place	1926	1927 (Note: Top 10 lists for 1926–1929 were retroactively recalculated using new methodology, hence a discrepancies between the Top 10 and the Top 25 lists for 1927–1929)	1928	1929	1930
1	Colleen Moore	Tom Mix	Clara Bow	Clara Bow	Joan Crawford
2	Tom Mix	Colleen Moore	Lon Chaney	Lon Chaney	Clara Bow
3	Fred Thomson	Clara Bow	Colleen Moore	William Haines	William Haines
4	Harold Lloyd	Fred Thomson	Tom Mix	Hoot Gibson	Janet Gaynor
5	Hoot Gibson	Lon Chaney	John Gilbert	Colleen Moore	Colleen Moore
6	Norma Talmadge	Richard Dix	Harold Lloyd	Charles Buddy Rogers	Greta Garbo
7	Mary Pickford	Hoot Gibson	William Haines	Richard Barthelmess	Al Jolson
8	Douglas Fairbanks	Harold Lloyd	Richard Barthelmess	Ken Maynard	Richard Barthelmess
9	Thomas Meighan	John Gilbert	Billie Dove	Tom Mix	Rin Tin Tin
10	Reginald Denny	Bebe Daniels	Bebe Daniels	Nancy Carroll	Tom Mix

Place	1931	1932	1933	1934	1935
1	Janet Gaynor	Marie Dressler	Marie Dressler	Will Rogers	Shirley Temple
2	Charles Farrell	Janet Gaynor	Will Rogers	Clark Gable	Will Rogers
3	Joan Crawford	Joan Crawford	Janet Gaynor	Janet Gaynor	Clark Gable
4	Norma Shearer	Charles Farrell	Eddie Cantor	Wallace Beery	Fred Astaire and Ginger Rogers
5	Marie Dressler	Greta Garbo	Wallace Beery	Mae West	Joan Crawford
6	Wallace Beery	Norma Shearer	Jean Harlow	Joan Crawford	Claudette Colbert
7	Clara Bow	Wallace Beery	Clark Gable	Bing Crosby	Dick Powell
8	Al Jolson	Clark Gable	Mae West	Shirley Temple	Wallace Beery
9	Colleen Moore	Will Rogers	Norma Shearer	Marie Dressler	Joe E. Brown
10	Greta Garbo	Joe E. Brown	Joan Crawford	Norma Shearer	James Cagney

Place	1936	1937	1938	1939	1940
1	Shirley Temple	Shirley Temple	Shirley Temple	Mickey Rooney	Mickey Rooney
2	Clark Gable	Clark Gable	Clark Gable	Tyrone Power	Spencer Tracy
3	Fred Astaire and Ginger Rogers	Robert Taylor	Sonja Henie	Spencer Tracy	Clark Gable
4	Robert Taylor	Bing Crosby	Mickey Rooney	Clark Gable	Gene Autry
5	Joe E. Brown	William Powell	Spencer Tracy	Shirley Temple	Tyrone Power
6	Dick Powell	Jane Withers	Robert Taylor	Bette Davis	James Cagney
7	Joan Crawford	Fred Astaire and Ginger Rogers	Myrna Loy	Alice Faye	Bing Crosby
8	Claudette Colbert	Sonja Henie	Jane Withers	Errol Flynn	Wallace Beery
9	Jeanette MacDonald	Gary Cooper	Alice Faye	James Cagney	Bette Davis
10	Gary Cooper	Myrna Loy	Tyrone Power	Sonja Henie	Judy Garland

Place	1941	1942	1943	1944	1945
1	Mickey Rooney	Abbott and Costello	Betty Grable	Bing Crosby	Bing Crosby
2	Clark Gable	Clark Gable	Bob Hope	Gary Cooper	Van Johnson
3	Abbott and Costello	Gary Cooper	Abbott and Costello	Bob Hope	Greer Garson
4	Bob Hope	Mickey Rooney	Bing Crosby	Betty Grable	Betty Grable
5	Spencer Tracy	Bob Hope	Gary Cooper	Spencer Tracy	Spencer Tracy
6	Gene Autry	James Cagney	Greer Garson	Greer Garson	Humphrey Bogart
7	Gary Cooper	Gene Autry	Humphrey Bogart	Humphrey Bogart	Gary Cooper
8	Bette Davis	Betty Grable	James Cagney	Abbott and Costello	Bob Hope
9	James Cagney	Greer Garson	Mickey Rooney	Cary Grant	Judy Garland
10	Judy Garland	Spencer Tracy	Clark Gable	Bette Davis	Margaret O'Brien

Place	1946	1947	1948	1949	1950
1	Bing Crosby	Bing Crosby	Bing Crosby	Bob Hope	John Wayne
2	Ingrid Bergman	Betty Grable	Betty Grable	Bing Crosby	Bob Hope
3	Van Johnson	Ingrid Bergman	Abbott and Costello	Abbott and Costello	Bing Crosby
4	Gary Cooper	Gary Cooper	Gary Cooper	John Wayne	Betty Grable
5	Bob Hope	Humphrey Bogart	Bob Hope	Gary Cooper	James Stewart
6	Humphrey Bogart	Bob Hope	Humphrey Bogart	Cary Grant	Abbott and Costello
7	Greer Garson	Clark Gable	Clark Gable	Betty Grable	Clifton Webb
8	Margaret O'Brien	Gregory Peck	Cary Grant	Esther Williams	Esther Williams
9	Betty Grable	Claudette Colbert	Spencer Tracy	Humphrey Bogart	Spencer Tracy
10	Roy Rogers	Alan Ladd	Ingrid Bergman	Clark Gable	Randolph Scott

Place	1951	1952	1953	1954	1955
1	John Wayne	Martin and Lewis	Gary Cooper	John Wayne	James Stewart
2	Martin and Lewis	Gary Cooper	Martin and Lewis	Martin and Lewis	Grace Kelly
3	Betty Grable	John Wayne	John Wayne	Gary Cooper	John Wayne
4	Abbott and Costello	Bing Crosby	Alan Ladd	James Stewart	William Holden
5	Bing Crosby	Bob Hope	Bing Crosby	Marilyn Monroe	Gary Cooper
6	Bob Hope	James Stewart	Marilyn Monroe	Alan Ladd	Marlon Brando
7	Randolph Scott	Doris Day	James Stewart	William Holden	Martin and Lewis
8	Gary Cooper	Gregory Peck	Bob Hope	Bing Crosby	Humphrey Bogart
9	Doris Day	Susan Hayward	Susan Hayward	Jane Wyman	June Allyson
10	Spencer Tracy	Randolph Scott	Randolph Scott	Marlon Brando	Clark Gable

Place	1956	1957	1958	1959	1960
1	William Holden	Rock Hudson	Glenn Ford	Rock Hudson	Doris Day
2	John Wayne	John Wayne	Elizabeth Taylor	Cary Grant	Rock Hudson
3	James Stewart	Pat Boone	Jerry Lewis	James Stewart	Cary Grant
4	Burt Lancaster	Elvis Presley	Marlon Brando	Doris Day	Elizabeth Taylor
5	Glenn Ford	Frank Sinatra	Rock Hudson	Debbie Reynolds	Debbie Reynolds
6	Martin and Lewis	Gary Cooper	William Holden	Glenn Ford	Tony Curtis
7	Gary Cooper	William Holden	Brigitte Bardot	Frank Sinatra	Sandra Dee
8	Marilyn Monroe	James Stewart	Yul Brynner	John Wayne	Frank Sinatra
9	Kim Novak	Jerry Lewis	James Stewart	Jerry Lewis	Jack Lemmon
10	Frank Sinatra	Yul Brynner	Frank Sinatra	Susan Hayward	John Wayne

Place	1961	1962	1963	1964	1965
1	Elizabeth Taylor	Doris Day	Doris Day	Doris Day	Sean Connery
2	Rock Hudson	Rock Hudson	John Wayne	Jack Lemmon	John Wayne
3	Doris Day	Cary Grant	Rock Hudson	Rock Hudson	Doris Day
4	John Wayne	John Wayne	Jack Lemmon	John Wayne	Julie Andrews
5	Cary Grant	Elvis Presley	Cary Grant	Cary Grant	Jack Lemmon
6	Sandra Dee	Elizabeth Taylor	Elizabeth Taylor	Elvis Presley	Elvis Presley
7	Jerry Lewis	Jerry Lewis	Elvis Presley	Shirley MacLaine	Cary Grant
8	William Holden	Frank Sinatra	Sandra Dee	Ann-Margret	James Stewart
9	Tony Curtis	Sandra Dee	Paul Newman	Paul Newman	Elizabeth Taylor
10	Elvis Presley	Burt Lancaster	Jerry Lewis	Richard Burton	Richard Burton

Place	1966	1967	1968	1969	1970
1	Julie Andrews	Julie Andrews	Sidney Poitier	Paul Newman	Paul Newman
2	Sean Connery	Lee Marvin	Paul Newman	John Wayne	Clint Eastwood
3	Elizabeth Taylor	Paul Newman	Julie Andrews	Steve McQueen	Steve McQueen
4	Jack Lemmon	Dean Martin	John Wayne	Dustin Hoffman	John Wayne
5	Richard Burton	Sean Connery	Clint Eastwood	Clint Eastwood	Elliott Gould
6	Cary Grant	Elizabeth Taylor	Dean Martin	Sidney Poitier	Dustin Hoffman
7	John Wayne	Sidney Poitier	Steve McQueen	Lee Marvin	Lee Marvin
8	Doris Day	John Wayne	Jack Lemmon	Jack Lemmon	Jack Lemmon
9	Paul Newman	Richard Burton	Lee Marvin	Katharine Hepburn	Barbra Streisand
10	Elvis Presley	Steve McQueen	Elizabeth Taylor	Barbra Streisand	Walter Matthau

Place	1971	1972	1973	1974	1975
1	John Wayne	Clint Eastwood	Clint Eastwood	Robert Redford	Robert Redford
2	Clint Eastwood	George C. Scott	Ryan O'Neal	Clint Eastwood	Barbra Streisand
3	Paul Newman	Gene Hackman	Steve McQueen	Paul Newman	Al Pacino
4	Steve McQueen	John Wayne	Burt Reynolds	Barbra Streisand	Charles Bronson
5	George C. Scott	Barbra Streisand	Robert Redford	Steve McQueen	Paul Newman
6	Dustin Hoffman	Marlon Brando	Barbra Streisand	Burt Reynolds	Clint Eastwood
7	Walter Matthau	Paul Newman	Paul Newman	Charles Bronson	Burt Reynolds
8	Ali MacGraw	Steve McQueen	Charles Bronson	Jack Nicholson	Woody Allen
9	Sean Connery	Dustin Hoffman	John Wayne	Al Pacino	Steve McQueen
10	Lee Marvin	Goldie Hawn	Marlon Brando	John Wayne	Gene Hackman

Place	1976	1977	1978	1979	1980
1	Robert Redford	Sylvester Stallone	Burt Reynolds	Burt Reynolds	Burt Reynolds
2	Jack Nicholson	Barbra Streisand	John Travolta	Clint Eastwood	Robert Redford
3	Dustin Hoffman	Clint Eastwood	Richard Dreyfuss	Jane Fonda	Clint Eastwood
4	Clint Eastwood	Burt Reynolds	Warren Beatty	Woody Allen	Jane Fonda
5	Mel Brooks	Robert Redford	Clint Eastwood	Barbra Streisand	Dustin Hoffman
6	Burt Reynolds	Woody Allen	Woody Allen	Sylvester Stallone	John Travolta
7	Al Pacino	Mel Brooks	Diane Keaton	John Travolta	Sally Field
8	Tatum O'Neal	Al Pacino	Jane Fonda	Jill Clayburgh	Sissy Spacek
9	Woody Allen	Diane Keaton	Peter Sellers	Roger Moore	Barbra Streisand
10	Charles Bronson	Robert De Niro	Barbra Streisand	Mel Brooks	Steve Martin

Place	1981	1982	1983	1984	1985
1	Burt Reynolds	Burt Reynolds	Clint Eastwood	Clint Eastwood	Sylvester Stallone
2	Clint Eastwood	Clint Eastwood	Eddie Murphy	Bill Murray	Eddie Murphy
3	Dudley Moore	Sylvester Stallone	Sylvester Stallone	Harrison Ford	Clint Eastwood
4	Dolly Parton	Dudley Moore	Burt Reynolds	Eddie Murphy	Michael J. Fox
5	Jane Fonda	Richard Pryor	John Travolta	Sally Field	Chevy Chase
6	Harrison Ford	Dolly Parton	Dustin Hoffman	Burt Reynolds	Arnold Schwarzenegger
7	Alan Alda	Jane Fonda	Harrison Ford	Robert Redford	Chuck Norris
8	Bo Derek	Richard Gere	Richard Gere	Prince	Harrison Ford
9	Goldie Hawn	Paul Newman	Chevy Chase	Dan Aykroyd	Michael Douglas
10	Bill Murray	Harrison Ford	Tom Cruise	Meryl Streep	Meryl Streep

Place	1986	1987	1988	1989	1990
1	Tom Cruise	Eddie Murphy	Tom Cruise	Jack Nicholson	Arnold Schwarzenegger
2	Eddie Murphy	Michael Douglas	Eddie Murphy	Tom Cruise	Julia Roberts
3	Paul Hogan	Michael J. Fox	Tom Hanks	Robin Williams	Bruce Willis
4	Rodney Dangerfield	Arnold Schwarzenegger	Arnold Schwarzenegger	Michael Douglas	Tom Cruise
5	Bette Midler	Paul Hogan	Paul Hogan	Tom Hanks	Mel Gibson
6	Sylvester Stallone	Tom Cruise	Danny DeVito	Michael J. Fox	Kevin Costner
7	Clint Eastwood	Glenn Close	Bette Midler	Eddie Murphy	Patrick Swayze
8	Whoopi Goldberg	Sylvester Stallone	Robin Williams	Mel Gibson	Sean Connery
9	Kathleen Turner	Cher	Tom Selleck	Sean Connery	Harrison Ford
10	Paul Newman	Mel Gibson	Dustin Hoffman	Kathleen Turner	Richard Gere

Place	1991	1992	1993	1994	1995
1	Kevin Costner	Tom Cruise	Clint Eastwood	Tom Hanks	Tom Hanks
2	Arnold Schwarzenegger	Mel Gibson	Tom Cruise	Jim Carrey	Jim Carrey
3	Robin Williams	Kevin Costner	Robin Williams	Arnold Schwarzenegger	Brad Pitt
4	Julia Roberts	Jack Nicholson	Kevin Costner	Tom Cruise	Harrison Ford
5	Macaulay Culkin	Macaulay Culkin	Harrison Ford	Harrison Ford	Robin Williams
6	Jodie Foster	Whoopi Goldberg	Julia Roberts	Tim Allen	Sandra Bullock
7	Billy Crystal	Michael Douglas	Tom Hanks	Mel Gibson	Mel Gibson
8	Dustin Hoffman	Clint Eastwood	Mel Gibson	Jodie Foster	Demi Moore
9	Robert De Niro	Steven Seagal	Whoopi Goldberg	Michael Douglas	John Travolta
10	Mel Gibson	Robin Williams	Sylvester Stallone	Tommy Lee Jones	Kevin Costner; Michael Douglas (tie)

Place	1996	1997	1998	1999	2000
1	Tom Cruise	Harrison Ford	Tom Hanks	Julia Roberts	Tom Cruise
1	Mel Gibson	Julia Roberts	Jim Carrey	Tom Hanks	Julia Roberts
3	John Travolta	Leonardo DiCaprio	Leonardo DiCaprio	Adam Sandler	George Clooney
4	Arnold Schwarzenegger	Will Smith	Robin Williams	Bruce Willis	Eddie Murphy
5	Sandra Bullock	Tom Cruise	Meg Ryan	Mike Myers	Russell Crowe
6	Robin Williams	Jack Nicholson	Mel Gibson	Tom Cruise	Mel Gibson
7	Sean Connery	Jim Carrey	Adam Sandler	Will Smith	Martin Lawrence
8	Harrison Ford	John Travolta	Eddie Murphy	Mel Gibson	Tom Hanks
9	Kevin Costner	Robin Williams	Cameron Diaz	Meg Ryan	Jim Carrey
10	Michelle Pfeiffer	Tommy Lee Jones	Julia Roberts	Sandra Bullock	Harrison Ford

Place	2001	2002	2003	2004	2005
1	Tom Cruise	Tom Hanks	Jim Carrey	Tom Hanks	Tom Cruise
2	George Clooney	Tom Cruise	Nicole Kidman	Tom Cruise	Johnny Depp
3	Julia Roberts	Mike Myers	Jack Nicholson	Leonardo DiCaprio	Angelina Jolie
4	Russell Crowe	Reese Witherspoon	Tom Cruise	Nicolas Cage	Brad Pitt
5	Nicole Kidman	Leonardo DiCaprio	Julia Roberts	Jim Carrey	Vince Vaughn
6	Denzel Washington	Nicole Kidman	Johnny Depp	Denzel Washington	George Clooney
7	Will Smith	Catherine Zeta-Jones	Russell Crowe	Julia Roberts	Will Smith
8	Brad Pitt	Denzel Washington	Tom Hanks	Will Smith	Reese Witherspoon
9	Ben Affleck	Mel Gibson	Will Ferrell	Brad Pitt	Adam Sandler
10	Jackie Chan	Vin Diesel	Renée Zellweger	Adam Sandler	Tom Hanks

Place	2006	2007	2008	2009	2010
1	Johnny Depp	Johnny Depp	Will Smith	Sandra Bullock	Johnny Depp
2	Leonardo DiCaprio	Will Smith	Robert Downey Jr.	Johnny Depp	Angelina Jolie
3	Will Smith	George Clooney	Christian Bale	Matt Damon	Robert Downey Jr.
4	Denzel Washington	Matt Damon	Shia LaBeouf	George Clooney	Matt Damon
5	Tom Hanks	Denzel Washington	Harrison Ford	Robert Downey Jr.	Steve Carell
6	George Clooney	Russell Crowe	Adam Sandler	Tom Hanks	Tom Hanks
7	Will Ferrell	Tom Cruise	Reese Witherspoon	Meryl Streep	Denzel Washington
8	Tom Cruise	Nicolas Cage	George Clooney	Brad Pitt	Leonardo DiCaprio
9	Dakota Fanning	Will Ferrell	Angelina Jolie	Shia LaBeouf	George Clooney
10	Sacha Baron Cohen	Tom Hanks	Daniel Craig	Denzel Washington	Anne Hathaway

Place	2011	2012	2013
1	Brad Pitt	Denzel Washington	Jennifer Lawrence
2	George Clooney	Anne Hathaway	Sandra Bullock
3	Johnny Depp	Hugh Jackman	Bradley Cooper
4	Leonardo DiCaprio	Mark Wahlberg	Tom Hanks
5	Matt Damon	Johnny Depp	Denzel Washington
6	Sandra Bullock	Daniel Craig	Leonardo DiCaprio
7	Bradley Cooper	Daniel Day-Lewis	Robert Downey Jr.
8	Robert Downey Jr.	Brad Pitt	Hugh Jackman
9	Meryl Streep	Leonardo DiCaprio	Brad Pitt
10	Ben Stiller	Robert Downey Jr.	Melissa McCarthy

== Select top 25 lists ==
In addition to the top ten stars for that year, the Quigley Poll would commonly list the next 15 stars as well. A sample of these, including some of the predecessors' lists, are below:

Place	1912	1913	1914	1926	1927
1	Maurice Costello	Romaine Fielding	Earle Williams	Colleen Moore	Tom Mix
2	Dolores Cassinelli	Earle Williams	Clara Kimball Young	Tom Mix	Colleen Moore
3	Mae Hotely	J. Warren Kerrigan	Mary Pickford	Fred Thomson	Clara Bow
4	Francis X. Bushman	Alice Joyce	J. Warren Kerrigan	Harold Lloyd	Fred Thomson
5	Broncho Billy Anderson	Carlyle Blackwell	Mary Fuller	Hoot Gibson	Lon Chaney
6	Alice Joyce	Francis X. Bushman	Marguerite Clayton	Norma Talmadge	Richard Dix
7	Octavia Handworth	Broncho Billy Anderson	Arthur Johnson	Mary Pickford	Hoot Gibson
8	Florence Lawrence	Muriel Ostriche	Alice Joyce	Douglas Fairbanks	Harold Lloyd
9	Arthur Johnson	Arthur Johnson	Carlyle Blackwell	Thomas Meighan	Ken Maynard
10	May Buckley	Mary Fuller	Francis X. Bushman	Reginald Denny	John Gilbert
11	Florence Turner	Edith Storey	Crane Wilbur	Milton Sills	Bebe Daniels
12	Mary Pickford	Crane Wilbur	Edith Storey	Richard Dix	Wallace Beery
13	Mary Fuller	Maurice Costello	Florence Lawrence	Lon Chaney	Douglas Fairbanks
14	Gladys Field	Ormi Hawley	King Baggot	Buck Jones	Laura La Plante
15	Robert Gaillard	Mary Pickford	Anita Stewart	Norma Shearer	Norma Shearer
16	Carlyle Blackwell	Florence La Badie	Romaine Fielding	Gloria Swanson	Rin Tin Tin
17	Gene Gauntier	Clara Kimball Young	Maurice Costello	Wallace Beery	Charles Murray
18	Sadie Osmon	Marguerite Snow	Lottie Briscoe	Bebe Daniels	Marion Davies
19	J. Warren Kerrigan	Dolores Cassinelli	Broncho Billy Anderson	Corinne Griffith	Norma Talmadge
20	Helen Gardner	Lillian Walker	Florence Turner	Jack Holt	Buck Jones
21	Marin Sais	Blanche Sweet	Blanche Sweet	Constance Talmadge	Milton Sills
22	Gwendolyn Pates	E.K. Lincoln	Vivian Rich	Rin Tin Tin	Jack Holt
23	Eleanor Blanchard	Florence Turner	Lillian Walker	Jackie Coogan	Mary Pickford
24	Crane Wilbur	Pearl White	True Boardman	Marion Davies	Raymond Hatton
25	Lillian Walker	Edwin August	Norma Talmadge	Charlie Chaplin	Thomas Meighan

Place	1928	1929	1932	1933	1934
1	Clara Bow	Clara Bow	Marie Dressler	Marie Dressler	Will Rogers
2	Lon Chaney	Lon Chaney	Janet Gaynor	Will Rogers	Clark Gable
3	Colleen Moore	William Haines	Joan Crawford	Janet Gaynor	Janet Gaynor
4	Tom Mix	Hoot Gibson	Charles Farrell	Eddie Cantor	Wallace Beery
5	John Gilbert	Charles Buddy Rogers	Greta Garbo	Wallace Beery	Mae West
6	Harold Lloyd	Richard Barthelmess	Norma Shearer	Jean Harlow	Joan Crawford
7	Richard Dix	Ken Maynard	Wallace Beery	Clark Gable	Bing Crosby
8	William Haines	Tom Mix	Clark Gable	Mae West	Shirley Temple
9	Richard Barthelmess	Colleen Moore	Will Rogers	Norma Shearer	Marie Dressler
10	Billie Dove	Richard Dix	Joe E. Brown	Joan Crawford	Norma Shearer
11	Bebe Daniels	Nancy Carroll	Marx Brothers & Wheeler & Woolsey (tied)	Joe E. Brown	Katharine Hepburn
12	Hoot Gibson	Ramon Novarro	Eddie Cantor	Lionel Barrymore	Joe E. Brown
13	Fred Thomson	Al Jolson	Maurice Chevalier	Marx Brothers	Claudette Colbert
14	Ken Maynard	George Bancroft	Constance Bennett	Bing Crosby	Jean Harlow
15	Dolores del Río	Joan Crawford	George Arliss	Wheeler & Woolsey	Eddie Cantor
16	Milton Sills	Jack Holt	James Dunn	Edward G. Robinson	Dick Powell
17	Douglas Fairbanks	Greta Garbo	Sally Eilers	Slim Summerville	George Arliss
18	Mary Pickford	Gary Cooper	Marlene Dietrich	ZaSu Pitts	Warner Baxter
19	Jack Holt	Milton Sills	Lionel Barrymore	Maurice Chevalier	Wheeler & Woolsey
20	Ramon Novarro	Bebe Daniels	Jackie Cooper	Fredric March & Robert Montgomery (tied)	James Cagney
21	Marion Davies	Alice White	Barbara Stanwyck	Helen Hayes	Lionel Barrymore
22	Emil Jannings	John Gilbert	Edward G. Robinson	Warner Baxter	Marion Davies
23	Laura La Plante	Laura La Plante	George O'Brien	George Arliss	Buck Jones
24	Norma Shearer	Norma Shearer	Warner Baxter	James Cagney	Fredric March
25	Charlie Chaplin	William Boyd	Richard Dix	Lee Tracy	Kay Francis

Additional listings for 1928: 26) Joan Crawford, 27) Buck Jones, 28) Gary Cooper, 29) Janet Gaynor and George Bancroft (tied), 31) John Barrymore and Thomas Meighan (tied), 33) Reginald Denny, 34) Greta Garbo and William Boyd (tied), 36) Norma Talmadge

Additional Listings for 1929: 26) Billie Dove, 27) Delores Del Rio and Douglas Fairbanks (tied), 29) Harold Lloyd, 30) Mary Pickford and John Boles (tied)

Additional Listings for 1932: 26) Robert Montgomery, 27) James Cagney, 28) Fredric March, 29) Jack Holt, 30) Ruth Chatterton, 31) Buck Jones and Buster Keaton (tied), 33) Johnny Weissmuller, 34) Lew Ayres, 35) Sylvia Sidney, 36) John Barrymore and Polly Moran (tied), 38) Winnie Lightner and Tom Mix (tied), 40) Ralph Graves, Boris Karloff and Ramon Novarro (tied), 43) Joan Blondell, Douglas Fairbanks Jr. and Ann Harding (tied)

Additional listings for 1933: 26) Sally Eilers, 27) George O’Brien, 28) Ann Harding, 29) Marlene Dietrich, 30) Greta Garbo, 31) Richard Barthelmess, 32) John Barrymore, 33) Buck Jones and Paul Muni (tied), 35) James Dunn, 36) Marion Davies, 37) Ruby Keeler, 38) Spencer Tracy, 39) Tom Mix, 40) Clara Bow and Kay Francis (tied), 42) Claudette Colbert, 43) Joan Blondell, 44) Laurel and Hardy, 45) Barbara Stanwyck, 46) Walter Huston, 47) Constance Bennett and Gary Cooper (tied), 49) Irene Dunne, 50) Richard Dix, Jack Holt and George Raft (tied), 53) Charles Farrell, 54) Charles Ruggles and Ruth Chatterton (tied), 55) Ronald Coleman, 56) Sylvia Sidney, 57) Katharine Hepburn, Ken Maynard and Randolph Scott (tied), 60) Jack Oakie, 61) Loretta Young, 62) Ramon Novarro and Dick Powell (tied), 64) Harold Lloyd, 65) Marion Nixon, 66) Leslie Howard and Tom Keene (tied), 86) Kate Smith

Additional Listings for 1934: 26) Robert Montgomery and William Powell (tied), 28) Lee Tracy, 29) Greta Garbo and Ann Harding (tied), 31) George O’Brien, 32) W.C. Fields, 33) Joan Blondell, 34) Ginger Rogers, 35) Ken Maynard, 36) Edward G. Robinson and Myrna Loy (tied), 38) Spencer Tracy, 39) Ruby Keeler, 40) The Marx Brothers, James Dunn and Laurel & Hardy, 43) Al Jolson, 44) Richard Dix, 45) Dick Powell & Ruby Keeler (team) and George Raft (tied), 47) Irene Dunne, 48) Zasu Pitts and Gary Cooper (tied), 50) Randolph Scott, 51) Johnny Weissmuller and John Boles (tied), 53) Jackie Cooper and Sylvia Sidney (tied), 55) Jack Holt, 56) Delores Del Rio, Marlene Dietrich, Charles Ruggles and John Barrymore (tied), 60) Charles Farrell, 61) John Wayne and Jack Oakie (tied), 63) Claudette Colbert & Clark Gable (team), 64) Constance Bennett, 65) Slim Summerville, Clara Bow and Richard Barthelmess (tied), 66) Paul Muni, Lilian Harvey and Barbara Stanwyck (tied), 69) Leslie Howard and Tim McCoy (tied) 96) Maurice Chevalier

Place	1935	1936	1937	1938	1939
1	Shirley Temple	Shirley Temple	Shirley Temple	Shirley Temple	Mickey Rooney
2	Will Rogers	Clark Gable	Clark Gable	Clark Gable	Tyrone Power
3	Clark Gable	Fred Astaire and Ginger Rogers (as a team)	Robert Taylor	Sonja Henie	Spencer Tracy
4	Fred Astaire and Ginger Rogers (as a team)	Robert Taylor	Bing Crosby	Mickey Rooney	Clark Gable
5	Joan Crawford	Joe E. Brown	William Powell	Spencer Tracy	Shirley Temple
6	Claudette Colbert	Dick Powell	Jane Withers	Robert Taylor	Bette Davis
7	Dick Powell	Joan Crawford	Fred Astaire and Ginger Rogers (as a team)	Myrna Loy	Alice Faye
8	Wallace Beery	Claudette Colbert	Sonja Henie	Jane Withers	Errol Flynn
9	Joe E. Brown	Jeanette MacDonald	Gary Cooper	Alice Faye	James Cagney
10	James Cagney	Gary Cooper	Myrna Loy	Tyrone Power	Sonja Henie
11	Mae West	Jane Withers	Bob Burns	Gary Cooper	Bing Crosby
12	Bing Crosby	James Cagney	Martha Raye	Wallace Beery	Deanna Durbin
13	Fred Astaire	William Powell	Jeanette MacDonald	Bing Crosby	Jane Withers
14	Ginger Rogers	Jean Harlow	Dick Powell	Jeanette MacDonald	Robert Taylor
15	William Powell	Wallace Beery	Wallace Beery	Deanna Durbin	Wallace Beery
16	Janet Gaynor	Fred MacMurray	Joan Crawford	Don Ameche	Myrna Loy
17	Jean Harlow	Irene Dunne	Joe E. Brown	Dorothy Lamour	Bob Burns
18	Norma Shearer	Myrna Loy	Spencer Tracy	Ginger Rogers	Gary Cooper
19	W. C. Fields	Ginger Rogers	Claudette Colbert	Nelson Eddy	Jeanette MacDonald
20	Ruby Keeler	Fred Astaire	Eleanor Powell	Bob Burns	Don Ameche
21	Warner Baxter	Warner Baxter	Jeanette MacDonald and Nelson Eddy (as a team)	Errol Flynn	Ginger Rogers
22	Grace Moore	Bing Crosby	Jack Benny	Jeanette MacDonald and Nelson Eddy (as a team)	Henry Fonda
23	Katharine Hepburn	Dionne Quintuplets	Nelson Eddy	Irene Dunne	Paul Muni
24	Buck Jones	Janet Gaynor	William Powell and Myrna Loy (as a team)	Paul Muni	Irene Dunne
25	Fredric March	Nelson Eddy	Bob Burns and Martha Raye (as a team)	William Powell	Cary Grant

Additional listings for 1935: 26) Pat O’Brien, 27) George O’Brien, 28) Eddie Cantor, 29) Robert Montgomery, 30) Wheeler and Woolsey, 31) Gary Cooper, 32) George Raft, 33) Myrna Loy, 34) Jane Withers, 35) Jeanette MacDonald, 36) George Arliss, 37) Kay Francis, 38) Richard Dix and Hoot Gibson (tied), 40) Joan Blondell, 41) Charles Laughton, 42) Joe Penner, 43) Greta Garbo and Paul Muni (tied), 45) Randolph Scott, Al Jolson, and James Cagney & Pat O’Brien (tied), 48) Lionel Barrymore, 49) Boris Karloff and Loretta Young (tied), 51) John Boles, 52) Tim McCoy and Jackie Cooper (tied), 54) Ken Maynard, 55) John Wayne, 56) Marion Davies, 57) Laurel & Hardy (team) and James Dunn (tied), 59) Warner Oland, 60) Charles Ruggles, 61) Edward G. Robinson, 62) Irene Dunne and Jack Oakie, 64) Jeanette MadDonald & Nelson Eddy (team), 65) Robert Donat, 66) Jean Parker and Guy Kibbee (tied), 68) Margaret Sullavan, Zasu Pitts, and Ronald Colman (tied), 71) Jack Holt, May Robson and Warren William (tied), 74) Sylvia Sidney, 75) Edmund Lowe and Spencer Tracy (tied), 77) Anne Shirley and Bette Davis (tied), 79) Edward Arnold, 80) Nelson Eddy, Miriam Hopkins, Robert Taylor, Freddie Bartholomew and Alice Faye (tied)

Place	1940	1941	1942	1943	1944
1	Mickey Rooney	Mickey Rooney	Abbott and Costello	Betty Grable	Bing Crosby
2	Spencer Tracy	Clark Gable	Clark Gable	Bob Hope	Gary Cooper
3	Clark Gable	Abbott and Costello	Gary Cooper	Abbott and Costello	Bob Hope
4	Gene Autry	Bob Hope	Mickey Rooney	Bing Crosby	Betty Grable
5	Tyrone Power	Spencer Tracy	Bob Hope	Gary Cooper	Spencer Tracy
6	James Cagney	Gene Autry	James Cagney	Greer Garson	Greer Garson
7	Bing Crosby	Gary Cooper	Gene Autry	Humphrey Bogart	Humphrey Bogart
8	Wallace Beery	Bette Davis	Betty Grable	James Cagney	Abbott and Costello
9	Bette Davis	James Cagney	Greer Garson	Mickey Rooney	Cary Grant
10	Judy Garland	Judy Garland	Spencer Tracy	Clark Gable	Bette Davis
11	James Stewart	Tyrone Power	Dorothy Lamour	Judy Garland	Wallace Beery
12	Deanna Durbin	Alice Faye	Bing Crosby	Alice Faye	Dorothy Lamour
13	Alice Faye	James Stewart	Tyrone Power	Bette Davis	Walter Pidgeon
14	Errol Flynn	Errol Flynn	Walter Pidgeon	Tyrone Power	Judy Garland
15	Myrna Loy	Dorothy Lamour	Bette Davis	Alan Ladd	Alice Faye & Red Skelton
16	Dorothy Lamour	Betty Grable	Ann Sheridan	Cary Grant	Ginger Rogers
17	Cary Grant	Bing Crosby	Errol Flynn	Errol Flynn	Mickey Rooney
18	Bob Hope	Ginger Rogers	Wallace Beery	Wallace Beery	Claudette Colbert
19	Henry Fonda	Wallace Beery	Judy Garland	Spencer Tracy	Irene Dunne
20	Gary Cooper	Jack Benny	Red Skelton	Dorothy Lamour	Margaret O'Brien & James Cagney
21	Don Ameche	Robert Taylor	John Payne	Jean Arthur	Barry Fitzgerald
22	Jack Benny	Don Ameche	Rita Hayworth	Walter Pidgeon	Roy Rogers
23	Ginger Rogers	Cary Grant	Lana Turner	Claudette Colbert	Betty Hutton
24	Ann Sheridan	Deanna Durbin	Cary Grant	Red Skelton	Fred MacMurray & Ingrid Bergman
25	William Powell	William Powell	Humphrey Bogart	Lana Turner	Deanna Durbin

Place	1945	1946	1947	1948	1949
1	Bing Crosby	Bing Crosby	Bing Crosby	Bing Crosby	Bob Hope
2	Van Johnson	Ingrid Bergman	Betty Grable	Betty Grable	Bing Crosby
3	Greer Garson	Van Johnson	Ingrid Bergman	Bud Abbott and Lou Costello	Bud Abbott and Lou Costello
4	Betty Grable	Gary Cooper	Gary Cooper	Gary Cooper	John Wayne
5	Spencer Tracy	Bob Hope	Humphrey Bogart	Bob Hope	Gary Cooper
6	Humphrey Bogart & Gary Cooper	Humphrey Bogart	Bob Hope	Humphrey Bogart	Cary Grant
7	Bob Hope	Greer Garson	Clark Gable	Clark Gable	Betty Grable
8	Judy Garland	Margaret O'Brien	Gregory Peck	Cary Grant	Esther Williams
9	Margaret O'Brien	Betty Grable	Claudette Colbert	Spencer Tracy	Humphrey Bogart
10	Roy Rogers	Roy Rogers	Alan Ladd	Ingrid Bergman	Clark Gable
11	Abbott and Costello	Wallace Beery	Cary Grant	Esther Williams	James Stewart
12	Betty Hutton	Ray Milland	Roy Rogers	Gregory Peck	Randolph Scott
13	Ingrid Bergman	Clark Gable	Van Johnson	Lana Turner	Red Skelton
14	Bette Davis	Alan Ladd	Spencer Tracy	Alan Ladd	Clifton Webb
15	Alan Ladd	Bette Davis	Larry Parks	Red Skelton	Loretta Young
16	Dane Clark	Rita Hayworth	Abbott and Costello	John Wayne	June Allyson
17	Joseph Cotten	Cary Grant	Fred MacMurray	Roy Rogers	Alan Ladd
18	Claudette Colbert	Cornel Wilde	Rita Hayworth	Randolph Scott	Roy Rogers
19	Walter Pidgeon	Claudette Colbert & Gene Tierney (tied)	Margaret O'Brien	Rita Hayworth	Dan Dailey
20	Fred MacMurray	Abbott and Costello	Tyrone Power	Van Johnson	Olivia de Havilland
21	Danny Kaye	Spencer Tracy	Joan Crawford	Dennis Morgan	Robert Mitchum
22	Gregory Peck	Olivia de Havilland	Barbara Stanwyck	Loretta Young	Claudette Colbert
23	Ginger Rogers	Gregory Peck	Dana Andrews	Claudette Colbert	Gregory Peck
24	John Wayne	Errol Flynn	Esther Williams	Irene Dunne	Spencer Tracy
25	Mickey Rooney	Judy Garland	Cornel Wilde	James Stewart	Jane Wyman

Place	1950	1951	1952	1953	1954
1	John Wayne	John Wayne	Dean Martin and Jerry Lewis	Gary Cooper	John Wayne
2	Bob Hope	Dean Martin & Jerry Lewis	Gary Cooper	Dean Martin & Jerry Lewis	Dean Martin & Jerry Lewis
3	Bing Crosby	Betty Grable	John Wayne	John Wayne	Gary Cooper
4	Betty Grable	Abbott & Costello	Bing Crosby	Alan Ladd	James Stewart
5	James Stewart	Bing Crosby	Bob Hope	Bing Crosby	Marilyn Monroe
6	Abbott & Costello	Bob Hope	James Stewart	Marilyn Monroe	Alan Ladd
7	Clifton Webb	Randolph Scott	Doris Day	James Stewart	William Holden
8	Esther Williams	Gary Cooper	Gregory Peck	Bob Hope	Bing Crosby
9	Spencer Tracy	Doris Day	Susan Hayward	Susan Hayward	Jane Wyman
10	Randolph Scott	Spencer Tracy	Randolph Scott	Randolph Scott	Marlon Brando
11	Gary Cooper	Gregory Peck	Abbott and Costello	Doris Day	June Allyson
12	Gregory Peck	Esther Williams	Esther Williams	Esther Williams	Humphrey Bogart
13	Clark Gable	Mario Lanza	Cary Grant	Marjorie Main & Percy Kilbride	Burt Lancaster
14	June Allyson	Red Skelton	Betty Hutton	Gregory Peck	Susan Hayward
15	Betty Hutton	Marjorie Main	Jane Wyman	Ava Gardner	Percy Kilbride & Marjorie Main
16	Burt Lancaster	James Stewart	Alan Ladd	Clark Gable	Jeff Chandler
17	Red Skelton	Alan Ladd	Clark Gable	Burt Lancaster	Rock Hudson
18	Van Johnson	Clark Gable	Humphrey Bogart	Jeff Chandler	Doris Day
19	Roy Rogers	Susan Hayward	Stewart Granger	Jane Wyman	Clark Gable
20	Cary Grant	Jane Powell	Betty Grable	Abbott & Costello	Ava Gardner
21	Dan Dailey	Clifton Webb	Red Skelton	Stewart Granger	Gregory Peck
22	Barbara Stanwyck	Cary Grant	Jeff Chandler	Jane Russell	Randolph Scott
23	Joel McCrea	Jeanne Crain	Mario Lanza	Charlton Heston	Tony Curtis
24	Doris Day	Van Johnson	Burt Lancaster	Humphrey Bogart	Audrey Hepburn
25	Judy Garland	Burt Lancaster	Marjorie Main and Percy Kilbride	Rita Hayworth	Esther Williams

Place	1955	1956	1957	1958	1959
1	James Stewart	William Holden	Rock Hudson	Glenn Ford	Rock Hudson
2	Grace Kelly	John Wayne	John Wayne	Elizabeth Taylor	Cary Grant
3	John Wayne	James Stewart	Pat Boone	Jerry Lewis	James Stewart
4	William Holden	Burt Lancaster	Elvis Presley	Marlon Brando	Doris Day
5	Gary Cooper	Glenn Ford	Frank Sinatra	Rock Hudson	Debbie Reynolds
6	Marlon Brando	Dean Martin & Jerry Lewis	Gary Cooper	William Holden	Glenn Ford
7	Dean Martin & Jerry Lewis	Gary Cooper	William Holden	Brigitte Bardot	Frank Sinatra
8	Humphrey Bogart	Marilyn Monroe	James Stewart	Yul Brynner	John Wayne
9	June Allyson	Kim Novak	Jerry Lewis	James Stewart	Jerry Lewis
10	Clark Gable	Frank Sinatra	Yul Brynner	Frank Sinatra	Susan Hayward
11	Marilyn Monroe	Rock Hudson	Kim Novak	Pat Boone	Elizabeth Taylor
12	Glenn Ford	Doris Day	Deborah Kerr	Cary Grant	William Holden
13	Bing Crosby	Susan Hayward	Debbie Reynolds	Elvis Presley	Gary Cooper
14	Doris Day	Marlon Brando	Marlon Brando	John Wayne	Paul Newman
15	Audie Murphy	June Allyson	Burt Lancaster	Doris Day	Dean Martin
16	Burt Lancaster	Grace Kelly	Glenn Ford	Kim Novak	Sandra Dee
17	Alan Ladd	Audie Murphy	Doris Day	Ingrid Bergman	Brigitte Bardot
18	Jane Wyman	Jeff Chandler	Cary Grant	Gary Cooper	Tony Curtis
19	Susan Hayward	Gregory Peck	Clark Gable	Kirk Douglas	Shirley MacLaine
20	Jeff Chandler	Bing Crosby	Elizabeth Taylor	Burt Lancaster	Marilyn Monroe
21	Jane Russell	Yul Brynner	Audie Murphy	Joanne Woodward	Marlon Brando
22	Randolph Scott	Ernest Borgnine	Jeff Chandler	Gregory Peck	Pat Boone
23	Robert Mitchum	Jane Wyman	June Allyson	Paul Newman	Ingrid Bergman
24	Rock Hudson	Randolph Scott	Ingrid Bergman	Debbie Reynolds	Yul Brynner
25	Percy Kilbride & Marjorie Main	Alan Ladd	Kirk Douglas	Deborah Kerr	Kirk Douglas

Place	1960	1961	1962	1963	1964
1	Doris Day	Elizabeth Taylor	Doris Day	Doris Day	Doris Day
2	Rock Hudson	Rock Hudson	Rock Hudson	John Wayne	Jack Lemmon
3	Cary Grant	Doris Day	Cary Grant	Rock Hudson	Rock Hudson
4	Elizabeth Taylor	John Wayne	John Wayne	Jack Lemmon	John Wayne
5	Debbie Reynolds	Cary Grant	Elvis Presley	Cary Grant	Cary Grant
6	Tony Curtis	Sandra Dee	Elizabeth Taylor	Elizabeth Taylor	Elvis Presley
7	Sandra Dee	Jerry Lewis	Jerry Lewis	Elvis Presley	Shirley MacLaine
8	Frank Sinatra	William Holden	Frank Sinatra	Sandra Dee	Ann-Margret
9	Jack Lemmon	Tony Curtis	Sandra Dee	Paul Newman	Paul Newman
10	John Wayne	Elvis Presley	Burt Lancaster	Jerry Lewis	Richard Burton
11	Jerry Lewis	Burt Lancaster	Paul Newman	Gregory Peck	Elizabeth Taylor
12	Glenn Ford	Frank Sinatra	Charlton Heston	Shirley MacLaine	Debbie Reynolds
13	Paul Newman	Debbie Reynolds	James Stewart	Frank Sinatra	Jerry Lewis
14	William Holden	Jack Lemmon	Jack Lemmon	James Stewart	Hayley Mills
15	Kirk Douglas	Glenn Ford	William Holden	Hayley Mills	Carroll Baker
16	Charlton Heston	Kirk Douglas	Debbie Reynolds	James Garner	James Garner
17	Shirley MacLaine	Paul Newman	Kirk Douglas	Debbie Reynolds	Frank Sinatra
18	James Stewart	Charlton Heston	Tony Curtis	Burt Lancaster	Gregory Peck
19	Burt Lancaster	Susan Hayward	Natalie Wood	Glenn Ford	Glenn Ford
20	Joanne Woodward	Gregory Peck	Hayley Mills	Troy Donahue	Audrey Hepburn
21	Elvis Presley	Marlon Brando	Glenn Ford	Tony Curtis	Natalie Wood
22	Pat Boone	James Stewart	Kim Novak	Kirk Douglas	Tony Curtis
23	Yul Brynner	Shirley MacLaine	Shirley MacLaine	Charlton Heston	James Stewart
24	Robert Mitchum	Troy Donahue	Audrey Hepburn	Henry Fonda	Sophia Loren
25	Gary Cooper	Natalie Wood	Gregory Peck	Richard Burton	Burt Lancaster

Place	1965	1966	1967	1968	1969
1	Sean Connery	Julie Andrews	Julie Andrews	Sidney Poitier	Paul Newman
2	John Wayne	Sean Connery	Lee Marvin	Paul Newman	John Wayne
3	Doris Day	Elizabeth Taylor	Paul Newman	Julie Andrews	Steve McQueen
4	Julie Andrews	Jack Lemmon	Dean Martin	John Wayne	Dustin Hoffman
5	Jack Lemmon	Richard Burton	Sean Connery	Clint Eastwood	Clint Eastwood
6	Elvis Presley	Cary Grant	Elizabeth Taylor	Dean Martin	Sidney Poitier
7	Cary Grant	John Wayne	Sidney Poitier	Steve McQueen	Lee Marvin
8	James Stewart	Doris Day	John Wayne	Jack Lemmon	Jack Lemmon
9	Elizabeth Taylor	Paul Newman	Richard Burton	Lee Marvin	Katharine Hepburn
10	Richard Burton	Elvis Presley	Steve McQueen	Elizabeth Taylor	Barbra Streisand
11	Rock Hudson	Dean Martin	Jane Fonda	Faye Dunaway	Dean Martin
12	The Beatles	Steve McQueen	James Coburn	Elvis Presley	Joanne Woodward
13	Peter Sellers	Frank Sinatra	Jack Lemmon	Frank Sinatra	Walter Matthau
14	Frank Sinatra	Sophia Loren	Julie Christie	Doris Day	Richard Burton
15	Shirley MacLaine	Peter Sellers	Michael Caine	Richard Burton	Raquel Welch
16	Jerry Lewis	James Stewart	Elvis Presley	Sean Connery	Jane Fonda
17	Ann-Margret	Dick Van Dyke	Cary Grant	Jane Fonda	Elizabeth Taylor
18	James Garner	Rock Hudson	Sandy Dennis	Katharine Hepburn	Peter Fonda
19	Debbie Reynolds	Audrey Hepburn	Frank Sinatra	Warren Beatty	Julie Andrews
20	Rex Harrison	Rex Harrison	Bob Hope	Audrey Hepburn	Faye Dunaway
21	Paul Newman	Jerry Lewis	Shirley MacLaine	Raquel Welch	Mia Farrow
22	Steve McQueen	Charlton Heston	Audrey Hepburn	Joanne Woodward	Elvis Presley
23	Peter O'Toole	Ann-Margret	Dick Van Dyke	Julie Christie	Sandy Dennis
24	Tony Curtis	Natalie Wood	Jerry Lewis	Mia Farrow	Warren Beatty
25	Charlton Heston	Shirley MacLaine	Doris Day	Walter Matthau	James Garner

Place	1970	1971	1972	1973	1974
1	Paul Newman	John Wayne	Clint Eastwood	Clint Eastwood	Robert Redford
2	Clint Eastwood	Clint Eastwood	George C. Scott	Ryan O'Neal	Clint Eastwood
3	Steve McQueen	Paul Newman	Gene Hackman	Steve McQueen	Paul Newman
4	John Wayne	Steve McQueen	John Wayne	Burt Reynolds	Barbra Streisand
5	Elliott Gould	George C. Scott	Barbra Streisand	Robert Redford	Steve McQueen
6	Dustin Hoffman	Dustin Hoffman	Marlon Brando	Barbra Streisand	Burt Reynolds
7	Lee Marvin	Walter Matthau	Paul Newman	Paul Newman	Charles Bronson
8	Jack Lemmon	Ali MacGraw	Steve McQueen	Charles Bronson	Jack Nicholson
9	Barbra Streisand	Sean Connery	Dustin Hoffman	John Wayne	Al Pacino
10	Walter Matthau	Lee Marvin	Goldie Hawn	Marlon Brando	John Wayne
11	Robert Redford	Ryan O'Neal	Robert Redford	Gene Hackman	Dustin Hoffman
12	George C. Scott	Candice Bergen	Ryan O'Neal	Liza Minnelli	Woody Allen
13	Sidney Poitier	Jack Nicholson	Woody Allen	Roger Moore	James Caan
14	Dean Martin	Sidney Poitier	Lee Marvin	Diana Ross	Liza Minnelli
15	Raquel Welch	Robert Redford	Ali MacGraw	Walter Matthau	Charlton Heston
16	Richard Burton	Barbra Streisand	Sean Connery	George C. Scott	Gene Hakcman
17	James Stewart	James Garner	Liza Minnelli	Ali MacGraw	Jack Lemmon
18	Peter Fonda	Elliott Gould	Walter Matthau	Woody Allen	Faye Dunaway
19	Julie Andrews	Ann-Margret	Raquel Welch	Dyan Cannon	George C. Scott
20	Katharine Hepburn	Dean Martin	Jane Fonda	Jane Fonda	Walter Matthau
21	Elvis Presley	Jane Fonda	Jack Lemmon	Glenda Jackson	Marlon Brando
22	Jane Fonda	Donald Sutherland	Sidney Poitier	Al Pacino	George Segal
23	Jon Voight	Jack Lemmon	Burt Reynolds	James Coburn	Ryan O'Neal
24	Elizabeth Taylor	Dyan Cannon	Charlton Heston	Goldie Hawn	Roger Moore
25	Alan Arkin	Elvis Presley	Elvis Presley	Dustin Hoffman	Elliott Gould

Place	1975	1976	1977	1978	1979
1	Robert Redford	Robert Redford	Sylvester Stallone	Burt Reynolds	Burt Reynolds
2	Barbra Streisand	Jack Nicholson	Barbra Streisand	John Travolta	Clint Eastwood
3	Al Pacino	Dustin Hoffman	Clint Eastwood	Richard Dreyfuss	Jane Fonda
4	Charles Bronson	Clint Eastwood	Burt Reynolds	Warren Beatty	Woody Allen
5	Paul Newman	Mel Brooks	Robert Redford	Clint Eastwood	Barbra Streisand
6	Clint Eastwood	Burt Reynolds	Woody Allen	Woody Allen	Sylvester Stallone
7	Burt Reynolds	Al Pacino	Mel Brooks	Diane Keaton	John Travolta
8	Woody Allen	Tatum O'Neal	Al Pacino	Jane Fonda	Jill Clayburgh
9	Steve McQueen	Woody Allen	Diane Keaton	Peter Sellers	Roger Moore
10	Gene Hackman	Charles Bronson	Robert De Niro	Barbra Streisand	Mel Brooks
11	Jack Nicholson	Barbra Streisand	Jack Nicholson	Mel Brooks	Robert Redford
12	James Caan	Liza Minnelli	Charles Bronson	Robert Redford	Diane Keaton
13	Dustin Hoffman	Faye Dunaway	Dustin Hoffman	Walter Matthau	Sally Field
14	Faye Dunaway	Peter Sellers	Kris Kristofferson	Paul Newman	Warren Beatty
15	John Wayne	Gregory Peck	Faye Dunaway	Sylvester Stallone	Robert De Niro
16	Liza Minnelli	Jeff Bridges	Roger Moore	Kris Kristofferson	Jon Voight
17	Warren Beatty	Gene Wilder	Paul Newman	Faye Dunaway	Al Pacino
18	Tom Laughlin	Sissy Spacek	Jacqueline Bisset	Jill Clayburgh	Richard Dreyfuss
19	Peter Sellers	Eileen Brennan	Liza Minnelli	Jacqueline Bisset	Peter Sellers
20	Raquel Welch	Michael York	Peter Sellers	Sally Field	Dustin Hoffman
21	Candice Bergen	Ed Asner	Jane Fonda	Jack Nicholson	Jack Nicholson
22	Sean Connery	Robert Logan	Sissy Spacek	Jon Voight	George Hamilton
23	Marlon Brando	Robert Carradine	John Wayne	George Burns	Nick Nolte
24	Peter Fonda	Raquel Welch	Gene Wilder	Henry Winkler	Paul Newman
25	Diana Ross	Marlon Brando	Robby Benson	John Wayne	Peter Falk

Place	1980	1981	1982	1983	1984
1	Burt Reynolds	Burt Reynolds	Burt Reynolds	Clint Eastwood	Clint Eastwood
2	Robert Redford	Clint Eastwood	Clint Eastwood	Eddie Murphy	Bill Murray
3	Clint Eastwood	Dudley Moore	Sylvester Stallone	Sylvester Stallone	Harrison Ford
4	Jane Fonda	Dolly Parton	Dudley Moore	Burt Reynolds	Eddie Murphy
5	Dustin Hoffman	Jane Fonda	Richard Pryor	John Travolta	Sally Field
6	John Travolta	Harrison Ford	Dolly Parton	Dustin Hoffman	Burt Reynolds
7	Sally Field	Alan Alda	Jane Fonda	Harrison Ford	Robert Redford
8	Sissy Spacek	Bo Derek	Richard Gere	Richard Gere	Prince
9	Barbra Streisand	Goldie Hawn	Paul Newman	Chevy Chase	Dan Aykroyd
10	Steve Martin	Bill Murray	Harrison Ford	Tom Cruise	Meryl Streep
11	John Belushi	Cheech & Chong	Goldie Hawn	Sean Connery	Debra Winger
12	Walter Matthau	Brooke Shields	Katharine Hepburn	Richard Pryor	Sylvester Stallone
13	Cheech & Chong	Richard Pryor	Alan Alda	Meryl Streep	Tom Hanks
14	Jill Clayburgh	John Belushi	Sally Field	Debra Winger	Arnold Schwarzenegger
15	Meryl Streep	Christopher Reeve	Cheech & Chong	Roger Moore	Shirley MacLaine
16	Bette Midler	Sally Field	Meryl Streep	Paul Newman	Steve Martin
17	George Burns	Meryl Streep	Robert Redford	Teri Garr	Tom Cruise
18	Brooke Shields	Sissy Spacek	Christopher Reeve	Dudley Moore	Jack Nicholson
19	Jack Nicholson	Robert Redford	Dustin Hoffman	Barbra Streisand	Richard Gere
20	Al Pacino	Roger Moore	Timothy Hutton	Goldie Hawn	Dolly Parton
21	Dudley Moore	Marsha Mason	Roger Moore	Louis Gossett Jr.	Robert De Niro
22	Chevy Chase	Chuck Norris	Chuck Norris	Al Pacino	Chuck Norris
23	Woody Allen	Gene Wilder	Brooke Shields	Mark Hamill	Kevin Bacon
24	Robert De Niro	Steve Martin	Al Pacino	Jane Fonda	George Burns
25	Goldie Hawn	Lily Tomlin	Julie Andrews	Dan Aykroyd	Dustin Hoffman

Place	1985	1986	1987	1988	1989
1	Sylvester Stallone	Tom Cruise	Eddie Murphy	Tom Cruise	Jack Nicholson
2	Eddie Murphy	Eddie Murphy	Michael Douglas	Eddie Murphy	Tom Cruise
3	Clint Eastwood	Paul Hogan	Michael J. Fox	Tom Hanks	Robin Williams
4	Michael J. Fox	Rodney Dangerfield	Arnold Schwarzenegger	Arnold Schwarzenegger	Michael Douglas
5	Chevy Chase	Bette Midler	Paul Hogan	Paul Hogan	Tom Hanks
6	Arnold Schwarzenegger	Sylvester Stallone	Tom Cruise	Danny DeVito	Michael J. Fox
7	Chuck Norris	Clint Eastwood	Glenn Close	Bette Midler	Eddie Murphy
8	Harrison Ford	Whoopi Goldberg	Sylvester Stallone	Robin Williams	Mel Gibson
9	Michael Douglas	Kathleen Turner	Cher	Tom Selleck	Sean Connery
10	Meryl Streep	Paul Newman	Mel Gibson	Dustin Hoffman	Kathleen Turner
11	Robert Redford	Michael J. Fox	Patrick Swayze	Cher	Bette Midler
12	Sally Field	Sigourney Weaver	Kathleen Turner	Michael Douglas	Dustin Hoffman
13	Kathleen Turner	Robert Redford	Clint Eastwood	Sylvester Stallone	Michael Keaton
14	Dan Aykroyd	Ralph Macchio	Tom Selleck	Michael J. Fox	Danny DeVito
15	Bill Murray	Chevy Chase	Bette Midler	John Candy	Chevy Chase
16	Jack Nicholson	Jane Fonda	Danny DeVito	Bruce Willis	Steve Martin
17	Jessica Lange	Matthew Broderick	Steve Martin	Mel Gibson	Bill Murray
18	Goldie Hawn	Michael Douglas	John Candy	Glenn Close	Kevin Costner
19	Charles Bronson	Harrison Ford	Meryl Streep	Bill Murray	Arnold Schwarzenegger
20	Cher	Woody Allen	Kevin Costner	Sigourney Weaver	Michelle Pfeiffer
21	Mel Gibson	Rob Lowe	Jack Nicholson	Harrison Ford	John Candy
22	Paul Reubens	Leonard Nimoy	Dan Aykroyd	Clint Eastwood	Bruce Willis
23	Burt Reynolds	William Shatner	Richard Dreyfuss	Patrick Swayze	John Travolta
24	Roger Moore	Meryl Streep	William Hurt	Meryl Streep	Meryl Streep
25	Sissy Spacek	William Hurt	Harrison Ford	Steve Martin	Sylvester Stallone

Place	1990	1991	1992	1993	1994
1	Arnold Schwarzenegger	Kevin Costner	Tom Cruise	Clint Eastwood	Tom Hanks
2	Julia Roberts	Arnold Schwarzenegger	Mel Gibson	Tom Cruise	Jim Carrey
3	Bruce Willis	Robin Williams	Kevin Costner	Robin Williams	Arnold Schwarzenegger
4	Tom Cruise	Julia Roberts	Jack Nicholson	Kevin Costner	Tom Cruise
5	Mel Gibson	Macaulay Culkin	Macaulay Culkin	Harrison Ford	Harrison Ford
6	Kevin Costner	Jodie Foster	Whoopi Goldberg	Julia Roberts	Tim Allen
7	Patrick Swayze	Billy Crystal	Michael Douglas	Tom Hanks	Mel Gibson
8	Sean Connery	Dustin Hoffman	Clint Eastwood	Mel Gibson	Jodie Foster
9	Harrison Ford	Robert De Niro	Steven Seagal	Whoopi Goldberg	Michael Douglas
10	Richard Gere	Mel Gibson	Robin Williams	Sylvester Stallone	Tommy Lee Jones
11	Michael J. Fox	Steve Martin	Sharon Stone	Meg Ryan	Robin Williams
12	Demi Moore	Harrison Ford	Michelle Pfeiffer	Arnold Schwarzenegger	Demi Moore
13	Macaulay Culkin	Michael J. Fox	Harrison Ford	Demi Moore	Keanu Reeves
14	Robin Williams	Nick Nolte	Danny DeVito	Macaulay Culkin	Kevin Costner
15	Tom Hanks	Patrick Swayze	Steve Martin	Jack Nicholson	Julia Roberts
16	Michelle Pfeiffer	Barbra Streisand	Michael Keaton	Al Pacino	Sylvester Stallone
17	Steven Seagal	Danny DeVito	Sean Connery	Denzel Washington	Meg Ryan
18	Sylvester Stallone	Cher	Joe Pesci	Sean Connery	Jack Nicholson
19	Bette Midler	Demi Moore	Demi Moore	Michael Douglas	Jean-Claude Van Damme
20	Michael Douglas	Anthony Hopkins	Eddie Murphy	Tommy Lee Jones	Brad Pitt
21	Al Pacino	Michelle Pfeiffer	Billy Crystal	Robert Redford	Whoopi Goldberg
22	Eddie Murphy	Bill Murray	Daniel Day-Lewis	Sally Field	Meryl Streep
23	Winona Ryder	Sean Connery	Julia Roberts	Gene Hackman	Sharon Stone
24	Robert De Niro	Anjelica Huston	Dana Carvey	Jodie Foster	Hugh Grant
25	Meryl Streep	Warren Beatty	Al Pacino	Anthony Hopkins	Anthony Hopkins

Place	1995	1996	1997	1998	1999
1	Tom Hanks	Tom Cruise & Mel Gibson (tied)	Harrison Ford	Tom Hanks	Julia Roberts
2	Jim Carrey	Tom Cruise & Mel Gibson (tied)	Julia Roberts	Jim Carrey	Tom Hanks
3	Brad Pitt	John Travolta	Leonardo DiCaprio	Leonardo DiCaprio	Adam Sandler
4	Harrison Ford	Arnold Schwarzenegger	Will Smith	Robin Williams	Bruce Willis
5	Robin Williams	Sandra Bullock	Tom Cruise	Meg Ryan	Mike Myers
6	Sandra Bullock	Robin Williams	Jack Nicholson	Mel Gibson	Tom Cruise
7	Mel Gibson	Sean Connery	Jim Carrey	Adam Sandler	Will Smith
8	Demi Moore	Harrison Ford	John Travolta	Eddie Murphy	Mel Gibson
9	John Travolta	Kevin Costner	Robin Williams	Cameron Diaz	Meg Ryan
10	Kevin Costner & Michael Douglas (tied)	Michelle Pfeiffer	Tommy Lee Jones	Julia Roberts	Sandra Bullock
11	Kevin Costner & Michael Douglas (tied)	Jim Carrey	Brad Pitt and Neve Campbell (tied)	John Travolta	Ashley Judd
12	Bruce Willis	Michael Douglas and Demi Moore (tied)	Brad Pitt and Neve Campbell (tied)	Robert Redford	Gwyneth Paltrow
13	Val Kilmer	Michael Douglas and Demi Moore (tied)	Pierce Brosnan	Harrison Ford	Robin Williams
14	Michelle Pfeiffer	Brad Pitt	Jodie Foster	Will Smith	Matt Damon
15	Julia Roberts	Glenn Close and Denzel Washington (tied)	Nicolas Cage and Tim Allen (tied)	Bruce Willis	Pierce Brosnan
16	Morgan Freeman	Glenn Close and Denzel Washington (tied)	Nicolas Cage and Tim Allen (tied)	Sandra Bullock	Jim Carrey
17	Pierce Brosnan	Goldie Hawn	Michael Douglas	Matt Damon	Harrison Ford
18	Anthony Hopkins	Eddie Murphy	Demi Moore	Denzel Washington	Liam Neeson
19	Robert De Niro	Rene Russo, Meg Ryan and Will Smith (tied)	Michelle Pfeiffer	Anne Heche	Anthony Hopkins
20	Steven Seagal, Winona Ryder and Meg Ryan (tied)	Rene Russo, Meg Ryan and Will Smith (tied)	Sandra Bullock	Gwyneth Paltrow	Keanu Reeves
21	Steven Seagal, Winona Ryder and Meg Ryan (tied)	Rene Russo, Meg Ryan and Will Smith (tied)	Cameron Diaz	-	-
22	Steven Seagal, Winona Ryder and Meg Ryan (tied)	Helen Hunt	Brendan Fraser	-	-
23	Steve Martin	Pierce Brosnan	Denzel Washington	-	-
24	Tommy Lee Jones	Bruce Willis	Robert De Niro	-	-
25	Denzel Washington	Jack Nicholson	Meg Ryan	-	-

Place	2000
1	Tom Cruise
2	Julia Roberts
3	George Clooney
4	Eddie Murphy
5	Russell Crowe
6	Mel Gibson
7	Martin Lawrence
8	Tom Hanks
9	Jim Carrey
10	Harrison Ford
11	
12	Michelle Pfeiffer
13	Mark Wahlberg
14	Jennifer Lopez
15	
16	Nicolas Cage
17	Denzel Washington
18	Angelina Jolie
19	Robert de Niro
20	Ben Stiller
21	-
22	-
23	-
24	-
25	-

== Top ten Western stars ==
For a number of years, there was also a poll for the top ten Western stars in the United States.

Place	1936	1937	1938	1939	1940
1	Buck Jones	Gene Autry	Gene Autry	Gene Autry	Gene Autry
2	George O'Brien	William Boyd	William Boyd	William Boyd	William Boyd
3	Gene Autry	Buck Jones	Buck Jones	Roy Rogers	Roy Rogers
4	William Boyd	Dick Foran	George O'Brien	George O'Brien	George O'Brien
5	Ken Maynard	George O'Brien	Three Mesquiteers	Charles Starrett	Charles Starrett
6	Dick Foran	Tex Ritter	Charles Starrett	Three Mesquiteers	Johnny Mack Brown
7	John Wayne	Bob Steele	Bob Steele	Tex Ritter	Tex Ritter
8	Tim McCoy	The Three Mesquiteers	Smith Ballew	Buck Jones	Three Mesquiteers
9	Hoot Gibson	Charles Starrett	Tex Ritter	John Wayne	Smiley Burnette
10	Buster Crabbe	Ken Maynard	Dick Foran	Bob Baker	Bill Elliott

Place	1941	1942	1943	1944	1945
1	Gene Autry	Gene Autry	Roy Rogers	Roy Rogers	Roy Rogers
2	William Boyd	Roy Rogers	William Boyd	William Boyd	Gabby Hayes
3	Roy Rogers	William Boyd	Smiley Burnette	Smiley Burnette	William Boyd
4	Charles Starrett	Smiley Burnette	George "Gabby" Hayes	Gabby Hayes	Bill Elliot
5	Smiley Burnette	Charles Starrett	Johnny Mack Brown	Bill Elliott	Smiley Burnett
6	Tim Holt	Johnny Mack Brown	Tim Holt	Johnny Mack Brown	Johnny Mack Brown
7	Johnny Mack Brown	Bill Elliott	The Three Mesquiteers	Red Barry	Charles Starrett
8	Three Mesquiteers	Tim Holt	Red Barry	Charles Starrett	Red Barrett
9	Bill Elliott	Don "Red" Barry	Bill Elliott	Russell Hayden	Tex Ritter
10	Tex Ritter	Three Mesquiteers	Russell Hayden	Tex Ritter	Rod Cameron

Place	1946	1947	1948	1949	1950
1	Roy Rogers	Roy Rogers	Roy Rogers	Roy Rogers	Roy Rogers
2	Bill Elliot	Gene Autry	Gene Autry	Gene Autry	Gene Autry
3	Gene Autry	William Boyd	Bill Elliot	Gabby Hayes	Gabby Hayes
4	Gabby Hayes	Bill Elliot	Gabby Hayes	Tim Holt	Bill Elliott
5	Smiley Burnett	Gabby Hayes	William Boyd	Bill Elliott	William Boyd
6	Charles Starrett	Charles Starrett	Charles Starrett	Charles Starrett	Tim Holt
7	Johnny Mack Brown	Smiley Burnett	Tim Holt	William Boyd	Charles Starrett
8	Sunset Carson	Johnny Mack Brown	Johnny Mack Brown	Johnny Mack Brown	Johnny Mack Brown
9	Fuzzy Knight	Dale Evans	Smiley Burnett	Smiley Burnett	Smiley Burnett
10	Eddie Dean	Eddie Dean	Andy Devine	Andy Devine	Dale Evans

Place	1951	1952	1953	1954
1	Roy Rogers	Roy Rogers	Roy Rogers	Roy Rogers
2	Gene Autry	Gene Autry	Gene Autry	Gene Autry
3	Tim Holt	Rex Allen	Rex Allen	Rex Allen
4	Charles Starrett	Bill Elliott	Bill Elliott	Bill Elliott
5	Rex Allen	Tim Holt	Allan Lane	Gabby Hayes
6	Bill Elliott	Gabby Hayes		
7	Smiley Burnette	Smiley Burnette		
8	Allan Lane	Charles Starrett		
9	Dale Evans	Dale Evans		
10	Gabby Hayes	William Boyd		

== Top Ten Money Makers in Britain ==
The Motion Picture Herald published a similar list for the UK, listing the most popular stars at the British box office, including the most popular British stars.

Place	1931		1934	
Place	Female stars	Male stars	Female stars	Male stars
1	Norma Shearer	Ronald Colman	Norma Shearer	George Arliss
2	Constance Bennett	Clive Brook	Marie Dressler	Clark Gable
3	Marie Dressler	George Arliss	Greta Garbo	Wallace Beery
4	Ruth Chatterton	Robert Montgomery	Kay Francis	Clive Brook
5	Janet Gaynor	Maurice Chevalier	Marlene Dietrich	Robert Montgomery
6	Greta Garbo	John Boles	Katharine Hepburn	Ronald Colman
7	Jeanette MacDonald	Ralph Lynn	Gracie Fields	Jack Hulbert
8	Joan Crawford	Tom Walls	Janet Gaynor	Lionel Barrymore
9	Ann Harding	William Powell	Joan Crawford	Charles Laughton
10	Marlene Dietrich	Wallace Beery	Claudette Colbert	Tom Walls

Place	1936			1937		
Place	British stars	International stars	Western stars	British stars	International stars	Western stars
1	Gracie Fields	Shirley Temple	Buck Jones	Gracie Fields	Shirley Temple	Gene Autry
2	Jessie Matthews	Fred Astaire and Ginger Rogers	Ken Maynard	George Formby	Clark Gable	Buck Jones
3	Jack Hulbert	Gracie Fields	Tim McCoy	Jessie Matthews	Gracie Fields	Dick Foran
4	George Formby	Clark Gable	George O’Brien	Will Hay	Gary Cooper	William Boyd
5	Robert Donat	Laurel and Hardy	John Wayne	Jack Buchanan	George Formby	George O’Brien
6	Jack Buchanan	Jessie Matthews	Dick Foran	George Arliss	William Powell	John Wayne
7	Tom Walls and Ralph Lynn (as a team)	James Cagney	Tom Mix	Charles Laughton and Tom Walls (tied)	Jeanette MacDonald	Tim McCoy
8	Will Hay	Wallace Beery	Randolph Scott	Anna Neagle	Robert Taylor	Ken Maynard
9	George Arliss	Greta Garbo	William Boyd	Jack Hulbert	Astaire and Rogers	Harry Carey
10	Sydney Howard	Norma Shearer	Hoot Gibson	Paul Robeson	Laurel and Hardy	Hoot Gibson

Place	1938			1939		
Place	British stars	International stars	Western stars	British stars	International stars	Western stars
1	George Formby	Shirley Temple	Gene Autry	George Formby	Deanna Durbin	William Boyd
2	Gracie Fields	Jeanette MacDonald	William Boyd	Gracie Fields	Mickey Rooney	Gene Autry
3	Will Hay	Spencer Tracy	Dick Foran	Robert Donat	Shirley Temple	Dick Foran
4	Jessie Matthews	Clark Gable	Buck Jones	Will Hay	Robert Taylor	George O’Brien
5	Sandy Powell	George Formby	Tim McCoy	Anna Neagle	Jeanette MacDonald	Buck Jones
6	Jack Buchanan	Deanna Durbin	Ken Maynard	Leslie Howard	Spencer Tracy	Ken Maynard
7	Charles Laughton	Robert Taylor	The Three Mesquiteers	Charles Laughton	Errol Flynn	The Three Mesquiteers
8	Anna Neagle	Ronald Colman	Tex Ritter	Gordon Harker	George Formby	Tim McCoy
9	Will Fyffe	Gary Cooper	George O’Brien	Ralph Richardson	Nelson Eddy	Bob Baker
10	George Arliss	William Powell	John Wayne	Will Fyffe	Gary Cooper	Tex Ritter

Place	1940			1941		
Place	British stars	International stars	Western stars	British stars	International stars	Western stars
1	George Formby	Mickey Rooney	Gene Autry	George Formby	Mickey Rooney	Gene Autry
2	Robert Donat	Deanna Durbin	William Boyd	Arthur Lucan	Deanna Durbin	William Boyd
3	Gracie Fields	Spencer Tracy	George O’Brien	Arthur Askey	Spencer Tracy	John Wayne
4	Arthur Askey	Jeanette MacDonald	Charles Starrett	Robert Donat	George Formby	George O’Brien
5	Arthur Lucan and Kitty McShane (as a team)	George Formby	The Three Mesquiteers	Will Hay	Jeanette MacDonald	Charles Starrett
6	Charles Laughton	Nelson Eddy	Bob Baker	Conrad Veidt & Gordon Harker (tied)	Errol Flynn	The Three Mesquiteers
7	Will Hay	Errol Flynn	John Wayne	Anna Neagle	Nelson Eddy	Dick Foran
8	Conrad Veidt	James Cagney	Johnny Mack Brown	Gracie Fields	Gary Cooper	Buck Jones
9	Gordon Harker	Gary Cooper	Buck Jones	Charles Laughton	James Cagney	Johnny Mack Brown
10	Anna Neagle	Bing Crosby	Dick Foran	Leslie Howard	Bing Crosby	Bob Baker
11	Barry K. Barnes	Shirley Temple	Ken Maynard	Clive Brook	Judy Garland	
12	Ralph Richardson	Tyrone Power		Margaret Lockwood	Bette Davis	
13	Jack Buchanan	Clark Gable		Michael Redgrave	Robert Taylor	
14	Will Fyffe	Robert Donat		Wendy Hiller	Charles Boyer	
15	Margaret Lockwood	Bette Davis		Rex Harrison	Tyrone Power	
16	Michael Redgrave	Wallace Beery		Emlyn Williams	Alice Faye	
17	Rex Harrison	Dorothy Lamour		Laurence Olivier	Arthur Lucan	
18	Leslie Howard	Greta Garbo		Barry K. Barnes	Don Ameche	
19	The Crazy Gang	Gracie Fields		The Crazy Gang	Charles Chaplin	
20	Paul Robeson	Alice Faye		Diana Wynyard	Jeanette MacDonald and Nelson Eddy	
21	Sandy Powell	Myrna Loy		Will Fyffe	James Stewart	
22	Emlyn Williams	Judy Garland		Vivien Leigh	Laurence Olivier	
23	Leslie Banks	Ginger Rogers		Frank Randle and Harry Korris	Dorothy Lamour	
24	Merle Oberon	Laurel and Hardy		Wilfrid Lawson	Clark Gable	
25	Clive Brook	Victor McLaglen		John Clements	Vivien Leigh	

Place	1942			1943		
Place	British stars	International stars	Western stars	British stars	International stars	Western stars
1	George Formby	Mickey Rooney	Gene Autry	George Formby	Greer Garson	Gene Autry
2	Leslie Howard	Abbott and Costello	William Boyd	Leslie Howard	Bing Crosby	Roy Rogers
3	Arthur Lucan	Spencer Tracy	Roy Rogers	Noël Coward	Abbott and Costello	William Boyd
4	Will Hay	Deanna Durbin	Charles Starrett	Eric Portman	Bob Hope	Johnny Mack Brown
5	Arthur Askey	Jeanette MacDonald	John Wayne	Robert Donat	Betty Grable	Randolph Scott
6	Robert Donat	George Formby	Johnny Mack Brown	Arthur Lucan	Mickey Rooney	Charles Starrett
7	Deborah Kerr	Bette Davis	George Montgomery	Margaret Lockwood	Dorothy Lamour	John Wayne
8	Robert Newton	Leslie Howard	Randolph Scott	Anton Walbrook	Bette Davis	Buck Jones
9	Eric Portman	Gary Cooper	Dick Foran	Arthur Askey	Tyrone Power	James Craig
10	Michael Redgrave	Dorothy Lamour	William Holden	John Mills	James Cagney	Dick Foran

Place	1944			1945		
Place	British stars	International stars	Western stars	British stars	International stars	Western stars
1	James Mason	Bing Crosby	Roy Rogers	James Mason	Bing Crosby	Roy Rogers
2	David Niven	Betty Grable	William Boyd	Stewart Granger	Bette Davis	William Boyd
3	George Formby	Greer Garson	Gene Autry	Margaret Lockwood	Greer Garson	Gene Autry
4	Eric Portman	Deanna Durbin	Richard Dix	John Mills	Humphrey Bogart	Johnny Mack Brown
5	Laurence Olivier	Bette Davis	John Wayne	Phyllis Calvert	Bob Hope	John Wayne
6	Margaret Lockwood	Bob Hope	Gary Cooper	Rex Harrison	Betty Grable	Gary Cooper
7	Robert Donat	Humphrey Bogart	Randolph Scott	Laurence Olivier	Spencer Tracy & James Mason	Randolph Scott
8	Phyllis Calvert	Gary Cooper	Johnny Mack Brown	Anna Neagle	Abbott and Costello	Charles Starrett
9	Anna Neagle	Spencer Tracy	Joel McCrea	George Formby	Stewart Granger	Tim McCoy
10	Robert Newton	Abbott and Costello	Albert Dekker	Eric Portman	Joan Fontaine	Joel McCrea

Place	1946				
Place	British stars	International stars	Western stars	Most popular male actors*	Most popular female actors*
1	James Mason	James Mason	Roy Rogers	James Mason	Margaret Lockwood
2	Margaret Lockwood	Bing Crosby	Gary Cooper	Stewart Granger	Ingrid Bergman
3	Stewart Granger	Margaret Lockwood	Randolph Scott	Ray Milland	Bette Davis
4	Michael Redgrave	Greer Garson	Joel McCrea	Alan Ladd	Phyllis Calvert
5	Anna Neagle	Bette Davis	John Wayne	Bing Crosby	Greer Garson
6	Phyllis Calvert	Stewart Granger	Johnny Mack Brown	John Mills	Patricia Roc
7	Rex Harrison	Ingrid Bergman	Gene Autry	Laurence Olivier	Vivien Leigh
8	John Mills	Alan Ladd	William Boyd	Humphrey Bogart	Jeanne Crain
9	Robert Donat	Bob Hope	Wallace Beery	Spencer Tracy	Joan Fontaine
10	Eric Portman	Van Johnson	Errol Flynn	Gary Cooper	Dorothy McGuire
11				Michael Redgrave	Anna Neagle
12					
13					
14				Rex Harrison	Ann Todd
15					Ida Lupino
16					
17				David Niven	
18					
19					
20					
21				Eric Portman	

*Another poll by Sidney L. Bernstein of his theatre group listed these actors.

Place	1947			1948	
Place	British stars	International stars	Western stars	British stars	International stars
1	James Mason	Bing Crosby	Roy Rogers	Anna Neagle	Bing Crosby
2	Anna Neagle	James Mason	Gene Autry	Margaret Lockwood	Anna Neagle
3	Margaret Lockwood	Anna Neagle	William Boyd	John Mills	Margaret Lockwood
4	John Mills	Margaret Lockwood	Randolph Scott	Michael Wilding	John Mills
5	Stewart Granger	Bette Davis	Gary Cooper	Stewart Granger	Michael Wilding
6	Patricia Roc	John Mills	Ray Milland	Michael Denison	Fredric March
7	Michael Wilding	Alan Ladd	Johnny Mack Brown	Jack Warner	Bob Hope
8	Deborah Kerr	Humphrey Bogart	John Wayne	Googie Withers	Danny Kaye
9	Robert Newton	Ingrid Bergman	Henry Fonda	Patricia Roc	Myrna Loy
10	Trevor Howard	Bob Hope	Fred MacMurray	James Mason and Dennis Price (tied)	Gregory Peck

Place	1949			1950		
Place	British stars	International stars	Western stars	British stars	International stars	Western Stars
1	Anna Neagle	Anna Neagle	John Wayne	Anna Neagle	Bob Hope	John Wayne
2	Michael Wilding	Michael Wilding	Roy Rogers	Jean Simmons	Abbott & Costello	James Stewart
3	John Mills	Bob Hope	William Boyd	Jack Warner	Anna Neagle	Randolph Scott
4	Jean Simmons	Danny Kaye	Randolph Scott	John Mills	Jean Simmons	Roy Rogers
5	Margaret Lockwood	Bing Crosby	Alan Ladd	Robert Newton	Jack Warner	Joel McCrea
6	Richard Attenborough	Jane Wyman	Gene Autry	Michael Wilding	John Mills	Ray Milland
7	Stewart Granger	Alan Ladd	Robert Mitchum	Richard Todd	James Stewart	William Boyd
8	Michael Denison	John Mills	Montgomery Clift	Alastair Sim and Margaret Rutherford (tied)	Alan Ladd	Gregory Peck
9	David Farrar	Jean Simmons	Gregory Peck	Jean Kent	Larry Parks	Robert Taylor
10	Jack Warner	Betty Grable	Gary Cooper	Trevor Howard	Robert Newton	Gene Autry

Place	1951			1952		
Place	British stars	International stars	Western stars	British stars	International stars	Western stars
1	Alec Guinness	Bob Hope	John Wayne	Ronald Shiner	Bob Hope	Gary Cooper
2	Anna Neagle	James Stewart	Alan Ladd	Alastair Sim	Gregory Peck	Randolph Scott
3	Jean Simmons	John Wayne	Randolph Scott	Alec Guinness	Betty Hutton	James Stewart
4	Michael Wilding	Abbott & Costello	Roy Rogers	Anthony Steel & Jack Hawkins (tied)	Martin and Lewis	Roy Rogers
5	Trevor Howard	Alec Guinness	James Stewart	Richard Todd	John Wayne	John Wayne
6	Alastair Sim	Anna Neagle	Joel McCrea	Nigel Patrick	Mario Lanza	Rod Cameron
7	Robert Newton	Bette Davis	Gene Autry	Jack Warner	James Mason	Alan Ladd
8	Jean Kent	Alan Ladd	Burt Lancaster	Anna Neagle	James Stewart	Gene Autry
9	Michael Redgrave	Betty Hutton	Errol Flynn	Trevor Howard	Doris Day	Jeff Chandler
10	Glynis Johns	Mario Lanza	Van Heflin	Glynis Johns	Humphrey Bogart	Clark Gable

Place	1953			1954		
Place	British stars	International stars	Western stars	British stars	International stars	Western stars
1	Jack Hawkins	Jack Hawkins	Gary Cooper	Jack Hawkins	Alan Ladd	Alan Ladd
2	Alec Guinness	Bob Hope	Randolph Scott	Dirk Bogarde	James Stewart	Audie Murphy
3	Ronald Shiner	Alan Ladd	John Wayne	Norman Wisdom	Gregory Peck	James Stewart
4	Alastair Sim	Gregory Peck	James Stewart	Glynis Johns	Martin and Lewis	John Wayne
5	Dirk Bogarde	Dean Martin & Jerry Lewis	Audie Murphy	Kenneth More	Jack Hawkins	Jeff Chandler
6	Dinah Sheridan	Bing Crosby	Roy Rogers	Alec Guinness	Danny Kaye	Randolph Scott
7	Jack Warner	John Wayne	Rock Hudson	Anthony Steel	Burt Lancaster	Rock Hudson
8	Nigel Patrick	Stewart Granger	Gene Autry	Ronald Shiner	Doris Day	Joel McCrea
9	Ralph Richardson	Doris Day	Rod Cameron	Richard Todd	Dirk Bogarde	Guy Madison
10	Anthony Steel	Danny Kaye	Rory Calhoun	John Mills	Norman Wisdom	George Montgomery

Place	1955			1956		
Place	British stars	International stars	Western stars	British star	International stars	Western stars
1	Dirk Bogarde	Dirk Bogarde	James Stewart	Kenneth More	Kenneth More	James Stewart
2	John Mills	James Stewart	Gary Cooper	Jack Hawkins	James Stewart	John Wayne
3	Norman Wisdom	Bing Crosby	Burt Lancaster	Dirk Bogarde	Burt Lancaster	Audie Murphy
4	Alastair Sim	Doris Day	Audie Murphy	Virginia McKenna	Audie Murphy	Jeff Chandler
5	Kenneth More	John Mills	Alan Ladd	Norman Wisdom	Jeff Chandler	Kirk Douglas
6	Jack Hawkins	Norman Wisdom	Randolph Scott	Anthony Steel	Doris Day	Randolph Scott
7	Richard Todd	Jeff Chandler	John Wayne	Peter Finch	Danny Kaye	Robert Mitchum
8	Michael Redgrave	Alastair Sim	Kirk Douglas	Alec Guinness	Dean Martin & Jerry Lewis	Joel McCrea
9	Diana Dors	Rock Hudson	Rory Calhoun	John Gregson	Frank Sinatra	Frank Sinatra
10	Alec Guinness	Humphrey Bogart	Jeff Chandler	John Mills	Robert Mitchum	Glenn Ford

Place	1957		1958		1959
Place	British stars	International stars	British stars	International stars	British star
1	Dirk Bogarde	Dirk Bogarde	Alec Guinness	Alec Guinness	Kenneth More
2	Kenneth More	Kenneth More	Dirk Bogarde	Dirk Bogarde	Alec Guinness
3	Peter Finch	Burt Lancaster	Kenneth More	Kenneth More	Norman Wisdom
4	John Gregson	Rock Hudson	Ian Carmichael	Kirk Douglas	Stanley Baker
5	Norman Wisdom	Peter Finch	Virginia McKenna	Frank Sinatra	Dirk Bogarde
6	John Mills	Jeff Chandler	John Mills	William Holden	Peter Sellers
7	Stanley Baker	John Gregson	Norman Wisdom	Glenn Ford	
8	Ian Carmichael	Dean Martin & Jerry Lewis	John Gregson	Ian Carmichael	
9	Jack Hawkins	Norman Wisdom	Jack Hawkins	Virginia McKenna	
10	Belinda Lee	Yul Brynner	Stanley Baker	Elvis Presley	

Place	International stars				
Place	1960	1961	1962	1963	1964
1	Kenneth More	Hayley Mills	Cliff Richard	Cliff Richard	Sean Connery
2	Peter Sellers	Sophia Loren	Elvis Presley	Peter Sellers	Peter Sellers
3	Sophia Loren	Kenneth More	Peter Sellers	Elvis Presley	Stanley Baker
4	Sir Alec Guinness	Elizabeth Taylor	Kenneth More	Sean Connery	Cary Grant
5	Elizabeth Taylor	John Mills	Hayley Mills	Hayley Mills	Audrey Hepburn
6	Audrey Hepburn	Peter Sellers	Doris Day	Elizabeth Taylor	The Beatles
7	Jack Lemmon	Audrey Hepburn	Sophia Loren	Marlon Brando	Norman Wisdom
8	Stanley Baker	Dirk Bogarde	John Wayne	Albert Finney	Cliff Richard
9	Dirk Bogarde	Jack Lemmon	Frank Sinatra	Dirk Bogarde	Kenneth Williams
10	Norman Wisdom	John Wayne	Sean Connery	Norman Wisdom	Elvis Presley

Place	International stars	
Place	1965	1966
1	Sean Connery	Sean Connery
2	Elvis Presley	Michael Caine
3	Julie Andrews	Robert Vaughn & David McCallum
4	Sophia Loren	Audrey Hepburn
5	Rex Harrison	Norman Wisdom
6	The Beatles	Rex Harrison
7	Richard Burton	Steve McQueen
8	Peter Sellers	Julie Andrews
9	Peter O'Toole	Peter Sellers
10	John Wayne	Elvis Presley
In 1965, Dirk Bogarde, Stanley Baker and Cliff Richard were in the top 25.

- In 1967, Sean Connery was voted most popular male star and Julie Christie most popular female star.

Place	International stars			
Place	1968	1969	1970	1971
1	John Wayne	Clint Eastwood	Paul Newman	Richard Burton
2	Julie Christie	Omar Sharif	Clint Eastwood	Steve McQueen
3	Steve McQueen	Michael Caine	Steve McQueen	Dustin Hoffman
4	Tommy Steele	Steve McQueen	John Wayne	Michael Caine
5	Paul Newman	John Wayne	Richard Burton	Oliver Reed
6	Sean Connery	Richard Burton	Dustin Hoffman	Glenda Jackson
7	Clint Eastwood	Sean Connery	Lee Marvin	Candice Bergen
8	Julie Andrews	Julie Andrews	Michael Caine	Clint Eastwood
9	Stanley Baker	Warren Mitchell	Richard Harris	Frankie Howerd
10	Sidney Poitier	Dustin Hoffman	Robert Redford	Jack Nicholson

- In 1972, Sean Connery was voted most popular male star, followed by Clint Eastwood and Gene Hackman.

== Top Stars in France ==
Various polls have been taken for the top stars in France too.

Place	1956–1958	1956–1990
1	Darry Cowl	Louis de Funès
2	Bernard Blier	Bourvil
3	Jean Gabin	Jean-Paul Belmondo
4	Jeanne Moreau	Jean Gabin
5	Henri Vidal	Fernandel
6	Dany Carrel	Alain Delon
7	Brigitte Bardot	Lino Ventura
8	Annie Girardot	Gérard Depardieu
9	Daniel Gélin	Jean Marais
10	Danielle Darrieux	Bernard Blier

== Box Office Poison ==
In 1938 a list was published of stars who were considered "box office poison" by exhibitors. The list was from Harry Brandt of the Independent Theater Owners Association.

The stars included:

- Edward Arnold
- Fred Astaire
- John Barrymore
- James Cagney
- Joan Crawford
- Dolores del Río
- Marlene Dietrich
- Kay Francis
- Greta Garbo
- Katharine Hepburn
- Norma Shearer
- Mae West

== Variety's Over Priced Stars of 1968 ==
In 1968 Variety magazine published a list of ten stars it considered overpriced. The stars charged at least $250,000 a film and had at least four flops in a row recently:

- Brigitte Bardot
- Marlon Brando
- Yul Brynner
- Tony Curtis
- Glenn Ford
- James Garner
- William Holden
- Rock Hudson
- Anthony Quinn
- Natalie Wood
