= Martin Quigley =

Martin Qiuigley may refer to:'

- Martin Quigley (hurler) (born 1951), Irish sportsman and professional hurler
- Martin Quigley (publisher) (1890–1964), publisher and journalist in the film industry; proponent and co-author of the Motion Picture Production Code
- Martin Quigley Jr. (1917–2011), publisher of film magazines, author and politician
- Martin Quigley, director of Arboretum of the University of Central Florida
- Martin P. Quigley, Irish member of Dundalk IRA member, allegedly part of the South Armagh Snipers in the 1990s
