= International Motion Picture Almanac =

Annual film industry almanac, 1929–2014

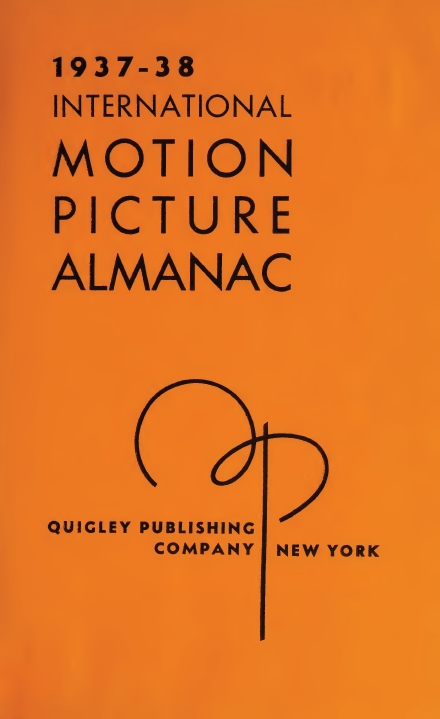
- Discipline: Motion Pictures
- Language: English

Publication details
- Former names: International motion picture almanac; Motion picture and television almanac; International motion picture almanac; Motion picture almanac
- History: 1929–2014
- Publisher: Quigley Publishing Company (United States)
- Frequency: Annual

Standard abbreviations
- ISO 4: Int. Motion Pict. Alm.

Indexing
- ISSN: 0074-7084
- LCCN: 29008663
- OCLC no.: 4652879

The International Motion Picture Almanac was an annual almanac of the motion picture industry and the people involved in it that was published by Quigley Publishing Company from 1929 until 2014.

== History ==
The almanac was first published as The Motion Picture Almanac in 1929, edited and compiled by the staff of Martin Quigley's motion picture trade journal, Exhibitors Herald-World. It became the International Motion Picture Almanac in 1936, then the Motion Picture and Television Almanac until 1956 when it was split into the International Motion Picture Almanac and International Television Almanac in 1956. It was published by the Quigley Publishing Company since inception.
