= Motography =

American film magazine, published 1909 to 1918

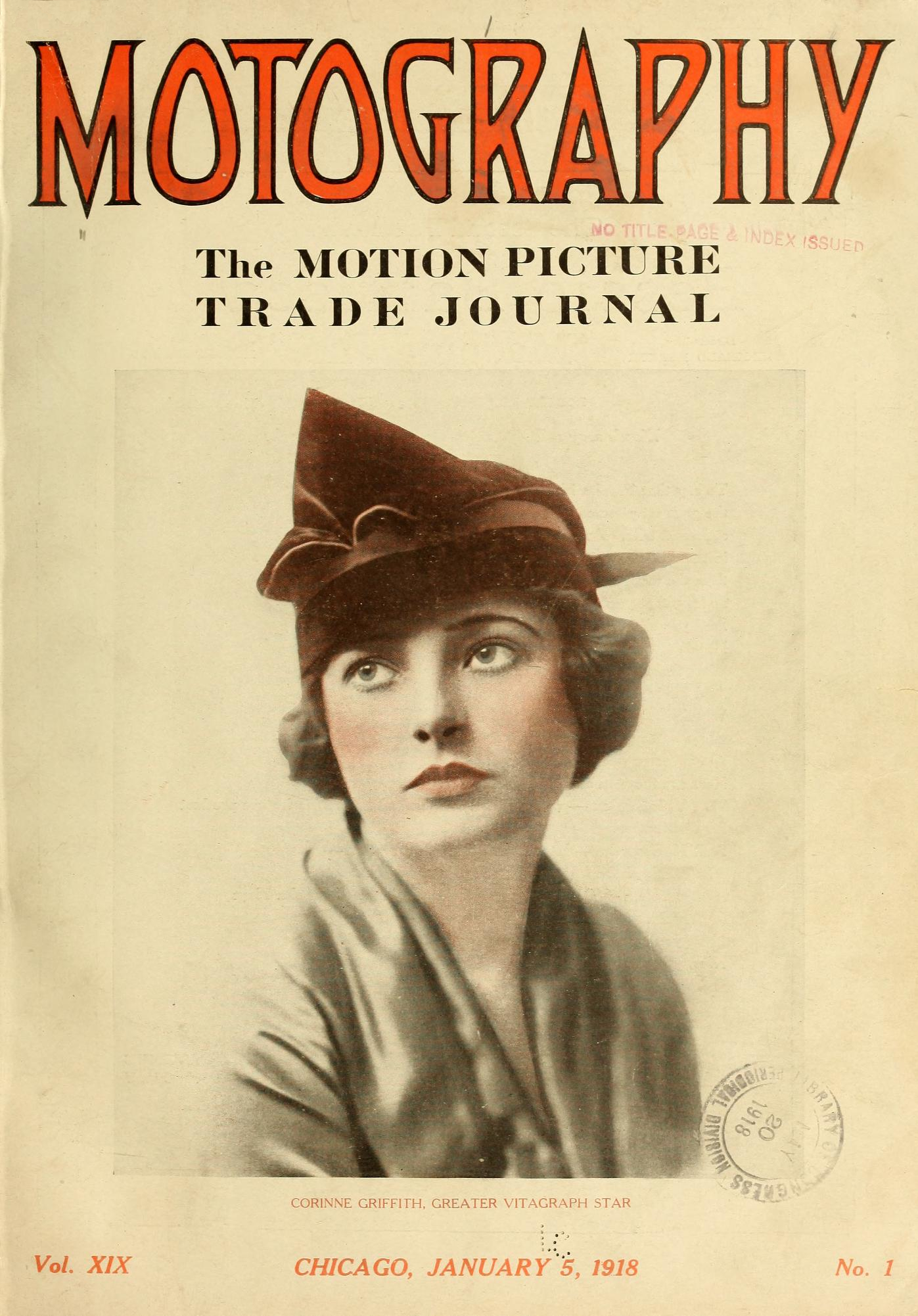
Cover featuring actress Corinne Griffith, Vol. 19, No. 1, January 5, 1918

Motography was an American film journal that was first published in 1909 and ran until mid-1918. The magazine was published in 1909 and was originally named The Nickelodeon, but then changed its name to Motography in 1911. The trade journal was published monthly by Electricity Magazine Corporation in Chicago and had a bureau office in New York City. Motography was one of the most popular American Film trade papers, and was read primarily by individuals in the film industry, such as movie directors and movie theater owners. In 1918, Martin Quigley bought Motography, merging it with what eventually became the Motion Picture Herald.

== Content ==
Motography had a variety of content that catered towards members of the film industry. The magazine often published articles on newly released movies, synopses of movies, current movie trends, and industry news. Similar to many modern film publications, Motography highlighted specific actors and their performances in their section called “Motography’s Gallery of Picture Players.” This gallery often showed four actors, alongside their photographs, featured a short biography of the actor as well as films they had recently starred in. Motography writers wrote about the lives of people in the film industry, reporting on events such as recent birthdays, anniversaries, accidents, deaths, and other major life events. Additionally, the magazine had a latest news of Chicago or New York page which they deemed “Of interest to all the trade”, which featured news about movie theater exhibitors, owners, managers, film organization coordinators, and so on. “What Theater Men are doing; news of exhibitors succeeding are you one?” which highlighted key leaders in the industry, what they had been doing, and how they had become successful. Additionally, they had a reoccurring section called “Brief Theater News for the Entire Country”, which was a summary of all relevant, film industry, current events occurring across the country.

The trade journal was also considered a guide to business trends and news in the industry. Motography would often report on recent mergers and acquisitions, industry trends, growing companies, or companies that may be declining. For instance, in their 1918 April issue in their "Publicity That Makes Profits", Motography writers wrote about new ways to advertise to people, to come to particular theaters, watch movies, etc. Moreover, in their 1918 May issue, they published an article called the “New 100,000,000 Corporation Formed?”, which discussed large production and distribution companies that had merged, in order to make one, large, centralized conglomerate. This new company was called the Associated Booking Company. The merge allowed all exchanges to be combined, reducing overhead costs, while still retaining the identity of each individual exchange. Additionally, in their April 1918 issue, they published an article called "Co-operative field Getting Too Crowded", which reported that there were too many co-operatives forming in the industry, which would result in enhanced competition between organizations, and possible fall of current co-operatives.

Not only did the magazine review movies, but they also reviewed movie studios and theaters, and would make recommendations to their readers as well as reviews on film equipment and new technological advancements in the industry. For instance, in the 1918 April issue, Writer Wesley Smith wrote about new projection equipment by Mazda, titling the article “Solution of Projection Problems.” They featured a complete record of current films, updating them on a weekly basis. This guide showed all of the current films genres, categorized as Drama, Comedy, Topical, Scenic or Educational. They would also illustrate in this section the distributor's booking number, actors featured in the film, number of reels, and so on.

== Merge with Motion Picture Herald ==
Motography, the monthly trade journal was published for a total of 9 and a half years. In 1918, Martin Quigley bought Motography merging it with another well known trade journal, Exhibitors Herald (later Motion Picture Herald).

== See also ==
- List of film periodicals

== General references ==
- Decherney, Peter (2012). Hollywood and the Culture Elite: How the Movies Became American. Columbia University Press. pp. 49–51. ISBN 9780231508513.
