= Pigs (play) =

1924 play

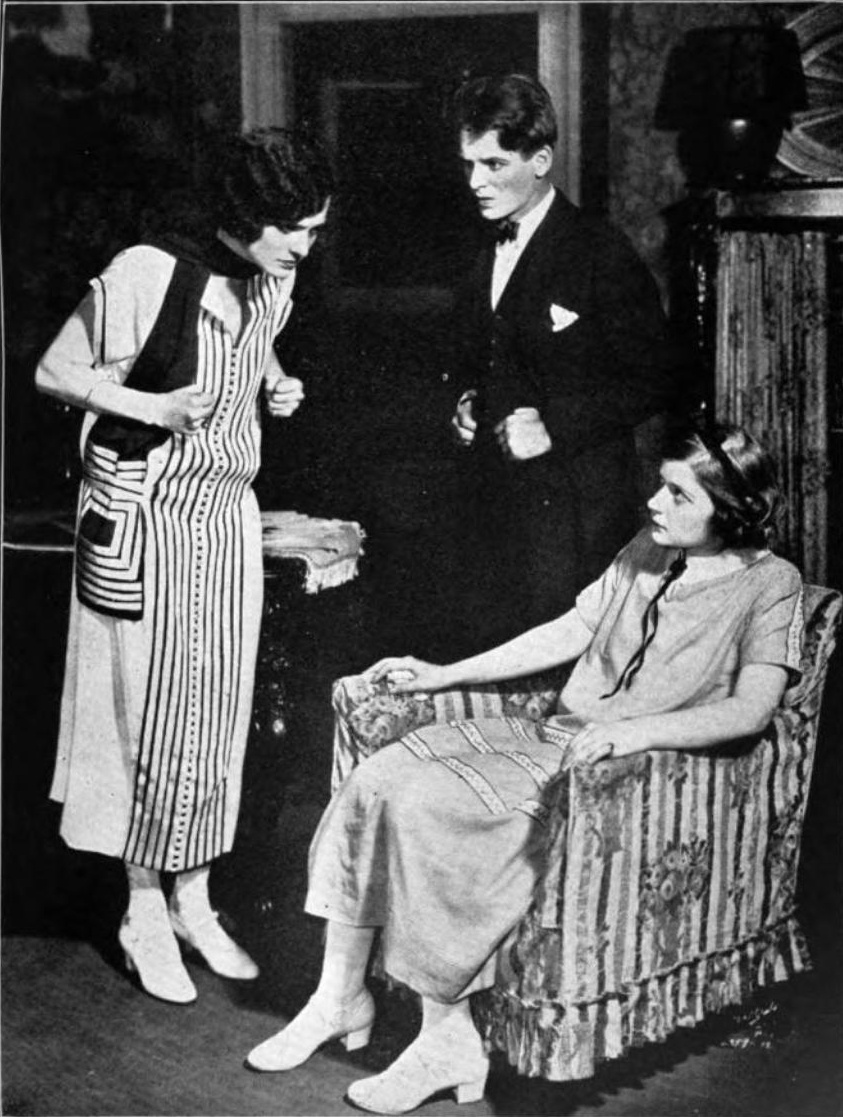
- Rosemary Hilton, Wallace Ford and Nydia Westman in Act II
- Original language: English
- Written by: Anne Morrison and Patterson McNutt
- Subject: Young couple raise money to save family home
- Genre: Comedy
- Setting: The Atkins' living room and Hendricks farm

Premiere
- Date: September 1, 1924
- Place: Little Theatre
- Directed by: Frank Craven

Pigs is a 1924 play written by Anne Morrison and Patterson McNutt. It is a three-act comedy with four scenes. It has a medium-sized cast, two settings, and fast pacing. The story concerns a young man who senses a great business opportunity in some ailing pigs. With the help of a young woman and his mother, he demonstrates his veterinary skills and saves the family home.

It was first produced by John Golden and staged by Frank Craven, and starred Wallace Ford and Nydia Westman. It ran on Broadway from September 1924 thru June 1925. The production then started touring in October 1925.

== Characters ==
Listed in order of appearance within their scope.
Leads

- Thomas Atkins Jr. called "Junior", is 18, strongly built, a high school graduate and would-be veterinarian.
- Mildred Cushing is 17, Junior's self-appointed fiancé, who uses her eavesdropping skills to benefit him.

Supporting

- Thomas Atkins Sr. called "Senior", is a small-town attorney whose practice is not doing well.
- Hector Spencer is Senior's brother-in-law, age 30, unemployed, shifty, lazy and a cad.
- Grandma Spencer is Senior's widowed mother-in-law; fussy, querulous, a gossip, who dotes on her son Hector.
- Ellen Atkins is Senior's wife, age 42, an intelligent, discreet, and considerate person.
- Spencer Atkins is Senior's older son, age 23, just graduated Harvard Law School but wants to write poetry.
- Lenore Hastings is Mildred's beautiful cousin, age 21, a social butterfly whom Mildred has the goods on.

Featured

- Smith Hastings is Lenore's father and Mildred's uncle. He is age 55 and prosperous.
- Dr. Springer is a large-animal veterinarian, a friend of Junior.

Off stage

- Tillie Hendricks is a compromised young lady with a baby, whom Grandma Spencer paid $2000 to stay away.

== Synopsis ==
The play is set in the fictional town of Medbury, Indiana, near the Illinois state line.

Act I (Atkins living room) Senior is upset with Junior's pleas to borrow $250 to buy 250 cholera-infected pigs. Senior's finances are precarious; his mother-in-law borrowed $2000 from him and he has no ready cash. There is also a note coming due on the mortgage. Junior is convinced he can cure the pigs and resell them for a large profit. Grandma Spencer and Hector are in the living room when Ellen returns from visiting a bereaved neighbor. Grandma Spencer is incensed, claiming the recently deceased still owed her own dead husband $16. Ellen gently refutes her; the neighbor showed a ledger wherein the money had been paid to Hector. The latter quickly leaves for a trip downtown. Junior departs to return a healed goat to a neighbor.

Later, Mildred explains to Senior that Junior and her are engaged and need the profits from the pig deal to get married. Spencer Atkins enters, dressed in Junior's only good suit for a party. He's surprised to learn Junior and Mildred are coming as well, and quickly departs. When Junior returns, Mildred tells him about the note for the mortgage, which she overheard her uncle discuss. Junior hurries upstairs to put on a suit that is no longer there. When Hector returns, Mildred innocently asks if he's feeling better now. Suspicious, he deduces Junior has secretly given him something. His yells of "Poison!" bring everyone else. Junior confesses he gave Hector a store-bought tonic to perk him up so he could go find work. Junior is angry with Mildred and breaks the engagement. (Curtain)

Act II (Same setting, about 2pm the next day) Mildred and Junior reconcile while considering how $250 might be had. Smith Hastings comes by to talk with Senior, reminds him of the note coming due and rejects any delay. On his way out Mildred hits up her uncle for the cash, but he declines. Lenore comes by in her car, and Mildred tries to put the screws to her, on the basis of past indiscretions. Mildred coyly mentions to Hector that Tillie Hendricks was in town, holding a baby. He panics and runs out calling for his mother. Junior is in despair until Ellen twists her engagement ring off, and hands it to him. Use this, she urges, its worth more than $250. (Curtain)

Act III (Scene 1: Hendrick's farm about 4am the next morning) Dr. Springer and Mildred are readying buckets of slop mixed with Junior's tonic. They can't see how many pigs are still alive until dawn comes. Junior rushes in with more tonic. He had to dodge an auto with Spencer and Lenore, who are out looking for them. The auto pulls into the farmyard; Junior and Mildred hide, while Dr. Springer deals with the searchers. After they leave, Junior and Mildred come out as Dr. Springer fills the pig troughs with the slop. The pigs come running and eat, delighting all three of them.

(Scene 2: Atkins living room about 8pm same day) Everyone has been in an uproar about the missing couple. Junior and Mildred explain they got married over the state line, with Dr. Springer and Tillie Hendricks as witnesses. The buyer of the pigs gave Junior a certified check for $2400, which he endorses over to Senior. Tillie phones, and Mildred pressures Hector to talk with and later go see her. Junior asks for some of the money back when the check is cashed, so he can redeem his mother's ring. Grandma Spencer is left alone, muttering "Pigs!". (Curtain)

== Original production ==
=== Background ===
Author Anne Morrison was an actress who had written one previous play, while Patterson McNutt was a sportswriter at the New York World, the younger brother of William Slavens McNutt. Their first version of the play, copyright 1923 to both authors, was called Johnny Jones, Jr.. The second version, copyright 1924 to John Golden and the authors, was titled Pigs.

=== Cast ===
Cast for the tryouts in Elmira, Atlantic City, Stamford, Asbury Park and during the original Broadway run. The production was on hiatus from June 8 through August 21, 1924.
Role	Actor	Dates	Notes and sources
Thomas Atkins Jr. (Note: This character was called Johnny Jones, Jr during the first two tryouts.)	Wallace Ford	May 30, 1924 - Jun 23, 1925	Among Ford's previous roles was a stint as Abie in the original production of Abie's Irish Rose.
Mildred Cushing	Nydia Westman	May 30, 1924 - Jun 23, 1925	This was Westman's first Broadway role; she had been with Golden's touring companies.
Thomas Atkins Sr. (Note: This character was called John Jones, Sr during the first two tryouts.)	Richard Carlyle	May 30, 1924 - Jun 07, 1924	
Thomas Atkins Sr.	George Henry Trader	Aug 22, 1924 - Jun 23, 1925	
Hector Spencer	Phillip Barrison	May 30, 1924 - Jun 23, 1925	
Grandma Spencer	Maude Granger	May 30, 1924 - Jun 23, 1925	
Spencer Atkins (Note: This character was called Spencer Jones during the first two tryouts.)	Robert Keith	May 30, 1924 - Jun 07, 1924	
Spencer Atkins	Alan Bunce	Aug 22, 1924 - Jun 23, 1925	
Ellen Atkins (Note: This character was called Ellen Jones during the first two tryouts.)	Jane Ellison	May 30, 1924 - Jun 07, 1924	
Ellen Atkins	May Buckley	Aug 22, 1924 - Jun 23, 1925	
Lenore Hastings	Rosemary Hilton	May 30, 1924 - Jun 23, 1925	She was a younger sister of hotel magnate Conrad Hilton.
Smith Hastings	James Kearney	May 30, 1924 - Dec 13, 1924	
Smith Hastings	William Cox	Dec 15, 1924 - Jun 23, 1925	
Dr. Springer (Note: This character was created during the hiatus between the second and third tryouts.)	John Francis	Aug 22, 1924 - Aug 30, 1924	
Dr. Springer	Frederick Malcolm	Sep 01, 1924 - Jun 23, 1925	

=== Tryouts ===
Pigs was first given a tryout at the Lyceum Theatre in Elmira, New York on May 30, 1924. Though the title had changed from Johnny Jones, Jr., the main character still bore that name, as did members of his family. The local reviewer was enthusiastic about the presence of John Golden at the debut, and predicted a long run in New York.

After a few performances in Elmira, the production moved to the Apollo Theatre in Atlantic City, New Jersey, opening on June 2, 1924. Here the local critic was more forthcoming about the plot, inadvertently revealing some differences with the later version of the play. One difference was Grandma Spender had borrowed the money from Smith Hastings, rather than her son-in-law. Another was that all three acts were described as having the same setting, nor was there any mention of Dr. Springer.

The third tryout for Pigs was held in Stamford, Connecticut on August 22, 1924. The production then moved to the Savoy Theatre in Asbury Park, New Jersey, where it opened on August 25, 1924. A local review shows the play had assumed its final form: Dr. Springer was now in the cast list, the Jones family was renamed to Atkins, Grandma Spencer borrowed the $2000 from Thomas Atkins Sr, and the presence of real pigs on the stage showed the Hendricks farm scene had been added.

=== Premiere and reception ===
After a week in New Jersey, Pigs had its Broadway premiere on September 1, 1924, at the Little Theatre. The reviewer for the Brooklyn Daily Eagle said the plot was not original, but worked through a sense of fun created by the two leads, Wallace Ford and Nydia Westman. The Brooklyn Times-Union reviewer thought overall the play was pleasing despite some weakness in Philip Barrison's acting, but felt cutting a minute from the ending would be beneficial. Burns Mantle at the New York Daily News was enthusiastic only about Nydia Westman's performance. He thought the story was weak, despite director Frank Craven's attempt to punch it up with comic touches, and that only Wallace Ford in the cast offered much support to Nydia Westman.

The Brooklyn Citizen critic was more generous, heaping praise on Wallace Ford, Maude Granger, and May Buckley, but agreed with Burns Mantle that Nydia Westman was the most important part of the play. The Brooklyn Standard Union also praised Nydia Westman, thought Wallace Ford and Alan Bunce were good, but felt Maude Granger had overacted.

=== Closing ===
The play closed on June 23, 1925, after 348 performances.
