= Maude Granger =

American actress

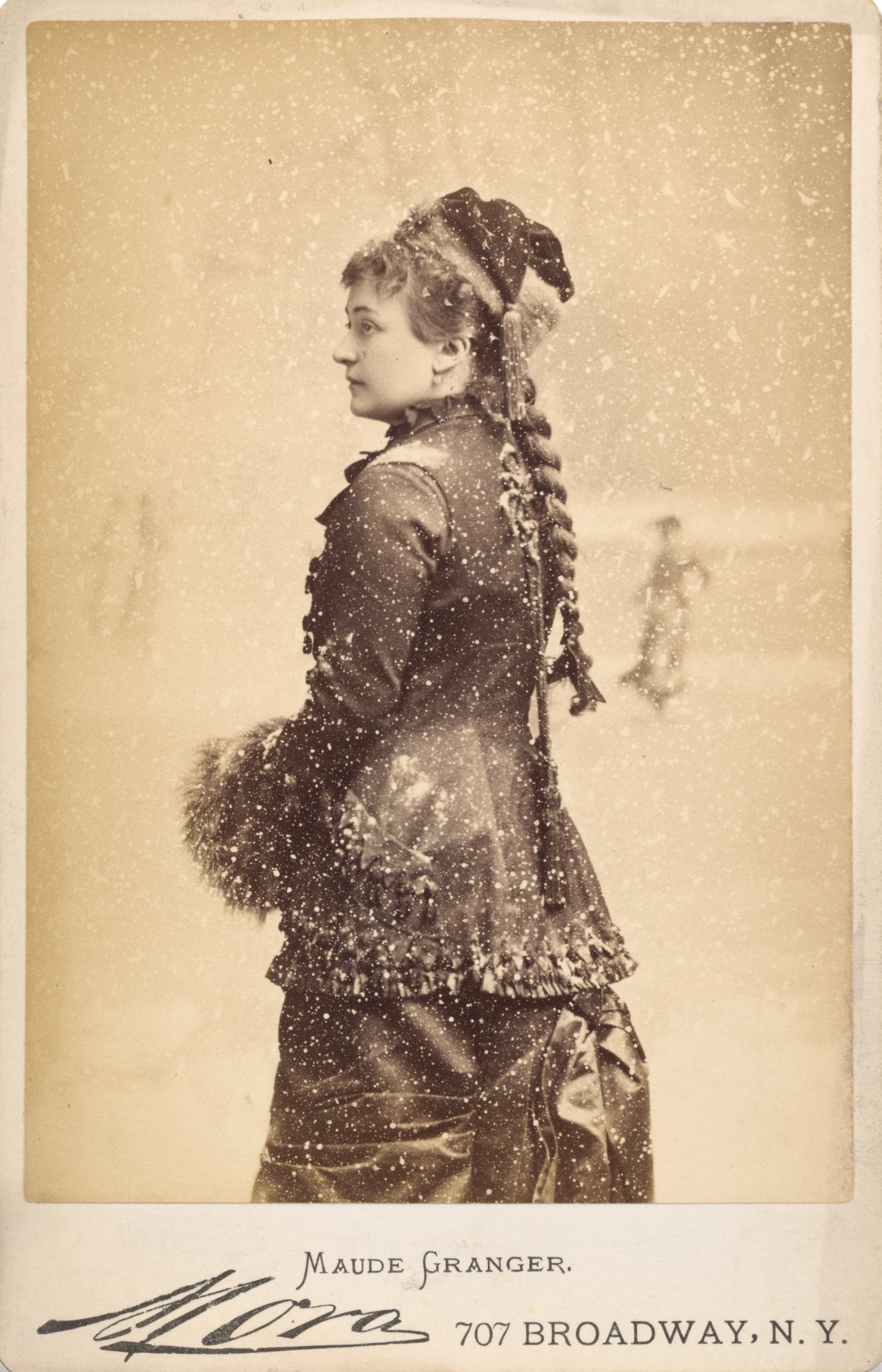
- Granger in 1880s
- Born: Anna Brainard; 1849; Middletown, Connecticut
- Died: August 17, 1928 (aged 78–79); New York City
- Occupation: Actress
- Years active: 1870s-1920s

Maude Granger (1849-August 17, 1928) was a popular American stage actress of the latter part of the 19th century, and early 20th century.

== Biography ==
Granger was born Anna Brainard in Middletown, Connecticut. She made her Broadway debut in A Woman's Heart at the Union Square Theatre. She took over the lead part in Led Astray when Rose Eytinge became ill. She also appeared in The Two Orphans, Two Nights in Rome, The Planter's Wife, Broken Hearts, and My Partner. Later she took on more Shakespearean roles, and also appeared in more Broadway hits such as The First Year (1920) and Pigs (1924). While playing in Pigs in Chicago she fell ill, and had to retire after failing to fully recover from surgery. She retired after a 55-year stage career.

Historian David S. Shields has written that Granger competed with Clara Morris for "the title of the most gripping actress of the American stage during the third quarter of the 19th century." Her talent led many New York theatre managers to vie for her, with associations with Augustin Daly, Lester Wallack, and the Union Square company. She also "had a particular interest in elevating the anguish of contemporary women to the status of classical tragedy".

In 1885, the book New National Theater, Washington DC: A record of Fifty Years by Alexander Hunter said of Granger: " The statuesque Maude made by far the most beautiful Mlle. Gautier that the audience had ever seen, for she had a figure that Rubens would have loved to paint — a Byron describe — large, full, sensuous. On a pose in a tableau Miss Granger was a success, but as an actress in such a character as “Camille" she was an insolvent in the dramatic bank, and more people went to see her out of curiosity than with a desire to be entertained."

== Personal ==
Though late 19th century newspapers report other marriages, her obituaries simply noted that Granger married Alfred Calmer of Chicago in 1888, and that he soon after died and she never remarried.

== Films ==
- The Runaway Wife (1915)*short
- The White Pearl (1915)
- Zaza (1915)
- The Slave Auction (1918)
