= Motion Picture Daily =

American daily film magazine

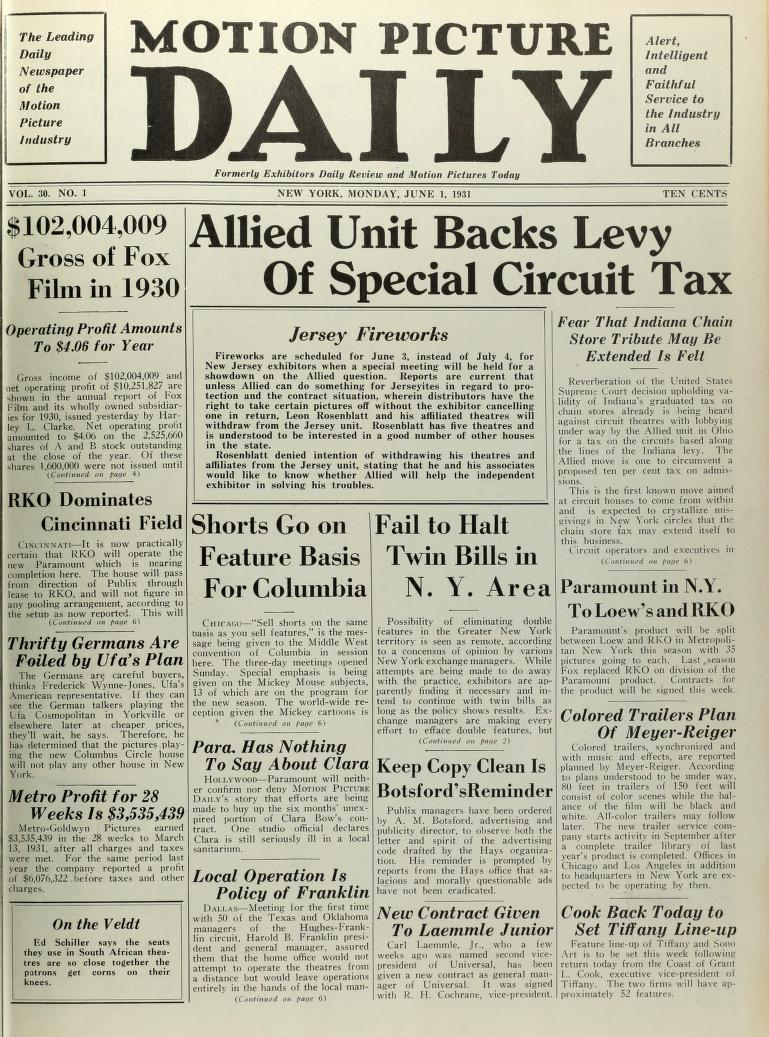
- Front page from the premiere issue, June 1, 1931
- Categories: Film
- First issue: April 4, 1931
- Final issue: 1972
- Country: United States
- Language: English

Motion Picture Daily was an American daily magazine focusing on the film industry. It was published by Quigley Publishing Company, which also published the Motion Picture Herald. The magazine was formed by the merging of three existing Quigley publications: Exhibitors Trade Review, Exhibitors Daily Review, and Motion Pictures Today. The first issue was published in April 1931. The magazine was in circulation until 1972.

== History ==
Martin Quigley had obtained several magazines during the 1910s and 1920s. In 1931, he began merging them into two magazines. The first four merged in late 1930 and became the Motion Picture Herald, which began publication on April 4, 1931. Quigley followed this shortly after with the merger of his remaining three publications, Exhibitors Trade Review, Exhibitors Daily Review, and Motion Pictures Today to form Motion Picture Daily. Its premiere issue hit the newsstands on Monday, June 1, 1931.

It was a direct competitor with The Film Daily, with a circulation between 5,000 and 8,000 per day. Because it was centered in New York City, where most of the studios maintained their headquarters, it focused more on economic, production and regulatory issues. While the magazine's emphasis was on breaking news, it also reviewed each new film as it was released, and printed cast and crew lists. One of the major features of the magazine during the 1930s was "Box Office Check Up," which reported on film rentals. Maurice Kann, nicknamed "Red", was the magazine's original editor.

== See also ==
- List of film periodicals
