= Martin Quigley Jr. =

American magazine publisher and editor

- Born: Martin Schofield Quigley, Jr. November 24, 1917; Chicago, Illinois, U.S.
- Died: February 5, 2011 (aged 93); West Hartford, Connecticut, U.S.
- Citizenship: United States
- Education: Georgetown University; Columbia University
- Occupations: Publisher; politician; author; spy.
- Spouse: Katherine Dunphy (1946–2011, survives him)
- Writing career
- Subject: motion picture business

Martin Quigley Jr. (November 24, 1917 – February 5, 2011) was a publisher of film magazines, an author and a politician twice elected mayor of Larchmont, New York.

== Journalism and publishing ==
He was the son of Martin Quigley (1890–1964). His father had been a founder of developer of motion picture trade periodicals including the Motion Picture Herald and an active proponent and co-author of the Motion Picture Production Code, which governed the content of Hollywood movies from the 1930s to the 1960s.

The younger Quigley became very active in the editing and publication of those periodicals from young adulthood, also attempting to maintain the influence of the Code, especially in the 1960s, as it faded into irrelevance as moral standards changed.

== Espionage ==
During World War II, he used his publishing position as a cover to gather intelligence in Ireland, which remained neutral during the Second World War, and in Italy, on behalf of the US Office of Strategic Services (OSS).

== Authorship ==
Books written or cowritten by him include these:

- Magic Shadows - The History of the Origin of Motion Pictures (1948) ISBN 978-1258368210
- Catholic Action in Practice: Family, Life, Education, International Life (1963, co-written with Msgr. Edward M. Connors)
- Peace Without Hiroshima (1991) ISBN 978-0819180568
- A U.S. Spy in Ireland (1999) ISBN 978-1570984105

== Personal life ==
His father was an important publisher of film magazines. He was a devout Catholic and active in Church activities. He was twice elected mayor of Larchmont, New York.
