= May Buckley =

American actress (1875 – c. 1941)

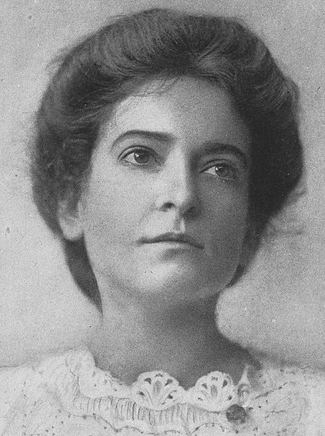
- May Buckley, from a 1907 publication
- Born: Marie Uhl; December 15, 1875; San Francisco, California, U.S.
- Died: c. 1941
- Occupation: Actress

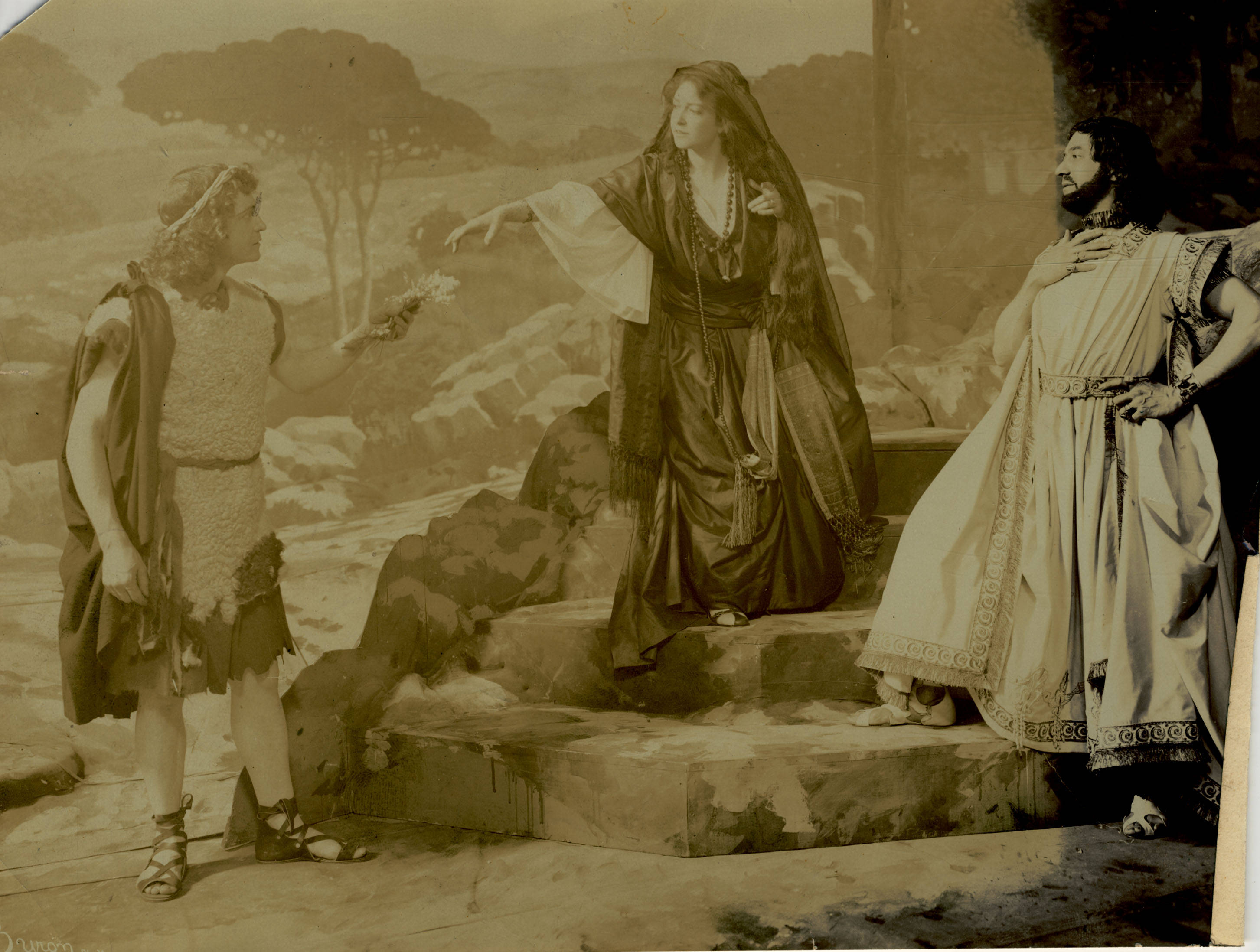
l to r: Wright Lorimer, May Buckley and Edmund Breese in The Shepherd King

May Buckley (née Uhl; December 15, 1875 – c. 1941) was an American actress on stage from childhood into the late 1930s, and in silent films in 1912–1913. Her private life was often in newspaper headlines, especially in 1901, when a man who claimed to be her husband shot at her in a hotel dining room, wounding one of her dining companions.

== Early life ==
Marie Uhl was born in San Francisco, California, "of a theatrical family", daughter of Ernest Uhl and Marie Featherston Uhl. Her mother died during Marie's birth. Her father's friend, actor and playwright Dion Boucicault, gave her the stage name "May Buckley" when she was a child actor.

== Career ==
May Buckley was active on the Broadway stage, with roles in Hearts are Trumps (1900), Caleb West (1900), The Price of Peace (1901), A Japanese Nightingale (1903), The Shepherd King (1904), The Galloper (1906), The Right of Way (1907), Cameo Kirby (1909–1910), Where There's a Will (1910), The Little Damozel (1910), The Unwritten Law (1913), Pigs (1924–1925), These Days (1928), Tell Me Pretty Maiden (1937–1938). She also appeared on the London stage.

Buckley appeared in more than twenty short silent films in 1912 and 1913, including Paid in His Own, The Poor Relation, In Dis-a-Countree, Betty and the Doctor, Mother Love, His Wife's Mother, Rice and Old Shoes, Hello, Central!, The Sacrifice, A Complicated Campaign, Won by Waiting, The Railroad Engineer, Darby and Joan, The Honeymooners, A Modern Portia, The Runaways, What the Driver Saw, The Back Window, The Derelict's Return, Until We Three Meet Again, The Man in the Street, The Toils of Deception, and Miss 'Arabian Nights'.

During World War I she was one of the organizers of the Stage Women's War Relief Association, holding benefits to raise funds for a disabled soldiers' home. In the 1920s and 1930s she was active in the Catholic Actors' Guild.

== Personal life ==
Buckley's first husband was Frank Baruch, also known as Frank Clayton or Frank Cormier; they married in 1894 and divorced in 1897. In 1899, against her contract under manager Charles Frohman, she married millionaire Wilmot H. Garlick. They separated the following year. She was possibly married to Robert Hayden Moulton, before he shot at her and wounded one of her dining companions in New York in 1901.

In 1908 she married fellow actor Charles Walter Martin-Sabine, also known as Charles W. S. Martin, in Denver. At the time of her marriage Buckley was appearing at the Elitch Theatre and the owner, Mary Elitch Long shared the event in her biography: "Walter Bellows led the beautiful bride to the altar of roses on the porch of my bungalow, where waited Mr. Walter Sabine...the man of her choice." They divorced in 1910.

In 1912, Buckley was sued by another actress (stage name of Camille Personi) for alienation of affections, concerning her co-star, actor John Halliday. "'May Buckley has broken up my home and ruined my life,' Mrs. Halliday said, 'and I am determined that she shall suffer.'"

== Unknown death date ==
The only known source of her death is the 2001 book Silent Film Necrology, which states she died in or about 1941.

== Short films ==
- Paid in His Own Coin (1912)
- The Poor Relation (1912)
- In Dis-a-Countree (1912)
- Betty and the Doctor (1912)
- Mother Love (1912)
- His Wife's Mother (1912)
- Rice and Old Shoes (1912)
- The Sacrifice (1912)
- A Complicated Campaign (1912)
- Won by Waiting (1912)
- The Railroad Engineer (1912)
- Darby and Joan (1912)
- The Honeymooners (1912)
- A Modern Portia (1912)
- The Runaways (1912)
- What the Driver Saw (1912)
- The Back Window (1912)
- The Derelict's Return (1912)
- Until We Three Meet Again (1913)
- the Man in the Street (1913)
- The Toils of Deception (1913)
- Miss 'Arabian Nights' (1913)
