= International Television & Video Almanac =

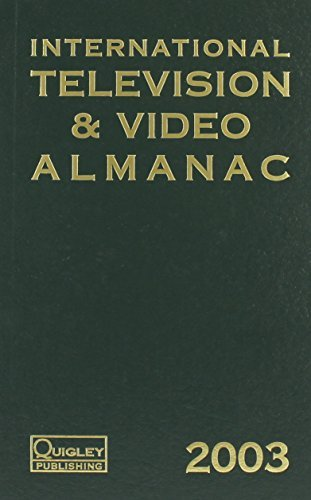
- Discipline: Television Broadcasting
- Language: English

Publication details
- Former name: International Television Almanac
- History: 1956–2014
- Publisher: Quigley Publishing Company (United States)
- Frequency: Annual

Standard abbreviations
- ISO 4: Int. Telev. Video Alm.

Indexing
- ISSN: 0539-0761
- LCCN: 87644123
- OCLC no.: 15175861

The International Television & Video Almanac was an annual almanac of the television and video industry that was published from 1956 until 2014.

== History ==
The almanac was first published as International Television Almanac (ISSN: 0539-0761) in 1956 after being separated from the Motion Picture and Television Almanac. In 1987, it acquired the title International Television & Video Almanac. It was published by the Quigley Publishing Company since inception.
