= Motion Picture Herald =

American magazine

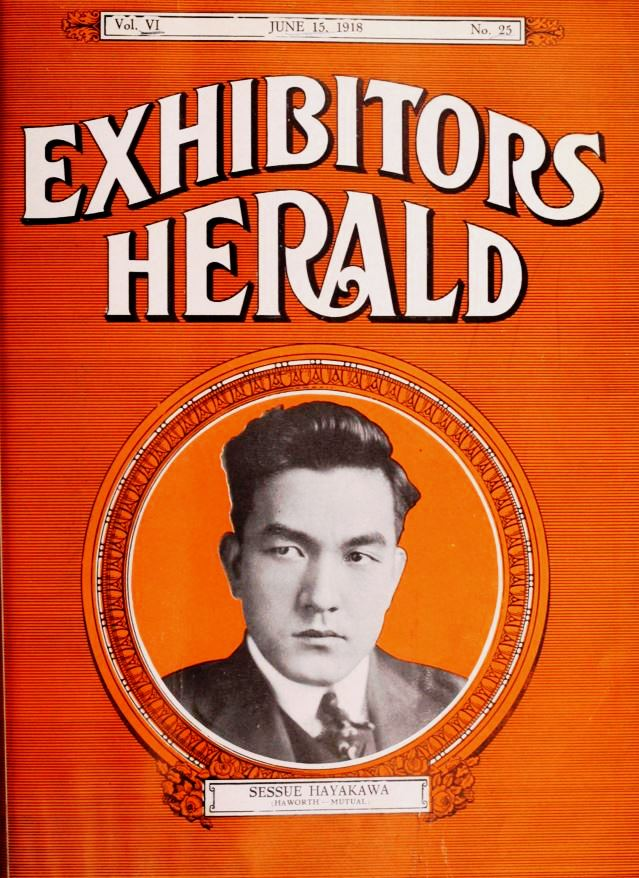
- Actor Sessue Hayakawa on the cover of the June 15, 1918 Exhibitors Herald
- Editor-in-Chief: Martin Quigley
- Categories: Trade, entertainment
- Frequency: Weekly
- Publisher: Martin Quigley
- Founder: Martin Quigley
- Founded: January 1915 (as Exhibitors Herald)
- First issue: January 1917
- Final issue: December 1972; 53 years ago
- Company: Quigley Publishing
- Country: United States
- Based in: New York City
- Language: English
- ISSN: 0027-1616
- OCLC: 7094766

The Motion Picture Herald was an American film industry trade paper first published as the Exhibitors Herald in 1915, and Motion Picture Herald from January 1931–December 1972. It was replaced by the QP Herald, which only lasted until May 1973.

== History ==
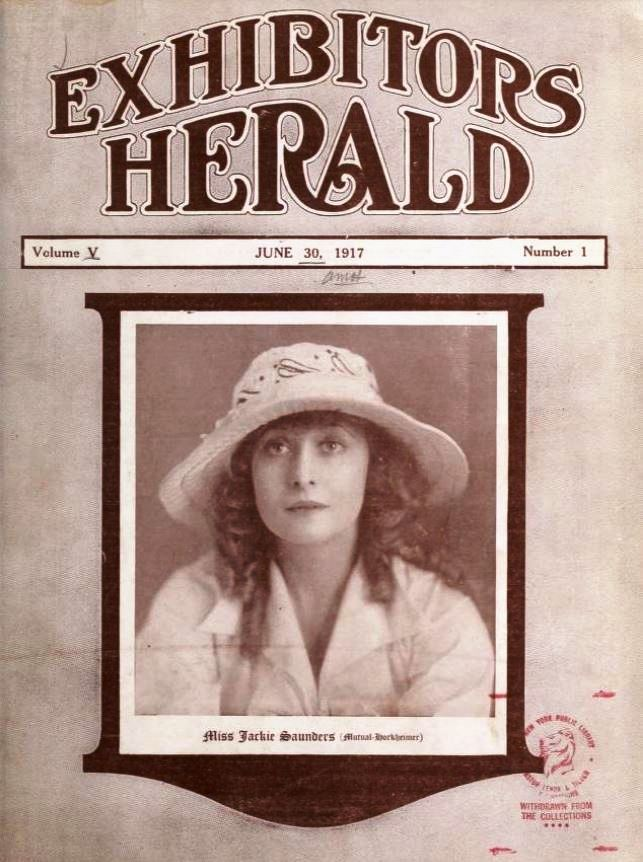
June 1917 cover of Exhibitors Herald featuring actress Jackie Saunders

The paper's origin was in 1915, when a Chicago printing company launched the Exhibitors Herald as a regional trade paper for film exhibitors in the Midwest. Publisher Martin Quigley bought the paper and, over the following two decades, developed the Exhibitors Herald into a national trade paper for the US film industry.

In 1917, Quigley acquired and merged another publication, Motography, into his magazine. In January 1928, he merged it again with The Moving Picture World magazine to become the Exhibitors Herald and Moving Picture World, and then Exhibitors Herald-World throughout 1929–1930. The combined magazine also incorporated The Film Index, founded in 1909. In 1931, Quigley merged the newly acquired Motion Picture News into the magazine, finally titling it the Motion Picture Herald.

Vincent Canby briefly wrote for the Herald during his early career.

== Description ==
The magazine had a What The Picture Did For Me section where film exhibitors shared their reviews of the latest pictures.

== See also ==
- Variety
- Motion Picture Daily
- The Hollywood Reporter
- International Television & Video Almanac
- List of film periodicals
