= Martin Quigley (publisher) =

American journalist

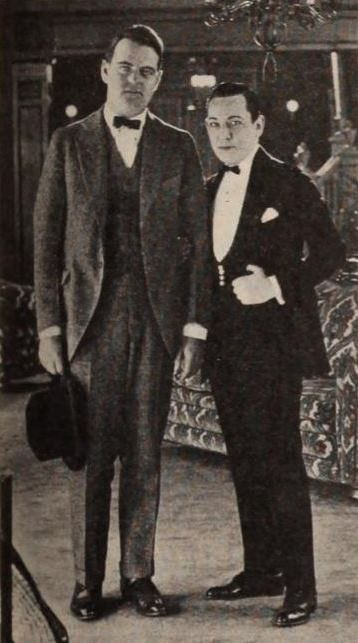
Martin Quigley (left) and actor Carter DeHaven in 1920

Martin Joseph Quigley Sr. (May 6, 1890 – May 4, 1964) was an American publisher, editor, and film magazine journalist. He founded Exhibitors Herald, which became a prominent national trade paper for the film industry. Quigley was also the founder of Quigley Publishing.

== Early life ==
Martin Joseph Quigley Sr. was born in Cleveland, Ohio,

== Publishing and journalism career ==
Martin Quigley began his career as a police reporter in Chicago in 1910.

In 1915, he purchased the film trade journal Exhibitors Herald. Two years later, he acquired and merged it with Motography. In 1927, Quigley acquired The Moving Picture World and combined it with Exhibitors Herald, publishing it as Exhibitors Herald and Moving Picture World, which was later shortened to Exhibitors Herald World.

" In 1930, Martin Quigley, publisher of Exhibitors Herald, conspired with Hollywood studios to eliminate all competing trade papers,..."

In 1930, he acquired Motion Picture News and merged it with his existing publications to create the Motion Picture Herald.

Shortly after, Quigley merged his remaining three publications — Exhibitors Trade Review, Exhibitors Daily Review, and Motion Pictures Today — to form Motion Picture Daily.

In 1929, the first edition of The Motion Picture Almanac was published and subsequently became an annual publication.

== Quigley Publishing ==
Quigley Publishing Co., started in 1915 by Martin Joseph Quigley Sr., was later run by his son, Martin Quigley Jr. until 2001. In 2005, William Quigley, a grandson of Martin Joseph Quigley Sr., was running Quigley Publishing Co.

== Role in Motion Picture Production Code ==
Quigley was an active proponent and co-author of the Motion Picture Production Code, which governed the content of Hollywood movies from the 1930s to the 1960s. A devout Catholic, he began lobbying in the 1920s for a more comprehensive code that not only listed material deemed inappropriate for movies but also established a moral framework that films could help promote — specifically, a system based on Catholic theology.

To achieve this, Quigley recruited Father Daniel A. Lord, a Jesuit priest and instructor at Saint Louis University, to draft the code. On March 31, 1930, the board of directors of the Motion Picture Producers and Distributors Association formally adopted it. While the original version was popularly known as the Hays Code, both it and its later revisions are now more commonly referred to as the Production Code.

== Personal life and death ==
Quigley held staunch conservative views, particularly regarding the film industry. His son, Martin Quigley Jr., who shared his father's views, became involved in editing and publishing the various periodicals established by Quigley Sr. However, he had far less influence due to changing cultural norms and the decline of the Production Code.

Quigley Sr. died at Saint Vincent's Catholic Medical Center in Manhattan on May 4, 1964, two days before his 74th birthday.
