= Halpin =

Halpin is an Irish surname. It is an Anglicized form of the Gaelic patronymic Ó hAlpín, meaning 'descendant of Alpin'. Other Anglicized versions of the surname include Halfpenny and Halpenny, and these variants were often used interchangeably prior to widespread literacy in Ireland. For example, the registers of St. Peter's Roman Catholic Church, Drogheda in County Louth record the variations Halpin, Halfpenny, and Halpenny used throughout the 18th and 19th centuries for demonstrably related individuals.

Notable people with the surname include:

- Anita Halpin (born 1944), British politician
- Ann Halpin (1939–2009), Australian religious sister and community leader
- Charles Aimé Halpin (1930–1994), Canadian Catholic prelate
- Charles G. Halpine (1829–1868), Irish journalist, author and soldier during the American Civil War
- David Halpin (born 1960), British respiratory scientist and clinician
- Gary Halpin (1966–2021), Irish rugby union player and hammer thrower
- George Halpin (1770s–1854), Irish civil engineer and lighthouse builder
- Gerald Halpin (1896–1944), Australian cyclist
- Hal Halpin (born 1959), American computer game executive & entrepreneur
- James Halpin (1843–1909), Irish farmer, building contractor and politician
- Jim Halpin (1863–1893), English baseball player
- John Halpin (born 1961), Scottish football player
- Kathleen Halpin (1903–1999), British civil servant and feminist
- Luke Halpin (born 1947), American actor
- Marjorie Halpin (1937–2000), American-Canadian anthropologist
- Michael Halpin (born 1978/79), American politician from Illinois
- Nicholas John Halpin (1790–1850), Irish Anglican cleric and writer
- Ollie Halpin (1920–1990), Irish Gaelic footballer and amateur actor
- Patrick G. Halpin (born 1953), American executive and talk show host
- Petey Halpin (born 2002), American baseball player
- Robert Halpin (1836–1894), Irish sea captain
- Ronald Halpin, Canadian public servant and diplomat
- Roy Halpin (born 1955), Canadian ice hockey player
- Saul Halpin (born 1991), English footballer
- Scot Halpin (1954–2008), American drummer
- Terry Halpin (born 1950s), Australian professor
- Thomas Halpin (disambiguation), various people
- Trish Halpin (born c. 1967), British magazine editor
- Troy Halpin (born 1973), Australian football player

== See also ==
- Halpin-Tsai model
- Suzanne Halpin, fictional character from Fair City
- Halpen
