= Henry Morford =

American writer and newspaperman (1823–1881)

- Born: March 10, 1823; Chanceville, New Jersey, U.S.
- Died: August 4, 1881 (aged 58); Brooklyn, New York, U.S.
- Occupations: Poet; novelist; playwright; travel writer; magazine editor; newspaper owner

Henry Morford (March 10, 1823 – August 4, 1881) was an American writer, editor, and newspaperman. Originally a local businessman and postmaster of his native New Monmouth, New Jersey, he wrote poetry while on break from work and published three poetry volumes: The Rest of Don Juan (1846), The Rhymes of Twenty Years (1859), and Rhymes of an Editor (1873). He wrote several novels, plays, and travel books, including a sequel to Charles Dickens's The Mystery of Edwin Drood. He owned the Democratic Banner and New Jersey Standard (founding the latter), and was editor of the New York Leader, Morford's Magazine, and Brooklyn New Monthly Magazine.

== Biography ==
=== Early life and career ===
Morford was born on March 10, 1823, in Chanceville, a community located in the present-day New Monmouth section of Middletown Township, New Jersey. His parents were Elizabeth Willett and William Morford, the latter of whom once started out as a farmer before running one of only two stores in New Monmouth. Morford's family, of English descent, worked in the agricultural, coal, lumber and mercantile industries. Educated at New Monmouth's village school, he worked at his father's business and as New Monmouth's postmaster.

=== Writing career ===
Becoming interested in creative writing sometime before the late-1830s, Morford wrote poetry while on break from work, and published his work in the Columbian Magazine, The Knickerbocker, The New Yorker, and The Saturday Evening Post, as well as in local Monmouth County newspapers. In 1846, he published "An Hour in the Old Playground", a New-York Mirror poem which the Monmouth Democrat said was "his first poem to attract general attention" and was praised by Nathaniel Parker Willis, as well as The Rest of Don Juan, a 645-stanza unofficial sequel to the Lord Byron poem Don Juan. He later published two poetry volumes, The Rhymes of Twenty Years (1859) and Rhymes of an Editor (1873); Daniel Webster Hollis said that both volumes "showed a mastery of the poetic form yet lacked any distinctive originality," and The New York Times remarked that they "contain much meritorious verse."

In the early 1850s, Morford purchased the Democratic Banner at Matawan, New Jersey. In 1852, he founded a weekly newspaper named the New Jersey Standard at his father's store in New Monmouth, using it as an outlet to not only publish his poetry and personal recollections, but also promote topics of interest to the paper's Monmouth County audience, allowing it to outperform the rest of the county's newspapers; he ultimately sold the paper within four years. Reportedly working in multiple newspapers in New York City in the past few years, he had been hired as editor of the New York Leader by 1858. He served as editor of Morford's Magazine for a brief time. (Note: Sources debate on the exact time: during the 1870s or from a founding date in January 1880 until March 1881.) He was also founder-editor of the Brooklyn New Monthly Magazine from 1880 to 1881, as well as editor of the Atlas and Aldine. "

Morford had a prolific career as a playwright and stage producer. One of his plays, The Bells of Shandon, had a performance of which was produced by John Brougham and performed at the Wallack's Theatre in 1867. His stage credits include The Struggle for Gold, The Merchant’s Honor, The Bells of Shandon, Love and Lightning, Secesh, The Outlaw of California, Look Out for the Draft, and Santa Claus, the vast majority of which were performed in New York City. He wrote several novels such as Shoulder-Straps (1863), The Days of Shoddy (1863), The Coward (1864), and Utterly Wrecked (1866), as well as an essay collection called Sprees and Splashes (1863). One of Morford's novels, John Jasper's Secret, was written as a sequel to Charles Dickens's The Mystery of Edwin Drood. He wrote "Love in the Pines, or Beauty among Charcoal", a serial on the Monmouth Democrat, in 1861.

Already experienced in prose and poetry, Morford started writing travel books with his book Over-Sea (1867), which he based on European travels he made in part to recover from health issues he was having. He published Morford's Short-Trip Guide to Europe (1868), Morford’s Short-Trip Guide to America (1872), and Paris and Half-Europe in ’78 (1879), the last of which was based on another trip he made to Europe. He wrote a Guide Book to Paris after visiting the Exposition Universelle in 1889. Hollis remarked that "despite being a prolific writer", the travel books were the only Morford works "that both commanded extensive attention and reflected a degree of literary ability." He also ran a New York City bookstore specializing in travel literature.

=== Personal life and death ===
Morford "never lost his affection for his native county"; he was also deeply interested in the Monmouth Centennial, at one point writing a poem about it. He supported an 1868 presidential campaign for George B. McClellan, writing the poem "Up Higher, McClellan" in support of him. Utterly Wrecked, which takes place in a coastal setting, drew inspiration from the Monmouth County part of the Jersey Shore.

Morford held socially conservative views towards women, having once written a Lippincott's Monthly Magazine essay critical of feminism in 1868. In addition to his editorial positions, he worked as clerk for the New York Court of Common Pleas from 1861 to 1868, as well as clerk of the New York City Board of Aldermen; Hollis noted that Morford, who was Republican, was not implicated in Tammany Hall's activities under the leadership of William M. Tweed.

Morford was reportedly known for working even at the helms of physical constraint. The Monmouth Democrat said that "few men have made a bolder or a braver fight than Henry Morford", remarking that despite his human nature he "possessed a noble and generous spirit, a heart to feel for his neighbor's woes." He often frequented Pfaff's, where he met fellow authors based in the New York City area.

Morford died on August 4, 1881, at his home in Brooklyn. At the time, he was planning to visit Maine to recover after falling ill earlier that year while visiting friends to Manhattan.

=== Themes and legacy ===
At the time of his death, The New York Times remarked that Morford, "by his literary ability and genial manners had endeared himself to many persons in Europe as well as in this country"; retrospectively, Hollis remarked that Morford's "verses were not widely known or respected by contemporary critics, and he did not remain long enough with any newspaper or periodical to establish a journalistic reputation". Franklin Ellis called him "a man of unusual literary attainments" in a local history book he authored in 1885, while Thomas H. Leonard called Morford "a very literary turn of mind" in his 1923 book From Indian Trail to Electric Rail.

Regarding The Rest of Don Juan, Hollis attributed Morford's interest in Don Juan (and also Byron in general) to "a morbid fascination with the poet’s theme of fatalism and the youthful death of Byron." Hollis noted that Morford originally started out with Civil War novels around the time it was taking place, before shifting towards "mediocre talent at best"; more specifically, the Monmouth Democrat noted that Shoulder-Straps centered on the "braggart gentry" who wore military decorations but did not see combat. In 1995, George H. Moss Jr. cited him as an example of poets who "those who have contributed to the poetic history of the Jersey Shore", alongside James Fenimore Cooper, Philip Freneau, and Walt Whitman.

In June 2023, the Middletown Township Historical Society and Middletown Township Public Library held a celebration of Morford's 200th birthday, with several Monmouth University students in attendance. Some of Morford's letters are archived in the Historical Society of Pennsylvania.
