= Thomas Butler Gunn =

English born illustrator and writer (1826–1904)

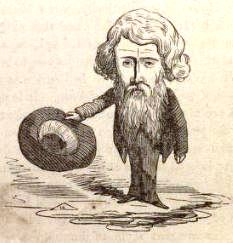
Thomas Butler Gunn

Thomas Butler Gunn (15 February 1826 – 7 April 1904) was an English born illustrator, writer and war correspondent who spent fourteen years in America. His diaries of this period provide details of his life amongst the bohemian writers and artist in New York including Frank Bellew, Sol Eytinge Jr., Fanny Fern, Thomas Nast, James Parton, Fitz James O'Brien, Alfred Waud and Walt Whitman.

== Early life ==
The Gunn family had been farming for several generations in the Banbury, Oxfordshire area of England. Gunn's father, Samuel, (1785–1863) grew up on a farm but left to start a grocery business. In 1809, he married Sarah Arnold, and they had two daughters before Sarah died in 1815. (Note: Only one of these daughters survived to adulthood, she was Mary Anne who married Joseph Greatbatch, the grandson of William Greatbatch (1735–1813), a potter. The family later changed its surname to Bristol, the maiden name of Joseph's mother.) In 1822, the widowed Samuel married Naomi Butler. Their son, Thomas Butler Gunn was born on 15 February 1826, as the second of their six children.

The family moved to John Street in the St. Pancras area of London in the 1830s. Gunn later recalled attending the sermons of controversial preacher James Harington Evans at the local John Street Baptist Chapel. The family next moved south of the river Thames to 10 Rodney Buildings, New Kent Road. During his early years, Gunn was articled to the architectural practise of Samuel Beazley in Soho Square and contributed with illustrations to various publications.

== America ==
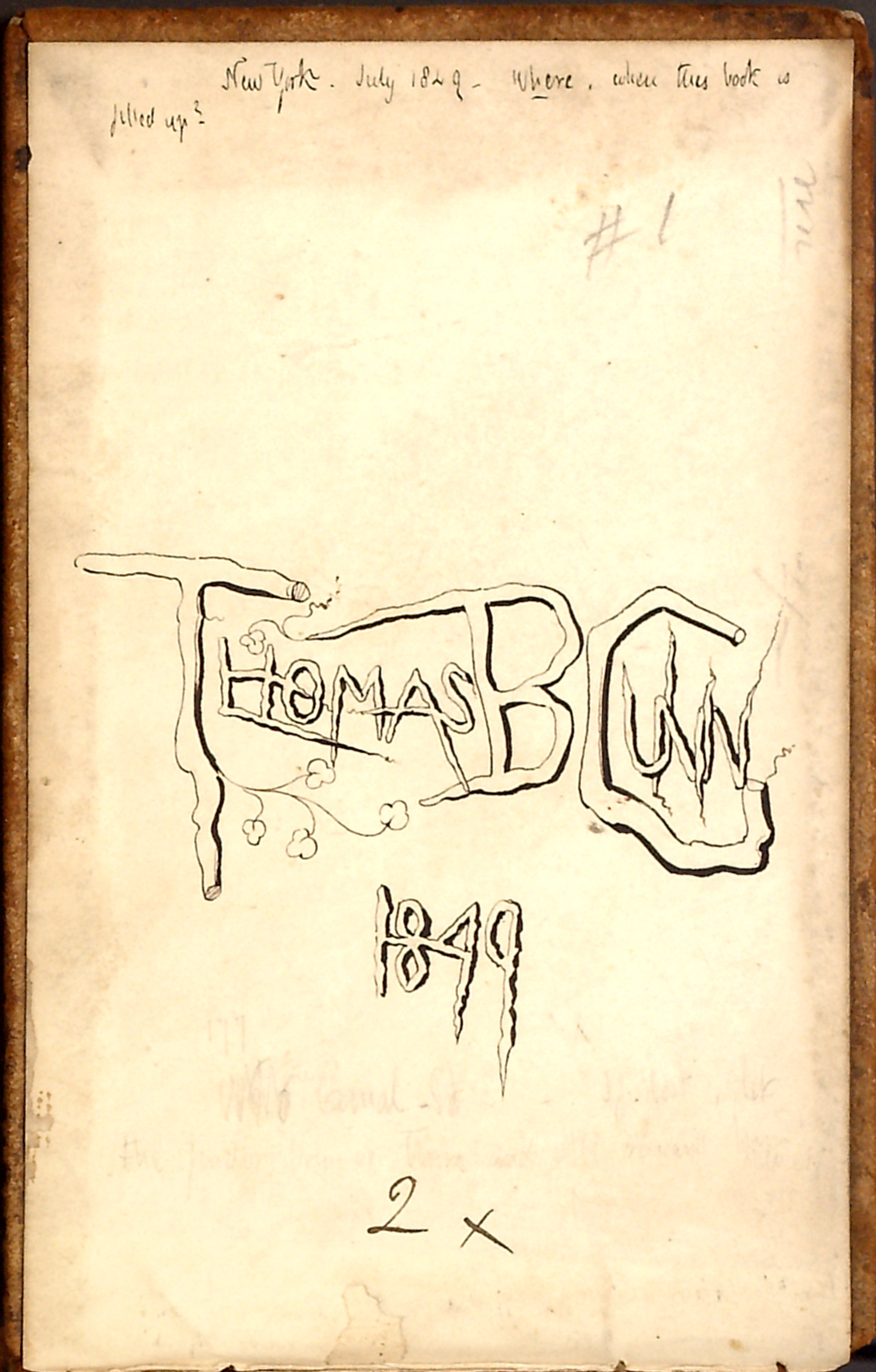
Front fly-leaf of Thomas Butler Gunn Diaries: Volume 1, page 2, July 1849

In 1849, Gunn traveled to America from London on board the Bark Wenham with two cousins, Richard Gunn and George Bolton, arriving in New York on 5 May. Initially, Gunn stayed in New Jersey with Bolton while he tried to find work as an illustrator, later moving to Manhattan. His father provided some financial support during these early years, but Gunn became so short on funds that in 1850 he was forced to take a job as a draughtsman at an architect's practice. He continued to look for freelance work but this was often poorly paid. For example, illustrations he created for Appleton & Company ( American publishing company founded by Daniel Appleton), took him five weeks to draw and he was only paid $12. He gradually obtained more work from periodicals such as New York Picayune, Pick, Diogenes hys Lanterne and others. The payments per illustration were still low, but by doing the rounds with his work, he began to establish a network of business and social contacts.

In 1850, he drew and designed a graphic novel call Mose Among the Britishers or The B'hoy in London. It featured the popular character of a Bowery b'hoy, said to be the legendary Mose Humphrey, who was played on the stage by actor Frank Chanfrau.

In 1853, Butler traveled to Mammoth Cave, spending nearly a week venturing with guides into the cave system.

Two and twenty miles cave walking, creeping, climbing and crawling had we done. I was wet to my knees, somewhat cut and bruised, my sturdy boots torn irrecoverably, not very tired, but satisfied with the Underground World.

== Return to England ==
In 1854, Gunn returned to England to see his family and to propose to his childhood friend Hannah Bennett (c. 1828 – 1906). She accepted but the couple did not marry at this time and kept the arrangement secret from all but a few trusted friends. Gunn returned to New York in 1855 and the couple did not see each other until 1863, although they corresponded.

== Return to America ==
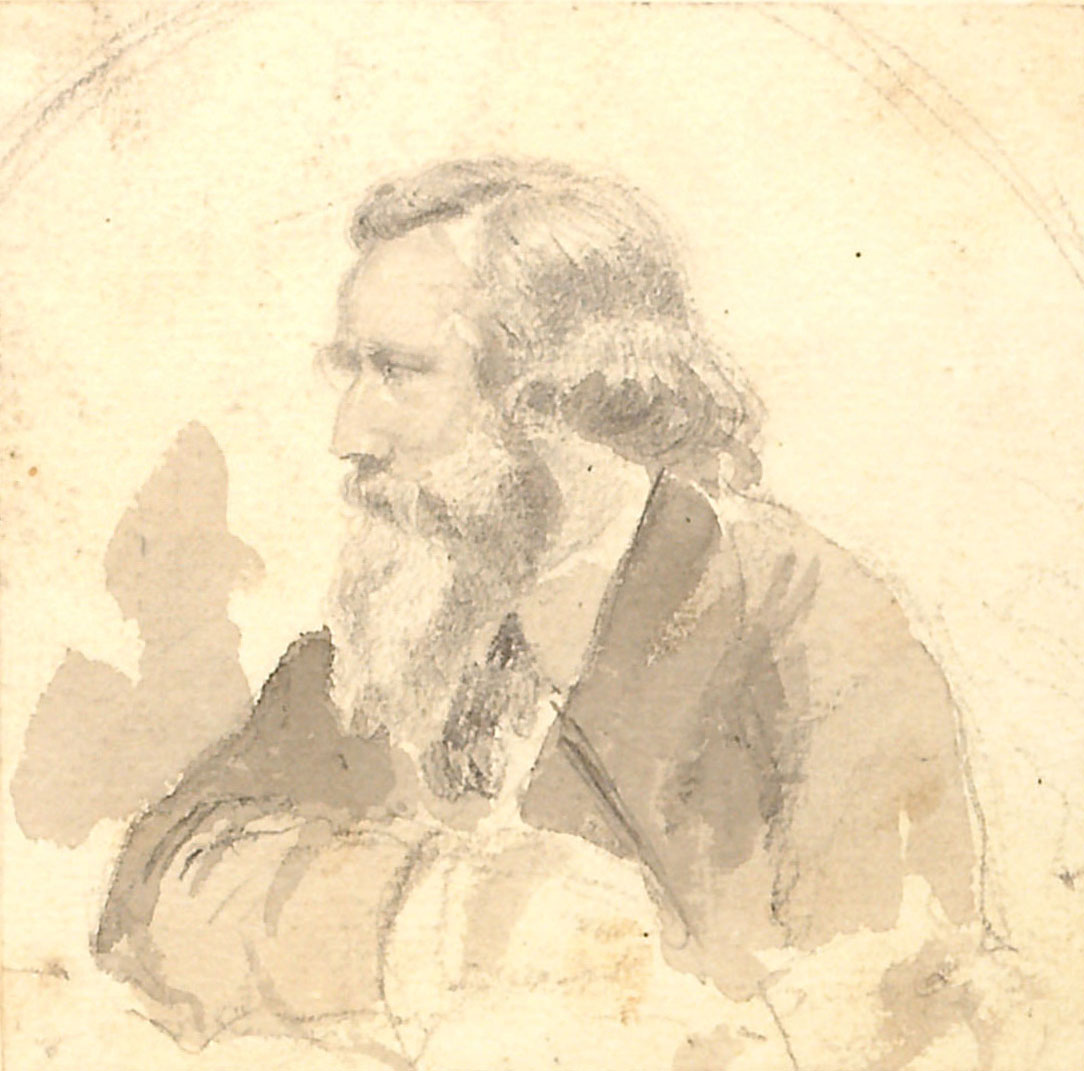
Thomas Butler Gunn by his friend Sol Eytinge Jr., ca. 1856

Gunn gradually became more involved with writing and in 1857 published The Physiology of New York Boarding-houses, based on his personal experiences, with illustrations by his friends Frank Bellew (pen-name Triangle) and Alfred Waud. This concept of analysing normal life in literature began in Paris and had been used in the 1840s by Albert Richard Smith in Punch, with works such as Physiology of the London Medical Student and Physiology of London Evening Parties.

In 1852, Gunn made acquaintance with Thomas Powell, who had been editing the Diogenes hys Lanterne (Lantern). Powell was an Englishman who knew many of the famous authors of the period, including Dickens, Wordsworth, Elizabeth Barrett and Robert Browning. He started to sell autographs and works by these and others, but the authenticity was questioned. To avoid the risk of prosecution for fraud, Powell fled to America where he restarted his career. He had used some of Gunn's drawings while he was editing the Lantern, but he was always reluctant to pay for them. For this and other reasons, Gunn took a dislike to him, and some years later, wrote a satirical work on the life of Powell called Paul Gower, a Rationalistic Story of English and American Life.

== War correspondent ==
In 1860, as the country moved towards civil war, Gunn was sent to Charleston, South Carolina, as an artist-reporter by John Bigelow, editor of the New York Evening Post. A subterfuge was required to prevent Gunn being identified as a despised New York newspaperman, which could have resulted in him being tarred and feathered. He obtained a British passport so that he could say he was reporting for a London paper and then agreed with the editor in New York that his reports would be filed under the name of Edgar Bolton. Copies of some of the reports he sent back were pasted into his diaries; in one he predicts the attack on Fort Sumter. Gunn returned to New York on 16 February 1861, and the attack on the Fort started 12 April.

When the Civil War began, Gunn tried to get a posting as a war correspondent and was eventually engaged by Charles Anderson Dana of the New-York Tribune. In March 1862, he left New York for Alexandria, Virginia via Washington where he joined General Heintzelman's military camp. He reported on the battles of both Yorktown and Williamsburg. Gunn's editor Charles Dana had left the Tribune by April of that year and was replaced by Sydney Howard Gay. Gunn was submitting his reports late, and because of this, Gay was forced to copy stories out of the New York Herald, a rival newspaper. He wrote to Gunn explaining the situation and telling him to speed things up. The letter fell into the hands of a Herald journalist who promptly published it, much to the anger and embarrassment of the connections at the Tribune. Gunn finished his assignment in June 1862 and returned to New York. While away he learnt of the death of his friend and fellow writer Fitz James O'Brien, who had died from complication after being injured in a skirmish with Confederate troops.

Shortly after his return, Gunn accepted another assignment from the Tribune, this time to Port Royal, South Carolina. He arrived at Hilton Head and traveled to Beaufort. His intention was to get to James Island where he had heard rumours that the Union forces were due to mount an attack. However, news came through of the defeat and setback for the Northern forces (see article Battle of Secessionville). Gunn visited the island soon after the battle and filed his report with the Tribune. A two-page copy also was pasted in his diary. Gun returned to New York in September 1862 after visiting Fort Pulaski, St. Augustine, and Key West.

Gunn's last assignment for the Tribune as a war correspondent was with the forces of General Nathaniel Prentice Banks, who sailed to New Orleans from New York in December 1862 with 31,000 troops. Banks planned to attack Port Hudson and stationed his troops at New Orleans and Baton Rouge while preparations were made. Gunn, who had received letters from Hannah Bennett in England with news of his father, returned to New York in late March 1863 before the attack on Port Hudson took place.

== Return to England ==
Gunn's father had been ill for many years but the end came in November 1863. By this time, Gunn was home with his family in England, and he was planning his marriage to Hannah Bennett, whose own father had died in 1862. They married on 29 December 1863, and lived in a village on the outskirts of Banbury called Wardington. Hannah gave birth to their only child on 5 November 1865, but the baby was stillborn.

Gunn continued to write for newspapers with subjects often related to British history. These were well researched works and included series on local churches, villages, battles on English soil and individuals such as the highwayman Dick Turpin. Some of these articles were published in America. He also wrote verse and in 1885 his political poem, Hodge's Triumph, was published in the Banbury Guardian (24 December). This related to the changes in the voting system that allowed many more working class individuals to participate, and led to the Liberal party winning the election. The name Hodge was commonly used in 19th century Britain to stereotype agricultural labourers, often in derogatory terms.

Gunn died in a hospital in Birmingham on 7 April 1904, and is buried in the Southam Road Cemetery, Banbury. His wife Hannah died on 12 September 1906, at age 78 and is buried in St Mary Magdalene Church in Wardington.

== Bohemians of New York ==
Thomas Butler Gunn's name is associated with the bohemian set of writers and artist of New York who often frequented Pfaff's beer cellar. In Gunn's diaries, he mentions many of them and describes their lives, often in terms of gossip. His milieu included individuals such as Frank Bellew, Sol Eytinge Jr., Fanny Fern, Thomas Nast, James Parton, Fitz James O'Brien, Alfred Waud and Walt Whitman. His diaries of this period have been transcribed by the Missouri History Museum.
