= Fitz-James O'Brien =

American early science fiction and fantasy writer (1826/8–1862)

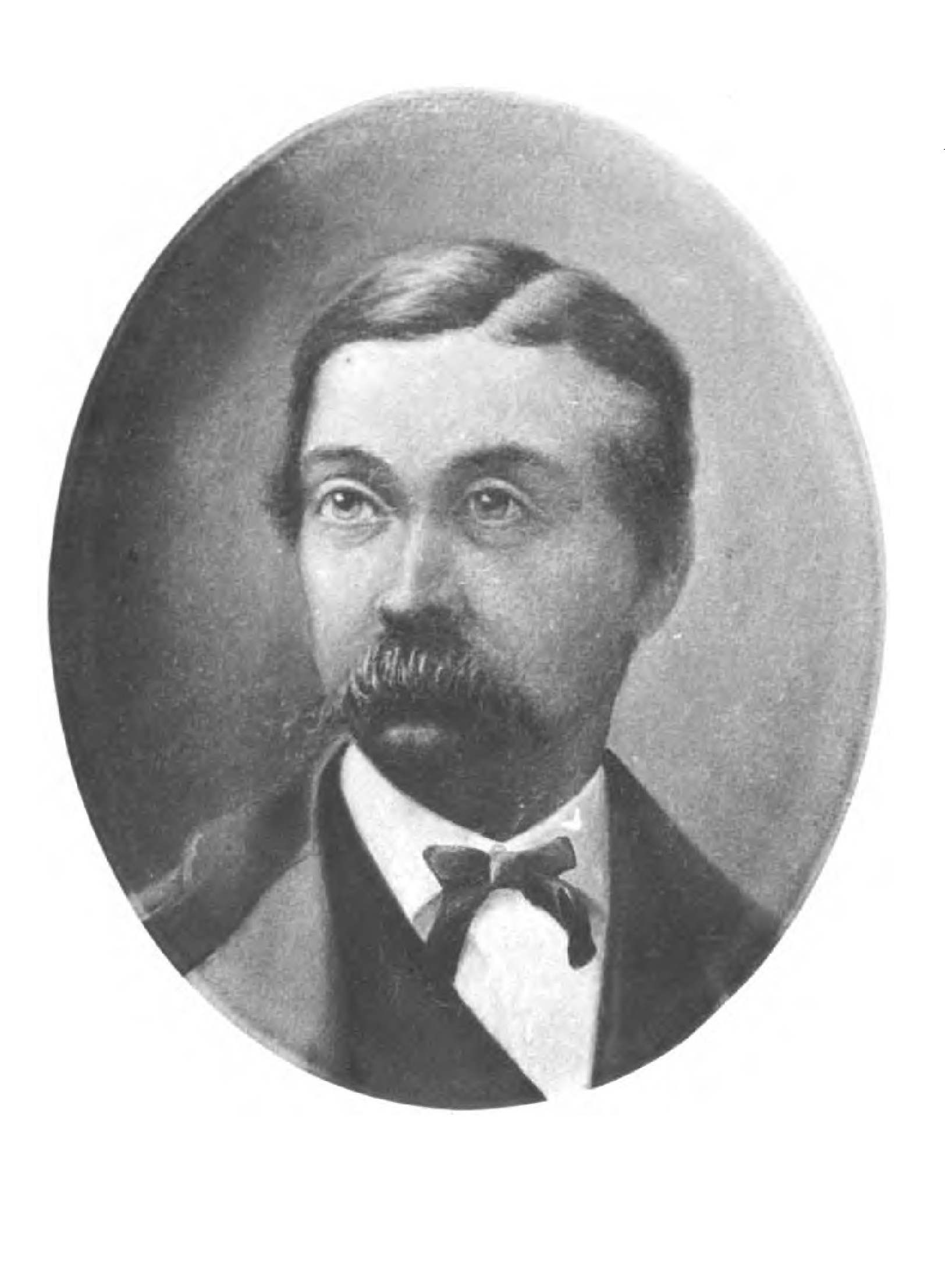
- Sketch of Fitz-James O'Brien by William Winter 1881
- Born: 25 October 1826; Cork, Ireland
- Died: 6 April 1862 (aged 35); Cumberland, Maryland
- Occupations: Writer, poet, soldier
- Writing career
- Movement: Gothic fiction

Fitz-James O'Brien (25 October 1826 – 6 April 1862) was an Irish–American writer of works in fantasy and science fiction short stories. His career was marked by a significant contribution to the American literary scene in the mid-19th century.

== Biography ==
=== Early life and influences ===
O'Brien was born in County Cork, Ireland; the exact date and year of his birth is debated. His first biographer, Francis Wolle, placed it between April and December 1828. His father, James O'Brien, was an attorney of some influence, while his paternal grandparents, Michael O'Brien and Catherine Deasy, owned Brownstone House near Clonakilty. Her parents, Michael and Helen O'Driscoll, owned Baltimore House in County Limerick. After James's death in 1839/40, Eliza remarried DeCourcy O'Grady, and the family moved to Limerick, where O'Brien spent most of his teenage years.

O'Brien had a privileged upbringing, taking up activities like hunting, fishing, horseback riding, boating, and shooting. He also liked birdwatching, which influenced his semi-autobiographical works and fiction stories. Due to his family's wealth, he read from a young age, with an interest in English Romantics. Edgar Allan Poe held the strongest influence on O'Brien in his formative years.

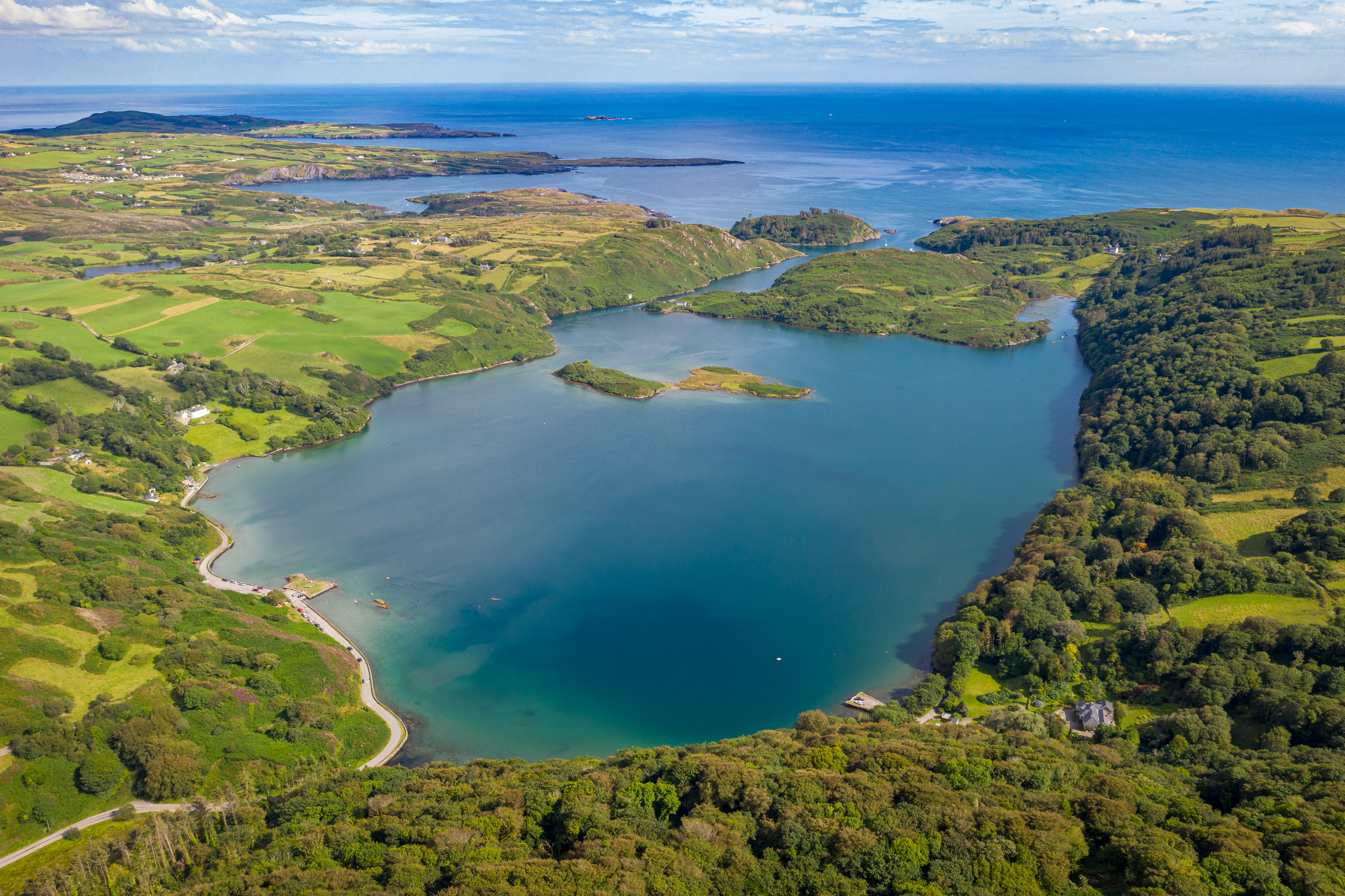
Aerial view of Lough Hyne from July 2019

O'Brien's earliest works concern Ireland, particularly in the geography of the south west. His first six poems were published in The Nation, a weekly Irish newspaper founded in 1842 to promote Irish nationalism.

=== Early career ===
In 1849, O'Brien inherited around £8,000 from his father and maternal grandfather, a substantial sum that reflected the financial standing of his family. This inheritance enabled him to leave Ireland and embark on a new chapter in London, where he would ultimately sever ties with his family. Despite this physical distance, O'Brien maintained a connection to Ireland, often reflected in his published writings, which frequently explored themes of identity and nostalgia.

O'Brien's arrival in London marked the beginning of his career. His stepfather's established surname, O'Grady, opened doors to esteemed social circles. He took in the city's cultural offerings, attending parties and theatrical performances. However, within two years O'Brien had spent his inheritance, prompting him to seek work. His past writings presented opportunities, with several pieces having already been published in The Family Friend, a London-based magazine founded in January 1849. By the end of that year, he achieved a significant milestone with his first paid publication, marking the beginning of his professional writing career.

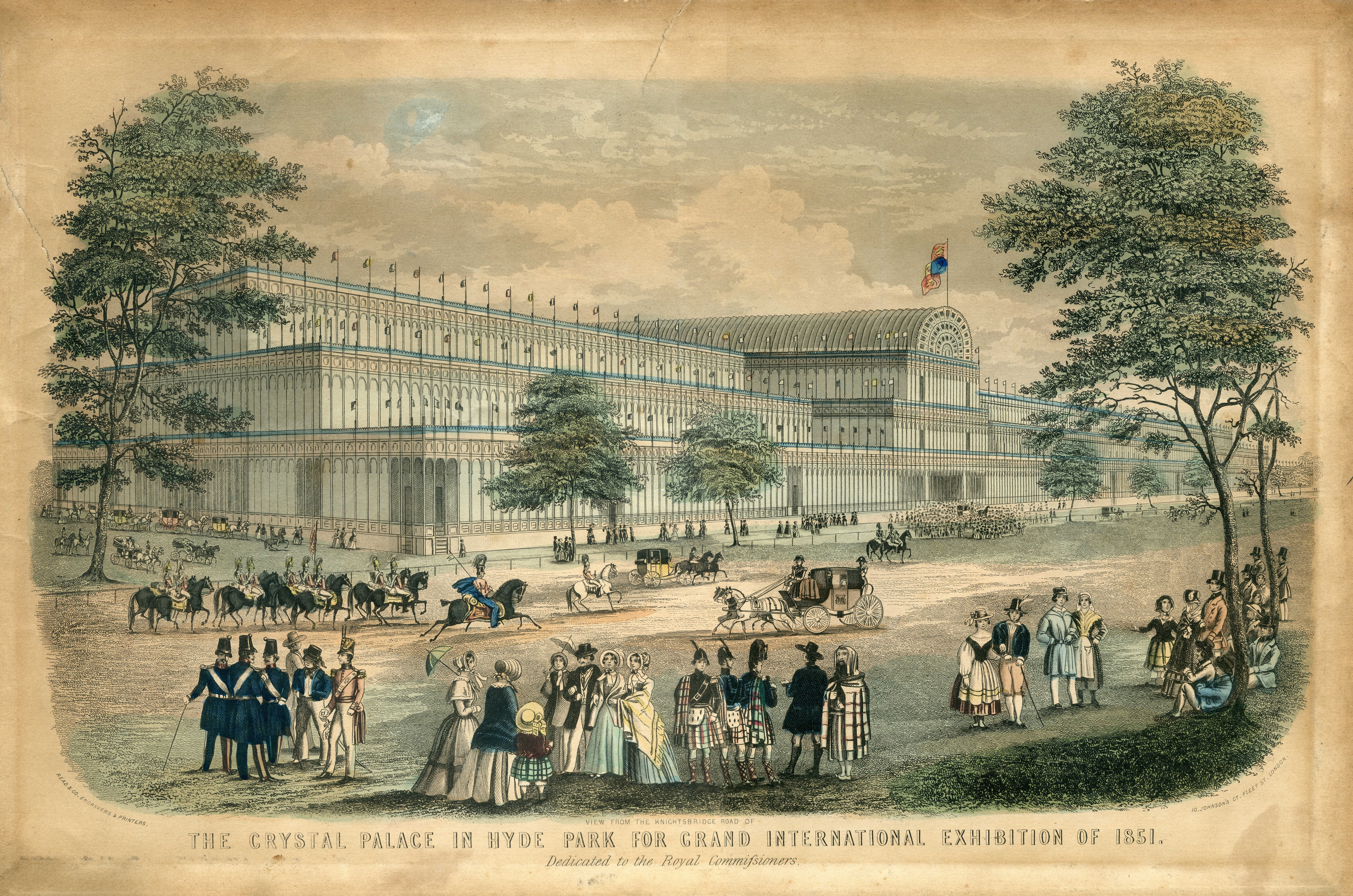
The Crystal Palace in Hyde Park for the Grand International Exhibition of 1851

In 1851, O'Brien's career reached a turning point with the Great Exhibition in London. The event provided a platform to showcase technological advancements and support the middle class. Within the Crystal Palace, O'Brien was appointed editor for The Parlour Magazine. In this role, he provided translations for French literary works and wrote original pieces, while also serving as chief editor. The nature of this work within the central hub of the world fair consumed O'Brien's time and energy but provided him with writing experience. In 1852, O'Brien suddenly departed from London for the United States, amid rumors of an affair with a married woman. He boarded the first ship bound for the country, with little money but letters of recommendation.

=== Life in the United States ===
O'Brien's first year in America proved fruitful. He established connections, including a friendship with the Irish-American John Brougham, who launched the comedic publication The Lantern. O'Brien took a position there, his first entry in American literature. He also became acquainted with Frank H. Bellew, an illustrator who drew O'Brien's works in The Lantern and other publications throughout his career.

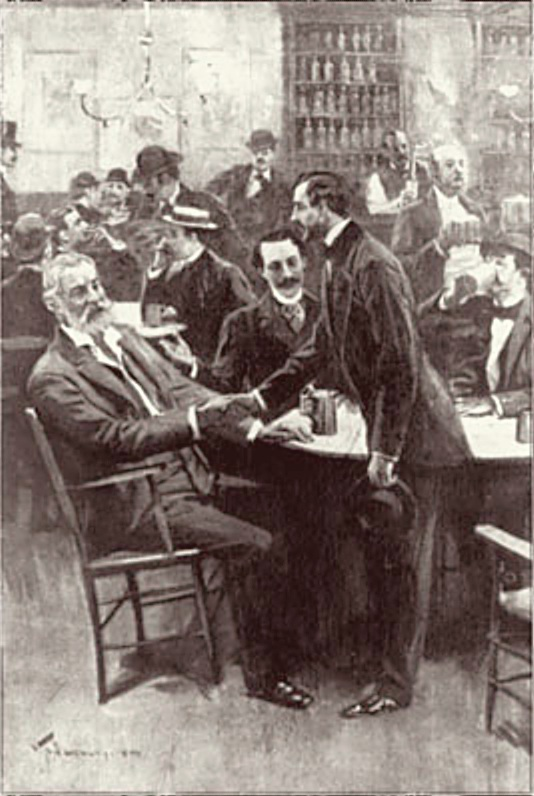
Pfaff's beer cellar in 1857. Depicted seated at left is the writer and poet Walt Whitman.

During the early 1850s, O'Brien made friendships at Pfaff's Beer Hall, a hub for the New York City Bohemians. This circle, led by Henry Clapp Jr. and Ada Clare, included figures like Brougham and O'Brien, who assumed major roles. The New York Bohemians comprised an array of local artists, creating an atmosphere of creative intellectual exchange.

O'Brien paid homage to the Bohemian movement in his story "The Bohemian" (1855), published in Harper's New Monthly Magazine. While he engaged in the Bohemian lifestyle, his writing did not focus on these experiences. His non-speculative fiction and poetry continued to address social issues, involving characters confronting their surroundings with courage. Despite the anonymity of publishing in that era, which made it challenging to get contributions, O'Brien's output and impact on the landscape was known. In 1855, he published seven poems and ten stories, followed by six poems and eight stories in 1856, and eleven poems and four stories in 1857.

=== Ascendancy in weird and horror fiction ===
The year 1858 marked a significant turning point in O'Brien's literary journey as he delved into weird and horror fiction, just as the influence of Romanticism was waning. O'Brien adeptly incorporated many of Edgar Allen Poe's writing techniques. His infused contemporary sensibilities into his narratives, setting tales of terror within commonplace settings. This approach allowed him to bridge tales of terror with emerging methods of modern Realism, foreshadowing the literary movements of Modernism and Postmodernism. O'Brien expanded the boundaries of the genre, serving as a link between Romanticism and Realism.

One of his most notable achievements is "The Diamond Lens", published in The Atlantic Monthly in January 1858. This work exemplifies O'Brien's ability to blend elements of the uncanny with a contemporary perspective. The narrative revolves around a mad scientist driven by an insatiable thirst for knowledge, a theme that recurs in O'Brien's work. The pursuit of scientific enlightenment is tainted by the protagonist's irrational desires and relentless quest for fame and fortune, leading him to morally questionable actions. The story, infused with philosophical undertones and moral introspection, prompts readers to contemplate fundamental questions about the human condition.

In 1859, O'Brien solidified his literary prowess with two more stories: "What Was It? A Mystery" in Harper's New Monthly Magazine and "The Wondersmith" in The Atlantic. Both stories have become classics in horror and science fiction. "What Was It?" explores the concept of invisibility, while "The Wondersmith" is often regarded as the first story to explore robots. These narratives delve into profound philosophical territories, provoking contemplation on reality, ethics, and morality. O'Brien's ability to intertwine philosophical depth with riveting storytelling cemented his status as a luminary of speculative fiction.

=== American Civil War and O'Brien's commitment ===
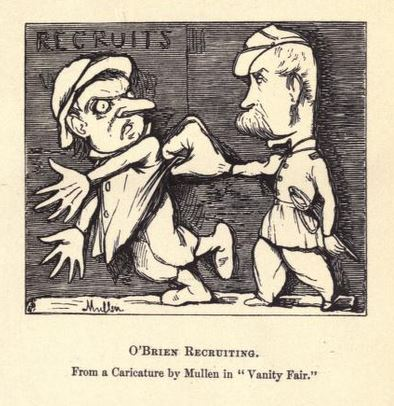
A period cartoon featuring O'Brien

In the 1850s, the issue of slavery widened the divide between the north and south. At Pfaff's Beer Hall, patrons viewed the divide cynically, seeing it as a power struggle exploiting the common man for personal gain. They believed neither the Democratic nor the Republican Party genuinely believed in the nation's best interests, viewing the 1860 election as a shift in the privilege to plunder the country.

Dissenting voices, including O'Brien's, emerged. While some saw the war as a power struggle, O'Brien would find a greater significance in the conflict. The attack on Fort Sumter on April 12, 1861, ignited Unionist fervor, resonating in New York. In response to President Lincoln's call for support, New York mustered over thirteen thousand troops to guard Washington. A crowd of over one hundred thousand gathered at Union Square to bid farewell to the 7th New York Militia Regiment, composed of young merchants, bankers, professionals, and clerks, enlisted to defend Washington.

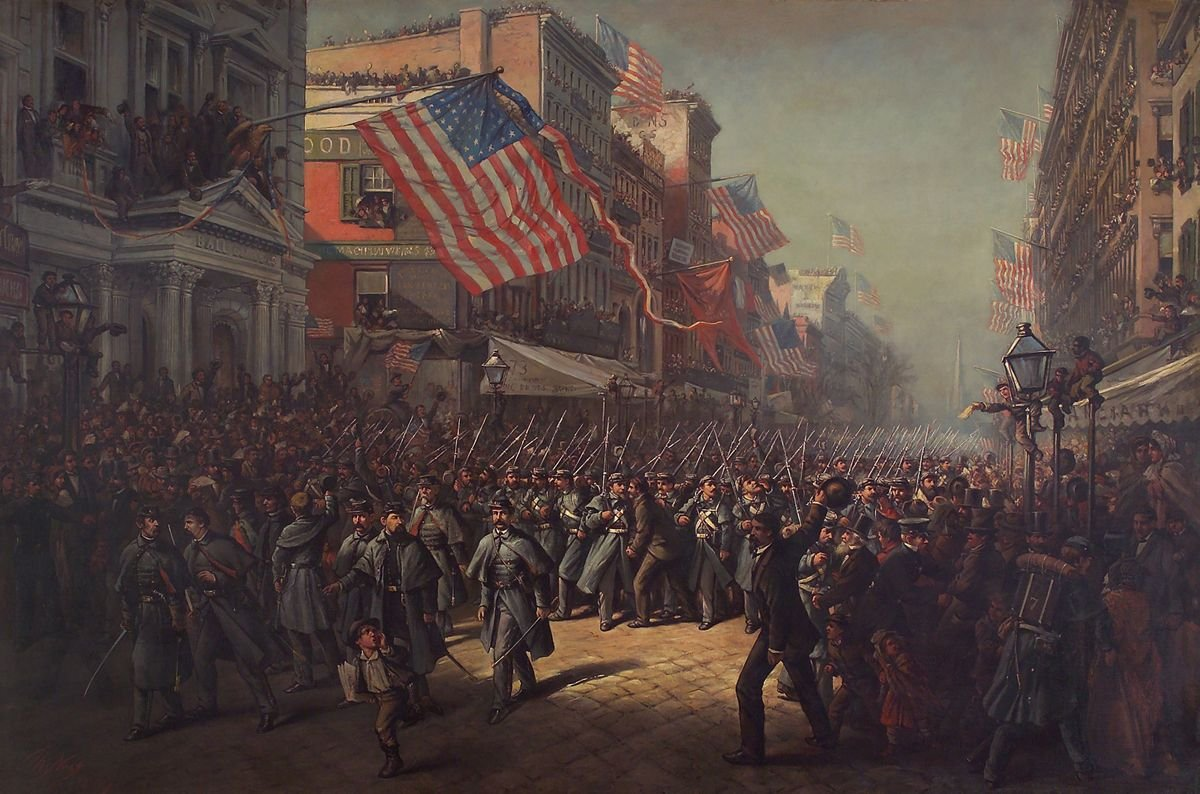
The Departure of the 7th Regiment

O'Brien enlisted in the New York 7th Regiment, joining the defense of the capital. Despite a warm welcome upon their return to New York on June 1, 1861, O'Brien continued to seek opportunities to contribute, eventually joining General Lander's staff in Virginia. O'Brien was deployed to Bloomery Gap, where he faced "Stonewall" Jackson's cavalry. O'Brien, wounded in battle, succumbed to complications from infection on April 6, 1862, aged 35.

His friend William Winter collected The Poems and Stories of Fitz James O'Brien, to which are added personal recollections by associates that knew him. Winter wrote a chapter on O'Brien in his book Brown Heath and Blue Bells (New York, 1895). O'Brien was satirized as "Fitzgammon O'Bouncer" in William North's posthumously published novel The Slave of the Lamp (1855).

== Bibliography ==
=== Short stories ===
- "Philosophy in Disguise" (The Family Friend, Nov. 1849).
- "The Story of a Child" (The Family Friend, Mar. 1851).
- "The Sunbeam, the Dew-Drop, and the Rose" (The Parlour Magazine, May 1851).
- "An Arabian Night-mare" (Household Words, Nov. 8, 1851).
- "A Legend of Barlagh Cave" (The Home Companion, Jan. 31, 1852).
- "The Wonderful Adventures of Mr. Papplewick" (The Lantern, 1852).
- "The Gory Gnome; or, The Lurid Lamp of the Volcano!" (The Lantern, Feb. 1852).
- "Aladdin at the Crystal Palace; or, Science versus Fairy-Land" (The Leisure Hour, Apr. 1852).
- "The Old Boy" (The American Whig Review, Aug. 1852).
- "The Man Without a Shadow" (The Lantern, Sep. 4, 1852).
- "A Voyage in My Bed" (The American Whig Review, Aug. 1852).
- "One Event" (The American Whig Review, Oct. 1852).
- "The King of Nodland and His Dwarf" (The American Whig Review, Dec. 1852).
- "A Peep Behind the Scenes" (Harper's New Monthly Magazine, Mar. 1854).
- "The Bohemian" (Harper's New Monthly Magazine, Jul. 1855).
- "Duke Humphrey's Dinner" (Harper's New Monthly Magazine, Aug. 1855).
- "The Pot of Tulips" (Harper's New Monthly Magazine, Nov. 1855).
- "The Dragon-Fang Possessed by the Conjuror Piou-Lu" (Harper's New Monthly Magazine, Mar. 1856).
- "The Hasheesh Eater" (Putnam's Monthly Magazine, Sep. 1856).
- "A Terrible Night" (Harper's New Monthly Magazine, Oct. 1856).
- "The Mezzo-Matti" (Putnam's Monthly Magazine, Nov. 1856).
- "The Crystal Bell" (Harper's New Monthly Magazine, Dec. 1856).
- "A Day Dream" (Harper's Weekly, Feb. 21, 1857).
- "Broadway Bedeviled" (Putnam's Monthly Magazine, Mar. 1857).
- "Uncle and Nephew" (Harper's New Monthly Magazine, Mar. 1857).
- "The Comet and I" (Harper's Weekly, May 23, 1857).
- "My Wife's Tempter" (Harper's Weekly, Dec. 12, 1857).
- "The Diamond Lens" (The Atlantic Monthly, Jan. 1858).
- "From Hand to Mouth" (The New York Picayune, 1858).
- "The Golden Ingot" (The Knickerbocker, or New-York Monthly Magazine, Aug. 1858).
- "The Lost Room" (Harper's New Monthly Magazine, Sep. 1858).
- "Jubal, the Ringer" (The Knickerbocker, or New-York Monthly Magazine, Sep. 1858).
- "Three of a Trade; or, Red Little Kriss Kringle" (Saturday Press, Dec. 25, 1858).
- "What Was It? A Mystery" (Harper's New Monthly Magazine, Mar. 1859).
- "The Wondersmith" (The Atlantic Monthly, Oct. 1859).
- "Mother of Pearl" (Harper's New Monthly Magazine, Feb. 1860).
- "The Child That Loved a Grave" (Harper's New Monthly Magazine, Apr. 1861).
- "Tommatoo" (Harper's New Monthly Magazine, Aug. 1862).
- "How I Lost My Gravity" (Harper's New Monthly Magazine, May 1864).

=== Poetry ===
- "Oh! Give a Desert Life to Me" (The Nation, Dublin, Mar. 15, 1845).
- "Loch Ina, A Beautiful Salt-Water Lake, in the County of Cork" (The Nation, Dublin, Jul. 26, 1845).
- "The Famine" (The Nation, Dublin, Mar. 7, 1846).
- "Excelsior" (The Nation Dublin, Mar. 13, 1847).
- "Una of Lough Ine: A Ballad" (The Cork Magazine , Aug 1848)
- "Serenade" (The Cork Magazine, Sept 1848)
- "The Loves and the Fate of the Dragon Fly and the Water Lily" (The Cork Magazine, Sep. 1848)
- "The Fishers Lay" (The Cork Magazine, Oct 1848)
- "Where shall we dwell?" (The Cork Magazine Oct 1848)
- "The Epicurean" (The Cork Magazine, Nov 1848)
- "Forest Thoughts" (The Cork Magazine, Dec. 1848).
- "Our old Garden Chair" (The Parlour Magazine, Jun, 1851)
- "The Lonely Oak" (The Parlour Magazine, Jul 12, 1851).
- "The Spectral Shirt" (The Lantern, Jun. 5, 1852).
- "Madness" (The American Whig Review, Aug. 1852).
- "Pallida" (The American Whig Review, Sep. 1852).
- "The Song of the Immortal Gods" (The American Whig Review, Sep. 1852).
- "The Old Knight's Wassail" (The American Whig Review, Sep. 1852).
- "The Shadow by the Tree" (The American Whig Review, Oct. 1852).
- "Oinea" (The American Whig Review, Dec. 1852).
- "Sir Brasil's Falcon" (United States Magazine and Democratic Review, Sep. 1853).
- "The Heath" (The Evening Post, Oct. 19, 1855).
- "Sing Linnet, Sing" (The Evening Post , Oct 20, 1855)
- "An Episode" (The Evening Post, May. 1, 1856).
- "By the Alders" (The Home Journal, Oct. 25, 1856, New York, (Vol. 43, Issue 559).
- "How the Bell Rang (July 4, 1776)" (Harper's Weekly, Jul. 4, 1857).
- "Love at a Lattice" (Harpers New Monthly Magazine, Dec. 1858)
- "The Ghosts" (The Knickerbocker, or New-York Monthly Review, Jan. 1859).
- "The Lost Steamship" (Harpers New Monthly Magazine, Apr. 1860)
- "The Sewing Bird" (Harper's New Monthly Magazine, Sep. 1860)
- "The Midnight March" (The History of the Seventh Regiment, edited by Colonel Emmons Clark, Vol. II, N.Y., 1890).
- "The Man at the Door" (The Knickerbocker, or New-York Monthly Review, Jan. 1861).

=== Essays ===
- "Literature as a Profession-Difficulties of Writers" (The New York Times, Nov. 1852).
- "The Two Skulls" (Harper's New Monthly Magazine, Feb. 1853).
- "The Way to Get Burried" (The New York Daily Times, Mar. 19, 1853).
- "Bird Gossip" (Harper's New Monthly Magazine, Nov. 1855).

=== Collections ===
- Winter, William, ed. (1881). The Poems and Stories of Fitz James O'Brien. Boston: James R. Osgood and Co.
- ___. (1893). The Diamond Lens with Other Stories by Fitz-James O'Brien. New York: Charles Scribner's Sons.
- O'Brien, Edward J., ed. (1925). Collected Stories by Fitz-James O'Brien. New York: Albert and Charles Boni.
- Seldes, Gilbert, ed. (1932). The Diamond Lens and Other Stories by Fitz-James O'Brien. Illustrations by Ferdinand Huszti Howath. New York: William Edwin Rudge.
- Salmonson, Jessica Amanda, ed. (1988). The Supernatural Tales of Fitz-James O'Brien, Vol. One: Macabre Tales. New York: Doubleday.
- ___. (1988). The Supernatural Tales of Fitz-James O'Brien, Vol. Two: Dream Stories and Fantasies. New York: Doubleday.
- Kime, Wayne R., ed. (2003). Fitz-James O'Brien: Selected Literary Journalism, 1852–1860. Selinsgrove, Pennsylvania: Susquehanna University Press, ISBN 1-57591-070-5
- Salmonson, Jessica Amanda, ed. (2008). The Wondersmith and Others. Ashcroft, British Columbia: Ash-Tree Press.
- Hayes, Michael, ed. (2010). The Fantastic Tales of Fitz-James O'Brien. London: John Calder Press.
- Kime, Wayne R., ed. (2011). Behind the Curtain: Selected Fiction of Fitz-James O'Brien, 1853–1860. Newark: University of Delaware Press.
- ___. (2012) Thirteen Stories by Fitz-James O'Brien: The Realm of the Mind. Newark: University of Delaware Press.
- Irish, John P., ed. (2025). Fitz-James O'Brien: An Arabian Night-mare and Others (1848–1854). Dublin, Ireland: Swan River Press, ISBN 978-1-78380-051-3
- ___. (2025). Fitz-James O'Brien: The Diamond Lens and Others (1855–1858). Dublin, Ireland: Swan River Press, ISBN 978-1-78380-052-0
- ___. (2025). Fitz-James O'Brien: What Was It? and Others (1858–1864). Dublin, Ireland: Swan River Press; ISBN 978-1-78380-053-7
- ___. (2026). Fitz-James O'Brien: The Lost Room and other Speculative Fiction. (Classics of Gothic Horror). New York: Hippocampus Press (forthcoming).
