= William Winter (author) =

19th-century American critic and writer (1836-1917)

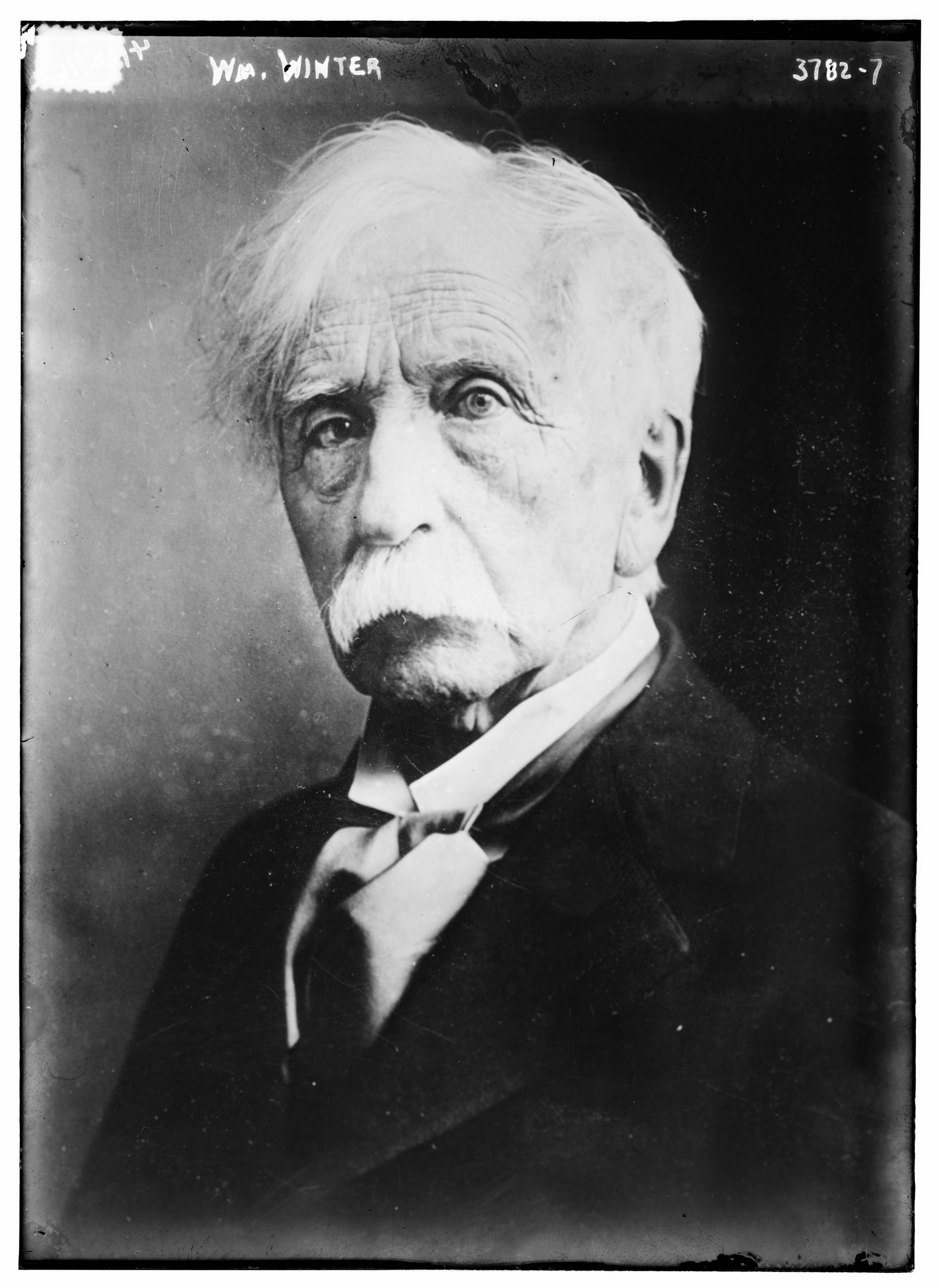
- William Winter, circa 1915
- Born: July 15, 1836; Gloucester, Massachusetts, United States
- Died: June 30, 1917 (aged 80); New Brighton, Staten Island, United States
- Burial place: Silver Mount Cemetery, Staten Island, United States
- Education: Harvard University
- Spouse: Elizabeth Campbell (m. 1860)
- Children: 5

William Winter (July 15, 1836 – June 30, 1917) was an American drama critic, journalist, essayist, poet, and author. Beginning in the 1850s, he established a literary career in New York City, where he became associated with the Bohemian movement.

Known for his Romantic poetry, he wrote theatrical criticism, essays, and brief biographies. By 1854, Winter had published a collection of poetry and worked as a reviewer for the Boston Transcript. He relocated to New York in 1856 and became the assistant editor of The Saturday Press, a weekly publication of literary and social commentary was published intermittently from 1858 to 1866. He also worked as a theater critic for the New York Tribune.

== Biography ==
Winter frequented Pfaff's, a Greenwich Village Bohemian hotspot, along with writers and artists such as Walt Whitman, Mark Twain, Winslow Homer, Edwin Booth, Adah Isaacs Menken, Ada Clare, and Horatio Alger Jr.

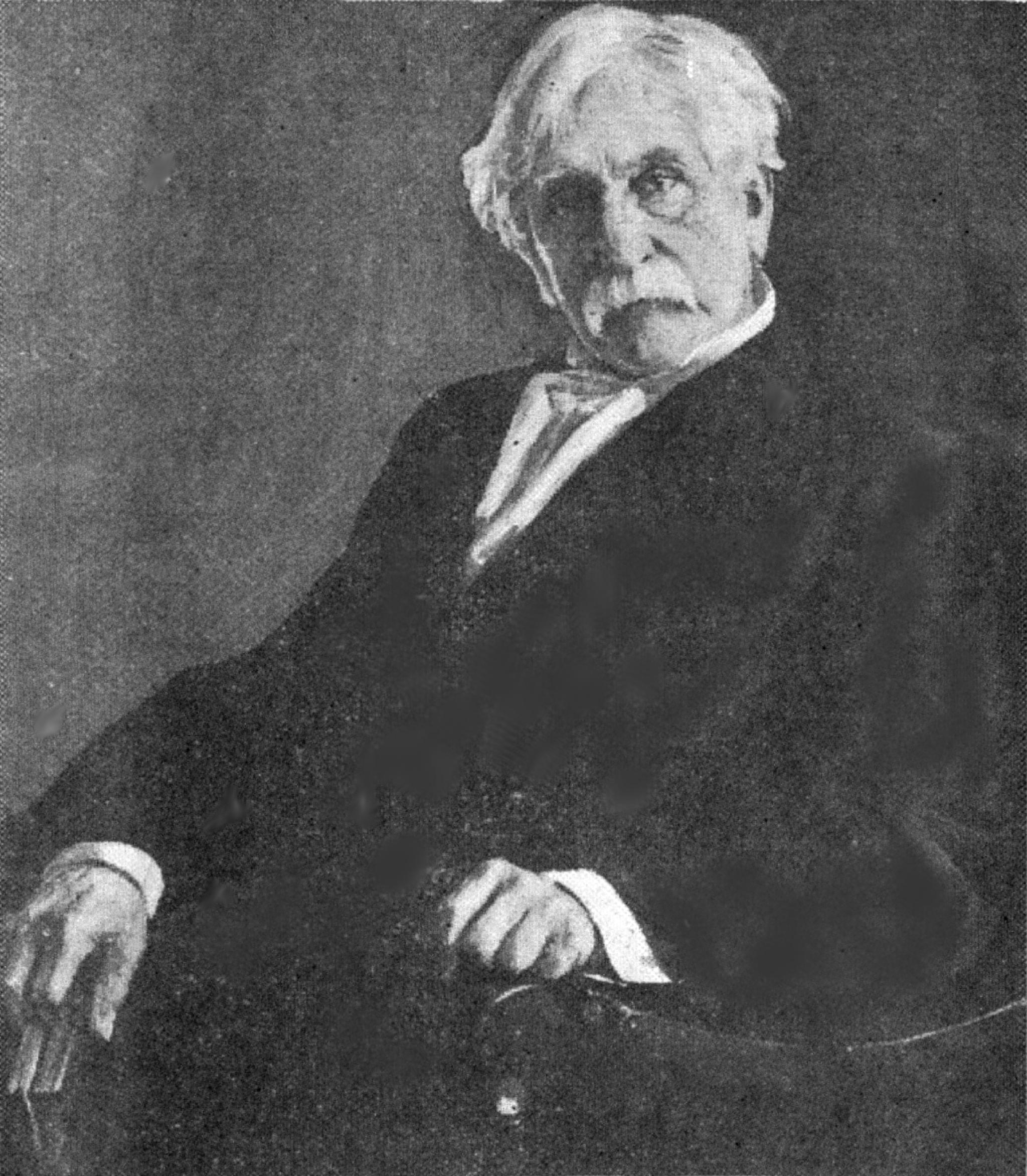

In the 1880s, he began publishing biographies of thespians like the Jefferson family and Edwin Booth.

Winter opposed the modernist theater of playwrights like Ibsen, arguing that drama should be a moral force. He was particularly critical of the psychological realism and social critiques present in Ibsen's plays, viewing them as a departure from the idealized and morally instructive nature of traditional drama.

Winter left two archives of biographies and essays on stars like Edwin Booth and Sir Henry Irving, in addition to career papers documenting his work as a writer and critic. Part of his archive was purchased by theater and film producer and collector Messmore Kendall, who donated his collection of William Winter's papers and books, along with Harry Houdini's archive, to the University of Texas at Austin. These materials are now available for research at the Harry Ransom Center.

His legacy is preserved at the Folger Shakespeare Library's Robert Young Collection on William Winter.

== Personal life ==
Winter was born on July 15, 1836, in Gloucester. He graduated from Harvard Law School in 1857.

In 1860, Winter married Scottish poet and novelist Elizabeth Campbell, and they raised their five children in Staten Island, New York.

In 1886, in commemoration of the death of his son, he founded a library at Staten Island Academy in Stapleton, New York.

He died in New Brighton, Staten Island, on June 30, 1917, at 80 years of age, after a bout of angina pectoris. He was buried in the Silver Mount Cemetery.

== Works ==
His writings include:

- The Convent, and other Poems (Boston, 1854)
- The Queen's Domain, and other Poems (1858)
- My Witness: a Book of Verse (1871)
- Sketch of the Life of Edwin Booth (1871)
- Thistledown: a Book of Lyrics (1878)
- The Trip to England (1879)
- Poems: Complete Edition (1881)
- The Jeffersons (1881)
- English Rambles and other Fugitive Pieces (Boston, 1884)
- Henry Irving (1885)
- The Stage Life of Mary Anderson (1886)
- Shakespeare's England (1888)
- Brief Chronicles (1889)
- Gray Days and Gold (1889)
- Old Shrines and Ivy (1892)
- Wanders, the Poems of William Winters (1892)
- Shadows of the Stage (1892, 1893, and 1894)
- The Life and art of Edwin Booth (1893)
- The Life and Art of Joseph Jefferson (1894)
- Brown Heath and Blue Bells (1896)
- Ada Rehan (1898)
- Other Days of the Stage (1908)
- Old Friends (1909)
- Poems (1909), definitive author's edition
- Life and Art of Richard Mansfield (1910)
- The Wallet of Time (1913)
- a Life of Tyrone Power (1913)
- Shakespeare on the Stage (two series, 1911–1915)
- Vagrant Memories (1915)

He has edited, with memoirs and notes:

- The Poems of George Arnold (Boston, 1866)
- Life, Stories, and Poems of John Brougham (1881)
- The Poems and Stories of Fitz-James O'Brien (1881)
