= Elizabeth Campbell Winter =

- Born: December 19, 1841; Scotland
- Died: April 7, 1922; California
- Occupation: Writer
- Spouse: William Winter
- Children: William Jefferson Winter

Elizabeth Campbell Winter (December 19, 1841 – April 7, 1922) was an American actress and novelist. She published under her own name and the pen names Isabella Castelar, Elsie Snowe, and Blanche Myrtle.

Elizabeth Campbell was born on December 19, 1841 in Ederline, Loch Awe, Scotland, the daughter of John Campbell and Jessie Tulloch Campbell. Her family moved to Toronto, Canada when she was a child.

At the urging of Ada Clare, she moved to New York City in 1859 to pursue a writing career. She met her husband William Winter, literary critic of the Saturday Press, when she attempted to sell a short story to the publication. Her novels include The Spanish Treasure (1893), a lost race novel set in South America. The novel contains the first recorded use of the idiom "turn the air blue".

Her stage debut was at the Olympic Theatre in New York City on April 11, 1864. She was a student of Edwin Booth and starred as Katherine opposite Booth's Petruchio in The Taming of the Shrew at the Winter Garden in 1877. She retired from the stage the next year.

Elizabeth Campbell Winter died on 7 April 1922 in Los Angeles.

== Personal life ==
She married writer and dramatic critic William Winter in 1860. They had five children, including William Jefferson Winter, who married actress Elise Leslie.

== Bibliography ==
- The Curse of Dangerfield: Or, The Test of a Hundred Years (as Elsie Snow) N. L. Munro, 1883.
- The Spanish Treasure (as Isabella Castelar) New York: R Bonner's Sons, 1893
- A Girl's First Love (1905)
- Hawthorn Lodge
- The Mistress of the Grange
