= The Saturday Press =

The Saturday Press was the name of at least two periodicals:

- The Saturday Press (literary newspaper), a New-York based literary weekly newspaper that appeared from 1858 to 1860 and again from 1865 to 1866.
- The Saturday Press (Minneapolis), an allegedly anti-Semitic newspaper published in Minneapolis, Minnesota in 1927 and again from 1932 to 1936. Its forced closure was the subject of the Near v. Minnesota Supreme Court case.
