= Echemenes =

Echemenes was an Ancient Greek writer. He is mentioned by Athenaeus (xiii. p. 601) as the author of Κρητικἀ, from which a statement relating to the mythical history of Crete is quoted there.

Vossius (de Hist. Graec. p. 436, ed. Westerm.) proposes to read in Fulgentius (Mythol. i. 14), Echemenes for Euxemenes, who is there described as the author of Μνθολογονμενα, of which the first book is quoted. But this conjecture, according to Leonhard Schmitz, is without support.
