= New York Leader =

New York Leader may refer to:

- New York Leader (19th century), a New York City weekly literary newspaper from about 1855 to 1871
- New York Call, a daily socialist newspaper briefly renamed the New York Leader before its demise in 1923
