= Trish Halpin =

Magazine editor

- Born: c. 1967
- Education: University of Brighton
- Partner: Neil Cooper
- Children: 2 (twins)

Trish Halpin is the editor-in-chief of Marie Claire, who has previously edited Red, More! and New Woman magazines. She has received several awards from the British Society of Magazine Editors, in 2003, 2005, and 2013. Halpin is married, and has twins.

== Early and personal life ==
Halpin attended a Catholic school in North London and before going on to study English and Media at Brighton Polytechnic (now the University of Brighton). Whilst at Brighton Polytechnic, Halpin met her photographer husband-to-be, with whom she had twins Esme and Kit

== Career ==
Halpin's career originated at Construction News, before she moved to Screen International. At that time, she had "no ambition at all to work in magazines", and was not even thinking about being an editor.

Halpin's first post in publishing was doing classified adverts in administration.

Halpin has edited Red magazine, and deputy edited the More! and New Woman magazines. At More!, Halpin was hired by Marie O'Riordan, the editor she succeeded at Marie Claire, in a position of production editor. Halpin edited the United Kingdom edition of the InStyle magazine, a position she held since September 2006 until moving to Marie Claire in 2009; she was replaced at In Style by Eilidh MacAskill.

Halpin became the editor of Marie Claire on 2 February 2009, taking over from Marie O'Riordan. Whilst at Marie Claire, Halpin also launched the biannual magazine Marie Claire Runway.

=== Awards ===
Halpin has received the 'Editor of the year' award, given by the British Society of Magazine Editors, three times, in 2003, 2005, and 2013; at which she was awarded the 'Women's Brand – Monthly or Less Frequent' award.
