= New York Leader (19th century) =

The New York Leader (1855–1871) was a literary weekly newspaper published in New York City, and also the organ of city's political power, Tammany Hall.

Charles G. Halpine became part owner and principal editor of the paper in 1856. From 1861 until his death in 1864, it was edited by John Clancy. After The Saturday Press stopped publishing in 1860, a number of its former contributors wrote for the Leader, including Henry Clapp, Ada Clare, and other New York bohemians. Walt Whitman also contributed using the pseudonym "Velsor Brush".

The literary bent of the paper was in contrast to its political activities, but a decline in Tammany Hall's fortunes at the end of 1871 coincided with the paper's demise.
