= Nicholas John Halpin =

Nicholas John Halpin (1790–1850) was a cleric of the Church of Ireland, known as a writer.

== Life ==
Halpin was born 18 October 1790, at Portarlington. He graduated B.A. at Trinity College, Dublin in 1815, and took orders in the Church of Ireland.

Mainly involved with writing, Halpin was for many years editor of the Dublin Evening Mail. He was a permanent member of the Royal Irish Academy.

Halpin died at Dublin 22 November 1850.

== Works ==
Halpin wrote:

- An University Prize Poem, on His Majesty King George the Third having completed the Fiftieth Year of his Reign, Dublin, 1811.
- Tithes no Tax, Dublin, 1823.
- Authentic Report of the Speeches and Proceedings of the Meeting held at Cavan 26 January 1827, for the purpose of forming a Society for Promoting the Reformation, to which are added Notes and Appendix, edited Dublin, 1827.
- The Impossibility of Transubstantiation.
- No Chimæra, or the Lay Reformation in Ireland, Dublin, 1828.
- Oberon's Vision in the "Midsummer Night's Dream", illustrated by a comparison with Lylie's "Endymion", London, Shakespeare Society, 1843, an attempt to prove that Shakespeare was covertly referring to current events connected with Queen Elizabeth and Leicester.
- Bridal Runaway, an Essay on Juliet's Soliloquy, London, Shakespeare Society, 1845.
- The Dramatic Unities of Shakespeare, in a Letter addressed to the editor of "Blackwood's Edinburgh Magazine", Dublin, 1849.
- Observations on Certain Passages in the Life of Edmund Spenser, Dublin, 1850.

== Family ==
Halpin married Anne Grehan in 1817. She survived him, with three sons, including Charles Graham Halpin, and four daughters.

== Notes ==
Attribution

This article incorporates text from a publication now in the public domain: Stephen, Leslie; Lee, Sidney, eds. (1890). "Halpin, Nicholas John". Dictionary of National Biography. Vol. 24. London: Smith, Elder & Co.
