= The Wallet of Time =

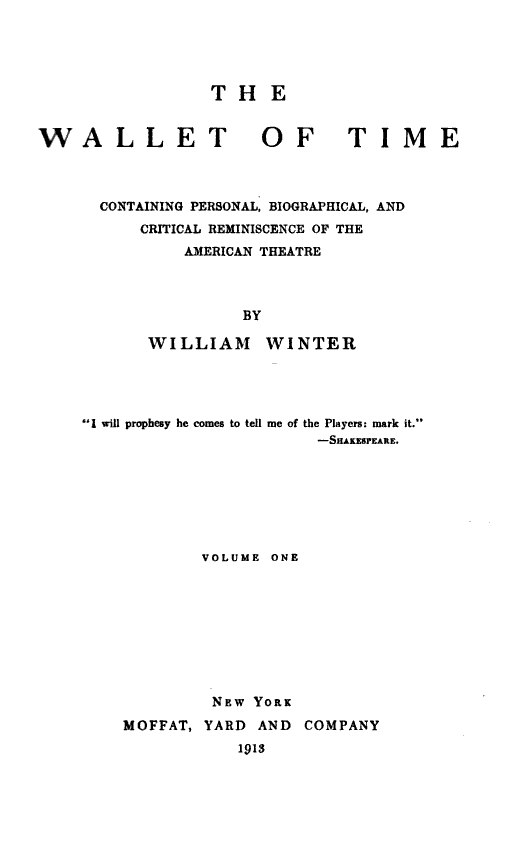
- The Wallet of Time Moffat, Yard and Company, 1913
- Author: William Winter
- Subject: Theater, Actors
- Publisher: Moffat, Yard and Company
- Publication date: 1913
- Publication place: United States
- Media type: Print
- OCLC: 1573717
- Dewey Decimal: 792.09
- LC Class: PN2285

The Wallet of Time is a publication by William Winter, published in two volumes in 1913.

== Overview ==
The book focuses on American stage actors and actresses, most of whom had been born in Europe, of the nineteenth century and the first decade of the twentieth century. The first volume, which is 668 pages long, includes thirty-three illustrations of actors and actresses. The work is of particular value to people who have an interest in or curiosity about stage actors of earlier times.

The book's title is taken from the words of William Shakespeare: "Time hath, my lord, a wallet at his back, Wherein he puts alms for oblivion..."

== Reception ==
The New York Times said, "Those who expect a history of the stage to be a geometrically divided affair, parceled out into neat periods, will perhaps find these two huge volumes unsatisfyingly formless. Mr. Winter has merely put together between the covers of this work those of his dramatic criticisms which, with the passing of the years, have proved of importance as reflecting the growth of the stage... There is no attempt to pigeonhole; the only classification is chronological, yet the chronicler-critic is well aware of tendencies, of the currents, and cross-currents in the forming art which he has assisted by a life of long and vigorous service."
