= Halpen =

Halpen is a surname. Notable people with the surname include:

- Klineman Halpen, fictional character from Doctor Who
- Patrick Halpen, Irish engraver

== See also ==
- Halpin
