= Dublin Evening Mail =

Newspaper in Ireland

The Dublin Evening Mail (renamed the Evening Mail in 1928) was one of Dublin's evening newspapers between 1823 and 1962.

== Origins ==
Launched in 1823, it proved to be the longest lasting evening paper in Ireland. The paper was an instant success, with first editor Joseph Timothy Haydn from Limerick seeing its readership hit 2,500 in a month, making it at that stage (when few could read, and the only people who bought papers were the gentry and aristocracy) the city's top seller. Its readership ebbed and flowed during the century. From the late 1860s until 1892 it was owned by a Dublin businessman called George Tickell. After Tickell's death, it was acquired by James Poole Maunsell, who had edited it in the early 1880s and was the son of a former proprietor, Dr Henry Maunsell. James Poole Maunsell died in 1897 and the paper was acquired by Lord Ardilaun and after his death in 1915 it was sold to a Cork businessman called Tivy.

During the Land War it took a strongly Conservative and pro-landlord position, denouncing Gladstone as an appeaser, comparing the Land League to the Mafia and the Colorado beetle, and demanding that Ireland be subjected to martial law.

Though it easily outsold rivals like the Dublin Evening Standard, its readership in 1900 was small compared to national papers such as the Evening Telegraph, which had 26,000 readers, The Irish Times which had 45,000, and the Freeman's Journal which had 40,000.

Historical copies of the Dublin Evening Mail, dating back to 1824, are available to search and view in digitised form at The British Newspaper Archive.

== 20th century challenges ==
Nevertheless, it managed to outlast both the Telegraph and the Freeman's Journal, but faced a far stiffer challenge in the mid 20th century from the nationwide-selling Evening Herald and Evening Press, though as late as the early 1950s it remained Dublin’s biggest selling evening newspaper.

== Bought, then closed, by The Irish Times ==
The Mail was bought by The Irish Times in its final few years. Having failed to turn the newspaper around, it had hoped to turn it into its own evening paper to rival the Irish Independent/Evening Herald and the Irish Press/Evening Press relationships, the Irish Times controversially closed the paper on 10 July 1962. Some of its staff and columns transferred directly over to The Irish Times.

== Printed on buff paper ==
The paper was published on distinctive buff (brownish yellow) paper in contrast to the pink paper of its rival, the Evening Telegraph.

== Links with Joyce, Stoker, Le Fanu ==
The Dublin Evening Mail featured in short stories in James Joyce's Dubliners. The Mail was once co-owned by author Sheridan Le Fanu, who also owned or part-owned The Warden, the Protestant Guardian, Evening Packet, and Dublin University Magazine. Bram Stoker worked as an unpaid theatre critic for the paper.

== Competition to select a national anthem ==
In June 1923, the Mail ran a competition to select an Irish national anthem (though Amhrán na bhFiann (The Soldiers Song) was used informally, it had not been adopted, and the W. T. Cosgrave's Executive Council was coming under pressure to choose an anthem to end confusion over whether to play Amhrán an BhFiann or God Save the King for the Irish Free State abroad. The paper appointed W. B. Yeats, Lennox Robinson and James Stephens to be the adjudicators, with a prize of fifty guineas on offer for the winning offer. However the adjudicators decided that none of the new compositions were of sufficient standard to win the fifty guineas. In 1928 the Free State finally adopted Amhrán na bhFiann as its anthem.

Publication dates

- 3 February 1823 — 1 February 1928 as the Dublin Evening Mail
- 2 February 1928 — 10 July 1962 as the Evening Mail.

== Trivia ==
Famed Irish American Brigadier General Charles Graham Halpine (1829-1868), known usually by his pseudonym Private Myles O' Reilly was the son of a longtime editor of the Dublin Evening Mail (who while editing was also serving as a Church of Ireland priest). Halpine was among other things the private secretary to P. T. Barnum, became a prominent journalist with the New York Times, a decorated soldier in the 69th New York Volunteer Infantry and in the Irish Brigade (where his letters, sent as "Private Myles O'Reilly", to the media defending the union became famous), and a key figure in the creation of the United States Army's first African American regiment. He finished his career as a crusader against local government corruption in New York, before accidentally chloroforming himself to death while trying to cure a severe headache.

== Footnotes ==
1. Some sources record the Dublin Evening Mail as having been founded in 1821. However, as the National Library of Ireland records the date as 1823 that date is being used in this article.

Patrick Maume “The Dublin Evening Mail and pro-landlord conservatism in the age of Gladstone and Parnell” Irish Historical Studies vol. XXXVII no. 148 (November 2011) pp550–566. Patrick Maume “’ This Proteus of politics’: The Dublin Evening Mail on Gladstone, 1868-98” in Mary Daly & Theo Hoppen (eds.) Gladstone: Ireland and Beyond (Dublin; Four Courts Press, 2011) pp102–121.
