= Dublin Evening Standard =

The Dublin Evening Standard was a short-lived Irish newspaper that was published from 10 January to 23 May 1870. In May 1870 the newspaper ceased publication. Its title was incorporated with its main evening rival, the Dublin Evening Mail.Little is known about its ownership. Copies of its editions are available on microfilm in the National Library of Ireland.
