= Thomas Powell (writer) =

English writer and fraudster

Thomas Powell (1809–1887) was an English writer and fraudster.

He was noted early for his prolific output and social charm, and he entertained a circle of notable authors at his home, often showing-off his skill at mimicking authors’ handwriting. But it became clear that he was putting this gift to criminal use, forging cheques and signatures, and he was repudiated by Charles Dickens (who likely based the character Uriah Heep on Powell), Robert Browning, and others. In 1849 he moved to New York to avoid prosecution, and many American publications printed an accusation by Dickens, which he was unable to substantiate and had to withdraw, settling with Powell out of court.

== Early career ==
By the age of 21, London-born Powell was contributing work to the literary Fraser’s Magazine, often using the pen name Pierce Pungent. He was a published poet, and his works included The Count de Foix, a Tale of the Olden Time, Poems, Dramatic Poems and Tales from Boccaccio. He also wrote plays including The Wife’s Revenge, The Blind Wife, Marguerite and The Shepherd’s Well. He entertained a literary circle at his home in Peckham, South London, that included writers such as Robert Browning, Leigh Hunt, and R.H. Horne.

In 1841, he was one of the contributors to the writing of The Poems of Geoffrey Chaucer Modernized; others involved with the project included Richard Henry Horne (editor), Elizabeth Barrett Browning, William Wordsworth, Leigh Hunt, Robert Bell, and Leonhard Schmitz. However, Powell later fell out of favour with his fellow authors. Horne wrote that Powell was “a dog he repudiates forever” and Robert Browning, in a letter of the same year (1846), warned Elizabeth Barrett Browning not to trust Powell as "his impudence and brazen insensibility are dreadful to encounter beyond all belief”.

== Charles Dickens ==
Powell was employed as a clerk in the shipping business of John Chapman & Co. of 2 Leadenhall Street in London. Charles Dickens was acquainted with the principal partners in the firm and asked them to find a position for his young brother Augustus Dickens. Powell acted as Augustus' mentor, earning the thanks and appreciation of Charles Dickens, who occasionally socialised and corresponded with Powell on friendly and informal terms.

== Forgery, embezzlement and fraud ==
For amusement, Powell showed off his ability to mimic his fellow authors' handwriting and signatures. He sold documents purported to be original letters and books inscribed by the authors, but some of these were thought to be forgeries and their authenticity was questioned. He also embezzled a large sum of money from John Chapman & Co., his employer, and when these activities were uncovered, he attempted suicide by taking an overdose of laudanum. In consideration of Powell’s family, the directors of John Chapman & Co. decided not to prosecute.

In 1848, Powell was again in trouble when a warrant was issued for his arrest for obtaining money with false cheques. He was released on bail and ordered to appear the next day in court. When he failed to attend, his solicitor informed the court that he was in an asylum, certified insane. The case was adjourned for two weeks, during which time the police discovered evidence of further fraud. At the next hearing in January 1849, the court was told that Powell “was in a lunatic asylum, raving mad”. The police informed the magistrate that Powell’s symptoms were probably temporary, having been induced by the use of opium and charcoal burnt in the defendant’s bedroom.

== Move to America ==
Powell escaped prosecution by moving to America with his wife and four children, arriving in New York on May 26, 1849, on board the Silas Richard. Within six months of arriving, Powell had his book The Living Authors of England published. One of the 38 authors featured in the book was Charles Dickens, and he was not amused by what Powell had written. One item that seemed to have annoyed him was the assertion that he had based the character of Paul Dombey (Dombey and Son) on Thomas Chapman, one of the principal partners at John Chapman & Co. Dickens immediately fired off a letter to Lewis Gaylord Clark, editor of the New York literary magazine The Knickerbocker, saying that Powell was a forger and thief. Clark published the letter in the New-York Tribune and several other papers picked up on the story. Powell started proceedings to sue these publications, and Clark was arrested. Dickens, realising that he had acted in haste, contacted John Chapman & Co. to seek written confirmation of Powell’s guilt. Dickens did receive a reply from John Chapman & Co. confirming Powell's embezzlement, but once the directors realised that this information might have to be produced in court they refused to make further disclosures. Owing to the difficulties of providing evidence in America to support his accusations, Dickens eventually made a private settlement with Powell out of court.

While all this was in progress, Powell was arrested in New York for passing a forged draft for £250 from John Allan, who was another partner at John Chapman & Co. Owing to a lack of evidence, Powell was released without charge.

== Editor and newspaperman ==
Although Powell's reputation had been sullied, he still made a successful career of writing and editing newspapers and periodicals, often working for Frank Leslie. Titles that Powell worked on included: Figaro!; The Lantern; The Reveille and Review; Hudson County Democrat; New York Daily News and Frank Leslie's: Illustrated Newspaper; New Family Magazine and Budget of Fun. In 1886/1887, a series of articles written by Powell called Leaves of my Life were published in Frank Leslie's Sunday Magazine. These would be his final works and included a portrait of Powell in Volume 21.

Thomas Butler Gunn, illustrator and writer, worked for Powell during the 1850s and wrote about him in his diaries. He believed that Dickens had based the character of Uriah Heep on Powell, saying that he resembled him both physically and in his mannerisms. Gunn’s less-than-complimentary description of Powell goes on:

He is very familiar in conversation, and his speech has a sort of orotund unctuousness of accent which, in conjunction with his implied knowledge of every-body, might easily gull people into the belief that he was rather a witty man of the world than otherwise. He is a great mischief-maker and back-biter, and inherently a dodger.

== Family ==
Details of Powell’s early life are vague although his death certificate indicates that his father’s first name was also Thomas. In 1836, Powell married Frances (Fannie) Maria Machell, the daughter of Charles and Martha Maria Machell. Their other daughter, Eliza Mary, married the historian Leonhard Schmitz.

Powell’s eldest son, William Frances (Frank), joined his father in the newsprint industry as an engraver. He served in the 9th Regiment, New York Infantry during the Civil War, first as a sergeant and then the first lieutenant.

Powell’s wife died in 1872, and he died of Bright's disease in 1887 at his daughter’s home in New Jersey.
