= Bernard Connolly (politician) =

American politician

Member of the New Jersey General Assembly from the Monmouth County district
- In office 1851 Serving with William H. Conover, Samuel W. Jones, Garret S. Smock

Personal details
- Born: December 1804 Princeton, New Jersey, U.S.
- Died: June 9, 1880 (aged 75) Long Branch, New Jersey, U.S.
- Party: Democratic (c1825–56); Republican (1856–72); Liberal Republican (1872); Democratic (1872–80)
- Spouse: Hannah Ann Downie
- Profession: Newspaper editor, politician

Bernard Connolly (December 1804 – June 9, 1880) was an American newspaperman, politician and writer who lived in Freehold, New Jersey.

As a boy in Westmoreland County, Pennsylvania, Connolly learned the printing business at the Westmoreland Republican, becoming proficient in both newspaper and book printing. At 21, he moved to Princeton, New Jersey, where he entered into a partnership in a printing house already in business there. While living in Princeton he married Hannah Ann Downie.

In 1834 he moved to Freehold, where he founded a weekly newspaper, the Monmouth Democrat, with an editorial policy supporting Jacksonian democracy. This quickly became the most successful newspaper circulating in Monmouth County at the time. Connolly was proprietor of the Democrat until January 1854, when he sold the business.

== Political career ==
A loyal Democrat, Connolly worked hard for many years to promote the party. In 1844, as a candidate for delegate to the state constitutional convention, he successfully opposed proposals for equal representation of Whig and Democrat delegates. Monmouth County then elected a delegation consisting solely of Democrats, which tipped the majority at the convention to that party.

In the 1850 general election, Connolly was elected as a Democrat to the New Jersey General Assembly, and served during the 1851 Session. During the Pierce Administration he held a position in the New York Custom House.

In 1856, with the new Republican Party appearing on the national scene, Connelly changed his party affiliation and supported John C. Frémont for President. Frémont's running mate, William L. Dayton, was a former resident of Freehold. In the 1858 general election, Connelly was again a candidate for Assembly, this time as a Republican running under the Opposition Party designation; he lost to Democrat Austin H. Patterson. The following year he was an unsuccessful candidate for Sheriff of Monmouth County.

In 1872, Connelly joined the Liberal Republican Party and supported its presidential candidate, Horace Greeley. After Greeley's loss to President Ulysses S. Grant, and subsequent death, the Liberal Republican Party dissolved; Connelly then returned to the Democratic Party and remained a Democrat until his death in 1880.

== Later years and death ==
After retiring from politics, Connelly returned to writing, providing the biographical sketches for Woolman & Rose's Historical & Biographical Atlas of the New Jersey Coast in 1878. In the fall of 1879 he moved in with his daughter in New Utrecht, New York, now a part of Brooklyn. In 1880, in failing health, he thought a visit to his son in Long Branch would be helpful. While there, he died of heart disease on June 9, 1880.
