= Eugene Davis (writer) =

Eugene Davis (23 March 1857 - 25 November 1897) was an Irish writer, journalist, poet and nationalist, who wrote Souvenirs of Irish Footprints Over Europe.

== Early life ==
Eugene Davis was born in Clonakilty, County Cork on 23 March 1857. His parents were John and Ellen Davis (née Murphy). His father was a private tutor, who taught classics to the children of the local gentry. He was their only son, and had one stepbrother and 3 stepsisters from his father's first marriage. His stepbrother was Fr Charles Davis (1829–92), who was briefly involved in the fishing industry in County Cork. He was educated by his father, who wished for him to also become a priest. He studied divinity at the Irish Colleges of Leuven and Paris from 1878 to 1880, but did not enter the priesthood. Instead he began to write under the pen-name "Owen Roe".

== Career ==
Between 1876 and 1880 he was published in the Shamrock, almost weekly, writing about Irish history and poetry as well as his own poems and a number of romantic poems translated from German and French. The widow of John Keegan Casey, Mary Casey, commissioned Davis to write a biography of her husband, Reliques of John K. Casey (1878), which also included unpublished articles and poems. After leaving the Irish College in Paris in 1880, Davis began submitting fiction and verse to the Irishman, eventually joining the staff of United Ireland. He remained in Paris, living at Hôtel Bacqué 338 rue St Honoré. During the suppression of United Ireland in late 1881, Davis edited a Parisian edition of the paper underground for 6 weeks at the request of Patrick Egan. He was then recruited by James Stephens, the retired founder of the Irish Republican Brotherhood, to arrange and edit his memoirs for publication in the Irishman from February to June 1882, and Weekly Freeman from October 1883 to February 1884.

Davis unknowingly became associated with a number of British agents and spies in 1883 during the time he was connected to the New York newspaper, United Irishman. This led to both him and Stephens being expelled from France in February 1885. Davis then travelled Europe, and contributed to the Boston Pilot and the San Francisco Chronicle for the next 18 months. This period of travel was the basis for his 1889 travel book and history of the Irish in Europe, Souvenirs of Irish Footprints Over Europe. Among the stories he related about the Irish in Europe included the tale of an Irish man from Waterford who was sown into a bear suit and exhibited in France, a ruse that was uncovered by an Irish speaking priest who recognised the language the supposed bear was speaking in distress.

From 1886 to 1887, he wrote long form articles about Ireland for the Parisian La Nouvelle Revue. In early 1887 he was given permission to return to France, where he was offered a position as an editor of a new, bilingual Irish nationalist newspaper based in Paris by James MacAdaras, but this paper was never established.

In the summer of 1887, Davis moved to Dublin joining the Nation as the literary editor, also publishing poetry in United Ireland. There he became friends with Michael MacDonagh. Davis provided Michael Davitt with intelligence about the activities of Richard Pigott in Paris in January 1889, which aided in the exposé of his duplicitous actions before the Times special commission. In the late 1880s, he spoke widely in Ireland to groups including the Pan-Celtic Literary Society. Alongside his 1889 volume of poetry, Davis published poems in Dublin University Review (April 1886) and Lays and lyrics of the Pan-Celtic Society (1889).

== Later life ==
Davis left for the United States after the Nation closed in July 1891, going on to publish with a number of literary magazine there and the Chicago Citizen. He went on to be appointed an editor to the Boston Pilot. He married in June 1891. She was a widow, and daughter of Charles G. Halpine. They had 2 daughters. The family lived in Brooklyn, New York, and Davis died there 25 November 1897.

His 1889 Souvenirs of Irish Footprints Over Europe was republished by UCD Press in 2006.

== Selected works ==
- Reliques of John K. Casey (1878)
- Souvenirs of Irish Footprints Over Europe (1889)
- The Poetical Works of Eugene Davis (1889)
- A Vision of Ireland and Other Poems (1889)
