= Ronald Halpin =

Canadian public servant and diplomat

- Occupations: public servant, diplomat
- Years active: 1975–present
- Spouse: Françoise Halpin (née Lacasse)

Ronald Halpin is a Canadian public servant and diplomat. He is Canada's ambassador to Hungary. He has also served as ambassador to Slovakia.

Halpin earned a Bachelor of Arts, Honours at the Royal Military College of Canada in 1971. He served a number of years of military service, including peacekeeper duties in Cyprus. He suffered a severe stroke on November 14, 2003, while he was Ambassador to the Republic of Hungary.

Title	Location	Years
Foreign Affairs Officer, Canadian Department of Foreign Affairs. Throughout his career, he has specialized on Central, East and South European affairs.	Ottawa, Ontario and various external assignments	1975–present
Canada's Ambassador to the Republic of Hungary, with concurrent accreditation to the Republic of Slovenia.	Republic of Hungary, Republic of Slovenia.	2003–2005
Director General of the Central, East and South Europe Bureau.	Ottawa, Ontario	2000-2007
Ambassador to the Czech Republic and Slovakia	Prague, Czech Republic	1997 to 2000
Director General, Resource Planning and Management Bureau	Ottawa, Ontario	1995 to 1997
Senior Adviser for Security and Counterterrorism	Ottawa, Ontario	1992 to 1995

He served as a foreign affairs officer in Canadian embassies in Pretoria, Moscow and Warsaw. He also served as a foreign affairs officer in External Affairs Headquarters, Political and Strategic Analysis Division, the USSR and Eastern Europe Relations Division and the Personnel Division.

Halpin is married to Françoise Halpin (née Lacasse) and they have two children.
