= David Halpin =

Professor David Halpin
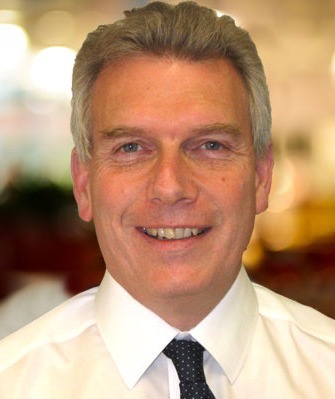
- Prof. David Halpin
- Born: 1960 (age 65–66); Liverpool
- Citizenship: British
- Education: University of Oxford; St Thomas's Hospital Medical School
- Known for: Respiratory research and guideline development
- Awards: Fellow of the European Respiratory Society
- Website: https://experts.exeter.ac.uk/36909-david-halpin/about

Professor David Michael George Halpin MA DPhil MB BS FRCP FERS (born 12 February 1960) is a British respiratory scientist and clinician, a specialist in the mechanisms and treatment of chronic obstructive pulmonary disease (COPD) and asthma. He is Honorary Professor of Respiratory Medicine at the University of Exeter and Professor of Respiratory Medicine at the Observational and Pragmatic Research Institute (OPRI) in Singapore.

== Early life ==
Halpin was born in Liverpool and went to school at The Liverpool Bluecoat School. He won an open scholarship to Brasenose College Oxford, where he graduated with a BA in Physiological Sciences (first-class honours) in 1981. He stayed at Brasenose College and was awarded an MRC scholarship to undertake postgraduate research in the Department of Human Anatomy at Oxford University leading to a DPhil in 1983. After this he moved to the St Thomas's Hospital Medical School in London where he was a University Scholar and graduated MB BS in 1986.

== Medical career ==
After qualifying in medicine, he undertook initial clinical training at St Thomas Hospital, London and the Royal Devon & Exeter Hospital, Exeter, followed by posts in London at Brompton Hospital, National Hospital for Nervous Diseases, Queen Square, London and Royal Postgraduate Medical School, Hammersmith Hospital and the Intensive Therapy Unit (Mead Ward) at St Thomas Hospital.

He completed his clinical training in respiratory medicine as a senior registrar at The Brompton Hospital and at the Westminster Hospital in 1994 was appointed consultant physician at the Royal Devon & Exeter Hospital and senior lecturer at University of Exeter Medical School. He became Honorary Professor of Respiratory Medicine at the University of Exeter in 2011, and Professor of Respiratory Medicine at the Observational and Pragmatic Research Institute (OPRI) in Singapore in 2018. He was Clinical Lead for the Respiratory Department in Exeter for 13 years, overseeing the growth in its clinical and research activity.

He is a Fellow of Royal College Physicians, and a Member of the British Thoracic Society (BTS), European Respiratory Society (ERS), The International Union Against Tuberculosis and Lung Disease (The Union), American College of Chest Physicians (CHEST) & American Thoracic Society (ATS).

== Research ==
His research is focussed on clinical aspects epidemiology and management of COPD and asthma. He has led studies on the pharmacological treatment of asthma and COPD, including the effects of long acting-bronchodilators, inhaled corticosteroids and biologic therapies. He has also had a longstanding interests in the role of palliative care for patients with COPD and the role of psychological factors in COPD and asthma.

== Publications ==
Halpin is the author of over 300 publications in peer-reviewed journals and has written nearly 20 books or chapters in books. His h-index is 61 with over 23,000 citations.

He was an Associate Editor of Thorax and is on the editorial board of American Journal of Respiratory & Critical Care Medicine as well as several other journals and is a peer reviewer for many others.

== External activities ==
Halpin is a member of the Board of Directors of the Global Initiative for Chronic Obstructive Lung Diseases (GOLD) and of the GOLD Science Committee. He was the Chairman and Clinical Expert for the COPD Guideline Development Group of the National Institute of Clinical Excellence (NICE) in the UK. He has also chaired other NICE Guideline Development Groups and contributed to Health Technology Assessments (HTAs).

He sits on the Steering Committee of the WHO convened Global Alliance against Chronic Respiratory Diseases (GARD), and on the Executive Board of the Forum of International Respiratory Societies (FIRS).

He frequently gives presentations on COPD and asthma at lectures and meetings around the world.

He also sits as a judge on the First Tier Tribunal, Social Entitlement Chamber, for the Ministry of Justice in the UK.
