= More! =

Defunct women weekly fashion magazine

- Editor: Chantelle Horton
- Categories: fashion, women's lifestyle
- Frequency: Fortnightly (weekly from 2007)
- Publisher: Bauer Verlagsgruppe
- Founded: 1988; 37 years ago
- Final issue: 2013; 12 years ago
- Country: United Kingdom
- Based in: London
- Language: British English

More! was a fortnightly, later weekly, women's fashion magazine and associated website published on Tuesdays in the United Kingdom by Bauer London Lifestyle. It included celebrity news, high street fashion, and sex tips. The magazine was published fortnightly until September 2007, when it became a weekly publication to compete with Look. More USA is still published.

On 22 April 2013, Bauer Media Group announced that it would cease publication of More! magazine and its website. In its closing web comments, the publisher reported that continuing challenging economic conditions meant that the product was no longer viable.

== History and profile ==
More! magazine was launched in 1988, aimed at older teenage girls. In 2002, it was relaunched as a lifestyle magazine for young women.

The ABC in August 2009 revealed a 17.3% growth of year-on-year circulation, making More! the UK's fastest-growing glossy celeb weekly.

The magazine launched its own annual fashion awards in 2004.

Also in 2009, the magazine sponsored The City when it was shown on MTV.

== Circulation ==
According to the ABC, the magazine had an average net circulation of 188,265 from July to December 2010.

Period	Average net circulation (data)	Change year-on-year
Jan-Jun 2010	187,159	_
Jul-Dec 2010	188,265	_
Jan-Jun 2011	170,033	−9.7%

== Content ==
The content of More! magazine was divided into sections: "celebs", "fashion and beauty", "men and relationships" and "every week".

The fashion content in the magazine had an emphasis on affordable high street clothing - items from Primark, New Look and similar chains were often featured.

Regular features included:

- Look what we bought - the magazine travel to a different UK shopping centre each week and ask women in the target audience to change into new clothes which they've just bought
- The big question - 40 men are asked the same question, such as "What's the cutest thing your girlfriend does?" and "What was the last text you sent?"
- Rehab - advice from experts about health, relationships and careers
- Position of the week - each week a different sex position was illustrated

== Staff ==
Position	Person
Editor	Chantelle Horton
Deputy Editor	Louise Burke
News and Entertainment Director	Leigh Purves
Features Editor	Louise Ward
Executive Style Director	Sophie Stevens
Art Director	Daniel Knight
Picture Director	Tijen Denizmen
Production Editor	Rebecca Morten
