= Leonhard Schmitz =

German-born British classicist (1807–1890)

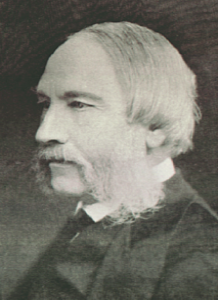
Leonhard Schmitz, PhD, LLD.

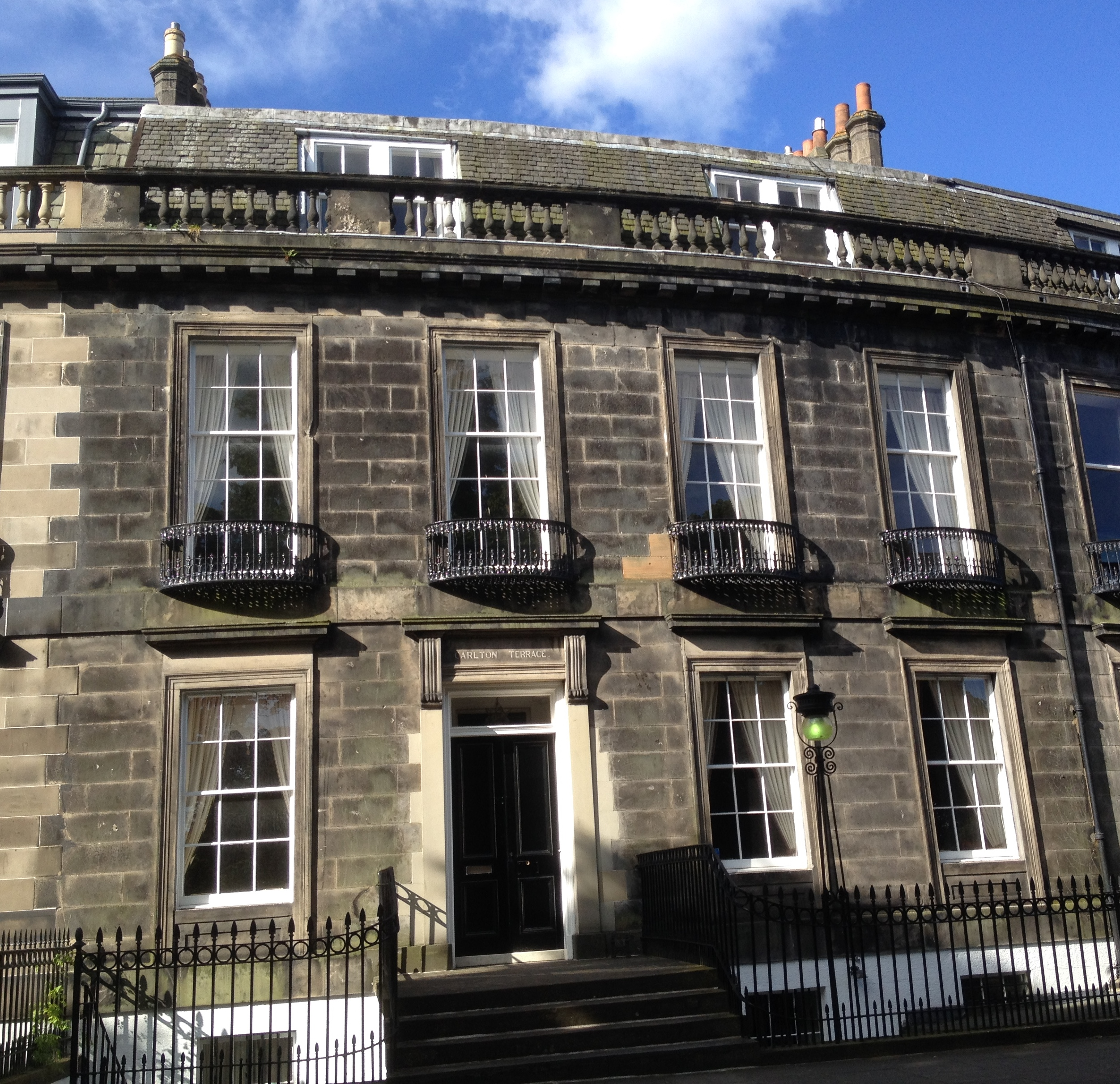
11 Carlton Terrace

Leonhard Schmitz FRSE (1807 – May 1890) was a Prussian-born classical scholar and educational author, mainly active in the United Kingdom. He is sometimes referred to in the Anglicised version of his name Leonard Schmitz.

== Biography ==
Schmitz was born in Eupen in what was then the Kingdom of Prussia (now in Belgium).

He attended gymnasium in Aix-la-Chappelle to the east (now called Aachen and within modern day Germany). He lost his right arm in an accident at the age of 10, but nonetheless excelled academically. He studied at the University of Bonn, where he earned a PhD, and was in particular influenced by Barthold Georg Niebuhr; Schmitz later published in England a collection of notes taken from Niebuhr's lectures as Lectures on Roman History (1844).

He became associated with a number of scholars there, writing many of the mythological entries for classicist William Smith's Dictionary of Greek and Roman Biography and Mythology, and serving as "a key figure in the transmission of German classical scholarship to Victorian Britain".

Schmitz moved to Scotland in 1846 to serve as rector of the Royal High School in Edinburgh from that year until 1866. He lived at 11 Carlton Terrace on Calton Hill very close to the school.

He was elected a Fellow of the Royal Society of Edinburgh in 1846 his proposer being James Pillans.

In his induction speech he expressed the hope that his appointment would be "the means of strengthening and increasing the intellectual sympathy which has so long existed between this country and Germany". In that office in 1859 he also tutored The Prince of Wales in Roman history.

Schmitz moved back to England in 1866, serving as Principal of London International College from 1866 to 1874, and Classical Examiner at the University of London from 1874 to 1884. He was granted a civil list pension of £50 in 1881, doubled in 1886.

== Family ==
He married an English woman, Eliza Mary Machell, and moved to England in 1837; around 1840 they had a daughter, Leonora Schmitz, who would become a noted music critic.

== Works ==
- A Grammar of the Latin Language (1845) with Karl Gottlob Zumpt.
- Grammar of the Latin language (1849)
- The History of Rome (1851) co-author
- Lectures on Ancient History (1852)
- Lectures on the History of Rome (1852)
- Elementary Latin Grammar and Exercise (1852)
- Lectures on Ancient Ethnography and Geography (1854)
- A Manual of Ancient Geography (1857)
- The Ancient History of Herodotus (1859)
- Biographies of Eminent Soldiers of the Last Four Centuries (1865)
- A grammar of the Latin language for middle and higher Class Schools (1876)
- A History of England for Junior Classes (1877)
- A History of Latin Literature (1877)
- A Practical Grammar of the German Language (1876)
- Putnam's Short School Histories (1876): England + Germany + Greece + Rome
- Introductory grammar of the Latin language (1880)
