= Halpenny =

Halpenny is a surname. Notable people with the surname include:

- Baron Barrymore Halpenny, English commercial artist, book editor, writer and historian of traditions and culture
- Bruce Barrymore Halpenny, English military historian and author
- Colum Halpenny (born 1979), Australian-Irish rugby league footballer
- Ellen Halpenny (born 1990), New Zealand netball player in the ANZ Championship
- Francess Halpenny, CC, FRSC (born 1919), Canadian editor and professor
- Ernest Halpenny, PC (1903–1974), Canadian politician
- Marion Rose Halpenny, English equestrian writer and horsewoman
- William Halpenny (1882–1960), Canadian track and field athlete
