= Monmouth Democrat =

Newspaper published in New Jersey (1834–1942)

- Type: Weekly
- Founder: Bernard Connolly
- Founded: April 12, 1834
- Ceased publication: November 26, 1942
- Headquarters: Freehold Borough, New Jersey

The Monmouth Democrat was a weekly newspaper published in Freehold Borough, New Jersey, from 1834 to 1942.

The Democrat was founded by Bernard Connolly, who editorially supported the Jacksonian democracy and President Andrew Jackson's efforts to dissolve the National Bank. The first issue of the paper was published on April 12, 1834, in Princeton; Connolly relocated the print shop to Freehold in July of that year.

In 1854, Connolly sold the Democrat to Colonel James Sterling Yard, publisher of the Village Record in Hightstown, New Jersey. While sharing Connolly's Democratic views, Yard placed a greater focus on local news. The newspaper diverged from the Democratic Party upon the outbreak of the Civil War, becoming one of the first in the state to call for the rebellion to be put down.

The newspaper remained in the ownership of the Yard family for the rest of its existence. In its final years, the family sought to sell the paper as advertising revenues declined. By the end, it had been reduced to only two employees and one assistant. The entry of the United States into World War II and the resulting "lack of help in the mechanical department" made it impossible for the newspaper to continue. The final issue of the Democrat was printed on November 26, 1942.
