= Pfaff's =

Mid-19th century bar and bohemian hangout in New York City

Coordinates: 40.72675°N 73.99580°W

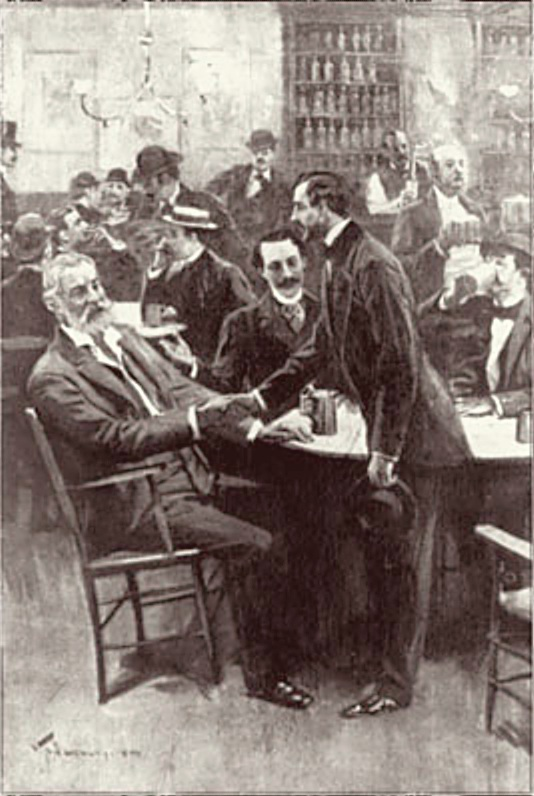
Pfaff's beer cellar in 1857. Depicted seated is Walt Whitman.

Pfaff's was a drinking establishment in Manhattan, New York City, known for its literary and artistic clientele.

== Description ==
Opened in 1855 by Charles Ignatious Pfaff, the original Pfaff's was modeled after the German Rathskellers that were popular in Europe at the time. Charles Pfaff's beer cellar was located on Broadway near Bleecker Street (before 1862, Pfaff's address was given as 647 Broadway; after 1865, its location was advertised as 653 Broadway) in Greenwich Village, New York City. To enter the beer cellar—which was actually a vaulted ceiling bar and restaurant—its patrons had to go down a set of stairs.

From the mid-1850s to the late 1860s, Pfaff's was the center of New York's revolutionary culture. As writer Allan Gurganus has said, "Pfaff’s was the Andy Warhol factory, the Studio 54, the Algonquin Round Table all rolled into one."

Habitués included journalist and social critic Henry Clapp, Jr., Walt Whitman, author and actress Ada Clare, poet and actress Adah Isaacs Menken, playwright John Brougham, artist Elihu Vedder, pianist and composer Louis Moreau Gottschalk (who also had an affair with Ada Clare), actor Edwin Booth, author Fitz Hugh Ludlow, and humorist Artemus Ward. Whitman called Charlie Pfaff "a generous German restaurateur, silent, stout, jolly," as well as "the best selector of champagne in America." Whitman also wrote an unfinished poem about Pfaff's called "The Two Vaults," which included the lines:

...The vault at Pfaffs where the drinkers and laughers meet to eat and drink and carouse
While on the walk immediately overhead pass the myriad feet of Broadway...

Writer Fitz James O'Brien also wrote an ode to Pfaff's and to the clientele; an annotated copy of these lyrics titled At Pfaff's was pasted by Thomas Butler Gunn into his 1860 diary and can be seen at The Vault at Pfaff's website.

Clapp, considered by many the "King of Bohemia", founded The Saturday Press as New York's answer to the Atlantic Monthly. Started as a literary magazine, The Saturday Press eventually became a countercultural zine "with a mix of poetry, stories, radical politics, and an enthusiastic spirit of personal freedom and sexual openness. Before it folded in 1868, it published numerous poems by Whitman and a short story by Mark Twain. The Saturday Press championed Leaves of Grass, a move that many view as a significant factor in the success of the 1860 edition."

In 1870, Charles Pfaff moved his business up to midtown. Whitman wrote about Pfaff's in Specimen Days after a visit to the restaurateur's newer location many years later:

An hour’s fresh stimulation, coming down ten miles of Manhattan Island by railroad and 8 o’clock stage. Then an excellent breakfast at Pfaff’s restaurant, 24th Street. Our host himself, an old friend of mine, quickly appear’d on the scene to welcome me and bring up the news, and, first opening a big fat bottle of the best wine in the cellar, talk about ante-bellum times, '59 and '60, and the jovial suppers at his Broadway place, near Bleecker Street.

Ah, the friends and names and frequenters, those times, that place. Most are dead - Ada Clare, Wilkins, Daisy Sheppard, O’Brien, Henry Clapp, Stanley, Mullin, Wood, Brougham, Arnold - all gone.

And there Pfaff and I, sitting opposite each other at the little table, gave a remembrance to them in a style they would have themselves fully confirm’d, namely, big, brimming, fill’d-up champagne-glasses, drain’d in abstracted silence, very leisurely, to the last drop."

== Current status ==
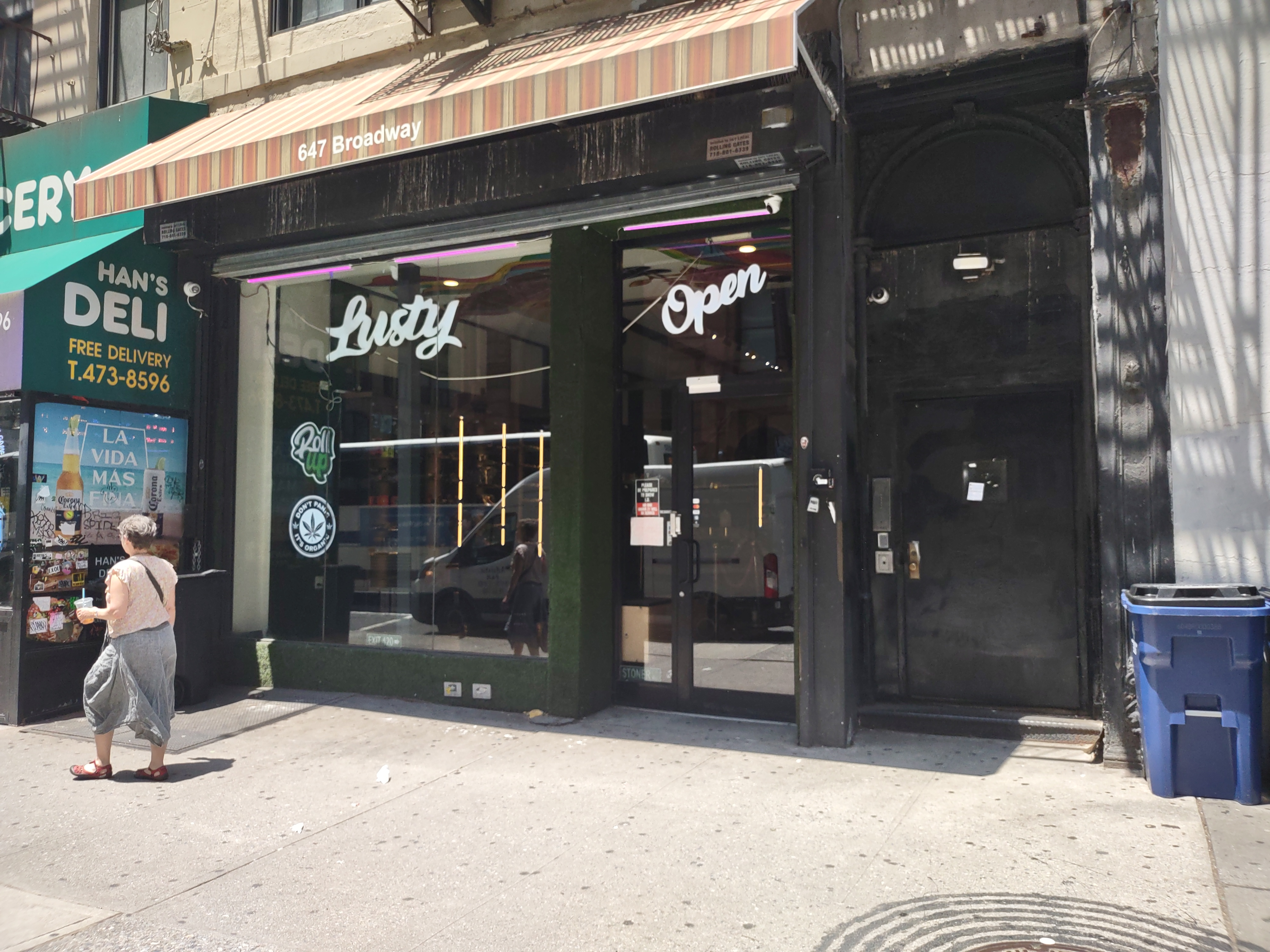
647 Broadway in 2025

The original location at 653 Broadway eventually became an envelope factory. In 1975, it became a disco called Infinity, which was destroyed by fire in 1979. Today, the location is home to a few shops.

In the spring of 2011, a restaurant and bar using the name The Vault at Pfaff's opened at 643 Broadway, near the original Pfaff's location. It too was accessed by descending a set of stairs, which led into a refurbished cellar. The Vault at Pfaff's has since closed. However, in 2024 a new establishment opened, Delmonico's sister establishment TUCCI- New York by Max Tucci. The restaurant serves modern Italian cuisine in an elegant atmosphere with hints of Gilded Age days.
