= Frank Bellew =

American journalist

Frank Henry Temple Bellew (April 18, 1828 – June 29, 1888), American artist, illustrator, and cartoonist.

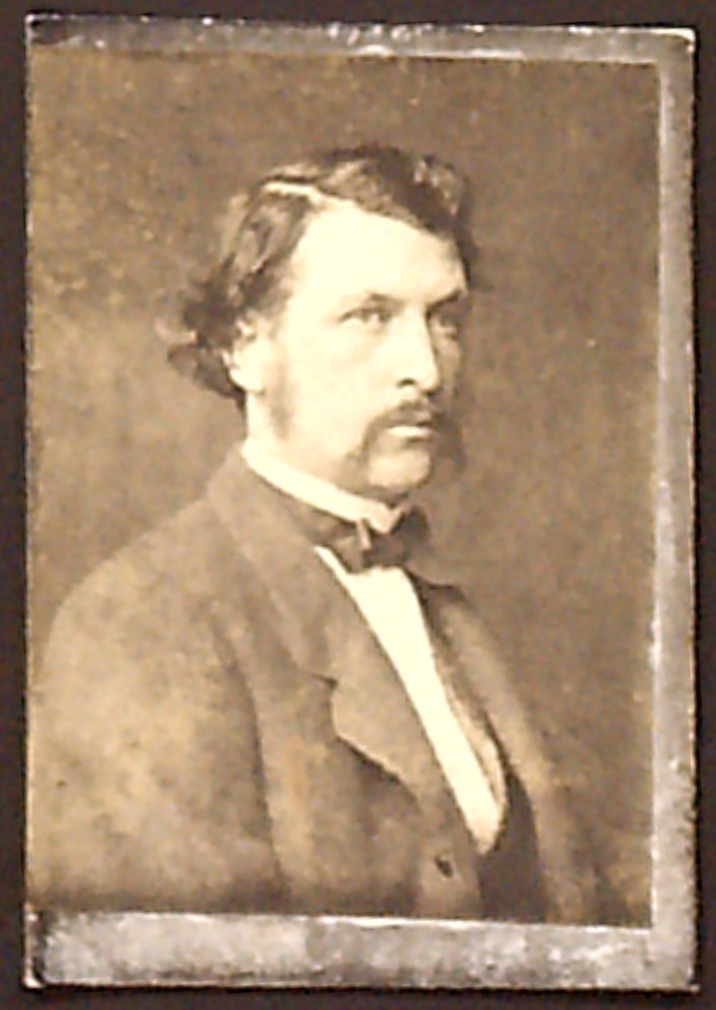
Frank Bellew ca. 1859

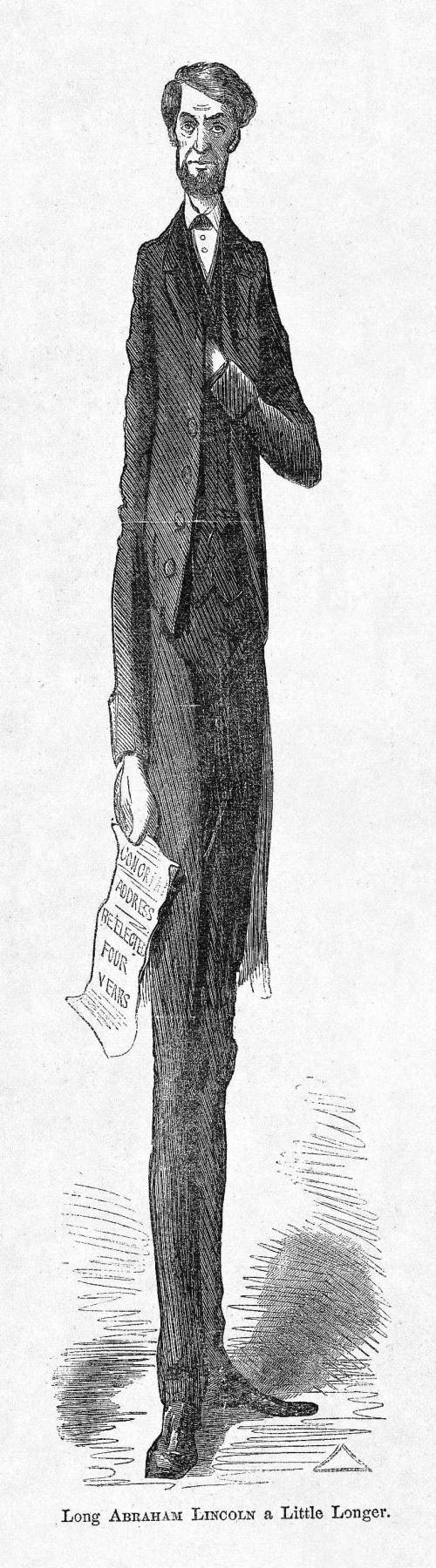
"Long Abraham Lincoln a Little Longer"

== Personal ==
Bellew was born in India, in 1828 as the child of an Irish captain and his British wife. He died on June 29, 1888, at his daughter's home in New York.

He had two children, one a daughter, and a son, Frank P.W. Bellew, who signed his work "Chip," as in "chip off the old block." Bellew Avenue Road in Parade locality of Kanpur is named after Frank.

== Career ==
Bellew drew for most of the notable publications of his time, including Frank Leslie's Illustrated, Harper's Monthly, Harper's Weekly, Harper's Bazaar, St.Nicholas, and humor magazines such as The Lantern, The New York Picayune, Vanity Fair (US, 1859-1863), The Funniest of Phun, Wild Oats, Puck, Judge, and the comic Life.

Bellew came to New York from England in 1850 and worked in the city his entire career. In 1931 Time magazine credited Bellew with having drawn the first Uncle Sam for a cartoon in an 1852 issue of The Lantern. This claim was discredited by Alton Ketchum in his book Uncle Sam: The Man and the Legend (Hill and Wang, 1959), in which he traced the first depiction of Uncle Sam back to a cartoon in 1832.

Bellew's November 26, 1864, Harper's Weekly caricature of Abraham Lincoln, "Long Abraham Lincoln a Little Longer," exaggerating the height and thinness of the president to absurd extremes, was popular.

== Friendships ==
Because his wife's family lived briefly in Concord, Massachusetts, Bellew knew and socialized with Ralph Waldo Emerson and Henry David Thoreau, who visited Bellew once at his studio on Broadway in New York City.

Thoreau and Bellew discussed philosophical matters, as Thoreau recorded in his Journals on October 19, 1855:

Talking with Bellew this evening about Fourierism and communities, I said that I suspected any enterprise in which two were engaged together. "But," said he, "it is difficult to make a stick stand unless you slant two or more against it." "Oh, no," answered I, "you may split its lower end into three, or drive it single into the ground, which is the best way; but most men, when they start on a new enterprise, not only figuratively, but really, pull up stakes. When the sticks prop one another, none, or only one, stands erect."

== Bibliography ==
- Bellew, Frank. The Art Of Amusing: A Collection Of Graceful Arts, Games, Tricks, Puzzles, and Charades. New York: G.W. Carleton and Co., 1866.
- Bellew, Frank. A Bad Boy's First Reader. New York: G.W. Carleton and Co., 1881. (NOTE: This is a reprint of That Comic Primer)
- Bellew, Frank. "Emerson and Walt Whitman," Lippincott's Magazine, June 24, 1884.
- Bellew, Frank. Jeff Petticoats. New York: Intagliotype and Graphotype Co., c. 1866.
- Bellew, Frank, ed. Joe Miller's Jests With Copious Editions. New York: Office of the Northern Magazine, 1865.
- Bellew, Frank. That Charming Evening: A Volume Intended To Amuse Everybody and Enable All To Amuse Everybody Else: Thus Bringing About As Near an Approximation To the Millennium As Can Be Conveniently Attained In the Compass Of One Small Volume. New York: G.W. Carleton and Co., 1878. (NOTE: This is a reprint of The Art of Amusing)
- Bellew, Frank. That Comic Primer. New York: G.W. Carleton and Co., 1877.
- Bellew, Frank, ed. The Tramp: His Tricks, Tallies and Tell-tales, With All His Signs, Countersigns, Grips, Pass-words and Villainies Exposed. New York: Dick & Fitzgerald, 1878.
- Harte, F. Bret. Illustrated by Frank Bellew. Condensed Novels and Other Papers. New York: G.W. Carleton, 1867. (The first book published by Bret Harte).
- Smith, Kristen M., ed. The Lines Are Drawn: Political Cartoons of the Civil War. Athens, Georgia: Hill Street Press, c. 1999.
