= Charles G. Halpine =

Irish journalist, author and soldier

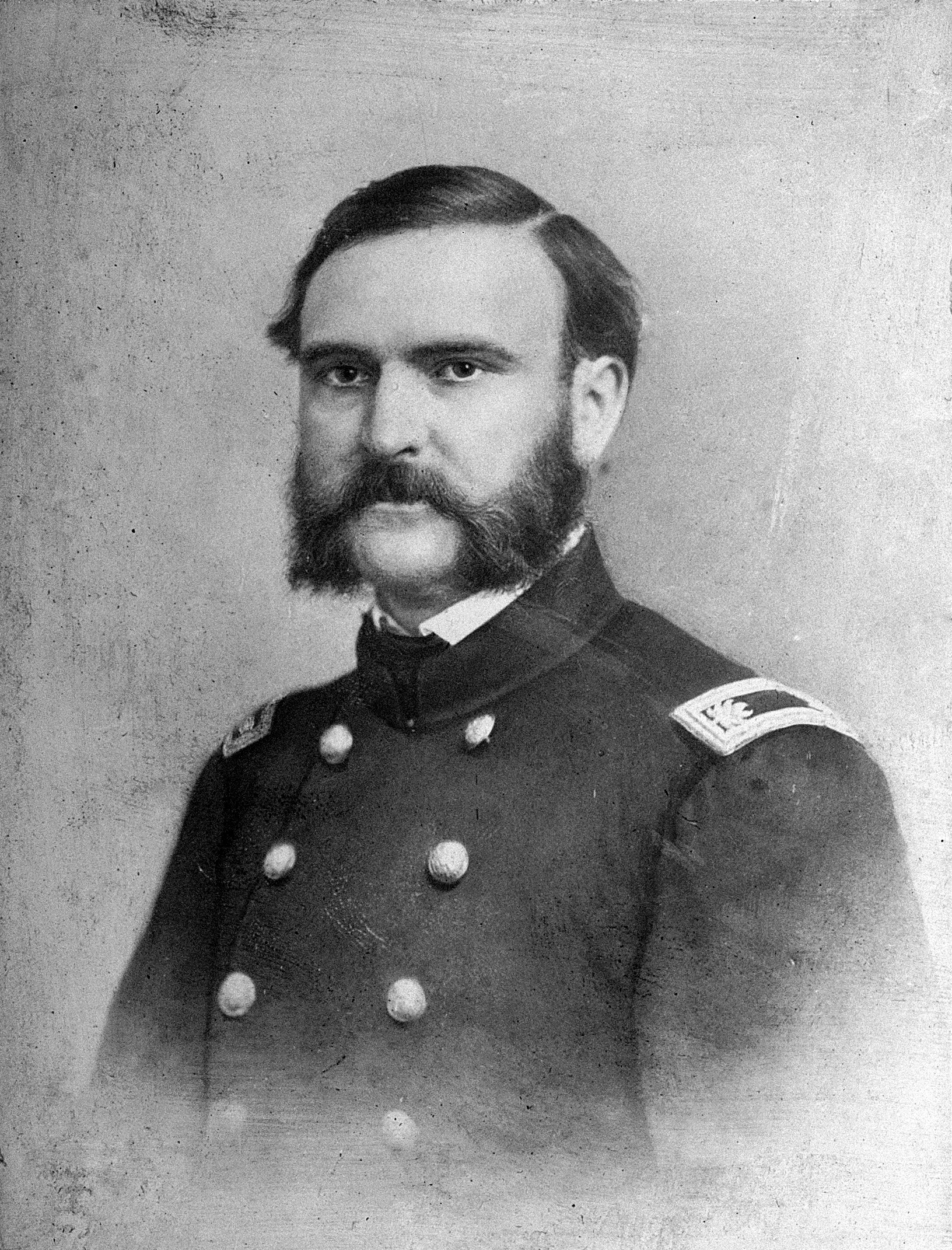
Halpine in the 1860s

Charles Graham Halpine (Halpin) (pseud. Miles O'Reilly) (20 November 1829 – 3 August 1868) was an Irish journalist, author and soldier during the American Civil War.

== Early life and family ==
Born at Oldcastle, County Meath, on 20 November 1829. Halpine was son of the Anne (née Grehan) and Rev. Nicholas John Halpin. He was educated at Trinity College, Dublin, until 1846, was originally intended for the medical profession, but he preferred the law, and in his leisure wrote for the press. The sudden death of his father and his own early marriage compelled him to adopt journalism as a profession.

On 25 January 1849, Halpine married Margaret Grace Milligan. They had a number of children, including Syble, Lucie, and Lonnie. Syble was born in Ireland, and remained there with her mother and her family when Halpine emigrated to the United States in 1851. They later joined Halpine. One of their daughters married the writer, Eugene Davis.

== Career ==
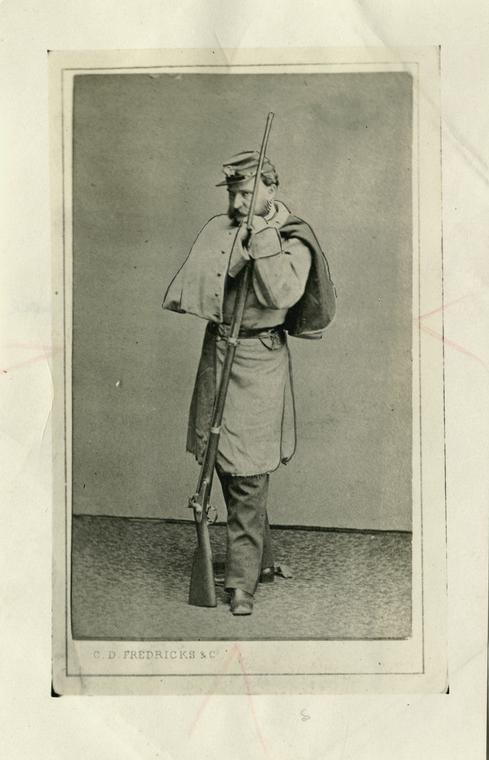
Charles Graham Halpine as his literary character Miles O'Reilly

In 1851 he emigrated to the United States, and took up his residence at Boston, where he became assistant editor of The Boston Post, and, with Benjamin Penhallow Shillaber, commenced a humorous journal called The Carpet Bag, which was unsuccessful. He afterwards resided at Washington, where he acted as the correspondent of The New York Times. Removing to New York he secured employment on the Herald, and in a few months established relations with several periodicals. He undertook a great variety of literary work, most of which was entirely ephemeral. He next became associate editor of the ‘New York Times,’ for which paper in 1855 and 1856 he wrote the Nicaragua correspondence at the time of William Walker's filibustering expedition. In 1857 he became principal editor and part proprietor of the New York Leader, which under his management rapidly increased in circulation.

At the beginning of the American Civil War in April 1861, he enlisted in the 69th New York infantry, in which he was soon elected a lieutenant, and served during the three months for which he had volunteered. He was then transferred to the staff of General David Hunter as assistant-adjutant-general with the rank of major, and soon after went with that officer to Missouri to relieve General John Charles Fremont. He accompanied General Hunter to Hilton Head, and while there wrote a series of burlesque poems in the assumed character of an Irish private. Several of them were contributed to the New York Herald in 1862 under the pseudonym of "Miles O'Reilly", and with additional articles were issued in two volumes entitled Life and Adventures, Songs, Services, and Speeches of Private Miles O'Reilly, 47th Regiment New York Volunteers, 1864, and Baked Meats of the Funeral, a Collection of Essays, Poems, Speeches, and Banquets, by Private Miles O'Reilly, late of the 47th Regiment New York Volunteer Infantry, 10th Army Corps. Collected, revised, and edited, with the requisite corrections of punctuation, spelling, and grammar, by an Ex-Colonel of the Adjutant-General's Department, with whom the Private formerly served as Lance-Corporal of Orderlies, 1866.

Halpine was subsequently assistant-adjutant-general on General Henry W. Halleck's staff with the rank of colonel in 1862, and accompanied General David Hunter as a staff-officer on his expedition up the Shenandoah valley in the spring of 1864. On his return to New York he resigned his commission in consequence of his bad eyesight, receiving the brevet of brigadier-general of volunteers.

He then made New York his home, and resuming his literary work became editor, and later on proprietor of the Citizen, a newspaper issued by the citizens' association to advocate reforms in the civil administration of New York city. In 1867 he was elected registrar of the county of New York by a coalition of republicans and democrats. Incessant labour brought on insomnia. He had recourse to opiates, and his death in New York city on 3 August 1868 was caused by an undiluted dose of chloroform. His widow later successfully petitioned for a pension to support his "several minor children" from the United States government.

Besides the books above mentioned he was the author of Lyrics by the Letter H, 1854.
