= Ada Clare =

American actress, writer, and feminist (1834–1874)

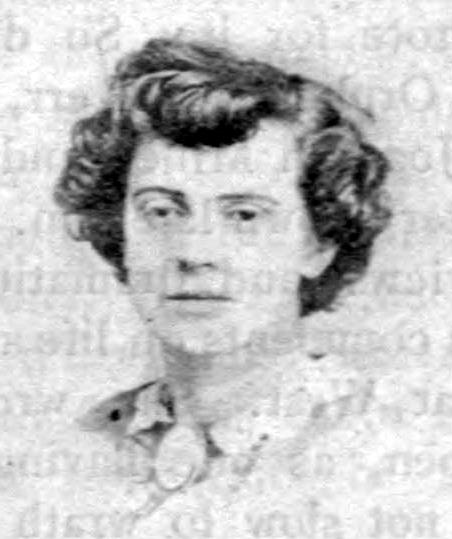
- Born: Ada Agnes Jane McElhenney; July 1834; Charleston, South Carolina, U.S.
- Died: March 4, 1874 (aged 39); New York City, New York, U.S.
- Occupations: Actress, writer
- Years active: 1858–1874

Ada Clare (pen names, Clare and Ada Clare; July 1834 – March 4, 1874) was an American actress and writer.

== Life and career ==
Ada Agnes Jane McElhenney was born in Charleston, South Carolina in 1834. She grew up under the care of her maternal grandfather as part of an aristocratic Southern family, but started her career as a writer around age 18, writing under the pseudonyms Clare and later Ada Clare.

She moved to New York City in 1854, took up acting, engaged in a widely publicized liaison with pianist and composer Louis Moreau Gottschalk, and bore a son out of wedlock. After a failed attempt at an acting career, she frequented Pfaff's Cellar, where she met Henry Clapp, editor of the Saturday Press, an iconoclastic weekly magazine of the arts., and subsequently began writing theater reviews, and, eventually a regular column for the journal and became known as the "Queen of Bohemia". Her only novel, entitled Only a Woman's Heart, was poorly received by reviewers, who criticized the author for her lack of skill with plot and dialogue. Clare was devastated, and returned to acting in a provincial stock company. On September 9, 1868, Clare married actor Frank Noyes in Houston, Texas.

Clare suffered a dog bite from a Poodle in her theatrical agent's office and died from rabies in 1874. Having been refused access to the nearest cemetery due to Ada having been a Spiritualist, she was buried on the estate of fellow Saturday Press writers, Edward Howland and Marie Howland in Hammonton, NJ, beside her recently deceased newborn. When the Howlands moved, Marie removed markers from the graves.

Ada's writing for the Saturday Press is included in The New York Saturday Press Omnibus Edition, published by funsub books in 2025.

== See also ==
- Pfaff's
- Fatal dog attacks in the United States
