= The Saturday Press (literary newspaper) =

The Saturday Press was a literary weekly newspaper, published in New York City from 1858 to 1860 and again from 1865 to 1866, edited by Henry Clapp Jr.

Clapp, nicknamed the "King of Bohemia" and credited with importing the term "bohemianism" to the U.S., was a central part of the antebellum New York literary and art scene. Today he is perhaps best known for his spotlighting of Walt Whitman, Fitz-James O'Brien, and Ada Clare – all habitués of the bohemian watering hole named Pfaff's beer cellar – in The Saturday Press. Clapp intended the Press to be New York's answer to The Atlantic Monthly. The Press was constantly troubled by financial problems, and Clapp died in poverty and obscurity.

Mark Twain's first short story, "The Celebrated Jumping Frog of Calaveras County", was first published under the title "Jim Smiley and His Jumping Frog" in The Saturday Press in 1865, when Twain was serving as regular contributor and editor.

In 2025, funsub books published a compilation of Saturday Press articles, The New York Saturday Press Omnibus Edition.
