= Under the Gaslight (film) =

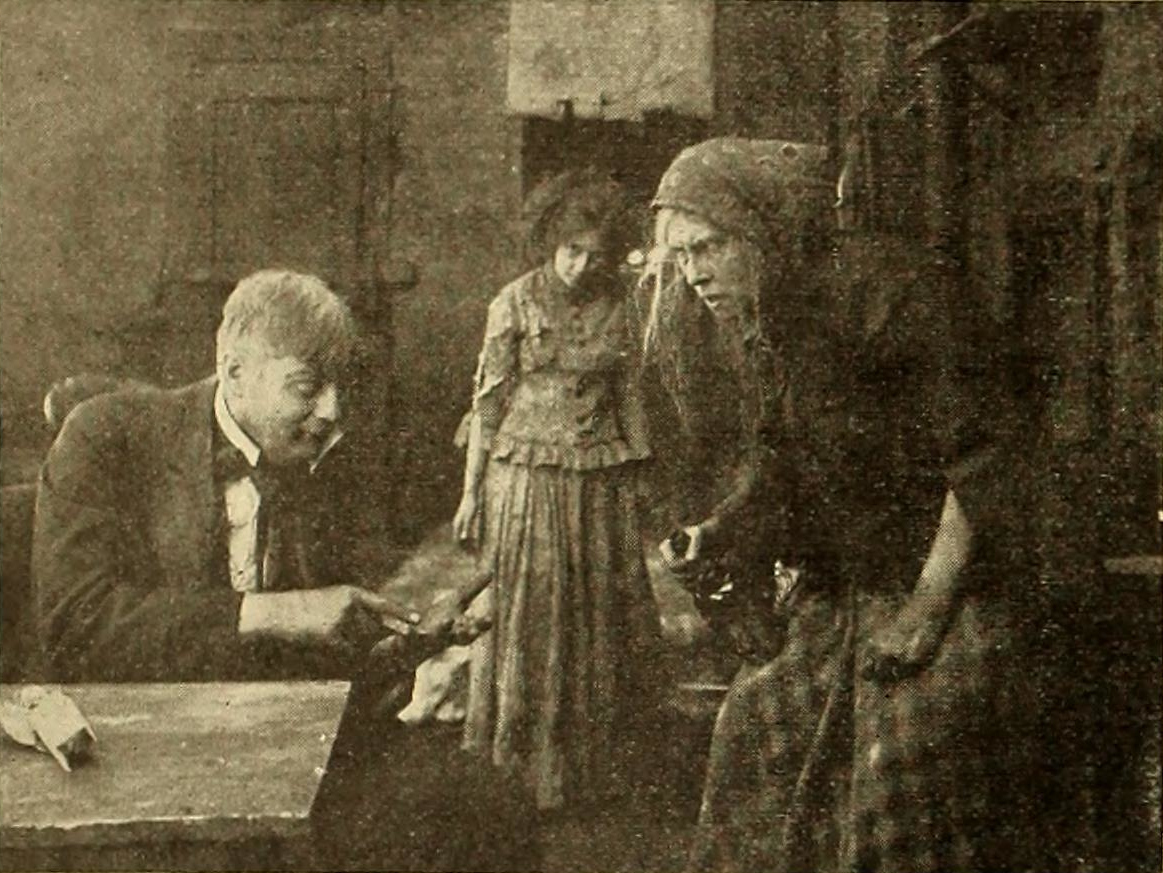
- Film still
- Directed by: Lawrence Marston
- Based on: Under the Gaslight by Augustin Daly
- Starring: Lionel Barrymore; William Russell
- Production company: Klaw & Erlanger / Biograph Company
- Distributed by: General Film Company
- Release date: December 1914
- Running time: 4 reels
- Country: United States
- Language: Silent (English intertitles)

Under the Gaslight is a 1914 American silent melodrama film produced by the Biograph Company, for theatrical impresarios Klaw & Erlanger, and distributed by The General Film Company. It is based on the old Victorian stage melodrama of the same name by Augustin Daly popular in the 1860s and 1870s and revived periodically for years afterwards. This film was directed by Lawrence Marston and stars Lionel Barrymore.

== Cast ==
- Lionel Barrymore as William Byke
- William Russell as Ray Trafford
- Irene Howley as Pearl Courtland
- Millicent Evans as Laura Courtland
- Isabel Rea as Mrs. Courtland
- Thomas Jefferson as Mr. Courtland
- Hector Sarno as Snorky (credited as Hector V. Sarno)
- Zoe Gregory as Blossom
- Maurice Steuart as Laura as a child
- Rosana Logan as Pearl as a child

unbilled

- Mrs. A.C. Marston as Judas

== Cast note ==
In 1874 Maurice Barrymore, father of the star of the movie, arrived in the United States and joined Augustin Daly's stage company playing a role, Ray Trafford, in this play.

== Preservation ==
With no prints of Under the Gaslight located in any film archives, it is a lost film.
