= Jennie Worrell =

American actress

Jennie Worrell (1850 - August 11, 1899) was a burlesque actress of the 19th century from Cincinnati, Ohio. She was the youngest of three Worrell sisters who appeared in Broadway productions from 1867 to 1872.

== Sister act ==
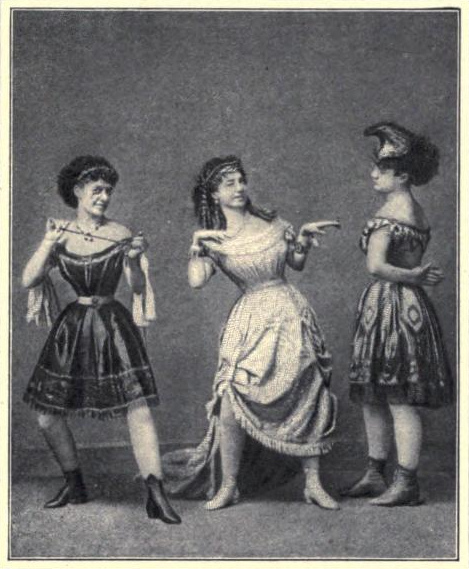
The Worrell Sisters in La Belle Hélène

She was the daughter of William Worrell, a circus clown. Her sisters were Irene Worrell and Sophie Worrell. The sisters performed on stage as children, singing and dancing their way to popularity in California and Australia. In 1866 they came to New York City and gained possession of a theatre on Broadway (Manhattan) opposite Waverly Place (Manhattan). They called it the Worrell sisters' New York Theatre. They acted in a musical burlesque followed by a production of Under the Gaslight (1867) by Augustin Daly. In the latter play the sisters depicted roles created by Rose Eytinge, Blanche Grey, and Rose Skennett. Worrell was the best actress of the three siblings. In the spring of 1866 she was in Nan the Good For Nothing at Wood's Theatre. Previously the sisters performed together at the same venue in Elves.

THE WORRELL SISTERS: Jennie was one of three notable sisters who came to fame in the 1800s. Starting as childhood stars, the sisters, Jennie, Sophie, and Irene grew to critical acclaim later in life by being the premier burlesque performers of the time. The earliest of the burlesque shows put on by the Sisters and other artists of the time had a sort of set list that the artists followed with precision. This set list included, “an opening with songs, then acrobats and even magicians, and finally a burlesque done in the English or Victorian Style” (Hughes 26). Whether it was due to their father being a clown, or having to be stuck with their two siblings their entire life, these talented sisters were proficient entertainers. Their shows lasted about an hour and varied in the way they were structured. Before the Worrell Sisters were completely on the scene, the structure of a burlesque show was thus: music, then acrobats, then a small parody skit. Once the girls were in their prime however, the shows morphed into more skits and even sometimes a full-blown parody of an entire play or musical. This would include keeping the basic character archetype, and sometimes even poking fun at it, and keeping music but changing lyrics to songs in the score. The shows were hilarious and were even sometimes more popular than the shows they were making fun of. They mocked the musical conventions and the theatrical styles that the shows were originally done in. In fact, the word "burlesque" originated from the Italian burla, which meant mockery. Because of their successes with multiple audiences, they rose to such acclaim that in later years they were able to purchase their theater right in New York City. Their theater was called the Worrell Sisters’ New York City Theatre and it hosted many burlesque shows of the time that the sisters sometimes acted in themselves. They bought the theatre in 1866. Their theatre was home to not only famous burlesque and parody shows but also melodramas such as Under the Gaslight which required a lot of dramatic and realistic scenery. To keep up with the times, the Sisters tried to keep their theater as up to date as possible. After their fame was over, the youngest and most famous sister Jennie became destitute . Her sisters separated themselves from her because of her degenerate lifestyle and their theater was sold later becoming The Globe theatre in 1870 and the New Theatre Comique in 1881. The building became the Broadway Athletic Club and was eventually demolished in 1884, however no one could contest its notoriety thanks to the Worrell trio (Playbill).

Burlesque became increasingly popular with the arrival of Lydia Thompson and her British Blondes. This added to the appeal of the Worrell sisters. Nevertheless, their business was not profitable and they gave up the theatre in 1868. It became the Broadway Athletic Club in later years.

== Marriage ==
She married Mike Murray, the manager of a gambling resort. Murray and Worrell separated in 1888 when he ran a gambling establishment at 13 West 28th Street. They reconciled. Murray died in his office at 128 East 14th Street (Manhattan) in June 1895. The cause of death was heart disease.

== Death ==
Worrell died in 1899 at the Kings County Hospital of burns she sustained while sleeping on the grass meadows at the foot of 17th Street, in Coney Island. She lived there destitute, having resided in Coney Island for some years after divorcing Murray. Police of the precinct had arrested her a number of times. Her sisters separated themselves from her years before because of her degenerate lifestyle.

The New York Times reported that she was to be buried in Potter's Field in Flatbush, Brooklyn, unless someone claimed her body.
