= Virginia Dreher =

American actress

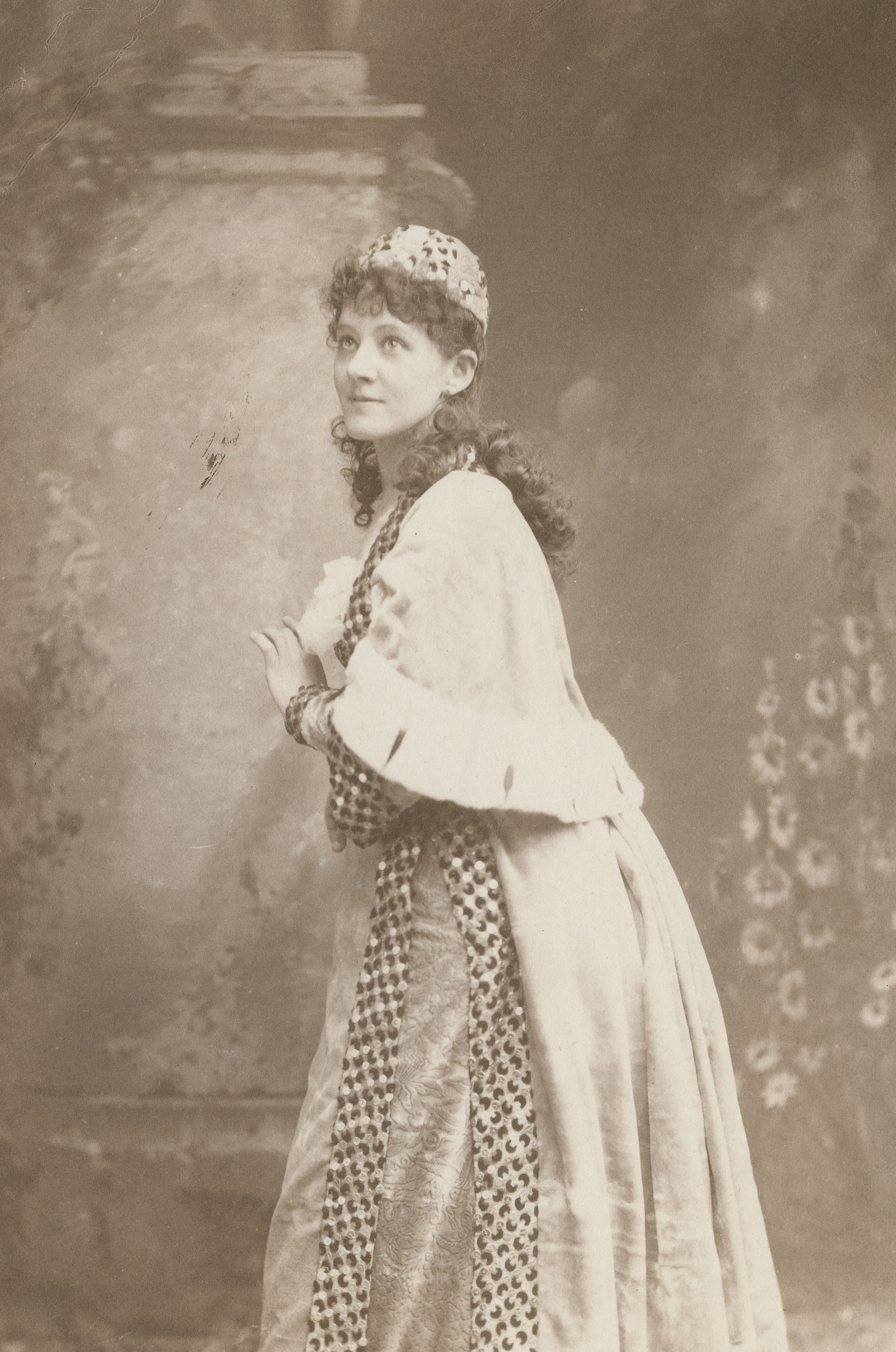
- Born: Jennie Cummings Murphy; 1857/59; Kentucky, U.S.
- Died: November 11, 1898; Phoenix, Arizona Territory, U.S.
- Occupation: Actor
- Years active: 1883-1889
- Spouses: Paul Dreher; George Postlethwaite (m. 1888)
- Children: 1

Virginia Dreher (born Jennie Cummings Murphy; 1857/59- November 11, 1898), was an American stage actress of the late Victorian era. She was a leading actress in the Augustin Daly company of the 1880s.

She was married to physician Paul Dreher and, after his death, to stockbroker and railroad magnate George Postlethwaite.

After her first husband's death a theater manager in Louisville, Kentucky, hired her to perform despite her lack of experience on stage. Daly heard of her work there and hired her for his company.

She died in Arizona from tuberculosis in 1898.
