= Fifth Avenue Presbyterian Church =

Church in Manhattan, New York

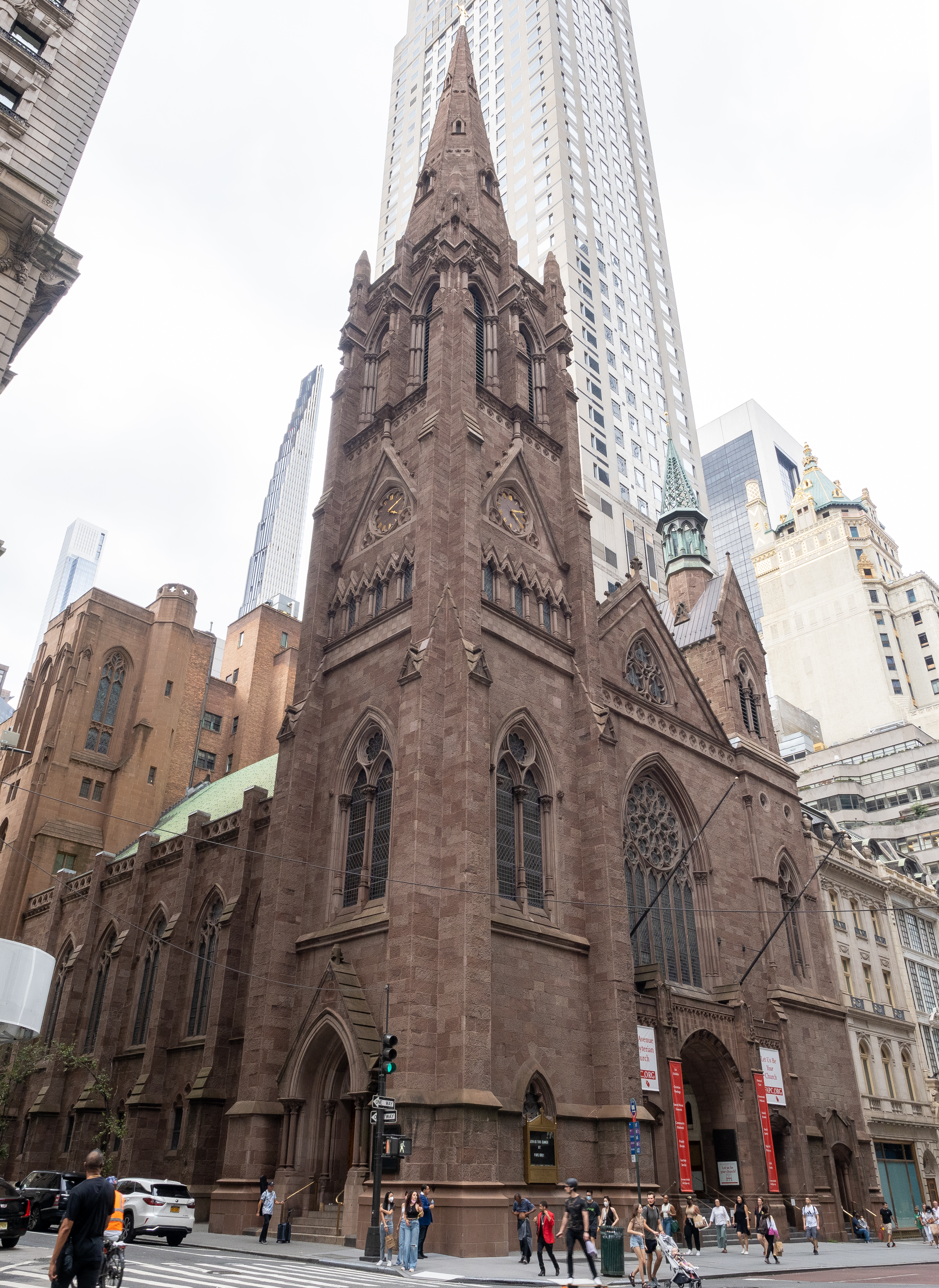

- Location within Manhattan
- 40.7620°N 73.9751°W
- Location: Midtown Manhattan, New York City, New York
- Country: United States
- Denomination: Presbyterian Church (USA)
- Churchmanship: Liberal Protestantism
- Website: fapc.org

History
- Former name(s): Cedar Street Presbyterian, Duane Street Presbyterian, Presbyterian Church in the Fifth Avenue at the Corner of Nineteenth Street
- Status: Church
- Founded: June 28, 1808
- Consecrated: May 9, 1875

Architecture
- Functional status: Active
- Style: Gothic Revival

Specifications
- Height: 286 ft (87 m)

Administration
- Parish: Fifth Avenue

Fifth Avenue Presbyterian Church is a Presbyterian Church (U.S.A.) church in New York City. The church, on Fifth Avenue at 7 West 55th Street in Midtown Manhattan, has approximately 2,200 members and is one of the larger PCUSA congregations. The church, founded in 1808 as the Cedar Street Presbyterian Church, has been at this site since 1875.

Fifth Avenue Presbyterian Church (FAPC) has long been noted for its high standards in preaching and music and has been at the forefront of many movements, from the development of the Sunday school in the 19th century to its current leadership in homeless advocacy. In 2001, the church successfully sued the City of New York for the right to shelter homeless individuals on its front steps.

In 1884, the joint funeral of the first wife of future President Theodore Roosevelt, Alice, and his mother, Martha Roosevelt, took place here. In 1910, the church's historic sanctuary was the site of the wedding of TR's son, Theodore Roosevelt Jr., an event attended by the former president and 500 of his former Rough Riders. It was also the site of the 1965 recording of A Concert of Sacred Music by Duke Ellington and his orchestra, broadcast nationally by CBS television in 1966, and of dance legend Frankie Manning's "rollicking three-hour memorial service" in 2009.

Architecturally and historically, “Fifth Avenue Presbyterian Church has a sloping auditorium, fine acoustics, old gas brackets and reflectors. Instrumental in founding Princeton Theological Seminary, Presbyterian Hospital (now New York Presbyterian Hospital) and many a mission church, this house of God is often called the Cathedral of Presbyterianism.”

== History ==
The congregation now known as Fifth Avenue Presbyterian Church began on November 6, 1808, on the north side of Cedar Street between Nassau and William Streets in lower Manhattan. Its first name was The Presbyterian Church in Cedar Street. In 1836, the congregation moved north to the corner of Duane and Church Streets and was renamed The Presbyterian Church in Duane Street. In 1852, the congregation again moved northward, naming itself the Presbyterian Church in the Fifth Avenue at the Corner of Nineteenth Street. It moved to its current location, at the corner of Fifth Avenue and 55th Street, in 1875, when it assumed its current name.

Notable early members of the congregation included Oliver Wolcott Jr., former Secretary of the Treasury and son of a signer of the Declaration of Independence; Archibald Gracie, whose Gracie Mansion is now the residence of the mayor of New York City; and Betsey Jackson, an African American household slave. Church member Joanna Bethune (1770–1860) was a co-founder of the first benevolence association to aid poor women and children. Bethune is regarded as “the mother of the American Sunday School” for her work founding the first Sabbath schools for disadvantaged children. Among the first officers of the church was Richard Varick, an aide to George Washington and former mayor of New York City.

The church was instrumental in founding such organizations as the New York Bible Society, the American Bible Society, Princeton Theological Seminary, and various interdenominational mission boards. In 1815, members of the congregation established the first free schools, which later were expanded into the New York Public School System.

=== Pastoral leadership ===
The congregation has called 17 senior pastors since its founding in 1808. The first, the Rev. Dr. John B. Romeyn, was 28 years old when he was called to the Cedar Street church. The son of a Dutch Reformed minister, Romeyn attended Union College in Schenectady and received a degree from Columbia College at age 18. The fourth senior pastor, the Rev. Dr. James Waddel Alexander, served two terms, from 1844 to 1849, and 1851 to 1859. During his pastorate, the church relocated from Duane Street to Nineteenth Street, where it installed a pipe organ and pioneered congregational hymn singing (a change from the formal quartets typical at other Presbyterian churches of the period). Under his leadership, the church became a leader in establishing mission chapels and Sunday schools.

In 1867, a young Irish preacher, the Rev. Dr. John Hall, impressed the elders of the Nineteenth Street Church during a speaking tour of the US. The church issued a unanimous call, and Hall was installed that same year. Within five years, membership rose 50 percent, and Hall spearheaded the effort to construct a new church building (the current location on Fifth Avenue and 55th Street). The New York Times reported Hall's “powerful preaching and wise churchmanship made the Fifth Avenue Presbyterian Church one of the great religious powers in the city.” Hall led the church until his death in 1898. The Rev. J. Ross Stevenson, later President of Princeton Theological Seminary, served as pastor from 1902 to 1909. John Henry Jowett, an English preacher and writer, was pastor from 1911 to 1918. Under his pastorate, it was not uncommon for the church to have to turn away as many as 1,000 would-be worshippers on a given Sunday.

The Rev. Dr. John Bonnell served as senior pastor from 1935 to 1962. Bonnell was a nationally recognized author and religious broadcaster on the ABC radio network as host of the series "National Vespers", which reached 3 million listeners weekly from 1936 until 1961. In 1956, he introduced Dial-a-Prayer, which continued as a ministry of the church for half a century. Bonnell played a leading role in the movement to strengthen ties between Protestants and Roman Catholics and was presented with a silver medal for ecumenical services by Pope Paul VI in 1966. He also served as co-chair of the National Conference of Christians and Jews.

The Rev. Dr. Bryant Kirkland served as senior pastor from 1962 until 1987. Kirkland was named Clergyman of the Year in 1975 by the Religious Heritage of America. The David B. Skinner Shelter, a shelter for homeless men the church has operated since 1986, began during his pastorate.

Dr. Kirkland's term was followed by the short but tumultuous pastorate of the Rev. Dr. R. Maurice Boyd, a charismatic figure whose ministerial style alienated a large faction of the congregation and who resigned under protest in 1992. In the wake of this dissension, many of his supporters left Fifth Avenue Presbyterian to join Dr. Boyd at the City Church of New York, which he founded. After his abrupt departure, a protégé of Kirkland's, the Rev. Dr. Thomas K. Tewell, was called as senior pastor in 1994. Under Tewell's leadership, the church completed an extensive renovation of the Sanctuary and church house, and the excavation and construction of the LaDane Williamson Christian Education Center, which is home to a vibrant Family Ministries program.

The current senior pastor, installed in 2008, is the Rev. Dr. Scott Black Johnston. A former professor of homiletics at Austin Presbyterian Theological Seminary, he is the author of a blog about faith in New York entitled Sharp About Your Prayers.

== Beliefs ==
=== Marriage ===
The church has an inclusive vision and celebrates both opposite-sex marriages and same-sex marriages.

== Architecture ==
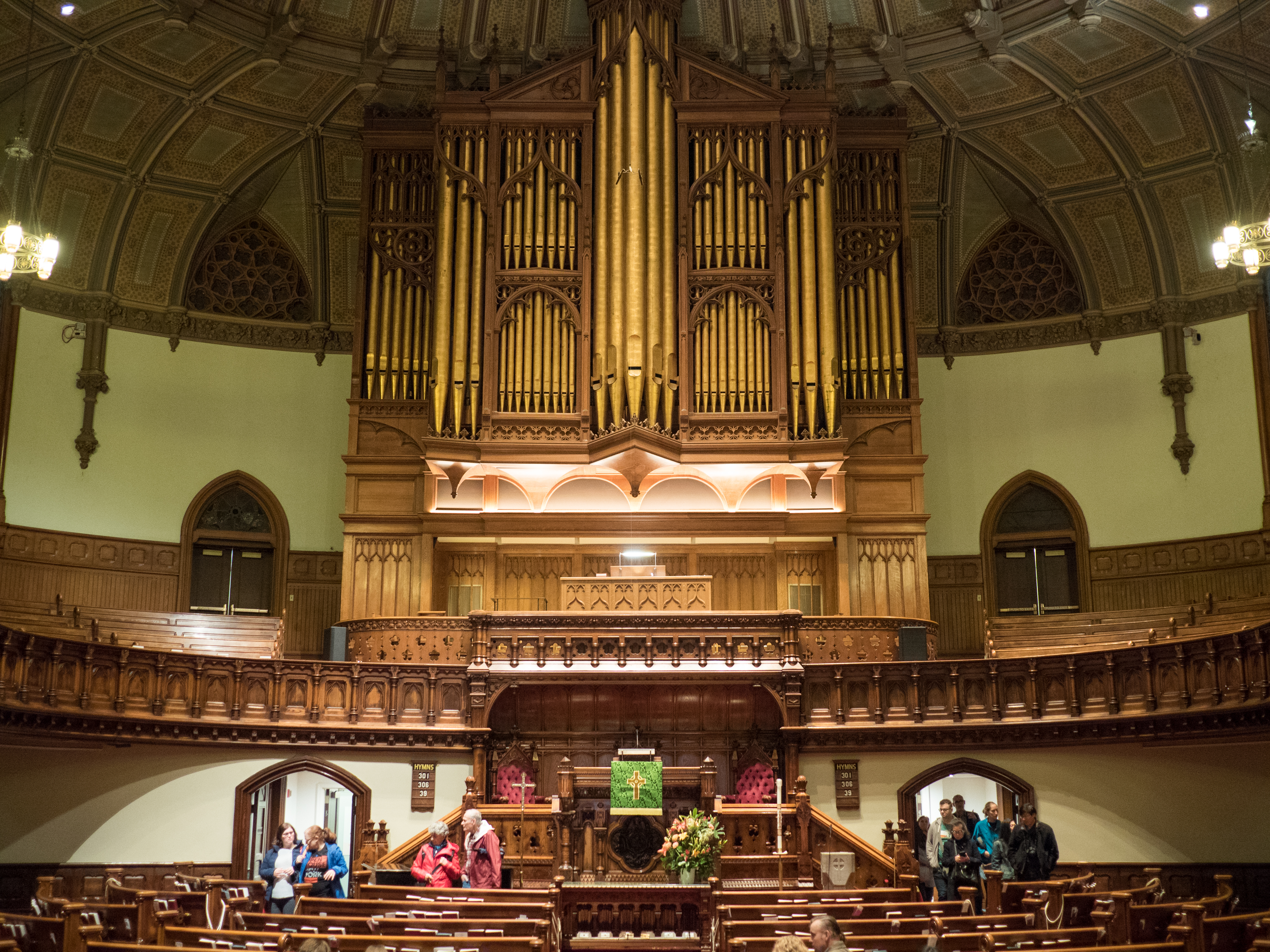
Interior in 2019

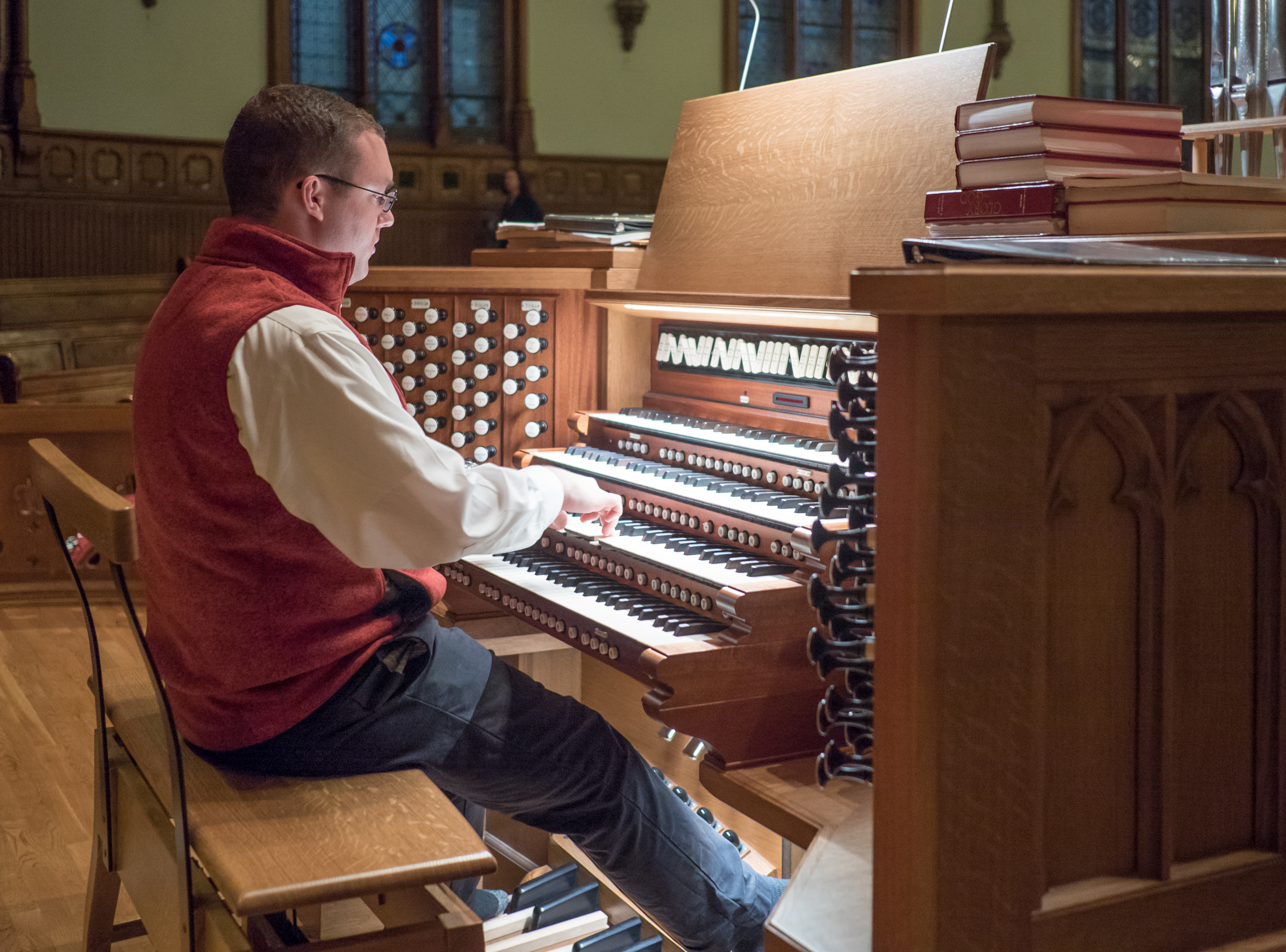
Organist Patrick Kreeger playing the church's organ

In 1873, the congregation purchased the undeveloped site at Fifth Avenue and 55th Street for $350,000 for construction of a new sanctuary. Church leaders believed that the recently established Central Park would be a natural barrier against business and factory expansion. With its steeple rising 286 feet high, the church was the tallest building in Manhattan when it was dedicated in 1875.

Eleven architects were considered to design the new church, with the choice eventually between George B. Post, architect of the New York Stock Exchange Building and the former Cornelius Vanderbilt II House on Fifth Avenue, and Carl Pfeiffer (1834–88), a little-known, 37-year-old German émigré. Pfeiffer's only other prominent building in New York was the Metropolitan Savings Bank Building, designed in 1867. Remarkably, Pfeiffer got the nod. Pfeiffer's engineering skills are evident in the technological innovations he introduced in the sanctuary. Wooden louvers installed beneath the pews allowed warm air to rise into the sanctuary from steam pipes in the basement. On warm days, enormous blocks of ice were delivered to the basement, where fans blew cooling air upward. The Sanctuary did not have modern air conditioning until 2003.

=== Facade ===
The church is built of New Jersey red sandstone. The clock tower employs the original clockworks installed in 1875. The clock is not electrified and must be wound once a week by hand. There are no bells or chimes in the tower; when the church was built, St. Luke's Hospital was housed in what is now the Hotel Peninsula (across 55th Street), and there was a concern church bells might disturb the patients.

=== Interior ===
With a capacity of nearly 2,000, Fifth Avenue Presbyterian Church is the largest Presbyterian sanctuary in Manhattan. Designed in the Victorian Gothic style, the Sanctuary interior follows strict, Reformed Protestant precepts—the most important being the emphasis on the spoken word. The pulpit is the focal point of the Sanctuary, with the choir loft and organ above and communion table below. There are no Biblical figures or saints depicted in the Sanctuary, reflecting an iconoclastic austerity prevalent among 19th-century Presbyterians, who believed no one should be venerated other than God. One exception is the woodcarving on the front of the pulpit (above), which features the symbols of the four Gospel authors—Matthew (angel), Mark (lion), Luke (ox) and John (eagle).

Unlike most Gothic churches, the interior of the sanctuary has no right angles. The floor slopes, the pews fan outward, and the balcony surrounds all that is below, bringing the entire congregation within clear sight and hearing range of the preaching and music ministry. Most of the carved woodwork in the Sanctuary is original. The New York firm of Kimbel and Cabus designed the woodwork using ash, a durable, light-colored wood that has taken on a darker patina over time. The stained glass windows were designed and executed by John C. Spence of Montreal. Above the Fifth Avenue entrance is a mosaic of Venetian glass by the American artist Eugene Savage (1883–1978). The mosaic, depicting iconic images from the Hebrew scriptures, was added during a renovation in the early 1960s.

Kirkland Chapel, named for former senior pastor Bryant M. Kirkland, offers a distinct contrast in design philosophy to the Sanctuary. All is rigidly organized in a long and narrow rectangular space from back to front, where there is a semi-circular apse with a raised pulpit off to one side and a lectern on the other. In a pre-Reformation church, the center of the apse would contain an altar, where the priest would celebrate the Eucharist. Following Reformed precepts, however, seats for the now-called ministers replace the altar. The design accentuates the Word rather than the Eucharist as the central act of worship. Another obvious difference between the Chapel and the Sanctuary is the stained glass that shows Biblical stories and figures. (Iconoclastic sentiment was beginning to wane by the early 20th century.) The window above the ministers’ seats depicts the apostles and the four evangelists. The most exquisite window in the church is above the balcony in the rear of the Chapel. It depicts Christ surrounded by seven archangels. The hardstone surfaces of the interior, with its resultant echo, make the Chapel superb for the performance of organ and choral music.

=== Chapel and church house ===
The current chapel and church house were added to the church grounds in 1925. Both were designed by the New York architect James Gamble Rogers (1867–1947). Rogers was the favored architect of New York philanthropist Edward Harkness, who provided the funds for the project.

=== Renovation ===
Fifth Avenue Presbyterian Church underwent a major renovation and expansion project beginning in 2003. The project resulted in a new Christian Education Center, carved from the unused space below the Sanctuary, and a complete renovation of the church house, including air-conditioning and fire proofing systems. Beginning in summer 2015, FAPC conducted extensive repair work to the brownstone exterior and renovated the music loft in the sanctuary. This work has been completed.
