= Under the Gaslight =

- The famous train scene.
- Original language: English
- Written by: Augustin Daly
- Genre: Melodrama

Premiere
- Date: 12 August 1867
- Place: Worrell Sisters' New York Theatre

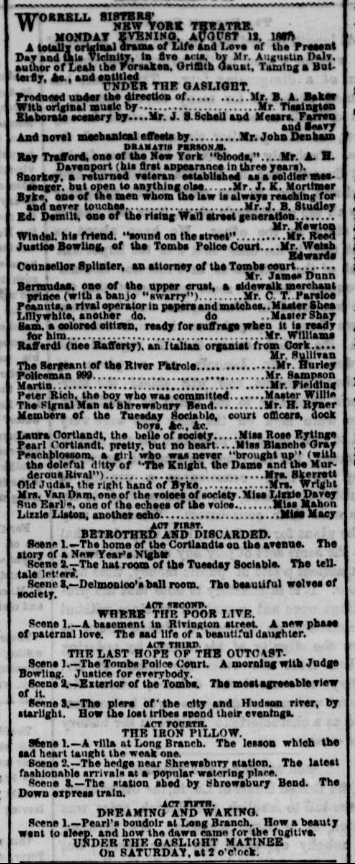
Advertisement for debut of play in August 11, 1867 issue of the New York Herald with full cast listing.

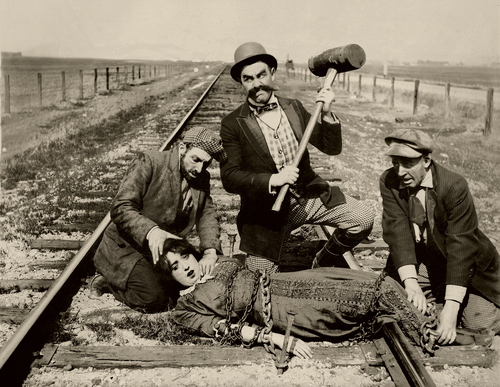
"Barney Oldfield's A Race for a Life" [1913] with left to right:Hank Mann; Ford Sterling; Al St John and in foreground Mabel Normand

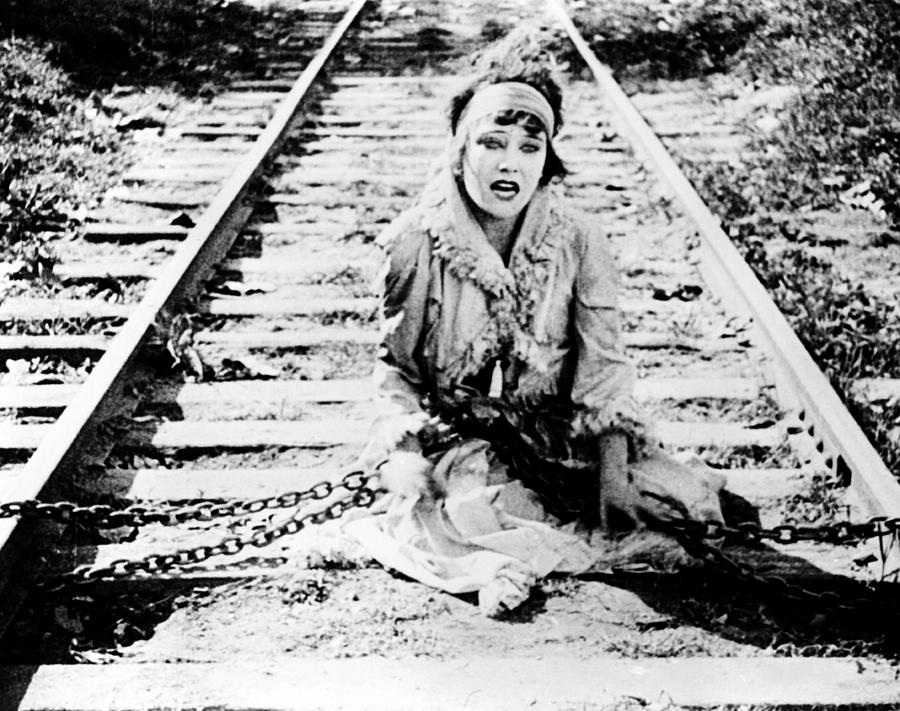
Gloria Swanson in Teddy at the Throttle 1917

Under the Gaslight is an 1867 play by Augustin Daly. It was his first successful play, and is a primary example of a melodrama, best known for its suspense scene where a person is tied to railroad tracks as a train approaches, only to be saved from death at the last possible moment.

== Reception ==
The show had a successful initial run at the Worrell Sisters' New York Theatre in New York, starting on August 12, 1867, and running through October 1, a total of 47 performances. Rose Eytinge starred at Laura Courtland. It returned for an additional two-month run in December 1867, with the Worrell Sisters playing the lead three female roles.

The play is an example of Daly's mixture of realism and melodrama, with authenticity of his depiction of real locations in New York in the play, and in his use of social commentary. Though the play introduced the now-clichéd device of the villain tying someone to railroad tracks, it was also a reversal of the usual roles because a male character (Snorkey, a comic sidekick) was tied up, and the heroine saves him.

In the book Vagrant Memories, critic William Winter recalls how Daly came up with the device: "He was walking home toward night, thinking intently about the play which he had begun to write, when suddenly the crowning expedient occurred to him and at the same instant he stumbled over a misplaced flagstone, striking his right foot against the edge of the stone and sustaining a severe hurt. 'I was near my door,' he said, 'and I rushed into the house, threw myself into a chair, grasping my injured foot with both hands, for the pain was great, and exclaiming, over and over again, "I've got it! I've got it! And it beats hot-irons all to pieces!" I wasn't even thinking of the hurt. I had the thought of having my hero tied on a railroad track and rescued by his sweetheart, just in the nick of time, before the swift passage of an express train across a dark stage.'"

Some have argued that Daly borrowed the train device from the English play The Engineer, which also put a train on the stage though the circumstances of the storyline were not identical. Daly was able to successfully get an injunction against Dion Boucicault over his 1868 play After Dark, which also had a train scene, a case that became an important decision in copyright law.

== Original cast (New York, August 12, 1867) ==
- Ray Trafford by A.H. (Dolly) Davenport
- Snorkey by John K. Mortimer
- Byke by John B. Studley
- Ed. Demilt by Mr. Newton
- Windel by Mr. Reed
- Justice Bowling by Welsh Edwards
- Counsellor Splinter by Jason Dunn
- Bermudas by C.T. Parsloe
- Peanuts by Master Shea
- Lillywhite by Master Shay
- Sam by Mr. Williams
- Rafferdi by Mr. Sullivan
- The Sergeant of the River Patrol by Mr. Hurley
- Policeman 999 by Mr. Sampson
- Martin by Mr. Fielding
- Peter Rich by Master Willie
- The Signal Man at Shrewsbury Road by Mr. H. Ryner
- Laura Courtland by Rose Eytinge
- Pearl Courtland by Blanche Grey
- Peachblossom by Mrs. Skerrett
- Old Judas by Mrs. Wright
- Mrs. Van Dam by Miss Lizzie Davey
- Sue Earlie by Miss Mason
- Lizzie Liston by Miss Macy

== Adaptations and legacy ==
The play was adapted to a silent film of the same name in 1914. A 1929 revival on Broadway at Fay's Bowery Theatre was not successful, only running for three weeks.

Daly aggressively defended the play's copyright by pursuing unauthorized productions. This led to two United States Supreme court cases, Webster v. Daly and Brady v. Daly.

Unlike the vast majority of 19th century American plays, Under the Gaslight has continued to be revived to the modern day. Notable revivals include ones in 1993 at the Soho Repertory Theatre in New York, 1995 at the Laguna Playhouse in southern California and the Metropolitan Playhouse in New York in 2009, among others.

The play was featured in Theodore Dreiser's novel Sister Carrie.
