= New York Theatre =

New York Theatre may stand for:

- New York Theatre Workshop, off-Broadway theatre in the Bowery, Lower East Side of Manhattan
- Bowery Theatre, Lower East Side of Manhattan, New York City
- Olympia Theatre (New York City), built by Oscar Hammerstein I
- New Theatre Comique, former theater in New York City

== See also ==
- Culture of New York City#Theatre
- New York Theatre Ballet
