= Carl Pfeiffer (architect) =

American architect

- Born: 1834 (Note: Other years are given by different sources, including 1836 and 1838.); Brunswick
- Died: April 27, 1888; Washington, D.C.
- Occupation: Architect

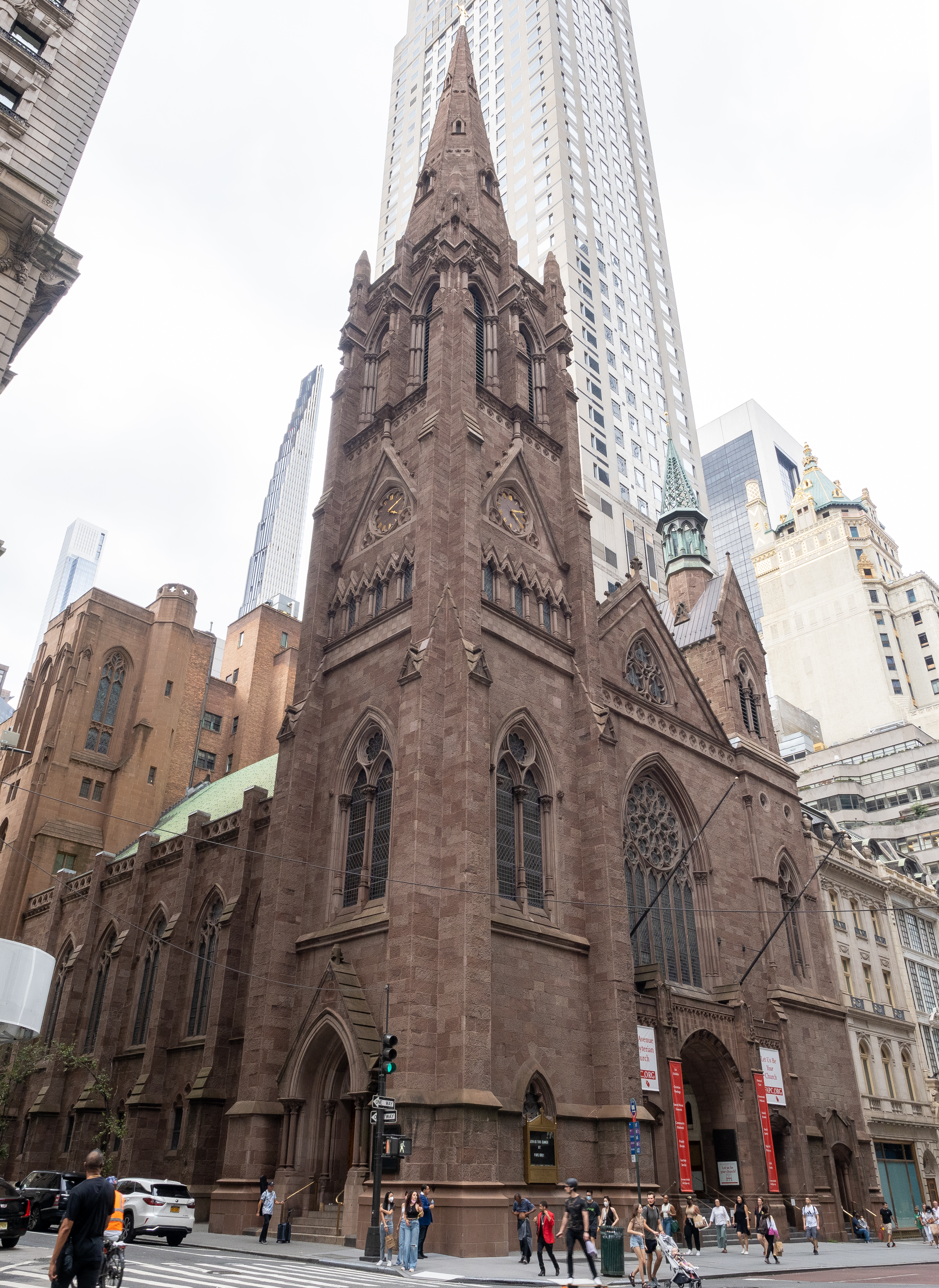
The Fifth Avenue Presbyterian Church in New York City, designed by Pfeiffer and completed in 1875.

Carl Pfeiffer (1834–1888) was a German American architect practicing in New York City.

== Life and career ==
Carl Pfeiffer was born in 1834 in Brunswick, Germany, and came to the United States as a teenager in 1850. He was trained in architecture and engineering in Ohio and elsewhere in the midwest before coming east to New York City c. 1860, where he worked as a draftsman for four additional years. (Note: Some sources, including his obituary in the American Architect and Building News, instead indicate that he received a thorough education as an engineer in Germany and came to the United States in his twenties.) At an unknown date he also worked with the Philadelphia architect Samuel Sloan, who in 1868 called him a "friend and former pupil." In 1864 he established an office of his own in New York, and was in continuous practice until his death in 1888. He was particularly known for his expertise in ventilation systems, and designed many hospitals and churches.

Pfeiffer joined the American Institute of Architects in 1867, and was elected a Fellow in 1872. For two years he was secretary of the organization. Following his death, Pfeiffer's practice was purchased by architect Peter J. Lauritzen, then of Brooklyn. Lauritzen's works include the Offerman Building in Brooklyn.

== Personal life ==
Pfeiffer was married to Elizabeth Dayton in 1871. She was the daughter of Aaron Ogden Dayton, the long-time Fourth Auditor of the United States Treasury. They had two children, a son and a daughter. For the last few years of his life Pfeiffer was in poor health, and about a month prior to his death traveled south to Asheville, North Carolina, in search of rest. On his return north he stopped at the home of relatives in Washington, D.C., where he died April 27, 1888. His wife died August 21, 1913, in New York.

== Legacy ==
Two of Pfeiffer's works have been designated New York City Landmarks, one of which has also been listed on the United States National Register of Historic Places.

== Architectural works ==
- 140 West Broadway building, New York City (1866)
- Church of the Messiah, 10 Park Ave, New York City (1866–68, demolished 1931)
- German Hospital, Park Ave and E 77th St, New York City (1867, demolished)
- Metropolitan Savings Bank Building, 9 E 7th St, New York City (1867, NYCL 1969, NRHP 1979)
- Roosevelt Hospital, 1000 Tenth Ave, New York City (1869–71, demolished)
- Germania Fire Insurance Company Bowery Building, 357 Bowery, New York City (1870, NYCL 2010)
- "Oak Terrace" for Valentine G. Hall Jr., 794 Woods Rd, Clermont, New York (1872)
- Second Reformed (Hope) Church, (Note: This building was executed by architect William G. Robinson of Grand Rapids. The tower has been incorporated into the new building on the site.) 77 W 11th St, Holland, Michigan (1872–74, demolished 1981)
- Fifth Avenue Presbyterian Church, 7 W 55th St, New York City (1873–75)
- St. Omer Hotel, 724 (formerly 384) Sixth Ave, New York City (1873, demolished)
- Middletown State Hospital, 45 Ashley Ave, Middletown, New York (1874, demolished)
- New Jersey Building, Centennial Exposition, Philadelphia, Pennsylvania (1876, temporary building)
- The Berkshire, 21 E 52nd St, New York City (1881, demolished)
- House for Earl P. Mason, 23 Charlesfield St, Providence, Rhode Island (1882, demolished 1952)
- House for Annie Dayton and Mary Dayton, (Note: The home of Pfeiffer's sisters-in-law, where he died in 1888.) 1917 N St NW, Washington, DC (1883, demolished)
- Moses Taylor Hospital, 700 Quincy Ave, Scranton, Pennsylvania (1883, partially extant)
- House for Horatio N. Campbell Jr., 50 Narragansett Bay Ave, Warwick, Rhode Island (1884)
- All Saints Memorial Episcopal Church (former), 11 Aspetuck Ave, New Milford, Connecticut (1885–88)

== Gallery of architectural works ==
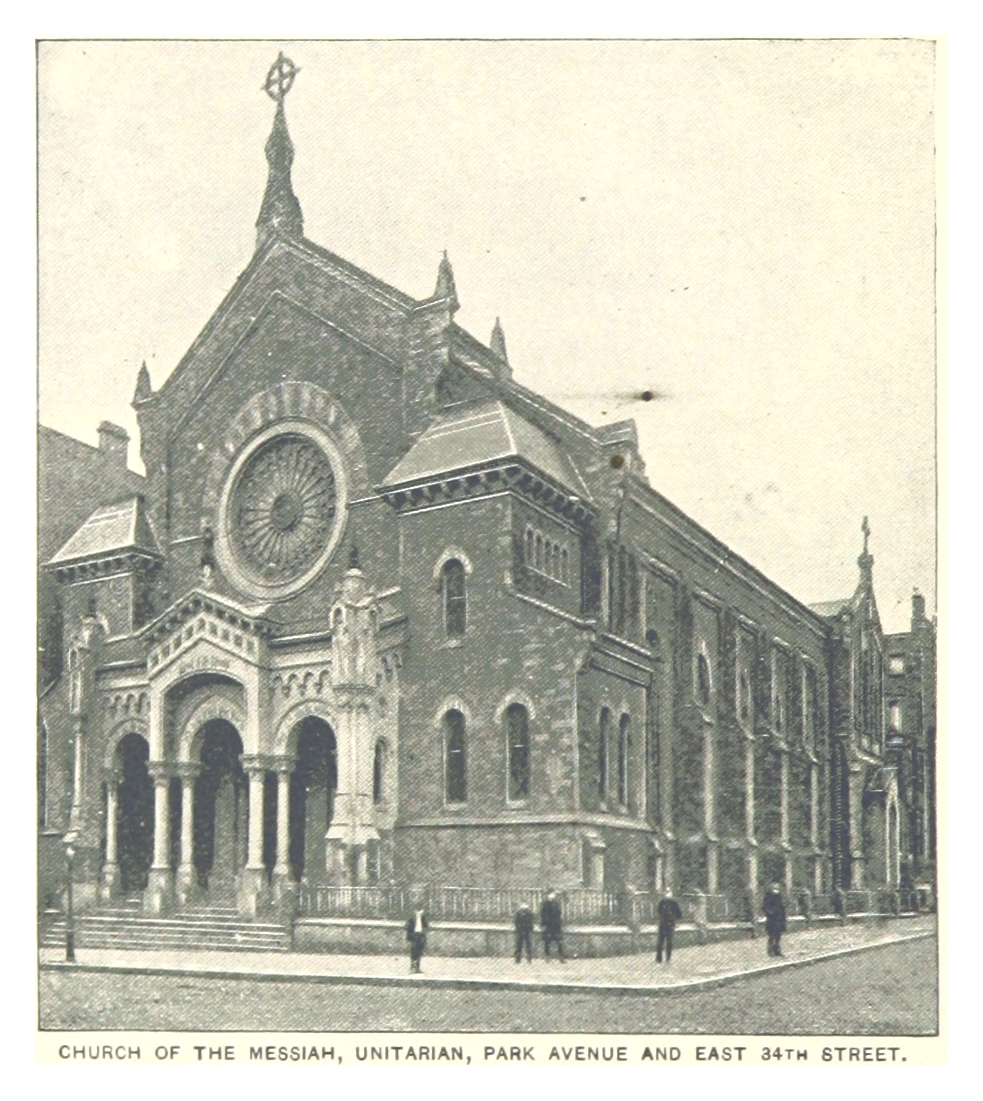
Church of the Messiah, New York City, 1866-68.

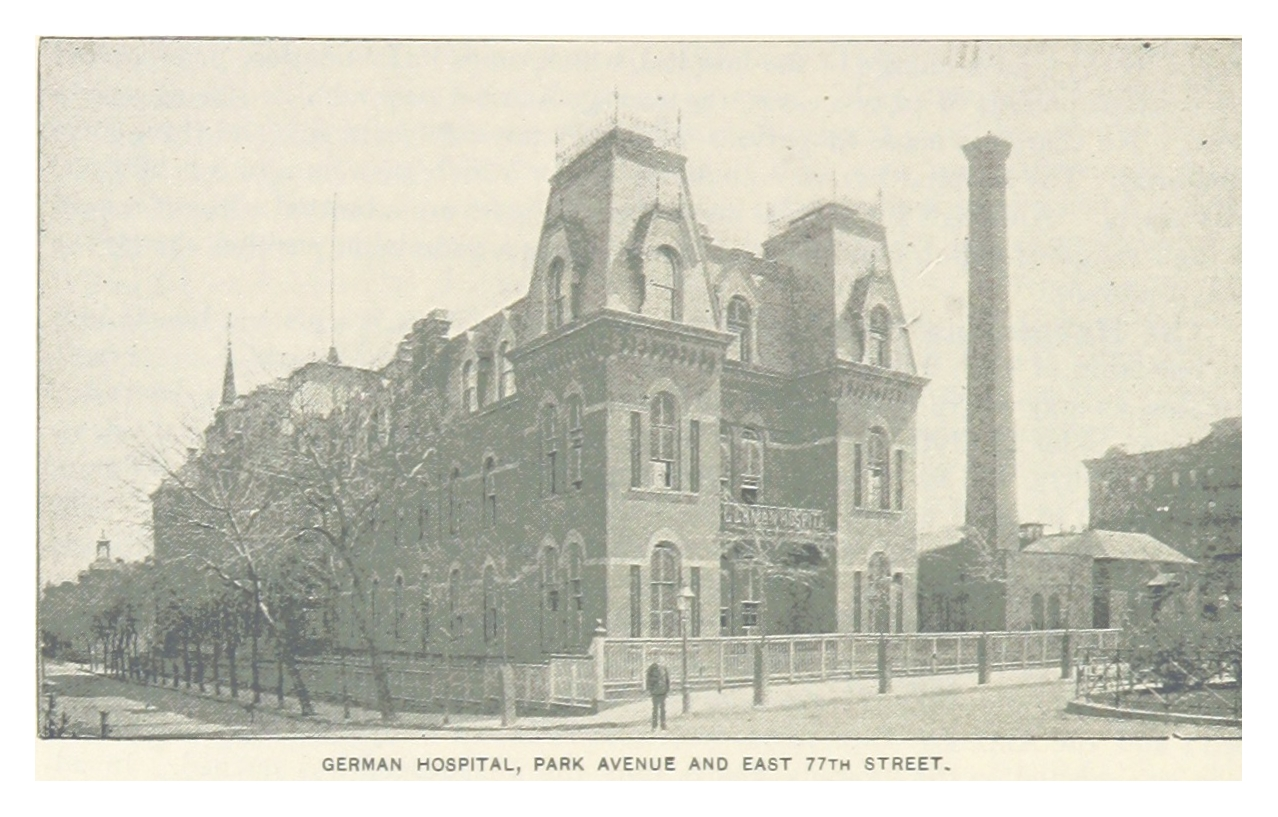
German Hospital, New York City, 1867.

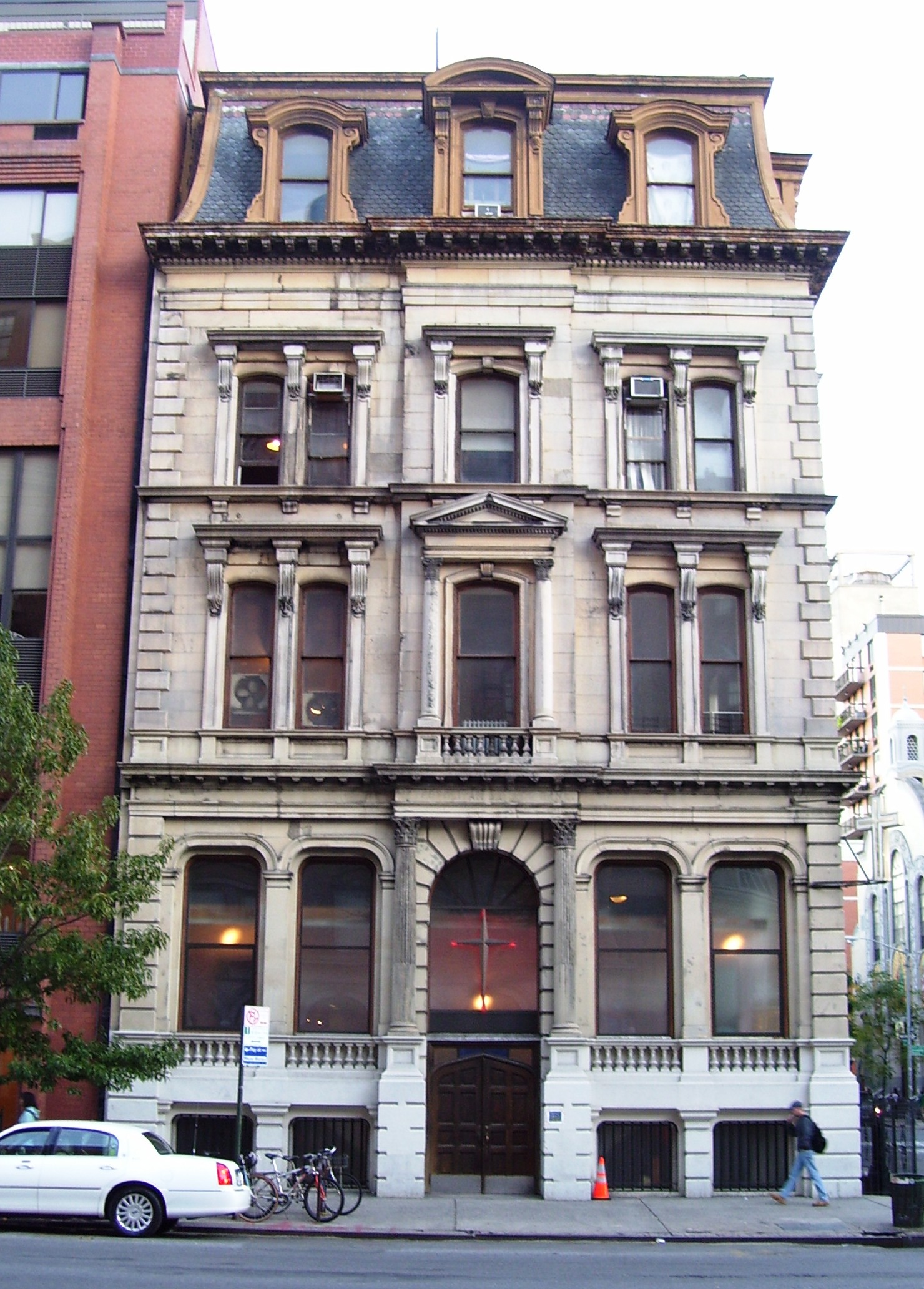
Metropolitan Savings Bank Building, New York City, 1867.

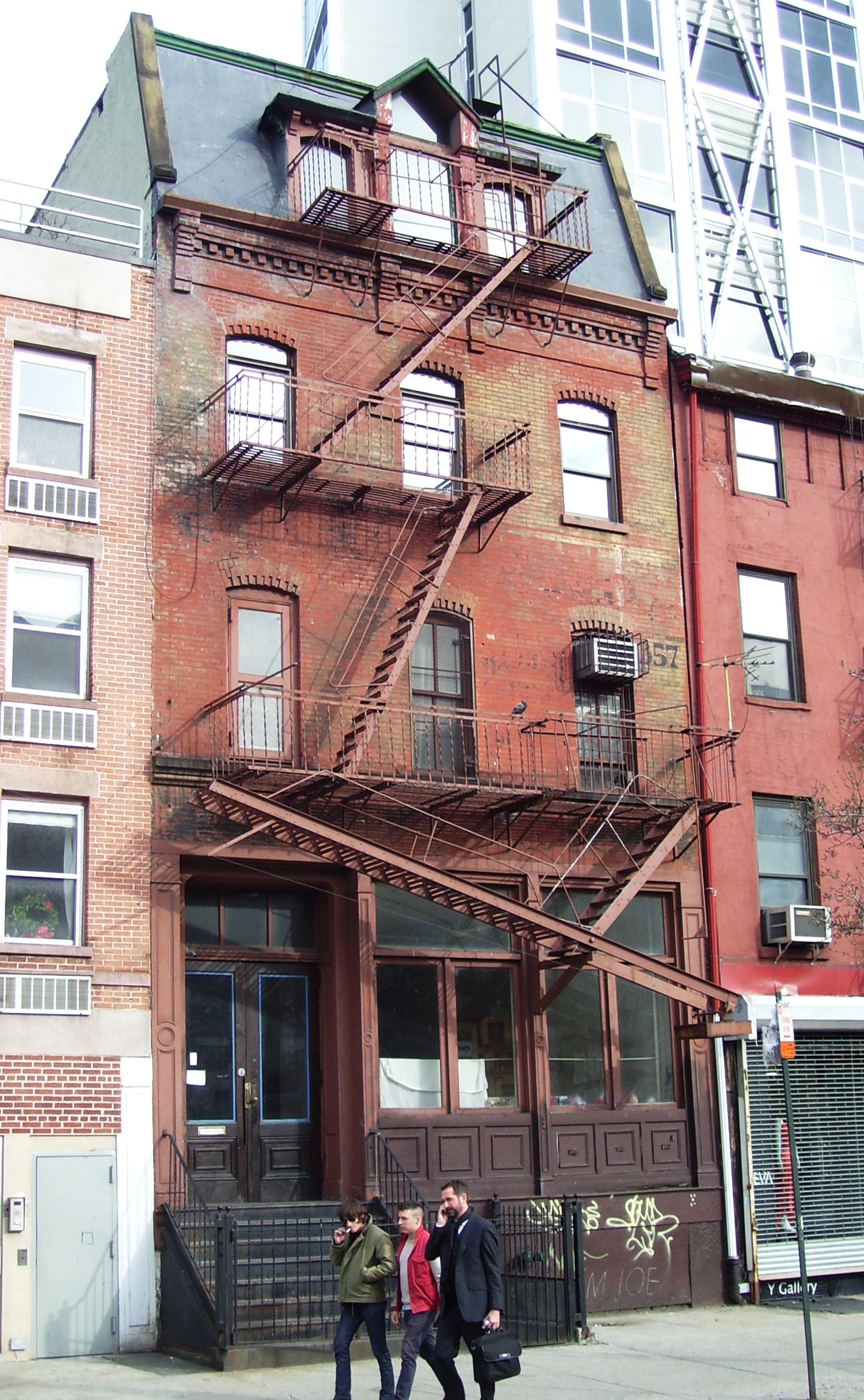
Germania Fire Insurance Company Bowery Building, New York City, 1870.

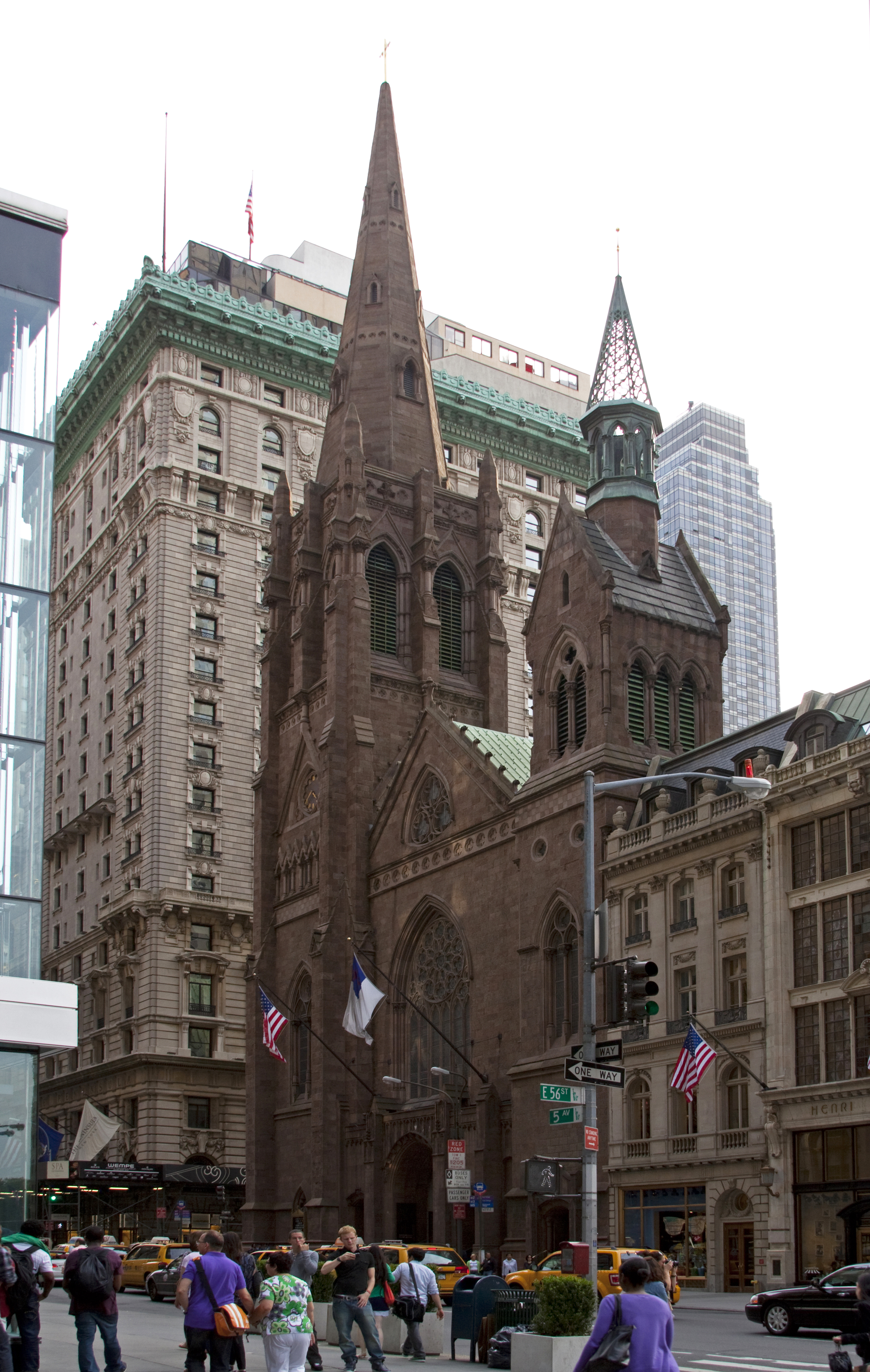
Fifth Avenue Presbyterian Church, New York City, 1873-75.

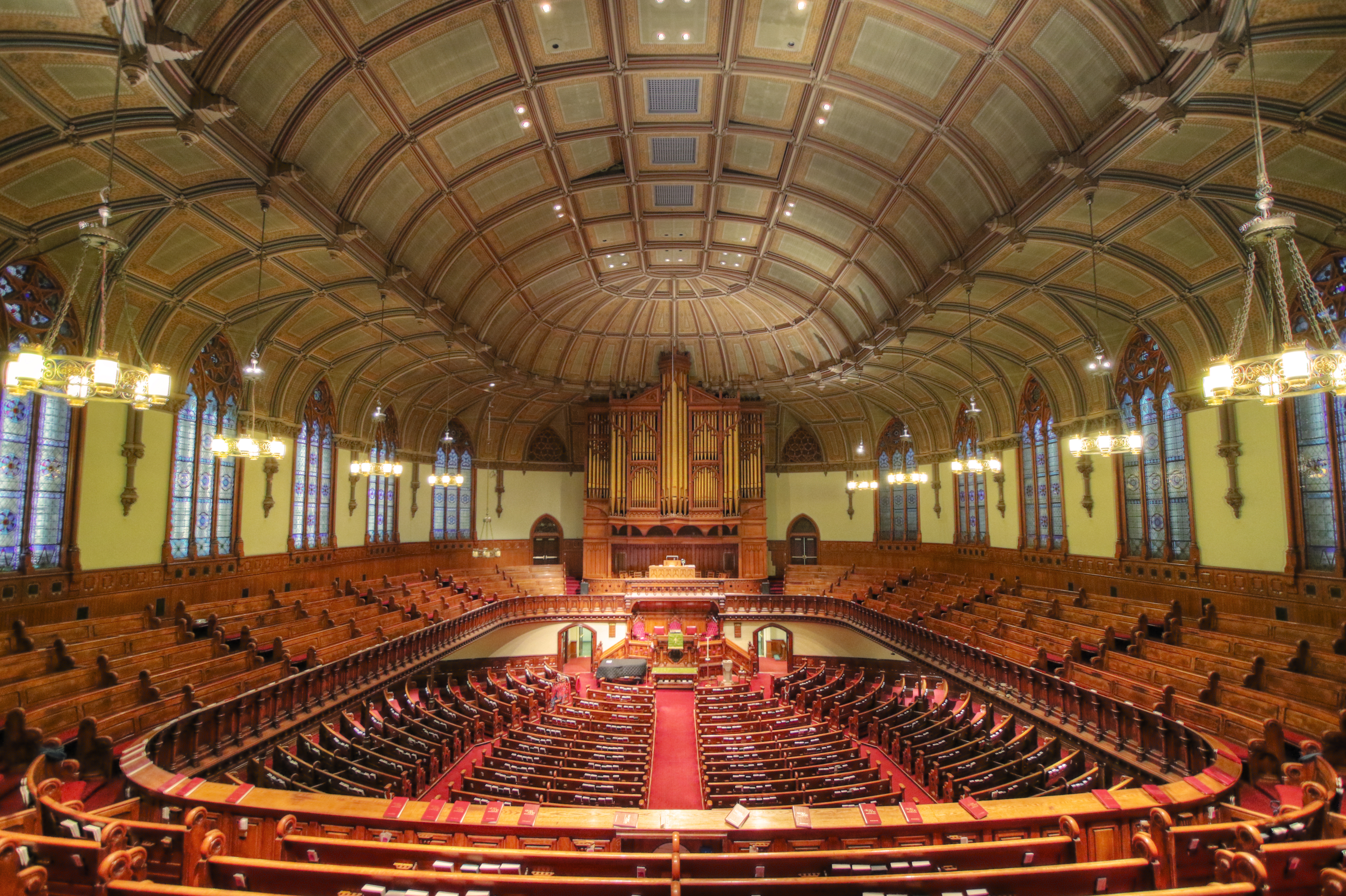
Interior view of the Fifth Avenue Presbyterian Church, New York City, 1873-75.

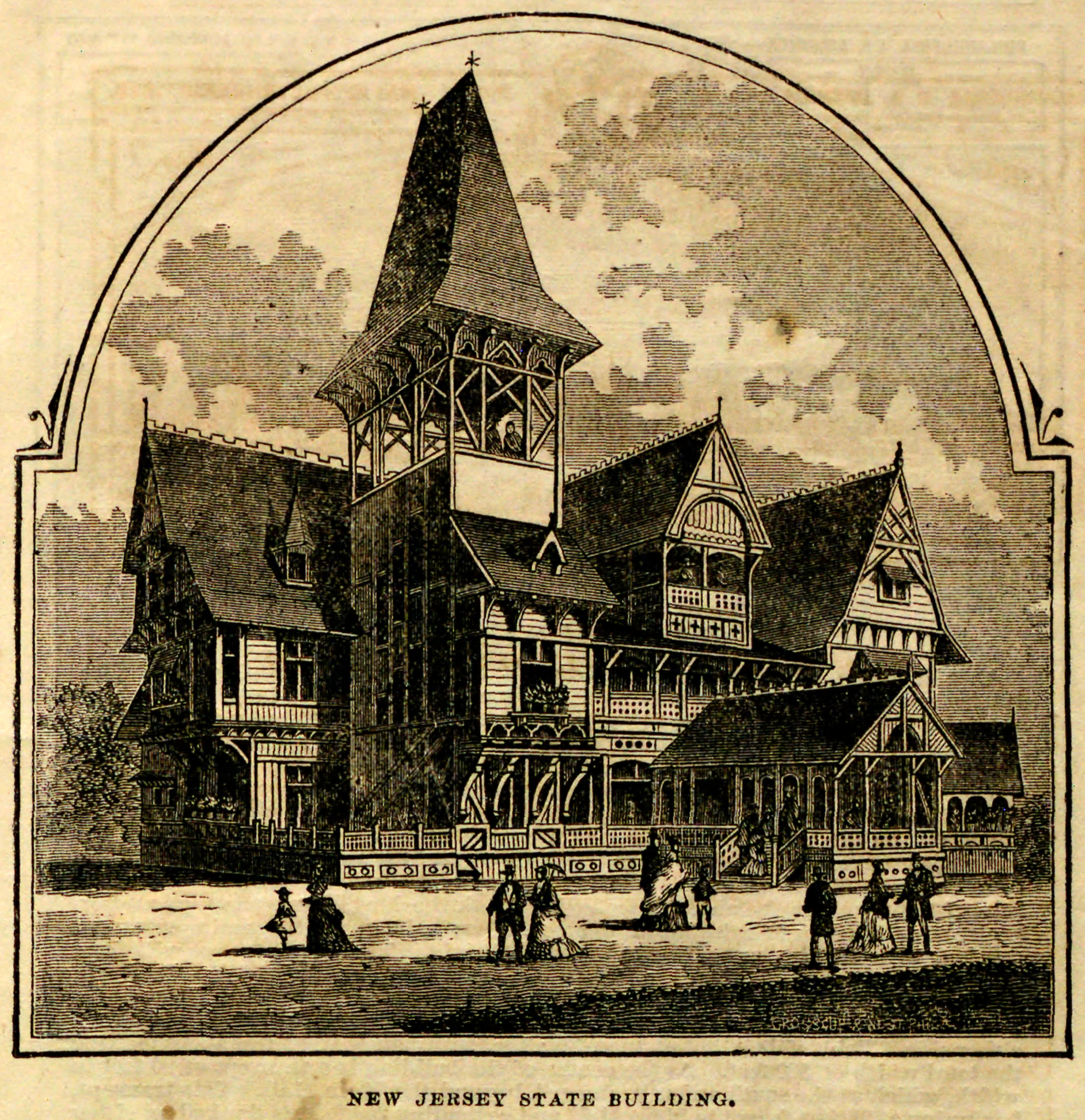
New Jersey Building, Centennial Exposition, Philadelphia, Pennsylvania, 1876.

== Bibliography ==
- Carl Pfeiffer, American Mansions and Cottages (Boston: Ticknor, 1889) (Note: Published posthumously.)

== See also ==
- Hamilton Park, Staten Island
