= New Theatre Comique =

Defunct theater in New York City

Coordinates: 40.72939°N 73.99317°W

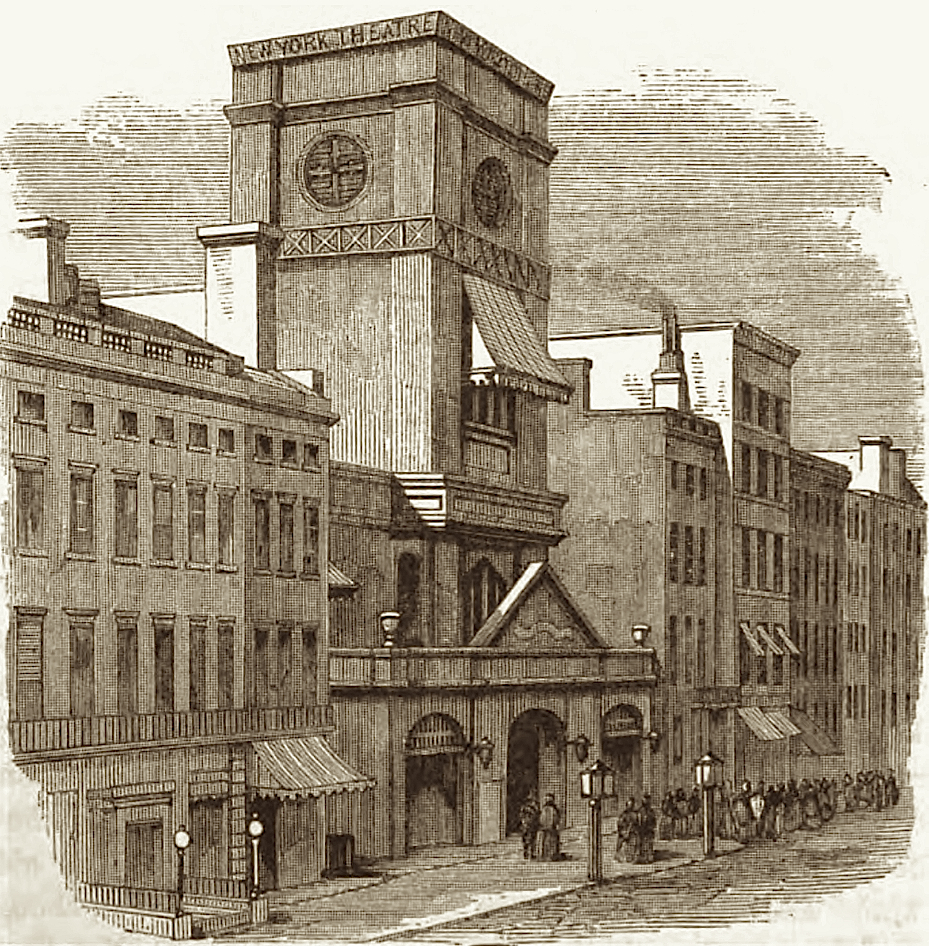
- 1868 drawing of a street scene in front of the altered but recognizable exterior of the church
- Interactive map of the New Theatre Comique area

General information
- Location: 728–730 Broadway, Manhattan, New York City
- Completed: 1839
- Opened: 1864
- Demolished: 1884

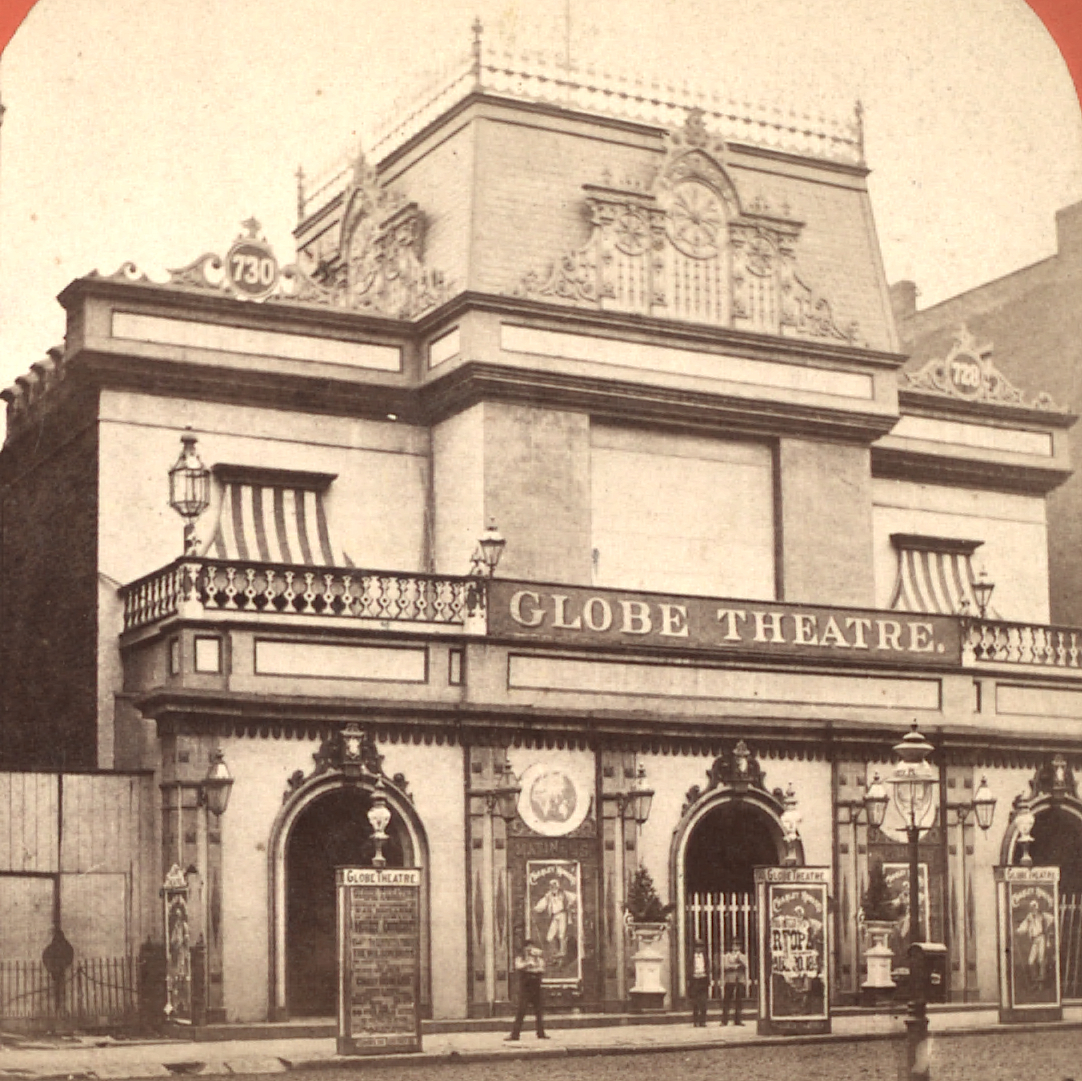
As the Globe Theatre

The Church of the Messiah at 728–30 Broadway, near Waverly Place in Greenwich Village, Manhattan, New York City, was dedicated in 1839 and operated as a church until 1864. In January 1865 it was sold to department store magnate Alexander Turney Stewart and converted into a theater, which subsequently operated under a series of names, including Globe Theatre, and ending with New Theatre Comique. It burned down in 1884.

== Theater names and managers ==
The following information comes from Brown (page numbers in parentheses):

- 1865, January 23 – Broadway Athenaeum (A. T. Stewart, owner; James H. Hackett, manager) (376–77)
- 1865, December 23 – Lucy Rushton's Theatre (Lucy Rushton, proprietor and manager) (377)
- 1866, September 5 – New York Theatre (Lewis Baker and Mark Smith, managers) (379)
- 1867, May 6 – The Worrell Sisters' New York Theatre (M. L. Finch, manager) (383)
- 1868, August 3 – New York Theatre (Alvin Lloyd, manager) (386)
- 1868, November 4 – The Worrell Sisters' Theatre (387)
- 1870, October 3 – Globe Theatre (Josh Hart, manager) (388)
- 1879 – Globe Theatre (Edward Eddy, manager) (389)
- 1871 – Nixon's Amphitheatre (James M. Nixon, manager) (389)
- 1872, April 7 – Broadway Theatre (Jean Burnside, manager) (390)
- 1873, January 21 – Daly's Fifth Avenue Theatre (Augustin Daly, manager) (390)
- 1873, August 25 – Daly's Broadway Theatre (Augustin Daly, manager) (391)
- 1874, April 6 – Fox's Broadway Theatre (G. A. Swalm, proprietor; George H. Tyler, manager) (393)
- 1874, August 3 – Globe Theatre (Robert W. Butler, manager) (393)
- 1874, November 2 – Globe Theatre (James Campbell and Frank Murtha, managers) (393)
- 1876, January 25 – Globe Theatre (Charles Shay, manager) (394)
- 1876, August 25 – Globe Theatre (Robert Butler, manager) (394)
- 1876, October 25 – Globe Theatre (Tallmadge & Scofield, proprietors; Robert W. Butler and C. W. Shafer, managers) (394)
- 1876, November 15 – Heller's Wonder Theatre (Robert Heller, manager) (394)
- 1877, July 30 – Wood's Theatre (George Wood, manager) (394)
- 1877, September 10 – Neil Bryant's Opera House (Andrew Bleakley, manager) (394)
- 1877, December 24 – National Theatre (394–95)
- 1878, September 9 – Globe Theatre (Harry Weston, manager) (396)
- 1878, December 14 – Globe Theatre (Frank B. Murtha, manager) (396)
- 1879, October 20 – New York Circus (Lewis B. Lent, manager) (397)
- 1879, October [?] – Broadway Novelty Theatre (Professor Nelson and J. Z. Little, manager) (397)
- 1881, October 29 – New Theatre Comique (Harrigan and Hart, proprietors; John E. Cannon, manager) (397)
- 1884, December 23 [Destroyed by fire] (398)
