= Brady v. Daly =

- Supreme Court of the United States

Argued October 18, 1899 Decided November 20, 1899
- Full case name: Brady v. Daly
- Citations: 175 U.S. 148 (more) 20 S. Ct. 62; 44 L. Ed. 109

Holding
- The common law circuit court did have jurisdiction over the copyright infringement case because the statutory damages were not a penalty or forfeiture.

Court membership
- Chief Justice Melville Fuller Associate Justices John M. Harlan · Horace Gray; David J. Brewer · Henry B. Brown; George Shiras Jr. · Edward D. White; Rufus W. Peckham · Joseph McKenna

Brady v. Daly, 175 U.S. 148 (1899), was a United States Supreme Court case in which the Court held the common law circuit court did have jurisdiction over the copyright infringement case because the statutory damages were not a penalty or forfeiture.

This case is related to Webster v. Daly. They arose from the same set of copyright infringement disputes regarding Under the Gaslight by Augustin Daly.

The United States abolished the circuit court system involved in Webster v. Daly in 1912. The modern analog would be the district courts.
