= Webster v. Daly =

- Supreme Court of the United States

Argued April 30, 1896 Decided May 18, 1896
- Full case name: Webster v. Daly
- Citations: 163 U.S. 155 (more) 16 S. Ct. 961; 41 L. Ed. 111

Holding
- The Supreme Court did not have jurisdiction over cases appealed from the circuit courts.

Court membership
- Chief Justice Melville Fuller Associate Justices Stephen J. Field · John M. Harlan; Horace Gray · David J. Brewer; Henry B. Brown · George Shiras Jr. Edward D. White · Rufus W. Peckham

Case opinion
- Majority: Fuller, joined by unanimous
- Brewer and Peckham took no part in the consideration or decision of the case.

Webster v. Daly, 163 U.S. 155 (1896), was a United States Supreme Court case in which the Court held that the Supreme Court did not have jurisdiction over cases appealed from the circuit courts. The case was dismissed.

This case was related to Brady v. Daly. They arose from the same set of copyright infringement disputes regarding Under the Gaslight by Augustin Daly.

The United States abolished the circuit court system involved in Webster v. Daly in 1912. The modern analog is the district courts.
