= Rosana Logan =

Child actor in silent films

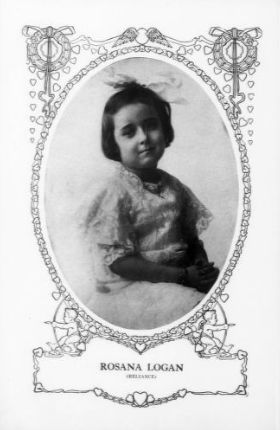
- Born: 21 January 1905; New York, NY
- Died: June 1967 (aged 62); Dade, Florida

Rosana Logan (1905 – 1967), sometimes listed as Rosanna Logan, was a child actor in silent short films made by the Reliance Motion Picture Corporation, then known as the Reliance Stock Company.

== Early life ==
She was born January 21, 1905, the daughter of Katharine W. De Forest (1888-1975), a writer for Harper's Bazaar, and John Logan (1875-unknown). She had a brother, Thomas Joseph Logan, born in 1908, who died in 1976. It is unknown if her parents divorced or her father died. Her mother later married John M. Liesch, a World War I veteran and US Army sergeant, and both are buried in Arlington National Cemetery.

== Film career ==
Logan was occasionally known as "Baby Rosana," sometimes misspelled Rosanna (see misspelling section below). She appeared in Solomon's Son (1912), Half a Chance (1913), The Wager (1913), Diversion (1913), The Dream Home (1913), His Fireman's Conscience (1914), and Under the Gaslight (1914). In 1914 she was in the play "The Revolt," a melodrama in three acts by Edward Locke, touring the northeast; it was later made into a 1916 film. She played the part of the dying child, Nannie Stevens in the stage play, but not the film. As a ten-year-old she was in the film The Lady of Dreams (1915).

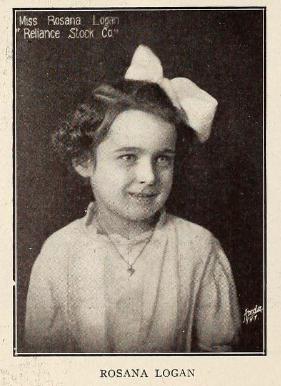
Rosana Logan in 1912

== Personal life ==
On June 27, 1929, she married Joel Gutman Cahn (1885-1950) in a ceremony at All Saints' Episcopal Church in Bayside, Queens. He had previously married Constance Stern in 1910, and it is unknown when they divorced; she died in 1975. Joel and Constance had one son, Chester, in 1914, and he and Rosana had a son, Robert, born in 1933. Joel and Rosana lived in Flushing, Queens. Joel Cahn was a stockbroker who died in 1950 at age 65 when he crashed his car into a tree in New York. Rosana remarried in 1951 to John J. Kelly. She died in June, 1967, in Dade, Florida. Rosana and her mother Katharine showed chihuahuas bred by Mathilde M. Shaw of Flushing, New York, "Rosana's Bonita," and "Liesch's Ginger" (both 1950).

== Misspelling and age change ==
Her first name is often misspelled Rosanna (in IMDB, Ancestry, and some film reference books and movie magazines), but it was consistently spelled Rosana in her publicity photos, in the New York Times announcement of her first marriage, and on official documents.

Additionally, her stated age fluctuated. Some sources give her birth date as 1907 rather than 1905, and either she or her parents may have lowered her age by two or more years for the demands of the film industry. For example, in 1914 she is listed as being six, when she probably would have been closer to nine but was small for her age. Yet another film magazine in 1913 lists her as four, when she would have been at least twice that.
