= Community Church of New York =

Unitarian congregation in Manhattan, New York

Church of the Messiah I
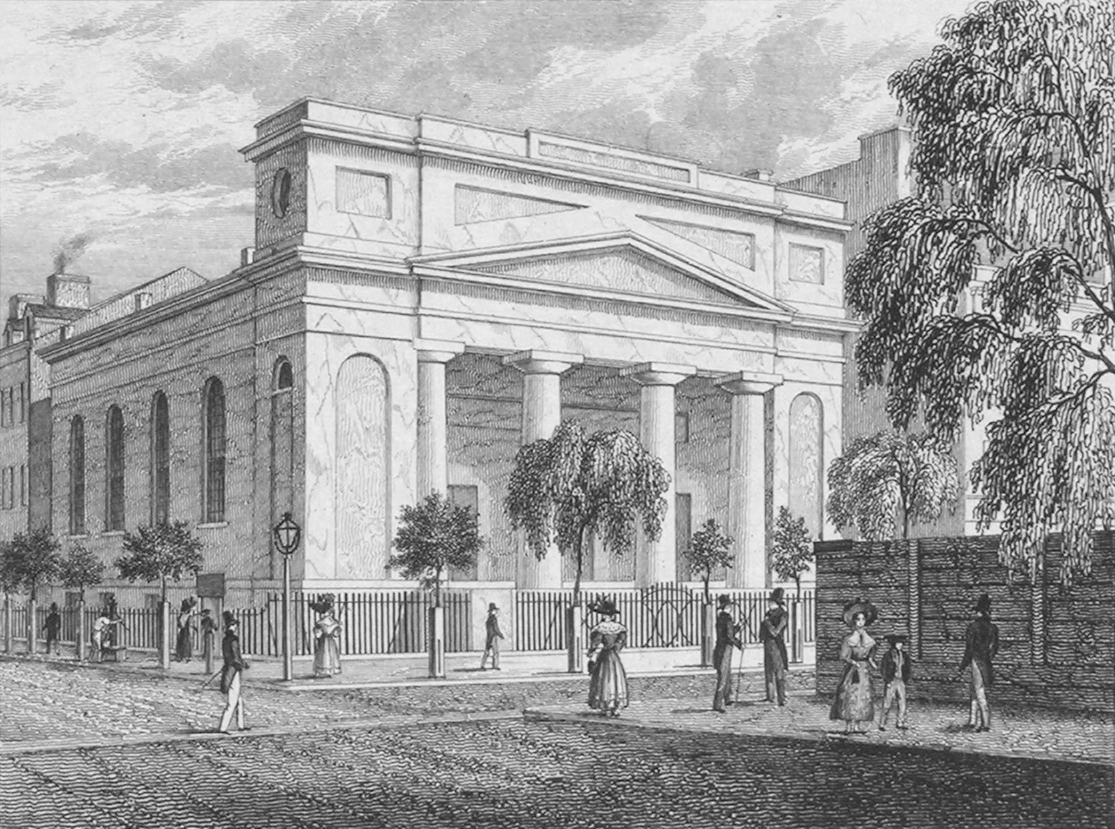
- 1826–37, Mercer and Prince Streets

General information
- Architectural style: Greek Revival
- Location: Manhattan, New York City
- Coordinates: 40.72940°N 73.99313°W
- Opened: 1826
- Demolished: 1837

Design and construction
- Architect: Josiah R. Brady

Church of the Messiah II
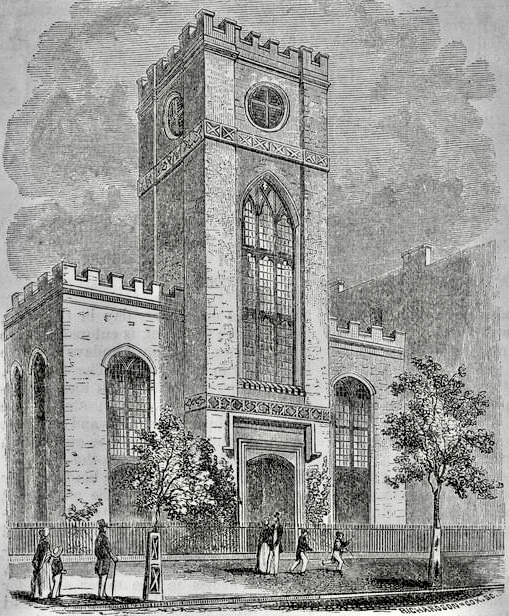
- 1839–65, Broadway at Waverly Place

General information
- Architectural style: Romanesque Revival
- Location: Manhattan, New York City
- Coordinates: 40.72486°N 73.99866°W
- Opened: 1839
- Demolished: 1865

Church of the Messiah III
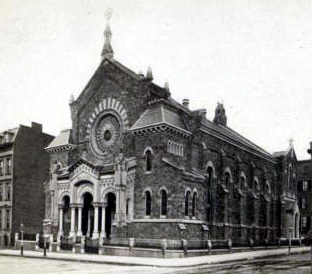
- 1867–1930, 34th Street and Park Avenue

General information
- Architectural style: Romanesque Revival
- Location: Manhattan, New York City
- Coordinates: 40.74753°N 73.98160°W
- Opened: 1867
- Demolished: 1930

Design and construction
- Architect: Carl Pfeiffer

The Community Church of New York was founded in 1825 as the Second Congregational Church in New York. In 1919, the congregation joined the Community Church movement (of which Rev. John Haynes Holmes, then Senior Minister of the church, was a leading architect) and changed its name to the Community Church of New York. The church is notable for its commitments to social justice and anti-war movements, which continue to form an important part of its programming and identity today. During the 20th century, the Community Church of New York hosted speeches and debates by countless important thinkers and leaders such as Nelson Mandela, Martin Luther King, Jr., Malcolm X, Bayard Rustin, James Baldwin, June Jordan, and W.E.B DuBois.

From 1948 until 2022, the congregation was housed at 40 East 35th Street. As of 2026, the church offices are located on East 35th Street, and services are held at the neighboring Church of the Incarnation. The Community Church of New York is a member of the Unitarian Universalist Association.

== Origins ==
The first Unitarian Society in New York was founded May 24, 1819, and incorporated on November 15 under the name "First Congregational Church in the City of New York" (later "Unitarian Church of All Souls"), although there had been between three and five congregational churches in the city before that. On January 20, 1821, the congregation dedicated a newly built church on Chambers Street, west of Church Street.

By 1825, the church had become crowded, and many of the pew holders lived above Canal Street. On March 19, a meeting was held to unite locals in building a church there for Unitarian worship, and the Second Congregational Unitarian Society was formed. The group built a church on the northwest corner of Prince and Mercer Streets, opening on December 7, 1826. William Ellery Channing preached a sermon and William Cullen Bryant, a member of the congregation, wrote a hymn for the occasion. Designed by Josiah R. Brady, the edifice was one of the earliest Greek Revival buildings in New York.

Orville Dewey became pastor in 1835, a position he held until 1848. During his tenure, the church building was completely destroyed by fire on November 26, 1837. The congregation took temporary quarters until May 2, 1839, when their new church, which they called Church of the Messiah, opened for worship at 728–30 Broadway, opposite Waverly Place.

In January 1865, that church was sold to department store magnate A. T. Stewart and converted into a theater, which subsequently operated under a series of names, including Globe Theatre, and ending with New Theatre Comique. It burned down in 1884.

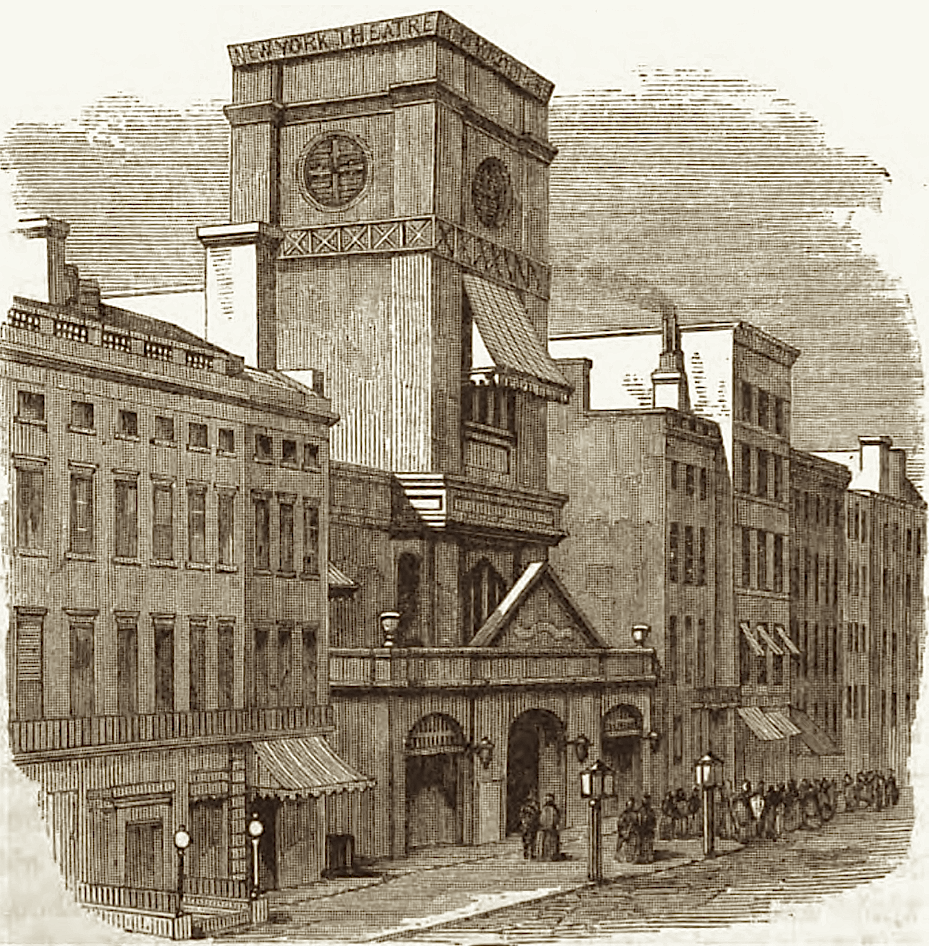
Renovated Church of the Messiah/2nd Unitarian Church Building in 1865.

== 34th Street ==
The congregation's third church, located on 34th Street at the northwest corner of Fourth Avenue (Park Avenue), was inaugurated in 1867. It was designed in Victorian Romanesque style by Carl Pfeiffer.

In 1906, the church called John Haynes Holmes as its minister. At 27 years old, Holmes was installed in 1907.

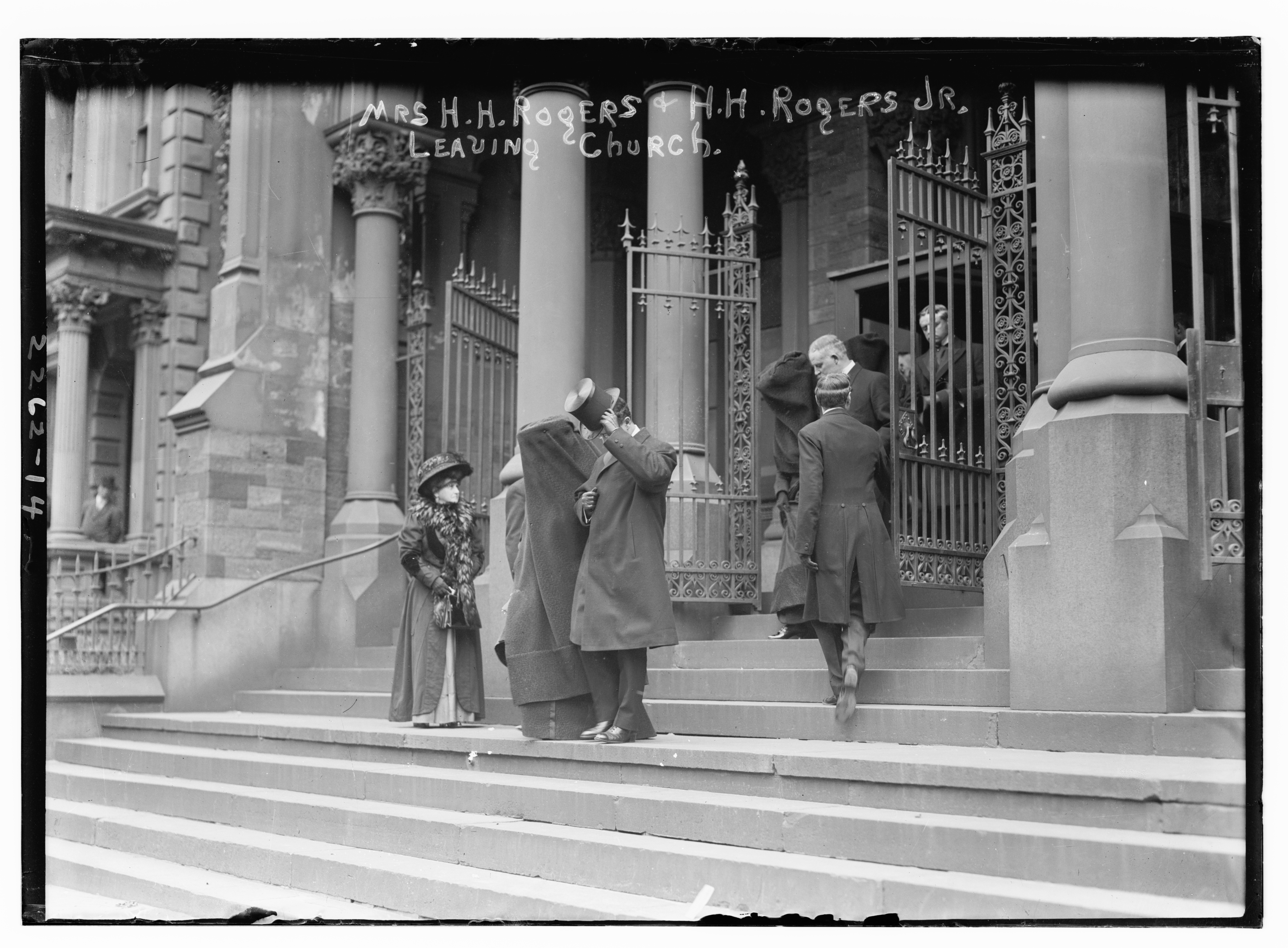
Funeral of Henry Huttleston Rogers

In 1909, Holmes accepted an invitation from W. E. B. Du Bois to join the founding circle of the National Association for the Advancement of Colored People (NAACP). The following year, the church welcomed its first Black congregant, Horace Dudley, whom Holmes invited to become an usher. On May 21, 1909, funeral services were held for railroad magnate Henry Huttleston Rogers.

In 1919, the congregation renamed itself the Community Church of New York amid reforms led by Holmes. These included removing pew ownership, granting the minister freedom of the pulpit, leaving the Unitarian denomination, and joining the Community Church movement. The church also declared itself pacifist, opposing war and violence. Holmes said:

I have left Unitarianism, cut myself off from all denominational connections of every kind, that I may preach a universal, humanistic religion which knows no bounds of any kind, not even Christianity. We have … placed the support of the church on the … basis of free voluntary subscriptions. We have rewritten our covenant, eliminating every last vestige of theology, thus relegating all matters of belief to private individual opinion. … [Any person] is welcome to our church, whether he be rich or poor, black or white, Christian, Jew, Hindu, or Parsee.

== Mid-20th-century developments ==
A new building on 35th Street was constructed in the late 1940s and dedicated in 1948, envisioned as a permanent home for the Community Church of New York. The dedication ceremony was attended by numerous dignitaries, including Jawaharlal Nehru, Governor Dewey, and Rabbi Stephen Samuel Wise.

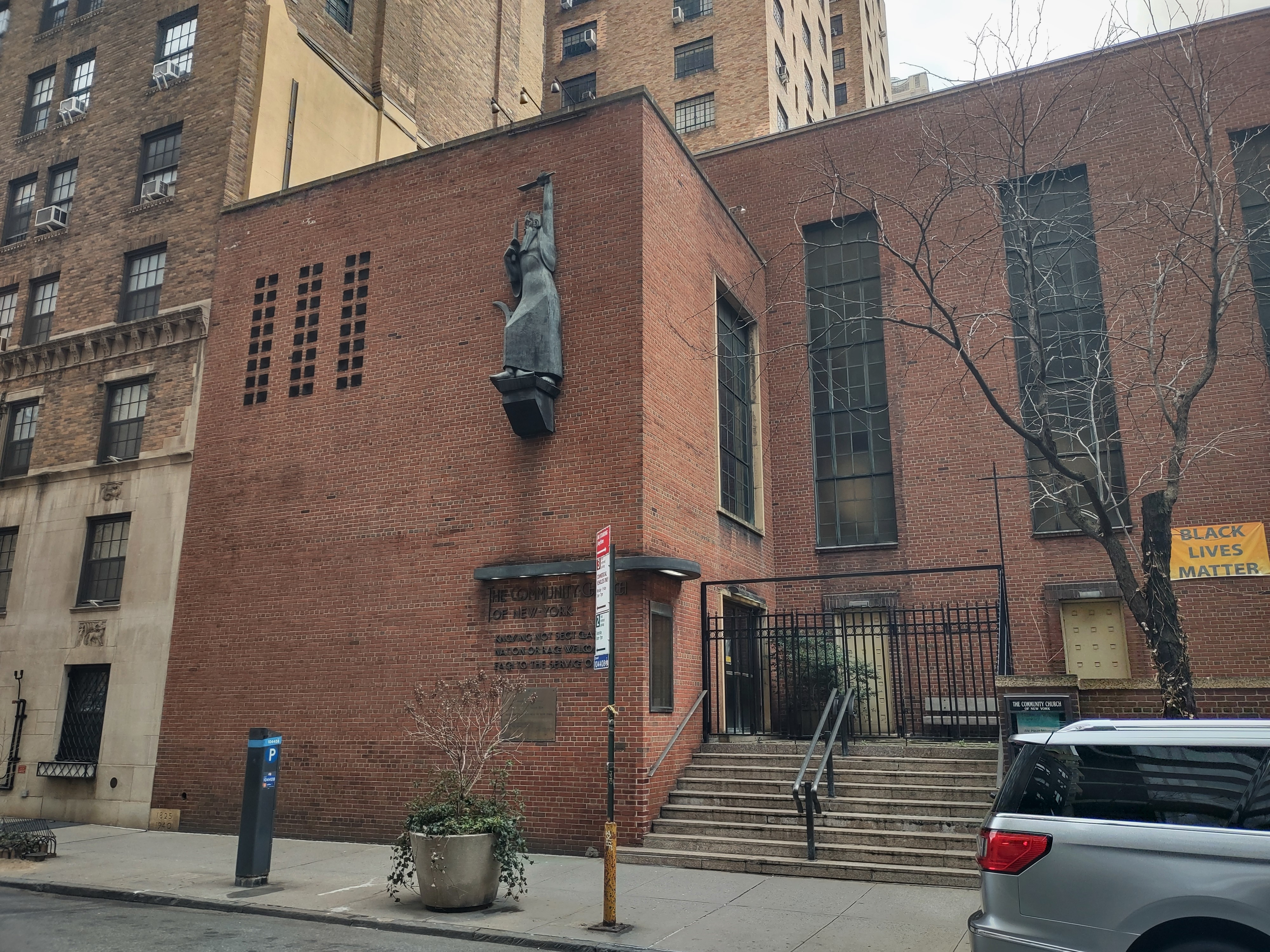
40 East 35th Street

In 1949, John Haynes Holmes officially retired, succeeded by Donald Szantho Harrington as senior minister. The church continued its commitment to social justice, with dozens of congregants participating in the March on Washington and Harrington stepping forward as a prominent activist in favor of civil rights and equality for African Americans. In 1960, the church hosted a debate between Malcolm X and Bayard Rustin, showcasing the two civil rights leaders’ differing visions for the path to equality and justice between Black and white people in the United States. In 1965, Harrington, along with other liberal religious leaders, spent 17 days in Alabama supporting the Selma marchers.

== Late 20th-century and beyond ==
The church maintained its progressive stance throughout the latter half of the 20th century, supporting causes such as the anti-apartheid movement and LGBTQ+ rights. In the 1970s, the American Committee on Africa was formed and hosted with the support of the church, which served as a home base for the organization until the release of leader Nelson Mandela from South African prison. In 1990, Nelson Mandela spoke at the church shortly after his release, thanking American anti-apartheid activists for their support.

In 1982, Donald Harrington stood down as senior minister, and the congregation called his successor, Bruce Southworth. Throughout the 1980s, the church and its leadership continued their dedication to fighting against apartheid in South Africa. Southworth went on to serve as an election monitor in Soweto, South Africa in 1994.

The church was recognized as an LGBT Welcoming Congregation by the Unitarian Universalist Association in 1997, and witnessed its first same-sex commitment ceremony in 1998. In 2019, congregation called its first woman to the position of senior minister, Peggy Clarke.

In 2024, the church sold its property from 26–34 East 35th Street to a real estate development firm for $66.2 million, which planned to construct a residential condominium building on the site.
