= Metropolitan Savings Bank Building =

- Metropolitan Savings Bank
- U.S. National Register of Historic Places
- New York State Register of Historic Places
- New York City Landmark
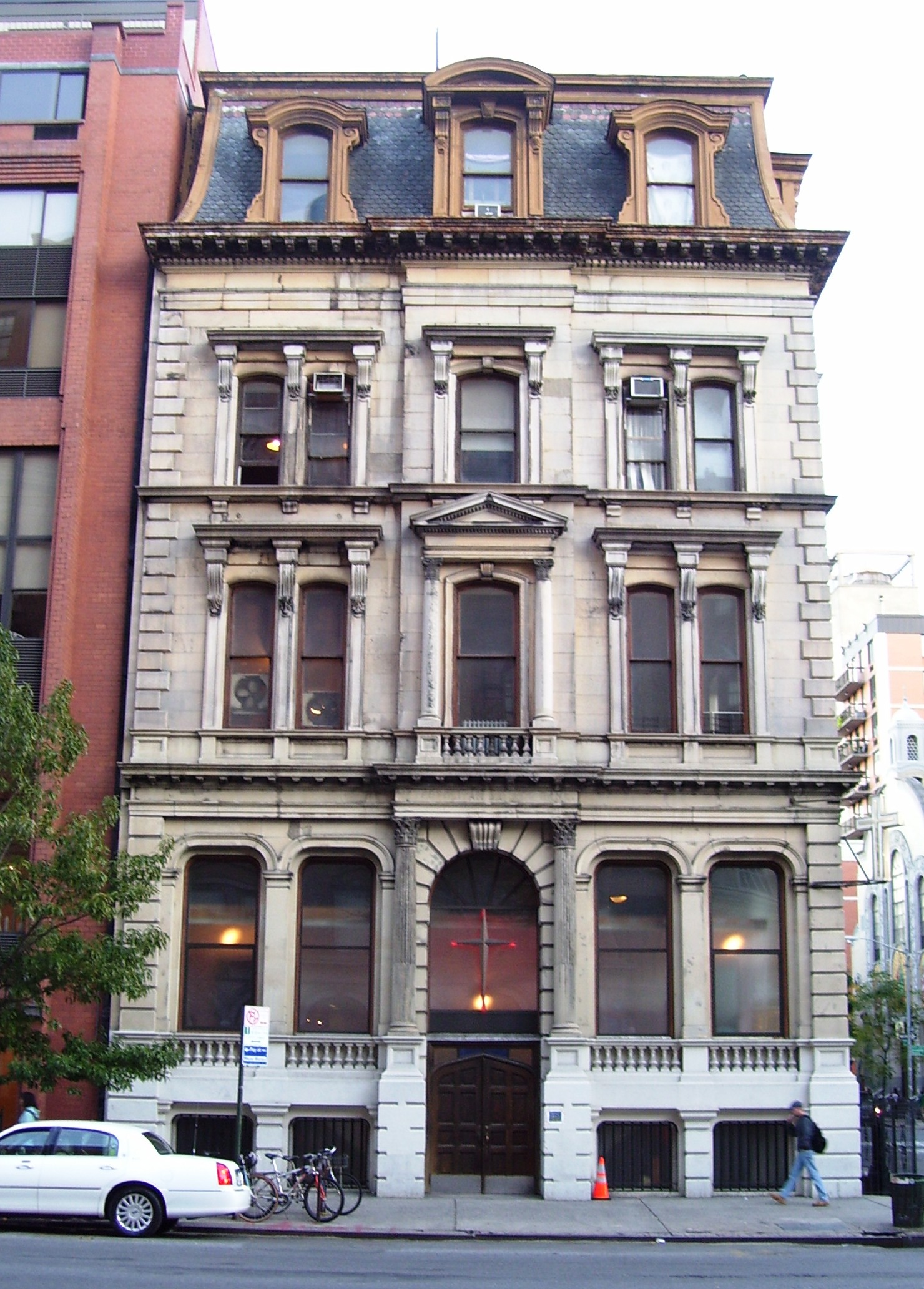
- 2010
- Location: 9 E. 7th St., New York, New York
- Coordinates: 40°43′44″N 73°59′24″W
- Area: less than one acre
- Built: 1867
- Architect: Pfeiffer, Carl
- Architectural style: Second Empire
- NRHP reference No.: 76001243
- NYSRHP No.: 06101.000145
- NYCL No.: 0183

Significant dates
- Added to NRHP: December 12, 1976
- Designated NYSRHP: June 23, 1980
- Designated NYCL: November 19, 1969

The Metropolitan Savings Bank Building opened on May 30, 1867, at the northeast corner of Third Avenue and East 7th Street, in Manhattan, New York City. Its original address was 10 Cooper Institute (now 61 Cooper Square). The building, which was designed by architect Carl Pfeiffer in Second Empire style, is four stories high, 45 feet (14 m) wide and 75 feet (23 m) deep, and was considered at the time it opened to be one of the most finely constructed edifices, "from garret to basement." Its facades were composed of white marble, with the upper floor being enclosed by a mansard roof. The building was fireproof, as no combustible materials were used during construction, either internally or externally. The entire cost of the structure was $150,000.

The Metropolitan Savings Bank was chartered in New York in 1852. In 1935 the bank moved its headquarters from Cooper Square to 754 Broadway. In 1942, it merged with the Manhattan Savings Institution (founded 1852) and the Citizens Savings Bank to form the Manhattan Savings Bank. In 1990, Edmund Safra's Republic National Bank bought the Manhattan Savings Bank, and was in turn purchased by HSBC in 1999.

The building was designated a New York City Landmark in 1969, and was added to the National Register of Historic Place in 1979.

== Interior design ==
The main hall was 53.5 feet (16.3 m) in length, and 36.83 feet (11.23 m) wide. Its height was 17.33 feet (5.28 m). Its acoustic properties were excellent.

Black walnut was used inside for building desks, chairs, and stairways. The office furniture evoked a simple design and reflected excellent taste The President's room, located behind the banking house proper, was less spacious, as offices were given the maximum space. Another feature of the interior was its immense safe.

== Lessees ==
The fireproof construction of the Metropolitan Savings Bank enabled the rapid renting of any free space not used by the bank. The basement and cellar beneath it was leased for ten years to the Stuyvesant Safe Deposit Company. The floor just above the bank was leased by the United States Assessor of Internal Revenue. The third floor, unlet when the building first opened, was rented for a decade by the Eastern Star Lodge of Freemasons.

== Later uses ==
In 1937, the building was sold to the First Ukrainian Assembly of God, and it has been used since that time as a church, most recently by the First Ukrainian Evangelical Pentecostal Church.
