= Augustin Daly =

American theater impresario (1838–1899)

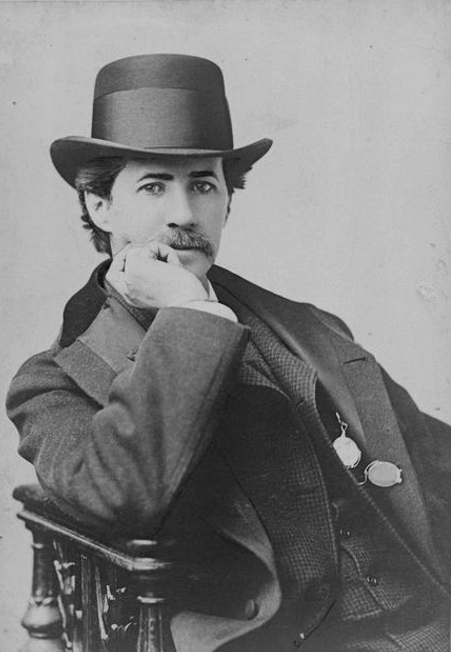
- Born: John Augustin Daly; July 20, 1838; Plymouth, North Carolina, U.S.
- Died: June 7, 1899 (aged 60); Paris, France
- Occupations: Drama critic, theatre manager, playwright, theatre director

John Augustin Daly (July 20, 1838 – June 7, 1899) was an American drama critic, theater manager, playwright, and adapter, he became the first recognized stage director in America. He exercised fierce and tyrannical control over all aspects of his productions. His rules of conduct for actors and actresses imposed heavy fines for late appearances and forgotten lines and earned him the title "the autocrat of the stage." He formed a permanent company in New York and opened Daly's Theatre in New York in 1879, and a second one in London in 1893.

== Biography ==
Augustin Daly was born in Plymouth, North Carolina to Captain Denis Daly, sea-captain and ship owner, and Elizabeth, daughter of Lieutenant John Duffy of the British Army. He was educated in Norfolk, Virginia, and in the public schools of New York City. His mother, early left a widow, brought her two boys to New York City, where they soon became frequent attendants at the theaters and were members of amateur groups under such names as the "Burton Association" or the "Murdoch Association" were the precursors of the Little Theatre Movement.

He was a dramatic critic for several New York papers from 1859, and he adapted or wrote a number of plays, Under the Gaslight (1867) being his first success. In 1869 he became the manager of the Fifth Avenue Theatre on 24th St. and in 1873 the Fifth Avenue Theatre on 28th. He had a major success at the latter theatre with his 1875 play The Big Bonanza. In 1879 he rebuilt and opened Daly's Theatre on Broadway and 30th Street in New York, and, in 1893, Daly's Theatre in London.

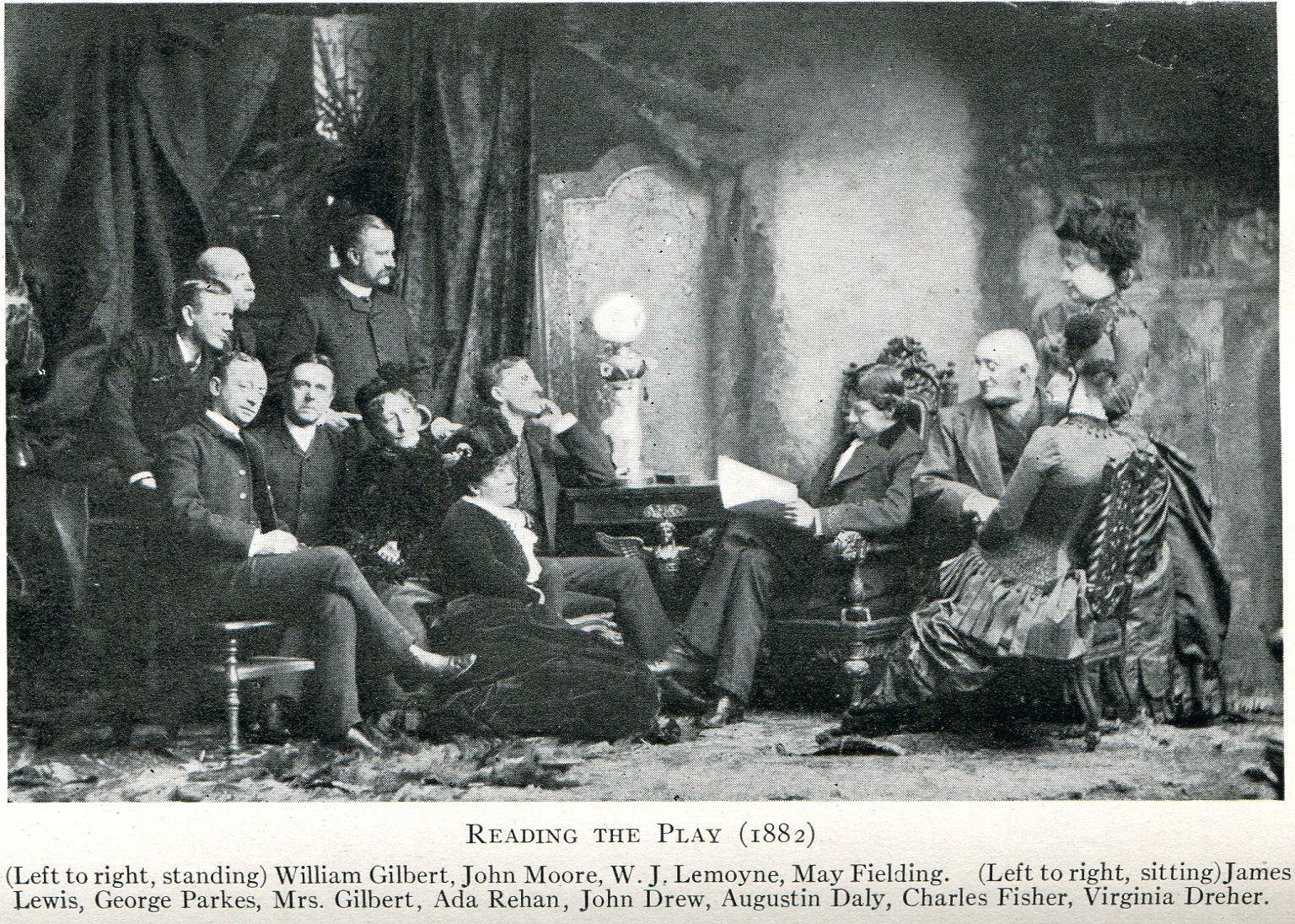
Reading The Play (1882)

At the first of these, he gathered a company of players, headed by Ada Rehan, which made for it a high reputation, and for them he adapted plays from foreign sources, and revived Shakespearean comedies in a manner before unknown in America. He took his entire company on tour, visiting England, Germany and France, and some of the best actors on the American stage have owed their training and first successes to him. Among these were Clara Morris, Sara Jewett, John Drew, Jr., Maurice Barrymore, Fanny Davenport, Agnes Ethel, Maude Adams, Mrs. Gilbert, Tyrone Power, Sr., Ada Dyas, Isadora Duncan, Maud Jeffries and many others. Daly's willingness to, as he put it, "stoop to the curb and bestow upon the low, untried actor a chance at greatness" earned him the nickname "Little Man Auggie" among his peers. His play Leah the Forsaken, adapted from Hermann Salomon Mosenthal's Deborah, was a star vehicle for Margaret Mather.

His Shakespeare productions were often severely criticized by George Bernard Shaw, who was active as a drama critic during those years. Shaw took Daly to task for cutting Shakespeare's plays and for presenting them in unorthodox ways. (Shaw was a strong believer in presenting Shakespeare's plays uncut.) Several of Shaw's criticisms of Daly's Shakespeare productions were reprinted in the anthology Shaw on Shakespeare.

He was a founding member of The Players.

In 1894, he was awarded the Laetare Medal by the University of Notre Dame, considered the most prestigious award for American Catholics.

Daly was a great book-lover, and his valuable library was dispersed by auction after his death, which occurred in Paris. Besides plays, original and adapted, he wrote Woffington: a Tribute to the Actress and the Woman (1888).

He died on 7 June 1899 in Paris aged 60 and laid to rest in Calvary Cemetery, Woodside, Queens County, New York, US.

Dora Knowlton Ranous, a onetime actress in the Daly company, published a 1910 memoir of her experiences entitled Diary of a Daly Débutante.

== Notable works ==
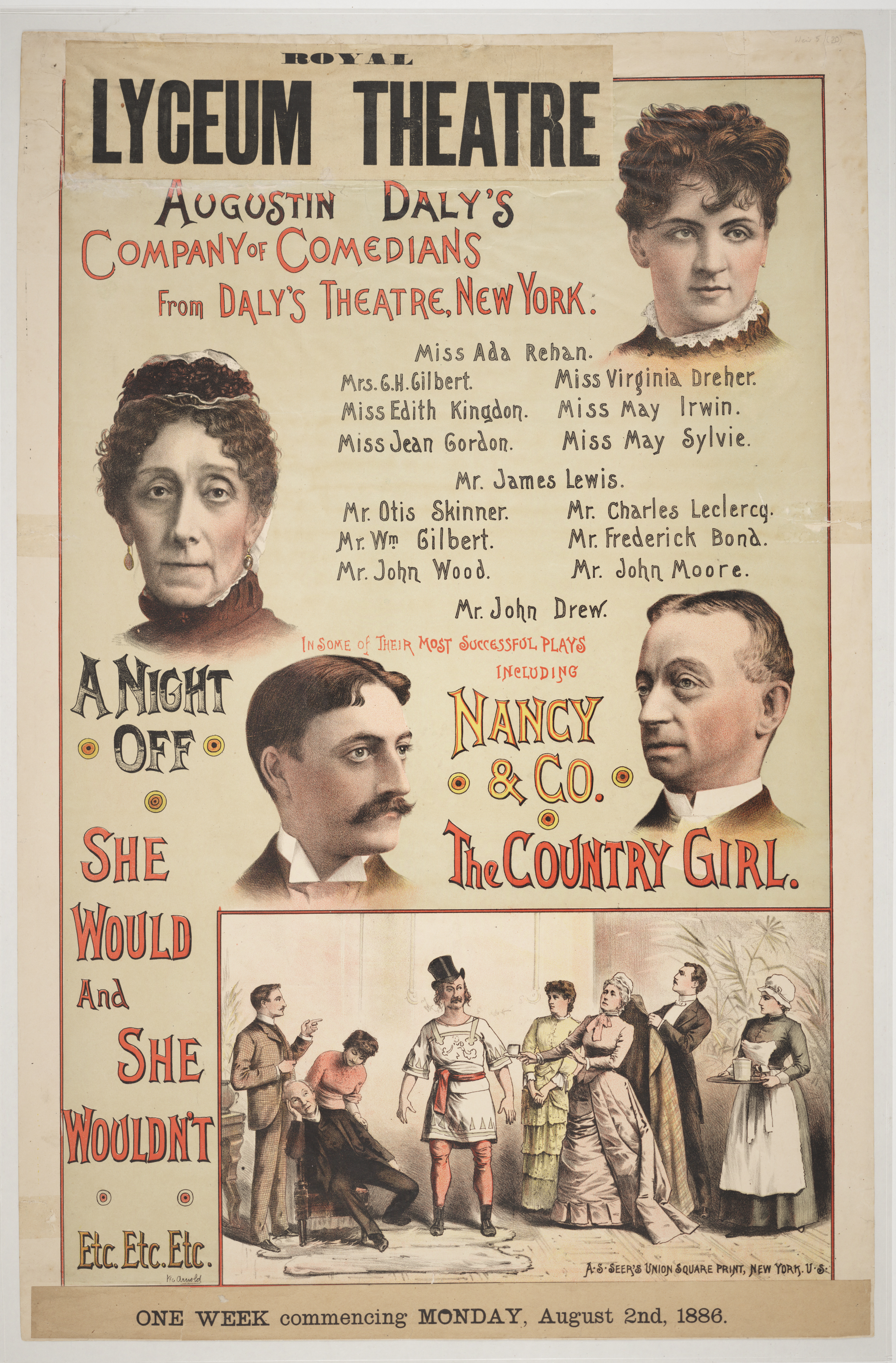
Poster from the Royal Lyceum, 1886

Under the Gaslight (1867) is an example of Daly's mixture of realism and melodrama, seen in the authenticity of his depiction of real locations and in his use of social commentary. The play introduced the now-clichéd device of the villain tying someone to railroad tracks, although in a reversal of the usual roles it was the hero who was tied up and the heroine who saved him. In the book Vagrant Memories, the author, William Winter recalls how Daly came up with the device. He says: "He once told me under what circumstances he hit upon this device. He was walking home toward night, thinking intently about the play which he had begun to write, when suddenly the crowning expedient occurred to him and at the same instant he stumbled over a misplaced flagstone, striking his right foot against the edge of the stone and sustaining a severe hurt. "I was near my door," he said, "and I rushed into the house, threw myself into a chair, grasping my injured foot with both hands, for the pain was great, and exclaiming, over and over again, 'I've got it! I've got it! And it beats hot-irons all to pieces!" I wasn't even thinking of the hurt. I had the thought of having my hero tied on a railroad track and rescued by his sweetheart, just in the nick of time, before the swift passage of an express train across a dark stage.

A Flash of Lightning (1868), like Under the Gaslight, is pure melodrama, with water and fire spectacles providing action scenes and special effects for its eager audiences.

Horizon (1871) is an adaptation of a Bret Harte story about the westward expansion of the States; it is an example of the popularity of western drama, coupled with Daly's interest in realism of the local color variety, although it remains melodramatic.

Divorce (1871) and Pique (1875), both adaptations of British novels, demonstrate Daly's attempts to create social comedy, although the plays remain somewhat melodramatic.

== See also ==
- Webster v. Daly
- Brady v. Daly

== Sources ==
- Autograph letters signed from Miriam Coles Harris to Augustin Daly (1885) Google Books
