= Buffy the Vampire Slayer season 1 =

Buffy the Vampire Slayer
- Season 1
- Region 1 Season 1 DVD cover
- Showrunner: Joss Whedon
- Starring: Sarah Michelle Gellar; Nicholas Brendon; Alyson Hannigan; Charisma Carpenter; Anthony Stewart Head
- No. of episodes: 12

Release
- Original network: The WB
- Original release: March 10 – June 2, 1997

Season chronology
- Next → Season 2

The first season of the American supernatural drama television series Buffy the Vampire Slayer originally aired between March 10 and June 2, 1997, on The WB. Conceived as a mid-season replacement, the season consists of twelve episodes, each running approximately 45 minutes in length, and originally aired on Mondays at 9:00 pm ET.

== Plot ==
Teenager Buffy Summers is the Slayer, a lone young woman chosen in each generation to be bestowed with mystical powers to fight vampires, demons, and the forces of darkness descended from the "Old Ones", the evil inhabitants of Earth before humans, who hope to rule Earth once more. Prior to the events of the season, Buffy's Slayer responsibilities caused her to lose her friends and be kicked out of her old school, Hemery High, for having burned down the gym, leading her and her mother Joyce to move to Sunnydale, where Buffy hopes to have a fresh start free of her Slayer role.

Her plans are complicated by Rupert Giles, Sunnydale High's librarian, and her new Watcher. As the Slayer's guardian and mentor, Giles reminds her of the inescapable presence of evil in the world that only she has the ability to fight. Unbeknownst to Buffy, Sunnydale is built atop the Hellmouth, a portal to demon dimensions that attracts supernatural phenomena to the area. Buffy meets two schoolmates, Xander Harris and Willow Rosenberg, who resolve to help her with her Slayer responsibilities. Together with Giles, they form the "Scooby Gang" and decide to take a combined approach to fighting demons rather than the Slayer acting alone as is traditional.

The Scoobies also receive help from Angel, a vampire cursed with a soul, whose motives are not entirely clear at first. There is romantic tension between the group due to Buffy's burgeoning attraction to Angel, Xander's unrequited crush on Buffy, and Xander's own obliviousness to Willow's love for him. The Scoobies initially distrust Angel, but they warm to him as the season progresses. Giles comes to genuinely care for the other Scoobies and realizes that he must take an active presence in fighting demons and cannot simply rely on books and theoretical knowledge. The Scoobies often clash with popular student Cordelia Chase, who attempted to befriend Buffy on her first day, but Buffy objected to her treatment of Xander and Willow. Over the season, Cordelia becomes aware of the supernatural world around her and becomes a reluctant ally to the Scoobies, revealing a more intelligent side to her seemingly vapid personality.

Although the season contains several standalone episodes, there is a season-long story arc that focuses on the Master, an ancient vampire who recognizes Angel as having been a great evil prior to being cursed with a soul. The Master commands a cult of vampires known as the Order of Aurelius and is trapped in the Hellmouth by mystical forces.

The Master plans to kill the Slayer to regain his former power and open the Hellmouth. Buffy learns of a prophecy involving her death at his hands and finally confronts him. The Master bites Buffy and leaves her to drown. Buffy dies but is quickly revived by Xander. After a final standoff, Buffy kills the Master and accepts her responsibilities as the Slayer with help from her friends.

== Cast and characters ==
=== Main cast ===
- Sarah Michelle Gellar as Buffy Summers
- Nicholas Brendon as Xander Harris
- Alyson Hannigan as Willow Rosenberg
- Charisma Carpenter as Cordelia Chase
- Anthony Stewart Head as Rupert Giles

=== Recurring cast ===
- David Boreanaz as Angel
- Kristine Sutherland as Joyce Summers
- Mark Metcalf as The Master
- Andrew J. Ferchland as The Anointed One
- Ken Lerner as Principal Flutie
- Julie Benz as Darla
- Eric Balfour as Jesse McNally
- Robia LaMorte as Jenny Calendar
- Mercedes McNab as Harmony Kendall
- Armin Shimerman as Principal Snyder
- Brian Thompson as Luke
- William Monaghan as Dr. Stephen Gregory
- Elizabeth Anne Allen as Amy Madison

=== Guest cast ===
- Dean Butler as Hank Summers
- Robin Riker as Catherine Madison
- Musetta Vander as Natalie French/The She-Mantis
- Clea DuVall as Marcie Ross

== Production ==
Series creator Joss Whedon served as executive producer and showrunner and wrote three episodes: the two-part premiere and the finale, the latter of which he also directed. Whedon also received a "Story by" credit for the episodes "Nightmares" and "Out of Mind, Out of Sight". David Greenwalt joined the series as co-executive producer because 20th Century Fox wanted an experienced television producer, as Whedon had never run a television series before. Greenwalt wrote three episodes, one of which was based on a story by Whedon. Two pairs of story editors, Rob Des Hotel & Dean Batali and Matt Kiene & Joe Reinkemeyer, wrote three episodes between them. Staff writers Ashley Gable and Thomas A. Swyden wrote two episodes, one of which was based on a story by Whedon. Dana Reston wrote a single episode as a freelance script. The only director to direct more than one episode was Bruce Seth Green, who directed three episodes.

Whedon says that "Rhonda the Immortal Waitress was really the first incarnation of the Buffy concept, just the idea of some woman who seems to be completely insignificant who turns out to be extraordinary." This early, unproduced idea evolved into Buffy, which Whedon developed to invert the Hollywood formula of "the little blonde girl who goes into a dark alley and gets killed in every horror movie." Whedon wanted "to subvert that idea and create someone who was a hero." He explained, "The very first mission statement of the show was the joy of female power: having it, using it, sharing it."

The season was shot throughout 1996, with the idea first visiting through Whedon's script for the 1992 movie Buffy the Vampire Slayer, which featured Kristy Swanson in the title role. The director, Fran Rubel Kuzui, saw it as a "pop culture comedy about what people think about vampires." Whedon disagreed: "I had written this scary film about an empowered woman, and they turned it into a broad comedy. It was crushing." The script was praised within the industry, but the movie was not.

Several years later, Gail Berman, a Fox executive, approached Whedon to develop his Buffy concept into a television series. Whedon explained that "They said, 'Do you want to do a show?' And I thought, 'High school as a horror movie.' And so the metaphor became the central concept behind Buffy, and that's how I sold it." The supernatural elements in the series stood as metaphors for personal anxieties associated with adolescence and young adulthood. Whedon went on to write and partly fund a 25-minute non-broadcast pilot that was shown to networks and eventually sold to The WB Television Network. The latter promoted the premiere with a series of History of the Slayer clips, and the first episode aired on March 10, 1997. Whedon declared in June 2003 that the non-broadcast pilot would not be included with DVDs of the series, stating that it "sucks on ass."

== Episodes ==
| No. overall | No. in season | Title | Directed by | Written by | Original release date | Prod. code | U.S. viewers (millions) |
|---|---|---|---|---|---|---|---|
| 1 | 1 | "Welcome to the Hellmouth" | Charles Martin Smith | Joss Whedon | March 10, 1997 | 4V01 | 4.59 |
A vampire named Darla, a member of the Order of Aurelius and a servant of The Master, murders a student and stuffs him in a locker. Buffy arrives in Sunnydale hoping to have a fresh start, free of her Slayer responsibilities. Popular yet vapid cheerleader Cordelia attempts to befriend Buffy, but Buffy is repulsed by Cordelia's dismissive treatment of outcasts Xander, Willow, and Jesse. Buffy meets her new Watcher, Sunnydale High's librarian Giles, who warns Buffy that an increase in supernatural phenomena in Sunnydale in recent years is an indication of a forthcoming demon uprising. A mysterious figure named Angel, claiming to be a friend, offers guidance and warns about a "Harvest". That night, a group of vampires led by Darla attempt to kidnap Willow and Jesse. Buffy manages to kill one of the vampires and scares Darla off, rescuing Willow, but a stronger vampire named Luke corners her.
| 2 | 2 | "The Harvest" | John T. Kretchmer | Joss Whedon | March 10, 1997 | 4V02 | 4.59 |
After fending off Luke, Buffy regroups with Giles, Xander, and Willow. Following up on Angel's cryptic clue, Giles and Willow investigate the Harvest in books of demon mythology while Buffy and Xander venture into the sewers in search of Jesse. To their horror, they discover that Jesse has been sired into a vampire and only narrowly escape him. Giles and Willow have discovered that Sunnydale is built on a Hellmouth, a portal to demon dimensions, and that the Harvest is an event where a "vessel" of the Master drinks the blood of several victims to increase The Master's power. Realizing that the Harvest will take place that night at The Bronze, the gang prepares for battle. Buffy is forced to navigate her fractured relationship with her mother Joyce, who is oblivious to Buffy's Slayer role and believes her to be delinquent. At The Bronze, Buffy interrupts the Harvest and kills the vampires, infuriating The Master. The following day, Giles worries that Buffy and her friends are not prepared for the fight ahead of them.
| 3 | 3 | "Witch" | Stephen Cragg | Dana Reston | March 17, 1997 | 4V03 | 4.63 |
At tryouts for Sunnydale High's cheerleading squad, a girl spontaneously catches fire. Buffy, Willow, Xander, and Giles investigate. Another hopeful, Amy, stumbles during practice, knocking over Cordelia, and does not make the team. Soon after, Cordelia becomes disoriented and loses her sight. Buffy narrowly saves her from being run over. Buffy suspects that Amy may be a witch, causing these and other incidents in an attempt to make the cheerleading squad. Buffy spills a potion on Amy, and it turns blue, indicating recent use of magic. Amy realizes what is going on and casts a spell on Buffy, threatening to kill her if left unreversed. Arriving at Amy's home, Giles and Buffy confront her "mother". They quickly realize that Amy's mother, Catherine, is a witch and former cheerleader and has possessed her daughter's body. Giles reverses the spells, and Buffy and Catherine fight. Buffy uses a mirror to reflect a spell back onto Catherine, making her disappear. Amy is restored to her original body and she and Buffy become friends. Catherine is shown to be trapped inside a cheerleading trophy at school.
| 4 | 4 | "Teacher's Pet" | Bruce Seth Green | David Greenwalt | March 24, 1997 | 4V04 | 2.98 |
Shortly after encouraging Buffy, Sunnydale High's science teacher Dr. Gregory is attacked and goes missing. At a party, Angel appears and warns Buffy that somebody is coming. Miss French, a substitute teacher, has taken over Dr. Gregory's class, and the male students are immediately smitten. Buffy notices that Dr. Gregory's glasses have been left abandoned in his classroom. Later, Cordelia stumbles upon his headless corpse. Buffy investigates the death of a homeless man, suspecting it may be connected, and confronts a vampire she finds in the park. The vampire flees, encounters Miss French, and Buffy notices he is frightened by her. Buffy deduces that Miss French is a giant praying mantis. Buffy tries to warn Xander, but he goes to Miss French's house under the guise of helping her with a project. She drugs and imprisons Xander alongside Blayne, intending to use them to fertilize her eggs. Buffy and Giles track down the house and are able to kill She-Mantis in time to save Xander and Blayne. Under Dr. Gregory's desk, several mantis eggs begin to hatch.
| 5 | 5 | "Never Kill a Boy on the First Date" | David Semel | Rob Des Hotel & Dean Batali | March 31, 1997 | 4V05 | 4.09 |
After slaying a vampire, Buffy and Giles find a ring that they link with a prophecy of the Anointed One, who can free the Master from his prison. Buffy arranges a date with a student named Owen, but Giles believes that the prophecy will be fulfilled that evening. The two wait at the cemetery but see nothing. That evening, a bus crashes and five people die after vampires attack it. Giles connects the crash to the prophecy, but Buffy decides to leave with Owen. Giles visits the funeral home and is cornered by vampires. Angel warns Buffy about the prophecy, but she dismisses him until Willow and Xander show up. Owen follows the three to the funeral home, and Buffy leaves him with Xander and Willow. However, they run into a victim of the bus crash, now a vampire. Buffy, Giles, and Owen subdue the vampire before Buffy throws him into a furnace. The next day, Owen asks for another date, but Buffy refuses, fearing for his safety should they stay together. Giles and Buffy take comfort in believing that they stopped the prophecy, but the real Anointed One, a young boy named Collin, meets the Master in his underground lair.
| 6 | 6 | "The Pack" | Bruce Seth Green | Matt Kiene & Joe Reinkemeyer | April 7, 1997 | 4V06 | 3.42 |
On a school field trip at the zoo, four students sneak into a closed hyena exhibit. When Xander goes after them, all five are possessed by the hyenas' spirits. They form a pack and roam around town, acting increasingly strange. Xander refuses to study with Willow before insulting her. A piglet mascot for the school acts panicked around Xander, and he and the others later eat it. Buffy suspects that something has horribly affected Xander, but Giles blames his behavior on teenage hormones. After Xander tries to force himself on Buffy, she locks him in the library book cage. The rest of the pack attack and eat the principal. Buffy and Giles return to the zoo, while Willow guards Xander. Buffy and Giles meet the zookeeper, and together they form a plan to reverse the possession. The remaining pack finds Xander and breaks him out. Buffy lures the pack back to the zoo, while Giles discovers that the zookeeper had intended to absorb the spirits himself. When the group arrives, the zookeeper takes control of the hyenas' spirits, but Buffy throws him into the hyena enclosure. The hyenas eat the zookeeper, reversing Xander and the other student's possession.
| 7 | 7 | "Angel" | Scott Brazil | David Greenwalt | April 14, 1997 | 4V07 | 3.39 |
The Master sends three warrior vampires after Buffy. With Angel's help, she escapes, but he is injured during the fight. They retreat to Buffy's house, and Angel explains that he fights vampires because his family was killed by them. Angel spends the night in Buffy's room, sleeping on the floor beside her bed. The Master has Darla kill the three warriors in front of the Anointed One. The next day, Buffy returns to her room, where she has hidden Angel. After he confesses his attraction to her, they kiss. Angel pulls back, revealing his true vampire face, and flees when Buffy screams. Giles learns that Angel used to be called Angelus, a vampire who massacred his way through Europe before moving to America and becoming a recluse. Darla bites Joyce, Buffy's mother, and attempts to frame Angel for it. Angel resists the temptation to bite her, but Buffy arrives while he is still holding Joyce's unconscious body. Buffy throws Angel through a window and takes Joyce to the hospital. Later, she tracks him to The Bronze, where the two briefly fight. Angel reveals that he killed his family, along with a Romani girl, whose family cursed him by restoring his soul. Darla shoots at Angel and Buffy before Angel stakes Darla. Later, Angel and Buffy meet and admit they can't be together. The two share a kiss before saying goodbye.
| 8 | 8 | "I, Robot... You, Jane" | Stephen Posey | Ashley Gable & Thomas A. Swyden | April 28, 1997 | 4V08 | 2.47 |
In Cortona, Italy 1418, priests trap the demon Moloch inside a book. In the present day, Willow scans that book into the computer, and the text in the book disappears. The following week, Willow tells Buffy that she has developed an online relationship with a boy named "Malcolm". Moloch, who has passed into the computer, instructs a student named Fritz to watch Buffy. Wanting to learn more about "Malcolm", Buffy talks to another student, Dave. He warns Buffy to leave Willow alone. Willow asks to meet "Malcolm", but when he mentions information about Buffy's past, she becomes suspicious and ends the chat. Dave tells Buffy that Willow wants to meet her in the locker room, but suddenly warns her just before she is electrocuted in a trap set by Fritz. Fritz fakes Dave's suicide on Moloch's orders. Giles asks Jenny Calendar, Sunnydale's computing teacher, to work with him to stop Moloch. He is surprised to learn that Jenny is already familiar with demons. Fritz kidnaps Willow, taking her to a facility where Moloch, who pretended to be Malcolm, has taken control of a robotic body. Giles and Jenny cast a spell to purge Moloch from the internet, while Buffy destroys his robot body. The next day, Buffy, Willow, and Xander agree their love lives are doomed thanks to the Hellmouth.
| 9 | 9 | "The Puppet Show" | Ellen S. Pressman | Rob Des Hotel & Dean Batali | May 5, 1997 | 4V09 | 2.56 |
Shortly after a rehearsal for Sunnydale High's talent show, a girl is killed and her heart removed. Giles, Buffy, Willow, and Xander investigate and are led to Morgan, a ventriloquist with a dummy named Sid. After she catches Sid in her bedroom one night, Buffy suspects the dummy is somehow alive. In class, the teacher confiscates Sid, and Xander steals him so Buffy can talk with Morgan alone. When Sid remains inanimate, Xander mocks Buffy's suspicions. While Giles, Xander, and Willow are researching in the library, Sid suddenly disappears. Backstage, Buffy finds Morgan dead and missing his brain. A chandelier falls on Buffy, and Sid attacks her with a knife. Buffy overpowers him, and Sid reveals that he also hunts demons and thought that Buffy was one. Sid explains that he was cursed to become a dummy and needs to kill the real demons to lift the curse, although to do so will cause his death. Buffy finds Morgan's brain, and after learning that he was suffering from brain cancer, realizes that the demon still needs a viable human. The demon ties Giles to a guillotine backstage, and Buffy, Xander, and Willow rescue him. Sid ends his curse after he cuts out the demon's heart and dies.
| 10 | 10 | "Nightmares" | Bruce Seth Green | Story by : Joss Whedon; Teleplay by : David Greenwalt | May 12, 1997 | 4V10 | 3.47 |
A student, Wendell, opens his book during class to reveal several spiders. Suddenly, Buffy sees a little boy outside the classroom. Wendell tells Willow and Xander that he regularly has nightmares about spiders. Several other students also experience their nightmares coming true. Another student, Laura, is attacked by a demon, and Buffy and Giles visit her in the hospital. Buffy is surprised to see the little boy from earlier, Billy, in a coma with similar injuries. Buffy's dad, Hank, visits her at school and blames Buffy for causing her parents' divorce, saying he never wants to see her again. Buffy talks to Billy and is attacked by the same demon that attacked Laura. Attempting to escape, the pair end up in a cemetery and encounter The Master, who throws Buffy into a coffin and buries her. Buffy escapes the grave but has become a vampire. Giles suggests that waking Billy will end the nightmares. At the hospital, Buffy attacks and defeats the demon, proving to Billy that it is no threat. Billy wakes, returning everything to normal. His baseball coach arrives, and they discover he is the one who attacked Billy. Later, Hank picks Buffy up from school and is happy to see her, revealing that their previous conversation was a nightmare.
| 11 | 11 | "Out of Mind, Out of Sight" | Reza Badiyi | Story by : Joss Whedon; Teleplay by : Ashley Gable & Thomas A. Swyden | May 19, 1997 | 4V11 | 3.36 |
In the locker room, a student hears laughing but sees nothing before being beaten with a floating baseball bat. Later, Harmony is pushed down the stairs by an invisible force and injures her leg. Buffy deduces that Marcie, a missing student, is behind the incidents. Angel tells Giles that he can find an ancient book vital to Giles's research about The Master. Giles suggests that Marcie has become invisible as a result of being ignored by everyone at school. Cordelia asks Buffy for help and confesses that, despite being popular, she often feels alone. Marcie locks Xander, Willow, and Giles in the boiler room and opens a valve, filling the room with gas. Angel rescues them and gives Giles the book. Marcie kidnaps Cordelia and Buffy and ties them up at the Bronze. Marcie plans to disfigure Cordelia's face, slashing it once before Buffy breaks loose. Initially hampered by being unable to see Marcie, Buffy uses her Slayer senses to focus and defeat her. FBI agents arrive and take Marcie to a school with other invisible students to learn about assassination.
| 12 | 12 | "Prophecy Girl" | Joss Whedon | Joss Whedon | June 2, 1997 | 4V12 | 3.97 |
Reading the book that Angel gave him, Giles discovers a prophecy that the Slayer shall die in battle against The Master. An earthquake shakes Sunnydale, indicating that the prophecy is imminent. Xander asks Buffy to the upcoming prom, but she declines, not wanting to ruin their friendship. Buffy overhears Angel and Giles discussing the prophecy and her impending death. Devastated, she quits slaying in an attempt to avoid her fate. Willow and Cordelia come across a room full of students killed by vampires. Giles decides to face the Master in Buffy's place and tries to stop her, but she knocks him out and leaves. Buffy meets with the Anointed One, who leads her to The Master. Xander persuades Angel to join the fight. The Master easily overpowers Buffy, biting her and leaving her for dead. Using her blood, he breaks free of the magical barrier holding him captive. Jenny and Willow are surrounded by vampires but are rescued by Cordelia. Angel and Xander find Buffy dead, but Xander is able to resuscitate her. Displaying newfound strength, Buffy confronts The Master. After a brief fight, Buffy overpowers him, throwing him through a skylight. He is impaled on a shard of wood and dies, closing the Hellmouth.

== Reception ==
On the review aggregator website Metacritic, the first season scored 80 out of 100 based on 15 reviews, indicating "generally favorable reviews". Rotten Tomatoes gave season one a score of 97% with an average rating of 7.70 out of 10 based on 37 reviews, with a critics' consensus stating, "Buffy slays her way into the pop-culture lexicon in a debut season that lays the groundwork for one of TV's greatest supernatural teen dramas."

The pilot episode, "Welcome to the Hellmouth", was nominated for a Primetime Emmy Award for Outstanding Makeup for a Series.

In retrospect, Joss Whedon said: "In season one, we found that we had a show that people liked. I really thought people were going to laugh at the Buffy/Angel thing and say, 'Well, he's a vampire. This is so hokey.' But they couldn’t get enough of it. It definitely made me realize the soap opera aspect of it; a continuing story of the romance and the people and their emotions was really what was fascinating. The monsters were all very well and good, but in the first season we were like, 'Let’s take our favorite horror movies and turn them into high school stories.'"

== Home media ==
Buffy the Vampire Slayer: The Complete First Season was released on DVD in region 1 on January 15, 2002 and in region 2 on November 27, 2000. The DVD includes all 12 episodes on three discs presented in full frame 1.33:1 aspect ratio. Special features on the DVD include a commentary track by creator Joss Whedon on "Welcome to Hellmouth" and "The Harvest", along with the original script for the episode. Other features include interviews with Joss Whedon and cast member David Boreanaz, with Whedon discussing the episodes "Witch", "Never Kill a Boy on the First Date", "Angel", and "The Puppet Show". Also included are cast/crew biographies, DVD-ROM content, photo galleries, and series trailers.
