= Prophecy Girl =

- Buffy the Vampire Slayer episode
- Episode no.: Season 1 Episode 12
- Directed by: Joss Whedon
- Written by: Joss Whedon
- Production code: 4V12
- Original air date: June 2, 1997

Guest appearances
- David Boreanaz as Angel; Mark Metcalf as The Master; Kristine Sutherland as Joyce Summers; Robia LaMorte as Jenny Calendar; Andrew J. Ferchland as the Anointed One; Scott Gurney as Kevin

Episode chronology
← Previous "Out of Mind, Out of Sight"	Next → "When She Was Bad"
- Buffy the Vampire Slayer season 1

"Prophecy Girl" is the season finale of the first season of the drama television series Buffy the Vampire Slayer. It first aired on The WB on June 2, 1997. Series creator Joss Whedon wrote and directed the episode.

Buffy wants to resign from her life of slaying when Giles uncovers an ancient prophesy that spells out her deadly fate, as the Master's ascension from the Hellmouth is at hand. As the earth begins to crack open, Xander, Willow and Cordelia face an army of demons and the prophetic end of the world. Meanwhile, Xander finally asks Buffy to the prom with equally disastrous consequences.

== Plot ==
Xander (Nicholas Brendon) is practicing lines on Willow (Alyson Hannigan) at the Bronze, practicing how to ask Buffy (Sarah Michelle Gellar) to the prom. Cordelia (Charisma Carpenter) is in her car with Kevin (Scott Gurney) as Buffy slays a vampire nearby. In the library, Giles (Anthony Stewart Head) is reading the Pergamum Codex and comes across a passage concerning Buffy that shocks him. Suddenly, an earthquake is felt around Sunnydale.

The next morning, Buffy meets Giles in the library and notices the damage caused by the earthquake. She explains that vampires are increasing in number and growing bolder, but Giles appears distracted. After class, Xander asks Buffy to the dance. She gently tells him she does not share his feelings and only sees him as a friend. Disappointed, Xander jokes that he must be undead to get her attention before walking away.

Giles phones Angel (David Boreanaz) to arrange a meeting as Jenny (Robin LaMorte) arrives at the library, having noticed signs of the apocalypse and demanding answers. She tells him that Brother Luca, a monk in Cortona, has been emailing her about the Anointed One. Giles asks her to gather more information, promising to explain everything later.

Kevin and Willow agree to help Cordelia set up the sound system for the dance. Willow notices Xander sulking alone and comforts him. When Xander asks her to the dance, she refuses to be his second choice.

That evening, Buffy sees blood running from the faucet in the girls' locker room. She goes to the library and overhears Giles telling Angel that she will face the Master (Mark Metcalf) and die the following night. Devastated, Buffy rejects their attempts to comfort her and reveals that she plans to avoid the prophecy by quitting as the Slayer. In tears, Buffy tells Giles she is only sixteen and doesn't want to die. She rips off her cross necklace and walks out.

Buffy tries to convince her mother (Kristine Sutherland) to go away with her for the weekend. Joyce reminds her that she has to work and surprises her with a new evening gown. After sharing how she met Buffy's father, Joyce encourages her to go to the dance.

The next day at school, Cordelia and Willow discover Kevin and several students killed by vampires, their bodies left in front of a television playing cartoons. Dressed in her prom gown, Buffy visits Willow at home to comfort her. Willow describes the attack as deeply personal and disturbing. When Willow asks what they'll do next, Buffy replies, "What we have to," and tells her to stay in for the night.

In the library, Giles reveals to Jenny that Buffy is the Slayer. When Jenny mentions a Bible verse from Brother Luca, Giles realizes the Anointed One is still alive and is a child. Determined to protect Buffy, he decides to face the Master himself. However, Buffy arrives — having accepted her fate — and knocks him out when he refuses to let her go. Jenny warns her of the prophecy, but Buffy insists she might take the Master down with her. Buffy encounters the Anointed One and willingly follows him to the Master's lair. After discovering her plan, Xander confronts Angel and forces him to help find the Master, despite their mutual dislike and shared feelings for Buffy. Meanwhile, Giles sends Jenny and Willow to warn students at the dance, but they see an army of vampires approaching.

Underground, the Master overpowers Buffy using hypnosis and reveals that her blood is the key to his release. After drinking from her, he leaves her unconscious in a shallow pool and escapes his mystical prison. Xander and Angel arrive too late and find Buffy dead. When Angel says he has no breath, Xander performs CPR on Buffy and revives her. Meanwhile, Cordelia rescues Willow and Jenny by crashing her car into the school. As the vampires attack, the group barricades themselves in the library, where a tentacled demon erupts from the floor, revealing the Hellmouth.

Buffy confronts the Master on the roof above the library. Resisting his hypnosis, she throws him through a skylight, impaling him on a wooden shard. His body disintegrates, and the Hellmouth closes. Back in the library, Giles remarks he should have known Buffy wouldn't let death stop her. The group decides to attend the prom, with Buffy declaring, "We saved the world. I say we party." As they leave for the Bronze, the Master's skeleton remains behind.

== Production ==
Due to the first season of the show acting as a midseason replacement for Savannah, all twelve episodes were produced before the first episode aired (and as such, the conclusion of the episode serves to wrap the series up in case it were not renewed). All following seasons ran from September to May and received twenty-two episode pick-ups.

The exchange between Buffy and Angel, where he starts to tell her that he likes her dress but she cuts him off, saying, "Yeah, yeah. It was a big hit with everyone." was added in production and not in the original script.

The budget for Buffy didn't allow for a computer-generated effect, so tentacle "costumes" were created for the huge demon that comes up out of the Hellmouth at the end of the episode. Each tentacle has a human being inside manipulating it from within.

== Cultural references ==
When Cordelia and Willow find the students dead, the television is showing an episode of Looney Tunes cartoons.

Xander mentions Locutus of Borg from Star Trek: The Next Generation.

== Broadcast and reception ==
"Prophecy Girl" was first broadcast on The WB on June 2, 1997. It received a Nielsen rating of 2.8 on its initial airing.

Vox ranked this episode at #25 out of the 144 Buffy episodes, in honor of the 20th anniversary of the show, saying, "When Buffy’s voice cracks as she says, 'Giles, I’m 16 years old. I don’t want to die,' the show moves out of its goofy camp mode and into tragic horror, in the kind of tonal transition it would perfect over the next season."

Noel Murray of The A.V. Club gave "Prophecy Girl" a grade of A−, describing it as "a sterling example of how to write and direct this show". He particularly praised the quieter moments between the characters, and listed "the story feeling a little compressed" as his main qualm. Emily VanDerWerff, also of The A.V. Club listed "Prophecy Girl" as one of the "10 episodes that show how Buffy The Vampire Slayer blew up genre TV", writing that it gave "a sense of the series at its early best."

DVD Talk's Phillip Duncan described the episode as "a neat and tidy close without much fanfare" and felt that there was "too much crammed into this episode as several plot-points are struggled to be resolved". On the other hand, a review from the BBC called it "a very satisfying conclusion", highlighting the tone and the performances. Joss Whedon named "Prophecy Girl" as his tenth favorite episode.

Screen Rant named it an episode including some of "The Best 60 Seconds From All 7 Seasons," beginning when "she faces the Master again, without fear, resulting in season 1's best minute. The Master attempts to hypnotize Buffy again, but she resists, grabs him by the neck, and launches him through a skylight."

Rolling Stone ranked "Prophecy Girl" at #32 on their "Every Episode Ranked From Worst to Best" list, quoting Buffy's plea to Giles, "I’m 16 years old, I don’t want to die,” and goes on to praise the finale, saying season one had been "mostly silly up to this point, but 'Prophecy Girl' elevated the show closer to what it would eventually become, a show about loss and pain and heroism."

"Prophecy Girl" was ranked at #14 on Paste Magazine's "Every Episode Ranked" list and #13 on BuzzFeed's "Ranking Every Episode" list.
