= Angel (Buffy the Vampire Slayer episode) =

- Buffy the Vampire Slayer episode
- Episode no.: Season 1 Episode 7
- Directed by: Scott Brazil
- Written by: David Greenwalt
- Production code: 4V07
- Original air date: April 14, 1997

Guest appearances
- Mark Metcalf as Master; David Boreanaz as Angel; Kristine Sutherland as Joyce Summers; Julie Benz as Darla; Andrew J. Ferchland as Anointed One

Episode chronology
← Previous "The Pack"	Next → "I, Robot... You, Jane"
- Buffy the Vampire Slayer season 1

"Angel" is the seventh episode of season 1 of the television series Buffy the Vampire Slayer. The episode aired on The WB on April 14, 1997. It was written by co-executive producer David Greenwalt and directed by Scott Brazil.

== Plot ==
The Master sends a trio of armored warrior vampires after Buffy. They ambush her, but Angel arrives to help her. Angel is injured during the fight and Buffy invites him back to her house. With the vampire trio on the other side of the door, Angel explains that a vampire cannot enter someone's home unless invited in. Buffy recalls hearing that but tells Angel she has never had to put it to the test before. When Buffy's mother, Joyce, suddenly returns home from work, Buffy covers for Angel, claiming that he is a college student tutoring her in history. When Angel takes his shirt off, Buffy notices a tattoo and asks him if he was stalking her, because she felt his presence at the Bronze. He shrugs it off. Buffy asks Angel why he fights vampires and he reveals that his family was killed by vampires.

The next morning, Giles informs the group that the vampire trio were known as The Three, warrior vampires controlled by the Master. The Master allows Darla to kill The Three, as a lesson in the use of power for Collin, the Anointed One.

The next day, Buffy returns to Angel. She notices her diary askew and tries to explain away entries that reveal fantasies about "A". Angel assures her that he did not read the diary. He then confesses his attraction towards her, but says he cannot be around her as he is older than her. They kiss. Suddenly, Angel pulls back with a snarl of distress, showing his vampire face. Buffy screams in shock and he dives out the window.

Giles researches Angel's history and notices the peculiarity that, although he was previously infamous as the sadistic killer known as Angelus, Angel has shunned the company of other vampires since coming to America and apparently has completely stopped preying on humans.

Darla cons Joyce into inviting her in and bites her. Angel hears Joyce's cry and rushes in. Darla shoves the now-unconscious Joyce into Angel's arms and escapes out the back door. Angel resists the impulse to drink, but Buffy sees him and is horrified. At the hospital, Joyce's last memory is of inviting Buffy's "study friend" inside. Buffy misunderstands, thinking Joyce means Angel rather than Darla, and storms out to kill him.

Giles talks further with Joyce and learns that it was Darla, not Angel, who bit Joyce. With Xander and Willow in tow, he rushes to find Buffy to warn her of the trap. Buffy tracks Angel to the deserted Bronze and demands an explanation; Angel tells how he was cursed by Gypsies who restored his human soul so that he would be eternally tormented with the guilt of his past sins. He denies biting Joyce, yet confesses wanting to, as well as wanting to kill Buffy. The Slayer lays aside her crossbow and slowly offers her throat to him. Suddenly, Darla emerges from the shadows with a pair of pistols. Hearing gunfire, Giles, Willow and Xander rush in and distract Darla. Looming up from behind, Angel stakes Darla through the heart.

In their Hellmouth lair, Collin consoles the Master for his loss of Darla at Angel's hands. Spying Angel across the crowded room at the Bronze, Buffy goes to thank him and they agree not to get involved as it could be dangerous for the both of them. As they deeply kiss one last time, Buffy does not notice that the cross she is wearing — the one Angel gave her weeks ago at their first meeting — is scorching his chest.

== Production ==
During the production of this episode, it took the makeup department 60 to 90 minutes to apply the vampire prosthetic on David Boreanaz.

Angel's Hugo Boss duster he wears is worth over $1,000.

== Cultural references ==
Xander's line "fish gotta swim, birds gotta fly" is a line from the song "Can't Help Lovin' Dat Man" from the 1929 musical Show Boat.

The Master says that "with great power comes great responsibility," quoting from the origin story of Spider-Man.

Cordelia wears a dress from the designer Todd Oldham.

== Broadcast and reception ==
"Angel" was first broadcast on The WB on April 14, 1997. It earned a Nielsen rating of 2.3 on its original airing.

Vox ranked it at #39 on their "Every Episode Ranked From Worst to Best" list of all 144 episodes (to mark the 20th anniversary of the show), saying, "No one would ever accuse young David Boreanaz of being a great actor... but he and Sarah Michelle Gellar have chemistry compelling enough to keep the audience feeling every bit of their pain."

Noel Murray of The A.V. Club gave "Angel" a grade of A, calling it the best episode thus far. He praised how Buffy inviting Angel into her home was used as a metaphor, how that "ambiguity" was used to tease the audience, and the "multitude of character touches, funny bits of dialogue, and milieu-enriching moments". DVD Talk's Phillip Duncan called the episode "excellent", highlighting the "well-crafted" dialogue-heavy part and the "poignant ending". A review from the BBC praised the way the episode was constructed and noted the importance of it character-wise, but called it "rather mundane."

Rolling Stone ranked "Angel" at #52 on their "Every Episode Ranked From Worst to Best" list, writing that after Buffy finds out Angel is a vampire, "we basically get the wider arc of Season Two writ miniature in this excellent episode. There’s the love and romance, the emergence of the dark side, their confrontation and opposition, and finally, reconciliation. Season Two would expand it to much greater effect, but this little amuse-bouche of an episode whets the appetite for what is to come."

"Angel" was ranked at #41 on Paste Magazine's "Every Episode Ranked" list and #50 on BuzzFeed's "Ranking Every Episode" list.
