= Nightmares (Buffy the Vampire Slayer) =

- Buffy the Vampire Slayer episode
- Episode no.: Season 1 Episode 10
- Directed by: Bruce Seth Green
- Story by: Joss Whedon
- Teleplay by: David Greenwalt
- Production code: 4V10
- Original air date: May 12, 1997

Guest appearances
- Mark Metcalf as The Master; Kristine Sutherland as Joyce Summers; Dean Butler as Hank Summers; Andrew J. Ferchland as The Anointed One; Jeremy Foley as Billy Palmer; Brian Pietro as the Coach; Justin Urich as Wendell; J. Robin Miller as Laura

Episode chronology
| ← Previous "The Puppet Show" | Next → "Out of Mind, Out of Sight" |
- Buffy the Vampire Slayer season 1

"Nightmares" is the tenth episode of the first season of the television series Buffy the Vampire Slayer. The episode's teleplay was written by David Greenwalt, with a story by Joss Whedon, and directed by Bruce Seth Green.

The world of nightmares and reality become one when everyone in Sunnydale is living out their worst fears. While Xander comes to school in his underwear and Giles is unable to read, Buffy must unravel the mystery before reality folds completely into the world of nightmares.

== Plot ==
Buffy has a nightmare about being choked by the Master in his underground lair. Buffy's mother, Joyce, shakes her awake, and as Buffy wakes up, she remembers that she is excited to be spending the coming weekend with her father. Buffy confides to Willow that she thinks she might have something to do with her parents' divorce. In a class, when the teacher asks Wendell to read from the text book, tarantulas crawl out of it. Buffy sees a boy standing in the doorway, saying that he is sorry.

The next day, as the Master explains to Collin, the Anointed One, how wonderful he finds fear, Buffy is nervous about being picked up by her father after school, and her mother calms her down. At school, Willow and Xander are worried about the spiders, and want to talk to Giles about it. Giles mutters that he "got lost," seemingly in the stacks of books. Giles has no information on the spiders so the gang goes to talk to Wendell, who explains he has been having recurring spider nightmares.

In the meantime, Cordelia lets Buffy know about a history test that Buffy has not studied for. Buffy has a hard time even finding the class, and the test is over in what feels like a moment; Buffy has not even filled in her name. She once again sees the same boy outside the classroom. As break-time begins, a girl named Laura takes a smoking break in the basement. An ugly man comes out of the shadows and says, "lucky nineteen" before assaulting Laura.

Later, Buffy and Giles interview Laura in the hospital, where they hear about "lucky nineteen." They also find the young boy from before (Billy), in a coma due to a similar attack. More nightmarish instances start to occur, starting with Xander finding that all of his clothing has vanished and he is naked in his classroom, wearing nothing but his boxers. Giles now cannot read but he finds a picture of Billy. Cordelia's hair becomes a disheveled, spiky mess, her designer clothes become horribly drab and nerdy, and she is physically forced to join the school chess club. Buffy realizes that she had been seeing Billy at school while he was still in a coma at the hospital. Giles theorizes she might have been seeing Billy's astral projection.

Buffy's father shows up and calmly tells her that she is at fault for her parents' divorce, because she is such a difficult child and he can't stand being around her. Then he scolds her for crying at his hurtful accusations and tells her he never wants to see her again. The Scooby Gang quickly figures out that their nightmares are becoming reality, including Xander's nightmare of being chased by a clown and Willow's nightmare of appearing on stage, expected to perform Madama Butterfly. Buffy finds Billy's astral body, and then they are both found by the man who assaulted Laura. Nightmares plague everyone and Buffy learns Billy has experienced some sort of punishment for poor baseball skills. They evade the scary man and find themselves in a graveyard where The Master confronts Buffy, and buries her alive.

Meanwhile, Willow, Xander and Giles find Buffy's grave. Giles explains that it is his worst nightmare to let Buffy die on his watch. Buffy then crawls out of the grave as a vampire, revealing her worst nightmare is dying and becoming a vampire herself. The gang decides that they must wake up Billy from his coma to stop the nightmares. In the hospital, they find Billy's astral body near Billy's comatose body. As the ugly man finds him, Buffy confronts him. After knocking him out, she encourages Billy to face him. Billy wakes up and everything is back to normal.

Billy's Kiddie League coach shows up, and refers to him as his "lucky nineteen". Buffy realizes he must be the "ugly man" who put Billy into a coma after they lost the game. He tries to run after Buffy confronts him, but is stopped by Giles and Xander and arrested. The episode ends when Buffy and her father leave for their weekend together, the previous confrontation just an unreal nightmare.

== Production ==
Sarah Michelle Gellar has a similar phobia as her character, which made filming this episode specially difficult for her. She described: "I have an irrational fear of cemeteries and being buried alive. I told the producer, 'Look, I can't do it, I'm sorry.' Through miscommunication, the message never got relayed, and it was four in the morning, and they basically made me do it, and I was hysterical. It was one of the hardest things I've ever done for my job, ever. Some people find cemeteries a turn-on. Some people like sex in cemeteries. Not me. I cried the whole way home. It was horrible. It's really hard to be a vampire slayer if you're scared of cemeteries."

== Continuity ==
When Xander asks, "Our dreams are coming true?" Giles replies, "Dreams? That would be a musical comedy version of this." In "Once More, With Feeling," Willow sings, "I've got a theory; some kid is dreaming and we're all stuck inside his wacky Broadway nightmare."

== Cultural references ==
Willow says Cordelia is "Evita-like," a reference to Eva Peron, whose life the musical and film Evita is based on.

Nerf Herder can be seen written inside Willow's locker. They are the band that composed the theme song for Buffy the Vampire Slayer.

One of the chocolate bars Xander finds is of the brand Hershey's.

Before burying Buffy alive, the Master quotes the song "A Dream Is a Wish Your Heart Makes".

== Broadcast and reception ==
"Nightmares" was first broadcast on The WB on May 12, 1997. It received a Nielsen rating of 2.5 on its initial airing.

Vox ranked it at #112 on their "Every Episode Ranked From Worst to Best" list (to mark the 20th anniversary of the show), writing that it "takes a classic nightmares-come-true premise and lurches around wildly in its execution. Some of it is fine but uninspired... but at its best, 'Nightmares' locks in on the specific yet universal adolescent fears that makes Buffy such a classic. In particular, there's Buffy's nightmare vision of her rarely seen father, who kindly and reasonably tells her she’s the reason for her parents' divorce — because 'You're sullen and rude, and you're not nearly as bright as I thought you were going to be.' Buffy's quiet devastation in response is a stunner."

Billie Doux gave it 3 out of 4 stakes and called it "a terrific story idea... executed beautifully." The Snark Squad wrote, "It was a good balance of camp, humor and even a little creepiness."

Noel Murray of The A.V. Club gave "Nightmares" a grade of B+. He praised the concept but felt that it was a "mild disappointment" due to underwhelming performances by the cast. DVD Talk's Phillip Duncan wrote that "Nightmares" was "easily the most confusing" episode of the season because of the dreams, and concluded that "it seemed like too many things and ideas were crammed into the episode simply because they could be explained away as dreams". A review from the BBC praised Buffy's scenes with her father, as well as some of the more comedic nightmares.

Rolling Stone ranked "Nightmares" at #60 on their "Every Episode Ranked From Worst to Best" list, calling it "whacky and full of the campy horror Buffy was always capable of delivering" and describing Buffy’s nightmares as "feelings of inadequacy, feelings of being the reason for her parents' separation," adding that it was "devastating to watch."

"Nightmares" was ranked at #56 on Paste Magazine's "Every Episode Ranked" list and #41 on BuzzFeed's "Ranking Every Episode" list.
