= When She Was Bad =

- Buffy the Vampire Slayer episode
- Episode no.: Season 2 Episode 1
- Directed by: Joss Whedon
- Written by: Joss Whedon
- Production code: 5V01
- Original air date: September 15, 1997

Guest appearances
- Kristine Sutherland as Joyce Summers; Robia LaMorte as Jenny Calendar; Mark Metcalf as The Master; Andrew J. Ferchland as The Anointed One; Dean Butler as Hank Summers; Brent Jennings as Absalom; Armin Shimerman as Principal Snyder; Cibo Matto as themselves

Episode chronology
← Previous "Prophecy Girl"	Next → "Some Assembly Required"
- Buffy the Vampire Slayer season 2

"When She Was Bad" is the season premiere of the second season of Buffy the Vampire Slayer and the thirteenth episode in the series. The episode aired on The WB on September 15, 1997. The episode was written and directed by series creator and executive producer Joss Whedon.

When Buffy returns home to Sunnydale after a spending the summer away, Xander and Willow become concerned with her disturbingly cold and distant behavior. Meanwhile, Cordelia and Sunnydale High teacher Ms. Calendar are kidnapped and Buffy is convinced that the fight to protect them and the world from the undead is hers alone. Still reluctant to risk getting close to Angel, Buffy turns him away before either one can express their true feelings.

== Plot ==
At school, Giles explains to Buffy, Xander and Willow that although they have closed the Hellmouth, the mystical energy still attracts evil forces to the town. Buffy's parents discuss her trip to L.A., where her father comments that she was distant and withdrawn. Buffy begins behaving coldly and contemptuously towards her friends, startling them. Cordelia runs into the gang, remembering her previous encounters with the supernatural, and promises not to tell anyone Buffy is the slayer. Whilst training after school, Buffy has a vision of the Master and begins furiously hitting a dummy. At night, she dreams of being killed by him; when she wakes, Angel appears in her room to warn her of the childlike Anointed One. Buffy coldly brushes him off. He tells her he missed her and leaves before she can reply. At the Bronze, Xander and Willow worry about Buffy's behavior. Buffy then arrives in a very revealing dress and mocks Angel. She begins a slow, sensual dance with Xander in order to make Angel jealous, and cruelly mocks Xander for his unrequited attraction to her.

Meanwhile, the Anointed One and his acolyte Absalom are forcing their vampires to dig up the Master's bones barehanded through consecrated earth.

Cordelia confronts Buffy and tells her to get over her problems. Buffy leaves and Cordelia is kidnapped by two dark figures. They throw her into a basement with an unconscious Jenny Calendar. Buffy walks to the grave that holds the bones of the Master, and finds it dug up.

At lunch the next day, Giles shares Xander and Willow's concerns about Buffy, who then shows up to tell them about her discovery. Giles remembers the existence of some revivification spells and Buffy is angered that he never told her about them. That night, the Scoobies learn that a revivification spell needs the blood of the "closest" person to the deceased. Buffy thinks she is the target, as she and Master were close. Cordelia's necklace, wrapped around a large rock, is thrown through the library window. Ignoring her friends' protests, Buffy leaves for the obvious trap, saying in frustration that she cannot look out for them while slaying.

Inside the basement where she has been led, Buffy and Angel find one female vampire. Buffy realizes that the trap is not for her. At the same time, Giles realizes that the Latin text actually said that the ritual requires the blood of those physically nearest to the Master when he died – Giles, Willow, Cordelia and Jenny. Giles and Willow are kidnapped by several vampires. Buffy returns to the library, where she finds a bloodied Xander, who is upset with her for abandoning her friends and threatens to kill her if anything happens to Willow. Buffy tortures a vampire for information on their whereabouts. Buffy interrupts the ritual and slays several vampires while Angel and Xander rescue the others. In a rage, Buffy smashes the Master's bones to bits with a sledgehammer to prevent his resurrection, before tearfully collapsing into Angel's arms as he comforts her.

The next day, Buffy apologizes for her behavior and is pleasantly surprised to find herself forgiven. Meanwhile, the Anointed One gazes at the scene of destruction, and vows revenge on Buffy.

== Reception ==
"When She Was Bad" drew an audience of 2.9 million households. When the episode was aired as a repeat in November 1997, it scored a higher 3.1 million household rating.

Vox ranked it at #111 on their "Every Episode Ranked From Worst to Best" list (to mark the 20th anniversary of the show), suggesting it contains a metaphor "about how teen girls sometimes act like total nightmares because of the pervasive, unarticulated trauma" of being a teen girl. They add that the really memorable moment will be Buffy's seductive dance with Xander, which will show up in the opening credits henceforth.

Noel Murray of The A.V. Club gave "When She Was Bad" a mixed review. While he praised the opening and closing scenes as well as other smaller moments, he felt that it dealt with the characters' emotions "erratically" and was not positive towards Buffy's attitude and carrying over the Master plotline. A review from the BBC called "When She Was Bad" "another excellent episode", praising its tying up plot threads from the first season and developing the relationships between characters.

Rolling Stone ranked "When She Was Bad" at #103 on their "Every Episode Ranked From Worst to Best" list, calling it a "strange episode, feeling almost uncharacteristic at times," adding that Buffy dealing with her traumatic encounter with the Master left her "scarred and traumatized. And while the episode is driving home how difficult it can be to overcome trauma, Buffy is kind of a dick here." They criticize Buffy's "weird seduction of Xander," saying it's "cruel, something that Buffy has never been before or will be again. There’s a catharsis at the close when she destroys the Master’s bones which feels earned, but the road to that moment is littered with bumps."

"When She Was Bad" was ranked at #105 on Paste Magazine's "Every Episode Ranked" list and #109 on BuzzFeed's "Ranking Every Episode Of Buffy The Vampire Slayer" list.
