= Some Assembly Required (Buffy the Vampire Slayer) =

- Buffy the Vampire Slayer episode
- Episode no.: Season 2 Episode 2
- Directed by: Bruce Seth Green
- Written by: Ty King
- Production code: 5V02
- Original air date: September 22, 1997

Guest appearances
- Robia LaMorte as Jenny Calendar; Angelo Spizzirri as Chris Epps; Michael Bacall as Eric Gittleson; Ingo Neuhaus as Daryl Epps; Melanie MacQueen as Mrs. Epps; Amanda Wilmshurst as Joy

Episode chronology
← Previous "When She Was Bad"	Next → "School Hard"
- Buffy the Vampire Slayer season 2

"Some Assembly Required" is episode two of season two of Buffy the Vampire Slayer. The episode aired on The WB on September 22, 1997. It was written by staff writer Ty King and directed by Bruce Seth Green. The narrative follows the Scooby Gang as they find body parts all over Sunnydale High School. They follow the trail of the clues to find something more gruesome. Meanwhile, Buffy confronts Angel about their relationship, Willow admits that she loves Xander to Buffy and Ms. Calendar and Giles' romance begins to blossom, as she asks him on a date. There's only one problem: their date is interrupted by schoolmate Eric and his sinister plans.

== Plot ==
Buffy is waiting for a vampire to rise when she falls into an open grave. A body was apparently dragged out from it earlier.

The next day, Buffy and Xander catch Giles practicing to ask Jenny Calendar out on a date. (Buffy: "I guess we never realized how much you like that chair.")

Giles hears Buffy's findings at the cemetery and fears someone is raising an army of zombies. Buffy goes to find Willow, who is signing up for the science fair and talking to Chris, the reigning champ. As Buffy approaches, Chris's friend Eric takes pictures of girls passing by.

Willow finds that the girl missing from the open grave, Meredith Todd, died in a car accident. That night, Cordelia is walking to her car when she senses that someone is following her. She hides in a dumpster and when she thinks it is safe to get out, she encounters Angel. He starts to help her out of the garbage when she picks up a girl's hand, and they find other body parts inside the dumpster. The Scoobies return to the library to find a frightened Cordelia clinging to Angel. They decide to abandon Giles's zombie theory and search the lockers of science students. They find an article on Meredith in Chris's locker and a jigsaw of female body parts in Eric's locker.

In a secret lab, Chris and Eric are almost finished assembling a girl's body, except for the head. Eric lines up three candidates: Buffy, Willow and Cordelia. Chris's brother Daryl comes out from the shadows and chooses Cordelia. Daryl was a popular athlete who died in a hiking accident years ago, but he was revived by his brother and promised a stay-at-home companion.

The next day, Giles stumbles as he tries to ask Jenny out, but she ends up asking him to the football game instead. Meanwhile, Buffy and her friends discover that Chris and Eric must actually kill a girl to gain the head they need.

Buffy finds a lab in Chris's house and discovers their target is Cordelia. In the locker room, Cordelia is getting ready when Chris comes up behind her. Eric places a bag over her head, but is fought off by Buffy. After Cordelia leaves, Chris tells Buffy about Daryl. They head back to his house, only to find Daryl gone.

Daryl and Eric have gone to abduct Cordelia from the football game. Daryl drags her away when she is alone under bleachers and takes her to an abandoned building, where Eric plans to behead her. At the game, Chris tells Buffy where to find Eric.

Meanwhile, Willow and Xander crash Giles and Jenny’s date. Chris tells them what happened, while Buffy rushes to the old science lab. In the ensuing fight, a burner is knocked over and starts a fire. Xander arrives with the rest of the gang and gets Cordelia out. As Daryl is about to kill Buffy, Chris stops him. Daryl decides to die beside the unfinished girl's body while everyone else escapes.

== Continuity ==
=== Arc significance ===
Vox notes that the episode is "nothing earth-shaking, but it does see Giles and Jenny on their first date, and it lays some groundwork for Xander and Cordelia's relationship later in the season."

== Reception ==
"Some Assembly Required" had an audience of 3.2 million households.

Vox ranked it at #118 on their "Every Episode Ranked From Worst to Best" list (to mark the 20th anniversary of the show), writing that it's "a solid entry into the goofy/campy/silly stretch of early Buffy."

The episode received mixed reviews. Billie Doux complained about "the lame Frankenstein monster plot": "I've never understood why mad scientists cut the bodies up and sew mismatched pieces together before flipping the switch. Wouldn't they have more luck with reanimating a complete dead body, like Chris did with his brother?" She also praises Charisma Carpenter for "her ability to scream convincingly on cue." Roger Pocock agreed, saying, "The supernatural Hellmouth location is an effective sticking plaster for a lot of otherwise absurd story ideas, but instead the script plays fast and loose with what is even remotely scientifically possible in a way that feels at least a couple of decades behind its time." However, "The trio's twisted expression of the human mating impulse is offered up in stark contrast to some real new relationships, just getting started. The attraction between Buffy and Angel continues to be an effective slow-burn, while Giles agonising over asking Jenny on a date is the highlight of the episode."

Mike Loschiavo called Eric and Chris "the California version of Burke and Hare" and adds, "it was inevitable though; we had to have an episode that was about Frankenstein at some point." Theresa Basile lists it among her "10 Underrated Episodes of Buffy the Vampire Slayer," saying, "the villain of the week is not totally monstrous but rather sympathetic, even though we condemn his actions. Angel is a complete dork which is how I like him best."
