= I, Robot... You, Jane =

- Buffy the Vampire Slayer episode
- Episode no.: Season 1 Episode 8
- Directed by: Stephen Posey
- Written by: Ashley Gable; Thomas A. Swyden
- Production code: 4V08
- Original air date: April 28, 1997

Guest appearances
- Robia LaMorte as Jenny Calendar; Chad Lindberg as Dave; Jamison Ryan as Fritz; Pierrino Mascarino as Thelonius; Edith Fields as School Nurse; Mark Deakins (voice) and Michael Deak as Moloch; Joss Whedon as Newscaster

Episode chronology
← Previous "Angel"	Next → "The Puppet Show"
- Buffy the Vampire Slayer season 1

"I, Robot...You, Jane" is the eighth episode of season 1 of the television series Buffy the Vampire Slayer. The episode was written by staff writers Ashley Gable and Thomas A. Swyden, and directed by Stephen Posey. The episode originally aired on The WB on April 28, 1997.

In this episode, Buffy and Giles face a demon spirit who has been trapped since the Dark Ages and is unleashed into cyberspace. Meanwhile, Willow has fallen for a cyber-beau whom she met online and Xander and Buffy are wary of who this anonymous wooer may turn out to be.

== Plot ==
In Cortona, Italy, in 1418, a circle of priests trap a horned demon (Moloch "the Corruptor") in a book using a magic ritual. The book is sealed in a box, with the head priest expressing the hope that the book will never be read, lest the demon be released upon the world. In the present, the book is delivered to Giles and added to a pile that Willow is scanning into a computer.

Willow tells Buffy that she has formed an online relationship with a boy named Malcolm. As Buffy tries to warn Willow about the dangers of rushing into a relationship with someone she has not seen, Fritz, a geeky student, is instructed by Moloch, via the computer he is working on, to keep watch on Buffy. Later, when Xander asks Willow if she will accompany him to the Bronze, she passes, preferring to talk to Malcolm. When Willow arrives late the next day, Buffy finds that she missed classes to talk to "Malcolm". Suspecting that Malcolm might be catfishing Willow, Buffy asks Dave for help in finding out Malcolm's real identity, but his angry response causes her to suspect that he is Malcolm. When Buffy asks Giles for help, he confesses he cannot help her much as he finds technology to be intimidating.

Willow becomes suspicious of Malcolm after she learns that he knows Buffy was kicked out of her old school, and logs off the conversation. Back at the library, Giles discovers that Moloch's book is blank. He realizes that when Willow had scanned the book, the Corruptor had been loosed into the internet.

Outside of school, Dave tells Buffy that Willow wants to talk to her in the girls' locker room. At the last minute, Dave has a change of heart and warns Buffy that she is about to be electrocuted. In the library, Giles tells Buffy and Xander that demons can be imprisoned in books; if the books are read aloud, the demons are set free. Giles also explains that Moloch is an extremely powerful and seductive demon, winning his victims over with false promises of love, glory and power. Buffy and Giles realize that there is no limit to the destruction that a demon could do through the Internet.

After they find Dave's body, an apparent suicide, Xander and Buffy go to Willow's house; but she is not there. Buffy tells Giles to ask the computer teacher Jenny Calendar for help, hoping that between his knowledge of demons and her knowledge of computers, they can re-imprison Moloch. Willow has been kidnapped by Fritz and taken to a defunct computer company where a team of technicians and programmers has built Moloch a robot body that looks like the one on the cover of the book in which he had been imprisoned.

Giles seeks help from Jenny, and is surprised that she is already aware of the demon in the Internet. They cast a binding spell via computer, but it does not go as planned. Moloch is yanked out of the internet but into his robotic body, not back into the Moloch book as Giles had expected.

The robotic incarnation of Moloch crashes through a wall of the computer laboratory and attacks Buffy, Willow and Xander. After a brief battle, Buffy tricks Moloch into punching a high voltage power line. This causes his body to explode, presumably destroying him for good.

The next day, Buffy, Willow and Xander joke about how the Hellmouth is screwing with their love lives, before seriously wondering if they will ever find true happiness.

== Cultural references ==
The title simultaneously refers to Isaac Asimov's I, Robot and Tarzan the Ape Man, in which Tarzan allegedly says, "Me Tarzan, you Jane."

Xander quotes, "With a Little Help from My Friends," the title of the 1967 song by The Beatles.

Buffy tells Giles, "My spider sense is tingling," Spider-Man's catchphrase.

== Broadcast and reception ==
"I, Robot... You, Jane" was first broadcast on The WB on April 28, 1997. It received a Nielsen rating of 2.3 on its original airing.

Vox ranked it at #142 on their "Every Episode Ranked From Worst to Best" list of all 144 episodes (to mark the 20th anniversary of the show), writing, "The internet is possessed by a demon robot, and wow are we in 1997. 'I, Robot' is the first episode to really spotlight Willow, and she's such a lovely and complex character that saddling her with this piece of '90s low kitsch is a bit of a letdown. On the plus side, it also introduces us to Jenny Calendar."

Noel Murray of The A.V. Club was critical of the episode, giving it a grade of D+ because it was "corny, tonally off and lacking even the illusion of depth that other slack episodes have provided in Season One". He felt that it was "frustrating in its lack of extra levels, because there are so many places that episode could've gone", and also found some "odd" things about the episode, such as the sudden appearance of other students in the library. However, he was positive towards the final scene and Ms. Calendar. DVD Talk's Phillip Duncan was more positive, writing that "What could have easily been a silly plot is made all the better with an excellent set-up, the introduction of another key player, and the continued focus on characters other than Buffy." A review from the BBC was also positive, writing, "Although the plot is rather tired and seems to belong to the Cyberspace-obsessed eighties, it's given a unique Buffy The Vampire Slayer spin or three to create a very satisfying episode." The review praised the focus on Willow and the way Moloch was presented.

Rolling Stone ranked "I, Robot... You, Jane" at #129 on their "Every Episode Ranked From Worst to Best" list, writing there are only a few times when Buffy the Vampire Slayer is actively bad, "but sadly, this episode here is one of them. Our first Willow-centric episode (and by far the weakest) is so tragically 1990s it’s almost laughable. A demon has escaped into the internet, intent on wreaking havoc while amassing followers, including Willow, who is unaware of his true identity. Everyone’s favorite soon-to-be-witch deserved so much better than this, but thankfully, her character would undergo infinitely more exploration in the future."

"I, Robot... You, Jane" was ranked at #131 on Paste Magazine's "Every Episode Ranked" list and #133 on BuzzFeed's "Ranking Every Episode" list.

== Notes ==
1.The website This Day in Quotes explains, "It's a misquote because Weissmuller didn't actually say the line in that film or any of the other Tarzan movies he starred in between 1932 and 1948. Nor does the line "Me Tarzan, you Jane" appear in any of the original Tarzan stories or books written by Edgar Rice Burroughs. But Weissmuller did say it, jokingly, in an interview published in the June 1932 issue of Photoplay magazine. He told the Photoplay reporter: "I didn't have to act in Tarzan, the Ape Man — just said, 'Me Tarzan, you Jane.' After that, his quip became an oft-used comic catchphrase that many people mistakenly assume came from one of Weissmuller's Tarzan movies."
