= Master (Buffy the Vampire Slayer) =

The Master
- Buffy the Vampire Slayer / Angel character
- Mark Metcalf as The Master
- First appearance: "Welcome to the Hellmouth" (1997)
- Last appearance: "Last Gleaming" (2010)
- Created by: Joss Whedon
- Portrayed by: Mark Metcalf
- Voiced by: D. C. Douglas

In-universe information
- Affiliation: The Order of Aurelius
- Classification: Vampire
- Notable powers: Supernatural strength, speed, stamina, agility, and reflexes, acute sensory perception, rapid healing and immortality. Telepathy, telekinesis and hypnosis.

The Master is a fictional character on the action-horror/fantasy television series Buffy the Vampire Slayer (1997–2003). He is a centuries-old vampire portrayed by Mark Metcalf, determined to open the portal to hell below Sunnydale High School in the fictional town of Sunnydale. The Master is the first season's Big Bad (overarching villain).

The Master has been entombed beneath Sunnydale for 60 years as the patriarch of a cult posed opposite Buffy. He is devoted to the vampire race's purpose to eradicate humanity and to fulfilling a prophecy that states he will kill the Slayer in the late 20th century.

== Creation and casting ==
Buffy the Vampire Slayer was originally conceived from a 1992 feature film that pitched Buffy against a similar villain controlling vampires below Los Angeles. Disappointed by the final film, screenwriter and series creator Joss Whedon reworked his script into a television series more in line with his original vision. He and the staff writers employ horror elements in the series to represent real-life conflicts for the adolescent characters, while frequently undercutting the horror aspect of the show with comedy. Sunnydale High School is situated atop a portal to hell called a Hellmouth, which Whedon uses to symbolize the high-school-as-hell experience. Pragmatically, Whedon admitted that placing the high school on a Hellmouth allows the writers to confront the main characters with an endless array of evil creatures.

Veteran character actor Mark Metcalf appeared in heavy prosthetic make-up for the role of the Master, belying his iconic performance in the film National Lampoon's Animal House (1978) as Douglas C. Neidermeyer, a strident rule-following ROTC officer (and the associated role in Twisted Sister's "We're Not Going to Take It" music video). In 2011, Metcalf acknowledged that his Animal House role would probably live much longer than he, but also recognized his roles on Seinfeld—where he plays a similarly named character called "Maestro"—and Buffy the Vampire Slayer as his favorites. Many actors auditioned for the part, but Metcalf, according to Whedon, played it with more complexity, bringing a "sly and kind of urbane" sensitivity and a charm to the villainy of the character.

== Appearances ==
The Master is first seen in the series premiere "Welcome to the Hellmouth", which was aired immediately before the second episode "The Harvest", which reveals more of the Master's character and backstory. Although the Master's identity is never revealed on screen, Joss Whedon wrote in the pilot's script that his name was Heinrich Joseph Nest, roughly 600 years old. This contradicts information presented in the first season that indicates The Master predates written history, as is discussed below.

In "Welcome to the Hellmouth" the Master is presented as a vampire king with extraordinary physical and mental powers that grew as he ages but weakened through long isolation and needing to feed on people; he is raised from a pool of blood by his acolyte Luke (Brian Thompson). The head of a cult who worships the ancient pure demons "The Old Ones" called the Order of Aurelius, the Master attempted to open the Hellmouth in 1937, placing himself in a Catholic mission to do so. An earthquake swallowed the mission during the Master's attempt, and he has been living in the ruins for 60 years. He is trapped between dimensions, unable to leave his underground lair, so he commands his minions to find people for him to feed off while planning his escape. In times, Sunnydale High School is built over where the mission was.

The Master's incarceration underground was a device used by the writers to avoid having Buffy meet him and then thwart his attempts to kill her each week. Whedon was concerned that audiences would consider this implausible and that weekly confrontations would leave no tension for the season finale when Buffy and the Master would finally meet and battle each other.

In "The Harvest", employing a ritualized dark ceremony which can be used only once in a century, the Master makes Luke his "vessel": every time Luke feeds, power will be transmitted to the Master. Luke goes to the Bronze, the local nightclub frequented by Buffy and her friends, and begins to feed on the patrons before Buffy — following a delay caused by getting grounded by her mother — can kill him. Although Luke successfully feeds on a couple of victims, Buffy stakes him, thereby leaving the Master contained, robbed of his proxy, and with insufficient power to break the dimensional barrier that confines him underground.

The majority of vampires on the series have a human face that can turn into what Whedon and the characters call "vamp face". When shown immediately before feeding, the vampire characters transform with prosthetic make-up and computer-generated effects, giving them prominent brows and cheekbones, sharpened yellow teeth, and yellow eyes. Whedon intended to use the vamp face to be able to place vampires around Buffy in different locations — especially at school — to highlight the element of surprise by illustrating that the characters often face friends and peers who appear normal, but have dark sides. Simultaneously, the vamp face shows that Buffy is killing monsters instead of people.

Whedon made a decision to have the Master in permanent vamp face to indicate that he is so ancient he predates humanity. The Master never shows a human face; the make-up specialist conceived him as bat-like, intentionally making him look more like an animal. His facial make-up, bald head, extremely long fingernails, and black costume all refer directly to the 1922 German Expressionist film Nosferatu, directed by F. W. Murnau. Like the vampire of that film, Count Orlok, the Master lives in a state of furious isolation from which he is desperate to escape. According to author Matthew Pateman, the Master's presentation underscores both his great age and his European-ness — he is emphatically Old World. Even so, as a result of his entrapment in the New World, he adapts and shows himself able to incorporate American technology into his plans. He also (perhaps anachronistically) speaks with a modern American accent.

== Religiosity ==
In "Never Kill a Boy on the First Date" the Master reads from a formally written Bible-like book of prophecy that foretells the arrival of a powerful warrior enigmatically named "The Anointed One" (Andrew J. Ferchland) who will become the Master's "greatest weapon against the Slayer". The Master sends other acolytes of the Order of Aurelius to bring The Anointed to him, instructing them to give their lives should it become necessary for them to succeed. When Buffy finally encounters him in the season finale, The Anointed One turns out to inhabit the body of a little boy. The Master instructs the boy in the influence of fear ("Nightmares") and power ("Angel").

Buffy studies scholars have noted the role religion plays in the series, and have commented on the Master's sense of religiosity in particular. With the exception of Angel (David Boreanaz), none of the main characters exhibit any prominent religious views although they observe some religious holidays. Several of the villains in the series, however, are nearly fanatical about religious ritual and custom, the first of which is the Master. The rituals the Master performs to make Luke his vessel are, according to Wendy Love Anderson, an "inversion of Christianity". The Master attempts to restore the "old ones" and aligns himself with a child while setting up Buffy to be a Christ-like figure. He foretells that when he is able to leave his mystical prison, "the stars themselves will hide", an aberration of a line from John Milton's epic poem Paradise Lost, where Satan is musing on his own power. The Master's entombment in a house of worship is a convenient vehicle to introduce the character's religiosity, but it also represents the way evil is at times allowed to thrive in churches. (Note: The Master's entombment also recalls Jewish apocalypse stories which can be found in the Book of Enoch. (Stevenson p. 66–68.)) The unChristian symbolism was intentional on Whedon's part, as he was cautious about including such subversive imagery in "The Harvest"; Buffy producer David Greenwalt was certain Christian groups would protest the ceremonial aspects of the plot. Gregory Erickson notes that the Master's denigration of a Christian cross, what he calls the "two pieces of wood" even while being burned by it, reflects the series' treatment of Christianity overall and in turn, the American simplification of religion. On Buffy, a cross is a weapon, but beyond that is an empty symbol. Christian symbols and rituals traditionally play an integral role in many vampire stories, as in Bram Stoker's Dracula. Conversely, Buffy downplays their importance.

== Demise ==
The Master sends minions to kill Buffy in "Angel", an episode featuring the origin story of Buffy's romantic interest, a vampire with a murderous past who was re-ensouled by a Gypsy tribe as the ultimate punishment; this "curse" has caused him to feel remorse and live the past century in misery and torment. His desire for redemption, as well as his attraction to Buffy, compels him to assist her. She discovers he is a vampire in "Angel" and it is revealed that one of the Master's most powerful followers, Darla (Julie Benz), was the vampire who transformed Angel and was his lover for several generations. After the Master allows Darla to destroy the minions who failed to kill Buffy, Darla tries to lure Angel to the Master's side, but Angel stakes and kills her, further thwarting the Master's plans.

Buffy and the Master finally meet in the season finale "Prophecy Girl", in which Giles translates a prophecy that states that if she fights the Master, she will die. Buffy overhears Giles discussing it with Angel and tells Giles she refuses to be the Slayer if it means she will die, then begs her mother to go away with her for the weekend. After five students are murdered by more of the Master's followers, however, Buffy decides she must fight the Master and is led to his underground lair by The Anointed One; she is wearing a long white dress, bought for a dance she was supposed to attend instead. He quickly hypnotizes her and tells her that "prophecies are tricky things" that don't reveal all: had she not come to fight him, he could not rise, as it is her blood which will free him. He bites and drinks from her, then tosses her to the ground face-down in a shallow pool where she drowns. Angel and Buffy's friend Xander (Nicholas Brendon), who have disobeyed her wishes and followed her, arrive after the Master has risen. Xander is able to revive Buffy through CPR, thus the prophecy of her death at the Master's hands is fulfilled, but its intention thwarted. She becomes stronger as a result of their encounter.

An extension of the Master's religiosity is his preoccupation with prophecies. The themes of the first season are destiny and forming an identity separate from childhood: breaking the illusions that the world is safe and actions have no real consequences. Destiny is repeatedly a theme between Buffy and the Master. The entire first season is underscored with prophecies — a narrative device used less frequently in later seasons of the series — that Buffy neglects to fulfill in various ways. Buffy often has prophetic dreams and the Master is nearly obsessed with recounting and confirming written prophecies. Buffy's superhuman powers are her birthright. Despite her desire to live a normal life she feels compelled to fulfill her destiny as a Slayer, and the need for her to live up to this responsibility is reinforced by Giles. Buffy, however, subverts these elements to assert her own free will, which is illustrated in the season finale. According to Buffy studies scholar Gregory Stevenson, the Master has such confidence in the prophecy that the Slayer will die that he is unable to comprehend her resurrection by Xander.

When the Master rises, the Hellmouth opens in the floor of the school library where Giles, Buffy's friends Willow (Alyson Hannigan), Cordelia (Charisma Carpenter), and a teacher, Jenny Calendar (Robia LaMorte) are present and fighting off the emerging monsters. Buffy finds the Master on the roof of the library watching through the octagonal windows in the ceiling. Incredulous upon her arrival, he tells her she was destined to die in a written prophecy. She replies "What can I say? I flunked the written." She is now able to resist his attempts to hypnotize her and pushes him through the skylight into the library below, impaling him on a broken wooden table and killing him.

== Later appearances ==
Following his death, the Master makes several appearances in the series, and his presence is still palpable in early second season episodes. In the second season premiere Buffy has still not exorcised the trauma she experienced in her confrontation with the Master, and is masking her anxiety by being hostile towards her friends. She has her catharsis by smashing his bones with a sledgehammer. The Anointed One remains alive until killed by a vampire named Spike (James Marsters) in "School Hard".

In the third season, "The Wish" presents audiences with an alternate reality in Sunnydale: after dating Xander and breaking up, Cordelia expresses to Anyanka (Emma Caulfield), a vengeance demon, a wish to live in a Sunnydale where Buffy never arrived. In this reality the town is overrun with vampires loyal to the successfully risen Master who, in a capitalistic turn, has devised a machine to make an assembly line to bleed humans to feed his followers, thereby freeing them of the need to hunt humans. In this Sunnydale, very powerful vampires Willow and Xander are his favorites. Near the end of the episode, a very different Buffy arrives, friendless and fighting alone, and when she confronts the Master, she falls quickly under his hypnotic powers and is killed when he snaps her neck (again fulfilling the prophecy that in their fight, she will die).

In the seventh season premiere of Buffy, "Lessons", the Master appears once more as a face of the First Evil, a shape-shifting villain and the Big Bad of the final season.

Metcalf also guest-starred on the Buffy spinoff series Angel in the second season episode "Darla", which goes into more detail about Darla's human life and her transformation into a vampire at the Master's hands.

In the canonical comic book series, it is revealed that the Master has been resurrected off-screen by the Seed of Wonder as its guardian at some point after the first season's finale. He is eventually killed again by a far more powerful rogue higher power, Twilight.

The Master appears in the first Buffy video game, where he is resurrected by a necromancer as a spirit to act as the leader for the Old One Lybach's plot to build a bridge between his Hell dimension and Earth and lead an army of demons to Earth. The Master possesses Angel and uses the remnants of the Order of Aurelias and demons loyal to him to try to build the bridge. He is eventually exorcised from Angel by Buffy and Willow but survives in spirit form to continue on. After Buffy kills the Dreamers, the demons he's using to build the bridge, her friends perform a spell to make him corporeal and she is able to kill him once again.

== Influence ==
Joss Whedon created Buffy Summers to subvert the dual ideas of female subordination to patriarchy, and authority steeped in tradition, both dynamics well-established in the Master's world order. According to Buffy scholars, the Master is a classic villain. Rhonda Wilcox writes, "There could hardly be a nastier incarnation of the patriarchy than the ancient, ugly vampire Master", and Gregory Stevenson places him in the category of "absolute evil" with the second season's Judge (also Brian Thompson), third season's Mayor (Harry Groener), and fourth season's Adam (George Hertzberg). In contrast, other Buffy characters are more morally ambiguous.

The Master is a grand patriarch consumed with hierarchy, order, subservience, and is defined by what is old. Buffy's opposition to the Master addresses media tropes found in many horror films where a young, petite blonde woman, up against a male monster, is killed off partway through the film as a result of her own weakness.

The series also highlights the generational divide between the younger characters and the older ones. In particular, the dialogue, termed "Buffyspeak" by some media, frequently makes the younger characters indecipherable to the older ones. The Master speaks with a stylistic formality found in Bible verses. According to Wilcox, Buffy can hardly understand Giles' language, much less the Master's "pompous, quasi-religious remarks". The entire first season confronts the younger characters with the problems of impending adulthood, which they only begin reconcile in the last episodes of the season.

Each season finale signifies a turning point for the main characters — usually Buffy — and her confronting the Master, according to Stevenson, represents "the end of her childhood illusions of immortality". The scene is fraught with romantic imagery, with Buffy in a white gown, initially intended to be her party dress. When the Master bites her it is, according to Elisabeth Kirmmer and Shilpa Raval, her sexual initiation: a different take on the young girl dying at the hands of a monster. Kirmmer and Raval write that the "paradigm of Death and the Maiden is replaced by that of the hero who faces death and emerges stronger". When he tries to hypnotize her on the roof, she is able to resist him and kills him.

Buffy's willful behavior and tendency to buck tradition is further underscored by another Slayer who was brought up in the traditional Slayer path by her Watcher. In the mythos of the series, when one Slayer dies, another takes her place somewhere in the world. Buffy's brief death activated the Slayer Kendra (Bianca Lawson) in the second season. She is a committed, rule-abiding young woman who does everything authority figures tell her to do. Thus, she is fatally vulnerable to being hypnotized by Drusilla (Juliet Landau), an insane vampire with extraordinary mental abilities, who kills Kendra easily.

== Bibliography ==
- Dial-Driver, Emily; Emmons-Featherston, Sally; Ford, Jim; Taylor, Carolyn Anne (eds.) (2008), The Truth of Buffy: Essays on Fiction Illuminating Reality, McFarland & Company, Inc., Publishers. ISBN 978-0-7864-3799-3
- Golden, Christopher; Holder, Nancy (1998). Buffy the Vampire Slayer: The Watcher's Guide, Volume 1, Pocket Books. ISBN 0-671-02433-7
- Holder, Nancy; Mariotte, Jeff; Hart, Maryelizabeth (2000). Buffy the Vampire Slayer: The Watcher's Guide, Volume 2, Pocket Books. ISBN 0-671-04260-2
- Holder, Nancy; Mariotte, Jeff; Hart, Maryelizabeth (2002), Angel: The Casefiles, Volume 1, Simon & Schuster. ISBN 0-7434-2414-X
- Jowett, Lorna (2005). Sex and the Slayer: A Gender Studies Primer for the Buffy Fan, Wesleyan University Press. ISBN 978-0-8195-6758-1
- Kaveney, Roz (ed.) (2004). Reading the Vampire Slayer: The New, Updated, Unofficial Guide to Buffy and Angel, Tauris Parke Paperbacks. ISBN 1-86064-984-X
- Pateman, Matthew (2006). The Aesthetics of Culture in Buffy the Vampire Slayer, McFarland & Company. ISBN 0-7864-2249-1
- Ruditis, Paul (2004). Buffy the Vampire Slayer: The Watcher's Guide, Volume 3, Simon & Schuster. ISBN 0-689-86984-3
- South, James (ed.) (2003). Buffy the Vampire Slayer and Philosophy: Fear and Trembling in Sunnydale, Open Court Books. ISBN 0-8126-9531-3
- Stafford, Nikki (2007). Bite Me! The Unofficial Guide to Buffy the Vampire Slayer, ECW Press. ISBN 978-1-55022-807-6
- Stevenson, Gregory (2003). Televised Morality: The Case of Buffy the Vampire Slayer, Hamilton Books. ISBN 0-7618-2833-8
- Tracy, Kathleen (1998). The Girl's Got Bite: The Unofficial Guide to Buffy's World, Renaissance Books. ISBN 1-58063-035-9
- Wilcox, Rhonda (2005). Why Buffy Matters: The Art of Buffy the Vampire Slayer, I. B. Tauris. ISBN 1-84511-029-3
- Wilcox, Rhonda and Lavery, David (eds.) (2002). Fighting the Forces: What's at Stake in Buffy the Vampire Slayer, Rowman and Littlefield Publishers. ISBN 0-7425-1681-4
- Williamson, Milly (2005). The Lure of the Vampire: Gender, Fiction and Fandom from Bram Stoker to Buffy, Wallflower Press. ISBN 1-904764-40-1
