= Robot Bastard! =

- Poster art
- Directed by: Rob Schrab
- Written by: Rob Schrab
- Starring: Kurt Scholler; Chris Tallman; Robia LaMorte; Jeff B. Davis; Sean McKenna
- Release date: 2002
- Running time: 17 minutes
- Country: United States
- Language: English
- Budget: 18,000 $

Robot Bastard! is a 17-minute short film and Rob Schrab's directorial debut.

The film follows Robot Bastard on a mission to save the president's daughter, Catherine.
