= The Puppet Show (Buffy the Vampire Slayer) =

- Buffy the Vampire Slayer episode
- Episode no.: Season 1 Episode 9
- Directed by: Ellen S. Pressman
- Written by: Rob Des Hotel; Dean Batali
- Production code: 4V09
- Original air date: May 5, 1997

Guest appearances
- *Kristine Sutherland as Joyce Summers; *Richard Werner as Morgan Shay; Armin Shimerman as Principal Snyder; Burke Roberts as Marc; Tom Wyner as Sid the Dummy

Episode chronology
← Previous "I, Robot... You, Jane"	Next → "Nightmares"
- Buffy the Vampire Slayer season 1

"The Puppet Show" is the ninth episode of season 1 of the television series Buffy the Vampire Slayer. The episode aired on The WB on May 5, 1997. It was written by story editors Rob Des Hotel and Dean Batali, and directed by Ellen S. Pressman.

Sunnydale High School's annual talent show serves as a backdrop for murder when Buffy must catch a knife-wielding stealer of human organs. Meanwhile, the new principal is a discipline-loving brute who forces Giles to run the talent show and orders Buffy, Xander, and Willow to perform.

== Plot ==
Snyder, the new school principal, puts Giles in charge of the talent show and makes the Scoobies take part. They watch Morgan and his ventriloquist's dummy, Sid. The act takes a turn for the better when Sid suddenly appears to develop a personality and starts making sarcastic comments.

The scene cuts to Emily, a ballet dancer, alone in the changing rooms. She hears something, turns and screams as a demonic voice whispers, "I will be flesh". Snyder explains to Giles that he will run a safer, more disciplined school—but is interrupted by the discovery of Emily's body, whose heart has been cut out with a knife. The Scoobies debate whether the killer is a demon or a human.

The group splits up to interview people from the talent show to find the killer. Everything seems to point to Morgan. Buffy breaks into his locker, where she finds nothing and is reprimanded by Snyder, who becomes increasingly suspicious of her, as Morgan and Sid secretly watch her. Sid tells Morgan that Buffy is "the one", saying that her strength is evidence of it.

Sid sneaks into Buffy's room as she sleeps, but the noise of his wooden feet wakes her and she sees him. Buffy has a hard time convincing the Scoobies that Sid broke into her room. Giles suggests that the demon responsible might be needing the heart and later, a brain, to keep a human guise, which means the demon could be anyone.

In the library, just as Willow researches how animated dummies might be harvesting organs to become humans, Sid disappears. While searching for Sid, Buffy finds Morgan's body, missing the brain. A chandelier falls on her and Sid attacks, but during their fight she realizes that Sid believes she is the demon and that they are both working for the same goal: to stop the demon.

Sid explains that he is a demon hunter, cursed to dummy form until he kills the last of the Brotherhood of Seven: demons who must harvest a heart and a brain to remain in human form. Realizing the demon has what it needs, they theorize it will be moving on, and so its form will be that of whoever is missing from the talent show.

Sid tells Buffy that once they kill the demon, he will die, since his human body has long since crumbled to dust and bone. Buffy, Willow and Xander discover Morgan had brain cancer, and therefore the demon should now be looking for someone with a healthy, smart brain—someone like Giles.

At the talent show, Marc the magician tricks Giles into strapping himself into a guillotine, supposedly a stage magic prop. Buffy, Xander and Willow rush to rescue Giles, and with Sid's help they kill Marc — who was the demon all along. Sid finishes the demon by driving a knife through Marc's heart and collapses as his soul is freed. Buffy takes his dummy body into her arms just as the curtain opens, leaving the school audience, including Snyder, bewildered and confused at the Scoobies.

== Production ==
Vox notes that, during the closing credits, it has "Buffy's first and only tag scene, which sees the Scoobies doing the world's worst staged reading of Oedipus." The only other time the closing credits were altered was in "Once More, With Feeling," when the dance of the road sweepers was played instead of Nerf Herder's usual theme music.

Nicholas Brendon ad-libbed Xander using Sid the Dummy to reference Stephen King's The Shining with his exclamation, "Redrum! Redrum!" (i.e., "murder" backwards).

This is the fourth episode of the series without any vampires, after "Witch," "The Pack," and "I Robot, You Jane."

== Cultural references ==
Cordelia sings "The Greatest Love of All," the song made famous by Whitney Houston.

Xander says, "Does anybody else feel like they’ve been Keyser Söze'd?" This is a reference to the 1995 movie The Usual Suspects, in which Keyser Söze was the name of a legendary master criminal.

Buffy, Willow, and Xander perform a scene from the play Oedipus Rex. Xander plays Oedipus, Buffy plays Jocasta, and Willow plays the priest of Zeus.

== Continuity ==
Willow's stage fright is also observed in "Nightmares," in "Restless," in "The Yoko Factor," in "Real Me,"and to a lesser extent in "Once More, With Feeling," when she was the only main character not to sing a great deal.

== Broadcast and reception ==
"The Puppet Show" was first broadcast on The WB on May 5, 1997. It received a Nielsen rating of 1.9 on its original airing.

Vox ranked this episode at #113 out of the 144 Buffy episodes, in honor of the 20th anniversary of the show's ending, calling it "a weird, weird episode... [Sid] spends the first half of the episode skittering around creepily, and then in the second half he turns out to be secretly heroic and gets a poignant death scene. It's goofy and fun and not quite coherent, and always leaves me feeling a little like the newly introduced Principal Snyder: 'I don't get it. Is it avant-garde?'" Paste Magazine, in a similar list, ranked it at #84 and wrote, "A standard MoTW episode for much of its duration, 'The Puppet Show' is actually a nice bit of misdirection, and Snyder's appointment of Giles to oversee the talent show and his insistence that Cordelia, Willow, Xander and Buffy participate certainly helped them solve the mystery and slay the demon."

Noel Murray of The A.V. Club gave "The Puppet Show" a grade of C+, calling it "a reasonably entertaining, better-than-average piece of horror-comedy, even as it recycles the hoary old 'killer dummy' routine." He praised the twist and the comedy, but felt that its problem was that it "has nothing to offer beyond a few laughs and a few shocks". DVD Talk's Phillip Duncan wrote of the episode, "It seems like standard fare until the plot nears the end and the truth is revealed. It's another reversal of roles that keeps the show's format interesting."

A review from the BBC called it "a very inventive episode, and one of the best of the first season". The review praised how the direction was ambiguous in showing whether Sid was really alive, and praised the running joke of Buffy, Willow, and Xander having to participate in the talent show.

Rolling Stone ranked "The Puppet Show" at #127 on their "Every Episode Ranked From Worst to Best" list, calling it just another "super weird Season One episode that falls a little flat," and writes that the "premise is fun, but it doesn’t come close to sticking the landing."

"The Puppet Show" was ranked at #84 on Paste Magazine's "Every Episode Ranked" list and #79 on BuzzFeed's "Ranking Every Episode" list.
