= Unaired Buffy the Vampire Slayer pilot =

Unaired pilot
- Buffy the Vampire Slayer episode
- Directed by: Joss Whedon
- Written by: Joss Whedon

Guest appearances
- Nicole Bilderback as Cordette; Mercedes McNab as Harmony; Julie Benz as Darla; David Boreanaz as Angel (Deleted Scene); Stephen Tobolowsky as Principal Flutie; Persia White as Aura; Danny Strong as Jonathan

Episode chronology
← Previous —	Next → "Welcome to the Hellmouth"

The non-broadcast pilot episode of Buffy the Vampire Slayer was produced by 20th Century Fox Television in 1996 to pitch a series to networks. The twenty-five-and-a-half-minute production was written and directed by Buffy creator Joss Whedon, and was expanded upon and re-shot for the first episode of the series. It is notable for featuring different actors in the roles of Willow and Principal Flutie. Sunnydale High is known as Berryman High.

The plot concerns Buffy Summers' move to Sunnydale after being expelled from a school in Los Angeles. Buffy enters Sunnydale High and meets Cordelia, Willow, and Xander. Willow is lured by a vampire into a trap. Buffy shows up with Xander and kills all the vampires.

While a popular bootleg, Whedon has said the pilot episode will not be officially released, as he feels it is of poor quality.

== Plot ==
Buffy Summers begins her first day at Berryman High School, where she meets Principal Flutie, Xander Harris, Willow, and the British librarian, Mr. Giles. After class, Willow and Buffy walk through the school. Buffy asks her about the librarian. Willow says that Mr. Giles is new, "from some British museum". Cordelia and her gang interrupt them, attempting to get Buffy to join them and leave Willow.

Two other school girls, Aura and Aphrodesia, talk about the new girl while preparing for gym class. They are interrupted by a body falling out of a locker. Once the news reaches Buffy, she finds Principal Flutie and asks to see the body. When she finds the two holes in the neck, she heads for the library.

Mr. Giles is unsurprised by the news; instead, he is surprised that Buffy seems to be rejecting interest in Slaying. She angrily tells him that she loved her life before she knew about her calling, but after losing everything she valued, she now wants nothing to do with it. Xander overhears the conversation in the stacks.

That night, Buffy meets a stranger, who warns her that she is living on a Hellmouth. He also gives her a large silver cross.

The same night, Buffy asks Xander about Willow. Xander says that Willow has found a boyfriend. She quizzes Xander about the guy's appearance; when he mentions a 'Lionel Richie' look, Buffy runs off. Xander and Buffy hear Willow's scream from the auditorium. Buffy charges in, finds the blond vampire biting Willow, and attacks him. Two other vampires emerge. Xander and Willow attempt to escape, using a cross to scare the vamps. Buffy dispatches the vamps and announces she is "The Slayer". One vampire runs away, and Buffy is left to dispatch the blond vampire.

The next morning, Giles is unimpressed by Buffy's sloppy fighting and the fact that she allowed others to find out her identity as the Slayer. Willow and Xander defend her, but Buffy is unbothered.

== Cast ==
=== Starring ===
- Sarah Michelle Gellar as Buffy Summers
- Nicholas Brendon as Xander Harris
- Riff Regan as Willow Rosenberg
- Charisma Carpenter as Cordelia Chase
- Anthony Stewart Head as Rupert Giles

=== Guest starring ===
- David Boreanaz as Angel (Deleted Scene)
- Julie Benz as Darla
- Stephen Tobolowsky as Principal Flutie
- Nicole Bilderback as Cordette
- Mercedes McNab as Harmony Kendall
- Persia White as Aura
- Danny Strong as Jonathan Levinson
