= Welcome to the Hellmouth =

Pilot episode of Buffy the Vampire Slayer

- Buffy the Vampire Slayer episode
- Episode no.: Season 1 Episode 1
- Directed by: Charles Martin Smith
- Written by: Joss Whedon
- Cinematography by: Michael Gershman
- Editing by: Geoffrey Rowland
- Production code: 4V01
- Original air date: March 10, 1997
- Running time: 44 minutes

Guest appearances
- Mark Metcalf as the Master; Brian Thompson as Luke; David Boreanaz as Angel; Ken Lerner as Principal Bob Flutie; Kristine Sutherland as Joyce Summers; Julie Benz as Darla; J. Patrick Lawlor as Thomas; Eric Balfour as Jesse McNally; Persia White as Aura; Tupelo Jereme as Girl; Natalie Strauss as Teacher; Carmine Giovinazzo as Boy

Episode chronology
← Previous "Unaired Buffy the Vampire Slayer pilot"	Next → "The Harvest"
- Buffy the Vampire Slayer season 1

"Welcome to the Hellmouth" is the series premiere of the American supernatural drama television series Buffy the Vampire Slayer. It originally aired on The WB on March 10, 1997 in a two-hour premiere along with the following episode, "The Harvest". The episode was written by the series creator and executive producer Joss Whedon and directed by Charles Martin Smith. "Welcome to the Hellmouth" received a Nielsen rating of 3.4 upon its original airing and received largely positive reviews from critics.

Buffy Summers and her mom move to Sunnydale, California, for a fresh start, unaware of the evil lurking in this quiet suburb. Somewhat reluctant in her role as the Slayer, Buffy quickly makes friends and enemies at her new school. While also meeting her new "Watcher," Giles, the mercurial school librarian, her newly assembled team encounters the ever-abundant unearthly creatures in Sunnydale.

Joss Whedon developed Buffy the Vampire Slayer to invert the Hollywood formula of "the little blonde girl who goes into a dark alley and gets killed in every horror movie." The series was created after the 1992 film of the same name, in an attempt by Whedon to stay truer to his original ideas. Whedon wrote and directed a 25-minute unaired pilot in 1996, some of the dialogue and story of which was reused in the episode. Many scenes were filmed on location in Los Angeles, California. The high school used for external and some internal scenes in the series is Torrance High School, the same school used for the series Beverly Hills, 90210.

== Plot ==
At night, a boy named Chris Boal (Carmine Giovinazzo) breaks into Sunnydale High School with a girl, Darla (Julie Benz). Although she appears nervous, Chris reassures her that they are alone. Suddenly, Darla reveals her true vampire face and kills him.

Buffy Summers (Sarah Michelle Gellar) wakes from a nightmare on the morning of her first day at Sunnydale High School. Her mother, Joyce (Kristine Sutherland), drives her to school and encourages her to stay positive. In his office, Principal Bob Flutie (Ken Lerner) reviews Buffy's permanent record, noting she burned down her previous school's gym. When asked about the incident, Buffy nearly reveals it involved vampires but quickly attributes it to "asbestos."

After leaving the principal's office, Buffy bumps into another student, spilling the contents of her purse onto the floor. Xander Harris (Nicholas Brendon) helps her gather her belongings and introduces himself. Buffy unknowingly leaves behind her stake, which Xander tries to return, but she has already walked away.

In class, Buffy is befriended by popular student Cordelia Chase (Charisma Carpenter), who quizzes her on fashion and social trends after learning she is from Los Angeles. Buffy becomes uncomfortable when Cordelia publicly mocks Willow Rosenberg (Alyson Hannigan) at the water fountain. Inside the library, Buffy meets the new librarian, Rupert Giles (Anthony Head), who presents her with a book titled Vampyr. Realizing he knows her true identity, Buffy quickly leaves.

During a break, Buffy meets with Willow, Jesse McNally (Eric Balfour), and Xander, who returns her stake. Buffy explains it is a common self-defense weapon in Los Angeles. Cordelia informs Buffy that gym class has been canceled due to an "extreme dead guy" found in a student's locker. When Buffy asks if there were any marks on the body, Cordelia becomes alarmed. Buffy forces her way into the locker room, examines the body, and finds the characteristic puncture wounds of a vampire on his neck. She returns to the library and confronts Giles, who informs her that he is her new Watcher. Buffy refuses to accept her calling as the Slayer, blaming it for her expulsion and troubled social life. After they leave, a confused Xander emerges from behind the shelves, having overheard their conversation.

That night Buffy goes to The Bronze, Sunnydale's popular hangout, where she meets a mysterious stranger named Angel (David Boreanaz). He warns Buffy that she lives on a Hellmouth about to open and that "the Harvest" is coming. He also gives her a large silver cross pendant. Inside The Bronze, Buffy reunites with Willow and urges her to seize the moment. Buffy then finds Giles and tells him about Angel. Giles advises her to hone her ability to sense when vampires are nearby. Using her understanding of fashion trends rather than her Slayer instincts, Buffy positively identifies a vampire (J. Patrick Lawlor) in the club, (to Giles' mild frustration,) and becomes alarmed when Willow leaves with him. She loses sight of them and is startled by Cordelia, whom she nearly stakes before scaring her off. Meanwhile, Jesse chats with Darla on the dance floor. While searching for Willow, Buffy encounters Xander and convinces him to help.

Beneath the streets of Sunnydale, the Master (Mark Metcalf), an ancient and powerful vampire, is awakened by his followers to prepare for the Harvest. He sends Luke (Brian Thompson) to gather fresh victims. The vampire lures Willow to a cemetery and traps her inside a crypt, where they are joined by Darla and a weakened Jesse, who has already been bitten. Buffy and Xander arrive, and Buffy kills the vampire attacking Willow. As Darla and Buffy fight, Xander helps Jesse and Willow escape. Luke arrives and overpowers Buffy, throwing her into a wall. During the ensuing fight, Darla flees the crypt. Luke then traps Buffy in a stone coffin and moves in to bite her.

== Production ==
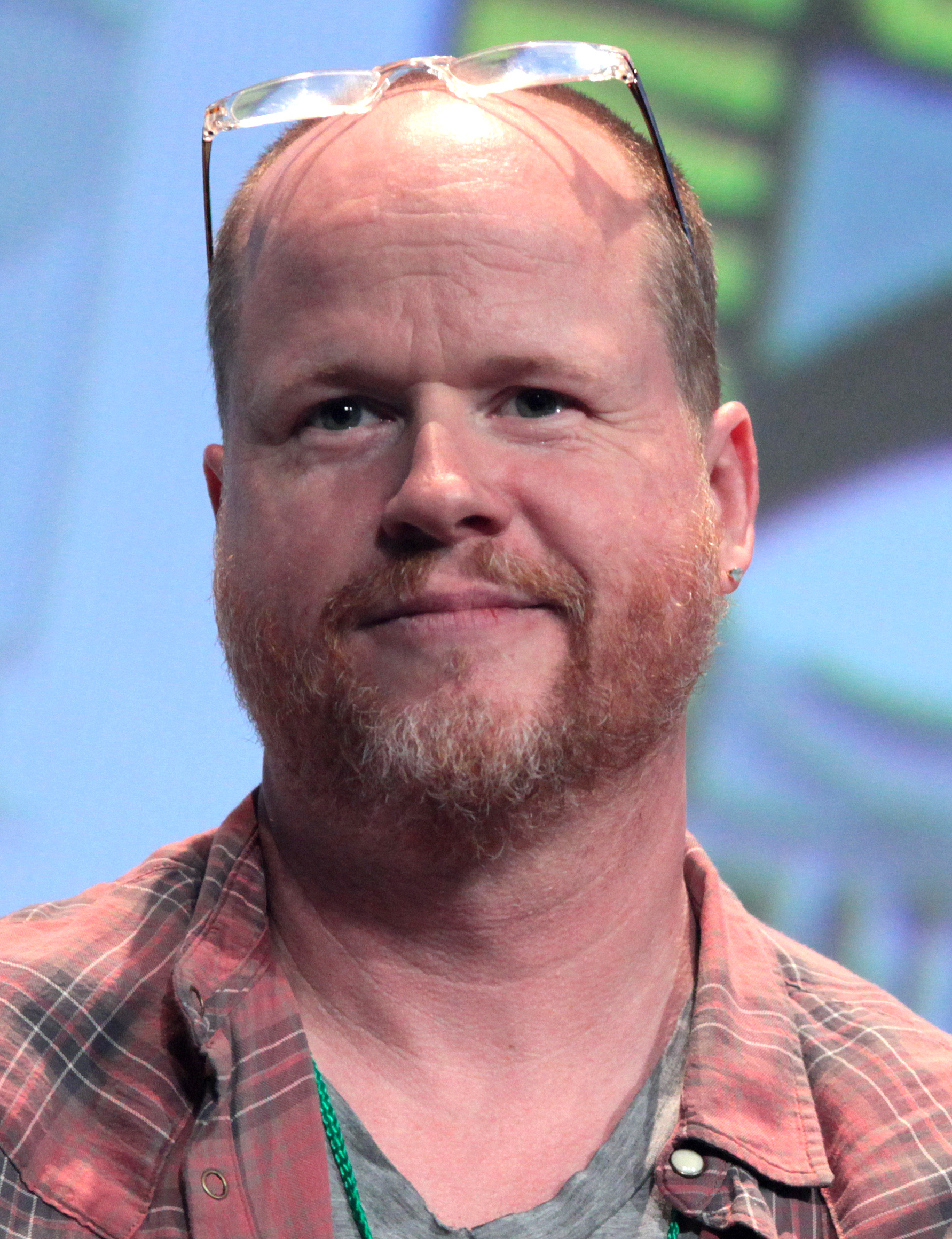
Buffy creator Joss Whedon also served as executive producer, head writer, and director on the series.

=== Background and writing ===
Writer Joss Whedon says that "Rhonda the Immortal Waitress" was really the first incarnation of the Buffy concept, "just the idea of some woman who seems to be completely insignificant who turns out to be extraordinary". This early, unproduced idea evolved into Buffy, an inversion of the Hollywood formula of "the little blonde girl who goes into a dark alley and gets killed in every horror movie". Whedon wanted "to subvert that idea and create someone who was a hero". He explained, "The very first mission statement of the show was the joy of female power: having it, using it, sharing it".

The idea was first visited through Whedon's script for the 1992 movie Buffy the Vampire Slayer, which featured Kristy Swanson in the title role. The director, Fran Rubel Kuzui, saw it as a "pop culture comedy about what people think about vampires". Whedon disagreed: "I had written this scary film about an empowered woman, and they turned it into a broad comedy. It was crushing."

Several years later, Gail Berman, a Fox executive, approached Whedon to develop his Buffy concept into a television series. Whedon explained that "They said, 'Do you want to do a show?' And I thought, 'High school as a horror movie'. And so the metaphor became the central concept behind Buffy, and that's how I sold it." The supernatural elements in the series stood as metaphors for personal anxieties associated with adolescence and young adulthood. Early in its development, the series was going to be simply titled Slayer. Whedon went on to write and partly fund a 25-minute non-broadcast pilot that was shown to networks and eventually sold to the WB Network. Buffy the Vampire Slayer first aired on March 10, 1997, as a mid season replacement for the show Savannah on The WB network, and played a key role in the growth of the Warner Bros. television network in its early years. Whedon has declared in June 2003 that the non-broadcast pilot would not be included with DVDs of the series "while there is strength in these bones," stating that it "sucks on ass."

=== Music ===
The episode, being the series premiere, features the first usage of the theme song by pop punk band Nerf Herder. Parry Gripp, the band's songwriter, guitarist, and admitted fan of the show explained that the band created the theme song after "fancy pants Hollywood" failed to write a theme song that the producers approved. Eventually, "they [the producers] asked a bunch of local, small time bands who they could pay very little money to come up with some ideas and they liked our idea and they used it." Several songs by the band Sprung Monkey play during the episode. When Buffy is deciding what to wear, the song "Saturated" is playing faintly in the background. At The Bronze, the band plays their songs "Believe", "Swirl", and "Things are Changing". All of the songs featured in the episode can be found on their 1995 album Swirl. The score for the episode, as well as all first season entries, was created by Walter Murphy.

=== Casting and filming ===
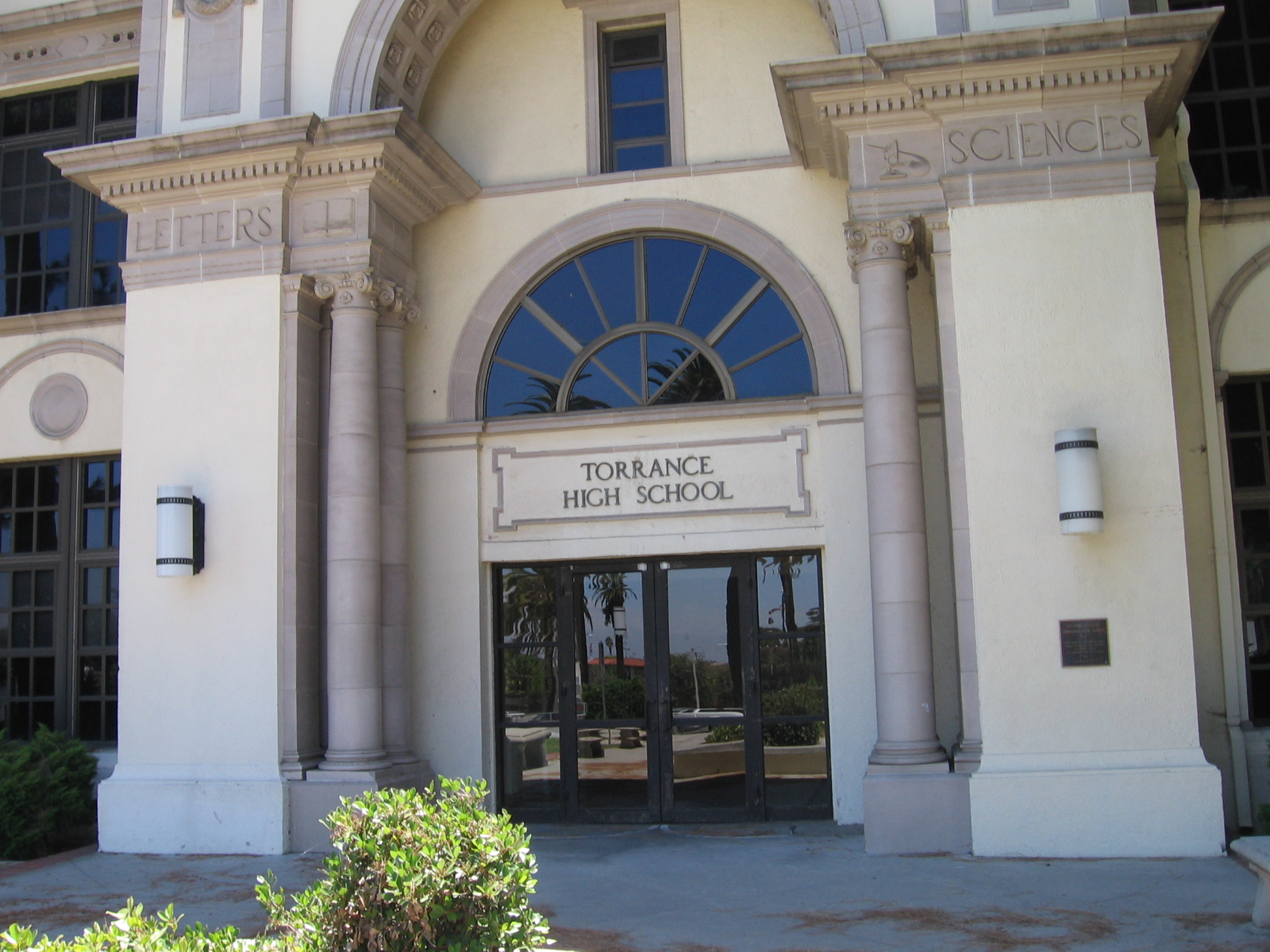
Torrance High School stood in for Sunnydale High.

Whedon explained that several of the characters that appeared in the series were based on real-life individuals. Cordelia, for instance, was modeled after a girl with whom Whedon's wife attended high school. Xander was based on Whedon himself. Whedon hoped to include actor Eric Balfour in the title credits to shock viewers when his character dies. Unfortunately, the show could not afford the extra set of title credits at the time. However, Whedon's wish was granted in the season 6 episode "Seeing Red", with the character Tara Maclay (Amber Benson). Brian Thompson, who plays the vampire Luke, returns to the series in season 2 as a different character, the Judge, in "Surprise" and "Innocence".

In the original, non-broadcast pilot, Willow was portrayed by Riff Regan. However, network executives requested that Regan be replaced. Willow's character demanded that she be shy and unsure of herself, and the casting department encountered some difficulty finding actresses who could portray this effectively and still be likable. After seven auditions, Alyson Hannigan was eventually chosen for the role. She was chosen for being able to spin the character's lines with a self-effacing optimism; she stated, "I didn't want to do Willow as someone who's feeling sorry for herself. Especially in the first season, she couldn't talk to guys, and nobody liked her. I was like, 'I don't want to play somebody who's down on herself.'" Whedon conceived the character as introverted, saying, "I wanted Willow to have that kind of insanely colorful interior life that truly shy people have. And Alyson has that. She definitely has a loopiness I found creeping into the way Willow talked, which was great. To an extent, all the actors conform to the way I write the character, but it really stands out in Willow's case."

Nicholas Brendon, who had recently been fired from his job as a waiter and was struggling financially, was attracted to the pilot script for Buffy because of how much he had hated high school. Brendon recognized that Xander was based on Joss Whedon when he had attended high school, accounting for why Xander "gets all the good lines".

Charisma Carpenter had originally planned to read for the role of Buffy, but she was late for her audition and instead tried out for Cordelia. Although she had only fifteen minutes to prepare for the character, the producers were "really responsive" to Carpenter's audition, and she left feeling confident she had gotten the part. After Carpenter's audition, Gellar, who had been offered the role of Cordelia before Carpenter, was asked to come back and audition for the part of Buffy. Bianca Lawson originally won the role of Cordelia Chase, but turned it down due to other contractual obligations. Lawson would later be cast as vampire slayer Kendra in the show's second season. Cordelia was originally intended to serve as a dramatic foil to Buffy and to represent the characteristics of the less mature and shallower Buffy portrayed in the original film.

Julie Benz, who portrayed Darla, originally auditioned for the role of Buffy. However, Benz was later offered the minor role of Darla in the pilot episode. Although the character (originally an unnamed minor vampire) was supposed to die in the pilot, Whedon liked her performance so well that he named her, and her character appeared in several more episodes. Benz went on to portray Darla in several episodes of Buffy's spin-off television series, Angel. She later went on to say:

For me, I was a new actor to Los Angeles, didn't know the TV business very well, so I was just excited to work and play a vampire. I had no clue what I was going to do or how I was going to be scary. Until that is, they put the vampire makeup on me, and I went into the trailer and smiled, which I thought was creepy. Joss always said he was intrigued that someone who looked like me and talked like me was like the scariest vampire ever. That's what he wanted, my sweet voice and demeanor until all of a sudden I’m just this vicious vampire."

Veteran character actor Mark Metcalf appeared in heavy prosthetic make-up for the role of The Master, belying his iconic performance in the film National Lampoon's Animal House (1978) as Douglas C. Neidermeyer. In 2011, Metcalf recognized his role on Buffy as one of his favorites. Many actors auditioned for the part, but Whedon felt Metcalf played it with more complexity, bringing a "sly and kind of urbane" sensitivity and a charm to the villainy of the character. Kristine Sutherland was cast as Buffy's mother, Joyce. Sutherland, who disliked the horror genre, was not looking for acting jobs when her agent called her with the opportunity to play Joyce. Sutherland auditioned the same day as David Boreanaz and was impressed with how naturally she felt at ease with the material in the scripts. Bob Flutie, Sunnydale High School's principal, was originally played by Stephen Tobolowsky in the unaired pilot. Ken Lerner was cast as Flutie in the broadcast version.

Certain scenes, such as the argument between Giles and Buffy in the library and Buffy's first meeting with Angel, were re-shot eight months after the first episode was recorded, with both Whedon and Gellar feeling that Buffy was too angry in the original takes. Whedon subsequently teased Gellar that they were going to reshoot the scenes a third time. The high school used for external and some internal scenes in the series is Torrance High, the same school used for the series Beverly Hills, 90210.

=== Vampire effects ===
Joss Whedon created the idea of "vamp faces," which was to have vampires' human features distort to become more demonic. Whedon wanted normal high school students that the other characters could interact with normally, only to have them turn out to be vampires, therefore creating a sense of paranoia. He also wanted the vampires to be "clearly monsters," so it wouldn't seem like a high school girl was killing normal-looking people. The vampires originally appeared "very white-faced, very creepy, very ghoulish". This was toned down in later episodes as the makeup was too time-consuming. Whedon claims that people thought the white faces to be "funny looking" but personally found it creepier, comparing them to the monsters in zombie movies such as Day of the Dead and The Evil Dead. The character of the Master was designed to be in vamp face permanently to highlight his age and make him appear more animalistic; make-up artist John Vulich based the Master's appearance on a bat, reasoning that the character has devolved to a more primal, demonic state over the years. It was decided that vampires and their clothes would turn to dust after they died. This was done for practical storytelling reasons, so the characters would not have to spend time cleaning up bodies. This episode introduced the idea that vampires' clothes would resemble the era in which they died, with Buffy identifying one by his dated outfit. Joss Whedon felt this concept was a "charming notion" but ultimately rejected it for the most part because he believed that, if every vampire in the show was dressed in old-fashioned clothes, they would cease to be scary.

== Reception ==
"Welcome to the Hellmouth" first aired in the United States on March 10, 1997 on The WB. On the original airing of this episode, The WB provided a teaser advertisement briefing the history of past Slayers. It revealed horrific events in towns that were halted when a particular woman arrived. This promotional teaser does not appear in syndication or on DVD. "Welcome to the Hellmouth" earned a Nielsen rating of 3.4, meaning that roughly 3.4 percent of all television-equipped households were tuned in to the episode. It was the 100th most watched episode of television that aired during the week ending March 16.

The episode received largely positive reviews from critics. Vox ranked it at #111 of all 144 episodes on their "Every Episode Ranked From Worst to Best" list (to mark the 20th anniversary of the show), writing that it "has to lay the groundwork for Buffy's winding, convoluted mythology and introduce its main cast, and it more or less manages: It’s a little awkward here and there but mostly just fun. And the opening scene, with Darla playing a meek little schoolgirl before she turns on her prey, shows you exactly how funny and scary and subversive Buffy will turn out to be."

Noel Murray of The A.V. Club wrote that the episode was "a good introduction to the show, establishing the characters and the premise quickly and cleanly, before ending on a cliffhanger". Murray, however, did note that it contained a "dialogue that sounds more faux-clever than actually clever" and that there was "an overall flatness to the action/horror sequences" that would continue until the second season. John Levesque, writing for the Seattle Post-Intelligencer, called the fledgling series "witty, intelligent and thoroughly entertaining" and dubbed it "the best thing I've seen on The WB". He praised the acting of Sarah Michelle Gellar, noting that she "plays Buffy to perfection". Phil Kloer of The Atlanta Journal and the Atlanta Constitution called the show a "kicky little mix of camp comedy, high school hi-jinks and monsters" and likened its plot to the Fox sci-fi series The X-Files and the Nickelodeon horror-themed anthology series Are You Afraid of the Dark?. He ultimately gave the episode a B.

Rolling Stone ranked "Welcome to the Hellmouth" at #112 on their "Every Episode Ranked From Worst to Best" list, writing that the "opening with Darla in the deserted high school perfectly subverts expectations, and in doing so, sets the tone for the next seven seasons. First episodes often get bogged down in establishing lore, and while 'Welcome to the Hellmouth' is no exception, the snappy dialogue and the charm of our core protagonists mean it doesn’t really matter. It’s by no means the best episode, but it’s special for what it began."

"Welcome to the Hellmouth" was ranked at #51 on Paste Magazine's "Every Episode Ranked" list and #52 on BuzzFeed's "Ranking Every Episode" list.

Nikki Stafford, in her book Bite Me!, called the first episode "excellent" and complimented the strengths of the main cast as well as the show's unique approach. She contrasted it with the earlier movie, noting that "the movie version [...] was like Clueless, but near the end suddenly tried to be a serious film. The television show carries comedy, action, and drama simultaneously and features a far superior ensemble cast."

== Footnotes ==
=== References ===
- Billson, Anne (2005). Buffy the Vampire Slayer (BFI TV Classics). British Film Institute. ISBN 1-84457-089-4.
- Edwards, Lynne (2008). Buffy Goes Dark: Essays on the Final Two Seasons of Buffy the Vampire Slayer. McFarland. ISBN 978-0-7864-3676-7.
- Golden, Christopher; Holder, Nancy (1998). Watcher's Guide Vol. 1. Simon & Schuster. ISBN 1-932100-00-8.
- Havens, Candace (2003). Joss Whedon: The Genius Behind Buffy. Benbella Books. ISBN 1-932100-00-8.
- Stafford, Nikki (2007). Bite Me!: The 10th Buffyversary Guide to the World of Buffy the Vampire Slayer. ECW Press. ISBN 978-1-55022-807-6.
- Topping, Keith (2004). Slayer, the Next Generation: An Unofficial and Unauthorised Guide to Season Six of Buffy the Vampire Slayer. Virgin Publishing. ISBN 0-7535-0738-2.
- Wilcox, Rhonda; et al. (2002). Fighting the Forces: What's at Stake in Buffy the Vampire Slayer. Rowman & Littlefield Publishers. ISBN 0-7425-1681-4.
