= Jenny Calendar =

Character in Buffy the Vampire Slayer

Jennifer "Jenny" Calendar
- Buffy the Vampire Slayer character
- Robia LaMorte as Jenny Calendar
- First appearance: "I, Robot... You, Jane" (1997)
- Last appearance: "Amends" (1998)
- Created by: Joss Whedon, Ashley Gable, Thomas A. Swyden
- Portrayed by: Robia LaMorte

In-universe information
- Affiliation: Scooby Gang
- Classification: Human
- Notable powers: Knowledge of the Dark Arts. Computer programming expert.

Jenny Calendar is a fictional character in the fantasy television series Buffy the Vampire Slayer (1997–2003). Played by Robia LaMorte, Jenny is the computer teacher at Sunnydale High School. Unbeknownst to Buffy or anyone else, Jenny has been sent to Sunnydale to keep an eye on Angel.

In the first two seasons of the series, Jenny Calendar is Rupert Giles' primary romantic interest. She serves to counter his technophobia and is a rare adult female role model for the young women in Buffy's circle. During the second season her true identity is revealed: she is Janna of the Kalderash, a member of the Romani group that cursed Angel. In response to an elder's visions that Angel is suffering less due to his growing romance with Buffy, Jenny is instructed to impede their relationship. As a result of events during the second season storyline (specifically in Season 2, Episode 14, "Innocence") Angel loses his soul and reverts to Angelus, his evil alter ego, eventually making Jenny his victim. Among the main cast, she is the series' first recurring character to die, and the manner of her death is noted for its disturbing effect on audiences.

== Creation and casting ==
Buffy the Vampire Slayer was first created by Joss Whedon as a feature film in 1992. Unhappy with the film, Whedon later revived for television the concept of an adolescent girl who is given superhuman powers by mystical forces to defeat evil. The film only touches on the adult world surrounding Buffy Summers, while the series explores it in greater depth.

Originally trained as a dancer who toured and appeared in music videos with Prince, Robia LaMorte won the part of Jenny Calendar. LaMorte had appeared in contemporary television series such as Beverly Hills, 90210, but remarked specifically that she knew at once the material given to her to read in the audition for Buffy was different: "Sometimes you get scripts, and you just know. The words just fit in your mouth a different way when you know you're supposed to speak them. And I kind of knew I was going to get it." Anthony Head, who plays Giles on the series, had already been cast and was scheduled to read with LaMorte so the casting department could gauge their chemistry—which Head acknowledged, later saying, "She's gorgeous, like a David Bailey picture." LaMorte spent a few minutes before the audition speaking and joking with Head, assuming he was a producer. When it came time for them to enter the audition room together, she handed him the chewing gum from her mouth only to learn that he was the actor cast to play opposite her.

== Progression ==
=== Season 1 ===
Jenny Calendar's first appearance is in the episode "I Robot, You Jane", which deals with the risks of online romance. Willow Rosenberg (Alyson Hannigan), one of Buffy's friends, is spending time online with someone she knows as Malcolm, who turns out to be a demon named Moloch the Corrupter. The series regularly employs monsters and elements of dark fantasy to represent real-life problems. As a Watcher, Giles is extremely knowledgeable about the creatures that Buffy must face. He has a large collection of books detailing the demon realms, upon which he relies as the main tool of research and problem-solving. Jenny challenges his traditional approach and helps him to solve the problem of how to find and kill the demon when Giles reveals himself to be a technophobe; she both frustrates and flirts with him in the process. Jenny's character was not intended to be recurring, but the chemistry exhibited between LaMorte and Head encouraged the writers to make her a regular member of the cast.

Jenny's role as a recurring character was cemented in "Prophecy Girl", where she acknowledges that she is aware of the many evil forces in Sunnydale and indicates she is willing to join the Scoobies in their fight against them. Jenny frequently helps through her access to, and knowledge of, technology; she and the related role of Willow represent the marriage of science and magic on the series. Jenny refers to herself as a techno-pagan, not a witch. She says she does not have the necessary power to be a witch, but is adept at researching demons and other occult topics to assist Giles and Buffy. Jenny introduces viewers to the series' expression of magic. In contrast to the more clichéd portrayals of magic in the media as an evil force akin to Satan-worshiping tinged with sexploitation, magic in Buffy instead represents a more earth-bound force that can be harnessed for a physical price. Jenny tells Giles that email and bone-casting are equally valid forms of receiving information. The combination of technology and magic represent the joining of masculine and feminine fields, which Jenny Calendar embodies.

Furthermore, many of Jenny's qualities demonstrate a closer kinship with the adolescent characters than the adult ones. In the first season, the female adolescents—Buffy, Willow, and Cordelia (Charisma Carpenter)—establish their identities in contrast to older women, usually parents or teachers. Jenny's youthful style and her rejection of a staid way of life indicate that she is a role model for the young female characters. They do not see her as an adversarial adult.

=== Season 2 ===
The conflicts in the second season broaden to explore the difficulties faced by Buffy as she becomes torn between love and duty—a theme which is also reflected in Jenny's storyline. Jenny and Giles begin dating in the episode "Some Assembly Required", and his attempts to ask her out force him into facing issues far more frightening than the monsters and demons with which he is familiar, and bring her into direct conflict with her secret reason for being in Sunnydale. Their romance is at the center of "The Dark Age", where it is revealed that Giles' past includes a youthful exploration into dark magic, when he was known to his friends as "Ripper". The result of this experimentation 20 years ago calls a demon named "Eyghon" to Sunnydale; the demon temporarily possesses Jenny, prompting her to halt their relationship. At the end of the episode, she tells Giles she needs some time away from him. Although the make-up requirement for LaMorte's appearance as Eyghon nearly gave her an anxiety attack, she considered this the most fun episode she filmed. She was called upon to throw Giles across the room and slam his head onto a table.

Jenny and Giles tentatively reignite their relationship in "Ted". According to Lorna Jowett, Jenny Calendar—and later, Olivia (Phina Oruche)—serves to assure viewers that Giles, despite being a man who spends most of his time with adolescents, is heterosexual and has no sexual interest in the teenage characters. His relationship with Jenny also allows them to emphasize the generation gap between themselves and adults: they consider the idea of him as a sexual being "gross".

Author Tracy Little asserts that in addition to the theme of love vs. duty, "you are not who I thought you were" applies to the second season, and notably, centers around Jenny Calendar. In "Surprise" it is revealed that Jenny is an emissary from the tribe that cursed Angel. Her true name is Janna (pronounced Yannah), and she has been sent to ensure he continues to suffer for his past brutality. Janna's Uncle Enyos (Vincent Schiavelli) comes to remind her of her duty to her people and he expresses his disappointment that, as a woman from a group of people wary of technology and intermarriage with outsiders, she has become a computer teacher in a relationship with a non-Gypsy. Angel's ongoing torment allows the curse to continue working and must be maintained. An "Elder Woman," however, has had visions that Angel's pain is lessening and that this cannot be allowed to happen—Jenny must separate him from Buffy, as she is the cause of his relief. Enyos does not tell her a significant element of the curse: should Angel ever experience even one moment of true happiness, his soul will again disappear, making him "Angelus", the evil vampire he was. This factor comes into play when Buffy and Angel have sex in "Innocence" as in the intimacy of that experience he feels happiness deep enough to trigger the loss of his soul. Angelus becomes the second season's Big Bad and begins to terrorize Buffy and her inner circle by stalking and threatening them. Buffy subsequently figures out that Jenny is involved in Angel's transformation and confronts her. This revelation causes a deep rift between Jenny and the rest of the Scoobies and effectively halts her romance with Giles. Buffy demands that she curse Angel again, but Jenny does not know how to do this. Angelus' first act is to kill Enyos, thus revealing that Angel already knew Jenny's true identity and motives prior to losing his soul at some point. For most of the rest of the second season Jenny remains estranged from Buffy's circle; only Willow, who Jenny asks to teach her computer class for her, regularly interacts with her.

==== Death ====
By the episode "Passion" it has become clear that Angelus is targeting Buffy's friends and family and has, in Giles' words, "regained his sense of whimsy", demonstrated by petty cruelties that keep the group unsettled and frightened. In their first real conversation since estrangement, Giles warns Jenny to beware of the increasing danger to them all; during this conversation she admits to Giles that she has fallen in love with him and they agree to meet later. Despite the improbability of success and without telling Giles or Buffy, Jenny attempts to restore Angel's soul by using her computer to translate the ancient curse. Upon learning what she is doing, Angelus destroys the computer, taunts Jenny, then laughs as he chases her through the school, finally killing her by snapping her neck. He then takes Jenny's body to Giles' apartment and sets up music, champagne, and roses, as if she is awaiting him in his bedroom for a romantic encounter; Giles then finds her dead body arranged on his bed. To derive the maximum pleasure from what he has done, Angelus waits outside Buffy's house to watch their shock and distress as Buffy and Willow receive the call that Jenny has been murdered.

Steve Vineberg, a film and theater professor, asserts in a 2000 article in The New York Times that the character's death marked "the most terrifying and upsetting phase of the show". Similarly, author Kathleen Tracy states that "Passion" is, among the first two seasons' episodes, the most "viscerally disturbing" not only for Jenny's death and its brutality, but because the series killed off a regularly recurring and sympathetic character, something which was unprecedented in television history. Joss Whedon recognized this when he stated in an interview that killing Jenny, and the manner of her dispatching, was precisely devised to make several points. It was integral that the show make clear to the audience that "not everything is safe, that not every one is safe...to show that death is final and death is scary", and to signal that any character, at any time, could die. Jenny's death was also used to make clear that Angel, in his incarnation as Angelus, is truly evil and now Buffy's mortal enemy whom she must kill. After much discussion, Whedon and the writers decided that Angel should not bite Jenny, but instead break her neck as a show of his contempt for her: "I'm not even going to feed" is the attitude Whedon wanted to communicate, as well as Angel's evident pleasure in the act. Whedon also felt that it was important that Angel do so wearing his vampire face as they planned to bring the re-ensouled Angel back later, and it would be "too disturbing" to the audience to accept Buffy ever kissing him again had the murder been committed while in his normal visage. Whedon stated that the writing team wanted the prospect of bringing Angel back after the murder of Jenny Calendar to be very difficult and so fraught with consequences that even the characters would not be sure they wanted him to return.

== Influence ==
Following her death, Jenny Calendar's character continues to have an influence on the series. Among the female Scoobies, it is Willow who most looks up to Jenny. Willow is skilled with computers and her mother is emotionally distant from her; Willow expresses several times that her parents are mostly uninterested in her. As Jenny offers both mentoring and validation for Willow, she becomes a substitute mother for her. Jenny furthermore argues that traditionally, knowledge has been kept from people as a result of systemized patriarchy, and she champions computers and the Internet because she believes they will create a new society. Author J. P. Williams asserts that Jenny Calendar's feminist viewpoints resonate with Willow, as Willow receives similar commentary about patriarchy in the media on the rare occasions her mother speaks to her. Jenny is limited, however, by the very patriarchy she fights. Her first lessons from her people are about vengeance, and she is fully committed to her duty to watch Angel. Although she treats Giles as an equal and demands the same from him, her deference to her uncle stifles her. Enyos' withholding information from Jenny is echoed in Giles' frequent ignorance of facts the Watcher's Council deliberately withholds from him. Because Jenny is not told the full details of the curse, she is unable to warn Buffy and Angel, thus her ignorance essentially kills her. Williams writes, "Whether Buffy will eventually provide an alternative model of womanhood is perhaps the series' most intriguing cliffhanger."

In an analysis of the treatment of Romani people in literature and media, Nina Dobrev asserts that the show deserves to be criticized for associating Gypsies with curses and primitivism, for stereotyping Gypsies as "irrevocably foreign" in clothing and speech, and for perpetuating the persistent air of mystery surrounding them. Dobreva, however, praises the character of Jenny Calendar, writing in 2009: "Jenny’s character, despite the reversion to a few stereotypes, is arguably one of the most multi-faceted and positive representations of a female Gypsy in the past 20 years. In sharp contrast to all other Gypsy portrayals, she is technologically savvy, and, instead of resorting to incantations or obscure rituals, is able to create a computer algorithm that would make possible the restoration of Angel’s soul."

In the episode "Becoming", Willow finds the spell that Jenny translated and casts it herself, successfully restoring Angel's soul and leading to her own foray into magic. Willow attempts to learn more about magic in the fourth season by joining her college Wicca group, only to be met by women who are ineffectual, whom she labels "wanna-blessed-bes". She takes magic very seriously, becoming competent enough in the fifth season to achieve what Buffy cannot. By the seventh season, Willow's magical gifts are so powerful that she is the strongest person in Buffy's circle. Additionally, Jenny's comfort in expressing sexuality is a model for all the young women. Her "sexual (or sensual) aggression" is noted by Buffy studies writers. Williams asserts that Jenny's influence on Willow is evident when, in the fourth season, Willow falls in love with another woman, Tara Maclay (Amber Benson), expressing little self-doubt when she realizes she has.

Jenny appears twice more in the series, first in "Becoming", as part of an illusion the vampire Drusilla (Juliet Landau) creates to beguile Giles into telling Angelus, who is torturing him, what he needs to know. She again appears in the third-season episode "Amends" as the guise of the First Evil, who assumes the faces of many people Angel has killed, tormenting him and insisting he kill Buffy.

== Television appearances ==
Jenny Calendar appears in 14 Buffy episodes:

- Season 1 (1997): "I, Robot... You, Jane", "Prophecy Girl"
- Season 2 (1997–98): "When She Was Bad", "Some Assembly Required", "School Hard", "Lie to Me", "The Dark Age", "Ted", "Surprise", "Innocence", "Bewitched, Bothered and Bewildered", "Passion" (killed), "Becoming (Part 2)" (vision)
- Season 3 (1998): "Amends" (as the First Evil)

== Bibliography ==
- Dobreva, Nikolina (2009). The Case of the Traveling Dancer: Romani Representation from the 19th Century European Literature to Hollywood Film and Beyond, University of Massachusetts (Ph.D. dissertation)
- Golden, Christopher; Holder, Nancy (1998). Buffy the Vampire Slayer: The Watcher's Guide, Volume 1, Pocket Books. ISBN 0-671-02433-7
- Holder, Nancy; Mariotte, Jeff; Hart, Maryelizabeth (2000). Buffy the Vampire Slayer: The Watcher's Guide, Volume 2, Pocket Books. ISBN 0-671-04260-2
- Jowett, Lorna (2005). Sex and the Slayer: A Gender Studies Primer for the Buffy Fan, Wesleyan University Press. ISBN 978-0-8195-6758-1
- Kaveney, Roz (ed.) (2004). Reading the Vampire Slayer: The New, Updated, Unofficial Guide to Buffy and Angel, Tauris Parke Paperbacks. ISBN 1-86064-984-X
- South, James (ed.) (2003). Buffy the Vampire Slayer and Philosophy: Fear and Trembling in Sunnydale, Open Court Books. ISBN 0-8126-9531-3
- Stafford, Nikki (2007). Bite Me! The Unofficial Guide to Buffy the Vampire Slayer, ECW Press. ISBN 978-1-55022-807-6
- Tracy, Kathleen (1998). The Girl's Got Bite: The Unofficial Guide to Buffy's World, Renaissance Books. ISBN 1-58063-035-9
- Wilcox, Rhonda (2005). Why Buffy Matters: The Art of Buffy the Vampire Slayer, I. B. Tauris. ISBN 1-84511-029-3
- Wilcox, Rhonda and Lavery, David (eds.) (2002). Fighting the Forces: What's at Stake in Buffy the Vampire Slayer, Rowman and Littlefield Publishers. ISBN 0-7425-1681-4
