= Bruce Seth Green =

American television director (1941–2025)

- Born: September 18, 1941; Rockaway Beach, New York, U.S.
- Died: January 25, 2025 (aged 83); Santa Monica, California, U.S.
- Occupation: Television director
- Years active: 1970–2001

Bruce Seth Green (September 8, 1941 – January 25, 2025) was an American television director.

Green's credits included Knight Rider, Hercules: The Legendary Journeys, 1st & 10, Babylon 5, Buffy the Vampire Slayer, Angel, Dawson’s Creek, Gilmore Girls, Law & Order, Diagnosis Murder, Baywatch, and Highlander.

His last directorial credit was an episode of Roswell in 2001.

Green was not related to Buffy actor Seth Green; the two worked together on Buffy episodes "Halloween" (1997) and "Phases" (1998), as well as the Angel episode "In the Dark" (1999).

Green died at home in Santa Monica, California, on January 25, 2025, at the age of 83.
