= Anointed One (Buffy the Vampire Slayer) =

The Anointed One
- Buffy the Vampire Slayer character
- Andrew J. Ferchland as "The Anointed One"
- First appearance: "Never Kill a Boy on the First Date" (1997)
- Last appearance: "School Hard" (1997)
- Created by: Joss Whedon
- Portrayed by: Andrew J. Ferchland

In-universe information
- Affiliation: Order of Aurelius
- Classification: Vampire
- Notable powers: Supernatural strength, speed, stamina, agility, and reflexes Acute sensory perception, rapid healing, and immortality

The Anointed One is a fictional character in the television series Buffy the Vampire Slayer. The character is played by Andrew J. Ferchland. His epithet could refer to his position as the "messiah" (another word meaning anointed) of the vampire The Master.

== Character background ==
When the character of the Anointed One was first introduced in season 1 of Buffy the Vampire Slayer, he was expected to become the main antagonist of season 2. He is a ruthless vampire with the body of a child. An ancient prophecy foretells that he will rise from the ashes and lead the Slayer into Hell. His destiny is to serve as the right-hand man of The Master during Armageddon.

According to series creator Joss Whedon, the Anointed One is "very annoying". Whedon said that his original plans to feature the Anointed One as the main Big Bad of season 2 were changed because actor Andrew J. Ferchland was growing too quickly and would not be believable as a perpetual child for very long.

== Storylines ==
Introduced in season 1 to help The Master escape his confinement, he is killed by Spike in the season 2 episode "School Hard".

A prophecy foretold the coming of the Anointed One:

"And there will be a time of crisis, of worlds hanging in the balance. And in this time shall come the Anointed, The Master's great warrior... The Five will die, and from their ashes the Anointed shall rise. The Brethren of Aurelius shall meet him and usher him to his immortal destiny. ...the Slayer will not know him, will not stop him, and he will lead her into Hell."

In the episode "Never Kill a Boy on the First Date" a bus passing through Sunnydale was attacked by a group of The Master's vampires. The driver and four passengers were killed, and two of them were made vampires. One of these, a little boy named Collin, became the Anointed, a bloodthirsty companion to The Master. (Buffy killed the other new vampire, psychotic Andrew Borba, and mistakenly assumed that he was the Anointed One.)

As foretold by Aurelius, the Anointed One later led Buffy to the lair of The Master. Though it wasn't the literal Hell, it was underground, as the Christian Hell is said to be. Buffy would be defeated and killed by The Master there. (The prophecy was silent concerning the Slayer's resurrection at the hands of a friend — Xander Harris.) Buffy states that she recognized the Anointed One for what he was as Giles and Ms. Calendar realized he was a child, defying the prophecy (although it is possible the prophecy referred to Buffy mistaking Borba for the Anointed One).

Following The Master's demise at Buffy's hands, the Anointed One rallied the remaining members of the Order of Aurelius under his command, employing the vampire Absalom as his leading acolyte. The Anointed One and his lackeys attempted to resurrect the Master via a magic ritual, but were foiled when Buffy destroyed The Master's bones with a sledgehammer. Weeks later, he was killed by a newcomer to Sunnydale, Spike. Spike placed him in a cage and hoisted it into the sunlight, incinerating the Anointed One as he declared, "From now on, we're gonna have a little less ritual, and a little more fun around here!"

== See also ==
- List of Buffyverse villains and supernatural beings
