= Mark Metcalf =

American actor (born 1946)

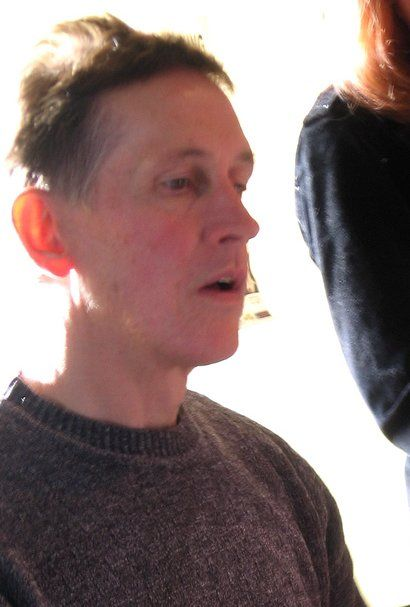
- Metcalf in 2005
- Born: March 11, 1946 (age 80); Findlay, Ohio, U.S.
- Education: University of Michigan
- Occupation: Actor
- Years active: 1971–present
- Spouse: Elizabeth Wick (divorced)
- Children: 1

Mark Metcalf (born March 11, 1946) is an American television and film actor often playing the role of an antagonistic and aggrieved authority figure.

He is best known for his role as sadistic ROTC officer Douglas C. Neidermeyer in the 1978 American comedy film Animal House, a character he later emulated in the 1984 music videos for the songs "We're Not Gonna Take It" and "I Wanna Rock" by the heavy metal band Twisted Sister.

He is also known for playing the role of The Maestro on two episodes of the sitcom Seinfeld as well as for his recurring role as The Master on the supernatural drama series Buffy the Vampire Slayer and its spin-off series Angel.

== Early life ==
Metcalf was born in Findlay, Ohio. His father Charles Mayo Metcalf was a civil engineer. Metcalf was raised in Webster Groves, a suburb of St. Louis. In 1959, he moved with his family to New Jersey where he attended Westfield High School, graduating in 1964.

Metcalf enrolled in the engineering program at the University of Michigan. It was at university that he performed in his first stage play, which was a production of Shakespeare's Henry VI. His first professional acting job was with the Milwaukee Repertory Theater in 1971. In the early 1970s, he moved to New York City performing in both classical and modern theater, eventually moving westward to work in film.

== Career ==
Metcalf's first major Hollywood film role was that of ROTC cadet officer Douglas Neidermeyer in the 1978 comedy Animal House. In 1984, Metcalf played characters similar to Neidermeyer in the Twisted Sister music videos for the songs "We're Not Gonna Take It", where he played an authoritarian father, and "I Wanna Rock", where he played an authoritarian high school teacher.

In the 1980s and 1990s, Metcalf landed guest roles on multiple television shows including Miami Vice, Walker, Texas Ranger and Party of Five. He also played recurring roles on shows such as Hill Street Blues, Teen Angel, Star Trek: Voyager, Ally McBeal and JAG. In 1993 he moved to Hollywood.

One of Metcalf's more memorable television characters was his role in an episode during the seventh season of Seinfeld titled "The Maestro". In the episode he played a self-absorbed conductor who was dating character Elaine Benes (Julia Louis-Dreyfus) and who insisted on being referred to as "Maestro". Metcalf reprised the role in an episode later that same season titled "The Doll".

From 1997 to 2002, Metcalf played the vampire known as The Master on several episodes of the series Buffy the Vampire Slayer and its spin-off series Angel.

In 2000, Metcalf left Los Angeles and moved to Bayside, Wisconsin with his then wife, Elizabeth "Libby" Wick and their son, Julius. Metcalf had moved to Wisconsin to start a restaurant with his wife and with no intent on continuing with acting, due to raising a child with special needs. However, Metcalf was approached by the director of First Stage Children's Theater in Milwaukee to act in one of their plays and Metcalf went on to act in several of their productions.

In conjunction with the Milwaukee Film Festival, Metcalf produced a short film each year based on a screenplay written by a high school student enrolled in the Student Screenwriting Competition, a program developed by Metcalf to teach the craft of screenwriting to young people. Metcalf also contributed articles about film as a correspondent for the online magazine OnMilwaukee.

In 2009, Metcalf played the role of Mayor Johnson on an episode of the third season of Mad Men titled "Souvenir".

After moving to Missoula, Montana in 2013, Metcalf once again became involved in local theatre, playing the role of Scrooge in a production of Charles Dickens' A Christmas Carol presented by the University of Montana School of Theatre and Dance.

In 2019, Metcalf played the role of Sheriff Roy in Tate Bunker's film The Field alongside Barry Bostwick and Veronica Cartwright. Metcalf was the subject of Vera Brunner-Sung's documentary short Character that premiered at the Sundance Film Festival in 2020. Metcalf met Brunner-Sung through a mutual friend after moving to Columbus, Ohio.

== Personal life ==
Metcalf has one son Julius with Elizabeth "Libby" Wick. The couple moved from Los Angeles, California to Bayside, Wisconsin in 2000. They owned and operated a restaurant in nearby Mequon, Wisconsin called Libby Montana. Metcalf filed for divorce in 2003; starting in 2006, Wick was the sole owner of the restaurant. In late 2024, the restaurant closed permanently.

In 2013, Metcalf moved to Missoula, Montana, to be closer to Julius, who was a student at the University of Montana.

Metcalf is a longtime advocate for Alzheimer’s research and awareness raising.

== Filmography ==
=== Film ===
Year	Title	Role	Notes
1977	Julia	Pratt	
1978	Animal House	Doug Neidermeyer	
1979	Chilly Scenes of Winter	Ox	
1980	Where the Buffalo Roam	Dooley	
1983	The Final Terror	Mike	
1984	Almost You	Andrews	
1985	The Heavenly Kid	Joe Barnes	
1986	One Crazy Summer	Aguilla Beckersted	
1988	Mr. North	Mr. Skeel	
1989	The Oasis	Eric	
1991	Oscar	Milhous	
1992	I'm Your Man	Richard Hewett	Interactive film
1995	A Reason to Believe	Dean Kirby	
1995	Rage	Lt. Gov. Dalquist	
1996	The Stupids	Colonel Neidermeyer	
1997	Hijacking Hollywood	Michael Lawrence	
1997	Loose Women	Director Marsh	
1999	Drive Me Crazy	Mr. Rope	
2000	The Million Dollar Kid	Officer Bob	
2002	Britney, Baby, One More Time	Barfly	
2002	Sorority Boys	John Kloss	
2002	Lone Hero	Marshall Harris	
2006	The Legend Trip	Charles Knotting	
2007	The Sleeper	Richmond	
2009	Modus Operandi	Copper Gore	
2011	Fort McCoy	Mr. Gerkey	
2011	We Will Rock You	Major Emile Hickory	
2012	Playback	Chris Safford	
2012	Little Red	Lou	
2012	The Smart Ones	Professor Faron	
2013	Billy Club	The Umpire	
2014	Hamlet A.D.D.	Speedy McSpitty	
2017	Manlife	Alfred Lawson	Voice
2018	A Futile and Stupid Gesture	Second Publisher	
2019	The Field	Sheriff Roy	

=== Television ===
Year	Title	Role	Notes
1975	Karen	Jess Walker	Episode: "I Gave at the Office"
1978	Julie Farr, M.D.	Buddy	Episode: "Careers"
1979	Barnaby Jones	Ted Parker	2 episodes
1981	Breaking Away	The Racer	Episode: "La Strada"
1981	Hill Street Blues	Officer Harris	4 episodes
1982	Teachers Only	David	Episode: "Diana, Substitute Mother"
1983	For Love and Honor	Major Camden	Episode: "Rite of Passage"
1983	Hotel	Chuck	Episode: "Confrontations"
1986	One Life to Live	Stick	3 episodes
1988	Miami Vice	Agent Brody	Episode: "Baseballs of Death"
1989	A Man Called Hawk	Mr. Kirkpatrick	Episode: "The Divided Child"
1991	L.A. Law	Greg Morrison	Episode: "As God Is My Co-Defendant"
1991	Dream On	The Creature	Episode: "The Second Greatest Story Ever Told"
1991	Guilty Until Proven Innocent	Ron D'Angelo	Television film
1991	A Woman Named Jackie	George Smathers	2 episodes
1992	Dead Ahead: The Exxon Valdez Disaster	Dennis Kelso	Television film
1993	Renegade	Russell	Episode: "The Champ"
1994	Silk Stalkings	Scott Finn	Episode: "The Last Campaign"
1994	Walker, Texas Ranger	Norval Hayes	Episode: "Deadly Vision"
1994	Dead at 21	Sheriff Sullivan	Episode: "Love Minus Zero"
1994	Touched by an Angel	Nick Morrow	Episode: "The Southbound Bus"
1995	Melrose Place	Det. Bob Wilkens	2 episodes
1995, 1996	Seinfeld	Bob Cobb	2 episodes
1996	Party of Five	Mr. Reeves	Episode: "Unfair Advantage"
1997–1998	Teen Angel	Roderick Nitzke	7 episodes
1997, 1998	Ally McBeal	Attorney Walden	2 episodes
1997–2002	Buffy the Vampire Slayer	The Master	8 episodes
1998	Star Trek: Voyager	Hirogen Medic	2 episodes
1999	JAG	Captain Pike	3 episodes
2000	Angel	The Master	Episode: "Darla"
2001	Warden of Red Rock	Carl McVale	Television film
2006	Video on Trial	Abusive Father	Episode #2.6
2009	Mad Men	Mayor Johnson	Episode: "Souvenir"
