= Robia LaMorte =

American actress and dancer (born 1970)

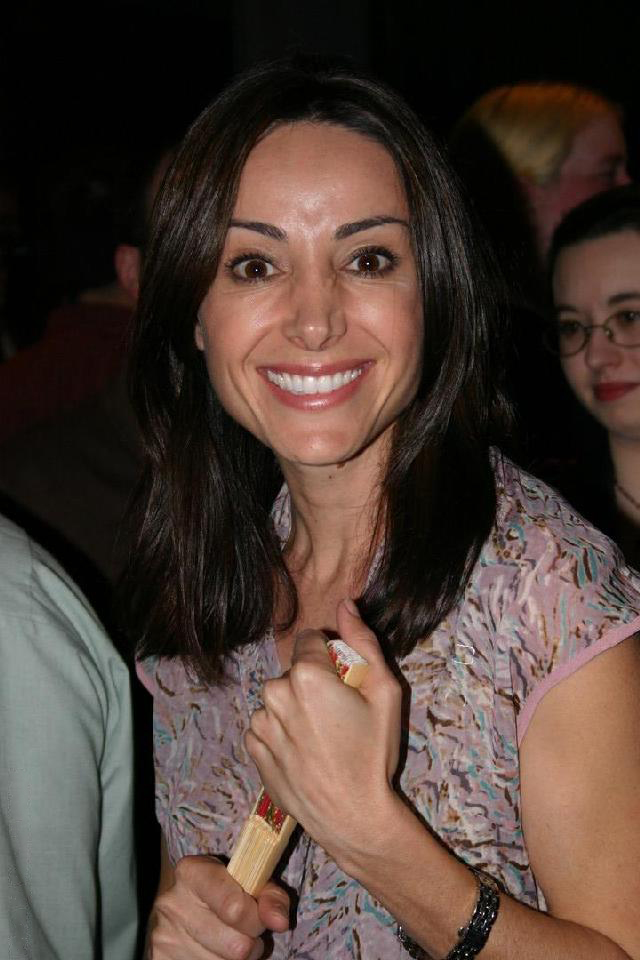
- LaMorte in 2005
- Born: Robia Brett LaMorte; July 7, 1970 (age 56); Queens, New York City, New York, U.S.
- Occupations: Actress; dancer
- Years active: 1988–2005, 2018–present
- Children: 1
- Website: robiascott.com

Robia LaMorte Scott (born 1970) is an American actress and former dancer who initially retired after converting to Christianity, becoming a counsellor and preacher. She may be best known as a dancer and spokesperson for musician Prince, or for appearing as Jenny Calendar in 14 episodes of the television series Buffy the Vampire Slayer.

== Early life ==
Scott was born in the New York City borough of Queens in 1970 and grew up in several locations including the Florida Keys and Ocean City, Maryland. She is named after her father, Robert LaMorte. After being inspired by the 1983 movie Flashdance, she began dancing and taking after-school lessons in jazz dance, ballet, and tap dance. She attended the Los Angeles County High School for the Arts as a dance major during the school's first year of operation, and then received a full scholarship to the Dupree Dance Academy in Hollywood. At sixteen, she began working as a backup dancer in music videos, first appearing in Debbie Gibson's "Shake Your Love".

== Career ==
After having appeared in more than thirty music videos and toured in a six-dancer troupe with the Pet Shop Boys, LaMorte was picked by Prince to be one of two lead dancers for the music video for "Cream", a single from his 1991 album Diamonds and Pearls. Prince had originally sought identical twins, but chose LaMorte along with another dancer, Lori Elle, because of their similar appearance and the dance chemistry they had with him. Elle as "Diamond" and LaMorte as "Pearl" subsequently appeared in the videos for "Cream", "Gett Off", "Strollin'", and the album's title track, as well as on the album's holographic cover itself. LaMorte and Elle then toured Europe with Prince, and when he temporarily refused to do any public speaking, the two women served as his spokespersons and conducted the main promotional efforts for Diamonds and Pearls. Elle would later go on tour with Ricky Martin and Michael Jackson.

At the age of 22, LaMorte retired from dance and turned to acting. After doing numerous television commercials, she landed the role of Jason Priestley's girlfriend Jill Fleming on Beverly Hills, 90210 in two episodes and played the female lead (alongside Andrew Bowen) in the live action video game Fox Hunt. Her first regular role was as high school teacher and technopagan Jenny Calendar on the first two seasons of Buffy the Vampire Slayer. After her character was killed during the second season, she returned for two more episodes as a ghost. In the second season finale "Becoming, Part Two" she makes a brief appearance as a hypnosis induced suggestion by Drusilla to trick Rupert Giles into revealing the flaw in Angel's plan. Finally, she returned during the third season episode "Amends" to play a false apparition of the dead Calendar, a guise assumed by the evil force known as "the First Evil".

After her role ended on Buffy, LaMorte periodically accepted guest starring roles on various television shows, before retiring from acting to focus her efforts on Christian counseling, although she was occasionally seen in commercials and smaller roles. She also spends some of her time preaching Christianity and selling audio CDs on her website that give accounts of her religious conversion and beliefs. In an FAQ on that site, LaMorte writes that while she was once a proponent of New Age beliefs, she rejected them after her conversion to Christianity. She criticizes these beliefs as a form of "earth worship" and characterizes the practice of witchcraft as a dangerous opening for demonic influence. She later returned to acting, appearing in the Christian anti-abortion film Unplanned.

== Personal life ==
As of 2020, LaMorte is married under the last name Scott, and has one daughter. She remains a committed Christian.

== Filmography ==
Film
| Year | Film | Role | Other notes |
|---|---|---|---|
| 1988 | Earth Girls Are Easy | 'I'm a Blond' Dancer | Uncredited role |
| 1994 | The Pros & Cons of Breathing | Mona | |
| 1996 | Fox Hunt | Lisa Gilroy | Live action video game |
| 1997 | Spawn | XXN Reporter | |
| 1998 | Deidre's Party | Robia | |
| 1999 | Chicks, Man | Kelly | |
| 1999 | 12 Stops on the Road to Nowhere | Jenny | |
| 2000 | Looking for Lois | Fran | Short film |
| 2002 | Robot Bastard! | Catherine | |
| 2005 | Pomegranate | Natalie | |
| 2019 | Unplanned | Cheryl | Credited as Robia Scott |
| 2022 | Pursuit of Freedom | Anoush | Credited as Robia Scott |
Television
| Year | Title | Role | Notes |
| 1991 | Blood Ties | Female Shrike | FOX TV movie |
| 1993 | Beverly Hills, 90210 | Jill Fleming | Episode: So Long, Farewell, Auf Wiedersehen, Goodbye; Episode: The Girl from New York City |
| 1995, 1998 | Silk Stalkings | Denise; Veronique Collins | Episode: Brother's Keeper; Episode: Do You Believe in Magic? |
| 1997 | Lawless | Actress | Episode: Pilot (uncredited) |
| 1997 | The Sentinel | Erika Lazar | Episode: The Inside Man |
| 1997–1998 | Buffy the Vampire Slayer | Jenny Calendar/The First Evil | 14 episodes |
| 1999 | The Pretender | Cindy Wells | Episode: Countdown |
| 1999 | Rescue 77 | Megan Cates | 5 episodes |
| 1999 | Time of Your Life | Angela | Episode: The Time the Millennium Approached |
| 2000 | 18 Wheels of Justice | Maureen Cummings | Episode: Con Truck |
| 2001 | CSI: Crime Scene Investigation | Joan Marks | Episode: You've Got Male |
| 2021–2023 | Vindication | Amanda Scott | 5 episodes |
