= Larry Gross =

Screenwriter, director

- Born: 1953 (age 72–73); United States
- Occupations: Screenwriter, producer, academic

Larry Gross (born 1953) is an American screenwriter, and producer. He is a visiting professor of film and new media at New York University Abu Dhabi. Best known for his collaborations with Walter Hill, his credits include 48 Hrs. (1982), Streets of Fire (1984), and uncredited contributions to Ralph Bakshi's Cool World (1992). He won the 2004 Waldo Salt Screenwriting Award at the Sundance Film Festival for We Don't Live Here Anymore (2004). His criticism has appeared in Film Comment and Sight & Sound.

Gross attended St Edmund Hall, Oxford and Bard College, from which he graduated in 1974. He later completed an MA in English at Columbia University (where he subsequently served as an adjunct assistant professor of film) and an MA in film studies at New York University.

In 2008, Gross published his contemporaneous diary of his days on the set of 48 Hrs. on MovieCityNews.

== Filmography ==
=== Filmography ===
- Headin' for Broadway (with Joseph Brooks) (1980)
- 48 Hrs. (with Steven E. de Souza, Roger Spottiswoode and Walter Hill) (1982)
- Streets of Fire (with Walter Hill) (1984)
- 3:15 (1986) (director only)
- Another 48 Hrs. (with John Fasano and Jeb Stuart) (1990)
- Geronimo: An American Legend (with John Milius) (1993)
- This World, Then the Fireworks (1997)
- Chinese Box (with Jean-Claude Carrière, Paul Theroux and Wayne Wang) (1997)
- Gunshy (1998)
- True Crime (with Paul Brickman and Stephen Schiff) (1999)
- Crime and Punishment in Suburbia (2000)
- The Virginian (2000)
- Prozac Nation (with Galt Niederhoffer, and Frank Deasy) (2001)
- We Don't Live Here Anymore (2004)
- Say It in Russian (with Jeff Celentano, Kenneth Eade and Agata Gotova) (2007)
- Veronika Decides to Die (with Roberta Hanley) (2009)
- Porto (with Gabe Klinger) (2016)

=== TV Credits ===
- The New Mike Hammer (1984)
- MacGyver (1986)
- The Loner (1988)
- Midnight Caller (1989)
- David (1997)
- Rear Window (1998)
