= An Involuntary Spy =

2013 novel by Kenneth G. Eade

- First edition
- Author: Kenneth Eade
- Language: English
- Genre: Political thriller
- Publisher: Times Square Publishing
- Publication date: 2013
- Publication place: United States
- Media type: Print (Ebook, Paperback)
- Pages: 350 pp
- ISBN: 978-1-492-90977-4

An Involuntary Spy is a 2013 political suspense thriller by Kenneth G. Eade. It was Eade's first novel. The novel is a fictional spy thriller that critics have said has broken wide open the GMO controversy. The story follows a rogue scientist working for an American biotech firm who goes on the run from authorities after stealing information from his employer which proves government collusion and a cover-up of fraud surrounding the dangers of the company's genetically engineered foods. In 2014, the novel was nominated for a RONE Award by InD'Tale Magazine and won an Honorable Mention for its cover. It is also used as reference material for the Environmental Ethics, Value and Justice course at Columbia University. The novel been credited with shining the light on the "revolving door" between private industry and government regulatory agencies. The novel is critically acclaimed. Midwest Book Review said, "Any who want a more realistic, modern-day James Bond complete with contemporary ethical concerns will find themselves held hostage to the fast action and intrigue in An Involuntary Spy, right up to a satisfyingly-unpredictable conclusion made all the more powerful for its real basis in today's uncertain experiments compliments of Monsanto, Dow, and other genetic manipulators." San Francisco Book Review said, "An Involuntary Spy is absolutely riveting, suspenseful, and an eye-opener to the controversial effects of genetically engineered food."

== Setting ==
The story takes place in St. Louis, Missouri, the headquarters of character, Seth Rogan's employer, and the Far East of Russia in the present day.

== Inspiration ==
Eade was inspired to write a fictional story which also exposes the dangers of genetically modified foods. To accomplish that, he created the character of Seth Rogan, a genetic biologist, who worked on genetically engineered foods for Germinat Corporation, the largest biotech company in the world.

== Plot summary ==
The novel is the story of Seth Rogan, a biologist for Germinat, the fictional biotech company, which, in the novel, is the largest one in the world. Rogan was comfortable in his job until, while working on a project for the company's genetically engineered (GMO) foods, he uncovered secret reports that had been hidden from the public by the company and the government. He is charged with espionage, and flees to Russia, which he determines is the only safe place from where he can tell his story.
