= The Loner (film) =

- Genre: Action; Crime; Buddy cop
- Written by: Larry Gross
- Directed by: Abel Ferrara
- Starring: John Terry; Vanessa Bell Calloway; Constance Towers
- Country of origin: United States
- Original language: English

Production
- Executive producers: Aaron Spelling; E. Duke Vincent
- Producer: Larry Gross
- Cinematography: Anthony B. Richmond
- Editor: Anthony Redman
- Production company: Aaron Spelling Productions

Original release
- Network: ABC
- Release: August 18, 1988

The Loner is a 1988 American action television film directed by Abel Ferrara and executive produced by Aaron Spelling. It stars John Terry, Vanessa Bell Calloway, and Constance Towers. It was intended as a pilot for a potential television series, but was not picked up.

== Plot ==
Two cops try to solve a $750,000 jewel theft.

== Cast ==
- John Terry as Michael Shane
- Vanessa Bell Calloway as Carver
- Constance Towers as Kate Shane
- Rick Logan as Manny Sanchez
- Monty Bane as Boomer
- Bill Quinn as Lipstadt, Sr.
- Clare Kirkconnell as Jessica Grenville
- Larry Hankin as Abner Gibson
- Kristy Swanson as Sherry Spicer
- Michael Medeiros as Kyle Hadley
- Claude Brooks as Cole Newton
- William Russ as Jake Willis
