= Under the Hula Moon =

- Film poster
- Directed by: Jeff Celentano
- Written by: Jeff Celentano; Gregory Webb
- Produced by: Stacy Codikow
- Starring: Stephen Baldwin; Emily Lloyd; Chris Penn; Musetta Vander
- Cinematography: Phil Parmet
- Edited by: Donald Likovich
- Music by: Hidden Faces
- Production company: Periscope Pictures
- Release date: December 1, 1995
- Running time: 94 minutes
- Country: United States
- Language: English

Under the Hula Moon is a 1995 American crime comedy film directed by Jeff Celentano and starring Stephen Baldwin, Emily Lloyd, Chris Penn, and Musetta Vander.

== Plot ==
Buzzard "Buzz" Wall and his wife Betty are an eccentric young couple living in a trailer in the desert outside Cactus Gulch, Arizona. Buzz dreams of becoming rich off his new invention, a green 150 SPF sunscreen called Cammo, and moving to Hawaii, while Betty dreams of winning the lottery and starting a family. Buzz is unable to get funding for his product, but in his moment of despair, he sees a vision of the ghost of King Kamehameha, who tells him he will soon embark on a perilous journey that will reveal his destiny.

Elsewhere in the desert, Buzz's half-brother, Turkey "Turk" Dickson, has escaped prison. He kills a man for his van and makes it to Cactus Gulch, where he finds Buzz and Betty's trailer. It quickly becomes apparent that Turk is completely deranged, and he threatens the couple for money. When Buzz reveals they only have $65, Turk gags and binds his brother and attempts to rape Betty. However, he is interrupted by a knock at the door for Betty, who has won a prize of $10,000 from a magazine. Turk poses as Buzz in order to accept the check, and then kidnaps Betty, leaving Buzz bound and bleeding in the trailer.

Across town, Buzz's ex-girlfriend Maya Gundinger bemoans her job as a news reporter in a small town, dreaming of covering more important stories. She sees the broadcast of Betty's win on TV, realizes that the man is not Buzz, and finds Buzz in his trailer. Once Maya frees him, the two hit the road to rescue Betty. Maya insists on filming everything, which aggravates Buzz.

Along the way, Buzz proves himself to be brave and able to overcome temptation, guided by the spirit of Kamehameha.

Turk ditches his car at the Mexican border and he and Betty walk through the desert until they reach a saloon, where Buzz and Maya find them. Buzz convinces a gang of thugs to confront Turk for him, but eventually runs in to fight Turk himself. Buzz nearly chokes Turk to death, but the spirit of Kamehameha disapproves of this, and Buzz lets go. The floor then caves in and the two fall into a secret underground DEA base, where Turk is arrested.

Buzz and Betty return home, where they both find jobs as burger flippers. Thanks to Maya's coverage, the Turk case becomes headlining news for weeks on end. The couple is then visited by the United States Marine Corps, who are interested in buying Buzz's Cammo sunscreen. Sales of Cammo are so successful that the couple are able to move to Hawaii. In the final shot, Buzz and Betty are seen sailing into the sunset on an outrigger canoe with their new son, Buzz Jr.

== Cast ==
- Stephen Baldwin as Buzz Wall
- Emily Lloyd as Betty Wall
- Chris Penn as Turk Dickson
- Musetta Vander as Maya Gundinger
- Pruitt Taylor Vince as Bob
- Edie McClurg as Dolly
- Robert Madrid as Juan
- Carel Struycken as Clyde
- Ray Bumatai as King
- Debra Christofferson as Kim Jones
- Billy Campbell as Marvin (as Bill Campbell)
- Molly McClure as Grandmother
- Deep Roy as Bus Driver
- Bobby McGee as Leon
- Willard E. Pugh as Duane
- Gary Carlos Cervantes as Bandito (as Gary Cervantes)
- Luis Contreras as Bandito
- Patrick Dollaghen as Agent Kepner
- R. Lee Ermey as Lt. Col. J.P. McIntire
- Jeff Celentano as Chuck (uncredited)
