= Girlfriends (2006 film) =

2006 French-Belgian comedy film

- Film poster
- Directed by: Sylvie Ayme
- Written by: Sylvie Ayme; Joanne Giger
- Produced by: Christophe Cervoni; Eric Juhérian; Mathias Rubin
- Starring: Stéphanie Sokolinski; Djena Tsimba; Léa Seydoux; Anne-Sophie Franck
- Cinematography: Yves Dahan
- Edited by: Sophie Reine
- Production companies: Récifilms; Axel Films; Scope Pictures
- Distributed by: Pathé
- Release date: 21 June 2006
- Running time: 90 minutes
- Countries: France; Belgium
- Language: French
- Budget: $4.5 million
- Box office: $632,821

Girlfriends (French title: Mes copines) is a 2006 Franco-Belgian comedy film directed by Sylvie Ayme and starring Stéphanie Sokolinski, Djena Tsimba, Léa Seydoux, and Anne-Sophie Franck.

== Synopsis ==
Manon, Djena, Aurore, and Marie are four high school friends who dream of winning the Défi dance, an inter-school hip hop competition.

== Cast ==
- Soko as Manon
- Djena Tsimba as Djena
- Léa Seydoux as Aurore
- Anne-Sophie Franck as Marie
- Xavier Hosten as Cédric
- Nicolas Jouxtel as Manon's little brother
- Patrick Braoudé as Doisneau
- Rossy de Palma as Marie's mother
- Serge Riaboukine as Manon's father
- Thierry René as Djena's father
- Jean-Michel Noirey as Marie's father
- Sophie Frison as Leslie
- Véronique Biefnot as Aurore's mother
- Jean-Yves Berteloot as Aurore's father
- Thomas Ancora as Éric
- Philippe du Janerand as a server
- Nicolas Gob as Pierre
- Sara Martins as Shaheen
- Caroline Veyt as Juliette
- Julien Béramis as Navin
- Soufiane Guerrab as Alexandre
