= Porto (film) =

- Theatrical release poster
- Directed by: Gabe Klinger
- Written by: Larry Gross; Gabe Klinger
- Produced by: Rodrigo Areias; Sonia Buchman; Nicolas De La Mothe; Gabe Klinger; Todd Remis; Julie Snyder
- Starring: Anton Yelchin; Lucie Lucas; Paulo Calatré; João Monteiro Oliveira; Françoise Lebrun
- Cinematography: Wyatt Garfield
- Edited by: Gabe Klinger; Géraldine Mangenot
- Production companies: Double Play Films; Bando à Parte; Gladys Glover; Salem Street Entertainment
- Distributed by: Kino Lorber (United States)
- Release dates: September 19, 2016 (SSIFF); November 17, 2017 (United States)
- Running time: 76 minutes
- Countries: France; Poland; Portugal; United States
- Languages: English; Portuguese; French
- Box office: $15,126

Porto is a 2016 American drama film directed by Gabe Klinger and written by Larry Gross and Gabe Klinger. The film stars Anton Yelchin (in one of his posthumous on-screen appearances), Lucie Lucas, Paulo Calatré, João Monteiro Oliveira and Françoise Lebrun. Executive producer was Jim Jarmusch. The film was released on November 17, 2017, by Kino Lorber.

== Cast ==
- Anton Yelchin as Jake Kleeman
- Lucie Lucas as Mati Vargnier
- Paulo Calatré as João
- Françoise Lebrun as Mother
- Leonor Brunner as Madeleine
- Leonor Cordes as Leonor
- Naga as Schmitty

== Release ==
The film premiered at the San Sebastián International Film Festival on September 19, 2016. On March 10, 2017, Kino Lorber acquired distribution rights to the film. The film was released on November 17, 2017, by Kino Lorber. It has a rating of 52% on Rotten tomatoes, based on 31 reviews, and 48 on Metacritic, based on 11.
