= What's Up, Scarlet? =

2005 film by Anthony Caldarella

- Directed by: Anthony Caldarella
- Written by: Anthony Caldarella; Susan Priver
- Produced by: Jesse B. Berger; Anthony Caldarella; Randy Sinquefield
- Starring: Susan Priver; Musetta Vander; Sally Kirkland; Jere Burns
- Cinematography: Geza Sinkovics
- Edited by: Katina Zinner
- Music by: Joe Deninzon; Stephen Graziano; John T. La Barbera
- Release date: June 18, 2005 (Frameline)
- Running time: 84 minutes
- Country: United States
- Language: English

What's Up, Scarlet? is a 2005 American romantic comedy-drama film directed by Anthony Caldarella and starring Susan Priver, Musetta Vander, Sally Kirkland and Jere Burns.

== Cast ==
- Susan Priver as Scarlet Zabrinski
- Musetta Vander as Sabrina Fisser
- Sally Kirkland as Ruth Zabrinski
- Jere Burns as Ben Zabrinski
- Carmen Argenziano as Mr. Maggiami
- Ron Gilbert as Mario
