= N.Y.P.D. (TV series) =

American police drama television series

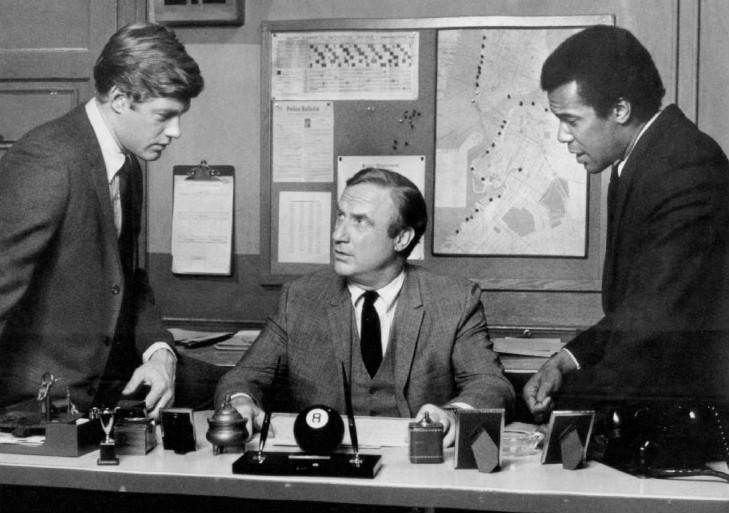
- The cast from left: Frank Converse, Jack Warden and Robert Hooks, 1969.
- Genre: Police crime drama
- Created by: Arnold Perl; David Susskind
- Written by: Lonne Elder III; Arnold Perl; Albert Ruben; David Susskind
- Directed by: Robert Butler; Alex March; Daniel Petrie; David Pressman
- Starring: Jack Warden; Robert Hooks; Frank Converse
- Theme music composer: Charles Gross
- Composer: Charles Gross
- Country of origin: United States
- Original language: English
- No. of seasons: 2
- No. of episodes: 49

Production
- Executive producer: Daniel Melnick
- Producer: Bob Markell
- Editor: Lyman Hallowell
- Running time: 30 minutes
- Production companies: Talent Associates, in association with the ABC Television Network

Original release
- Network: ABC
- Release: September 5, 1967 – March 25, 1969

N.Y.P.D. is a half-hour long American police crime drama set in the context of the New York City Police Department. The program aired on the ABC network from 1967–1969 in the 9:30 p.m. night time slot. During the second season, N.Y.P.D was joined by The Mod Squad and It Takes a Thief to form a 2½ hour block of crime dramas.

== Plot ==
N.Y.P.D. centers on three New York police detectives – Lieutenant Mike Haines (Jack Warden), Detective Jeff Ward (Robert Hooks), and Detective Johnny Corso (Frank Converse) – who fight a wide range of crimes and criminals. The show features many real New York City locations, as well as episodes based on actual New York City police cases.

== Cast ==
- Jack Warden as Lt. Mike Haines
- Robert Hooks as Det. Jeff Ward
- Frank Converse as Det. Johnny Corso
- Ted Beniades as Det. Richie
- Denise Nicholas as Ethel
- Tom Rosqui as Det. Jacobs

== Production ==
=== Development ===
The show was produced by Talent Associates, Ltd., a company founded by Alfred Levy and David Susskind. Talent Associates had produced 14 years of the anthology program Armstrong Circle Theatre and The Kaiser Aluminum Hour. David Susskind created N.Y.P.D. with screenwriter Arnold Perl (Cotton Comes to Harlem). Daniel Melnick, executive producer of N.Y.P.D., was a partner with Susskind in Talent Associates and had brought Mel Brooks and Buck Henry together to create the television comedy Get Smart in 1965. Producer Susskind and actor Harvey Keitel would work together again on Martin Scorsese's Alice Doesn't Live Here Anymore (1974). One of the writers on the series was Lonne Elder, who would later become the first African-American nominated for a Best Screenplay Oscar (for the 1972 movie Sounder).

=== Casting ===
Among the guest stars who appeared in the series were:

- Al Pacino (S02E05; "Deadly Circle of Violence")
- Martin Sheen (S02E08 "The Peep Freak")
- Jon Voight (S01E14; "The Bombers")
- Harvey Keitel (S02E06; "The Shady Lady")
- Jane Alexander (S02E14; "The Night Watch")
- Roy Scheider (S02E19; "Who's Got the Bundle?")
- Sam Waterston (S02E23; "No Day Trippers Need Apply")
- Charles Grodin (S01E06; "Money Man")
- Howard Da Silva (S01E07; "Old Gangsters Never Die")
- Murray Hamilton (S01E24; "The Private Eye Puzzle")
- Charles Durning (S02E01 "Naked in the Streets")

Others include: Robert Alda, Rutanya Alda, Conrad Bain, Philip Bosco, John Cazale, Leslie Charleson, Miriam Colon, Franklin Cover, Matthew Cowles, Blythe Danner, Ossie Davis, Joe Dorsey, Mary Fickett, Ron Gilbert, Scott Glenn, Mark Gordon, Moses Gunn, Graham Jarvis, James Earl Jones, Raul Julia, Jack Knight, Marcia Jean Kurtz, Laurence Luckinbill, Nancy Marchand, Bill Macy, Donna McKechnie, Meg Myles, Priscilla Pointer, Andrew Robinson, Esther Rolle, Richard Ward, Louis Zorich, Jill Clayburgh, Jane Elliot, Ralph Waite, Gretchen Corbett

=== Writing ===
In 1967, N.Y.P.D. was the first television series in America to air an episode with a self-identified gay character ("Shakedown"), which was the opening episode of the series. The plot centers around the police tracking down a blackmailer who has triggered several suicides by their targeting of gay men. In the course of their investigation, the police also visit a gay rights group, another television first.

N.Y.P.D. scripts featured both black and white people as cops, suspects, and witnesses, an unselfconscious racial blend that would not otherwise be seen for several years on American network television (Room 222 and Hawaii Five-O were among the next series to feature casts situated similarly.)

=== Opening credits ===
The series' opening credit sequence, prominently featuring a closeup of a police car emergency light as the vehicle drives through the streets of New York, would later be spoofed in the 1980s comedy series Police Squad! and subsequent movies.

== Episodes ==
=== Season 1 (1967–68) ===
No. overall	No. in season	Title	Directed by	Written by	Original release date
1	1	"Shakedown"	Daniel Petrie	Albert Ruben	September 5, 1967
A blackmail ring that targets homosexuals is investigated after it leads to a series of suicides.
2	2	"Fingerman"	John Moxey	George Bellak	September 12, 1967
Ward receives a series of hysterical calls from an informer who believes he's being followed by friends of a man he helped put in jail.
3	3	"The Screaming Woman"	Daniel Petrie	Robert Van Scoyk	September 19, 1967
Corso is suspended after being charged with attempted rape after he and Ward investigate complaints from a woman about noisy drunks.
4	4	"Fast Gun"	Alex March	Albert Ruben	September 26, 1967
A man with a quick trigger finger kills a detective and then taunts the police department.
5	5	"Walking Target"	Daniel Petrie	Edward Adler	October 3, 1967
A high-ranking foreign police official is nearly shot by a sniper during an award ceremony at city hall.
6	6	"Money Man"	John Howe	Edward Adler	October 10, 1967
The presence of a loan shark results in Ward and Corso going undercover in the construction industry to find out the reason for a series of unexplained deaths.
7	7	"Old Gangsters Never Die"	Alex March	Mark Jam	October 17, 1967
A professional hijacker (Howard Da Silva) emerges from a lengthy prison term and immediately resumes his old bad habits.
8	8	"Catch a Hero"	Robert Butler	Edward DeBlasio	October 31, 1967
Haines breaks down a girl's alibi whereby she incriminates her boyfriend in the brutal killing of a drunk.
9	9	"Murder for Infinity"	John Moxey	Ian McLellan Hunter	November 7, 1967
A sculptor wanted for murder contacts Haines' friend and bargains for a top defense lawyer.
10	10	"The Pink Gumdrop"	Gene Reynolds	Robert Crean	November 14, 1967
An attractive ex-convict who is a passenger in a stolen sports car, provides the lead in helping capture the head of a car theft ring.
11	11	"The Witness"	Robert Butler	Unknown	November 21, 1967
Ward is accused of accepting a bribe from a frontman during a crackdown on the numbers racket.
12	12	"Boy Witness"	David Pressman	S : Bill Westley; T : Albert Ruben	November 28, 1967
A 13-year-old boy is the only witness in the murder of an attractive young woman.
13	13	"Joshua Fit the Battle of Fulton Street"	Alex March	Lee Kalcheim	December 5, 1967
After a crime wave strikes a New York neighborhood, residents form a vigilante group.
14	14	"The Bombers"	Robert Gist	S : Elihu Winer; T : Edward DeBlasio	December 12, 1967
A fanatical anti-Communist (Jon Voight) and his fiancée bomb multiple Iron Curtain consulates, killing and injuring a number of people
15	15	"Wire Finish"	Hal Cooper	Edward DeBlasio	December 19, 1967
A jockey (Robert Salvio) is told during mysterious phone calls that two murders were committed in his name.
16	16	"Cruise to Oblivion"	John Moxey	Roger Hill Lewis	December 26, 1967
Haines gets a tip that a passenger aboard an incoming ocean liner is carrying narcotics into New York.
17	17	"The Patriots"	John Howe	Charles S. Israel	January 2, 1968
The wife of an exiled Latin American dictator is murdered, with the prime suspects being the dictator's political enemies.
18	18	"Red Headed Pigeon"	Lawrence Dobkin	George Bellak	January 16, 1968
An elusive rapist who always attacks young women with long hair results in the police department using a young policewoman just out of the academy as a decoy.
19	19	"Which Side Are You On?"	Alex March	Albert Ruben	January 30, 1968
After an elderly African-American high school teacher is killed, Ward goes to the neighborhood where the killing took place, but is met with cold hostility from the residents.
20	20	"Cry Brute"	Reza Badiyi	Alvin Boretz	February 6, 1968
Corso is accused of police brutality and is the central figure in a $100,000 lawsuit against the city.
21	21	"Last Port of Call"	Allen Reisner	Edward DeBlasio	February 13, 1968
A merchant seaman is accused of molesting children and instructed to stay aboard his ship, but he makes an effort to clear himself by visiting the parents of one of the children.
22	22	"Macho"	Alex March	Edward DeBlasio	February 20, 1968
A Puerto Rican grocer's life is threatened and his store is boycotted after he saves a policeman from an attack by a gang of neighborhood boys.
23	23	"Stones"	Larry Arrick	George Bellak	February 27, 1968
Corso infiltrates a gang of "thrill muggers" who victimize elderly vagrants in Central Park.
24	24	"The Private Eye Puzzle"	Joshua Shelby	Alvin Boretz	March 5, 1968
A former private eye reports that he was robbed of a large sum of money, but has no witnesses to back up his story.
25	25	"Nothing Is Real but the Dead: Part 1"	Alex March	Edward Adler	March 12, 1968
Haines and Corso search for a young girl who left her wealthy parents to take up life as a Greenwich Village hippie.
26	26	"Nothing Is Real but the Dead: Part 2"	Alex March	Edward Adler	March 19, 1968
Two Greenwich Village hippies who can identify a killer go into hiding out of fear of him.

=== Season 2 (1968–69) ===
No. overall	No. in season	Title	Directed by	Written by	Original release date
27	1	"Naked in the Streets"	Stuart Hagman	David Davidson	October 1, 1968
After a young married woman is raped, the detectives are stymied when she refuses to sign a complaint against the attacker.
28	2	"Encounter on a Rooftop"	John Manduke	Gene Radano	October 8, 1968
Ward is accidentally shot by a rookie policeman after he's mistaken for a burglar.
29	3	"Day Tripper"	David Pressman	George Bellak	October 15, 1968
An attractive young girl is found murdered and all the evidence points to her boyfriend as the killer.
30	4	"What's a Nice Girl ..."	Reze Bella	Leo Hutchinson	October 29, 1968
After the death of a beautiful young girl, the damaged relationship between a spoiled son and his wealthy father becomes part of the subsequent interrogation.
31	5	"Deadly Circle of Violence"	David Pressman	Lonne Elder	November 12, 1968
A motive is sought for the attempted killing of a disreputable white southerner (Al Pacino), with suspicions pointing toward black militants who are seeking revenge for the bombing of an African-American church in the South.
32	6	"Case of the Shady Lady"	Vincent Benedict	Alvin Boretz	November 19, 1968
A go-go dancer accuses an influential businessman (Robert Alda) of murdering her husband.
33	7	"The Golden Fleece"	Davis Pressman	Robert Lewis	November 26, 1968
Detectives have difficulty tracking down a con artist who has swindled an out-of-town businessman out of $5,000.
34	8	"The Peep Freak"	David Pressman	Stanley H. Silverman	December 3, 1968
While investigating the murder of a young woman, the police discover a peeping Tom (Martin Sheen) who they believe is connected with the slaying.
35	9	"Walk the Long Pier"	Reza Badiyi	Alvin Boretz	December 10, 1968
Corso poses as a longshoreman in order to stop the theft of guns on the docks.
36	10	"The Witch of 116th Street"	Reza Badiyi	Lee Kalchein	December 17, 1968
An extortionist is threatening residents with his self-proclaimed powers of black magic.
37	11	"'L' Is for Love and Larceny"	Reza Badiyi	Albert Ruben	December 24, 1968
Haines investigates the theft of an expensive pendant from the apartment of one of his friends.
38	12	"The Love Hustle"	Nicholas Colasanto	Bernard Eismann	December 31, 1968
A prostitute staggers into the squad room and just before she dies, she indicates that an unknown man is planning to kill her mother.
39	13	"The Body in the Trunk"	David Pressman	Heyward Gould	January 7, 1969
After the mysterious death of a young woman, the detectives are confronted with the woman's frightened boyfriend, her irate parents and an abortion doctor.
40	14	"The Night Watch"	Nicholas Colasanto	Lee Kalchein	January 21, 1969
The search is on for a health food addict whose fanaticism eventually leads to murder.
41	15	"Three-Fifty-Two"	Alex March	Gene Rodano	January 28, 1969
Ward loses his gun and shield during a holdup, with the entire police squad taking action to apprehend the thieves (Andy Robinson) .
42	16	"The Attacker"	David Pressman	Heyward Gould	February 4, 1969
A man who has been attacking women in a specific neighborhood eludes detection at first when he becomes part of a group that confess to all sorts of crimes.
43	17	"Candy Man: Part 1"	Alex March	Robert Schiltt	February 11, 1969
The detectives head to a drug rehabilitation center run by Candy Latson (James Earl Jones) in their search for a grocery store thief.
44	18	"Candy Man: Part 2"	Alex March	Robert Schlitt	February 18, 1969
In an attempt to capture the grocery store thief, Corso observes a group therapy session at the rehab center.
45	19	"Who's Got the Bundle?"	Tom Donovan	Alvin Boretz	February 25, 1969
Both police and criminals are in search of a valise that contains $150,000 in stolen money.
46	20	"The Face on the Dart Board"	Nicholas Colasanto	Gene Radano	March 4, 1969
Haines' wife is harassed by crank calls, obscene letters and other disturbances, which are attributed to a vendetta against Haines.
47	21	"Boys Night Out"	David Pressman	Burt Armus	March 11, 1969
A number of neighborhood bartenders are being shaken down by extortionists.
48	22	"Everybody Loved Him"	David Pressman	Heyward Gould	March 18, 1969
A film producer who appeared to have no enemies is murdered.
49	23	"No Day Trippers Need Apply"	Nicholas Colasanto	Mel Alright	March 25, 1969
A man is being blackmailed after the appearance of pictures showing him attending an orgy.
