= Danse avec les stars season 11 =

Danse avec les stars
- Season 11
- Celebrity winner: Tayc
- Professional winner: Fauve Hautot
- No. of episodes: 11

Release
- Original network: TF1
- Original release: 17 September – 26 November 2021

Season chronology
- ← Previous; Season 10 Next → Season 12

The eleventh season of Danse avec les stars, (the French version of Strictly Come Dancing), premiered in September 2021 on TF1, hosted by Camille Combal.

== Things To Know ==
Jean Baptiste Maunier Lola Dubini and Vaimalama Chaves were originally planned to compete in 2020 but because of COVID-19 pandemic the show was cancelled and then they get recast that season

Jean Baptiste Maunier was asked to compete on season 6 but refuses

Vaimalama Chaves is the first contestant from the French Polynesia

Bilal Hassani became the first LGBTQ+ contestant to compete, he dances with a male partner

Claude Dartois was supposed to appear in the season but because of his participation in the 20 years All-Stars season of Koh Lanta which was aired on the same schedule he refuses to do it but appears in the audience with Laurent Maistret to cheer Moussa Niang he will finally be cast 3 seasons later on 2025

== Participants ==
Celebrity	Known for	Partner	Status
Lââm	Singer	Maxime Dereymez	Eliminated 1st on 17 September 2021
Lola Dubini	Actress & Comedienne	Joël Luzolo	Eliminated 2nd on 24 September 2021
Moussa Niang	Adventurer	Coralie Licata	Eliminated 3rd on 1 October 2021
Jean-Baptiste Maunier	Singer & Comedian	Inès Vandamme	Eliminated 4th on 8 October 2021
Vaimalama Chaves	Miss France 2019	Christian Millette	Eliminated 5th on 15 October 2021
Wejdene	Singer	Samuel Texier	Eliminated 6th on 22 October 2021
Lucie Lucas	Comedienne	Anthony Colette	Eliminated 7th on 29 October 2021
Gérémy Crédeville	Comedian	Candice Pascal	Eliminated 8th on 5 November 2021
Dita Von Teese	Burlesque Dancer & model	Christophe Licata	Eliminated 9th on 12 November 2021
Aurélie Pons	Comedienne	Adrien Caby	Eliminated 10th on 19 November 2021
Michou	YouTuber	Elsa Bois	Third Place on 26 November 2021
Bilal Hassani	Singer	Jordan Mouillerac	Runner Up on 26 November 2021
Tayc	Singer	Fauve Hautot	Winners on 26 November 2021

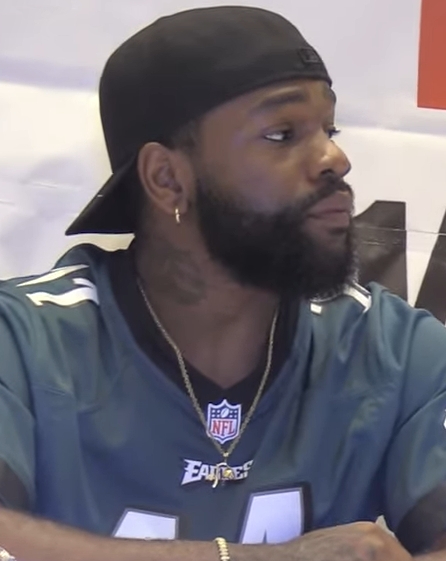
Tayc

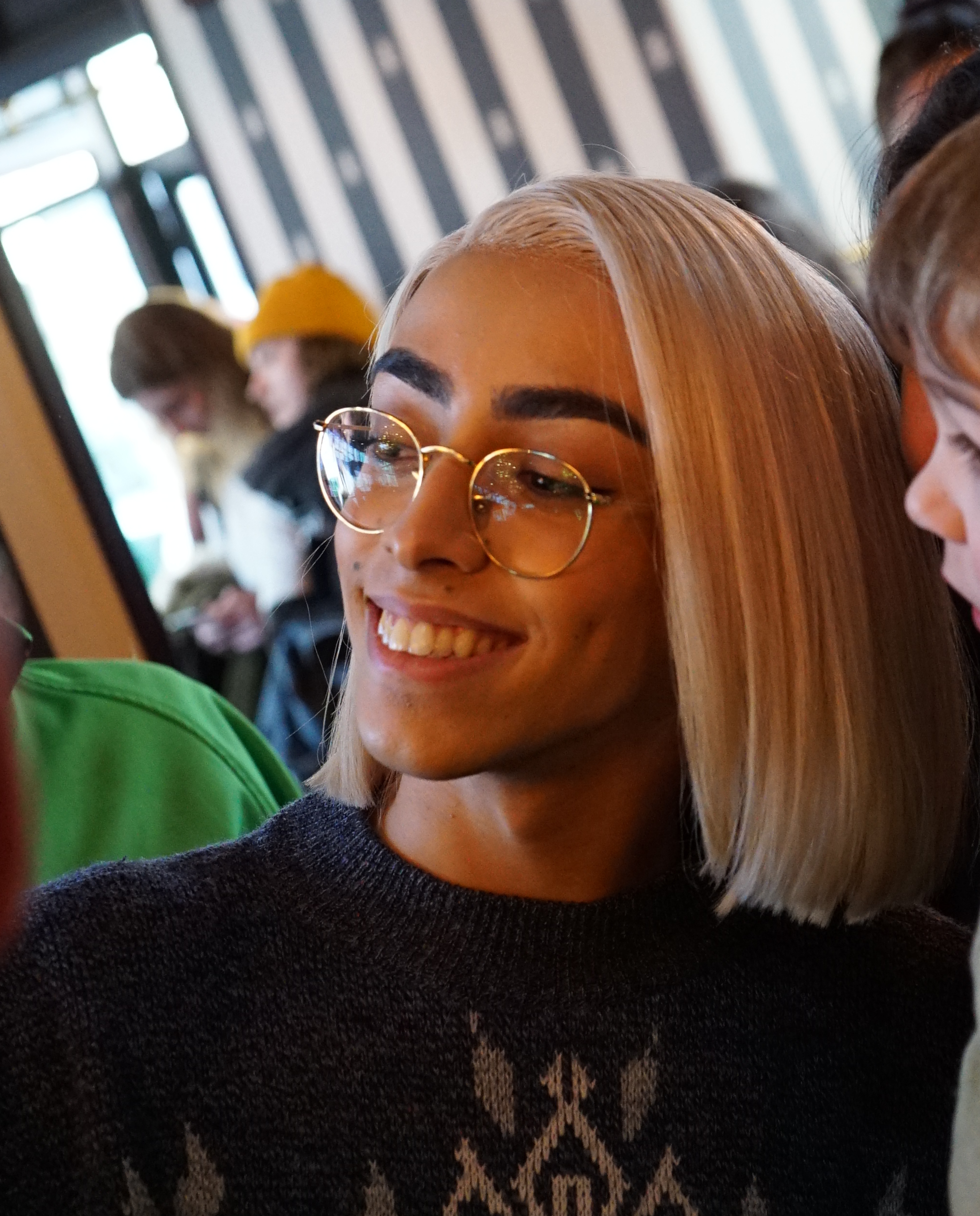
Bilal Hassani

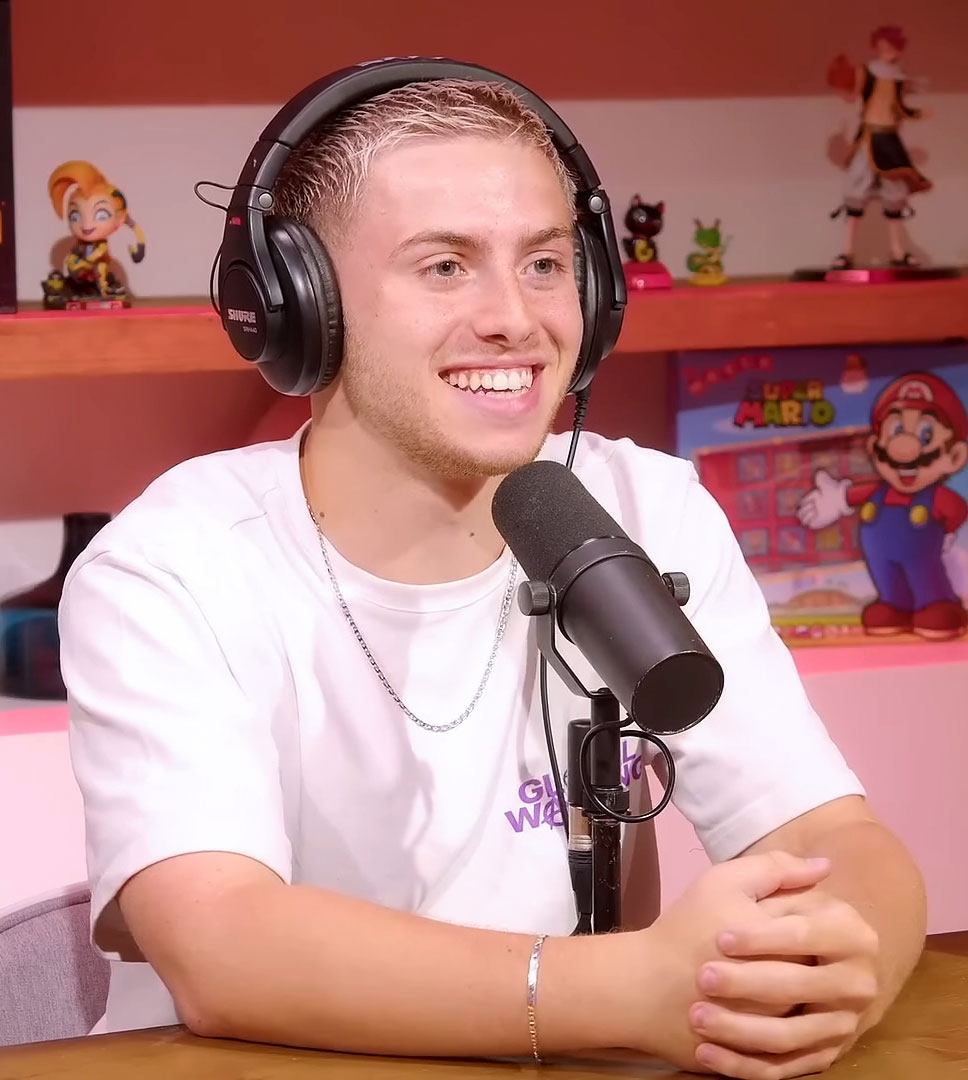
Michou

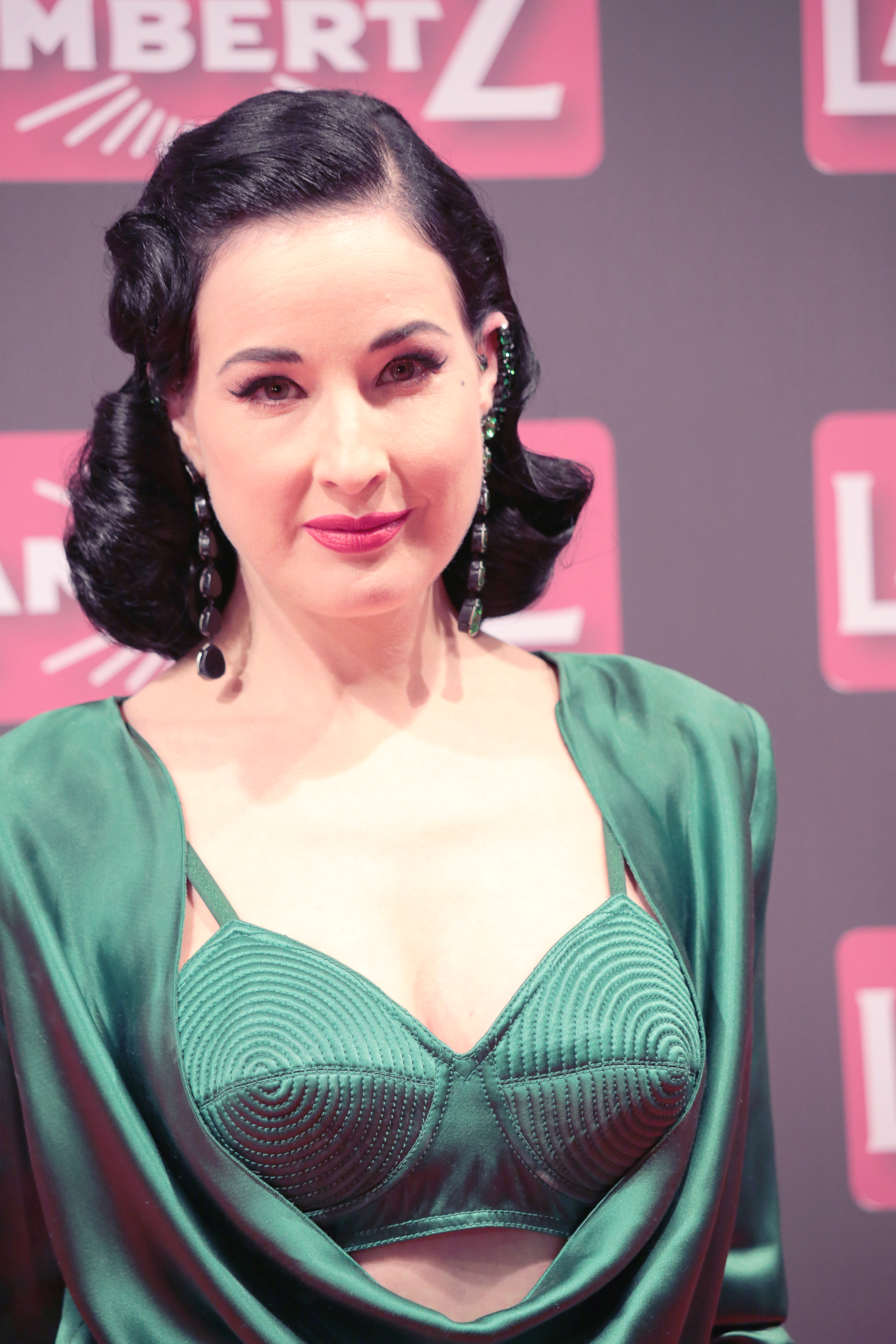
Dita Von Teese

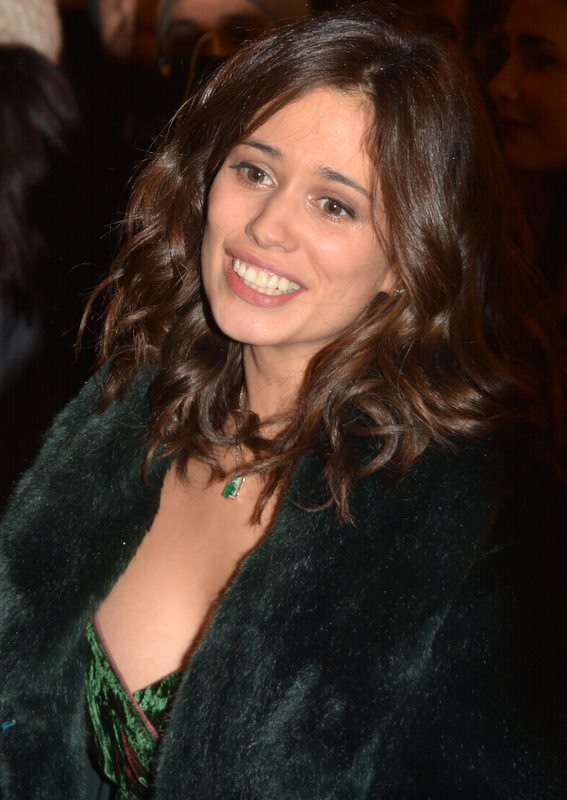
Lucie Lucas

Wejdene

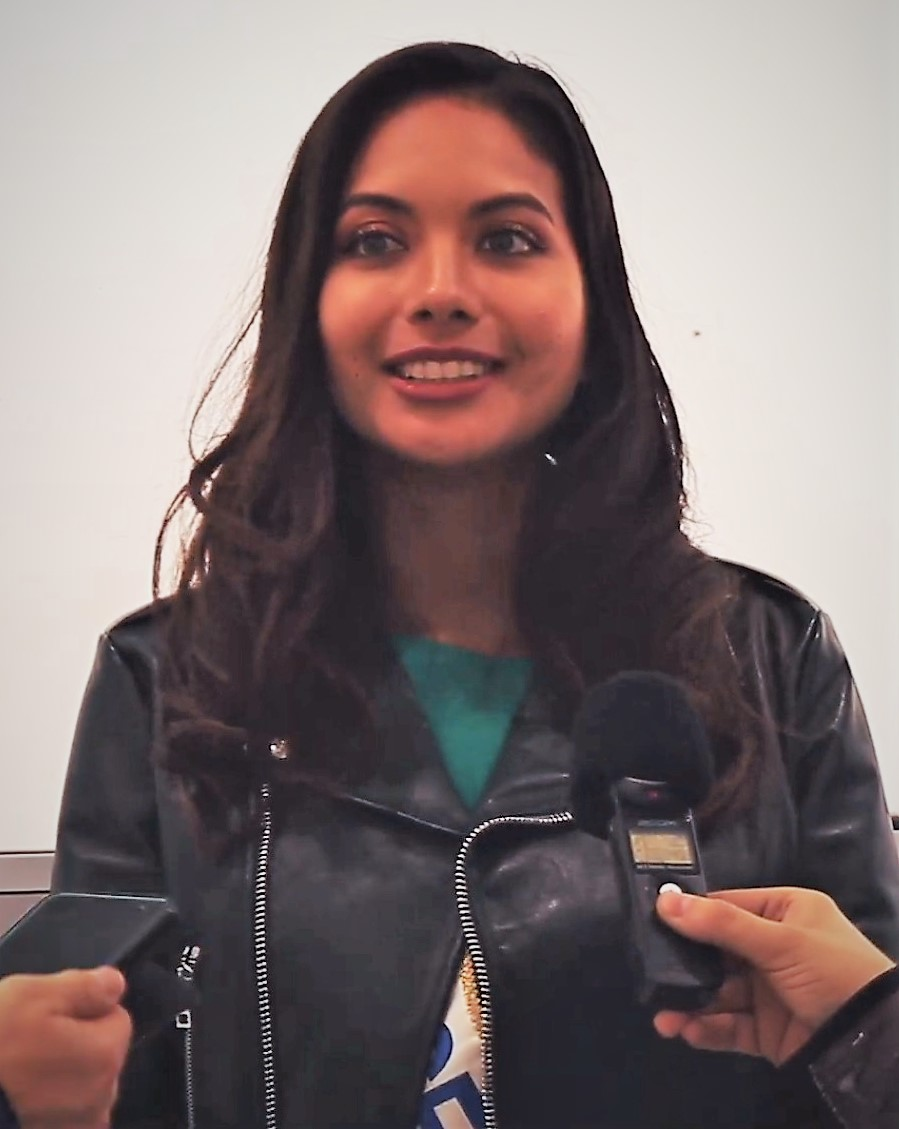
Vaimalama Chaves

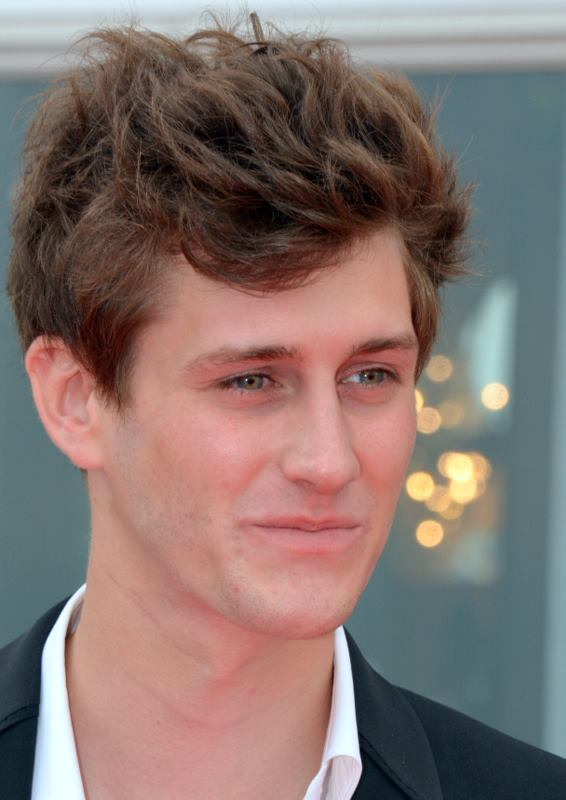
Jean-Baptiste Maunier

Lola Dubini

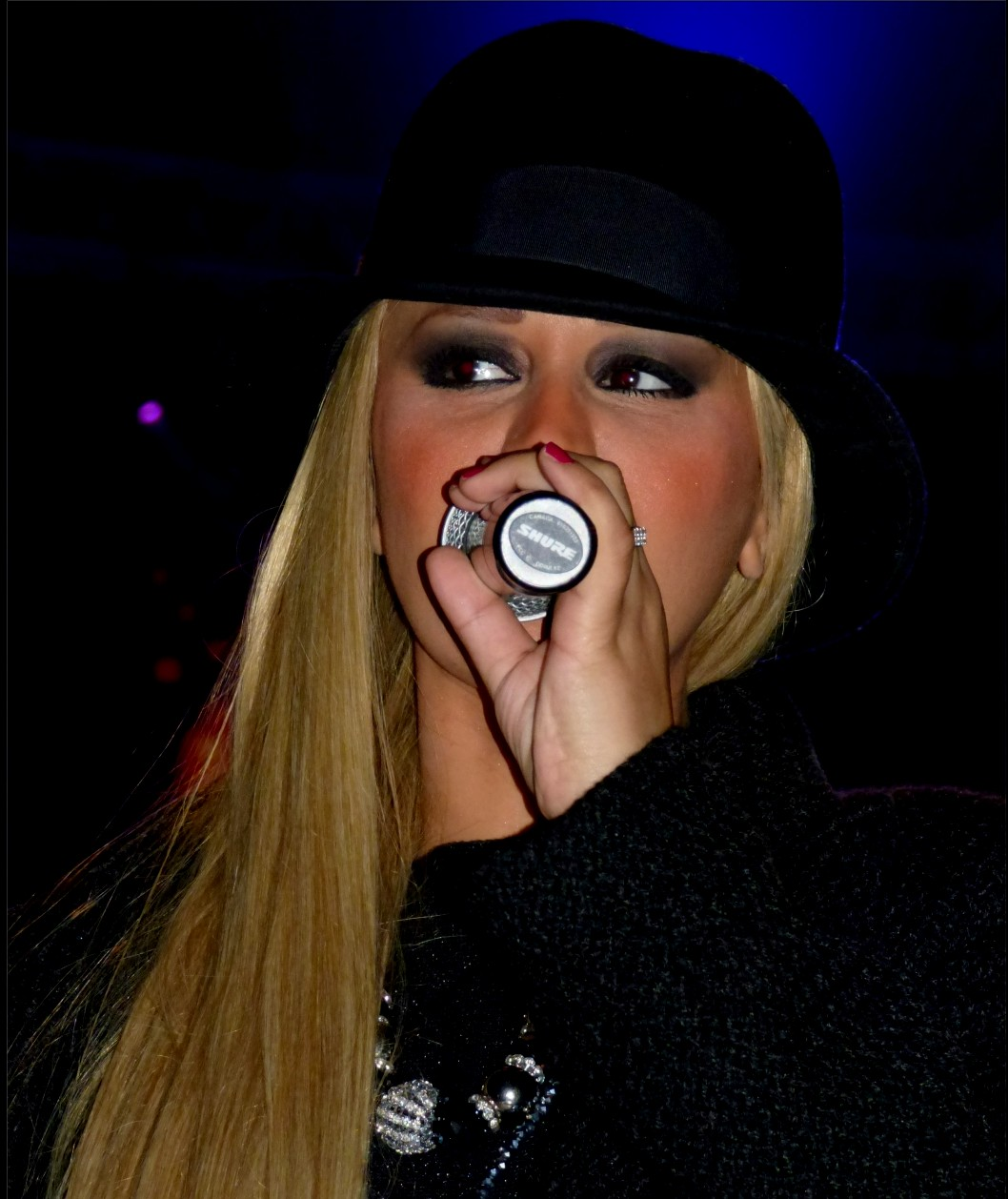
Lââm

== Scoring ==
Team	Place	1	2	3	4	5	6	7	8	9	10	11
Tayc & Fauve	1		4 Buzz	28 + 18 = 46	30	34 + 20 = 54	32	42,2	36 + 32 = 68	37 + 34 = 71	37	40
Bilal & Jordan	2	4 Buzz		35	33	35	33	39,9	31 + 27 = 58	37 + 37 = 74	35 + 35 = 70	39
Michou & Elsa	3		21 + 20 = 41	24 + 12 = 36	26	3 Buzz	25	35,9	31 + 27 = 58	29	28 + 32 = 60	32
Aurélie & Adrien	4		27 + 10 = 37	23 + 14 = 37	21	29 + 18 = 47	23	33,5	29 + 32 = 61	27	30 + 26 = 56	
Dita & Christophe	5		4 Buzz	30 + 20 = 50	35	32 + 16 = 48	32	39,2	/	31+32 = 63		
Gérémy & Candice	6		25 + 15 = 40	27 + 8 = 35	30	3 Buzz	26	39,9	23 + 25 = 48			
Lucie & Anthony	7	29 + 20 = 49		28 + 16 = 44	26	2 Buzz	24	28,6				
Wejdene & Samuel	8	25 + 10 = 35		26 + 10 = 36	27	28 + 14 = 42	24					
Vaimalama & Christian	9		21	23 + 6 = 29	26	26 + 12 = 38						
Jean-Baptiste & Inès	10	28 + 15 = 43		21	25							
Moussa & Coralie	11	25 + 5 = 30		22 + 4 = 26								
Lola & Joël	12		22 + 5 = 27									
Lââm & Maxime	13	20										

Red numbers indicate couples with the lowest score for each week.
Blue numbers indicate couples with the highest score for each week.
Green numbers indicate couples who did not dance their second dance for each week.
the couple earned immunity, and could not be eliminated
indicates couples eliminated that week.
indicates the returning couple who finished in the bottom two.
indicates the winning couple.
indicates the runner-up couple.
indicates the third place couple.

=== Notes of each couples ===
Couple	Total	10	9	8	7	6	5	4	3	2	1	Average
Tayc & Fauve	44	6	17	14	6	1	—N/a					8.5
Bilal & Jordan	48	8	18	15	4	3	—N/a					8.5
Michou & Elsa	44	1	2	10	15	11	4	1	—N/a			6.9
Aurélie & Adrien	44	—N/a	2	7	16	12	7	—N/a				6.7
Dita & Christophe	28	1	5	14	8	—N/a						8.0
Gérémy & Candice	28	—N/a		6	9	11	2	—N/a				6.7
Lucie & Anthony	20	—N/a		1	10	5	4	—N/a				6.4
Wejdene & Samuel	20	—N/a		2	8	8	2	—N/a				6.5
Vaimalama & Christian	16	—N/a			6	5	4	1	—N/a			6.0
Jean-Baptiste & Inès	12	—N/a		1	3	5	3	—N/a				6.2
Moussa & Coralie	8	—N/a			2	4	1	1	—N/a			5.9
Lola & Joël	4	—N/a			1	1	1	1	—N/a			5.5
Lââm & Maxime	4	—N/a			1	—N/a	1	2	—N/a			5
Total	320	16	44	70	89	66	29	6	0	0	0	7.2

== Highest and lowest scoring performances ==
The best and worst dance performances according to the judges' marks were, out of 40 points (Prime 7 scores are recalculated out of 40):

Dance	Best dancer	Best score	Worst dancer	Worst score
Argentine Tango	Dita Von Teese	4 Buzz	Vaimalama Chaves	26
Samba	Tayc	4 Buzz	Wejdene	25
Tango	Bilal Hassani	33	Jean-Baptiste Maunier	28
Contemporary	Bilal Hassani	4 Buzz	Lucie Lucas	22.88
Quickstep	Tayc	36	Lââm	20
Paso Doble	Bilal Hassani	37	Moussa Niang	25
Cha-Cha-Cha	Tayc	37	Gérémy Crédeville; Michou	3 Buzz
Waltz	Tayc	34	Jean-Baptiste Maunier	21
Foxtrot	Michou	28	Michou	21
Rumba	Dita Von Teese	35	Lucie Lucas	2 Buzz
Jive	Bilal Hassani	35	Aurélie Pons	21
American Smooth	Bilal Hassani	35	Gérémy Crédeville; Wejdene	26
Jazz Broadway	Dita Von Teese	32	Dita Von Teese	32
Salsa	Lucie Lucas	24	Lucie Lucas	24
Charleston	Bilal Hassani; Michou	27	Bilal Hassani; Michou	27
Freestyle	Tayc	40	Michou	32

== Couples' Highest and lowest scoring performances ==
According to the traditional 40-point scale (Week 7 scores are recalculated out of 40):

Couples	Highest Scoring Dances	Lowest Scoring Dances
Tayc and Fauve	Freestyle (40)	Rumba (28)
Bilal and Jordan	Freestyle (39)	Cha-Cha-Cha (31)
Michou and Elsa	Samba; Freestyle (32)	Foxtrot (21)
Aurélie and Adrien	Argentine Tango (30)	Jive (21)
Dita and Christophe	Rumba (35)	Cha-Cha-Cha (30)
Gérémy and Candice	Contemporary (31.92)	Quickstep (23)
Lucie and Anthony	Argentine Tango (29)	Contemporary (22.88)
Wejdene and Samuel	Quickstep (28)	Rumba (24)
Vaimalama and Christian	Quickstep; Argentine Tango (26)	Cha-Cha-Cha (21)
Jean-Baptiste and Inès	Tango / Contemporary (28)	Waltz (21)
Moussa and Coralie	Paso Doble (25)	Cha-Cha-Cha (22)
Lola and Joël	Cha-Cha-Cha (22)	Cha-Cha-Cha (22)
Lââm and Maxime	Quickstep (20)	Quickstep (20)

== Averages ==
This table only counts dances scored on the traditional 40-point scale.

Rank by average	Place	Couple	Total	Number of dances	Number of dances scored	Average
1	2	Bilal & Jordan	408	15	12	34,00
2	1	Tayc & Fauve	373	14	11	33,91
3	5	Dita & Christophe	223	8	7	31,86
4	3	Michou & Elsa	303	12	11	27,55
5	6	Gérémy & Candice	187	8	7	26,71
6	4	Aurélie & Adrien	293	11	11	26,64
7	8	Wejdene & Samuel	130	5	5	26,00
8	7	Lucie & Anthony	128	6	5	25,60
9	10	Jean-Baptiste & Inès	74	3	3	24,67
10	9	Vaimalama & Christian	96	4	4	24,00
11	11	Moussa & Coralie	47	2	2	23,50
12	12	Lola & Joël	22	1	1	22,00
13	13	Lââm & Maxime	20	1	1	20,00

== Weekly Scores ==
=== Week 1 ===
Individual judges scores in the chart below (given in parentheses) appeared in this order from left to right: Jean-Paul Gaultier, Denitsa Ikonomova, François Alu, Chris Marques.

Each of the four judges have a golden buzzer, if all the four judges buzz for a couple then, that couple is directly qualified for week 3 without passing by the second round.

In the other hand, the couple finishing last according to the judges is directly sent in face-to-face without passing by the second round.

Running order

Couple	Score	Style	Music	Total
Lucie & Anthony	29 (7,7,7,8)	Argentine Tango	Allumer le feu - Johnny Hallyday (Brigitte version)	
Wejdene & Samuel	25 (7,6,6,6)	Samba	Déjà Vu - Beyoncé ft. Jay-Z	
Jean-Baptiste & Inès	28 (6,7,8,7)	Contemporary Tango	Derrière le brouillard - Grand Corps Malade ft. Louane	
Lââm & Maxime	20 (7,4,5,4)	Quickstep	The Nanny theme - Ann Hampton Callaway	
Bilal & Jordan	4 Buzz	Contemporary	Courage to Change - Sia	
Moussa & Coralie	25 (7,6,6,6)	Paso Doble	Koh-Lanta theme - Philippe Pelet ft. Olivier Perrot-Poitou	
Imposed figure relay
Lucie & Anthony	+20	Cha-Cha-Cha	Bebeto - Kendji Girac	49
Jean-Baptiste & Inès	+15	Cha-Cha-Cha	Bebeto - Kendji Girac	43
Wejdene & Samuel	+10	Cha-Cha-Cha	Bebeto - Kendji Girac	35
Moussa and Coralie	+5	Cha-Cha-Cha	Bebeto - Kendji Girac	30
Face To Face
Moussa & Coralie	Safe (54%)	Cha-Cha-Cha	Juice - Lizzo	
Wejdene & Samuel	Safe (43%)	Cha-Cha-Cha	Juice - Lizzo	
Lââm & Maxime	Eliminated (3%)	Cha-Cha-Cha	Juice - Lizzo	

Judges' votes to save

- Gaultier: Wejdene & Samuel
- Ikonomova: Wejdene & Samuel
- Alu: Wejdene & Samuel
- Marques: Lââm & Maxime

=== Week 2 ===
Individual judges scores in the chart below (given in parentheses) appeared in this order from left to right: Jean-Paul Gaultier, Denitsa Ikonomova, François Alu, Chris Marques.

Each of the four judges have a golden buzzer, if all the four judges buzz for a couple then, that couple is directly qualified for week 3 without passing by the second round.

In the other hand, the couple finishing last according to the judges is directly sent in face-to-face without passing by the second round.

Running order

Couple	Score	Style	Music	Total
Aurélie & Adrien	27 (7,7,7,6)	Argentine Tango	7 Rings - Ariana Grande	
Tayc & Fauve	4 Buzz	Samba	On the Low - Burna Boy	
Vaimalama & Christian	21 (6,6,5,4)	Cha-Cha-Cha	Le reste - Clara Luciani	
Gérémy & Candice	25 (7,6,6,6)	Waltz	Aline - Jim Bauer	
Dita & Christophe	4 Buzz	Argentine Tango	I Got You (I Feel Good) - James Brown (Jessie J version)	
Michou & Elsa	21 (7,5,4,5)	Foxtrot	Les filles d'aujourd'hui - Joyce Jonathan ft. Vianney	
Lola & Joël	22 (7,5,6,4)	Cha-Cha-Cha	Femme Like U (Donne-moi ton corps) - K.Maro	
Imposed figure relay
Michou & Elsa	+20	Paso Doble	Bella ciao - Naestro, Gims, Slimane, Vitaa & Dadju	41
Gérémy & Candice	+15	Paso Doble	Bella ciao - Naestro, Gims, Slimane, Vitaa & Dadju	40
Aurélie & Adrien	+10	Paso Doble	Bella ciao - Naestro, Gims, Slimane, Vitaa & Dadju	37
Lola & Joël	+5	Paso Doble	Bella ciao - Naestro, Gims, Slimane, Vitaa & Dadju	27
Face To Face
Vaimalama & Christian	Safe (36%)	Paso Doble	Come Together - The Beatles (Michael Jackson version)	
Aurélie & Adrien	Safe (30%)	Paso Doble	Come Together - The Beatles (Michael Jackson version)	
Lola & Joël	Eliminated (34%)	Paso Doble	Come Together - The Beatles (Michael Jackson version)	

Judges' votes to save

- Gaultier: Lola & Joël
- Ikonomova: Aurélie & Adrien
- Alu: Aurélie & Adrien
- Marques: Aurélie & Adrien

=== Week 3 ===
Individual judges scores in the chart below (given in parentheses) appeared in this order from left to right: Jean-Paul Gaultier, Denitsa Ikonomova, François Alu, Chris Marques.

The couple finishing first according to the judges is directly qualified for week 4 without passing by the second round.

The couple finishing last, according to the judges, is directly sent in face-to-face without passing by the second round.

Running order

Couple	Score	Style	Music	Result
Lucie & Anthony	28 (7,7,7,7)	Waltz	Mais je t'aime - Grand Corps Malade ft. Camille Lellouche	Safe
Tayc & Fauve	28 (7,7,8,6)	Rumba	U Remind Me - Usher	Safe
Vaimalama & Christian	23 (7,6,5,5)	Rumba Contemporary	Corps - Yseult	Bottom three
Jean-Baptiste & Inès	21 (6,5,5,5)	Waltz	Riche - Claudio Capéo	Bottom three
Dita & Christophe	30 (8,8,7,7)	Cha-Cha-Cha	Tears Dry on Their Own - Amy Winehouse	Safe
Michou & Elsa	24 (7,6,5,6)	Jive	Stay - The Kid Laroi ft. Justin Bieber	Safe
Wejdene & Samuel	26 (8,6,6,6)	American Smooth	I'll Never Love Again - Lady Gaga ft. Bradley Cooper	Safe
Bilal & Jordan	35 (9,9,9,8)	Jive	Faith - Stevie Wonder ft. Ariana Grande	Immunity
Aurélie & Adrien	23 (5,7,6,5)	Rumba	Bravo tu as gagné - Clara Luciani	Safe
Gérémy & Candice	27 (8,6,7,6)	Argentine Tango	Si bien du mal - Hervé	Safe
Moussa & Coralie	22 (7,5,6,4)	Cha-Cha-Cha	Skate - Silk Sonic	Eliminated
Imposed figure relay
Dita & Christophe	+20	Quickstep	Happy - Pharrell Williams	50
Tayc & Fauve	+18	Quickstep	Happy - Pharrell Williams	46
Lucie & Anthony	+16	Quickstep	Happy - Pharrell Williams	44
Aurélie & Adrien	+14	Quickstep	Happy - Pharrell Williams	37
Michou & Elsa	+12	Quickstep	Happy - Pharrell Williams	36
Wejdene & Samuel	+10	Quickstep	Happy - Pharrell Williams	36
Gérémy & Candice	+8	Quickstep	Happy - Pharrell Williams	35
Vaimalama & Christian	+6	Quickstep	Happy - Pharrell Williams	29
Moussa & Coralie	+4	Quickstep	Happy - Pharrell Williams	26
Face To Face
Jean-Baptiste & Inès	Safe (37%)	Quickstep	Lisztomania - Phoenix	
Vaimalama & Christian	Safe (34%)	Quickstep	Lisztomania - Phoenix	
Moussa & Coralie	Eliminated (29%)	Quickstep	Lisztomania - Phoenix	

Judges' votes to save

- Gaultier: Vaimalama & Christian
- Ikonomova: Vaimalama & Christian
- Alu: Vaimalama & Christian
- Marques: Moussa & Coralie

=== Week 4 ===
Individual judges scores in the chart below (given in parentheses) appeared in this order from left to right: Jean-Paul Gaultier, Denitsa Ikonomova, François Alu, Chris Marques.

The ten remaining couples are put into five duels based on the prime 3 results. The duels' winners are qualified for prime 5 while losers are in face to face.

Running order

Couple	Score	Style	Music	Result
Tayc & Fauve	30 (8,7,8,7)	American Smooth	Leave the Door Open – Silk Sonic	Safe
Lucie & Anthony	26 (7,6,7,6)	Samba	Fever – Dua Lipa & Angèle	Bottom five
Vaimalama & Christian	26 (6,7,7,6)	Quickstep	These Boots Are Made for Walkin' - The Supremes	Safe
Jean-Baptiste & Inès	25 (7,6,6,6)	Cha-Cha-Cha	I Wanna Be Your Lover – Prince	Bottom five
Aurélie & Adrien	21 (6,5,5,5)	Jive	Candide Crush – Therapie Taxi	Bottom five
Michou & Elsa	26 (7,6,6,7)	Quickstep	It's Not Unusual - Tom Jones	Safe
Dita & Christophe	35 (9,9,8,9)	Rumba	Madame rêve – Alain Bashung	Safe
Bilal & Jordan	33 (8,8,9,8)	Tango	3SEX – Indochine & Christine and the Queens	Bottom five
Gérémy & Candice	30 (8,7,7,8)	Rumba	Dancing On My Own – Calum Scott	Safe
Wejdene & Samuel	27 (7,7,6,7)	Argentine Tango	Donne-moi ton cœur - Louane	Bottom five
Face To Face
Lucie & Anthony	Saved by the jury	Cha-Cha-Cha	Bad Habits - Ed Sheeran	
Aurélie & Adrien	Saved by the public	Cha-Cha-Cha	Bad Habits - Ed Sheeran	
Jean-Baptiste & Inès	Eliminated	Cha-Cha-Cha	Bad Habits - Ed Sheeran	
Bilal & Jordan	Saved by the public	Cha-Cha-Cha	Bad Habits - Ed Sheeran	
Wejdene & Samuel	Saved by the jury	Cha-Cha-Cha	Bad Habits - Ed Sheeran	

=== Week 5 ===
Individual judges scores in the chart below (given in parentheses) appeared in this order from left to right: Jean-Paul Gaultier, Denitsa Ikonomova, François Alu, Chris Marques.

The judges have red buzzer, if at least two judges buzz a performance, the couples is directly sent in face to face without passing by the second round.

Running order

Couple	Score	Style	Music	Result
Tayc & Fauve	34 (9,9,8,8)	Contemporary	Formidable - Stromae	Safe
Vaimalama & Christian	26 (7,7,7,5)	Argentine Tango	Et même après je t'aimerai - Hoshi	Eliminated
Michou & Elsa	3 Buzz	Cha-Cha-Cha	Dynamite - BTS	Bottom 4
Lucie & Anthony	2 Buzz	Rumba	La meilleure - Hatik	Bottom 4
Aurélie & Adrien	29 (8,7,7,7)	Paso Doble	I Wanna Be Your Slave - Måneskin	Safe
Dita & Christophe	32 (8,8,8,8)	Jazz Broadway	Don't Speak - Haley Reinhart	Safe
Wejdene & Samuel	28 (7,7,7,7)	Quickstep	Fascination - Alphabeat	Safe
Bilal & Jordan	35 (9,9,8,9)	American Smooth	L’effet de masse - Maëlle	Immunity
Gérémy & Candice	3 Buzz	Cha-Cha-Cha	Machistador - Matthieu Chedid	Bottom 4
Imposed figure relay
Tayc & Fauve	+20	Jive	Runaway Baby - Bruno Mars	54
Aurélie & Adrien	+18	Jive	Runaway Baby - Bruno Mars	47
Dita & Christophe	+16	Jive	Runaway Baby - Bruno Mars	48
Wejdene & Samuel	+14	Jive	Runaway Baby - Bruno Mars	42
Vaimalama & Christian	+12	Jive	Runaway Baby - Bruno Mars	38
Face To Face
Michou & Elsa	Saved by the public	Jive	One Way Or Another - One Direction	
Lucie & Anthony	Saved by the jury	Jive	One Way Or Another - One Direction	
Gérémy & Candice	Saved by the jury	Jive	One Way Or Another - One Direction	
Vaimalama & Christian	Eliminated	Jive	One Way Or Another - One Direction	

=== Week 6 ===
Individual judges scores in the chart below (given in parentheses) appeared in this order from left to right: Jean-Paul Gaultier, Denitsa Ikonomova, François Alu, Chris Marques.

All the couples who received fewer than 30 points are sent in face to face.

Running order

Couple	Score	Style	Music	Result
Aurélie & Adrien	23 (5,6,6,6)	Waltz	T'es Beau - Sophie-Tith	Bottom five
Tayc & Fauve	32 (8,8,9,7)	Paso Doble	"Gangsta's Paradise" - Coolio	Safe
Lucie & Anthony	24 (7,5,6,6)	Salsa	Don't Go Yet - Camila Cabello	Bottom Five
Michou & Elsa	25 (7,6,7,5)	Rumba	Dans Mes Bras - Kendji Girac & Dadju	Bottom Five
Dita & Christophe	32 (8,8,8,8)	Paso Doble	Boys - Lizzo	Safe
Wejdene & Samuel	24 (8,6,5,5)	Rumba	Message Personnel - Françoise Hardy	Eliminated
Bilal & Jordan	33 (9,8,8,8)	Quickstep	Another Day of Sun from La La Land	Safe
Gérémy & Candice	26 (7,6,6,7)	American Smooth	No Surprises - Radiohead	Bottom five
Face To Face
Aurélie & Adrien	Saved by the public	Tango	La Grenade - Clara Luciani	
Lucie & Anthony	Saved by the jury	Tango	La Grenade - Clara Luciani	
Michou & Elsa	Saved by the public	Tango	La Grenade - Clara Luciani	
Wejdene & Samuel	Eliminated	Tango	La Grenade - Clara Luciani	
Gérémy & Candice	Saved by the jury	Tango	La Grenade - Clara Luciani	

=== Week 7 ===
Individual judges scores in the chart below (given in parentheses) appeared in this order from left to right: Jean-Paul Gaultier, Denitsa Ikonomova, François Alu, Chris Marques, Public.

Couples are in tw groups based on week 6 results:
- Group 1: Lucie & Anthony, Michou & Elsa, Aurélie & Adrien, Gérémy & Candice.
- Group 2: Tayc & Fauve, Dita & Christophe, Bilal & Jordan.

The two best scores from each group are qualified for week 8 while others are sent in face to face.

Running order

Couple	Score	Public	Total	Style	Music	Result
Lucie & Anthony	21 (5,6,5,5)	7,6	28,6	Contemporary	"Hometown Glory" - Adele	Eliminated
Michou & Elsa	28 (7,7,8,6)	7,9	35,9	Argentine Tango	"Promesses" - Bigflo & Oli	Safe
Aurélie & Adrien	26 (7,6,7,6)	7,5	33,5	Quickstep	"La Seine" - Vanessa Paradis & Matthieu Chedid	Bottom three
Gérémy & Candice	31 (8,8,7,8)	8,9	39,9	Contemporary	"Quand Je Marche" - Ben Mazué	Safe
Tayc & Fauve	33 (9,8,7,9)	9,2	42,2	Jive	"Blinding Lights" - The Weeknd	Safe
Dita & Christophe	31 (9,7,7,8)	8,2	39,2	Quickstep	"Lollipop" - Mika	Bottom three
Bilal & Jordan	31 (9,7,8,7)	8,9	39,9	Rumba	"No Me Dejes" - Paloma Pradal	Safe
Face to Face
Lucie & Anthony	Eliminated			Cha-Cha-Cha	"One Last Time" - Ariana Grande	
Aurélie & Adrien	Saved by the public			Cha-Cha-Cha	"One Last Time" - Ariana Grande	
Dita & Christophe	Saved by the jury			Cha-Cha-Cha	"One Last Time" - Ariana Grande	

=== Week 8 ===
Individual judges scores in the chart below (given in parentheses) appeared in this order from left to right: Jean-Paul Gaultier, Denitsa Ikonomova, François Alu, Chris Marques.

Dita could not dance for this prime so, for her duo with Gérémy & Candice, her & Christophe were replaced by Terence Telle (semi-finalist of the 9th season) & Inès Vandamme

Running order

Couple	Score	Style	Music	Result
Aurélie & Adrien	29 (9,7,7,6)	Contemporary	VersuS - Vitaa & Slimane	Safe
Tayc & Fauve	36 (9,9,9,9)	Quickstep	"I Need You" - Jon Batiste	Safe
Gérémy & Candice	23 (7,5,6,5)	Quickstep	Les Limites - Julien Doré	Eliminated
Dita & Christophe	/	/	/	/
Michou & Elsa	31 (8,8,7,8)	American Smooth	Don't Stop Believin' - Journey	Bottom three
Bilal & Jordan	31 (9,7,7,8)	Cha-Cha-Cha	Rain On Me - Lady Gaga & Ariana Grande	Bottom three
Duos
Aurélie & Adrien	32 (8,8,8,8)	Paso Doble	Smoke On The Water - Deep Purple	61
Tayc & Fauve	32 (8,8,8,8)	Paso Doble	Smoke On The Water - Deep Purple	68
Gérémy & Candice	25 (7,6,6,6)	Contemporary	Mesdames - Grand Corps Malade	48
Terence & Inès	25 (7,6,6,6)	Contemporary	Mesdames - Grand Corps Malade	/
Michou & Elsa	27 (9,6,6,6)	Charleston	Around The World - Daft Punk	58
Bilal & Jordan	27 (9,6,6,6)	Charleston	Around The World - Daft Punk	58
Face To Face
Gérémy & Candice	Eliminated	Jive	Let's Love - David Guetta & Sia	
Michou & Elsa	Saved by the public	Jive	Let's Love - David Guetta & Sia	
Bilal & Jordan	Saved by the jury	Jive	Let's Love - David Guetta & Sia	

=== Week 9 ===
Individual judges scores in the chart below (given in parentheses) appeared in this order from left to right: Jean-Paul Gaultier, Denitsa Ikonomova, François Alu, Chris Marques.

The bottom 2 of the 1st round according to the judges are directly sent in face-to-face without performing their 2nd routine.

The last of the 2nd round according to the judges is sent in face to face too.

Running order

Couple	Score	Total	Style	Music	Result
Tayc & Fauve	37 (9,9,10,9)	71	Cha-Cha-Cha	Wanna Be Startin' Somethin' - Michael Jackson	Safe
Tayc & Fauve	34 (9,8,8,9)	71	Waltz	Next To Me - Imagine Dragons	Safe
Aurélie & Adrien	27 (8,7,6,6)	27	American Smooth	Never Enough - Loren Allred	Bottom three
Aurélie & Adrien	/	27	Samba	Jeune Demoiselle - Diam's	Bottom three
Michou & Elsa	29 (8,7,7,7)	29	Contemporary	Pas Beaux - Vitaa & Slimane	Bottom three
Michou & Elsa	/	29	Paso Doble	Ma Direction - Sexion D'Assaut	Bottom three
Dita & Christophe	31 (9,7,7,8)	63	Samba	Levitating - Dua Lipa	Eliminated
Dita & Christophe	32 (10,8,7,7)	63	Jive	J'Irai Où Tu Iras - Céline Dion & Jean-Jacques Goldman	Eliminated
Bilal & Jordan	37 (10,10,8,9)	74	Contemporary	Kid - Eddy de Pretto	Safe
Bilal & Jordan	37 (10,9,9,9)	74	Paso Doble	Hit the Road Jack - 2WEI	Safe
Face To Face
Aurélie & Adrien	Saved by the public		Tango	Beggin' - Måneskin	
Michou & Elsa	Saved by the public		Tango	Beggin' - Måneskin	
Dita & Christophe	Eliminated		Tango	Beggin' - Måneskin	

=== Week 10 : Semi final ===
Individual judges scores in the chart below (given in parentheses) appeared in this order from left to right: Jean-Paul Gaultier, Denitsa Ikonomova, François Alu, Chris Marques.

The best of the first round qualify directly for the final without performing its second routine.

The best of the second round qualify too.

The public choose the last finalist by the face-to-face.

Running order

Couple	Score	Total	Style	Music	Result
Aurélie & Adrien	30 (9,7,7,7)	56	Argentine Tango	Le dernier jour du disco - Juliette Armanet	Eliminated
Aurélie & Adrien	26 (8,6,7,5)	56	Cha-Cha-Cha	Don't Start Now - Dua Lipa	Eliminated
Tayc & Fauve	37 (9,10,9,9)	37	Contemporary	N’insiste pas - Camille Lellouche	Safe
Tayc & Fauve	/	37	Argentine Tango	/	Safe
Michou & Elsa	28 (9,7,6,6)	60	Foxtrot	Parce que c’est toi - Vianney & Mentissa Aziza	Bottom 2
Michou & Elsa	32 (10,7,7,8)	60	Samba	Mon soleil - Dadju	Bottom 2
Bilal & Jordan	35 (10,8,8,9)	70	Samba	Hey Mama - Black Eyed Peas	Safe
Bilal & Jordan	35 (10,8,8,9)	70	American Smooth	Creep - Radiohead	Safe
Face To Face
Aurélie & Adrien	Eliminated		Paso Doble	Seven Nation Army - The White Stripes	
Michou & Elsa	Saved by the public		Paso Doble	Seven Nation Army - The White Stripes	

=== Week 11 : Final ===
Individual judges scores in the chart below (given in parentheses) appeared in this order from left to right: Jean-Paul Gaultier, Denitsa Ikonomova, François Alu, Chris Marques.

The last of the first dances is directly eliminated without performing its second routine.

Michou & Elsa should have redone their rumba of the 6th week.

The two last dances were not noted but the judges choose their favorite dance.

For the last dance, all judges (except François Alu) choose Bilal.

Running order

Couple	Score	Style	Music	Result
Tayc & Fauve	40 (10,10,10,10)	Freestyle	Shallow - Ndlovu Youth Choir	Winner
Tayc & Fauve	Jean-Paul Gaultier / Denitsa Ikonomova / François Alu / Chris Marques	Samba	Magenta Riddim - DJ Snake	Winner
Michou & Elsa	32 (8,8,8,8)	Freestyle	Grand bain - Ninho	3rd Place
Michou & Elsa	N/A	N/A	N/A	3rd Place
Bilal & Jordan	39 (10,10,9,10)	Freestyle	Rise Up - Andra Day	Runner-Up
Bilal & Jordan	/	Waltz	Et Bam - Mentissa Aziza	Runner-Up
The Last Dance
Tayc & Fauve	56%	Contemporary	Formidable - Stromae	
Bilal & Jordan	44%	Contemporary	Courage to Change - Sia	

== Dance schedule ==
The celebrities and professional partners danced one of these routines for each corresponding week.

- Week 1: Argentine Tango, Samba, Contemporary, Tango, Quickstep, Paso Doble & Cha-Cha-Cha
- Week 2: Argentine Tango, Samba, Cha-Cha-Cha, Waltz, Foxtrot & Paso Doble
- Week 3: Waltz, Rumba, Contemporary, Cha-Cha-Cha, Jive, American Smooth, Argentine Tango
- Week 4: American Smooth, Samba, Quickstep, Cha-Cha-Cha, Jive, Rumba, Tango & Argentine Tango
- Week 5: Contemporary, Argentine Tango, Cha-Cha-Cha, Rumba, Paso Doble, Jazz Broadway, Quickstep, American Smooth
- Week 6: Waltz, Paso Doble, Salsa, Rumba, Quickstep, American Smooth
- Week 7: Contemporary, Argentine Tango, Quickstep, Jive, Rumba
- Week 8: Contemporary, Quickstep, American Smooth, Cha-Cha-Cha, Paso Doble, Charleston
- Week 9: Cha-Cha-Cha, American Smooth, Contemporary, Samba, Waltz, Jive & Paso Doble
- Week 10: Argentine Tango, Contemporary, Foxtrot, Samba, Cha-Cha-Cha & American Smooth
- Week 11: Freestyle, Samba, Waltz, Contemporary

== Dance Chart ==
Couple	1		2		3		4	5		6	7	8		9		10		11		
Tayc & Fauve	-	-	Samba	-	Rumba	Quickstep	American Smooth	Contemporary	Jive	Paso Doble	Jive	Quickstep	Paso Doble	Cha-Cha-Cha	Waltz	Contemporary	-	Freestyle	Samba	Contemporary
Bilal & Jordan	Contemporary	-	-	-	Jive	-	Tango	American Smooth	-	Quickstep	Rumba	Cha-Cha-Cha	Charleston	Contemporary	Paso Doble	Samba	American Smooth	Freestyle	Waltz	Contemporary
Michou & Elsa	-	-	Foxtrot	Paso Doble	Jive	Quickstep	Quickstep	Cha-Cha-Cha	-	Rumba	Argentine Tango	American Smooth	Charleston	Contemporary	-	Foxtrot	Samba	Freestyle		
Aurélie & Adrien	-	-	Argentine Tango	Paso Doble	Rumba	Quickstep	Jive	Paso Doble	Jive	Waltz	Quickstep	Contemporary	Paso Doble	American Smooth	-	Argentine Tango	Cha-Cha-Cha			
Dita & Christophe	-	-	Argentine Tango	-	Cha-Cha-Cha	Quickstep	Rumba	Jazz Broadway	Jive	Paso Doble	Quickstep	-	-	Samba	Jive					
Gérémy & Candice	-	-	Waltz	Paso Doble	Argentine Tango	Quickstep	Rumba	Cha-Cha-Cha	-	American Smooth	Contemporary	Quickstep	Contemporary							
Lucie & Anthony	Argentine Tango	Cha-Cha-Cha	-	-	Waltz	Quickstep	Samba	Rumba	-	Salsa	Contemporary									
Wejdene & Samuel	Samba	Cha-Cha-Cha	-	-	American Smooth	Quickstep	Argentine Tango	Quickstep	Jive	Rumba										
Vaimalama & Christian	-	-	Cha-Cha-Cha	-	Rumba & Contemporary	Quickstep	Quickstep	Argentine Tango	Jive											
Jean-Baptiste & Inès	Contemporary & Tango	Cha-Cha-Cha	-	-	Waltz	-	Cha-Cha-Cha													
Moussa & Coralie	Paso Doble	Cha-Cha-Cha	-	-	Cha-Cha-Cha	Quickstep														
Lola & Joël	-	-	Cha-Cha-Cha	Paso Doble																
Lââm & Maxime	Quickstep	-																		

Highest scoring dance
Lowest scoring dance
Danced, but not scored

== Around the Show ==
=== Host ===
Camille Combal returns as the host of the show for the third year.

=== Jury ===
Chris Marques returns as the only remaining judge from previous seasons. Denitsa Ikonomova, formerly a dancer on the show, replaces Shy'm. Patrick Dupond died in March 2021 and is replaced by a Paris Opera dancer. The fourth judge is iconic fashion designer Jean Paul Gaultier.

=== Dancers ===
Professional dancers Katrina Patchett & Christian Millette will not return. Denitsa Ikonomova, a four-time winner, replaces Shy'm who is not returning as judge.

In addition, professional dancer Emmanuelle Berne will not return and Jordan Mouillerac come back after being absent from season 10 and five new dancers will make their debut in this season: Coralie Licata (the wife of the professional dancer Christophe Licata), Adrien Caby, Elsa Bois, Joël Luzolo and Samuel Texier.

Finally, on 17 September, we learned that Christian Millette will finally participate.

=== Contestants ===
The cast was revealed on July 6, 2021.
