= Planet Raptor =

- DVD cover
- Written by: Steve Latshaw
- Directed by: Gary Jones
- Starring: Steven Bauer; Vanessa Angel; Ted Raimi; Musetta Vander
- Countries of origin: United States; United Kingdom; Romania
- Original language: English

Production
- Running time: 87 minutes
- Production company: Apollo Media

Original release
- Network: Syfy
- Release: August 8, 2007

Planet Raptor is a 2007 science-fiction horror made-for-television film directed by Gary Jones and starring Steven Bauer. It was entirely filmed in Romania. The film premiered in the United States on 25 January 2009 but was previously released on DVD in Brazil and Japan.

== Alternate titles ==
The film is also known as Raptor Planet 2, Raptor Island 2: Raptor Planet, Jurassic Planet.

== Plot ==
In 2066, the planet is entirely occupied by raptors. The only hope for the human race is a group of marines.

== Cast ==
- Steven Bauer as Captain Mace Carter
- Vanessa Angel as Dr. Anna Rogers
- Ted Raimi as Tygoon
- Musetta Vander as Sergeant Jacqueline Moore
- Peter Jason as "Pappy"

== See also ==
- List of films featuring dinosaurs
