= Clem (TV series) =

French television series

- Genre: Comedy drama
- Created by: Emmanuelle Rey-Magnan; Pascal Fontanille
- Developed by: TF1; Merlin production
- Written by: Pascal Fontanille; Emmanuelle Rey-Magnan
- Directed by: Joyce Buñuel
- Starring: Lucie Lucas; Victoria Abril; Jade Pradin; Élodie Fontan
- Theme music composer: Fabien Nataf
- Country of origin: France
- Original language: French
- No. of seasons: 10
- No. of episodes: 57 (list of episodes)

Production
- Cinematography: Thierry Schwartz

Original release
- Network: TF1
- Release: February 22, 2010

Clem is a French television series on TF1. It was created by Emmanuelle Rey Magnan and Pascal Fontanille, and directed by Joyce Buñuel and Éric Leroux.

== Synopsis ==
Clem retraces the life of a young teenage girl, Clementine, and mom at sixteen, in the heart of tensions between her parents and Julien, her son Valentin's father. It includes the problems of teenage life and that of a mother with a strong personality.

== Cast and characters ==
=== Main cast ===
- Lucie Lucas as Clémentine "Clem" Boissier (since season 1)
- Victoria Abril as Caroline "Caro" Boissier (season 1 to 8)
- Jean Dell as Michel Brimont (since season 1)
- Carole Richert as Marie-France Brimont (since season 1)
- Élodie Fontan as Alyzée (season 1 to 9)
- Kevin Elarbi as Hicham (since season 1)
- Benoît Michel as Jérôme (season 3 to 7)
- Philippe Lellouche as Xavier Ferran (season 5 to 8)
- Thomas Chomel as Valentin "Vava" Boissier-Brimont (since season 9)
- Léa Lopez as Salomé "Mémé" Boissier (season 6 to 9)

=== Former main cast ===
- Mathieu Spinosi as Julien Brimont, Valentin's father (season 1 to 4)
- Laurent Gamelon as Jean-Paul "JP" Boissier (season 2 to 5)
- Jérôme Anger as Jean-Paul Boissier (season 1 to 2)
- Jade Pradin as Salomé "Mémé" Boissier (season 1 to 5)
- Maria Laborit as Manie (season 1)
- Thomas Ancora as Paul (season 3 to 6)
- Louise Petit Damico as Anouchka Ferran (season 5 to 6)
- Rayane Bensetti as Dimitri Ferran (season 5 to 7)

==== Actors who played Valentin ====
- Diane and Robin Weiller (season 1)
- Marceau Cathelineau (season 1)
- Jules and Lucas Josso (season 2)
- Jean Daudigny (season 3)
- Thomas Moissonnier (season 3)
- Paul Monate (season 3 to 4)

=== Former high school characters ===
- Pierre Perrier as Mathieu (season 2)
- Arthur Mazet as Stanislas "Stan" (season 1 to 2)
- Emma Gamet as Gladys (season 1 to 2)
- Nina Ambard as Léna Ducovitch (season 1 to 2)
- Annie Grégorio as Mlle Lecoutre (season 1 to 2)
- Sandra Dorset as Delphine Roussel (season 4 to 5)

=== Recurring cast ===
- Agustín Galiana as Adrian Moron (since season 6)
- Annick Blancheteau as Solange (since season 2)
- Dominique Fouré as Mme Fliponot (since season 3)
- Ulysse Pillon as Martin (since season 3)
- Emmanuelle Bach as Vic (since season 3)
- Johanna Nizard as Sabine (since season 3)
- Sarah-Laure Estragnat as Sarah (since season 4)
- Isabelle Tanakil as Lila (since season 4)
- Stefan Godin as Max (since season 5)
- Marie Arnaudy as Babeth (since season 5)
- Joyce Bibring as Marjorie (since season 5)
- Victor Meutelet as Lucas (since season 5)
- Laura Giudice as Laura (since season 5)

=== Former recurring cast ===
- Olivier Bénard as a teacher (season 1)
- Grégoire Bonnet as M. Dumas (season 1 to 4)
- Arnaud Binard as Bruno (season 1 to 2)
- Camille Chamoux as Valérie (season 1 to 3)
- Claudia Tagbo as the day care's director (season 2)
- Pierre Santini as Jean-Jacques Boissier (season 2 to 4)
- Émilie Gavois-Kahn as Lily Barneron (season 2 to 4)

== Episodes ==
=== Season 1 (2010-2011) ===
1. Maman trop tôt (1)
2. Bienvenue à Valentin ! (2)
3. Vive les vacances ! (3)
4. C'est la rentrée ! (4)

=== Season 2 (2012) ===
1. La famille c'est sacré ! (5)
2. La mutation (6)
3. La guerre des familles (7)

=== Season 3 (2013) ===
1. Un de plus chez les Boissier (8)
2. Maman a craqué (9)
3. Haut les cœurs ! (10)

=== Season 4 (2014) ===
1. N'aie pas peur petite sœur (11)
2. Allez maman, t'es la meilleure ! (12)
3. Quand maman dérape (13)
4. Rendez-moi ma fille (14)
5. Ma femme, sa sœur et moi (15)

=== Season 5 (2015) ===
1. Quand maman dit stop ! (16)
2. Comment lui dire adieu ? (17)
3. Jamais sans mes filles ! (18)
4. C'est pas gagné ! (19)
5. Ça y est, je marie ma fille ! (20)

=== Season 6 (2016) ===
1. ¡ Hola mamá ! (21)
2. Les risques du métier (22)
3. Comment ne pas douter ? (23)
4. ¡ Mátame ! (24)
5. Une femme de trop (25)

=== Season 7 (2017) ===
1. Dimi en danger : partie 1 (26)
2. Dimi en danger : partie 2 (27)
3. Nous nous sommes tant aimés : partie 1 (28)
4. Nous nous sommes tant aimés : partie 2 (29)
5. ¡ Holà papà !: partie 1 (30)
6. ¡ Holà papà ! : partie 2 (31)
7. Maman, où t'es ? : partie 1 (32)
8. Maman, où t'es ? : partie 2 (33)
9. Ma belle-mère s'appelle Clem: Partie 1 (34)
10. Ma belle-mère s'appelle Clem: Partie 2 (35)

=== Season 8 (2018) ===
1. Nouveau départ (36)
2. Tout pour ma fille (37)
3. Où est ton père? (38)
4. Paso doble (39)
5. Révolution (40)
6. Question de choix (41)
7. L'art d'être papa (42)
8. Secrets de famille (43)
9. S'il suffisait qu'on s'aime... (44)
10. Avec ou sans toi! (45)

=== Season 9 (2019) ===
1. Du Fait de Ton Absence (46)
2. Maman (47)
3. Mon Monde S'Écroule (48)
4. Je Vais Me Battre (49)
5. Garder la Foi (50)
6. En Mémoire de Ton Sourire (51)

=== Season 10 (2020) ===
1. Je Suis Là (52)
2. Mon Amour (53)
3. Je Ne Lâcherai Pas (54)
4. Ma Bataille (55)
5. Pour la Vérité (56)
6. Pour Te Sauver (57)

== See also ==
- List of French television series
