= Musetta Vander =

South African actress (born 1963)

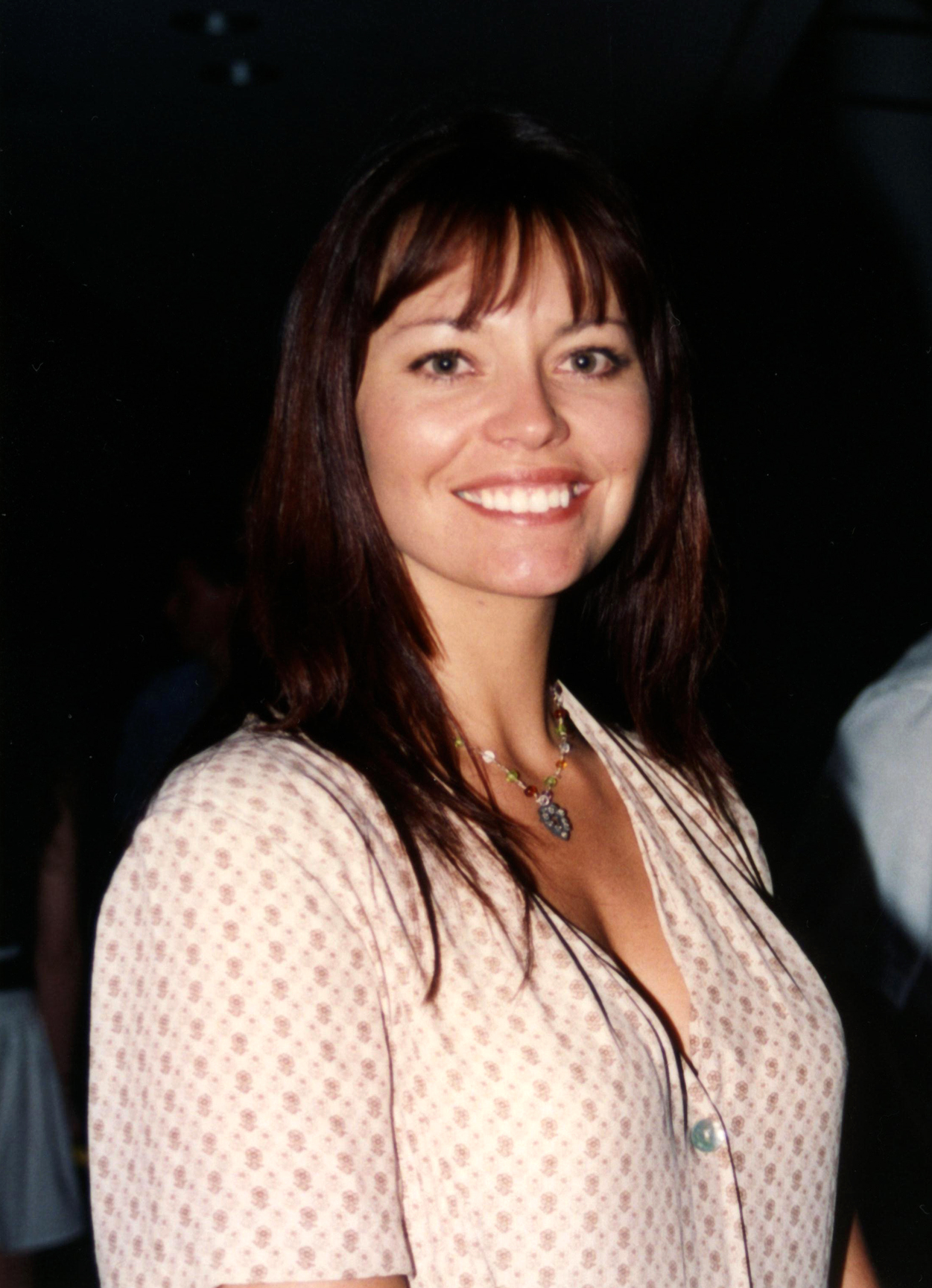
- Musetta Vander (age 33; 1996).
- Born: Musetta van der Merwe; 26 May 1963 (age 63); Durban, South Africa
- Education: Rand Afrikaans University (BA)
- Occupation: Actress
- Years active: 1986–present
- Known for: Wild Wild West; Super Force; Mortal Kombat Annihilation; Buffy the Vampire Slayer; Teacher's Pet; Star Trek: Voyager
- Spouse(s): Jeff Celentano (1988-2016) (divorced)} Jurg Human (2018)
- Website: musettavander.com

Musetta Vander (born Musetta van der Merwe; 26 May 1963) is a South African actress.

== Biography ==
In 1991, Vander landed her first notable role, portraying Zander Tyler in seven episodes of the action-adventure TV series Super Force.

In 1997, she portrayed Sindel in Mortal Kombat Annihilation (1997).

In 1998, Vander starred as Lady Elara, one of the lead characters in the video game Dune 2000. In 2002, she reprised her role for the sequel, Emperor: Battle for Dune.

Vander's theater credits include The Bourgeois Gentleman and Soweto's Burning.

Vander appeared in commercials, including those for Lancôme, Sanyo, McDonald's, Diet Coke, Mercedes, Heineken, and Skittles. She played Agent 24-7 for Prudential Real Estate.

Vander is featured in magazines, including a pictorial in Maxim.

In 1999, Vander had a supporting role in the Barry Sonnenfeld film Wild Wild West (1999), portraying an assistant to Kenneth Branagh's character, Dr. Loveless.

In 2000, Vander played a seductive 'Siren' in O Brother, Where Art Thou? (2000). That year, she also had a role in The Cell (2000), alongside Jennifer Lopez.

Vander appeared in television programming, primarily science fiction and fantasy series, including Buffy the Vampire Slayer, Stargate SG-1, Star Trek: Voyager, Babylon 5, Xena: Warrior Princess, and Highlander: The Series. Her later TV credits include guest appearances on NCIS, Criminal Minds: Beyond Borders, and Hawaii Five-0.

Vander played the lead character's wife in the comedy Kicking & Screaming (2005), and co-starred in Say It in Russian (2007). She played the lead female character in the thriller Breaking Point (2009). She can also be seen in the spoof/comedy Transylmania (2009).

Vander starred in a Christian movie, Johnny (2010). She played the step-mother of Gattlin Griffith in the horror movie Under the Bed (2012).

== Filmography ==
=== Film ===
Year	Title	Role	Notes
1989	The Endangered	Christine Pickering	
1989	Crimes of Crimes	Sheri Cutler	
1989	The Revenger	Marissa	
1993	Monolith	Katya Pavlova	Direct-to-video
1994	I'll Do Anything	Dancer	Scene deleted
1994	Dickwad	Juicy	Short film
1994	Oblivion	Lash	
1995	Project Metalbeast	Debbie	
1995	The Secret Force	Nurse	
1995	Project Shadowchaser III	Rea Astov	Direct-to-video
1995	Under the Hula Moon	Maya Gundinger	
1996	The Lord Protector: The Riddle of the Chosen	Lady Beryl	
1996	Oblivion 2: Backlash	Lash	
1997	American Hero	Gipsy	Shot in 1995, cancelled in 1997, and finally released in 2021.
1997	Elissa	Elissa	Short film
1997	Mortal Kombat Annihilation	Sindel	
1998	Gunshy	Grace	
1999	Molly	Maxine	
1999	Wild Wild West	Munitia	
2000	O Brother, Where Art Thou?	Siren	
2000	The Cell	Ella Baines	
2004	Forbidden Warrior	Reza	
2005	Mansquito	Dr. Jennifer Allen	TV movie
2005	Kicking & Screaming	Janice Weston	
2005	What's Up, Scarlet?	Sabrina Fisser	
2006	Spymate	Dr. Claudette Amour	
2006	Monster Night	Miss Morticia	Direct-to-video
2007	Say It in Russian	Natalia	
2007	Planet Raptor	Sgt. Jacqueline 'Jack' Moore	TV movie
2009	Transylmania	Teodora Van Sloan	
2009	Breaking Point	Celia Hernandez	
2009	Napoleonic	Dr. Barbara Hale	Short film
2010	Johnny	Julia Carter	
2012	Under the Bed	Angela Hausman	
2013	5 Hour Friends	Candy	
2014	Spreading Darkness	Harriet Skelp	
2015	The Better Half	Susan	
2015	$elfie Shootout	Agent Zoey Miller	
2017	The Hatred	Edna	
2017	Shine	Corrine Stacker	
2018	Meryl		(short) (voice)
2023	Deadly Draw	Zazie Zuiderkerk	
2024	The Uncivil War: America Divided	Beth	
2024	Mommy	Doris	(short)

=== Television ===
Year	Title	Role	Notes
1991–92	Super Force	Zander Tyler	Recurring role (7 episodes)
1994	Murder, She Wrote	Sharain Hourani	Episode: "The Dying Game"
1995	Boy Meets World	Dominique	Episode: "Breaking Up Is Really, Really Hard to Do"
1996	Diagnosis: Murder	Carrie	Episode: "Murder by the Book"
1996	Viper	KGB Agent Natalya Marakova	Episode: "MIG-89"
1997	Highlander	Ingrid Henning	Episode: "The Valkyrie"
1997	Buffy the Vampire Slayer	Natalie French/The She-Mantis	Episode: "Teacher's Pet"
1997	Babylon 5	Felicia	Episode: "Between the Darkness and the Light"
1997	Pensacola: Wings of Gold	Elina Zulinova	Episode: "Road Warriors"
1998	The Sentinel	Lila	Episode: "Love Kills"
1998	Soldier of Fortune, Inc.	Kasima Fada	Episode: "Top Event"
1999	Star Trek: Voyager	Derran Tal	Episode: "The Disease"
2000	Pensacola: Wings of Gold	Captain Jill 'Blaze' Trevera	Episode: "Pensacola Shootout"
2000	Xena: Warrior Princess	Ilainus	Episode: "Amphipolis Under Siege"
2000	Secret Agent Man	Prima	Recurring role (3 episodes)
2000	Stargate SG-1	Shan'auc	Episode: "Crossroads"
2001	V.I.P.	Alex Quaid	Episode: "Val's Big Bang"
2002	Son of the Beach	Nutragena	Episode: "Hamm Stroker's Suck My Blood"
2003	Stargate SG-1	Shan'auc	Episode: "The Changeling"
2003	She Spies	Dr. Weiland	Episode: "Damsels in De-Stress"
2003	Frasier	Natalie Blanc	Episode: "High Holidays"
2004	The Bold and the Beautiful	Princess Guinevere	1 episode
2010	NCIS	Julie Merriweather	Episode: "Broken Arrow"
2016	Criminal Minds: Beyond Borders	Miriam Nell	Episode: "Iqiniso"
2016	Swedish Dicks	Jennifer	Episode #1.4
2017	Hawaii Five-0	Sheriff Alana Smith	Episode "Ka Pa'ani Nui/Big Game"

=== Other works ===
Year	Title	Role	Notes
1989	Soweto's Burning	Emma	Theatre
1989	Terry Lin – "Let's Get Busy"	Dancer	Music video
1989	Alice Cooper – "Bed of Nails"	Dancer	Music video
1989	Cats in Boots – "Shotgun Sally"	Dancer/Model	Music video
1989	Paul Carrack – "I Live By the Groove"	Model	Music video
1989	Rod Stewart – "This Old Heart of Mine"	Dancer/Model	Music video
1989	Tina Turner – "I Don't Wanna Lose You"	Model	Music video
1989	Elton John – "Healing Hands"	Model	Music video
1990	Joey B. Ellis – "Thought You Were the One for Me"	Dancer	Music video
1990	Traveling Wilburys – "Wilbury Twist"	Dancer	Music video
1990	King Swamp – "Wiseblood"	Model	Music video
1990	Terry Steele – "If I Told You Once"	Model	Music video
1990	Desiree Coleman – "Romance"	Model	Music video
1990	Debbie Gibson – "Anything Is Possible"	Model	Music video
1990	Colin James – "Keep on Lovin' Me Baby"	Model	Music video
1991	Amy Grant – "Every Heartbeat"	Model	Music video
1992	Rock Video Girls 2	Herself	Music videos collection
1992	It Came from the Desert	Fantasy Girl	Video game
1993	Voyeur	Chantal Pousette	Video game
1995	Chris Isaak – "Go Walking Down There"	Dancer	Music video
1995	American Hero	Gipsy	Video game (unreleased)
1997	Movies, For Guys Who Like Movies	Herself/Guest	TBS program
1998	Dune 2000	Lady Elara	Video game
1999	Loveless' Ladies	Herself	Documentary featured on the DVD for Wild Wild West
2002	Emperor: Battle for Dune	Lady Elara	Video game
2003	Le Bourgeois gentilhomme	Countess Dorimene	Theatre
2005	Making of "Mosquito Man"	Herself	Documentary featured on the DVD for Mansquito
2005	Kicking & Screaming: Behind the Net	Herself	Documentary featured on the DVD for Kicking & Screaming
2006	Behind the scenes of '"Spymate"	Herself	Documentary featured on the DVD for Spymate
2007	Prudential Real Estate	Agent 24/7	Commercial
2007	Yoplait	Model	Commercial
2009	Live From the Future	Herself/Guest	Talk show
2017	DSW The Daughter Situation	Mother	Commercial
2017	Amazon Echo	Actress	Commercial
2017	Rhofade - Less Red and More You	Actress	Commercial

== Radio and podcasts ==
- Vander appeared on Ken Reid's TV Guidance Counselor podcast on 31 August 2016.
