= Thomas Ancora =

Belgian actor and screenwriter

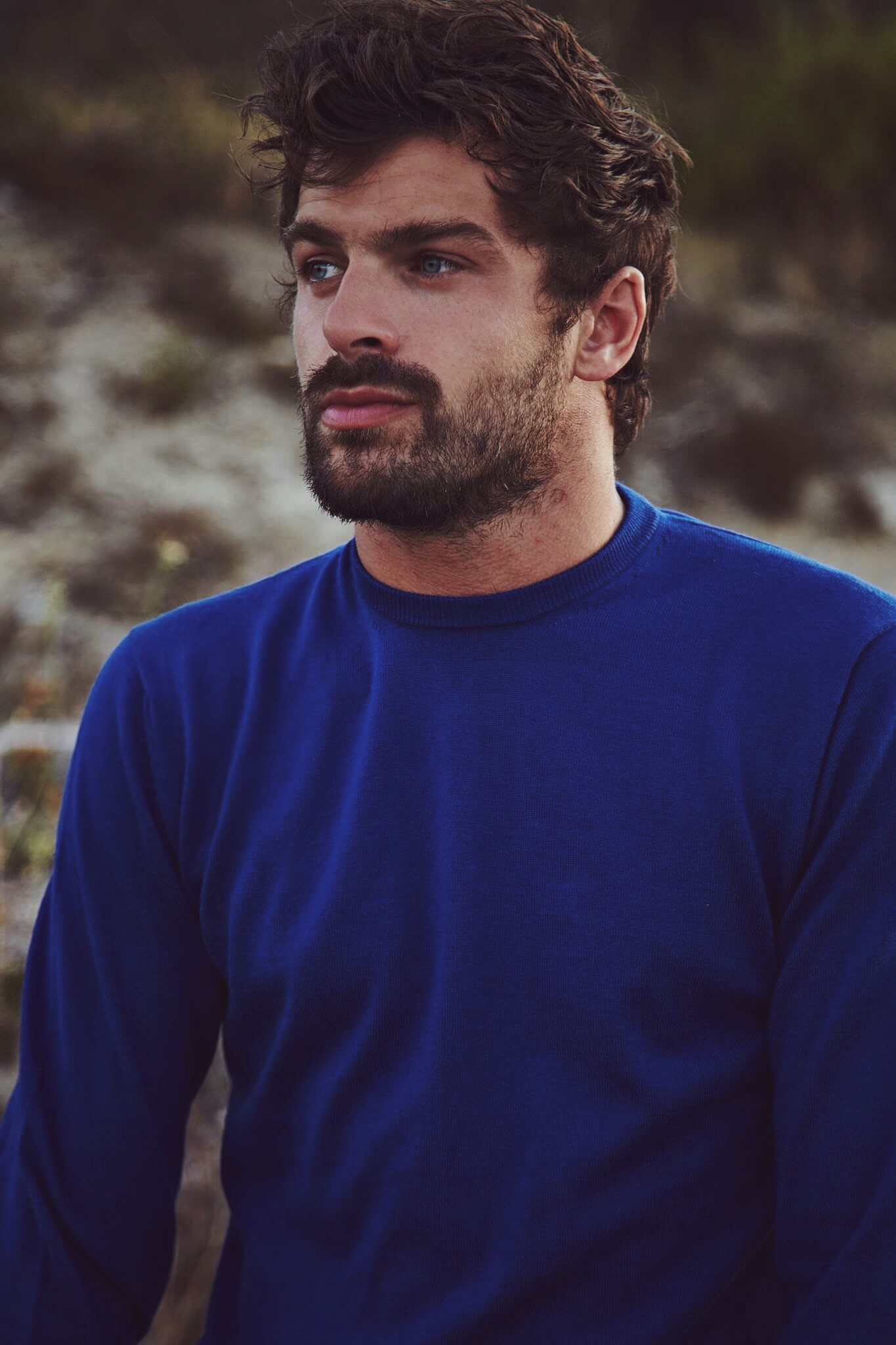
- Born: Thomas Quagliara Ancora; 20 July 1986 (age 39); Frameries, Belgium
- Occupations: Actor, Director, Screenwriter, TV presenter
- Years active: 2004–present

Thomas Ancora (born 20 July 1986 as Thomas Quagliara Ancora) is a Belgian actor, movie director and script screenwriter appearing in films, television and on stage. He has also been a TV/Radio host and presented radio and television shows for various Belgian stations (Club RTL, Plug RTL et RTL TVI) between 2006 and 2011. He is represented by the French agency VMA.

== Life and career ==
Ancora started acting classes at the age of 8 and was spotted by a modeling agency New Models when he was 15. Two years later, he got his first big role with the French TV show Ma terminale where he played role of "Kevin". The show aired in 2004 on M6 and Plug RTL. His cinema debuted in 2006, with Mes copines, followed by the Disney television series Tom et Nancy airing on Club RTL (Belgium) for three seasons. After a few short movies, guest appearances in TV shows (Clash, Le Kot, Strictement platonique), films (Sans laisser de traces, Nuit blanche, Ludo, The Fifth Estate), webseries (Ce que disent les Bruxellois, Les JOC that he created and directed) and appearances at the Magritte du cinéma award ceremonies followed. He is currently on the French TV show Clem where he plays "Paul" since season 3.

In 2017, he joins the cast of the mini TV series "La guerre des as" on Arte to portray WW1 hero Mick Mannock and the French TV series "Remember", next to Marie Gillain.

Ancora also started writing a few years ago. After doing a few webseries and videos for the Les magritte du cinéma, he wrote the movie "Losers Revolution" (that he co directed with Grégory Béghin in 2019) where he played next to Clément Manuel, Kody Kim, Bapstiste Sornin and Tania Garbarski. His second feature film, "The Crimson Order" will come out in Belgium on November 4th 2026.

== Filmography ==
=== Actor ===
Cinema

- 2006: Girlfriends by Sylvie Ayme
- 2007: Memory of Power, short by Angie Russo
- 2010: Sans laisser de traces by Grégoire Vigneron
- 2010: Fais ton choix, short film by Stéphane Henocque
- 2011: Nuit blanche, English title Sleepless Night by Frédéric Jardin
- 2011: Le Couloir, short film by Adrien François
- 2013: Ludo by Khourban Cassam-Chenaï
- 2013: The Fifth Estate by Bill Condon
- 2014: Insoupçonnable short film by Sidney Van Wichelen
- 2015: Made in Belgium by Hugues Hausman
- 2015: Une Nuit (One Night) by Alexandra Billington
- 2017: Where hands touch by Amma Asante
- 2018: Budapest by Xavier Gens
- 2020: Losers Revolution
- 2021: L'employée du mois
- 2021: Summit fever
- 2026: The Crimson Order

Television

- 2004: Ma terminale as Kevin - (season 1, M6)
- 2006–2009 : Tom et Nancy as Tom - (three seasons, Club RTL)
- 2010: Strictement platonique as Taddeo (France 2)
- 2010: Le Kot (MTV)
- 2011: Aspra balonia - in Greek: Άσπρα Μπαλόνια (Sigma)
- 2012: Clash as Juan (France 2)
- 2012-2016: Clem as Paul (TF1)
- 2013: Ce que disent les gens du cinéma belge (video aired during the Magritte du cinéma) - Be TV
- 2014: I'm Gonna get a Magritte (Music Video aired during Magritte du cinéma) - Be TV
- 2015: Ainsi soient-ils (Season 3) - Arte
- 2017: La forêt (Season 1) - France 3
- 2017: Souviens toi (Season 1) - M6
- 2018: Papa ou maman - M6
- 2018: La guerre des as as Edward Mannock - Arte
- 2021: Baraki as Bernard Pirotte - RTBF
- 2021: Familie as Stieg - VRT
- 2022: 1985 as Marcel Barbier - RTBF VRT
- 2025: NCIS: Tony and Ziva

Theatre

- 2003: Jeux de massacre by Eugène Ionesco
- 2009: Le Misanthrope by Molière, Director: Fabrice Cecchi
- 2010: Les Coucous by Guy Grosso and Michel Modo, Director: Jean-Paul Andret
- 2011: Treize à table by Marc-Gilbert Sauvajon, Director: Jean-Paul Andret

Web

- 2012 - 2013 : Ce que dissent les Bruxellois
- 2012 : Les JOC
- 2015 : Arrête ton cinéma!

=== Scenarist ===
- 2012: Ce que disent les Bruxellois (web-série)
- 2013: "Ce que disent les gens du cinéma belge" (vidéo diffusée lors de la cérémonie des Magritte du cinéma )
- 2014: "I'm Gonna get a Magritte" (Music video aired during the "Magritte du cinéma" )
- 2015 : Arrête ton cinéma!
- 2020: Losers Revolution
- 2026: The Crimson Order
- 2027: Hot Dads Murder Club (in development)

=== Director ===
Cinema

- 2020: Losers Revolution
- 2026: The Crimson Order
