= Ron Gilbert (actor) =

American film and television actor

- Born: Ronald Franklyn Goldstein; 1939 or 1940 (age 85–86); East Harlem, New York, U.S.
- Occupations: Film and television actor

Ronald Franklyn Goldstein (born 1939/1940) is an American film and television actor. He is best known for playing Daniel Metzheiser in the 1995 film The Usual Suspects.

== Life and career ==
Gilbert was born in East Harlem, New York. He served in the United States Army. He began his screen career in 1968, appearing in the ABC crime drama television series N.Y.P.D. In 1971, he played an uncredited role of a police officer in the film The Anderson Tapes.

Later in his career, Gilbert guest-starred in numerous television programs including The Rockford Files, Lou Grant, Ugly Betty, Desperate Housewives, Curb Your Enthusiasm, NYPD Blue, The X-Files, Father Dowling Mysteries and The Oldest Rookie. He also appeared in films such as The Usual Suspects (as Daniel Metzheiser), The Godfather, Black Is King, Dog Day Afternoon, What's Up, Scarlet? and Serpico.

Gilbert's most recent role was in the 2023 film Bora.
