= Lucie Lucas =

French actress

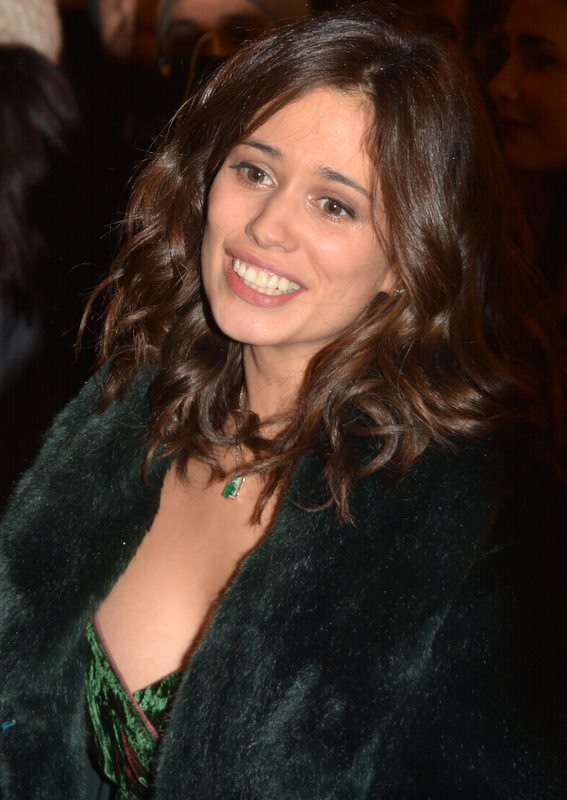
- Lucas in 2017
- Born: 24 March 1986 (age 39)
- Occupation: Actress
- Television: Clem

Lucie Lucas (born March 24, 1986) is a French actress. She is best known for being Clémentine Boissier in French TV Series Clem, alongside Victoria Abril.

== Early life ==
Lucas started taking acting classes at age 9. During her teenage years, she was part of a modeling agency.

== Career ==
Lucas's first role in a movie was 15 ans et demi in 2007.

She started on TV in 2009 with Les Petits Meurtres d'Agatha Christie and Femmes de loi.

In 2010, she got the main role, Clémentine Boissier, on in French TV Series Clem, a 16-year-old who gets pregnant. This was supposed to be a TV movie but with the success it had, producers decided to make it a TV series and since 2011, there is one season every year, at first composed of three episodes, and five since season 4.

In December 2013, she was amongst the celebrities appearing on a television special of TV series Nos chers voisins.

In 2021, she participated in season 11 of Danse avec les stars (the French version of Dancing with the Stars) with her partner Anthony Colette and finished in 7th place.

== Personal life ==
She met her future husband, Adrien, at the age of 13 in school, but they did not get together until they were 19 years old. They have three children, Lilou (born in August 2010), Moïra (born in January 2012) and Milo (born in March 2018). She lives in the countryside, in a small town in the east of Côtes-d'Armor, where she owns an ecological farm.

== Filmography ==
Year	Title	Role	Director	Notes
2008	15 ans et demi	Karine	François Desagnat & Thomas Sorriaux	
2009	Le missionnaire	Sarah	Roger Delattre	
2009	Un flic	Bimbo	Patrick Dewolf	TV series (1 episode)
2009	Femmes de loi	Charlotte Rohmer	Patrice Martineau	TV series (1 episode)
2009	Les Petits Meurtres d'Agatha Christie	Esther	Stéphane Kappes	TV series (1 episode)
2010	Le pigeon	Lucie Jourdain	Lorenzo Gabriele	TV movie
2010–2021	Clem	Clémentine Boissier	Joyce Buñuel, Stéphane Malhuret, ...	TV series (64 episodes)
2013	Nos chers voisins	Adeline	Gérard Pautonnier	TV series (1 episode)
2014	êMe	Lucie	Deborah Levi	Short
2015	Le secret d'Elise	Christelle Bordat	Alexandre Laurent	TV mini-series
2016	Porto	Mati Vargnier	Gabe Klinger	
2016	Coup de Foudre à Jaipur	Anne	Arnauld Mercadier	TV movie
2016	Nicolas Le Floch	Agnès Guinguet	Philippe Bérenger	TV series (1 episode)
2016	Murders on the Ile de Ré	Margaux Pelletier	François Basset & Jules Maillard	TV series (1 episode)
2017	Si tu n'es pas là	Lucie	Pierre Ferrière	Short
2018	Les enfants du secret	Sabine Derrac	David Morlet	TV movie
2019	Amor Quântico	The Woman	Paulo Furtado	Short
2021	La petite femelle	Pauline Dubuisson	Philippe Faucon	TV movie
2021	Gloria	Emilie Gauvin	Julien Colonna	TV mini-series
