= A Patriot's Act =

2014 novel by Kenneth G. Eade

- First edition
- Author: Kenneth Eade
- Language: English
- Genre: Legal thriller
- Publisher: CreateSpace
- Publication date: 2014
- Publication place: United States
- Media type: Print (Ebook, Paperback)
- Pages: 341 pp
- ISBN: 978-1-68142-575-7

A Patriot's Act is a 2014 legal suspense thriller by Kenneth G. Eade. The novel is a fictional legal thriller and courtroom drama about a naturalized United States citizen who finds himself thrown into Guantanamo Bay Detention Camp as a suspected terrorist. The novel is critically acclaimed.

== Overview ==
This was Eade's third novel, and the second in his Brent Marks series of legal thrillers. The story takes place largely in Guantanamo Bay Detention Camp, in 2007–2008.

== Plot summary ==
Attorney Brent Marks fights for the rights of a naturalized American citizen who goes missing in Iraq, using its own Constitution to fight the behemoth U.S. government. Ahmed Khury, an accountant in California, falls under suspicion due to his association with his brother Sabeen, who is suspected of laundering money back in Iraq. Ahmed is placed in Guantanamo Bay Detention Camp, where he is tortured despite not having any information about terrorism to divulge. Corruption, a cover-up, and murder complicate the story, and even Brent Marks himself is in danger.

== Inspiration ==
Eade was inspired to write a fictional story which exposes the government's restriction of Constitutionally guaranteed rights in the name of the war on terror, by both the enactment of the USA PATRIOT ACT and the use of Guantanamo Bay detention camp as an offshore prison.

== Reception ==
Author and former Guantanamo guard Joseph Hickman said, "Not only is A Patriot's Act a gripping novel where the characters in the book come alive, Eade also gives a real life glimpse into Guantanamo Bay, and the conditions inside the detainee camps. Throughout the book you see and feel through his characters what the detainees at Guantanamo go through, and the never ending hurdles the attorneys have to overcome to represent them. This book is required reading for anyone who cares about liberty and justice."

InD'tale Magazine said, "Mr. Eade takes a truly realistic look into the atrocities that occurred at Guantanamo Bay in the act of patriotism and protecting the freedom of Americans. The reality is not pretty. The story being told is a powerful look into the inner workings of a twisted government machine. Brent Marks and Rick Penn are exceptional characters, supported by a cast of government officials that will make you smile or cringe. A Patriot's Act is an edge-of-your-seat thriller that could easily be transformed into a dramatic film. Simply riveting, start to finish!" InD'tale Magazine also nominated A Patriot's Act for its 2015 RONE Award in the Suspense category.

Midwest Book Review said, "It's all about delicate balance of power and experience — something gone awry in A Patriot's Act, and something explored through intimate descriptions. As Eade deftly juxtaposes the lives of two very different Americans experiencing two very different circumstances, he delves into the politics and processes of prisoners and military men alike, exposing the wounds of their experience and psyches and the points at which man's inhumanity stems from a worldview that dehumanizes and rips apart systems and people."
