= Teacher's Pet (Buffy the Vampire Slayer) =

- Buffy the Vampire Slayer episode
- Episode no.: Season 1 Episode 4
- Directed by: Bruce Seth Green
- Written by: David Greenwalt
- Production code: 4V04
- Original air date: March 24, 1997

Guest appearances
- Musetta Vander as Natalie French/The She-Mantis; William Monaghan as Dr. Gregory; David Boreanaz as Angel; Ken Lerner as Principal Flutie; Jackson Price as Blayne Moll; Jean Speegle Howard as real Natalie French

Episode chronology
← Previous "Witch"	Next → "Never Kill a Boy on the First Date"
- Buffy the Vampire Slayer season 1

"Teacher's Pet" is the fourth episode of the first season of the television series Buffy the Vampire Slayer. The episode originally aired on The WB on March 24, 1997, attracting 2.0 million viewers. The episode was written by co-executive producer David Greenwalt and directed by Bruce Seth Green

A substitute teacher's infatuation with Xander is flattering to the lovesick teen, but alarming to Buffy.

== Plot ==
One evening in the Bronze, Xander (Nicholas Brendon) saves Buffy (Sarah Michelle Gellar) from a menacing vampire. He then goes on stage to play his guitar solo, promising to later "kiss her like she has never been kissed before." In biology class, he is awakened from this dream when Buffy points out that he is drooling. The class is taught by Dr. Gregory, who calls on an unprepared Buffy to answer a question about insects. After class, Dr. Gregory encourages Buffy, telling her that she can excel in class if she makes an effort. Once alone, he is attacked by an unseen monster.

That night at the Bronze, fellow student Blayne taunts Xander about his lack of sexual prowess. When Buffy and Willow (Alyson Hannigan) arrive, Xander puts his arms around both girls to buff up his reputation. Buffy rushes over to Angel when she sees him standing in the corner. Angel gives her his leather jacket when he notices that she is cold. When Buffy sees several slashes on his arm, she jokes that someone must have attacked him with a big fork. He warns Buffy about the new threat, telling her not to let him corner her, as he'll rip her throat out. He quickly leaves after the warning.

The next day, Buffy informs Giles that Angel warned her about a "fork guy". The substitute biology teacher, Natalie French (Musetta Vander), shows up and turns every boy's head. She seems to be fascinated by insects, especially the praying mantis. French suggests making model egg sacs for the upcoming science fair and asks the class for help. At lunch, Cordelia (Charisma Carpenter) finds the headless body of Dr. Gregory in the cafeteria locker. In the library, Giles consoles a tearful Buffy. They try to figure out if there is a connection to the Master, but they don't rule out the possibility of a second monster.

Later that night, Buffy goes to a park frequented by the homeless and is attacked by "Claw", a vampire who has a large claw in place of his right hand. The fight is interrupted by the police, and the vampire flees. While in pursuit, Buffy sees him come up behind Ms. French, who turns to stare at him. To Buffy's surprise, Claw bolts in panic.

At school the next day, Buffy is sent to a counselor to help her get over seeing Dr. Gregory's dead body. This makes her late for the pop quiz that Miss French gives the class — a test where she tells Xander the answer to a question. Buffy arrives and looks through the class window. Sensing Buffy's presence, Miss French turns her head 180 degrees to look at her. After class, Miss French asks Xander to come to her house that evening to work on a project. After he leaves, she eats a sandwich made of live crickets.

Back in the library, Buffy convinces Giles and Willow that Ms. French must be a praying mantis. They discover that Blayne, who worked on a project with Ms. French the day before, never came home that night. Buffy tries to warn Xander, but he brushes her off, saying she is jealous. Before he walks off, he expresses his dislike for the name "Angel".

When Xander arrives at Ms. French's house, she greets him in a revealing dress and offers him a martini. The drink knocks him out as she transforms into a giant insect. Xander wakes up in a cage next to Blayne, who tells him how she mates like a praying mantis, biting off men's heads in the process.

In the library, the gang discovers that Ms. French is a She-Mantis who lures virgins for her mating ritual. Willow reveals Xander is a virgin, then calls his mother and learns that he never came home. They realize he's in great danger. Buffy tells Giles to record bat sonar — a sound that damages the insect's nervous system — while Ms. French chooses Xander as her next victim.

Buffy, Willow, and Giles arrive at the She-Mantis' registered address, where they find an old woman (Jean Speegle Howard) who is actually named Ms. French and has been retired from teaching since 1972. To quickly find Xander, Buffy tracks down Claw in the sewers, who can sense the She-Mantis. After they identify the right house, Claw attacks Buffy, but she quickly stakes him with a broken fence post. Buffy breaks through the window when the She-Mantis is about to mate with Xander. She slays the insect, using insect repellent and the bat sonar recording to weaken it. Xander then destroys the eggs in the house.

Later at the Bronze, Buffy sits at the bar wearing Angel's jacket when he approaches her. She offers to give it back, but he tells her to keep it as it looks better on her. As she watches him walk away, she is clearly smitten.

After science class, Buffy places Dr. Gregory's glasses in his jacket, which is still hanging in the classroom closet, oblivious to the eggs attached to the bottom of a shelf — or the fact that one is hatching.

== Cultural references ==
When describing Ms. French's head-turning abilities, Buffy references The Exorcist.

In the library, Willow's comment "inquiring minds want to know" is a reference to the slogan used by the tabloid newspaper National Enquirer.

== Broadcast and reception ==
"Teacher's Pet" was first broadcast on The WB on March 24, 1997. It pulled in an audience of 2 million households.

Vox ranked it at #132 on their "Every Episode Ranked From Worst to Best" list of all 144 episodes (to mark the 20th anniversary of the show), writing, "By 1997, the student/teacher love affair was already a well-worn teen soap trope, and "Teacher's Pet"'s twist of having the teacher be a literal predator is only mildly clever." However, "the core Scooby dynamics have really started to gel: The scene where Giles corrals the kids into researching the two monsters decapitating and shredding their way through Sunnydale ("Fork Guy doesn't do heads," Buffy notes) hits all the classic beats ... This is also the first episode to really show off the Buffy/Angel chemistry that will drive much of the next season."

Noel Murray of The A.V. Club gave the episode a grade of B. He wrote that the "fundamental goofiness" of the premise was a "strike against" the episode, but that it benefited from "depth of characterization". Murray commented that the episode's subtext was the teenage fear of the reproductive practicalities of sex. A BBC review said that the episode "struggles to tread new ground" and was "uncomfortably paced". However, the review praised the effects of the praying mantis and some "delightful moments". DVD Talk's Phillip Duncan was somewhat disappointed with the episode, calling it a "by-the-book monster thriller set in the high school". Despite the standardness, he felt that it was still "worth watching".

Rolling Stone ranked "Teachers Pet" at #140 on their "Every Episode Ranked From Worst to Best" list, calling Xander a "character who would often be the 'damsel in distress' figure," and writing that the episode "isn't anything to write home about though, with a passingly clever take on the teacher/student love affair, with the teacher here being quite literally a predator. It's OK, but "OK" is a running theme throughout much of Season One."

"Teacher's Pet" was ranked at #133 on Paste Magazine's "Every Episode Ranked" list and #123 on BuzzFeed's "Ranking Every Episode" list.
