= Agata Gotova =

Russian actress and screenwriter (born 1977)

- Born: October 14, 1977 (age 47); Moscow, Russia
- Occupation(s): Actress, screenwriter
- Years active: 1987–present

Agata Gotova (born October 14, 1977) is a Russian actress and screenwriter.

== Biography ==
Gotova began her career in the former Soviet Union at an early age. She performed as an extra in a television series called Budilnik (1987), which was similar to The Mickey Mouse Club. She then toured Europe with the renowned children's ensemble dance troupe, "Kalinka". In 1989, Gotova appeared on the poster for the film Kalinka.

She continued her acting career on stage as an understudy in the play Political Cabaret (by satirist Mikhail Jevanetsky) in the renowned Moscow Theater of Satire. Then, unexpectedly, Gotova decided to leave her acting career and move to Paris in order to study at the Sorbonne University. She completed her studies in Paris and moved to California on a fiancé visa. In Los Angeles, Gotova returned to acting. Her husband created two original television celebrity shows for her: Faces & Names and Autograph.

After a series of extra roles in big Hollywood films, Gotova landed the lead in a film called Say It in Russian, produced by her husband. She won the Best Actress Award at the Honolulu International Film Festival. After 14 years in California, Gotova returned to Europe. She currently resides in Beausoleil, France, next to the Principality of Monaco, where she worked as a broadcaster of a live show on Chik Radio in Monte Carlo. While at Chik, she conducted interviews with notable celebrities throughout the year, as well as during the Cannes Film Festival.

In 2013, she participated in organizing a large-scale international event—Matéo Mornar's exhibition during the first official visit of Prince Albert of Monaco to Moscow.

In 2015, she organized the joint performances of the Bolshoi Ballet and the Mariinsky Opera in Monaco.

Gotova continues to produce events throughout Europe and Russia.
