= Say It in Russian =

2007 film directed by Jeff Celentano

- Theatrical poster
- Directed by: Jeff Celentano
- Written by: Jeff Celentano; Kenneth G. Eade
- Produced by: Kenneth G. Eade; Mark A. Cifelli; Jefferson Richard
- Starring: Steven Brand; Rade Šerbedžija; Faye Dunaway; Musetta Vander; Alex Nesic; Steven Berkoff; Elya Baskin
- Music by: Pinar Toprak
- Distributed by: Dalton Pictures
- Release dates: 1 September 2007 (Venice Film Festival); 4 May 2009
- Countries: United States; France
- Language: English

Say it in Russian is a 2007 American/French film, co-written and produced by Kenneth G. Eade, and starring Rade Šerbedžija, Faye Dunaway and Steven Brand.

Say it in Russian is directed by Jeff Celentano, and edited by William M. Anderson and David Rawlins. It is produced by Imperia Entertainment, Inc. The motion picture was one of the first pictures ever successfully finished by a small cap company that trades its stock on the Pink Sheets. The movie has been picked up for distribution by Dalton Pictures and was released on 4 May 2009 in Carmike cinemas.

== Plot ==
Andrew (Steven Brand) meets a young Russian girl, Daria, while on vacation in Europe and falls in love. He goes to Moscow, where he meets Daria's father (Rade Šerbedžija), a rich Russian mafia oligarch, and becomes entwined with his situation, which places them both in grave danger.

== Cast ==
- Steven Brand as Andrew Lamont
- Rade Šerbedžija as Raf Larin
- Agata Gotova as Daria Larina
- Faye Dunaway as Jacqueline de Rossy
- Musetta Vander as Natalia
- Alex Nesic as Nikolai Petrenko
- Steven Berkoff as Oleg Rozhin
- Elya Baskin as Viktor
- Oleg Vidov as Drunk Russian Man
- Matt Baker as Bullfighter
- Anatoly Davydov as Anton Krylov
