= Gunshy =

1998 film by Jeff Celentano

- Directed by: Jeff Celentano
- Written by: Larry Gross
- Starring: William Petersen; Michael Wincott; Diane Lane; R. Lee Ermey; Meat Loaf
- Cinematography: John B. Aronson
- Edited by: Andy Horvitch
- Music by: Hal Lindes
- Production company: Periscope Pictures
- Release date: 1998
- Running time: 101 minutes
- Country: United States
- Language: English

Gunshy is a 1998 American crime drama film directed by Jeff Celentano and starring William Petersen, Michael Wincott, and Diane Lane.

== Plot ==
When New York journalist Jake Bridges catches his girlfriend cheating on him, he travels to Atlantic City to drink away his troubles. Jake is saved from a bar brawl by small-time mobster Frankie. Jake befriends Frankie and eventually falls in love with his girlfriend Melissa. Jake then joins Frankie in his money-collecting duties, beginning a path leading to violence, betrayal, and restitution.

== Cast ==
- William Petersen as Jake Bridges
- Michael Wincott as Frankie McGregor
- Diane Lane as Melissa
- R. Lee Ermey as Jerry
- Kevin Gage as Ward
- Michael Byrne as Lange
- Eric Schaeffer as Gwynne
- Meat Loaf as Lew Collins
- Musetta Vander as Grace
- John Fleck as Willis
- Badja Djola as Abel
- Benjamin Lum as Kwai
- Natalie Canerday as Jan
- David Herman as Dan
