= Jeff Celentano =

American actor (born 1960)

- Born: May 24, 1960 (age 65); Pemberton, New Jersey

Jeff Celentano (born May 24, 1960) is an American actor, screenwriter, producer, and film director. Celentano starred as an actor in such films as The Player, American Ninja 2: The Confrontation, Puppet Master II, and Demonic Toys.

In 1992, he turned to directing with his first short film, Dickwad. Which won several film festivals as best comedy short. Celentano was an acting teacher and the Executive Director of Drama at The Performer's Academy in Lake Forest, California.

== Filmography (director) ==
- 1994 – Dickwad
- 1995 – Under the Hula Moon
- 1998 – Gunshy
- 2000 – Primary Suspect
- 2004 – Moscow Heat
- 2007 – Say It in Russian
- 2009 – Breaking Point
- 2018 – Glass Jaw
- 2023 – The Hill
- 2024 - Blackwater Lane
