= Kenneth G. Eade =

American attorney and author

- Born: Kenneth Gordon Eade; December 29, 1957 (age 68); Los Angeles, California, U.S.
- Education: California State University, Northridge; Southwestern Law School
- Occupation: Writer
- Spouse: Valentina Eade (m. 2010)
- Writing career
- Period: 2012–present
- Genres: Legal thriller Crime fiction Espionage fiction
- Website: amazonsellers.attorney

Kenneth Gordon Eade (born December 29, 1957) is an American attorney, environmental and political activist, and author of political and legal thrillers.

== Early life and education ==
Kenneth Eade attended the Honors Program at El Camino Real High School, and attended classes at Los Angeles Pierce College at the age of 15. He graduated from California State University, Northridge with a B.A. in Liberal Studies in 1977, and received a J.D. Degree from Southwestern Law School in 1980. After graduating from Southwestern, he practiced civil and criminal law for about a decade, then went into business law with an emphasis on securities law, and civil litigation.

== Marriage and family ==
Kenneth Eade and photographer Valentina Eade were married on July 31, 2010, in Russia. They currently live in the South of France, where they give symposiums on the importance of bees to the environment.

=== Law and political activism ===
Eade practiced law for over thirty years, is known as an environmental and political activist, and has been quoted as an expert on genetically engineered foods, homeowners associations, and government.

In October 2014, Eade was suspended from practicing law before the U.S. Securities and Exchange Commission for a period of five years, following a consent order by stipulation in an enforcement action against him, relating to a gold company which was accused of misleading investors of the company's financials.

In 2013, after 3 decades of practicing law, Eade began publishing his novels, beginning with An Involuntary Spy, the fictional story of a whistleblower who goes on the run from authorities to warn the public of the dangers of genetically engineered foods, which critics have said has broken wide open the GMO controversy. The benchmark of Eade's novels is that they are based on current events that affect our daily lives. He has written eighteen novels which have been translated into four languages.

In 2017, Eade co-founded Amazon Sellers Attorney, a web-based consultation service that helps third-party sellers on Amazon (company) with issues related to the suspension of their seller accounts and listings, and currently serves as its supervising attorney and consultant.

=== Television and movies ===
In 2006, Eade produced and co-wrote the feature film, Say It in Russian, starring Faye Dunaway, Rade Sherbedzija and Steven Berkoff for which he obtained an avant-premiere at the Monte Carlo Television Festival and a limited theatrical release in 2008 in Carmike Cinemas in the United States. Say it in Russian won an award for Best Film in the 2008 Honolulu Film Festival,

== Bibliography ==
=== Novels ===
- An Involuntary Spy (2013) ISBN 978-1-492-90977-4
- Predatory Kill (2014) ISBN 978-1-494-98848-7
- A Patriot's Act (2014) ISBN 978-1-68142-575-7
- HOA Wire (2015) ISBN 978-1-507-86228-5
- To Russia for Love (2015) ISBN 978-1-512-28052-4
- Unreasonable Force (2015) ISBN 978-1-514-87000-6
- Killer.com (2015) ISBN 978-1-517-27720-8
- Absolute Intolerance (2015) ISBN 978-1-522-75220-2
- Terror on Wall Street (2015) ISBN 978-1-523-66325-5
- The Spy Files (2016) ISBN 978-1-530-53346-6
- Decree of Finality (2016) ISBN 978-1-533-12268-1
- Beyond All Recognition (2016) ISBN 978-1-535-09771-0
- Paladine (2016) ISBN 978-1-537-55404-4
- The Big Spill (2016) ISBN 978-1-539-42035-4
- Russian Holiday (2016) ISBN 978-1-541-17900-4

=== Non-fiction ===
- Bless the Bees:The Pending Extinction of our Pollinators and What You Can Do to Stop It ISBN 978-1-492-79416-5
- A Bee See: Who are Our Pollinators and Why are They in Trouble. ISBN 978-1-492-78743-3
