= List of One Day at a Time (2017 TV series) episodes =

One Day at a Time is an American sitcom loosely based on the 1975–1984 CBS series of the same name, developed as a Netflix original program and later airing on Pop TV. The series is written by Gloria Calderón Kellett and Mike Royce. Justina Machado, Todd Grinnell, Isabella Gómez, Marcel Ruiz, Stephen Tobolowsky, and Rita Moreno star in the series, with Pam Fryman directing the pilot episode. The first season, consisting of thirteen episodes, was released on January 6, 2017.

On March 4, 2017, the series was renewed by Netflix for a second season, which premiered on January 26, 2018. On March 26, 2018, a third season was ordered, which was released on February 8, 2019. On June 27, 2019, Pop TV commissioned a fourth season of the series, after Netflix canceled it in March 2019. The fourth season premiered on March 24, 2020, and was simulcast on Logo TV and TV Land. TV Land continued to simulcast the Pop TV-originated episodes throughout the fourth season.

During the course of the series, 46 episodes of One Day at a Time were released, concluding on June 16, 2020. On March 20, 2020 it was announced that production was suspended due to the COVID-19 pandemic, with the series continuing to air new episodes through April 28. The next day, plans were announced to make an animated special, further reported on May 14 as "The Politics Episode”. The episode premiered on June 16, 2020. In October 2020, reruns of all season 4 episodes, excluding the show's animated special "The Politics Episode," would air on CBS. On November 24, 2020, Pop canceled the series after the fourth season, but Sony Pictures TV will be shopping the series for other outlets. On December 8, 2020 it was announced that there would be no new episodes, officially cancelling the show for a third, and final, time.

== Series overview ==
Season	Episodes	Originally released		
Season	Episodes	First released	Last released	Network
1	13	January 6, 2017		Netflix
2	13	January 26, 2018		Netflix
3	13	February 8, 2019		Netflix
4	7	March 24, 2020	June 16, 2020	Pop TV

== Episodes ==
=== Season 1 (2017) ===
No. overall	No. in season	Title	Directed by	Written by	Original release date
1	1	"This Is It"	Pamela Fryman	Gloria Calderón Kellett & Mike Royce	January 6, 2017
Penelope returns home to find her daughter, Elena, arguing with her mother, Lydia, over a planned quinceañera after Elena reads that it has misogynistic roots. Penelope challenges Elena to a Lincoln–Douglas debate in which they argue the other's perspective, tricking her into arguing for the Quinces that she doesn't want. In protest, she fails a school test on purpose. Meanwhile, Alex wants to buy five pairs of sneakers but Penelope only allows him to buy one for less than $40. He buys five anyway, planning to keep them clean and then return them. Stressed by her children's actions, Penelope takes a recently-prescribed antidepressant over the protests of Lydia, who believes that she needs her ex-husband, Victor, back instead of drugs. Both women argue until the latter consoles the former. Penelope lets Alex keep the first pair of shoes that he has bought. She also tells Elena that she will not force her to have a Quinces, but when she explains that she selfishly wanted it in order to prove that she was succeeding as a single mother, Elena agrees to it.
2	2	"Bobos and Mamitas"	Pamela Fryman	Becky Mann & Audra Sielaff	January 6, 2017
Penelope takes an antidepressant after a night terror about being back at war in Afghanistan. At work, Penelope suggests an initiative to stagger patient appointments in order to improve the clinic's efficiency, but is repeatedly interrupted by a dismissive male co-worker, Scott. Lydia teaches Schneider salsa dancing in order to prepare him for a date. Elena is ignored by her classmates at lunch as she tries to get them to put their food waste in the new composting bin that she has initiated. The family discusses sexism, with Elena insisting that Scott's microaggressions and mansplaining is sexist, Penelope viewing "real" sexism as more overt, and Lydia thinking that men and women should embrace their natural differences. At work, Scott suggests Penelope's idea right in front of her to Dr. Leslie Berkowitz as if it was his own, leading to a huge argument between the two, and Penelope quits upon learning that Scott earns more than her. Later that day, Leslie visits Penelope's apartment to ask her to come back, and she agrees after negotiating a raise. Lydia convinces Elena to wear makeup to school, but after Elena finds it uncomfortable and removes it, her grandmother's reaction upsets her. To apologise, Lydia shows Elena her face without makeup.
3	3	"No Mass"	Phill Lewis	Sebastian Jones	January 6, 2017
Wanting to spend more time with her children, Penelope suggests that the family skip church on Sunday, but Lydia objects. The argument escalates to Penelope wanting her mother to be less overbearing. Lydia disappears the next morning, turning the house upside down. After talking to Leslie, Penelope finds her mother at church. Lydia then confides in her daughter about her anxieties around her age and her potentially not being useful in the family anymore. Just when they start to reconcile, they get into another huge argument when Penelope says that she isn't even sure that she believes in God. They eventually find a common ground when Lydia explains that God kept her daughter safe every day while she was in Afghanistan, and Penelope talks about a hard day in Afghanistan when she was inspired by the tennis player Serena Williams. Meanwhile, Elena's goth friend, Carmen, begins spending all of her time at the Alvarez apartment.
4	4	"A Snowman's Tale"	Phill Lewis	Gloria Calderón Kellett & Mike Royce	January 6, 2017
Told out of chronological order through multiple flashbacks, Penelope explores the idea of dating again. Schneider helps her set up an online dating profile. In the morning of a date, Lydia and Elena discover Penelope's plan. Elena approves of it but Lydia still wants her daughter to reunite with Victor. Penelope talks her mother into at least accepting her decision. Taking an Uber to the location, a nervous but energetic Penelope talks to the driver, and even calls Lydia to describe her first date with her late husband, Berto, which involves dancing in Cuba in 1958. At the bar, Penelope talks rapidly to the bartender, waitstaff and a woman called Abby in the bathroom. Eventually, she comes to the decision that she doesn't want to go on the date that night and leaves for a movie, but is interested in dating in the future. Meanwhile, Alex's friends try to set him up with a girl but he is not interested in having a girlfriend. After he slightly injures himself while trying to shave, Alex is taught by his mother how to shave safely.
5	5	"Strays"	Phill Lewis	Peter Murrieta	January 6, 2017
When Elena begins spending all her time with Carmen, Lydia suspects that there is something "queer" about it. After Penelope's workmates, Lori and Scott, forget the balloons and cake respectively for Leslie's office birthday party, Penelope invites him to dinner out of guilt. Penelope sends Carmen away for the night, upsetting Elena, but the adults drink and enjoy themselves. Carmen is caught trying to sneak back into the apartment and the group begin talking about immigration, which is sparked by the immigration project that Carmen and Elena have been doing all this time. Schneider reveals that he emigrated illegally from Canada and Lydia talks about coming to America from Cuba under Operación Pedro Pan. Scott believes that people should not migrate illegally and that America is "full up", with Lydia sympathising. Penelope argues against this. Elena finally confesses to Penelope the reason for Carmen's constant presence in the house; Carmen has nowhere else to go since her parents were deported to Mexico after travelling to get medical assistance. Schneider then pays for a plane ticket for Carmen to go to live with her brother in Texas. Lydia gives Elena advice about maintaining composure for her friend, and the duo parts with an emotional goodbye.
6	6	"The Death of Mrs. Resnick"	Victor Gonzalez	Andy Roth	January 6, 2017
Penelope's extremely old car, Mrs. Resnick, breaks down and is too costly to repair. Penelope is sad to lose it as it reminds her of good memories with Victor. After doing an extensive research, Penelope brings Schneider to the car dealership, ready to negotiate with an expected patronising man. She is instead surprised to meet salesperson Jill Riley, a black woman who also served in the army. However, they quickly get on and Penelope is happy with the final negotiated deal. Overwhelmed at the last minute by memories in her old car, Penelope opens up to Jill about how her relationship with Victor ended after he experienced post-traumatic stress from his military experiences. He developed alcoholism, his mental health worsened and one night he told her that he was going to kill himself. Jill encourages Penelope to let go of the car, and invites her to join a support group with other veteran women. Meanwhile, with the car out of commission, Schneider takes Alex to his baseball games while Elena decides to take public transport to reduce her carbon footprint, but she is caught in a lie by Lydia about taking the bus.
7	7	"Hold, Please"	Victor Gonzalez	Dan Hernandez & Benji Samit	January 6, 2017
Penelope is spending the day on hold with the United States Department of Veterans Affairs (VA) over medical care that she requires for a shoulder injury that she had sustained in Afghanistan. A street fair is in town, with Alex going with his friend from his baseball team, Schneider performing in a band with old friends from college, and Lydia and Leslie secretly attending together. Someone from the VA finally answers the phone and Penelope rushes to a nearby shop so that she can send a document by fax, leaving Elena in charge of the phone. Pressured by his friend, Alex steals a pill from Lydia and hides in Lydia's room when Elena enters the living room. Talking to herself in response to standard medical advice intermittently given by the on-hold line, Elena reveals that she might be attracted to girls and does not want to pick a boy as an escort for her Quinces. She then discovers Alex hiding and is furious to find him trying to sell drugs, but appreciates his laid-back attitude towards what he has overheard about her sexuality. When Penelope returns, she finally gets through to her primary care physician and eventually gets a chiropractor appointment after an impassioned argument.
8	8	"One Lie at a Time"	Phill Lewis	Debby Wolfe	January 6, 2017
Penelope tricks her family into thinking that she has a date, when instead she is going to group therapy with Jill. She quickly opens up and has a good time talking to the other women veterans. Lydia also lies to her family when she intends to go to the opera with Leslie, and insists to him that it is not a date. She accidentally injures her foot when a high heel snaps and Leslie takes her to his office to examine her, where she reveals that she had a stroke 15 years ago and that the family knows absolutely nothing about it. Elena asks a popular guy in her year, Josh Flores, to be her escort for her Quinces in hope that he would reject her and she wouldn't have to have a boy as her escort. Unfortunately for her, Josh accepts, and then she decides to invite him over in order to test her attraction for boys. With the rest of the family away from the apartment, Elena kisses Josh after he tells her that he has a crush on her. Meanwhile, Alex, who is at Schneider's apartment, lets it slip that Elena might be a lesbian, and that Elena is home alone with a boy. Schneider rushes into the apartment and sends Josh away just as the rest of the Alvarez family return home. Eventually, Lydia's and Penelope's secrets get exposed.
9	9	"Viva Cuba"	Jody Margolin Hahn	Michelle Badillo, Caroline Levich & Gloria Calderón Kellett	January 6, 2017
The Alvarez family takes offense when Schneider wears a Che Guevara shirt. Later, Elena discovers that she is a finalist for the Voices of Tomorrow young writers' program, but gets angry upon finding out that her acceptance is merely to fulfil the diversity quota. Elena rejects her place out of spite but Penelope argues that she has to accept the opportunities that she gets. Meanwhile, Alex has a class project on Cuba and films Lydia talking about her experiences there. He becomes passionate about the project and gets Penelope and Elena to dress in very stereotypical Cuban outfits for the video. When Lydia talks about Pedro Pan, she gets overwhelmed, and later tells Penelope that she had an older sister, Blanca, who was forced to stay in Cuba due to being too old for Pedro Pan. Lydia was subsequently told that Blanca had died of the flu there, though the former does not believe it. When Elena and the rest of the gang hears everything, she decides to accept her place for the Voices of Tomorrow. Lydia re-films her scene and Alex gets an A+. While talking to her co-workers, Penelope realises that her 18-year-old self would be disappointed in her, as she had never become a doctor. She is interested in pursuing this goal, but gets dissuaded when she learns the number of years and amount of money that it would cost. She does some research and ultimately decides to train as a nurse practitioner.
10	10	"Sex Talk"	Michael Lembeck	Becky Mann & Audra Sielaff	January 6, 2017
Having locked his laptop in a safe without realising that the combination to his safe is on his laptop, Schneider goes to Penelope's apartment to borrow Alex's laptop, where he finds threesome pornography. Lydia returns from the opera with Leslie, who sees the video when trying to use a search engine. Alex arrives home and Penelope reluctantly begins talking to him about sex. After mentioning porn and threesomes, the gang establishes that it was Elena, not Alex, who had watched the video. The next day at work, Penelope's colleagues stress her out about whether Elena and Josh are going further than kissing. She panics when she is unable to reach Elena, who is hanging out at Josh's house. Under the impression that Elena and Josh are having a party without the latter's parents around, she rushes to Josh's apartment and pushes her head through the pet door, only to find Elena, Josh and his sister watching a movie, thoroughly embarrassing Elena. When Elena returns home, Penelope talks to her about sex, and in the process Elena comes out to her.
11	11	"Pride & Prejudice"	Linda Mendoza	Sebastian Jones & Andy Roth	January 6, 2017
Penelope talks to Schneider about Elena's sexuality, and he reveals that he and Alex had already known. Penelope is struggling to process the information, but wants to be accepting. The next day, she talks to Elena enthusiastically about Autostraddle articles. Lydia trains Elena and Josh to dance for the Quinces and encourages romance between them, though unbeknownst to her, Josh already knows that Elena is gay. Elena eventually comes out to Lydia, who is initially unaccepting but very quickly concludes that she should be accepting for religious reasons. Penelope meets one of her therapy friends, Ramona, at a gay bar to talk about her feelings, only for Ramona to leave and flirt with a woman. Shortly afterwards, Penelope encounters a straight man named Ben at the bar, who tells her that she just needs time to readjust her understanding of her daughter. She later agrees to go on a date with him and then bonds with Elena by talking about him. Meanwhile, Alex gets into an important baseball team and Penelope reluctantly allows Schneider to take him to the first game, which requires an overnight trip. After the game, Schneider gets very overprotective, prompting the boys to lock him out of their hotel room. The boys take two of the hotel trolleys, race with them down the hallway, and get caught by security, so Schneider drives Alex home.
12	12	"Hurricane Victor"	Pamela Fryman	Dan Hernandez, Benji Samit & Peter Murrieta	January 6, 2017
On her fifth date with Ben, Penelope is interrupted by Lydia's texts, which reveal that Lydia is still adamantly in favor of her getting back together with Victor. Elena is nervous because she has little in common with Victor and struggles to make conversation with him. Victor surprises the family by arriving earlier than expected, and Lydia insists that he stay in the apartment instead of a hotel. Alex is delighted by his gift of a PlayStation 4, but Elena is not happy with the princess doll that she gets. Schneider has had a very tense first encounter with Victor, but the former eventually breaks the tension by transporting the instruments for Alex's cello recital at the behest of the latter after a teacher gets a flat tire. In the process, Victor and Penelope stall with karaoke. Victor later works out a better gift for Elena, a donation to Kiva, and finally signs the divorce papers for Penelope. Victor and Penelope kiss before her next date with Ben, during which she breaks up with him. Upon reaching home, Penelope discovers that Victor is still drinking and not getting support for his alcoholism and PTSD. They start a heated argument, with an angry Lydia telling Victor to leave after overhearing the argument and then comforting Penelope.
13	13	"Quinces"	Pamela Fryman	Gloria Calderón Kellett & Mike Royce	January 6, 2017
A sleep-deprived Penelope is stressed with planning for Elena's Quinces. Schneider helps to pick up some extended family from the airport, many of whom stay in the Alvarez apartment. While practising the father-daughter dance, Elena comes out to Victor, who gets disgruntled and disbelieving of his daughter's sexuality. Penelope tries to convince him to be supportive of their daughter regardless, especially during one of the most important events of her life. Meanwhile, Lydia thinks that she has failed in designing Elena's dress when Elena does not break down in tears of joy. Lydia continues making changes and refuses to believe her granddaughter when she says that she loves all versions of the dress. Leslie accidentally ruins Penelope's seating plan while handing out pastries to the extended Alvarez family, and Penelope falls asleep in exhaustion while trying to redesign it. The rest of the family work together to fix it and manage the remaining planning. Elena finally cries tears of joy when she sees the new outfit that Lydia has designed (with the help of Leslie): a suit. During the Quinces party, Penelope gives an emotional speech and Elena dances with Josh as Alex dances with Carmen, who has flown in to join the party with the help of Schneider. At the last minute, Victor leaves. The father-daughter dance starts and Elena realises that her father is not there, so Penelope, Alex, Lydia, Schneider and Leslie join her on the dance floor instead.

=== Season 2 (2018) ===
No. overall	No. in season	Title	Directed by	Written by	Original release date
14	1	"The Turn"	Pamela Fryman	Gloria Calderón Kellett & Mike Royce	January 26, 2018
The Alvarez family and Schneider enthusiastically support Alex at his baseball game, where Schneider shows Elena that he has been learning Spanish, and offers to teach it to her. Alex is embarrassed and irritated by his family's behavior. She gets a call from Alex's school about him punching another boy. Alex explains that the boy made a racist comment about him, and that this has happened regularly, including racist and even anti-Mexican slurs directed against him like beaner and wetback, though the family is not Mexican. After Alex has stormed off, the others talk about racism in America; Schneider is surprised that it occurs in Los Angeles. As a child, Lydia was called a spic, though the others find less weight to the slur as it is not frequently used any more. Elena, on the other hand, has not experienced racist abuse, perhaps because her lighter skin tone makes her pass as white. She is upset about not feeling Cuban, and asks Lydia to teach her Spanish. Penelope talks to Alex, sympathetically, and the family go out for ice cream. A man makes a racially charged comment, asking the family to be quiet, and Penelope successfully confronts him.
15	2	"Schooled"	Pamela Fryman	Becky Mann & Audra Sielaff	January 26, 2018
Penelope's nurse practitioner (NP) studies compound with her parenting responsibilities. She has not yet booked Alex's brace removal appointment and cannot take Elena to a Lesbians Against Fracking protest. Dr. Berkowitz talks to Penelope about her increasing stress, and she reveals that she has been failing NP tests, but he misunderstands and only adds to the pressure. At home, Lydia teaches ballet to five-year-olds, while Elena is pre-emptively planning a protest if the school declines her gay–straight alliance (GSA) proposal. For peace, Penelope prepares for a test the next day in Schneider's apartment, but he is disruptive. They talk about his newfound spinning hobby, the latest obsession for his addictive personality and a coping mechanism for him avoiding dating. When Elena is furious at the school accepting her GSA proposal, Penelope realizes it is about her father's homophobia and helps her process it and celebrate the GSA success. Penelope performed badly in her latest test; she talks with her family and decides to quit NP training, at least in the short term. The next morning, Lydia, Elena and Alex have all found ways to reduce the burden on Penelope so that she can continue studying.
16	3	"To Zir, With Love"	Phill Lewis	Sebastian Jones	January 26, 2018
Elena brings her Feminist Gamers of Echo Park friends to the apartment as they prepare to protest against a new video game. Penelope is confused by their declarations of preferred gender pronouns, which include Dani's "she/her" pronouns, Syd's "they/them" pronouns and others' neopronouns. On Penelope's first NP training day in hospital, she meets Max, a paramedic she worked with in the military. Lydia intuits that Elena has a crush on Dani, but Penelope insists that she must not date while in school. Meanwhile, Lydia flirts with Dr. Berkowitz. Penelope has sex with Max and talks to Schneider about it—he suggests a "junk buddy" relationship, like he has with Nikki, a St. Bibiana Academy mother. The eavesdropping Lydia gives Elena advice after she talks to Alex about Dani. Penelope is reluctant about pursuing a relationship with Max, but they agree to continue seeing each other despite free time limitations. Before Elena can speak to Dani, she reveals that she has a girlfriend, but Syd asks to share Elena's cookie and they begin to connect emotionally. Penelope allows her to go to ice-cream with Syd, conceding that Elena can make some time for romance.
17	4	"Roots"	Phill Lewis	Dan Signer	January 26, 2018
Lydia trips over tree roots on the sidewalk. Elena points out that the upcoming Proposition U would allocate money to sidewalk repairs. She is surprised to learn that Lydia has never voted, and Penelope votes only in presidential elections. Elena tries to explain to Lydia each upcoming proposition, but Lydia pretends somebody is at the door and leaves. On voting day, Lydia feigns illness, locks the family out of the apartment and flees via the fire escape. She finally confesses that she and her husband never became American citizens, as they did not want to renounce Cuban citizenship; she is a green card holder. Elena is worried about Lydia being deported, like Carmen's parents were, particularly if the rules change. While Lydia needs time to think, Schneider decides to become a citizen. Later, Lydia studies a guide to American citizenship with a cigar and Cuban music. Meanwhile, Penelope takes Alex to a movie and sneaks in snacks and drinks to save money, hiding them from the patrolling usher. Alex asks Penelope to accompany him to another movie, but they are made to leave after the usher discovers their food.
18	5	"Locked Down"	Phill Lewis	Dan Hernandez & Benji Samit	January 26, 2018
In the apartment, Elena and Syd prepare for their first date at Comic-Con and Lydia and Dr. Berkowitz are about to leave for the opera. Alex will attend a friend's bar mitzvah. Penelope invites Max over, but he is forced to hide when a neighborhood lockdown prevents them all from leaving. Elena is worried about making conversation with Syd as Penelope tries to orchestrate a situation where Max can exit the apartment. Schneider arrives with a survival kit, scared of being alone. Max, in hiding, overhears Penelope talking to Schneider about their relationship. They try to sneak Max out, but are discovered by Lydia and Dr. Berkowitz as they prepare food. Schneider pretends that Max is his Alcoholics Anonymous sponsor. Meanwhile, Alex tries to ease the awkwardness between Elena and Syd. Over dinner, Lydia suggests that Max and Penelope should begin dating. Syd leaves the living room, thinking that Elena is uninterested in them, but Elena kisses them and Syd kisses back. Meanwhile, Lydia lets slip that she has a gun. Penelope is furious at the safety risk it has posed, particularly when Victor was suicidal and because she has post-traumatic stress disorder. Schneider takes the gun, to be removed, from the household. However, Alex confronts Penelope about the gun she is hiding.
19	6	"Work Hard, Play Hard"	Pamela Fryman	Andy Roth	January 26, 2018
Penelope says that Alex must repay Lydia for the shoes she has bought him by working in the office with her and Dr. Berkowitz. She allows Elena to try reaching 1,000 subscribers on Twitch, where she livestreams herself playing video games, but if this has not happened within a week then she must find a traditional summer job. Penelope hoped she could bond with Alex like she did working with her father, but he is bored by the job; meanwhile, Elena attains 100 subscribers. Later, an annoyed patient is rude to Penelope, which makes her angry. A stressed Elena snaps when a power cut makes her lose her game progress, and she quits streaming. Dr. Berkowitz comes to the apartment to tell Penelope about a patient who named her daughter after her, because Penelope discovered her lymphoma. Elena gets a job as Schneider's assistant.
20	7	"Exclusive"	Pamela Fryman	Debby Wolfe	January 26, 2018
Lydia takes Schneider to the opera to spy on Dr. Berkowitz and his date. Lydia talks to his date—Esme—and learns that she uses the same lipstick as her and is Puerto Rican. Esme recognizes her and they argue. Meanwhile, Penelope is worried that Max may be seeing other people. Max confirms that he is not having sex with other women, but Schneider makes Penelope suspect he may be dating a woman they see on his Instagram. Penelope talks to Lydia about the unfairness of not dating Dr. Berkowitz and expecting him not to date other people, and realizes her hypocrisy. She tells Max that she wants to be his girlfriend, and he says the woman she saw is his cousin. Elena and Syd investigate who Alex is texting, knowing only the initial P. He says that it is Paige, who goes to another school. Penelope tells the family that she is dating Max and Lydia tells Dr. Berkowitz that she does not want a relationship. Elena follows Alex when he claims to be meeting a friend for pizza, and discovers that the "P." he is meeting there is "papi", their father.
21	8	"What Happened"	Phill Lewis	Sebastian Jones & Andy Roth	January 26, 2018
The episode intersperses flashbacks with present-day scenes. In the past, Penelope talks to Victor in the hospital about their newborn child Elena and they meet an unhappy Dr. Berkowitz. Later, they move into a new apartment and meet Schneider. Lydia and Berto insist that they will live with Penelope and Victor. Soon after, the family watch the 2001 September 11 attacks on the news; Victor decides to re-enroll in the military in response, and though Penelope is initially worried she re-enlists too. Years later, when Alex is born, Elena is initially furious and demands a puppy instead. In the present, a furious Elena tells Penelope and Lydia that Alex has been seeing Victor. Penelope is upset that he lied and Elena feels betrayed. Penelope confronts Victor and they argue about Elena's sexuality. Elena arrives and talks about the hurt she felt, the resilience she has and what Victor is missing out on. He hugs her. Elena and Penelope forgive Alex after discovering the things he told Victor in Elena's defense. Meanwhile, Alex discovers the mantilla that led Lydia and her sister Mirtha to stop speaking after Lydia accused her of stealing it.
22	9	"Hello, Penelope"	Phill Lewis	Michelle Badillo & Caroline Levich	January 26, 2018
Penelope lies to avoid telling Max about her antidepressants. At Penelope's support group, Pam recommends that each person record their thoughts to re-listen to and gain perspective. Penelope is dismissive; she decides to stop therapy and antidepressants. After giving a medical presentation at the children's school, Penelope is furious at herself despite the others believing it went well. Schneider talks to her and realizes that going off antidepressants is making her depressed, but she is extremely rude towards him. The next day, she skips work due to unwellness. Lydia gives her food and Vicks VapoRub, but she declines both. Penelope cancels on Max, whose parents she was going to meet. At Confession, Lydia says that she wishes she could take Penelope's pain away and feel it instead. Unable to sleep, Penelope records herself having negative thoughts and shows it to Schneider. He says that she should go back on her medication and recounts the story of his last alcohol relapse, in 2011. Penelope tells Lydia that she is going back to therapy and antidepressants, and Lydia says that she will support her with whatever she needs to do. She tells Max about her depression and anxiety.
23	10	"Storage Wars"	Kimberly McCullough	Becky Mann & Audra Sielaff	January 26, 2018
Schneider mentions Penelope's garage, to her confusion, and they discover that Lydia has been using it to compulsively hoard all of her possessions. Schneider trains Elena as his handyman; after her first job fixing a toilet problem, Schneider is jealous that Elena is more thorough than him. Lydia refuses to discard any of her items, trying to rearrange them to make space, and then trying to move some into the apartment. The elderly couple whose toilet Elena fixed complains to Schneider, as she did not engage in their pleasantries. Penelope goes behind Lydia's back to donate her Vanidades to a thrift shop; Lydia says that her savings bonds were hidden in one of the magazines. Alex and Penelope have to search through a dumpster to recover them, and Lydia then reveals that she was lying. Penelope and Lydia argue and Lydia explains the memory of Berto she has that makes one of the objects, a broken umbrella, valuable to her. Elena builds shelves in the garage so that there is room for Penelope to park there. Schneider reveals that they have a second garage too.
24	11	"Homecoming"	Pamela Fryman	Michelle Badillo, Caroline Levich & Debby Wolfe	January 26, 2018
While Alex is excited to take Emma to the school dance, Elena plans not to go until Syd asks her to with a rewritten "We Didn't Start the Fire". To avoid failing the school's volunteer requirements, Penelope is forced to cancel her weekend with Max at Palm Springs and bring him, Lydia and Dr. Berkowitz to chaperone the dance. Elena's only friends at the school are teachers, and she lied to Syd about her popularity, so she pretends to be friends with other students and ignores Mrs. Wallace. Penelope continues her antagonism with Sister Barbara, a judgemental woman who taught her when she attended the school. Schneider feels manipulated when Nikki calls him her boyfriend to gather favor for her PTA presidential candidacy, so he tells Sister Barbara incriminating things about her. Max says "I love you" to Penelope and she says it back. Dr. Berkowitz breaks up with Esme to be with Lydia, even only if as a friend. After Syd thinks Elena is embarrassed of them, Elena confesses the truth and apologizes to Mrs. Wallace. Alex discovers Emma was using him to make another boy jealous, but Max reassures him.
25	12	"Citizen Lydia"	Gloria Calderón Kellett	Dan Hernandez, Benji Samit & Dan Signer	January 26, 2018
At group therapy, Penelope talks about pressure she feels to have children with Max. Dr. Berkowitz tells her that she is young and healthy enough to have children for the next several years. Penelope talks to Schneider, who is unsure whether he wants to have kids, but reassures Penelope that she could become an excellent mother to more children. Finally, she decides to break up with Max, because he wants children but she does not want more. He offers to put aside the idea to continue the relationship, but she is insistent. She tells her family, but Lydia believes she is making a mistake, and that she could have more children with Max. Meanwhile, Lydia and Schneider take their citizenship tests. A relaxed Lydia interviews with a polite man, while the stressed Schneider—dressed in an American flag-themed outfit—is assessed by a strict, elderly woman. Schneider passes, and after correction of a typo in her documents while she anxiously waits outside, Lydia does too. The next morning, before the swearing-in ceremony, Penelope talks to Lydia through her curtain as she listens to Cuban music, but Lydia is not responsive and Penelope discovers something when she goes into her room.
26	13	"Not Yet"	Pamela Fryman	Gloria Calderón Kellett & Mike Royce	January 26, 2018
In the hospital, Lydia is in an induced coma. As Penelope and Elena get food, Alex talks to a still-unconscious Lydia. He paints her nails and recounts a story from church. Next, Dr. Berkowitz plays opera and says that she may be the love of his life. Elena applies lipstick to Lydia as she talks about their complicated relationship, and how she looks up to her. As Schneider returns with decorations, he talks about his emigration and drug and alcohol dependency. Lydia visited Schneider when he was in rehab for the fourth time. A priest performs last rites and Penelope then expresses anger over their argument, which reminds her of Lydia refusing to say goodbye to her after she joined the army. She breaks down in tears and forgives her mother, singing in Spanish. In a dream sequence, Berto and Lydia dance in the hospital; she talks about the things in her family's life she will miss if she dies. Berto asks if it is time for her to join him, and looking at a sleeping Penelope she says "not yet". Lydia wakes up and is joined by her family; later, she and Schneider attend a citizenship ceremony.

=== Season 3 (2019) ===
No. overall	No. in season	Title	Directed by	Written by	Original release date
27	1	"The Funeral"	Phill Lewis	Debby Wolfe	February 8, 2019
A family aunt, Ophelia, dies. Lydia's sister Mirtha will attend the funeral; the pair have not spoken since Lydia accused Mirtha of stealing the family mantilla, which Lydia unknowingly still had. Penelope insists that Lydia resolves the feud so she can reunite with Mirtha's daughter Estrellita. At the funeral, Lydia places the mantilla in Ophelia's coffin to frame her, while Alex distracts relatives. The sisters reunite. Back at the family's apartment, Mirtha's recounting of her cancer scare story makes Lydia jealous, but they sing Ave Maria together. Meanwhile, Elena tactlessly tries to prompt her aunt Pilar to say that she is gay. Pilar eventually reveals that she is openly gay, but her family continue to forget that she has come out to them, or misunderstand the nature of her relationship with her wife Susan. A fight breaks out between Penelope and Estrellita over whose family should keep the mantilla. In the ensuing argument, they discover the lace is not their family's mantilla, and Pilar reminds them that she and Susan have it. The group agree to resolve their differences, and Lydia tells Mirtha about her stroke, though Estrellita shocks Penelope by revealing her support for Donald Trump.
28	2	"Outside"	Pamela Fryman	Gloria Calderón Kellett & Mike Royce	February 8, 2019
Elena is deciding on a name to call Syd instead of "girlfriend", as Syd is non-binary; Schneider has a list of suggestions. Meanwhile, Alex goes to a museum with his girlfriend Chloe. Penelope discovers that Alex has a "Finsta"—a private Instagram account separate from the one she knows about—and sees him using the word ho and making crude gestures. This leads to a conversation with Scott and Dr. Berkowitz about the sexual harassment seminar they attended. Penelope confronts Alex and discovers that Lydia advised him to keep asking Chloe out after she turned him down. The family discuss what is romance and what is harassment, with differing views. Elena reveals that she experienced street harassment after holding hands with Syd and has been scared to be in public in the weeks since. Penelope discloses a story of her boss in the army sexually assaulting her. Later, Schneider proposes the name Syd-nifigicant other for Elena to call Syd.
29	3	"Benefit with Friends"	Angela Gomes	Sebastian Jones	February 8, 2019
Penelope is conflicted over whether she is attracted to Mateo as they are volunteering at a school fundraiser. After seeing him take charge with a delivery issue, she asks him out but he says they should remain friends. Later, he nervously asks her on a date—his first since a date with his wife 15 years ago. Meanwhile, Lydia refuses to follow the doctor's orders while she is on blood thinners. Elena tries to get her to use a cane, wear flats and auction knitting lessons rather than dancing lessons. After Lydia twists an ankle trying to prove she can dance, Elena confesses she has struggled to sleep since Lydia's coma. Lydia explains she is afraid to give up what makes her special and makes a "bouquet list" of what she wants to do before her death. Elsewhere at the fundraiser, Schneider tries to avoid going home with Nikki for the fourth time in a row as he auctions off "handyman for a day". He forms a connection with Avery, a kindergarten teacher, and fixes her typewriter. Avery and Nikki get in a bidding war but Schneider turns Nikki down and Avery gives him her number.
30	4	"Hermanos"	Phill Lewis	Becky Mann & Audra Sielaff	February 8, 2019
As Elena studies for the SAT, Alex suggests a vacation. Penelope spends three nights planning a trip to San Diego. On the drive there, which is required as Lydia will not fly, Elena vomits from carsickness. During their absence, Penelope asks Schneider to water their plant but Lydia asks Dr. Berkowitz. Schneider and Dr. Berkowitz argue over who gets to water the plant and, as both are lonely, stay and make lunch. On the balcony, Dr. Berkowitz shows Schneider his medical marijuana and Schneider discusses his eight-year sobriety. In San Diego, the family are pleased by the quality of the hotel. Tito arrives, invited by Lydia, and takes them to a restaurant on a boat. Penelope is enraged when she learns Tito was nearby when Lydia was hospitalized, as he did not visit. Lydia excuses herself. Penelope explains to Tito that he was needed for his father's funeral and Lydia's stroke. He apologizes. Meanwhile, Elena is irritated by Alex's crude social media videos, but they discuss their differences and agree not to end up like Penelope and Tito. They take pictures of each other and study vocabulary. Tito apologizes to Lydia.
31	5	"Nip It in the Bud"	Phill Lewis	Dan Signer	February 8, 2019
32	6	"One Valentine's Day at a Time"	Phill Lewis	Dan Hernandez & Benji Samit	February 8, 2019
33	7	"The First Time"	Phill Lewis	Michelle Badillo & Caroline Levich	February 8, 2019
34	8	"She Drives Me Crazy"	Todd Grinnell	Andy Roth	February 8, 2019
35	9	"Anxiety"	Kimberly McCullough	Janine Brito	February 8, 2019
36	10	"The Man"	Kimberly McCullough	Becky Mann & Audra Sielaff	February 8, 2019
37	11	"A Penny and a Nicole"	Phill Lewis	Sebastian Jones & Debby Wolfe	February 8, 2019
38	12	"Drinking and Driving"	Gloria Calderón Kellett	Dan Signer & Andy Roth	February 8, 2019
39	13	"Ghosts"	Gloria Calderón Kellett	Gloria Calderón Kellett & Mike Royce	February 8, 2019

=== Season 4 (2020) ===
No. overall	No. in season	Title	Directed by	Written by	Original release date	U.S. viewers (millions)
40	1	"Checking Boxes"	Pamela Fryman	Gloria Calderón Kellett & Mike Royce	March 24, 2020	0.124^{[a]}
Elena talks to her mother about the importance of the census for the Latinx community. Penelope tries going on dates again after the census makes her question her stance on being a single mother for the rest of her life. Elena and Syd “maturely” decide to break up once both go to college, but the couple soon finds that going through with the plan would be much harder after undergoing a trial separation for 24 hours.
41	2	"Penny Pinching"	Phill Lewis	Dan Signer	March 31, 2020	0.169^{[b]}
Schneider tries to convince Penelope to buy a brand new sofa after it breaks in half, and teaches her not to be too frugal after she inadvertently embarrasses Alex in front of his new girlfriend, Nora. Meanwhile, Elena intends to go to an Overwatch League match alone and agrees to drop Alex and Lydia off for their errands while on her way there, but last minute pick-ups (including Leslie) derail her plan to be on time. In order to avoid missing the entire match, the quartet ends up going to the match together. In the midst of the match, somebody breaks into the family car and steals Elena's laptop, which infuriates Penelope.
42	3	"Boundaries"	Phill Lewis	Brigitte Muñoz-Liebowitz	April 7, 2020	0.157^{[c]}
Alex accidentally walks in on Penelope masturbating. She tries to convince her son that it is completely normal to indulge in self-love every now and then, but her mother believes that it is a sin. Alex complains that there are no boundaries in the household, to which Penelope argues that there should not be boundaries and secrets between family members. When she learns that Lydia decides to catfish men using online dating apps (with the help of Schneider) in order to get her a date and stop her self-gratification habit, Penelope firmly changes her mind about not having boundaries, much to Lydia's chagrin. In the end, Penelope and Max reunite with the help of Lydia.
43	4	"One Halloween at a Time"	Phill Lewis	Vincent Brown	April 14, 2020	0.164^{[d]}
Lydia finds a positive pregnancy test kit in the trash can and thinks that it belongs to her daughter, so she decides to spy on Penelope and Max with Leslie. When it is revealed that the kit is not Penelope's, the quartet suspects that it is Nora's (since they think it could never be Elena's). Penelope and Max decide to go to Nora's house to confront Alex and his girlfriend, both of whom are in the midst of having a party there. After Nora reveals that she isn't pregnant (since Alex and her haven't had sex), the Alvarez family soon finds out that the kit belongs to Avery. Meanwhile, Elena and Syd try to go door-to-door to talk about climate change, but to no avail as they are constantly mistaken for trick-or-treaters, and Schneider and Avery try to find the best couple costume to wear in order to win a Halloween costume contest.
44	5	"Perfect"	Angela Barnes Gomes	Alison Wong	April 21, 2020	0.138^{[e]}
Penelope gets concerned after Alex randomly asks her for $500. He then explains that it is for taking fashion design classes. Lydia and Penelope later discover that Alex had lied about taking the classes when he comes home with a bought pair of shorts. After confronting her son about it, Penelope learns that as much as Alex loves fashion design, he had failed at making jeans during the first class and is scared of failing again especially amidst pressure from realising how “perfect” the family is in handling their respective everyday lives. Penelope then teaches her son that it is okay to fail sometimes, and convinces him to continue taking the classes. Meanwhile, Elena starts to panic about not being able to write the perfect essay in order to enter Yale, and Schneider and Avery get scared about losing their love for one another after Leslie tells them about his failing marriage while bringing them a tacky and creepy baby shower gift. The gift causes much tension between the couple and results in them having small fights.
45	6	"Supermoon"	Michael Shea	Erin Foley	April 28, 2020	0.187^{[f]}
During the night of the supermoon, Schneider decorates the rooftop for an unknown person, and Alex and Elena try to figure out who it is. Alex celebrates his three-month anniversary with Nora and reveals that he is scared about having sex because he's afraid that it might cause their relationship to end like his parents'. Elena and Syd are worried about one another's crushes after the former reveals that she has a crush on an employee at her go-to coffee shop, and the latter names their celebrity crushes with no hesitation. Penelope tells Max that she doesn't want to get married after what happened with Victor and how it had affected the family. It is eventually revealed that the decorations are for Lydia, as she has decided to spread her late husband's ashes on the rooftop garden that he had always tended to back when he was alive.
46	7	"The Politics Episode"	Phill Lewis and M.R. Horhager	Gloria Calderón Kellett & Mike Royce	June 16, 2020	0.038^{[g]}
With Lydia's sister, Mirtha, and her radically conservative family due to visit, Penelope tries to figure out how to avoid fighting with them about both families' differing political views as she and the rest of the gang try playing out different possible scenarios. In the process, Schneider talks about his own strained family situation and tries to convince the Alvarez family how lucky they are to have family members that still want to see them despite unavoidable differences. Note: Due to production being halted by the COVID-19 pandemic, this episode was animated with the cast members appearing in voice-only roles.

^{a} The viewership listed is for the Pop TV airing only. Simulcasts on TV Land and Logo drew 457,000 and 26,000 viewers, respectively, for a total audience of 607,000 viewers across all three channels.

^{b} The viewership listed is for the Pop TV airing only. Simulcast on TV Land drew 399,000 viewers, for a total audience of 568,000 viewers across both channels.
^{c} The viewership listed is for the Pop TV airing only. Simulcast on TV Land drew 436,000 viewers, for a total audience of 593,000 viewers across both channels.
^{d} The viewership listed is for the Pop TV airing only. Delayed airing on TV Land two days later drew 325,000 viewers, for a total audience of 489,000 viewers across both channels.
^{e} The viewership listed is for the Pop TV airing only. Simulcast on TV Land drew 368,000 viewers, for a total audience of 506,000 viewers across both channels.
^{f} The viewership listed is for the Pop TV airing only. Simulcast on TV Land drew 334,000 viewers, for a total audience of 521,000 viewers across both channels.

^{g} The viewership listed is for the Pop TV airing only. Simulcast on TV Land drew 304,000 viewers, for a total audience of 342,000 viewers across both channels.

== Ratings ==
=== Season 4 ===
Viewership and ratings per episode of List of One Day at a Time (2017 TV series) episodes
No.	Title	Air date	Rating (18–49)	Viewers (millions)	DVR (18–49)	DVR viewers (millions)	Total (18–49)	Total viewers (millions)
1	"Checking Boxes"	March 24, 2020	0.04	0.124	TBD	TBD	TBD	TBD
2	"Penny Pinching"	March 31, 2020	0.06	0.169	TBD	TBD	TBD	TBD
3	"Boundaries"	April 7, 2020	0.07	0.157	TBD	TBD	TBD	TBD
4	"One Halloween at a Time"	April 14, 2020	0.07	0.164	0.08	TBD	0.15	TBD
5	"Perfect"	April 21, 2020	0.05	0.138	TBD	TBD	TBD	TBD
6	"Supermoon"	April 28, 2020	0.07	0.187	TBD	TBD	TBD	TBD
7	"The Politics Episode"	June 16, 2020	0.01	0.038	TBD	TBD	TBD	TBD
