= Primetime Emmy Award for Outstanding Picture Editing for a Multi-Camera Comedy Series =

Television award category

- Awarded for: Outstanding Picture Editing for a Multi-Camera Comedy Series
- Country: United States
- Presented by: Academy of Television Arts & Sciences
- Currently held by: Leanne (2026)
- Website: emmys.com

The Primetime Emmy Award for Outstanding Picture Editing for a Multi-Camera Comedy Series was awarded to one television series each year. Between 2003 and 2012, the category was consolidated to include both multi-camera and single-camera comedy series.

In the following list, the first titles listed in gold are the winners; those not in gold are nominees, which are listed in alphabetical order. The years given are those in which the ceremonies took place.

== Winners and nominations ==
indicates the winner

Outstanding Videotape Editing for a Series

=== 1970s ===
Year	Program	Episode	Nominees	Network
1976
1976	The Adams Chronicles	"John Adams, Diplomat"	Girish Bhargava and Manford Schorn	PBS
1976	Barney Miller	"Happy New Year"	Homer Powell, Fred Golan and Paul Schatzkin	ABC
1976	Sanford and Son	"Earthquake II"	Ken Denisoff and Robert Veatch	NBC
1976	Welcome Back, Kotter	"The Telethon"	Susan Jenkins and Manuel Martínez	ABC
1977
1977	Visions	"The War Widow"	Roy Stewart	PBS
1977	C.P.O. Sharkey	"Sharkey Boogies on Down"	Ken Denisoff and Stowell Werden	NBC
1977	Meeting of Minds	"Marie Antoinette / Sir Thomas More / Karl Marx / Ulysses S. Grant, Part 1"	Terry Pickford	PBS
1977	Police Story	"Ice Time"	Jimmy B. Frazier	NBC
1978
1978	The Carol Burnett Show	"The Final Show"	Tucker Wiard	CBS
1978	The Betty White Show	"Pilot"	Chip Brooks	CBS
1978	Husbands, Wives & Lovers	"The One Where Everybody Is Looking for a Little Action"	Marco Zappia	CBS
1978	Laugh-In	"Tina Turner"	Ed J. Brennan	NBC
1978	Soap	"102"	Gary Anderson	ABC
1978	Three's Company	"Chrissy, Come Home"	Jerry Davis	ABC
1979
1979	Stockard Channing in Just Friends	"Pilot"	Andy Zall	CBS
1979	All in the Family	"The 200th Episode Celebration"	Hal Collins and Harvey Berger	CBS

=== 1980s ===
Year	Program	Episode	Nominees	Network
1980
1980	The Muppet Show	"Liza Minnelli"	John Hawkins	Syndicated
1980	The Big Show	"Tony Randall and Hervé Villechaize"	Ken Denisoff, Kevin Muldoon and Andy Zall	NBC
1980	Fridays	"Boz Scaggs"	Terry Pickford	ABC
1980	A New Kind of Family	"I Do"	Marco Zappia	ABC
1981
1981	WKRP in Cincinnati	"Bah Humbug"	Andy Ackerman	CBS
1981	Barbara Mandrell and the Mandrell Sisters	"Dolly Parton and John Schneider"	Andy Zall	NBC
1981	Barbara Mandrell and the Mandrell Sisters	"Ray Stevens"	Ken Denisoff	NBC
1981	The Muppet Show	"Brooke Shields"	John Hawkins	Syndicated
1982
1982	Barbara Mandrell and the Mandrell Sisters	"Brenda Lee and Paul Williams"	Ken Denisoff	NBC
1982	The Greatest American Hero	"The Lost Diablo"	John Carrol, Mario DiMambro, Dave Goldson, Art Schneider and Roderic G. Stephens	ABC
1982	Report to Murphy	"High Noon"	Raymond M. Bush	CBS
1982	WKRP in Cincinnati	"Fire"	Andy Ackerman	CBS
1983
1983	The Jeffersons	"Change of a Dollar"	Larry Harris	CBS
1983	Alice	"Vera, the Torch"	Tucker Wiard	CBS
1983	Archie Bunker's Place	"Three Women"	Marco Zappia	CBS
1983	Newhart	"Grandma, What a Big Mouth You Have"	Andy Ackerman	CBS
1983	Real People	"502"	Diane Block, Tee Bosustow, Cary Gries, Michael Kelly, Doug Loviska, Bruce Motyer, Bill Paulsen, Nicholas Stein, Cynthia Vaughn and Joe Walsh	NBC
1984
1984	Fame	"Gonna Learn How to Fly, Part 2"	Howard Brock	Syndicated
1984	Benson	"Down the Drain"	Michael Riolo	ABC
1984	Fame	"Break Dance"	Jim McElroy	Syndicated
1984	Kate & Allie	"Dear Diary"	Marco Zippia	CBS
1985
1985	Fame	"Reflections"	Jim McElroy	Syndicated
1985	Night Court	"The Blizzard"	Jerry Davis	NBC

Outstanding Multi-Camera Editing for a Series

Year	Program	Episode	Nominees	Network
1986
1986	The Cosby Show	"Full House"	Henry Chan	NBC
1986	Cheers	"Birth, Death, Love and Rice"	Andy Ackerman	NBC
1986	Cheers	"The Triangle"	Douglas Hines	NBC
1986	The Golden Girls	"Pilot"	Harold McKenzie	NBC
1986	Night Court	"Hurricane"	Jerry Davis	NBC
1987
1987	Night Court	"Her Honor, Part 1"	Jerry Davis	NBC
1987	Cheers	"Cheers: The Motion Picture"	Andy Ackerman	NBC
1987	The Cosby Show	"I Know That You Know"	Henry Chan	NBC
1987	Family Ties	"Band on the Run"	Gary Anderson and Jon Bellis	NBC
1987	The Golden Girls	"Twas the Nightmare Before Christmas"	Harold McKenzie	NBC
1988
1988	Cheers	"The Big Kiss-Off"	Andy Ackerman	NBC
1988	Designing Women	"Killing All the Right People"	Roger Bondelli	CBS
1988	The Golden Girls	"Old Friends"	Jim McElroy	NBC
1988	Newhart	"A Midseason Night's Dream"	Mike Wilcox	CBS
1988	The Tracey Ullman Show	"Ginny Redux," "Fear," "Real Lace"	Douglas Hines and M. Pam Blumenthal	Fox
1989
1989	Murphy Brown	"Respect"	Tucker Wiard	CBS
1989	Married... with Children	"Requiem for a Dead Barber"	Larry Harris	Fox
1989	Murphy Brown	"It's How You Play the Game"	Jerry Davis	CBS
1989	Roseanne	"Toto, We're Not in Kansas Anymore"	Marco Zappia	ABC
1989	The Tracey Ullman Show	"To Masseur with Love," "Conjugal Visit"	Douglas Hines and M. Pam Blumenthal	Fox

=== 1990s ===
Year	Program	Episode	Nominees	Network
1990
1990	The Tracey Ullman Show	"...And God Created Tillman," "Rare Talent"	Douglas Hines and M. Pam Blumenthal	Fox
1990	Designing Women	"The First Day of the Last Decade of the Entire 20th Century"	Judy Burke	CBS
1990	Married... with Children	"Who'll Stop the Rain"	Larry Harris	Fox
1990	Murphy Brown	"The Strike"	Tucker Wiard	CBS
1990	Newhart	"The Last Newhart"	Mike Wilcox	CBS
1991
1991	Murphy Brown	"On Another Plane"	Tucker Wiard	CBS
1991	Cheers	"The Days of Wine and Neuroses"	Andy Ackerman	NBC
1991	Cheers	"Rat Girl"	Sheila Amos	NBC
1991	Coach	"The Break-Up"	Andrew Chulack	ABC
1992
1992	Seinfeld	"The Subway"	Janet Ashikaga	NBC
1992	Cheers	"An Old Fashioned Wedding"	Robert Bramwell and Peter Chakos	NBC
1992	Coach	"A Real Guy's Guy"	Andrew Chulack	ABC
1992	Home Improvement	"Stereo Typical"	Marco Zappia and Alex Gimenez	ABC
1992	Murphy Brown	"Send in the Clowns"	Tucker Wiard	CBS
1993
1993	Cheers	"One for the Road"	Robert Bramwell	NBC
1993	Coach	"Vows"	Andrew Chulack	ABC
1993	Home Improvement	"To Build or Not to Build"	Marco Zappia and Alex Gimenez	ABC
1993	Murphy Brown	"The World According to Avery"	Tucker Wiard	CBS
1993	Seinfeld	"The Pilot"	Janet Ashikaga	NBC
1994
1994	Frasier	"The Show Where Lilith Comes Back"	Ron Volk	NBC
1994	Seinfeld	"The Opposite"	Janet Ashikaga	NBC
1994	Coach	"The Luck Stops Here"	Andrew Chulack	ABC
1994	Home Improvement	"It Was the Best of Tim's, It Was the Worst of Tim's"	Marco Zappia and Roger Ames Berger	ABC
1994	Murphy Brown	"Socks and the Single Woman"	Robert Souders and Tucker Wiard	CBS
1995
1995	Seinfeld	"The Diplomat's Club"	Janet Ashikaga	NBC
1995	Frasier	"The Matchmaker"	Ron Volk	NBC
1995	Friends	"The One with Two Parts, Part 2"	Andy Zall	NBC
1995	Home Improvement	"Don't Tell Momma"	Marco Zappia and Roger Ames Berger	ABC
1995	Mad About You	"The Ride Home"	Sheila Amos	NBC
1996
1996	Frasier	"The Show Where Diane Comes Back"	Ron Volk	NBC
1996	Frasier	"The Adventures of Bad Boy and Dirty Girl"	Timothy Mozer	NBC
1996	Home Improvement	"The Longest Day"	Marco Zappia and Roger Ames Berger	ABC
1996	Murphy Brown	"Up in Smoke"	Tucker Wiard	CBS
1996	Seinfeld	"The Rye"	Janet Ashikaga	NBC

Outstanding Multi-Camera Picture Editing for a Comedy Series

Year	Program	Episode	Nominees	Network
1997
1997	Ellen	"The Puppy Episode"	Kris Trexler	ABC
1997	Frasier	"To Kill a Talking Bird"	Ron Volk	NBC
1997	The Larry Sanders Show	"Everybody Loves Larry"	Leslie Tolan and Sean K. Lambert	HBO
1997	The Larry Sanders Show	"My Name Is Asher Kingsley"	Leslie Tolan and Paul Anderson	HBO
1997	Seinfeld	"The Pothole"	Skip Collector	NBC
1998
1998	Frasier	"Room Service"	Ron Volk	NBC
1998	Frasier	"Roz and the Schnoz"	Janet Ashikaga	NBC
1998	The Larry Sanders Show	"Flip"	Leslie Tolan, Paul Anderson and Sean K. Lambert	HBO
1998	Murphy Brown	"Opus One"	Tucker Wiard	CBS
1998	Seinfeld	"The Finale"	Skip Collector	NBC
1999
1999	Sports Night	"Small Town"	Janet Ashikaga	ABC
1999	Frasier	"Shutout in Seattle"	Ron Volk	NBC
1999	Just Shoot Me!	"Two Girls for Every Boy"	Paul Anderson	NBC
1999	3rd Rock from the Sun	"Dick and Taxes"	Vince Humphrey	NBC

=== 2000s ===
Year	Program	Episode	Nominees	Network
2000
2000	Frasier	"Something Borrowed, Something Blue"	Ron Volk and Scott Maisano	NBC
2000	Frasier	"Dark Side of the Moon"	Ron Volk	NBC
2000	Friends	"The One with the Proposal"	Stephen Prime	NBC
2000	Sports Night	"The Cut Man Cometh"	Janet Ashikaga	ABC
2000	Will & Grace	"Ben? Her?"	Peter Chakos	NBC
2001
2001	Frasier	"Daphne Returns"	Ron Volk	NBC
2001	The Drew Carey Show	"Drew's in a Coma"	John Fuller	ABC
2001	Everybody Loves Raymond	"Italy"	Patricia Barnett	CBS
2001	Spin City	"Minor League"	Noel Rogers	ABC
2001	Will & Grace	"Lows in the Mid-Eighties"	Peter Chakos	NBC
2002
2002	Frasier	"The Proposal"	Ron Volk	NBC
2002	Everybody Loves Raymond	"Talk to Your Daughter"	Patricia Barnett	CBS
2002	Friends	"The One with the Halloween Party"	Kenny Tintorri	NBC
2002	Friends	"The One with the Rumor"	Stephen Prime	NBC
2002	Will & Grace	"A Chorus Lie"	Peter Chakos	NBC
2003
2003	Frasier	"Rooms with a View"	Ron Volk	NBC
2003	Everybody Loves Raymond	"She's the One"	Patricia Barnett	CBS
2003	Friends	"The One in Barbados"	Stephen Prime	NBC
2003	Friends	"The One with Ross's Inappropriate Song"	Kenny Tintorri	NBC
2003	Will & Grace	"Marry Me a Little, Marry Me a Little More"	Peter Chakos	NBC
2004
2004	Frasier	"Goodnight, Seattle"	Ron Volk	NBC
2004	Everybody Loves Raymond	"Golf for It"	Patricia Barnett	CBS
2004	Friends	"The Last One"	Stephen Prime	NBC
2004	That '70s Show	"Sparks"	David Helfand	Fox
2004	Will & Grace	"Last Ex to Brooklyn"	Peter Chakos	NBC
2005
2005	Scrubs	"My Life in Four Cameras"	John Michel	NBC
2005	Everybody Loves Raymond	"The Faux Pas"	Patricia Barnett	CBS
2005	That '70s Show	"Angie"	Michael Karlich	Fox
2005	Two and a Half Men	"It Was Mame, Mom"	Joe Bella	CBS
2005	Will & Grace	"The Newlydreads"	Peter Chakos	NBC
2006
2006	Two and a Half Men	"That Special Tug"	Joe Bella	CBS
2006	Late Night with Conan O'Brien	"2198"	Katherine Babiak, Vic Fabilli, Liz Gross and Mark Jankeloff	NBC
2006	Late Show with David Letterman	"2519"	James Alkins, Tom Catusi, Andrew Evangelista, Stephen Hostomsky, Mona Lu and Mark Spada	CBS
2006	That '70s Show	"We Will Rock You"	Michael Karlich	Fox
2006	Will & Grace	"The Finale"	Peter Chakos	NBC
2007
2007	Two and a Half Men	"Release the Dogs"	Joe Bella	CBS
2007	American Idol	"Idol Gives Back"	Bill DeRonde, Oren Castro, Gus Comegys, John Cox, Patrick Franks, Narumi Inatsugu, Peter Tim Perniciaro, Jeff Roe and Ryan Tanner	Fox
2007	The Daily Show with Jon Stewart	"12043"	Tonya Dreher, Graham Frazier, Mark Paone, Daric Schlesselman, Einar Westerlund and Rob York	Comedy Central
2007	Dancing with the Stars	"304"	Ned Kerwin, Pamela Malouf, David Timoner and Hans van Riet	ABC
2007	How I Met Your Mother	"Robin Sparkles"	Sue Federman	CBS

Between 2008 and 2011, multi-camera sitcoms competed alongside single-camera sitcoms for Outstanding Picture Editing for a Comedy Series (Single or Multi-Camera).

=== 2010s ===
Year	Program	Episode	Nominees	Network
2012 (64th)	How I Met Your Mother	"Trilogy Time"	Susan Federman	CBS
2012 (64th)	The Big Bang Theory	"The Countdown Reflection"	Peter Chakos	CBS
2012 (64th)	Hot in Cleveland	"God and Football"	Mark Alan Dashnaw	TV Land
2012 (64th)	Two and a Half Men	"Why We Gave Up Women"	Joseph Bella	CBS
2012 (64th)	2 Broke Girls	"And the Kosher Cupcakes"	Darryl Bates	CBS
2013 (65th)	How I Met Your Mother	"P.S. I Love You"	Susan Federman	CBS
2013 (65th)	The Big Bang Theory	"The Love Spell Potential"	Peter Chakos	CBS
2013 (65th)	The Colbert Report	"9082"	Christein Aromando and Andrew Matheson	Comedy Central
2013 (65th)	Conan	"Occupy Conan"	Robert James Ashe, Dan Dome, Dave Grecu and Chris Heller	TBS
2013 (65th)	Hot in Cleveland	"Magic Diet Candy"	Ronald A. Volk	TV Land
2014 (66th)	The Big Bang Theory	"The Cooper Extraction"	Peter Chakos	CBS
2014 (66th)	The Colbert Report	"9115"	Christein Aromando and Jason Baker	Comedy Central
2014 (66th)	The Daily Show with Jon Stewart	"19006"	Robert York, Eric Davies, Graham Frazier and Daric Schlesselman	Comedy Central
2014 (66th)	How I Met Your Mother	"Gary Blauman"	Sue Federman	CBS
2014 (66th)	Jimmy Kimmel Live!	"Behind the Scandelabra"	James Crowe, Jason Bielski, Brian Marsh, Kevin McCullough and Matt Williams	ABC
2015 (67th)	The Big Bang Theory	"The Comic Book Store Regeneration"	Peter Chakos	CBS
2015 (67th)	Hot in Cleveland	"I Hate Goodbyes"	Ronald A. Volk	TV Land
2015 (67th)	Mike & Molly	"Fight to the Finish"	Stephen Prime	CBS
2015 (67th)	2 Broke Girls	"And the Move-In Meltdown"	Darryl Bates and Ben Bosse	CBS
2016 (68th)	The Big Bang Theory	"The Opening Night Excitation"	Peter Chakos	CBS
2016 (68th)	Horace and Pete	"103"	Gina Sansom	LouisCK.net
2016 (68th)	Last Man Standing	"The Road Less Driven"	Kris Trexler	ABC
2016 (68th)	Mike & Molly	"I See Love"	Stephen Prime	CBS
2016 (68th)	Mom	"Atticus Finch and the Downtrodden"	Ben Bosse and Joe Bella	CBS
2016 (68th)	2 Broke Girls	"And the Sax Problems"	Darryl Bates	CBS
2017 (69th)
2017 (69th)	The Big Bang Theory	"The Holiday Summation"	Peter Chakos	CBS
2017 (69th)	Last Man Standing	"Trick or Treat"	Kris Trexler	ABC
2017 (69th)	Mom	"Bad Hand and British Royalty"	Joe Bella	CBS
2017 (69th)	One Day at a Time	"A Snowman's Tale"	Pat Barnett	Netflix
2017 (69th)	2 Broke Girls	"And the Planes, Fingers and Automobiles"	Chris Poulos	CBS
2018 (70th)
2018 (70th)	Will & Grace	"Grandpa Jack"	Peter Beyt	NBC
2018 (70th)	The Big Bang Theory	"The Bow Tie Asymmetry"	Peter Chakos	CBS
2018 (70th)	Mom	"Crazy Snakes and a Clog to the Head"	Joe Bella	CBS
2018 (70th)	One Day at a Time	"Not Yet"	Pat Barnett	Netflix
2018 (70th)	Roseanne	"Darlene v. David"	Brian Schnuckel	ABC
2019 (71st)
2019 (71st)	One Day at a Time	"The Funeral"	Pat Barnett	Netflix
2019 (71st)	The Big Bang Theory	"The Stockholm Syndrome"	Peter Chakos	CBS
2019 (71st)	The Conners	"Keep on Truckin'"	Brian Schnuckel	ABC
2019 (71st)	Mom	"Big Floor Pillows and a Ball of Fire"	Joe Bella	CBS
2019 (71st)	Will & Grace	"Family, Trip"	Peter Beyt	NBC

=== 2020s ===
Year	Program	Episode	Nominees	Network
2020 (72nd)
2020 (72nd)	One Day at a Time	"Boundaries"	Cheryl Campsmith	Pop TV
2020 (72nd)	The Conners	"Slappy Holidays"	Brian Schnuckel	ABC
2020 (72nd)	Will & Grace	"We Love Lucy"	Peter Beyt	NBC
2020 (72nd)	Will & Grace	"What a Dump"	Joseph Fulton	NBC
2021 (73rd)
2021 (73rd)	The Conners	"Jeopardé, Sobrieté and Infidelité"	Brian Schnuckel	ABC
2021 (73rd)	Man with a Plan	"Driving Miss Katie"	Sue Federman	CBS
2021 (73rd)	Mom	"Scooby-Doo Checks and Salisbury Steak"	Joe Bella	CBS
2022 (74th)
2022 (74th)	How I Met Your Father	"Timing Is Everything"	Sue Federman	Hulu
2022 (74th)	Call Me Kat	"Call Me by My Middle Name"	Pamela Marshall	Fox
2023 (75th)
2023 (75th)	Night Court	"Pilot"	Kirk Benson and Chris Poulos	NBC
2023 (75th)	Call Me Kat	"Call Me Consciously Uncoupled"	Pamela Marshall	Fox
2023 (75th)	How I Met Your Father	"Daddy"	Russell Griffin	Hulu
2023 (75th)	The Upshaws	"Duct Up"	Russell Griffin and Angel Gamboa Bryant	Netflix
2023 (75th)	The Upshaws	"Off Beat"	Angel Gamboa Bryant	Netflix
2024 (76th)
2024 (76th)	How I Met Your Father	"Okay Fine, It's a Hurricane"	Russell Griffin	Hulu
2024 (76th)	Frasier	"Blind Date"	Joseph Fulton	Paramount+
2024 (76th)	Night Court	"Wheelers of Fortune"	Stephen Prime	NBC
2024 (76th)	The Upshaws	"Ain't Broke"	Angel Gamboa Bryant and Brian LeCoz	Netflix
2024 (76th)	The Upshaws	"Auto Motives"	Angel Gamboa Bryant	Netflix
2025 (77th)
2025 (77th)	Frasier	"My Brilliant Sister"	Russell Griffin	Paramount+
2025 (77th)	The Conners	"The Truck Stops Here"	Brian Schnuckel	ABC
2025 (77th)	Mid-Century Modern	"Here's to You, Mrs. Schneiderman"	Peter J. Chakos	Hulu
2025 (77th)	The Upshaws	"Buy Now"	Brian LeCoz and Angel Gamboa Bryant	Netflix
2025 (77th)	The Upshaws	"Grifter, Grifter"	Angel Gamboa Bryant	Netflix
2026 (78th)
2026 (78th)	Leanne	"Having Big Feelings"	Russell Griffin	Netflix
2026 (78th)	The Neighborhood	"Welcome to the Zhuzh"	Chris Poulos and Tim DeLone	CBS
2026 (78th)	Shifting Gears	"Nutcracker"	Pamela Marshall	ABC
2026 (78th)	Tyler Perry's Assisted Living	"A Rolling Stone"	Jennifer Viola	BET
2026 (78th)	The Upshaws	"Election Day"	Angel Gamboa Bryant	Netflix

== Programs with multiple awards ==
Totals include wins for Outstanding Picture Editing for a Comedy Series (Single or Multi-Camera).

9 wins

- Frasier

4 wins

- The Big Bang Theory

3 wins

- How I Met Your Mother
- Seinfeld

2 wins

- Cheers
- Fame
- How I Met Your Father
- Murphy Brown
- One Day at a Time
- Two and a Half Men

== Programs with multiple nominations ==
Totals include nominations for Outstanding Picture Editing for a Comedy Series (Single or Multi-Camera).

16 nominations

- Frasier

11 nominations

- Will & Grace

9 nominations

- The Big Bang Theory
- Murphy Brown

7 nominations

- Cheers
- Friends
- Seinfeld
- The Upshaws

6 nominations

- How I Met Your Mother

5 nominations

- Everybody Loves Raymond
- Home Improvement
- Mom

4 nominations

- Coach
- The Conners
- One Day at a Time
- 2 Broke Girls

3 nominations

- Barbara Mandrell and the Mandrell Sisters
- Fame
- The Golden Girls
- How I Met Your Father
- Hot in Cleveland
- The Larry Sanders Show
- Newhart
- Night Court
- That '70s Show
- The Tracey Ullman Show
- Two and a Half Men

2 nominations

- Call Me Kat
- The Colbert Report
- The Cosby Show
- The Daily Show with Jon Stewart
- Designing Women
- Last Man Standing
- Married... with Children
- Mike & Molly
- The Muppet Show
- Night Court
- Roseanne
- Sports Night
- WKRP in Cincinnati
