= Nesting (2012 film) =

- Poster
- Directed by: John Chuldenko
- Written by: John Chuldenko
- Produced by: Laura Boersma; John Chuldenko
- Starring: Todd Grinnell; Ali Hillis
- Cinematography: Frederick Schroeder
- Edited by: Sam Restivo
- Music by: Julian Wass
- Production company: Dangertrain Films
- Distributed by: PMK*BNC Films
- Release dates: March 2012 (Cleveland Film Festival); May 11, 2012 (limited)
- Running time: 92 minutes 93 minutes
- Country: United States
- Language: English

Nesting is a 2012 American romantic comedy film written and directed by John Chuldenko and starring Todd Grinnell and Ali Hillis. The film premiered at the 2012 Cleveland Film Festival.

== Cast ==
- Todd Grinnell as Neil
- Ali Hillis as Sarah
- Kevin Linehan as Graham
- Erin Chambers as Katie
- Alexi Wasser as Rachel
- Jeffrey Stubblefield as Jeff
- Sorel Carradine as Nikki
- Erik Stocklin as Ben
- Wes Armstrong as Kenny
- Jeremy Radin as Ross
- Jamal Thomas as Brian
- Erin Gray as Mrs. Deegan

== Release ==
The film had a limited release on May 11, 2012.

== Reception ==
The film has a 0% rating on Rotten Tomatoes based on nine reviews.

Kalvin Henely of Slant Magazine awarded the film one star out of four and wrote, "The way Nesting goes out of its way to tell us where it’s set is symptomatic of the film in general."

Dennis Harvey of Variety gave the film a negative review and wrote, "The script unfortunately suffers from its own case of arrested development, barely getting out of the gate before stalling, and never building enough laughs or narrative impetus to justify feature length."
