= Under the Bed (film) =

- Release poster
- Directed by: Steven C. Miller
- Written by: Eric Stolze
- Produced by: William Clevinger; Brad Miska
- Starring: Jonny Weston; Gattlin Griffith; Peter Holden; Musetta Vander
- Cinematography: Joseph White
- Edited by: Steven C. Miller
- Music by: Ryan Dodson
- Distributed by: XLrator Media (2013 US theatrical release)
- Release date: July 19, 2012
- Running time: 87 minutes
- Country: United States
- Language: English

Under the Bed is a 2012 American horror film directed by Steven C. Miller and starring Jonny Weston, Gattlin Griffith, Peter Holden, and Musetta Vander. It received mixed-to-negative negative reviews from film critics.

== Plot ==
Neal has been living with his aunt following the death of his mother, and it is implied that he attempted to burn their house down. He has just returned to live with his father and new stepmother Angela, and younger brother Paulie. Although everyone seems to welcome him back, his father is very hostile, and the neighborhood kids believe that Neal is crazy. Neal speaks to Paulie about the true cause of their mother's death, revealed to be a monster that lives under their bed and is only repelled by light. The monster has begun to torment Paulie as it did to Neal, and the brothers must formulate a plan to destroy it once and for all.

== Cast ==
Adapted from TV Guide.

- Jonny Weston as Neal Hausman
- Gattlin Griffith as Paulie Hausman
- Peter Holden as Terry Hausman
- Musetta Vander as Angela Hausman
- Kelcie Stranahan as Cara Evans
- Bryan Rasmussen as Mr. Evans
- Nikki Griffin as Maggie
- Tyler Steelman as Richard Evans

== Releases ==
The film was exhibited at the Fantasia International Film Festival on July 19, 2012, in Canada and at the Film4 FrightFest on August 25, 2012 in the United Kingdom. It was also shown at the ScreamFest Horror Film Festival on October 16, 2012. In Spain, it was also featured in Nocturna, Madrid International Fantastic Film Festival, on June 4, 2013. It made its DVD premiere in Germany on May 20, 2013, and in France on June 19, 2013. In the United States, a limited screening was scheduled on July 19, 2013.

== Reception ==
The film has received mixed reviews from critics and has a Rotten Tomatoes score of 50%, based on 10 reviews. Writing for The Village Voice, Nick Schager criticized Under the Bed for its confusing, 'incomprehensible' plot. Schager singled out the film's 'exaggerated' soundtrack and 'jumbled' script as negatives. Similarly, Ed Gonzalez of Slant negatively reviewed the film for its unoriginality and missed emotional potential. Andrew Pollard of Starburst had a more positive outlook on the film, praising its uniqueness and idea, while noting its poor pacing.
