= Gattlin Griffith =

American actor (born 1998)

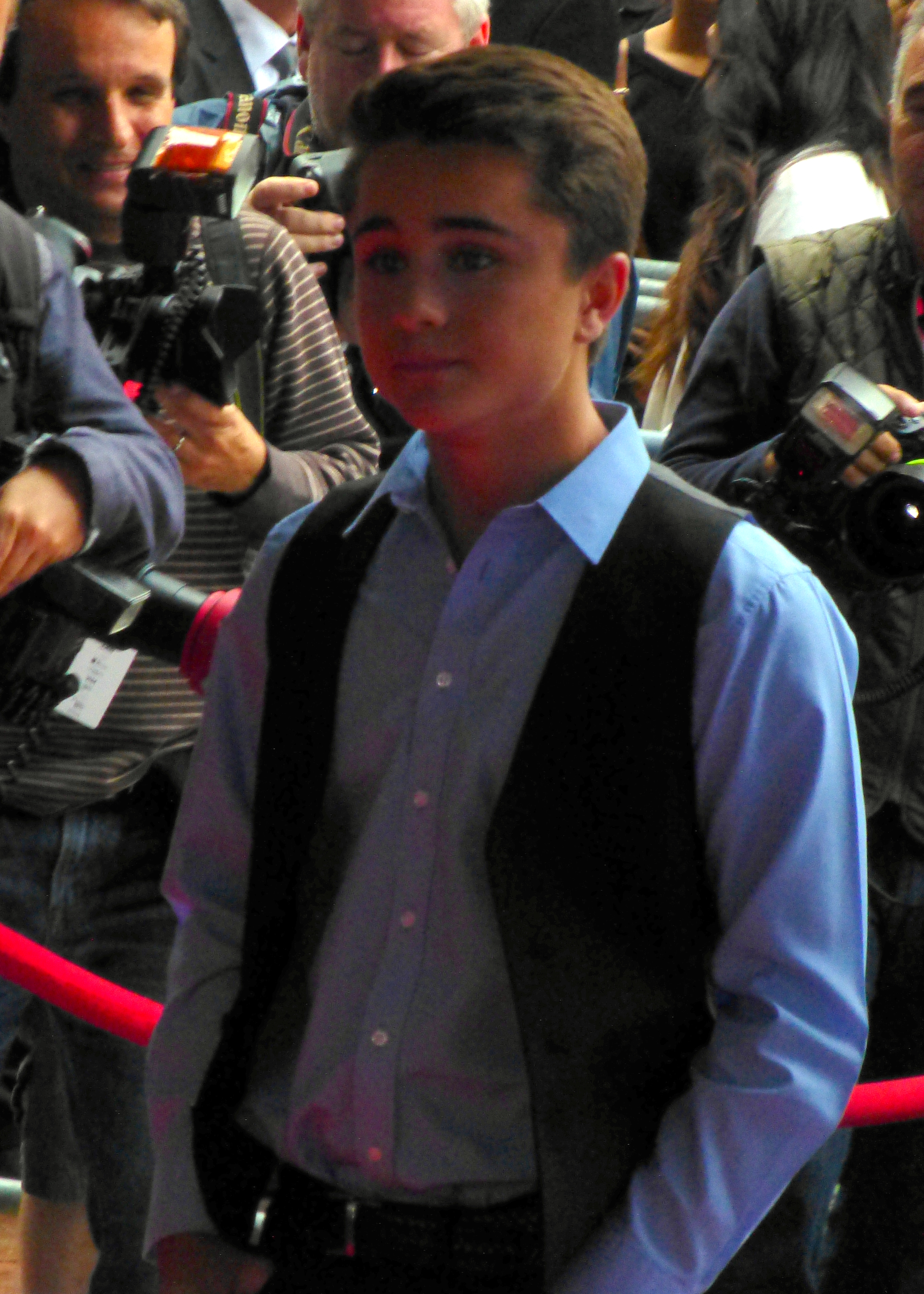
- Griffith at the 2013 Toronto International Film Festival
- Born: Gattlin Tadd Griffith; November 13, 1998 (age 27); Los Angeles, California, U.S.
- Occupation: Actor
- Years active: 2002–present

Gattlin Tadd Griffith (born November 13, 1998) is an American actor, best known for portraying Walter Collins in the historical crime drama Changeling (2008), Tim Tyson in the autobiographical civil rights film Blood Done Sign My Name (2010) and for starring in the romantic drama Labor Day (2013). He also had episodic roles on TV series such as Cold Case, Eli Stone, Supernatural, Criminal Minds and the films The New Daughter and Green Lantern.

== Life ==
Griffith was born to film stuntman Tad Griffith and wife Wendy Morrison Griffith, and is the fourth generation of a champion trick riding and equestrian gymnastics family. His paternal grandfather, Dick Griffith, is in the ProRodeo Hall of Fame and the National Cowboy Hall of Fame, and his paternal grandmother, Connie Rosenberger Griffith, is in the National Cowgirl Hall of Fame. He has three younger brothers, Callder West, Arrden Hunt and Garrison Cahill. He played football for the Santa Clarita Warriors and he attended Bishop Alemany High School class of 2017. He now attends the University of California at Los Angeles, majoring in English. He starred in the films Under the Bed and Labor Day.

== Filmography ==
=== Film ===
Year	Film	Role	Notes
2002	Reckoning	Baby	
2008	Changeling	Walter James Collins, Jr.	
2009	Uncorked	Lucas "Luke" Browning	
2009	Couples Retreat	Robert	
2009	The New Daughter	Samuel "Sam" James	
2010	Blood Done Sign My Name	Timothy "Tim" Tyson	
2010	The River Why	Bill Bob	
2011	Green Lantern	Young Harold "Hal" Jordan	
2011	A Golden Christmas 2: The Second Tail	Freddie Donovan	
2012	Under the Bed	Paulie Hausman	
2013	Labor Day	Henry	
2020	Initiation	Beau Vaughn	
2021	Catch the Bullet	Jed Blake	
2023	What Rhymes with Reason	Jesse Brandt	
2024	Horizon: An American Saga	Lt. Loftus	
2024	Joker: Folie à Deux	Masked Joker Driver	
TBD	Incoming	Shaved Head	Post-production
TBD	Reverence	Jimmy Raddix	In Production

=== Television ===
Year	Film	Role	Notes
2006	Untold Stories of the ER	Brian Bogert	Episode: "Life and Limb"
2007	Cold Case	Clayton "Clay" Hathaway	Episode: "Offender"
2007	How I Met Your Mother	Boy	Episode: "Something Blue"
2007	Monk	Matthew	Episode: "Mr. Monk and the Wrong Man"
2008	Unhitched	Helmet Boy	Episode: "Conjoined Twins Pitch No-Hitter"
2008	Eli Stone	Young Eli Stone	Episode: "Happy Birthday, Nate"
2009	Eleventh Hour	Nicholas "Nicky" Harris	Episode: "Miracle"
2009	Without a Trace	Travis Feretti	Episode: "Undertow"
2009	Supernatural	Jesse Turner	Episode: "I Believe the Children Are Our Future"
2010	Castle	Tyler Donegal	Episode: "Murder Most Fowl"
2010	Criminal Minds	Robert Brooks	Episode: "Into the Woods"
2022	Star Trek: Picard	Mugger	Episode: "Assimilation"
2022	The Boys	Gunpowder	Recurring role; 3 episodes

=== Commercials ===
- Home Depot as Jake/Son
- Yamaha as Son
- Mass Mutual as Brother
- Disney Parks as Boy
- Burger King (2009) as Boy (3 Commercials)
