= Initiation (2020 film) =

American horror thriller film

- Theatrical release poster
- Directed by: John Berardo
- Written by: John Berardo; Lindsay LaVanchy; Brian Frager
- Produced by: Brian Frager; John Berardo; J. P. Castel; Lindsay LaVanchy; Stephanie Stanziano; Jon Huertas
- Starring: Jon Huertas; Isabella Gomez; Lindsay LaVanchy; Froy Gutierrez; Gattlin Griffith; Patrick Walker; James Berardo; Bart Johnson; Shireen Lai; Kent Faulcon; Yancy Butler; Lochlyn Munro
- Cinematography: Jonathan Pope
- Edited by: Kristina E. Lyons
- Music by: Alexander Arntzen
- Production companies: XYZ Films; Shatterproof Films
- Distributed by: Saban Films
- Release dates: October 8, 2020 (Screamfest); May 7, 2021 (United States)
- Running time: 96 minutes
- Country: United States
- Language: English

Initiation (stylized as Init!ation) is a 2020 American slasher film directed, co-produced, and co-written by John Berardo, inspired by his short film Dembanger, described as an edgy slasher about a cruel social media game that gets twisted out of control and takes place at a university where a masked serial killer is murdering teenagers.

It stars Jon Huertas, Isabella Gomez, Lindsay LaVanchy, Froy Gutierrez, Gattlin Griffith, Patrick Walker, James Berardo, Bart Johnson, Shireen Lai, Kent Faulcon, Yancy Butler, and Lochlyn Munro. The film premiered at the Screamfest Horror Film Festival on October 8, 2020. It was released on May 7, 2021 by Saban Films.

== Plot ==
During a homecoming party, a sorority member named Kylie is found unconscious and alone in a room with three members of Sigma Nu Pi, Beau, Dylan, and Wes. The following morning, she is cruelly mocked on social media. Kylie seeks out help from fellow sorority member Shayleen, who in turn approaches Ellery, another sorority member. Ellery agrees to investigate, particularly as Wes is her brother and he has been previously accused of sexual assault.

Wes is murdered by an unknown assailant and his body is discovered by Dylan and Beau. In the following days, Wes is lionized by the university chancellor Van Horn, who highlights Wes's prowess at swimming and his lost potential. The murder is investigated by Detective Sandra Fitzgerald and Officer Rico Martinez, the latter of whom discovers that Wes's previous case of sexual assault had been covered up by Van Horn. Soon after, Dylan and Beau are also murdered by the unknown assailant.

Ellery attends a meeting with Van Horn, who is angry that she has been investigating the sexual assault. After she leaves the murderer traps Van Horn in his office and murders him. Meanwhile, Ellery has rejoined Kylie and the two witness the murder, causing the murderer to chase after them. The resulting chase ends with the women stabbing the killer, who is revealed to be Martinez, Kylie's father. He had been motivated to murder Wes and the others after learning that the fraternity had committed similar rapes and other crimes, which the university had covered up.

== Cast ==
- Lindsay LaVanchy as Ellery Scott
- Isabella Gomez as Kylie
- Shireen Lai as Shayleen Zhou
- Froy Gutierrez as Wes Scott
- Gattlin Griffith as Beau Vaughn
- Yancy Butler as Detective Sandra Fitzgerald
- Jon Huertas as Officer Rico Martinez
- Lochlyn Munro as Bruce Van Horn
- Patrick Reginald Walker as Malik
- Bart Johnson as Coach Miles Cooper
- Maxwell Hamilton as Tyler Harrington
- Kent Faulcon as Chief Adam Tahan
- Mel Fair as Brett Vaughn
- Debra De Liso as Dana Thompson
- James Berardo as Dylan
- Adin Kolansky as Alvin
- Shalini Bathina as Meera Medan
- Nick Ballard as Tad Rivers
- Betsy Hume as Jean Reeves

== Development ==
Initiation is based on the short film Dembanger, which Berardo created as a class assignment while he was attending the University of Southern California. The assignment was to create a "short film that dealt with social change". Berardo chose social media after viewing the ease with which people could create a profile on Facebook and how widespread its usage was. The short film explored the dangers of putting out too much personal information on social media.

Berardo wanted to expand the short into a full-length film after seeing the release of the 2014 film Unfriended, but wanted to explore the topic of social media differently. He also wanted to avoid using some of the common slasher tropes, as he felt that they were "inherently misogynistic; a giant man with a phallic sharp thing chasing a half-naked girl who's too stupid to be going out the front door when she's going up the stairs, it's insulting."

== Release ==
Initiation was originally scheduled to premiere at SXSW on March 13, 2020, under the title Dembanger, but the festival was cancelled due to the COVID-19 pandemic. The film had its US premiere at the 2020 Screamfest Film Festival and its off-shore premiere at the 2020 Sitges Film Festival.

In June 2020, Saban Films acquired North American distribution rights to Initiation. The film was released in theaters and through digital and on-demand platforms on May 7, 2021.

== Reception ==
On review aggregator website Rotten Tomatoes, the film has an approval rating of 59% based on 29 reviews, with an average rating of 5.6/10. The site's critics' consensus reads: "Although Initiation struggles to balance its gorier goals against the story's social commentary, that added maturity makes this slasher a slight cut above."

Cath Clarke, writing for The Guardian, gave the film a score of 2 out of 5 stars. She described the film as "a trashy, slashy horror movie that takes the issue of sexual assault on campus, removes a few layers of complexity and adds a masked serial killer armed with a power drill", and added: "Kylie, the alleged victim, gets a couple of scenes, necessary for the plot, but otherwise, there’s practically zero interest in what she’s going through." Adam Graham of The Detroit News described the film as "a standard issue horror offering where frat boys and sorority girls are picked off faster than you can set up a game of beer pong." He concluded: "Don't bother trying to figure out whodunnit because the revelation makes no sense."

Gregory Lawrence of Collider was more positive in his review of the film, giving it a grade of A−. He described it as "a unique indie horror-thriller, one with an unprecedented sense of maturity in its filmmaking and thematic aims, even as it gives you the visceral scares you want and need", and concluded: "Initiation is quite the low budget genre marvel, a propulsive yet patient thriller that cares deeply, yet ruthlessly, about its characters."
