= The Mannequin =

2025 horror film

- Film poster
- Directed by: John Berardo
- Written by: John Berardo
- Starring: Isabella Gomez
- Production company: Shatterproof Films
- Distributed by: Jackrabbit Media
- Release dates: August 24, 2025 (FrightFest); October 13, 2025 (Screamfest Horror Film Festival)
- Running time: 85 minutes
- Country: United States
- Language: English

The Mannequin is a 2025 supernatural horror film written and directed by John Berardo and starring Isabella Gomez.

== Premise ==
Sophia and her sister Liana rent a large studio space that was once a mannequin factory. Inside they find several items left behind by the previous tenant, including a creepy mannequin.

== Cast ==
- Isabella Gomez as Liana Rojas
- Krystle Martin as Ruth Calvert
- Lindsay LaVanchy as Hazel Miller
- Shireen Lai as Nadine Yang
- Jack Sochet as Jack Bernard
- Trevor LaPaglia as Mark Sonnenberg
- John Berardo as Building Manager
- Gabriella Rivera as Sophia Rojas

== Release ==
The Mannequin premiered at FrightFest London on August 24, 2025. It premiered in the United States on October 13, 2025 as part of the Screamfest Horror Film Festival.

=== Critical reception ===
On the review aggregator website Rotten Tomatoes, 68% of 19 critics' reviews are positive. Bee Delores of Bloody Disgusting gave the film a mildly positive review, saying that it "mostly works", even with "clichéd imagery we've seen dozens of times before." Mary Beth McAndrews of Dread Central gave the film 3.5 stars out of 5, calling it "a standout supernatural slasher in a world that's seeing a resurgence in the subgenre". Matthew Turner of Blunt Magazine called it "an engaging horror story that gets the job done", while noting that it's "both uneven and a little underdeveloped."
