= Gloria Calderón Kellett =

American writer and actress (born 1975)

Gloria Calderon Kellett
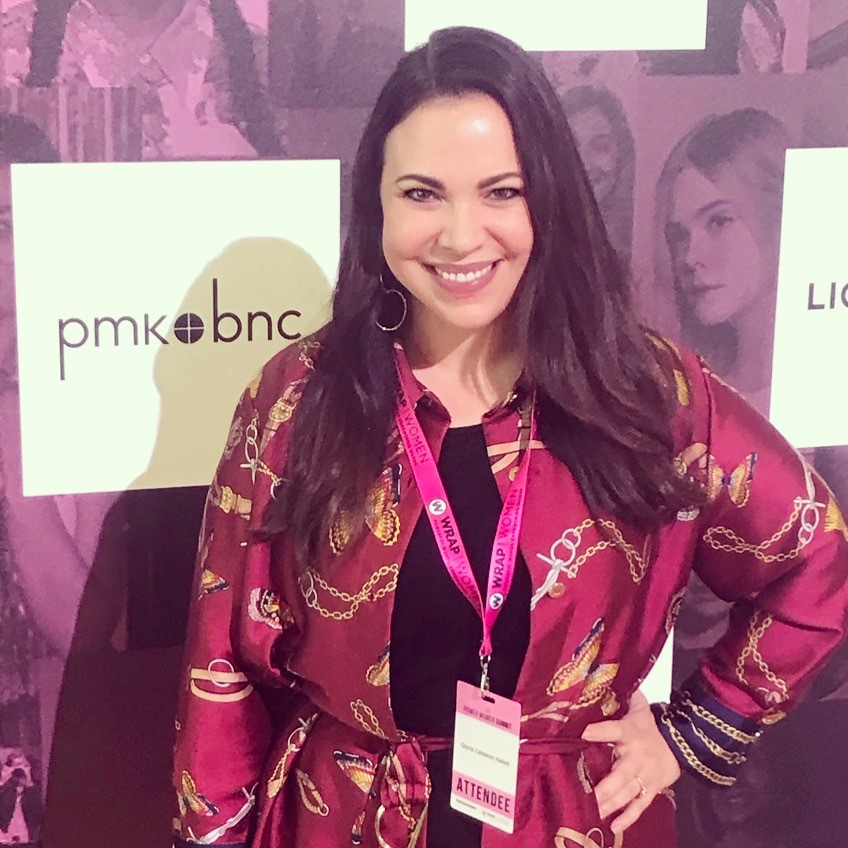
- Born: April 11, 1975 (age 51); Portland, Oregon
- Education: Loyola Marymount University; Goldsmiths, University of London
- Notable work: One Day at a Time
- Spouse: Dave Kellett (m. 2001)
- Children: 2

Gloria Calderón Kellett (born April 11, 1975) is an American writer, producer, director and actress.

She is best known as the executive producer, co-creator, co-showrunner, director, and actress on the sitcom One Day at a Time. Her Amazon Original series, With Love, is the first series coming out of a deal between her company, Glonation and Amazon Studios. Along with Blumhouse Television and Spotify, Glonation is also producing The Horror of Dolores Roach based on the Gimlet podcast.

The daughter of Cuban immigrants, Calderón Kellett graduated from Loyola Marymount University and went on to earn a master's degree in Theatre from the University of London. She spent her early years as a writer/producer on shows including Devious Maids, Rules of Engagement, and How I Met Your Mother. Her acting credits include Jane the Virgin, Angie Tribeca, Dead to Me, How I Met Your Mother, and One Day at a Time. She also appeared as a narrator on Drunk History (New Orleans). In directing, Calderón Kellett has worked on episodes of One Day at a Time, Mr. Iglesias, Merry Happy Whatever, United We Fall, and the Mad About You revival. Her first feature film We Were There, Too co-written by Natasha Rothwell is set up at HBO Max.

== Early life and education ==
Kellett was born in Portland, Oregon on April 11, 1975. She is Cuban in ancestry. Kellett grew up in Beaverton, Oregon and San Diego, California. She graduated from University of San Diego High School. Kellett graduated from Loyola Marymount University in 1997 with a BA in Communications and Theater Arts. She also attended courses at the Writers Boot Camp in Santa Monica, CA.

Kellett was awarded a Kennedy Center/ACTF Achievement in Playwriting Award for her first play, Plane Strangers, which also went on to win the Del Rey Players Achievement in Playwriting Award, and the LMU Playwright of the Year Award. Kellett went on to earn an MA in Theatre from Goldsmith College, University of London. Her play, When Words Are Many was a finalist for the London Writers Award (Waterstone's Prize). Her co-authored play Dance Like No One's Looking won the International Student Playscript Competition, judged and awarded by Sir Alan Ayckbourn. While in London, she worked at the Royal Court Theater and LIFT (the London International Festival of Theatre).

== Career ==
Since her return to Los Angeles, Kellett has been a founding member of the sketch comedy group And Donkey Makes Five, and has written and performed stand-up comedy at The Improv and The Comedy Store. In a successful screenplay collaboration, Kellett's script Passengers and Drivers made it to the semi-finalist round of the first Project Greenlight Competition and she worked for Academy Award-winning writer/director Cameron Crowe on Vanilla Sky.

Kellett was a writer, actress (episode "The Wedding Bride"), executive story editor, and co-producer on the CBS series, How I Met Your Mother, for which she was won an ALMA Award for Outstanding Script in a Drama or Comedy. She has been a writer and supervising producer and writer on the CBS series, Rules of Engagement, on Lifetime's Devious Maids and on ABC's Mixology, the CW series, iZombie and the ABC series, United We Fall. She is the co-showrunner of One Day at a Time which was released on Netflix for the first three seasons, and is currently airing its fourth season on Pop TV. Along with the other writers, producers and the cast, she helped to pitch the show to other networks to ensure the show did not end.

She has also acted in several shows such as Trophy Wife, Jane the Virgin, Dead to Me, and One Day at a Time.

Her professional directorial debut was on her show One Day at a Time and she has gone on to direct several other episodes. She has also directed for Mr. Iglesias, also on Netflix.

Kellett was previously a lecturer in Screenwriting at Loyola Marymount University's School of Film and Television.

== Advocacy ==
Gloria is a champion for women, the Latino community and other disenfranchised voices. She is an executive committee member for The Television Academy. She assisted Amazon in supporting their inaugural Inclusion Playbook - providing a template for how to make content in an inclusive and responsible way. Her advocacy includes being a founding member of the UNTITLED LATINX PROJECT, a group of Latine show runners who advocate on behalf of the Latine community (by such efforts as the Dear Hollywood initiative) to help studios identify ways to support and tell Latine stories. As an ambassador for the non-profit ReFrame, which celebrates and encourages gender parity in front of and behind the camera and a partner with the Latinx House/Adelante she supported up and coming Latina directors and DPs by having them shadow on the set of With Love on Season 2. Alongside the Latino Film Institute, LACollab and Amazon she also mentors with The Youth Cinema Project to strengthen the Latino pipeline to Hollywood. Her mentor efforts also include working with the Pillars Artist Fellows, co-founded by Riz Ahmed to support Muslim writers and directors. To offer free advice to new artists at the beginning of their careers, she partnered with Buzzfeed's Perolike to release a web series titled: “Hollywood 101”.

She is a member of The Creative Coalition where she fights to support the arts and arts programs by going to DC and meeting with members of congress to encourage their support for the National Endowment for the Arts and is the chair for their Pay Gap Initiative which gives grants of 10k to entry level BIPOC candidates to help them start their Hollywood journey. As an Ambassador for the National Women's History Museum, she is focused on highlighting the countless untold stories of women throughout history. As a part of the Celebrity Ambassador Cabinet for The National Hispanic Media Coalition, she supports their woman-led non-profit civil and human rights organization founded to eliminate hate, discrimination, and racism toward the Latino community. She's also a part of the Creative Council for Emily's List which is the nation's largest resource dedicated to electing Democratic women to office and the Creative Council for Vote Mama Foundation which is the leading source of research and analysis about the political participation of moms.

Gloria is also an industry advocate for greening Hollywood and has partnered with Scriptation to come up with solutions to make a positive environmental impact and reduce Hollywood's carbon footprint while also advocating for stories about the environment on TV.

Awards for her work include The Television Academy Honors, The Geffen TrailBlazer Award, Mental Health America Media Award, ALMA Award, Imagen Award, Vanguard Award, NHMC Award, Sentinel Award, and The Voice Award. She has been honored as an industry leader by The Hollywood Reporter in their Top Women in Entertainment issue, the THR100 list issue, and their 50 Agents of Change issue.

== Personal life ==
Kellett met cartoonist Dave Kellett, creator of the webcomic Sheldon, in high school. The couple married on February 24, 2001. They have two children.

== Authored works ==
Her book, Accessories - 30 Monologues for Women has been translated into Italian and is published by Small Fish Studios in the U.S. and Cassini Press in Italy.
