= Todd Grinnell =

American actor (born 1976)

- Born: Todd A. Grinnell; March 29, 1976 (age 49); Massachusetts, United States
- Occupation: Actor
- Years active: 2002–present
- Spouse: India de Beaufort (m. 2015)
- Children: 1

Todd A. Grinnell (born March 29, 1976) is an American actor, known for playing Jason in the series Four Kings and for playing building superintendent Schneider in the Netflix original sitcom One Day at a Time, based on the 1970s sitcom of the same name.

== Personal life ==
On August 29, 2015, Grinnell married actress India de Beaufort. They have a son together, born 2018.

== Filmography ==
=== Film ===
Year	Title	Role	Notes
2002	Lost Soul		
2004	The Dangling Conversation	Tommy Peters	Short film
2006	Hollywoodland	Times reporter	
2010	Hysteria	Andy	
2011	Dorfman in Love	Hugh	
2011	Blind	John	Short film
2012	Nesting	Neil	
2014	Stripped	Mr. Spokesman	Documentary film
2021	Paradise Cove	Knox Bannett	
2022	The Time Capsule	Jack	

=== Television ===
Year	Title	Role	Notes
2005	Love, Inc.	Gavin	Episode: "Mad About You"
2006	Four Kings	Jason	Main cast
2006	Robot Chicken	Oscar / Kraken (voices)	Episode: "The Munnery"
2006	The Game	Kyle	Episode: "The Rules of the Game"
2006	Robot Chicken	Guy in grotto (voice)	Episode: "Drippy Pony"
2007	Criminal Minds	Dennis Kyle	Episode: "The Big Game"
2007	The Dukes of Hazzard: The Beginning	Hughie Hogg	Television film
2007	The Wedding Bells	Simon Eldred	Episode: "Fools in Love"
2007	It's Always Sunny in Philadelphia	Sage	Episode: "The Gang Finds a Dumpster Baby"
2007	Samantha Who?	Nathan	Episode: "The Restraining Order"
2007	Cold Case	Zip Fellig (1953)	Episode: "Pin Up Girl"
2008–2009	Eli Stone	Anthony Gibbons	2 episodes
2008–2009, 2011	Desperate Housewives	Alex Cominis	Recurring role (season 5), guest (season 7)
2009	Parks and Recreation	Nate	2 episodes
2009	Brothers	Bruce	Episode: "Meet Mike Trainor/Assistant Coach"
2010	Lie to Me	Trevor Addison	Episode: "Bullet Bump"
2011	Human Target	Bob Anderson	Episode: "Kill Bob"
2011	The Mentalist	Jonathan Flint	Episode: "Pretty Red Balloon"
2011	Rules of Engagement	Chris	Episode: "Shy Dial"
2011	How I Met Your Mother	Duane	Episode: "Symphony of Illumination"
2012	Jane by Design	Mr. Hunter	4 episodes
2012	The Glades	Donald Glandon	Episode: "The Naked Truth"
2012	Revenge	Dr. Jeffrey Thomas	2 episodes
2012	Vegas	Andy Meacham	Episode: "Solid Citizens"
2013	Nikita	Dale Gordon	Episode: "Wanted"
2014	Reckless	Gavin Hope	Episode: "Stand Your Ground"
2015	Battle Creek	Max Archer	Episode: "Mama's Boy"
2015	Hot in Cleveland	Nicky	Episode: "All About Elka"
2015–2016	Grace and Frankie	Stephen	3 episodes
2016	Dr. Ken	Dr. Mitch Tuttle	Episode: "The Wedding Sitter"
2016	The Young Pope	Deacon Kurtwell	Episode: "Episode 9"
2017–2020	One Day at a Time	Dwayne Patrick "Pat" Schneider	Main cast
2017	Lethal Weapon	Jerry Johnson	Episode: "Fork-Getta-Bout-It"
2021-2023	With Love	Dr. Miles Murphy	Main cast

=== Web ===
Year	Title	Role	Notes
2009	Brainstorm	Rock Shanz	8 episodes
2010	Sweety	Mr. Derek Tozer	3 episodes
