= Isabella Gomez =

Colombian-American actress (born 1998)

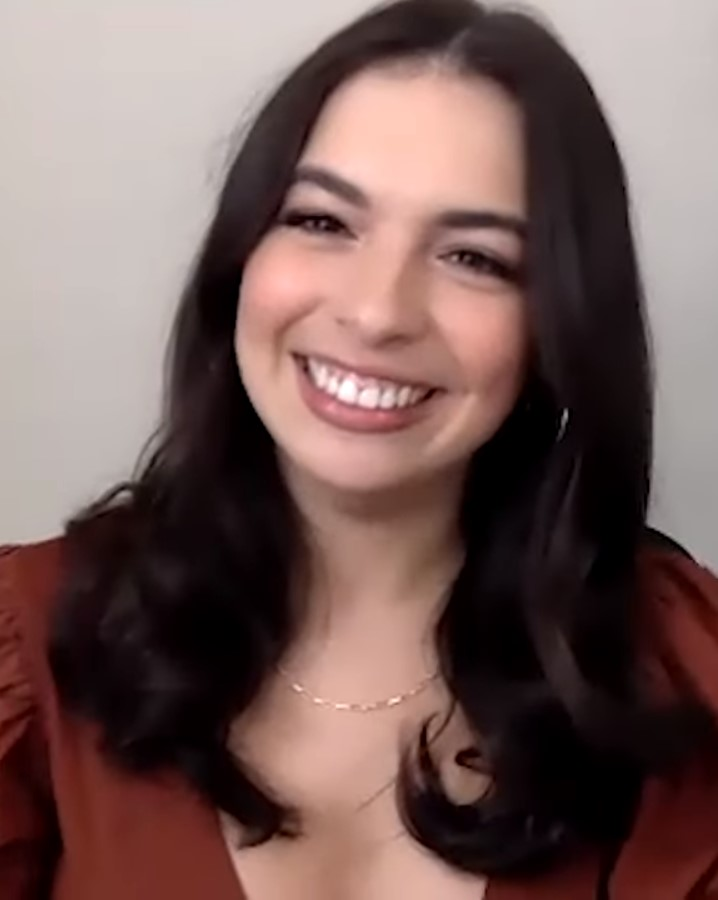
- Gomez (2021)
- Born: 1998 (age 27–28); Medellín, Colombia
- Occupation: Actress
- Years active: 2014–present

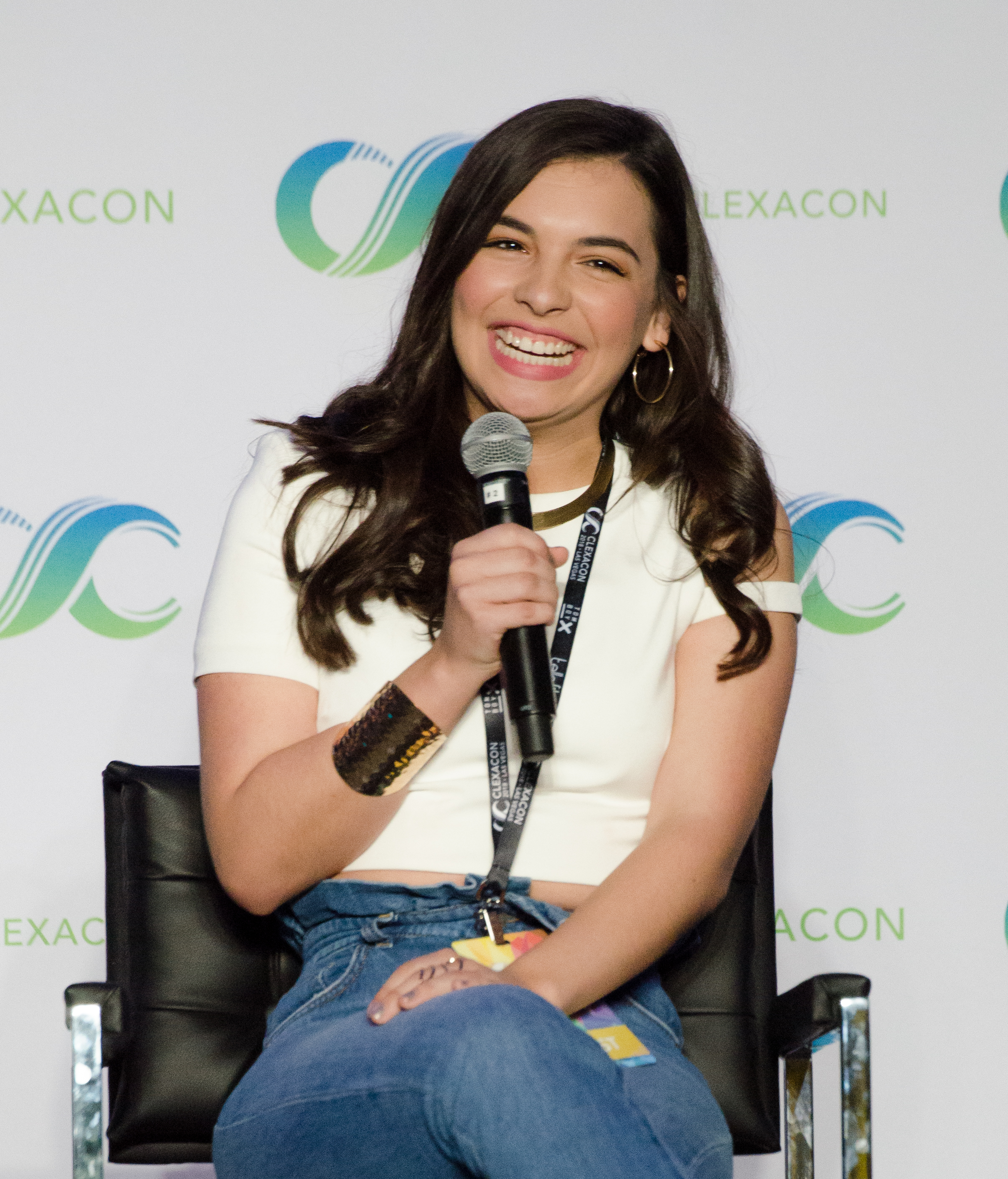
Gomez at ClexaCon 2018

Isabella Gomez is a Colombian-American actress, best known for starring in One Day at a Time. She has previously had minor roles in Modern Family and Matador. She was later cast in a starring role in HBO Max's Head of the Class, the revival of the former ABC '80s sitcom television series of the same name, which premiered in October 2021.

== Early life ==
Gomez was born in Medellín, Colombia, in 1998. She began acting in commercials at the age of five. Her family immigrated to Orlando, Florida, when she was ten years old. There, she received lessons from a vocal coach to help moderate her accent. In 2015, her family moved to Los Angeles to pursue an acting career.

== Career ==
In 2020, Gomez was awarded an Impact Award by the National Hispanic Media Coalition for "Outstanding Performance in a Television Series" on the One Day at a Time reboot on Netflix and Pop. She went on to play the role of Alicia Gomez in Head of the Class, which was cancelled in 2021 after one season. In 2022, she was added to Season 10 of The Goldbergs as recurring character Carmen.

== Filmography ==
=== Film ===
Year	Title	Role	Notes
2019	A Cinderella Story: Christmas Wish	Isla	Direct-to-video
2020	Initiation	Kylie	
2021	Jelly	Emmie	Short film
2022	Aristotle and Dante Discover the Secrets of the Universe	Gina Navarro	
2023	Royal Rendezvous	Catalina Gonzalez	
2025	The Mannequin	Liana Rojas	

=== Television ===
Year	Title	Role	Notes
2014	Matador	Cristina Sandoval	7 episodes
2016	Modern Family	Flavia	Episode: "The Party"
2017–2020	One Day at a Time	Elena Alvarez	Main role
2019–2020	Big Hero 6: The Series	Megan Cruz (voice)	Recurring: Season 2
2019	Star vs. the Forces of Evil	Teenage Mariposa Diaz (voice)	Episode: "Gone Baby Gone"
2021	Head of the Class	Alicia Gomez	Main role
2023	The Goldbergs	Carmen	Recurring: Season 10
2024	Moon Girl and Devil Dinosaur	Cecelia (voice)	3 episodes
2026	Shrinking	Marisol	Recurring: Season 3

== Awards and nominations ==
Award	Year	Category	Work	Result
Imagen Awards	2017	Best Supporting Actress – Television	One Day at a Time	Won
Imagen Awards	2018	Best Supporting Actress – Television	One Day at a Time	Nominated
Imagen Awards	2019	Best Supporting Actress – Television	One Day at a Time	Nominated
Imagen Awards	2020	Best Supporting Actress – Television	One Day at a Time	Nominated
