= List of Episcopal Academy people =

This list of Episcopal Academy people includes important faculty and alumni of Episcopal Academy, a co-educational school for grades Pre-K through 12 located in Newtown Square, Pennsylvania.

== Alumni ==
=== Art and media ===
- Anthony Apesos - painter, critic, and professor of Fine Arts at the Art Institute of Boston
- Lionel Barrymore - actor, Academy Award winner for his role in A Free Soul, and nominee for Best Director for Madame X
- John Carradine - actor
- Richard Harding Davis - author, journalist, managing director of Harper's Weekly
- Morrison Heckscher - art historian and long-time curator of the American Wing at the Metropolitan Museum of Art
- Mark Kendall - artist and filmmaker, La Camioneta; recipient of the Guggenheim Fellowship and the Pew Fellowships in the Arts
- Jennifer Lame - film editor; recipient of the Academy Award for Best Film Editing for her work on Oppenheimer
- R.W.B. Lewis - long-time professor of English at Yale, and winner of the Pulitzer Prize for biography
- Robert A. Masciantonio - writer and director of cult films Cold Hearts, Neighbor
- Henry Plumer McIlhenny - art collector and curator of the Philadelphia Museum of Art
- Maury Henry Biddle Paul - gossip columnist known as "Cholly Knickerbocker"
- M. Night Shyamalan - film producer and director, The Sixth Sense, Unbreakable, The Village, The Lady in the Water, Signs, Split, Glass, Old, Knock at the Cabin; multiple Academy Award nominee
- Sarah Steele, 2006 - actress, performing in Spanglish; has appeared on The Good Fight, The Good Wife, Law & Order and Gossip Girl
- Robert Venturi, 1944 - Pritzker Prize-winning architect and postmodern theorist

=== Athletics ===
- Jerome Allen - former professional basketball player with Minnesota Timberwolves, Indiana Pacers, and Denver Nuggets and current Detroit Pistons assistant coach; was also head coach for Penn Quakers men's basketball and an assistant coach for the Boston Celtics
- Eddie Collins Jr.- former professional baseball player with Philadelphia Athletics and former history teacher and squash and baseball coach at Episcopal Academy
- Brian Dougherty - professional lacrosse player, inducted into the US Lacrosse Hall of Fame in 2012
- Kyle Eckel - former professional football player with US Naval Academy, New England Patriots, Philadelphia Eagles, Miami Dolphins, Denver Broncos and New Orleans Saints; won Super Bowl XLIV with the Saints
- Wayne Ellington - former professional basketball player with the Los Angeles Lakers, New York Knicks, Minnesota Timberwolves, Miami Heat, Cleveland Cavaliers, Brooklyn Nets, Detroit Pistons, Memphis Grizzlies, Dallas Mavericks, North Carolina Tar Heels men's basketball and current Miami Heat assistant coach
- James "Bruiser" Flint - assistant coach of the Arkansas Razorbacks men's basketball team and former head coach of the Drexel Dragons men's basketball team and the UMass Minutemen basketball team; also assistant coach of the Kentucky Wildcats men's basketball team, Indiana Hoosiers men's basketball team, UMass Minutemen basketball team and Coppin State Eagles men's basketball team
- Matt Freese - professional soccer player with the New York City FC and United States Men's National Soccer Team and formerly Philadelphia Union
- Todd Harrity - former professional squash player, highest world ranking was #34, 3-time American champion, CSA champion while with Princeton Tigers men's squash team
- Gerald Henderson, Jr. - former professional basketball player with the Philadelphia 76ers, Portland Trail Blazers, Charlotte Hornets, Charlotte Bobcats and Duke Blue Devils men's basketball
- Greg Isdaner - football player, West Virginia Mountaineers football, Dallas Cowboys and Philadelphia Eagles
- Donald Lippincott - Olympic athlete
- AJ Marcucci - professional soccer player with the New York Red Bulls
- Nick Mead - Team USA rower, won Olympic gold medal in the coxless men's four in the Paris 2024 games; also rowed for the Princeton Tigers; his men's eight event team finished in fourth place in the Tokyo 2020 Summer Olympics
- George Munger - former head coach of the Penn Quakers football team; selected to the College Football Hall of Fame in 1976

=== Business and technology ===
- Britton Chance, Jr. - naval architect, designed winners of the America's Cup and the World Cup
- George David - chairman and CEO of United Technologies Corporation
- John Haas - former chairman of Rohm and Haas Company
- Mark Hoplamazian CBE - president and CEO of Hyatt Hotels Corporation
- Gayle Laakman McDowell - founder, consultant, coder, speaker and author of Cracking the Coding Interview
- Spencer Penrose - mining magnate, hotelier, philanthropist
- Peter York Solmssen - former general counsel and managing board member of Siemans AG
- Brian Tierney - Republican strategist; CEO of Philadelphia Media Holdings
- Charles L. Tutt, Sr. - real estate and mining magnate
- Robert Venturi - architect and winner of the Pritzker Prize; designed the academy's chapel in Newtown Square
- Edward Vick - retired chairman and CEO of Young and Rubicam

=== Government ===
- John C. Bell, Jr. - former governor of Pennsylvania; chief justice of the Pennsylvania Supreme Court
- Tilton E. Doolittle - former United States attorney for the district of Connecticut, and speaker of the Connecticut House of Representatives
- Ralph Earle (1928–2020) - diplomat and arms control negotiator
- Alan Lukens - former United States ambassador to the Republic of the Congo
- Boies Penrose - senator, political boss
- Benjamin Read - former under secretary of state under President Jimmy Carter
- John Yoo - professor of law at the Boalt Hall School of Law, University of California, Berkeley; former deputy assistant attorney general in the Office of Legal Counsel of the U.S. Department of Justice during the first term of the George W. Bush presidential administration; principal author of the "torture memo"

== Faculty ==
- John Andrews, D.D. - the academy's first headmaster
- Noah Webster - lexicographer, textbook pioneer, English-language spelling reformer, political writer, editor, and prolific author; the "father of American scholarship and education"; taught at Episcopal Academy for six months from April 1787

== Others ==
- Randolph Greenfield Adams (1892–1951) - librarian and historian
- Garry Davis - founder of the World Service Authority and creator of the first World Passport
- Daniel A. Baugh (1931-2024) - Historian of 18th century British naval administration.

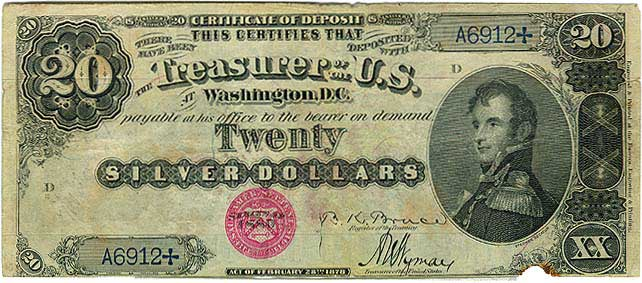
Stephen Decatur as depicted on an 1886 Silver Certificate

- Stephen Decatur - naval commander during the First Barbary War, Second Barbary War, and War of 1812, youngest man to reach the rank of Navy captain; namesake of 5 Navy ships, 46 US towns and cities, three US schools, and one school in Sigonella, Italy; the face on the 1886 Silver Certificate, equivalent to our $20 bill. Although tradition at Episcopal Academy continues to claim Decatur as an alumnus, even assigning him to the class of 1797, no documentary evidence links him to the school.
- William Chauncey Emhardt - Episcopal priest and ecumenist
- Spike Eskin - radio personality for WIP-FM
- Lindley Miller Garrison
- Henry George - political economist and author of Progress and Poverty
- John Charles Groome
- Charles Stewart - with one ship he captured two British ships in the War of 1812, in 1836 captured a Portuguese slaver ship as it came into Havana, serving 63 years became the U.S. Navy's first flag officer.
- William White - first and fourth presiding bishop of the Episcopal Church in the U.S.; first bishop of Pennsylvania; Academy founder; chaplain to the Continental Congress and the United States Senate
