= Christopher Wiehl =

American actor

- Born: Christopher Richard Wiehl; October 29, 1970 (age 55); Yakima, Washington, U.S.
- Occupation: Actor
- Years active: 1995-present

Christopher Wiehl (born October 29, 1970) is an American actor.

== Life and career ==
Wiehl was born in Yakima, Washington and is of Danish and German descent. His father, Dick Wiehl, was an agent with the Federal Bureau of Investigation (FBI). He graduated from the University of Washington with a Bachelor of Arts degree in dramatic arts. He is the younger brother of author and Fox News Channel legal analyst Lis Wiehl.

Wiehl starred in several plays during college including Henry V, The Owl and the Pussycat and Lonestar.

His most prominent role has been as the quarterback Derek McConnell in ESPN's short-lived series Playmakers. Wiehl has made guest appearances on television shows including Popular, CSI: Crime Scene Investigation, Birds of Prey and Charmed (for the episode Animal Pragmatism). He had a spotlight role in the 2000 film Broken Hearts Club as J.Crew Guy. He also played a small role in the movie Can't Hardly Wait.

Wiehl was a guest star on Buffy the Vampire Slayer during season one, in the role of "Owen" in the episode "Never Kill a Boy on the First Date". He also played a police officer in Hollywood Homicide in 2003 as "Cheeseburger Cop".

In 2006, he played Jake Dunne on Love Monkey. He had a recurring role as Roger on Jericho. He plays art gallery owner Patrick on Switched at Birth.

== Filmography ==
=== Films ===
Year	Film	Role	Director	Notes
1998	Gunshy	Tim	Jeff Celentano	
1998	Girl	Mark	Jonathan Kahn	Credited as Chris Weihl (sic)
1998	Can't Hardly Wait	Horny Guy	Deborah Kaplan	Credited as Chris Wiehl
1998	Yakima Wash		Gene Bernard	
1998	My Engagement Party	Tom	Christopher Heisen	
1999	Cold Hearts	Charles	Robert A. Masciantonio	
2000	The Broken Hearts Club: A Romantic Comedy	J. Crew Guy	Greg Berlanti	Credited as Chris Wiehl
2003	Dry Cycle	Roy	Isaac H. Eaton	Credited as Chris Wiehl
2003	Hollywood Homicide	Cheeseburger Cop	Ron Shelton	
2003	The Groomsmen	Jay	Lawrence Gay	
2010	Mad Dog and the Flyboy	Mad Dog	Christopher Rausch	Short film
2014	Shoulder to Shoulder	Cole	Dan Dieffenbach	Short film
2015	Monsters	Henry	Steve Desmond	Short film
2016	The Devil's Dolls	Matt	Padraig Reynolds	
2021	60 Seconds	Dixon	John "Quig" Quigley	Short film
2022	Motorvation	James	Angus Benfield	

=== Television ===
Year(s)	Title	Role(s)	Notes
1995	JAG	Sgt. Barnes	S1E6 "Pilot Error"
1995	Space: Above and Beyond	Ensign	S1E11 "The River of Stars"
1996	Night Stand with Dick Dietrick	Tad	S1E43 "Greek Dreams". Credited as Chris Wiehl
1997	Dark Skies	Nat Heller	S1E10 "The Last Wave"
1997	Buffy the Vampire Slayer	Owen Thurman	S1E5 "Never Kill a Boy on the First Date"
1997	Wings	Shawn Palmer	S8E21 "Oedipus Wrecks"
1997	Cybill	Karate Instructor	S4E6 "Earthquake"
1997	Boy Meets World	Dexter	S5E5 "The Witches of Pennbrook". Credited as Chris Wiehl
1997	Jenny	Jeremy	S1E6 "A Girl's Gotta Lie"
1998	Clueless	Chad	S2E17 "Life Is a Beach"
1998	Any Day Now	Carter Trent	S1E2 "Huh?" Credited as Chris Wiehl
1998	Early Edition	Eric Van Owen	S3E4 "Lt. Hobson, U.S.N."
1998	Bronx County		TV movie
1999	Pensacola: Wings of Gold	Swamp	6 episodes
1999	Mutiny		TV movie
1999	Payne	Eric	S1E6 "Trouble in Room 206"
1999	Popular	Leo Ferrara	S1E5 "Slumber Party Massacre"; S1E8 "Tonight's the Night"
2000	Charmed	The Snake	S2E13 "Animal Pragmatism"
2000	ER	Mr. Lattimer	S6E20 "Loose Ends"
2000–2001	Bull	Carson Boyd	Main role; 20 episodes
2001	Touched by an Angel	Billy	S8E4 "Manhunt"
2001–2003	CSI: Crime Scene Investigation	Hank Peddigrew	7 episodes
2002	First Monday	Jerry Klein	Main role; 13 episodes
2003	Birds of Prey	Jack Barrett	S1E11 "Reunion"
2003	Monk	Scott Gregorio	S2E3 "Mr. Monk Goes to the Ballgame"
2003	Playmakers	Derek McConnell	Main role; 11 episodes
2004	Clubhouse	Kenny Baines	S1E1 "Pilot"; S1E4 "Trade Talks"
2004	Revenge of the Middle-Aged Woman	Young Nathan	TV movie
2005	North Shore	Greg Lasser	S1E19 "Shark"
2005–2008	Las Vegas	James Riley; Kyle Aldridge	S2E15 "Whale of a Time"; S5E13 "3 Babes, 100 Guns and a Fat Chick"
2006	Love Monkey	Jake Dunne	Main role; 8 episodes
2006	Community Service	Jerry	TV movie
2006	Ghost Whisperer	Matt Vonner	S2E10 "Giving Up the Ghost"
2006–2008	Jericho	Roger Hammond	7 episodes
2007	Private Practice	Jeffrey	S1E3 "In Which Addison Finds the Magic"; S1E9 "In Which Dell Finds His Fight"
2008	Without a Trace	Jay McCann	S6E15 "Deja Vu"
2008	Moonlight and Mistletoe	Peter Lowdell	TV movie
2009	Psych	Matt Tompkins	S3E13 "Any Given Friday Night at 10PM, 9PM Central"
2009	CSI: Miami	Kevin Sheridan	S7E15 "Presumed Guilty". Credited as Chris Wiehl
2009	Medium	Scott Carlow	S6E5 "Baby Fever"
2010	Farewell Mr. Kringle	Mark Stafford	TV movie
2011	Body of Proof	Bill Hemington	S2E1 "Love Thy Neighbor"
2012	Switched at Birth	Patrick	7 episodes
2012	Awkward Sunrise	Cry Guy	S1E2 "Cry Baby"
2013	The Client List	Electrician	S2E7 "I Ain't Broke But I'm Badly Bent"
2013	Killing Kennedy	Agent O'Reilly	TV movie
2015	Revenge	Kevin Hunter	S4E18 "Clarity"
2015	Masters of Sex	Al Neely	S3E6 "Two Scents"
2016	Code Black	Alex Paxton	S2E2 "Life and Limb"
2017	NCIS	Ramsay Whitman	S14E12 "Off the Grid"
2017	Chicago Justice	Defense Attorney James Olson	S1E5 "Friendly Fire"
2018	Law & Order: Special Victims Unit	Defense Attorney James Olson	S19E18 "Service"
2024	Going Home	Alec Sumner	10 episodes
