= America Olivo =

American actress, singer and model

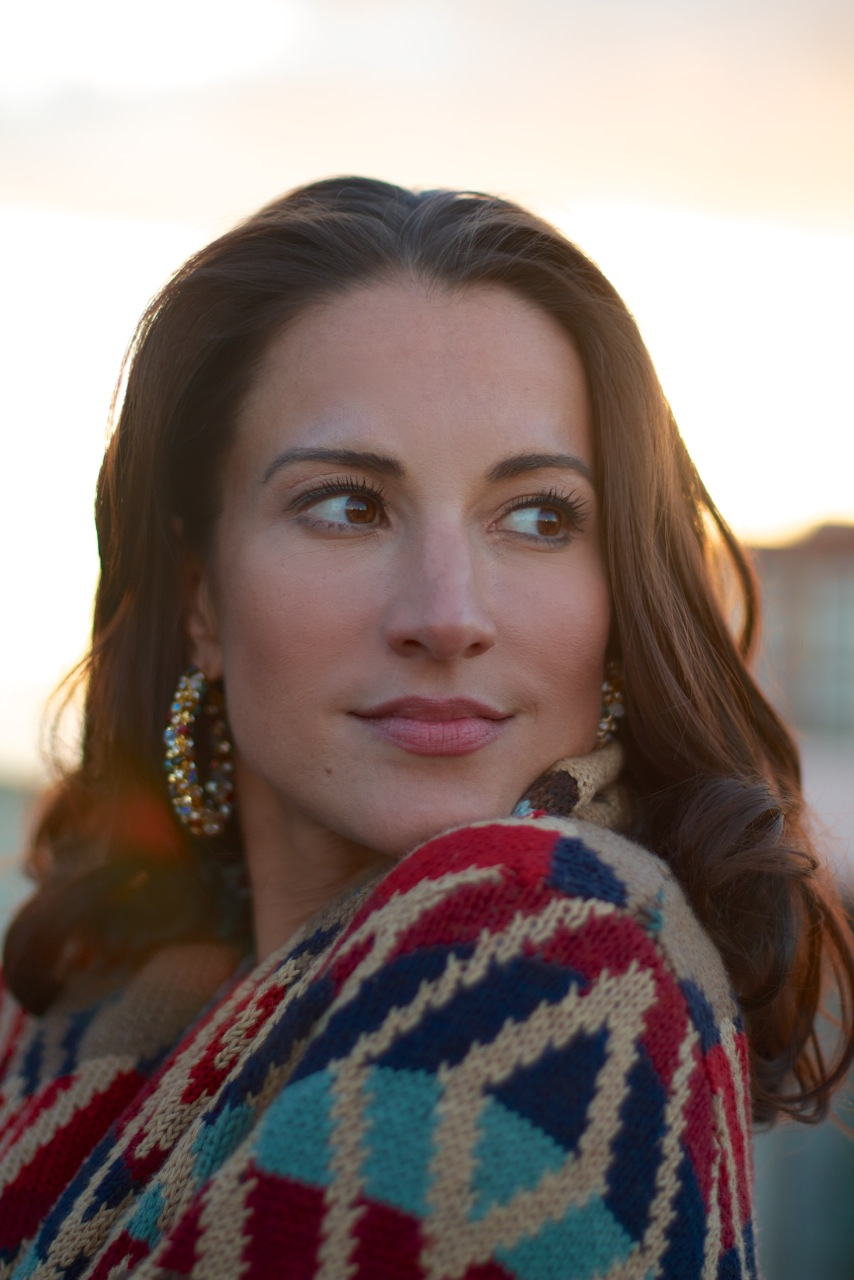
- Olivo in 2013
- Born: America Athene Olivo; January 5, 1978 (age 48); Van Nuys, California, U.S.
- Citizenship: United States; Canada
- Occupations: Actress, singer
- Years active: 2002–present
- Spouse: Christian Campbell (m. 2009)
- Children: 2 (Note: Campbell and Olivo's first child died in 2012 a few days after birth.)
- Parents: Nello Olivo (father); Danica d'Hondt (mother)
- Relatives: Neve Campbell (sister-in-law); Alex Campbell (brother-in-law); Gillian D'Hondt (cousin); Jason Brooks (brother-in-law)

America Athene Olivo (born January 5, 1978) is a Canadian-American actress and singer best known as a member of the band Soluna, for her roles in the films Bitch Slap (2009), Friday the 13th (2009) and Maniac (2012), as well as starring in the Broadway musical Spider-Man: Turn Off the Dark.

== Early and personal life ==
Born in Van Nuys, California, she also has Canadian citizenship. Olivo is the daughter of Danica d'Hondt, of Belgian and Irish descent, Miss Canada in 1959, and winemaker Nello Olivo, of Italian and Basque descent. She married actor Christian Campbell in 2009. They met on the set of the film Neighbor and married in Italy in July 2009. Their first child, a daughter, was born in 2012, but died three days later due to the genetic condition Edwards syndrome. After facing infertility issues of their own, Olivo and her husband Christian Campbell decided to become spokespeople for the BabyQuest Foundation, a 501(c)(3) charitable organization that is "dedicated to helping couples and/or individuals build families through advanced fertility treatments". The couple had a second daughter in 2019. Olivo and Campbell have also helped raise money for AIDS and HIV research through the organization The Imperial Court of New York.

== Career ==
=== Music and modeling ===
Olivo appeared on the cover of the June 2009 issue of Playboy magazine. Inside, she appears in seven fully nude photos, shot by fashion photographer Terry Richardson.

=== Stage and screen ===
The Soluna pilot opened many doors for Olivo, allowing her the opportunity to return to her roots in the theater when she performed the lead female role in a new musical Hotel C'est L'Amour, at The Blank Theatre in Los Angeles. In 2007, Olivo was nominated for an LA Weekly Theater Award for originating the role of "Marie" in this production.

Olivo starred in the Broadway musical Spider-Man: Turn Off the Dark as a swing and understudy for the lead role of "Arachne". Previews began on November 28, 2010. When Natalie Mendoza, who starred as Arachne, suffered a concussion at that first preview, Olivo played the role for several weeks in December 2010. The physically demanding role involved aerial sequences, including being spun upside-down. When Mendoza unexpectedly left the show permanently later that month, the role of Arachne went to T.V. Carpio instead of Olivo, who remained as understudy. When Carpio was injured in March 2011 and withdrew from the show for two weeks, Olivo performed the role again. Olivo left the show on April 17, 2011, when the show closed for revisions. She did not return when performances resumed May 12.

Aside from performing on stage, she quickly became busy outside of her musical career with Soluna, appearing as a guest star in numerous television series such as House, General Hospital, The Brother's Garcia, How I Met Your Mother, Jake In Progress, Cuts, Blue Bloods, Law & Order: Criminal Intent, NCIS: Los Angeles, "Warehouse 13". Currently recurring on Degrassi: The Next Generation, Olivo continues to perform as a singer, recording original music and performing covers for films.

In 2007, Olivo completed features titled The Last Resort and Love Shack. In 2008, she was featured in the DVD release The Thirst: Blood War starring opposite Tony Todd and Jason Connery and the theatrical release Circle. Olivo's 2009 theatrical releases in leading roles are action/comedy Bitch Slap and Michael Bay's 2009 version of Friday the 13th. In February 2009, she wrapped the feature film Neighbor, where she met husband Christian Campbell. More recently she filmed the remake of Maniac starring Elijah Wood, No One Lives starring Luke Evans and Conception starring David Arquette. Recently Olivo joined the cast of Chicago PD, a spin-off of Chicago Fire.

In 2013, Olivo and husband Christian Campbell began development of a script based on the life of Olivo's uncle, Olympic gold medal winner Walter D'Hondt.

She had a role in the spy action film Mission: Impossible – Rogue Nation (2015).

== Filmography ==
Film performances
Year	Title	Role	Notes
2008	The Thirst: Blood War	Amelia	
2009	Friday the 13th	Amanda	
2009	Transformers: Revenge of the Fallen	Frisbee Girl	
2009	Neighbor	The Girl	
2009	The Last Resort	Sophia	
2009	Bitch Slap	Camero	
2010	Circle	Britt	aka 6 Dead Souls
2010	Love Shack	Fifi LeBeaux	
2011	Conception	Gina	
2012	Maniac	Frank's mother	
2012	No One Lives	Tamara	
2015	Mission: Impossible – Rogue Nation	Turandot	
2016	Good Business	Lucy	Short film
2021	Making the Day	Zombie Film Star	Indie film
2024	The Father Who Stayed		
2025	Out of Order	Biianca	

Television performances
Year	Title	Role	Notes
2002	Soul Train	Herself	Musical guest
2002	The Late Late Show with Craig Kilborn	Herself	Musical guest
2002	Livin' Large	Herself	Musical guest
2003	HotPop	Herself	Musical guest
2004	The Soluna Project	Alex	TV film
2005–2006	House	Ingrid	Episodes: "Detox", "Who's Your Daddy?"
2005	Cuts	Woman	Episode: "Blinging in the New Year"
2006	Jake in Progress	Woman	Episode: "The Annie-dote"
2006	How I Met Your Mother	Beautiful Woman	Episode: "Milk"
2008	General Hospital	Marianna	4 episodes
2010	Peas in a Pod	Debra	TV film
2011	Law & Order: Criminal Intent	Nikki Vansen	Episode: "The Last Street in Manhattan"
2011	NCIS: Los Angeles	Eva Espinoza	Episode: "Sacrifice"
2013	Warehouse 13	Rebecca Carson	Episode: "The Big Snag"
2013–2014	Degrassi: The Next Generation	Consuela Rivas	Recurring role, 7 episodes
2014–2018	Chicago P.D.	Laura Dawson	6 episodes
2014	Defiance	Alethea	3 episodes
2016	Blue Bloods	Officer Jill Carpenter	Episode: "Cursed"
2016	The Strain	Captain Kate Rogers	Episodes: "Bad White", "The Battle of Central Park"
2016	Mars Project	Captain Gautier	TV film
2016–2017	Degrassi: Next Class	Consuela Rivas	4 episodes
2017	Chicago Fire	Laura Dawson	Episode: "An Agent of the Machine"
2017	Major Crimes	Liseth Ortiz	Episodes: "Shockwave, Part 1", "Shockwave, Part 2"
2018	Blindspot	Ameni	Episode: "Two Legendary Chums"
2018	Law & Order: Special Victims Unit	Claudia Bell	Episode: "Accredo"
2020	NCIS: New Orleans	Emily Landau	Episode: "Predators"
2020	For Life	Rose Davila	Episode: "Time to Move Forward"
2021	Gossip Girl	Martine	Episode: "Just Another Girl on the MTA"
2022	The Good Doctor	Mariel Torres	Episode: "Dry Spell"
2022	New Amsterdam	Inez Vea	Episode: "Rise"
2023	Magnum P.I.	Valentina	Episode: "Dark Skies"
2023	The Last Thing He Told Me	Andrea Reyes	2 episodes
2023	Special Ops: Lioness	Dr. Elsa Ramirez	Episode: "The Beating"
