= Danica d'Hondt =

English-Canadian actress, writer and businesswoman (born 1939)

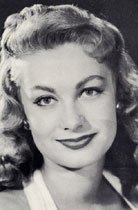
- Born: 29 May 1939 (age 86); London, England
- Spouse: Nello Olivo
- Children: 6, including America Olivo
- Relatives: Walter D'Hondt (brother); Gillian d'Hondt (niece); Christian Campbell (son-in-law); Jason Brooks (son-in-law)

Danica d'Hondt (born 29 May 1939) is an English-Canadian actress, writer, businesswoman and beauty pageant titleholder. She was a winner of the Miss Canada in 1958 and represented her country at Miss America 1959, and, later, independently of her title, Miss World 1960, where she placed Top 18. She has worked in American television and film, and theater productions in the San Francisco area.

== Biography ==
d'Hondt was born in London, England, of an Irish mother and a Belgian father. She is the sister of Canadian Olympic Gold Medalist Walter D'Hondt, the mother of actress America Olivo, the aunt of athlete Gillian d'Hondt, and mother-in-law of actors Christian Campbell and Jason Brooks.

D'Hondt began her career at the age of nine by appearing in a movie at Shepperton Studios in England. She worked in radio, TV and on stage in Canada, where her family emigrated while she was still in school. She graduated from high school in Montreal, and returned to England after attending the University of British Columbia in Vancouver. She worked as a stage actress in London, also performing in radio and TV dramas for the BBC, and then relocated to Toronto, Canada, where she became a CBC-TV game show personality and a talk show host at an early age. She also appeared on TV shows out of New York City, and in summer stock theatre in New York and Illinois. She starred with comic Harvey Korman in Living Venus (1961), a film shot in Chicago in 1960.

D'Hondt's Hollywood career spans the years from 1960 to 1990, during which time she starred in "B" movies, played supporting roles in major Hollywood movies, and performed guest-starring roles on TV shows of the time as The Man from U.N.C.L.E. (1964); The Wild Wild West (1965); Voyage to the Bottom of the Sea (1964); and Tarzan (1966). She turned down the role of "Ginger" in Gilligan's Island (1964) because production stalled, which prevented her from doing other films.

She left Hollywood from 1966 to 1971, during which time she worked as a theatre director in the San Francisco Bay Area, where she also wrote for a magazine, produced educational films and taught acting at her own school, "The Actor's Lab", on Sacramento Street.

Upon her return to Hollywood in 1971, she directed several stage productions, worked as a writer and associate producer in film and television, and did a stint as a television journalist, becoming the Consumer and Financial Reporter to a syndicated daytime magazine show called "Breakaway".

She relocated to Northern California in the 1990s, became active in real estate investing and had two non-fiction books published.

D'Hondt is married to businessman and winemaker Nello Olivo, and they have six children together. The couple lives on a vineyard in the Sierra Foothills, where she writes, teaches, and helps tend their vineyard. The couple also owns a large restaurant and banquet facility in Placerville, California, named "Sequoia".

== Filmography ==
- 1971: A Step Out of Line ... Doreen
- 1966: Unkissed Bride ... Dr. Marilyn Richards
- 1966: Tarzan ... Maggie Calloway
- 1965: Voyage to the Bottom of the Sea ... Lola Hale
- 1965: Steptoe and Son (US pilot episode) ... Interior Designer
- 1965: The Wild Wild West ... Roxanne
- 1965: A Very Special Favor ... Jacqueline
- 1965: The Man from U.N.C.L.E. ... Lucia Nazarone
- 1965: Valentine's Day ... Donna
- 1964: The Cara Williams Show ... Constance (episode "Cara, Girl Genius")
- 1964: A House Is Not a Home ... Vicki
- 1964: Bedtime Story ... Miss Knudsen
- 1964: Wild and Wonderful ... Monique
- 1964: Mr. Smith Goes to Washington ... Diana
- 1962: I'm Dickens, He's Fenster ... Dianne
- 1961: Living Venus ... Peggy Brandon
