= Cold Hearts =

1999 US horror film by Robert A. Masciantonio

- Film cover
- Directed by: Robert A. Masciantonio
- Written by: Robert A. Masciantonio
- Produced by: Josh Bender; Kevin Noland; Christopher Wiehl
- Starring: Marisa Ryan; Robert Floyd; Amy Jo Johnson; Christian Campbell; Fred Norris; Christopher Wiehl
- Cinematography: Tom Stanger
- Edited by: Kevin Krasny
- Music by: Ben Blankenship; John-Peter Hasson; Kevin Saunders Hayes; Ben Shepherd
- Distributed by: How Bad Do You Want It? Inc; Shifty'z WorldWide Entertainment Inc
- Release date: December 13, 1999
- Running time: 90 minutes
- Country: United States
- Language: English
- Budget: $900,000

Cold Hearts is a 1999 American horror-thriller film written and directed by Robert A. Masciantonio. It stars Marisa Ryan, Robert Floyd, and Amy Jo Johnson.

== Cast ==
- Marisa Ryan as Viktoria
- Robert Floyd as Seth
- Amy Jo Johnson as Alicia
- Christopher Wiehl as Charles
- Fred Norris as Uncle Joe
- Jon Huertas as Darius
- Christian Campbell as John Luke
- Dale Godboldo as Connor
- James Palmer as Duncan
- Greg Jackson as R.P.
- Robert A. Masciantonio as Kevin

== Home video ==
The film has been released on VHS and DVD format. The DVD was released in the US on October 8, 2002 by Synapse Films in a special edition version and an aspect ratio of 1.66:1, with extras including: Original Trailer, Feature Commentary by Robert A. Masciantonio, Original Audition Tapes, a short film called 'Jerks', and Photo slide show. It was released on DVD in the UK on March 6, 2000 by Bigben Interactive UK, in an aspect ratio of 1.33:1 and features no special features.
