= Marcello Thedford =

American film and television actor

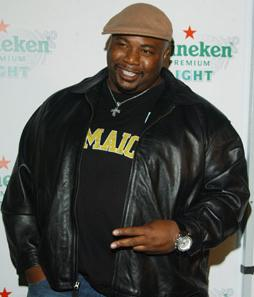
- Born: August 17, 1975 (age 51)
- Occupations: Actor, power lifter
- Years active: 1995–2021

Marcello Thedford (born August 17, 1975) is an American film actor, television actor and power lifter known for his roles as Kelvin "Buffalo" James on the ESPN dramatic series Playmakers, Semi in Employee of the Month, and in eight episodes of ER as Leon, Dr. Greg Pratt's mentally challenged brother.

== Career ==
Thedford's acting career began in improvisational theater in New York City. He studied there at the Third World Theater at Black Drama Productions. His first significant role came in the film Dangerous Minds. He also appeared in the television version of the film. He has also appeared in NYPD Blue, The District, Veronica Mars and Monk among others. He also played Peanut in the hit show Girlfriends. He starred in Why Do Fools Fall In Love.

In 2009, Thedford made a guest appearance on The CW's The Game.

== Filmography ==
=== Film ===
Year	Title	Role	Notes
1995	Crimson Tide	Lawson	
1995	Dangerous Minds	Cornelius Bates	
1996	Daylight	Kadeem	
1997	Volcano	Kevin	
1997	An Alan Smithee Film: Burn Hollywood Burn	Lee Shelton	
1998	Why Do Fools Fall in Love	Drug Dealer	
2001	Angel Eyes	Peebo	
2004	Doing Hard Time	Toure Smalls	Direct-to-video
2006	Puff, Puff, Pass	Chicken Hut Cashier	
2006	Crossover	Big Man	
2006	Employee of the Month	Semi	
2008	Keepin' the Faith: Lookin' for Mr. Right	Cedric	
2009	Da' Booty Shop	Tyrone Johnson	
2014	The Angriest Man in Brooklyn	Fred	Uncredited
2015	Solo per il weekend	Ghigno	
2016	Confessions of Isabella	Oso	Direct-to-video

=== Television ===
Year	Title	Role	Notes
1996	The Show	Chocolate Wait	4 episodes
1996	Dangerous Minds	Will	2 episodes
1996	High Incident	O.G.	Episode: "Warrant Peace"
1997	The Practice	Randy Jefferson	Episode: "Spirit of America"
1997	Grace Under Fire	Worker #1	Episode: "Grace Under Construction"
2000	Freedom Song	Tyrone Franklin	Television film
2002	The District	Donovan 'Hammi' Towne	Episode: "Shades of Gray"
2002–2003	ER	Leon	7 episodes
2003	NYPD Blue	Omar Givens	Episode: "Arrested Development"
2003	Playmakers	Kelvin 'Buffalo' James	11 episodes
2004	Method & Red	Chu Chu	Episode: "Chu Chu's Redemption"
2005, 2007	Girlfriends	Peanut Singleton	2 episodes
2006	Veronica Mars	Super Huge Deputy	2 episodes
2007	Monk	Extra Large	Episode: "Mr. Monk and the Rapper"
2008	Numbers	Reddick	Episode: "Checkmate"
2008	The Life and Times of Marcus Felony Brown	Tiny	Television film
2009	The Game	Clay	2 episodes
2009	Raising the Bar	Troy Gattis	Episode: "Making Up Is Hard to Do"
2010	Sons of Anarchy	Lander Jackson	5 episodes
2011	The Chicago Code	Big Sexy	Episode: "Wild Onions"
2013	Shameless	Julius	Episode: "Survival of the Fittest"
2013	Southland	Strokeface	2 episodes
2014	Rizzoli & Isles	Richard's Friend from the Bar	Episode: "If You Can't Stand the Heat"
2015	Criminal Minds	Eddie Parrish	Episode: "Protection"
