= Never Kill a Boy on the First Date =

- Buffy the Vampire Slayer episode
- Episode no.: Season 1 Episode 5
- Directed by: David Semel
- Written by: Rob Des Hotel; Dean Batali
- Production code: 4V05
- Original air date: March 31, 1997

Guest appearances
- *Mark Metcalf as Master; *David Boreanaz as Angel; Christopher Wiehl as Owen Thurman; Geoff Meed as Andrew Borba; Robert Mont as Van driver; Andrew J. Ferchland as Collin/Anointed One

Episode chronology
← Previous "Teacher's Pet"	Next → "The Pack"
- Buffy the Vampire Slayer season 1

"Never Kill a Boy on the First Date" is the fifth episode of the first season of the television series Buffy the Vampire Slayer. The episode aired on The WB on March 31, 1997. The episode was written by story editors Rob Des Hotel and Dean Batali, and directed by David Semel.

Buffy tries to have a normal teenage life by going on a date instead of helping Giles protect Sunnydale from a vampire prophecy. Because she is in love, she ignores the warning signs of danger. Meanwhile, while Buffy's being romanced, The Master is plotting her demise by invoking the wrath of the "Anointed One", a great warrior vampire who is The Master's most powerful weapon against the slayer.

== Plot ==
At night in a cemetery, Buffy (Sarah Michelle Gellar) stakes a vampire while Giles (Anthony Stewart Head) observes and critiques her technique. Afterward, he notices a ring on the ground, which leads him to believe that the vampire she killed was not a random encounter. Meanwhile, in his underground lair, the Master (Mark Metcalf) reads a prophecy from the Writings of Aurelius to his followers.

At school, Buffy and Giles research the engravings on the ring in the library. Owen (Christopher Wiehl), a classmate Buffy has a crush on, enters to ask about a book of Emily Dickinson's poetry. Surprised to see Buffy in the library, he assumes she isn't interested in books. After he leaves, Buffy quickly asks Giles for any books he may have by Dickinson.

At lunch, Buffy and Willow excitedly discuss her interaction with Owen. Buffy spots him sitting alone and approaches, but Cordelia (Charisma Carpenter) arrives first and invites Owen to the Bronze. Ignoring Cordelia's offer, Owen invites Buffy instead. However, Giles has deciphered more of the prophecy and becomes convinced that the Anointed One will rise that night.

Despite Buffy's protests, she and Giles spend hours staking out the cemetery. No vampires rise, and although Giles is still certain of his calculations, he finally gives up. Buffy rushes to the Bronze, only to see Owen dancing with Cordelia. Disappointed, she quietly leaves.

Meanwhile, in a bus heading to Sunnydale, a young boy speaks with a man who suddenly begins preaching about God's judgment and quoting prophecies. A vampire steps in front of the bus, causing it to crash. Other vampires appear and attack the passengers, including the preacher.

The next morning, Owen finds Buffy at school and asks her out again, giving her his pocket watch to ensure she won't be late. Buffy happily accepts, while Xander (Nicholas Brendon) watches, visibly jealous.

That night, Buffy gets ready for her date with help from Willow (Alyson Hannigan) and Xander. Giles arrives unexpectedly with a newspaper reporting that five people died in the bus crash, including a suspected murderer named Andrew Borba — the man who had been quoting prophecies. Convinced Borba may be the Anointed One, Giles warns Buffy, but she insists she can manage both slaying and a social life. Giles reluctantly decides to investigate the funeral home on his own.

At the Bronze, Buffy and Owen enjoy their date until Cordelia tries to interrupt them on the dance floor. Meanwhile, Giles is ambushed by vampires at the funeral home and locks himself in a room. Xander and Willow witness this through a window and rush to the Bronze to alert Buffy. Angel (David Boreanaz) arrives at the Bronze and cryptically warns Buffy that something dangerous is coming. Eventually, Xander and Willow convince her to leave by pretending they want to do something daring as a couple on a double date. Buffy tries to leave Owen behind, kissing him goodbye, but he follows them to the funeral home.

While Giles and Buffy search the morgue, Borba rises as a vampire and attacks, knocking Owen unconscious. Enraged, Buffy fights Borba and kills him by shoving him into a burning furnace.

The next day at school, Owen is exhilarated by the previous night's events, saying that almost being killed made him feel alive. Realizing her world is too dangerous for him, Buffy reluctantly ends their relationship.

Giles tries to comfort her, explaining that he once had dreams of a different life before learning at the age of ten that he was destined to be a Watcher. Buffy finds comfort in the thought that at least the Master's plan has failed.

Underground, the Master welcomes the real Anointed One — the young boy from the bus.

== Cultural references ==
Owen calls the school's lunch "Soylent Green," the food from the 1973 dystopian film of the same name.

Buffy compares her life as a Slayer with Clark Kent, the secret identity of the Superman.

Borba sings the hymn "Shall We Gather at the River?".

Owen intended to go with Buffy to a Ben & Jerry's ice cream shop.

== Reception ==
"Never Kill a Boy on the First Date" first aired on The WB on March 31, 1997. It earned a Nielsen rating of 2.8 on its original airing. It was the 104th most watched show out of all 115 primetime shows of its time; fifth out of the eleven shows from The WB.

Vox ranked it at No. 115 on their "Every Episode Ranked From Worst to Best" list of all 144 episodes (to mark the 20th anniversary of the show), calling it "the kind of sweet, wistful little story that Buffy first cut its teeth on while it was still figuring out how to go mythic and grand."

Noel Murray of The A.V. Club liked that the episode explored a new side of Buffy, but felt that the four previous episodes had not set up Buffy as a "person with normal teenage tastes and desires". He still found "a lot to like" in the episode. A BBC review stated that some "very amusing scenes compensate for the absence of an involving plot". The review noted that the plot took a while to get started and the direction of the funeral home sequences made it fall short of its potential. DVD Talk's Philip Duncan identified "Never Kill a Boy on the First Date" the "weakest" episode of those relating to the Master plotline in the season.

Rolling Stone ranked "Never Kill a Boy on the First Date" at No. 132 on their "Every Episode Ranked From Worst to Best" list, noting the "challenge of Buffy balancing her life as a Slayer and her life as a teenage girl who wants to date will continue to play a greater role in the show, but its first exploration begins here", adding that "the chemistry between Sarah Michelle Gellar and Anthony Stewart Head absolutely shines."

"Never Kill a Boy on the First Date" was ranked at No. 124 on Paste Magazine's "Every Episode Ranked" list and #131 on BuzzFeed's "Ranking Every Episode" list.
