= Marisa Ryan =

American actress

- Occupation: Actress
- Years active: 1983–present
- Spouse: Jeremy Sisto (m. 1993; div. 2002)

Marisa Ryan is an American actress, best known for her role as Nina Grabowski in the HBO series Sex and the City, as Elizabeth Cooper-MacGillis in the CBS sitcom Major Dad (1989–1993), and as Abby Bernstein in the 2001 comedy film Wet Hot American Summer, its Netflix prequel series, Wet Hot American Summer: First Day of Camp (2015) and its Netflix sequel series Wet Hot American Summer: Ten Years Later (2017).

== Career ==
Ryan made her screen debut in a small role in the 1983 film Without a Trace. From 1989 to 1993, she starred as Elizabeth Cooper-MacGillis in the CBS sitcom Major Dad opposite Gerald McRaney. She later went to star in the Independent films Love Always (1996), Slaves to the Underground (1997), Taylor's Return (1997), and With or Without You (1998). In 1998, Ryan joined the cast of Fox police drama series New York Undercover as Det. Nell Delaney, during the show's fourth and final season. She later guest-starred on The Practice, Sex and the City, Law & Order: Special Victims Unit, and Law & Order.

In 2001, Ryan co-starred as Abby Bernstein in the ensemble cast satirical comedy film Wet Hot American Summer. She reprised her role in the Netflix prequel series, Wet Hot American Summer: First Day of Camp in 2015. She also appeared in films Don's Plum (2001), Riding in Cars with Boys (2001), and Brooklyn Lobster (2005). In 1997, she made her directorial debut with the independent short film Three Women of Pain which she also co-wrote.

== Personal life ==
Jeremy Sisto and Ryan were married in 1993. They separated but remained legally married until June 21, 2002.

== Filmography ==
=== Film ===
Year	Title	Role	Notes
1983	Without a Trace	Justine Norris	
1996	Love Always	Julia Bradshaw	
1997	Slaves to the Underground	Suzy	
1997	Taylor's Return	Liz	
1998	With or Without You	Zoe	
1999	Man of the Century	Gertrude	
1999	Trash	Alex Staley	
1999	Cold Hearts	Viktoria	
2001	Wet Hot American Summer	Abby	
2001	Don's Plum	Anna	
2001	The Cure for Boredom	Danya	
2001	Riding in Cars with Boys	Janet Donofrio - Age 19	
2002	Stella shorts	College Buddy	Direct-to-video
2003	Justice	Julia	
2004	Confessions of a Dangerous Mime	Susan Stapleton	Short
2005	Alchemy	Bridesmaid	
2005	Brooklyn Lobster	Lauren Wallace	
2007	Puberty: The Movie	Lashonda	
2010	The Extra Man	Tanya	
2017	Middleground	Marcus' Wife	
2019	Human Capital	Ella	

=== Television ===
Year	Title	Role	Notes
1989–1993	Major Dad	Elizabeth Cooper McGillis	96 episodes
1996	Boy Meets World	Irene	Episode: "You Can Go Home Again"
1997	Promised Land	Samantha Markovich	Episode: "The Collapse"
1997	The Pretender	Helen Diggs	Episode: "Unhappy Landings"
1998–1999	New York Undercover	Det. Nell Delaney	13 episodes
1999	The Practice	Cynthia Simonson	Episode: "Closet Justice"
1999	Sex and the City	Nina G.	Episode: "Twenty-Something Girls vs. Thirty-Something Women"
2000	Mary and Rhoda	Meredith Rousseau	Television film
2000	Deadline	Stokes	Episode: "Pilot"
2002	The Pennsylvania Miners' Story	Leslie Mayhugh	Television film
2002	Hack	Melissa	Episode: "All Night Long"
2003	Law & Order: Special Victims Unit	Laura Bergeron	Episode: "Tragedy"
2005, 2008	Law & Order	Woman with Drink/Stacey Ranson	2 episodes
2008	1%	Montana	Television film
2014	The Leftovers	Imposter	Episode: "Guest"
2015	Odd Mom Out	Krista	Episode: "Brooklandia"
2015	Wet Hot American Summer: First Day of Camp	Abby	3 episodes
2015	The Mysteries of Laura	Susan	Episode: "The Mystery of the Maternal Instinct"
2017	Wet Hot American Summer: Ten Years Later	Abby	7 episodes
2019	Divorce	Ursula	Episode: "Miami"
