= Jason Brooks (actor) =

American actor (born 1966)

- Born: Jason Maxwell Brooks; May 10, 1966 (age 60); Colorado Springs, Colorado, U.S.
- Occupation: Actor
- Years active: 1990–present
- Spouse: Corinne Olivo (m. 1994)
- Children: 2
- Relatives: Nello Olivo (father-in-law); Danica d'Hondt (mother-in-law); America Olivo (sister-in-law)

Jason Maxwell Brooks (born May 10, 1966) is an American actor. He is best known for playing Peter Blake on the soap opera Days of Our Lives and Sean Monroe on Baywatch Hawaii.

== Career ==
Brooks started his career as an actor in 1990 when he was 24 years old. He had recurring appearances on the television shows The Pretender and The Suite Life of Zack & Cody. He played Bacarra, a warlock. in an episode of Charmed. He also appeared in an episode of the NBC sitcom Friends as Rick in "The One with the Ballroom Dancing" in season four.

Brooks voiced the protagonist, Ronan O'Connor, of the 2014 action-adventure video game, Murdered: Soul Suspect.

== Personal life ==
He married Corinne Olivo on February 20, 1994. They have two sons. He is the son-in-law of actress Danica d'Hondt and brother-in-law of America Olivo, Christian Campbell.

== Filmography ==
=== Film ===
Year	Title	Role	Notes
1990	I'm Dangerous Tonight	Mason	TV movie
1990	Captain America	Spa Man #1	
1991	Bloodmatch	Steve Buscomo	
1994	Winter Heat	Peter Blake	TV movie
1997	Alibi	Connor Hill	TV movie
1998	Making It Home	Carl	
1999	The Darwin Conspiracy	Dr. Jack Ward	TV movie
1999	Three Secrets	Garrett	TV movie
2001	Flying Virus	Scotty	
2002	The Rose Technique	Eddie	
2003	War Stories	Mike Skrumbis	TV movie
2003	Purgatory Flats	Martin Reed	
2003	A Carol Christmas	John Joyce	TV movie
2006	Submission	Buddy Blankenship	Video
2006	Lime Salted Love	Justin the Bartender	
2007	You've Got a Friend	Jeff Graham	TV movie
2009	Star Trek	Romulan Helmsman	
2009	Accused at 17	Trevor Lautten	
2010	Burning Palms	Steve	
2010	Day One	Highway Patrolman	TV movie
2011	Super 8	Air Force Security	
2011	Keeping Up with the Randalls	Uncle Tim	TV movie
2011	Christmas Spirit	Tom	TV movie
2012	Home Invasion	Eric Wallace	TV movie
2012	Beverly Hills Chihuahua 3: Viva la Fiesta!	Mr. Montague	Video
2012	Golden Winter	Jeff Richmond	
2013	The Good Mother	Officer Daniels	TV movie
2013	The Perfect Boyfriend	Chuck Gridge	TV movie
2014	Asteroid vs Earth	Lt. Commander Chase Seward	TV movie
2014	Blood Lake: Attack of the Killer Lampreys	Michael	TV movie
2015	Guilt by Association	J. D. Miller	TV movie
2017	Intrepid	-	Short
2017	The Stalker Club	Trevor	TV movie
2017	The Saint	Captain Miller	TV movie
2017	A Lover Betrayed	Roger Nolans	TV movie
2017	Limelight	James Chance	
2017	Gangster Land	Agent Wilson	
2019	Adopted in Danger	Tom Mason	
2019	Devil's Revenge	Sergio	
2023	Murder at the Murder Mystery Party	Davis Fordham	

=== Television ===
Year	Title	Role	Notes
1990	Doogie Howser, M.D.	Greg	Episode: "Nautilus for Naught"
1992	Baywatch	Brown Goodman	Episode: "Game of Chance"
1993–98	Days of Our Lives	Peter Blake	Regular Cast
1997	Friends	Rick	Episode: "The One with the Ballroom Dancing"
1998	Love Boat: The Next Wave	Luke Staley	Episode: "Smooth Sailing"
1998	Early Edition	Nick Sterling	Episode: "Saint Nick"
1999–00	The Pretender	Thomas Gates	Recurring Cast: Season 3, Guest: Season 4
1999–01	Baywatch	Sean Monroe	Main Cast: Season 10-11
2002	Charmed	Bacarra	Episode: "A Witch in Time"
2003	Dragnet	Gerald Canin	Episode: "For Whom the Whistle Blows"
2003	The Practice	A.D.A. Adam Morris	Episode: "Blessed Are They"
2003	CSI: Miami	Carl Purdue	Episode: "Bait"
2003	NCIS	Major Danny O'Donnell	Episode: "Marine Down"
2004	JAG	First Lieutenant John Ditullio	Episode: "Corporate Raiders"
2005	Boston Legal	Justin Murray	Recurring Cast: Season 2
2006	Mystery Woman	Jeb Fletcher	Episode: "Wild West Mystery"
2006	Pepper Dennis	Bryce	Recurring Cast
2006	CSI: NY	Paul White	Episode: "Stealing Home"
2007	The Suite Life of Zack & Cody	Dakota Smith	Episode: "I Want My Mummy"
2007	The Closer	Scott Mason	Episode: "Manhunt"
2008	Las Vegas	Barry Limnick	Episode: "Three Weddings and a Funeral: Part 1"
2008	Without a Trace	Connor Banes	Episode: "Driven"
2009	Castle	Ian Harris	Episode: "Nanny McDead"
2009	Ghost Whisperer	Jeremy Bishop	Episode: "The Book of Changes"
2010	Big Love	Attorney	Episode: "Next Ticket Out"
2010	CSI: Crime Scene Investigation	Simon Rose	Episode: "Neverland"
2010	Criminal Minds	John Vincent Bell	Episode: "The Fight"
2011	No Ordinary Family	Kyle Rainey	Episode: "No Ordinary Powell"
2011	Switched at Birth	Bruce	Recurring Cast: Season 1
2011	Torchwood	Press Secretary	Episode: "Miracle Day: The Middle Men"
2011	Body of Proof	Ben Allen	Episode: "Love Bites"
2013	Revolution	Captain Richard Lewis	Episode: "The Love Boat"
2014	The Mentalist	Ted Randolph	Episode: "Blue Bird"
2016	NCIS: Los Angeles	Sy Riggs	Episode: "Come Back"
2016	How to Get Away with Murder	Nelson Duvall	Episode: "Call It Mother's Intuition"
2019	Hawaii Five-0	Owen Pearsen	Episode: "Ke ala o ka pu"
