= Nello Olivo =

American winemaker

Nello Olivo is an estate California vineyard operator whose award-winning wines brought global recognition for the wines of the El Dorado in California.

== Biography ==
Nello Olivo was born in Santa Clara County, California to a family of 16 children. His grandfather Enrico was born in Todi, Umbria, Italy in 1879, with all his other grandparents being from Spain Olivo has brought unique Italian grape varieties to the California wine region and has worked with the University of California, Davis on bringing the rare Sagrantino to the United States. His Sangiovese was the winner of the 2010 California State Fair and his Petite Sirah was award the prestigious Best In Class at the 2011 California State Fair.

== Family ==
Nello Olivo is the husband of actress Danica d'Hondt, father of actress America Olivo, and father-in-law to actors Christian Campbell and Jason Brooks.

== See also ==
- List of wine personalities
