= Slaves to the Underground =

- Directed by: Kristine Peterson
- Written by: Bill Cody
- Starring: Molly Gross; Jason Bortz; Marisa Ryan
- Edited by: Eric Vizents
- Music by: Mike Martt
- Production company: Neo Motion Pictures
- Distributed by: First Look Pictures
- Release date: November 14, 1997 (U.S.)
- Running time: 93 minutes
- Country: United States

Slaves to the Underground is a 1997 drama film directed by Kristine Peterson and starring Molly Gross, Jason Bortz, and Marisa Ryan.

== Premise ==
In Seattle's mid-1990s grunge scene, a female rock group named No Exits is struggling to gain attention. Guitarist Shelly (Molly Gross) threatens the band's future by jumping back and forth between a lesbian relationship with the band's singer Suzy (Marisa Ryan) and a heterosexual relationship with her ex-boyfriend Jimmy (Jason Bortz).

== Production ==
Shooting occurred on location in Seattle, Washington. It is to date the last film directed by Kristine Peterson, who had previously directed six films, beginning with 1988's Deadly Dreams. Slaves to the Underground featured the film debut of actress Molly Gross, whose only other roles came that same year with Scream 2 and the made-for-television film Deep Family Secrets.

== Release ==
Slaves to the Underground premiered at the 1997 edition of the Sundance Film Festival, where it competed in the "Dramatic Competition" category. First Look Pictures/Neo Motion Pictures would later give it an American theatrical release in November 1997. Details regarding the film's box office revenue are not publicly available.

== Reception ==
It received a generally mixed response from critics. A positive review at the time came from Stephen Holden of The New York Times, who praised the film's spontaneous performances in November 1997. LGBT publication The Advocate gave it a negative review in December 1997. The review states, "despite its setting in the Seattle music scene and its righteous send-ups of riot grrrl civil disobedience, Slaves feels forced and contrived from start to finish [...] the main problem is a rather large one — the insincere-seeming heroine of the film, Shelly, whose self-proclaimed 'confusion' regarding both her girlfriend, Suzy, and her boyfriend, Jimmy, reinforces every negative bisexual stereotype in the book". The review added that "even a kick-ass sound track — including cuts by Ani DiFranco and Joan Jett — cannot rescue a film that, A la Chasing Amy, seeks to portray a generation whose love lives have been complicated by rampant lesbianism (if only it were true). This ground was covered far more powerfully this year in Alex Sichel's All Over Me".

Reviewing from Sundance, Godfrey Cheshire of Variety said "its view of the alternative scene is cliched and exploitative enough to embarrass actual scenesters, auds of all sorts stand to be put off by its whiny, immature characters". Cheshire also said that the film's fortunes "appear bleak beyond venues looking for examples of how political correctness is deforming indie moviemaking." Another mixed review came from Russell Smith of The Austin Chronicle, who gave it two and a half out of five stars. He wrote, "respect is due to Peterson for permitting this level of frankness in a movie with such a clear political agenda. But Slaves to the Underground is so lackluster in such basic areas as editing, shot composition, acting and dialogue that the potential impact is diluted by half". Smith added, "finally, if a film is going to criticize Cindy Crawford for representing a false ideal of beauty, wouldn't those words ring truer if so many of its female characters didn't look like artfully disheveled beer commercial babes?".

On December 30, 1997, Ink 19 magazine described the film as being "better than the critics gave it credit for" and "relevant to the times". It claimed that the film "[doesn't try] to be more than it is, allowing the viewer to more easily accept it at face value". Slaves to the Underground was included in Magill's Cinema Annual 1998: A Survey of the Films of 1997, with the book stating that, "the Seattle scene, with its coffee houses and Generation-X angst, was captured much more effectively in Cameron Crowe's Singles (1992), while the lesbian sexually ambivalent-Nineties-riot-grrrl-tale was handled with more warm sensitivity in Alex Sichel's overlooked All Over Me (1997)".
