= Jason Matthew Smith =

American film and television actor (born 1972)

- Born: November 8, 1972 (age 53); Indianapolis, Indiana, U.S.
- Education: University of Cincinnati (BFA); Northern Illinois University (MFA)
- Occupation: Actor
- Years active: 1993–present

Jason Matthew Smith (born November 8, 1972) is an American film and television actor. He is best known for playing Hendorff aka Cupcake, USS Enterprise crew member, in Star Trek film franchise.

== Background ==
Born in Indianapolis, Indiana, he was raised in the mid-west with his three siblings and parents, and a pig farm. He lived in Cincinnati through high school and while earning his Bachelor of Fine Art in acting from the University of Cincinnati. He then earned a Master of Fine Arts in acting from the Northern Illinois University.

His acting career began when he moved to Los Angeles in 2000.

== Filmography ==
=== Film ===
Year	Title	Role	Notes
1993	Airborne	Rosenblat	
2002	13 Moons	Bar cop	
2003	Hollywood Homicide	Repo Guy	
2005	Rebound	Referee Mike	
2009	Star Trek	Hendorff/Cupcake	
2013	Star Trek Into Darkness	Hendorff/Cupcake	
2016	Star Trek Beyond	Hendorff/Cupcake	
2016	Six Gun Savior	Burt Beck	
2022	Bullet Train	Curious Merc	

=== Television ===
Year	Title	Role	Notes
2001	JAG	Sandusky	Episode: "The Iron Coffin"
2001	Six Feet Under	Basher #1	Episode: "A Private Life"
2001	ER	Ralph Banks	Episode: "Never Say Never"
2001	Off Centre	Boyfriend	Episode: "Trust Me or Don't Trust Me"
2002	Charmed	Demon #1	Episode: "The Three Faces of Phoebe"
2002	The Bernie Mac Show	Cop	Episode: "Lock Down"
2002	24	Chris	Episode: "6:00 p.m.-7:00 p.m."
2002	Robbery Homicide Division	CHP #1	Episode: "Mini-Mall"
2002	Without a Trace	Colin Foley	Episode: "Snatch Back"
2003	Playmakers	Eric Olczyk	11 episodes
2005	Cold Case	Bill Crawford (1978)	Episode: "Blank Generation"
2005	CSI: Crime Scene Investigation	Jake Wernerer	Episode: "Committed"
2006	CSI: Miami	Greg Everest	Episode: "Driven"
2006	Bones	Dave Swanson	Episode: "The Girl with the Curl"
2007	Drive	Rent-a-Cop	Episode: "No Turning Back"
2007	Big Love	Officer Lyle	2 episodes
2008	1%	L.H. Mantooth	Television film
2009	The League	Angry Boyfriend	Episode: "The Bounce Test"
2009	Sons of Anarchy	Ule	4 episodes
2011	NCIS: Los Angeles	David Jacobs	Episode: "Lockup"
2012	Suburgatory	Scotty	Episode: "The Body"
2012	Longmire	Jeremy Thompson	Episode: "Dog Soldier"
2012	Common Law	Gay Shooting Club Member	Episode: "Joint Custody"
2015	Star Trek: Renegades	Malbon	Episode: "Pilot"
