= The Pennsylvania Miners' Story =

2002 American television film

- DVD cover
- Written by: Elwood Reid
- Directed by: David Frankel
- Starring: Graham Beckel; Dylan Bruno; Marisa Ryan; JD Souther; Michael Bowen
- Music by: Mason Daring
- Country of origin: United States
- Original language: English

Production
- Producer: Jack Clements
- Cinematography: Tony Cutrono; Igor Meglic; John Thomas
- Editors: William Marrinson; Christopher Rouse
- Running time: 100 minutes
- Production companies: Sanitsky Company; Touchstone Television
- Budget: $8,500,000 (Estimated)

Original release
- Network: ABC
- Release: November 24, 2002

The Pennsylvania Miners' Story is a 2002 television film. It was written by Elwood Reid and directed by David Frankel. The film is based on the real events occurred at the Quecreek Mine. It was mostly filmed on location at Somerset County, Pennsylvania and some scenes were shot on the actual Quecreek Mine. "The Pennsylvania Miners' Story" was first aired at ABC on November 24, 2002.

== Plot ==
The film tells the real story of nine miners trapped underground and the attempts to rescue them. Based on the events occurred on the Quecreek Mine between July 24 to 28, 2002.

== Production ==
Disney reportedly paid "$1.35 million ($150,000 to each miner) for the television and book rights."

== Cast ==
- Graham Beckel as Randy Fogle
- Dylan Bruno as Blaine Mayhugh
- Marisa Ryan as Leslie Mayhugh
- JD Souther as Dennis 'Harpo' Hall
- Michael Bowen as Robert 'Boogie' Pugh

== Reception ==
"The Pennsylvania Miners' Story" was nominated for two Golden Reel Awards, in the categories of "Best Sound Editing in Television Long Form - Sound Effects & Foley" and "Best Sound Editing in Television Long Form - Dialogue & ADR".

Anita Gates from The New York Times wrote: "The film captures the elation of the rescue and of renewed hope along the way but doesn't begin to convey the drama of the actual events in Quecreek, Pa. And this was a story in which the news coverage could make a person cry."

Walter Chaw of Film Freak Central wrote: "Tweaking emotions is a fragile pastime, and there's a thin line between "tribute" and "mawkish.""
