= Playmakers =

2003 American sports drama TV series

- DVD cover
- Genre: Drama
- Created by: John Eisendrath
- Starring: Tony Denison; Omar Gooding; Russell Hornsby; Jason Matthew Smith; Marcello Thedford; Christopher Wiehl
- Music by: Lou Natale
- Country of origin: United States
- Original language: English
- No. of seasons: 1
- No. of episodes: 11

Production
- Executive producers: John Eisendrath; Orly Adelson
- Producer: Jamie Paul Rock
- Production location: Toronto
- Cinematography: John Berrie
- Running time: 43–47 minutes
- Production companies: Thanksgiving Day; Imagine Television; Orly Adelson Productions; Touchstone Television

Original release
- Network: ESPN
- Release: August 26 – November 11, 2003

Playmakers is an American drama television series created by John Eisendrath that aired on ESPN from August 26 to November 11, 2003. It depicts the lives of the Cougars, a fictional professional football team playing in an unidentified city. The show stars Tony Denison, Omar Gooding, Russell Hornsby, Jason Matthew Smith, Marcello Thedford, and Christopher Wiehl. The show, which ran eleven episodes, was the first original drama series created by ESPN. Although the ratings were very high for ESPN—Playmakers was the highest-rated show on the network other than its Sunday night NFL and Saturday college football games—ESPN eventually canceled the series under pressure from the National Football League, who disliked the portrayal of the negative aspects of its players' lives off the field.

== Style ==
The show follows the lives of various members of an ensemble cast who portray the players and personnel on a fictional American football team, the Cougars, in a fictional league (referred to in the series as "The League") during the regular season.

Many of these segments are prefaced by an internal monologue in the format of a character narrating in his head.

== Cast and characters ==
=== Main ===
- Tony Denison as Coach Mike George - The head coach in his ninth season with the team.
- Omar Gooding as Demetrius Harris, #39 - A rookie running back from Colorado.
- Russell Hornsby as Leon Taylor, #33 - A ninth year running back from USC.
- Jason Matthew Smith as Eric Olczyk, #54 - A fifth year middle linebacker from Penn State.
- Marcello Thedford as Kelvin "The Buffalo" James, #60 - A fourth year offensive tackle from Oklahoma State.
- Christopher Wiehl as Derek McConnell, #11 - A fourth year quarterback from Louisville.

=== Recurring ===
- Stephen Bogaert as Phil Chambers, Team Equipment Manager
- Bruce Gray as Gene Wilbanks, the team's owner
- Phillip Jarrett as Coach Rudman, Defensive Coordinator and close friend of Coach George
- Karen LeBlanc as Robin Taylor, Leon's wife
- Thea Andrews as Samantha Lovett, reporter who presumably shows a love interest for Leon Taylor.
- Dan Petronijevic as Thad Guerwicz, a wide receiver who is a closeted gay man
- Kevin Jubinville as Dr. Gatewood, The team Physician
- Sasha Roiz as Stephen Lyles, Assistant Head Coach and Offensive Coordinator
- Gabriel Hogan as "Guard Dog" Fredericks
- Tacquira LaTouche as Herself
- Frank Chiesurin as David, Guerwictz's boyfriend
- Laura Jordan as August, Guerwictz's girlfriend and later fiancé to publicly cover up his homosexuality
- K. C. Collins as Ron Martin, a rookie Wide Receiver for the Cougars.

=== Roster ===
Cougars
Quarterbacks: -- Madziak; 11 Derek McConnell; 6 Phillips; Running backs: -- Bradford FB; 39 Demetrius Harris; 29 Beiderman FB; 33 Leon Taylor; -- Thaysen FB; Wide receivers: -- Connon; 86 Davies; 83 Thad Guerwitcz; 87 Lawrence; 82 Martin; -- Pearson; Tight ends: 89 Belling; -- Ireson; 85 Valentine	Offensive linemen: -- Curtis RG; -- Earle LT; -- Federov RT; 65 "Guard Dog" Fredericks RG; 80 Harvey LG; -- Henton RG; 79 Inglis C; 60 Kelvin "The Buffalo" James LT; -- Katz C; -- Moore C; -- Katz C; 68 Sands RT; -- Wallace LG; -- Wilson LT; 70 Wright RT; Defensive linemen: 73 Brophy RE; -- Carter DT; 75 Downey DT; -- Flynn LE; -- Gerstein DT; -- Green DT; 78 Hart DT; -- Hupponen RE; -- Krauskopf LE; -- Maltais RE; 66 Rock LE; -- Simons DT	Linebackers: -- Edwards OLB; -- Egan MLB; -- Ferguson OLB; -- Hootstein OLB; 51 Trent King OLB; -- Knight OLB; 59 Mooney MLB; 30 Nelson OLB; 54 Eric Olczyk MLB; Defensive backs: 27 Adams SS; -- Angeli FS; 43 Ray Barnes CB; 22 Carter SS; -- Clarke CB; 9 Gibson FS; -- Grazian CB; -- Holland SS; -- Oliver CB; -- Peters CB; 38 Rodriguez FS; Special teams: 10 Mendes K; 15 O’Shae P	Unknown Positions: 67 Harvey; 57 Johnson; 26 Rodgers; 31 Stark; 71 Williams

== Episodes ==
No.	Title	Directed by	Written by	Original release date
1	"Game Day"	Scott Brazil	John Eisendrath	August 26, 2003
The Cougars are 2–3 and it's six hours to kickoff. Veteran running back Leon Taylor, back from injured reserve, plans to retake the starting role from Demetrius Harris. "D.H." will not slow down for anyone. Linebacker Eric Olczyk can't get over his hit that paralyzed a player and Coach George is depending on a psychiatrist to get Olczyk's head back in the game. Fresh from a night of partying, DH and offensive lineman Kelvin "Buffalo" James are late heading to the stadium. At game time, it's unclear who will take the field.
2	"The Piss Man"	T. J. Scott	John Eisendrath	September 2, 2003
The league drug-testing official visits the Cougars in the second episode of Playmakers, and DH finds out that he's on the list. Offensive lineman "Guard Dog" Fredericks tempts Leon with a way to get his mojo back. Olczyk continues to struggle with the ramifications of the devastating hit he made. Speaking of pain, quarterback Derek McConnell sucks down anti-inflammatories like candy. The team doctor is concerned about McConnell's health. It's all part of the effort to keep personal problems from interfering with the game. Guard Dog gets caught and DH goes through a terrible procedure, involving injecting clean urine into his own bladder, to not get caught.
3	"The Choice"	Brad Turner	Stephen Hootstein	September 9, 2003
Two of the Cougars are tackling some big decisions. A man is shot outside a nightclub by DH's friend Cal and he is forced to decide where his loyalties lie — with the team or with his posse. Meanwhile, Leon gets a chance to be traded to another team, but his wife, Robin, isn't sold on the idea of uprooting their lives. Their marriage begins to suffer.
4	"The Choice Part II"	Bruce McDonald	Peter Egan	September 16, 2003
The Cougars' team owner, Gene Wilbanks, pressures DH to change his statement about the shooting at the nightclub after new evidence surfaces. Meanwhile, Olczyk meets and pursues a romantic relationship with Beth, who has surprise news about his father. The rift grows between Leon and Robin, after he refuses to get counseling.
5	"Halftime"	John Fawcett	Edwin Eisendrath	September 23, 2003
The Cougars have been ravaged in the first half. They are plagued with injuries. Coach George and the medical staff must patch up the pieces for the second half. Leon faces a potentially career-ending knee injury in which a player missed a block, resulting in Leon's injury. As Leon is awaiting the results from the X-ray on his knee, he realizes that Robin spent the night at Eric's place. The argument escalates into Leon punching Olczyk in the face several times. They make amends after clarifying their earlier discussion. Wide receiver Thad Guerwitcz (Dan Petronijevic) gives DH his Saint Christopher medal in an attempt to help him begin leaving his habit behind, and recites the Lord's Prayer before the team returns to the field.
6	"Man in Motion"	Terry Ingram	Michael Angeli	September 30, 2003
Coach George lectures the team about selling "the fake"; football is all about deception. Speaking of deception, DH's drug abuse comes to a head when Wilbanks sends him to detox. Viewers learn Guerwitcz's closely guarded secret. Television reporter Samantha Lovett begins to dig up dirt about a domestic abuse rumor involving Leon. McConnell arranges a night out for the boys. Olczyk's romantic interest in Beth resurfaces.
7	"Talk Radio"	Ken Girotti	Charles D. Holland	October 7, 2003
Leon and Robin's decision to go public with their domestic abuse incident leads to legal problems for Leon and a possible suspension. Guerwitcz struggles to maintain a double life. DH must make a charity appearance to cheer up a terminally ill young boy. Coach George finally sees a doctor. McConnell treads on dangerous ground with Wilbanks' daughter.
8	"Down and Distance"	John Bell	Craig Sweeny	October 14, 2003
Olczyk prepares to face his nemesis, Luther Hawkins, the league's star quarterback who routinely scrambles his way past linebackers to rushing touchdowns. Leon tries to resolve his legal issues to continue playing on the team. Coach George gets his test results while one of McConnell's romantic interludes comes back to haunt him. Guerwitcz struggles with whether to tell his teammates he is gay.
9	"The Outing"	Chris Grismer	Story by : Peter Egan & Stephen Hootstein; Teleplay by : Craig Sweeny	October 28, 2003
Guerwitcz makes an attempt to dodge a rumor that one of the players is gay by asking August to marry him. But his partner David (Frank Chiesurin) has had enough and outs him to the team, putting Guerwitcz's future with the Cougars in question. Meanwhile, tensions build between Olczyk and Leon over Olczyk's in-season contract negotiations.
10	"Tenth of a Second"	Stephen Williams	Michael Angeli	November 4, 2003
Leon learns that Wilbanks is not renewing his contract, so he puts himself through a combination of athletic drills to prove to Coach George that he's still got it. DH's reunion with his older brother, Big E (rapper Snoop Dogg), leads to trouble when Big E learns the truth about Cal's crime.
11	"Week 17"	T. J. Scott	John Eisendrath	November 11, 2003
Leon plans for retirement by auditioning for a sportscaster job. Buffalo's weight issues affect his chances of playing. Now that DH is back on top, how far can he flaunt his playmaker ways? After Olczyk invites Beth to move in, he must decide how to handle the surprise of Jenna's pregnancy.

== Production ==
Filming took place in Toronto from May to October 2003. Game scenes were filmed at the SkyDome, with Canadian Football League players serving as background actors or stunt doubles.

== DVD ==
The only season of Playmakers was released on DVD by ESPN Home Video in 2004.

== Awards ==
- Won AFI TV Award, Top TV Series (2003)
- Won GLAAD Media Award, Outstanding Drama Series (2004)
- Nominated CSC Award, Best Cinematography in TV Series (2004)
- Nominated DGC Craft Award, Outstanding Achievement in Sound Editing - Television Series (2004)

== See also ==
- List of American football films
