= New York Undercover =

American police drama TV series

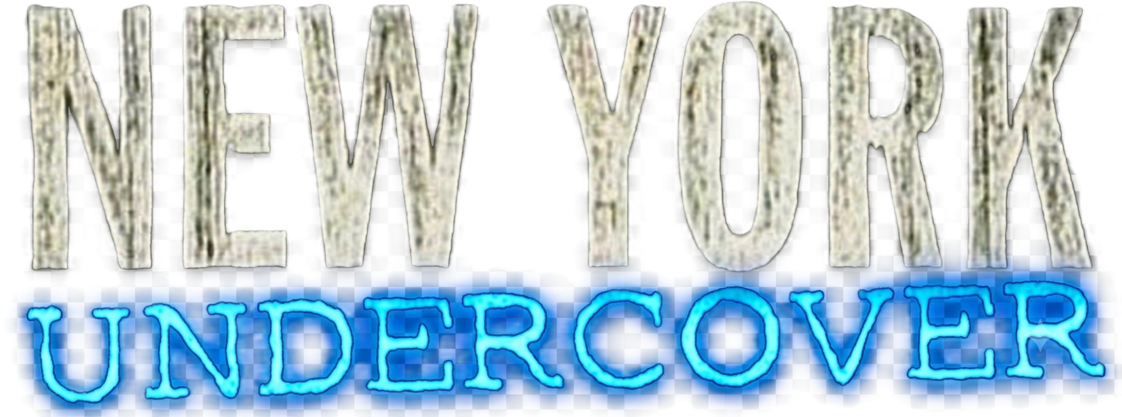
- Also known as: Uptown Undercover
- Genre: Crime drama
- Created by: Dick Wolf; Kevin Arkadie
- Starring: Malik Yoba; Michael DeLorenzo; Patti D'Arbanville-Quinn; Lauren Vélez; Jonathan LaPaglia; Marisa Ryan; Josh Hopkins; Tommy Ford
- Theme music composer: Seasons 1–3: James Mtume; Dunn Pearson; Gregory Royal; Season 4: James Mtume; Dunn Pearson
- Opening theme: "New York Undercover" (seasons 1–4)
- Ending theme: "New York Undercover (Rock Instrumental theme)" (season 4)
- Composer: James Mtume
- Country of origin: United States
- Original language: English
- No. of seasons: 4
- No. of episodes: 89 (list of episodes)

Production
- Executive producers: Andre Harrell; Brad Kern; Dick Wolf
- Producers: Kevin Arkadie; Arthur W. Forney; Peter R. McIntosh; Larry Moskowitz
- Cinematography: Glenn Kershaw; Edward J. Pei; Scott Williams
- Running time: 45–48 minutes
- Production companies: Universal Television; Wolf Entertainment

Original release
- Network: Fox
- Release: September 8, 1994 – June 25, 1998

Related
- Law & Order (franchise); Homicide: Life on the Street

New York Undercover is an American police drama that aired on the Fox television network from September 8, 1994, to June 25, 1998. The series starred Malik Yoba as Detective J.C. Williams and Michael DeLorenzo as Detective Eddie Torres, two undercover detectives in New York City's Fourth Precinct who were assigned to investigate various crimes and gang-related cases. The cast also included Patti D'Arbanville-Quinn as their superior, Lt. Virginia Cooper, and Lauren Vélez, who joined the cast in the second season as Nina Moreno, fellow detective and love interest to Torres. New York Undercover was co-created and produced by Dick Wolf, and its storyline takes place in the same fictional universe as Wolf's NBC series Law & Order, its spin-offs, the Chicago and FBI series, and Homicide: Life on the Street.

New York Undercover (whose working title during development was Uptown Undercover, named after the record label, Uptown Records, whose founder and CEO, Andre Harrell, was also the executive producer of the series) is notable for being the first police drama on American television to feature two people of color in the starring roles. In contrast to the popularity of NBC's "Must See TV" on Thursday nights in the 1990s, many African-American viewers flocked to Fox's Thursday-night line-up of Martin, Living Single, and New York Undercover.

== Synopsis ==
In addition to the main storylines in each episode, subplots explored the private lives of the show's characters. For example, Det. Williams struggled to raise his young son, Gregory (George O. Gore II), while Torres was shown to be fighting family and other related problems, including having to cope with his father (Mike Torres, played by Jose Perez), whose drug addiction and HIV-positive status causes recurring issues, and a childhood-friend turned organized-crime boss.

At the beginning of the third season, a new detective, Tommy McNamara (Jonathan LaPaglia), was introduced as a principal character. In the third-season finale in May 1997, Torres and Moreno are married. However, in that same episode, Torres and McNamara are both killed by a gang of bank robbers.

The series returned with a new cast for its fourth and final season in January 1998. Williams and Moreno were assigned to a new unit, resulting in Cooper being dropped from the cast. Joining the detectives were Lt. Malcolm Barker (played by Tommy Ford), Det. Nell Delaney (Marisa Ryan), and Det. Alec Stone (Josh Hopkins). The new unit eventually captured the last bank robber responsible for the deaths of Torres and McNamara.

== Cast ==
Actor	Character	Seasons			
Actor	Character	1	2	3	4
Malik Yoba	Detective J.C. Williams	Main	Main	Main	Main
Michael DeLorenzo	Detective Eddie Torres	Main	Main	Main	
Patti D'Arbanville-Quinn	Lieutenant Virginia Cooper	Main	Main	Main	
Lauren Vélez	Detective Nina Moreno-Torres		Main	Main	Main
Jonathan LaPaglia	Detective Tommy McNamara			Main	
Marisa Ryan	Detective Nell Delaney				Main
Josh Hopkins	Detective Alec Stone				Main
Tommy Ford	Lieutenant Malcolm Barker				Main

=== Main ===
The principal cast members from season 2 of New York Undercover (clockwise, from top left): Patti D'Arbanville-Quinn as Virginia Cooper, Lauren Vélez as Nina Moreno, Michael DeLorenzo as Eddie Torres, and Malik Yoba as J.C. Williams.

- Malik Yoba as Det. Julius Clarence "J.C." Williams: J.C. is an African-American detective at the Fourth Precinct. He is a salty but dedicated, street-smart detective whose optimism toward his job wanes over time. He has a son, Gregory, whom he fathered as a teenager with then-girlfriend Chantal Tierney. His partner Eddie Torres is his closest friend. J.C. is the only character to appear in all 89 episodes.
- Michael DeLorenzo as Det. Eduardo "Eddie" Torres (seasons 1–3): Born in the Bronx, Eddie is a Puerto Rican–American detective. He is the more hot-headed of the pair, with partner J.C. being the more level-headed one. Torres is a smart, talented undercover officer. After years of estrangement from much of his immediate family, he formed close relationships with his brother Jimmy, a priest; his sister Carmen, a journalist; and his father Mike, a musician and recovering heroin addict. His partner J.C. Williams is his closest friend. At the end of the third season, Eddie is killed in the line of duty after his car is bombed in a revenge attack by bank robber Nadine Jordan.
- Patti D'Arbanville-Quinn as Lt. Virginia Cooper (seasons 1–3): Virginia is the show's "tough but fair" commanding officer during the first three seasons. She is married and has four children, one of whom died at the age of eight. She is the commanding officer of the detective squad at the NYPD's Fourth Precinct. She frequently tells the detectives to solve their cases and do it by the book. After the third season, she's never seen or heard from again as a result of her being dropped from the cast.
- Lauren Vélez as Det. Nina Moreno-Torres (seasons 2–4): Nina is a NY Puerto Rican. At the age of 16, she married her boyfriend Luis and gave birth to a daughter, Melissa. She places the girl for adoption after Luis abandoned her. She later dated and married Eddie Torres, but was widowed soon after following his murder. Her mother is a sergeant with the NYPD.
- Jonathan LaPaglia as Det. Tommy McNamara (season 3): Tommy is an Irish-Italian American detective. His father was a police officer who was killed in the line of duty, with many suspecting that he was corrupt. Prior to his transfer to the Fourth Precinct, he had very little interaction with New York's African-American and Latino neighborhoods or police officers. At the end of the third season, Tommy is killed after being shot to death by Nadine Jordan, whose gang he'd infiltrated while undercover.
- Marisa Ryan as Det. Nell Delaney (season 4): Nell is a young officer introduced in the fourth season. She lied about her age upon entering the police academy, but the NYPD chose to overlook this when she was exposed years later. She is a close friend of fellow detective Alec Stone.
- Josh Hopkins as Det. Alec Stone (season 4): The S.I.D squads tech expert. Born Alec D'Amico, he is the son of the head of a Brooklyn-based organized crime family. Alec's decision to pursue a career in law enforcement has estranged him from most of his relatives. It was mentioned once in the series that Stone served six years as a Navy SEAL prior to joining NYPD. He is a close friend of fellow detective Nell Delaney.
- Tommy Ford as Lt. Malcolm Barker (season 4): Malcolm is the commanding officer of the NYPD's Special Investigations Division. Barker is a tough, demanding, and unconventional team leader. Most of the S.I.D.'s operations are covert and the detectives names and records are wiped from the database system when they go under. When they first arrive to his division, J.C. & Nina bump heads with him a lot due to his style of command as they are used to Lt. Cooper's "by the book" approach as he has a different mentality, frequently instructing his detectives to "lie, cheat, [and do] whatever it takes" to close a case. Unlike Cooper who only did an undercover assignment if necessary, Barker would go undercover with his subordinates more frequently.

=== Recurring ===
==== Family ====
- George Gore II as Gregory "G" Williams: Gregory is the son of J.C. Williams and Chantel Tierney. In the pilot episode, he is described as a nine-year-old. For most of Season 1, his given age is 10. By the beginning of Season 3, his given age is 13 and by season 4, his given age is 14. He is the only recurring character to appear in all four seasons.
- Michael Michele as Sandra Gill (season 1): Sandy is an attorney in her late twenties. Throughout Season 1, she was involved with J.C. Williams. She became pregnant with J.C.'s baby and agreed to marry him, but was murdered on the eve of their wedding by Danny Cort, a criminal with a vendetta against J.C.
- Fatima Faloye as Chantel Tierney (seasons 1–3): Chantel is a registered nurse in her late twenties. She has a son, Gregory, to whom she gave birth as a teenager with then-boyfriend J.C. Williams.
- Kamar de los Reyes as Luis (season 2): Luis was the teenage boyfriend of Nina Moreno, whom he married after she became pregnant. The child, a girl, was placed for adoption and given the name Melissa Lewis. Luis soon abandoned Nina. While she moved on with her life, Nina never divorced Luis. Years later, after he and Nina finally agreed to begin divorce proceedings, Luis was killed during a mugging.
- Roger Robinson as Major Harold Williams (season 3): An officer with the United States Army Special Forces, he is the father of J.C. Williams. He abandoned his wife and son, and did not contact J.C. again for 17 years.
- José Perez as Mike Torres (seasons 1–3): Mike is a jazz and salsa musician, and a recovering heroin addict. Having alienated much of his family over the years, he is closest to his son Eddie.
- José Zúñiga as Father Jimmy Torres (seasons 1–2): Jimmy is a Catholic priest, and the older brother of Eddie Torres.
- Lisa Vidal as Carmen Torres (seasons 1–2): Carmen is a newspaper reporter, and the sister of Eddie Torres.
- Nancy Ticotin as Teresa Torres Rivera (seasons 1 and 3): Teresa is the well-to-do sister of Eddie Torres.
- Steve Ryan as Dave Cooper (seasons 2–3): Dave is the husband of Virginia Cooper.
- Eden Riegel as Megan Cooper (seasons 2–3): Megan is the daughter of Virginia Cooper. As a preteen, Megan befriends a man in an online chat room. When she meets him in person, he kidnaps and rapes her. During his subsequent attempt to avoid arrest, the man is shot and killed by Virginia.
- Marina Durell as Sgt. Sonia Moreno (seasons 2–3): A sergeant with the NYPD, she is the mother of Nina Moreno.
- Zoe Dora Lukov as Melissa Lewis (season 3): Melissa is the biological daughter of Nina Moreno and her first husband Luis. Because her parents were still teenagers when she was born, she was placed for adoption.
- Dean Winters as Paul Delany (season 4): A firefighter with the FDNY, he is the brother of Nell Delany.
- Jennifer Esposito as Gina D'Amico (season 4): The former lover of Alec Stone, she is now married to his brother Frankie D'Amico.
- Justin Theroux as Frankie D'Amico (season 4): An organized crime boss with the Brooklyn-based D'Amico Family, he is the brother of Alec Stone.
- Sean Squire as Roger (season 4): Roger is the maternal half-brother of Malcolm Barker. He and Malcolm are estranged.
- Novella Nelson as Malcolm Barker's Mother (season 4)

==== Law enforcement personnel ====
- Frank Pellegrino as Det. Ricciarelli (seasons 1–2)
- Jim Moody as Det. Otis "Old School" Washington (season 1)
- Gilbert Lewis as Det. Otis "Old School" Washington (pilot episode only)
- Takeo Matsushita as Medical Examiner Wong (season 1 episodes 3, 4 & 5)
- Lee Wong as Medical Examiner Wong (seasons 1–3)
- James Saito as Det. Chang (season 1)
- Jon M. McDonnell as Detective Sweitek (seasons 1–2)
- Michelle Hurd as A.D.A. Maria Reynolds (seasons 1–2)
- Edie Falco as Sgt. Kelly (seasons 2–3)
- James McCaffrey as Capt. Arthur O'Byrne (season 3)
- Joe Lisi as Chief of Detectives (season 4)

==== Criminals ====
- John Costelloe as John Santucci (seasons 1–3): Santucci is an organized crime boss connected to the Gambino Family. He was a childhood acquaintance of Eddie Torres, and there is personal animus between the two.
- Ice-T as Danny "Danny-Up" Cort (seasons 1–2): A chemistry wiz, Cort was a rising drug kingpin until being apprehended by detectives from the Fourth Precinct. After J.C. Williams killed his brother in a police shootout, Cort retaliated by murdering J.C.'s pregnant fiancée Sandy Gill, igniting a bitter feud between the two men, which only ended after J.C. killed him in self-defense.
- Giancarlo Esposito as Adolfo Guzman (season 2): Guzman was a childhood rival of Eddie Torres, and as an adult became a criminal associate of John Santucci. The animus between Eddie and Guzman grew when Guzman attempted to take over Mike Torres' nightclub.
- Naomi Campbell as Simone Jeffers (season 2): Sometime after Sandy Gill's death, Jeffers seduced J.C. Williams as part of a revenge plot instigated by Danny Cort.
- Ernest Abuba as Sonny Fung (season 3): Fung was an organized crime lord in the Chinatown section in Manhattan. He ordered the death of Tommy McNamara's father, a corrupt police officer secretly working with Fung. Years later, Fung is killed in a shootout by another corrupt police officer, Harry Bennett (the elder McNamara's former partner).
- Dana Eskelson as Nadine Jordan (seasons 3–4): Jordan was part of a highly skilled bank robbery team, and was responsible for the murder of Detective Tommy McNamara after discovering he was a cop that had infiltrated her crew. Eventually, every member of her crew was captured or killed by the police, with her husband being amongst the fatalities, but she escaped. In retaliation for her husband's death, she killed Eddie Torres, becoming the primary enemy of J.C. Williams (Eddie's best friend) and Nina Moreno (Eddie's bride and Tommy's partner) during the fourth and final season. Nadine is eventually captured and convicted of her numerous crimes (including Eddie and Tommy's murders), but is spared the death penalty and given life without parole, much to J.C. and Nina's dismay. Nina eventually kills her in self-defense during an undercover operation in a prison.

==== Others ====
- Victor Colicchio as "Slick Rick" (season 1): One of Eddie Torres' confidential informants.
- Elizabeth Rodriguez as Gina (season 1): Eddie Torres' off-and-on girlfriend during Season 1.
- Gladys Knight as Natalie (season 1): The original owner of Natalie's, the nightclub which appears in virtually every episode of the series' first three seasons.
- Rosanna Scotto as Herself (seasons 1–3): She is a television reporter for WNYW, the Fox station in New York.
- Isaiah Washington as Andre Morgan (season 2): An ex-convict released on parole, Andre is a single father whose son is a friend and hockey teammate of J.C. Williams' son Gregory.
- N'Bushe Wright as Carol (season 2): Carol is Andre Morgan's parole officer. She dates J.C. Williams briefly.
- Tyra Banks as Natasha Claybourne (season 3): Natasha is Gregory Williams' French teacher. She briefly dates J.C.

=== Multiple-role players ===
Numerous actors made appearances in two or more episodes portraying different characters. Before joining the cast in Season 2 as Nina Moreno, Lauren Vélez appeared in the first-season episode "Olde Tyme Religion" as a believer in Santería. Additionally, J. K. Simmons guest starred as Sgt. Treadway in the Season 2 episode "Unis," returning in Season 4's "Mob Street" as Law & Order police psychiatrist Emil Skoda. Michelle Hurd played a recurring role in Seasons 1 and 2 as A.D.A. Reynolds, but returned as a criminal in Season 3's "No Place Like Hell". Joe Lisi appeared in the second-season episode "Bad Blood" before assuming a recurring role as the Chief of Detectives in Season 4. Both Jesse L. Martin and Ice-T portrayed criminals on this series before ultimately landing their iconic roles as detectives on Law & Order and Law & Order: Special Victims Unit, respectively.

The following actors also appeared in multiple roles:

- Kirk Acevedo
- Lawrence B. Adisa
- Ray Aranha
- Yancey Arias
- Rafael Báez
- Jennifer Burry
- Paul Butler
- Paul Calderón
- Gabriel Casseus
- Jude Ciccolella
- Chad L. Coleman
- Isaac Fowler III
- Sonny Jim Gaines
- Paul Guilfoyle
- Luis Guzmán

- Steve Harris
- Robert Jason Jackson
- Hassan Johnson
- Joseph Guillermo Jones II
- Kirk "Sticky Fingaz" Jones
- Jean-Claude La Marre
- Scott Lawrence
- Fernando López
- Shiek Mahmud-Bey
- Jesse L. Martin
- Anthony Mason
- Shawn McLean
- Novella Nelson
- Sean Nelson
- Manny Pérez
- Jaime Perry

- Mekhi Phifer
- Jon Polito
- Sharrieff Pugh
- Ruben Santiago-Hudson
- Derrick Simmons
- Henry Simmons
- Phyllis Yvonne Stickney
- Ray Anthony Thomas
- Tony Sepulveda
- Tamara Tunie
- John Ventimiglia
- Frank Vincent
- Daniel von Bargen
- Chris Walker
- Charles Weldon
- Kristen Wilson

== Episodes ==
Season	Episodes	Originally released	
Season	Episodes	First released	Last released
1	26	September 8, 1994	May 11, 1995
2	26	August 31, 1995	May 9, 1996
3	24	August 29, 1996	May 15, 1997
4	13	January 8, 1998	June 25, 1998

== Controversy ==
On July 23, 1996, the day shooting was supposed to begin on the third season, lead actors Malik Yoba and Michael DeLorenzo didn't show up, having joined together and presenting a list of demands to creator/producer Dick Wolf. Both actors wanted their pay increased, DeLorenzo stated that the duo were making $40,000 each per episode and they wanted $100,000 each per episode. They also wanted more creative input with DeLorenzo in particular wanting to direct a few episodes. They wanted a gym, trailers for the stars and better food to be provided on set.

After receiving their demands, Dick Wolf declined, and said that New York Undercover was not Friends. Wolf was irate, calling the demands of actors joining together to hold a show in limbo "a virus" to the entertainment industry and he threatened to write both Yoba and DeLorenzo out of the show altogether.

A day after the holdout, Universal Television, which was the production company of the show, filed a $1.2 million lawsuit against DeLorenzo and Yoba, claiming that the two had breached their contract and claimed that they were costing the show $60,000 each day they didn't show up to work.

After three days, the holdout ended and the two actors returned back to set, with their demands unmet, and continued under the terms of their original contract. However, tensions lingered between DeLorenzo and executive producer Wolf, and towards the end of season three, DeLorenzo's character, Detective Eddie Torres, was killed in a car explosion. Yoba was retained on the show for its fourth and final season.

== Soundtracks ==
A soundtrack containing hip hop and R&B music was released on September 19, 1995 by Uptown Records and MCA Records. It features songs from the series, such as a cover of "(You Make Me Feel Like) A Natural Woman" performed by Mary J. Blige, "I Miss You (Come Back Home)" by Monifah, "Jeeps, Lex Coups, Bimaz & Benz" by Lost Boyz, and the theme to New York Undercover, composed by James Mtume. The soundtrack album is executive produced by Andre Harrell, the executive producer of the series, and it was nominated for an NAACP Image Award for Outstanding Album.

A second soundtrack album for the series containing contemporary R&B music, New York Undercover: A Night At Natalie's, was released on January 13, 1998 by MCA Records. The album features R&B songs performed by some of the various musical acts at Natalie's, the nightclub which appears in virtually every episode of the series' first three seasons, such as 112, Mary J. Blige, Xscape, Chaka Khan, Teena Marie, K-Ci & JoJo, Brownstone, Gerald Levert, B. B. King, Tito Nieves, and The Barrio Boyzz. The album also contains a song performed by Michael DeLorenzo, who plays Detective Eddie Torres, titled "Don't Let Me Be Lonely Tonight".

== Potential reboot/revival ==
On December 5, 2018, Deadline reported that series creator Dick Wolf and ABC were in talks to reboot the series. Six days later, ABC officially committed the reboot to a pilot.

On January 31, 2019, ABC officially ordered the reboot to pilot, also revealing that it would officially be a revival of the original series, featuring both old characters and a new cast. In February 2019, both Malik Yoba and Lauren Veléz were confirmed to reprise their respective roles as J.C. Williams and Nina Moreno, with Williams now being the overseeing officer of the new young detectives, and Moreno being retired, but retaining ties to her old unit. On March 12, 2019, ABC cast Toby Sandeman and Otmara Marrero as the revival's two lead detectives Nat Gilmore and Melissa Ortiz, as well as Anna Enger and Octavio Pisano as supporting detectives Lisa Kim and Moses Hernandez, and MC Lyte as Lieutenant April Freeman, the unit's new boss.

On May 10, 2019, it was announced that the revival would not move forward on ABC, but would be shopped to other networks and streaming services. As of January 2020, it is still being shopped around. In July 2020, Deadline reported that the revival might come to fruition on NBCUniversal's new streaming service, Peacock.

== Rerun ==
The show and all the seasons are currently available for streaming in HD on Tubi, Disney+ and Hulu. The show re-aired on VH1 and BET.
