= Love Always (film) =

1996 American film

- Directed by: Jude Pauline Eberhard
- Written by: Sharlene Baker; Jude Pauline Eberhard; Eleanor England
- Based on: Finding Signs by Sharlene Baker
- Produced by: Isaac Artenstein
- Starring: Marisa Ryan
- Cinematography: Xavier Pérez Grobet; Stephen Lighthill
- Edited by: Joel Goodman
- Music by: Anton Sanko; Jaime Valle
- Production companies: Cinewest; Persistence of Vision Films
- Distributed by: Legacy Releasing
- Release date: November 9, 1996 (Ft. Lauderdale Film Festival)
- Running time: 90 minutes
- Country: United States
- Language: English

Love Always is a 1996 American romantic comedy film directed by Jude Pauline Eberhard and starring Marisa Ryan. It is Eberhard's directorial debut, based on Sharlene Baker's novel Finding Signs.

== Cast ==
- Marisa Ryan as Julia Bradshaw
- Moon Zappa as Mary Ellen
- James C. Victor as Sean
- Michael Reilly Burke as Mark Righetti
- Doug Hutchison as James
- Beth Grant as Simon
- Tracy Fraim as David Ritterman
- Beverly D'Angelo as Miranda

== Reception ==
Roger Ebert awarded the film a half star.
