= La Camioneta =

2012 American Film

- Theatrical release poster
- Directed by: Mark Kendall
- Produced by: Rafael González; Mark Kendall; Executive: Esther B Robinson
- Cinematography: Mark Kendall
- Edited by: Mark Kendall; Shannon Kennedy
- Music by: T. Griffin
- Production companies: Ek Balam Producciones; Follow Your Nose Films
- Distributed by: Emerging Pictures
- Release dates: March 10, 2012 (SXSW Film Festival); May 31, 2013 (United States)
- Running time: 72 minutes
- Countries: Guatemala; United States
- Languages: English; Spanish

La Camioneta is a 2012 documentary film directed by Mark Kendall. It is an experimental work that follows the transformative journey of a decommissioned American school bus through complex social, political, and economic landscapes.

== Production ==
Filming began at a school bus auction in Pennsylvania. Kendall met a buyer who had come to the United States as a transmigrant in order to purchase a decommissioned Blue Bird bus. They rode down together on the acquired bus through Mexico and into Guatemala, where it was resold at a junkyard and transformed into a vehicle for public transportation. Kendall explains that "it was equally as vital for me to be on the bus myself as it was to not know where it might end up, who might be its new owner, or what route, if any, it might end up joining."

== Release ==
La Camioneta premiered at the 2012 SXSW Film Festival, had its Guatemalan premiere at the 2012 Festival Ícaro, and premiered internationally at the 2013 Festival Internacional de Cine en Guadalajara, where it was nominated for Best Documentary and Best Director. The film was released theatrically in the United States, Mexico, and Guatemala.

== Reception ==
La Camioneta was well-received critically, with a 100% approval rating on review aggregator Rotten Tomatoes and a score of 83 out of 100 on Metacritic, based on 9 critics, indicating "universal acclaim".

Film critics have praised the film as "a brilliant microhistory of our globalized world" often highlighting the surprising payoffs of its conceptual minimalism.

Writing for Variety, Andrew Barker stated that "The film wrings an almost bizarre amount of political, humanistic and spiritual substance out of this limited frame. Kendall's eye for untold stories, as well as his instinct for catching evocatively framed images on the fly, mark him as a name to watch". The film was selected as a New York Times Critics' Pick by Stephen Holden, who described the film as "an upbeat story of resilience, regeneration and artistic imagination." In J. Hoberman's review for BLOUIN ARTINFO, he wrote that "La Camioneta is a poetic, even dreamy, film that ultimately conveys the mystical sense of a transmigrated (mechanical) soul."

La Camioneta was named as one of IndieWire's “Top Docs of 2013” and one of Fandor's “Best Political Films of 2013.”

At the IDA Documentary Awards, the film received the David L. Wolper Award.
