= John Quigley (producer) =

American film producer and director

- John "Quig" Quigley
- Born: Detroit, Michigan
- Occupation(s): Film director, producer, editor, writer
- Years active: 1991–present
- Notable work: Eminem "Mockingbird" video, Eminem "Mosh" video, Eminem "Sing for the Moment" video, Eminem "Superman" video
- Website: http://www.chromebumperfilms.net

John "Quig" Quigley is an American film director, producer, editor, and writer. His professional career began in music video production and directing in Detroit, Michigan, in the early 1990s. Since then, Quigley has produced and directed music videos and audio-visual projects for artists including – Eminem, 50 Cent, Kid Rock, Christina Aguilera and Tori Amos. As founder and owner of the production company, Chrome Bumper Films, Quigley has also created and directed award-winning documentaries and commercials.

== Career ==
=== Eminem ===
- Mockingbird - Interscope Records

=== Documentary films ===
- Farewell from Moscow
- Eminem - All Access Europe

=== DVDs ===
Farewell from Moscow
