= Mark Kendall (filmmaker) =

American multidisciplinary artist

- Born: 13 October 1982; Minneapolis, Minnesota
- Education: School of Visual Arts, Vanderbilt University
- Awards: Guggenheim Fellowship; Pew Fellowship in the Arts
- Website: markkendall.net

Mark Kendall (born 1982) is an American filmmaker. He was a 2014 Guggenheim Fellow, a 2015 MacDowell Colony Fellow, and the recipient of a 2016 Pew Fellowship in the Arts.

== Early life and education ==
Kendall was born in Minneapolis and raised in the Philadelphia area. He received both his B.A. (2005) and M.A. (2008) from Vanderbilt University, and a Master of Fine Arts from New York's School of Visual Arts (2011). He is an alumnus of Berlinale Talents.

== Work ==
Kendall's 2007 short film, For the People, By the People, considers the work of the CEFREC/CAIB Bolivian filmmaking collective and the role of audiovisual media production in structuring cultural understandings of history.

Kendall's 2010 film, The Time Machine, examines the world of a migrant watchmaker whose studio is situated in one of the peripheral passageways of Grand Central Terminal.

Kendall's 2012 debut feature, La Camioneta, is an experimental documentary that tracks the 3,000-mile journey of a decommissioned American school bus through complex social, political, and economic landscapes as it is transformed into a vehicle for public transportation in Guatemala. During its theatrical release, the film was selected by Stephen Holden as a New York Times Critics’ Pick and named as one of IndieWire’s "Top Docs of 2013", earning an award from the International Documentary Association and marking Kendall as "a name to watch" in Variety.

In 2013, Kendall began a long-term project in the Arctic Circle, with early support from a Guggenheim Fellowship.
