= Neighbor (2009 film) =

- DVD released by Lions Gate Entertainment
- Directed by: Robert A. Masciantonio
- Written by: Robert A. Masciantonio
- Produced by: Charles Smith
- Starring: America Olivo
- Cinematography: Jeff Schirmer
- Edited by: R. Emmett Sibley
- Music by: Kurt Oldman
- Production company: Neighbor Productions
- Distributed by: Aspect Film
- Release date: July 28, 2009 (Fantasia International Film Festival)
- Running time: 90 minutes
- Country: United States
- Language: English

Neighbor is a 2009 American horror comedy film written and directed by Robert A. Masciantonio.

== Plot ==
The film opens on the exterior of a house in the suburbs. Inside, a woman known only as "The Girl" is dancing around after preparing her breakfast. "The Girl" enters a bedroom and finds a man and a dead woman tied to chairs. The Girl acts shocked, but then it is revealed that she was the one who had captured and tortured this couple, killing a female relative and possibly their baby as well. The Girl finishes the husband off by stabbing him in the chest with a tap, collecting the blood that drips from it in a wine glass. The Girl then claims two more victims, an elderly woman whose medication she tampers with, and a high school student who she drowns in a bathtub after several unsuccessful attempts to electrocute her. The Girl moves forward to stalking Don Carpenter, a stoner and member of a band who lives alone, so The Girl easily captures him, and imprisons him in his recording studio basement.

The Girl tortures and mutilates Don, and gives him drugs that cause him to experience hallucinations and flashbacks. Don's friends, band mates, and ex-girlfriend are also captured and tortured to death by The Girl. Eventually growing bored with Don, The Girl strangles him (inexplicably beginning to cry while doing so) as he weakly tries to do the same to her. Don's body and those of his friends are posed around the basement by The Girl, who then goes upstairs, where a party that Don had been planning is in full swing. The Girl greets the guests, leaves the house, and dances down the street.

As the credits roll, Mike, one of Don's band mates who had seemingly died when The Girl tricked him into drinking drain cleaner, awakens, coughs up the chemicals, and screams for help when he realizes that he is now blind.

== Cast ==
- America Olivo as The Girl
- Christian Campbell as Don Carpenter
- Joseph Aniska as Sam Landis
- Pete Postiglione as Mike Hodder
- Lauren Rooney as Elizabeth Hitchcock
- Mink Stole as Mrs. Spool
- Sarah McCarron as Nancy Baker
- Amy Rutledge as Jenn Crawford
- Meredith Orlow as Sophia Kane
- Giovanna Galdi as Laurie Leigh
- Robert A. Masciantonio as Kip Wellington
- Stink Fisher as Daniel Cunningham
- Megan Madsen as Betsy Cunningham
- Alexandra Golaszewska as Linda Cunningham
- Angeline Zeigler as Janet Price

== Literature ==
Two prequel short stories were written by Robert A. Masciantonio. The first, New Girl in Town, was included in Anthology Philly, while the second, Neighbor for Christmas, was released through Amazon.com. In January, 2013 it was announced on Icons of Frights that Masciantonio will continue the series of e-stories for each major American holiday, including New Year, Valentine's Day, St. Patrick's Day, and Easter. The six stories, including a revised version of New Girl in Town, were later compiled in a collection entitled A Girl For All Seasons, Volume 1.

== Reception ==
Neighbor was called "deliciously dark and humorous" by Dread Central's Steve Barton, who awarded it a 4/5, while Audrey Quaranta of Fangoria gave the film a 3½ out of 4, and categorized it as "definitely one for the gore-lover's library". In a review for Horror News, Todd Martin wrote, "Do yourself a huge favor. Run out and get a copy of Neighbor as soon as it is available to own. Trust me, you won’t regret it. If I had to describe it in just a few words I would say it was brutal, disturbing, and at times, a little hard to watch (and this is coming from a hardcore gore fiend). I was very impressed by this film and I think that a lot of other viewers will be as well."

DVD Talk's Justin Felix found that the film began well, but eventually became "a chore to watch" that "devolves into an ugly and unconvincing exercise in 'torture porn' that abandons the film's earlier strengths and fails to engage the viewer". Gordon Sullivan of DVD Verdict wrote, "I really wanted to like Neighbor for America Olivo's performance (which is dark and funny in equal measure) and the overwhelming amount of attention lavished on the gore. However, the lack of any real plot or character development makes Neighbor hard to love."
