= Gillian d'Hondt =

Gillian D'Hondt
Mercer Island Islanders
- Title: Head coach
- League: KingCo 3A

Personal information
- Born: 16 April 1982 (age 44) Seattle, Washington, U.S.
- Listed height: 6 ft 3 in (1.91 m)

Career information
- High school: Blanchet (Seattle, Washington)
- College: Pacific
- Playing career: 2004–2012
- Position: Center
- Number: 40

Career history

Playing
- 2004–2005: Waregem
- 2005–2006: Rhondda Rebels
- 2006–2007: Castellani Pontedera
- 2007–2008: Trony Cagliari
- 2008–2009: ADBA Avilés
- 2009–2010: Saarlouis Royals
- 2010–2011: Vienna Flying Foxes
- 2010–2011: Guadalajara
- 2011–2012: Ancona

Coaching
- 2014: Northwest University (assistant)
- 2015–present: Mercer Island High School

Career highlights
- As player: 3x All Big West Conference Second Team (2002, 2003, 2004_; Big West Conference All Tournament Team (2004); England Basketball National Team (2006)

Gillian Katherine d'Hondt (born 16 April 1982) is an American and European women's basketball player originally from Seattle, Washington. Her father is athlete Walter D'Hondt and her aunt is actress Danica d'Hondt.

== Early life and college ==
D'Hondt attended Bishop Blanchet High School in Seattle, Washington, and accepted a basketball scholarship to the University of the Pacific in Stockton, California. While at the University of the Pacific, she earned all Big West Conference second team honors from 2002 to 2004. In 2004, she received recognition on the first team all-Big West Conference women's basketball tournament team. Throughout her four-year career at the University of the Pacific, she averaged 14.3 points per game and 6.7 rebounds per game.

=== Pacific statistics ===
Legend
GP	Games played	GS	Games started	MPG	Minutes per game
FG%	Field goal percentage	3P%	3-point field goal percentage	FT%	Free throw percentage
RPG	Rebounds per game	APG	Assists per game	SPG	Steals per game
BPG	Blocks per game	PPG	Points per game	**Bold**	Career high

Year	Team	GP	Points	FG%	3P%	FT%	RPG	APG	SPG	BPG	PPG
2000-01	Pacific	28	203	44.2%	0.0%	48.3%	5.5	1.3	0.9	0.7	7.3
2001-02	Pacific	**30**	408	**54.5%**	0.0%	**55.5%**	**7.1**	**2.1**	**1.3**	**1.1**	13.6
2002-03	Pacific	28	**441**	51.0%	0.0%	55.0%	6.8	1.0	0.4	0.8	**15.8**
2003-04	Pacific	19	263	53.2%	0.0%	54.6%	5.9	1.2	0.6	0.5	13.8
Career		105	1315	51.2%	0.0%	54.0%	6.3	1.4	0.8	0.8	12.5

== Professional career ==
D'Hondt competed in the 2006 Commonwealth Games in Melbourne on the England women's national basketball team. d'Hondt played for multiple European teams, including the Rhondda Rebels and Isolux Corsan Guadalajara. She qualified for the 2006 England Women's Basketball National Team, and won a bronze medal at the 2006 Commonwealth Games in Melbourne, Australia. It was an historic event being the first time the men's and women's teams were competing as England in a major multi-sport event and it was the first Commonwealth Games in which basketball was featured. Gillian has also played for Guadalajara, Spain; Saarlouis, Germany; ADBA Avilés, Spain; Barking Abbey, United Kingdom; Waregem, Belgium; and most recently Ancona, Italy.

== Coaching career ==
In 2014, d'Hondt accepted a coaching position at Northwest University in Kirkland, Washington, as a women's basketball assistant coach. In May 2015, d'Hondt took over as the head coach for the Mercer Island High School girls basketball team. She led the Mercer Island team to a state championship in the 2016–17 season.

== Personal life ==
D'Hondt is the daughter of Canadian Olympic gold medalist for rowing, Walter D'Hondt.
