= Anthony Apesos =

American painter (born 1953)

Anthony Apesos (born 1953) is an American painter and professor emeritus of Fine Arts at the Art Institute of Boston at Lesley University.

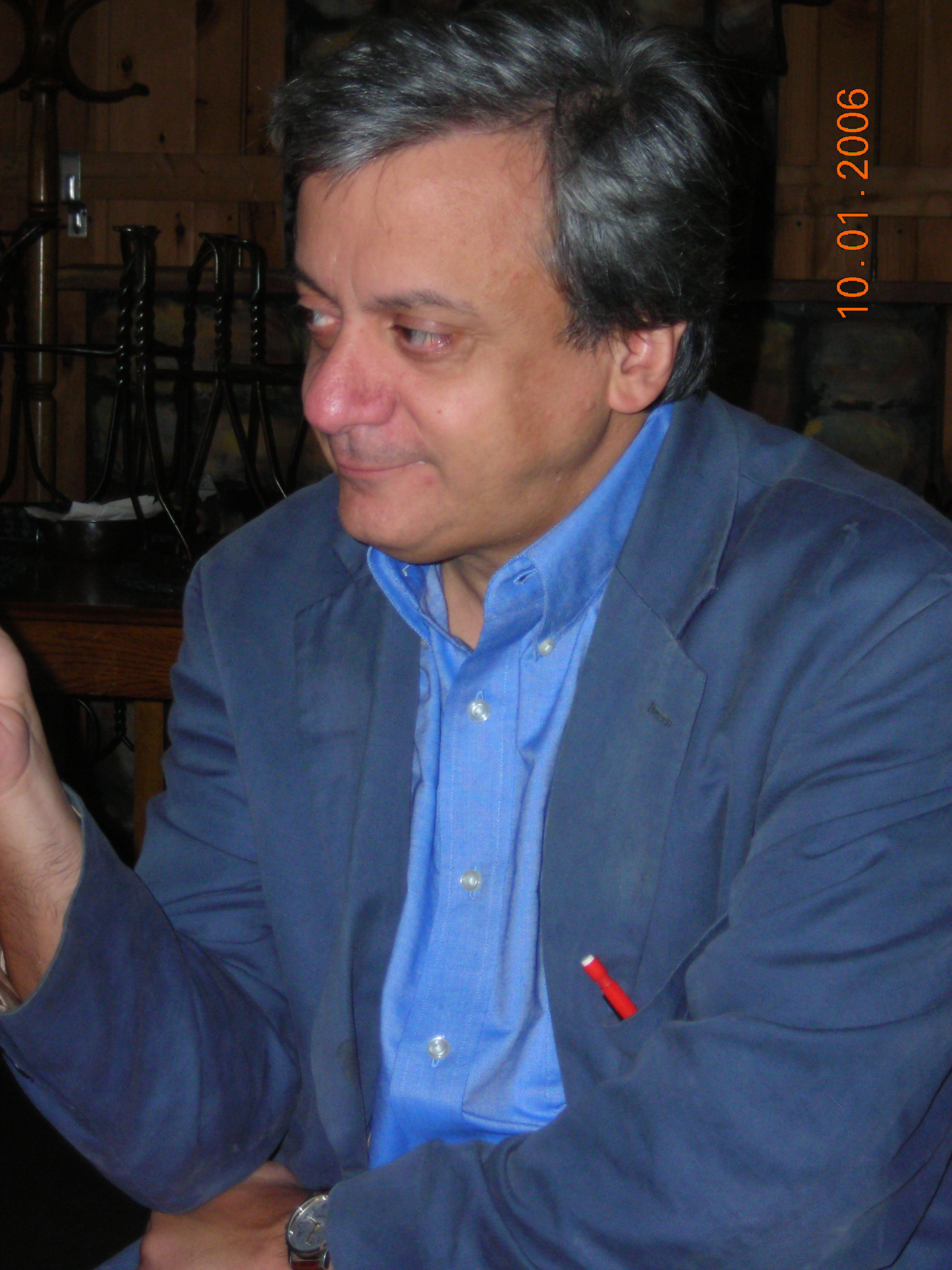
Anthony Apesos (2007)

== Biography ==
Apesos was born on 6 January 1953 in Newark, New Jersey, the son of John and Helen Apesos. Later that year, his family returned to Philadelphia, where his parents were restaurateurs. Apesos attended The Episcopal Academy from 1965 to 1972, after which he received his A.B. at Vassar College in Religion. Apesos studied painting under Morris Blackburn, Arthur de Costa, Ben Kamahira, and Sidney Goodman at the Pennsylvania Academy of the Fine Arts from 1975 to 1979, and received a M.F.A. in 1991 from the Milton Avery Graduate School of the Arts at Bard College. In 1992, Apesos moved to Boston, and became chair of the Fine Arts department at the Art Institute of Boston (now part of Lesley University). Apesos founded AIB's M.F.A. program, and currently is professor of Fine Arts.

== Work ==
Apesos's painting, while indebted to the American realist tradition, is informed by a fascination with mythology and archetypical themes; in this respect, his work exhibits striking parallels with the visual art of the Romantic poet and artist William Blake. Technically, Apesos draws upon the traditions of late Renaissance painting, in particular that of the Venetian masters; his work is characterized by the employment of opalescent scumbles (translucent layers of pigment placed over solid colors to produce effects of depth and texture for the viewer), and inventive, often unsettling modes of composition in which figures and background are juxtaposed in simultaneously traditional and unfamiliar ways.

== Representative paintings ==
Snow and Milk: here, the binary opposition of white and black, cold and hot, is juxtaposed against the traditional artistic figure of the female nude, providing a symbolic matrix within which to consider the way that Western art has objectified as well as celebrated femininity and the body in general.

== Exhibits, presentations, and publications ==
- Three Fabulists: Visions of Fact and Fantasy, New Arts Center (Newton), April 2000.
- Osiris Paintings, Newton Free Library, April 2001.
- Italian Perspectives, Copley Gallery (Boston), October–November 2002.
- Paintings from Tony Apesos, Holderness School, January–February 2006.
- "Interpreting Facture," College Art Association, Philadelphia, February 2002.
- Anatomy for Artists: A New Approach to Discovering, Learning and Remembering the Body (North Light Press, 2007).
- The Long Desired Medium: The History of Oil Painting (BookBaby, 2024).

== Reviews ==
- Joanne Silver, "Superlative 'Fabulists'." Boston Herald, 12 May 2000
- Emily Porter, "Re-membering Myth", The Harvard Crimson, 20 April 2001
- John Stephen Dwyer, "Anthony Apesos: artist, teacher, man for all seasons", Boston lowbrow, 22 February 2010
