= Robert A. Masciantonio =

American actor

- Born: Robert Angelo Masciantonio; May 31, 1974 (age 51); Philadelphia, Pennsylvania, U.S.
- Education: Episcopal Academy
- Alma mater: Temple University
- Occupations: Screenwriter, director, producer, actor
- Years active: 1999–present

Robert Angelo Masciantonio (born May 31, 1974) is an American screenwriter, director, producer and actor.

== Career ==
Masciantonio was born in Philadelphia and attended the Episcopal Academy. He later studied film at Temple University, where he won the Silver Reel Award for his short film, Jerks. From there he went on to write, direct, and produce the award-winning cult favorite Cold Hearts.

In 2009, he wrote, directed and had a role in the horror film Neighbor. The sold-out premiere was held at Fantasia in Montreal. Neighbor later made its way to, among others, Celluloid Screams in the UK, the International Horror and Sci-Fi Film Festival in Arizona where Masciantonio won the award for Best Screenplay and the Sainte Maxime International Horror Film Festival in France where the film won the Prix d’Argent.

Masciantonio has since written and directed three shorts for the 48 Hour Film Project with How 'bout This? and When You Sing, winning the audience award. He also taught screenwriting at Drexel University.
